= List of minor planets: 3001–4000 =

The following is a partial list of minor planets, running from minor-planet number 3001 through 4000, inclusive. The primary data for this and other partial lists is based on JPL's "Small-Body Orbital Elements" and data available from the Minor Planet Center. Critical list information is also provided by the MPC, unless otherwise specified from Lowell Observatory. A detailed description of the table's columns and additional sources are given on the main page including a complete list of every page in this series, and a statistical break-up on the dynamical classification of minor planets.

Also see the summary list of all named bodies in numerical and alphabetical order, and the corresponding naming citations for the number range of this particular list. New namings may only be added to this list after official publication, as the preannouncement of names is condemned by the Working Group for Small Bodies Nomenclature of the International Astronomical Union.

Near-Earth obj.	MBA (inner)	MBA (outer)	Centaur
Mars-crosser	MBA (middle)	Jupiter trojan	Trans-Neptunian obj.
Unclassified

== 3001–3100 ==
Designation			Discovery			Properties		Ref
Permanent	Provisional	Named after	Date	Site	Discoverer(s)	Category	Diam.	Ref
3001 Michelangelo	1982 BC_{1}	Michelangelo	January 24, 1982	Anderson Mesa	E. Bowell	PHO	7.6 km (4.7 mi)	MPC · JPL
3002 Delasalle	1982 FB_{3}	Delasalle	March 20, 1982	La Silla	H. Debehogne	·	6.3 km (3.9 mi)	MPC · JPL
3003 Konček	1983 YH	Konček	December 28, 1983	Kleť	A. Mrkos	EOS	19 km (12 mi)	MPC · JPL
3004 Knud	1976 DD	Knud	February 27, 1976	La Silla	R. M. West	·	3.5 km (2.2 mi)	MPC · JPL
3005 Pervictoralex	1979 QK_{2}	Pervictoralex	August 22, 1979	La Silla	C.-I. Lagerkvist	NYS	4.8 km (3.0 mi)	MPC · JPL
3006 Livadia	1979 SF_{11}	Livadia	September 24, 1979	Nauchnij	N. S. Chernykh	NYS ·	8.3 km (5.2 mi)	MPC · JPL
3007 Reaves	1979 UC	Reaves	October 17, 1979	Anderson Mesa	E. Bowell	·	11 km (6.8 mi)	MPC · JPL
3008 Nojiri	1938 WA	Nojiri	November 17, 1938	Heidelberg	K. Reinmuth	THM	20 km (12 mi)	MPC · JPL
3009 Coventry	1973 SM_{2}	Coventry	September 22, 1973	Nauchnij	N. S. Chernykh	·	3.8 km (2.4 mi)	MPC · JPL
3010 Ushakov	1978 SB_{5}	Ushakov	September 27, 1978	Nauchnij	L. I. Chernykh	THM	14 km (8.7 mi)	MPC · JPL
3011 Chongqing	1978 WM_{14}	Chongqing	November 26, 1978	Nanking	Purple Mountain	·	12 km (7.5 mi)	MPC · JPL
3012 Minsk	1979 QU_{9}	Minsk	August 27, 1979	Nauchnij	N. S. Chernykh	·	21 km (13 mi)	MPC · JPL
3013 Dobrovoleva	1979 SD_{7}	Dobrovoleva	September 23, 1979	Nauchnij	N. S. Chernykh	·	11 km (6.8 mi)	MPC · JPL
3014 Huangsushu	1979 TM	Huangsushu	October 11, 1979	Nanking	Purple Mountain	·	6.9 km (4.3 mi)	MPC · JPL
3015 Candy	1980 VN	Candy	November 9, 1980	Anderson Mesa	E. Bowell	CYB	25 km (16 mi)	MPC · JPL
3016 Meuse	1981 EK	Meuse	March 1, 1981	La Silla	H. Debehogne, G. de Sanctis	KOR	9.9 km (6.2 mi)	MPC · JPL
3017 Petrovič	1981 UL	Petrovič	October 25, 1981	Kleť	A. Mrkos	EUN	13 km (8.1 mi)	MPC · JPL
3018 Godiva	1982 KM	Godiva	May 21, 1982	Anderson Mesa	E. Bowell	·	8.2 km (5.1 mi)	MPC · JPL
3019 Kulin	1940 AC	Kulin	January 7, 1940	Konkoly	G. Kulin	KOR	12 km (7.5 mi)	MPC · JPL
3020 Naudts	1949 PR	Naudts	August 2, 1949	Heidelberg	K. Reinmuth	slow	12 km (7.5 mi)	MPC · JPL
3021 Lucubratio	1967 CB	Lucubratio	February 6, 1967	Zimmerwald	P. Wild	·	24 km (15 mi)	MPC · JPL
3022 Dobermann	1980 SH	Dobermann	September 16, 1980	Kleť	Z. Vávrová	H	3.2 km (2.0 mi)	MPC · JPL
3023 Heard	1981 JS	Heard	May 5, 1981	Anderson Mesa	E. Bowell	·	5.0 km (3.1 mi)	MPC · JPL
3024 Hainan	1981 UW_{9}	Hainan	October 23, 1981	Nanking	Purple Mountain	CYB	37 km (23 mi)	MPC · JPL
3025 Higson	1982 QR	Higson	August 20, 1982	Palomar	C. S. Shoemaker, E. M. Shoemaker	(3025)	46 km (29 mi)	MPC · JPL
3026 Sarastro	1977 TA_{1}	Sarastro	October 12, 1977	Zimmerwald	P. Wild	·	16 km (9.9 mi)	MPC · JPL
3027 Shavarsh	1978 PQ_{2}	Shavarsh	August 8, 1978	Nauchnij	N. S. Chernykh	MIS	13 km (8.1 mi)	MPC · JPL
3028 Zhangguoxi	1978 TA_{2}	Zhangguoxi	October 9, 1978	Nanking	Purple Mountain	EOS	26 km (16 mi)	MPC · JPL
3029 Sanders	1981 EA_{8}	Sanders	March 1, 1981	Siding Spring	S. J. Bus	·	6.0 km (3.7 mi)	MPC · JPL
3030 Vehrenberg	1981 EH_{16}	Vehrenberg	March 1, 1981	Siding Spring	S. J. Bus	·	4.3 km (2.7 mi)	MPC · JPL
3031 Houston	1984 CX	Houston	February 8, 1984	Anderson Mesa	E. Bowell	·	6.4 km (4.0 mi)	MPC · JPL
3032 Evans	1984 CA_{1}	Evans	February 8, 1984	Anderson Mesa	E. Bowell	KOR	14 km (8.7 mi)	MPC · JPL
3033 Holbaek	1984 EJ	Holbaek	March 5, 1984	Brorfelde	K. Augustesen, P. Jensen, Fogh Olsen, H. J.	slow	8.4 km (5.2 mi)	MPC · JPL
3034 Climenhaga	A917 SE	Climenhaga	September 24, 1917	Heidelberg	M. F. Wolf	moon	10 km (6.2 mi)	MPC · JPL
3035 Chambers	A924 EJ	Chambers	March 7, 1924	Heidelberg	K. Reinmuth	·	14 km (8.7 mi)	MPC · JPL
3036 Krat	1937 TO	Krat	October 11, 1937	Crimea-Simeis	G. N. Neujmin	·	43 km (27 mi)	MPC · JPL
3037 Alku	1944 BA	Alku	January 17, 1944	Turku	Y. Väisälä	·	30 km (19 mi)	MPC · JPL
3038 Bernes	1978 QB_{3}	Bernes	August 31, 1978	Nauchnij	N. S. Chernykh	·	3.6 km (2.2 mi)	MPC · JPL
3039 Yangel	1978 SP_{2}	Yangel	September 26, 1978	Nauchnij	L. V. Zhuravleva	·	9.4 km (5.8 mi)	MPC · JPL
3040 Kozai	1979 BA	Kozai	January 23, 1979	Cerro Tololo	W. Liller	·	3.4 km (2.1 mi)	MPC · JPL
3041 Webb	1980 GD	Webb	April 15, 1980	Anderson Mesa	E. Bowell	EUN	8.2 km (5.1 mi)	MPC · JPL
3042 Zelinsky	1981 EF_{10}	Zelinsky	March 1, 1981	Siding Spring	S. J. Bus	·	4.6 km (2.9 mi)	MPC · JPL
3043 San Diego	1982 SA	San Diego	September 20, 1982	Palomar	E. F. Helin	H · slow	5.0 km (3.1 mi)	MPC · JPL
3044 Saltykov	1983 RE_{3}	Saltykov	September 2, 1983	Nauchnij	Metlova, N. V., N. E. Kuročkin	·	25 km (16 mi)	MPC · JPL
3045 Alois	1984 AW	Alois	January 8, 1984	Anderson Mesa	Wagner, J.	·	27 km (17 mi)	MPC · JPL
3046 Molière	4120 P-L	Molière	September 24, 1960	Palomar	C. J. van Houten, I. van Houten-Groeneveld, T. Gehrels	·	21 km (13 mi)	MPC · JPL
3047 Goethe	6091 P-L	Goethe	September 24, 1960	Palomar	C. J. van Houten, I. van Houten-Groeneveld, T. Gehrels	·	5.8 km (3.6 mi)	MPC · JPL
3048 Guangzhou	1964 TH_{1}	Guangzhou	October 8, 1964	Nanking	Purple Mountain	NYS	6.3 km (3.9 mi)	MPC · JPL
3049 Kuzbass	1968 FH	Kuzbass	March 28, 1968	Nauchnij	T. M. Smirnova	THM	20 km (12 mi)	MPC · JPL
3050 Carrera	1972 NW	Carrera	July 13, 1972	Cerro El Roble	C. Torres	·	4.3 km (2.7 mi)	MPC · JPL
3051 Nantong	1974 YP	Nantong	December 19, 1974	Nanking	Purple Mountain	·	16 km (9.9 mi)	MPC · JPL
3052 Herzen	1976 YJ_{3}	Herzen	December 16, 1976	Nauchnij	L. I. Chernykh	·	11 km (6.8 mi)	MPC · JPL
3053 Dresden	1977 QS	Dresden	August 18, 1977	Nauchnij	N. S. Chernykh	·	3.5 km (2.2 mi)	MPC · JPL
3054 Strugatskia	1977 RE_{7}	Strugatskia	September 11, 1977	Nauchnij	N. S. Chernykh	THM	27 km (17 mi)	MPC · JPL
3055 Annapavlova	1978 TR_{3}	Annapavlova	October 4, 1978	Nauchnij	T. M. Smirnova	MAR	9.4 km (5.8 mi)	MPC · JPL
3056 INAG	1978 VD_{1}	INAG	November 1, 1978	Caussols	K. Tomita	slow	5.2 km (3.2 mi)	MPC · JPL
3057 Mälaren	1981 EG	Mälaren	March 9, 1981	Anderson Mesa	E. Bowell	·	5.1 km (3.2 mi)	MPC · JPL
3058 Delmary	1981 EO_{17}	Delmary	March 1, 1981	Siding Spring	S. J. Bus	·	4.1 km (2.5 mi)	MPC · JPL
3059 Pryor	1981 EF_{23}	Pryor	March 3, 1981	Siding Spring	S. J. Bus	·	5.2 km (3.2 mi)	MPC · JPL
3060 Delcano	1982 RD_{1}	Delcano	September 12, 1982	Zimmerwald	P. Wild	·	7.1 km (4.4 mi)	MPC · JPL
3061 Cook	1982 UB_{1}	Cook	October 21, 1982	Anderson Mesa	E. Bowell	THM · slow	23 km (14 mi)	MPC · JPL
3062 Wren	1982 XC	Wren	December 14, 1982	Anderson Mesa	E. Bowell	EOS	23 km (14 mi)	MPC · JPL
3063 Makhaon	1983 PV	Makhaon	August 4, 1983	Nauchnij	L. G. Karachkina	L4	112 km (70 mi)	MPC · JPL
3064 Zimmer	1984 BB_{1}	Zimmer	January 28, 1984	Anderson Mesa	E. Bowell	NYS · slow	13 km (8.1 mi)	MPC · JPL
3065 Sarahill	1984 CV	Sarahill	February 8, 1984	Anderson Mesa	E. Bowell	·	19 km (12 mi)	MPC · JPL
3066 McFadden	1984 EO	McFadden	March 1, 1984	Anderson Mesa	E. Bowell	·	14 km (8.7 mi)	MPC · JPL
3067 Akhmatova	1982 TE_{2}	Akhmatova	October 14, 1982	Nauchnij	L. V. Zhuravleva, L. G. Karachkina	·	6.3 km (3.9 mi)	MPC · JPL
3068 Khanina	1982 YJ_{1}	Khanina	December 23, 1982	Nauchnij	L. G. Karachkina	·	6.5 km (4.0 mi)	MPC · JPL
3069 Heyrovský	1982 UG_{2}	Heyrovský	October 16, 1982	Kleť	Z. Vávrová	NYS	4.7 km (2.9 mi)	MPC · JPL
3070 Aitken	1949 GK	Aitken	April 4, 1949	Brooklyn	Indiana University	·	5.2 km (3.2 mi)	MPC · JPL
3071 Nesterov	1973 FT_{1}	Nesterov	March 28, 1973	Nauchnij	T. M. Smirnova	THM	20 km (12 mi)	MPC · JPL
3072 Vilnius	1978 RS_{1}	Vilnius	September 5, 1978	Nauchnij	N. S. Chernykh	(883)	4.3 km (2.7 mi)	MPC · JPL
3073 Kursk	1979 SW_{11}	Kursk	September 24, 1979	Nauchnij	N. S. Chernykh	moon	5.2 km (3.2 mi)	MPC · JPL
3074 Popov	1979 YE_{9}	Popov	December 24, 1979	Nauchnij	L. V. Zhuravleva	·	9.9 km (6.2 mi)	MPC · JPL
3075 Bornmann	1981 EY_{15}	Bornmann	March 1, 1981	Siding Spring	S. J. Bus	·	4.5 km (2.8 mi)	MPC · JPL
3076 Garber	1982 RB_{1}	Garber	September 13, 1982	Harvard Observatory	Oak Ridge Observatory	moon	4.9 km (3.0 mi)	MPC · JPL
3077 Henderson	1982 SK	Henderson	September 22, 1982	Anderson Mesa	E. Bowell	·	5.2 km (3.2 mi)	MPC · JPL
3078 Horrocks	1984 FG	Horrocks	March 31, 1984	Anderson Mesa	E. Bowell	·	28 km (17 mi)	MPC · JPL
3079 Schiller	2578 P-L	Schiller	September 24, 1960	Palomar	C. J. van Houten, I. van Houten-Groeneveld, T. Gehrels	·	6.7 km (4.2 mi)	MPC · JPL
3080 Moisseiev	1935 TE	Moisseiev	October 3, 1935	Crimea-Simeis	P. F. Shajn	EUN	13 km (8.1 mi)	MPC · JPL
3081 Martinůboh	1971 UP	Martinůboh	October 26, 1971	Hamburg-Bergedorf	L. Kohoutek	·	7.3 km (4.5 mi)	MPC · JPL
3082 Dzhalil	1972 KE	Dzhalil	May 17, 1972	Nauchnij	T. M. Smirnova	·	18 km (11 mi)	MPC · JPL
3083 OAFA	1974 MH	OAFA	June 17, 1974	El Leoncito	Félix Aguilar Observatory	·	3.6 km (2.2 mi)	MPC · JPL
3084 Kondratyuk	1977 QB_{1}	Kondratyuk	August 19, 1977	Nauchnij	N. S. Chernykh	·	7.7 km (4.8 mi)	MPC · JPL
3085 Donna	1980 DA	Donna	February 18, 1980	Harvard Observatory	Harvard Observatory	·	7.0 km (4.3 mi)	MPC · JPL
3086 Kalbaugh	1980 XE	Kalbaugh	December 4, 1980	Anderson Mesa	E. Bowell	H	4.6 km (2.9 mi)	MPC · JPL
3087 Beatrice Tinsley	1981 QJ_{1}	Beatrice Tinsley	August 30, 1981	Lake Tekapo	A. C. Gilmore, P. M. Kilmartin	·	6.6 km (4.1 mi)	MPC · JPL
3088 Jinxiuzhonghua	1981 UX_{9}	Jinxiuzhonghua	October 24, 1981	Nanking	Purple Mountain	EOS ·	17 km (11 mi)	MPC · JPL
3089 Oujianquan	1981 XK_{2}	Oujianquan	December 3, 1981	Nanking	Purple Mountain	·	36 km (22 mi)	MPC · JPL
3090 Tjossem	1982 AN	Tjossem	January 4, 1982	Palomar	Gibson, J.	VER	14 km (8.7 mi)	MPC · JPL
3091 van den Heuvel	6081 P-L	van den Heuvel	September 24, 1960	Palomar	C. J. van Houten, I. van Houten-Groeneveld, T. Gehrels	NYS	4.3 km (2.7 mi)	MPC · JPL
3092 Herodotus	6550 P-L	Herodotus	September 24, 1960	Palomar	C. J. van Houten, I. van Houten-Groeneveld, T. Gehrels	CYB	30 km (19 mi)	MPC · JPL
3093 Bergholz	1971 MG	Bergholz	June 28, 1971	Nauchnij	T. M. Smirnova	EUN	13 km (8.1 mi)	MPC · JPL
3094 Chukokkala	1979 FE_{2}	Chukokkala	March 23, 1979	Nauchnij	N. S. Chernykh	MAR	23 km (14 mi)	MPC · JPL
3095 Omarkhayyam	1980 RT_{2}	Omarkhayyam	September 8, 1980	Nauchnij	L. V. Zhuravleva	CYB	30 km (19 mi)	MPC · JPL
3096 Bezruč	1981 QC_{1}	Bezruč	August 28, 1981	Kleť	Z. Vávrová	ADE	17 km (11 mi)	MPC · JPL
3097 Tacitus	2011 P-L	Tacitus	September 24, 1960	Palomar	C. J. van Houten, I. van Houten-Groeneveld, T. Gehrels	·	21 km (13 mi)	MPC · JPL
3098 van Sprang	4579 P-L	van Sprang	September 24, 1960	Palomar	C. J. van Houten, I. van Houten-Groeneveld, T. Gehrels	·	3.6 km (2.2 mi)	MPC · JPL
3099 Hergenrother	1940 GF	Hergenrother	April 3, 1940	Turku	Y. Väisälä	·	15 km (9.3 mi)	MPC · JPL
3100 Zimmerman	1977 EQ_{1}	Zimmerman	March 13, 1977	Nauchnij	N. S. Chernykh	·	5.3 km (3.3 mi)	MPC · JPL

== 3101–3200 ==
back to top

Designation			Discovery			Properties		Ref
Permanent	Provisional	Named after	Date	Site	Discoverer(s)	Category	Diam.	Ref
3101 Goldberger	1978 GB	Goldberger	April 11, 1978	Palomar	E. F. Helin, G. Grueff, Wall, J. V.	H	3.4 km (2.1 mi)	MPC · JPL
3102 Krok	1981 QA	Krok	August 21, 1981	Kleť	L. Brožek	AMO +1 km (0.62 mi) · slow	1.6 km (0.99 mi)	MPC · JPL
3103 Eger	1982 BB	Eger	January 20, 1982	Piszkéstető	M. Lovas	APO +1 km (0.62 mi)	1.5 km (0.93 mi)	MPC · JPL
3104 Dürer	1982 BB_{1}	Dürer	January 24, 1982	Anderson Mesa	E. Bowell	·	17 km (11 mi)	MPC · JPL
3105 Stumpff	A907 PB	Stumpff	August 8, 1907	Heidelberg	A. Kopff	·	7.0 km (4.3 mi)	MPC · JPL
3106 Morabito	1981 EE	Morabito	March 9, 1981	Anderson Mesa	E. Bowell	·	26 km (16 mi)	MPC · JPL
3107 Weaver	1981 JG_{2}	Weaver	May 5, 1981	Palomar	C. S. Shoemaker	·	5.8 km (3.6 mi)	MPC · JPL
3108 Lyubov	1972 QM	Lyubov	August 18, 1972	Nauchnij	L. V. Zhuravleva	·	4.4 km (2.7 mi)	MPC · JPL
3109 Machin	1974 DC	Machin	February 19, 1974	Hamburg-Bergedorf	L. Kohoutek	·	24 km (15 mi)	MPC · JPL
3110 Wagman	1975 SC	Wagman	September 28, 1975	Anderson Mesa	H. L. Giclas	(5)	8.0 km (5.0 mi)	MPC · JPL
3111 Misuzu	1977 DX_{8}	Misuzu	February 19, 1977	Kiso	H. Kosai, K. Furukawa	·	4.6 km (2.9 mi)	MPC · JPL
3112 Velimir	1977 QC_{5}	Velimir	August 22, 1977	Nauchnij	N. S. Chernykh	·	13 km (8.1 mi)	MPC · JPL
3113 Chizhevskij	1978 RO	Chizhevskij	September 1, 1978	Nauchnij	N. S. Chernykh	·	4.9 km (3.0 mi)	MPC · JPL
3114 Ercilla	1980 FB_{12}	Ercilla	March 19, 1980	Cerro El Roble	University of Chile	NYS	5.0 km (3.1 mi)	MPC · JPL
3115 Baily	1981 PL	Baily	August 3, 1981	Anderson Mesa	E. Bowell	·	17 km (11 mi)	MPC · JPL
3116 Goodricke	1983 CF	Goodricke	February 11, 1983	Anderson Mesa	E. Bowell	·	7.8 km (4.8 mi)	MPC · JPL
3117 Niépce	1983 CM_{1}	Niépce	February 11, 1983	Anderson Mesa	N. G. Thomas	KOR	10 km (6.2 mi)	MPC · JPL
3118 Claytonsmith	1974 OD	Claytonsmith	July 19, 1974	El Leoncito	Félix Aguilar Observatory	·	37 km (23 mi)	MPC · JPL
3119 Dobronravin	1972 YX	Dobronravin	December 30, 1972	Nauchnij	T. M. Smirnova	·	16 km (9.9 mi)	MPC · JPL
3120 Dangrania	1979 RZ	Dangrania	September 14, 1979	Nauchnij	N. S. Chernykh	·	15 km (9.3 mi)	MPC · JPL
3121 Tamines	1981 EV	Tamines	March 2, 1981	La Silla	H. Debehogne, G. de Sanctis	·	6.1 km (3.8 mi)	MPC · JPL
3122 Florence	1981 ET_{3}	Florence	March 2, 1981	Siding Spring	S. J. Bus	AMO +1 km (0.62 mi) · PHA · moon	4.9 km (3.0 mi)	MPC · JPL
3123 Dunham	1981 QF_{2}	Dunham	August 30, 1981	Anderson Mesa	E. Bowell	slow	12 km (7.5 mi)	MPC · JPL
3124 Kansas	1981 VB	Kansas	November 3, 1981	Kitt Peak	D. J. Tholen	PAD	11 km (6.8 mi)	MPC · JPL
3125 Hay	1982 BJ_{1}	Hay	January 24, 1982	Anderson Mesa	E. Bowell	·	15 km (9.3 mi)	MPC · JPL
3126 Davydov	1969 TP_{1}	Davydov	October 8, 1969	Nauchnij	L. I. Chernykh	EOS	14 km (8.7 mi)	MPC · JPL
3127 Bagration	1973 ST_{4}	Bagration	September 27, 1973	Nauchnij	L. I. Chernykh	·	8.4 km (5.2 mi)	MPC · JPL
3128 Obruchev	1979 FJ_{2}	Obruchev	March 23, 1979	Nauchnij	N. S. Chernykh	THM	20 km (12 mi)	MPC · JPL
3129 Bonestell	1979 MK_{2}	Bonestell	June 25, 1979	Siding Spring	E. F. Helin, S. J. Bus	·	7.2 km (4.5 mi)	MPC · JPL
3130 Hillary	1981 YO	Hillary	December 20, 1981	Kleť	A. Mrkos	NYS	13 km (8.1 mi)	MPC · JPL
3131 Mason-Dixon	1982 BM_{1}	Mason-Dixon	January 24, 1982	Anderson Mesa	E. Bowell	KOR	10 km (6.2 mi)	MPC · JPL
3132 Landgraf	1940 WL	Landgraf	November 29, 1940	Turku	L. Oterma	slow	36 km (22 mi)	MPC · JPL
3133 Sendai	A907 TC	Sendai	October 4, 1907	Heidelberg	A. Kopff	·	7.2 km (4.5 mi)	MPC · JPL
3134 Kostinsky	A921 VA	Kostinsky	November 5, 1921	Crimea-Simeis	S. Belyavsky	HIL · 3:2	50 km (31 mi)	MPC · JPL
3135 Lauer	1981 EC_{9}	Lauer	March 1, 1981	Siding Spring	S. J. Bus	·	6.8 km (4.2 mi)	MPC · JPL
3136 Anshan	1981 WD_{4}	Anshan	November 18, 1981	Nanking	Purple Mountain	·	19 km (12 mi)	MPC · JPL
3137 Horky	1982 SM_{1}	Horky	September 16, 1982	Kleť	A. Mrkos	·	6.7 km (4.2 mi)	MPC · JPL
3138 Ciney	1980 KL	Ciney	May 22, 1980	La Silla	H. Debehogne	slow	5.5 km (3.4 mi)	MPC · JPL
3139 Shantou	1980 VL_{1}	Shantou	November 11, 1980	Nanking	Purple Mountain	·	37 km (23 mi)	MPC · JPL
3140 Stellafane	1983 AO	Stellafane	January 9, 1983	Anderson Mesa	B. A. Skiff	EOS	20 km (12 mi)	MPC · JPL
3141 Buchar	1984 RH	Buchar	September 2, 1984	Kleť	A. Mrkos	CYB	36 km (22 mi)	MPC · JPL
3142 Kilopi	1937 AC	Kilopi	January 9, 1937	Nice	A. Patry	·	8.0 km (5.0 mi)	MPC · JPL
3143 Genecampbell	1980 UA	Genecampbell	October 31, 1980	Harvard Observatory	Harvard Observatory	KOR	8.5 km (5.3 mi)	MPC · JPL
3144 Brosche	1931 TY_{1}	Brosche	October 10, 1931	Heidelberg	K. Reinmuth	·	4.4 km (2.7 mi)	MPC · JPL
3145 Walter Adams	1955 RY	Walter Adams	September 14, 1955	Brooklyn	Indiana University	·	3.4 km (2.1 mi)	MPC · JPL
3146 Dato	1972 KG	Dato	May 17, 1972	Nauchnij	T. M. Smirnova	·	11 km (6.8 mi)	MPC · JPL
3147 Samantha	1976 YU_{3}	Samantha	December 16, 1976	Nauchnij	L. I. Chernykh	·	10 km (6.2 mi)	MPC · JPL
3148 Grechko	1979 SA_{12}	Grechko	September 24, 1979	Nauchnij	N. S. Chernykh	THM	17 km (11 mi)	MPC · JPL
3149 Okudzhava	1981 SH	Okudzhava	September 22, 1981	Kleť	Z. Vávrová	·	4.6 km (2.9 mi)	MPC · JPL
3150 Tosa	1983 CB	Tosa	February 11, 1983	Geisei	T. Seki	·	33 km (21 mi)	MPC · JPL
3151 Talbot	1983 HF	Talbot	April 18, 1983	Anderson Mesa	N. G. Thomas	·	14 km (8.7 mi)	MPC · JPL
3152 Jones	1983 LF	Jones	June 7, 1983	Lake Tekapo	A. C. Gilmore, P. M. Kilmartin	·	31 km (19 mi)	MPC · JPL
3153 Lincoln	1984 SH_{3}	Lincoln	September 28, 1984	Anderson Mesa	B. A. Skiff	·	5.0 km (3.1 mi)	MPC · JPL
3154 Grant	1984 SO_{3}	Grant	September 28, 1984	Anderson Mesa	B. A. Skiff	THM	10 km (6.2 mi)	MPC · JPL
3155 Lee	1984 SP_{3}	Lee	September 28, 1984	Anderson Mesa	B. A. Skiff	V	7.0 km (4.3 mi)	MPC · JPL
3156 Ellington	1953 EE	Ellington	March 15, 1953	Uccle	A. Schmitt	·	31 km (19 mi)	MPC · JPL
3157 Novikov	1973 SX_{3}	Novikov	September 25, 1973	Nauchnij	L. V. Zhuravleva	(1298)	30 km (19 mi)	MPC · JPL
3158 Anga	1976 SU_{2}	Anga	September 24, 1976	Nauchnij	N. S. Chernykh	MAR	7.3 km (4.5 mi)	MPC · JPL
3159 Prokofʹev	1976 US_{2}	Prokofʹev	October 26, 1976	Nauchnij	T. M. Smirnova	MAR ·	9.8 km (6.1 mi)	MPC · JPL
3160 Angerhofer	1980 LE	Angerhofer	June 14, 1980	Anderson Mesa	E. Bowell	·	4.8 km (3.0 mi)	MPC · JPL
3161 Beadell	1980 TB_{5}	Beadell	October 9, 1980	Palomar	C. S. Shoemaker	·	14 km (8.7 mi)	MPC · JPL
3162 Nostalgia	1980 YH	Nostalgia	December 16, 1980	Anderson Mesa	E. Bowell	·	29 km (18 mi)	MPC · JPL
3163 Randi	1981 QM	Randi	August 28, 1981	Palomar	C. T. Kowal	·	3.9 km (2.4 mi)	MPC · JPL
3164 Prast	6562 P-L	Prast	September 24, 1960	Palomar	C. J. van Houten, I. van Houten-Groeneveld, T. Gehrels	THM	19 km (12 mi)	MPC · JPL
3165 Mikawa	1984 QE	Mikawa	August 31, 1984	Toyota	K. Suzuki, T. Urata	·	7.7 km (4.8 mi)	MPC · JPL
3166 Klondike	1940 FG	Klondike	March 30, 1940	Turku	Y. Väisälä	slow	7.8 km (4.8 mi)	MPC · JPL
3167 Babcock	1955 RS	Babcock	September 13, 1955	Brooklyn	Indiana University	·	13 km (8.1 mi)	MPC · JPL
3168 Lomnický Štít	1980 XM	Lomnický Štít	December 1, 1980	Kleť	A. Mrkos	EOS	13 km (8.1 mi)	MPC · JPL
3169 Ostro	1981 LA	Ostro	June 4, 1981	Anderson Mesa	E. Bowell	H · moon	4.7 km (2.9 mi)	MPC · JPL
3170 Dzhanibekov	1979 SS_{11}	Dzhanibekov	September 24, 1979	Nauchnij	N. S. Chernykh	KOR	9.6 km (6.0 mi)	MPC · JPL
3171 Wangshouguan	1979 WO	Wangshouguan	November 19, 1979	Nanking	Purple Mountain	·	39 km (24 mi)	MPC · JPL
3172 Hirst	1981 WW	Hirst	November 24, 1981	Anderson Mesa	E. Bowell	NYS	5.6 km (3.5 mi)	MPC · JPL
3173 McNaught	1981 WY	McNaught	November 24, 1981	Anderson Mesa	E. Bowell	·	6.0 km (3.7 mi)	MPC · JPL
3174 Alcock	1984 UV	Alcock	October 26, 1984	Anderson Mesa	E. Bowell	THM	20 km (12 mi)	MPC · JPL
3175 Netto	1979 YP	Netto	December 16, 1979	La Silla	H. Debehogne, Netto, E. R.	·	5.9 km (3.7 mi)	MPC · JPL
3176 Paolicchi	1980 VR_{1}	Paolicchi	November 13, 1980	Piszkéstető	Z. Knežević	·	41 km (25 mi)	MPC · JPL
3177 Chillicothe	1934 AK	Chillicothe	January 8, 1934	Flagstaff	H. L. Giclas	·	15 km (9.3 mi)	MPC · JPL
3178 Yoshitsune	1984 WA	Yoshitsune	November 21, 1984	Toyota	K. Suzuki, T. Urata	·	14 km (8.7 mi)	MPC · JPL
3179 Beruti	1962 FA	Beruti	March 31, 1962	La Plata Observatory	La Plata	THM	21 km (13 mi)	MPC · JPL
3180 Morgan	1962 RO	Morgan	September 7, 1962	Brooklyn	Indiana University	·	4.3 km (2.7 mi)	MPC · JPL
3181 Ahnert	1964 EC	Ahnert	March 8, 1964	Tautenburg Observatory	F. Börngen	·	8.0 km (5.0 mi)	MPC · JPL
3182 Shimanto	1984 WC	Shimanto	November 27, 1984	Geisei	T. Seki	EUN	8.9 km (5.5 mi)	MPC · JPL
3183 Franzkaiser	1949 PP	Franzkaiser	August 2, 1949	Heidelberg	K. Reinmuth	·	15 km (9.3 mi)	MPC · JPL
3184 Raab	1949 QC	Raab	August 22, 1949	Johannesburg	E. L. Johnson	slow?	19 km (12 mi)	MPC · JPL
3185 Clintford	1953 VY_{1}	Clintford	November 11, 1953	Brooklyn	Indiana University	·	10 km (6.2 mi)	MPC · JPL
3186 Manuilova	1973 SD_{3}	Manuilova	September 22, 1973	Nauchnij	N. S. Chernykh	THM	14 km (8.7 mi)	MPC · JPL
3187 Dalian	1977 TO_{3}	Dalian	October 10, 1977	Nanking	Purple Mountain	moon	6.2 km (3.9 mi)	MPC · JPL
3188 Jekabsons	1978 OM	Jekabsons	July 28, 1978	Bickley	Perth Observatory	·	4.3 km (2.7 mi)	MPC · JPL
3189 Penza	1978 RF_{6}	Penza	September 13, 1978	Nauchnij	N. S. Chernykh	·	11 km (6.8 mi)	MPC · JPL
3190 Aposhanskij	1978 SR_{6}	Aposhanskij	September 26, 1978	Nauchnij	L. V. Zhuravleva	EOS	8.9 km (5.5 mi)	MPC · JPL
3191 Svanetia	1979 SX_{9}	Svanetia	September 22, 1979	Nauchnij	N. S. Chernykh	KOR	9.3 km (5.8 mi)	MPC · JPL
3192 A'Hearn	1982 BY_{1}	A'Hearn	January 30, 1982	Anderson Mesa	E. Bowell	·	4.4 km (2.7 mi)	MPC · JPL
3193 Elliot	1982 DJ	Elliot	February 20, 1982	Anderson Mesa	E. Bowell	·	5.9 km (3.7 mi)	MPC · JPL
3194 Dorsey	1982 KD_{1}	Dorsey	May 27, 1982	Palomar	C. S. Shoemaker	EOS	14 km (8.7 mi)	MPC · JPL
3195 Fedchenko	1978 PT_{2}	Fedchenko	August 8, 1978	Nauchnij	N. S. Chernykh	KOR	8.6 km (5.3 mi)	MPC · JPL
3196 Maklaj	1978 RY	Maklaj	September 1, 1978	Nauchnij	N. S. Chernykh	·	14 km (8.7 mi)	MPC · JPL
3197 Weissman	1981 AD	Weissman	January 1, 1981	Anderson Mesa	E. Bowell	·	19 km (12 mi)	MPC · JPL
3198 Wallonia	1981 YH_{1}	Wallonia	December 30, 1981	Haute-Provence	F. Dossin	·	6.8 km (4.2 mi)	MPC · JPL
3199 Nefertiti	1982 RA	Nefertiti	September 13, 1982	Palomar	C. S. Shoemaker, E. M. Shoemaker	AMO +1 km (0.62 mi)	2.2 km (1.4 mi)	MPC · JPL
3200 Phaethon	1983 TB	Phaethon	October 11, 1983	IRAS	IRAS	APO +1 km (0.62 mi) · PHA	6.2 km (3.9 mi)	MPC · JPL

== 3201–3300 ==
back to top

Designation			Discovery			Properties		Ref
Permanent	Provisional	Named after	Date	Site	Discoverer(s)	Category	Diam.	Ref
3201 Sijthoff	6560 P-L	Sijthoff	September 24, 1960	Palomar	C. J. van Houten, I. van Houten-Groeneveld, T. Gehrels	·	5.0 km (3.1 mi)	MPC · JPL
3202 Graff	A908 AA	Graff	January 3, 1908	Heidelberg	M. F. Wolf	3:2	36 km (22 mi)	MPC · JPL
3203 Huth	1938 SL	Huth	September 18, 1938	Sonneberg	C. Hoffmeister	·	4.3 km (2.7 mi)	MPC · JPL
3204 Lindgren	1978 RH	Lindgren	September 1, 1978	Nauchnij	N. S. Chernykh	·	20 km (12 mi)	MPC · JPL
3205 Boksenberg	1979 MO_{6}	Boksenberg	June 25, 1979	Siding Spring	E. F. Helin, S. J. Bus	ADE	12 km (7.5 mi)	MPC · JPL
3206 Wuhan	1980 VN_{1}	Wuhan	November 13, 1980	Nanking	Purple Mountain	·	5.4 km (3.4 mi)	MPC · JPL
3207 Spinrad	1981 EY_{25}	Spinrad	March 2, 1981	Siding Spring	S. J. Bus	KOR	9.4 km (5.8 mi)	MPC · JPL
3208 Lunn	1981 JM	Lunn	May 3, 1981	Anderson Mesa	E. Bowell	THM ·	20 km (12 mi)	MPC · JPL
3209 Buchwald	1982 BL_{1}	Buchwald	January 24, 1982	Anderson Mesa	E. Bowell	·	5.8 km (3.6 mi)	MPC · JPL
3210 Lupishko	1983 WH_{1}	Lupishko	November 29, 1983	Anderson Mesa	E. Bowell	·	19 km (12 mi)	MPC · JPL
3211 Louispharailda	1931 CE	Louispharailda	February 10, 1931	Williams Bay	G. Van Biesbroeck	·	8.3 km (5.2 mi)	MPC · JPL
3212 Agricola	1938 DH_{2}	Agricola	February 19, 1938	Turku	Y. Väisälä	·	4.4 km (2.7 mi)	MPC · JPL
3213 Smolensk	1977 NQ	Smolensk	July 14, 1977	Nauchnij	N. S. Chernykh	THM	18 km (11 mi)	MPC · JPL
3214 Makarenko	1978 TZ_{6}	Makarenko	October 2, 1978	Nauchnij	L. V. Zhuravleva	EOS	18 km (11 mi)	MPC · JPL
3215 Lapko	1980 BQ	Lapko	January 23, 1980	Nauchnij	L. G. Karachkina	(1298)	20 km (12 mi)	MPC · JPL
3216 Harrington	1980 RB	Harrington	September 4, 1980	Anderson Mesa	E. Bowell	·	4.0 km (2.5 mi)	MPC · JPL
3217 Seidelmann	1980 RK	Seidelmann	September 2, 1980	Anderson Mesa	E. Bowell	·	5.1 km (3.2 mi)	MPC · JPL
3218 Delphine	6611 P-L	Delphine	September 24, 1960	Palomar	C. J. van Houten, I. van Houten-Groeneveld, T. Gehrels	·	4.9 km (3.0 mi)	MPC · JPL
3219 Komaki	1934 CX	Komaki	February 4, 1934	Heidelberg	K. Reinmuth	·	16 km (9.9 mi)	MPC · JPL
3220 Murayama	1951 WF	Murayama	November 22, 1951	Nice	M. Laugier	moon	4.9 km (3.0 mi)	MPC · JPL
3221 Changshi	1981 XF_{2}	Changshi	December 2, 1981	Nanking	Purple Mountain	·	6.0 km (3.7 mi)	MPC · JPL
3222 Liller	1983 NJ	Liller	July 10, 1983	Anderson Mesa	E. Bowell	·	35 km (22 mi)	MPC · JPL
3223 Forsius	1942 RN	Forsius	September 7, 1942	Turku	Y. Väisälä	·	20 km (12 mi)	MPC · JPL
3224 Irkutsk	1977 RL_{6}	Irkutsk	September 11, 1977	Nauchnij	N. S. Chernykh	·	25 km (16 mi)	MPC · JPL
3225 Hoag	1982 QQ	Hoag	August 20, 1982	Palomar	C. S. Shoemaker, E. M. Shoemaker	H	6.2 km (3.9 mi)	MPC · JPL
3226 Plinius	6565 P-L	Plinius	September 24, 1960	Palomar	C. J. van Houten, I. van Houten-Groeneveld, T. Gehrels	KOR	7.0 km (4.3 mi)	MPC · JPL
3227 Hasegawa	1928 DF	Hasegawa	February 24, 1928	Heidelberg	K. Reinmuth	·	7.9 km (4.9 mi)	MPC · JPL
3228 Pire	1935 CL	Pire	February 8, 1935	Uccle	S. J. Arend	NYS	16 km (9.9 mi)	MPC · JPL
3229 Solnhofen	A916 PC	Solnhofen	August 9, 1916	Hamburg-Bergedorf	H. Thiele	·	7.1 km (4.4 mi)	MPC · JPL
3230 Vampilov	1972 LE	Vampilov	June 8, 1972	Nauchnij	N. S. Chernykh	·	23 km (14 mi)	MPC · JPL
3231 Mila	1972 RU_{2}	Mila	September 4, 1972	Nauchnij	L. V. Zhuravleva	·	13 km (8.1 mi)	MPC · JPL
3232 Brest	1974 SL	Brest	September 19, 1974	Nauchnij	L. I. Chernykh	EOS	17 km (11 mi)	MPC · JPL
3233 Krišbarons	1977 RA_{6}	Krišbarons	September 9, 1977	Nauchnij	N. S. Chernykh	slow	4.1 km (2.5 mi)	MPC · JPL
3234 Hergiani	1978 QO_{2}	Hergiani	August 31, 1978	Nauchnij	N. S. Chernykh	·	14 km (8.7 mi)	MPC · JPL
3235 Melchior	1981 EL_{1}	Melchior	March 6, 1981	La Silla	H. Debehogne, G. de Sanctis	·	9.2 km (5.7 mi)	MPC · JPL
3236 Strand	1982 BH_{1}	Strand	January 24, 1982	Anderson Mesa	E. Bowell	·	5.0 km (3.1 mi)	MPC · JPL
3237 Victorplatt	1984 SA_{5}	Victorplatt	September 25, 1984	Palomar	J. Platt	EOS	28 km (17 mi)	MPC · JPL
3238 Timresovia	1975 VB_{9}	Timresovia	November 8, 1975	Nauchnij	N. S. Chernykh	ADE	13 km (8.1 mi)	MPC · JPL
3239 Meizhou	1978 UJ_{2}	Meizhou	October 29, 1978	Nanking	Purple Mountain	·	3.4 km (2.1 mi)	MPC · JPL
3240 Laocoon	1978 VG_{6}	Laocoon	November 7, 1978	Palomar	E. F. Helin, S. J. Bus	L5	52 km (32 mi)	MPC · JPL
3241 Yeshuhua	1978 WH_{14}	Yeshuhua	November 28, 1978	Nanking	Purple Mountain	·	17 km (11 mi)	MPC · JPL
3242 Bakhchisaraj	1979 SG_{9}	Bakhchisaraj	September 22, 1979	Nauchnij	N. S. Chernykh	EUN	7.7 km (4.8 mi)	MPC · JPL
3243 Skytel	1980 DC	Skytel	February 19, 1980	Harvard Observatory	Harvard Observatory	EOS	10 km (6.2 mi)	MPC · JPL
3244 Petronius	4008 P-L	Petronius	September 24, 1960	Palomar	C. J. van Houten, I. van Houten-Groeneveld, T. Gehrels	·	3.8 km (2.4 mi)	MPC · JPL
3245 Jensch	1973 UL_{5}	Jensch	October 27, 1973	Tautenburg Observatory	F. Börngen	THM	13 km (8.1 mi)	MPC · JPL
3246 Bidstrup	1976 GQ_{3}	Bidstrup	April 1, 1976	Nauchnij	N. S. Chernykh	·	22 km (14 mi)	MPC · JPL
3247 Di Martino	1981 YE	Di Martino	December 30, 1981	Anderson Mesa	E. Bowell	·	14 km (8.7 mi)	MPC · JPL
3248 Farinella	1982 FK	Farinella	March 21, 1982	Anderson Mesa	E. Bowell	·	37 km (23 mi)	MPC · JPL
3249 Musashino	1977 DT_{4}	Musashino	February 18, 1977	Kiso	H. Kosai, K. Furukawa	·	5.1 km (3.2 mi)	MPC · JPL
3250 Martebo	1979 EB	Martebo	March 6, 1979	Mount Stromlo	C.-I. Lagerkvist	EOS	20 km (12 mi)	MPC · JPL
3251 Eratosthenes	6536 P-L	Eratosthenes	September 24, 1960	Palomar	C. J. van Houten, I. van Houten-Groeneveld, T. Gehrels	·	15 km (9.3 mi)	MPC · JPL
3252 Johnny	1981 EM_{4}	Johnny	March 2, 1981	Siding Spring	S. J. Bus	EUN	7.8 km (4.8 mi)	MPC · JPL
3253 Gradie	1982 HQ_{1}	Gradie	April 28, 1982	Anderson Mesa	E. Bowell	·	6.2 km (3.9 mi)	MPC · JPL
3254 Bus	1982 UM	Bus	October 17, 1982	Anderson Mesa	E. Bowell	3:2	31 km (19 mi)	MPC · JPL
3255 Tholen	1980 RA	Tholen	September 2, 1980	Anderson Mesa	E. Bowell	moon	4.0 km (2.5 mi)	MPC · JPL
3256 Daguerre	1981 SJ_{1}	Daguerre	September 26, 1981	Anderson Mesa	B. A. Skiff, N. G. Thomas	·	21 km (13 mi)	MPC · JPL
3257 Hanzlík	1982 GG	Hanzlík	April 15, 1982	Kleť	A. Mrkos	·	5.6 km (3.5 mi)	MPC · JPL
3258 Somnium	1983 RJ	Somnium	September 8, 1983	Zimmerwald	P. Wild	·	6.3 km (3.9 mi)	MPC · JPL
3259 Brownlee	1984 SZ_{4}	Brownlee	September 25, 1984	Palomar	J. Platt	·	26 km (16 mi)	MPC · JPL
3260 Vizbor	1974 SO_{2}	Vizbor	September 20, 1974	Nauchnij	L. V. Zhuravleva	·	7.7 km (4.8 mi)	MPC · JPL
3261 Tvardovskij	1979 SF_{9}	Tvardovskij	September 22, 1979	Nauchnij	N. S. Chernykh	KOR	12 km (7.5 mi)	MPC · JPL
3262 Miune	1983 WB	Miune	November 28, 1983	Geisei	T. Seki	·	23 km (14 mi)	MPC · JPL
3263 Bligh	1932 CN	Bligh	February 5, 1932	Heidelberg	K. Reinmuth	·	4.9 km (3.0 mi)	MPC · JPL
3264 Bounty	1934 AF	Bounty	January 7, 1934	Heidelberg	K. Reinmuth	THM · fast	16 km (9.9 mi)	MPC · JPL
3265 Fletcher	1953 VN_{2}	Fletcher	November 9, 1953	Heidelberg	K. Reinmuth	V	5.9 km (3.7 mi)	MPC · JPL
3266 Bernardus	1978 PA	Bernardus	August 11, 1978	La Silla	H.-E. Schuster	H	7.6 km (4.7 mi)	MPC · JPL
3267 Glo	1981 AA	Glo	January 3, 1981	Anderson Mesa	E. Bowell	·	6.4 km (4.0 mi)	MPC · JPL
3268 De Sanctis	1981 DD	De Sanctis	February 26, 1981	La Silla	H. Debehogne, G. de Sanctis	V	6.0 km (3.7 mi)	MPC · JPL
3269 Vibert-Douglas	1981 EX_{16}	Vibert-Douglas	March 6, 1981	Siding Spring	S. J. Bus	WAT	12 km (7.5 mi)	MPC · JPL
3270 Dudley	1982 DA	Dudley	February 18, 1982	Palomar	C. S. Shoemaker, S. J. Bus	·	4.9 km (3.0 mi)	MPC · JPL
3271 Ul	1982 RB	Ul	September 14, 1982	La Silla	H.-E. Schuster	AMO +1 km (0.62 mi)	1.7 km (1.1 mi)	MPC · JPL
3272 Tillandz	1938 DB_{1}	Tillandz	February 24, 1938	Turku	Y. Väisälä	·	5.7 km (3.5 mi)	MPC · JPL
3273 Drukar	1975 TS_{2}	Drukar	October 3, 1975	Nauchnij	L. I. Chernykh	CYB · slow	27 km (17 mi)	MPC · JPL
3274 Maillen	1981 QO_{2}	Maillen	August 23, 1981	La Silla	H. Debehogne	THM	15 km (9.3 mi)	MPC · JPL
3275 Oberndorfer	1982 HE_{1}	Oberndorfer	April 25, 1982	Anderson Mesa	E. Bowell	·	11 km (6.8 mi)	MPC · JPL
3276 Porta Coeli	1982 RZ_{1}	Porta Coeli	September 15, 1982	Kleť	A. Mrkos	THM	18 km (11 mi)	MPC · JPL
3277 Aaronson	1984 AF_{1}	Aaronson	January 8, 1984	Anderson Mesa	E. Bowell	·	20 km (12 mi)	MPC · JPL
3278 Běhounek	1984 BT	Běhounek	January 27, 1984	Kleť	A. Mrkos	·	31 km (19 mi)	MPC · JPL
3279 Solon	9103 P-L	Solon	October 17, 1960	Palomar	C. J. van Houten, I. van Houten-Groeneveld, T. Gehrels	·	6.5 km (4.0 mi)	MPC · JPL
3280 Grétry	1933 SJ	Grétry	September 17, 1933	Uccle	F. Rigaux	(5)	8.8 km (5.5 mi)	MPC · JPL
3281 Maupertuis	1938 DZ	Maupertuis	February 24, 1938	Turku	Y. Väisälä	·	5.5 km (3.4 mi)	MPC · JPL
3282 Spencer Jones	1949 DA	Spencer Jones	February 19, 1949	Brooklyn	Indiana University	·	5.2 km (3.2 mi)	MPC · JPL
3283 Skorina	1979 QA_{10}	Skorina	August 27, 1979	Nauchnij	N. S. Chernykh	slow	11 km (6.8 mi)	MPC · JPL
3284 Niebuhr	1953 NB	Niebuhr	July 13, 1953	Johannesburg	Bruwer, J. A.	·	9.1 km (5.7 mi)	MPC · JPL
3285 Ruth Wolfe	1983 VW_{1}	Ruth Wolfe	November 5, 1983	Palomar	C. S. Shoemaker	·	8.6 km (5.3 mi)	MPC · JPL
3286 Anatoliya	1980 BV	Anatoliya	January 23, 1980	Nauchnij	L. G. Karachkina	EUN	8.1 km (5.0 mi)	MPC · JPL
3287 Olmstead	1981 DK_{1}	Olmstead	February 28, 1981	Siding Spring	S. J. Bus	·	5.5 km (3.4 mi)	MPC · JPL
3288 Seleucus	1982 DV	Seleucus	February 28, 1982	La Silla	H.-E. Schuster	AMO +1 km (0.62 mi)	2.8 km (1.7 mi)	MPC · JPL
3289 Mitani	1934 RP	Mitani	September 7, 1934	Heidelberg	K. Reinmuth	·	4.3 km (2.7 mi)	MPC · JPL
3290 Azabu	1973 SZ_{1}	Azabu	September 19, 1973	Palomar	C. J. van Houten, I. van Houten-Groeneveld, T. Gehrels	3:2	10 km (6.2 mi)	MPC · JPL
3291 Dunlap	1982 VX_{3}	Dunlap	November 14, 1982	Kiso	H. Kosai, K. Furukawa	·	22 km (14 mi)	MPC · JPL
3292 Sather	2631 P-L	Sather	September 24, 1960	Palomar	C. J. van Houten, I. van Houten-Groeneveld, T. Gehrels	THM	13 km (8.1 mi)	MPC · JPL
3293 Rontaylor	4650 P-L	Rontaylor	September 24, 1960	Palomar	C. J. van Houten, I. van Houten-Groeneveld, T. Gehrels	NYS	4.5 km (2.8 mi)	MPC · JPL
3294 Carlvesely	6563 P-L	Carlvesely	September 24, 1960	Palomar	C. J. van Houten, I. van Houten-Groeneveld, T. Gehrels	·	11 km (6.8 mi)	MPC · JPL
3295 Murakami	1950 DH	Murakami	February 17, 1950	Heidelberg	K. Reinmuth	·	13 km (8.1 mi)	MPC · JPL
3296 Bosque Alegre	1975 SF	Bosque Alegre	September 30, 1975	El Leoncito	Félix Aguilar Observatory	EUN	10 km (6.2 mi)	MPC · JPL
3297 Hong Kong	1978 WN_{14}	Hong Kong	November 26, 1978	Nanking	Purple Mountain	THM	16 km (9.9 mi)	MPC · JPL
3298 Massandra	1979 OB_{15}	Massandra	July 21, 1979	Nauchnij	N. S. Chernykh	·	11 km (6.8 mi)	MPC · JPL
3299 Hall	1980 TX_{5}	Hall	October 10, 1980	Palomar	C. S. Shoemaker	·	6.1 km (3.8 mi)	MPC · JPL
3300 McGlasson	1928 NA	McGlasson	July 10, 1928	Johannesburg	H. E. Wood	·	23 km (14 mi)	MPC · JPL

== 3301–3400 ==
back to top

Designation			Discovery			Properties		Ref
Permanent	Provisional	Named after	Date	Site	Discoverer(s)	Category	Diam.	Ref
3301 Jansje	1978 CT	Jansje	February 6, 1978	Bickley	Perth Observatory	·	5.4 km (3.4 mi)	MPC · JPL
3302 Schliemann	1977 RS_{6}	Schliemann	September 11, 1977	Nauchnij	N. S. Chernykh	·	7.5 km (4.7 mi)	MPC · JPL
3303 Merta	1967 UN	Merta	October 30, 1967	Hamburg-Bergedorf	L. Kohoutek	KOR	9.9 km (6.2 mi)	MPC · JPL
3304 Pearce	1981 EQ_{21}	Pearce	March 2, 1981	Siding Spring	S. J. Bus	·	9.3 km (5.8 mi)	MPC · JPL
3305 Ceadams	1985 KB	Ceadams	May 21, 1985	Lake Tekapo	A. C. Gilmore, P. M. Kilmartin	EUN	10 km (6.2 mi)	MPC · JPL
3306 Byron	1979 SM_{11}	Byron	September 24, 1979	Nauchnij	N. S. Chernykh	·	7.6 km (4.7 mi)	MPC · JPL
3307 Athabasca	1981 DE_{1}	Athabasca	February 28, 1981	Siding Spring	S. J. Bus	·	3.6 km (2.2 mi)	MPC · JPL
3308 Ferreri	1981 EP	Ferreri	March 1, 1981	La Silla	H. Debehogne, G. de Sanctis	·	12 km (7.5 mi)	MPC · JPL
3309 Brorfelde	1982 BH	Brorfelde	January 28, 1982	Brorfelde	Jensen, K. S.	H · moon	5.0 km (3.1 mi)	MPC · JPL
3310 Patsy	1931 TS_{2}	Patsy	October 9, 1931	Flagstaff	C. W. Tombaugh	EOS	24 km (15 mi)	MPC · JPL
3311 Podobed	1976 QM_{1}	Podobed	August 26, 1976	Nauchnij	N. S. Chernykh	·	17 km (11 mi)	MPC · JPL
3312 Pedersen	1984 SN	Pedersen	September 24, 1984	Brorfelde	Copenhagen Observatory	EOS	17 km (11 mi)	MPC · JPL
3313 Mendel	1980 DG	Mendel	February 19, 1980	Kleť	A. Mrkos	EUN	8.8 km (5.5 mi)	MPC · JPL
3314 Beals	1981 FH	Beals	March 30, 1981	Anderson Mesa	E. Bowell	·	6.8 km (4.2 mi)	MPC · JPL
3315 Chant	1984 CZ	Chant	February 8, 1984	Anderson Mesa	E. Bowell	·	9.5 km (5.9 mi)	MPC · JPL
3316 Herzberg	1984 CN_{1}	Herzberg	February 6, 1984	Anderson Mesa	E. Bowell	·	17 km (11 mi)	MPC · JPL
3317 Paris	1984 KF	Paris	May 26, 1984	Palomar	C. S. Shoemaker, E. M. Shoemaker	L5	119 km (74 mi)	MPC · JPL
3318 Blixen	1985 HB	Blixen	April 23, 1985	Brorfelde	K. Augustesen, P. Jensen	EOS	23 km (14 mi)	MPC · JPL
3319 Kibi	1977 EJ_{5}	Kibi	March 12, 1977	Kiso	H. Kosai, K. Furukawa	HYG	19 km (12 mi)	MPC · JPL
3320 Namba	1982 VZ_{4}	Namba	November 14, 1982	Kiso	H. Kosai, K. Furukawa	·	6.7 km (4.2 mi)	MPC · JPL
3321 Dasha	1975 TZ_{2}	Dasha	October 3, 1975	Nauchnij	L. I. Chernykh	(5) · slow	8.0 km (5.0 mi)	MPC · JPL
3322 Lidiya	1975 XY_{1}	Lidiya	December 1, 1975	Nauchnij	T. M. Smirnova	PHO · slow?	6.4 km (4.0 mi)	MPC · JPL
3323 Turgenev	1979 SY_{9}	Turgenev	September 22, 1979	Nauchnij	N. S. Chernykh	·	4.8 km (3.0 mi)	MPC · JPL
3324 Avsyuk	1983 CW_{1}	Avsyuk	February 4, 1983	Kleť	A. Mrkos	·	19 km (12 mi)	MPC · JPL
3325 TARDIS	1984 JZ	TARDIS	May 3, 1984	Anderson Mesa	B. A. Skiff	·	28 km (17 mi)	MPC · JPL
3326 Agafonikov	1985 FL	Agafonikov	March 20, 1985	Kleť	A. Mrkos	·	14 km (8.7 mi)	MPC · JPL
3327 Campins	1985 PW	Campins	August 14, 1985	Anderson Mesa	E. Bowell	·	21 km (13 mi)	MPC · JPL
3328 Interposita	1985 QD_{1}	Interposita	August 21, 1985	Zimmerwald	Schildknecht, T.	EOS	18 km (11 mi)	MPC · JPL
3329 Golay	1985 RT_{1}	Golay	September 12, 1985	Zimmerwald	P. Wild	EOS	18 km (11 mi)	MPC · JPL
3330 Gantrisch	1985 RU_{1}	Gantrisch	September 12, 1985	Zimmerwald	Schildknecht, T.	LIX	35 km (22 mi)	MPC · JPL
3331 Kvistaberg	1979 QS	Kvistaberg	August 22, 1979	La Silla	C.-I. Lagerkvist	·	8.2 km (5.1 mi)	MPC · JPL
3332 Raksha	1978 NT_{1}	Raksha	July 4, 1978	Nauchnij	L. I. Chernykh	·	15 km (9.3 mi)	MPC · JPL
3333 Schaber	1980 TG_{5}	Schaber	October 9, 1980	Palomar	C. S. Shoemaker	·	27 km (17 mi)	MPC · JPL
3334 Somov	1981 YR	Somov	December 20, 1981	Kleť	A. Mrkos	KOR	10 km (6.2 mi)	MPC · JPL
3335 Quanzhou	1966 AA	Quanzhou	January 1, 1966	Nanking	Purple Mountain	EUN	10 km (6.2 mi)	MPC · JPL
3336 Grygar	1971 UX	Grygar	October 26, 1971	Hamburg-Bergedorf	L. Kohoutek	moon	3.6 km (2.2 mi)	MPC · JPL
3337 Miloš	1971 UG_{1}	Miloš	October 26, 1971	Hamburg-Bergedorf	L. Kohoutek	KOR	10 km (6.2 mi)	MPC · JPL
3338 Richter	1973 UX_{5}	Richter	October 28, 1973	Tautenburg Observatory	F. Börngen	·	3.6 km (2.2 mi)	MPC · JPL
3339 Treshnikov	1978 LB	Treshnikov	June 6, 1978	Kleť	A. Mrkos	·	34 km (21 mi)	MPC · JPL
3340 Yinhai	1979 TK	Yinhai	October 12, 1979	Nanking	Purple Mountain	·	5.9 km (3.7 mi)	MPC · JPL
3341 Hartmann	1980 OD	Hartmann	July 17, 1980	Anderson Mesa	E. Bowell	·	12 km (7.5 mi)	MPC · JPL
3342 Fivesparks	1982 BD_{3}	Fivesparks	January 27, 1982	Harvard Observatory	Oak Ridge Observatory	·	22 km (14 mi)	MPC · JPL
3343 Nedzel	1982 HS	Nedzel	April 28, 1982	Socorro	Lincoln Lab ETS	·	5.2 km (3.2 mi)	MPC · JPL
3344 Modena	1982 JA	Modena	May 15, 1982	Bologna	San Vittore	·	9.7 km (6.0 mi)	MPC · JPL
3345 Tarkovskij	1982 YC_{1}	Tarkovskij	December 23, 1982	Nauchnij	L. G. Karachkina	PHO · slow	22 km (14 mi)	MPC · JPL
3346 Gerla	1951 SD	Gerla	September 27, 1951	Uccle	S. J. Arend	·	35 km (22 mi)	MPC · JPL
3347 Konstantin	1975 VN_{1}	Konstantin	November 2, 1975	Nauchnij	T. M. Smirnova	·	17 km (11 mi)	MPC · JPL
3348 Pokryshkin	1978 EA_{3}	Pokryshkin	March 6, 1978	Nauchnij	N. S. Chernykh	·	16 km (9.9 mi)	MPC · JPL
3349 Manas	1979 FH_{2}	Manas	March 23, 1979	Nauchnij	N. S. Chernykh	AGN	10 km (6.2 mi)	MPC · JPL
3350 Scobee	1980 PJ	Scobee	August 8, 1980	Anderson Mesa	E. Bowell	·	7.4 km (4.6 mi)	MPC · JPL
3351 Smith	1980 RN_{1}	Smith	September 7, 1980	Anderson Mesa	E. Bowell	·	7.3 km (4.5 mi)	MPC · JPL
3352 McAuliffe	1981 CW	McAuliffe	February 6, 1981	Anderson Mesa	N. G. Thomas	AMO +1 km (0.62 mi)	2.3 km (1.4 mi)	MPC · JPL
3353 Jarvis	1981 YC	Jarvis	December 20, 1981	Anderson Mesa	E. Bowell	H · slow	11 km (6.8 mi)	MPC · JPL
3354 McNair	1984 CW	McNair	February 8, 1984	Anderson Mesa	E. Bowell	·	7.7 km (4.8 mi)	MPC · JPL
3355 Onizuka	1984 CC_{1}	Onizuka	February 8, 1984	Anderson Mesa	E. Bowell	(254) · slow	4.7 km (2.9 mi)	MPC · JPL
3356 Resnik	1984 EU	Resnik	March 6, 1984	Anderson Mesa	E. Bowell	slow	4.8 km (3.0 mi)	MPC · JPL
3357 Tolstikov	1984 FT	Tolstikov	March 21, 1984	Kleť	A. Mrkos	EOS	16 km (9.9 mi)	MPC · JPL
3358 Anikushin	1978 RX	Anikushin	September 1, 1978	Nauchnij	N. S. Chernykh	THM	14 km (8.7 mi)	MPC · JPL
3359 Purcari	1978 RA_{6}	Purcari	September 13, 1978	Nauchnij	N. S. Chernykh	·	4.2 km (2.6 mi)	MPC · JPL
3360 Syrinx	1981 VA	Syrinx	November 4, 1981	Palomar	E. F. Helin, R. S. Dunbar	T_{j} (2.96) · APO +1 km (0.62 mi) · (887)	1.8 km (1.1 mi)	MPC · JPL
3361 Orpheus	1982 HR	Orpheus	April 24, 1982	Cerro El Roble	C. Torres	APO · PHA	300 m (980 ft)	MPC · JPL
3362 Khufu	1984 QA	Khufu	August 30, 1984	Palomar	R. S. Dunbar, M. A. Barucci	ATE · PHA	700 m (2,300 ft)	MPC · JPL
3363 Bowen	1960 EE	Bowen	March 6, 1960	Brooklyn	Indiana University	·	9.4 km (5.8 mi)	MPC · JPL
3364 Zdenka	1984 GF	Zdenka	April 5, 1984	Kleť	A. Mrkos	·	5.4 km (3.4 mi)	MPC · JPL
3365 Recogne	1985 CG_{2}	Recogne	February 13, 1985	La Silla	H. Debehogne	·	18 km (11 mi)	MPC · JPL
3366 Gödel	1985 SD_{1}	Gödel	September 22, 1985	Zimmerwald	Schildknecht, T.	EOS	17 km (11 mi)	MPC · JPL
3367 Alex	1983 CA_{3}	Alex	February 15, 1983	Anderson Mesa	N. G. Thomas	·	9.6 km (6.0 mi)	MPC · JPL
3368 Duncombe	1985 QT	Duncombe	August 22, 1985	Anderson Mesa	E. Bowell	CYB	33 km (21 mi)	MPC · JPL
3369 Freuchen	1985 UZ	Freuchen	October 18, 1985	Brorfelde	Copenhagen Observatory	EMA	24 km (15 mi)	MPC · JPL
3370 Kohsai	1934 CU	Kohsai	February 4, 1934	Heidelberg	K. Reinmuth	·	5.4 km (3.4 mi)	MPC · JPL
3371 Giacconi	1955 RZ	Giacconi	September 14, 1955	Brooklyn	Indiana University	·	11 km (6.8 mi)	MPC · JPL
3372 Bratijchuk	1976 SP_{4}	Bratijchuk	September 24, 1976	Nauchnij	N. S. Chernykh	·	21 km (13 mi)	MPC · JPL
3373 Koktebelia	1978 QQ_{2}	Koktebelia	August 31, 1978	Nauchnij	N. S. Chernykh	slow	4.4 km (2.7 mi)	MPC · JPL
3374 Namur	1980 KO	Namur	May 22, 1980	La Silla	H. Debehogne	KOR	7.8 km (4.8 mi)	MPC · JPL
3375 Amy	1981 JY_{1}	Amy	May 5, 1981	Palomar	C. S. Shoemaker	·	6.7 km (4.2 mi)	MPC · JPL
3376 Armandhammer	1982 UJ_{8}	Armandhammer	October 21, 1982	Nauchnij	L. V. Zhuravleva	V	7.9 km (4.9 mi)	MPC · JPL
3377 Lodewijk	4122 P-L	Lodewijk	September 24, 1960	Palomar	C. J. van Houten, I. van Houten-Groeneveld, T. Gehrels	KOR	7.7 km (4.8 mi)	MPC · JPL
3378 Susanvictoria	A922 WB	Susanvictoria	November 25, 1922	Williams Bay	G. Van Biesbroeck	moon	6.6 km (4.1 mi)	MPC · JPL
3379 Oishi	1931 TJ_{1}	Oishi	October 6, 1931	Heidelberg	K. Reinmuth	NYS ·	13 km (8.1 mi)	MPC · JPL
3380 Awaji	1940 EF	Awaji	March 15, 1940	Konkoly	G. Kulin	KOR	10 km (6.2 mi)	MPC · JPL
3381 Mikkola	1941 UG	Mikkola	October 15, 1941	Turku	L. Oterma	·	3.8 km (2.4 mi)	MPC · JPL
3382 Cassidy	1948 RD	Cassidy	September 7, 1948	Flagstaff	H. L. Giclas	·	6.4 km (4.0 mi)	MPC · JPL
3383 Koyama	1951 AB	Koyama	January 9, 1951	Heidelberg	K. Reinmuth	slow	11 km (6.8 mi)	MPC · JPL
3384 Daliya	1974 SB_{1}	Daliya	September 19, 1974	Nauchnij	L. I. Chernykh	NYS	7.0 km (4.3 mi)	MPC · JPL
3385 Bronnina	1979 SK_{11}	Bronnina	September 24, 1979	Nauchnij	N. S. Chernykh	·	7.7 km (4.8 mi)	MPC · JPL
3386 Klementinum	1980 FA	Klementinum	March 16, 1980	Kleť	L. Brožek	KOR	8.6 km (5.3 mi)	MPC · JPL
3387 Greenberg	1981 WE	Greenberg	November 20, 1981	Anderson Mesa	E. Bowell	EUN	8.1 km (5.0 mi)	MPC · JPL
3388 Tsanghinchi	1981 YR_{1}	Tsanghinchi	December 21, 1981	Nanking	Purple Mountain	PHO	6.3 km (3.9 mi)	MPC · JPL
3389 Sinzot	1984 DU	Sinzot	February 25, 1984	La Silla	H. Debehogne	·	21 km (13 mi)	MPC · JPL
3390 Demanet	1984 ES_{1}	Demanet	March 2, 1984	La Silla	H. Debehogne	moon	5.1 km (3.2 mi)	MPC · JPL
3391 Sinon	1977 DD_{3}	Sinon	February 18, 1977	Kiso	H. Kosai, K. Furukawa	L4	38 km (24 mi)	MPC · JPL
3392 Setouchi	1979 YB	Setouchi	December 17, 1979	Kiso	H. Kosai, Sasaki, G.	·	7.1 km (4.4 mi)	MPC · JPL
3393 Štúr	1984 WY_{1}	Štúr	November 28, 1984	Piszkéstető	M. Antal	·	9.6 km (6.0 mi)	MPC · JPL
3394 Banno	1986 DB	Banno	February 16, 1986	Karasuyama	S. Inoda	·	6.3 km (3.9 mi)	MPC · JPL
3395 Jitka	1985 UN	Jitka	October 20, 1985	Kleť	A. Mrkos	AGN	11 km (6.8 mi)	MPC · JPL
3396 Muazzez	A915 TE	Muazzez	October 15, 1915	Heidelberg	M. F. Wolf	CYB	33 km (21 mi)	MPC · JPL
3397 Leyla	1964 XA	Leyla	December 8, 1964	Flagstaff	R. Burnham, N. G. Thomas	PHO	5.3 km (3.3 mi)	MPC · JPL
3398 Stättmayer	1978 PC	Stättmayer	August 10, 1978	La Silla	H.-E. Schuster	PHO	5.7 km (3.5 mi)	MPC · JPL
3399 Kobzon	1979 SZ_{9}	Kobzon	September 22, 1979	Nauchnij	N. S. Chernykh	THM	17 km (11 mi)	MPC · JPL
3400 Aotearoa	1981 GX	Aotearoa	April 2, 1981	Lake Tekapo	A. C. Gilmore, P. M. Kilmartin	H	1.6 km (0.99 mi)	MPC · JPL

== 3401–3500 ==
back to top

Designation			Discovery			Properties		Ref
Permanent	Provisional	Named after	Date	Site	Discoverer(s)	Category	Diam.	Ref
3401 Vanphilos	1981 PA	Vanphilos	August 1, 1981	Harvard Observatory	Harvard Observatory	·	7.0 km (4.3 mi)	MPC · JPL
3402 Wisdom	1981 PB	Wisdom	August 5, 1981	Anderson Mesa	E. Bowell	·	2.1 km (1.3 mi)	MPC · JPL
3403 Tammy	1981 SW	Tammy	September 25, 1981	Socorro	Taff, L. G.	·	4.1 km (2.5 mi)	MPC · JPL
3404 Hinderer	1934 CY	Hinderer	February 4, 1934	Heidelberg	K. Reinmuth	·	8.4 km (5.2 mi)	MPC · JPL
3405 Daiwensai	1964 UQ	Daiwensai	October 30, 1964	Nanking	Purple Mountain	·	25 km (16 mi)	MPC · JPL
3406 Omsk	1969 DA	Omsk	February 21, 1969	Nauchnij	B. A. Burnasheva	·	16 km (9.9 mi)	MPC · JPL
3407 Jimmysimms	1973 DT	Jimmysimms	February 28, 1973	Hamburg-Bergedorf	L. Kohoutek	ADE	16 km (9.9 mi)	MPC · JPL
3408 Shalamov	1977 QG_{4}	Shalamov	August 18, 1977	Nauchnij	N. S. Chernykh	NYS	5.8 km (3.6 mi)	MPC · JPL
3409 Abramov	1977 RE_{6}	Abramov	September 9, 1977	Nauchnij	N. S. Chernykh	KOR	11 km (6.8 mi)	MPC · JPL
3410 Vereshchagin	1978 SZ_{7}	Vereshchagin	September 26, 1978	Nauchnij	L. V. Zhuravleva	·	4.4 km (2.7 mi)	MPC · JPL
3411 Debetencourt	1980 LK	Debetencourt	June 2, 1980	La Silla	H. Debehogne	·	5.5 km (3.4 mi)	MPC · JPL
3412 Kafka	1983 AU_{2}	Kafka	January 10, 1983	Palomar	Kirk, R., Rudy, D.	slow	6.1 km (3.8 mi)	MPC · JPL
3413 Andriana	1983 CB_{3}	Andriana	February 15, 1983	Anderson Mesa	N. G. Thomas	·	5.5 km (3.4 mi)	MPC · JPL
3414 Champollion	1983 DJ	Champollion	February 19, 1983	Anderson Mesa	E. Bowell	·	5.2 km (3.2 mi)	MPC · JPL
3415 Danby	1928 SL	Danby	September 22, 1928	Heidelberg	K. Reinmuth	3:2	37 km (23 mi)	MPC · JPL
3416 Dorrit	1931 VP	Dorrit	November 8, 1931	Heidelberg	K. Reinmuth	H	4.3 km (2.7 mi)	MPC · JPL
3417 Tamblyn	1937 GG	Tamblyn	April 1, 1937	Heidelberg	K. Reinmuth	·	4.6 km (2.9 mi)	MPC · JPL
3418 Izvekov	1973 QZ_{1}	Izvekov	August 31, 1973	Nauchnij	T. M. Smirnova	THM	19 km (12 mi)	MPC · JPL
3419 Guth	1981 JZ	Guth	May 8, 1981	Kleť	L. Brožek	URS	35 km (22 mi)	MPC · JPL
3420 Standish	1984 EB	Standish	March 1, 1984	Anderson Mesa	E. Bowell	·	19 km (12 mi)	MPC · JPL
3421 Yangchenning	1975 WK_{1}	Yangchenning	November 26, 1975	Nanking	Purple Mountain	·	4.0 km (2.5 mi)	MPC · JPL
3422 Reid	1978 OJ	Reid	July 28, 1978	Bickley	Perth Observatory	EUN	10 km (6.2 mi)	MPC · JPL
3423 Slouka	1981 CK	Slouka	February 9, 1981	Kleť	L. Brožek	·	20 km (12 mi)	MPC · JPL
3424 Nušl	1982 CD	Nušl	February 14, 1982	Kleť	L. Brožek	·	6.8 km (4.2 mi)	MPC · JPL
3425 Hurukawa	1929 BD	Hurukawa	January 29, 1929	Heidelberg	K. Reinmuth	EOS	21 km (13 mi)	MPC · JPL
3426 Seki	1932 CQ	Seki	February 5, 1932	Heidelberg	K. Reinmuth	·	16 km (9.9 mi)	MPC · JPL
3427 Szentmártoni	1938 AD	Szentmártoni	January 6, 1938	Konkoly	G. Kulin	·	5.0 km (3.1 mi)	MPC · JPL
3428 Roberts	1952 JH	Roberts	May 1, 1952	Brooklyn	Indiana University	·	17 km (11 mi)	MPC · JPL
3429 Chuvaev	1974 SU_{1}	Chuvaev	September 19, 1974	Nauchnij	L. I. Chernykh	·	8.9 km (5.5 mi)	MPC · JPL
3430 Bradfield	1980 TF_{4}	Bradfield	October 9, 1980	Palomar	C. S. Shoemaker	AGN	8.5 km (5.3 mi)	MPC · JPL
3431 Nakano	1984 QC	Nakano	August 24, 1984	Geisei	T. Seki	·	44 km (27 mi)	MPC · JPL
3432 Kobuchizawa	1986 EE	Kobuchizawa	March 7, 1986	Kobuchizawa	Inoue, M., O. Muramatsu, T. Urata	·	17 km (11 mi)	MPC · JPL
3433 Fehrenbach	1963 TJ_{1}	Fehrenbach	October 15, 1963	Brooklyn	Indiana University	moon	7.7 km (4.8 mi)	MPC · JPL
3434 Hurless	1981 VO	Hurless	November 2, 1981	Anderson Mesa	B. A. Skiff	·	14 km (8.7 mi)	MPC · JPL
3435 Boury	1981 XC_{2}	Boury	December 2, 1981	Haute-Provence	F. Dossin	·	7.3 km (4.5 mi)	MPC · JPL
3436 Ibadinov	1976 SS_{3}	Ibadinov	September 24, 1976	Nauchnij	N. S. Chernykh	KOR · slow?	8.0 km (5.0 mi)	MPC · JPL
3437 Kapitsa	1982 UZ_{5}	Kapitsa	October 20, 1982	Nauchnij	L. G. Karachkina	·	5.8 km (3.6 mi)	MPC · JPL
3438 Inarradas	1974 SD_{5}	Inarradas	September 21, 1974	El Leoncito	Félix Aguilar Observatory	INA	25 km (16 mi)	MPC · JPL
3439 Lebofsky	1983 RL_{2}	Lebofsky	September 4, 1983	Anderson Mesa	E. Bowell	MRX	8.8 km (5.5 mi)	MPC · JPL
3440 Stampfer	1950 DD	Stampfer	February 17, 1950	Heidelberg	K. Reinmuth	·	11 km (6.8 mi)	MPC · JPL
3441 Pochaina	1969 TS_{1}	Pochaina	October 8, 1969	Nauchnij	L. I. Chernykh	THM	18 km (11 mi)	MPC · JPL
3442 Yashin	1978 TO_{7}	Yashin	October 2, 1978	Nauchnij	L. V. Zhuravleva	·	26 km (16 mi)	MPC · JPL
3443 Leetsungdao	1979 SB_{1}	Leetsungdao	September 26, 1979	Nanking	Purple Mountain	·	8.9 km (5.5 mi)	MPC · JPL
3444 Stepanian	1980 RJ_{2}	Stepanian	September 7, 1980	Nauchnij	N. S. Chernykh	·	6.4 km (4.0 mi)	MPC · JPL
3445 Pinson	1983 FC	Pinson	March 16, 1983	Anderson Mesa	E. Barr	ADE	20 km (12 mi)	MPC · JPL
3446 Combes	1942 EB	Combes	March 12, 1942	Heidelberg	K. Reinmuth	·	8.4 km (5.2 mi)	MPC · JPL
3447 Burckhalter	1956 SC	Burckhalter	September 29, 1956	Brooklyn	Indiana University	H	6.0 km (3.7 mi)	MPC · JPL
3448 Narbut	1977 QA_{5}	Narbut	August 22, 1977	Nauchnij	N. S. Chernykh	·	6.0 km (3.7 mi)	MPC · JPL
3449 Abell	1978 VR_{9}	Abell	November 7, 1978	Palomar	E. F. Helin, S. J. Bus	THM	16 km (9.9 mi)	MPC · JPL
3450 Dommanget	1983 QJ	Dommanget	August 31, 1983	La Silla	H. Debehogne	PAD	17 km (11 mi)	MPC · JPL
3451 Mentor	1984 HA_{1}	Mentor	April 19, 1984	Kleť	A. Mrkos	L5	126 km (78 mi)	MPC · JPL
3452 Hawke	1980 OA	Hawke	July 17, 1980	Anderson Mesa	E. Bowell	·	3.5 km (2.2 mi)	MPC · JPL
3453 Dostoevsky	1981 SS_{5}	Dostoevsky	September 27, 1981	Nauchnij	L. G. Karachkina	·	5.7 km (3.5 mi)	MPC · JPL
3454 Lieske	1981 WB_{1}	Lieske	November 24, 1981	Anderson Mesa	E. Bowell	slow	5.6 km (3.5 mi)	MPC · JPL
3455 Kristensen	1985 QC	Kristensen	August 20, 1985	Anderson Mesa	E. Bowell	·	5.9 km (3.7 mi)	MPC · JPL
3456 Etiennemarey	1985 RS_{2}	Etiennemarey	September 5, 1985	La Silla	H. Debehogne	·	4.3 km (2.7 mi)	MPC · JPL
3457 Arnenordheim	1985 RA_{3}	Arnenordheim	September 5, 1985	La Silla	H. Debehogne	KOR	13 km (8.1 mi)	MPC · JPL
3458 Boduognat	1985 RT_{3}	Boduognat	September 7, 1985	La Silla	H. Debehogne	·	7.4 km (4.6 mi)	MPC · JPL
3459 Bodil	1986 GB	Bodil	April 2, 1986	Brorfelde	P. Jensen	slow	7.9 km (4.9 mi)	MPC · JPL
3460 Ashkova	1973 QB_{2}	Ashkova	August 31, 1973	Nauchnij	T. M. Smirnova	(3460)	18 km (11 mi)	MPC · JPL
3461 Mandelshtam	1977 SA_{1}	Mandelshtam	September 18, 1977	Nauchnij	N. S. Chernykh	·	7.6 km (4.7 mi)	MPC · JPL
3462 Zhouguangzhao	1981 UA_{10}	Zhouguangzhao	October 25, 1981	Nanking	Purple Mountain	·	7.8 km (4.8 mi)	MPC · JPL
3463 Kaokuen	1981 XJ_{2}	Kaokuen	December 3, 1981	Nanking	Purple Mountain	NYS	14 km (8.7 mi)	MPC · JPL
3464 Owensby	1983 BA	Owensby	January 16, 1983	Anderson Mesa	E. Bowell	·	4.4 km (2.7 mi)	MPC · JPL
3465 Trevires	1984 SQ_{5}	Trevires	September 20, 1984	La Silla	H. Debehogne	slow	5.9 km (3.7 mi)	MPC · JPL
3466 Ritina	1975 EA_{6}	Ritina	March 6, 1975	Nauchnij	N. S. Chernykh	·	5.8 km (3.6 mi)	MPC · JPL
3467 Bernheim	1981 SF_{2}	Bernheim	September 26, 1981	Anderson Mesa	N. G. Thomas	NYS	12 km (7.5 mi)	MPC · JPL
3468 Urgenta	1975 AM	Urgenta	January 7, 1975	Zimmerwald	P. Wild	EOS	14 km (8.7 mi)	MPC · JPL
3469 Bulgakov	1982 UL_{7}	Bulgakov	October 21, 1982	Nauchnij	L. G. Karachkina	EOS	19 km (12 mi)	MPC · JPL
3470 Yaronika	1975 ES	Yaronika	March 6, 1975	Nauchnij	N. S. Chernykh	·	13 km (8.1 mi)	MPC · JPL
3471 Amelin	1977 QK_{2}	Amelin	August 21, 1977	Nauchnij	N. S. Chernykh	URS	29 km (18 mi)	MPC · JPL
3472 Upgren	1981 EJ_{10}	Upgren	March 1, 1981	Siding Spring	S. J. Bus	·	11 km (6.8 mi)	MPC · JPL
3473 Sapporo	A924 EG	Sapporo	March 7, 1924	Heidelberg	K. Reinmuth	·	4.8 km (3.0 mi)	MPC · JPL
3474 Linsley	1962 HE	Linsley	April 27, 1962	Brooklyn	Indiana University	·	8.1 km (5.0 mi)	MPC · JPL
3475 Fichte	1972 TD	Fichte	October 4, 1972	Hamburg-Bergedorf	L. Kohoutek	·	30 km (19 mi)	MPC · JPL
3476 Dongguan	1978 UF_{2}	Dongguan	October 28, 1978	Nanking	Purple Mountain	·	32 km (20 mi)	MPC · JPL
3477 Kazbegi	1979 KH	Kazbegi	May 19, 1979	La Silla	R. M. West	V	6.2 km (3.9 mi)	MPC · JPL
3478 Fanale	1979 XG	Fanale	December 14, 1979	Anderson Mesa	E. Bowell	·	7.0 km (4.3 mi)	MPC · JPL
3479 Malaparte	1980 TQ	Malaparte	October 3, 1980	Kleť	Z. Vávrová	·	19 km (12 mi)	MPC · JPL
3480 Abante	1981 GB	Abante	April 1, 1981	Anderson Mesa	E. Bowell	·	9.5 km (5.9 mi)	MPC · JPL
3481 Xianglupeak	1982 DS_{6}	Xianglupeak	February 19, 1982	Xinglong	Peking Observatory	·	6.0 km (3.7 mi)	MPC · JPL
3482 Lesnaya	1975 VY_{4}	Lesnaya	November 2, 1975	Nauchnij	T. M. Smirnova	·	13 km (8.1 mi)	MPC · JPL
3483 Svetlov	1976 YP_{2}	Svetlov	December 16, 1976	Nauchnij	L. I. Chernykh	H	2.9 km (1.8 mi)	MPC · JPL
3484 Neugebauer	1978 NE	Neugebauer	July 10, 1978	Palomar	E. F. Helin, E. M. Shoemaker	EUN	6.9 km (4.3 mi)	MPC · JPL
3485 Barucci	1983 NU	Barucci	July 11, 1983	Anderson Mesa	E. Bowell	NYS ·	15 km (9.3 mi)	MPC · JPL
3486 Fulchignoni	1984 CR	Fulchignoni	February 5, 1984	Anderson Mesa	E. Bowell	NYS ·	5.8 km (3.6 mi)	MPC · JPL
3487 Edgeworth	1978 UF	Edgeworth	October 28, 1978	Anderson Mesa	H. L. Giclas	EUN	8.3 km (5.2 mi)	MPC · JPL
3488 Brahic	1980 PM	Brahic	August 8, 1980	Anderson Mesa	E. Bowell	EUN	5.3 km (3.3 mi)	MPC · JPL
3489 Lottie	1983 AT_{2}	Lottie	January 10, 1983	Palomar	K. Herkenhoff, G. Ojakangas	V	4.4 km (2.7 mi)	MPC · JPL
3490 Šolc	1984 SV	Šolc	September 20, 1984	Kleť	A. Mrkos	V	5.0 km (3.1 mi)	MPC · JPL
3491 Fridolin	1984 SM_{4}	Fridolin	September 30, 1984	Zimmerwald	P. Wild	AGN	8.0 km (5.0 mi)	MPC · JPL
3492 Petra-Pepi	1985 DQ	Petra-Pepi	February 16, 1985	Kleť	Mahrová, M.	EUN	12 km (7.5 mi)	MPC · JPL
3493 Stepanov	1976 GR_{6}	Stepanov	April 3, 1976	Nauchnij	N. S. Chernykh	·	6.3 km (3.9 mi)	MPC · JPL
3494 Purple Mountain	1980 XW	Purple Mountain	December 7, 1980	Nanking	Purple Mountain	V	6.5 km (4.0 mi)	MPC · JPL
3495 Colchagua	1981 NU	Colchagua	July 2, 1981	Cerro El Roble	Gonzalez, L. E.	THM	26 km (16 mi)	MPC · JPL
3496 Arieso	1977 RC	Arieso	September 5, 1977	La Silla	H.-E. Schuster	·	4.1 km (2.5 mi)	MPC · JPL
3497 Innanen	1941 HJ	Innanen	April 19, 1941	Turku	L. Oterma	·	18 km (11 mi)	MPC · JPL
3498 Belton	1981 EG_{14}	Belton	March 1, 1981	Siding Spring	S. J. Bus	V	3.3 km (2.1 mi)	MPC · JPL
3499 Hoppe	1981 VW_{1}	Hoppe	November 3, 1981	Tautenburg Observatory	F. Börngen, Kirsch, K.	THM	16 km (9.9 mi)	MPC · JPL
3500 Kobayashi	A919 SD	Kobayashi	September 18, 1919	Heidelberg	K. Reinmuth	·	7.4 km (4.6 mi)	MPC · JPL

== 3501–3600 ==
back to top

Designation			Discovery			Properties		Ref
Permanent	Provisional	Named after	Date	Site	Discoverer(s)	Category	Diam.	Ref
3501 Olegiya	1971 QU	Olegiya	August 18, 1971	Nauchnij	T. M. Smirnova	·	22 km (14 mi)	MPC · JPL
3502 Huangpu	1964 TR_{1}	Huangpu	October 9, 1964	Nanking	Purple Mountain	THM	22 km (14 mi)	MPC · JPL
3503 Brandt	1981 EF_{17}	Brandt	March 1, 1981	Siding Spring	S. J. Bus	EUN	5.2 km (3.2 mi)	MPC · JPL
3504 Kholshevnikov	1981 RV_{3}	Kholshevnikov	September 3, 1981	Nauchnij	N. S. Chernykh	THM	19 km (12 mi)	MPC · JPL
3505 Byrd	1983 AM	Byrd	January 9, 1983	Anderson Mesa	B. A. Skiff	EOS	15 km (9.3 mi)	MPC · JPL
3506 French	1984 CO_{1}	French	February 6, 1984	Anderson Mesa	E. Bowell	EOS	16 km (9.9 mi)	MPC · JPL
3507 Vilas	1982 UX	Vilas	October 21, 1982	Anderson Mesa	E. Bowell	THM	25 km (16 mi)	MPC · JPL
3508 Pasternak	1980 DO_{5}	Pasternak	February 21, 1980	Nauchnij	L. G. Karachkina	·	10 km (6.2 mi)	MPC · JPL
3509 Sanshui	1978 UH_{2}	Sanshui	October 28, 1978	Nanking	Purple Mountain	·	9.3 km (5.8 mi)	MPC · JPL
3510 Veeder	1982 TP	Veeder	October 13, 1982	Anderson Mesa	E. Bowell	·	8.0 km (5.0 mi)	MPC · JPL
3511 Tsvetaeva	1982 TC_{2}	Tsvetaeva	October 14, 1982	Nauchnij	L. V. Zhuravleva, L. G. Karachkina	·	9.6 km (6.0 mi)	MPC · JPL
3512 Eriepa	1984 AC_{1}	Eriepa	January 8, 1984	Anderson Mesa	Wagner, J.	·	4.9 km (3.0 mi)	MPC · JPL
3513 Quqinyue	1965 UZ	Quqinyue	October 16, 1965	Nanking	Purple Mountain	·	12 km (7.5 mi)	MPC · JPL
3514 Hooke	1971 UJ	Hooke	October 26, 1971	Hamburg-Bergedorf	L. Kohoutek	3:2	22 km (14 mi)	MPC · JPL
3515 Jindra	1982 UH_{2}	Jindra	October 16, 1982	Kleť	Z. Vávrová	KOR	7.7 km (4.8 mi)	MPC · JPL
3516 Rusheva	1982 UH_{7}	Rusheva	October 21, 1982	Nauchnij	L. G. Karachkina	KOR	11 km (6.8 mi)	MPC · JPL
3517 Tatianicheva	1976 SE_{1}	Tatianicheva	September 24, 1976	Nauchnij	N. S. Chernykh	·	5.1 km (3.2 mi)	MPC · JPL
3518 Florena	1977 QC_{4}	Florena	August 18, 1977	Nauchnij	N. S. Chernykh	EUN	8.6 km (5.3 mi)	MPC · JPL
3519 Ambiorix	1984 DO	Ambiorix	February 23, 1984	La Silla	H. Debehogne	·	5.9 km (3.7 mi)	MPC · JPL
3520 Klopsteg	1952 SG	Klopsteg	September 16, 1952	Brooklyn	Indiana University	·	6.8 km (4.2 mi)	MPC · JPL
3521 Comrie	1982 MH	Comrie	June 26, 1982	Lake Tekapo	A. C. Gilmore, P. M. Kilmartin	·	3.9 km (2.4 mi)	MPC · JPL
3522 Becker	1941 SW	Becker	September 21, 1941	Turku	Y. Väisälä	·	20 km (12 mi)	MPC · JPL
3523 Arina	1975 TV_{2}	Arina	October 3, 1975	Nauchnij	L. I. Chernykh	moon	9.1 km (5.7 mi)	MPC · JPL
3524 Schulz	1981 EE_{27}	Schulz	March 2, 1981	Siding Spring	S. J. Bus	EUN	6.5 km (4.0 mi)	MPC · JPL
3525 Paul	1983 CX_{2}	Paul	February 15, 1983	Anderson Mesa	N. G. Thomas	·	19 km (12 mi)	MPC · JPL
3526 Jeffbell	1984 CN	Jeffbell	February 5, 1984	Anderson Mesa	E. Bowell	·	22 km (14 mi)	MPC · JPL
3527 McCord	1985 GE_{1}	McCord	April 15, 1985	Anderson Mesa	E. Bowell	slow	7.2 km (4.5 mi)	MPC · JPL
3528 Counselman	1981 EW_{3}	Counselman	March 2, 1981	Siding Spring	S. J. Bus	·	6.8 km (4.2 mi)	MPC · JPL
3529 Dowling	1981 EQ_{19}	Dowling	March 2, 1981	Siding Spring	S. J. Bus	·	6.1 km (3.8 mi)	MPC · JPL
3530 Hammel	1981 EC_{20}	Hammel	March 2, 1981	Siding Spring	S. J. Bus	NYS	5.3 km (3.3 mi)	MPC · JPL
3531 Cruikshank	1981 FB	Cruikshank	March 30, 1981	Anderson Mesa	E. Bowell	slow	8.3 km (5.2 mi)	MPC · JPL
3532 Tracie	1983 AS_{2}	Tracie	January 10, 1983	Palomar	K. Herkenhoff, G. Ojakangas	·	16 km (9.9 mi)	MPC · JPL
3533 Toyota	1986 UE	Toyota	October 30, 1986	Toyota	K. Suzuki, T. Urata	(883)	7.3 km (4.5 mi)	MPC · JPL
3534 Sax	1936 XA	Sax	December 15, 1936	Uccle	E. Delporte	·	9.0 km (5.6 mi)	MPC · JPL
3535 Ditte	1979 SN_{11}	Ditte	September 24, 1979	Nauchnij	N. S. Chernykh	·	7.1 km (4.4 mi)	MPC · JPL
3536 Schleicher	1981 EV_{20}	Schleicher	March 2, 1981	Siding Spring	S. J. Bus	·	3.1 km (1.9 mi)	MPC · JPL
3537 Jürgen	1982 VT	Jürgen	November 15, 1982	Anderson Mesa	E. Bowell	MAR	8.3 km (5.2 mi)	MPC · JPL
3538 Nelsonia	6548 P-L	Nelsonia	September 24, 1960	Palomar	C. J. van Houten, I. van Houten-Groeneveld, T. Gehrels	·	11 km (6.8 mi)	MPC · JPL
3539 Weimar	1967 GF_{1}	Weimar	April 11, 1967	Tautenburg Observatory	F. Börngen	EUN	7.8 km (4.8 mi)	MPC · JPL
3540 Protesilaos	1973 UF_{5}	Protesilaos	October 27, 1973	Tautenburg Observatory	F. Börngen	L4	70 km (43 mi)	MPC · JPL
3541 Graham	1984 ML	Graham	June 18, 1984	Bickley	Perth Observatory	·	14 km (8.7 mi)	MPC · JPL
3542 Tanjiazhen	1964 TN_{2}	Tanjiazhen	October 9, 1964	Nanking	Purple Mountain	VER ·	18 km (11 mi)	MPC · JPL
3543 Ningbo	1964 VA_{3}	Ningbo	November 11, 1964	Nanking	Purple Mountain	THM	22 km (14 mi)	MPC · JPL
3544 Borodino	1977 RD_{4}	Borodino	September 7, 1977	Nauchnij	N. S. Chernykh	·	8.5 km (5.3 mi)	MPC · JPL
3545 Gaffey	1981 WK_{2}	Gaffey	November 20, 1981	Anderson Mesa	E. Bowell	KOR	12 km (7.5 mi)	MPC · JPL
3546 Atanasoff	1983 SC	Atanasoff	September 28, 1983	Smolyan	Bulgarian National Observatory	·	10 km (6.2 mi)	MPC · JPL
3547 Serov	1978 TM_{6}	Serov	October 2, 1978	Nauchnij	L. V. Zhuravleva	·	8.3 km (5.2 mi)	MPC · JPL
3548 Eurybates	1973 SO	Eurybates	September 19, 1973	Palomar	C. J. van Houten, I. van Houten-Groeneveld, T. Gehrels	L4 · ERY · moon	64 km (40 mi)	MPC · JPL
3549 Hapke	1981 YH	Hapke	December 30, 1981	Anderson Mesa	E. Bowell	·	9.1 km (5.7 mi)	MPC · JPL
3550 Link	1981 YS	Link	December 20, 1981	Kleť	A. Mrkos	·	27 km (17 mi)	MPC · JPL
3551 Verenia	1983 RD	Verenia	September 12, 1983	Palomar	R. S. Dunbar	AMO +1 km (0.62 mi)	900 m (3,000 ft)	MPC · JPL
3552 Don Quixote	1983 SA	Don Quixote	September 26, 1983	Zimmerwald	P. Wild	T_{j} (2.32) · AMO +1 km (0.62 mi)	19 km (12 mi)	MPC · JPL
3553 Mera	1985 JA	Mera	May 14, 1985	Palomar	C. S. Shoemaker	AMO +1 km (0.62 mi)	1.9 km (1.2 mi)	MPC · JPL
3554 Amun	1986 EB	Amun	March 4, 1986	Palomar	C. S. Shoemaker, E. M. Shoemaker	ATE +1 km (0.62 mi)	3.3 km (2.1 mi)	MPC · JPL
3555 Miyasaka	1931 TC_{1}	Miyasaka	October 6, 1931	Heidelberg	K. Reinmuth	·	6.5 km (4.0 mi)	MPC · JPL
3556 Lixiaohua	1964 UO	Lixiaohua	October 30, 1964	Nanking	Purple Mountain	LIX	20 km (12 mi)	MPC · JPL
3557 Sokolsky	1977 QE_{1}	Sokolsky	August 19, 1977	Nauchnij	N. S. Chernykh	3:2	40 km (25 mi)	MPC · JPL
3558 Shishkin	1978 SQ_{2}	Shishkin	September 26, 1978	Nauchnij	L. V. Zhuravleva	PHO	8.8 km (5.5 mi)	MPC · JPL
3559 Violaumayer	1980 PH	Violaumayer	August 8, 1980	Anderson Mesa	E. Bowell	·	10 km (6.2 mi)	MPC · JPL
3560 Chenqian	1980 RZ_{2}	Chenqian	September 3, 1980	Nanking	Purple Mountain	EOS	22 km (14 mi)	MPC · JPL
3561 Devine	1983 HO	Devine	April 18, 1983	Anderson Mesa	N. G. Thomas	HIL · 3:2 · (3561)	33 km (21 mi)	MPC · JPL
3562 Ignatius	1984 AZ	Ignatius	January 8, 1984	Anderson Mesa	Wagner, J.	·	7.7 km (4.8 mi)	MPC · JPL
3563 Canterbury	1985 FE	Canterbury	March 23, 1985	Lake Tekapo	A. C. Gilmore, P. M. Kilmartin	DOR	17 km (11 mi)	MPC · JPL
3564 Talthybius	1985 TC_{1}	Talthybius	October 15, 1985	Anderson Mesa	E. Bowell	L4	74 km (46 mi)	MPC · JPL
3565 Ojima	1986 YD	Ojima	December 22, 1986	Ojima	T. Niijima, T. Urata	·	28 km (17 mi)	MPC · JPL
3566 Levitan	1979 YA_{9}	Levitan	December 24, 1979	Nauchnij	L. V. Zhuravleva	·	15 km (9.3 mi)	MPC · JPL
3567 Alvema	1930 VD	Alvema	November 15, 1930	Uccle	E. Delporte	·	15 km (9.3 mi)	MPC · JPL
3568 ASCII	1936 UB	ASCII	October 17, 1936	Nice	M. Laugier	·	24 km (15 mi)	MPC · JPL
3569 Kumon	1938 DN_{1}	Kumon	February 20, 1938	Heidelberg	K. Reinmuth	EUN	7.7 km (4.8 mi)	MPC · JPL
3570 Wuyeesun	1979 XO	Wuyeesun	December 14, 1979	Nanking	Purple Mountain	EOS	20 km (12 mi)	MPC · JPL
3571 Milanštefánik	1982 EJ	Milanštefánik	March 15, 1982	Kleť	A. Mrkos	HIL · 3:2 · slow	35 km (22 mi)	MPC · JPL
3572 Leogoldberg	1954 UJ_{2}	Leogoldberg	October 28, 1954	Brooklyn	Indiana University	·	9.2 km (5.7 mi)	MPC · JPL
3573 Holmberg	1982 QO_{1}	Holmberg	August 16, 1982	La Silla	C.-I. Lagerkvist	·	6.2 km (3.9 mi)	MPC · JPL
3574 Rudaux	1982 TQ	Rudaux	October 13, 1982	Anderson Mesa	E. Bowell	·	5.1 km (3.2 mi)	MPC · JPL
3575 Anyuta	1984 DU_{2}	Anyuta	February 26, 1984	Nauchnij	N. S. Chernykh	·	12 km (7.5 mi)	MPC · JPL
3576 Galina	1984 DB_{3}	Galina	February 26, 1984	Nauchnij	N. S. Chernykh	·	7.4 km (4.6 mi)	MPC · JPL
3577 Putilin	1969 TK	Putilin	October 7, 1969	Nauchnij	L. I. Chernykh	3:2	49 km (30 mi)	MPC · JPL
3578 Carestia	1977 CC	Carestia	February 11, 1977	El Leoncito	Félix Aguilar Observatory	·	43 km (27 mi)	MPC · JPL
3579 Rockholt	1977 YA	Rockholt	December 18, 1977	Piszkéstető	M. Lovas	·	6.9 km (4.3 mi)	MPC · JPL
3580 Avery	1983 CS_{2}	Avery	February 15, 1983	Anderson Mesa	N. G. Thomas	·	8.5 km (5.3 mi)	MPC · JPL
3581 Alvarez	1985 HC	Alvarez	April 23, 1985	Palomar	C. S. Shoemaker	·	20 km (12 mi)	MPC · JPL
3582 Cyrano	1986 TT_{5}	Cyrano	October 2, 1986	Zimmerwald	P. Wild	EOS	16 km (9.9 mi)	MPC · JPL
3583 Burdett	1929 TQ	Burdett	October 5, 1929	Flagstaff	C. W. Tombaugh	NYS	6.6 km (4.1 mi)	MPC · JPL
3584 Aisha	1981 TW	Aisha	October 5, 1981	Anderson Mesa	N. G. Thomas	·	28 km (17 mi)	MPC · JPL
3585 Goshirakawa	1987 BE	Goshirakawa	January 28, 1987	Ojima	T. Niijima, T. Urata	·	15 km (9.3 mi)	MPC · JPL
3586 Vasnetsov	1978 SW_{6}	Vasnetsov	September 26, 1978	Nauchnij	L. V. Zhuravleva	·	7.2 km (4.5 mi)	MPC · JPL
3587 Descartes	1981 RK_{5}	Descartes	September 8, 1981	Nauchnij	L. V. Zhuravleva	·	15 km (9.3 mi)	MPC · JPL
3588 Kirik	1981 TH_{4}	Kirik	October 8, 1981	Nauchnij	L. I. Chernykh	·	20 km (12 mi)	MPC · JPL
3589 Loyola	1984 AB_{1}	Loyola	January 8, 1984	Anderson Mesa	Wagner, J.	·	4.3 km (2.7 mi)	MPC · JPL
3590 Holst	1984 CQ	Holst	February 5, 1984	Anderson Mesa	E. Bowell	·	5.3 km (3.3 mi)	MPC · JPL
3591 Vladimirskij	1978 QJ_{2}	Vladimirskij	August 31, 1978	Nauchnij	N. S. Chernykh	THM	16 km (9.9 mi)	MPC · JPL
3592 Nedbal	1980 CT	Nedbal	February 15, 1980	Kleť	Z. Vávrová	·	5.4 km (3.4 mi)	MPC · JPL
3593 Osip	1981 EB_{20}	Osip	March 2, 1981	Siding Spring	S. J. Bus	·	5.0 km (3.1 mi)	MPC · JPL
3594 Scotti	1983 CN	Scotti	February 11, 1983	Anderson Mesa	E. Bowell	MAR	7.1 km (4.4 mi)	MPC · JPL
3595 Gallagher	1985 TF_{1}	Gallagher	October 15, 1985	Anderson Mesa	E. Bowell	·	7.7 km (4.8 mi)	MPC · JPL
3596 Meriones	1985 VO	Meriones	November 14, 1985	Brorfelde	P. Jensen, K. Augustesen	L4	87 km (54 mi)	MPC · JPL
3597 Kakkuri	1941 UL	Kakkuri	October 15, 1941	Turku	L. Oterma	THM ·	18 km (11 mi)	MPC · JPL
3598 Saucier	1977 KK_{1}	Saucier	May 18, 1977	Palomar	Howell Bus, E.	·	19 km (12 mi)	MPC · JPL
3599 Basov	1978 PB_{3}	Basov	August 8, 1978	Nauchnij	N. S. Chernykh	THM · fast	18 km (11 mi)	MPC · JPL
3600 Archimedes	1978 SL_{7}	Archimedes	September 26, 1978	Nauchnij	L. V. Zhuravleva	RAF	6.8 km (4.2 mi)	MPC · JPL

== 3601–3700 ==
back to top

Designation			Discovery			Properties		Ref
Permanent	Provisional	Named after	Date	Site	Discoverer(s)	Category	Diam.	Ref
3601 Velikhov	1979 SP_{9}	Velikhov	September 22, 1979	Nauchnij	N. S. Chernykh	THM	13 km (8.1 mi)	MPC · JPL
3602 Lazzaro	1981 DQ_{2}	Lazzaro	February 28, 1981	Siding Spring	S. J. Bus	·	4.1 km (2.5 mi)	MPC · JPL
3603 Gajdušek	1981 RM	Gajdušek	September 5, 1981	Kleť	L. Brožek	·	7.6 km (4.7 mi)	MPC · JPL
3604 Berkhuijsen	5550 P-L	Berkhuijsen	October 17, 1960	Palomar	C. J. van Houten, I. van Houten-Groeneveld, T. Gehrels	ADE	13 km (8.1 mi)	MPC · JPL
3605 Davy	1932 WB	Davy	November 28, 1932	Uccle	E. Delporte	·	6.0 km (3.7 mi)	MPC · JPL
3606 Pohjola	1939 SF	Pohjola	September 19, 1939	Turku	Y. Väisälä	·	8.9 km (5.5 mi)	MPC · JPL
3607 Naniwa	1977 DO_{4}	Naniwa	February 18, 1977	Kiso	H. Kosai, K. Furukawa	·	4.0 km (2.5 mi)	MPC · JPL
3608 Kataev	1978 SD_{1}	Kataev	September 27, 1978	Nauchnij	L. I. Chernykh	CYB	30 km (19 mi)	MPC · JPL
3609 Liloketai	1980 VM_{1}	Liloketai	November 13, 1980	Nanking	Purple Mountain	·	18 km (11 mi)	MPC · JPL
3610 Decampos	1981 EA_{1}	Decampos	March 5, 1981	La Silla	H. Debehogne, G. de Sanctis	·	4.6 km (2.9 mi)	MPC · JPL
3611 Dabu	1981 YY_{1}	Dabu	December 20, 1981	Nanking	Purple Mountain	DOR	14 km (8.7 mi)	MPC · JPL
3612 Peale	1982 TW	Peale	October 13, 1982	Anderson Mesa	E. Bowell	NYS ·	11 km (6.8 mi)	MPC · JPL
3613 Kunlun	1982 VJ_{11}	Kunlun	November 10, 1982	Nanking	Purple Mountain	V · slow	5.7 km (3.5 mi)	MPC · JPL
3614 Tumilty	1983 AE_{1}	Tumilty	January 12, 1983	Anderson Mesa	N. G. Thomas	·	48 km (30 mi)	MPC · JPL
3615 Safronov	1983 WZ	Safronov	November 29, 1983	Anderson Mesa	E. Bowell	THM	25 km (16 mi)	MPC · JPL
3616 Glazunov	1984 JJ_{2}	Glazunov	May 3, 1984	Nauchnij	L. V. Zhuravleva	EUN	9.8 km (6.1 mi)	MPC · JPL
3617 Eicher	1984 LJ	Eicher	June 2, 1984	Anderson Mesa	B. A. Skiff	·	9.2 km (5.7 mi)	MPC · JPL
3618 Kuprin	1979 QP_{8}	Kuprin	August 20, 1979	Nauchnij	N. S. Chernykh	·	16 km (9.9 mi)	MPC · JPL
3619 Nash	1981 EU_{35}	Nash	March 2, 1981	Siding Spring	S. J. Bus	·	6.6 km (4.1 mi)	MPC · JPL
3620 Platonov	1981 RU_{2}	Platonov	September 7, 1981	Nauchnij	L. G. Karachkina	EOS	13 km (8.1 mi)	MPC · JPL
3621 Curtis	1981 SQ_{1}	Curtis	September 26, 1981	Anderson Mesa	N. G. Thomas	THM	16 km (9.9 mi)	MPC · JPL
3622 Ilinsky	1981 SX_{7}	Ilinsky	September 29, 1981	Nauchnij	L. V. Zhuravleva	CYB	22 km (14 mi)	MPC · JPL
3623 Chaplin	1981 TG_{2}	Chaplin	October 4, 1981	Nauchnij	L. G. Karachkina	KOR	9.9 km (6.2 mi)	MPC · JPL
3624 Mironov	1982 TH_{2}	Mironov	October 14, 1982	Nauchnij	L. V. Zhuravleva, L. G. Karachkina	·	8.3 km (5.2 mi)	MPC · JPL
3625 Fracastoro	1984 HZ_{1}	Fracastoro	April 27, 1984	La Silla	W. Ferreri	·	14 km (8.7 mi)	MPC · JPL
3626 Ohsaki	1929 PA	Ohsaki	August 4, 1929	Heidelberg	M. F. Wolf	HYG	18 km (11 mi)	MPC · JPL
3627 Sayers	1973 DS	Sayers	February 28, 1973	Hamburg-Bergedorf	L. Kohoutek	·	11 km (6.8 mi)	MPC · JPL
3628 Božněmcová	1979 WD	Božněmcová	November 25, 1979	Kleť	Z. Vávrová	(887)	6.9 km (4.3 mi)	MPC · JPL
3629 Lebedinskij	1982 WK	Lebedinskij	November 21, 1982	Kleť	A. Mrkos	V	5.8 km (3.6 mi)	MPC · JPL
3630 Lubomír	1984 QN	Lubomír	August 28, 1984	Kleť	A. Mrkos	DOR	13 km (8.1 mi)	MPC · JPL
3631 Sigyn	1987 BV_{1}	Sigyn	January 25, 1987	La Silla	E. W. Elst	·	39 km (24 mi)	MPC · JPL
3632 Grachevka	1976 SJ_{4}	Grachevka	September 24, 1976	Nauchnij	N. S. Chernykh	·	9.1 km (5.7 mi)	MPC · JPL
3633 Mira	1980 EE_{2}	Mira	March 13, 1980	El Leoncito	Félix Aguilar Observatory	·	9.5 km (5.9 mi)	MPC · JPL
3634 Iwan	1980 FV	Iwan	March 16, 1980	La Silla	C.-I. Lagerkvist	·	5.0 km (3.1 mi)	MPC · JPL
3635 Kreutz	1981 WO_{1}	Kreutz	November 21, 1981	Calar Alto	L. Kohoutek	slow	2.8 km (1.7 mi)	MPC · JPL
3636 Pajdušáková	1982 UJ_{2}	Pajdušáková	October 17, 1982	Kleť	A. Mrkos	·	4.1 km (2.5 mi)	MPC · JPL
3637 O'Meara	1984 UQ	O'Meara	October 23, 1984	Anderson Mesa	B. A. Skiff	·	13 km (8.1 mi)	MPC · JPL
3638 Davis	1984 WX	Davis	November 20, 1984	Anderson Mesa	E. Bowell	EOS	18 km (11 mi)	MPC · JPL
3639 Weidenschilling	1985 TX	Weidenschilling	October 15, 1985	Anderson Mesa	E. Bowell	·	6.5 km (4.0 mi)	MPC · JPL
3640 Gostin	1985 TR_{3}	Gostin	October 11, 1985	Palomar	C. S. Shoemaker	·	7.1 km (4.4 mi)	MPC · JPL
3641 Williams Bay	A922 WC	Williams Bay	November 24, 1922	Williams Bay	G. Van Biesbroeck	·	30 km (19 mi)	MPC · JPL
3642 Frieden	1953 XL_{1}	Frieden	December 4, 1953	Sonneberg	Gessner, H.	·	32 km (20 mi)	MPC · JPL
3643 Tienchanglin	1978 UN_{2}	Tienchanglin	October 29, 1978	Nanking	Purple Mountain	PHO · moon	9.8 km (6.1 mi)	MPC · JPL
3644 Kojitaku	1931 TW	Kojitaku	October 5, 1931	Heidelberg	K. Reinmuth	·	5.8 km (3.6 mi)	MPC · JPL
3645 Fabini	1981 QZ	Fabini	August 28, 1981	Kleť	A. Mrkos	·	20 km (12 mi)	MPC · JPL
3646 Aduatiques	1985 RK_{4}	Aduatiques	September 11, 1985	La Silla	H. Debehogne	·	6.3 km (3.9 mi)	MPC · JPL
3647 Dermott	1986 AD_{1}	Dermott	January 11, 1986	Anderson Mesa	E. Bowell	·	27 km (17 mi)	MPC · JPL
3648 Raffinetti	1957 HK	Raffinetti	April 24, 1957	La Plata Observatory	La Plata	·	5.3 km (3.3 mi)	MPC · JPL
3649 Guillermina	1976 HQ	Guillermina	April 26, 1976	El Leoncito	Félix Aguilar Observatory	·	22 km (14 mi)	MPC · JPL
3650 Kunming	1978 UO_{2}	Kunming	October 30, 1978	Nanking	Purple Mountain	·	27 km (17 mi)	MPC · JPL
3651 Friedman	1978 VB_{5}	Friedman	November 7, 1978	Palomar	E. F. Helin, S. J. Bus	·	5.6 km (3.5 mi)	MPC · JPL
3652 Soros	1981 TC_{3}	Soros	October 6, 1981	Nauchnij	T. M. Smirnova	·	13 km (8.1 mi)	MPC · JPL
3653 Klimishin	1979 HF_{5}	Klimishin	April 25, 1979	Nauchnij	N. S. Chernykh	·	5.4 km (3.4 mi)	MPC · JPL
3654 AAS	1949 QH_{1}	AAS	August 21, 1949	Brooklyn	Indiana University	·	4.3 km (2.7 mi)	MPC · JPL
3655 Eupraksia	1978 SA_{3}	Eupraksia	September 26, 1978	Nauchnij	L. V. Zhuravleva	3:2	37 km (23 mi)	MPC · JPL
3656 Hemingway	1978 QX	Hemingway	August 31, 1978	Nauchnij	N. S. Chernykh	·	5.3 km (3.3 mi)	MPC · JPL
3657 Ermolova	1978 ST_{6}	Ermolova	September 26, 1978	Nauchnij	L. V. Zhuravleva	V · moon	6.7 km (4.2 mi)	MPC · JPL
3658 Feldman	1982 TR	Feldman	October 13, 1982	Anderson Mesa	E. Bowell	moon	5.0 km (3.1 mi)	MPC · JPL
3659 Bellingshausen	1969 TE_{2}	Bellingshausen	October 8, 1969	Nauchnij	L. I. Chernykh	·	5.1 km (3.2 mi)	MPC · JPL
3660 Lazarev	1978 QX_{2}	Lazarev	August 31, 1978	Nauchnij	N. S. Chernykh	·	26 km (16 mi)	MPC · JPL
3661 Dolmatovskij	1979 UY_{3}	Dolmatovskij	October 16, 1979	Nauchnij	N. S. Chernykh	KOR	10 km (6.2 mi)	MPC · JPL
3662 Dezhnev	1980 RU_{2}	Dezhnev	September 8, 1980	Nauchnij	L. V. Zhuravleva	EUN	9.4 km (5.8 mi)	MPC · JPL
3663 Tisserand	1985 GK_{1}	Tisserand	April 15, 1985	Anderson Mesa	E. Bowell	THM	13 km (8.1 mi)	MPC · JPL
3664 Anneres	4260 P-L	Anneres	September 24, 1960	Palomar	C. J. van Houten, I. van Houten-Groeneveld, T. Gehrels	slow	9.2 km (5.7 mi)	MPC · JPL
3665 Fitzgerald	1979 FE	Fitzgerald	March 19, 1979	Kleť	A. Mrkos	PHO	7.7 km (4.8 mi)	MPC · JPL
3666 Holman	1979 HP	Holman	April 19, 1979	Cerro Tololo	Muzzio, J. C.	THM	20 km (12 mi)	MPC · JPL
3667 Anne-Marie	1981 EF	Anne-Marie	March 9, 1981	Anderson Mesa	E. Bowell	TIR ·	22 km (14 mi)	MPC · JPL
3668 Ilfpetrov	1982 UM_{7}	Ilfpetrov	October 21, 1982	Nauchnij	L. G. Karachkina	·	6.5 km (4.0 mi)	MPC · JPL
3669 Vertinskij	1982 UO_{7}	Vertinskij	October 21, 1982	Nauchnij	L. G. Karachkina	moon	6.2 km (3.9 mi)	MPC · JPL
3670 Northcott	1983 BN	Northcott	January 22, 1983	Anderson Mesa	E. Bowell	PAD	19 km (12 mi)	MPC · JPL
3671 Dionysus	1984 KD	Dionysus	May 27, 1984	Palomar	C. S. Shoemaker, E. M. Shoemaker	AMO · APO +1 km (0.62 mi) · PHA · moon	1.5 km (0.93 mi)	MPC · JPL
3672 Stevedberg	1985 QQ	Stevedberg	August 22, 1985	Anderson Mesa	E. Bowell	·	5.6 km (3.5 mi)	MPC · JPL
3673 Levy	1985 QS	Levy	August 22, 1985	Anderson Mesa	E. Bowell	moon	6.4 km (4.0 mi)	MPC · JPL
3674 Erbisbühl	1963 RH	Erbisbühl	September 13, 1963	Sonneberg	C. Hoffmeister	·	9.1 km (5.7 mi)	MPC · JPL
3675 Kemstach	1982 YP_{1}	Kemstach	December 23, 1982	Nauchnij	L. G. Karachkina	CYB	19 km (12 mi)	MPC · JPL
3676 Hahn	1984 GA	Hahn	April 3, 1984	Anderson Mesa	E. Bowell	·	5.0 km (3.1 mi)	MPC · JPL
3677 Magnusson	1984 QJ_{1}	Magnusson	August 31, 1984	Anderson Mesa	E. Bowell	·	4.8 km (3.0 mi)	MPC · JPL
3678 Mongmanwai	1966 BO	Mongmanwai	January 20, 1966	Nanking	Purple Mountain	·	8.0 km (5.0 mi)	MPC · JPL
3679 Condruses	1984 DT	Condruses	February 24, 1984	La Silla	H. Debehogne	slow	5.2 km (3.2 mi)	MPC · JPL
3680 Sasha	1987 MY	Sasha	June 28, 1987	Palomar	E. F. Helin	·	7.0 km (4.3 mi)	MPC · JPL
3681 Boyan	1974 QO_{2}	Boyan	August 27, 1974	Nauchnij	L. I. Chernykh	·	4.6 km (2.9 mi)	MPC · JPL
3682 Welther	A923 NB	Welther	July 12, 1923	Heidelberg	K. Reinmuth	·	19 km (12 mi)	MPC · JPL
3683 Baumann	1987 MA	Baumann	June 23, 1987	La Silla	W. Landgraf	·	20 km (12 mi)	MPC · JPL
3684 Berry	1983 AK	Berry	January 9, 1983	Anderson Mesa	B. A. Skiff	·	12 km (7.5 mi)	MPC · JPL
3685 Derdenye	1981 EH_{14}	Derdenye	March 1, 1981	Siding Spring	S. J. Bus	slow	10 km (6.2 mi)	MPC · JPL
3686 Antoku	1987 EB	Antoku	March 3, 1987	Ojima	T. Niijima, T. Urata	·	18 km (11 mi)	MPC · JPL
3687 Dzus	A908 TC	Dzus	October 7, 1908	Heidelberg	A. Kopff	·	31 km (19 mi)	MPC · JPL
3688 Navajo	1981 FD	Navajo	March 30, 1981	Anderson Mesa	E. Bowell	2:1J	6.1 km (3.8 mi)	MPC · JPL
3689 Yeates	1981 JJ_{2}	Yeates	May 5, 1981	Palomar	C. S. Shoemaker	·	14 km (8.7 mi)	MPC · JPL
3690 Larson	1981 PM	Larson	August 3, 1981	Anderson Mesa	E. Bowell	·	5.0 km (3.1 mi)	MPC · JPL
3691 Bede	1982 FT	Bede	March 29, 1982	Cerro El Roble	Gonzalez, L. E.	AMO +1 km (0.62 mi) · slow	4.3 km (2.7 mi)	MPC · JPL
3692 Rickman	1982 HF_{1}	Rickman	April 25, 1982	Anderson Mesa	E. Bowell	·	12 km (7.5 mi)	MPC · JPL
3693 Barringer	1982 RU	Barringer	September 15, 1982	Anderson Mesa	E. Bowell	·	27 km (17 mi)	MPC · JPL
3694 Sharon	1984 SH_{5}	Sharon	September 27, 1984	Palomar	Grossman, A.	3:2	46 km (29 mi)	MPC · JPL
3695 Fiala	1973 UU_{4}	Fiala	October 21, 1973	Anderson Mesa	H. L. Giclas	·	7.7 km (4.8 mi)	MPC · JPL
3696 Herald	1980 OF	Herald	July 17, 1980	Anderson Mesa	E. Bowell	·	16 km (9.9 mi)	MPC · JPL
3697 Guyhurst	1984 EV	Guyhurst	March 6, 1984	Anderson Mesa	E. Bowell	V	4.3 km (2.7 mi)	MPC · JPL
3698 Manning	1984 UA_{2}	Manning	October 29, 1984	Anderson Mesa	E. Bowell	·	6.0 km (3.7 mi)	MPC · JPL
3699 Milbourn	1984 UC_{2}	Milbourn	October 29, 1984	Anderson Mesa	E. Bowell	·	4.7 km (2.9 mi)	MPC · JPL
3700 Geowilliams	1984 UL_{2}	Geowilliams	October 23, 1984	Palomar	C. S. Shoemaker, E. M. Shoemaker	PHO	7.8 km (4.8 mi)	MPC · JPL

== 3701–3800 ==
back to top

Designation			Discovery			Properties		Ref
Permanent	Provisional	Named after	Date	Site	Discoverer(s)	Category	Diam.	Ref
3701 Purkyně	1985 DW	Purkyně	February 20, 1985	Kleť	A. Mrkos	AGN	9.0 km (5.6 mi)	MPC · JPL
3702 Trubetskaya	1970 NB	Trubetskaya	July 3, 1970	Nauchnij	L. I. Chernykh	·	18 km (11 mi)	MPC · JPL
3703 Volkonskaya	1978 PU_{3}	Volkonskaya	August 9, 1978	Nauchnij	L. I. Chernykh	V	3.7 km (2.3 mi)	MPC · JPL
3704 Gaoshiqi	1981 YX_{1}	Gaoshiqi	December 20, 1981	Nanking	Purple Mountain	·	9.6 km (6.0 mi)	MPC · JPL
3705 Hotellasilla	1984 ET_{1}	Hotellasilla	March 4, 1984	La Silla	H. Debehogne	THM	18 km (11 mi)	MPC · JPL
3706 Sinnott	1984 SE_{3}	Sinnott	September 28, 1984	Anderson Mesa	B. A. Skiff	·	4.5 km (2.8 mi)	MPC · JPL
3707 Schröter	1934 CC	Schröter	February 5, 1934	Heidelberg	K. Reinmuth	EUN	9.3 km (5.8 mi)	MPC · JPL
3708 Socus	1974 FV_{1}	Socus	March 21, 1974	Cerro El Roble	University of Chile	L5	76 km (47 mi)	MPC · JPL
3709 Polypoites	1985 TL_{3}	Polypoites	October 14, 1985	Palomar	C. S. Shoemaker	L4	65 km (40 mi)	MPC · JPL
3710 Bogoslovskij	1978 RD_{6}	Bogoslovskij	September 13, 1978	Nauchnij	N. S. Chernykh	·	12 km (7.5 mi)	MPC · JPL
3711 Ellensburg	1983 QD	Ellensburg	August 31, 1983	Palomar	Gibson, J.	EUN	6.8 km (4.2 mi)	MPC · JPL
3712 Kraft	1984 YC	Kraft	December 22, 1984	Mount Hamilton	E. A. Harlan, A. R. Klemola	·	11 km (6.8 mi)	MPC · JPL
3713 Pieters	1985 FA_{2}	Pieters	March 22, 1985	Anderson Mesa	E. Bowell	EOS	16 km (9.9 mi)	MPC · JPL
3714 Kenrussell	1983 TT_{1}	Kenrussell	October 12, 1983	Anderson Mesa	E. Bowell	EUN	11 km (6.8 mi)	MPC · JPL
3715 Štohl	1980 DS	Štohl	February 19, 1980	Kleť	A. Mrkos	·	4.9 km (3.0 mi)	MPC · JPL
3716 Petzval	1980 TG	Petzval	October 2, 1980	Kleť	A. Mrkos	·	4.7 km (2.9 mi)	MPC · JPL
3717 Thorenia	1964 CG	Thorenia	February 15, 1964	Brooklyn	Indiana University	(3460)	17 km (11 mi)	MPC · JPL
3718 Dunbar	1978 VS_{10}	Dunbar	November 7, 1978	Palomar	E. F. Helin, S. J. Bus	·	7.0 km (4.3 mi)	MPC · JPL
3719 Karamzin	1976 YO_{1}	Karamzin	December 16, 1976	Nauchnij	L. I. Chernykh	·	7.3 km (4.5 mi)	MPC · JPL
3720 Hokkaido	1987 UR_{1}	Hokkaido	October 28, 1987	Kushiro	S. Ueda, H. Kaneda	V	4.2 km (2.6 mi)	MPC · JPL
3721 Widorn	1982 TU	Widorn	October 13, 1982	Anderson Mesa	E. Bowell	EOS	14 km (8.7 mi)	MPC · JPL
3722 Urata	1927 UE	Urata	October 29, 1927	Heidelberg	K. Reinmuth	·	7.9 km (4.9 mi)	MPC · JPL
3723 Voznesenskij	1976 GK_{2}	Voznesenskij	April 1, 1976	Nauchnij	N. S. Chernykh	·	9.7 km (6.0 mi)	MPC · JPL
3724 Annenskij	1979 YN_{8}	Annenskij	December 23, 1979	Nauchnij	L. V. Zhuravleva	GEF	15 km (9.3 mi)	MPC · JPL
3725 Valsecchi	1981 EA_{11}	Valsecchi	March 1, 1981	Siding Spring	S. J. Bus	ADE	7.3 km (4.5 mi)	MPC · JPL
3726 Johnadams	1981 LJ	Johnadams	June 4, 1981	Anderson Mesa	E. Bowell	KOR	10 km (6.2 mi)	MPC · JPL
3727 Maxhell	1981 PQ	Maxhell	August 7, 1981	Kleť	A. Mrkos	CYB	28 km (17 mi)	MPC · JPL
3728 IRAS	1983 QF	IRAS	August 23, 1983	IRAS	IRAS	·	23 km (14 mi)	MPC · JPL
3729 Yangzhou	1983 VP_{7}	Yangzhou	November 1, 1983	Nanking	Purple Mountain	EUN	13 km (8.1 mi)	MPC · JPL
3730 Hurban	1983 XM_{1}	Hurban	December 4, 1983	Piszkéstető	M. Antal	·	27 km (17 mi)	MPC · JPL
3731 Hancock	1984 DH_{1}	Hancock	February 20, 1984	Bickley	Perth Observatory	·	53 km (33 mi)	MPC · JPL
3732 Vávra	1984 SR_{1}	Vávra	September 27, 1984	Kleť	Z. Vávrová	·	3.8 km (2.4 mi)	MPC · JPL
3733 Yoshitomo	1985 AF	Yoshitomo	January 15, 1985	Toyota	K. Suzuki, T. Urata	slow	13 km (8.1 mi)	MPC · JPL
3734 Waland	9527 P-L	Waland	October 17, 1960	Palomar	C. J. van Houten, I. van Houten-Groeneveld, T. Gehrels	AGN	9.0 km (5.6 mi)	MPC · JPL
3735 Třeboň	1983 XS	Třeboň	December 4, 1983	Kleť	Z. Vávrová	·	21 km (13 mi)	MPC · JPL
3736 Rokoske	1987 SY_{3}	Rokoske	September 26, 1987	Anderson Mesa	E. Bowell	EOS	20 km (12 mi)	MPC · JPL
3737 Beckman	1983 PA	Beckman	August 8, 1983	Palomar	E. F. Helin	·	7.0 km (4.3 mi)	MPC · JPL
3738 Ots	1977 QA_{1}	Ots	August 19, 1977	Nauchnij	N. S. Chernykh	·	7.0 km (4.3 mi)	MPC · JPL
3739 Rem	1977 RE_{2}	Rem	September 8, 1977	Nauchnij	N. S. Chernykh	·	6.7 km (4.2 mi)	MPC · JPL
3740 Menge	1981 EM	Menge	March 1, 1981	La Silla	H. Debehogne, G. de Sanctis	·	8.6 km (5.3 mi)	MPC · JPL
3741 Rogerburns	1981 EL_{19}	Rogerburns	March 2, 1981	Siding Spring	S. J. Bus	·	6.1 km (3.8 mi)	MPC · JPL
3742 Sunshine	1981 EQ_{27}	Sunshine	March 2, 1981	Siding Spring	S. J. Bus	·	5.3 km (3.3 mi)	MPC · JPL
3743 Pauljaniczek	1983 EW	Pauljaniczek	March 10, 1983	Anderson Mesa	E. Barr	·	4.6 km (2.9 mi)	MPC · JPL
3744 Horn-d'Arturo	1983 VE	Horn-d'Arturo	November 5, 1983	Bologna	San Vittore	·	15 km (9.3 mi)	MPC · JPL
3745 Petaev	1949 SF	Petaev	September 23, 1949	Heidelberg	K. Reinmuth	·	11 km (6.8 mi)	MPC · JPL
3746 Heyuan	1964 TC_{1}	Heyuan	October 8, 1964	Nanking	Purple Mountain	·	15 km (9.3 mi)	MPC · JPL
3747 Belinskij	1975 VY_{5}	Belinskij	November 5, 1975	Nauchnij	L. I. Chernykh	·	27 km (17 mi)	MPC · JPL
3748 Tatum	1981 JQ	Tatum	May 3, 1981	Anderson Mesa	E. Bowell	·	9.7 km (6.0 mi)	MPC · JPL
3749 Balam	1982 BG_{1}	Balam	January 24, 1982	Anderson Mesa	E. Bowell	moon	4.7 km (2.9 mi)	MPC · JPL
3750 Ilizarov	1982 TD_{1}	Ilizarov	October 14, 1982	Nauchnij	L. G. Karachkina	EOS	12 km (7.5 mi)	MPC · JPL
3751 Kiang	1983 NK	Kiang	July 10, 1983	Anderson Mesa	E. Bowell	·	24 km (15 mi)	MPC · JPL
3752 Camillo	1985 PA	Camillo	August 15, 1985	Caussols	E. F. Helin, M. A. Barucci	APO +1 km (0.62 mi)	2.3 km (1.4 mi)	MPC · JPL
3753 Cruithne	1986 TO	Cruithne	October 10, 1986	Siding Spring	J. D. Waldron	ATE +1 km (0.62 mi)	2.1 km (1.3 mi)	MPC · JPL
3754 Kathleen	1931 FM	Kathleen	March 16, 1931	Flagstaff	C. W. Tombaugh	·	54 km (34 mi)	MPC · JPL
3755 Lecointe	1950 SJ	Lecointe	September 19, 1950	Uccle	S. J. Arend	·	4.8 km (3.0 mi)	MPC · JPL
3756 Ruscannon	1979 MV_{6}	Ruscannon	June 25, 1979	Siding Spring	E. F. Helin, S. J. Bus	·	8.4 km (5.2 mi)	MPC · JPL
3757 Anagolay	1982 XB	Anagolay	December 14, 1982	Palomar	E. F. Helin	AMO · APO · PHA	500 m (1,600 ft)	MPC · JPL
3758 Karttunen	1983 WP	Karttunen	November 28, 1983	Anderson Mesa	E. Bowell	EUN	7.8 km (4.8 mi)	MPC · JPL
3759 Piironen	1984 AP	Piironen	January 8, 1984	Anderson Mesa	E. Bowell	·	32 km (20 mi)	MPC · JPL
3760 Poutanen	1984 AQ	Poutanen	January 8, 1984	Anderson Mesa	E. Bowell	·	10 km (6.2 mi)	MPC · JPL
3761 Romanskaya	1936 OH	Romanskaya	July 25, 1936	Crimea-Simeis	G. N. Neujmin	·	33 km (21 mi)	MPC · JPL
3762 Amaravella	1976 QN_{1}	Amaravella	August 26, 1976	Nauchnij	N. S. Chernykh	·	3.9 km (2.4 mi)	MPC · JPL
3763 Qianxuesen	1980 TA_{6}	Qianxuesen	October 14, 1980	Nanking	Purple Mountain	·	7.0 km (4.3 mi)	MPC · JPL
3764 Holmesacourt	1980 TL_{15}	Holmesacourt	October 10, 1980	Bickley	Perth Observatory	·	5.7 km (3.5 mi)	MPC · JPL
3765 Texereau	1982 SU_{1}	Texereau	September 16, 1982	Caussols	K. Tomita	KOR	7.4 km (4.6 mi)	MPC · JPL
3766 Junepatterson	1983 BF	Junepatterson	January 16, 1983	Anderson Mesa	E. Bowell	THM	25 km (16 mi)	MPC · JPL
3767 DiMaggio	1986 LC	DiMaggio	June 3, 1986	Palomar	E. F. Helin	·	13 km (8.1 mi)	MPC · JPL
3768 Monroe	1937 RB	Monroe	September 5, 1937	Johannesburg	C. Jackson	·	27 km (17 mi)	MPC · JPL
3769 Arthurmiller	1967 UV	Arthurmiller	October 30, 1967	Hamburg-Bergedorf	L. Kohoutek, Kriete, A.	·	4.8 km (3.0 mi)	MPC · JPL
3770 Nizami	1974 QT_{1}	Nizami	August 24, 1974	Nauchnij	L. I. Chernykh	·	3.4 km (2.1 mi)	MPC · JPL
3771 Alexejtolstoj	1974 SB_{3}	Alexejtolstoj	September 20, 1974	Nauchnij	L. V. Zhuravleva	(883)	4.3 km (2.7 mi)	MPC · JPL
3772 Piaf	1982 UR_{7}	Piaf	October 21, 1982	Nauchnij	L. G. Karachkina	EOS	19 km (12 mi)	MPC · JPL
3773 Smithsonian	1984 YY	Smithsonian	December 23, 1984	Harvard Observatory	Oak Ridge Observatory	·	6.4 km (4.0 mi)	MPC · JPL
3774 Megumi	1987 YC	Megumi	December 20, 1987	Chiyoda	T. Kojima	EOS	18 km (11 mi)	MPC · JPL
3775 Ellenbeth	1931 TC_{4}	Ellenbeth	October 6, 1931	Flagstaff	C. W. Tombaugh	DOR	17 km (11 mi)	MPC · JPL
3776 Vartiovuori	1938 GG	Vartiovuori	April 5, 1938	Turku	H. Alikoski	·	22 km (14 mi)	MPC · JPL
3777 McCauley	1981 JD_{2}	McCauley	May 5, 1981	Palomar	C. S. Shoemaker	·	6.5 km (4.0 mi)	MPC · JPL
3778 Regge	1984 HK_{1}	Regge	April 26, 1984	La Silla	W. Ferreri	KOR	8.7 km (5.4 mi)	MPC · JPL
3779 Kieffer	1985 JV_{1}	Kieffer	May 13, 1985	Palomar	C. S. Shoemaker	EUN	15 km (9.3 mi)	MPC · JPL
3780 Maury	1985 RL	Maury	September 14, 1985	Anderson Mesa	E. Bowell	KOR	12 km (7.5 mi)	MPC · JPL
3781 Dufek	1986 RG_{1}	Dufek	September 2, 1986	Kleť	A. Mrkos	KOR · slow	8.3 km (5.2 mi)	MPC · JPL
3782 Celle	1986 TE	Celle	October 3, 1986	Brorfelde	P. Jensen	V · moon	5.9 km (3.7 mi)	MPC · JPL
3783 Morris	1986 TW_{1}	Morris	October 7, 1986	Anderson Mesa	E. Bowell	·	4.9 km (3.0 mi)	MPC · JPL
3784 Chopin	1986 UL_{1}	Chopin	October 31, 1986	Haute-Provence	E. W. Elst	·	29 km (18 mi)	MPC · JPL
3785 Kitami	1986 WM	Kitami	November 30, 1986	Geisei	T. Seki	THM	20 km (12 mi)	MPC · JPL
3786 Yamada	1988 AE	Yamada	January 10, 1988	Chiyoda	T. Kojima	MAR	13 km (8.1 mi)	MPC · JPL
3787 Aivazovskij	1977 RG_{7}	Aivazovskij	September 11, 1977	Nauchnij	N. S. Chernykh	·	12 km (7.5 mi)	MPC · JPL
3788 Steyaert	1986 QM_{3}	Steyaert	August 29, 1986	La Silla	H. Debehogne	GEF	9.8 km (6.1 mi)	MPC · JPL
3789 Zhongguo	1928 UF	Zhongguo	October 25, 1928	Williams Bay	Y. C. Chang	CYB · 2:1J	14 km (8.7 mi)	MPC · JPL
3790 Raywilson	1937 UE	Raywilson	October 26, 1937	Heidelberg	K. Reinmuth	THM	14 km (8.7 mi)	MPC · JPL
3791 Marci	1981 WV_{1}	Marci	November 17, 1981	Kleť	A. Mrkos	KOR ·	12 km (7.5 mi)	MPC · JPL
3792 Preston	1985 FA	Preston	March 22, 1985	Palomar	C. S. Shoemaker	PHO · moon	5.2 km (3.2 mi)	MPC · JPL
3793 Leonteus	1985 TE_{3}	Leonteus	October 11, 1985	Palomar	C. S. Shoemaker	L4	112 km (70 mi)	MPC · JPL
3794 Sthenelos	1985 TF_{3}	Sthenelos	October 12, 1985	Palomar	C. S. Shoemaker	L4	35 km (22 mi)	MPC · JPL
3795 Nigel	1986 GV_{1}	Nigel	April 8, 1986	Palomar	E. F. Helin	·	10 km (6.2 mi)	MPC · JPL
3796 Lene	1986 XJ	Lene	December 6, 1986	Brorfelde	P. Jensen	·	19 km (12 mi)	MPC · JPL
3797 Ching-Sung Yu	1987 YL	Ching-Sung Yu	December 22, 1987	Harvard Observatory	Oak Ridge Observatory	THM	12 km (7.5 mi)	MPC · JPL
3798 de Jager	2402 T-3	de Jager	October 16, 1977	Palomar	C. J. van Houten, I. van Houten-Groeneveld, T. Gehrels	·	4.7 km (2.9 mi)	MPC · JPL
3799 Novgorod	1979 SL_{9}	Novgorod	September 22, 1979	Nauchnij	N. S. Chernykh	THM	17 km (11 mi)	MPC · JPL
3800 Karayusuf	1984 AB	Karayusuf	January 4, 1984	Palomar	E. F. Helin	·	1.6 km (0.99 mi)	MPC · JPL

== 3801–3900 ==
back to top

Designation			Discovery			Properties		Ref
Permanent	Provisional	Named after	Date	Site	Discoverer(s)	Category	Diam.	Ref
3801 Thrasymedes	1985 VS	Thrasymedes	November 6, 1985	Kitt Peak	Spacewatch	L4	34 km (21 mi)	MPC · JPL
3802 Dornburg	1986 PJ_{4}	Dornburg	August 7, 1986	Tautenburg Observatory	F. Börngen	·	3.9 km (2.4 mi)	MPC · JPL
3803 Tuchkova	1981 TP_{1}	Tuchkova	October 2, 1981	Nauchnij	L. V. Zhuravleva	·	38 km (24 mi)	MPC · JPL
3804 Drunina	1969 TB_{2}	Drunina	October 8, 1969	Nauchnij	L. I. Chernykh	KOR	8.8 km (5.5 mi)	MPC · JPL
3805 Goldreich	1981 DK_{3}	Goldreich	February 28, 1981	Siding Spring	S. J. Bus	EUN	13 km (8.1 mi)	MPC · JPL
3806 Tremaine	1981 EW_{32}	Tremaine	March 1, 1981	Siding Spring	S. J. Bus	(887)	4.8 km (3.0 mi)	MPC · JPL
3807 Pagels	1981 SE_{1}	Pagels	September 26, 1981	Anderson Mesa	B. A. Skiff, N. G. Thomas	·	5.5 km (3.4 mi)	MPC · JPL
3808 Tempel	1982 FQ_{2}	Tempel	March 24, 1982	Tautenburg Observatory	F. Börngen	·	4.7 km (2.9 mi)	MPC · JPL
3809 Amici	1984 FA	Amici	March 26, 1984	Bologna	San Vittore	·	8.2 km (5.1 mi)	MPC · JPL
3810 Aoraki	1985 DX	Aoraki	February 20, 1985	Lake Tekapo	A. C. Gilmore, P. M. Kilmartin	·	5.6 km (3.5 mi)	MPC · JPL
3811 Karma	1953 TH	Karma	October 13, 1953	Turku	L. Oterma	KRM	30 km (19 mi)	MPC · JPL
3812 Lidaksum	1965 AK_{1}	Lidaksum	January 11, 1965	Nanking	Purple Mountain	·	34 km (21 mi)	MPC · JPL
3813 Fortov	1970 QA_{1}	Fortov	August 30, 1970	Nauchnij	T. M. Smirnova	(254)	5.1 km (3.2 mi)	MPC · JPL
3814 Hoshi-no-mura	1981 JA	Hoshi-no-mura	May 4, 1981	Tōkai	T. Furuta	THM	15 km (9.3 mi)	MPC · JPL
3815 König	1959 GG	König	April 15, 1959	Heidelberg	Konig, A., Jackisch, G., W. Wenzel	KON	20 km (12 mi)	MPC · JPL
3816 Chugainov	1975 VG_{9}	Chugainov	November 8, 1975	Nauchnij	N. S. Chernykh	EUN	12 km (7.5 mi)	MPC · JPL
3817 Lencarter	1979 MK_{1}	Lencarter	June 25, 1979	Siding Spring	E. F. Helin, S. J. Bus	slow	3.4 km (2.1 mi)	MPC · JPL
3818 Gorlitsa	1979 QL_{8}	Gorlitsa	August 20, 1979	Nauchnij	N. S. Chernykh	NYS ·	8.8 km (5.5 mi)	MPC · JPL
3819 Robinson	1983 AR	Robinson	January 12, 1983	Anderson Mesa	B. A. Skiff	·	10 km (6.2 mi)	MPC · JPL
3820 Sauval	1984 DV	Sauval	February 25, 1984	La Silla	H. Debehogne	EOS	13 km (8.1 mi)	MPC · JPL
3821 Sonet	1985 RC_{3}	Sonet	September 6, 1985	La Silla	H. Debehogne	·	15 km (9.3 mi)	MPC · JPL
3822 Segovia	1988 DP_{1}	Segovia	February 21, 1988	Geisei	T. Seki	·	5.0 km (3.1 mi)	MPC · JPL
3823 Yorii	1988 EC_{1}	Yorii	March 10, 1988	Yorii	M. Arai, H. Mori	·	12 km (7.5 mi)	MPC · JPL
3824 Brendalee	1929 TK	Brendalee	October 5, 1929	Flagstaff	C. W. Tombaugh	·	5.2 km (3.2 mi)	MPC · JPL
3825 Nürnberg	1967 UR	Nürnberg	October 30, 1967	Hamburg-Bergedorf	L. Kohoutek	·	6.5 km (4.0 mi)	MPC · JPL
3826 Handel	1973 UV_{5}	Handel	October 27, 1973	Tautenburg Observatory	F. Börngen	·	4.8 km (3.0 mi)	MPC · JPL
3827 Zdeněkhorský	1986 VU	Zdeněkhorský	November 3, 1986	Kleť	A. Mrkos	NEM	12 km (7.5 mi)	MPC · JPL
3828 Hoshino	1986 WC	Hoshino	November 22, 1986	Toyota	K. Suzuki, T. Urata	·	19 km (12 mi)	MPC · JPL
3829 Gunma	1988 EM	Gunma	March 10, 1988	Chiyoda	T. Kojima	DOR	24 km (15 mi)	MPC · JPL
3830 Trelleborg	1986 RL	Trelleborg	September 11, 1986	Brorfelde	P. Jensen	EOS	18 km (11 mi)	MPC · JPL
3831 Pettengill	1986 TP_{2}	Pettengill	October 7, 1986	Anderson Mesa	E. Bowell	·	5.8 km (3.6 mi)	MPC · JPL
3832 Shapiro	1981 QJ	Shapiro	August 30, 1981	Anderson Mesa	E. Bowell	THM	16 km (9.9 mi)	MPC · JPL
3833 Calingasta	1971 SC	Calingasta	September 27, 1971	El Leoncito	Gibson, J., C. U. Cesco	slow	2.1 km (1.3 mi)	MPC · JPL
3834 Zappafrank	1980 JE	Zappafrank	May 11, 1980	Kleť	L. Brožek	·	9.9 km (6.2 mi)	MPC · JPL
3835 Korolenko	1977 SD_{3}	Korolenko	September 23, 1977	Nauchnij	N. S. Chernykh	EUN	9.8 km (6.1 mi)	MPC · JPL
3836 Lem	1979 SR_{9}	Lem	September 22, 1979	Nauchnij	N. S. Chernykh	fast	4.1 km (2.5 mi)	MPC · JPL
3837 Carr	1981 JU_{2}	Carr	May 6, 1981	Palomar	C. S. Shoemaker	·	6.8 km (4.2 mi)	MPC · JPL
3838 Epona	1986 WA	Epona	November 27, 1986	Palomar	A. Maury	APO +1 km (0.62 mi)	2.6 km (1.6 mi)	MPC · JPL
3839 Bogaevskij	1971 OU	Bogaevskij	July 26, 1971	Nauchnij	N. S. Chernykh	slow	7.4 km (4.6 mi)	MPC · JPL
3840 Mimistrobell	1980 TN_{4}	Mimistrobell	October 9, 1980	Palomar	C. S. Shoemaker	·	5.2 km (3.2 mi)	MPC · JPL
3841 Dicicco	1983 VG_{7}	Dicicco	November 4, 1983	Anderson Mesa	B. A. Skiff	moon	6.3 km (3.9 mi)	MPC · JPL
3842 Harlansmith	1985 FC_{1}	Harlansmith	March 21, 1985	Anderson Mesa	E. Bowell	·	7.0 km (4.3 mi)	MPC · JPL
3843 OISCA	1987 DM	OISCA	February 28, 1987	Gekko	Y. Oshima	3:2	31 km (19 mi)	MPC · JPL
3844 Lujiaxi	1966 BZ	Lujiaxi	January 30, 1966	Nanking	Purple Mountain	·	16 km (9.9 mi)	MPC · JPL
3845 Neyachenko	1979 SA_{10}	Neyachenko	September 22, 1979	Nauchnij	N. S. Chernykh	CYB	26 km (16 mi)	MPC · JPL
3846 Hazel	1980 TK_{5}	Hazel	October 9, 1980	Palomar	C. S. Shoemaker	·	22 km (14 mi)	MPC · JPL
3847 Šindel	1982 DY_{1}	Šindel	February 16, 1982	Kleť	A. Mrkos	·	19 km (12 mi)	MPC · JPL
3848 Analucia	1982 FH_{3}	Analucia	March 21, 1982	La Silla	H. Debehogne	·	9.9 km (6.2 mi)	MPC · JPL
3849 Incidentia	1984 FC	Incidentia	March 31, 1984	Anderson Mesa	E. Bowell	·	5.8 km (3.6 mi)	MPC · JPL
3850 Peltier	1986 TK_{2}	Peltier	October 7, 1986	Anderson Mesa	E. Bowell	·	5.5 km (3.4 mi)	MPC · JPL
3851 Alhambra	1986 UZ	Alhambra	October 30, 1986	Geisei	T. Seki	·	6.5 km (4.0 mi)	MPC · JPL
3852 Glennford	1987 DR_{6}	Glennford	February 24, 1987	La Silla	H. Debehogne	THM	19 km (12 mi)	MPC · JPL
3853 Haas	1981 WG_{1}	Haas	November 24, 1981	Anderson Mesa	E. Bowell	slow	8.1 km (5.0 mi)	MPC · JPL
3854 George	1983 EA	George	March 13, 1983	Palomar	C. S. Shoemaker, E. M. Shoemaker	H	3.0 km (1.9 mi)	MPC · JPL
3855 Pasasymphonia	1986 NF_{1}	Pasasymphonia	July 4, 1986	Palomar	E. F. Helin	·	5.7 km (3.5 mi)	MPC · JPL
3856 Lutskij	1976 QX	Lutskij	August 26, 1976	Nauchnij	N. S. Chernykh	KOR	10 km (6.2 mi)	MPC · JPL
3857 Cellino	1984 CD_{1}	Cellino	February 8, 1984	Anderson Mesa	E. Bowell	NYS	5.8 km (3.6 mi)	MPC · JPL
3858 Dorchester	1986 TG	Dorchester	October 3, 1986	Brorfelde	P. Jensen	·	3.3 km (2.1 mi)	MPC · JPL
3859 Börngen	1987 EW	Börngen	March 4, 1987	Anderson Mesa	E. Bowell	THM	21 km (13 mi)	MPC · JPL
3860 Plovdiv	1986 PM_{4}	Plovdiv	August 8, 1986	Smolyan	E. W. Elst, V. G. Ivanova	GEF	13 km (8.1 mi)	MPC · JPL
3861 Lorenz	A910 FA	Lorenz	March 30, 1910	Heidelberg	J. Helffrich	·	8.2 km (5.1 mi)	MPC · JPL
3862 Agekian	1972 KM	Agekian	May 18, 1972	Nauchnij	T. M. Smirnova	·	6.5 km (4.0 mi)	MPC · JPL
3863 Gilyarovskij	1978 SJ_{3}	Gilyarovskij	September 26, 1978	Nauchnij	L. V. Zhuravleva	·	6.5 km (4.0 mi)	MPC · JPL
3864 Søren	1986 XF	Søren	December 6, 1986	Brorfelde	P. Jensen	·	8.3 km (5.2 mi)	MPC · JPL
3865 Lindbloom	1988 AY_{4}	Lindbloom	January 13, 1988	La Silla	H. Debehogne	moon	8.0 km (5.0 mi)	MPC · JPL
3866 Langley	1988 BH_{4}	Langley	January 20, 1988	La Silla	H. Debehogne	·	23 km (14 mi)	MPC · JPL
3867 Shiretoko	1988 HG	Shiretoko	April 16, 1988	Kitami	M. Yanai, K. Watanabe	·	5.3 km (3.3 mi)	MPC · JPL
3868 Mendoza	4575 P-L	Mendoza	September 24, 1960	Palomar	C. J. van Houten, I. van Houten-Groeneveld, T. Gehrels	moon	8.6 km (5.3 mi)	MPC · JPL
3869 Norton	1981 JE	Norton	May 3, 1981	Anderson Mesa	E. Bowell	·	8.4 km (5.2 mi)	MPC · JPL
3870 Mayré	1988 CG_{3}	Mayré	February 13, 1988	La Silla	E. W. Elst	EUN	12 km (7.5 mi)	MPC · JPL
3871 Reiz	1982 DR_{2}	Reiz	February 18, 1982	La Silla	R. M. West	URS	20 km (12 mi)	MPC · JPL
3872 Akirafujii	1983 AV	Akirafujii	January 12, 1983	Anderson Mesa	B. A. Skiff	·	13 km (8.1 mi)	MPC · JPL
3873 Roddy	1984 WB	Roddy	November 21, 1984	Palomar	C. S. Shoemaker	H · moon	5.0 km (3.1 mi)	MPC · JPL
3874 Stuart	1986 TJ_{1}	Stuart	October 4, 1986	Anderson Mesa	E. Bowell	·	8.5 km (5.3 mi)	MPC · JPL
3875 Staehle	1988 KE	Staehle	May 17, 1988	Palomar	E. F. Helin	·	6.6 km (4.1 mi)	MPC · JPL
3876 Quaide	1988 KJ	Quaide	May 19, 1988	Palomar	E. F. Helin	EOS	17 km (11 mi)	MPC · JPL
3877 Braes	3108 P-L	Braes	September 24, 1960	Palomar	C. J. van Houten, I. van Houten-Groeneveld, T. Gehrels	EUN	9.6 km (6.0 mi)	MPC · JPL
3878 Jyoumon	1982 VR_{4}	Jyoumon	November 14, 1982	Kiso	H. Kosai, K. Furukawa	THM	14 km (8.7 mi)	MPC · JPL
3879 Machar	1983 QA	Machar	August 16, 1983	Kleť	Z. Vávrová	·	5.7 km (3.5 mi)	MPC · JPL
3880 Kaiserman	1984 WK	Kaiserman	November 21, 1984	Palomar	C. S. Shoemaker, E. M. Shoemaker	H	3.1 km (1.9 mi)	MPC · JPL
3881 Doumergua	1925 VF	Doumergua	November 15, 1925	Algiers	B. Jekhovsky	NYS	11 km (6.8 mi)	MPC · JPL
3882 Johncox	1962 RN	Johncox	September 7, 1962	Brooklyn	Indiana University	·	5.9 km (3.7 mi)	MPC · JPL
3883 Verbano	1972 RQ	Verbano	September 7, 1972	Nauchnij	N. S. Chernykh	·	12 km (7.5 mi)	MPC · JPL
3884 Alferov	1977 EM_{1}	Alferov	March 13, 1977	Nauchnij	N. S. Chernykh	THM · slow	13 km (8.1 mi)	MPC · JPL
3885 Bogorodskij	1979 HG_{5}	Bogorodskij	April 25, 1979	Nauchnij	N. S. Chernykh	·	15 km (9.3 mi)	MPC · JPL
3886 Shcherbakovia	1981 RU_{3}	Shcherbakovia	September 3, 1981	Nauchnij	N. S. Chernykh	·	19 km (12 mi)	MPC · JPL
3887 Gerstner	1985 QX	Gerstner	August 22, 1985	Kleť	A. Mrkos	EOS	8.6 km (5.3 mi)	MPC · JPL
3888 Hoyt	1984 FO	Hoyt	March 28, 1984	Palomar	C. S. Shoemaker	PHO	5.2 km (3.2 mi)	MPC · JPL
3889 Menshikov	1972 RT_{3}	Menshikov	September 6, 1972	Nauchnij	L. V. Zhuravleva	MIS	14 km (8.7 mi)	MPC · JPL
3890 Bunin	1976 YU_{5}	Bunin	December 18, 1976	Nauchnij	L. I. Chernykh	·	9.8 km (6.1 mi)	MPC · JPL
3891 Werner	1981 EY_{31}	Werner	March 3, 1981	Siding Spring	S. J. Bus	NYS	3.2 km (2.0 mi)	MPC · JPL
3892 Dezsö	1941 HD	Dezsö	April 19, 1941	Turku	L. Oterma	EUN	7.8 km (4.8 mi)	MPC · JPL
3893 DeLaeter	1980 FG_{12}	DeLaeter	March 20, 1980	Perth Observatory	M. P. Candy	·	13 km (8.1 mi)	MPC · JPL
3894 Williamcooke	1980 PQ_{2}	Williamcooke	August 14, 1980	Perth Observatory	Jekabsons, P., M. P. Candy	EUN	8.8 km (5.5 mi)	MPC · JPL
3895 Earhart	1987 DE	Earhart	February 23, 1987	Palomar	C. S. Shoemaker	PHO	10 km (6.2 mi)	MPC · JPL
3896 Pordenone	1987 WB	Pordenone	November 18, 1987	Chions	J. M. Baur	EOS	18 km (11 mi)	MPC · JPL
3897 Louhi	1942 RT	Louhi	September 8, 1942	Turku	Y. Väisälä	·	11 km (6.8 mi)	MPC · JPL
3898 Curlewis	1981 SF_{9}	Curlewis	September 26, 1981	Perth Observatory	M. P. Candy	THM	16 km (9.9 mi)	MPC · JPL
3899 Wichterle	1982 SN_{1}	Wichterle	September 17, 1982	Kleť	Mahrová, M.	THM	21 km (13 mi)	MPC · JPL
3900 Knežević	1985 RK	Knežević	September 14, 1985	Anderson Mesa	E. Bowell	·	5.0 km (3.1 mi)	MPC · JPL

== 3901–4000 ==
back to top

Designation			Discovery			Properties		Ref
Permanent	Provisional	Named after	Date	Site	Discoverer(s)	Category	Diam.	Ref
3901 Nanjingdaxue	1958 GQ	Nanjingdaxue	April 7, 1958	Nanking	Purple Mountain	·	19 km (12 mi)	MPC · JPL
3902 Yoritomo	1986 AL	Yoritomo	January 14, 1986	Karasuyama	S. Inoda, T. Urata	URS	28 km (17 mi)	MPC · JPL
3903 Kliment Ohridski	1987 SV_{2}	Kliment Ohridski	September 20, 1987	Smolyan	E. W. Elst	KOR	9.8 km (6.1 mi)	MPC · JPL
3904 Honda	1988 DQ	Honda	February 22, 1988	Siding Spring	R. H. McNaught	·	15 km (9.3 mi)	MPC · JPL
3905 Doppler	1984 QO	Doppler	August 28, 1984	Kleť	A. Mrkos	moon	8.0 km (5.0 mi)	MPC · JPL
3906 Chao	1987 KE_{1}	Chao	May 31, 1987	Palomar	C. S. Shoemaker	·	46 km (29 mi)	MPC · JPL
3907 Kilmartin	A904 PC	Kilmartin	August 14, 1904	Heidelberg	M. F. Wolf	·	8.6 km (5.3 mi)	MPC · JPL
3908 Nyx	1980 PA	Nyx	August 6, 1980	La Silla	H.-E. Schuster	AMO +1 km (0.62 mi)	1.0 km (0.62 mi)	MPC · JPL
3909 Gladys	1988 JD_{1}	Gladys	May 15, 1988	Anderson Mesa	Zeigler, K. W.	EUN	10 km (6.2 mi)	MPC · JPL
3910 Liszt	1988 SF	Liszt	September 16, 1988	Haute-Provence	E. W. Elst	GEF	10 km (6.2 mi)	MPC · JPL
3911 Otomo	1940 QB	Otomo	August 31, 1940	Heidelberg	K. Reinmuth	EOS	19 km (12 mi)	MPC · JPL
3912 Troja	1988 SG	Troja	September 16, 1988	Haute-Provence	E. W. Elst	moon	5.9 km (3.7 mi)	MPC · JPL
3913 Chemin	1986 XO_{2}	Chemin	December 2, 1986	Caussols	CERGA	PHO	6.4 km (4.0 mi)	MPC · JPL
3914 Kotogahama	1987 SE	Kotogahama	September 16, 1987	Geisei	T. Seki	EOS	15 km (9.3 mi)	MPC · JPL
3915 Fukushima	1988 PA_{1}	Fukushima	August 15, 1988	Kitami	M. Yanai, K. Watanabe	PHO	22 km (14 mi)	MPC · JPL
3916 Maeva	1981 QA_{3}	Maeva	August 24, 1981	La Silla	H. Debehogne	·	20 km (12 mi)	MPC · JPL
3917 Franz Schubert	1961 CX	Franz Schubert	February 15, 1961	Tautenburg Observatory	F. Börngen	·	5.1 km (3.2 mi)	MPC · JPL
3918 Brel	1988 PE_{1}	Brel	August 13, 1988	Haute-Provence	E. W. Elst	moon	6.3 km (3.9 mi)	MPC · JPL
3919 Maryanning	1984 DS	Maryanning	February 23, 1984	La Silla	H. Debehogne	·	4.8 km (3.0 mi)	MPC · JPL
3920 Aubignan	1948 WF	Aubignan	November 28, 1948	Uccle	S. J. Arend	·	6.0 km (3.7 mi)	MPC · JPL
3921 Klementʹev	1971 OH	Klementʹev	July 19, 1971	Nauchnij	B. A. Burnasheva	·	17 km (11 mi)	MPC · JPL
3922 Heather	1971 SP_{3}	Heather	September 26, 1971	Cerro El Roble	C. Torres	·	14 km (8.7 mi)	MPC · JPL
3923 Radzievskij	1976 SN_{3}	Radzievskij	September 24, 1976	Nauchnij	N. S. Chernykh	3:2 · SHU	30 km (19 mi)	MPC · JPL
3924 Birch	1977 CU	Birch	February 11, 1977	Palomar	E. Bowell, C. T. Kowal	·	17 km (11 mi)	MPC · JPL
3925 Tretʹyakov	1977 SS_{2}	Tretʹyakov	September 19, 1977	Nauchnij	L. V. Zhuravleva	·	51 km (32 mi)	MPC · JPL
3926 Ramirez	1978 VQ_{3}	Ramirez	November 7, 1978	Palomar	E. F. Helin, S. J. Bus	·	3.9 km (2.4 mi)	MPC · JPL
3927 Feliciaplatt	1981 JA_{2}	Feliciaplatt	May 5, 1981	Palomar	C. S. Shoemaker, E. M. Shoemaker	·	4.0 km (2.5 mi)	MPC · JPL
3928 Randa	1981 PG	Randa	August 4, 1981	Zimmerwald	P. Wild	·	5.7 km (3.5 mi)	MPC · JPL
3929 Carmelmaria	1981 WG_{9}	Carmelmaria	November 16, 1981	Perth Observatory	Jekabsons, P.	·	6.0 km (3.7 mi)	MPC · JPL
3930 Vasilev	1982 UV_{10}	Vasilev	October 25, 1982	Nauchnij	L. V. Zhuravleva	THM	18 km (11 mi)	MPC · JPL
3931 Batten	1984 EN	Batten	March 1, 1984	Anderson Mesa	E. Bowell	·	3.1 km (1.9 mi)	MPC · JPL
3932 Edshay	1984 SC_{5}	Edshay	September 27, 1984	Palomar	Nolan, M. C., C. S. Shoemaker	·	12 km (7.5 mi)	MPC · JPL
3933 Portugal	1986 EN_{4}	Portugal	March 12, 1986	La Silla	R. M. West	THM	15 km (9.3 mi)	MPC · JPL
3934 Tove	1987 DF_{1}	Tove	February 23, 1987	Brorfelde	P. Jensen, K. Augustesen, Fogh Olsen, H. J.	EUN	8.1 km (5.0 mi)	MPC · JPL
3935 Toatenmongakkai	1987 PB	Toatenmongakkai	August 14, 1987	Geisei	T. Seki	slow	9.6 km (6.0 mi)	MPC · JPL
3936 Elst	2321 T-3	Elst	October 16, 1977	Palomar	C. J. van Houten, I. van Houten-Groeneveld, T. Gehrels	V	4.7 km (2.9 mi)	MPC · JPL
3937 Bretagnon	1932 EO	Bretagnon	March 14, 1932	Heidelberg	K. Reinmuth	EOS	16 km (9.9 mi)	MPC · JPL
3938 Chapront	1949 PL	Chapront	August 2, 1949	Heidelberg	K. Reinmuth	·	9.8 km (6.1 mi)	MPC · JPL
3939 Huruhata	1953 GO	Huruhata	April 7, 1953	Heidelberg	K. Reinmuth	·	31 km (19 mi)	MPC · JPL
3940 Larion	1973 FE_{1}	Larion	March 27, 1973	Nauchnij	L. V. Zhuravleva	H	5.1 km (3.2 mi)	MPC · JPL
3941 Haydn	1973 UU_{5}	Haydn	October 27, 1973	Tautenburg Observatory	F. Börngen	KOR	6.0 km (3.7 mi)	MPC · JPL
3942 Churivannia	1977 RH_{7}	Churivannia	September 11, 1977	Nauchnij	N. S. Chernykh	·	7.1 km (4.4 mi)	MPC · JPL
3943 Silbermann	1981 RG_{1}	Silbermann	September 3, 1981	Tautenburg Observatory	F. Börngen	(2076)	5.6 km (3.5 mi)	MPC · JPL
3944 Halliday	1981 WP_{1}	Halliday	November 24, 1981	Anderson Mesa	E. Bowell	V	5.9 km (3.7 mi)	MPC · JPL
3945 Gerasimenko	1982 PL	Gerasimenko	August 14, 1982	Nauchnij	N. S. Chernykh	slow	21 km (13 mi)	MPC · JPL
3946 Shor	1983 EL_{2}	Shor	March 5, 1983	Nauchnij	L. G. Karachkina	THM	17 km (11 mi)	MPC · JPL
3947 Swedenborg	1983 XD	Swedenborg	December 1, 1983	Anderson Mesa	E. Bowell	·	16 km (9.9 mi)	MPC · JPL
3948 Bohr	1985 RF	Bohr	September 15, 1985	Brorfelde	P. Jensen	·	5.1 km (3.2 mi)	MPC · JPL
3949 Mach	1985 UL	Mach	October 20, 1985	Kleť	A. Mrkos	·	5.7 km (3.5 mi)	MPC · JPL
3950 Yoshida	1986 CH	Yoshida	February 8, 1986	Karasuyama	S. Inoda, T. Urata	EOS	10 km (6.2 mi)	MPC · JPL
3951 Zichichi	1986 CK_{1}	Zichichi	February 13, 1986	Bologna	San Vittore	moon	6.7 km (4.2 mi)	MPC · JPL
3952 Russellmark	1986 EM_{2}	Russellmark	March 14, 1986	Smolyan	Bulgarian National Observatory	NYS	4.7 km (2.9 mi)	MPC · JPL
3953 Perth	1986 VB_{6}	Perth	November 6, 1986	Anderson Mesa	E. Bowell	·	4.8 km (3.0 mi)	MPC · JPL
3954 Mendelssohn	1987 HU	Mendelssohn	April 24, 1987	Tautenburg Observatory	F. Börngen	·	3.2 km (2.0 mi)	MPC · JPL
3955 Bruckner	1988 RF_{3}	Bruckner	September 9, 1988	Tautenburg Observatory	F. Börngen	EOS	18 km (11 mi)	MPC · JPL
3956 Caspar	1988 VL_{1}	Caspar	November 3, 1988	Brorfelde	P. Jensen	·	5.4 km (3.4 mi)	MPC · JPL
3957 Sugie	1933 OD	Sugie	July 24, 1933	Heidelberg	K. Reinmuth	·	23 km (14 mi)	MPC · JPL
3958 Komendantov	1953 TC	Komendantov	October 10, 1953	Crimea-Simeis	P. F. Shajn	·	6.1 km (3.8 mi)	MPC · JPL
3959 Irwin	1954 UN_{2}	Irwin	October 28, 1954	Brooklyn	Indiana University	moon	4.1 km (2.5 mi)	MPC · JPL
3960 Chaliubieju	1955 BG	Chaliubieju	January 20, 1955	Nanking	Purple Mountain	·	9.0 km (5.6 mi)	MPC · JPL
3961 Arthurcox	1962 OB	Arthurcox	July 31, 1962	Brooklyn	Indiana University	EUN	10 km (6.2 mi)	MPC · JPL
3962 Valyaev	1967 CC	Valyaev	February 8, 1967	Nauchnij	T. M. Smirnova	THM	16 km (9.9 mi)	MPC · JPL
3963 Paradzhanov	1969 TP_{2}	Paradzhanov	October 8, 1969	Nauchnij	L. I. Chernykh	NYS	5.8 km (3.6 mi)	MPC · JPL
3964 Danilevskij	1974 RG_{1}	Danilevskij	September 12, 1974	Nauchnij	L. V. Zhuravleva	GEF	6.0 km (3.7 mi)	MPC · JPL
3965 Konopleva	1975 VA_{9}	Konopleva	November 8, 1975	Nauchnij	N. S. Chernykh	EUN	9.5 km (5.9 mi)	MPC · JPL
3966 Cherednichenko	1976 SD_{3}	Cherednichenko	September 24, 1976	Nauchnij	N. S. Chernykh	·	21 km (13 mi)	MPC · JPL
3967 Shekhtelia	1976 YW_{2}	Shekhtelia	December 16, 1976	Nauchnij	L. I. Chernykh	URS	29 km (18 mi)	MPC · JPL
3968 Koptelov	1978 TU_{5}	Koptelov	October 8, 1978	Nauchnij	L. I. Chernykh	V	5.1 km (3.2 mi)	MPC · JPL
3969 Rossi	1978 TQ_{8}	Rossi	October 9, 1978	Nauchnij	L. V. Zhuravleva	moon	3.9 km (2.4 mi)	MPC · JPL
3970 Herrán	1979 ME_{9}	Herrán	June 28, 1979	Cerro El Roble	C. Torres	MAR	8.6 km (5.3 mi)	MPC · JPL
3971 Voronikhin	1979 YM_{8}	Voronikhin	December 23, 1979	Nauchnij	L. V. Zhuravleva	·	32 km (20 mi)	MPC · JPL
3972 Richard	1981 JD_{3}	Richard	May 6, 1981	Palomar	C. S. Shoemaker	·	4.1 km (2.5 mi)	MPC · JPL
3973 Ogilvie	1981 UC_{1}	Ogilvie	October 30, 1981	Socorro	Taff, L. G.	·	6.2 km (3.9 mi)	MPC · JPL
3974 Verveer	1982 FS	Verveer	March 28, 1982	Anderson Mesa	E. Bowell	EUN	8.3 km (5.2 mi)	MPC · JPL
3975 Verdi	1982 UR_{3}	Verdi	October 19, 1982	Tautenburg Observatory	F. Börngen	KOR	9.7 km (6.0 mi)	MPC · JPL
3976 Lise	1983 JM	Lise	May 6, 1983	Anderson Mesa	N. G. Thomas	·	29 km (18 mi)	MPC · JPL
3977 Maxine	1983 LM	Maxine	June 14, 1983	Palomar	C. S. Shoemaker, E. M. Shoemaker	EUN	10 km (6.2 mi)	MPC · JPL
3978 Klepešta	1983 VP_{1}	Klepešta	November 7, 1983	Kleť	Z. Vávrová	·	29 km (18 mi)	MPC · JPL
3979 Brorsen	1983 VV_{1}	Brorsen	November 8, 1983	Kleť	A. Mrkos	·	19 km (12 mi)	MPC · JPL
3980 Hviezdoslav	1983 XU	Hviezdoslav	December 4, 1983	Kleť	A. Mrkos	THM ·	11 km (6.8 mi)	MPC · JPL
3981 Stodola	1984 BL	Stodola	January 26, 1984	Kleť	A. Mrkos	THM · slow?	22 km (14 mi)	MPC · JPL
3982 Kastelʹ	1984 JP_{1}	Kastelʹ	May 2, 1984	Nauchnij	L. G. Karachkina	moon	6.8 km (4.2 mi)	MPC · JPL
3983 Sakiko	1984 SX	Sakiko	September 20, 1984	Kleť	A. Mrkos	·	16 km (9.9 mi)	MPC · JPL
3984 Chacos	1984 SB_{6}	Chacos	September 21, 1984	La Silla	H. Debehogne	·	7.6 km (4.7 mi)	MPC · JPL
3985 Raybatson	1985 CX	Raybatson	February 12, 1985	Palomar	C. S. Shoemaker	BRA	20 km (12 mi)	MPC · JPL
3986 Rozhkovskij	1985 SF_{2}	Rozhkovskij	September 19, 1985	Nauchnij	N. S. Chernykh	·	6.8 km (4.2 mi)	MPC · JPL
3987 Wujek	1986 EL_{1}	Wujek	March 5, 1986	Anderson Mesa	E. Bowell	·	14 km (8.7 mi)	MPC · JPL
3988 Huma	1986 LA	Huma	June 4, 1986	Palomar	E. F. Helin	AMO +1 km (0.62 mi)	700 m (2,300 ft)	MPC · JPL
3989 Odin	1986 RM	Odin	September 8, 1986	Brorfelde	P. Jensen	·	3.8 km (2.4 mi)	MPC · JPL
3990 Heimdal	1987 SO_{3}	Heimdal	September 25, 1987	Brorfelde	P. Jensen	T_{j} (2.99) · HIL · 3:2	36 km (22 mi)	MPC · JPL
3991 Basilevsky	1987 SW_{3}	Basilevsky	September 26, 1987	Anderson Mesa	E. Bowell	·	5.6 km (3.5 mi)	MPC · JPL
3992 Wagner	1987 SA_{7}	Wagner	September 29, 1987	Tautenburg Observatory	F. Börngen	EOS	17 km (11 mi)	MPC · JPL
3993 Šorm	1988 VV_{5}	Šorm	November 4, 1988	Kleť	A. Mrkos	·	8.4 km (5.2 mi)	MPC · JPL
3994 Ayashi	1988 XF	Ayashi	December 2, 1988	Ayashi Station	M. Koishikawa	·	14 km (8.7 mi)	MPC · JPL
3995 Sakaino	1988 XM	Sakaino	December 5, 1988	Chiyoda	T. Kojima	·	9.5 km (5.9 mi)	MPC · JPL
3996 Fugaku	1988 XG_{1}	Fugaku	December 5, 1988	Yorii	M. Arai, H. Mori	·	5.2 km (3.2 mi)	MPC · JPL
3997 Taga	1988 XP_{1}	Taga	December 6, 1988	Dynic	A. Sugie	NYS ·	9.6 km (6.0 mi)	MPC · JPL
3998 Tezuka	1989 AB	Tezuka	January 1, 1989	Chiyoda	T. Kojima	·	6.9 km (4.3 mi)	MPC · JPL
3999 Aristarchus	1989 AL	Aristarchus	January 5, 1989	Chiyoda	T. Kojima	·	18 km (11 mi)	MPC · JPL
4000 Hipparchus	1989 AV	Hipparchus	January 4, 1989	Kushiro	S. Ueda, H. Kaneda	(5)	17 km (11 mi)	MPC · JPL

back to top

== See also ==
- Meanings of minor-planet names: 3001–4000
