= Hoffmeister =

Hoffmeister is a German surname. Notable people with the surname include:

- Adolf Hoffmeister (1902–1973), Czechoslovak artist
- Bert Hoffmeister (1907–1999), Canadian Army officer, businessman, and conservationist
- Cuno Hoffmeister (1892–1968), German astronomer and geophysicist
- Edmund Hoffmeister (1893–1951), German army officer, Generalleutnant
- Florian Hoffmeister (born 1970), German cinematographer and director
- Frank Hoffmeister (born 1965), German swimmer
- Frank Hoffmeister (lawyer), German lawyer
- Franz Hoffmeister (1898–1943), German Roman Catholic priest
- Franz Anton Hoffmeister (1754–1812), German and Austrian composer and music publisher
- Freya Hoffmeister (born 1964), German expeditioner and sea-kayaker
- Gunhild Hoffmeister (born 1944), East German-German runner
- Hans Hoffmeister (1901–1980), German discus thrower
- Hans Hoffmeister (water polo) (1936–2016), German water polo player
- Jesse Hoffmeister (1872–1933), American baseball player
- Katy Hoffmeister (born 1973), German politician
- Peter Brown Hoffmeister, American author and rock climber
- Robert J. Hoffmeister, American deaf education academic
- Sven Hoffmeister (born 1970), German footballer
- Werner Hoffmeister (1819–1845), German physician and botanist

== See also ==
- 1726 Hoffmeister, main-belt asteroid
- Hoffmeister (crater), lunar crater
- Hoffmeister Quartet, string quartet composed by Wolfgang Amadeus Mozart

== See also ==
- Hofmeister (surname)
