= Ahnert =

Ahnert may refer to:

== Other ==
- 3181 Ahnert, an asteroid

== People ==
- Paul Oswald Ahnert (1897–1989), German astronomer
- Eva Ahnert-Rohlfs, German astronomer
- Heinrich-Wilhelm Ahnert (1915–1942), German World War II fighter pilot
