= Hofmeister =

Hofmeister may refer to:

- Hofmeister (surname)
- Schlomo Hofmeister, Rabbi
- Hofmeister (office), medieval and early modern court position
- Hofmeister Lager, a UK lager brand
- Friedrich Hofmeister Musikverlag, German music publisher, short: Hofmeister
- Hofmeister series, a classification of ions in order of their ability to salt out or salt in proteins

== See also ==
- Hoffmeister, a surname
