= Eva Ahnert-Rohlfs =

German astronomer (1912–1954)

- Born: 11 August 1912; Coburg, Saxe-Coburg-Gotha, German Empire
- Died: 9 March 1954 (aged 41); Sonneberg, East Germany
- Education: University of Würzburg, Ludwig-Maximilians-Universität München; Kiel University; University of Göttingen
- Occupation: Astronomer
- Known for: variable stars

Eva Ahnert-Rohlfs (11 August 1912 – 9 March 1954) was a German astronomer. She made key observations of variable stars.

Eva Ahnert-Rohlfs was born in Coburg (Duchy Saxe-Coburg-Gotha). She studied at the University of Würzburg, the Ludwig-Maximilians-Universität München, and Kiel University, from 1931 to 1933. After nine years of withdrawal into family life, she studied from 1942 until the end of the Second World War at the University of Göttingen. From 1945, she worked closely with professor Cuno Hoffmeister as an assistant astronomer at the Sonneberg Observatory. In 1951, she received a doctorate in astrophysics at the University of Jena. At Sonneberg Observatory Eva Rohlfs met the astronomer Paul Oswald Ahnert and they were married in 1952.

From the Sonneberg observatory she made important observations of the variable stars that he detailed in the article "On the structure and origin of the Perseid current" (German: Zur Struktur und Entstehung des Perseidenstroms) included in the Observatory Publications Sonneberg Astronomical.

Eva Ahnert-Rohlfs died at the age of 41 in Sonneberg.

== Bibliography ==
- "Strahlungsdruck, Poynting-Robertson-Effekt und interstellare Materie." Mitteilung der Sternwarte Sonneberg 43 (1953)
- "Vorläufige Mitteilung über Versuche zum Nachweis von Meteoritischem Staub." Mitteilung der Sternwarte Sonneberg 45 (1954)
- "Zur Struktur der Entstehung des Perseidenstroms." Veröffentlichung der Sternwarte Sonneberg (part 2, pp. 5–38) (1956)

== Obituaries ==
- AN 281 (1954) 284 (one sentence)
- Cuno Hoffmeister: "Eva Ahnert-Rohlfs" (Die Sterne issue 5/6, 1954, pp. 103–105)
