= Euskirchen – Rhein-Erft-Kreis II =

Federal electoral district of Germany

91 Euskirchen – Rhein-Erft-Kreis II
- Electoral district for the Bundestag
- Euskirchen – Rhein-Erft-Kreis II in 2025
- State: North Rhine-Westphalia
- Population: 324,100 (2019)
- Electorate: 249,198 (2021)
- Major settlements: Euskirchen; Erftstadt; Brühl (Rhineland)
- Area: 1,428.1 km^{2}

Current electoral district
- Created: 1949
- Party: CDU
- Member: Detlef Seif
- Elected: 2009, 2013, 2017, 2021, 2025

Euskirchen – Rhein-Erft-Kreis II is an electoral constituency (German: Wahlkreis) represented in the Bundestag. It elects one member via first-past-the-post voting. Under the current constituency numbering system, it is designated as constituency 91. It is located in southwestern North Rhine-Westphalia, comprising the Euskirchen district and part of the Rhein-Erft-Kreis district.

Euskirchen – Rhein-Erft-Kreis II was created for the inaugural 1949 federal election. Since 2009, it has been represented by Detlef Seif of the Christian Democratic Union (CDU).

== Geography ==
Euskirchen – Rhein-Erft-Kreis II is located in southwestern North Rhine-Westphalia. As of the 2021 federal election, it comprises the entirety of the Euskirchen district as well as the municipalities of Brühl, Erftstadt, and Wesseling from the Rhein-Erft-Kreis district.

== History ==
Euskirchen – Rhein-Erft-Kreis II was created in 1949, then known as Bergheim – Euskirchen. In the 1953 through 1961 elections, it was named Bergheim (Erft) – Euskirchen. In the 1965 through 1972 elections, it was named Bergheim (Erft). In the 1976 election, it was named Erftkreis II. In the 1980 through 2009 elections, it was named Euskirchen – Erftkreis II. It acquired its current name in the 2013 election. In the 1949 election, it was North Rhine-Westphalia constituency 5 in the numbering system. In the 1953 through 1961 elections, it was number 64. From 1965 through 1976, it was number 57. From 1980 through 1998, it was number 58. From 2002 through 2009, it was number 93. In the 2013 through 2021 elections, it was number 92. From the 2025 election, it has been number 91.

Originally, the constituency comprised the districts of Euskirchen and Bergheim (Erft). In the 1976 election, it comprised the district of Euskirchen and the municipalities of Erftstadt, Bergheim, and Kerpen from the Erftkreis district. It acquired its current borders in the 1980 election. The Erftkreis district was renamed Rhein-Erft-Kreis in 2003, but the constituency's borders did not change.

Election	No.	Name	Borders
1949	5	Bergheim – Euskirchen	Euskirchen district; Bergheim (Erft) district
1953	64	Bergheim (Erft) – Euskirchen	Euskirchen district; Bergheim (Erft) district
1957	64	Bergheim (Erft) – Euskirchen	Euskirchen district; Bergheim (Erft) district
1961	64	Bergheim (Erft) – Euskirchen	Euskirchen district; Bergheim (Erft) district
1965	57	Bergheim (Erft)	Euskirchen district; Bergheim (Erft) district
1969	57	Bergheim (Erft)	Euskirchen district; Bergheim (Erft) district
1972	57	Bergheim (Erft)	Euskirchen district; Bergheim (Erft) district
1976	57	Erftkreis II	Euskirchen district; Erftkreis district (only Erftstadt, Bergheim, and Kerpen municipalities)
1980	58	Euskirchen – Erftkreis II	Euskirchen district; Erftkreis district (only Brühl, Erftstadt, and Wesseling municipalities)
1983	58	Euskirchen – Erftkreis II	Euskirchen district; Erftkreis district (only Brühl, Erftstadt, and Wesseling municipalities)
1987	58	Euskirchen – Erftkreis II	Euskirchen district; Erftkreis district (only Brühl, Erftstadt, and Wesseling municipalities)
1990	58	Euskirchen – Erftkreis II	Euskirchen district; Erftkreis district (only Brühl, Erftstadt, and Wesseling municipalities)
1994	58	Euskirchen – Erftkreis II	Euskirchen district; Erftkreis district (only Brühl, Erftstadt, and Wesseling municipalities)
1998	58	Euskirchen – Erftkreis II	Euskirchen district; Erftkreis district (only Brühl, Erftstadt, and Wesseling municipalities)
2002	93	Euskirchen – Erftkreis II	Euskirchen district; Erftkreis district (only Brühl, Erftstadt, and Wesseling municipalities)
2005	93	Euskirchen – Erftkreis II	Euskirchen district; Rhein-Erft-Kreis district (only Brühl, Erftstadt, and Wesseling municipalities)
2009	93	Euskirchen – Erftkreis II	Euskirchen district; Rhein-Erft-Kreis district (only Brühl, Erftstadt, and Wesseling municipalities)
2013	92	Euskirchen – Rhein-Erft-Kreis II	Euskirchen district; Rhein-Erft-Kreis district (only Brühl, Erftstadt, and Wesseling municipalities)
2017	92	Euskirchen – Rhein-Erft-Kreis II	Euskirchen district; Rhein-Erft-Kreis district (only Brühl, Erftstadt, and Wesseling municipalities)
2021	92	Euskirchen – Rhein-Erft-Kreis II	Euskirchen district; Rhein-Erft-Kreis district (only Brühl, Erftstadt, and Wesseling municipalities)
2025	91	Euskirchen – Rhein-Erft-Kreis II	Euskirchen district; Rhein-Erft-Kreis district (only Brühl, Erftstadt, and Wesseling municipalities)

== Members ==
The constituency has been held continuously by the Christian Democratic Union (CDU) since its creation. It was first held by Johannes Even from 1949 to 1965, followed by Hans Verbeek and Karl Gatzen each for a single term. Peter Milz was elected in 1972 and served until 1987. Wolf Bauer then served until 2009. Detlief Sief was elected in 2009, and re-elected in 2013, 2017, 2021 and 2025.

Election	Member	Party	%
1949	Johannes Even	CDU	47.8
1953	Johannes Even	CDU	56.3
1957	Johannes Even	CDU	61.7
1961	Johannes Even	CDU	57.0
1965	Hans Verbeek	CDU	56.0
1969	Karl Gatzen	CDU	48.5
1972	Peter Milz	CDU	48.8
1976	Peter Milz	CDU	50.5
1980	Peter Milz	CDU	49.6
1983	Peter Milz	CDU	55.4
1987	Wolf Bauer	CDU	50.8
1990	Wolf Bauer	CDU	47.5
1994	Wolf Bauer	CDU	48.0
1998	Wolf Bauer	CDU	46.8
2002	Wolf Bauer	CDU	44.9
2005	Wolf Bauer	CDU	46.3
2009	Detlef Seif	CDU	43.6
2013	Detlef Seif	CDU	50.9
2017	Detlef Seif	CDU	42.8
2021	Detlef Seif	CDU	34.6
2025	Detlef Seif	CDU	38.4

== Election results ==
=== 2025 election ===
Federal election (2025): Euskirchen – Rhein-Erft-Kreis II
Notes:	Blue background denotes the winner of the electorate vote. Pink background denotes a candidate elected from their party list. Yellow background denotes an electorate win by a list member, or other incumbent. A ✓ or ✗ denotes status of any incumbent, win or lose respectively.						
Party	Candidate	Votes	%	±%	Party votes	%	±%
CDU	✓ Detlef Seif	78,883	38.4	▲3.8	69,739	33.8	▲3.4
SPD	Andrea Kanonenberg	42,467	20.7	▼6.0	36,497	17.7	▼9.02
AfD	Rüdiger Lucassen	37,837	18.4	▲10.5	37,881	18.4	▲10.6
Greens	Christian Schubert	19,549	9.5	▼3.6	22,512	10.9	▼2.8
Left	Georg Riemann	11,457	5.6	▲3.0	12,960	6.3	▲3.3
FDP	Markus Herbrand	8,498	4.1	▼6.2	9,905	4.8	▼7.4
BSW					8,171	4.0	
FW	Thomas Wiza	2,886	1.4	0.0	1,437	0.7	▼0.2
Volt	Fabio Centorbi	2,858	1.4		1,416	0.7	▲0.4
Tierschutzpartei					2,814	1.4	▼0.1
BD	Markus Hausmann	1,084	0.5		476	0.2	
PARTEI				▼1.4	1,028	0.5	▼0.4
dieBasis				▼1.3	595	0.3	▼0.9
PdF					373	0.2	▲0.1
Team Todenhöfer					334	0.2	▼0.2
Values					135	0.1	
MERA25					61	0.0	
MLPD					34	0.0	0.0
Pirates				▼0.6			▼0.4
Gesundheitsforschung							▼0.1
Humanists							▼0.1
ÖDP							▼0.1
Bündnis C							0.0
SGP						0.0	0.0
Informal votes		2,114			1,265		
Total valid votes		205,519			206,368		
Turnout		207,633	83.5	▲6.1			
CDU hold	Majority	36,416	17.7				

=== 2021 election ===
Federal election (2021): Euskirchen – Rhein-Erft-Kreis II
Notes:	Blue background denotes the winner of the electorate vote. Pink background denotes a candidate elected from their party list. Yellow background denotes an electorate win by a list member, or other incumbent. A ✓ or ✗ denotes status of any incumbent, win or lose respectively.						
Party	Candidate	Votes	%	±%	Party votes	%	±%
CDU	✓ Detlef Seif	65,981	34.6	▼8.3	58,081	30.4	▼5.4
SPD	Dagmar Andres	50,892	26.7	▲0.5	50,949	26.6	▲3.3
Greens	Marion Sand	25,005	13.1	▲7.3	26,161	13.7	▲7.0
FDP	Markus Herbrand	19,805	10.4	▲0.5	23,314	12.2	▼2.5
AfD	Rüdiger Lucassen	14,999	7.9	▼1.6	14,894	7.8	▼2.1
Left	Stefan Söhngen	4,993	2.6	▼3.2	5,730	3.0	▼3.1
Tierschutzpartei					2,828	1.5	▲0.6
FW	Jörg Esser	2,724	1.4		1,628	0.9	▲0.5
PARTEI	Jan-Luis Wolter	2,690	1.4		1,631	0.9	▲0.2
dieBasis	Paulo Jesus Pinto	2,505	1.3		2,187	1.1	
Pirates	Stefano Tuchsherer	1,189	0.6		825	0.4	▲0.1
Team Todenhöfer					740	0.4	
Volt					584	0.3	
LIEBE					290	0.2	
Gesundheitsforschung					271	0.1	0.0
LfK					238	0.1	
NPD					150	0.1	▼0.2
Humanists					138	0.1	0.0
ÖDP					133	0.1	0.0
V-Partei3					132	0.1	0.0
Bündnis C					95	0.1	
du.					87	0.0	
PdF					72	0.0	
LKR					52	0.0	
DKP					23	0.0	0.0
MLPD					22	0.0	0.0
SGP					19	0.0	0.0
Informal votes		2,031			1,540		
Total valid votes		190,783			191,274		
Turnout		192,814	77.4	▲1.3			
CDU hold	Majority	15,089	7.9	▼8.8			

=== 2017 election ===
Federal election (2017): Euskirchen – Rhein-Erft-Kreis II
Notes:	Blue background denotes the winner of the electorate vote. Pink background denotes a candidate elected from their party list. Yellow background denotes an electorate win by a list member, or other incumbent. A ✓ or ✗ denotes status of any incumbent, win or lose respectively.						
Party	Candidate	Votes	%	±%	Party votes	%	±%
CDU	✓ Detlef Seif	79,493	42.8	▼8.1	66,503	35.7	▼9.3
SPD	Ute Meiers	48,592	26.2	▼4.6	43,498	23.4	▼3.4
FDP	Markus Herbrand	18,316	9.9	▲6.4	27,410	14.7	▲8.1
AfD	Rüdiger Lucassen	17,650	9.5		18,325	9.8	▲5.7
Left	Susanne Schütze-Lülsdorf	10,835	5.8	▲1.2	11,403	6.1	▲1.0
Greens	Hans-Werner Ignatowitz	10,689	5.8	0.0	12,447	6.7	▼0.5
Tierschutzpartei					1,707	0.9	
PARTEI					1,256	0.7	▲0.2
Pirates					666	0.4	▼1.8
FW					607	0.3	0.0
NPD					452	0.2	▼0.7
AD-DEMOKRATEN					304	0.2	
Volksabstimmung					219	0.1	▼0.2
V-Partei³					217	0.1	
BGE					213	0.1	
DiB					206	0.1	
Gesundheitsforschung					205	0.1	
DM					200	0.1	
ÖDP					175	0.1	0.0
Die Humanisten					89	0.0	
MLPD					55	0.0	0.0
DKP					27	0.0	
SGP					12	0.0	0.0
Informal votes		2,221			1,600		
Total valid votes		185,575			186,196		
Turnout		187,796	76.1	▲3.4			
CDU hold	Majority	30,901	16.6	▼3.5			

=== 2013 election ===
Federal election (2013): Euskirchen – Rhein-Erft-Kreis II
Notes:	Blue background denotes the winner of the electorate vote. Pink background denotes a candidate elected from their party list. Yellow background denotes an electorate win by a list member, or other incumbent. A ✓ or ✗ denotes status of any incumbent, win or lose respectively.						
Party	Candidate	Votes	%	±%	Party votes	%	±%
CDU	✓ Detlef Seif	88,759	50.9	▲7.3	79,055	45.1	▲8.4
SPD	Helga Kühn-Mengel	53,703	30.8	▲1.8	46,982	26.8	▲3.3
Greens	Jörg Kutzer	10,066	5.8	▼1.3	12,544	7.1	▼1.6
Left	Florian Völlger	8,166	4.7	▼2.1	9,075	5.2	▼2.4
FDP	Gabi Molitor	6,101	3.5	▼8.4	11,611	6.6	▼11.8
Pirates	Thomas Winzberg	4,894	2.8		3,826	2.2	▲0.7
AfD					7,183	4.1	
NPD	Christiane Jütten	2,589	1.5	▲0.1	1,702	1.0	▼0.1
PARTEI					762	0.4	
FW					576	0.3	
PRO					489	0.3	
Volksabstimmung					473	0.3	▲0.1
Nichtwahler					277	0.2	
ÖDP					213	0.1	0.0
Party of Reason					210	0.1	
REP					191	0.1	▼0.1
BIG					96	0.1	
RRP					94	0.1	▼0.1
MLPD					35	0.0	0.0
PSG					33	0.0	0.0
BüSo					24	0.0	0.0
Die Rechte					20	0.0	
Informal votes		3,940			2,747		
Total valid votes		174,278			175,471		
Turnout		178,218	72.7	▲0.9			
CDU hold	Majority	35,056	20.1	▲5.5			

=== 2009 election ===
Federal election (2009): Euskirchen – Rhein-Erft-Kreis II
Notes:	Blue background denotes the winner of the electorate vote. Pink background denotes a candidate elected from their party list. Yellow background denotes an electorate win by a list member, or other incumbent. A ✓ or ✗ denotes status of any incumbent, win or lose respectively.						
Party	Candidate	Votes	%	±%	Party votes	%	±%
CDU	Detlef Seif	75,290	43.6	▼2.7	63,653	36.7	▼0.8
SPD	Helga Kühn-Mengel	50,035	29.0	▼10.3	40,709	23.5	▼11.4
FDP	Gabi Molitor	20,620	11.9	▲6.4	32,011	18.5	▲5.2
Greens	Dorothee Kroll	12,239	7.1	▲3.5	15,126	8.7	▲1.8
Left	Anita Heinemeyer	11,679	6.8	▲2.8	13,139	7.6	▲2.9
Pirates					2,523	1.5	
NPD	René Rothhanns	2,321	1.3	▲0.3	1,810	1.0	▲0.2
Tierschutzpartei					1,276	0.7	▲0.2
FAMILIE					931	0.5	▲0.1
RENTNER					844	0.5	
Independent	Jürgen Theo Schmitz	464	0.3				
REP					420	0.2	▼0.1
RRP					326	0.2	
Volksabstimmung					209	0.1	0.0
ÖDP					160	0.1	
DVU					146	0.1	
Centre					104	0.1	0.0
MLPD					43	0.0	0.0
BüSo					40	0.0	0.0
PSG					24	0.0	0.0
Informal votes		3,421			2,576		
Total valid votes		172,648			173,493		
Turnout		176,069	71.8	▼6.6			
CDU hold	Majority	25,255	14.6	▲7.6			

=== 2005 election ===
Federal election (2005): Euskirchen – Erftkreis II
Notes:	Blue background denotes the winner of the electorate vote. Pink background denotes a candidate elected from their party list. Yellow background denotes an electorate win by a list member, or other incumbent. A ✓ or ✗ denotes status of any incumbent, win or lose respectively.						
Party	Candidate	Votes	%	±%	Party votes	%	±%
CDU	✓ Wolf Bauer	86,515	46.3	▲1.4	70,202	37.5	▼3.4
SPD	Helga Kühn-Mengel	73,415	39.3	▼0.9	65,444	34.9	▼2.1
FDP	Gabi Molitor	10,419	5.6	▼3.6	24,766	13.2	▲2.2
Left	Michael Faber	7,349	3.9	▲2.8	8,751	4.7	▲3.7
Greens	Arvid Bell	6,774	3.6	▼1.2	12,973	6.9	▼1.1
NPD					1,553	0.8	▲0.6
Tierschutzpartei					1,007	0.5	▲0.2
Familie					845	0.5	▲0.2
Independent	Naci Sahin	650	0.3				
GRAUEN					710	0.4	▲0.2
REP					602	0.3	
PBC					152	0.1	
From Now on... Democracy Through Referendum					177	0.1	
Socialist Equality Party					101	0.1	
Centre					79	0.0	
BüSo					54	0.0	
MLPD					31	0.0	0.0
Informal votes		3,442			2,984		
Total valid votes		186,989			187,447		
Turnout		190,431	78.3	▼2.1			
CDU hold	Majority	13,100	7.00				
