= 1726 Hoffmeister =

Asteroid

Discovery
- Discovered by: K. Reinmuth
- Discovery site: Heidelberg Obs.
- Discovery date: 24 July 1933

Designations
- Named after: Cuno Hoffmeister (German astronomer)
- Alternative designations: 1933 OE · 1955 FC; 1955 HX · 1957 WD; A924 UA
- Minor planet category: main-belt · (middle); Hoffmeister

Orbital characteristics
- Epoch 4 September 2017 (JD 2458000.5)
- Uncertainty parameter 0
- Observation arc: 91.85 yr (33,547 days)
- Aphelion: 2.9051 AU
- Perihelion: 2.6702 AU
- Semi-major axis: 2.7877 AU
- Eccentricity: 0.0421
- Orbital period (sidereal): 4.65 yr (1,700 days)
- Mean anomaly: 42.063°
- Mean motion: 0° 12^{m} 42.48^{s} / day
- Inclination: 3.4833°
- Longitude of ascending node: 230.97°
- Argument of perihelion: 69.026°

Physical characteristics
- Dimensions: 17.35 km (calculated); 22.03±5.39; 22.52±0.23 km 24.61±0.52; 25.250±0.079 km 25.438±0.118 km 25.67±8.37
- Synodic rotation period: 11.7058±0.0056 h
- Geometric albedo: 0.03±0.03; 0.0360±0.0066; 0.037±0.005; 0.042±0.006; 0.044±0.002; 0.05±0.05; 0.057 (assumed)
- Spectral type: SMASS = Cb · C
- Absolute magnitude (H): 12.082±0.002 (R) · 12.10 · 12.26 · 12.2 · 12.3 · 12.53 · 12.54±0.24

1726 Hoffmeister, provisional designation 1933 OE, is a carbonaceous asteroid and namesake of the Hoffmeister family from the central region of the asteroid belt, approximately 23 kilometers in diameter.

It was discovered on 24 July 1933, by German astronomer Karl Reinmuth at Heidelberg Observatory in southwest Germany, and named after astronomer Cuno Hoffmeister.

== Orbit and classification ==
Hoffmeister is the namesake and lowest-numbered member of the very compact Hoffmeister family (519), which, based upon its low albedo, was most likely formed from the breakup of a 50–100 kilometer-sized, carbon-rich parent body within the past several hundred million years.

It orbits the Sun in the central main-belt at a distance of 2.7–2.9 AU once every 4 years and 8 months (1,700 days; semi-major axis of 2.79 AU). Its orbit has an eccentricity of 0.04 and an inclination of 3° with respect to the ecliptic. It was first identified as 1924 UA at the Yerkes Observatory in 1924, extending the asteroid's observation arc by 9 years prior to its official discovery observation at Heidelberg.

== Physical characteristics ==
In the SMASS classification, Hoffmeister is characterized as a Cb-type, a subtype of the carbonaceous C-complex.

=== Diameter and albedo ===
According to the surveys carried out by the Japanese Akari satellite and NASA's Wide-field Infrared Survey Explorer with its subsequent NEOWISE mission, Hoffmeister measures between 22.03 and 25.67 kilometers in diameter, and its surface has a low albedo between 0.03 and 0.05. The Collaborative Asteroid Lightcurve Link assumes a standard albedo for carbonaceous asteroids of 0.057 and calculates a diameter of 17.4 kilometers with an absolute magnitude of 12.53.

=== Rotational lightcurve ===
In December 2009, a rotational lightcurve of Hoffmeister was obtained from photometric observations by astronomers at the Palomar Transient Factory in California. It gave a rotation period of 11.7058±0.0056 hours with a brightness variation of 0.40 magnitude (U=2).

== Naming ==
This minor planet was named in memory of German astronomer Cuno Hoffmeister (1892–1968), who founded the Sonneberg Observatory in 1925, and became one of its directors (see 1039 Sonneberga). Hoffmeister discovered thousands of variable stars, co-discovered comet C/1959 O1, thoroughly investigated a large number of meteors, and discovered 5 minor planets: 2183 Neufang, 3203 Huth, 3674 Erbisbühl, 4183 Cuno (which was later named after him) and 4724 Brocken. The lunar crater Hoffmeister was also named in his honor. The official naming citation was published by the Minor Planet Center on 20 February 1976 (M.P.C. 3933).
