= Vernadsky =

Vernadsky, Vernadskiy and Vernadskij may refer to:

- Vladimir Vernadsky (1863–1945), mineralogist and geochemist
  - 2809 Vernadskij, minor planet
  - Vernadskiy (crater), lunar crater
  - Vernadsky National Library of Ukraine
  - Vernadsky Research Base, a Ukrainian Antarctic research station
- George Vernadsky (1887–1973), historian
