= 3674 Erbisbühl =

Mars-crossing asteroid

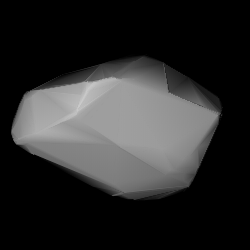
- Shape model of Erbisbühl from its lightcurve

Discovery
- Discovered by: C. Hoffmeister
- Discovery site: Sonneberg Obs.
- Discovery date: 13 September 1963

Designations
- Named after: Mount Erbisbühl (Eastern Germany)
- Alternative designations: 1963 RH · 1970 OD; 1986 AA
- Minor planet category: Mars-crosser main-belt (inner)

Orbital characteristics
- Epoch 4 September 2017 (JD 2458000.5)
- Uncertainty parameter 0
- Observation arc: 52.80 yr (19,285 days)
- Aphelion: 3.2468 AU
- Perihelion: 1.4723 AU
- Semi-major axis: 2.3596 AU
- Eccentricity: 0.3760
- Orbital period (sidereal): 3.62 yr (1,324 days)
- Mean anomaly: 306.42°
- Mean motion: 0° 16^{m} 18.84^{s} / day
- Inclination: 21.029°
- Longitude of ascending node: 296.85°
- Argument of perihelion: 98.240°
- Mars MOID: 0.1997 AU

Physical characteristics
- Mean diameter: 9.068±1.623 km 10.32±0.71 km
- Synodic rotation period: 11.28±0.01 h (Note: Lightcurve plot of (3674) Erbisbuhl, Robert Koff, Antelope Hills Observatory (H09). Summary figures at LCDB)
- Geometric albedo: 0.249±0.037; 0.309±0.126
- Spectral type: SMASS = Sk
- Absolute magnitude (H): 12.0 · 12.10

3674 Erbisbühl (prov. designation: 1963 RH) is an stony asteroid and one of the largest Mars-crossers from the innermost regions of the asteroid belt, approximately 11 kilometers (6.8 miles) in diameter. It was discovered on 13 September 1963, by German astronomer Cuno Hoffmeister at his Sonneberg Observatory on Mount Erbisbühl in Eastern Germany.

== Orbit and classification ==
Erbisbühl orbits the Sun in the inner main-belt at a distance of 1.5–3.2 AU once every 3 years and 7 months (1,324 days). Its orbit has an eccentricity of 0.38 and an inclination of 21° with respect to the ecliptic. The body's observation arc starts in 1963, as no precoveries were taken and no identifications were made prior to its official discovery.

== Naming ==
This minor planet was named for Mount Erbisbühl on which the discovering Sonneberg Observatory is located (also see 1039 Sonneberga). Cuno Hoffmeister, discoverer of this asteroid and founder of the observatory, lived and worked at Erbisbühl for many decades. The official naming citation was published by the Minor Planet Center on 2 February 1988 (M.P.C. 12809).

== Physical characteristics ==
In the SMASS taxonomic scheme, Erbisbühl is a stony S-type asteroid, characterized as a Sk-subtype, a transitional form to the uncommon K-type asteroid.

=== Lightcurve ===
A rotational lightcurve for this asteroid was obtained from photometric observations made at the U.S. Antelope Hills Observatory in December 2003. It rendered a rotation period of 11.28±0.01 hours with a brightness variation of 0.40 in magnitude (U=3).

=== Diameter and albedo ===
According to the survey carried out by the Japanese Akari satellite, Erbisbühl has a high albedo of 0.25 with a corresponding diameter of 10.3 kilometers, while the NEOWISE mission gives a diameter of 9.1 kilometers and an albedo of 0.31. TheCollaborative Asteroid Lightcurve Link assumes a standard albedo for stony asteroids of 0.20 and calculates a diameter of 11.8 kilometers.
