= 1039 Sonneberga =

Asteroid

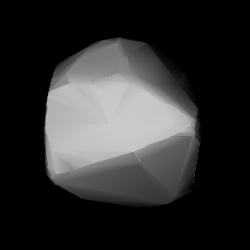
- Shape model of Sonneberga from its lightcurve

Discovery
- Discovered by: M. F. Wolf
- Discovery site: Heidelberg Obs.
- Discovery date: 24 November 1924

Designations
- Named after: Sonneberg (German city and its local observatory)
- Alternative designations: 1924 TL · 1942 XG; 1984 OK
- Minor planet category: main-belt · (middle)

Orbital characteristics
- Epoch 4 September 2017 (JD 2458000.5)
- Uncertainty parameter 0
- Observation arc: 92.34 yr (33,728 days)
- Aphelion: 2.8387 AU
- Perihelion: 2.5213 AU
- Semi-major axis: 2.6800 AU
- Eccentricity: 0.0592
- Orbital period (sidereal): 4.39 yr (1,603 days)
- Mean anomaly: 281.23°
- Mean motion: 0° 13^{m} 28.56^{s} / day
- Inclination: 4.5557°
- Longitude of ascending node: 221.73°
- Argument of perihelion: 327.56°

Physical characteristics
- Dimensions: 30.17±8.55 km 33.853±0.294 km 33.919±0.128 km 33.99±0.72 km 34.32±7.47 km 36.60 km (derived); 36.70±1.4 km
- Synodic rotation period: 34.2±0.03 h
- Geometric albedo: 0.0331 (derived); 0.042±0.009; 0.0430±0.0081; 0.0476±0.004; 0.05±0.02; 0.05±0.03; 0.053±0.005; 0.059±0.003
- Spectral type: SMASS = X · P · C
- Absolute magnitude (H): 11.1 · 11.40 · 11.47±0.27 · 11.5 · 11.59

1039 Sonneberga, provisional designation 1924 TL, is a dark background asteroid, approximately 30 kilometers (19 miles) in diameter, located in the central region of the asteroid belt. It was discovered on 24 November 1924, by German astronomer Max Wolf at Heidelberg Observatory in southwest Germany. The asteroid was named for the German city of Sonneberg, where the Sonneberg Observatory is located.

== Orbit and classification ==
Sonneberga orbits the Sun in the central main-belt at a distance of 2.5–2.8 AU once every 4 years and 5 months (1,603 days). Its orbit has an eccentricity of 0.06 and an inclination of 5° with respect to the ecliptic. The body's observation arc begins with its official discovery observation, as no precoveries were taken, and no prior identifications were made.

== Naming ==
This minor planet was named for the city of Sonneberg, Thuringia in Germany and location of the Sonneberg Observatory. It was founded in 1925 by astronomer Cuno Hoffmeister after whom the minor planets 1726 Hoffmeister and 4183 Cuno are named. The official naming citation was also mentioned in The Names of the Minor Planets by Paul Herget in 1955 (H 99).

== Physical characteristics ==
In the SMASS classification, Sonneberga is an X-type asteroid. It has also been characterized as a very dark P-type asteroid by NASA's Wide-field Infrared Survey Explorer.

=== Rotation period ===
In March 2005, a rotational lightcurve of Sonneberga was obtained by French amateur astronomer Laurent Bernasconi. Lightcurve analysis gave a longer-than average rotation period of 34.2 hours with a brightness variation of 0.41 magnitude (U=2).

=== Diameter and albedo ===
According to the surveys carried out by the Infrared Astronomical Satellite IRAS, the Japanese Akari satellite, and the NEOWISE mission of the WISE space-telescope, Sonneberga measures between 30.17 and 36.70 kilometers in diameter, and its surface has an albedo between 0.042 and 0.059. The Collaborative Asteroid Lightcurve Link derived an albedo of 0.033 and a diameter of 36.60 kilometers using an absolute magnitude of 11.5.
