= Paul Oswald Ahnert =

German astronomer (1897–1989)

Paul Oswald Ahnert (22 November 1897 – 27 February 1989) was a German astronomer. He first became famous in Germany for publishing the "Kalender für Sternfreunde" from 1948 until 1988, an annual calendar of astronomical events. The minor planet 3181 Ahnert is named in his honor.

Ahnert was born in Chemnitz, Kingdom of Saxony. During the First World War he served as an ordinary German field-soldier. After the war he became a member of the Social Democratic Party of Germany (SPD) and was a committed opponent of the rise of militarism and right wing revanchism in Germany. Between 1919 and 1933 he worked as an elementary school teacher. In addition to this he was an ambitious amateur astronomer and in 1923 his first article was published in the scientific journal Astronomische Nachrichten (AN 219 (1923), 165–170). He reported about long period variables he had observed from his private observatory.

When Adolf Hitler became Chancellor in 1933 the Nazi regime removed Paul Ahnert from his post. He was arrested and imprisoned for a few months in a concentration camp. Released from imprisonment he had to earn his living by doing occasional jobs. But in 1938 he had a lucky escape for his real profession. Cuno Hoffmeister invited him to the Sonneberg Observatory, where he worked during the Second World War as a computer (performing calculations) and assistant observer in a long term sky patrol and field survey program.

After the war he met the astronomer Eva Rohlfs at Sonneberg Observatory and married her in 1952. His second marriage lasted only two years, because Eva died in 1954 in age of 41. During the 1950s Paul Ahnert advanced from an assistant observer to an astronomer with international reputation, who made important observations of variable stars and solar activity.

He received an honorary doctor in astrophysics at the University of Jena in 1957. His name became well known in Germany, when he started to edit the "Kalender für Sternfreunde", an annual calendar of astronomical events. The first volume was printed in 1949. Paul Ahnert edited it for over 40 years until he retired from this task, aged 90, and passed the work to younger hands. Paul Ahnert died in age of 91 in Sonneberg (Free State Thuringia).

== Bibliography ==
- Die veränderlichen Sterne der nördlichen Milchstraße. Part 4. (with C. Hoffmeister) Veröffentlichungen der Sternwarte zu Sonneberg (1947)
- Der Lichtwechsel von 46 hellen Mirasternen., Akademie-Verlag, Berlin (1954)
- Astronomisch-chronologische Tafeln für Sonne, Mond und Planeten., J. A. Barth Verlag, Leipzig (1960, 1961, 1965)
- Beobachtungsobjekte für Liebhaberastronomen., J. A. Barth Verlag, Leipzig (1961 a. 1968)
- Mondkarte in 25 Sektionen. (with W. G. Lohrmann and others), J. A. Barth Verlag, Leipzig (1963)
- Astronomische Abhandlungen. (with C. Hoffmeister), J. A. Barth Verlag, Leipzig (1965)
- Kleine praktische Astronomie. Hilfstabellen und Beobachtungsobjekte. J. A. Barth Verlag, Leipzig (1986) ISBN 3-335-00000-5
- Kalender für Sternfreunde. Astronomisches Jahrbuch. (edit by P. Ahnert), J. A. Barth Verlag, Leipzig (Annual editions:1948-1988); continued as ...
  - Ahnerts Kalender für Sternfreunde. Astronomisches Jahrbuch. (edit by R. Luthardt), J. A. Barth Verlag, Leipzig (Five editions: 1989–1993)
  - Sonneberger Jahrbuch für Sternfreunde. (edit by Rainer Luthardt), Herri Deutsch Verlag, Frankfurt am Main (Six editions: 1994–2000); last Edition: Sonneberger Jahrbuch für Sternenfreunde. 2000. ISBN 3-8171-2000-1
  - Ahnerts Astronomisches Jahrbuch. Den Himmel beobachten und verstehen., Verlag Sterne und Weltraum, Heidelberg (Annual edition since 1994)
