= Almuth Beck =

German educator and politician (born 1940)

Almuth Beck (born 4 October 1940) is a German educator and politician (SED/PDS).

After reunification she became the first member of a German parliament (Landtag) to be deprived of her parliamentary mandate on account of activities as an Informal collaborator for the Ministry for State Security (Stasi) in what was, at that time, East Germany. This, and successful legal challenges touching on her case, attracted attention across the nation.

== Biography ==
Almuth Beck was born on 4 October 1940, in Sonneberg, a small and in some ways isolated town in the Thuringian hills to the south of Erfurt. When she was 4, World War II ended and the region found itself in the Soviet occupation zone, relaunched in October 1949 as the Soviet sponsored German Democratic Republic (East Germany). She passed her school final exams and went on to study between 1958 and 1962 at the University of Jena, during which time, in 1961, she married. She emerged qualified as a school teacher of History and German: between 1962 and 1965 she taught at the secondary school in Föritz (Sonneberg) where she was also a deputy school director. Between 1965 and 1990, she served as an advisor on labour law at the Education Department of the Sonneberg district council. Between 1970 and 1973, she completed a distance-learning study course at the Karl-Marx University (as it was then known) in Leipzig which resulted in a degree in Educational psychology.

In 1957, she became a member of the ruling Socialist Unity Party ("Sozialistische Einheitspartei Deutschlands" / SED) at a relatively young age. After 1990, it emerged from the work on Stasi files that in the context of her advisory work with the local education department she had signed a "Declaration of Duty" ("Verpflichtungserklärung") for the Ministry for State Security, although she denied this. In 1990, she took a teaching job at the school in Mengersgereuth-Hämmern, then working between 1992 and 1994 as an adult education teacher.

== Politics ==
Regional elections took place on the same day as the general election, on 16 October 1994. Nationally the result was not encouraging for the former SED which had been relaunched, formally at the end of 1989, as the Party of Democratic Socialism (PDS) as part of a broader relaunch intended to prepare for a democratic future. In the states that had been East Germany ("neuen Bundesländer") support for the PDS increased from the low-point of 1990, however, and in the regional election in Thuringia the party won nearly 17% of the votes cast, which translated into 17 seats in the 88 seat parliament ("Landtag"). (Under the German system parties receiving less than 5% of the overall vote receive no seats in the resulting parliament, which is why, for the PDS, 17% of the votes translated into more than 17% of the seats.) Beck was not one of those directly elected by a single electoral district ("constituency"), but her name was high enough up on the statewide party list submitted to the Thuringian voters for her to become one of 4 so-called "Direktmandaten" included in the 17 party representative elected as members of the parliament. In 1996, she became a member of the PDS regional party executive for Thuringia.

Under § 1 paragraph 2 of the Thuringia Law on parliamentary representation ("Thüringer Abgeordnetengesetz") of 7 February 1991 it was stipulated that members of parliament found to have collaborated with the Ministry for State Security should lose their seats. During the first electoral term, which had run until 1994, this had been agreed between the political parties who had together applied to the Stasi Records Agency for a set of appropriate rules. During the second electoral term, which ran from 1994 till 1999, the PDS reversed their position and rejected the all-party agreement. On 18 May 1995, in defiance of the majority decision by the parliament ("Landtag"), and also in defiance of the wishes of individual members, three PDS parliamentarians launched a successful legal challenge in the Thüringer constitutional court. The three were Ursula Fischer, Konrad Scheringer and Almuth Beck. The court decided that there was no legal basis for the provision. A rule placed in the parliament's regulations as this one had been was insufficient. The parliament then reinstated the regulation with what it believed was the necessary legal underpinnings. On 29 April 1999, the parliament, invoking § 8 of the Thuringia Law on parliamentary representation, withdrew the parliamentary mandate of Almuth Beck, citing actions that made her "unworthy to be a member of the parliament" ("unwürdig, dem Landtag anzugehören"). That decision gave rise to a formal legal complaint from the PDS group in the chamber. The complaint was successful. The constitutional court ruled that the legislation in question had fallen outside the regional parliament's constitutional competence.

The constitutional court did not involve itself in the actual issue of Almuth Beck's Stasi involvement. Having declared the law ineffective, the accuracy or otherwise of allegations arising from it was not an issue for consideration. Almuth Beck, having acknowledged that her signature appeared on the Stasi "Declaration of Duty" ("Verpflichtungserklärung"), maintained that it was nothing more than a confidentiality agreement signed in the context of her dealings with the country's "secret services". Besides that, she asserted "I did no one any harm" ("Ich habe niemandem geschadet"). Nevertheless, unsympathetic press reports indicate the existence of numerous instances documented in Stasi archives where information provided by Beck on colleagues and contacts, especially in the teaching profession, during her years as a Stasi informer, would have been sufficient to damage or end professional careers.

In the 1999 regional election the PDS increased the number of their seats to 21, becoming the second largest party in the chamber. Almuth Beck was not re-elected, however, and resigned from the chamber.
