= EE Pegasi =

Star in the constellation Pegasus

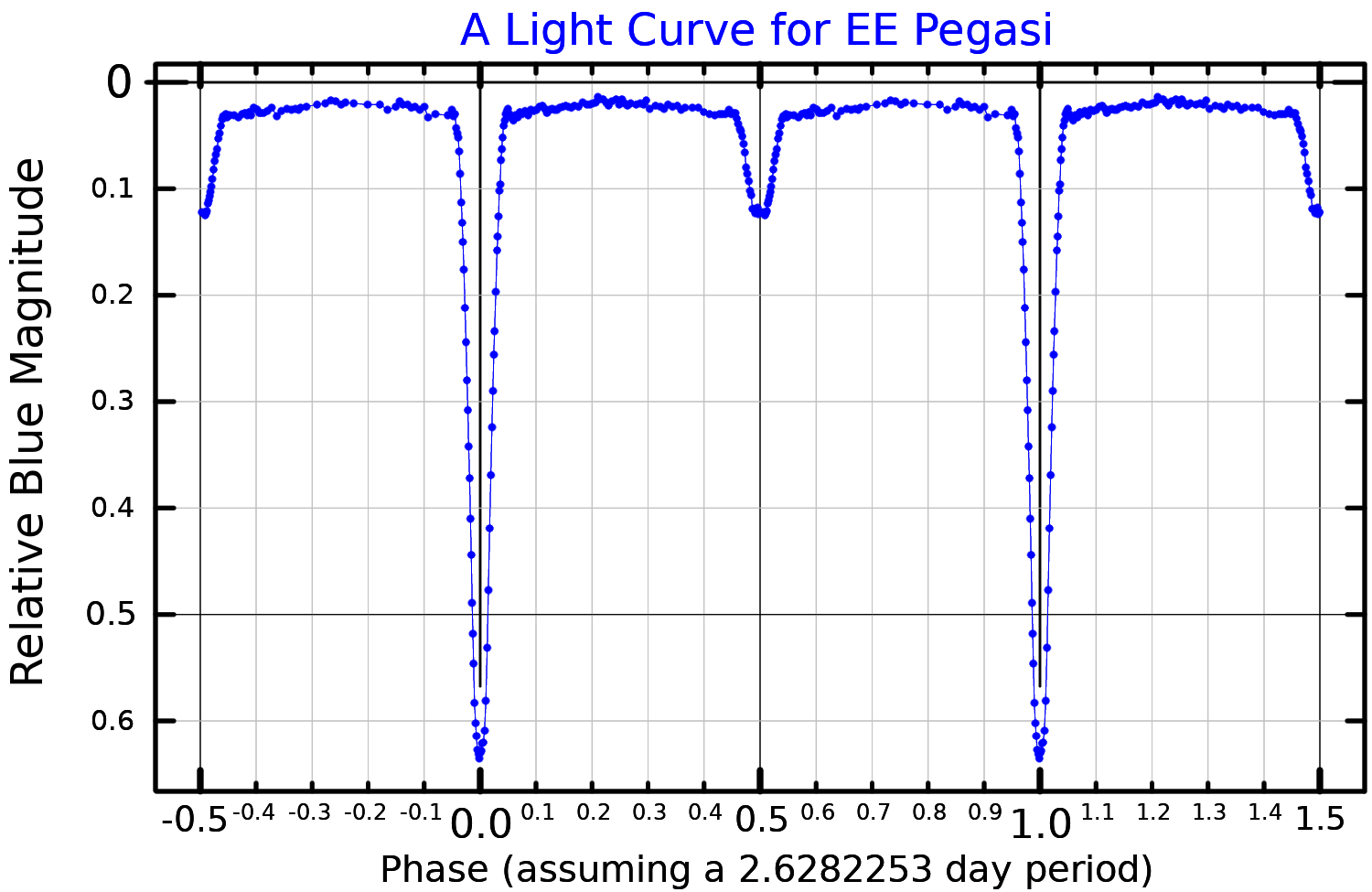
- A blue band light curve for EE Pegasi, plotted from data published by Ebbighausen (1971)

Observation data Epoch J2000.0 Equinox ICRS
- Constellation: Pegasus
- Right ascension: 21^{h} 40^{m} 01.87850^{s}
- Declination: +09° 11′ 05.1169″
- Apparent magnitude (V): 6.96 (7.09 + 9.40)

Characteristics

A
- Spectral type: A3m
- B−V color index: 0.120±0.018

B
- Spectral type: F5V
- B−V color index: 0.44±0.05

Astrometry
Radial velocity (R_{v})	−22.6 km/s
Proper motion (μ)	RA: +41.237 mas/yr Dec.: +13.723 mas/yr
Parallax (π)	6.9143±0.0658 mas
Distance	472 ± 4 ly (145 ± 1 pc)
Absolute magnitude (M_{V})	0.50

Orbit
Primary	AB
Name	C
Period (P)	2,628 d
Eccentricity (e)	0.52±0.11
Inclination (i)	88.6°
Periastron epoch (T)	2,443,120±24 JD
Argument of periastron (ω) (secondary)	−85±11°
Semi-amplitude (K_{1}) (primary)	4.4±0.6 km/s

Details

A
Mass	2.15±0.02 M_{☉}
Radius	2.09±0.03 R_{☉}
Luminosity	53.42 L_{☉}
Surface gravity (log g)	4.13±0.01 cgs
Rotational velocity (v sin i)	40.0±1.0 km/s
Age	300 Myr

B
Mass	1.33±0.01 M_{☉}
Radius	1.31±0.01 R_{☉}
Surface gravity (log g)	4.33±0.01 cgs
Rotational velocity (v sin i)	26.0±2.0 km/s

Other designations
- EE Peg, BD+08°4714, HD 206155, HIP 106981, SAO 126971

Database references
SIMBAD	data

EE Pegasi is a variable triple star system in the northern constellation Pegasus. It is too faint to be readily visible to the naked eye with a combined apparent visual magnitude of 6.96. The system is located at a distance of approximately 472 light years from the Sun based on Parallax, but is drifting closer with a radial velocity of −23 km/s.

This system was found to be an eclipsing binary by German astronomer Cuno Hoffmeister in 1935, and has since been the subject of multiple studies. The pair orbit each other closely with a period of 2.628 days. The magnitude 7.09 primary, component A, is an Am star with a stellar classification of A3m. It has more than double the mass and radius of the Sun. The secondary companion, component B, is an F-type main-sequence star with a class of F5V and a visual magnitude of 9.40. A third component is a smaller orange or red dwarf that orbits the main pair every 4.01 years.
