= 3181 Ahnert =

Asteroid

Discovery
- Discovered by: F. Börngen
- Discovery site: Karl Schwarzschild Obs.
- Discovery date: 8 March 1964

Designations
- Named after: Paul Ahnert (astronomer)
- Alternative designations: 1964 EC · 1932 RK; 1936 XJ · 1951 GC_{1} 1964 DE · 1975 NH_{1} 1975 RD · 1979 SC_{12} 1979 UO_{4} · 1979 WD_{8} 1979 WU_{1} · 1982 RE_{1}
- Minor planet category: main-belt · Flora

Orbital characteristics
- Epoch 4 September 2017 (JD 2458000.5)
- Uncertainty parameter 0
- Observation arc: 86.12 yr (31,454 days)
- Aphelion: 2.3743 AU
- Perihelion: 2.0840 AU
- Semi-major axis: 2.2292 AU
- Eccentricity: 0.0651
- Orbital period (sidereal): 3.33 yr (1,216 days)
- Mean anomaly: 9.5372°
- Mean motion: 0° 17^{m} 45.96^{s} / day
- Inclination: 3.9579°
- Longitude of ascending node: 221.14°
- Argument of perihelion: 304.92°

Physical characteristics
- Dimensions: 7.961±0.097; 8.19 km (calculated); 8.511±0.031 km 8.57±0.24 km
- Geometric albedo: 0.1856±0.0266; 0.216±0.019; 0.24 (assumed); 0.264±0.029
- Spectral type: SMASS = S · S
- Absolute magnitude (H): 12.40 · 12.6 · 12.8 · 12.98±0.06

3181 Ahnert, provisional designation 1964 EC, is a stony Flora asteroid from the inner regions of the asteroid belt, about 8 kilometers in diameter. It was discovered by German astronomer Freimut Börngen at the Karl Schwarzschild Observatory in Tautenburg, eastern Germany, on 8 March 1964.

== Orbit and classification ==
The S-type asteroid is a member of the Flora family, one of the largest groups of stony asteroids in the main-belt. It orbits the Sun in the inner main-belt at a distance of 2.1–2.4 AU once every 3 years and 4 months (1,216 days). Its orbit has an eccentricity of 0.07 and an inclination of 4° with respect to the ecliptic. The first precovery was obtained at Lowell Observatory in 1931, extending the asteroid's observation arc by 33 years prior to its discovery.

== Physical characteristics ==
According to the surveys carried out by NASA's space-based Wide-field Infrared Survey Explorer with its subsequent NEOWISE mission, the asteroid measures between 8.0 and 8.6 kilometers and its surface has an albedo between 0.19 and 0.26. The Collaborative Asteroid Lightcurve Link assumes an intermediate albedo of 0.24 – derived from 8 Flora, the largest member and namesake of this orbital family – and calculates a diameter of 8.2 kilometers. As of 2016, the asteroid's rotation period and shape still remain unknown.

== Naming ==
This minor planet was named after German astronomer Paul Ahnert (1897–1989), author of the annual calendar of astronomical events (German: Kalender für Sternfreunde) and a renowned astronomer among professionals and amateurs. His fields of research included the physics of the Solar System and periods of variable stars at the Sonneberg Observatory. (The minor planet 1039 Sonneberga is named after this observatory.) Publisher of several books on performing astronomical observations, he also popularized the subject of astronomy to the general public. The official naming citation was published by the Minor Planet Center on 2 July 1985 (M.P.C. 9771).
