= Ursula Fischer =

German former politician

Ursula Fischer (née Bätz; 6 September 1952 in Steinach) is a German former national politician (PDS).

In 1990, as a result of East Germany's first (and as matters turned out last) free and democratic national election, she was elected a member of the country's national parliament (Volkskammer). Following reunification, she was a member of the German Upper legislative assembly (Bundestag) between 1990 and 1994. She then pursued a career in regional politics before returning in 2004 to her earlier vocation as a physician.

== Life ==
Ursula Bätz was born in Steinach in the East German Bezirk Suhl, a small but long established town in the Thuringian Forest to the south of Erfurt, today administratively part of the district of Sonneberg. Her parents both worked in middle management, her father in the commerce sector and her mother in sales. She attended primary school locally between 1959 and 1967, moving on to secondary school ("Erweiterte Oberschule") in nearby Neuhaus am Rennweg.

Passing her school final exams (Abitur) in 1971 opened the way for university-level studies. Between 1971 and 1973 she studied medicine at the Karl Marx University (as it was known at the time) in Leipzig, moving on to the Erfurt Medical Academy from where she emerged with a degree in medicine in 1976, which was also the year in which she passed the national examination necessary to obtain her medical practicing certificate. In 1971, like many ambitious people, she had joined the country's ruling Socialist Unity Party ("Sozialistische Einheitspartei Deutschlands" / SED), but available sources covering this part of Ursula Fischer's career are otherwise silent on the subject of any political involvement. She then, till 1982, undertook specialist medical training in Pediatrics at Eisenach and Nordhausen. Following successful completion of this, between 1982 and 1990, apart from two years working abroad, she remained in Nordhausen, employed as a pediatrician.

In the General election of March 1990, Fischer was elected as one of the 66 PDS members of the national parliament (Volkskammer). She later recalled that she had not even been present at the party conference at which her name was placed on the party's candidate list, but she had participated in the round table discussions that took place in the run up to reunification, and assumed that she had been selected as a candidate because others had found her contributions memorable. Following reunification, which took place formally in October 1990, new elections were held in Germany. Under the system applied, the PDS (party) received only one seat based on its 2.4% share of the national vote, but they won a further 17 seats according to the regional vote, most of them in the "New Federal States" (former East Germany) where the party's overall vote share was 11.4%. Ursula Fischer was one of two elected Upper legislative assembly (Bundestag) candidates from the party list for the Thuringia electoral district. Within the chamber she was elected parliamentary leader of the PDS group.

She did not contest her Bundestag seat at the next national election, in 1994. Instead she successfully stood for election to the regional parliament (Landtag) in her home state of Thuringia. Five years later, when the PDS increased its share of the vote in the Thuringian regional election, she stood again. She sat as a member of the Landtag for ten years between 1994 and 2004. During this time she was also a member of the regional party executive in the Nordhausen district. Within the Landtag she was a member of the parliamentary committee on social affairs, family and health. However, in 2000 she was among those who resigned from the PDS, and at the subsequent election, which took place in 2004, she was no longer a candidate.
