= Wolf Bauer =

German politician (born 1939)

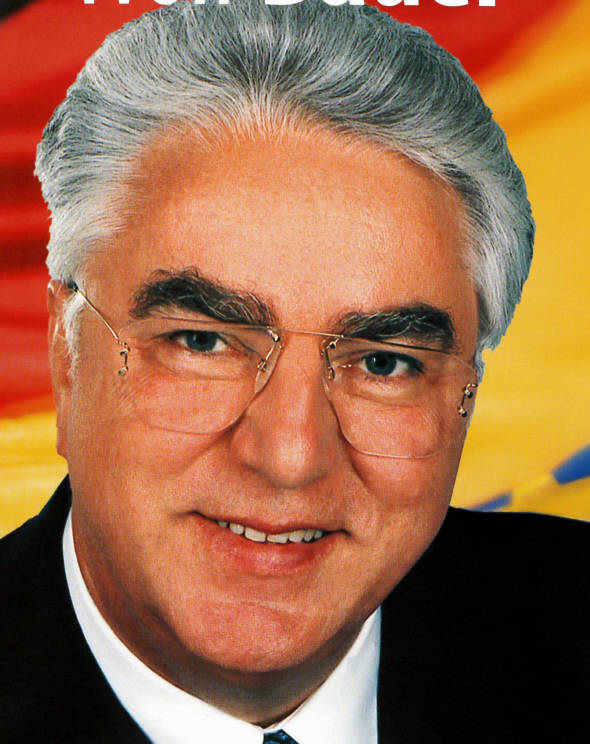
- Wolf Bauer's candidate poster for the 1998 federal election

Member of the Bundestag
- In office 18 February 1987 – 27 October 2009

Personal details
- Born: 5 March 1939 (age 87) Steinach, Thuringia, Germany
- Party: CDU

Wolf Bauer (born 5 March 1939 in Steinach, Thuringia) is a German politician and member of the conservative CDU. A pharmacist by profession, he was a member of the Bundestag from 1987 to 2009, representing Euskirchen – Rhein-Erft-Kreis II. Wolf Bauer is an honorary citizen of Astrakhan, Russia.

== See also ==
- List of German Christian Democratic Union politicians
