= Siedentopf (crater) =

Crater on the Moon

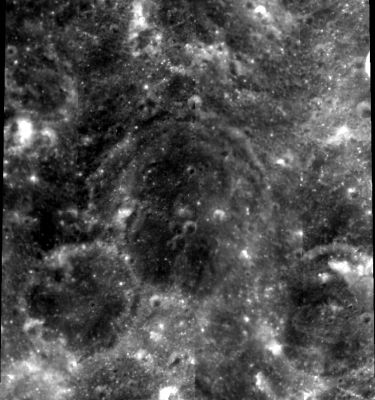
- Clementine mosaic
- Coordinates: 22.0°N 135.5°E
- Diameter: 61 km
- Depth: Unknown
- Colongitude: 226° at sunrise
- Eponym: Heinrich Siedentopf

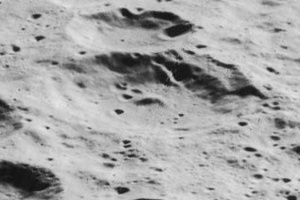
Oblique Lunar Orbiter 5 image

Siedentopf is a worn impact crater on the far side of the Moon. It lies to the east-southeast of the larger crater Vernadskiy. Farther to the south is Hoffmeister.

The northwestern section of the crater rim has been damaged, but the remainder of the rim is only moderately worn. The satellite crater Siedentopf Q intrudes into the rim along the southwestern side, and the rampart of this impact covers a portion of the interior floor of Siedentopf. The remainder of the floor is marked by some small craterlets.

== Satellite craters ==
By convention these features are identified on lunar maps by placing the letter on the side of the crater midpoint that is closest to Siedentopf.

Siedentopf	Latitude	Longitude	Diameter
F	22.1° N	138.5° E	42 km
G	20.5° N	138.4° E	61 km
H	20.9° N	137.2° E	42 km
M	19.0° N	135.5° E	31 km
Q	20.7° N	133.7° E	42 km
