= Crato Bütner =

German Baroque composer

Crato Bütner (Sonneberg, 1616–1679) was a German Baroque composer who was kantor and organist in Danzig (Polish: Gdańsk), first at the hospital church of St Salvator, then at Gdańsk's oldest church, St Catherine's. His collection of baroque works disappeared in 1945.

== Works, editions and recordings ==
=== Works ===
His works survive in manuscript in Stuttgart and in the Düben collection.

- songs in Georg Neumark's Lustwäldchen 1652, 1657
- songs in Johann Franck's Geistliche Sion
- Geistliche Konzerte, Hamburg 1651
- Psalm 147, Danzig 1661
- Te Deum a l2, Danzig 1662

=== Editions ===
- Edition: cantata Fürwahr, er trug unsere Krankheit
- Edition: Wollt Ihr wissen. Aria Sunamithica ... a voce sola con doi violini. Hofius.

=== Recordings ===
- Laudate Pueri Dominum Anna Jobrant, on Düben Delights Footprint 2009.
