= Steinach, Thuringia =

Steinach
- Town
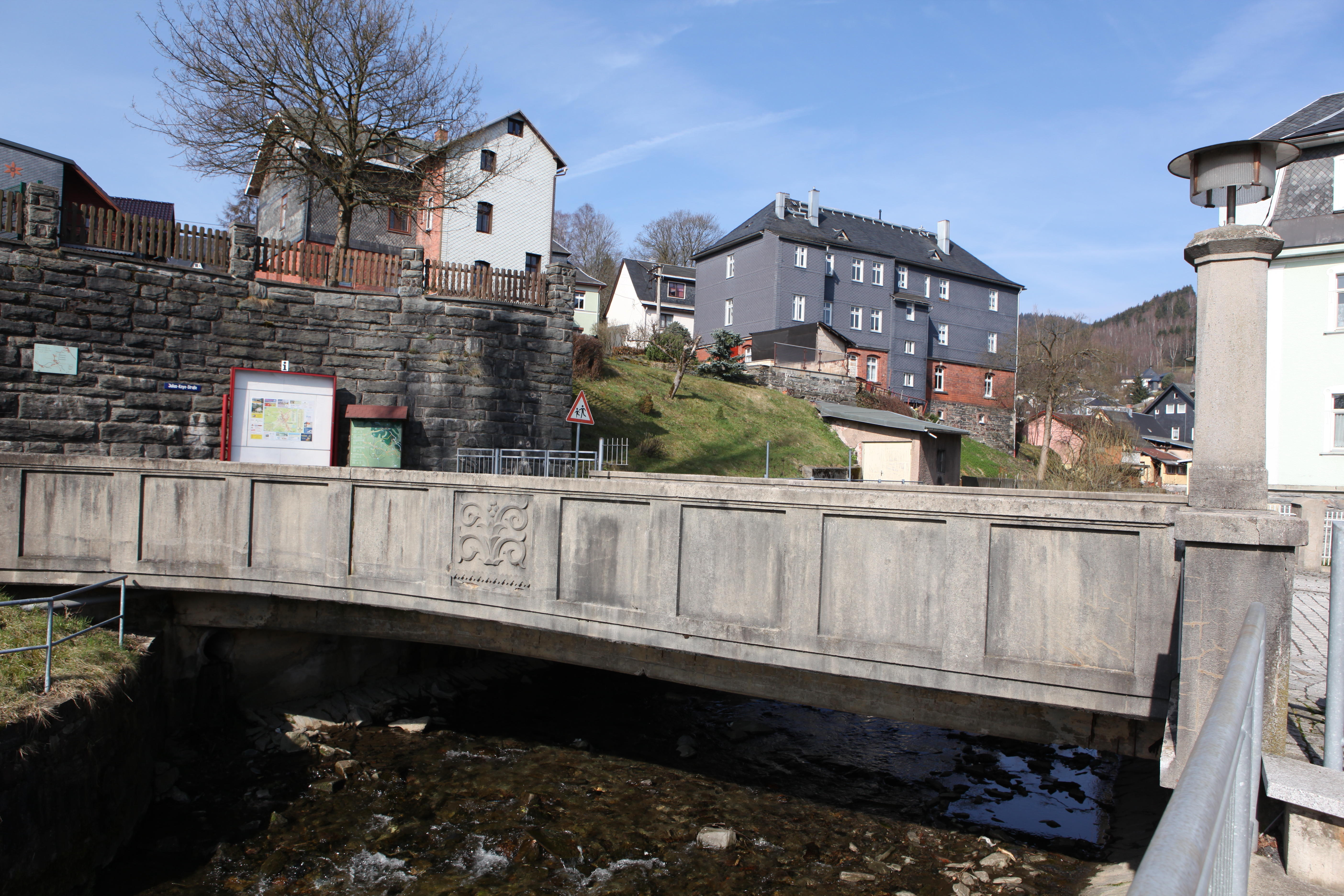
- Bridge across the Steinach River in Steinach seen in April 2012

- Coat of arms

- Location of Steinach within Sonneberg district
- Interactive map of Steinach
- Location within Germany Location within Thuringia
- Coordinates: 50°26′N 11°10′E
- Country: Germany
- State: Thuringia
- District: Sonneberg

Government
  - Mayor (2024–30): Udo Bätz

Area
  - Total: 26.35 km^{2} (10.17 sq mi)
- Elevation: 500 m (1,600 ft)

Population (2025-12-31)
  - Total: 3,456
  - Density: 131.2/km^{2} (339.7/sq mi)
- Time zone: UTC+01:00 (CET)
  - Summer (DST): UTC+02:00 (CEST)
- Postal codes: 96523
- Dialling codes: 036762
- Vehicle registration: SON, NH
- Website: www.steinach-thueringen.de

Steinach (German pronunciation: [ˈʃtaɪnax]) is a town in the district of Sonneberg, in Thuringia, Germany. It is situated in the Thuringian Forest, 12 km north of Sonneberg.

== People ==
- Wolf Bauer (born 1939), German politician (CDU)
- Horst Queck (1943–2025), German ski jumper
