= C/1959 O1 (Bester–Hoffmeister) =

Parabolic comet

Discovery
- Discovered by: Mike John Bester; Cuno Hoffmeister
- Discovery site: Bloemfontein, South Africa
- Discovery date: 26 July 1959

Designations
- Alternative designations: 1959 III, 1959d

Orbital characteristics
- Epoch: 11 July 1959 (JD 2436760.5)
- Observation arc: 101 days
- Earliest precovery date: 2 June 1959
- Number of observations: 29
- Perihelion: 1.251 AU
- Eccentricity: 1.002679
- Inclination: 12.832°
- Longitude of ascending node: 105.735°
- Argument of periapsis: 186.507°
- Last perihelion: 17 July 1959

Physical characteristics
- Mean radius: 0.41 km (0.25 mi) (Note: Calculated mean radius using the formula: $\log_{10}\,(\,R\,)\ =\;0.9 -\;0.13 (\,H\,)$ Where $\,H\,$ is the comet's absolute total magnitude (M1))
- Comet total magnitude (M1): 9.9
- Comet nuclear magnitude (M2): 14.9
- Apparent magnitude: 8.0 (1959 apparition)

Comet Bester–Hoffmeister, formally designated as C/1959 O1, is a faint non-periodic comet that was observed between June and September of 1959.

== Discovery and observations ==
The comet was discovered in photographic plates taken by South African astronomers, Mike John Bester and Cuno Hoffmeister, on the night of 26 July 1959. At the time, it was an 8th-magnitude object located within the constellation Ophiuchus. (Note: Reported initial position upon discovery was: α = 19^{h} 38.7^{m} , δ = –38° 49′) However, their findings were not reported until 17 August 1959 due to a communications error.

Subsequently, precovery images started to be found, with the earliest known observations taken from the Sonneberg Observatory between 2 and 5 June 1959. Further observations of the comet became increasingly difficult in the following days, where on 8 August, the comet faded to magnitude 10 as it moved towards the constellation of Microscopium.

The comet was last seen on 11 September 1959, when Hoffmeister spotted it as a 14th-magnitude object within the constellation Grus. (Note: Last known positions upon final observation were: α = 22^{h} 31.2^{m} , δ = –40° 19′)

== Orbit ==
Joachim Schubart and Brian G. Marsden computed the definitive orbital trajectory of the comet in 1961 and 1962, respectively. They have determined a weakly hyperbolic trajectory with a perihelion date of 17 July 1959, about nine days before discovery, with Marsden concluding that the comet's original orbit during its inbound flight is likely an ellipse.
