= Hoffmeister (crater) =

Crater on the Moon

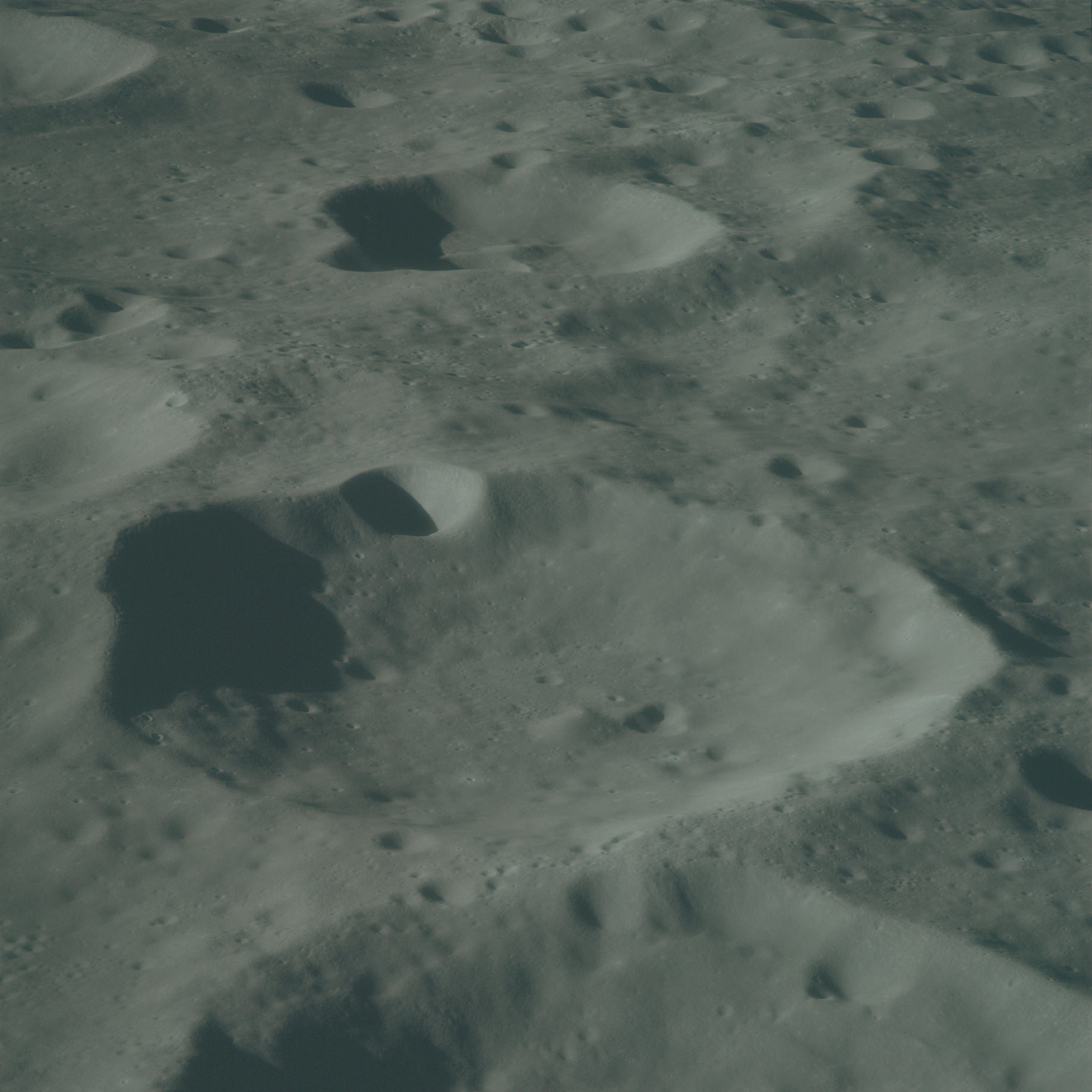
- The lunar crater Hoffmeister (below center) taken by Apollo 16 at 109 km altitude
- Coordinates: 15.2°N 136.9°E
- Diameter: 45 km
- Colongitude: 224° at sunrise
- Eponym: Cuno Hoffmeister

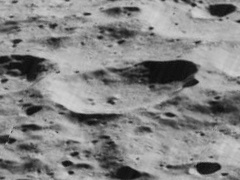
Oblique Lunar Orbiter 5 image

Hoffmeister is a lunar impact crater that is located on the Moon's far side, to the northwest of a huge walled plain named Mendeleev. Some distance to the north of Hoffmeister lies the crater Siedentopf, and to the west-northwest is Gavrilov.

This is a somewhat eroded crater with Hoffmeister N attached to the southern rim. A small crater with a high albedo lies along the common rim between Hoffmeister and this satellite. A small crater also lies along the northwestern rim of Hoffmeister. The interior floor of Hoffmeister is relatively featureless.

== Satellite craters ==
By convention these features are identified on lunar maps by placing the letter on the side of the crater midpoint that is closest to Hoffmeister.

Hoffmeister	Latitude	Longitude	Diameter
D	16.9° N	140.3° E	21 km
F	14.7° N	141.0° E	19 km
N	13.7° N	136.4° E	42 km
Z	17.8° N	136.7° E	29 km

== See also ==
- 1726 Hoffmeister, minor planet
