= Markus Herbrand =

German politician (born 1971)

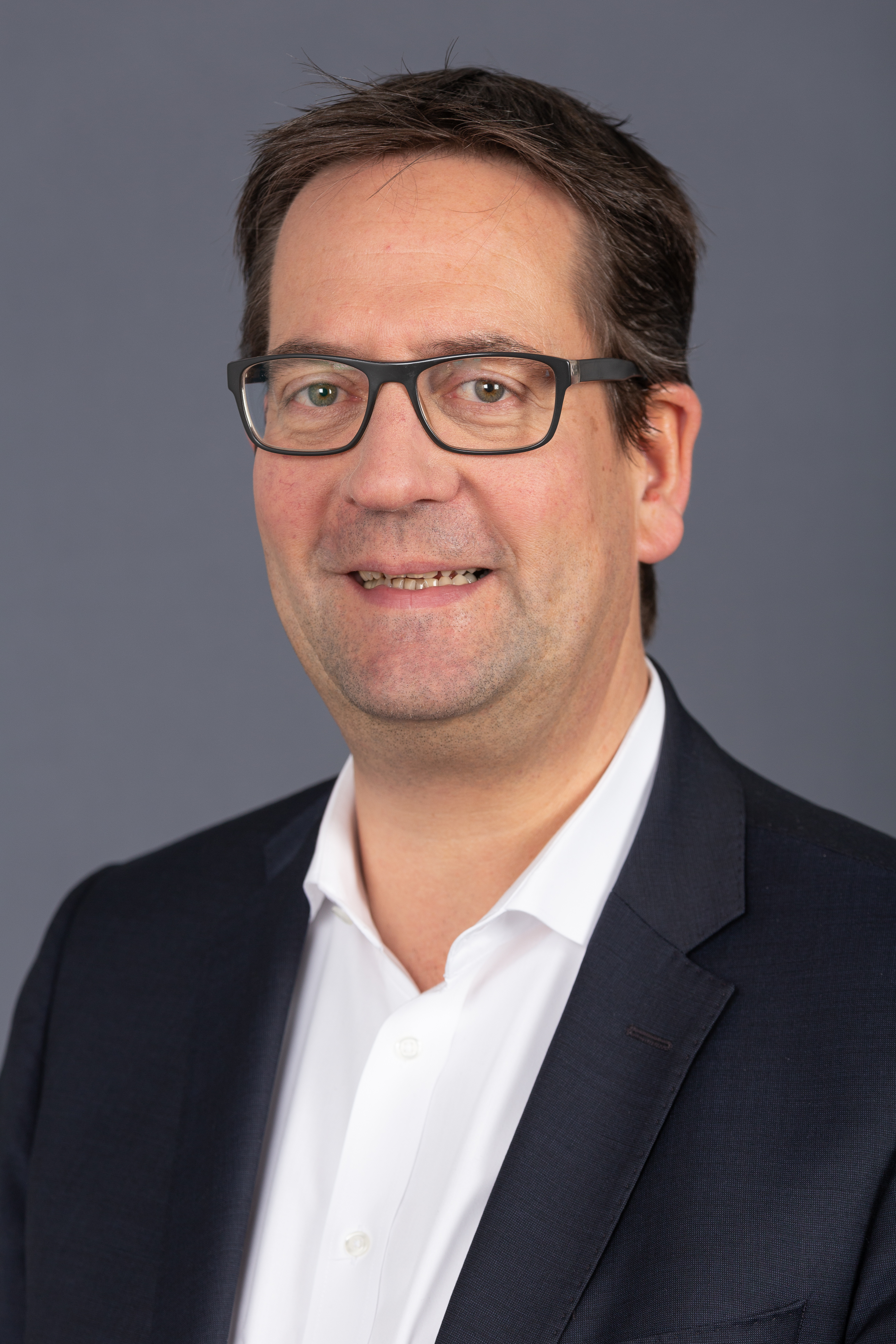
- Markus Herbrand in 2020

Member of the Bundestag
- Incumbent
- Assumed office 2017

Personal details
- Born: 24 February 1971 (age 55) Schleiden, West Germany
- Party: FDP
- Occupation: Tax consultant

Markus Herbrand (born 24 February 1971) is a German politician of the Free Democratic Party (FDP) who has been serving as a member of the Bundestag from the state of North Rhine-Westphalia since 2017, representing the Euskirchen – Rhein-Erft-Kreis II district.

== Early life and career ==
After seven years as an assistant tax consultant and auditing assistant, Herbrand passed the tax consultant examination in 1999. He has been practicing as a tax consultant in North Rhine-Westphalia.

== Political career ==
Herbrand joined the FDP in 2002. In the 2017 federal elections, Herbrand ran for the constituency of Euskirchen - Rhein-Erft-Kreis II and entered the German Bundestag via the state list of the FDP in NRW. In parliament, he is a member of the Finance Committee. In this capacity, he serves as his parliamentary group's rapporteur on measures against money laundering. Since the 2021 elections, he has been serving as his parliamentary group's spokesperson for financial policy.

== Other activities ==
- Federal Financial Supervisory Authority (BaFin), Member of the Administrative Council (since 2021)

== Personal life ==
Herbrand is married.
