= Sebastian Hofmeister =

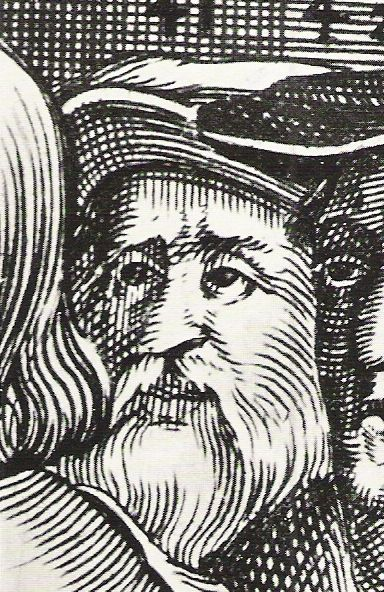
Sebastian Hofmeister

Sebastian Hofmeister (1476, Schaffhausen, Switzerland – June 26, 1533, Zofingen), known in writing as Oeconomus or Oikonomos, was a Swiss monk and religious Reformer who was prominent in early debates of the Reformation.

Hofmeister joined the Franciscan order in Schaffhausen before studying for several years in Paris. There he studied Hebrew and the classical languages and received a doctorate in theology in 1519. By 1520, he was sent to Zürich as a lecturer and later in the same year to Constance. It was in Zurich where he first met the Swiss Reformer Huldrych Zwingli, who influenced him a great deal. Hofmeister would begin preaching the Reformation at Lucerne, resulting in his expulsion from that town. He returned to Schaffhausen and became a central Reformer in the town, only to be thrown out in 1525. Although his time in Schaffhausen was brief, it is perhaps for this period that he is best known. He would find safety in Zürich where he established himself with the early Reformation debates there. This included the first disputation in Zürich on January 29, 1523, and the second from October 26 to 28, 1523, which he initially presided over. In Zürich, he would begin to preach by 1526, and by 1528 he left for Bern where he would teach Hebrew and participate in the Bern Disputation. He was involved in several anabaptist proceedings of the day. He continued to preach at several locations, including St. Gallen and Basel. Hoffmeister actually had a correspondence with Martin Luther, and wrote several works, including an autobiography.
