= Detlef Seif =

German politician

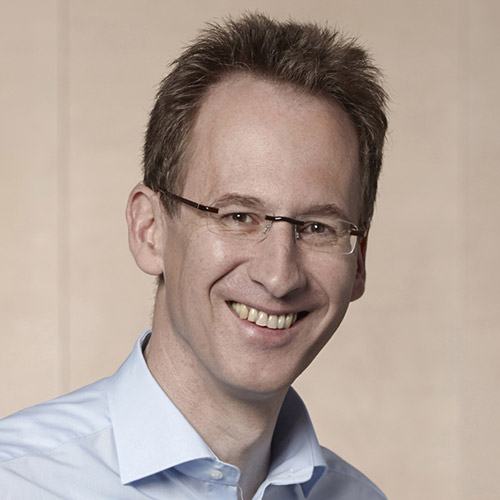

Member of the Bundestag
- Incumbent
- Assumed office 2009

Personal details
- Born: 15 August 1962 (age 64) Euskirchen, West Germany (now Germany)
- Party: Christian Democratic Union (CDU)
- Education: University of Bonn

Detlef Seif (born 15 August 1962 in Euskirchen) is a German politician of the Christian Democratic Union (CDU) who has been a Member of the German Bundestag since 2009. Since 2025, he has served as the CDU/CSU parliamentary group's representative for the European asylum and migration policy transformation and as the group's spokesperson (Obmann) on the Committee on Internal Affairs.

== Early life and career ==
On a scholarship of the Konrad Adenauer Foundation, Seif studied law at the University of Bonn from 1983 until 1989. During his studies, he worked for the International Society for Human Rights. Since 1993, he has been practicing as a lawyer.

== Political career ==
Seif joined the CDU in 1982 and held positions in local politics in Weilerswist from 1999 to 2009.

From 2009 to 2023, Seif has been CDU party chairman in the district of Euskirchen.

Seif has been a member of the German Bundestag since the 2009 federal elections. In the federal elections 2013, 2017, 2021 he won always the direct mandate of first votes; in 2025 he won again with 38.4%.

Since 2009, he has been a member of the Committee on European Affairs. In 2014 he became Deputy Spokesman for the committee. Seif's thematic areas of expertise in the committee are basic rights; EU citizenship; coordination between the judicature and police; border protection and counterterrorism; and asylum- and migration policy. Additionally, he is the CDU/CSU parliamentary group's rapporteur for Great Britain and Malta.

Between 2009 and 2017, Seif was a member of the Committee on Legal Affairs, where he served as his parliamentary group's rapporteur on legal professionals, data privacy and labor law.

In 2018, he joined the Committee on Internal Affairs.

The same year, Seif became a member of the first Investigative Committee of the 19th legislative period, which is investigating the failure of German security authorities to prevent Anis Amri's attack on a Berlin Christmas market in December 2016.

After the 2025 federal election, his CDU/CSU parliamentary group appointed him as its representative for the European asylum and migration policy transformation and as the group's spokesperson (Obmann) on the Committee on Internal Affairs.

In addition to his committee assignments, Seif is a member of the German-Maghreb Parliamentary Friendship Group, the German-West-Africa Parliamentary Friendship Group and the German-British Parliamentary Friendship Group. His membership in the German-American Parliamentary Friendship Group is currently suspended.

== Political positions ==
European Affairs

On 17 July 2015, Seif voted against his party's line and rejected the Merkel government’s proposal to negotiate a third bailout for Greece.

As the EU deputy spokesperson for the CDU/CSU parliamentary group and rapporteur for affairs in Great Britain, Seif is outspoken on the topic of Brexit. Before the Brexit referendum in June 2016, Seif stated that if Prime Minister Cameron wanted Britain to stay in the EU, he would have to convince his fellow Britons of the advantages of EU membership. Seif compared Cameron to a “butterfly,” and declared that “Britain does not need a butterfly but a lion.”

Regarding Brexit negotiations, Seif has taken a rigid stance and views the Brexit as a “catastrophe” that “damages economic development and the development of the EU.”

Upon Prime Minister Theresa May's activation of Article 50 of the Treaty of Lisbon beginning formal Brexit proceedings and her remark that a failure to reach an agreement on Brexit would weaken UK-EU cooperation in the fight against crime and terrorism, Seif was one of many German members of parliament who did not take kindly to May's statement, deeming it “an extraordinarily primitive attempt at blackmailing us.”

Seif blamed a leak to the Frankfurter Allgemeine Sonntagszeitung of an unflattering description of the first meeting between UK and EU negotiation teams in May 2017 on a “babbling idiot,” seeing both sides at fault for “the fact that the atmosphere is becoming poisoned.”

Seif believes the Brexit will do significant damage to both Great Britain and the EU and is quoted as saying “a win-win settlement is excluded and it’s appropriate to speak about a lose-lose result.”

In a 26 September 2025 interview with the Kölnische Rundschau, Seif called for a fundamental paradigm shift in EU asylum policy, arguing that strengthening Frontex, expanding physical external-border controls and introducing the EU Entry/Exit System would improve security but would not change the obligation to admit asylum applicants at the EU's external border, who would thereby gain a de facto right of residence. He said the EU's protection categories could apply to around 300 million people and, citing migration researcher Ruud Koopmans, urged a far-reaching overhaul of the Common European Asylum System—beyond the planned reform—toward admissions and procedures in third countries.

Domestic Affairs

Within his party, Seif belongs to the conservative wing.

During the Böhmermann affair in 2016, Seif read the Böhmermann's "smear poem" in the German Bundestag to demonstrate that it is an insult of the Turkish president, which caused the outrage of other MPs.

In June 2017, Seif voted against Germany's introduction of same-sex marriage. Following the party's result in the 2017 elections, he held that voters had abandoned the CDU because, under Angela Merkel, it had moved too far to the left.

Following Germany's September 2017 federal elections, Seif identified points of contention between the CDU, CSU, and SPD, telling Reuters that pensions, Europe and asylum and migration policy were all “areas where there are explosives built into the coalition agreement."

In April 2018, Seif was the first member of the German Bundestag to delete his Facebook account as a result of the Facebook–Cambridge Analytica data scandal. He wrote an open letter to Facebook's Managing Director in Central Europe in which he stated he could not recommend Facebook to anyone, so long as Facebook continued to handle user data in a sloppy fashion.

Ahead of the Christian Democrats’ leadership election, Seif publicly opposed in 2020 Friedrich Merz's candidacy to succeed Annegret Kramp-Karrenbauer as the party's chair.

== Personal life ==
Seif is Protestant, married and has one daughter.
