= Hofmeister (surname) =

Hofmeister is a German surname. Notable people with the surname include:

- Andreas Hofmeister (born 1980), German politician
- Anna Sachse-Hofmeister (1850–1904), Austrian opera singer
- Barbara Hofmeister (born 1954), German swimmer
- Carlos Hofmeister (1909–1974), Argentine athlete
- Franz Hofmeister (1850–1922), Bohemian-German doctor, physiologist, chemist and pharmacologist
- Franz-Peter Hofmeister (born 1951), West German-German athlete
- Josef Hofmeister (born 1934), German motorcycle racer
- Joseph Hofmeister (1867-1933), Bohemia American music composer
- Joy Hofmeister (born 1964), American politician
- Lilian Hofmeister (born 1950), Austrian judge and expert in the field of advancement of women's rights
- Louis E. Hofmeister (1893–1973), American politician
- Ludwig Hofmeister (1887–1959), German footballer
- Max Hofmeister (1913–2000), Austrian soccer player
- Ramona Theresia Hofmeister (born 1996), German snowboarder
- Sebastian Hofmeister (1476–1533), Swiss Christian monk and religious reformer
- Schlomo Hofmeister, Austrian rabbi
- Wilhelm Hofmeister (1824–1877), German biologist and botanist
- Wilhelm Hofmeister (automobile designer) (1912–1978), German automobile designer
