= 4183 Cuno =

Asteroid

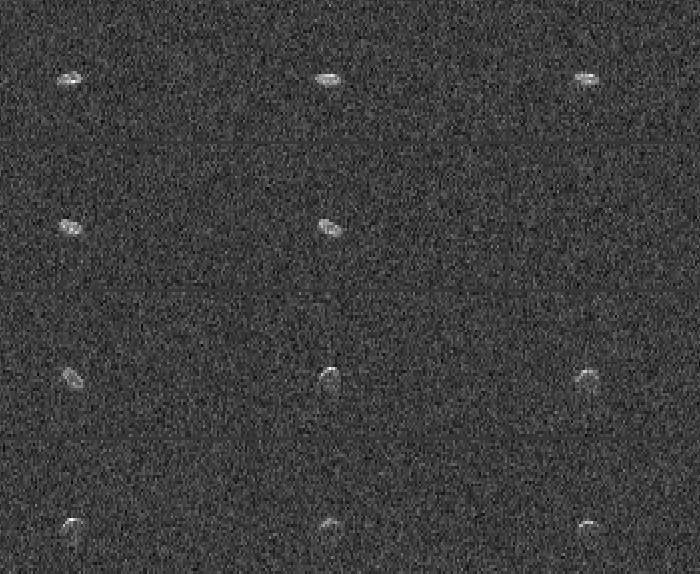
- Several radar images of Cuno

Discovery
- Discovered by: C. Hoffmeister
- Discovery site: Boyden Obs.
- Discovery date: 5 June 1959

Designations
- Named after: Cuno Hoffmeister (astronomer)
- Alternative designations: 1959 LM · 1986 VT_{7} 1987 MB
- Minor planet category: Apollo · NEO · PHA; Mars-crosser; Venus-crosser

Orbital characteristics
- Epoch 4 September 2017 (JD 2458000.5)
- Uncertainty parameter 0
- Observation arc: 57.59 yr (21,036 days)
- Aphelion: 3.2396 AU
- Perihelion: 0.7248 AU
- Semi-major axis: 1.9822 AU
- Eccentricity: 0.6343
- Orbital period (sidereal): 2.79 yr (1,019 days)
- Mean anomaly: 338.28°
- Mean motion: 0° 21^{m} 11.52^{s} / day
- Inclination: 6.7051°
- Longitude of ascending node: 294.90°
- Argument of perihelion: 236.34°
- Earth MOID: 0.0283 AU · 11 LD

Physical characteristics
- Mean diameter: 2.945±0.115 km 3.73±0.15; 3.92 km (calculated); 5.38 km 5.49 km 5.618±0.457 km
- Synodic rotation period: 3.558±0.002 h 3.5590±0.001 h (Note: Pravec (2000) web: rotation period of 3.5590±0.001 hours with a brightness amplitude of 0.83 mag. (LCDB quality code = 3). Summary figures for (4183) Cuno at Collaborative Asteroid Lightcurve Link (CALL)); 3.5595 h (Note: Pravec (1998) web: rotation period 3.5595 hours with a brightness amplitude of 0.7 in magnitude. Call assigns a quality code of 3, which denotes a secure result within the precision given and no ambiguity. Summary figures for (4183) Cuno at Collaborative Asteroid Lightcurve Link (CALL))
- Geometric albedo: 0.097±0.025; 0.10±0.10; 0.10; 0.11; 0.20 (assumed); 0.23±0.04; 0.36±0.06
- Spectral type: SMASS = Sq; Q · S B–V =0.806±0.013; V–R =0.457±0.008; V–I =0.746±0.009
- Absolute magnitude (H): 14.00 · 14.01±0.32 · 14.35 · 14.4

4183 Cuno, provisional designation 1959 LM, is an eccentric asteroid, classified as near-Earth object and potentially hazardous asteroid of the Apollo group, and measures approximately 4 kilometers in diameter.

It was discovered on 5 June 1959, by German astronomer Cuno Hoffmeister at Boyden Observatory in Bloemfontein, South Africa, and later named in the discoverer's honor.

== Classification and orbit ==
Cuno orbits the Sun at a distance of 0.7–3.2 AU once every 2 years and 9 months (1,019 days). Its orbit has an eccentricity of 0.63 and an inclination of 7° with respect to the ecliptic. The body's observation arc begins with its identification as 1986 VT_{7}, the first used observation made at Palomar Observatory in 1986, approximately 27 years after its official discovery observation at Boyden.

The asteroid has an Earth minimum orbital intersection distance of 0.0283 AU (4,230,000 km), which translates into 11 lunar distances. Cuno approaches the Earth to within 40 million kilometers six times in the 21st century. On 20 May 2012, it made its closest Earth approach at a distance of 0.122 AU (18,000,000 km). It will not make a closer approach until 2093 when it will pass Earth at 0.084 AU (13,000,000 km).

Due to its eccentric orbit, it is also a Mars and Venus-crosser.

== Physical characteristics ==
=== Spectral type and composition ===
Cuno is a stony S-type asteroid. As it has a reflective surface, composed of a mixture different silicates, nickel and iron, Cuno has been characterized as a Q-type asteroid by the 1-meter Jacobus Kapteyn Telescope on La Palma, Pan-STARRS' large-scale magnitude survey, and NASA IRTF telescope. On the SMASS taxonomic scheme, Cuno is a Sq-subtype, a transitional group between the S and Q types.

=== Rotation and shape ===
Several rotational lightcurves were obtained by Czech astronomer Petr Pravec and American astronomer Brian Warner between 1998 and 2014. Lightcurve analysis gave a rotation period of 3.56 hours with a high brightness amplitude between 0.47 and 0.83 in magnitude, indicating that the body has a non-spheroidal shape.

In December 2000, Cuno was analysed by radar to determine its shape. The resultant images are lacking in detail, but indicate a rough sphere with some kind of concave depression 1–2 km in diameter.

=== Diameter and albedo ===
Following the space-based surveys carried out by NASA's Spitzer Space Telescope and the NEOWISE mission of the Wide-field Infrared Survey Explorer, Cuno has an albedo between 0.097 and 0.36, and a diameter between 2.945 and 5.618 kilometers.

The Collaborative Asteroid Lightcurve Link assumes a standard albedo for the stony asteroid of 0.20 and calculates a diameter of 3.9 kilometer with an absolute magnitude of 14.4, as the higher the body's albedo (reflectivity), the lower its diameter at a constant absolute magnitude (brightness).

== Naming ==
This minor planet was named after its discoverer, Cuno Hoffmeister, according to the established practice to name near-Earth asteroids with a four-letter masculine name. The central main-belt asteroid 1726 Hoffmeister, namesake of the Hofmeister family, is also named after the discoverer. The official naming citation was published on 28 May 1991 (M.P.C. 18307).
