= Rüdiger Lucassen =

German politician

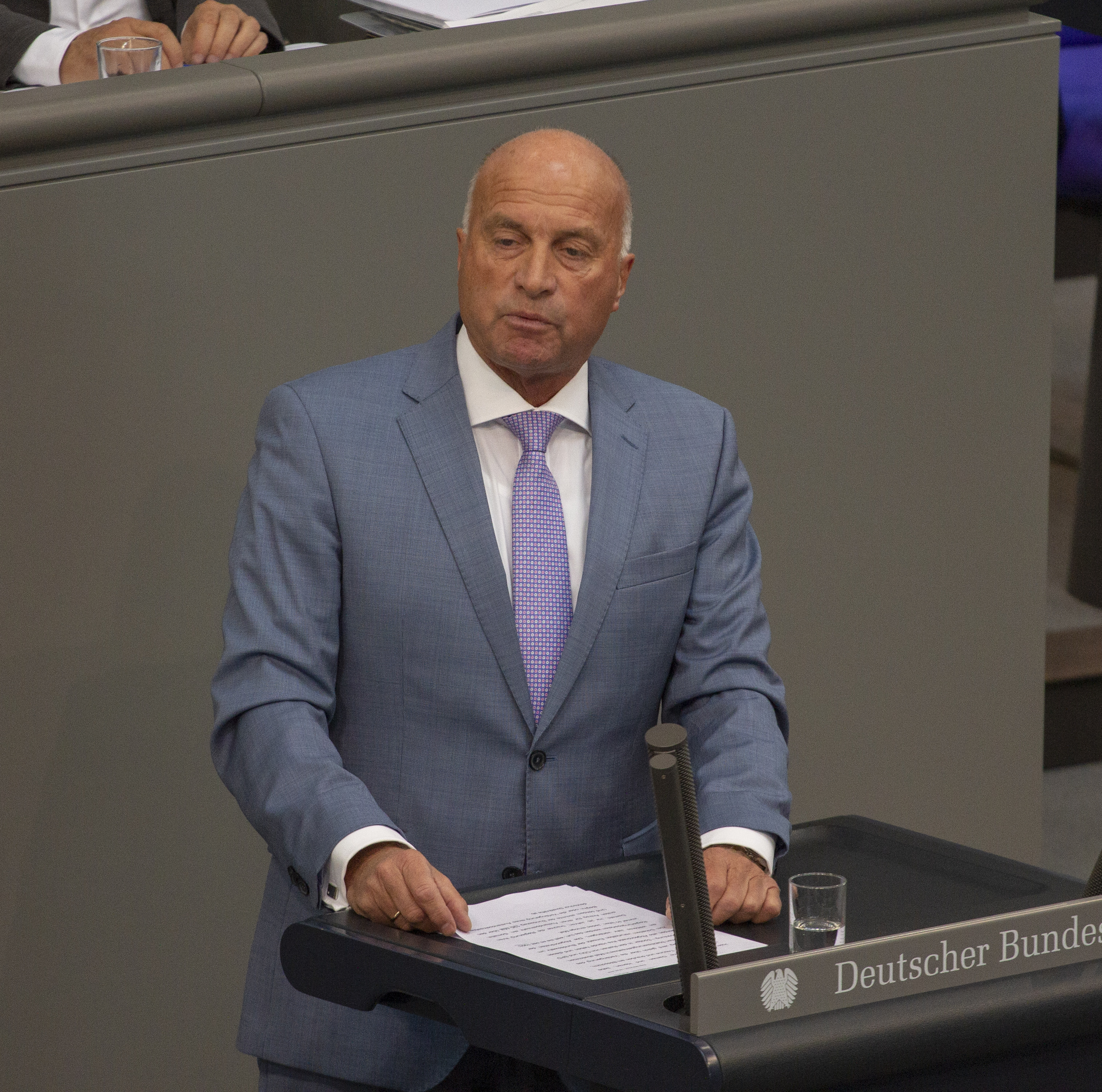
- Lucassen in 2019

Member of the Bundestag
- Incumbent
- Assumed office 24 October 2017

Personal details
- Born: 19 August 1951 (age 74)
- Party: AfD

Rüdiger Lucassen (born 19 August 1951) is a German politician for the far-right Alternative for Germany (AfD) party and, since 2017, he has been a member of the Bundestag.

== Life and politics ==
Lucassen was born 1951 in the West German village of Westerholz and studied at the Helmut Schmidt University in Hamburg and became a commissioned officer of the Bundeswehr, the West German military force. Lucassen entered the populist AfD in 2016 and became after the 2017 German federal election member of the Bundestag. Lucassen was chairman of the state association of the AfD in North Rhine-Westphalia from 2019 to 2022.

Following the Russian invasion of Ukraine, when fellow AfD Bundestag members Steffen Kotré and Eugen Schmidt made an appearance on Russian propaganda journalist Vladimir Solovyov's TV show, Lucassen denounced it as "treason against the people". However, he had previously voted against arms deliveries to Ukraine.

In October 2022, Lucassen called for Germany to acquire nuclear weapons, following a resolution by the Young Alternatives.
