= Vernadskiy (crater) =

Crater on the Moon

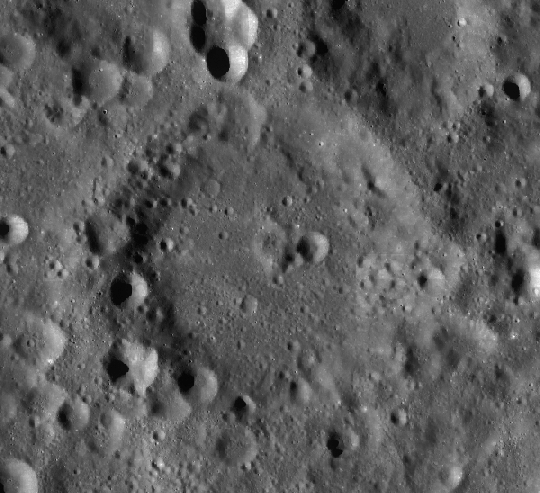
- LRO image
- Coordinates: 23.2°N 130.5°E
- Diameter: 91 km
- Depth: Unknown
- Colongitude: 230° at sunrise
- Eponym: Vladimir I. Vernadsky

Vernadskiy is a lunar impact crater on the far side of the Moon, behind the visible eastern limb. It lies to the west-northwest of the smaller crater Siedentopf. To the south is Gavrilov, and much farther to the west is Meggers.

This is a formation that has seen better days. The outer rim has been bombarded by a myriad of lesser impacts, producing an eroded and irregular edge. Attached to the outer rim to the northeast is the crater Florensky, an equally worn crater. The interior floor of Vernadskiy is also marked by a number of small impacts, although in general it is more level than the uneven terrain that surrounds the crater.

In some sources the name is spelled as Vernadskyy, Vernadskij, or Vernadsky. The spelling followed in this article is that adopted by the IAU in 1970. The crater is named in honour of Vladimir Vernadsky, a Soviet mineralogist.

== Satellite craters ==
By convention these features are identified on lunar maps by placing the letter on the side of the crater midpoint that is closest to Vernadskiy.

Vernadskiy	Latitude	Longitude	Diameter
U	23.7° N	126.5° E	37 km
X	25.9° N	129.0° E	64 km

Vernadskiy B - see Florensky
