= Frank Hoffmeister (lawyer) =

German lawyer

Frank Hoffmeister is a lawyer from Germany now working in the European External Action Service. He is the President of the Brussels branch Europa Union.

== Education ==
Hoffmeister was born in Frankfurt in 1969. He studied law at university and was awarded a Law PhD from Heidelberg University in 1998. He was an assistant at Humboldt University's Walter Hallstein Institute for European Constitutional Law and a research fellow at the Max Planck Institute for International Law.

== Career ==
His career in the European Commission began in 2001 initially working in DG Enlargement and then in legal services. He served in the Commission’s Legal Service and Cyprus Desk. Hoffmeister was a United Nations Special Advisor on Cyprus and an OSCE election observer in Macedonia. He was affiliated with the European University Institute.

Hoffmeister served in the European Commission as the Deputy Head of Karel De Gucht's Cabinet from 2010 until 2014 and in 2017 was Head of the Unit for Investigations, specifically anti-circumvention within the EU's Directorate General for Trade. He also teaches at the Brussels School of Governance of the Vrije Universiteit Brussel.

As of November 2021 Hoffmeister is Director for General Affairs and Chief Legal Officer of the European External Action Service.

He has published over 70 articles and several books.

== Social and Political Activities ==
Hoffmeister joined the pro-European German civil society association Europa-Union in 2004 and became a board member of the Brussels branch thereof. In October 2018, the General Assembly elected him as successor to Dr. Michael Koehler as President of the Brussels branch. The Association organizes pluralistic debates about European topics, and Hoffmeister frequently acts as moderator or panelist in such events.

Hoffmeister is also Vice-President of the German liberals in Brussels (“FDP-Auslandsgruppe”) since 2011. The federal board of the FDP appointed him as member of the Ad Hoc Committee, which drew up the FDP program for the European elections in 2018.
