= Gavrilov (crater) =

Lunar Crater

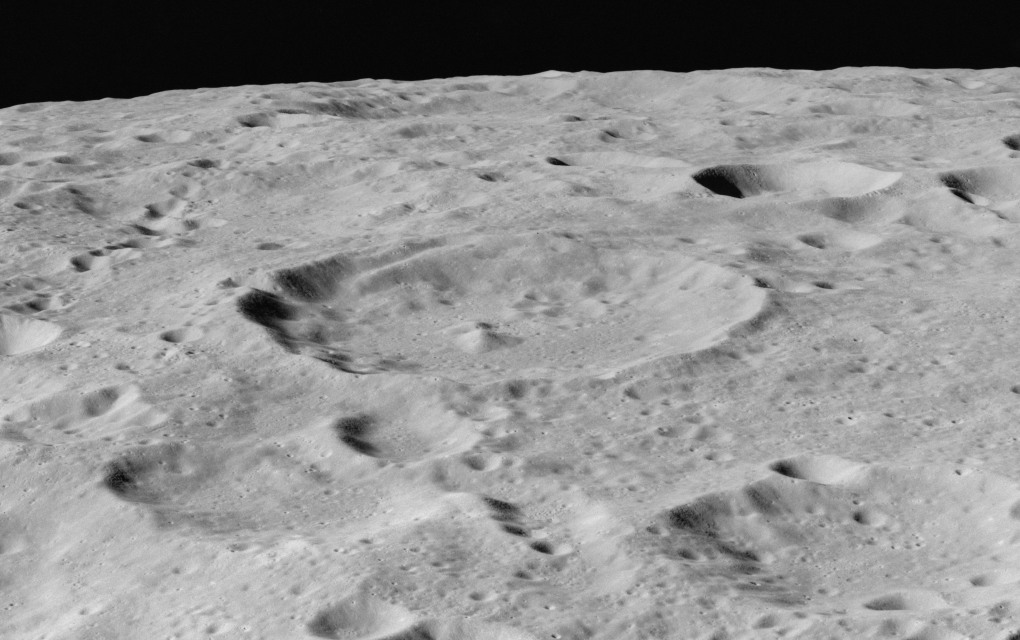
- Oblique Apollo 16 image
- Coordinates: 17.4°N 130.9°E
- Diameter: 60 km
- Depth: Unknown
- Colongitude: 230° at sunrise
- Eponym: Aleksandr I. Gavrilov; Igor B. Gavrilov

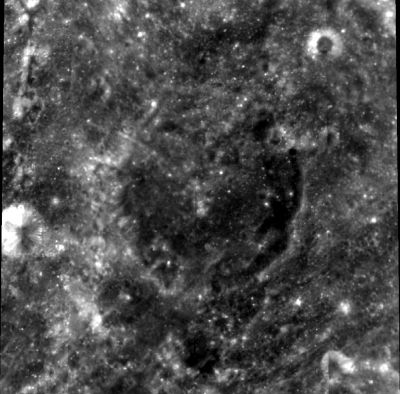
Clementine mosaic

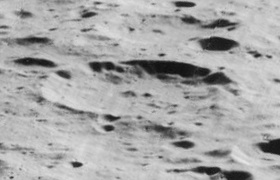
Oblique Lunar Orbiter 5 image

Gavrilov is a lunar impact crater on the far side of the Moon. It lies to the south of the heavily eroded crater Vernadskiy, and north of Vetchinkin.

This is a circular and relatively symmetric crater formation with some erosion of the outer rim. There are some small craterlets in the eastern half of the interior, and a small central rise near the midpoint.

== Satellite craters ==
By convention these features are identified on lunar maps by placing the letter on the side of the crater midpoint that is closest to Gavrilov.

Alder	Latitude	Longitude	Diameter
A	19.6° N	131.9° E	26 km
K	15.0° N	132.5° E	38 km
