= Peter Brown Hoffmeister =

American writer

Pedro/Peter Brown Hoffmeister is an American author, poet, and rock climber. His books include Too Shattered For Mending, This Is The Part Where You Laugh, The End of Boys, Let Them Be Eaten By Bears – A Fearless Guide To Taking Our Kids into The Great Outdoors, Graphic the Valley, Confessions of the Last Man On Earth Without A Cell Phone, and American Afterlife. He has also written for Climbing Magazine, Rock and Ice, Vice, Climbing.com, Gripped Magazine, Ampheta'Zine, and the Huffington Post. He was a 2006 recipient of the Oregon Literary Arts Fellowship for Fiction. He has worked as a rock climbing and whitewater rafting guide, and currently teaches literature, outdoor pursuits, and survival in Eugene, Oregon.

== Works ==
- The End of Boys, a memoir (Soft Skull Press, 2011)
- Let Them Be Eaten By Bears – A Fearless Guide To Taking Our Kids into The Great Outdoors (Penguin, 2013)
- Graphic the Valley (Simon & Schuster, Gallery Books, Tyrus Books, 2013)
- This Is The Part Where You Laugh (Knopf, Random House, 2016)
- Too Shattered For Mending, (Knopf, Random House, 2017)
- Confessions of the Last Man On Earth Without A Cell Phone: Rants, Lists, And Worthless Opinions (Amazon, KDP, 2018)
- American Afterlife (Crooked Lane, Penguin Random House, 2022)

== Awards and recognition ==
- Hoffmeister's novels have earned starred reviews from Kirkus Reviews, Booklist, Publishers Weekly, School Library Journal, VOYA, and The Bulletin.
- His novel This Is The Part Where You Laugh was a School Library Journal Popular Pick, was selected for the "VOYA Perfect Tens 2016" year-end list, and earned an American Library Association distinction for "Best Fiction For Young Adults."

== Professional rock climber and outdoor athlete ==
- Hoffmeister climbs for Metolius and Edelrid.
- Hoffmeister has more than 50 first ascents in Oregon.
- He has written for Climbing Magazine, Rock & Ice, and Gripped.
- He is a sponsored outdoor athlete and an ambassador for Ridgemont Outfitters as well as Elevation Bouldering Gym.

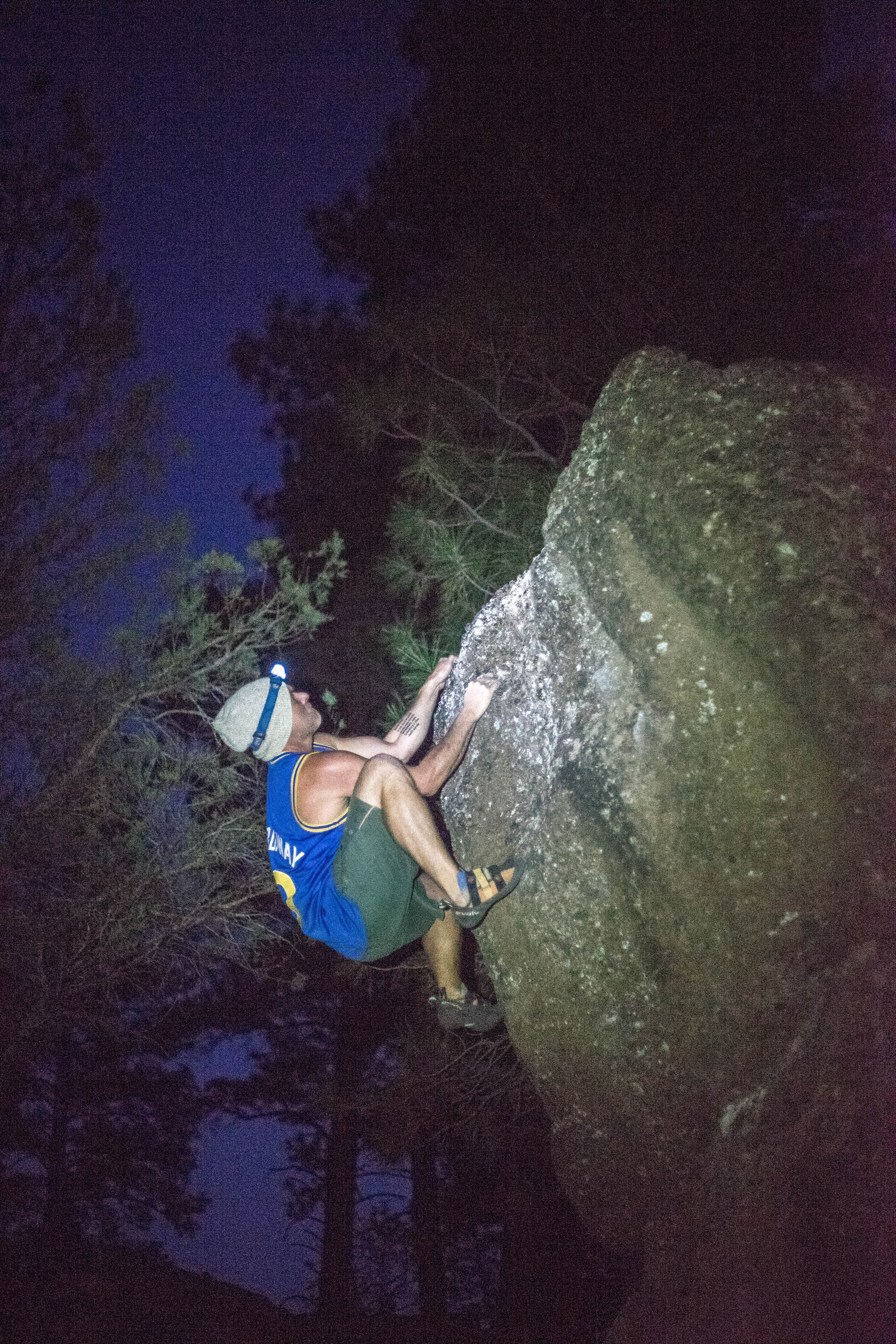
Hoffmeister night bouldering in Central Oregon

== Race against Hans Florine ==
On May 18, 2019, Hoffmeister raced as a professional rock climber and became the world-record holder for most El Capitan ascents Hans Florine in a NIAD ("Nose In A Day" – 3000 feet of rock climbing in one day). The race was titled "Super Local vs. Super Pro," and took place at The Columns, Skinner's Butte Park, in Eugene, Oregon. Both climbers were coming back from devastating injuries. Hoffmeister had the advantage of knowing all of the routes. Florine did not know the routes but is one of the greatest speed climbers of all time. Hoffmeister won the race, climbing 3000 feet, 64 routes, in 2:05:55. Florine clocked 2:27:05 .

== Albums ==
- "The Great American Afterlife" – with Mankind (Art/Sound Recordings, 2012)
