= Cuno Hoffmeister =

German astronomer

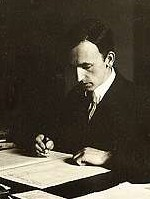
- Born: 2 February 1892; Sonneberg, Saxe-Meiningen, German Empire
- Died: 2 January 1968 (aged 75); Sonneberg, East Germany
- Education: University of Jena
- Known for: Variable stars
- Scientific career
- Fields: Astronomy
- Workplaces: Sonneberg Observatory; Remeis Observatory

Cuno Hoffmeister (2 February 1892 – 2 January 1968) was a German astronomer, observer and discoverer of variable stars, comets and minor planets, and founder of Sonneberg Observatory.

Born in Sonneberg in 1892 to Carl and Marie Hoffmeister, Cuno Hoffmeister obtained his first telescope in 1905 and became an avid amateur astronomer. After his father lost most of his money in 1914, Hoffmeister had to leave school in 1916 to start an apprenticeship in his father's company. During this time he continued to study spherical mathematics and trigonometry. In April 1915 he had the opportunity to substitute as the assistant of Ernst Hartwig at Remeis Observatory in Bamberg while the current holder of the position was drafted, mainly working on observations of meteors and variable stars. He held this position until the end of the war and then moved back to Sonneberg, where he made his Abitur in 1920.

After studying at the University of Jena, while at the same time continuing to work in his job as a tradesman, Hoffmeister obtained his doctorate in 1927. During this time he had already started building what was to become Sonneberg Observatory. After his PhD, he moved back to Sonneberg and started expanding the observatory. Hoffmeister remained at the observatory until his death, even though the observatory lost most of its equipment after World War II and he was disowned as the observatory became part of East Germany's academy of sciences. Hoffmeister served as the director of the observatory until his death. During his life he played a leading role in supporting amateurs in observations of noctilucent clouds, aurorae, and nightglow.

== Discoveries ==
Asteroids discovered: 5
2183 Neufang	26 July 1959
3203 Huth	18 September 1938
3674 Erbisbühl	13 September 1963
4183 Cuno	5 June 1959
4724 Brocken	18 January 1961

During his active life as an astronomer, Hoffmeister discovered approximately 10,000 variable stars on the more than 100,000 photographic plates taken at Sonneberg Observatory. The Minor Planet Center credits him with the discovery of 5 asteroids between 1938 and 1963. He also co-discovered C/1959 O1, a hyperbolic comet, in 1959.

== Honors ==
The lunar crater Hoffmeister and the two minor planets 1726 Hoffmeister and 4183 Cuno were named in his honor (M.P.C. 3933 and 18307). Also Hoffmeister's star in Cassiopeia (V442 = Sonneberg 9484) and Hoffmeister's cloud at 20h47m/-42°.
