= Sonneberg =

- Town
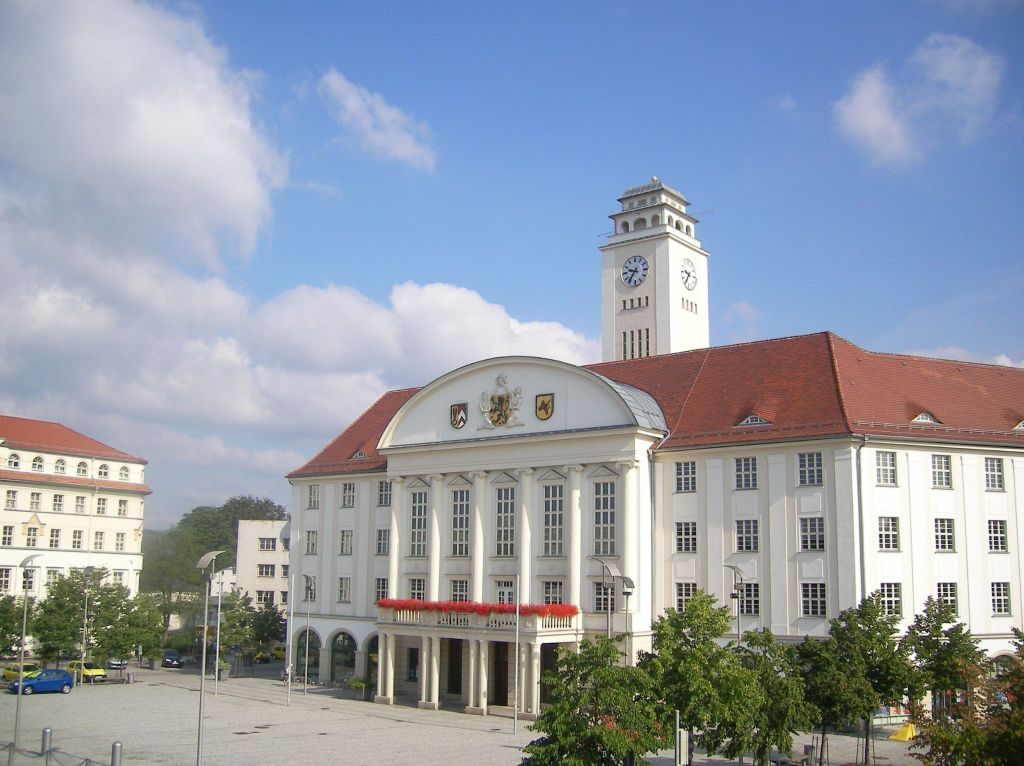
- Town hall

- Coat of arms

- Location of Sonneberg within Sonneberg district
- Interactive map of Sonneberg
- Location within Germany Location within Thuringia
- Coordinates: 50°21′N 11°10′E
- Country: Germany
- State: Thuringia
- District: Sonneberg

Government
  - Mayor (2022–28): Dr. Heiko Voigt (Ind.)

Area
  - Total: 84.69 km^{2} (32.70 sq mi)
- Elevation: 400 m (1,300 ft)

Population (2025-12-31)
  - Total: 22,843
  - Density: 269.7/km^{2} (698.6/sq mi)
- Time zone: UTC+01:00 (CET)
  - Summer (DST): UTC+02:00 (CEST)
- Postal codes: 96515
- Dialling codes: 03675, 036762, 036703
- Vehicle registration: SON, NH
- Website: www.sonneberg.de

Sonneberg (German pronunciation: [ˈzɔnəbɛʁk]) in Thuringia, Germany, is the seat of the Sonneberg district. It is in the Franconian south of Thuringia, neighboring its Upper Franconian twin town Neustadt bei Coburg.

Sonneberg became known as the "world toy city", and is home to the German Toy Museum and the Sonneberg observatory, founded in 1925. The Thuringian Slate Mountains border the city, with the Franconian Forest to the east.

== History ==
"The Sonneberg Castle was also called Sonneberg Castle or the Haus zu Sonneberg in old documents. In 480 Süne or Süno, Duke of Franconia, built this castle because of the Thuringian incursions ..." so it says on page 64 in the topography of the Duke of Saxe-Meiningen's share in the Duchy of Coburg from the year 1781. This not uncritical representation is based on the history of the Franks by Abbot Johannes Trithemius from 1514.

The name Sonneberg was first mentioned in documents in 1207. It goes back to the noble family of the Lords of Sonneberg, which is documented in the 12th and 13th centuries and founded a settlement below the Sonneberg Castle, which originally consisted of the estate and two hamlets, the village of "Alt-Rötin, presumed to be in Herrnau "And the" Stätlein zu Rötin under the Sonneberg Castle". The Lords of Sonneberg were ministerials in the service of the Dukes of Andechs-Meranien, who, as a Bavarian noble family, established a lordly administration in the region around Sonneberg and Coburg.

The quarrying of whetstones and slate for slates has been documented since 1500. From the long-established wooden goods manufacture, the production of the Sonneberg toys known as Nuremberg trinkets developed from the 16th century onwards. Around 1700, the Dressel company, and from 1873 Cuno & Otto Dressel, the largest manufacturer and exporter of toys was founded in Sonneberg. From 1805, with the introduction of paper mache, Sonneberg developed into a toy production center with international status, especially in the manufacture of dolls (see also: F. M. Schilling). In 1840 a city fire destroyed the old city center around the market square in what is now the Upper City. In 1883 the industrial school was opened in Mühlgasse 4, where artistic porcelain, glass and toy design was taught.

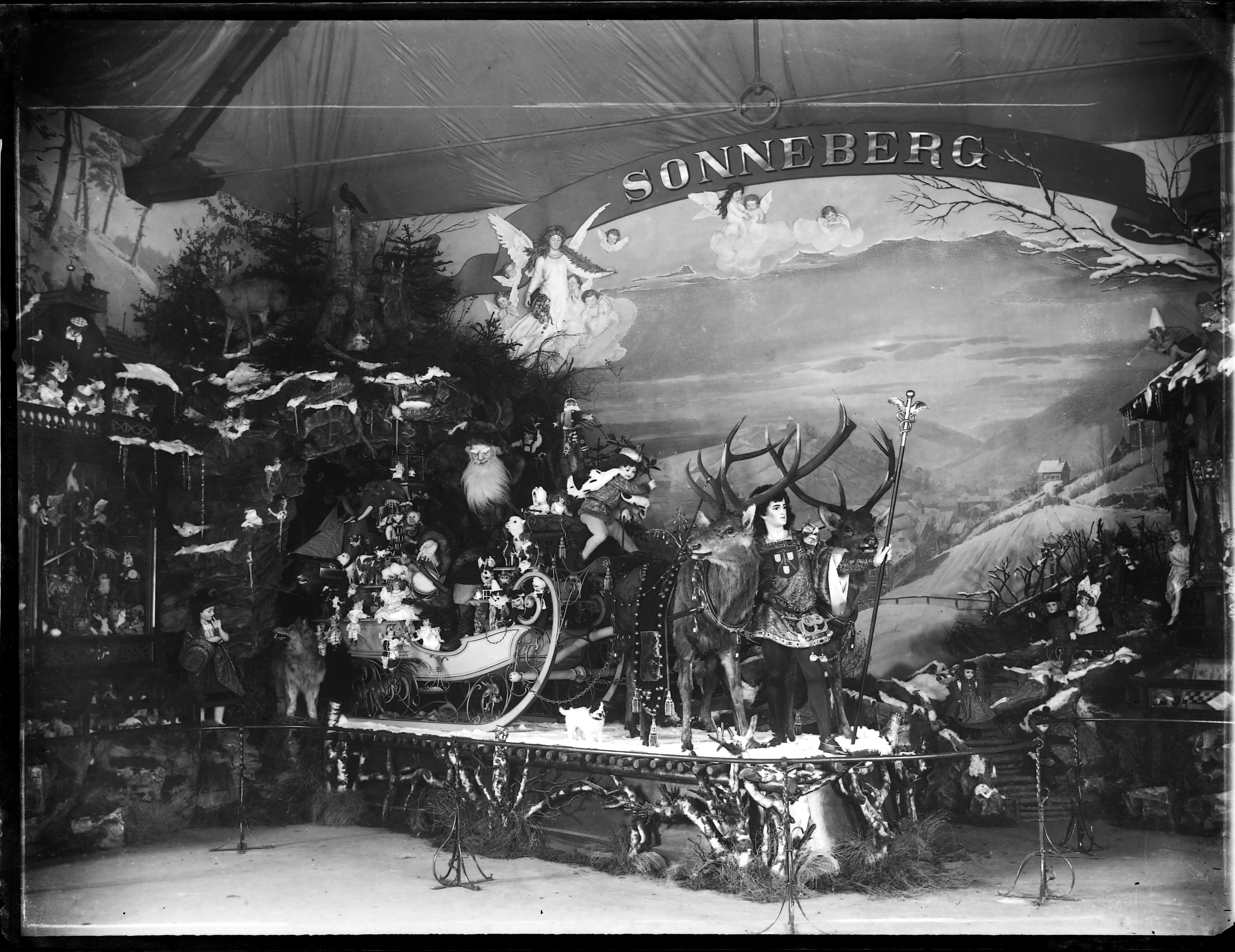
Christmas sleigh at the 1900 Paris Exposition

The term "world toy city" was coined around 1913 due to the share of Sonneberg's production on the world market. Before the First World War, around 20% of the toys traded on the world market in the Sonneberg area were mainly manufactured at home. In addition to the term world toy city, Sonneberg advanced to become the "workshop of the Santa Claus". From the 1870s onwards, the toy industry did not respond to increasing demand and falling sales prices with a transition to industrial production in larger factories using innovative techniques. Even if exports to the US rose by around 600% between 1865 and 1885, in 1880 85% of the companies had just four employees. [10] It was the number of these traditionally working small and micro-businesses that increased tremendously in response to the increased demand. In 1880 there were a total of 321 companies. 1899, almost 20 years later, 2395, an increase of 746%.

One of the heydays of the toy industry led to the development of the station square with representative buildings in the 1920s. First, the US company Halbourn built a six-story trading house that has been owned by the AOK since 1925. Opposite it, in 1926, the American department store company F. W. Woolworth Company, which had been purchasing locally since 1880, built a trading and warehouse for the purchase and export of toys and Christmas tree decorations. The five-storey reinforced concrete building with its own siding was built according to plans by the Sonneberg architect Walter Buchholz.

In divided post-war Germany, Sonneberg found itself within the borders of East Germany, cut off from its large neighbouring town of Coburg, Bavaria in West Germany and could only face north economically. It was served by an unnaturally winding railway route and thus became somewhat isolated from the rest of East Germany. Sonneberg Hauptbahnhof is served by the Coburg–Sonneberg line.

After the fall of the Wall, toy shops were privatized or re-privatized, if they still existed. In 2002 the Thuringian Day took place in Sonneberg. The city became a member of the European metropolitan region of Nuremberg in July 2012, initially on a trial basis, and has been a permanent member since October 2013.

The 14th Franconian Day was celebrated on July 6 and 7, 2019 by the district of Upper Franconia together with the Bavarian state government and the two host cities Sonneberg and Neustadt bei Coburg for the first time across borders with over 25,000 visitors under the motto: GEMEINSAM.FRÄNKISCH.STARK.

Sonneberg is a location with a close network with hydrogen initiatives in the metropolitan region of Central Germany and it is a member of the European metropolitan region of Nuremberg. Thus, Sonneberg has a "hinge function" to the important economic areas between the Main and Elbe. The HySon Institute for Applied Hydrogen Research emerged in February 2021 from a network of actors from business and science. There are 50 partners in total. Their common goal is to close the gap between research and application.

== Subdivisions ==
The town Sonneberg consists of the following subdivisions:

- Bettelhecken
- Hönbach
- Hüttensteinach
- Köppelsdorf
- Malmerz
- Mürschnitz
- Neufang
- Oberlind
- Obere Stadt
- Steinbach
- Untere Stadt
- Unterlind
- Wehd
- Wolkenrasen

Since 31 December 2013, when the former municipality Oberland am Rennsteig was merged into Sonneberg, the following villages also form part of Sonneberg: Haselbach, Eschenthal, Hasenthal, Hüttengrund and Spechtsbrunn.

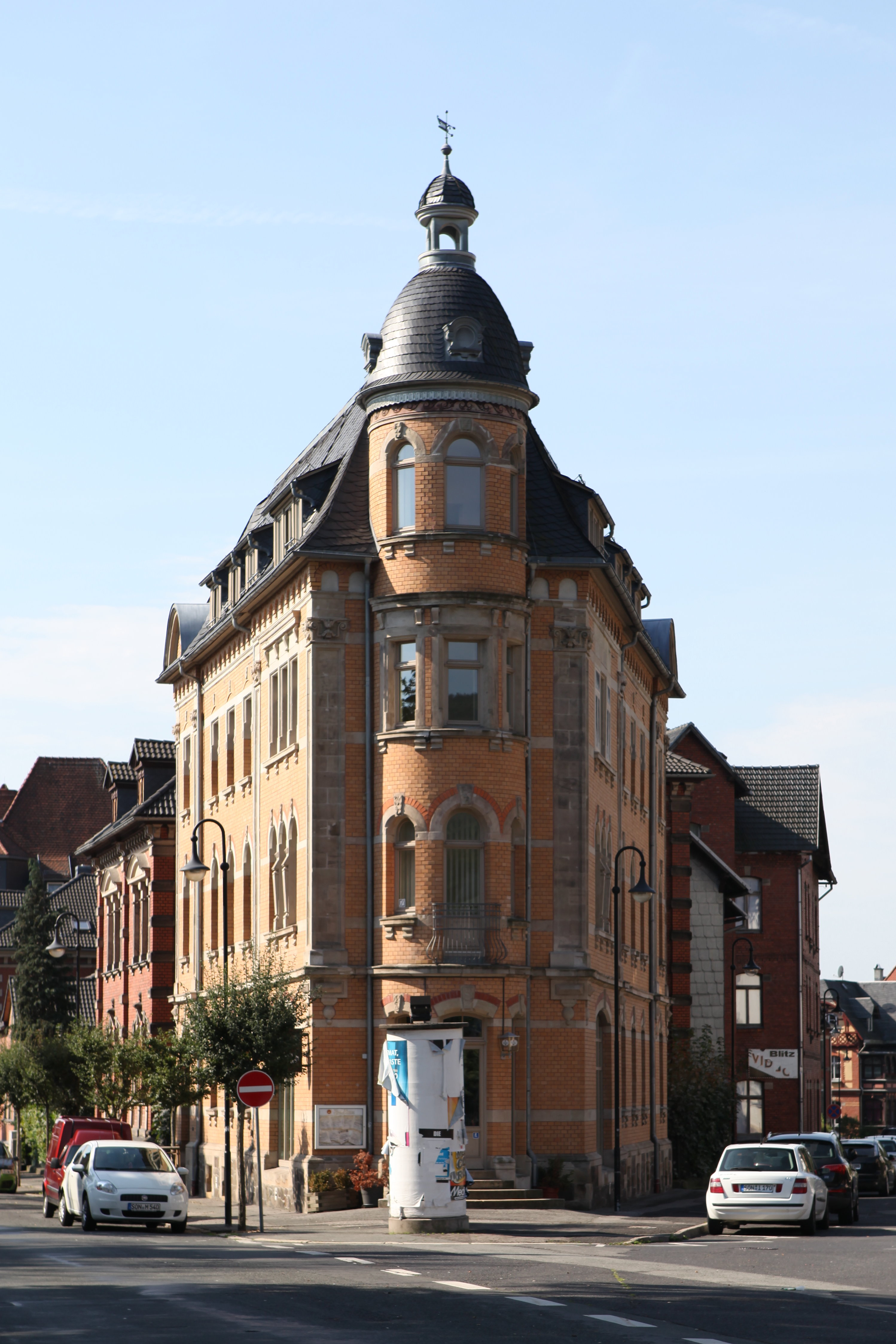
Sonneberg

== Number of inhabitants ==
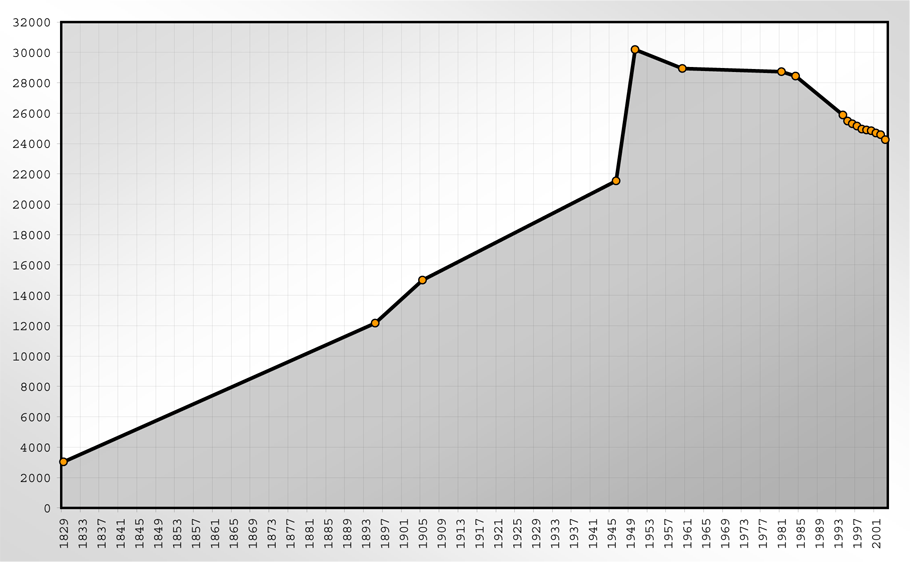

1829-1981

- 1829: 3,028
- 1895: 12,167
- 1905: 15,003
- 1946: 21,534
- 1950: 30,182
- 1960: 28,936
- 1981: 28,733

1984-1999

- 1984: 28,440
- 1994: 25,880
- 1995: 25,481
- 1996: 25,297
- 1997: 25,151
- 1998: 24,951
- 1999: 24,892

2000-2006

- 2000: 24,837
- 2001: 24,690
- 2002: 24,582
- 2003: 24,246
- 2004: 24,026
- 2005: 23,805
- 2006: 23,681

2007-2013

- 2007: 23,252
- 2008: 22,807
- 2009: 22,529
- 2010: 22,356
- 2011: 22,222
- 2012: 21,737
- 2013: 23,796

2014-2020

- 2014: 23,620
- 2015: 23,736
- 2016: 23,804
- 2017: 23,756
- 2018: 23,830
- 2019: 23,516
- 2020: 23,229

Data source since 1994: Thuringia statistical office

== Notable people ==
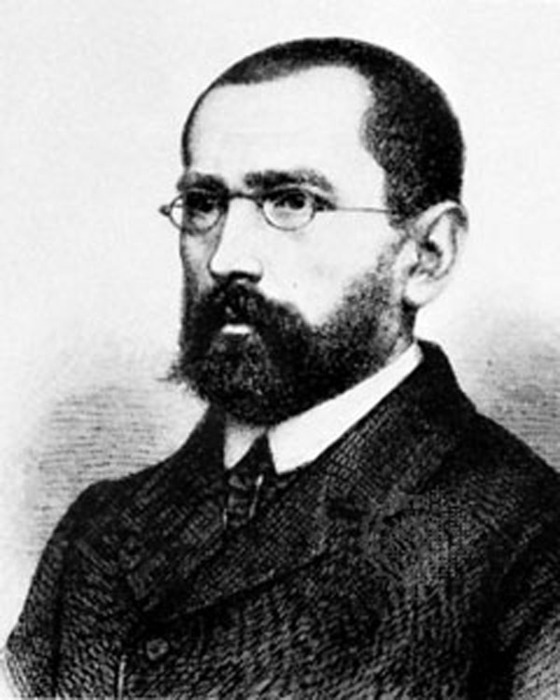
August Schleicher

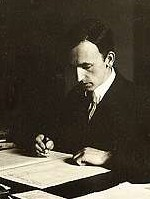
Cuno Hoffmeister

- Crato Bütner (1616–1679), composer
- August Schleicher (1821–1868), linguist
- Wilhelm Sollmann (1881–1951), journalist and politician (SPD)
- Cuno Hoffmeister (1892–1968), astronomer
- Walter Franck (1896–1961), actor
- Fred Delmare (1922–2009), actor
- Tankred Dorst (1925–2017), writer
- Werner Stötzer (1931–2010), sculptor and draftsman
- Almuth Beck (born 1940), politician
- Werner Bernreuther (born 1941), actor and songwriter
- Freddy Breck (1942–2008), percussionist
- Monika Debertshäuser (born 1952), cross-country skier
- Reinhard Häfner (1952–2016), footballer
- Detlef Ultsch (born 1955), judoka, world champion
- Frank Dundr (born 1957), rower, Olympic winner
- Simone Opitz (born 1963), cross-country skier
- Silke Kraushaar-Pielach (born 1970), luger
- André Florschütz (born 1976), luger
- Thomas Florschütz (born 1978), bob pilot
- Sebastian Lang (born 1979), cyclist
- Jan-Armin Eichhorn (born 1981), luger
- Felix Loch (born 1989), 2010 and 2014 Olympic luge gold medalist
