= Sonneberg Observatory =

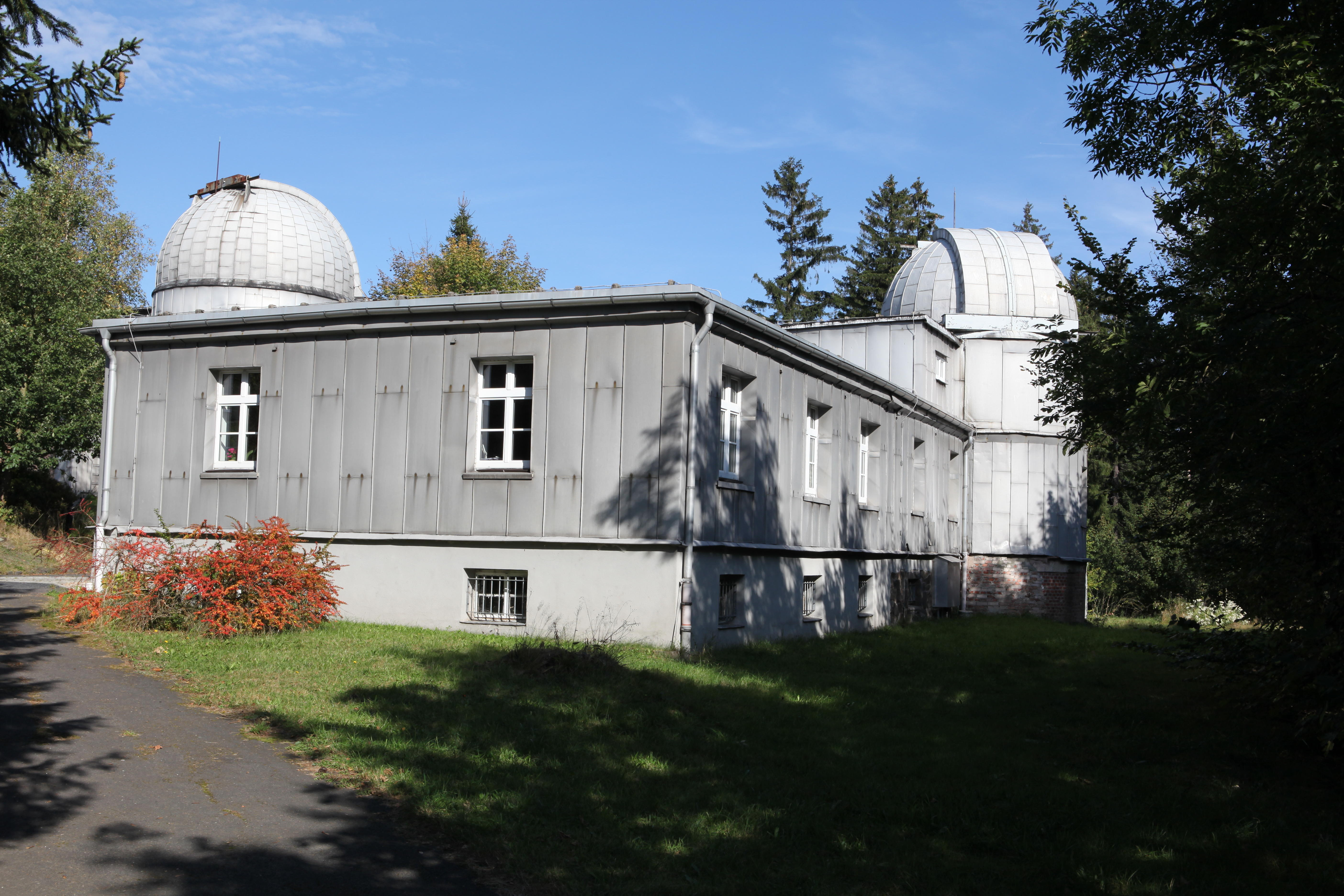
- Sonneberg Observatory in 2012
- Observatory code: 031
- Location: Sonneberg, Thuringia, Germany
- Coordinates: 50°22′39″N 11°11′24″E
- Altitude: 638 m (2,093 ft)
- Established: 1925
- Website: www.sternwarte-sonneberg.de
- Location of Sonneberg Observatory
- Related media on Commons

Sonneberg Observatory (German: Sternwarte Sonneberg) is an astronomical observatory located at 638 m altitude on Erbisbühl in the Neufang district of Sonneberg, Germany. The observatory was founded in 1925 on the initiative of Cuno Hoffmeister by the town of Sonneberg with the support of the Carl-Zeiss-Stiftung. The observatory carries out long-term studies of variable stars. To this end the sky is monitored continuously through photography, resulting in one of the largest archives of astronomical plates.

The observatory was also always engaged in popularising astronomy, which now continues in the Astronomy Museum on site.

== Scientific work ==
The original observing programme was the Sonneberg Field Patrol, which was begun in 1924 by Cuno Hoffmeister and ran until 1995. 41 fields of view along the northern Milky Way were photographed repeatedly at every opportunity. The instrument initially was a 170 mm/1200 mm Zeiss triplet lens. In 1935 a 400 mm/1600 mm quad-lens astrograph began operation, which was removed in 1945. In 1960 and 1961, two quad-lens astrographs were commissioned and the survey was extended to 81 fields, which then included higher galactic latitudes. Both instruments had 400 mm aperture. Their focal lengths were 2000 mm and 1600 mm resp., resulting in fields of view of 8°×8° and 10°×10° resp. A 500 mm/700 mm/1720 mm Schmidt camera was used to monitor open star clusters.

The second programme is the Sonneberg Sky Patrol. It goes back to an idea of Paul Guthnick's, has been running since 1926, and continues to the present. The aim is to monitor not just particular fields, but the whole northern sky with repeat photography. Initially, four cameras were used, two at the Berlin Observatory at Berlin Babelsberg, where Guthnick was director, one at Bamberg and one at Sonneberg. In 1933 the Babelsberg cameras were moved to Sonneberg, in 1944 the one at Bamberg followed. The equipment was modernised in 1958 to consist of seven Zeiss Tessar 71 mm/250 mm lenses and seven Zeiss Tessar 55 mm/250 mm lenses. The fields of view are 26°×26°. Initially the whole sky down to −17.5° was covered, but in the late 1980s this was limited to −10° because of light pollution.

The survey of the northern sky was augmented by plates taken on several excursions that took Hoffmeister to Bolivia, the Caribbean (1930 and 1933), South West Africa (1937/1938 and 1952/1953) and South Africa (1959). In the course of the photographic surveys, 11000 variable stars (as of 2009) were discovered, a quarter of all Galactic variables known. Two Cassegrain reflectors were used for photoelectric multi-colour measurements of variables. In the 1990s these were equipped with CCD cameras.

There has also been an interest in meteors, meteorites and the zodiacal light. The museum has a meteorite collection on display. The observatory has a notable library, containing text books, monographs, conference proceedings etc., as well as periodicals and publications from other institutes and organisations. The library includes the Bibliographic Catalogue on Variable Stars, a card catalogue pinpointing literature up to the early 1990s on variable stars. This has been adopted and continued by the Centre de données astronomiques de Strasbourg.

== Plate archive ==
As of 1994, about 17,000 30 cm × 30 cm plates had been taken as part of the Field Patrol, about 131,000 13 cm × 13 cm plates as part of the Sky Patrol. The Schmidt camera added another 8500 13 cm × 13 cm plates. Another 5000 plates resulted from Hoffmeister's excursions to Latin America and Africa. As of 2008, the number of plates totals about 300,000. After that of the Harvard College Observatory, this is the second largest archive of astronomical plates worldwide.

The archive is kept in two protected and climate-controlled rooms. The plate catalogue has been computerised. Digitisation of the plates began in the early 1980s. As of 2022, 85% of the plates had been digitised.

== Science outreach ==
Engaging the public in astronomy was an objective from the beginning as municipal observatory. The current Astronomy Museum opened in 1998 in the oldest building of the observatory. It is available for visits by individuals and groups. There are tours of the observatory and meteorite collection as well as weekly public observing sessions. It has at its disposal Hoffmeister's historic refractor and one of the Cassegrain reflectors. Children's birthdays and weddings can be held on site.

== Instruments and buildings ==
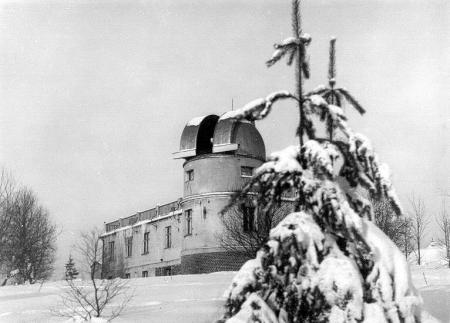
One of the Sonneberg domes, ca. 1935

The original 1925 building was small and had a 5 m dome. Several wooden barracks with movable roofs from that time no longer exist. The first building was later extended and then included a lecture hall. In 1938 a new instrument, an astrograph was installed. This was removed to the Soviet Union after the Second World War, but replaced in 1960/1961 with two astrographs, funded, resp., by Zeiss Jena and Hoffmeister.

In the 1950s three buildings with domes were added, which included laboratories and offices. In 1960 a new main building was erected, with basement and two floors. This has domes of 8 m and 5 m diameter. In 1962 the new survey station began operation, which could photograph the whole sky to −35° declination on a nightly basis with B as well as V filters. In the 1970s a separate workshop building was erected and all buildings were covered with aluminium sheet for insulation and protection against the elements.

Since 1994 the site is listed as a historic monument. As of 2022, further restoration work is expected.

There are currently the following telescopes and cameras:

- A historic refractor 135/2030 mm.
- A Schmidt camera 500/700/1720 mm.
- A Cassegrain reflector 600/1800 mm.
- A Cassegrain reflector 600/1800/7500 mm.
- Two Astrographs with 400 mm aperture.
- Seven cameras Zeiss Tessar 56/250 mm for the Sky Patrol, four working in photographic spectral sensitivity and three in photovisual spectral sensitivity.
- A CCD camera with wide angle lens.

== History of operating and funding agencies, staff ==
The observatory was founded in 1925 on the initiative of Cuno Hoffmeister as a municipal observatory financed by the town of Sonneberg and with support of the Carl-Zeiss-Stiftung. It worked in close collaboration with the observatory at Bamberg and Berlin Observatory at Berlin Babelsberg to monitor the sky photographically. In 1930/1931 the observatory transferred from the town to the state of Prussia and became formally affiliated to the Berlin Observatory.

In 1938 Paul Ahnert took up a position at the observatory. He had been removed from his position as teacher in 1933 by the Nazi regime because of his membership in the Social Democratic Party of Germany. During the Second World War, from 1940 onwards, the observatory carried out weather observations for the Luftwaffe. Although the town was bombarded by the US Air Force in April 1945, just days before the area was occupied by the US Army, the observatory suffered no direct damage. In July 1945 the area changed into the Soviet occupied zone.

After the War, Hoffmeister was able to continue the research programme under Soviet occupation. However, the 400 mm astrograph and two survey cameras were removed to the Soviet Union as World War II reparations. At the same time, funding from Babelsberg ceased. Hoffmeister from his own savings, then the town and the Carl-Zeiss-Stiftung, funded the observatory for a time. In April 1946 the Prussian Academy of Sciences was succeeded by the German Academy of Sciences at Berlin; the observatory became a member institute. This led to an expansion in terms of buildings, and instruments; staff levels rose to 35. After Germany separated into East and West Germany in 1949, until the early 1960s, the observatory boomed. However, after the Berlin Wall was built in 1961, the Sonneberg Observatory found itself inside the restricted border area.

In 1967 a reform of the academy resulted in the dismissal of Hoffmeister as director and the observatory becoming part of the Zentralinstitut für Astrophysik in Potsdam. The closure of the site was scheduled for 1969, research into variable stars was to end, staff was to move to Potsdam. The head of the observatory, Wolfgang Wenzel, managed to avert closure and then ignored a ban on using the large instruments until it was rescinded two years later. Until 1991 the observatory remained part of the Zentralinstitut; staff levels rose to 36.

After German reunification in 1990 the observatory briefly came under the auspices of the state of Brandenburg. (Note: Whereas Sonneberg is in the state of Thuringia, the observatory was part of the Zentralinstitut in Potsdam, which is in Brandenburg.) In 1991 the German Science and Humanities Council recommended closure of the site. Again, the director, now Woldemar Götz, managed to avert immediate closure. Instead, Sonneberg in 1992 became part of the state observatory Thüringer Landessternwarte Tautenburg; it hence transferred from Brandenburg to Thuringia. Closure was now scheduled for 1993 with the plate archive to be moved to Tautenburg.

In 1992 the support association Freunde der Sternwarte Sonneberg e.V. (Friends of Sonneberg Observatory) was formed by the observatory's acting director Hans-Jürgen Bräuer and the founder's nephew Klaus Hoffmeister. At the end of 1993, the staff level was down to 10. The 1994 IAU Symposium no. 161 held in Potsdam adopted a resolution emphasising the importance of the plate archive and calling on the authorities not to close the observatory. The observatory did close at the end of 1994.

Initiated by the Freunde, the town of Sonneberg and the district of Sonneberg formed the Zweckverband Sternwarte Sonneberg (Administration Union Sonneberg Observatory) in order to reopen the observatory in late 1995 with four staff and Constanze la Dous as director. Startup finance was secured from the states of Thuringia and Bavaria. (Note: Sonneberg is near the border of Thuringia with Bavaria.) In 1997 the Astronomy Museum was set up, operated by the Freunde and a dedicated association Astronomiemuseum e.V.

In 2000 the spin-off company 4pi Systeme – Gesellschaft für Astronomie und Informationstechnologie mbH (4pi Systems – Society for Astronomy and Information Technology Ltd) is formed by former staff of the observatory. It rents offices at the observatory and makes regular donations to the Zweckverband. By 2002 it became clear that the unique arrangement of a town and district running a research observatory was unsustainable in the long run. Since 2004 the observatory is run by 4pi Systeme on leasehold from the Zweckverband. 4π Systeme maintains the site and buildings, can use them commercially, continues the sky survey, and continues digitising the plate archive. Science outreach work, including operation of the Astronomy Museum, is delegated to the Freunde.

In 2007 the plate archive, library and instruments changed ownership from the state of Thuringia to the Zweckverband. These resources remain available to 4π Systeme to use and maintain them. As of 2008 there are 16 staff.

== See also ==
- List of astronomical observatories
