= 3254 Bus =

Hildian asteroid

Discovery
- Discovered by: E. Bowell
- Discovery site: Anderson Mesa Stn.
- Discovery date: 17 October 1982

Designations
- Named after: Schelte J. Bus (American astronomer)
- Alternative designations: 1982 UM · 1982 SW_{4}
- Minor planet category: main-belt · Hilda

Orbital characteristics
- Epoch 4 September 2017 (JD 2458000.5)
- Uncertainty parameter 0
- Observation arc: 34.69 yr (12,671 days)
- Aphelion: 4.6044 AU
- Perihelion: 3.3052 AU
- Semi-major axis: 3.9548 AU
- Eccentricity: 0.1643
- Orbital period (sidereal): 7.86 yr (2,873 days)
- Mean anomaly: 182.71°
- Mean motion: 0° 7^{m} 31.08^{s} / day
- Inclination: 4.4462°
- Longitude of ascending node: 43.479°
- Argument of perihelion: 305.67°
- Jupiter MOID: 0.8515 AU

Physical characteristics
- Dimensions: 31.104±0.895 km 32.03 km (calculated); 35.07±0.95 km
- Synodic rotation period: 6.62 h
- Geometric albedo: 0.057 (assumed); 0.058±0.003; 0.073±0.002
- Spectral type: SMASS = T D · T
- Absolute magnitude (H): 11.00 · 11.2

3254 Bus, provisional designation 1982 UM, is a rare-type Hildian asteroid from the outermost region of the asteroid belt, approximately 32 kilometers in diameter. It was discovered on 17 October 1982, by American astronomer Edward Bowell at Lowell's Anderson Mesa Station in Flagstaff, Arizona. It is named after astronomer Schelte J. Bus.

== Orbit and classification ==
Located in the outermost part of the main-belt, Bus is a member of the Hilda family, a large orbital group of asteroids that are thought to have originated from the Kuiper belt. It orbits the Sun at a distance of 3.3–4.6 AU once every 7 years and 10 months (2,873 days). Its orbit has an eccentricity of 0.16 and an inclination of 4° with respect to the ecliptic. It was first identified as 1982 SW_{4} at Crimea–Nauchnij, extending the body's observation arc by 3 weeks prior to its official discovery observation at Flagstaff.

== Physical characteristics ==
In the SMASS taxonomy, Bus is a rare T-type asteroid, while NASA's Wide-field Infrared Survey Explorer (WISE) characterizes Bus as a dark D-type asteroid.

=== Rotation period ===
In the late 1980s or early 1990s, a rotational lightcurve of Bus was obtained from photometric observations by American astronomer Richard P. Binzel. Lightcurve analysis gave a rotation period of 6.62 hours with a brightness variation of 0.31 magnitude (U=2).

=== Diameter and albedo ===
According to the surveys carried out by the Japanese Akari satellite and the WISE spacecraft with its subsequent NEOWISE mission, Bus measures 31.104 and 35.07 kilometers in diameter and its surface has an albedo of 0.058 and 0.073, respectively. The Collaborative Asteroid Lightcurve Link assumes a standard albedo for carbonaceous asteroids of 0.057 and calculates a diameter of 32.03 kilometers using an absolute magnitude of 11.2.

== Naming ==
This minor planet was named after American astronomer Schelte J. Bus, a prolific discoverer of minor planets and comets. The approved naming citation was published by the Minor Planet Center on 2 July 1985 (M.P.C. 9771).
