= 7553 Buie =

Main-belt asteroid

Discovery
- Discovered by: E. Bowell
- Discovery site: Anderson Mesa Stn.
- Discovery date: 30 March 1981

Designations
- Pronunciation: /ˈbuːiː/
- Named after: Marc Buie (American astronomer)
- Alternative designations: 1981 FG · 1988 AJ_{3}
- Minor planet category: main-belt · (inner); Nysa–Polana complex

Orbital characteristics
- Epoch 23 March 2018 (JD 2458200.5)
- Uncertainty parameter 0
- Observation arc: 67.45 yr (24,636 d)
- Aphelion: 2.7426 AU
- Perihelion: 2.0397 AU
- Semi-major axis: 2.3911 AU
- Eccentricity: 0.1470
- Orbital period (sidereal): 3.70 yr (1,351 d)
- Mean anomaly: 15.366°
- Mean motion: 0° 15^{m} 59.76^{s} / day
- Inclination: 3.2788°
- Longitude of ascending node: 74.697°
- Argument of perihelion: 95.606°

Physical characteristics
- Mean diameter: 3.442±0.220 km
- Synodic rotation period: 4.245±0.0071 h
- Geometric albedo: 0.259±0.063
- Spectral type: S (Pan-STARRS); S (SDSS-MOC)
- Absolute magnitude (H): 14.4

7553 Buie (/ˈbuːiː/), provisional designation 1981 FG, is an asteroid from the inner regions of the asteroid belt, approximately 3.5 kilometers (2.2 miles) in diameter. It was discovered on 30 March 1981, by American astronomer Edward Bowell at Lowell's Anderson Mesa Station near Flagstaff, Arizona. The stony S-type asteroid has a rotation period 4.2 hours an possibly an elongated shape. It was named after American astronomer Marc Buie.

== Orbit and classification ==
Buie orbits the Sun in the inner main-belt at a distance of 2.0–2.7 AU once every 3 years and 8 months (1,351 days; semi-major axis of 2.39 AU). Its orbit has an eccentricity of 0.15 and an inclination of 3° with respect to the ecliptic. It is a member of the Hertha family of S-type asteroids, which lies within the Nysa–Polana complex of the inner main belt. A first precovery was taken at the Palomar Observatory in December 1950, extending the asteroid's observation arc by 31 years prior to its discovery.

== Naming ==
This minor planet was named in honor of American Marc William Buie (born 1958), an astronomer at the discovering Lowell Observatory and a prolific discoverer of minor planets including several trans-Neptunian objects. His contributions to planetary astronomy also include research on the moons of Pluto and the development of widely used astronomical software. The official naming citation was published by the Minor Planet Center on 28 July 1999 (M.P.C. 35486).

== Physical characteristics ==
Buie has been characterized as a stony S-type asteroid by PanSTARRS photometric survey. It is also an S-type in the SDSS-based taxonomy.

=== Rotation period ===
In September 2012, a rotational lightcurve of Buie was obtained from photometric observations made at the Palomar Transient Factory, California. In the R-band, it gave a rotation period of 4.2418±0.0071 hours with a brightness variation of 0.51 magnitude, while in the SG-Band the period was 4.2453±0. hours with an amplitude of 0.53 magnitude (U=2/2). A high brightness variation typically indicates a non-spherical shape.

=== Diameter and albedo ===
According to the survey carried out by the NEOWISE mission of NASA's Wide-field Infrared Survey Explorer, Buie measures 3.4 kilometers in diameter and its surface has an albedo of 0.259, while the Collaborative Asteroid Lightcurve Link assumes a standard albedo for stony asteroids of 0.20 and calculates a diameter of 3.92 kilometers using an absolute magnitude of 14.4.
