= 2939 Coconino =

Main-belt asteroid

Discovery
- Discovered by: E. Bowell
- Discovery site: Anderson Mesa Stn.
- Discovery date: 21 February 1982

Designations
- Named after: Coconino County (U.S. county in Arizona)
- Alternative designations: 1982 DP · 1952 HU_{3} 1976 ST_{4}
- Minor planet category: main-belt · Nysa–Polana complex

Orbital characteristics
- Epoch 4 September 2017 (JD 2458000.5)
- Uncertainty parameter 0
- Observation arc: 40.69 yr (14,861 days)
- Aphelion: 2.8399 AU
- Perihelion: 2.0394 AU
- Semi-major axis: 2.4396 AU
- Eccentricity: 0.1641
- Orbital period (sidereal): 3.81 yr (1,392 days)
- Mean anomaly: 47.539°
- Inclination: 3.9489°
- Longitude of ascending node: 349.97°
- Argument of perihelion: 237.31°

Physical characteristics
- Dimensions: 5.607±0.177 km 9.40 km (calculated)
- Synodic rotation period: 4.68138±0.00004 h
- Geometric albedo: 0.20 (assumed); 0.512±0.043
- Spectral type: S
- Absolute magnitude (H): 12.5 · 12.6 · 12.92±0.10

2939 Coconino, provisional designation 1982 DP, is a stony asteroid from the inner regions of the asteroid belt, approximately 6 kilometers in diameter. It was discovered on 21 February 1982, by American astronomer Edward Bowell at Lowell's Anderson Mesa Station in Flagstaff, United States. It is named after the Coconino County in Arizona.

== Orbit and classification ==
Coconino is a stony S-type asteroid and a member Nysa–Polana complex, a collection of overlapping asteroid families. It orbits the Sun in the inner main-belt at a distance of 2.0–2.8 AU once every 3 years and 10 months (1,392 days). Its orbit has an eccentricity of 0.16 and an inclination of 4° with respect to the ecliptic. It was first identified as 1952 HU_{3} at McDonald Observatory in 1952, extending the body's observation arc by 30 years prior to its official discovery observation at Flagstaff.

== Physical characteristics ==
=== Rotation period ===
In February 2005, a rotational lightcurve of Coconino was obtained from photometric observations by astronomer Horácio Correia. Lightcurve analysis gave a well-defined rotation period of 4.68138 hours with a brightness amplitude of 0.46 magnitude (U=3).

=== Diameter and albedo ===
According to the survey carried out by NASA's Wide-field Infrared Survey Explorer with its subsequent NEOWISE mission, Coconino measures 5.607 kilometers in diameter and its surface has a high albedo of 0.512, while the Collaborative Asteroid Lightcurve Link assumes a standard albedo for stony asteroids of 0.20 and consequently calculates a larger diameter of 9.40 kilometers, using an absolute magnitude of 12.5.

== Naming ==
This minor planet was named after the U.S. Coconino County, Arizona, of which the city of Flagstaff with its discovering observatory is the county seat. The word "Coconino" derives from the language of the Hopi Tribe of Arizona. The official naming citation was published by the Minor Planet Center on 17 February 1984 (M.P.C. 8544).
