= 2246 Bowell =

Asteroid

Discovery
- Discovered by: E. Bowell
- Discovery site: Anderson Mesa Stn.
- Discovery date: 14 December 1979

Designations
- Named after: Edward Bowell (American astronomer)
- Alternative designations: 1979 XH · 1942 GP; 1973 FH_{2} · 1973 FR; 1976 SL_{6} · 1977 SM_{3}
- Minor planet category: main-belt · Hilda

Orbital characteristics
- Epoch 4 September 2017 (JD 2458000.5)
- Uncertainty parameter 0
- Observation arc: 62.06 yr (22,666 days)
- Aphelion: 4.3289 AU
- Perihelion: 3.5863 AU
- Semi-major axis: 3.9576 AU
- Eccentricity: 0.0938
- Orbital period (sidereal): 7.87 yr (2,876 days)
- Mean anomaly: 244.37°
- Mean motion: 0° 7^{m} 30.72^{s} / day
- Inclination: 6.4941°
- Longitude of ascending node: 155.66°
- Argument of perihelion: 21.544°
- Jupiter MOID: 0.6437 AU

Physical characteristics
- Dimensions: 40.73±1.70 km 44.21±3.2 km (IRAS:6); 48.424±0.429
- Synodic rotation period: 4.992 h
- Geometric albedo: 0.045±0.012; 0.0540±0.009 (IRAS:6); 0.066±0.006
- Spectral type: D (Tholen and SMASS); D B–V = 0.746; U–B = 0.239
- Absolute magnitude (H): 10.56 · 10.65±0.20

2246 Bowell, provisional designation 1979 XH, is a rare-type Hildian asteroid from the outermost region of the asteroid belt, approximately 44 kilometers in diameter. It was discovered on 14 December 1979, by American astronomer Edward Bowell at Lowell Observatory's Anderson Mesa Station, and named after the discoverer himself.

== Orbit and classification ==
Bowell is a member of the Hilda family, the outermost orbital group of asteroids in the main-belt, that are in a 3:2 orbital resonance with Jupiter.

It orbits the Sun at a distance of 3.6–4.3 AU once every 7 years and 10 months (2,876 days). Its orbit has an eccentricity of 0.09 and an inclination of 6° with respect to the ecliptic. The first used precovery was taken at Palomar Observatory in 1955, extending the asteroid's observation arc by 24 years prior to its discovery.

== Physical characteristics ==
Bowell has a reddish D-type spectrum on both the SMASS and Tholen taxonomic scheme, and is one of only 46 known bodies with such a spectral type.

=== Rotation period ===
A rotational lightcurve of Bowell was obtained during a photometric survey of Hildian asteroids at the Uppsala Astronomical Observatory and others places in the late 1990s. The lightcurve gave a well-defined rotation period of 4.992 hours with a brightness variation of 0.46 in magnitude (U=3).

=== Diameter and albedo ===
According to the surveys carried out by the Japanese Akari satellite, the Infrared Astronomical Satellite IRAS (six observations), and NASA's Wide-field Infrared Survey Explorer with its subsequent NEOWISE mission, Bowell measures 40.7, 44.2 and 48.4 kilometers in diameter and its surface has an albedo of 0.066, 0.054 and 0.045, respectively. The Collaborative Asteroid Lightcurve Link agrees with the results obtained by IRAS.

== Naming ==
This minor planet was named in honor of its discoverer, the American astronomer Edward L. G. Bowell (born 1943), based on a proposal by MPC's longtime director Brian G. Marsden. Astronomer at the Lowell Observatory and a prolific discoverer of minor planets himself, Bowell has made significant contributions on the observatory's UBV photometry and astrometry programs for minor planets, including the prediction of occultation events. The official naming citation was published by the Minor Planet Center on 1 January 1981 (M.P.C. 5688).
