= 5677 Aberdonia =

Main-belt asteroid

Discovery
- Discovered by: E. Bowell
- Discovery site: Anderson Mesa Stn.
- Discovery date: 21 September 1987

Designations
- Named after: University of Aberdeen (Scottish university)
- Alternative designations: 1987 SQ_{1} · 1973 UL_{1} 1978 WN_{16} · 1989 AK_{8}
- Minor planet category: main-belt · Koronis

Orbital characteristics
- Epoch 4 September 2017 (JD 2458000.5)
- Uncertainty parameter 0
- Observation arc: 62.27 yr (22,744 days)
- Aphelion: 3.0052 AU
- Perihelion: 2.6635 AU
- Semi-major axis: 2.8344 AU
- Eccentricity: 0.0603
- Orbital period (sidereal): 4.77 yr (1,743 days)
- Mean anomaly: 49.056°
- Mean motion: 0° 12^{m} 23.4^{s} / day
- Inclination: 1.5003°
- Longitude of ascending node: 201.12°
- Argument of perihelion: 216.63°

Physical characteristics
- Dimensions: 8.19 km (calculated); 8.798±0.114 km
- Synodic rotation period: 5.0813±0.0410 h
- Geometric albedo: 0.24 (assumed); 0.250±0.022
- Spectral type: S
- Absolute magnitude (H): 12.6 · 12.4 · 13.224±0.003 (S) · 12.70±0.32

5677 Aberdonia, provisional designation 1987 SQ_{1}, is a stony Koronis asteroid from the outer region of the asteroid belt, approximately 8 kilometers in diameter. It was discovered on 21 September 1987, by American astronomer Edward Bowell at Lowell's Anderson Mesa Station in Flagstaff, Arizona, United States. The asteroid was named for the Scottish University of Aberdeen.

== Orbit and classification ==
The S-type asteroid is a member of the Koronis family, a group consisting of about 200 known bodies with nearly ecliptical orbits. It orbits the Sun in the outer main-belt at a distance of 2.7–3.0 AU once every 4 years and 9 months (1,743 days). Its orbit has an eccentricity of 0.06 and an inclination of 2° with respect to the ecliptic.

In 1954, a first precovery was obtained at Palomar Observatory, extending the body's observation arc by 33 years prior to its official discovery at Anderson Mesa.

== Physical characteristics ==
=== Lightcurves ===
In October 2011, a rotational lightcurve of Aberdonia was obtained from photometric observations at the Palomar Transient Factory in California. Lightcurve analysis gave a rotation period of 5.0813 hours with a brightness amplitude of 0.20 magnitude (U=2).

=== Diameter and albedo ===
According to the NEOWISE mission of NASA's space-based Wide-field Infrared Survey Explorer, Aberdonia measures 8.8 kilometers in diameter and its surface has an albedo of 0.25, while the Collaborative Asteroid Lightcurve Link assumes an albedo of 0.24 and calculates a diameter of 8.2 kilometers with an absolute magnitude of 12.6.

== Naming ==
This minor planet was named for the Scottish University of Aberdeen on its 500th anniversary in 1995. James Clerk Maxwell and George Paget Thomson are the university's best known former holders of chairs of natural philosophy. James Gregory (1638–1675), inventor of an early reflecting telescope, was an alumnus of Marischal College, which later merged into the University of Aberdeen.

The university is also known for its first chair of medicine in the English-speaking world, and for having taught astronomy already in the late 16th century. The approved naming citation was published by the Minor Planet Center on 15 February 1995 (M.P.C. 24765).
