= 2648 Owa =

Background asteroid from the Flora region of the inner asteroid belt

Discovery
- Discovered by: E. Bowell
- Discovery site: Anderson Mesa Stn.
- Discovery date: 8 November 1980

Designations
- Named after: "rock" in Hopi
- Alternative designations: 1980 VJ · 1926 VD; 1953 TJ
- Minor planet category: main-belt · (inner); Flora · background

Orbital characteristics
- Epoch 23 March 2018 (JD 2458200.5)
- Uncertainty parameter 0
- Observation arc: 91.29 yr (33,345 d)
- Aphelion: 2.6438 AU
- Perihelion: 1.8565 AU
- Semi-major axis: 2.2502 AU
- Eccentricity: 0.1749
- Orbital period (sidereal): 3.38 yr (1,233 d)
- Mean anomaly: 12.319°
- Mean motion: 0° 17^{m} 31.2^{s} / day
- Inclination: 4.7966°
- Longitude of ascending node: 279.91°
- Argument of perihelion: 131.33°

Physical characteristics
- Mean diameter: 5.40±0.25 km 5.76±0.91 km 5.933±0.160 km 6.81 km (calculated)
- Synodic rotation period: 3.56±0.01 h 3.563±0.002 h (Note: Higgins (2012) web: rotation period 3.563±0.002 hours with a brightness amplitude of 0.35±0.02 mag. Quality code of 3. Summary figures at the LCDB); 3.563 h 3.5641±0.0001 h (Note: Pravec (Oct 2007) web: rotation period 3.5641±0.0001 hours with a brightness amplitude of 0.23±0.02 mag. Quality Code is 3. Summary figures at the LCDB and Pravec, P.; Wolf, M.; Sarounova, L. (2007)) (Note: Lightcurve plot-A and plot-B of (2648) Owa from Ondrejov data obtained by the NEO Photometric Program and collaborating projects.); 3.567±0.002 h
- Geometric albedo: 0.24 (assumed); 0.38±0.17; 0.4174±0.0904; 0.459±0.029
- Spectral type: S (assumed)
- Absolute magnitude (H): 12.7 · 12.80; 12.88±0.32; 12.90 · 13.0

2648 Owa, provisional designation 1980 VJ, is a background asteroid from the Flora region of the inner asteroid belt, approximately 6 kilometers (4 miles) in diameter. It was discovered on 8 November 1980, by American astronomer Edward Bowell at the Anderson Mesa Station near Flagstaff, Arizona, in the United States. The presumably S-type asteroid has a rotation period of 3.56 hours. It was named for the word "rock" in the Native American Hopi language.

== Orbit and classification ==
Owa is a non-family asteroid of the main belt's background population when applying the hierarchical clustering method to its proper orbital elements. Based on osculating Keplerian orbital elements, the asteroid has also been classified as a member of the Flora family (402), a giant asteroid family and the largest family of stony asteroids in the main-belt.

It orbits the Sun in the inner main-belt at a distance of 1.9–2.6 AU once every 3 years and 5 months (1,233 days; semi-major axis of 2.25 AU). Its orbit has an eccentricity of 0.17 and an inclination of 5° with respect to the ecliptic. The asteroid was first observed as 1926 VD at Heidelberg Observatory in November 1926. The body's observation arc begins at Turku Observatory in October 1953, more than 27 years prior to its official discovery observation at Anderson Mesa.

== Physical characteristics ==
Owa is an assumed, stony S-type asteroid.

=== Rotation period ===
In 2007, four rotational lightcurves of Owa were obtained from photometric observations by James W. Brinsfield at Via Capote Observatory (G69), by astronomers at the National Undergraduate Research Observatory (NURO), as well as by Petr Pravec and Pierre Antonini (U=3-/3-/3/3). In 2012, another lightcurve was obtained by David Higgins (U=3). The consolidated result gave a rotation period of 3.5641 hours with a brightness amplitude between 0.20 and 0.35 magnitude (U=3).

=== Diameter and albedo ===
According to the survey carried out by the NEOWISE mission of NASA's Wide-field Infrared Survey Explorer, Owa measures between 5.40 and 5.933 kilometers in diameter and its surface has an albedo between 0.38 and 0.459.

The Collaborative Asteroid Lightcurve Link assumes an albedo of 0.24 – derived from 8 Flora, the parent body of the Flora family – and calculates a diameter of 6.81 kilometers based on an absolute magnitude of 13.0.

== Naming ==
This minor planet was named after the Hopi word for "rock". The Hopi are a Native American tribe, who primarily live on the Hopi Reservation in northern Arizona. The asteroid's name was suggested by German-American linguist Ekkehart Malotki. The official naming citation was published by the Minor Planet Center on 1 December 1982 (M.P.C. 7473).
