= 2554 Skiff =

Florian asteroid

Discovery
- Discovered by: E. Bowell
- Discovery site: Anderson Mesa Stn.
- Discovery date: 17 July 1980

Designations
- Named after: Brian Skiff (American astronomer)
- Alternative designations: 1980 OB · 1931 AB; 1970 RE · 1976 GK_{8} 1976 HV
- Minor planet category: main-belt · (inner); Flora · Levin

Orbital characteristics
- Epoch 23 March 2018 (JD 2458200.5)
- Uncertainty parameter 0
- Observation arc: 64.13 yr (23,423 d)
- Aphelion: 2.5915 AU
- Perihelion: 1.9355 AU
- Semi-major axis: 2.2635 AU
- Eccentricity: 0.1449
- Orbital period (sidereal): 3.41 yr (1,244 d)
- Mean anomaly: 57.298°
- Mean motion: 0° 17^{m} 21.84^{s} / day
- Inclination: 4.8597°
- Longitude of ascending node: 296.38°
- Argument of perihelion: 333.74°

Physical characteristics
- Mean diameter: 6.005±0.052 km 6.23±1.03 km 6.283±0.049 km 7.82 km (calculated); 8.56±0.57 km
- Synodic rotation period: 25.6±0.5 h
- Geometric albedo: 0.153±0.022; 0.24 (assumed); 0.334±0.139; 0.4489±0.0796
- Spectral type: S (assumed)
- Absolute magnitude (H): 12.5; 12.51±0.31; 12.70; 13.00

2554 Skiff, provisional designation 1980 OB, is a Florian asteroid from the inner regions of the asteroid belt, approximately 7 kilometers (4.3 miles) in diameter. It was discovered on 17 July 1980, by American astronomer Edward Bowell at Lowell's Anderson Mesa Station near Flagstaff, Arizona. The presumed S-type asteroid has a rotation period of 25.6 hours and was named after astronomer Brian Skiff.

== Orbit and classification ==
Skiff is a member of the Flora family (402), a giant asteroid family and the largest family of stony asteroids in the main-belt. Based on an alternative HCM-classification, the Asteroid Dynamic Site groups this asteroid to the core members of the Levin family, a proposed Florian subfamily of 1145 bodies which is named after its parent body 2076 Levin.

It orbits the Sun in the inner main-belt at a distance of 1.9–2.6 AU once every 3 years and 5 months (1,244 days; semi-major axis of 2.26 AU). Its orbit has an eccentricity of 0.14 and an inclination of 5° with respect to the ecliptic. The asteroid was first observed as 1931 AB at Heidelberg Observatory in January 1931. The body's observation arc begins with a precovery taken at Palomar Observatory in June 1953, more than 27 years prior to its official discovery observation at Anderson Mesa.

== Physical characteristics ==
Skiff is an assumed stony S-type asteroid, which is also the overall spectral type of the Flora family.

=== Rotation period ===
In August 2014, a rotational lightcurve of Skiff was obtained from photometric observations by Italian astronomers at the Franco Fuligni Observatory near Rome. It gave a provisional rotation period of 25.6 hours with a brightness amplitude of 0.32 in magnitude (U=1).

=== Diameter and albedo ===
According to the surveys carried out by the Japanese Akari satellite and the NEOWISE mission of NASA's Wide-field Infrared Survey Explorer, Skiff measures between 6.005 and 8.56 kilometers in diameter and its surface has an albedo between 0.153 and 0.4489.

The Collaborative Asteroid Lightcurve Link assumes an albedo of 0.24 – derived from 8 Flora, the Flora family's parent body – and calculates a diameter of 7.82 kilometers based on an absolute magnitude of 12.7.

== Naming ==
Skiff was named in honor of American astronomer Brian A. Skiff, a discoverer of 60 minor planets. He significantly contributed to Lowell's asteroid astrometry program, including the rediscovery of the 800-meter potentially hazardous object 69230 Hermes, a long-lost asteroid. The official naming citation was published by the Minor Planet Center on 8 April 1982 (M.P.C. 6834).
