= 3673 Levy =

Main-belt asteroid

Discovery
- Discovered by: E. Bowell
- Discovery site: Anderson Mesa Stn.
- Discovery date: 22 August 1985

Designations
- Named after: David H. Levy (Canadian astronomer)
- Alternative designations: 1985 QS · 1969 ER; 1978 SW_{5} · 1978 WN
- Minor planet category: main-belt · Flora

Orbital characteristics
- Epoch 4 September 2017 (JD 2458000.5)
- Uncertainty parameter 0
- Observation arc: 47.32 yr (17,284 days)
- Aphelion: 2.7791 AU
- Perihelion: 1.9108 AU
- Semi-major axis: 2.3450 AU
- Eccentricity: 0.1851
- Orbital period (sidereal): 3.59 yr (1,312 days)
- Mean anomaly: 280.30°
- Mean motion: 0° 16^{m} 28.2^{s} / day
- Inclination: 7.0907°
- Longitude of ascending node: 13.369°
- Argument of perihelion: 45.035°
- Known satellites: 1 (Note: CBAT No. 1165, (3673) Levy, 12 December 2007 Photometric observations obtained during 5–9 December 2007, show that 3673 Levy is a binary system with an orbital period of 21.6 hours. The primary has a period of 2.6879±0.0005 hours, and it has a lightcurve brightness variation of 0.13 magnitude, indicative of a nearly spheroidal shape. Mutual eclipse/occultation events suggest a secondary-to-primary mean-diameter ratio of 0.28±0.03. further observations are required to refined the binary system's parameters. Reported by: D. Pray, Carbuncle Hill Observatory, Greene, RI, U.S.A.; P. Pravec and P. Kusnirak, Ondrejov Observatory; and R. Stephens, Goat Mountain Astronomical Research Station, Yucca Valley, CA, U.S.A. Central Bureau for Astronomical Telegrams No. 1165)

Physical characteristics
- Dimensions: 5.80±0.20 km 6.412±0.159 km 6.468 km 6.47 km (taken)
- Synodic rotation period: 2.68748±0.00007 h (Note: Pravec (2007) web: rotation period 2.68748±0.00007 hours with a brightness amplitude of 0.13 mag. The secondary body has an orbital period of 21.67 hours. Summary figures for (3673) Levy at Collaborative Asteroid Lightcurve Link (CALL) and Pravec, P.; Wolf, M.; Sarounova, L. (2007)); 2.6879±0.0005 h
- Geometric albedo: 0.2341; 0.2472±0.0325; 0.398±0.035
- Spectral type: S
- Absolute magnitude (H): 12.65±0.06 (R) · 12.80 · 12.9 · 13.1 · 13.14±0.078 · 13.30±0.31

3673 Levy, provisional designation 1985 QS, is a binary Flora asteroid from the inner regions of the asteroid belt, approximately 6 kilometers in diameter. It was discovered on 22 August 1985, by American astronomer Edward Bowell at Lowell's Anderson Mesa Station near Flagstaff, Arizona, United States. The asteroid was named after Canadian astronomer David H. Levy.

== Classification and orbit ==
The S-type asteroid is a member of the Flora family, one of the largest groups of stony asteroids in the main-belt. Levy orbits the Sun in the inner main-belt at a distance of 1.9–2.8 AU once every 3 years and 7 months (1,312 days). Its orbit has an eccentricity of 0.19 and an inclination of 7° with respect to the ecliptic. It was first identified as "1969 ER" at Crimea–Nauchnij in 1969, extending its observation arc by 16 years prior to the official discovery observation.

== Lightcurve ==
In December 2007, astronomers from the U.S. Carbuncle Hill Observatory (I00) in Rhode Island, the Czech Ondřejov Observatory, and the Californian Goat Mountain Astronomical Research Station (G79) obtained a rotational lightcurve showing Levy to turn on its axis every 2.688 hours. The low brightness variation of 0.13 magnitude indicates that the body has a nearly spheroidal shape (U=3). During the photometric observations, it was also discovered that Levy is a binary asteroid, orbited every 21.67 hours by a satellite, which approximately measures 28±3 % of Levy's diameter (1.8 kilometer).

== Diameter and albedo ==
According to the survey carried out by NASA's Wide-field Infrared Survey Explorer with its subsequent NEOWISE mission, Levy measures between 5.80 and 6.47 kilometers in diameter and its surface has an albedo between 0.234 and 0.398. The Collaborative Asteroid Lightcurve Link agrees with the revised WISE-results by Pravec and adopts an albedo of 0.2341 and a diameter of 6.47 kilometers with an absolute magnitude of 13.14.

== Naming ==
This minor planet was named in honor of Canadian astronomer David H. Levy (b. 1948), a discoverer of minor planets and comets and a highly committed observer, who uses a large repertoire of observational techniques. He is also an educator and author, known for his biographies of astronomers and for his launched educational programs, bringing observational astronomy to the broader public. The approved naming citation was published by the Minor Planet Center on 2 April 1988 (M.P.C. 12974).

He is one of the most successful comet discoverers in history. He has discovered 22 comets, nine of them using his own backyard telescopes. With Eugene and Carolyn Shoemaker at the Palomar Observatory in California he discovered Shoemaker-Levy 9, the comet that collided with Jupiter in 1994. That episode produced the most spectacular explosions ever witnessed in the Solar System. Levy is currently involved with the Jarnac Comet Survey, which is based at the Jarnac Observatory (G92) in Vail, Arizona, but which has telescopes planned for locations around the world.
