= 3131 Mason-Dixon =

Minor planet

3131 Mason–Dixon
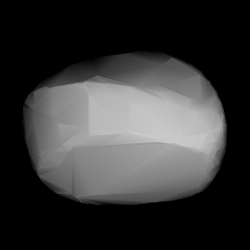
- Mason–Dixon modeled from its lightcurve

Discovery
- Discovered by: E. Bowell
- Discovery site: Anderson Mesa Stn.
- Discovery date: 24 January 1982

Designations
- Named after: Charles Mason; Jeremiah Dixon (English astronomers)
- Alternative designations: 1982 BM_{1} · 1962 CK; 1975 XS_{2} · 1977 DB_{3} 1979 OS_{16} · 1979 QJ_{6} A922 DC
- Minor planet category: main-belt · (outer); Koronis

Orbital characteristics
- Epoch 27 April 2019 (JD 2458600.5)
- Uncertainty parameter 0
- Observation arc: 63.82 yr (23,311 d)
- Aphelion: 3.0505 AU
- Perihelion: 2.7940 AU
- Semi-major axis: 2.9222 AU
- Eccentricity: 0.0439
- Orbital period (sidereal): 5.00 yr (1,825 d)
- Mean anomaly: 118.17°
- Mean motion: 0° 11^{m} 50.28^{s} / day
- Inclination: 2.4041°
- Longitude of ascending node: 44.734°
- Argument of perihelion: 147.18°

Physical characteristics
- Mean diameter: 14 km (est. at 0.15)
- Synodic rotation period: 19.748±0.0537 h
- Geometric albedo: 0.15 (family albedo)
- Spectral type: S (family based)
- Absolute magnitude (H): 12.0

3131 Mason–Dixon (prov. designation: 1982 BM_{1}) is a Koronian asteroid from the outer regions of the asteroid belt. It was discovered on 24 January 1982, by American astronomer Edward Bowell at Lowell's Anderson Mesa Station in Arizona, United States. The likely S-type asteroid has a rotation period of 19.7 hours and measures approximately 14 kilometers (9 miles) in diameter. It was named for English astronomers Charles Mason and Jeremiah Dixon.

== Orbit and classification ==
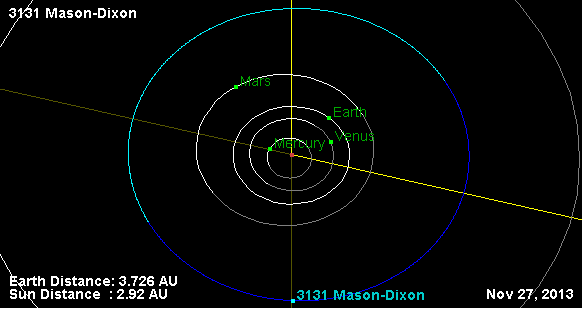
Orbital diagram of Mason–Dixon

Mason–Dixon is a core member of the Koronis family (605), a very large asteroid family of almost 6,000 known asteroids with nearly co-planar ecliptical orbits. It orbits the Sun in the outer main-belt at a distance of 2.8–3.1 AU once every 5 years (1,825 days; semi-major axis of 2.92 AU). Its orbit has an eccentricity of 0.04 and an inclination of 2° with respect to the ecliptic.

The body was first observed at Heidelberg Observatory in February 1922. Its observation arc begins with a precovery taken at Palomar Observatory in July 1954. On 1 February 1907, Mason–Dixon made a close approach to one of the larger asteroids, 52 Europa. At its closest, it passed Europa within 1.1 million kilometers.

== Naming ==
This minor planet was named by the discoverer in memory of English astronomers Charles Mason (1728–1786) and Jeremiah Dixon (1733–1779), who observed the 1761 transit of Venus from the Cape of Good Hope. Between 1763 and 1767 they surveyed the so-called Mason–Dixon line, the boundary between the US States of Pennsylvania and Maryland. The official naming citation was published by the Minor Planet Center on 22 June 1986 (M.P.C. 10847).

== Physical characteristics ==
The asteroid's spectral type has not been determined. Due its membership to the stony Koronis family, Mason–Dixon is likely a common S-type asteroid.

=== Rotation period ===
In January 2012, a rotational lightcurve of Mason–Dixon was obtained from photometric observations by astronomers at the Palomar Transient Factory in California. Lightcurve analysis gave a rotation period of 19.748±0.0537 hours with a high brightness variation of 0.70 magnitude (U=2), indicative of an elongated, non-spherical shape. Another fragmentary lightcurve by Maurice Clark at Preston Gott Observatory in September 2014 gave a less accurate period of 10.20 hours with an amplitude of 0.75 magnitude.

=== Diameter and albedo ===
Assuming a typical albedo of 0.15 for members of the Koronis family, Mason–Dixon measures 14 kilometers based on an absolute magnitude of 12.00. The Collaborative Asteroid Lightcurve Link assumes an albedo of a carbonaceous asteroid of 0.057 and consequently calculates a larger diameter of 18.6 kilometers.
