= 13003 Dickbeasley =

Background asteroid from the central region of the asteroid belt

Discovery
- Discovered by: E. Bowell
- Discovery site: Anderson Mesa Stn.
- Discovery date: 21 March 1982

Designations
- Named after: Dick Beasley (NAU, artist)
- Alternative designations: 1982 FN · 1982 HJ_{2}
- Minor planet category: main-belt · (inner) background

Orbital characteristics
- Epoch 4 September 2017 (JD 2458000.5)
- Uncertainty parameter 0
- Observation arc: 34.66 yr (12,661 days)
- Aphelion: 3.0838 AU
- Perihelion: 2.0332 AU
- Semi-major axis: 2.5585 AU
- Eccentricity: 0.2053
- Orbital period (sidereal): 4.09 yr (1,495 days)
- Mean anomaly: 227.37°
- Mean motion: 0° 14^{m} 26.88^{s} / day
- Inclination: 26.560°
- Longitude of ascending node: 177.56°
- Argument of perihelion: 33.358°

Physical characteristics
- Mean diameter: 5.41 km (calculated); 8.240±0.119 km
- Synodic rotation period: 3.4992±0.0090 h 3.4999±0.0005 h 3.502±0.001 h
- Geometric albedo: 0.074±0.011; 0.20 (assumed)
- Spectral type: S (assumed)
- Absolute magnitude (H): 13.7 · 14.402±0.008 (S) · 14.25±0.89

13003 Dickbeasley, provisional designation 1982 FN, is a background asteroid from the central region of the asteroid belt, approximately 6 kilometers in diameter. It was discovered by American astronomer Edward Bowell at Lowell's Anderson Mesa Station on 21 March 1982. The asteroid was named in memory of American NAU administrator Dick Beasley.

== Orbit and classification ==
Dickbeasley is a non-family asteroid from the main belt's background population. It orbits the Sun in the central main-belt at a distance of 2.0–3.1 AU once every 4 years and 1 month (1,495 days). Its orbit has an eccentricity of 0.21 and an inclination of 27° with respect to the ecliptic. The body's observation arc begins with its official discovery observation, as no precoveries were taken, and no prior identifications were made.

== Naming ==
This minor planet was named in memory of American Richard "Dick" E. Beasley (1934–1992), a teacher and administrator at Northern Arizona University. He was also a multi-media artist and a preeminent figure in the calligraphic world. The approved naming citation was published by the Minor Planet Center on 9 February 2009 (M.P.C. 65122).

== Physical characteristics ==
=== Rotation period ===
In April 2015, a rotational lightcurve of Dickbeasley was obtained from photometric observations made at the Phillips Academy Observatory (I12). It gave a rotation period of 3.502 hours with a brightness variation of 0.44 magnitude (U=3-). One month later, in May 2015, observations at Texas Tech's Preston Gott Observatory gave a concurring period of 3.4999 hours with an amplitude of 0.30 magnitude (U=3-).

These results supersede the first obtained lightcurve at the Palomar Transient Factory from September 2012, which gave a period of 3.4992 hours and an amplitude of 0.42 (U=2).

=== Diameter and albedo ===
According to the surveys carried out by the NEOWISE mission of NASA's space-based Wide-field Infrared Survey Explorer, Dickbeasley measures 8.2 kilometers in diameter and its surface has an albedo of 0.07, while he Collaborative Asteroid Lightcurve Link assumes a standard albedo for stony asteroids of 0.20 and calculates a diameter of 5.4 kilometers with an absolute magnitude of 13.7.
