= 3350 =

3350 may refer to:

- A.D. 3350, a year in the 4th millennium CE
- 3350 BC, a year in the 4th millennium BCE
- 3350, a number in the 3000 (number) range

== Other uses ==
- 3350 Scobee, an asteroid in the Asteroid Belt, the 3350th asteroid registered
- IBM 3350, a hard disk drive unit
- Nokia 3350, a cellphone
- Texas Farm to Market Road 3350, a state highway
- Wright R-3350 Duplex-Cyclone, an American radial aircraft engine displacing nearly 3,350 cubic inches
