= 3247 Di Martino =

Main-belt asteroid

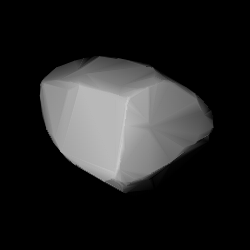
- Shape model of Di Martino from its lightcurve

Discovery
- Discovered by: E. Bowell
- Discovery site: Anderson Mesa Stn.
- Discovery date: 30 December 1981

Designations
- Named after: Mario di Martino (Italian astronomer)
- Alternative designations: 1981 YE · 1968 HR; 1979 HO_{1} · A909 BL
- Minor planet category: main-belt · (inner); Nysa–Polana complex

Orbital characteristics
- Epoch 23 March 2018 (JD 2458200.5)
- Uncertainty parameter 0
- Observation arc: 109.09 yr (39,844 d)
- Aphelion: 2.6824 AU
- Perihelion: 2.0727 AU
- Semi-major axis: 2.3776 AU
- Eccentricity: 0.1282
- Orbital period (sidereal): 3.67 yr (1,339 d)
- Mean anomaly: 229.54°
- Mean motion: 0° 16^{m} 7.68^{s} / day
- Inclination: 3.9342°
- Longitude of ascending node: 45.601°
- Argument of perihelion: 146.34°

Physical characteristics
- Mean diameter: 11.267±2.644 km 11.74±3.06 km 12.42±2.19 km 13.60±5.23 km 13.72 km (derived); 13.75±1.0 km 15.60±0.51 km
- Synodic rotation period: 5.443±0.0014 h 5.4446±0.0007 h 5.445 h 5.44517±0.00005 h
- Pole ecliptic latitude: (53.0°, −70.0°) (λ_{1}/β_{1}); (231.0°, −75.0°) (λ_{2}/β_{2})
- Geometric albedo: 0.05±0.10; 0.053±0.004; 0.0540 (derived); 0.060±0.060; 0.0647±0.011; 0.08±0.09; 0.0925±0.0544
- Spectral type: S (assumed)
- Absolute magnitude (H): 12.90; 13.00; 13.1; 13.116±0.003 (R); 13.26; 13.51

3247 Di Martino (prov. designation: 1981 YE) is a dark Nysa family asteroid from the inner regions of the asteroid belt. It was discovered on 30 December 1981, by American astronomer Edward Bowell at Lowell's Anderson Mesa Station near Flagstaff, Arizona, in the United States. The asteroid has a rotation period of 5.4 hours and measures approximately 13 kilometers (8 miles) in diameter. It was named for Italian astronomer Mario di Martino.

== Orbit and classification ==
Di Martino orbits the Sun in the inner main-belt at a distance of 2.1–2.7 AU once every 3 years and 8 months (1,339 days; semi-major axis of 2.38 AU). Its orbit has an eccentricity of 0.13 and an inclination of 4° with respect to the ecliptic. Di Martino is member of the Nysa–Polana complex, a collection of overlapping asteroid families. Its low albedo (see below) suggests it likely belongs to the New Polana family of carbonaceous asteroids within the complex. The body's observation arc begins with its first observation as A909 BL at Heidelberg Observatory in January 1909, almost 73 years prior to its official discovery observation at Anderson Mesa.

== Naming ==
This minor planet was named after Mario di Martino (born 1947), Italian astronomer and photometrist of lightcurves at the Turin Observatory. The official naming proposed by the discoverer. The citation was prepared by Alain Harris and published by the Minor Planet Center on 14 April 1987 (M.P.C. 11749).

== Physical characteristics ==
Di Martino is an assumed S-type asteroid, while its low albedo indicates a carbonaceous composition.

=== Rotation period ===
Three rotational lightcurve of Di Martino have been obtained from photometric observations by French amateur astronomer Pierre Antonini and at the Palomar Transient Factory and Haute Provence Observatory (U=2/3/3). Lightcurve analysis gave a rotation period of 5.445 hours with a consolidated brightness amplitude between 0.32 and 0.51 magnitude (U=2/3/3), indicative of a somewhat elongated shape.

In 2016, a modeled lightcurve gave a concurring sidereal period of 5.44517 hours using photometric data from a large international collaboration of astronomers. The study also determined two spin axes of (53.0°, −70.0°) and (231.0°, −75.0°) in ecliptic coordinates (λ, β).

=== Diameter and albedo ===
According to the surveys carried out by the Infrared Astronomical Satellite IRAS, the Japanese Akari satellite and the NEOWISE mission of NASA's Wide-field Infrared Survey Explorer, Di Martino measures between 11.267 and 15.60 kilometers in diameter and its surface has an albedo between 0.05 and 0.0925. The Collaborative Asteroid Lightcurve Link derives an albedo of 0.0540 and a diameter of 13.72 kilometers based on an absolute magnitude of 13.1.
