= 4822 Karge =

Asteroid

Discovery
- Discovered by: E. Bowell
- Discovery site: Lowell Obs.
- Discovery date: 4 October 1986

Designations
- Named after: Orville B. Karge (physics teacher)
- Alternative designations: 1986 TC_{1} · 1979 QM_{5} 1979 QO
- Minor planet category: main-belt · inner

Orbital characteristics
- Epoch 4 September 2017 (JD 2458000.5)
- Uncertainty parameter 0
- Observation arc: 45.67 yr (16,681 days)
- Aphelion: 2.6713 AU
- Perihelion: 1.8335 AU
- Semi-major axis: 2.2524 AU
- Eccentricity: 0.1860
- Orbital period (sidereal): 3.38 yr (1,235 days)
- Mean anomaly: 31.263°
- Mean motion: 0° 17^{m} 29.76^{s} / day
- Inclination: 4.0502°
- Longitude of ascending node: 141.41°
- Argument of perihelion: 264.30°

Physical characteristics
- Dimensions: 4.335±0.194 km
- Geometric albedo: 0.341±0.056
- Absolute magnitude (H): 13.7

4822 Karge, provisional designation 1986 TC_{1}, is a bright asteroid from the inner regions of the asteroid belt, approximately 4 kilometers in diameter. It was discovered on 4 October 1986, by American astronomer Edward Bowell at the Anderson Mesa Station of the Lowell Observatory in Flagstaff, Arizona. The asteroid was later named after American physics teacher Orville Karge.

== Orbit and classification ==
Karge orbits the Sun in the inner main-belt at a distance of 1.8–2.7 AU once every 3 years and 5 months (1,235 days). Its orbit has an eccentricity of 0.19 and an inclination of 4° with respect to the ecliptic. first precovery was taken at the Palomar Observatory in 1971, extending the body's observation arc by 15 years prior to its official discovery observation.

== Physical characteristics ==
=== Diameter and albedo ===
According to the survey carried out by the NEOWISE mission of NASA's Wide-field Infrared Survey Explorer, Karge measures 4.335 kilometers in diameter and its surface has a high albedo of 0.341. It has an absolute magnitude of 13.7.

=== Lightcurve ===
As of 2017, no rotational lightcurve of Karge has been obtained from photometric observations. The body's rotation period, poles and shape remains unknown.

== Naming ==
This minor planet was named after Orville B. Karge (1919–1990), a teacher of physics in San Diego, California. The official naming citation was published by the Minor Planet Center on 21 November 1991 (M.P.C. 19340).
