= Richard P. Binzel =

American astronomer

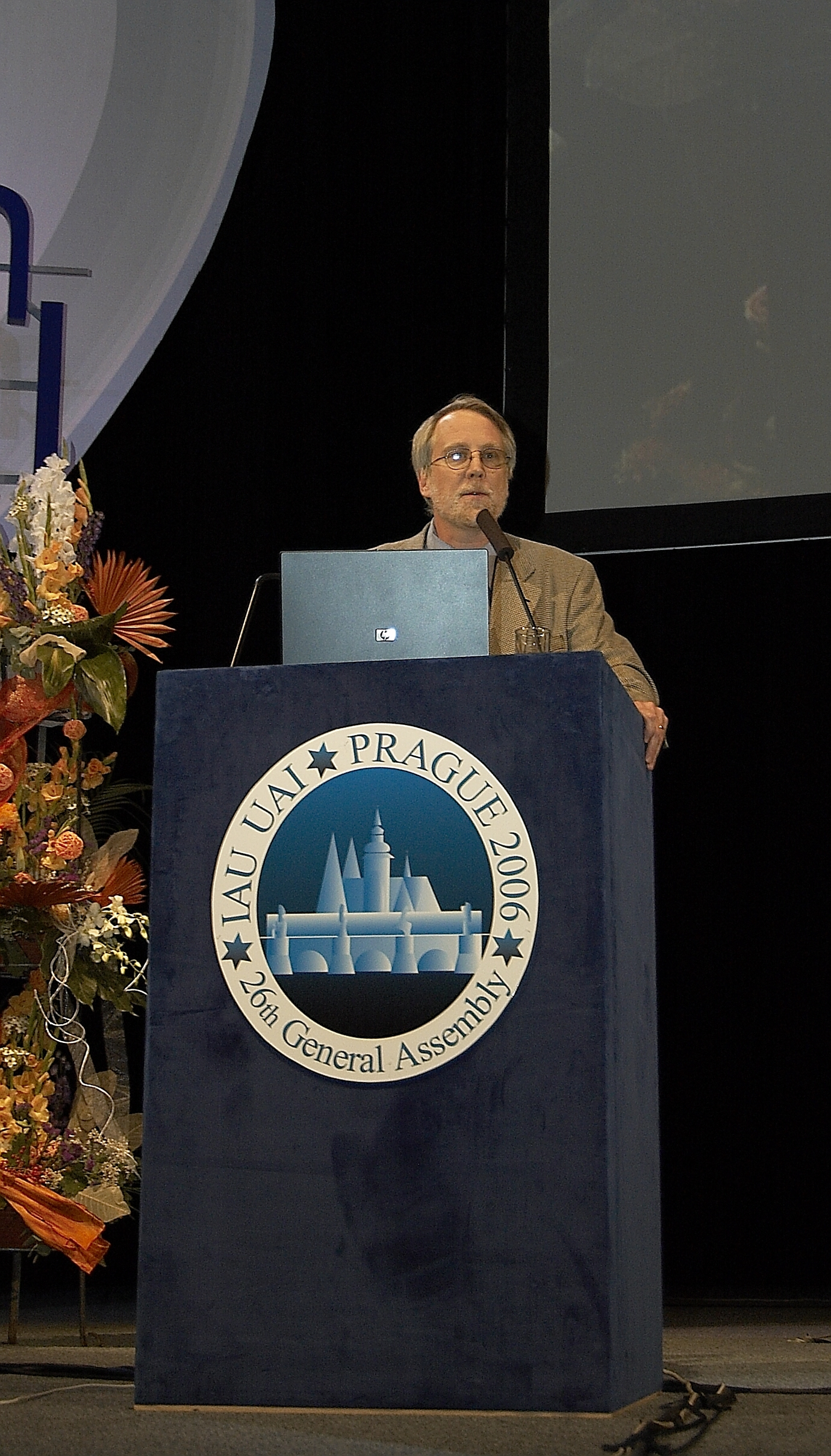
- Born: 1958 (age 67–68)
- Citizenship: US
- Occupations: Planetary science, astronomy
- Organization: Massachusetts Institute of Technology
- Known for: Torino Scale

Richard "Rick" P. Binzel (born 1958) is an American astronomer and professor of planetary sciences at the Massachusetts Institute of Technology (MIT). He is a discoverer of minor planets, photometrist and the inventor of the Torino Scale, a method for categorizing the impact hazard associated with near-Earth objects such as asteroids and comets. He is also a frequent trip leader for the MIT Alumni Association.

== Biography and honors ==
Minor planets discovered: 3
| 11868 Kleinrichert | October 2, 1989 | cite |
| 13014 Hasslacher | November 17, 1987 | cite |
| 29196 Dius | December 19, 1990 | list |

Binzel was awarded the H. C. Urey Prize by the American Astronomical Society in 1991. He also was awarded a "MacVicar Faculty Fellowship" for teaching excellence at MIT in 1994. He is a co-investigator on the OSIRIS-REx mission.

Binzel was on the "Planet Definition Committee" that developed the proposal to the International Astronomical Union's meeting in Prague in 2006 on whether Pluto should be considered a planet. Their proposal was revised during the meeting and Pluto is now considered a dwarf planet. However, Richard Binzel has strong feelings contrary to this collective decision and would prefer for Pluto to still be classified as having full planet status.

Binzel is an editor of the books Seventy-five years of Hirayama asteroid families : the role of collisions in the Solar System history ISBN 0-937707-82-1 and Asteroids II ISBN 0-8165-1123-3. He is General Editor of the University of Arizona Space Science Series.

Richard Binzel assists his family in raising guide dog puppies for Guiding Eyes for the Blind. His favorite dog was their fourth, Skyler. He is also a frequent leader with the MIT Alumni Association.

The main-belt asteroid 2873 Binzel, discovered by Edward Bowell at Anderson Mesa Station, was named in his honor.

== See also ==
- 2024 PT5
