= 5951 Alicemonet =

Main-belt asteroid

Discovery
- Discovered by: E. Bowell
- Discovery site: Anderson Mesa Stn.
- Discovery date: 7 October 1986

Designations
- Named after: Alice Monet (American astronomer)
- Alternative designations: 1986 TZ_{1} · 1973 SJ_{5} 1983 XE_{1}
- Minor planet category: main-belt · Flora

Orbital characteristics
- Epoch 4 September 2017 (JD 2458000.5)
- Uncertainty parameter 0
- Observation arc: 65.34 yr (23,867 days)
- Aphelion: 2.6774 AU
- Perihelion: 1.7183 AU
- Semi-major axis: 2.1979 AU
- Eccentricity: 0.2182
- Orbital period (sidereal): 3.26 yr (1,190 days)
- Mean anomaly: 175.97°
- Mean motion: 0° 18^{m} 9^{s} / day
- Inclination: 5.3707°
- Longitude of ascending node: 88.382°
- Argument of perihelion: 286.18°
- Earth MOID: 0.7287 AU

Physical characteristics
- Dimensions: 5.894±0.040; 5.93 km (calculated); 5.990±0.053 km
- Synodic rotation period: 3.8871±0.0005 h
- Geometric albedo: 0.24 (assumed); 0.2840±0.0307; 0.293±0.040
- Spectral type: S
- Absolute magnitude (H): 13.2 · 13.1 · 13.19±0.17 · 13.3

5951 Alicemonet, provisional designation 1986 TZ_{1}, is a stony Flora asteroid approximately 6 kilometres in diameter from the inner regions of the asteroid belt. It was discovered on 7 October 1986, by American astronomer Edward Bowell at Anderson Mesa Station of the Lowell Observatory in Flagstaff, Arizona. The asteroid was named after American astronomer Alice Monet.

== Orbit and classification ==
Alicemonet is a member of the Flora family, one of the largest groups of stony asteroids in the main-belt. It orbits the Sun in the inner main-belt at a distance of 1.7–2.7 AU once every 3 years and 3 months (1,190 days). Its orbit has an eccentricity of 0.22 and an inclination of 5° with respect to the ecliptic.

A first precovery was obtained at Palomar Observatory in 1952, extending the body's observation arc by 34 years prior to its official discovery observation at Anderson Mesa.

== Physical characteristics ==
=== Lightcurves ===
In September 2012, a rotational lightcurve of Alicemonet was obtained using the SARA telescope at Cerro Tololo, Chile. The photometric observations gave a well-defined rotation period of 3.8871 hours with a brightness variation of 0.46 magnitude (U=3).

=== Diameter and albedo ===
According to the survey carried out by the NEOWISE mission of NASA's space-based Wide-field Infrared Survey Explorer, Alicemonet measures between 5.89 and 5.99 kilometers in diameter and its surface has an albedo of 0.284 and 0.293, respectively.

The Collaborative Asteroid Lightcurve Link assumes a stony albedo of 0.24 – derived from 8 Flora, the largest member and namesake of this orbital family – and calculates a diameter of 5.9 kilometers with an absolute magnitude of 13.3.

== Naming ==
This minor planet was named after American astronomer Alice K. B. Monet (born 1954) at the United States Naval Observatory Flagstaff Station and former chair of the Division on Dynamical Astronomy of the AAS. She contributed to the NEAR Shoemaker and Galileo Mission and is known for her numerous astrometric observations. The approved naming citation was published by the Minor Planet Center on 1 July 1996 (M.P.C. 27460).
