= 2598 Merlin =

Carbonaceous Dorian asteroid

Discovery
- Discovered by: E. Bowell
- Discovery site: Anderson Mesa Stn.
- Discovery date: 7 September 1980

Designations
- Named after: Merlin (Arthurian legend)
- Alternative designations: 1980 RY · 1948 WH; 1971 TD_{3}
- Minor planet category: main-belt · Dora

Orbital characteristics
- Epoch 4 September 2017 (JD 2458000.5)
- Uncertainty parameter 0
- Observation arc: 68.44 yr (24,998 days)
- Aphelion: 3.3861 AU
- Perihelion: 2.1757 AU
- Semi-major axis: 2.7809 AU
- Eccentricity: 0.2176
- Orbital period (sidereal): 4.64 yr (1,694 days)
- Mean anomaly: 297.39°
- Mean motion: 0° 12^{m} 45^{s} / day
- Inclination: 7.7767°
- Longitude of ascending node: 197.77°
- Argument of perihelion: 217.28°

Physical characteristics
- Dimensions: 15.694±0.047 km
- Geometric albedo: 0.049±0.010
- Spectral type: SMASS = Ch
- Absolute magnitude (H): 13.2

2598 Merlin, provisional designation 1980 RY, is a carbonaceous Dorian asteroid from the central regions of the asteroid belt, approximately 16 kilometers in diameter. It was discovered on 7 September 1980, by American astronomer Edward Bowell at Lowell's Anderson Mesa Station in Flagstaff, Arizona, United States. The asteroid was named after the legendary wizard Merlin in Arthurian legend.

== Classification and orbit ==
Merlin is a member of the Dora family (512), a well-established central asteroid family of more than 1,200 carbonaceous asteroids. The family's namesake is 668 Dora. It is alternatively known as the "Zhongolovich family", named after its presumably largest member 1734 Zhongolovich. The Dora family may also contain a subfamily.

Merlin orbits the Sun in the central main-belt at a distance of 2.2–3.4 AU once every 4 years and 8 months (1,694 days). Its orbit has an eccentricity of 0.22 and an inclination of 8° with respect to the ecliptic. In Nombember 1948, the asteroid was first identified 1948 WH at Uccle Observatory, where the body's observation arc begins 32 years prior to its official discovery observation at Anderson Mesa.

== Physical characteristics ==
In the SMASS classification, Merlin a Ch-type asteroid, a hydrated subtype of the broader carbonaceous C-complex.

According to the surveys carried out by the NEOWISE mission of NASA's Wide-field Infrared Survey Explorer, Merlin measures 15.694 kilometers in diameter and its surface has an albedo of 0.049.

== Lightcurves ==
As of 2017, no rotational lightcurve of Merlin has been obtained from photometric observations. The body's rotation period and shape remain unknown.

== Naming ==
This minor planet was named after the sage and sorcerer Merlin, featured mentor of King Arthur in Arthurian legend and medieval Welsh poetry. His magic enabled Arthur to pull Excalibur from the rock and become the rightwise king born of all England. The name was suggested by F. Pilcher. The approved naming citation was published by the Minor Planet Center on 4 August 1982 (M.P.C. 7157).

== Notes ==
There is a book titled Merlin's Tour of the Universe, in which a fictitious character, called Merlin, answers all curious questions a layman would have about astronomy and the Solar System. In the book, Merlin's favorite asteroid is Merlin 2598.
