= 4175 Billbaum =

Main-belt asteroid

Discovery
- Discovered by: E. Bowell
- Discovery site: Anderson Mesa Stn.
- Discovery date: 15 April 1985

Designations
- Named after: William A. Baum (American astronomer)
- Alternative designations: 1985 GX · 1974 UE; 1978 QF_{2} · 1978 RL_{4}
- Minor planet category: main-belt · (middle) background · Eunomia

Orbital characteristics
- Epoch 23 March 2018 (JD 2458200.5)
- Uncertainty parameter 0
- Observation arc: 66.14 yr (24,159 d)
- Aphelion: 3.1831 AU
- Perihelion: 2.1842 AU
- Semi-major axis: 2.6836 AU
- Eccentricity: 0.1861
- Orbital period (sidereal): 4.40 yr (1,606 d)
- Mean anomaly: 239.61°
- Mean motion: 0° 13^{m} 27.12^{s} / day
- Inclination: 13.612°
- Longitude of ascending node: 163.41°
- Argument of perihelion: 316.77°

Physical characteristics
- Mean diameter: 8.873±0.278 km 9.60 km (calculated)
- Synodic rotation period: 2.730±0.005 h (Note: Ralph Megna (2011) web: rotation period 2.730±0.005 hours with a brightness amplitude of 0.15±0.03 mag. Quality code of 3-. Summary figures for (4175) Billbaum at the LCDB); 2.7425±0.0009 h 2.908±0.001 h
- Geometric albedo: 0.21 (assumed); 0.270±0.038
- Spectral type: L · S (assumed)
- Absolute magnitude (H): 11.96±0.72; 12.30; 12.4

4175 Billbaum, provisional designation 1985 GX, is a background asteroid from the central regions of the asteroid belt, approximately 9 kilometers (6 miles) in diameter. It was discovered on 15 April 1985, by American astronomer Edward Bowell at the Anderson Mesa Station of the Lowell Observatory near Flagstaff, Arizona. The uncommon L-type asteroid has a short rotation period of 2.73 hours and was named for American astronomer William A. Baum.

== Orbit and classification ==
Billbaum is a non-family asteroid of the main belt's background population when applying the hierarchical clustering method to its proper orbital elements. Based on osculating Keplerian orbital elements, the asteroid has also been classified as a member of the Eunomia family (502), a prominent family of stony S-type asteroid and the largest one in the intermediate main belt with more than 5,000 members.

It orbits the Sun in the central main-belt at a distance of 2.2–3.2 AU once every 4 years and 5 months (1,606 days; semi-major axis of 2.68 AU). Its orbit has an eccentricity of 0.19 and an inclination of 14° with respect to the ecliptic. The body's observation arc begins with a precovery taken at Palomar Observatory in August 1951, almost 34 years prior to its official discovery observation at Anderson Mesa.

== Physical characteristics ==
Billbaum has been characterized as an uncommon L-type asteroid by Pan-STARRS survey.

=== Rotation period ===
In January and February 2011, three rotational lightcurves of Billbaum were obtained from photometric observations by Ralph Megna, Josep Aymami and astronomers at the Oakley Southern Sky Observatory. Analysis of the best-rated lightcurve gave a short rotation period of 2.73 hours and a consolidated brightness amplitude between 0.08 and 0.15 magnitude (U=3-).

=== Diameter and albedo ===
According to the survey carried out by the NEOWISE mission of NASA's Wide-field Infrared Survey Explorer, Billbaum measures 8.87 kilometers in diameter and its surface has an albedo of 0.27, while the Collaborative Asteroid Lightcurve Link assumes a stony standard albedo of 0.21, derived from 15 Eunomia, the Eunomia family's parent body – and calculates a diameter of 9.60 kilometers based on an absolute magnitude of 12.4.

== Naming ==
This minor planet was named after American astronomer William A. Baum (1924–2012) who was on the directorship of the Lowell Observatory's Planetary Research Center. He also worked on the Hubble Space Telescope. The official naming citation was published by the Minor Planet Center on 28 April 1991 (M.P.C. 18139).
