= 3353 Jarvis =

Asteroid

Discovery
- Discovered by: E. Bowell
- Discovery site: Anderson Mesa Stn.
- Discovery date: 20 December 1981

Designations
- Named after: Gregory Jarvis (Challenger crew member)
- Alternative designations: 1981 YC
- Minor planet category: main-belt · (inner) · Hungaria

Orbital characteristics
- Epoch 4 September 2017 (JD 2458000.5)
- Uncertainty parameter 0
- Observation arc: 36.76 yr (13,427 days)
- Aphelion: 2.0208 AU
- Perihelion: 1.7050 AU
- Semi-major axis: 1.8629 AU
- Eccentricity: 0.0848
- Orbital period (sidereal): 2.54 yr (929 days)
- Mean anomaly: 158.84°
- Mean motion: 0° 23^{m} 15.36^{s} / day
- Inclination: 21.809°
- Longitude of ascending node: 245.60°
- Argument of perihelion: 34.803°

Physical characteristics
- Dimensions: 9.70 km (derived); 9.72±0.5 km 10.062±0.030 km 10.07±1.07 km 10.528±0.044 km 11.01±2.52 km 12.49±0.29 km
- Synodic rotation period: 40.8±0.1 h (dated); 202.0±0.5 h (Note: Warner (2007), lightcurve plot of (3353) Jarvis with a rotation period of 202±0.5 hours with a brightness amplitude of 0.5 magnitude. Quality code of 2+.)
- Geometric albedo: 0.030±0.005; 0.046±0.003; 0.0487±0.0028; 0.05±0.01; 0.06±0.01; 0.0622 (derived); 0.0744±0.007
- Spectral type: C · ES
- Absolute magnitude (H): 12.91±0.51 · 13.5 · 13.60 · 13.7 · 13.75

3353 Jarvis, or by its provisional designation, 1981 YC, is a carbonaceous Hungaria asteroid, slow rotator and suspected tumbler from the inner regions of the asteroid belt, approximately 10 kilometers in diameter.

It was discovered on 20 December 1981, by American astronomer Edward Bowell at Lowell's Anderson Mesa Station near Flagstaff, Arizona, and named after Gregory Jarvis, who died in the Space Shuttle Challenger disaster.

== Orbit and classification ==
Jarvis is a member of the Hungaria family, which form the innermost dense concentration of asteroids in the Solar System. It orbits the Sun at a distance of 1.7–2.0 AU once every 2 years and 6 months (929 days). Its orbit has an eccentricity of 0.08 and an inclination of 22° with respect to the ecliptic. A first precovery was taken at the Siding Spring Observatory in 1980, extending the body's observation arc by more than one year prior to its official discovery at Anderson Mesa.

== Physical characteristics ==
=== Rotation ===
In July 2007, a rotational lightcurve of Jarvis was obtained from photometric observations by astronomer Brian Warner at his Palmer Divide Station, Colorado, in collaboration with Robert Stephens, Alan Harris and Petr Pravec. The re-examined lightcurve analysis gave a rotation period of 202 hours with a brightness amplitude of 0.50 in magnitude, superseding the original period solution of 40.8 hours (U=2+/2).

Due to an improved long-term calibration of the obtained photometric data points, a much longer period of 202 hours has been derived for Jarvis, which is now among the Top 300 slowest rotators known to exist, as most minor planets have spin rates between 2.2 and 24 hours only.

The observations also suggest that Jarvis might be a tumbling asteroid in a non-principal axis rotation, which are typically slow rotators (T0).

=== Diameter and albedo ===
According to the surveys carried out by the Infrared Astronomical Satellite IRAS, the Japanese Akari satellite, and NASA's Wide-field Infrared Survey Explorer with its subsequent NEOWISE mission, Jarvis measures between 9.72 and 12.49 kilometers in diameter, and its surface has an albedo between 0.030 and 0.074. The Collaborative Asteroid Lightcurve Link derives an albedo of 0.0622 and a diameter of 9.70 kilometers based on an absolute magnitude of 13.7.

While most members of the Hungaria family are E-type asteroids with extremely bright surfaces and albedos in the order of 0.30, Jarvis has an unusually low albedo, typically seen for carbonaceous asteroids.

== Naming ==
This minor planet was named in memory of Gregory Jarvis (1944–1986), American astronaut and payload specialist, who died in the Space Shuttle Challenger disaster on 28 January 1986. The asteroids 3350 Scobee, 3351 Smith, 3352 McAuliffe, 3354 McNair, 3355 Onizuka, and 3356 Resnik commemorate the other crew members. The approved naming citation was published by the Minor Planet Center on 26 March 1986 (M.P.C. 10550).
