= 2830 Greenwich =

Asteroid

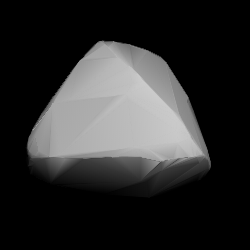
- Shape model of Greenwich from its lightcurve

Discovery
- Discovered by: E. Bowell
- Discovery site: Anderson Mesa Stn.
- Discovery date: 14 April 1980

Designations
- Named after: Royal Greenwich Observatory (historical observatory)
- Alternative designations: 1980 GA · 1969 KC; 1978 VZ_{14}
- Minor planet category: main-belt · Phocaea

Orbital characteristics
- Epoch 4 September 2017 (JD 2458000.5)
- Uncertainty parameter 0
- Observation arc: 47.96 yr (17,517 days)
- Aphelion: 2.8663 AU
- Perihelion: 1.8899 AU
- Semi-major axis: 2.3781 AU
- Eccentricity: 0.2053
- Orbital period (sidereal): 3.67 yr (1,340 days)
- Mean anomaly: 81.928°
- Mean motion: 0° 16^{m} 7.68^{s} / day
- Inclination: 25.355°
- Longitude of ascending node: 49.015°
- Argument of perihelion: 141.10°

Physical characteristics
- Mean diameter: 7.892±0.100; 9.197±0.064 km 9.25 km (taken); 9.252 km 9.50±0.43 km
- Synodic rotation period: 24 h
- Geometric albedo: 0.172±0.027; 0.1846±0.0451; 0.1865
- Spectral type: Tholen = S · S B–V = 0.867; U–B = 0.441
- Absolute magnitude (H): 12.55±0.51 · 12.61 · 12.64

2830 Greenwich (prov. designation: 1980 GA) is a bright Phocaea asteroid from the inner regions of the asteroid belt. It was discovered on 14 April 1980, by American astronomer Edward Bowell at Lowell's U.S. Anderson Mesa Station, Arizona, and named for the historical Royal Greenwich Observatory in England. The stony S-type asteroid has a long rotation period of 24 hours and measures approximately 9 kilometers (5.6 miles) in diameter

== Classification and orbit ==
Greenwich is a member of the Phocaea family (701), a group of asteroids with similar orbital characteristics. It orbits the Sun in the inner main-belt at a distance of 1.9–2.9 AU once every 3 years and 8 months (1,340 days). Its orbit has an eccentricity of 0.21 and an inclination of 25° with respect to the ecliptic. It was first identified as 1969 KC at Crimea-Nauchnij in 1969, extending the asteroid's observation arc by 11 years prior to its official discovery observation at Anderson Mesa.

== Naming ==
This minor planet is named for the Royal Greenwich Observatory, home of the Astronomer Royal and located in the London borough of Greenwich, England. The naming took place on the occasion of the centennial of its adoption as "the Greenwich prime meridian for longitude and time". Founded for naval purposes in 1675, the Royal Observatory quickly became a leading institution in astronomy. In 1884, the prime meridian finally became a worldwide standard. The official naming citation was published by the Minor Planet Center on 15 May 1984 (M.P.C. 8801).

== Physical characteristics ==
In the Tholen taxonomy, Greenwich is classified as a stony S-type asteroid.

=== Lightcurves ===
In May 2002, a photometric lightcurve analysis by French amateur astronomer Christophe Demeautis gave an ambiguous rotation period of 24 hours with a brightness variation of 0.5 in magnitude (U=2).

=== Diameter and albedo ===
According to the surveys carried out by NASA's Wide-field Infrared Survey Explorer with its subsequent NEOWISE mission, Greenwich measures between 7.9 and 9.5 kilometers in diameter, and its surface has an albedo between 0.17 and 0.19. The Collaborative Asteroid Lightcurve Link adopts Petr Pravec's revised WISE-results, that is, a diameter of 9.252 kilometer with an albedo of 0.1865 and an absolute magnitude of 12.61.

== See also ==
- 14141 Demeautis, 3-kilometer Flora asteroid named after Christophe Demeautis
