= 2815 Soma =

Binary Florian asteroid

Discovery
- Discovered by: E. Bowell
- Discovery site: Anderson Mesa Stn.
- Discovery date: 15 September 1982

Designations
- Pronunciation: /ˈsoʊmə/
- Named after: Soma cube (mechanical puzzle)
- Alternative designations: 1982 RL · 1955 MH; 1970 AC · 1974 DL; 1979 XB_{1}
- Minor planet category: main-belt · Flora

Orbital characteristics
- Epoch 4 September 2017 (JD 2458000.5)
- Uncertainty parameter 0
- Observation arc: 61.77 yr (22,562 days)
- Aphelion: 2.6107 AU
- Perihelion: 1.8552 AU
- Semi-major axis: 2.2329 AU
- Eccentricity: 0.1692
- Orbital period (sidereal): 3.34 yr (1,219 days)
- Mean anomaly: 168.50°
- Mean motion: 0° 17^{m} 43.44^{s} / day
- Inclination: 5.7042°
- Longitude of ascending node: 119.87°
- Argument of perihelion: 237.53°
- Known satellites: 1 (D_{s}/D_{p}: 0.25±0.02) (orbital period: 17.915 h)

Physical characteristics
- Dimensions: 6.641±0.105 km 7.067 km 7.07 km (taken); 7.158±0.088 km
- Synodic rotation period: 2.7327±0.0008 h (Note: Pravec (2009) web: lightcurve plot of (2815) Soma with rotation period 2.7327±0.0008 hours and a brightness amplitude of 0.08 magnitude. Quality Code of 3-. Summary figures at Collaborative Asteroid Lightcurve Link and data sheet from the Ondrejov Asteroid Photometry Project); 2.73325±0.00007 h
- Geometric albedo: 0.2273; 0.3207±0.0411; 0.365±0.083
- Spectral type: S
- Absolute magnitude (H): 12.49±0.06 (R) · 12.53±0.02 (R) · 12.6 · 12.7 · 12.92±0.16 · 12.98±0.078

2815 Soma, provisional designation 1982 RL, is a binary Florian asteroid from the inner regions of the asteroid belt, approximately 7 kilometers in diameter. It was discovered on 15 September 1982, by American astronomer Edward Bowell at Lowell's Anderson Mesa Station in Flagstaff, Arizona, in the United States . It is named for the mechanical puzzle Soma cube.

== Orbit and classification ==
Soma is a member of the Flora family, a large family of stony asteroids. It orbits the Sun in the inner main-belt at a distance of 1.9–2.6 AU once every 3 years and 4 months (1,219 days). Its orbit has an eccentricity of 0.17 and an inclination of 6° with respect to the ecliptic. It was first identified as 1955 MH at Goethe Link Observatory in 1955. The body's observation arc begins with 1970 AC at Crimea-Nauchnij, 12 years prior to its official discovery at Anderson Mesa.

== Diameter and albedo ==
According to the survey carried out by NASA's Wide-field Infrared Survey Explorer (WISE) with its subsequent NEOWISE mission, Soma measures 6.641 and 7.158 kilometers in diameter and its surface has an albedo of 0.365 and 0.3207, respectively. The Collaborative Asteroid Lightcurve Link adopts Peter Pravec's revised WISE-data, that is, an albedo of 0.2273 and a diameter of 7.067 kilometers with an absolute magnitude of 12.98.

== Moon and lightcurve ==
=== Primary ===
In November 2009, a rotational lightcurve of Soma was obtained from photometric observations by astronomers Petr Pravec, Donald Pray and Peter Kušnirák at Carbuncle Hill Observatory, Rhode Island, and Ondřejov Observatory, in the Czech Republic, respectively. Lightcurve analysis gave a rotation period of 2.7327 hours with a brightness variation of 0.08 magnitude, indicating that the body has a nearly spheroidal shape (U=3-). The body's spin rate is within the 2.2-to-20 hours range found for most asteroids, about half an hour longer than the so-called fast rotators.

=== Secondary ===
In March 2011, photometric observations revealed that Soma is a synchronous binary asteroid with a minor-planet moon orbiting it every 17.915 hours. The system has a secondary-to-primary mean-diameter ratio of 0.25, which means that satellite's diameter measures approximately 25% of that of Soma (the primary), and translate into a diameter of 1.75 kilometers. The observations also gave a refined rotation period for Soma of 2.73325 hours and an amplitude of 0.07 magnitude (U=n.a.). The system has an absolute magnitude of 12.53, and a phase slope parameter (G) of 0.27.

== Naming ==
This minor planet was named for the Soma cube, following a proposal by Belgian astronomer Jean Meeus (also see 2213 Meeus). The Soma cube a dissection puzzle with seven pieces, invented by the Danish mathematician Piet Hein and popularized by American writer Martin Gardner (also see 2587 Gardner). The approved naming citation was published by the Minor Planet Center on 10 September 1984 (M.P.C. 9080).
