= 2873 Binzel =

Florian asteroid and binary system

Discovery
- Discovered by: E. Bowell
- Discovery site: Anderson Mesa Stn.
- Discovery date: 28 March 1982

Designations
- Named after: Richard Binzel (American astronomer)
- Alternative designations: 1982 FR · 1935 KH; 1935 MH · 1938 GA; 1959 RA_{1}
- Minor planet category: main-belt · (inner); Flora

Orbital characteristics
- Epoch 4 September 2017 (JD 2458000.5)
- Uncertainty parameter 0
- Observation arc: 81.27 yr (29,683 days)
- Aphelion: 2.6074 AU
- Perihelion: 1.8954 AU
- Semi-major axis: 2.2514 AU
- Eccentricity: 0.1581
- Orbital period (sidereal): 3.38 yr (1,234 days)
- Mean anomaly: 112.97°
- Mean motion: 0° 17^{m} 30.48^{s} / day
- Inclination: 5.9003°
- Longitude of ascending node: 100.97°
- Argument of perihelion: 168.33°
- Known satellites: 1

Physical characteristics
- Dimensions: 6.426±0.471 km 6.48 km (calculated); 7.011±0.063 km
- Synodic rotation period: 11.560±0.0037 h
- Geometric albedo: 0.2307±0.0722; 0.24 (assumed); 0.272±0.060
- Spectral type: SMASS = Sq · S
- Absolute magnitude (H): 12.660±0.002 (R) · 12.99 · 13.10±0.41 · 13.11

2873 Binzel, provisional designation 1982 FR, is a stony Florian asteroid and binary system from the inner regions of the asteroid belt, approximately 6.5 kilometers in diameter. It was discovered on 28 March 1982, by American astronomer Edward Bowell at the Anderson Mesa Station in Flagstaff, Arizona. The asteroid was named after astronomer Richard Binzel. Its 1.6-kilometer minor-planet moon was discovered in 2019.

== Orbit and classification ==
Binzel is a member of the Flora family (402), a giant asteroid family and the largest family of stony asteroids in the main-belt. It orbits the Sun in the inner main belt at a distance of 1.9–2.6 AU once every 3 years and 5 months (1,234 days). Its orbit has an eccentricity of 0.16 and an inclination of 6° with respect to the ecliptic.

The body's observation arc begins with its identification as 1935 KH at the Johannesburg Observatory in 1935, almost 47 years prior to its official discovery observation at Anderson Mesa.

== Physical characteristics ==
In the SMASS classification, Binzel is a Sq-subtype, which transition from the common stony S-type asteroids to the less common Q-types.

=== Rotation period ===
In September 2010, a rotational lightcurve of Binzel was obtained from photometric observations in the R-band by astronomers at the Palomar Transient Factory in California. Lightcurve analysis gave a rotation period of 11.560 hours with a brightness variation of 0.14 magnitude (U=2).

=== Diameter and albedo ===
According to the survey carried out by the NEOWISE mission of NASA's Wide-field Infrared Survey Explorer, Binzel measures 6.426 and 7.011 kilometers in diameter and its surface has an albedo of 0.2307 and 0.272, respectively.

The Collaborative Asteroid Lightcurve Link assumes an albedo of 0.24 – derived from 8 Flora, the largest member and namesake of the Flora family – and calculates a diameter of 6.48 kilometers based on an absolute magnitude of 13.11.

== Naming ==
This minor planet was named after American astronomer Richard Binzel (born 1958) of the University of Texas at Austin. During the 1980s, Binzel has been a prolific photometrist, obtaining a large number of rotational lightcurves of main-belt asteroids. The official naming citation was prepared by Alan W. Harris and published by the Minor Planet Center on 8 November 1984 (M.P.C. 9215).
