= 2882 Tedesco =

Main-belt asteroid

Discovery
- Discovered by: E. Bowell
- Discovery site: Anderson Mesa Stn.
- Discovery date: 26 July 1981

Designations
- Named after: Ed Tedesco (American astronomer)
- Alternative designations: 1981 OG · 1936 QG; 1953 SF · 1964 PL; 1970 QF_{1}
- Minor planet category: main-belt · (outer); Themis

Orbital characteristics
- Epoch 23 March 2018 (JD 2458200.5)
- Uncertainty parameter 0
- Observation arc: 81.51 yr (29,770 d)
- Aphelion: 3.7624 AU
- Perihelion: 2.5429 AU
- Semi-major axis: 3.1527 AU
- Eccentricity: 0.1934
- Orbital period (sidereal): 5.60 yr (2,045 d)
- Mean anomaly: 178.19°
- Mean motion: 0° 10^{m} 33.96^{s} / day
- Inclination: 0.2898°
- Longitude of ascending node: 314.33°
- Argument of perihelion: 7.0021°

Physical characteristics
- Mean diameter: 20.89±5.43 km 21.48 km (calculated); 21.912±0.216 km 22.78±6.57 km 24.93±0.64 km
- Synodic rotation period: 19.805±0.008 h 19.815±0.0195 h
- Geometric albedo: 0.06±0.06; 0.065±0.014; 0.08±0.11; 0.084±0.012
- Spectral type: C (Pan-STARRS); C (SDSS-MOC)
- Absolute magnitude (H): 11.60; 11.683±0.002 (R); 11.7; 11.87; 11.96±0.32

2882 Tedesco, provisional designation 1981 OG, is a Themistian asteroid from the outer regions of the asteroid belt, approximately 22 kilometers (14 miles) in diameter. It was discovered on 26 July 1981, by astronomer Edward Bowell at the Anderson Mesa Station near Flagstaff, Arizona. The likely elongated C-type asteroid has a rotation period of 19.8 hours. It was named for American astronomer Ed Tedesco.

== Orbit and classification ==
Tedesco is a Themistian asteroid that belongs to the Themis family (602), one of the largest families of carbonaceous asteroids in the main belt. The family is named after its parent body 24 Themis.

Tedesco orbits the Sun in the outer asteroid belt at a distance of 2.5–3.8 AU once every 5 years and 7 months (2,045 days; semi-major axis of 3.15 AU). Its orbit has an eccentricity of 0.19 and an inclination of 0° with respect to the ecliptic. The body's observation arc begins with its first observation as 1936 QG at Heidelberg and Konkoly Observatory in August 1936, nearly 45 years prior to its official discovery observation at Anderson Mesa.

== Physical characteristics ==
Tedesco has been characterized as a carbonaceous C-type asteroid by both Pan-STARRS and SDSS, and agrees with the Themis family's overall spectral type.

=== Rotation period ===
In June 2014, a rotational lightcurve of Tedesco was obtained from photometric observations by Maurice Clark at Texas Tech's Preston Gott Observatory. Lightcurve analysis gave a well-defined rotation period of 19.805 hours with a high brightness amplitude of 0.76 magnitude, indicative of a non-spheroidal shape (U=3). A previous measurement from October 2010 by astronomers at the Palomar Transient Factory in California gave a similar period of 19.815 with an equally high brightness variation of 0.65 magnitude.(U=2).

=== Diameter and albedo ===
According to the survey carried out by the NEOWISE mission of NASA's Wide-field Infrared Survey Explorer, Tedesco measures between 20.89 and 24.93 kilometers in diameter and its surface has an albedo between 0.06 and 0.084, while the Collaborative Asteroid Lightcurve Link assumes an albedo of 0.08 and calculates a diameter of 21.48 kilometers based on an absolute magnitude of 11.7.

== Naming ==
This minor planet was named after Edward Francis Tedesco (Ed Tedesco), a planetary scientist at the Jet Propulsion Laboratory, who analyzed observations with the Infrared Astronomical Satellite in the 1980s. His studies included photometric observations of minor planets, their pole and shape determination, as well as the compositional structure of the asteroid belt. The official naming citation was published by the Minor Planet Center on 17 February 1984 (M.P.C. 8543).
