= 3537 Jürgen =

Main-belt asteroid

Discovery
- Discovered by: E. Bowell
- Discovery site: Anderson Mesa Stn.
- Discovery date: 15 November 1982

Designations
- Named after: Jürgen Rahe (planetary scientist)
- Alternative designations: 1982 VT · 1985 JE_{1}
- Minor planet category: main-belt · Eunomia; Maria

Orbital characteristics
- Epoch 4 September 2017 (JD 2458000.5)
- Uncertainty parameter 0
- Observation arc: 34.44 yr (12,580 days)
- Aphelion: 2.9939 AU
- Perihelion: 2.1811 AU
- Semi-major axis: 2.5875 AU
- Eccentricity: 0.1571
- Orbital period (sidereal): 4.16 yr (1,520 days)
- Mean anomaly: 199.04°
- Mean motion: 0° 14^{m} 12.48^{s} / day
- Inclination: 15.175°
- Longitude of ascending node: 44.253°
- Argument of perihelion: 277.59°

Physical characteristics
- Dimensions: 7.800±0.055 km 8.314±0.086; 9.17 km (calculated)
- Synodic rotation period: 14 h
- Geometric albedo: 0.1675±0.0266; 0.188±0.008; 0.21 (assumed)
- Spectral type: LS · S
- Absolute magnitude (H): 12.5 · 12.59±0.14 · 13.1

3537 Jürgen, provisional designation 1982 VT, is a stony Eunomia asteroid from the middle region of the asteroid belt, approximately 8 kilometers in diameter. It was discovered by American astronomer Edward Bowell at Lowell's Anderson Mesa Station, Arizona, on 15 November 1982. It was named after planetary scientist Jürgen Rahe.

== Orbit and classification ==
Jürgen is both a member of the Eunomia and Maria family of asteroids. It orbits the Sun in the central main-belt at a distance of 2.2–3.0 AU once every 4 years and 2 months (1,520 days). Its orbit has an eccentricity of 0.16 and an inclination of 15° with respect to the ecliptic. The first precovery was taken at Crimea-Nauchnij in 1982, extending the asteroid's observation arc by just 25 days prior to its discovery.

== Physical characteristics ==
Jürgen is a common S-type asteroid. It has also been characterized as a rare LS-type by Pan-STARRS' large-scale photometric survey.

=== Diameter and albedo ===
According to the survey carried out by the NEOWISE mission of NASA's Wide-field Infrared Survey Explorer, the asteroid measures 7.8 and 8.3 kilometers in diameter and its surface has an albedo of 0.168 and 0.188, while the Collaborative Asteroid Lightcurve Link (CALL) assumes an albedo of 0.21 and hence calculates a larger diameter of 9.1 kilometers.

=== Rotation period ===
A 2004-published photometric lightcurve analysis by Brazilian astronomer Alvaro Alvarez-Candal rendered a provisional rotation period of 14 hours with a brightness amplitude of 0.3 in magnitude (U=1).

== Naming ==
This minor planet was named after Jürgen Rahe (1939–1997), German planetary scientist, astrophysicist, and Director for Solar System Exploration at NASA's Office of Space Science. He is best known for his cometary atlases and observations using the International Ultraviolet Explorer.

Jürgen Rahe was also a principal investigator of the International Halley Watch (IHW), director of both, the astronomy department at FAU and the Dr. Remeis Observatory, and affiliated with IAU's Physical Studies of Comets, Minor Planets and Meteorites commission for many years. His diplomatic skills in international projects were beneficial to both IHW and IAU. The approved naming citation was published by the Minor Planet Center on 2 April 1988 (M.P.C. 12973).
