= 2531 Cambridge =

Main-belt asteroid

Discovery
- Discovered by: E. Bowell
- Discovery site: Anderson Mesa Stn.
- Discovery date: 11 June 1980

Designations
- Named after: Cambridge (UK) and Cambridge, MA (USA)
- Alternative designations: 1980 LD · 1931 AP; 1942 EQ · 1952 BG; 1963 FK · 1963 HD; 1971 VY · 1974 KH; A916 FE
- Minor planet category: main-belt · (outer); Eos

Orbital characteristics
- Epoch 4 September 2017 (JD 2458000.5)
- Uncertainty parameter 0
- Observation arc: 86.40 yr (31,557 days)
- Aphelion: 3.1787 AU
- Perihelion: 2.8383 AU
- Semi-major axis: 3.0085 AU
- Eccentricity: 0.0566
- Orbital period (sidereal): 5.22 yr (1,906 days)
- Mean anomaly: 199.25°
- Mean motion: 0° 11^{m} 20.04^{s} / day
- Inclination: 11.032°
- Longitude of ascending node: 104.36°
- Argument of perihelion: 32.390°

Physical characteristics
- Mean diameter: 19.15±1.9 km 19.15 km (derived); 22.349±0.196 km 22.911±0.130 km 23.44±0.95 km
- Synodic rotation period: 8.80±0.01 h 12.200±0.0032 h
- Geometric albedo: 0.147±0.014; 0.1491±0.0193; 0.166±0.026; 0.2102 (derived); 0.2104±0.050
- Spectral type: S (assumed)
- Absolute magnitude (H): 10.712±0.001 (R)

2531 Cambridge, provisional designation 1980 LD, is a stony Eoan asteroid from the outer regions of the asteroid belt, approximately 20 kilometers in diameter. It was discovered on 11 June 1980, by American astronomer Edward Bowell at Lowell's Anderson Mesa Station in Arizona, United States. The asteroid was named for the "centers of learning in England and in Massachusetts".

== Classification and orbit ==
Cambridge is a member of the Eos family (606), the largest asteroid family in the outer main belt consisting of nearly 10,000 known asteroids. It orbits the Sun at a distance of 2.8–3.2 AU once every 5 years and 3 months (1,906 days). Its orbit has an eccentricity of 0.06 and an inclination of 11° with respect to the ecliptic.

It was first identified as A916 FE Simeiz Observatory in 1916. The body's observation arc begins with a precovery taken at Lowell Observatory in 1931, or 49 years prior to its official discovery observation at Anderson Mesa.

== Physical characteristics ==
Cambridge is an assumed stony S-type asteroid, in line with the overall spectral type for members of the Eos family.

=== Rotation period ===
In February 2004, a rotational lightcurve of Cambridge was obtained from photometric observations by French amateur astronomer René Roy. Lightcurve analysis gave a rotation period of 8.80 hours with a brightness variation of 0.21 magnitude (U=2-). In October 2010, observations at the Palomar Transient Factory, California, gave a longer period of 12.200 hours with an amplitude of 0.20 magnitude (U=2).

=== Diameter and albedo ===
According to the surveys carried out by the Infrared Astronomical Satellite IRAS, the Japanese Akari satellite, and NASA's Wide-field Infrared Survey Explorer with its subsequent NEOWISE mission, Cambridge measures between 19.15 and 23.44 kilometers in diameter and its surface has an albedo between 0.147 and 0.2104.

The Collaborative Asteroid Lightcurve Link derives an albedo of 0.2102 and a diameter of 19.15 kilometers with an absolute magnitude of 10.9, identical with the results obtained by IRAS.

== Naming ==
This minor planet was named after the University of Cambridge in England and the universities in the city of Cambridge, Massachusetts (United States), where the Minor Planet Center (MPC) is located at the Smithsonian Astrophysical Observatory. The approved naming citation was published by the MPC on 8 April 1982 (M.P.C. 6834).
