= 2542 Calpurnia =

Main-belt asteroid

Discovery
- Discovered by: E. Bowell
- Discovery site: Anderson Mesa Stn.
- Discovery date: 11 February 1980

Designations
- Pronunciation: /kælˈpɜːrniə/
- Named after: Calpurnia (Julius Caesar's wife)
- Alternative designations: 1980 CF · 1972 XN_{2} 1976 OE
- Minor planet category: main-belt · (outer)

Orbital characteristics
- Epoch 4 September 2017 (JD 2458000.5)
- Uncertainty parameter 0
- Observation arc: 62.57 yr (22,854 days)
- Aphelion: 3.3624 AU
- Perihelion: 2.8997 AU
- Semi-major axis: 3.1311 AU
- Eccentricity: 0.0739
- Orbital period (sidereal): 5.54 yr (2,024 days)
- Mean anomaly: 248.88°
- Mean motion: 0° 10^{m} 40.44^{s} / day
- Inclination: 4.6207°
- Longitude of ascending node: 145.71°
- Argument of perihelion: 47.930°

Physical characteristics
- Dimensions: 18±1 km 20.854±0.281 km 27.6±2.3 km
- Geometric albedo: 0.0639±0.012; 0.102±0.007; 0.15±0.02
- Spectral type: C
- Absolute magnitude (H): 11.6

2542 Calpurnia, provisionally designated 1980 CF, is a carbonaceous high-albedo asteroid from the outer regions of the asteroid belt, approximately 20 kilometers in diameter. It was discovered on 11 February 1980, by American astronomer Edward Bowell at Anderson Mesa Station, Flagstaff, United States. The asteroid was named after Julius Caesar's wife, Calpurnia.

== Orbit and classification ==
Calpurnia orbits the Sun in the outer main-belt at a distance of 2.9–3.4 AU once every 5 years and 6 months (2,024 days). Its orbit has an eccentricity of 0.07 and an inclination of 5° with respect to the ecliptic. In 1954, a first precovery was taken at the Palomar Observatory in California, extending the body's observation arc by 26 prior to its official discovery observation at Anderson Mesa.

== Physical characterization ==
=== Diameter and albedo ===
According to the surveys carried out by the Infrared Astronomical Satellite IRAS and NASA's Wide-field Infrared Survey Explorer with its subsequent NEOWISE mission, Calpurnia measures 27.6 and 20.854 kilometers in diameter, and its surface has an albedo of 0.0639 and 0.102, respectively. It has an absolute magnitude of 11.6.

Near-infrared spectroscopic observations, however, gave a higher albedo of 0.15 with a subsequently shorter diameter of 18 kilometers. Calpurnia has a featureless surface with up to 60% amorphous magnesium pyroxenes that might explain the high albedo for an carbonaceous outer-belt asteroid.

=== Lightcurve ===
As of 2017, no rotational lightcurve has been obtained. The body's spectral type, as well as its rotation period and shape remain unknown.

== Naming ==
This minor planet was named after Calpurnia, the last wife of Julius Caesar. The approved naming citation was published by the Minor Planet Center on 8 April 1982 (M.P.C. 6834).
