= 4337 Arecibo =

Binary main-belt asteroid

Discovery
- Discovered by: Edward L. G. Bowell
- Discovery site: Anderson Mesa Stn.
- Discovery date: 14 April 1985

Designations
- Named after: Arecibo Observatory
- Alternative designations: 1933 HE · 1979 FR_{3} 1979 HG_{2} · 1985 GB
- Minor planet category: main belt (outer); Themis

Orbital characteristics
- Epoch 9 August 2022 (JD 2459800.5)
- Uncertainty parameter 0
- Observation arc: 88.42 yr (32,295 d)
- Earliest precovery date: 24 April 1933
- Aphelion: 3.5626 AU
- Perihelion: 2.9702 AU
- Semi-major axis: 3.2664 AU
- Eccentricity: 0.0907
- Orbital period (sidereal): 5.90 yr (2,156 d)
- Mean anomaly: 104.049°
- Mean motion: 0° 10^{m} 1.041^{s} / day
- Inclination: 2.2131°
- Longitude of ascending node: 41.175°
- Argument of perihelion: 183.07°

Physical characteristics
- Mean diameter: 24.4±0.6 km (primary, occultation); 18.7 km (primary, thermal)
- Mass: (4.3±0.5)×10^{15} kg (system) (Note: The system mass of (4.3±0.5)×10^{15} kg is the total mass of the 4337 Arecibo binary system, including both the primary and satellite.); 4.1×10^{15} kg (primary) (Note: The primary component is the largest component of the 4337 Arecibo binary system.)
- Mean density: 1.2 g/cm^{3} (primary)
- Synodic rotation period: 32.974 h (synchronous)
- Axial tilt: 27°±3°
- Pole ecliptic longitude: 267°±6°
- Pole ecliptic latitude: 63°±3°
- Geometric albedo: 0.077±0.004; 0.06±0.02
- Absolute magnitude (H): 11.9±0.1 (2019); 12.45 (2016); 12.44 (JPL)

4337 Arecibo is a binary asteroid in the outer regions of the asteroid belt, approximately 24 kilometers (15 miles) in diameter. It was discovered on 14 April 1985, by American astronomer Edward Bowell at the Anderson Mesa Station near Flagstaff, Arizona, in the United States. It was named after the Arecibo Observatory in Puerto Rico. It has a relatively large minor-planet moon that was discovered in stellar occultation observations by David Gault and Peter Nosworthy in May 2021, distinguishing it as the first asteroid moon discovered and confirmed solely using the occultation method.

== History ==
=== Discovery ===
This asteroid was discovered by American astronomer Edward Bowell while measuring a pair of images taken with the Lowell Observatory's 0.33-meter astrograph on 14 April 1985, located at the Anderson Mesa Station near Flagstaff, Arizona, in the United States. The discovery observations were published by the Minor Planet Center on 4 May 1985. In September 1985, astronomers Kiichirō Furukawa and Lutz D. Schmadel both identified the asteroid in prediscovery observations from March and April 1979, while Furukawa independently found earlier prediscovery observations from April 1933. With these prediscovery observations linked, the asteroid's orbit was significantly improved and eventually received its permanent minor planet number of 4337 from the Minor Planet Center on 11 January 1990.

=== Naming ===
The asteroid was named after the Arecibo Observatory in Puerto Rico, home to the world's largest filled-aperature radio telescope in the 20th century. The name was proposed by radar astronomer Steven J. Ostro, in recognition of the observatory's contributions to the characterization of Solar System bodies including asteroids. The official naming citation was published by the Minor Planet Center on 8 June 1990.

=== Occultations and satellite discovery ===
On 19 May 2021, two amateur astronomers, David Gault and Peter Nosworthy, observed Arecibo passing in front of a magnitude 13.6 star and blocking out its light from New South Wales, Australia. Each observed the stellar occultation using high-speed video cameras attached to their 30-cm aperture telescopes at their home observatories, separated from each other by 0.7 km (0.43 mi) across (perpendicular) and 18 km (11 mi) along (parallel) the path of Arecibo's shadow across Earth. They detected a two-second-long occultation starting at 17:58 UTC, but then unexpectedly detected a secondary, shorter-duration occultation three seconds later. The observed drop in the star's brightness for both events was much greater than would be expected for a double star with one component occulted, leading Gault and Nosworthy to the conclusion that the secondary occultation was more likely caused by a natural satellite orbiting Arecibo.

Several days after the discovery of Arecibo's satellite, other occultation astronomers were alerted to follow up in another occultation event by Arecibo over North America on 9 June 2021. Richard Nolthenius and Kirk Bender, separated from each other by 8.2 km (5.1 mi) across and 8 km (5.0 mi) along Arecibo's shadow path, successfully observed the 9 June 2021 occultation from central California. As Arecibo passed in front of a magnitude 12.0 star, they detected the primary two-second-long occultation starting at 10:58 UTC and then the satellite make a secondary occultation three seconds later, confirming the existence of Arecibo's satellite. The satellite discovery and confirmation results from the May and June 2021 occultations were formally published by Central Bureau for Astronomical Telegrams on 20 June 2021. Discoverers Gault and Nosworthy recognize Arecibo's satellite as the first asteroid moon discovered by amateur astronomers and confirmed using the occultation method. (Note: Asteroid 2258 Viipuri may also have a putative satellite that was solely detected in two single-chord occultations from 3 August 2013 and 19 September 2018, but the timespan between these detections is too sparse to determine the satellite's orbital motion.)

On 30 June 2021, astronomers across the United States prepared for another occultation by Arecibo to further follow up on its satellite, but majority of them experienced technical difficulties and unfavorable weather conditions, resulting in only 5 out of 15 different sites making successful observations. Only 3 of the 5 successful sites reported positive detections (Nolthenius, Bender, and Christopher Kitting of CSU East Bay reported positives) with a single occultation; the other two had misses and did not detect the satellite. It is possible the satellite and main body were a blended image, given the close orbit later determined.

== Orbit and classification ==
Arecibo orbits the Sun in the outer main-belt at a distance of 3.0–3.6 AU once every 5 years and 11 months (2,156 days; semi-major axis of 3.27 AU). Its orbit has an eccentricity of 0.09 and an inclination of 2° with respect to the ecliptic. Arecibo's orbit is similar to that of the large asteroid 24 Themis, which indicates that Arecibo belongs to the Themis family (602), a very large family of carbonaceous asteroids that are believed to have originated as fragments from an impact event on Themis.

Because of its low orbital inclination, Arecibo is visible along the ecliptic at apparent magnitudes 16–18. Arecibo is too faint to be seen with the naked eye, even when at its peak brightness of magnitude 16 at opposition—a telescope of at least 60 cm (24 in) in aperture size is required to see it.

== Physical characteristics ==
The spectral class of Arecibo is unknown, but it can be assumed to be a carbonaceous C-type, similar to most members of the Themis family. Like most members of the Themis family, Arecibo likely has a highly porous internal structure with a low density below 1.3 g/cm^{3}, as indicated by its mass determined from the satellite's orbital motion.

=== Diameter and albedo ===
Based on occultation observations from 9 June 2021, the primary body of the Arecibo system measures 24.4 ± 0.6 km (15.16 ± 0.37 mi) in diameter, assuming that it has a spherical shape. On the other hand, infrared thermal emission measurements by the Japan Aerospace Exploration Agency's Akari and NASA's Wide-field Infrared Survey Explorer (WISE) determined smaller diameters of 17.6 and 19.7 km (10.9 and 12.2 mi), respectively, with corresponding geometric albedos of 0.10 and 0.08. The discrepancy between the occultation and infrared measurements may be caused by a highly flattened shape for both components of the Arecibo system; in this case the occultation-derived primary diameter would represent the maximum extent of its shape. WISE's estimates for Arecibo's absolute magnitude range from 11.9 to 12.6, with an average of 12.4 assumed by the Collaborative Asteroid Lightcurve Link. The Minor Planet Center and Jet Propulsion Laboratory's Small-Body Database both determine an absolute magnitude of 12.5 based on visible photometry only.

=== Rotation ===
In July 2021, a preliminary rotational lightcurve of Arecibo was obtained from photometric observations by Swiss astronomer Raoul Behrend at Geneva Observatory in Switzerland. Lightcurve analysis gave an approximate rotation period of 32.85±0.38 hours with a brightness amplitude of 0.17 magnitude (U=2). High-precision photometry and astrometry from the Gaia spacecraft confirmed this period and showed that it is equal to the satellite's orbital period, suggesting that the Arecibo primary is in synchronous rotation with the satellite's orbital period.

Based on Gaia photometry, Arecibo's north pole points in the direction of ecliptic longitude 271° and ecliptic latitude 68°. Gaia astrometry for the satellite's orbit yields a pole orientation of ecliptic longitude 261°±3° and ecliptic latitude 60°±3°, in agreement with the photometry-derived pole orientation. This suggests the axial tilt of Arecibo primary is aligned with the satellite's orbital inclination at 30° with respect to the ecliptic. (Note: Tanga et al. (2022) give the satellite's orbit pole orientation in terms of ecliptic coordinates, where λ is ecliptic longitude and β is ecliptic latitude. β is the angular offset from the ecliptic plane and inclination i with respect to the ecliptic is the angular offset from the ecliptic north pole at β = +90°; i with respect to the ecliptic would be the complement of β. Therefore, given β = 60°, i = 90° – 60° = 30° from the ecliptic.)

== Satellite ==
Satellite
Discovery
- Discovered by: David Gault; Peter Nosworthy
- Discovery date: 19 May 2021

Orbital characteristics
- Epoch 8 August 2014 04:51:48 UTC (JD 2456877.70264)
- Semi-major axis: 46.8+1.8 −2.0 km
- Eccentricity: 0.06±0.04
- Orbital period (sidereal): 32.9741±0.0004 h
- Inclination: 27°±3° wrt ecliptic
- Longitude of ascending node: 357°±6°
- Argument of perihelion: 233°±44°
- Satellite of: 4337 Arecibo

Physical characteristics
- Mean diameter: 13±1.5 km (occultation); 6.2 km (thermal)
- Mass: 0.2×10^{15} kg
- Mean density: 1.6 g/cm^{3} (primary)

Arecibo hosts a relatively large minor-planet moon with a size about half its diameter, forming a binary system. This unnamed satellite orbits closely at an orbital radius of 50 km (31 mi) from the primary body of the Arecibo system, completing a full revolution in about 33 hours or 1.4 days. It was discovered by Australian amateur astronomers David Gault and Peter Nosworthy while observing Arecibo occulting a star on 19 May 2021, and was confirmed in another occultation on 9 June 2021.

=== Orbit ===
The observed angular separation between the satellite and primary body in the 19 May and 9 June 2021 occultations were 25.5±1.0 and 32.8±0.7 milliarcseconds, respectively. In July 2021, Nolthenius presented a preliminary analysis suggesting that the satellite's orbital radius should lie in the range of 100–293 km (62–182 mi), based on an assumed system density of 1.9 g/cm^{3} and an outer orbital stability limit set by Jupiter's gravitational influence. Because no photometric measurements of Arecibo's rotation period were available at that time, constraints on the satellite's orbital period were solely limited to the three occultations observed in 2021, which suggested periods of 20 days and its shorter-period aliases of 10 days, 5 days, and 2.5 days.

On 13 June 2022, a team of European astronomers led by Paolo Tanga, on behalf of the European Space Agency, published a proof-of-concept analysis of the Arecibo system using high-precision astrometry and photometry from the Gaia mission, as part of its third data release. They found that Arecibo exhibits periodic oscillations in brightness and position that are both compatible with a period of 32.972823 hours (1.3738676 d), consistent with earlier ground-based photometry from July 2021 and establishing the satellite's orbital period. They determined a smaller orbital radius of 49.9 ± 1.0 km (31.01 ± 0.62 mi) and an inclination of 30°±3° with respect to the ecliptic, precisely coinciding with the satellite's positions observed in the May and June 2021 occultations. Given the satellite's close proximity to the primary body and coincidence of brightness and position oscillation periods, the satellite is likely in synchronous orbit with the primary's rotation period.

=== Physical characteristics ===
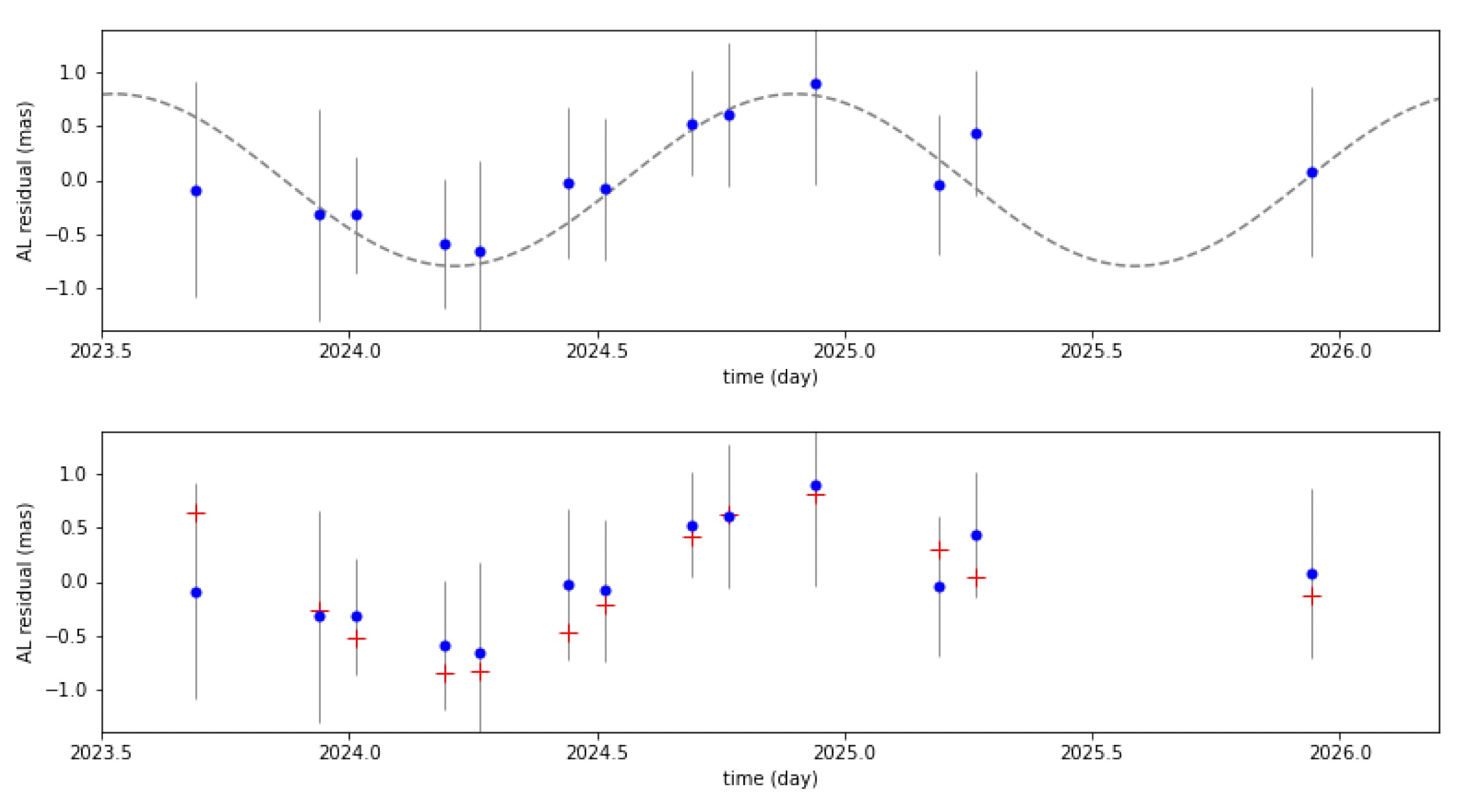
Periodic oscillation in Arecibo's position measured by the Gaia spacecraft, signifying the presence of a large orbiting satellite

The initial detection of the satellite in the 19 May 2021 occultation provided poor constraints on its size due to close spacing between the observers' sites. The 9 June 2021 occultation proved to be more reliable with wider spacing between observer sites, providing a best-fit satellite diameter of 13 ± 1.5 km (8.08 ± 0.93 mi) for an assumed spherical shape for the satellite. Given this diameter estimate, this makes the satellite about half the size of the primary body in the Arecibo system.

The satellite is massive enough to induce measurable positional wobbling of the Arecibo primary, although with an unexpectedly low amplitude of up to 2.7 milliarcseconds from Gaia's view, or 8.5% of the maximum observed angular separation between the satellite and primary. This small positional wobbling of the Arecibo primary implies a very low satellite-to-primary mass ratio relative to the satellite-to-primary diameter ratio, which could either be explained by a highly flattened shape or a very low density for the satellite. Tanga and collaborators favor the high flattening scenario as it yields more realistic density values and can explain the infrared underestimation of the primary's diameter. In this case, the occultation-derived satellite diameter would represent its maximum shape extent and its minimum possible density would be 1 g/cm^{3}, which is expected for a highly porous asteroid of the Themis family.

== See also ==
- 90 Antiope – binary asteroid with equal-sized components in the Themis family
- 379 Huenna – another binary asteroid in the Themis family
