= 2985 Shakespeare =

Main-belt asteroid

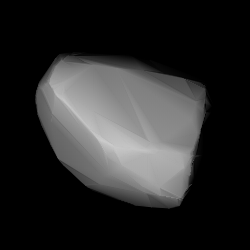
- Shakespeare modeled from its lightcurve

Discovery
- Discovered by: E. Bowell
- Discovery site: Anderson Mesa Stn.
- Discovery date: 12 October 1983

Designations
- Named after: William Shakespeare (poet & playwright)
- Alternative designations: 1983 TV_{1} · 1962 JJ; 1976 GV · 1978 RY_{4} 1978 TM_{3} · 1980 BT_{3}
- Minor planet category: main-belt · Koronis

Orbital characteristics
- Epoch 4 September 2017 (JD 2458000.5)
- Uncertainty parameter 0
- Observation arc: 54.68 yr (19,971 days)
- Aphelion: 2.9783 AU
- Perihelion: 2.7184 AU
- Semi-major axis: 2.8483 AU
- Eccentricity: 0.0456
- Orbital period (sidereal): 4.81 yr (1,756 days)
- Mean anomaly: 87.549°
- Mean motion: 0° 12^{m} 18^{s} / day
- Inclination: 2.6496°
- Longitude of ascending node: 34.228°
- Argument of perihelion: 277.66°

Physical characteristics
- Mean diameter: 10.31 km (calculated); 10.472±0.101 km
- Synodic rotation period: 6.0567±0.0020 h 6.06±0.02 h 6.080±0.040 h
- Geometric albedo: 0.24 (assumed); 0.255±0.034
- Spectral type: S
- Absolute magnitude (H): 11.918±0.003 (R) · 11.930±0.240 (R) · 12.0 · 12.1

2985 Shakespeare (prov. designation: 1983 TV_{1}) is a stony Koronian asteroid from the outer region of the asteroid belt. It was discovered on 12 October 1983, by American astronomer Edward Bowell at Lowell's Anderson Mesa Station near Flagstaff, Arizona, and later named after William Shakespeare. The presumed S-type asteroid has a rotation period of 6.1 hours and measures approximately 10 kilometers (6.2 miles) in diameter.

== Classification and orbit ==
The S-type asteroid is a member of the Koronis family, a group consisting of about 200 known bodies. It orbits the Sun in the outer main-belt at a distance of 2.7–3.0 AU once every 4 years and 10 months (1,756 days). Its orbit has an eccentricity of 0.05 and an inclination of 3° with respect to the ecliptic. It was first identified as 1962 JJ at Goethe Link Observatory in 1962. The body's observation arc begins with its identification 1976 GV at Crimea–Nauchnij, 7 years prior to its official discovery observation at Anderson Mesa.

== Naming ==
This minor planet was named after William Shakespeare (1564–1616), the English renaissance dramatist and poet. The approved naming citation was published by the Minor Planet Center on 29 September 1985 (M.P.C. 10044).

== Physical characteristics ==
=== Rotation period and poles ===
Three different rotational lightcurves, obtained from photometric observations taken at the Palomar Transient Factory and a group of seven observatories, respectively, found a concurring rotation period of 6.06–6.08 hours with a brightness variation between 0.37 and 0.53 magnitude (U=2/3/2).

=== Diameter and albedo ===
According to the space-based NEOWISE mission of NASA's Wide-field Infrared Survey Explorer, the body has an albedo of 0.26 and measures 10.5 kilometers in diameter, while the Collaborative Asteroid Lightcurve Link assumes a standard albedo for members of the Koronis family of 0.24 and calculates a diameter of 10.3 kilometers with an absolute magnitude of 12.1.
