= 2433 Sootiyo =

Main-belt asteroid

Discovery
- Discovered by: E. Bowell
- Discovery site: Anderson Mesa Stn.
- Discovery date: 5 April 1981

Designations
- Named after: "star boy" (Hopi language)
- Alternative designations: 1981 GJ · 1939 KA; 1960 KA · 1969 QF; 1974 VZ_{1} · 1978 SG_{6} 1978 UL
- Minor planet category: main-belt · (middle)

Orbital characteristics
- Epoch 4 September 2017 (JD 2458000.5)
- Uncertainty parameter 0
- Observation arc: 63.40 yr (23,157 days)
- Aphelion: 3.1849 AU
- Perihelion: 2.0276 AU
- Semi-major axis: 2.6062 AU
- Eccentricity: 0.2220
- Orbital period (sidereal): 4.21 yr (1,537 days)
- Mean anomaly: 195.45°
- Mean motion: 0° 14^{m} 3.48^{s} / day
- Inclination: 10.366°
- Longitude of ascending node: 188.27°
- Argument of perihelion: 71.294°

Physical characteristics
- Dimensions: 12.076±0.136 km 12.946±0.103 km 14.85±0.37 km 14.89 km (calculated)
- Synodic rotation period: 7 h (Note: ECLA (2011) web: rotation period hours with a brightness amplitude of mag. Summary figures for (2433) Sootiyo at Collaborative Asteroid Lightcurve Link (CALL) and Proyecto ECLA (Silvia Alonso Perez) (2011)); 7.2298±0.0002 h
- Geometric albedo: 0.156±0.009; 0.20 (assumed); 0.2690±0.0630; 0.304±0.062
- Spectral type: LS · S
- Absolute magnitude (H): 11.5 · 11.80 · 11.86±0.62

2433 Sootiyo, provisional designation 1981 GJ, is a stony asteroid from the middle region of the asteroid belt, approximately 13 kilometers in diameter. It was discovered on 5 April 1981, by American astronomer Edward Bowell at Lowell's Anderson Mesa Station near Flagstaff, Arizona. The asteroid was named "Sootiya" meaning "star boy" in the Hopi language.

== Orbit and classification ==
Sootiyo orbits the Sun in the central main-belt at a distance of 2.0–3.2 AU once every 4 years and 3 months (1,537 days). Its orbit has an eccentricity of 0.22 and an inclination of 10° with respect to the ecliptic. The first used precovery was taken at Palomar Observatory in 1953, extending the asteroid's observation arc by 28 years prior to its discovery observation.

== Physical characteristics ==
PanSTARRS photometric survey characterized Sootiyo as a LS-type, an intermediary between the stony S-type and rare L-type asteroids.

=== Rotation period ===
French amateur astronomer René Roy obtained a rotational lightcurve from photometric observations in October 2007. It gave a rotation period of 7.2298 hours with a brightness variation of 0.54 magnitude (U=2+), superseding observations by Brazilian Cláudia Angeli and by the Spanish ECLA project, which both gave a period of 7 hours with an amplitude of 0.57 and 0.4 magnitude, respectively (U=1/2).

=== Diameter and albedo ===
According to the survey carried out by the Japanese Akari satellite, the asteroid measures 14.9 kilometers in diameter and its surface has an albedo of 0.156, while two different data sets from NASA's Wide-field Infrared Survey Explorer with its subsequent NEOWISE mission give a diameter of 12.1 and 12.9 kilometers with an albedo of 0.269 and 0.304, respectively.

The Collaborative Asteroid Lightcurve Link agrees with the results obtained by Akari, assuming a standard albedo for stony asteroids of 0.20 and calculating a diameter of 14.9 kilometers with an absolute magnitude of 11.5.

== Naming ==
This minor planet is named "Sootiya" which means "star boy" in the language of the Hopi Tribe of northern Arizona. Correspondingly, the Vestian asteroid 2432 Soomana stands for "star girl". Naming citation was proposed by Michael Lomatewama and Ekkehart Malotki and published on 8 February 1982 (M.P.C. 6650).
