= 3350 Scobee =

Main-belt asteroid

Discovery
- Discovered by: E. Bowell
- Discovery site: Anderson Mesa Stn.
- Discovery date: 8 August 1980

Designations
- Named after: Dick Scobee (Challenger crew member)
- Alternative designations: 1980 PJ · 1973 SG_{2} 1976 JU_{10}
- Minor planet category: main-belt · Flora

Orbital characteristics
- Epoch 4 September 2017 (JD 2458000.5)
- Uncertainty parameter 0
- Observation arc: 64.53 yr (23,568 days)
- Aphelion: 2.7846 AU
- Perihelion: 1.8357 AU
- Semi-major axis: 2.3102 AU
- Eccentricity: 0.2054
- Orbital period (sidereal): 3.51 yr (1,283 days)
- Mean anomaly: 200.70°
- Mean motion: 0° 16^{m} 50.52^{s} / day
- Inclination: 3.4096°
- Longitude of ascending node: 353.72°
- Argument of perihelion: 330.81°

Physical characteristics
- Dimensions: 3.11±0.59 km 3.26 km (calculated); 7.401±0.210 km
- Geometric albedo: 0.059±0.011; 0.22±0.08; 0.24 (assumed)
- Spectral type: S
- Absolute magnitude (H): 14.3 · 14.6 · 14.81 · 15.10±0.25

3350 Scobee, provisional designation 1980 PJ, is a stony Florian asteroid from the inner regions of the asteroid belt, approximately 3 kilometers in diameter. It was discovered on 8 August 1980 by American astronomer Edward Bowell at Lowell's Anderson Mesa Station near Flagstaff, Arizona. It was named for Dick Scobee, commander of the ill-fated Challenger crew.

== Orbit and classification ==
Scobee is a member of the Flora family, one of the largest families of stony asteroids. It orbits the Sun in the inner main-belt at a distance of 1.8–2.8 AU once every 3 years and 6 months (1,283 days). Its orbit has an eccentricity of 0.21 and an inclination of 3° with respect to the ecliptic. A first precovery was taken at Palomar Observatory in 1952, extending the body's observation arc by 28 years prior to its official discovery observation at Anderson Mesa.

== Physical parameters ==
According to preliminary results of the space-based survey carried out by NASA's Wide-field Infrared Survey Explorer with its subsequent NEOWISE mission, Scobee measured 7.401 kilometers in diameter and its surface had a dark, carbonaceous albedo of 0.059. The Collaborative Asteroid Lightcurve Link, however, assumed an albedo of 0.24 – derived from 8 Flora, the largest member and namesake of the family – and calculated a diameter of 3.26 kilometers based on an absolute magnitude of 14.6. More recent NEOWISE-observations, taken during the second year since the spacecraft was reactivated in late 2013, are in agreement, giving a diameter of 3.11 kilometers and an albedo of 0.22.

Photometric observations gave a respective brightness variation of 0.16 and 0.17 magnitude, which indicates that the body has a rather spheroidal shape. As of 2017, however, no rotational lightcurve of Scobee has been obtained and its rotation period remains unknown.

== Naming ==
This minor planet was named in memory of American astronaut and commander of the Challenger Space Shuttle Dick Scobee (1939–1986), who died in the Space Shuttle Challenger disaster on 28 January 1986. The sequentially numbered minor planets 3351 Smith, 3352 McAuliffe, 3353 Jarvis, 3354 McNair, 3355 Onizuka, and 3356 Resnik were named for the other crew members of the ill-fated STS-51-L mission. The approved naming citation was published by the Minor Planet Center on 26 March 1986 (M.P.C. 10549).
