= Edward L. G. Bowell =

American astronomer (1943–2023)

Edward L. G. Bowell (1943 – August 21, 2023), was an American astronomer. Bowell was educated at Emanuel School London, University College, London, and the University of Paris.

He was principal investigator of the Lowell Observatory Near-Earth-Object Search (LONEOS). He has discovered a large number of asteroids, both as part of LONEOS and in his own right before LONEOS began. Among the latter are the Jovian asteroids 2357 Phereclos, 2759 Idomeneus, 2797 Teucer, 2920 Automedon, 3564 Talthybius, 4057 Demophon, and 4489 Dracius. He also co-discovered the periodic comet 140P/Bowell-Skiff and the non-periodic comet C/1980 E1.

The outer main-belt asteroid 2246 Bowell was named in his honor. The official naming citation was published on 1 January 1981 (M.P.C. 5688).

Bowell died on August 21, 2023 in Flagstaff, Arizona.

== List of discovered minor planets ==
Bowell discovered 571 minor planets.

List of minor planets discovered by Edward Bowell

Name	Discovery Date	Listing
2246 Bowell	14 December 1979	list
2264 Sabrina	16 December 1979	list
2270 Yazhi	14 March 1980	list
2316 Jo-Ann	2 September 1980	list
2356 Hirons	17 October 1979	list
2357 Phereclos	1 January 1981	list
2383 Bradley	5 April 1981	list
2409 Chapman	17 October 1979	list
2410 Morrison	3 January 1981	list
2411 Zellner	3 May 1981	list
2421 Nininger	17 October 1979	list
2432 Soomana	30 March 1981	list
2433 Sootiyo	5 April 1981	list
2451 Dollfus	2 September 1980	list
2452 Lyot	30 March 1981	list
2494 Inge	4 June 1981	list
2531 Cambridge	11 June 1980	list
2542 Calpurnia	11 February 1980	list
2554 Skiff	17 July 1980	list
2555 Thomas	17 July 1980	list
2569 Madeline	18 June 1980	list
2570 Porphyro	6 August 1980	list
2587 Gardner	17 July 1980	list
2597 Arthur	8 August 1980	list
2598 Merlin	7 September 1980	list
2600 Lumme	9 November 1980	list
2602 Moore	24 January 1982	list
2603 Taylor	30 January 1982	list
2633 Bishop	24 November 1981	list
2634 James Bradley	21 February 1982	list
2635 Huggins	21 February 1982	list
2636 Lassell	20 February 1982	list
2648 Owa	8 November 1980	list
2649 Oongaq	29 November 1980	list
2659 Millis	5 May 1981	list
2660 Wasserman	21 March 1982	list
2685 Masursky	3 May 1981	list
2688 Halley	25 April 1982	list
2695 Christabel	17 October 1979	list
2708 Burns	24 November 1981	list
2709 Sagan	21 March 1982	list
2710 Veverka	23 March 1982	list
2730 Barks	30 August 1981	list
2736 Ops	23 July 1979	list
2759 Idomeneus	14 April 1980	list
2761 Eddington	1 January 1981	list
2762 Fowler	14 January 1981	list
2763 Jeans	24 July 1982	list
2772 Dugan	14 December 1979	list
2796 Kron	13 March 1980	list
2797 Teucer	4 June 1981	list
2812 Scaltriti	30 March 1981	list
2813 Zappalà	24 November 1981	list
2815 Soma	15 September 1982	list
2816 Pien	22 September 1982	list
2817 Perec	17 October 1982	list
2822 Sacajawea	14 March 1980	list
2830 Greenwich	14 April 1980	list
2844 Hess	3 May 1981	list
2845 Franklinken	26 July 1981	list
2863 Ben Mayer	30 August 1981	list
2870 Haupt	4 June 1981	list
2871 Schober	30 August 1981	list
2873 Binzel	28 March 1982	list
2874 Jim Young	13 October 1982	list
2875 Lagerkvist	11 February 1983	list
2878 Panacea	7 September 1980	list
2882 Tedesco	26 July 1981	list
2888 Hodgson	13 October 1982	list
2904 Millman	20 December 1981	list
2905 Plaskett	24 January 1982	list
2917 Sawyer Hogg	2 September 1980	list
2920 Automedon	3 May 1981	list
2929 Harris	24 January 1982	list
2937 Gibbs	14 June 1980	list
2938 Hopi	14 June 1980	list
2939 Coconino	21 February 1982	list
2954 Delsemme	30 January 1982	list
2955 Newburn	30 January 1982	list
2956 Yeomans	28 April 1982	list
2959 Scholl	4 September 1983	list
2984 Chaucer	30 December 1981	list
2985 Shakespeare	12 October 1983	list
3001 Michelangelo	24 January 1982	list
3007 Reaves	17 October 1979	list
3015 Candy	9 November 1980	list
3018 Godiva	21 May 1982	list
3023 Heard	5 May 1981	list
3031 Houston	8 February 1984	list
3032 Evans	8 February 1984	list
3041 Webb	15 April 1980	list
3057 Mälaren	9 March 1981	list
3061 Cook	21 October 1982	list
3062 Wren	14 December 1982	list
3064 Zimmer	28 January 1984	list
3065 Sarahill	8 February 1984	list
3066 McFadden	1 March 1984	list
3077 Henderson	22 September 1982	list
3078 Horrocks	31 March 1984	list
3086 Kalbaugh	4 December 1980	list
3104 Dürer	24 January 1982	list
3106 Morabito	9 March 1981	list
3115 Baily	3 August 1981	list
3116 Goodricke	11 February 1983	list
3123 Dunham	30 August 1981	list
3125 Hay	24 January 1982	list
3131 Mason-Dixon	24 January 1982	list
3160 Angerhofer	14 June 1980	list
3162 Nostalgia	16 December 1980	list
3169 Ostro	4 June 1981	list
3172 Hirst	24 November 1981	list
3173 McNaught	24 November 1981	list
3174 Alcock	26 October 1984	list
3192 A'Hearn	30 January 1982	list
3193 Elliot	20 February 1982	list
3197 Weissman	1 January 1981	list
3208 Lunn	3 May 1981	list
3209 Buchwald	24 January 1982	list
3210 Lupishko	29 November 1983	list
3216 Harrington	4 September 1980	list
3217 Seidelmann	2 September 1980	list
3222 Liller	10 July 1983	list
3236 Strand	24 January 1982	list
3247 Di Martino	30 December 1981	list
3248 Farinella	21 March 1982	list
3253 Gradie	28 April 1982	list
3254 Bus	17 October 1982	list
3255 Tholen	2 September 1980	list
3267 Glo	3 January 1981	list
3275 Oberndorfer	25 April 1982	list
3277 Aaronson	8 January 1984	list
3314 Beals	30 March 1981	list
3315 Chant	8 February 1984	list
3316 Herzberg	6 February 1984	list
3327 Campins	14 August 1985	list
3341 Hartmann	17 July 1980	list
3350 Scobee	8 August 1980	list
3351 Smith	7 September 1980	list
3353 Jarvis	20 December 1981	list
3354 McNair	8 February 1984	list
3355 Onizuka	8 February 1984	list
3356 Resnik	6 March 1984	list
3368 Duncombe	22 August 1985	list
3387 Greenberg	20 November 1981	list
3402 Wisdom	5 August 1981	list
3414 Champollion	19 February 1983	list
3420 Standish	1 March 1984	list
3439 Lebofsky	4 September 1983	list
3452 Hawke	17 July 1980	list
3454 Lieske	24 November 1981	list
3455 Kristensen	20 August 1985	list
3464 Owensby	16 January 1983	list
3478 Fanale	14 December 1979	list
3480 Abante	1 April 1981	list
3485 Barucci	11 July 1983	list
3486 Fulchignoni	5 February 1984	list
3488 Brahic	8 August 1980	list
3506 French	6 February 1984	list
3507 Vilas	21 October 1982	list
3510 Veeder	13 October 1982	list
3526 Jeffbell	5 February 1984	list
3527 McCord	15 April 1985	list
3531 Cruikshank	30 March 1981	list
3537 Jürgen	15 November 1982	list
3545 Gaffey	20 November 1981	list
3549 Hapke	30 December 1981	list
3559 Violaumayer	8 August 1980	list
3564 Talthybius	15 October 1985	list
3574 Rudaux	13 October 1982	list
3590 Holst	5 February 1984	list
3594 Scotti	11 February 1983	list
3595 Gallagher	15 October 1985	list
3612 Peale	13 October 1982	list
3615 Safronov	29 November 1983	list
3638 Davis	20 November 1984	list
3639 Weidenschilling	15 October 1985	list
3647 Dermott	11 January 1986	list
3658 Feldman	13 October 1982	list
3663 Tisserand	15 April 1985	list
3667 Anne-Marie	9 March 1981	list
3670 Northcott	22 January 1983	list
3672 Stevedberg	22 August 1985	list
3673 Levy	22 August 1985	list
3676 Hahn	3 April 1984	list
3677 Magnusson	31 August 1984	list
3688 Navajo	30 March 1981	list
3690 Larson	3 August 1981	list
3692 Rickman	25 April 1982	list
3693 Barringer	15 September 1982	list
3696 Herald	17 July 1980	list
3697 Guyhurst	6 March 1984	list
3698 Manning	29 October 1984	list
3699 Milbourn	29 October 1984	list
3713 Pieters	22 March 1985	list
3714 Kenrussell	12 October 1983	list
3721 Widorn	13 October 1982	list
3726 Johnadams	4 June 1981	list
3736 Rokoske	26 September 1987	list
3748 Tatum	3 May 1981	list
3749 Balam	24 January 1982	list
3751 Kiang	10 July 1983	list
3758 Karttunen	28 November 1983	list
3759 Piironen	8 January 1984	list
3760 Poutanen	8 January 1984	list
3766 Junepatterson	16 January 1983	list
3780 Maury	14 September 1985	list
3783 Morris	7 October 1986	list
3831 Pettengill	7 October 1986	list
3832 Shapiro	30 August 1981	list
3842 Harlansmith	21 March 1985	list
3849 Incidentia	31 March 1984	list
3850 Peltier	7 October 1986	list
3853 Haas	24 November 1981	list
3857 Cellino	8 February 1984	list
3859 Börngen	4 March 1987	list
3869 Norton	3 May 1981	list
3874 Stuart	4 October 1986	list
3900 Knežević	14 September 1985	list
3924 Birch	11 February 1977	list^{[A]}
3931 Batten	1 March 1984	list
3944 Halliday	24 November 1981	list
3947 Swedenborg	1 December 1983	list
3953 Perth	6 November 1986	list
3974 Verveer	28 March 1982	list
3987 Wujek	5 March 1986	list
3991 Basilevsky	26 September 1987	list
4021 Dancey	30 August 1981	list
4024 Ronan	24 November 1981	list
4025 Ridley	24 November 1981	list
4026 Beet	30 January 1982	list
4027 Mitton	21 February 1982	list
4040 Purcell	21 September 1987	list
4056 Timwarner	22 March 1985	list
4057 Demophon	15 October 1985	list
4058 Cecilgreen	4 May 1986	list
4079 Britten	15 February 1983	list
4081 Tippett	14 September 1983	list
4084 Hollis	14 April 1985	list
4087 Pärt	5 March 1986	list
4091 Lowe	7 October 1986	list
4110 Keats	13 February 1977	list
4113 Rascana	18 January 1982	list
4119 Miles	16 January 1983	list
4148 McCartney	11 July 1983	list
4152 Weber	15 May 1985	list
4175 Billbaum	15 April 1985	list
4177 Kohman	21 September 1987	list
4194 Sweitzer	15 September 1982	list
4205 David Hughes	18 December 1985	list
4207 Chernova	5 September 1986	list
4208 Kiselev	6 September 1986	list
4239 Goodman	17 July 1980	list
4247 Grahamsmith	28 November 1983	list
4276 Clifford	2 December 1981	list
4278 Harvey	22 September 1982	list
4281 Pounds	15 October 1985	list
4325 Guest	18 April 1982	list
4326 McNally	28 April 1982	list
4333 Sinton	4 September 1983	list
4337 Arecibo	14 April 1985	list
4338 Velez	14 August 1985	list
4370 Dickens	22 September 1982	list
4373 Crespo	14 August 1985	list
4396 Gressmann	3 May 1981	list
4433 Goldstone	30 August 1981	list
4438 Sykes	29 November 1983	list
4446 Carolyn	15 October 1985	list
4447 Kirov	7 November 1985	list
4476 Bernstein	19 February 1983	list
4481 Herbelin	14 September 1985	list
4489 Dracius	15 January 1988	list
4522 Britastra	22 January 1980	list
4527 Schoenberg	24 July 1982	list
4528 Berg	13 August 1983	list
4529 Webern	1 March 1984	list
4530 Smoluchowski	1 March 1984	list
4532 Copland	15 April 1985	list
4551 Cochran	28 June 1979	list
4553 Doncampbell	15 September 1982	list
4563 Kahnia	17 July 1980	list
4570 Runcorn	14 August 1985	list
4598 Coradini	15 August 1985	list
4664 Hanner	14 August 1985	list
4665 Muinonen	15 October 1985	list
4689 Donn	30 December 1980	list
4693 Drummond	28 November 1983	list
4694 Festou	14 August 1985	list

Name	Discovery Date	Listing
4696 Arpigny	15 October 1985	list
4700 Carusi	6 November 1986	list
4701 Milani	6 November 1986	list
4732 Froeschlé	3 May 1981	list
4735 Gary	9 January 1983	list
4739 Tomahrens	15 October 1985	list
4763 Ride	22 January 1983	list
4764 Joneberhart	11 February 1983	list
4779 Whitley	6 December 1978	list^{[B]}
4788 Simpson	4 October 1986	list
4816 Connelly	3 August 1981	list
4818 Elgar	1 March 1984	list
4822 Karge	4 October 1986	list
4859 Fraknoi	7 October 1986	list
4860 Gubbio	3 March 1987	list
4934 Rhôneranger	15 May 1985	list
5001 EMP	19 September 1987	list
5048 Moriarty	1 April 1981	list
5049 Sherlock	2 November 1981	list
5050 Doctorwatson	14 September 1983	list
5053 Chladni	22 March 1985	list
5054 Keil	12 January 1986	list
5092 Manara	21 March 1982	list
5095 Escalante	10 July 1983	list
5097 Axford	12 October 1983	list
5100 Pasachoff	15 April 1985	list
5105 Westerhout	4 October 1986	list
5110 Belgirate	19 September 1987	list
5111 Jacliff	29 September 1987	list
5162 Piemonte	18 January 1982	list
5166 Olson	22 March 1985	list
5169 Duffell	6 September 1986	list
5170 Sissons	3 March 1987	list
5200 Pamal	11 February 1983	list
5201 Ferraz-Mello	1 December 1983	list
5225 Loral	12 October 1983	list
5226 Pollack	28 November 1983	list
5246 Migliorini	26 July 1979	list
5272 Dickinson	30 August 1981	list
5274 Degewij	14 September 1985	list
5307 Paul-André	30 December 1980	list
5367 Sollenberger	13 October 1982	list
5393 Goldstein	5 March 1986	list
5394 Jurgens	6 March 1986	list
5424 Covington	12 October 1983	list
5463 Danwelcher	15 October 1985	list
5464 Weller	7 November 1985	list
5500 Twilley	24 November 1981	list
5502 Brashear	1 March 1984	list
5504 Lanzerotti	22 March 1985	list
5553 Chodas	6 February 1984	list
5554 Keesey	15 October 1985	list
5555 Wimberly	5 November 1986	list
5636 Jacobson	22 August 1985	list
5672 Libby	6 March 1986	list
5673 McAllister	6 September 1986	list
5674 Wolff	6 September 1986	list
5677 Aberdonia	21 September 1987	list
5715 Kramer	22 September 1982	list
5716 Pickard	17 October 1982	list
5723 Hudson	6 September 1986	list
5767 Moldun	6 September 1986	list
5768 Pittich	4 October 1986	list
5771 Somerville	21 September 1987	list
5805 Glasgow	18 December 1985	list
5806 Archieroy	11 January 1986	list
5861 Glynjones	15 September 1982	list
5943 Lovi	1 March 1984	list
5948 Longo	15 May 1985	list
5951 Alicemonet	7 October 1986	list
5952 Davemonet	4 March 1987	list
5995 Saint-Aignan	20 February 1982	list
5996 Julioangel	11 July 1983	list
6066 Hendricks	26 September 1987	list
6116 Still	26 October 1984	list
6122 Henrard	21 September 1987	list
6151 Viget	19 November 1987	list
6170 Levasseur	5 April 1981	list
6182 Katygord	21 September 1987	list
6205 Menottigalli	17 July 1983	list
6206 Corradolamberti	15 October 1985	list
6280 Sicardy	2 September 1980	list
6287 Lenham	8 January 1984	list
6291 Renzetti	15 October 1985	list
6363 Doggett	6 February 1981	list
6371 Heinlein	15 April 1985	list
6373 Stern	5 March 1986	list
6434 Jewitt	26 July 1981	list
6472 Rosema	15 October 1985	list
6473 Winkler	9 April 1986	list
6474 Choate	21 September 1987	list
6512 de Bergh	21 September 1987	list
6582 Flagsymphony	5 November 1981	list
6584 Ludekpesek	31 March 1984	list
6590 Barolo	15 October 1985	list
6628 Dondelia	24 November 1981	list
6629 Kurtz	17 October 1982	list
6630 Skepticus	15 November 1982	list
6632 Scoon	29 October 1984	list
6698 Malhotra	21 September 1987	list
6770 Fugate	22 August 1985	list
6952 Niccolò	4 May 1986	list
7011 Worley	21 September 1987	list
7077 Shermanschultz	15 November 1982	list
7116 Mentall	2 December 1986	list
7162 Sidwell	15 November 1982	list
7164 Babadzhanov	6 March 1984	list
7165 Pendleton	14 September 1985	list
7166 Kennedy	15 October 1985	list
7169 Linda	4 October 1986	list
7220 Philnicholson	30 August 1981	list
7225 Huntress	22 January 1983	list
7228 MacGillivray	15 April 1985	list
7230 Lutz	12 September 1985	list
7231 Porco	15 October 1985	list
7270 Punkin	7 July 1978	list
7277 Klass	4 September 1983	list
7279 Hagfors	7 November 1985	list
7327 Crawford	6 September 1983	list
7329 Bettadotto	14 April 1985	list
7330 Annelemaître	15 October 1985	list
7331 Balindblad	15 October 1985	list
7333 Bec-Borsenberger	29 September 1987	list
7387 Malbil	30 January 1982	list
7389 Michelcombes	17 October 1982	list
7392 Kowalski	6 March 1984	list
7456 Doressoundiram	17 July 1982	list
7462 Grenoble	20 November 1984	list
7512 Monicalazzarin	15 February 1983	list
7553 Buie	30 March 1981	list
7554 Johnspencer	5 April 1981	list
7561 Patrickmichel	7 October 1986	list
7631 Vokrouhlický	20 November 1981	list
7636 Comba	5 February 1984	list
7638 Gladman	26 October 1984	list
7640 Marzari	14 August 1985	list
7728 Giblin	12 January 1977	list
7737 Sirrah	5 November 1981	list
7740 Petit	6 September 1983	list
7747 Michałowski	19 September 1987	list
7789 Kwiatkowski	2 December 1994	list
7812 Billward	26 October 1984	list
7860 Zahnle	6 August 1980	list
7866 Sicoli	13 October 1982	list
7868 Barker	26 October 1984	list
7911 Carlpilcher	8 September 1977	list
7921 Huebner	15 September 1982	list
7923 Chyba	28 November 1983	list
7925 Shelus	6 September 1986	list
7994 Bethellen	15 February 1983	list
7998 Gonczi	15 May 1985	list
7999 Nesvorný	11 September 1986	list
8067 Helfenstein	7 September 1980	list
8071 Simonelli	5 April 1981	list
8073 Johnharmon	24 January 1982	list
8074 Slade	20 November 1984	list
8075 Roero	14 August 1985	list
8077 Hoyle	12 January 1986	list
8078 Carolejordan	6 September 1986	list
8079 Bernardlovell	4 December 1986	list
8086 Peterthomas	1 September 1989	list
8146 Jimbell	28 November 1983	list
8250 Cornell	2 September 1980	list
8257 Andycheng	28 April 1982	list
8262 Carcich	14 September 1985	list
8323 Krimigis	17 October 1979	list
8340 Mumma	15 October 1985	list
8474 Rettig	15 April 1985	list
8634 Neubauer	5 April 1981	list
8640 Ritaschulz	6 November 1986	list
8809 Roversimonaco	24 November 1981	list
8813 Leviathan	29 November 1983	list
8814 Rosseven	1 December 1983	list
8875 Fernie	22 October 1992	list
9000 Hal	3 May 1981	list
9001 Slettebak	30 August 1981	list
9012 Benner	26 October 1984	list
9013 Sansaturio	14 August 1985	list
9159 McDonnell	26 October 1984	list
9164 Colbert	19 September 1987	list
9295 Donaldyoung	2 September 1983	list
9298 Geake	15 May 1985	list
9300 Johannes	14 August 1985	list
9305 Hazard	7 October 1986	list
9308 Randyrose	21 September 1987	list
9531 Jean-Luc	30 August 1981	list
9537 Nolan	18 January 1982	list
9541 Magri	11 February 1983	list
9542 Eryan	12 October 1983	list
9544 Scottbirney	1 March 1984	list
9550 Victorblanco	15 October 1985	list
9560 Anguita	3 March 1987	list
9563 Kitty	21 September 1987	list
9721 Doty	14 April 1980	list
9836 Aarseth	15 October 1985	list
9930 Billburrows	5 February 1984	list
9934 Caccioppoli	20 October 1985	list
10027 Perozzi	30 March 1981	list
10029 Hiramperkins	30 August 1981	list
10030 Philkeenan	30 August 1981	list
10034 Birlan	30 December 1981	list
10036 McGaha	24 July 1982	list
10042 Budstewart	14 August 1985	list
10043 Janegann	14 August 1985	list
10288 Saville	28 November 1983	list
10461 Dawilliams	6 December 1978	list^{[B]}
10478 Alsabti	24 November 1981	list
10482 Dangrieser	14 September 1983	list
10483 Tomburns	4 September 1983	list
10484 Hecht	28 November 1983	list
10489 Keinonen	15 October 1985	list
10498 Bobgent	11 September 1986	list
10685 Kharkivuniver	9 November 1980	list
10702 Arizorcas	30 August 1981	list
10709 Ottofranz	24 January 1982	list
10716 Olivermorton	29 November 1983	list
10717 Dickwalker	1 December 1983	list
10719 Andamar	15 October 1985	list
10724 Carolraymond	5 November 1986	list
10730 White	19 September 1987	list
11017 Billputnam	16 January 1983	list
11021 Foderà	12 January 1986	list
11022 Serio	5 March 1986	list
11261 Krisbecker	6 December 1978	list^{[B]}
11263 Pesonen	23 July 1979	list
11443 Youdale	11 February 1977	list
11473 Barbaresco	22 September 1982	list
11481 Znannya	22 November 1987	list
12218 Fleischer	15 September 1982	list
12225 Yanfernández	14 August 1985	list
12226 Caseylisse	15 October 1985	list
12234 Shkuratov	6 September 1986	list
(12666) 1978 XW	6 December 1978	list^{[B]}
12999 Toruń	30 August 1981	list
13003 Dickbeasley	21 March 1982	list
13004 Aldaz	15 September 1982	list
(13490) 1984 BZ_{6}	26 January 1984	list
13493 Lockwood	14 August 1985	list
13494 Treiso	14 September 1985	list
13497 Ronstone	5 March 1986	list
13917 Correggia	6 March 1984	list
13920 Montecorvino	15 August 1985	list
13921 Sgarbini	14 September 1985	list
13926 Berners-Lee	2 December 1986	list
13927 Grundy	26 September 1987	list
13928 Aaronrogers	26 October 1987	list
14328 Granvik	8 November 1980	list
14345 Gritsevich	14 August 1985	list
14351 Tomaskohout	6 September 1986	list
14825 Fieber-Beyer	14 September 1985	list
14833 Vilenius	21 September 1987	list
15224 Penttilä	15 May 1985	list
15699 Lyytinen	6 November 1986	list
15703 Yrjölä	21 September 1987	list
16399 Grokhovsky	14 September 1983	list
16402 Olgapopova	26 October 1984	list
16406 Oszkiewicz	14 August 1985	list
17402 Valeryshuvalov	20 October 1985	list
18335 San Cassiano	19 September 1987	list
(19091) 1978 XX	6 December 1978	list^{[B]}
19122 Amandabosh	7 November 1985	list
19123 Stephenlevine	7 October 1986	list
20994 Atreya	15 October 1985	list
22275 Barentsen	18 January 1982	list
22281 Popescu	14 August 1985	list
23443 Kikwaya	4 October 1986	list
(24618) 1978 XD_{1}	6 December 1978	list^{[B]}
24645 Šegon	14 August 1985	list
24646 Stober	14 August 1985	list
26080 Pablomarques	14 March 1980	list
26811 Hiesinger	22 August 1985	list
(32769) 1984 AJ_{1}	8 January 1984	list
(35054) 1983 WK	28 November 1983	list
(39510) 1982 DU	21 February 1982	list
(39512) 1985 TA_{1}	15 October 1985	list
(42480) 1985 RJ	14 September 1985	list
(58144) 1983 WU	29 November 1983	list
(58148) 1987 SH_{4}	29 September 1987	list
(65659) 1983 XE	1 December 1983	list
(69239) 1978 XT	6 December 1978	list^{[B]}
69260 Tonyjudt	13 October 1982	list
(73671) 1984 BH_{6}	26 January 1984	list
90698 Kościuszko	1 March 1984	list
96178 Rochambeau	29 September 1987	list
Co-discovery made with:^{A} C. T. Kowal^{B} A. Warnock
