= Anderson Mesa Station =

Astronomical observatory in Arizona, US

Lowell Observatory, Anderson Mesa Station
- Named after: Anderson Mesa
- Organization: Lowell Observatory, United States Naval Observatory
- Observatory code: 688
- Location: Coconino County, near Flagstaff, Arizona
- Coordinates: 35°05′49″N 111°32′09″W
- Altitude: 7,096 feet (2,163 m)
- Established: 1959
- Website: Lowell Observatory

Telescopes
- Perkins Telescope: 1.8 m Cassegrain telescope
- John S. Hall Telescope: 1.1 m Ritchey–Chrétien telescope
- NURO Telescope: 0.8 m reflecting telescope
- Navy Precision Optical Interferometer: Optical Interferometer

Anderson Mesa Station is an astronomical observatory established in 1959 as a dark-sky observing site for Lowell Observatory. It is located at Anderson Mesa in Coconino County, Arizona, about 12 miles (19 km) southeast of Lowell's main campus on Mars Hill in Flagstaff, Arizona.

== Telescopes ==
=== Current telescopes ===
- The 1.83 m (72 in) Perkins Telescope is shared with Boston University (BU) and Georgia State University. Built in 1931 by Warner & Swasey Company, it was originally located at the Perkins Observatory of Ohio Wesleyan University (OWU) in Delaware, Ohio. It was moved to Anderson Mesa in 1961, and was purchased by Lowell in 1998. Lowell and BU formed a partnership to operate the telescope that year, and GSU joined later. The original 69-inch mirror, which was figured by J. W. Fecker, Inc., was the largest single piece of glass ever cast in America when it was poured. It was replaced in 1965 with the current mirror made of Duran-50 low-expansion glass.
- The 1.07 m (42 in) John Hall Telescope was built by AstroMechanics and installed at Anderson Mesa in 1970. It was named after former Lowell Observatory director John S. Hall in 1990. In 2004, the Ritchey-Chrétien telescope was upgraded with a new mirror from Hextek, and with other parts.
- The 0.79 m (31 in) telescope of the National Undergraduate Research Observatory (NURO) was built by AstroMechanics and installed in 1964 at Anderson Mesa by the U.S. Geological Survey (USGS) for Project Apollo. It was purchased by Lowell in 1972, and refurbished in 1990. It is used by the NURO consortium for up to 60% of the time, and by Lowell scientists.
- The Navy Precision Optical Interferometer (NPOI) is collaboration of Lowell Observatory, the U.S. Naval Observatory (USNO) Flagstaff Station (NOFS), and the U.S. Naval Research Laboratory (NRL). Construction on the facility began in 1992, and engineering tests began in 1994. The first images were acquired in 1996.

=== Former telescopes ===
- The 0.6 m (24 in) Lowell Observatory Near-Earth-Object Search (LONEOS) Schmidt camera was used to search for asteroids and other near-Earth objects. It was built by J. W. Fecker, Inc. in 1939, given to Perkins Observatory in the 1950s, and purchased by Lowell in 1990. Starting in 1992 it was refurbished, and saw first light in the dome that previously held the Lowell Astrograph in 1997. Use of the telescope ended along with the LONEOS project in 2008.
- The 0.33 m (13 in) Abbot L. Lowell Astrograph, also known as the Pluto Discovery Telescope and informally as the Pluto Camera, is an astrograph built by Alvan Clark & Sons in 1929. In 1930 it was used by Clyde Tombaugh to discover Pluto. In 1971, it was moved a new building at Anderson Mesa, and returned to Mars Hill in 1992.

== See also ==
- United States Naval Observatory Flagstaff Station
- List of astronomical observatories
