= Comet Russell =

Comet Russell or Russell's Comet may refer to the five comets discovered by Australian astronomer, Kenneth S. Russell, below:

- 83D/Russell 1
- 89P/Russell 2
- 91P/Russell 3
- 94P/Russell 4
- C/1980 R1 (Russell)

It may also be a partial reference to comets he co-discovered with other astronomers:

- 156P/Russell–LINEAR
- 262P/McNaught–Russell
- C/1989 Y2 (McKenzie–Russell)
- C/1991 C3 (McNaught–Russell)
- C/1991 Q1 (McNaught–Russell)
- C/1991 R1 (McNaught–Russell)
- C/1993 Y1 (McNaught–Russell)
- C/1996 P2 (Russell–Watson)
