= 3714 Kenrussell =

Main-belt asteroid

Discovery
- Discovered by: E. Bowell
- Discovery site: Anderson Mesa Stn.
- Discovery date: 12 October 1983

Designations
- Named after: Kenneth S. Russell (Australian astronomer)
- Alternative designations: 1983 TT_{1} · 1973 FK; 1979 XT · 1981 FH_{1} 1987 ST_{2}
- Minor planet category: main-belt · (middle); Eunomia

Orbital characteristics
- Epoch 23 March 2018 (JD 2458200.5)
- Uncertainty parameter 0
- Observation arc: 44.82 yr (16,370 d)
- Aphelion: 3.0171 AU
- Perihelion: 2.1090 AU
- Semi-major axis: 2.5630 AU
- Eccentricity: 0.1771
- Orbital period (sidereal): 4.10 yr (1,499 days)
- Mean anomaly: 121.37°
- Mean motion: 0° 14^{m} 24.72^{s} / day
- Inclination: 14.362°
- Longitude of ascending node: 29.616°
- Argument of perihelion: 22.848°

Physical characteristics
- Dimensions: 8.36 km (calculated); 10.440±2.413 km 11.260±0.108 km
- Synodic rotation period: 5.2518±0.0005 h
- Geometric albedo: 0.1057±0.0228; 0.1189±0.0615; 0.21 (assumed)
- Spectral type: S (assumed)
- Absolute magnitude (H): 12.70 · 12.8

3714 Kenrussell, provisional designation 1983 TT_{1}, is a Eunomian asteroid from the central regions of the asteroid belt, approximately 10 kilometers (6 miles) in diameter. It was discovered on 12 October 1983, by American astronomer Edward Bowell at the Anderson Mesa Station near Flagstaff, Arizona, in the United States. It was named for Australian astronomer Kenneth S. Russell. The presumably stony asteroid has a rotation period of 5.25 hours.

== Orbit and classification ==
Kenrussell is a member of the Eunomia family (502), a prominent family of stony asteroids and the largest one in the intermediate main belt with more than 5,000 identified members.

It orbits the Sun in the central asteroid belt at a distance of 2.1–3.0 AU once every 4 years and 1 month (1,499 days; semi-major axis 2.56 AU). Its orbit has an eccentricity of 0.18 and an inclination of 14° with respect to the ecliptic.

The body's observation arc begins with its first observation as 1973 FK at the Cerro El Roble Station in March 1973, more than 10 years prior to its official discovery observation at Anderson Mesa.

== Physical characteristics ==
Based on its family membership, Kenrussell is an assumed stony S-type asteroid.

=== Rotation period ===
In December 2016, a rotational lightcurve of Kenrussell was obtained from photometric observations by French amateur astronomer Matthieu Conjat . Lightcurve analysis gave a well-defined rotation period of 5.2518 hours with a brightness amplitude of 0.28 magnitude (U=3).

=== Diameter and albedo ===
According to the survey carried out by the NEOWISE mission of NASA's Wide-field Infrared Survey Explorer, Kenrussell measures 10.440 and 11.260 kilometers in diameter and its surface has an albedo of 0.1189 and 0.1057, respectively.

The Collaborative Asteroid Lightcurve Link assumes an albedo of 0.21 – derived from 15 Eunomia, the family's parent body – and calculates a diameter of 8.36 kilometers based on an absolute magnitude of 12.7.

== Naming ==
This minor planet was named after Australian astronomer Kenneth S. Russell, a long-time operator of the 1.2-metre UK Schmidt Telescope at the Siding Spring Observatory in Australia. He is a discoverer of minor planets, (17483) and (306376) as well as several periodic comets including 83D/Russell, 89P/Russell, 91P/Russell and 94P/Russell. The official naming citation was published by the Minor Planet Center on 31 May 1988 (M.P.C. 13177).
