= Sanguin =

Sanguin may refer to:

- Antoine Sanguin (1493–1559), French cleric and courtier
- Juan G. Sanguin (1933–2006), Argentine astronomer
- 5081 Sanguin, a minor planet discovered in 1976
- 92P/Sanguin, a Jupiter-family comet discovered in 1977

== See also ==
- Sanguine (disambiguation)
