= 82P/Gehrels =

Encke-type comet

Discovery
- Discovered by: Tom Gehrels
- Discovery site: Palomar Observatory
- Discovery date: 27 October 1975

Designations
- MPC designation: P/1975 U1; P/1984 P1
- Alternative designations: Gehrels 3; 1977 VII, 1985 IV, 1993 XIV; 1975o, 1984l, 1992v

Orbital characteristics
- Epoch: 25 February 2023 (JD 2460000.5)
- Observation arc: 44.56 years (Note: Observation arc from the Minor Planet Center database covering dates from 27 October 1975 until 20 May 2025.)
- Number of observations: 149
- Aphelion: 4.638 AU
- Perihelion: 3.629 AU
- Semi-major axis: 4.133 AU
- Eccentricity: 0.12207
- Orbital period: 8.403 years
- Inclination: 1.1259°
- Longitude of ascending node: 239.25°
- Argument of periapsis: 226.43°
- Mean anomaly: 200.37°
- Last perihelion: 28 June 2018
- Next perihelion: 14 November 2026
- T_{Jupiter}: 3.027
- Earth MOID: 2.643 AU
- Jupiter MOID: 0.517 AU

Physical characteristics
- Dimensions: 1.46 km (0.91 mi)
- Comet total magnitude (M1): 7.6
- Comet nuclear magnitude (M2): 16.4

82P/Gehrels is a periodic comet that was discovered on 27 October 1975, by Tom Gehrels at the Palomar Mountain Observatory in California having a faint nuclear brightness of magnitude 17.

Calculations based on the early sightings gave an estimated perihelion of 23 April 1975 and an orbital period of 8.11 years. It was observed by J. Gibson on its next predicted apparition in 1984, using the 122-cm Schmidt at Palomar, when he estimated the nuclear brightness at a very faint magnitude 20. It has since been observed in 1993, 2001 and 2010.

The object has been identified as a quasi-Hilda comet, which means it is near a 3:2 mean-motion resonance with the planet Jupiter. It fits the definition of an Encke-type comet with (T_{Jupiter} > 3; a < a_{Jupiter}). It has an estimated diameter of 1.46 km (0.91 mi).

On 15 August 1970 the comet passed 0.00143 AU (214,000 km; 133,000 mi) from Jupiter.

== See also ==
- Comet Gehrels
  - C/1972 F1 (Gehrels)
  - 64P/Swift–Gehrels
  - 78P/Gehrels 2
  - 90P/Gehrels 1
  - 270P/Gehrels

== Notes ==
Numbered comets
Previous; 81P/Wild	82P/Gehrels	Next; 83D/Russell
