= 2061 (disambiguation) =

2061 is a year in the 2060s decade.

2061 may also refer to:

- The year 2061 BC in the 21st century BC
- 2061: Odyssey Three, a novel by Arthur C. Clarke
- 2061: An Exceptional Year, a 2007 Italian film
- 2061 Anza, an amor asteroid
