= Sh 2-174 =

Planetary Nebula in the constellation Cepheus

Nebula
- Planetary Nebula
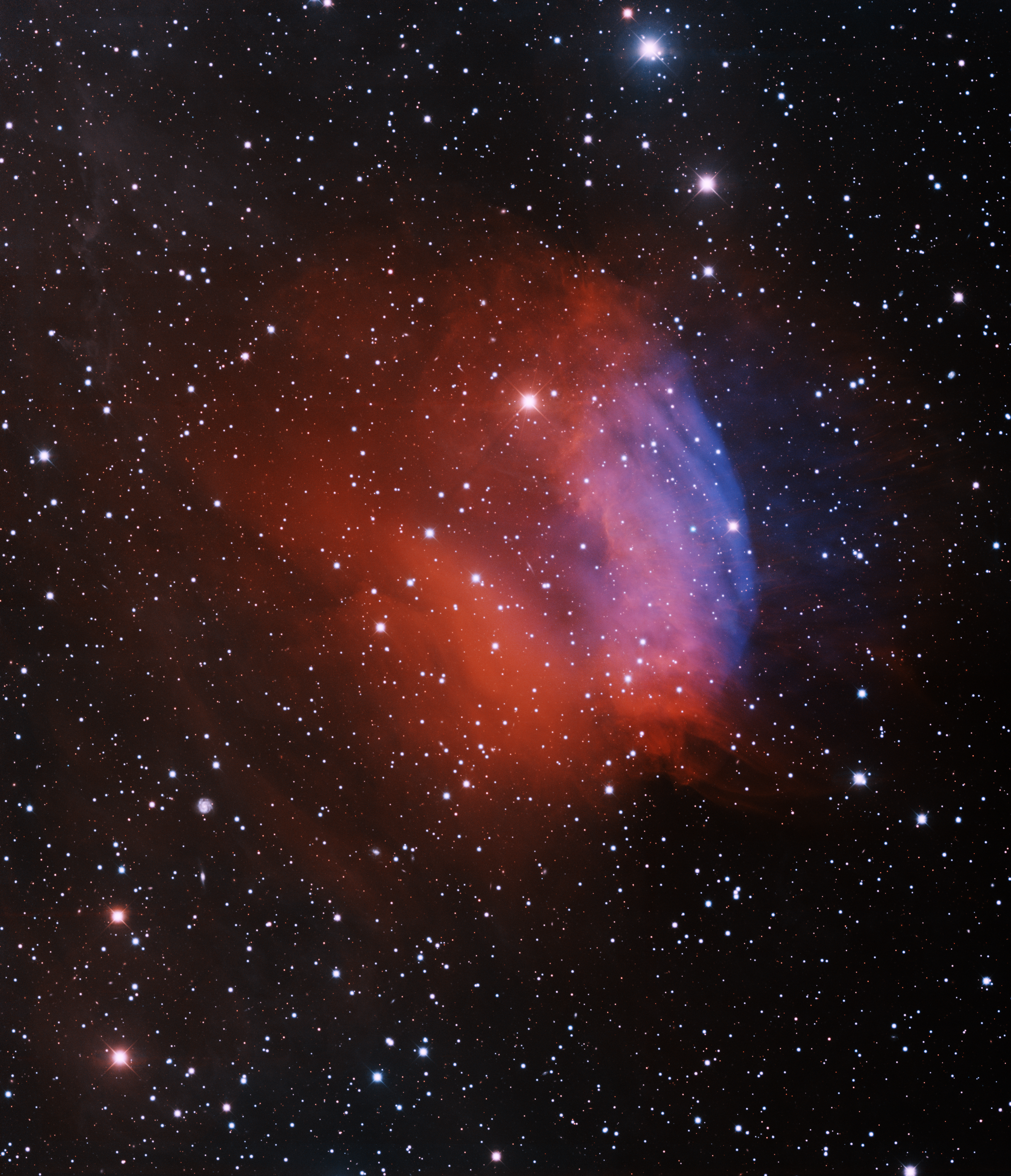
- Sh 2-174 imaged by Nicholas U. Mayall Telescope

Observation data: epoch
- Right ascension: 23^{h} 45^{m} 2.27^{s}
- Declination: +80° 56′ 59.6″
- Distance: 980 ly
- Designations: SH 2-174, LBN 598, PK 120+18 1, PN G120.3+18.3

Sh 2-174 (also known as Valentine Rose Nebula) is a planetary nebula located in the constellation of Cepheus. It is one of the northernmost objects in the Sharpless catalog and has been the subject of debate regarding whether it is a planetary nebula interacting with the interstellar medium or an emission nebula ionized by a hot white dwarf.

== Discovery ==
Stewart Sharpless cataloged the object in 1959 as part of his Sharpless catalog of H II regions, based on red-sensitive photographic plates from the Palomar Observatory Sky Survey. He described it as a faint irregular nebula with a maximum diameter of about 10 arcminutes.

== Observations ==
The white dwarf was catalogued as GD 561 (WD 2342+806). It was first identified by American astronomer Henry L. Giclas in 1970. In 1993, R. Napiwotzki and D. Schönberner's observation of GD 561 showed similarities to the central stars of other known planetary nebulae such as Sh 2-216 and the Helix Nebula. In 1994, R.W. Tweedy and R. Napiwotzki confirmed the physical association between the planetary nebula and white dwarf GD 561 and found the white dwarf was outside the planetary nebula.
