= Lucan portrait of Leonardo da Vinci =

Late 15th- or early 16th-century portrait

Lucanian portrait of Leonardo da Vinci
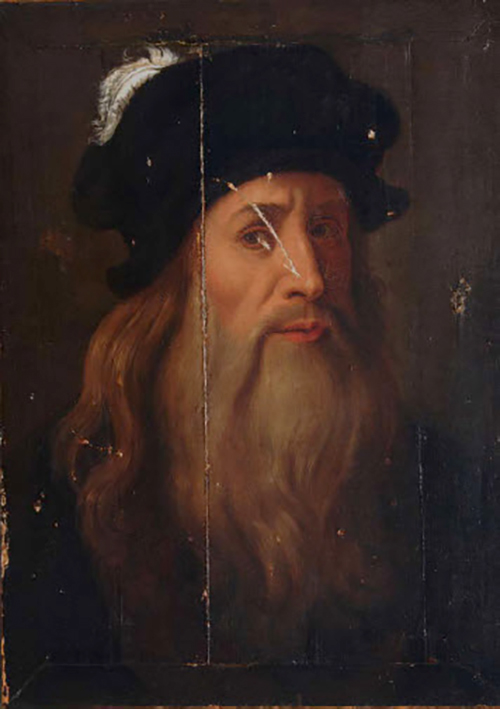
- Artist: Unknown
- Year: 1505–1510
- Medium: tempera grassa on panel
- Dimensions: 60 cm × 40 cm (24 in × 16 in)
- Location: Museo delle Antiche Genti di Lucania; Vaglio Basilicata
- Owner: Museo delle Antiche Genti di Lucania

The Lucan portrait of Leonardo da Vinci is a late 15th- or early 16th-century portrait of a man. The picture was discovered in 2008 in a cupboard of a private house in Italy.

In composition, it strongly resembles a portrait of Leonardo da Vinci held by the Uffizi Gallery and is generally believed to be a 19th century forgery. In size, style and medium it resembles a portrait of Leonardo by Cristofano dell'Altissimo, painted posthumously for the Medici and also held by the Uffizi. The painting was previously thought by its owners to represent Galileo but on its discovery a claim was made that it is a self-portrait by Leonardo da Vinci. Alessandro Vezzosi, director of the Museo Ideale Leonardo da Vinci at Vinci, said in 2011 that he had excluded the possibility that it was a self-portrait but that the painting "remains intriguing because it adds a new element to the Leonardo puzzle".

Painted in tempera grassa on panel, 60 by 44 centimetres (24 in × 17 in), it depicts a man in three-quarter view, with a long beard and wearing a dark hat. In 2019 it was exhibited in Madrid along with other material related to Leonardo. It is usually in the Museo delle Antiche Genti di Lucania (Museum of the Ancient Peoples of Lucania) in Vaglio Basilicata, a region of Southern Italy.

In 2008, Nicola Barbatelli, Director of the Museo, discovered the painting, attributed it to Leonardo, and gave it the name Lucan portrait, from Lucania, the ancient name of Basilicata. In 2010 a conference was held at which a team comprising David Bershad, Professor at University of Calgary (Canada); Peter Hohenstatt, Professor at the University of Parma; Felice Festa, Professor of Orthodontics and Gnathology at the D'Annunzio University of Chieti–Pescara; and Nicola Barbatelli, presented the findings in support of Barbatelli's attribution.

In 2017, the University of Malta refused permission for an exhibition in which the Lucan portrait was meant to be the centrepiece, citing doubts by its art history department over the attribution to Leonardo. Nicola Barbatelli has however dismissed this decision, stating that the university did not have academics "with sufficient expertise on the subject".

== Provenance ==
The painting was found in 2008 by Nicola Barbatelli, director of the Museo delle Antiche Genti di Lucania, in the private collection of an aristocratic family at Acerenza, a village on the river Bradano near Potenza in Basilicata. The family, who asked to remain anonymous, believed it to be a portrait of Galileo. According to Professor Peter Hohenstatt of the University of Parma, the portrait is listed on page 116 of Napoli Antica e Moderna, vol. I (1815) edited by Abate Domenico Romanelli, as being the work of Leonardo da Vinci and located in the Palazzo Baranello nella strada Cedronia of the Duke of Baranello, of the noble family Russo.

== Description ==
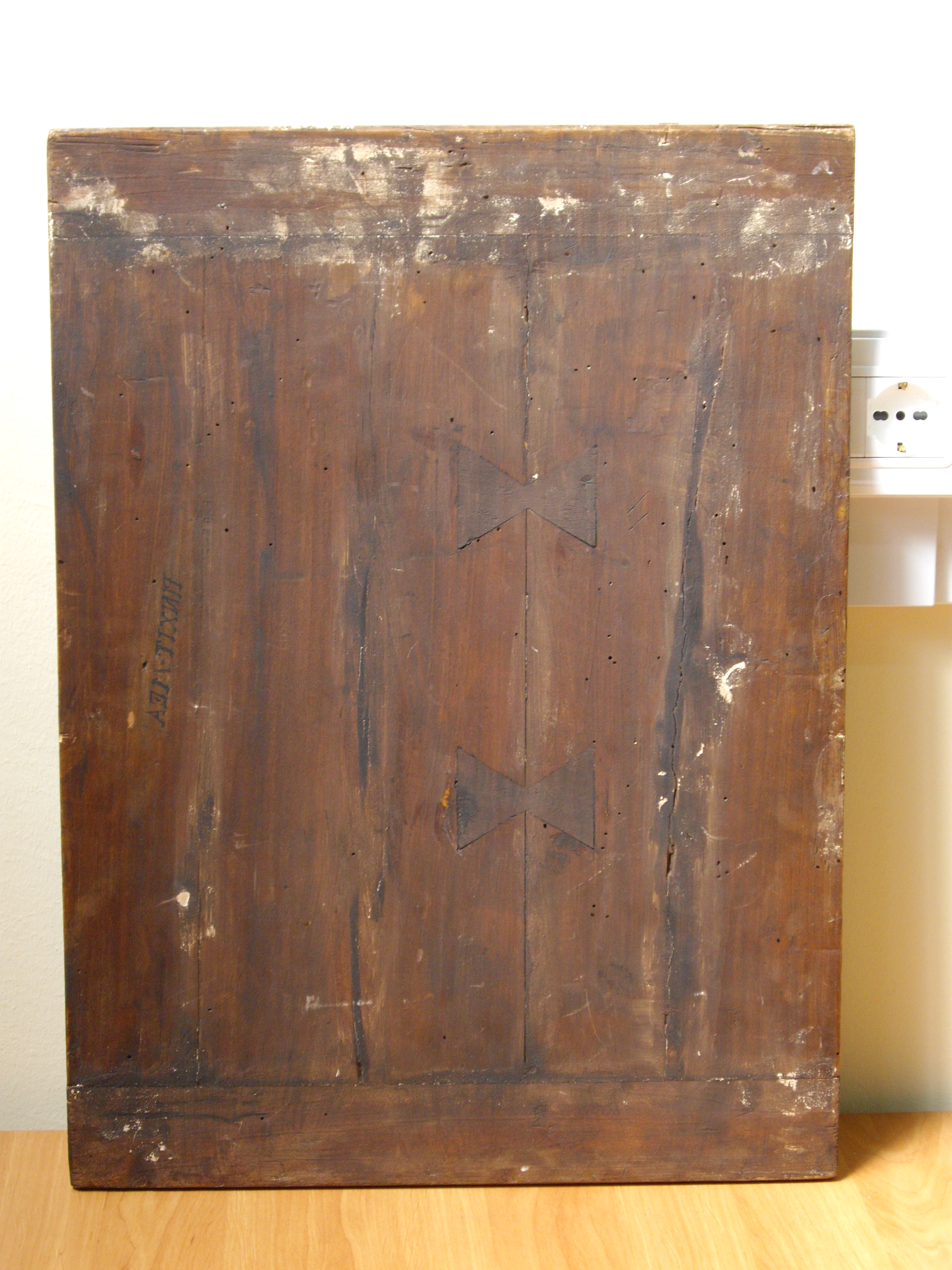
The reverse of the panel on which the portrait is painted

The painting, in tempera grassa on a wooden panel made of poplar 60 by 44 centimetres (24 in × 17 in) is of a man dressed in a dark garment, wearing a black hat with a small upturned brim. The man's skin is pale, his eyes blue, and his hair and beard are greying. The figure is set against a dark greyish monochrome background and is brightly lit from the left of the picture, illuminating the right-hand side of the sitter's face, and casting a shadow across the left-hand side. The gaze of the figure is turned towards the viewer.

The identification of this portrait as Leonardo da Vinci is based upon comparison with several representations of the artist, including a very similar portrait in the Uffizi, the red chalk portrait in Turin and the red chalk portrait by Francesco Melzi in Windsor, and others.

The panel is constructed of two main vertical sections of wood of irregular width and joined with two inset butterfly joints. There are narrow horizontal sections of timber at the top and bottom of the panel. These sections have half-lapped mitre joints to the verticals, visible at the front of the panel. The rear of the panel has the words "PINXIT MEA" painted on it. It is written in Roman capital letters, in "mirror writing" so that the whole inscription is reversed and reads from right to left. The inscription runs down the left side of the reverse of the painting, rather than across it.

The image on the panel is painted using a mixture of egg and oil as a medium over a ground of white gesso, which is visible in damaged areas and on parts of the back of the panel. The surface of the paint has cracked down the main joint and separated in several other places. There are several areas of abrasion to the surface of the painting, the most serious damage being two scrapes across the face, one of which extends from the nostril across the corner of the eye to the brim of his hat, and another which extends from the nostril to the pupil.

It is apparent that there is some overpainting to the subject's left eye and cheek, and probably the mouth. There is a small curling white feather adorning the hat, which is an apparent addition.

== Analysis ==
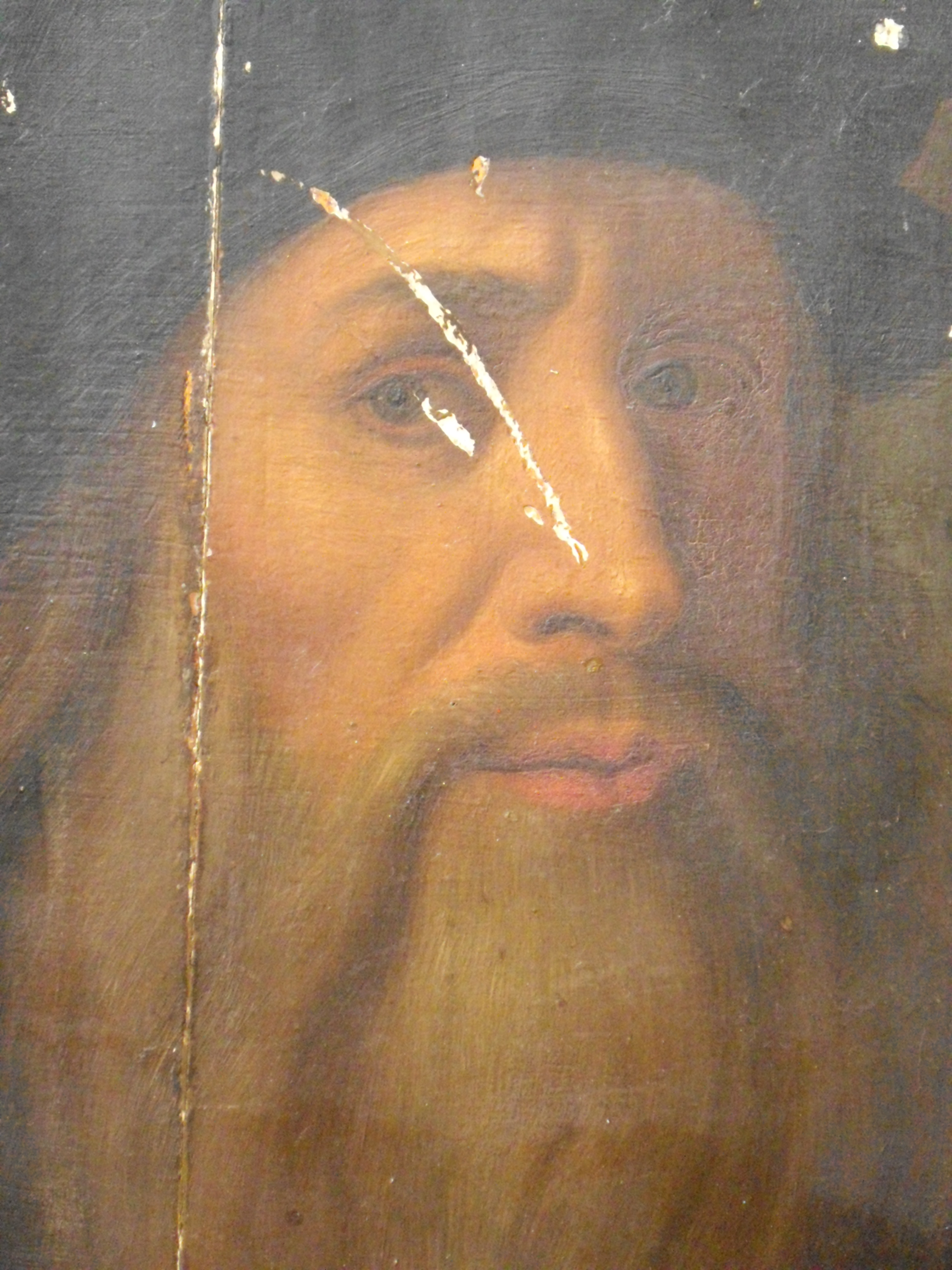
Detail revealing paint, craquelure, damage, and overpainting

Upon its discovery by Nicola Barbatelli, the painting was subjected to an initial examination by Alessandro Vezzosi, director of the Museo Ideale Leonardo da Vinci at Vinci, who confirmed that the painting appeared to be from the Renaissance period. Vezzosi was reported, in February 2009, as investigating whether the painting was the work of a minor 16th-century artist Cristofano dell'Altissimo. Altissimo executed numerous portraits of famous men for Cosimo I de' Medici, Grand Duke of Tuscany, some of them after the Giovio Series, including a profile of Leonardo based on the red chalk profile drawing in the Royal Collection attributed to Leonardo's companion Francesco Melzi. Vezzosi later dismissed the early conjecture that it was by dell'Altisimo.

In February 2009, two months after the painting's discovery, Vezzosi had been erroneously quoted by The Times as saying he had excluded the possibility that the work was "a self-portrait painted by Leonardo himself" and that examination of the inscription "pinxit mea" on the reverse of the panel indicated that it was "a later addition". Vezzosi was later to say "We need to find out the exact dating of this portrait. I have excluded the possibility that we are dealing with a self-portrait painted by Leonardo himself. Nevertheless, the Acerenza portrait is intriguing because it adds a new element to the Leonardo's puzzle. Here we have Leonardo depicted as a middle-aged, blue-eyed man."

Since that time, the focus of attention and research has been directed at proving the painting to be the work of Leonardo da Vinci. The Vaglia Basilicata City Council then funded an investigation by a team of scientists, many of whom were from non-art related disciplines, to report upon anything which could be tested to either support or deny the attribution to Leonardo.

A preliminary cleaning of the painting was carried out by Professor Giancarlo Napoli of the Suor Orsola Benincasa University in Naples, and revealed micro-cracking (craquelure) of the paint surface, which cannot be reproduced artificially, and supported a Renaissance date. Further investigation was carried out by a body of specialists in different fields, including INNOVA, CIRCE, University of Naples, Cybernetics - National Research Council, and University Suor Orsola Benincasa.

The INNOVA centre of the Federico II University of Naples, headed by Prof. Terrasi, researched the physical properties of the painting, including the ground, medium, and pigments, and identifying restored areas. Gaetano Di Pasquale of the University of Naples confirmed the wood of the panel to be Populus, common throughout Italy. Carbon 14 dating gave 64% chance the wood of the panel dated between 1459 and 1523, making it contemporary with Leonardo, who was born in 1452 and died in 1519. The pigments were investigated using energy-dispersive X-ray fluorescence analysis (ED-XRF) and were shown, in the unrestored areas, to be compatible in age with the panel and showed no trace of modern pigments in the unrestored areas; however, the feather was revealed to have been painted in a "modern" titanium-based pigment not used in other parts of the painting.

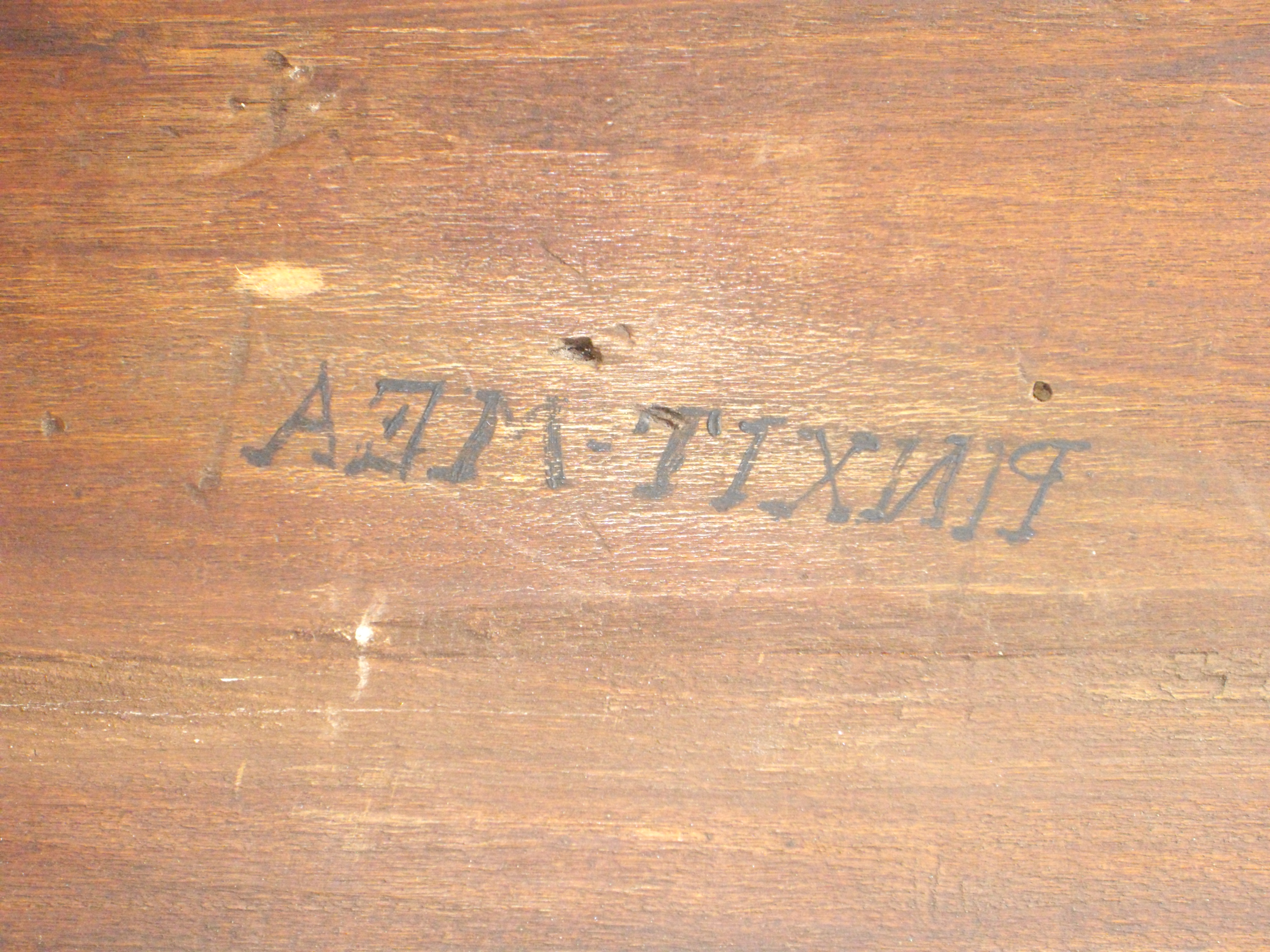
The inscription PINXIT-MEA.

The painting was examined with a Scanning Magnetic Microscope at a 100 μm resolution by Dr Hector Sarno of INNOVA to compose a magnetic map of the painting and to check for illegible letters. Cleaning of the back of the board revealed the reversed inscription "PINXIT MEA" written in iron gall, an ink commonly used by Leonardo. An analysis of the handwriting by graphologist Silvana Iuliano, revealed compatibility with the script used by Leonardo in the Atlantic Codex.

An analysis of the soft tissue of the face, applying methods used in facial surgery, was made by Prof. Felice Festa of the D'Annunzio University of Chieti–Pescara. The painted image was subject to detailed computer analysis and 3D imaging by Prof. Orest Kormashov, University of Tallinn, Estonia; Gianni Glinni, an engineer for the Museum of Antiche Genti di Lucania, and Helen Kokk, an expert in 3D graphic design. The recreated three-dimensional image was compared with other images believed to represent Leonardo da Vinci, including the iconic red chalk in Turin, the profile drawing believed to be by Leonardo's pupil Francesco Melzi, the painted portrait in the Uffizi and the recently discovered image in the Codex on the Flight of Birds. A conclusion was that all the images, but one, reveal a face that is elongated in the lower two-thirds. The image that did not comply was the red chalk so-called self-portrait in Turin, considered by some to be of Leonardo in old age.

Luigi Capasso, of the D'Annunzio University of Chieti–Pescara, and Col. Gianfranco De Fulvio, RIS-Ra.C.I.S. Command of the Carabinieri led an investigation into three fingerprints they found in the paint of the Lucan painting and found one of them to be "unambiguous" with the left index fingerprint on the ebony beads of Leonardo's Lady with an Ermine.

== Attribution ==
It is attributed to Leonardo by art historian Peter Hohenstatt (University of Parma). Art historian David Bershad (University of Calgary), who participated with Hohenstatt in an examination of the portrait in May 2010, later said "there's not enough evidence to sustain an attribution", describing the painting's style as unlike any work by Leonardo.

== Gallery of other portraits ==
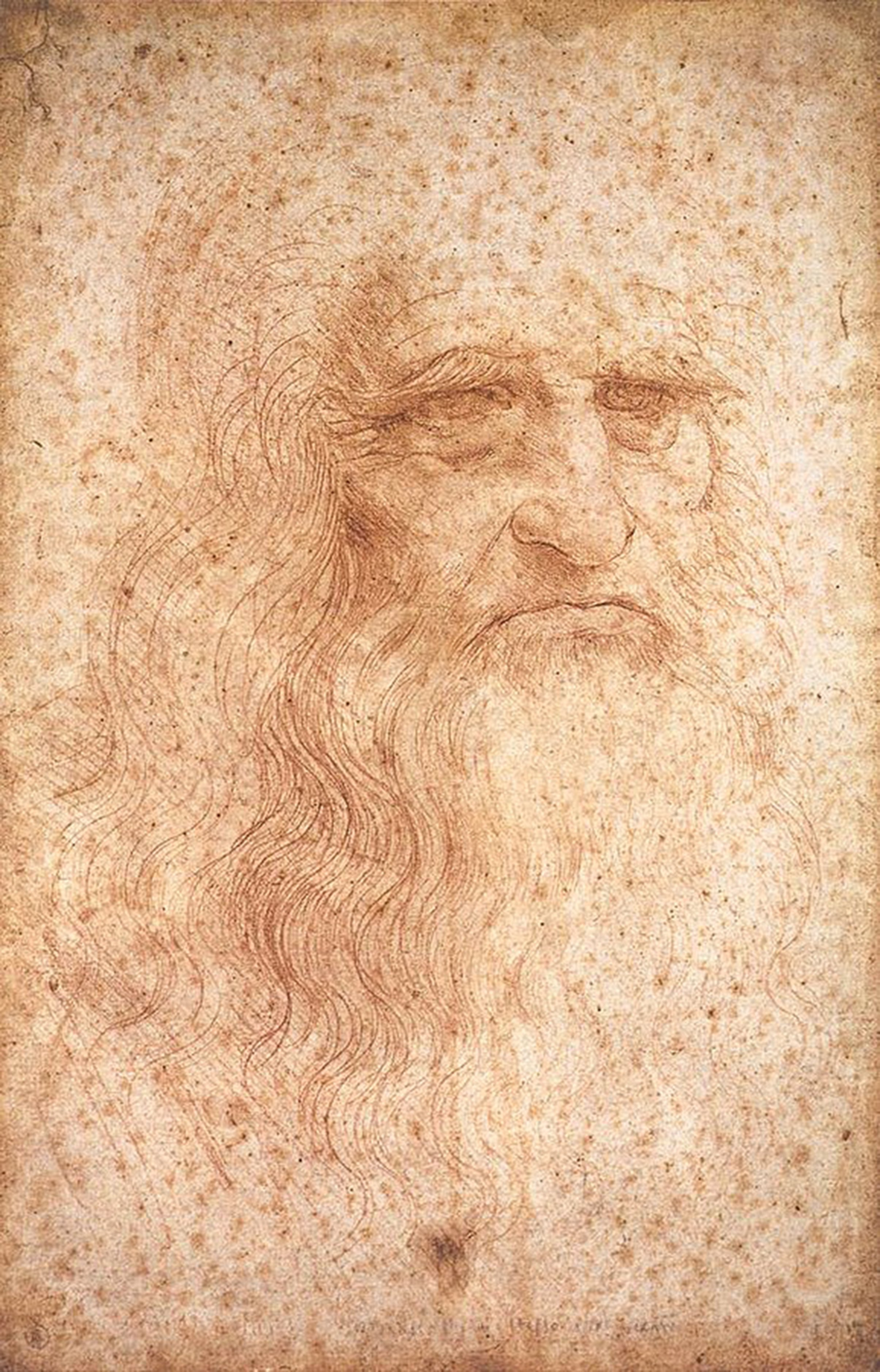
Possible self-portrait, Turin.

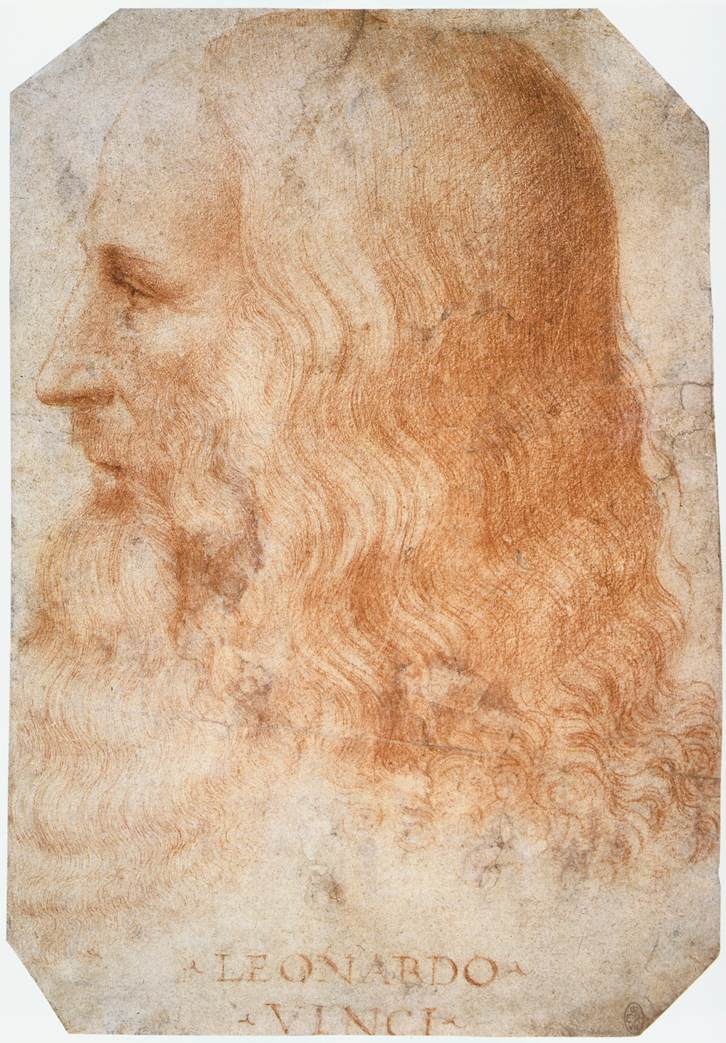
Portrait of Leonardo by his pupil and assistant Francesco Melzi.

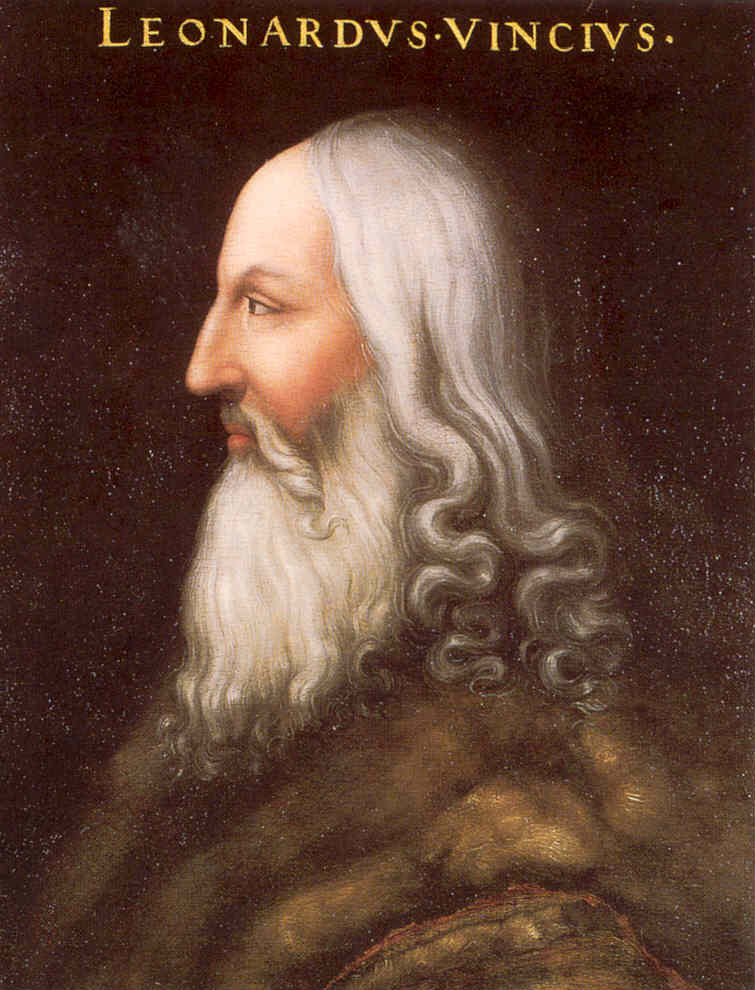
Posthumous portrait of Leonardo by Cristofano dell'Altissimo based on the Melzi's drawing (Uffizi Gallery).

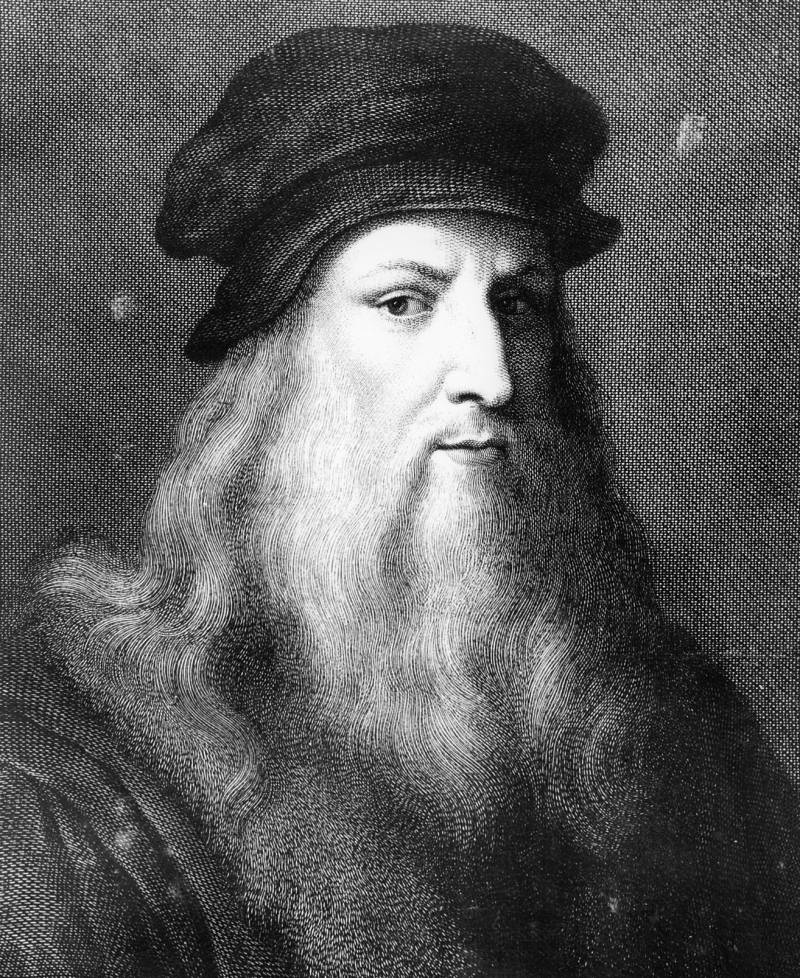
19th century engraving by Raffaello Sanzio Morghen of a late posthumous portrait of Leonardo in the Uffizi previously regarded as a portrait from life. Close similarity to the Lucan portrait suggests that one derives from the other or from a similar original.

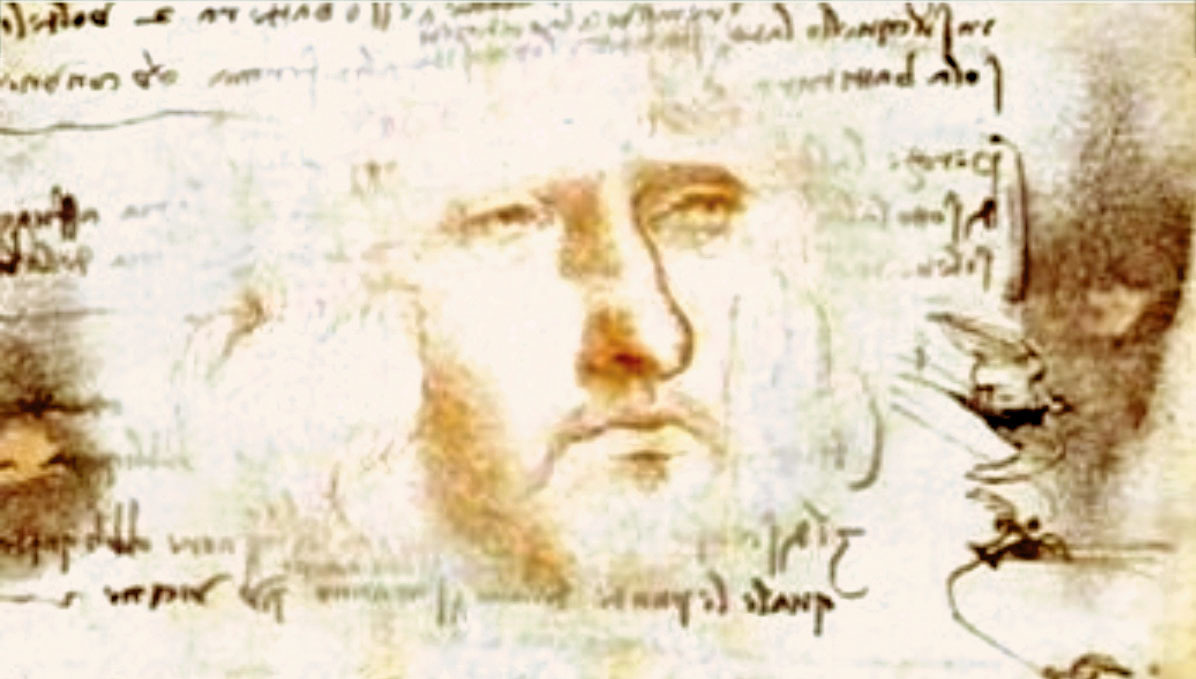
A recently discovered image from the Codex on the Flight of Birds, digitally enhanced to make it clearly visible.
