= 94P/Russell =

Encke-type comet

94P/Russell 4
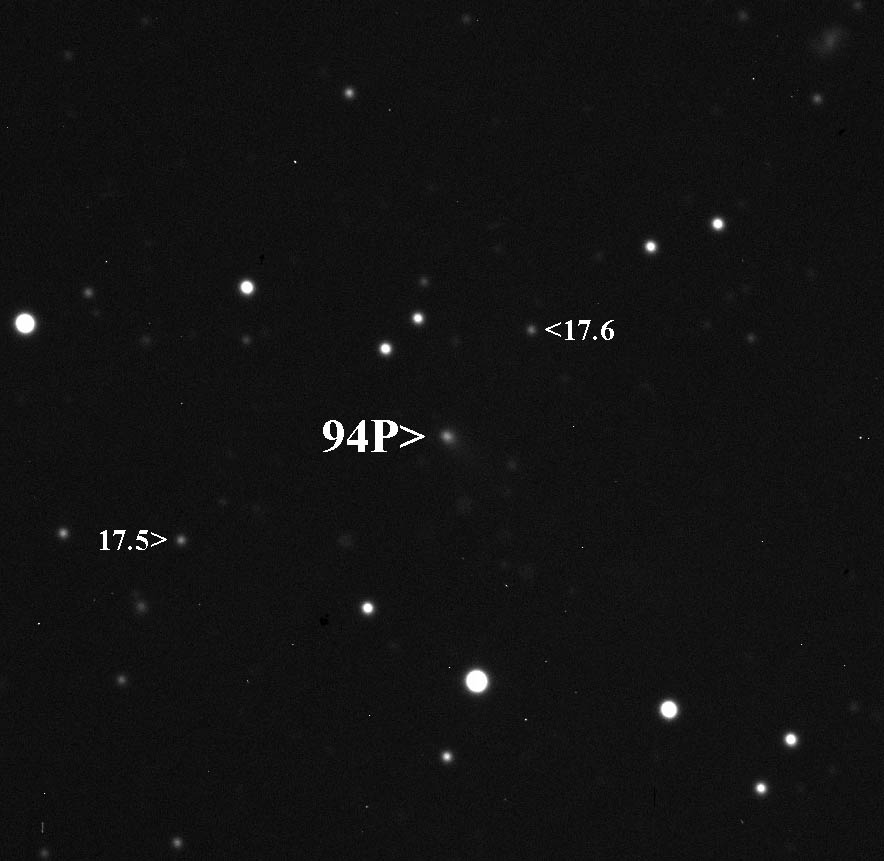
- Comet Russell 4 imaged by Kevin Heider on 19 February 2010 while it was 2.2 AU from the Sun.

Discovery
- Discovered by: Kenneth S. Russell
- Discovery site: Siding Spring Observatory
- Discovery date: 7 March 1984

Designations
- MPC designation: P/1984 E1, P/1989 X2
- Alternative designations: Russell 4; 1984 I, 1990 XI; 1984d, 1989g1

Orbital characteristics
- Epoch: 21 November 2025 (JD 2461000.5)
- Observation arc: 75.27 years (Note: Observation arc from the Minor Planet Center database covering dates from 10 May 1950 until 16 August 2025.)
- Earliest precovery date: 10 May 1950
- Number of observations: 2,242
- Aphelion: 4.795 AU
- Perihelion: 2.225 AU
- Semi-major axis: 3.509 AU
- Eccentricity: 0.36616
- Orbital period: 6.575 yr
- Inclination: 6.187°
- Longitude of ascending node: 70.842°
- Argument of periapsis: 92.377°
- Mean anomaly: 137.10°
- Last perihelion: 21 May 2023
- Next perihelion: 17 December 2029
- T_{Jupiter}: 3.003
- Earth MOID: 1.251 AU
- Jupiter MOID: 0.462 AU

Physical characteristics
- Mean radius: 2.6 km (1.6 mi)
- Synodic rotation period: 20.7 hours
- Geometric albedo: 0.043±0.007
- Spectral type: (V–R) = 0.62±0.05
- Comet total magnitude (M1): 13.4

94P/Russell, also known as Comet Russell 4, is an Encke-type comet with a 6.58-year orbit around the Sun. It is the fifth comet discovered overall by Australian astronomer, Kenneth S. Russell. (Note: Kenneth S. Russell's prior comet discoveries from 1979 to 1983 were; 83D/Russell, C/1980 R1, 89P/Russell, and 91P/Russell, respectively.)

== Observational history ==
It was discovered by Kenneth S. Russell on photographic plates taken by M. Hawkins on March 7, 1984. In the discovery images, Russell estimated that the comet had an apparent magnitude of 13 and a noticeable tail of 5 arcminutes. In the year of discovery, the comet had come to perihelion in January 1984.

== Orbit ==
With an aphelion of 4.7 AU (700 million km), comet 94P currently has an orbit contained completely inside of the orbit of Jupiter. It fits the definition of an Encke-type comet with (T_{Jupiter} > 3; a < a_{Jupiter}).

== Physical characteristics ==
In July 1995, 94P was estimated to have a radius of about 2.6 km (1.6 mi) with an absolute magnitude (H) of 15.1. It may have a very elongated nucleus with an axial ratio of a/b ≥ 3. It is determined that it has a rotation period of 20.7 hours.

== Notes ==
Numbered comets
Previous; 93P/Lovas	94P/Russell	Next; 95P/Chiron
