= Sanguine =

Sanguine may refer to:

- Sanguine (red chalk), a red pigment used in art
- Sanguine temperament, a personality type, one of the four temperaments
- Blood red, a dark shade meant to resemble the color of human blood
- Sanguine (heraldry), a tincture of a blood-red color
- Sanguine, a fruit, type of blood orange
- HMS Sanguine, a submarine built for the Royal Navy in 1945
- Project Sanguine, a 1968 US Navy research project for radio communication with submarines
- Sanguine (band), a British alt-metal band formed in 2004

== See also ==
- Sanguin (disambiguation)
- Sanguino
