= Portrait of a Man in Red Chalk =

Drawing by Leonardo da Vinci

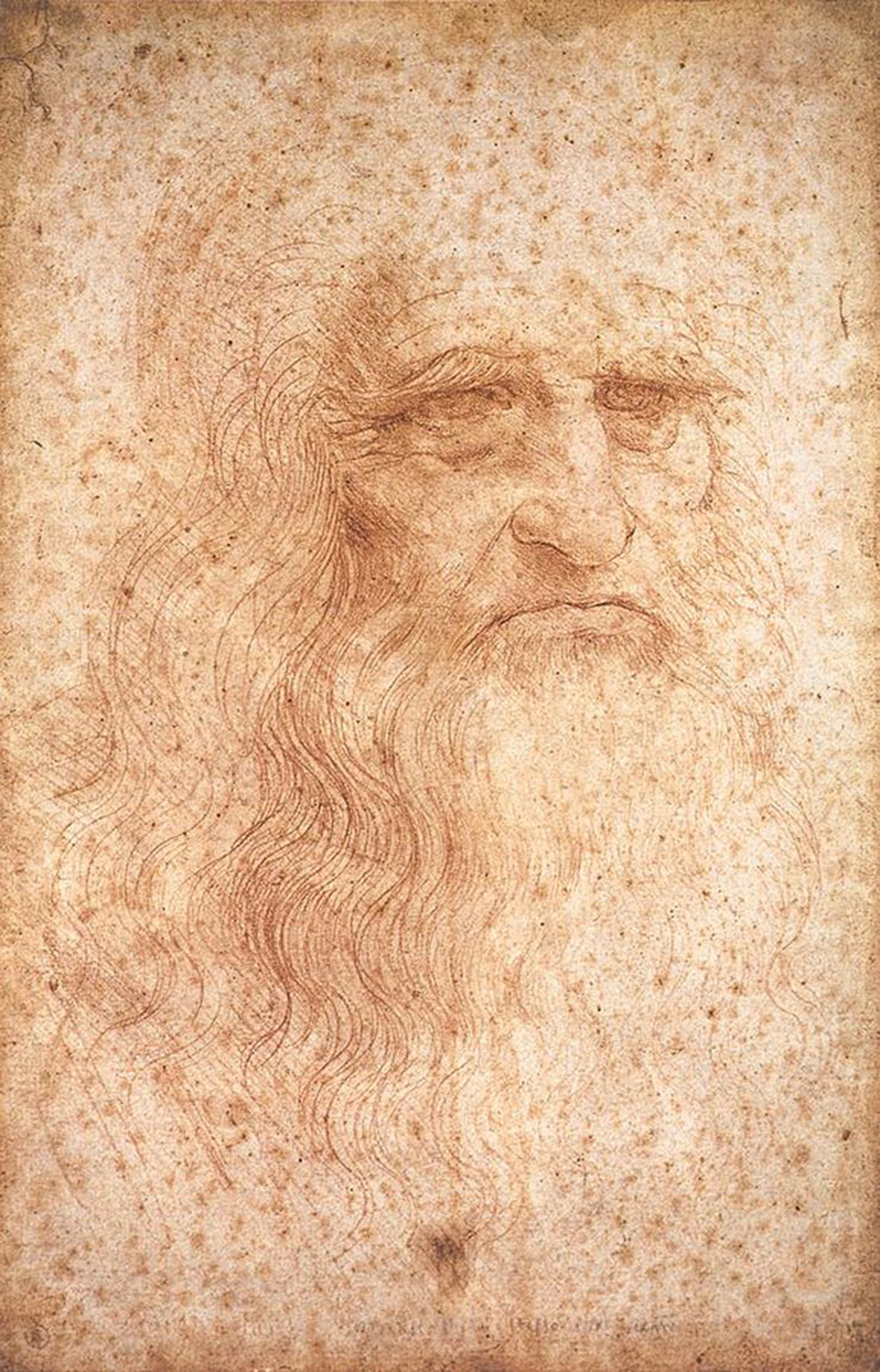
- The inscription at the bottom of the portrait, added by a later hand, reads: "Leonardo da Vinci, portrait of himself as an old man"
- Artist: Leonardo da Vinci
- Year: c. 1512
- Type: Red chalk on paper
- Dimensions: 33.3 cm × 21.6 cm (13.1 in × 8.5 in)
- Location: Royal Library, Turin

Portrait of a Man in Red Chalk (c. 1510) is a drawing currently in the collection of the Royal Library of Turin. It is widely, though not universally, accepted as a self-portrait of the Renaissance artist Leonardo da Vinci. It is thought that Leonardo drew this self-portrait at about the age of 60. The portrait has been extensively reproduced and has become an iconic representation of him as a polymath or "Renaissance man". Despite this, some historians and scholars disagree as to the true identity of the sitter.

== Description and provenance ==
The portrait is drawn in red chalk on paper. It depicts the head of an elderly man in three-quarter view, his face turned towards the viewer. The subject is distinguished by his long hair and long, waving beard, which flow over the shoulders and chest. The length of the hair and beard is uncommon in Renaissance portraits and suggests, as now, a person of sagacity. The face has a somewhat aquiline nose and is marked by deep lines on the brow and pouches below the eyes. It appears as if the man has lost his upper front teeth, causing deepening of the grooves from the nostrils. The eyes of the figure do not engage the viewer but gaze ahead, veiled by the long eyebrows. The drawing has been drawn in fine, unique lines, shadowed by hatching and executed with the left hand, as was Leonardo's habit. The paper has brownish "fox marks" caused by the accumulation of iron salts due to moisture.

In 1839, Giovanni Volpato, an antiques dealer who may have purchased the drawing in England or France, sold it to Prince Charles Albert of Sardinia with other drawings of great artists such as Raphael and Michelangelo. It is housed in Turin, at the Royal Library, and is not generally viewable by the public due to its fragility and poor condition. Researchers have developed a nondestructive way to gauge the condition of the drawing by describing and quantifying the chromophores affecting the paper. Their technique, described in Applied Physics Letters (2014), will be used to assess the rate at which the image is deteriorating and should help with planning appropriate conservation strategies.

== History and attribution ==
The drawing is estimated to have been drawn c. 1510, possibly as a self-portrait by Leonardo da Vinci. In 1839, it was acquired by King Carlo Alberto of Savoy. The assumption that the drawing is a self-portrait of Leonardo was made in the 19th century, based on the similarity of the sitter to the possible portrait of Leonardo as Plato in Raphael's The School of Athens and on the high quality of the drawing, consistent with others by Leonardo. It was also decreed to be a self-portrait based on its likeness to the frontispiece portrait of Leonardo in Vasari's second edition of The Lives of the Artists (1568). During World War II, the presumed self-portrait was temporarily moved from Turin to Rome to avoid being taken by the Nazis, becoming somewhat damaged in the process. In 2000, Frank Zöllner reflected that "This red chalk drawing has largely determined our idea of Leonardo's appearance for it was long taken to be his only authentic self-portrait."

Since the mid-to-late 20th century, the identification of the drawing as a self-portrait has been questioned. The claim that it represents Leonardo has been criticized by a number of Leonardo scholars and experts, such as Robert Payne, Martin Kemp, Pietro Marani, Carlo Pedretti, Larry J. Feinberg, and Martin Clayton. A frequent criticism made in the late 20th century is that the drawing depicts a man of a greater age than Leonardo himself achieved, as he died at the age of 67 and allegedly made the drawing between the age of 58 and 60. It has been suggested that the sitter represents Leonardo's father Piero da Vinci or his uncle Francesco, based on the fact they both had a long life and lived until the age of 80.

In the early 21st century, the presumed self-portrait of Leonardo was used to help identify the subject of a drawing by Giovanni Ambrogio Figino, believed to depict an elderly Leonardo with his right arm assuaged by cloth. This may correspond with accounts of Leonardo's right hand being paralytic late in life and the burial position of his presumed remains, which scientists hope to DNA test to determine if they are Leonardo's.

== Other portraits ==
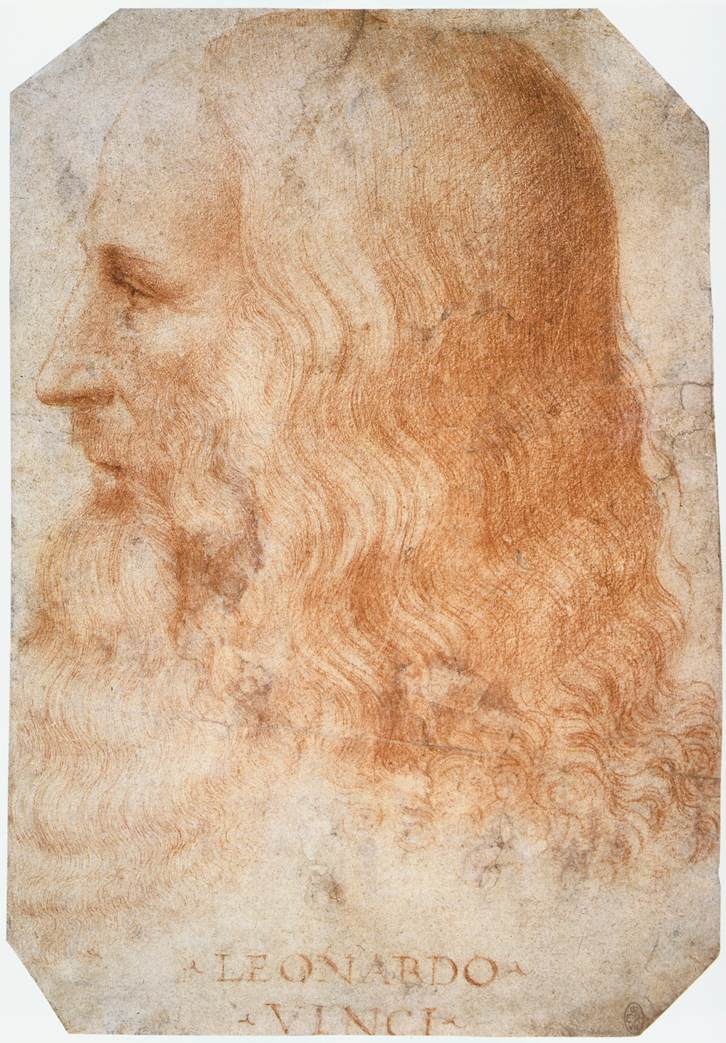
Red chalk drawing attributed to Leonardo's pupil Francesco Melzi

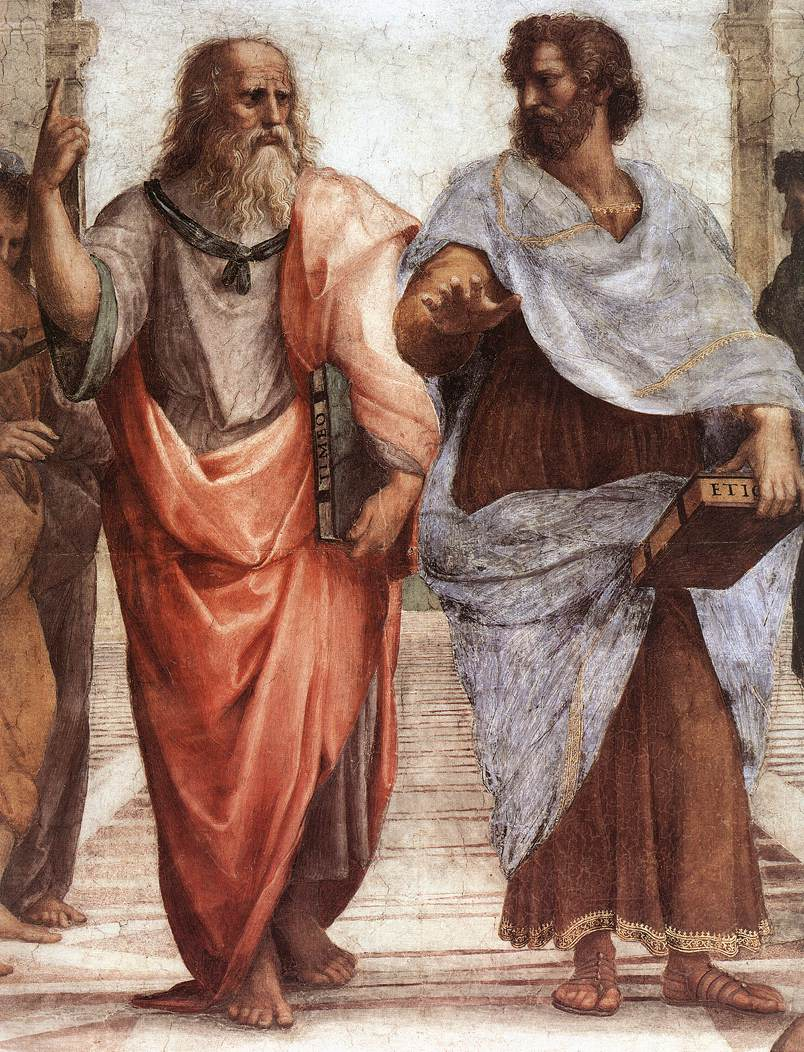
Plato in Raphael's The School of Athens

Other portraits of Leonardo by himself and other hands exist, presenting a different image of Leonardo than the man represented in the red chalk drawing. Another red chalk drawing, a profile portrait at Windsor, is attributed to his pupil Francesco Melzi. A sketch by an unknown assistant on the back of one of Leonardo's studies (c. 1517) has also been determined to be a portrait. A self-portrait from Leonardo's Codex on the Flight of Birds depicts the artist at age 53. Leonardo may have also included a self-portrait in Luca Pacioli's Divina proportione, which he illustrated. A 1471 painting of Gabriel bears an inscription indicating that it is a self-portrait of Leonardo; this would be the earliest depiction of the artist.

Leonardo is thought to be portrayed as Plato in Raphael's The School of Athens (1511). He may have been the model for two works by his master Verrocchio: the bronze statue of David (c. 1476) in the Bargello, and the archangel Raphael in Tobias and the Angel (c. 1475). Donato Bramante's Heraclitus and Democritus (1477) is thought by some to portray Leonardo as Heraclitus. (Note: By the same accounts, Bramante portrayed himself as Democritus.) Some suspect that the lower-right attendant in Leonardo's Adoration of the Magi (1481) may be a self-portrait. A 1505 engraving by Marcantonio Raimondi may portray Leonardo playing a lira da braccio, but this has yet to be verified. (Note: Leonardo was known for playing another stringed instrument, the lyre.)

There is no scholarly consensus on the attribution of the Lucan portrait to Leonardo, but it has at least on occasion been attributed to him. The engraving portrait by Raffaello Morghen and statue by Luigi Pampaloni were made after his lifetime. Romantic paintings by Jean-Auguste-Dominique Ingres, François-Guillaume Ménageot and other French artists, as well as Angelica Kauffman depict the legendary account of Leonardo's death in the hands of King Francis I of France.

== See also ==
- List of works by Leonardo da Vinci
