= 1741 Giclas =

Main-belt asteroid

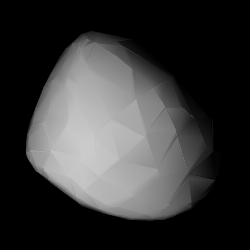
- Shape model of Giclas from its lightcurve

Discovery
- Discovered by: Indiana University (Indiana Asteroid Program)
- Discovery site: Goethe Link Obs.
- Discovery date: 26 January 1960

Designations
- Named after: Henry Giclas (astronomer)
- Alternative designations: 1960 BC · 1953 UY; 1953 VH_{1} · 1953 XN; 1963 YD
- Minor planet category: main-belt · Koronis

Orbital characteristics
- Epoch 4 September 2017 (JD 2458000.5)
- Uncertainty parameter 0
- Observation arc: 63.20 yr (23,084 days)
- Aphelion: 3.0879 AU
- Perihelion: 2.6812 AU
- Semi-major axis: 2.8846 AU
- Eccentricity: 0.0705
- Orbital period (sidereal): 4.90 yr (1,789 days)
- Mean anomaly: 17.734°
- Mean motion: 0° 12^{m} 4.32^{s} / day
- Inclination: 2.8876°
- Longitude of ascending node: 55.514°
- Argument of perihelion: 338.82°

Physical characteristics
- Dimensions: 12.501±0.245 km 13.11±0.18 km 13.60 km (calculated); 15.06±1.04 km
- Synodic rotation period: 2.92±0.02 h 2.938±0.001 h (Note: Lightcurve plot of 1741 Giclas taken at the Palmer Divide Observatory by B. D. Warner (2007)); 2.943±0.001 h 3.107±0.005 h
- Geometric albedo: 0.24 (assumed); 0.260±0.049; 0.265±0.039; 0.374±0.048; 0.3742±0.0483
- Spectral type: S V–R = 0.456±0.015
- Absolute magnitude (H): 11.11±0.04 (R) · 11.2 · 11.36±0.13 · 11.49 · 11.5

1741 Giclas (prov. designation: 1960 BC) is a stony Koronis asteroid from the outer region of the asteroid belt, approximately 13 kilometers in diameter. It was discovered on 26 January 1960, by IU's Indiana Asteroid Program at Goethe Link Observatory near Brooklyn, Indiana, United States. It is named for astronomer Henry L. Giclas.

== Orbit and classification ==
The S-type asteroid is a member of the Koronis family, a group consisting of about 200 known bodies. It orbits the Sun in the outer main-belt at a distance of 2.7–3.1 AU once every 4 years and 11 months (1,789 days). Its orbit has an eccentricity of 0.07 and an inclination of 3° with respect to the ecliptic. Its first used observation was taken at Goethe Link Observatory in 1953, extending the body's observation arc by 7 years prior to its official discovery observation.

== Physical characteristics ==
=== Rotation period ===
Between 2004 and 2014, several lightcurves of Giclas gave a rotation period between 2.92 and 3.107 hours with an brightness variation between 0.10 and 0.15 magnitude (U=3-/3/3/2).

=== Diameter and albedo ===
According to the surveys carried out by the Japanese Akari satellite and NASA's Wide-field Infrared Survey Explorer with its subsequent NEOWISE mission, Giclas measures 12.50 and 15.06 kilometers in diameter, and its surface has an albedo in the range of 0.260 to 0.374.

The Collaborative Asteroid Lightcurve Link assumes an albedo of 0.24 and calculates a diameter of 13.60 kilometers with an absolute magnitude of 11.5.

== Naming ==
This minor planet was named in honour of American astronomer Henry Lee Giclas (1910–2007), longtime staff member of the Lowell Observatory in Flagstaff, Arizona, where he discovered 17 minor planets and the comet 84P/Giclas. Giclas responsibility included the programs of minor planet positions and stellar proper motions, using the 13-inch Lawrence Lowell Telescope. The official naming citation was published by the Minor Planet Center on 20 February 1976 (M.P.C. 3934).
