= 93P/Lovas =

Periodic comet with a nine-year orbit

Discovery
- Discovered by: Miklós Lovas
- Discovery date: 5 December 1980

Designations
- MPC designation: P/1980 X1; P/1989 N2
- Alternative designations: Lovas 1; 1980 V, 1989 XIII; 1980s, 1989p

Orbital characteristics
- Epoch: 30 April 2026
- Observation arc: 45 years
- Number of observations: 3618
- Aphelion: 7.06 AU
- Perihelion: 1.69 AU
- Semi-major axis: 4.37 AU
- Eccentricity: 0.6138
- Orbital period: 9.14 years
- Inclination: 12.210
- Last perihelion: 2 May 2026; 1 March 2017
- Next perihelion: 6 May 2035
- T_{Jupiter}: 2.605
- Earth MOID: 0.758 AU (113.4 million km)
- Jupiter MOID: 0.815 AU (121.9 million km)

Physical characteristics
- Mean radius: 2.59±0.26 km
- Synodic rotation period: 13.2–18.2 hours
- Comet total magnitude (M1): 12.1
- Comet nuclear magnitude (M2): 14.6

93P/Lovas, also called Comet Lovas 1, is a Jupiter-family comet roughly 5 km in diameter with an orbital period of 9.1 years. It was discovered in 1980 by Hungarian astronomer Miklós Lovas. The current orbit does not bring it closer than about 0.76 AU (114 million km) from Earth. It came to perihelion on 2 May 2026 and will next come to perihelion on 6 May 2035.

== Observational history ==
Miklos Lovas discovered the comet in photographic plates exposed on 5 December 1980. He estimated the comet had an apparent magnitude of 17. Although the discovery was announced on 8 December, on 15 December the International Astronomical Union Circular announced that no confirmation of the comet had been reported. Charles T. Kowal discovered the comet independently on 14 December. The low number of available observations meant that a preliminary orbit was difficult to calculate and the orbit of the comet was reliably computed in February 1981.

The comet was recovered on 7 July 1989 by Tsutomu Seki. He described it as diffuse with central concentration and with an apparent magnitude of 17.5. He also found it in plates exposed on 5 and 13 July. Few observations were recorded in August and September, including a visual observation by David H. Levy, who estimated an apparent magnitude of 16.3 on 24 August using an 154 cm reflector telescope. The comet passed perihelion on 10.5 October 1989. The comet brightened in November, with Alan Hale reporting magnitudes around 13 throughout the month. The comet approached Earth to a distance of 0.892 AU on 11 December 1989. The comet was then around 13 to 14 magnitude and its coma was 0.7 arcminutes across. It was last seen on 24 January 1990.

During its next apparition it was recovered in June 1998 17.44 at Whipple Observatory. The comet brightened to 13th magnitude in late 1989 to early 1990.

== Scientific results ==
The comet was observed by the Spitzer Space Telescope in infrared during the 2009 apparition. Based on these observations the effective radius of the nucleus was estimated to be 2.59±0.26 km. During the same apparition the rotational period was estimated, with the most possible values being 18.2 and 13.2 hours.

Numbered comets
Previous; 92P/Sanguin	93P/Lovas	Next; 94P/Russell
