= Royal Library of Turin =

Library in Turin, Italy

Coordinates: 45°04′19.8″N 7°41′07.8″E

Royal Library
- Biblioteca Reale
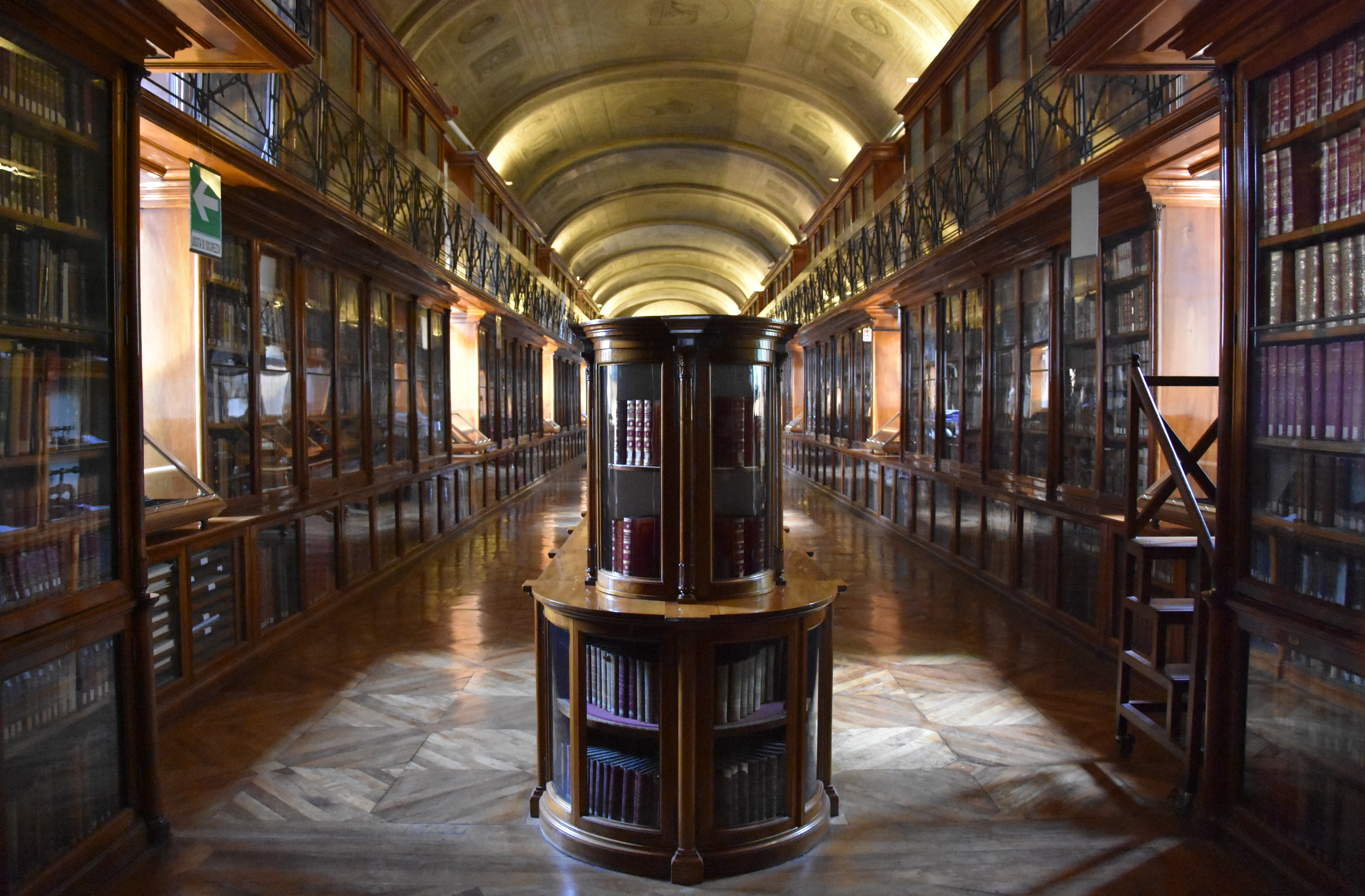
- Interior of the Royal Library of Turin
- Location: Turin, Italy
- Established: 1842

Collection
- Size: 250,000 item (2019), 4,500 item (2019), 342,000 item (2022), 5,500 item (2022), 320,000 volume, 186 item, 300,000 item (2020), 300,000 item (2021)

Other information
- Website: Official website

The Royal Library of Turin (Italian: Biblioteca Reale di Torino) is a library located within the ground floor of the Royal Palace of Turin, itself a World Heritage Site in Turin, Italy.

The library contains approximately 200,000 print volumes, 4,500 manuscripts, 3,055 drawings, 187 incunabula predating 1501, 5,019 sixteenth century books, 20,987 pamphlets, 1,500 works on parchment, 1,112 periodicals, and 400 photo albums, maps, engravings, and prints.

== History ==
Since his ascent to the throne of the Kingdom of Sardinia in 1831, king Charles Albert wished to boost the cultural standing of the nation, and he did so through the introduction of a series of reforms and the establishment of a number of institutions. The library was then founded in 1842 as one of such institutions, with one of its aims being that of grouping and safeguarding manuscripts collected by the House of Savoy. The library was fitted out by painter and decorator Pelagio Palagi. In 1893 a Russian collector by the name of Theodore Sabachnikoff donated Leonardo da Vinci's Codex on the Flight of Birds to the library's collection as a gift to the king. Further works by Leonardo held by the library include his presumed self-portrait, his study for the angel in his Virgin of the Rocks, and his study for the angel in Verrocchio's The Baptism of Christ.

In 1998, an underground exhibition room was crafted to safely display the collection to the public with the most up-to-date museum technologies.

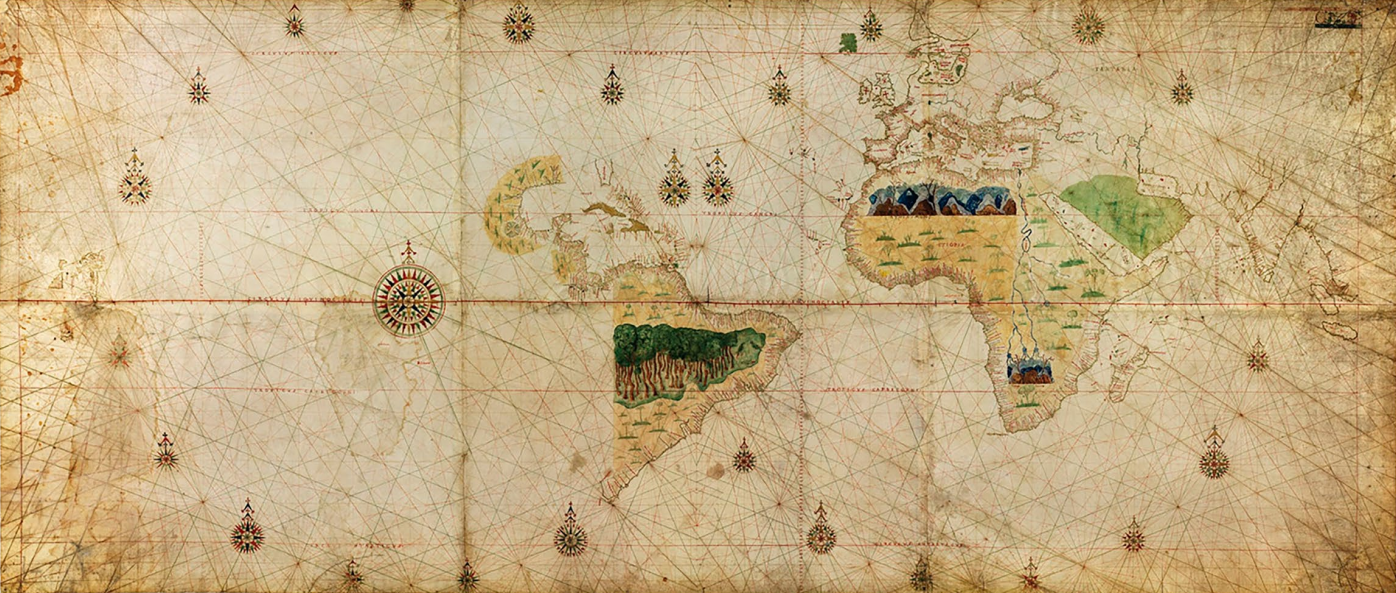
The Geocarta Nautica Universale (1523), the first known map to show the discoveries of the Magellan Expedition

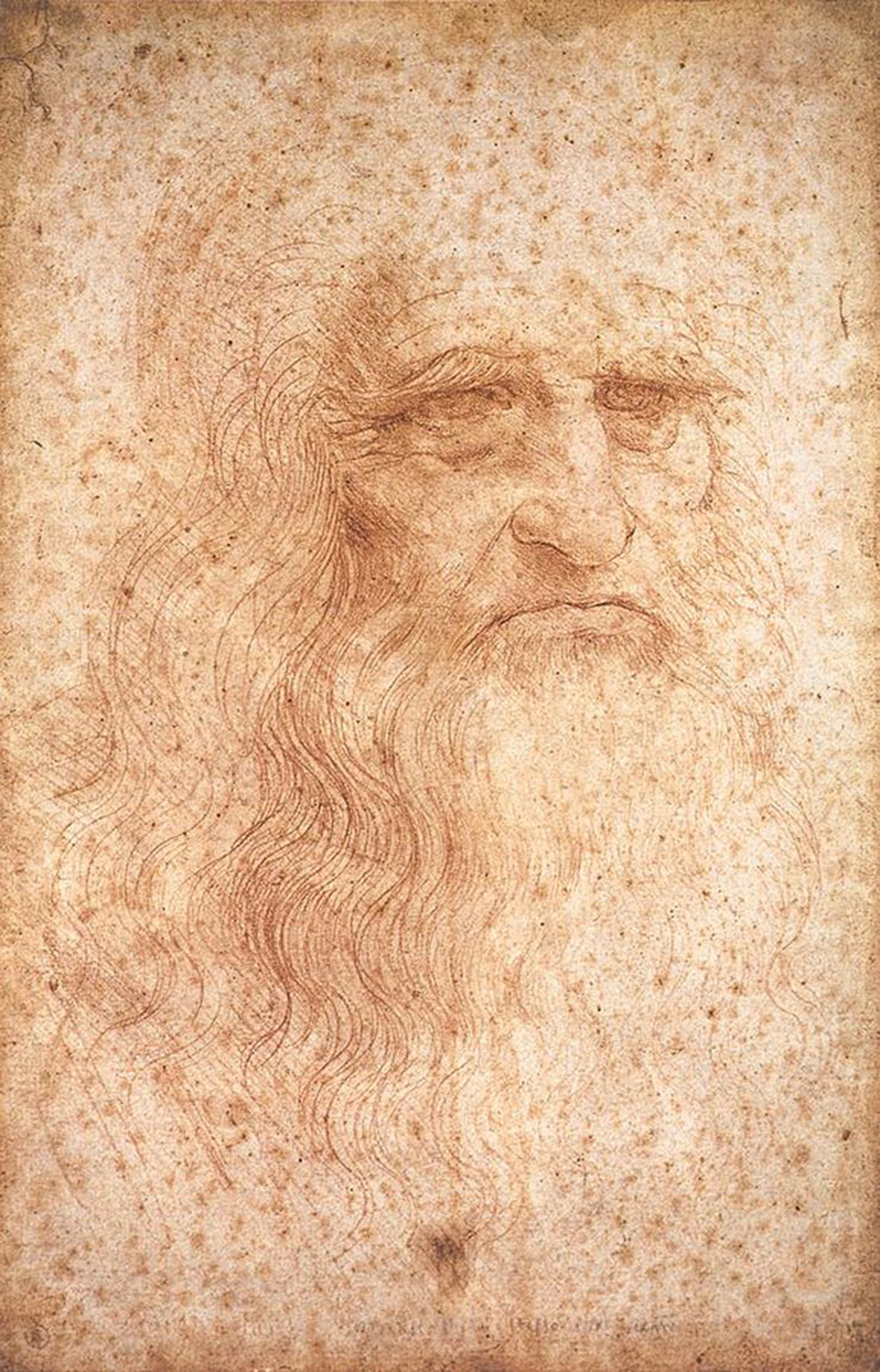
The presumed self-portrait of Leonardo da Vinci held by the Royal Library

== See also ==
- Head of a Woman (Leonardo, Turin)
