= Head of a Woman (Leonardo, Turin) =

Drawing by Leonardo da Vinci

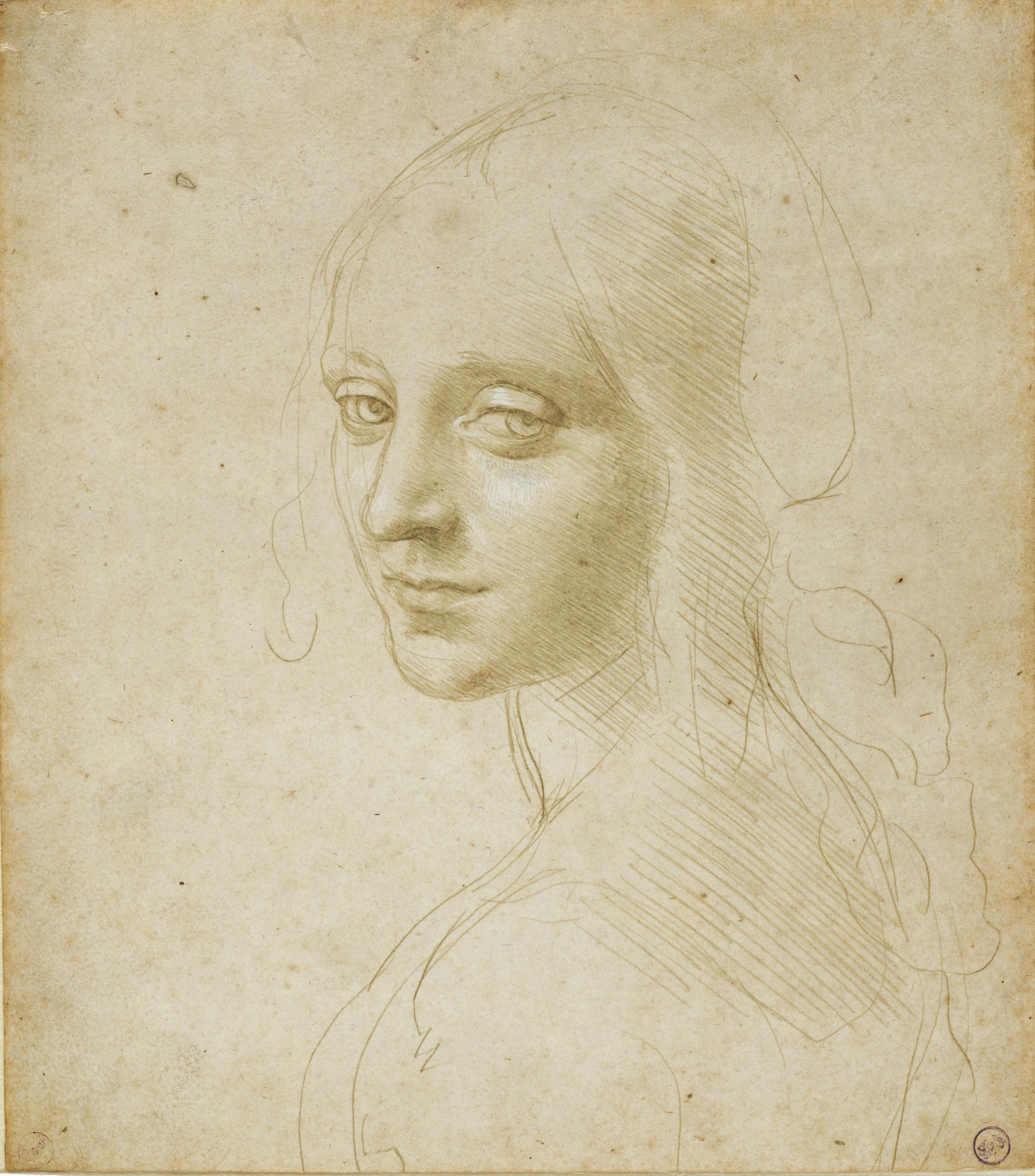
- Artist: Leonardo da Vinci
- Year: c. 1483–1485
- Medium: Silverpoint
- Dimensions: 18.1 cm × 15.9 cm (7.1 in × 6.3 in)
- Location: Royal Library of Turin

The Head of a Young Woman is a drawing in silverpoint on paper by the Florentine painter Leonardo da Vinci, housed in the Royal Library of Turin.

== See also ==
- List of works by Leonardo da Vinci
