= Henry L. Giclas =

American astronomer (1910–2007)

Henry Lee Giclas
- Born: December 9, 1910; Flagstaff, Arizona, U.S.
- Died: April 2, 2007 (aged 96); Flagstaff, Arizona, U.S.
- Occupation: Astronomer

Asteroids discovered: 17
| 1886 Lowell | June 21, 1949 |
| 2061 Anza | October 22, 1960 |
| 2118 Flagstaff | August 5, 1978 |
| 2201 Oljato | December 12, 1947 |
| 2313 Aruna | October 15, 1976 |
| 2347 Vinata | October 7, 1936 |
| 2415 Ganesa | October 28, 1978 |
| 3110 Wagman | September 28, 1975 |
| 3177 Chillicothe | January 8, 1934 |
| 3382 Cassidy | September 7, 1948 |
| 3487 Edgeworth | October 28, 1978 |
| 3695 Fiala | October 21, 1973 |
| 6277 Siok ^{[A]} | August 24, 1949 |
| (7731) 1978 UV | October 28, 1978 |
| (10451) 1975 SE | September 28, 1975 |
| (15204) 1978 UG | October 28, 1978 |
| (17353) 1975 TE | October 10, 1975 |
^{A} co-discovered with Robert D. Schaldach

Henry Lee Giclas (December 9, 1910 – April 2, 2007) was an American astronomer and a discoverer of minor planets and comets working at Lowell Observatory. He is best known his proper motion survey, with several relatively nearby stars bearing his name such as Giclas 99-49.

Henry Giclas is credited by the Minor Planet Center with the discovery of 17 numbered minor planets between 1943 and 1978, including 2201 Oljato – tentatively identified as the parent body of the "Chi Orionids" meteor shower – and 2061 Anza, two near-Earth asteroids of the Apollo and Amor group, respectively.

He also discovered 84P/Giclas in 1978, a periodic comet of the Jupiter family.

Henry Giclas died of a stroke at the age of 96 in Flagstaff, Arizona. The crater Giclas on Pluto, as well as the asteroid 1741 Giclas, discovered by the Indiana Asteroid Program in 1960, are named for him.
