= 84P/Giclas =

Jupiter-family comet

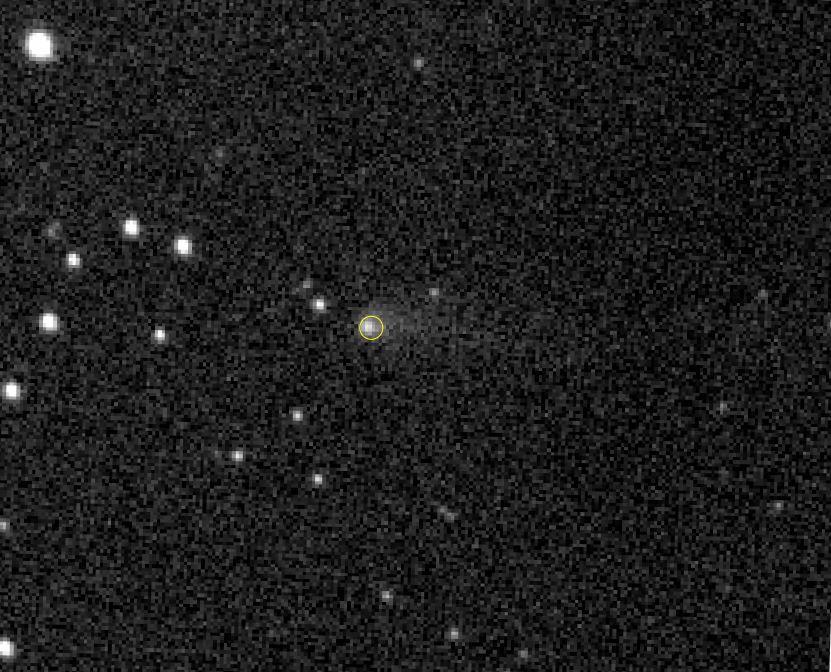
- Comet Giclas photographed from the Zwicky Transient Facility on 14 August 2020

Discovery
- Discovered by: Henry L. Giclas
- Discovery site: Lowell Observatory, USA
- Discovery date: 8 September 1978

Designations
- MPC designation: D/1931 R1, P/1978 R2; P/1985 M1
- Alternative designations: 1978 XXII, 1985 XV; 1992 XXV, 1978k, 1985g; 1992l

Orbital characteristics
- Epoch: 21 November 2025 (JD 2461000.5)
- Observation arc: 89.43 years
- Earliest precovery date: 12 September 1931
- Number of observations: 1,792
- Aphelion: 5.381 AU
- Perihelion: 1.719 AU
- Semi-major axis: 3.550 AU
- Eccentricity: 0.51562
- Orbital period: 6.689 years
- Inclination: 7.553°
- Longitude of ascending node: 108.08°
- Argument of periapsis: 281.74°
- Mean anomaly: 293.89°
- Last perihelion: 3 June 2020
- Next perihelion: 12 February 2027
- T_{Jupiter}: 2.872
- Earth MOID: 0.862 AU
- Jupiter MOID: 0.555 AU

Physical characteristics
- Mean radius: 0.90 ± 0.05 km (0.559 ± 0.031 mi)
- Mean density: 500±70 kg/m^{3}
- Geometric albedo: 0.04 (assumed)
- Spectral type: (V–R) = 0.32±0.03
- Comet total magnitude (M1): 14.2

84P/Giclas is a Jupiter-family comet with a 6.69-year orbit around the Sun. It is the only comet discovered by American astronomer, Henry L. Giclas.

== Observational history ==
=== 1931 apparition ===
It was announced in 1995 that Clyde W. Tombaugh had observed a previously unknown comet for three nights in September 1931. Designated as D/1931 R1, it was later confirmed to be an earlier apparition of 84P/Giclas upon reconstructing its orbit using non-gravitational accelerations in a 1996 study by Grzegorz Sitarski.

=== 1979 apparition ===
The comet was discovered by Henry L. Giclas from the Lowell Observatory on 8 September 1978. At the time it was a diffuse 15th-magnitude object within the constellation Cetus. (Note: Reported initial position upon discovery was: α = 0^{h} 08^{m} 14^{s}, δ = –8° 59′ 48″) He confirmed his discovery about two days later, where Brian G. Marsden soon determined that it follows a 6.74-year periodic orbit around the Sun. Throughout its 1978–1979 apparition, it remained mostly a photographic object.

=== Follow-up observations ===
During the 2020 apparition, it was not more than 60 degrees from the Sun until September 2020. On 11 June 2033, the comet will pass 0.0387 AU (5.79 million km; 3.60 million mi) from the asteroid 4 Vesta.

== Physical characteristics ==
Based on observations by the Hubble Space Telescope in 1999–2000, the nucleus of the comet has a radius of 0.90±0.05 km, assuming a geometric albedo of 0.04.

== Notes ==
Numbered comets
Previous; 83D/Russell	84P/Giclas	Next; 85D/Boethin
