= C/1989 Y2 (McKenzie–Russell) =

Hyperbolic comet

Discovery
- Discovered by: Patricia McKenzie; Kenneth S. Russell
- Discovery site: Anglo-Australian Observatory
- Discovery date: 21 December 1989

Designations
- Alternative designations: 1989f1 1989 XVIII

Orbital characteristics
- Epoch: 30 December 1989 (JD 2447890.5)
- Observation arc: 50 days
- Earliest precovery date: 19 December 1989
- Number of observations: 45
- Perihelion: 1.976 AU
- Eccentricity: 0.99999
- Inclination: 160.366°
- Longitude of ascending node: 293.896°
- Argument of periapsis: 191.736°
- Last perihelion: 7 November 1989
- T_{Jupiter}: –1.641
- Earth MOID: 0.9962 AU
- Jupiter MOID: 1.4407 AU
- Comet total magnitude (M1): 10.0

Comet McKenzie–Russell, formally designated as C/1989 Y2, is a hyperbolic comet that was discovered by Australian astronomers, Patricia McKenzie and Kenneth S. Russell on December 1989.

== Discovery and observations ==
Robert H. McNaught reported the discovery of a new comet that Patricia McKenzie found on photographic plates that Kenneth S. Russell took on 21 December 1989. Prediscovery images from Japan were taken in 19 December 1989 but went unnoticed until the next year. Orbital calculations of the comet revealed it was already on its outbound flight as it had reached perihelion a month before discovery, and as a result it continued to fade away in the following days. It was last observed on 24 January 1990.
