= 92P/Sanguin =

Periodic comet

Discovery
- Discovered by: Juan G. Sanguin
- Discovery site: Leoncito, Argentina
- Discovery date: 15 October 1977

Designations
- MPC designation: P/1977 T2; P/1989 J1
- Alternative designations: 1977 XII, 1990 IV; 1977p, 1989z

Orbital characteristics
- Epoch: 27 February 2015 (JD 2457080.5)
- Observation arc: 38.33 years
- Earliest precovery date: 13 September 1977
- Number of observations: 1,001
- Aphelion: 8.897 AU
- Perihelion: 1.826 AU
- Semi-major axis: 5.361 AU
- Eccentricity: 0.65949
- Orbital period: 12.413 years
- Inclination: 19.444°
- Longitude of ascending node: 181.46°
- Argument of periapsis: 163.80°
- Mean anomaly: 359.82°
- Last perihelion: 1 March 2015
- Next perihelion: 15 July 2027
- T_{Jupiter}: 2.410
- Earth MOID: 0.826 AU
- Jupiter MOID: 0.807 AU

Physical characteristics
- Mean diameter: 2.38 km (1.48 mi)
- Mean density: 0.49±0.06 g/cm^{3}
- Synodic rotation period: 6.22±0.05 hours
- Geometric albedo: 0.04 (assumed)
- Comet total magnitude (M1): 11.1
- Comet nuclear magnitude (M2): 14.5

92P/Sanguin, also called Sanguin's Comet or Comet Sanguin, is a Jupiter-family comet discovered on 15 October 1977, by Juan G. Sanguin at Leoncito Astronomical Complex.

== Physical characteristics ==
Initial estimates suggest that the comet completes a single rotation approximately once every 6 days, however this was revised to just only 6.2 hours.

The nucleus of the comet has a radius of about 1.19 km (0.74 mi) based on observations by the Keck Observatory, assuming a geometric albedo of 0.04.

Numbered comets
Previous; 91P/Russell	92P/Sanguin	Next; 93P/Lovas
