= Juan G. Sanguin =

Argentine astronomer (1933–2006)

- Born: 1933
- Died: January 7, 2006 (aged 72–73)
- Scientific career
- Fields: Astronomy
- Institutions: "El Leoncito" Astronomical Complex

Juan G. Sanguin (1933 – 7 January 2006) was an Argentine astronomer.

Sanguin guided the studies about Small Solar System bodies at the "El Leoncito" Astronomical Complex (Complejo Astronómico El Leoncito, CASLEO) for more than 25 years. He had collaborated with Carlos Cesco.

He is known for the discovery of periodic comet 92P/Sanguin, on October 15, 1977, at the "El Leoncito" Astronomical Complex.

The asteroid 5081 Sanguin brings his name.
