= 90P/Gehrels =

Jupiter-family comet

Discovery
- Discovered by: Tom Gehrels
- Discovery date: 11 October 1972

Designations
- MPC designation: P/1972 T1; P/1987 Q2
- Alternative designations: Gehrels 1; 1973 I, 1987 XVI; 1972k, 1987v

Orbital characteristics
- Epoch: 21 November 2025 (JD 2461000.5)
- Observation arc: 45.51 years (Note: Observation arc from the Minor Planet Center database covering dates from 11 October 1972 until 15 April 2018.)
- Number of observations: 621
- Aphelion: 9.15 AU
- Perihelion: 2.965 AU
- Semi-major axis: 6.055 AU
- Eccentricity: 0.5103
- Orbital period: 14.9 yr
- Inclination: 9.635°
- Last perihelion: 19 June 2017
- Next perihelion: 20 May 2032

Physical characteristics
- Mean radius: 2.64 km (1.64 mi)
- Comet total magnitude (M1): 7.0

90P/Gehrels, also known as Gehrels 1, is a Jupiter-family comet with a 14.9 year orbital period around the Sun. Its nucleus is about 5.28 km (3.28 mi) in diameter. It last came to perihelion in 2017 and will next come to perihelion in 2032.

== Notes ==
Numbered comets
Previous; 89P/Russell	90P/Gehrels	Next; 91P/Russell
