= 2061 Anza =

Eccentric asteroid of the Amor group

Discovery
- Discovered by: H. L. Giclas
- Discovery site: Flagstaff (LO)
- Discovery date: 22 October 1960

Designations
- Named after: Juan Bautista de Anza (Governor of Nuevo México)
- Alternative designations: 1960 UA
- Minor planet category: Amor · NEO; Mars-crosser

Orbital characteristics
- Epoch 4 September 2017 (JD 2458000.5)
- Uncertainty parameter 0
- Observation arc: 56.56 yr (20,659 days)
- Aphelion: 3.4824 AU
- Perihelion: 1.0527 AU
- Semi-major axis: 2.2675 AU
- Eccentricity: 0.5358
- Orbital period (sidereal): 3.41 yr (1,247 days)
- Mean anomaly: 251.57°
- Mean motion: 0° 17^{m} 19.32^{s} / day
- Inclination: 3.7970°
- Longitude of ascending node: 207.41°
- Argument of perihelion: 156.95°
- Earth MOID: 0.0570 AU · 22.2 LD

Physical characteristics
- Dimensions: 2.6 km 2.71 km (calculated)
- Synodic rotation period: 11.50 h
- Geometric albedo: 0.057 (assumed)
- Spectral type: Tholen = TCG: B–V = 0.825; U–B = 0.350
- Absolute magnitude (H): 16.56

2061 Anza, provisional designation 1960 UA, is an eccentric asteroid of the Amor group, a subtype of near-Earth objects, estimated to measure approximately 2.7 kilometers in diameter. It was discovered on 22 October 1960, by American astronomer Henry Giclas at Lowell's Flagstaff Observatory in Arizona, United States. The asteroid was later named after Spanish explorer Juan Bautista de Anza.

== Classification and orbit ==
Anza is an Amor asteroid – a subgroup of near-Earth asteroids that approach the orbit of Earth from beyond, but do not cross it. Orbiting the Sun at a distance of 1.1–3.5 AU once every 3 years and 5 months (1,247 days), its orbit has an eccentricity of 0.54 and an inclination of 4° with respect to the ecliptic. Due to its high eccentricity, Anza is also classified as a Mars-crosser. The body's observation arc begins with its official discovery observation.

=== Close approaches ===
The asteroid has an Earth minimum orbit intersection distance (MOID) of 0.0570 AU (8,530,000 km) which correspond to 22.2 lunar distances. On 7 October 1960, it passed Earth at 0.0634 AU (9,480,000 km) and was tracked for a period of 3.5 months to determine a better orbit. It was not observed again until its next near-Earth approach of 1977.

== Physical characteristics ==
In the Tholen classification, Anza has a rare TCG: spectral type.

=== Lightcurves ===
In the 1960s, a rotational lightcurve of Anza was obtained from photometric observations taken at the discovering observatory by Austrian astronomer Karl Rakos from Graz University Observatory (580). Lightcurve analysis gave a rotation period of 11.50 hours with a brightness amplitude of 0.3 magnitude (U=2). No additional lightcurves have been obtained since.

=== Diameter and albedo ===
According to Tom Gehrels publication in his book Hazards Due to Comets and Asteroids, Anza measures 2.6 kilometers in diameter, while the Collaborative Asteroid Lightcurve Link assumes a standard albedo for carbonaceous asteroids of 0.057 and calculates a diameter of 2.71 kilometers based on an absolute magnitude of 16.56.

== Naming ==
This minor planet was named after Juan Bautista de Anza (1736–1788), Spanish explorer and Governor of Santa Fe de Nuevo México for the Spanish Empire in the 18th century, now the U.S state of New Mexico. He was born in Tucson, Arizona, then New Spain, and became the commander at the Spanish fortification Presidio San Ignacio de Tubac before he explored the first overland route from southern Arizona to California (Monterey).

The official naming citation was published by the Minor Planet Center on 1 August 1978 (M.P.C. 4420).
