= Red chalk =

Drawing material

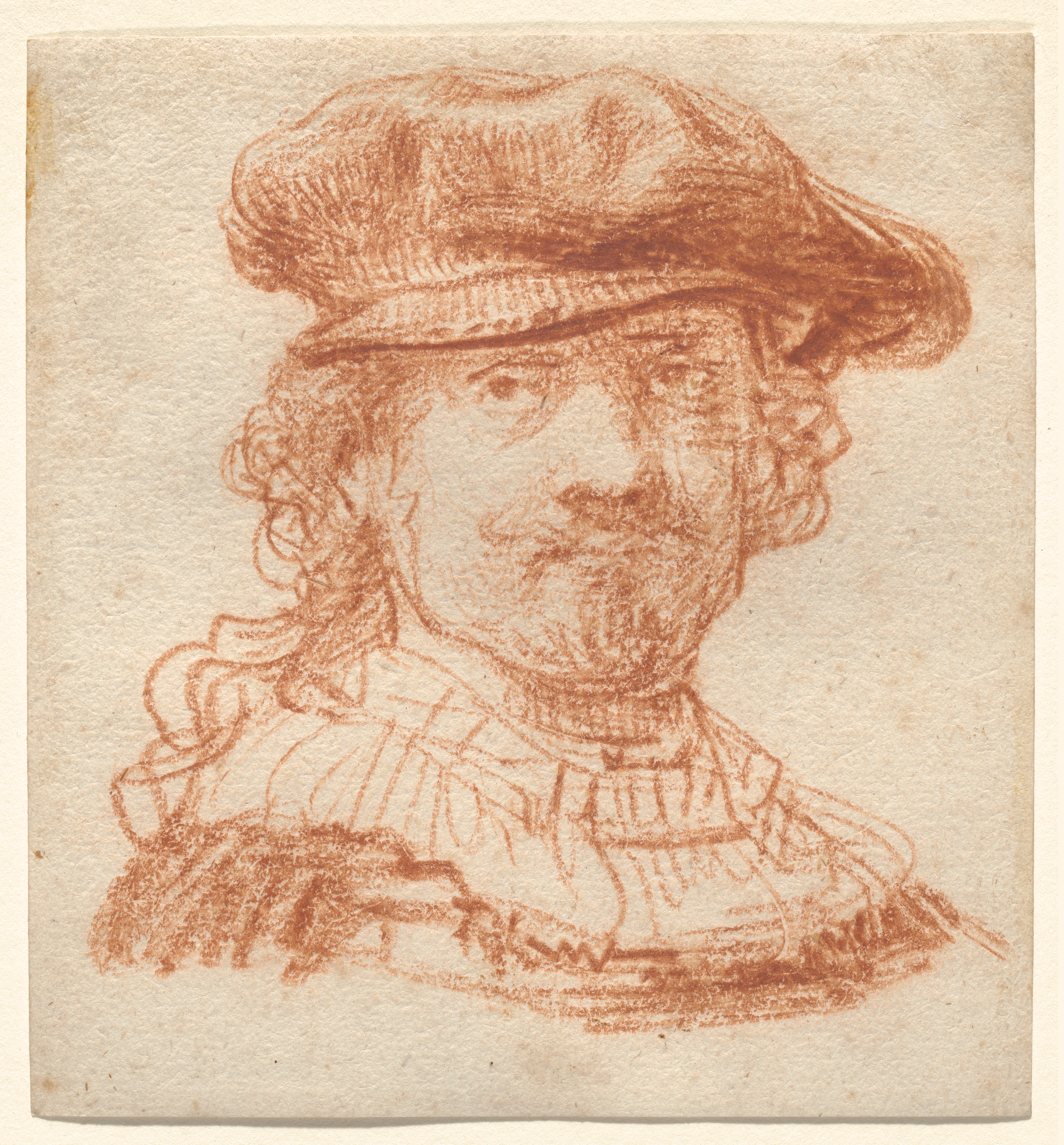
Rembrandt, Self-portrait in red chalk, c. 1637. National Gallery of Art, Washington, D.C.

Red chalk is chalk of a reddish-brown color, which was used as a material for drawing. It is obtained from the red ochre variety of hematite. Another term for red chalk, common in older references, is sanguine (/ˈsæŋɡwɪn/). The word comes via French from the Italian sanguigna and is originally from the Latin "sanguis"; it refers to the color's similarity to that of dried blood.

Red chalk was used by the ancient Egyptians and ancient Romans for wall painting. By the 16th century deposits were known in Italy, Spain, Flanders, France, and Germany, and the material became a popular medium for drawing. Leonardo da Vinci, in the late 15th century, was the first major artist to work in the medium.

== Technique ==
Red chalk lends itself naturally to sketches, life drawings, and rustic scenes. It is ideal for rendering modeling and volume, and human flesh. In the form of wood-cased pencils and manufactured sticks, it may be used similarly to charcoal and pastel. As with pastel, a mid-toned paper may be put to good use. A fixative may be applied to preserve the finished state of the drawing. The pigment used in red chalk sticks comes from red earths such as red ochre. Sanguines are also available in several other tones such as orange, tan, brown, beige.

== Gallery ==
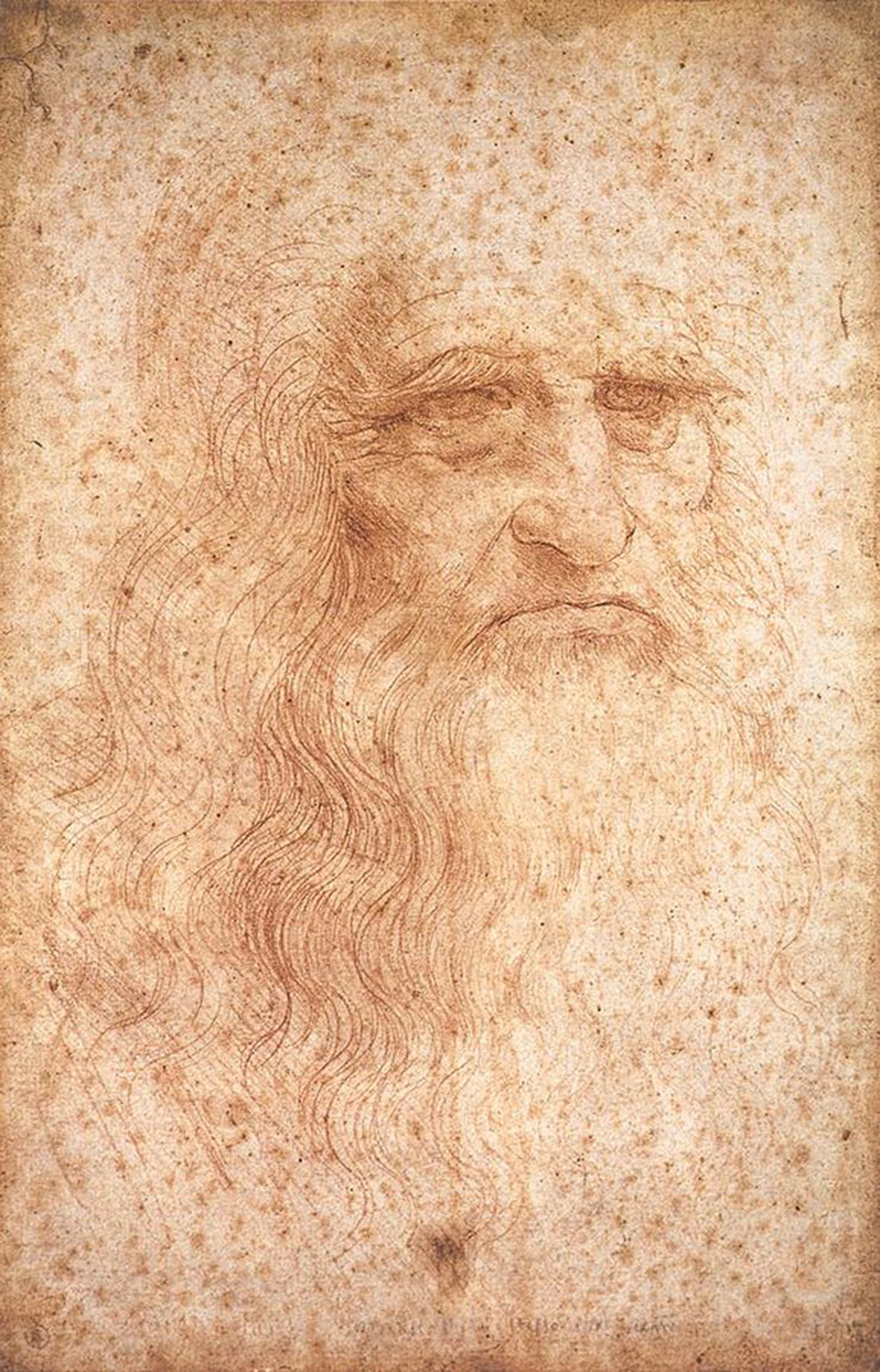
Leonardo da Vinci, Supposed self-portrait in red chalk, c. 1512

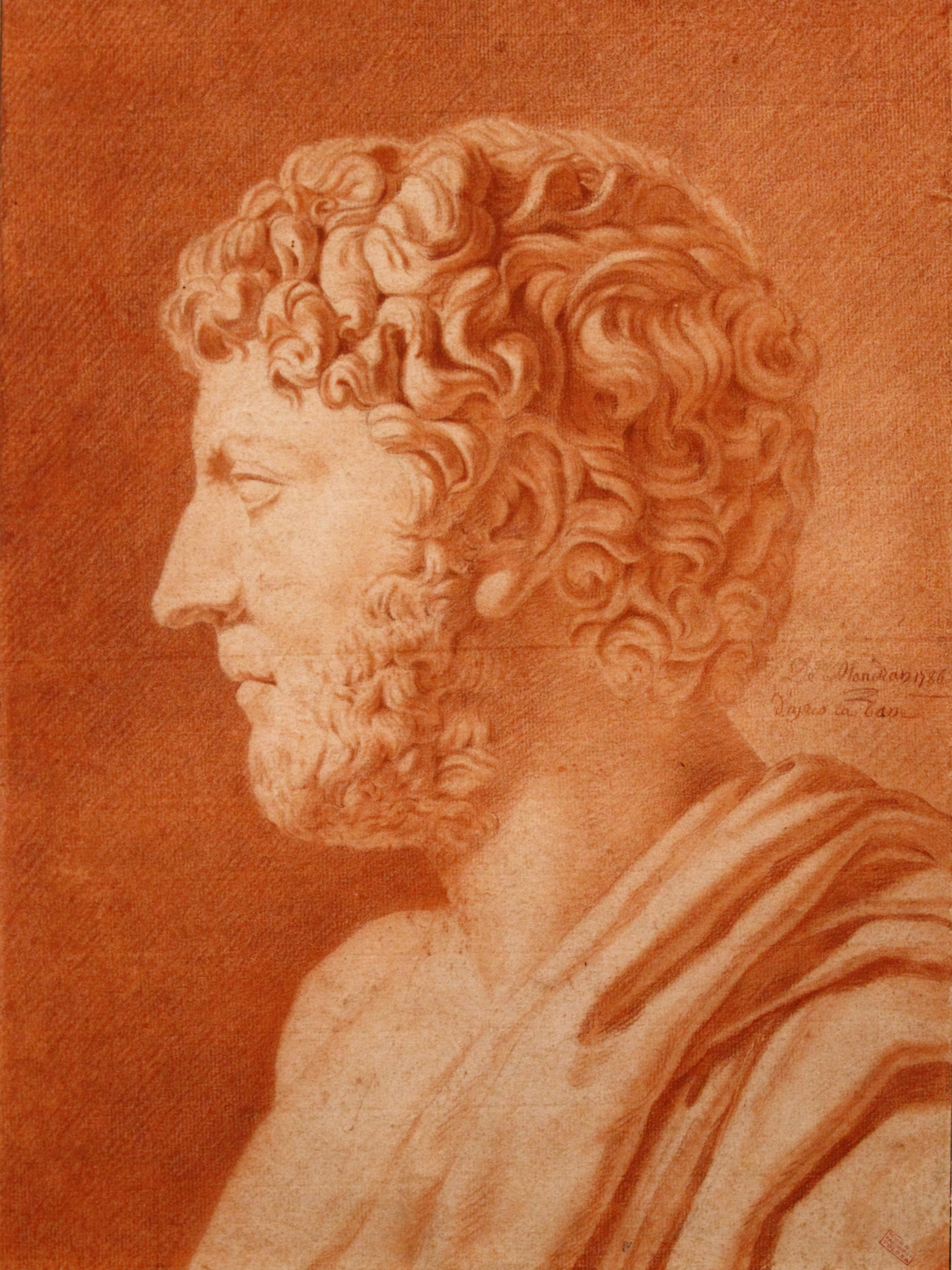
Mademoiselle de Mondran, Study after a Roman bust, 1786; relatively unusual in fully coloring the background

== See also ==
- Conté
- Trois crayons
