= Codex on the Flight of Birds =

Manuscript book by Leonardo da Vinci

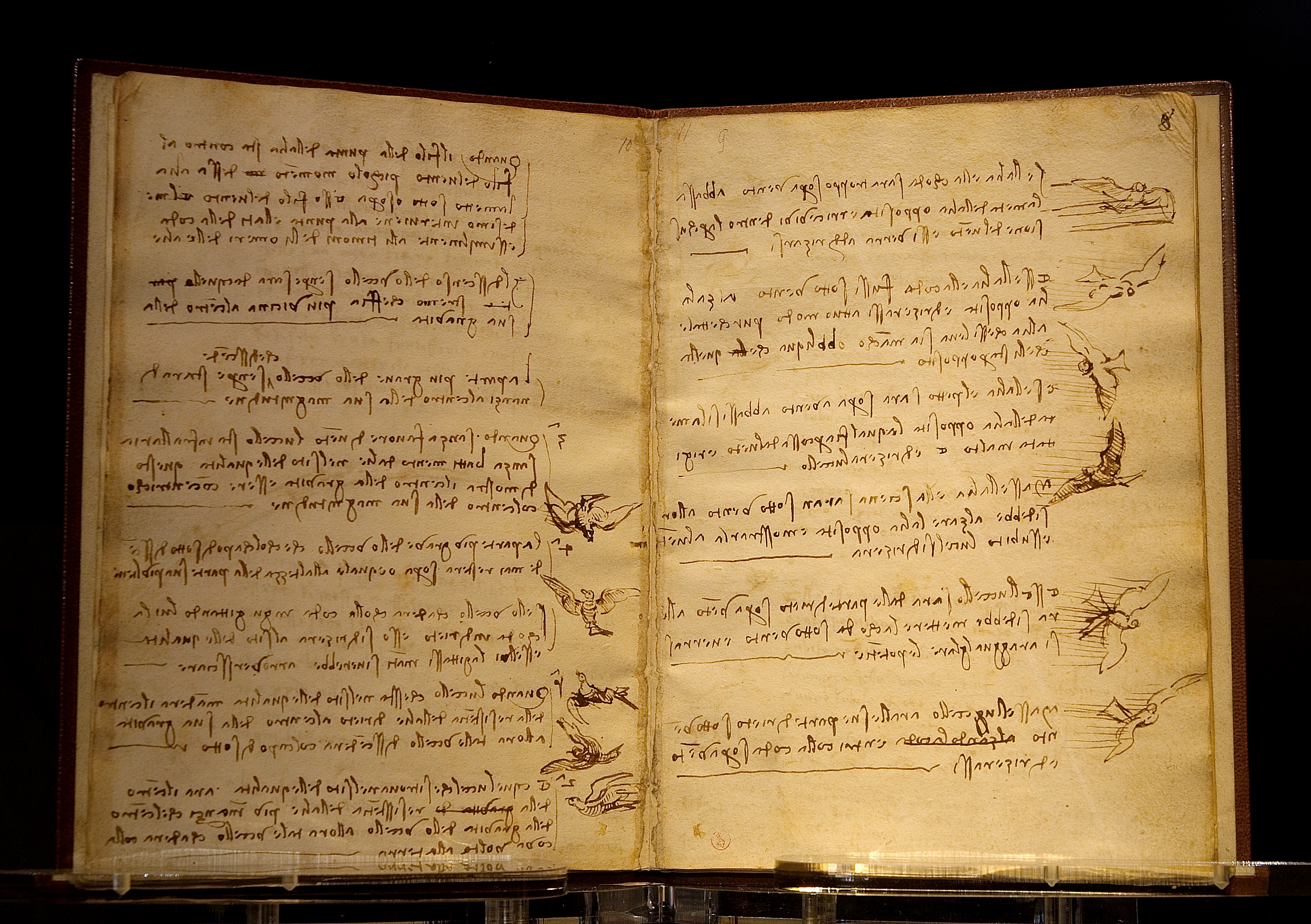
The codex open at folios 7v–8r

Codex on the Flight of Birds is a relatively short codex from c. 1505 by Leonardo da Vinci.

It comprises 18 folios and measures 21 × 15 centimetres. Now held at the Royal Library of Turin, the codex begins with an examination of the flight behavior of birds and proposes mechanisms for flight by machines. Leonardo constructed a number of these machines, and attempted to launch them from a hill near Florence. However, his efforts failed.

In the codex, Leonardo notes for the first time that the center of gravity of a flying bird does not coincide with its center of pressure.

== Summary ==
The following summaries are from the codex whose English translation was prepared by Culturando and Smithsonian Institution.

=== Front Page ===
The front page is titled "On Casting Medals". The first paragraph gives a brief recipe that consists of "emery", "nitric acid", "iron filings", "vinegar", "ashes of walnut leaves", and "finely ground straw ash". The second paragraph tells of the process of crushing diamonds into diamond powder and separating the powder from lead. The last paragraph explains how to crush large crystals into smaller crystals, and how to grind, purify, and color enamel.

=== Folio 1 ===
The first page in the folio one contains 11 diagrams with captions for each that relate to gravity, density, balance, and oscillations. The next page contains four diagrams and a lengthy paragraph on velocity and the differences in movement along the arc and chord of part of a circle.

Leonardo comments on how gravity, which is caused by the "attraction of one object to another", takes place when an object is placed above another object and the top object is heavier than the bottom object. He also writes on the workings of a balance by describing how "the vertical center of a balance must always be perpendicular" and how the length of the arm on the balance is proportional to the amount of oscillations and the oscillation angle. A short commentary is included on relating density to weight, and he questions why ice floats in water if it is the denser of the two.

In the last page of this folio, Leonardo explains why an object falling down the arc of a curve will fall faster than if the object falls down the chord of a curve. He explains this saying that the angle of the chord is half of the angle the curve makes between the midpoint, endpoint, and horizontal, and since this angle is half then the speed will also be half. He compares this with the angle the arc makes with the endpoint, midpoint, and horizontal. An object falling down an arc is then said to be 7/8 faster than if it were to fall down the chord of a curve.

=== Folio 2 ===
Folio 2 contains two images on each of the two pages along with commentary on the following: gravity, powder amount vs. shot diameter, center of gravity for pyramids, and round balances.

In the first paragraph, Leonardo restates his theory on gravity and expands on it to say that the motion caused by gravity acts in the direction of the imaginary line between the two object's centers. He goes on to say that motion due to gravity is only caused because the objects have no way to resist gravity.

Leonardo then goes on to talk about the relation between the amount of powder and the size of a ball. He writes that the amount of powder needed is proportional to the diameter of the ball. Expanding on that, he comes up with the amount of powder needed is "directly proportional to the square of the diameter".

The center of gravity of a pyramid is written to lie "in the third point along of its length toward the base". He uses this geometry to explain how to find the center of gravity of a semicircle. If one were to divide the semicircle into pyramids whose bases were almost straight, then by finding the center of gravity of those pyramids one could find the center of gravity for the semicircle.

The last page of folio 2 talks about rounded balances and how they react to gravity. Leonardo writes that if a balance was suspended in its center of gravity, then it would not move or oscillate, regardless of position. He then goes on to say that if there are two weights of equal mass on the ends of this balance, then, when moved from its starting position, the balance will never return to the starting position. After this, he theorizes that a balance in this same situation will move if one of the weights is along a straighter line of descent as compared to the other weight. He then disproves his theory by showing the balance and weights as symmetrically equal, meaning there is no reason for the balance to move.

=== Folio 3 ===
The third folio contains 10 drawings and commentary on the following: science of machines, balances, energy, and circular motion.

Leonardo begins folio 3 with a declaration stating the science of machines is the most useful science overall because of its use by any moving object.

He goes on to state that objects of different shapes that are on different degrees of slope have different amounts of energy. His next topic is about the construction of a certain balance in which circular motion is prevented. The diagrams in this folio represent round balances and multiple shaped objects on differing slopes that are connected together.

=== Folio 4 ===
Folio 4 contains nine diagrams and a page of text on gravity and its effect on different shapes connected together on a balance. The back page of this folio has Leonardo's first reference to birds and his explanation on how they fly.

Leonardo writes a lengthy amount of text about two weights that each weigh three pounds that are connected together on either side of a balance. The slopes that each object rests on are at different angles, however. Leonardo goes on to write that, because of the slopes, one weight may weigh three pounds, but it is only providing two pounds of force. The other weight, also three pounds, is similarly stated to only provide one pound of force because it is resting on a smaller incline. Later on this page, he writes on the forces a balance experiences depending on the location of weights on the balance. The first reference to pressure for this codex is made towards the end of this folio, relating it to the working of a balance.

The first commentary on birds, for this codex, are made on the second page of the fourth folio. Leonardo describes how the tips of a bird's feathers are always the highest part of the bird, when its wings are lowered, and how the bones in the wing are the highest part of a bird when its wings are raised. He writes on the heaviest part of a body being the location that guides movement for that body. He also questions what part of the wing of a bird experiences the greatest amount of air pressure. To end this folio, Leonardo states how an object, "that does not bend under the pressure of objects of different sizes and weights", will distribute its weight to its supporting points that surround the center of the object.

=== Folio 5 ===
The fifth folio contains six diagrams and commentary on birds and flight.

Leonardo starts off folio 5 by stating that if a man were to be in a flying machine, nothing should get in his way from the waist up, so that he can balance himself as one does in a boat. He goes on to write on how a bird's direction will change with the direction of the wind. A bird which is going in a straight line that comes into a cross breeze at a perpendicular angle will now be heading in a direction that is in between the two endpoints of each direction. He ends the first page by explaining that if a bird in a descent wants to turn left or right, then it will lower the wing on the side of the direction it wants to turn.

Birds can gain altitude, as stated by Leonardo, by "[raising] the shoulders and [beating] the tips of the wings towards itself, thus condensing the air that stands between the tips of [its] wings and itself". He also describes the flight of a kite as seeking a wind current. When the winds are high, one will see the bird very high in the sky, but when the winds are low, the bird stays closer to the ground. Leonardo describes how a bird rests in the air, after flapping its wings to gain altitude, by gliding downward to the ground.

=== Folio 6 ===
Folio 6 contains multiple diagrams of birds flying and their bone structure, and all of the commentary is on flight and how birds fly.

Leonardo starts off by describing how a bird ascends or descends in different wind conditions. Here is a summary.

How birds fly depending on wind direction, based on Leonardo's On the Flight of Birds
Wind Direction	Ascent	Descent
Headwind	Over the wind, with wind on breast	Under the wind, with wind on back
Left Wind	Left wing under wind	Left wing under the wind
Tailwind	Under the wind (debatable, according to Leonardo)	

He states that the only way for a bird to ascend when in a tailwind is for the bird, at its peak ascent, to turn in a semicircle and face the wind to continue its ascension in the opposite direction.

Leonardo explains that a bird should fly above the clouds to prevent its wings from getting wet and to avoid the circular air patterns that come from mountainous terrain. If a bird flies above the clouds and somehow gets turned over, then it should have plenty of time to turn itself back over by either "[falling] immediately with the wingtip downwind, or lowering the opposite wing to below halfway". He also comments on the rib structure of a bird and theorizes which ribs are the most useful. He ends folio 6 by stating he needs to do more practical tests on the ribs of birds.

=== Folio 7 ===
The seventh folio contains a very detailed diagram of either the tip of a bird's wing or the wing of a possible flying machine along with five more diagrams of birds in flight.

Leonardo starts writing on a flying machine and comparing it with the notes he has already taken on the flight of birds. He states that "the bird" (machine) must attain a high altitude it case it were to turn over so as to have enough time to right itself. He notes that the framework needs to be strong with leather laces and raw silk for the ribs. He also adds that there should not be any metal in the machine because of its tendency to wear or break under stress.

He continues his notes on the flying machine by writing on the "nerve" of the machine. It was to be made of a "thick ribbon of tanned leather" that would spread the wing in flight. He was going to use this same framework in the "nerves" above and below this one for safety reasons.

The rest of folio 7 is Leonardo's notes and instructions on how to fly his machine like a bird. Here is a quick summary:

Situation	Note
Wingtip is turned toward the wind	This wing must be put above or below the wind along with the side of the tail and the rudder of the wing's humerus
While descending	The side nearest to the center of gravity will descend first
While descending	The heavier part of the machine will be in front of the geometric center
While airborne, without wing-flapping, and without assistance from the wind	The machine's geometric center and center of gravity correspond
While descending	The heavier part of the machine will never be equal to or higher than the lighter part
While descending tail first	If tail rotates backward, the machine will regain balance. If tail rotates forward, the machine will flip over
While stably flying	If the resistance from the wing is moved behind the center of gravity, the machine will descend head first
While stably flying	If the resistance from the wing is moved in front of the center of gravity, the machine will descend tail first

=== Folio 8 ===
Leonardo's eighth folio in On the Flight of Birds contains 11 diagrams of birds flying and more instructions for his flying machine. Here is a quick summary of the first half of Folio 8:

Leonardo goes on to write that if the "bird" is above the wind but turning into the wind, the "bird" must lower its tail otherwise it will overturn. He states that the action of lowering the tail to be less susceptible to wind in this situation will make it impossible for the "bird" to be overturned. He goes on to prove this by referencing the "Elements of Machinery". Afterwards, he writes on the compression of air due to the wings, and he states that the entire length of the wing is not used in the compression of air in front of the wing. To prove this, he asks readers to examine bird wings for themselves and to check the larger spacing in between the not as large feathers.

=== Folio 9 ===
Folio 9 contains another 12 diagrams of birds in flight and structure framework. It particularly looks at the effect of wind on the movement of a bird.

=== Folio 10 ===
Discusses the wings of a bird.

=== Folio 11 ===
Discussion of the importance of truth

== Display in the U.S. ==
On a rare loan from the Bibliotecha Reale museum in Turin, Italy, the original 18-page codex was displayed in the National Air and Space Museum in Washington D.C. for 40 days, starting 13 September 2013. In an exhibition the codex was displayed in the Bibliotecha Reale museum in Turin until 8 March 2020.

== Sources ==
- Cremante, Simona. "Leonardo Da Vinci". Giunti, 1698.
- Crispino, Enrica; Pedretti, Carlo; Frost, Catherine. Leonardo: Art and Science. Giunti, 2001. ISBN 88-09-01511-8
- Pedretti, Carlo. "A Chronology of Leonardo Da Vinci's Architectural Studies after 1500". Geneva: E. Droz, 1962.
- Leonardo Da Vinci's Codex on the Flight of Birds (Smithsonian)
- Galluzzi, Paolo. Leonardo da Vinci, Engineer and Architect. [Montréal]: Montreal Museum of Fine Arts, 1987. Print. ISBN 2891920848
- Heydenreich, Ludwig H., Bern Dibner, Ladislao Reti, and Ladislao Reti. Leonardo the Inventor. New York: McGraw-Hill, 1980. Print. ISBN 0070286108
- Edoardo Zanon, The book of the codex on flight, from the study of bird flight to the flying machine. Leonardo3 – Milano, 2009. ISBN 978-88-6048-011-8
