= 89P/Russell =

Periodic comet

Discovery
- Discovered by: Kenneth S. Russell
- Discovery site: Siding Spring Observatory
- Discovery date: 28 September 1980

Designations
- MPC designation: P/1980 S1; P/1987 N1
- Alternative designations: Russell 2; 1980 III, 1987 XI; 1994 XXIX; 1980o, 1987q, 1994e

Orbital characteristics
- Epoch: 5 May 2025 (JD 2460800.5)
- Observation arc: 44.39 years
- Earliest precovery date: 9 August 1980
- Number of observations: 656
- Aphelion: 5.279 AU
- Perihelion: 2.222 AU
- Semi-major axis: 3.751 AU
- Eccentricity: 0.40751
- Orbital period: 7.264 years
- Inclination: 12.072°
- Longitude of ascending node: 41.345°
- Argument of periapsis: 250.42°
- Mean anomaly: 54.870°
- Last perihelion: 26 March 2024
- Next perihelion: 1 July 2031
- T_{Jupiter}: 2.903
- Earth MOID: 1.239 AU
- Jupiter MOID: 0.741 AU

Physical characteristics
- Mean diameter: 2.8 km (1.7 mi)
- Comet total magnitude (M1): 8.2
- Comet nuclear magnitude (M2): 16.3

89P/Russell is a periodic comet in the Solar System with a current orbital period of 7.26 years.

== Observational history ==
It was discovered on a photographic plate by Kenneth Russell of Siding Spring Observatory in New South Wales, Australia on 28 September 1980. Brightness was estimated at a magnitude of 17. The elliptical orbit calculated by Brian G. Marsden gave a perihelion date of 19 May 1980 and an orbital period of 7.12 years.

It has been observed on each subsequent apparition, most recently in 2009. The next perihelion is computed as 14 December 2016.

== See also ==
- List of numbered comets

Numbered comets
Previous; 88P/Howell	89P/Russell	Next; 90P/Gehrels
