= 83D/Russell =

Lost comet

Discovery
- Discovered by: Kenneth S. Russell at the UK Schmidt Telescope, Australia
- Discovery date: 16 June 1979

Orbital characteristics
- Epoch: 2021-05-26
- Observation arc: 6 years (Not observed in 41 years)
- Aphelion: 5.5 AU
- Perihelion: 2.1 AU
- Eccentricity: 0.44
- Orbital period: 7.5 yr
- Inclination: 17.8°
- Last perihelion: 2021-05-23? (unobserved)
- Next perihelion: 2028-11-30? (lost since 1985)

83D/Russell (previously 83P/Russell) is a periodic lost comet in the Solar System with an orbital period of about 7.5 years. On the post-1988 orbit the comet probably does not get brighter than about apparent magnitude 21. The comet might come to perihelion in late November 2028, but the uncertainty in the comet's position is a few million km. The comet has not been observed in 41 years.

== Discovery ==
The comet was discovered on a photographic plate on 16 June 1979 by Kenneth S. Russell at the UK Schmidt Telescope, Australia, who described it as faint and diffuse, with a very low brightness of magnitude 18. Calculations of its orbit suggested a perihelion date of 27 May 1979 and an orbital frequency of 6.13 years.

The predicted 1985 apparition was observed by J. Gibson using the 1.5-m reflector at Palomar Observatory, California. He estimated the brightness of the nucleus at a very faint magnitude 19.5.

== 1988 ==
On 9 August 1988 the comet passed 0.05 AU (7.5 million km) from Jupiter lifting perihelion (closest approach to the Sun) from 1.6 AU to 2.1 AU. This greater distance from the Sun makes the comet fainter, less active, and more difficult to recover.

Its predicted appearance in 1991 was not observed due to unfavourable conditions and it was missed again in 1998. In 2006, although conditions were favourable, the comet was not relocated and hence it is now classified as lost.

== 2021 ==
In mid-March 2021 the comet was expected to come to opposition in the constellation of Crater at around apparent magnitude 20.9.

== 2028 ==
In early January 2028 the comet may come to opposition in the constellation of Monoceros at around magnitude 23.7. In mid-June 2029 the comet may come to opposition in the constellation of Ophiuchus at around magnitude 22.2.

== See also ==
- List of numbered comets

Numbered comets
Previous; 82P/Gehrels	83D/Russell	Next; 84P/Giclas
