= 91P/Russell =

Jupiter-family comet

Discovery
- Discovered by: Kenneth S. Russell
- Discovery site: Siding Spring Observatory, Australia
- Discovery date: 14 June 1983

Designations
- MPC designation: P/1983 L1; P/1989 A4
- Alternative designations: Russell 3; 1982 IX, 1990 VII; 1983i, 1989d

Orbital characteristics
- Epoch: 21 November 2025 (JD 2461000.5)
- Observation arc: 38.21 years
- Number of observations: 423
- Aphelion: 5.207 AU
- Perihelion: 3.106 AU
- Semi-major axis: 4.156 AU
- Eccentricity: 0.25276
- Orbital period: 8.473 years
- Inclination: 16.015°
- Longitude of ascending node: 242.12°
- Argument of periapsis: 356.97°
- Mean anomaly: 235.59°
- Last perihelion: 9 November 2020
- Next perihelion: 26 October 2028
- T_{Jupiter}: 2.921
- Earth MOID: 1.593 AU
- Jupiter MOID: 0.084 AU

Physical characteristics
- Mean radius: 1.26 km (0.78 mi)
- Comet total magnitude (M1): 7.7
- Comet nuclear magnitude (M2): 15.6

91P/Russell, also known as Russell 3, is a Jupiter-family comet with an 8.47-year orbit around the Sun. It was discovered by Kenneth S. Russell in 1983.

Numbered comets
Previous; 90P/Gehrels	91P/Russell	Next; 92P/Sanguin
