= Madonna of the Rabbit =

Painting by Titian

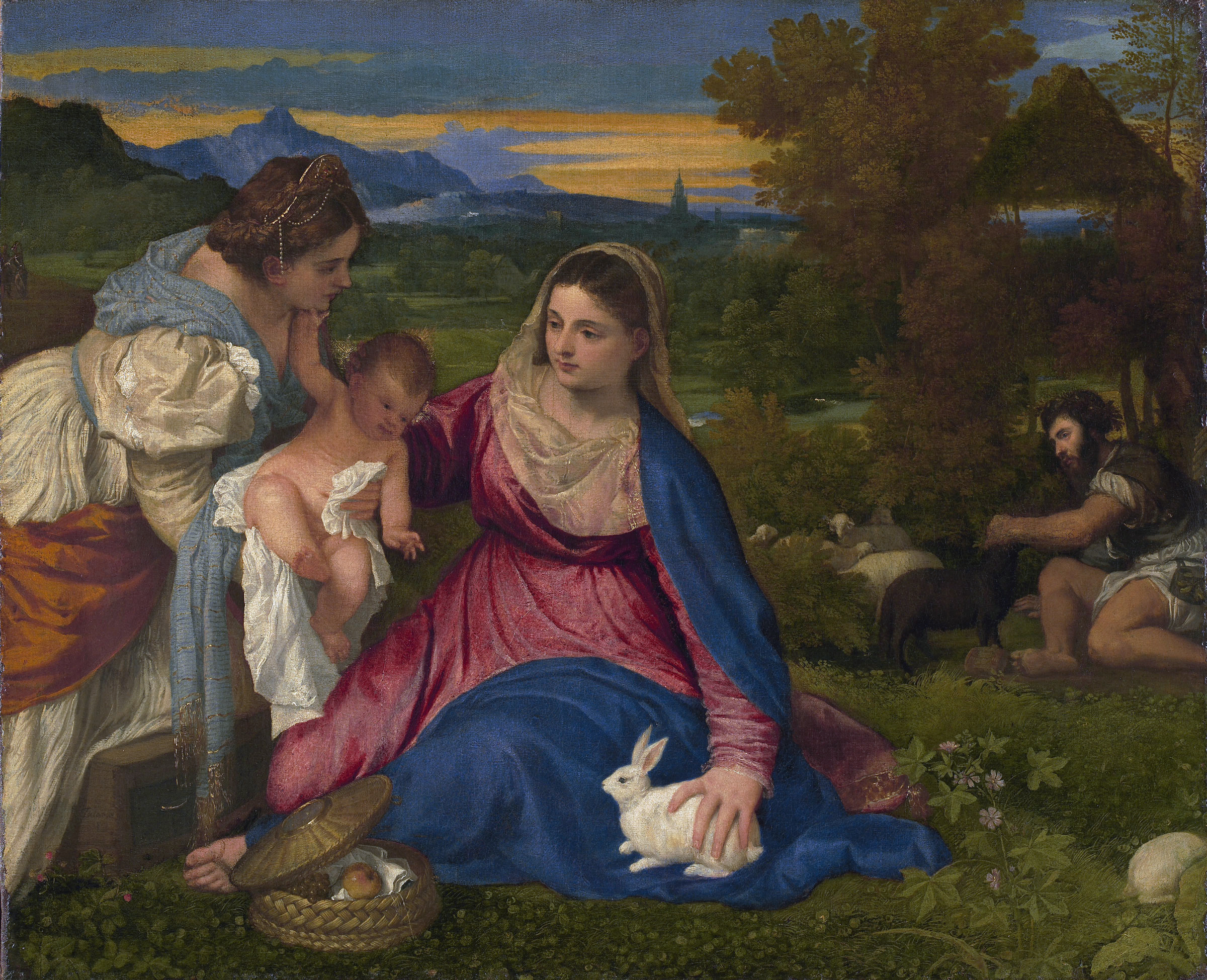
- Artist: Titian
- Year: c. 1530
- Medium: Oil on canvas
- Dimensions: 71 cm × 85 cm (28 in × 33 in)
- Location: Louvre; Paris

The Madonna of the Rabbit (French: Vierge au lapin) is an oil painting by Titian, dated to 1530 and now held in the Louvre in Paris. It is signed "Ticianus f." and is named after the white rabbit held in Mary's left hand. The rabbit is a symbol of fertility and – due to its whiteness – of Mary's purity and the mystery of the Incarnation, and is also a symbol of her virginity; female rabbits and hares can conceive a second litter of offspring while still pregnant with the first, resulting in their being able to give birth seemingly without having been impregnated.

== History ==
Records show that Federico Gonzaga commissioned three paintings from Titian in 1529. One of these can, with some security, be identified with the Madonna of the Rabbit. The painting's small format shows that it was intended for private devotion. The painting also contains echoes of the artist's personal circumstances at the time; on 6 August 1530 his wife Cecilia died giving birth to their third child, Lavinia, who was then entrusted to Titian's sister Orsa (just as the Christ Child in the painting is entrusted into another woman's hands, in this case Catherine of Alexandria). He was mourning and melancholic until at least October that year, as is shown in the letters sent to Mantua by the ambassador Benedetto Agnello.

The work was acquired with the rest of the Gonzaga collection in 1627 by Charles I of England and on his execution sold at auction. It was acquired in 1665 by the 2nd Duke of Richelieu and Louis XIV.

== Description and style ==
Catherine is dressed as a maid of honour and is shown with her traditional attribute of a broken wheel at her feet. She and Mary are sitting in a meadow beside a fruit basket which contains apples representing original sin and grapes representing the Eucharist and the redemption of sins. In the background a shepherd looks on – a motif drawn from Giorgione and perhaps intended as a portrait of Federico Gonzaga, since an X-ray shows that the initial composition had Mary turning her eyes towards the shepherd, or of the artist, since the shepherd appears sad and aloof like the mourning Titian.

In the foreground, the wildflowers evoke the idyllic locus amoenus in classical poetry and the Arcadian landscape, which is also found in works like the Pastoral Concert or the Baccanali series of Ferrara. The sensitive landscape painting is also notable, with orange stripes over a blue twilit sky, typical of Titian's highly mature phase.

== See also ==
- List of works by Titian
- Rabbits and hares in art

== Bibliography ==
- (in Italian) Francesco Valcanover, L'opera completa di Tiziano, Milan, Rizzoli, 1969.
- (in Italian) Stefano Zuffi, Tiziano, Milan, Mondadori Arte, 2008. ISBN 978-88-370-6436-5
