= Young Hare =

1502 watercolor by Albrecht Dürer

- Feldhase (German)
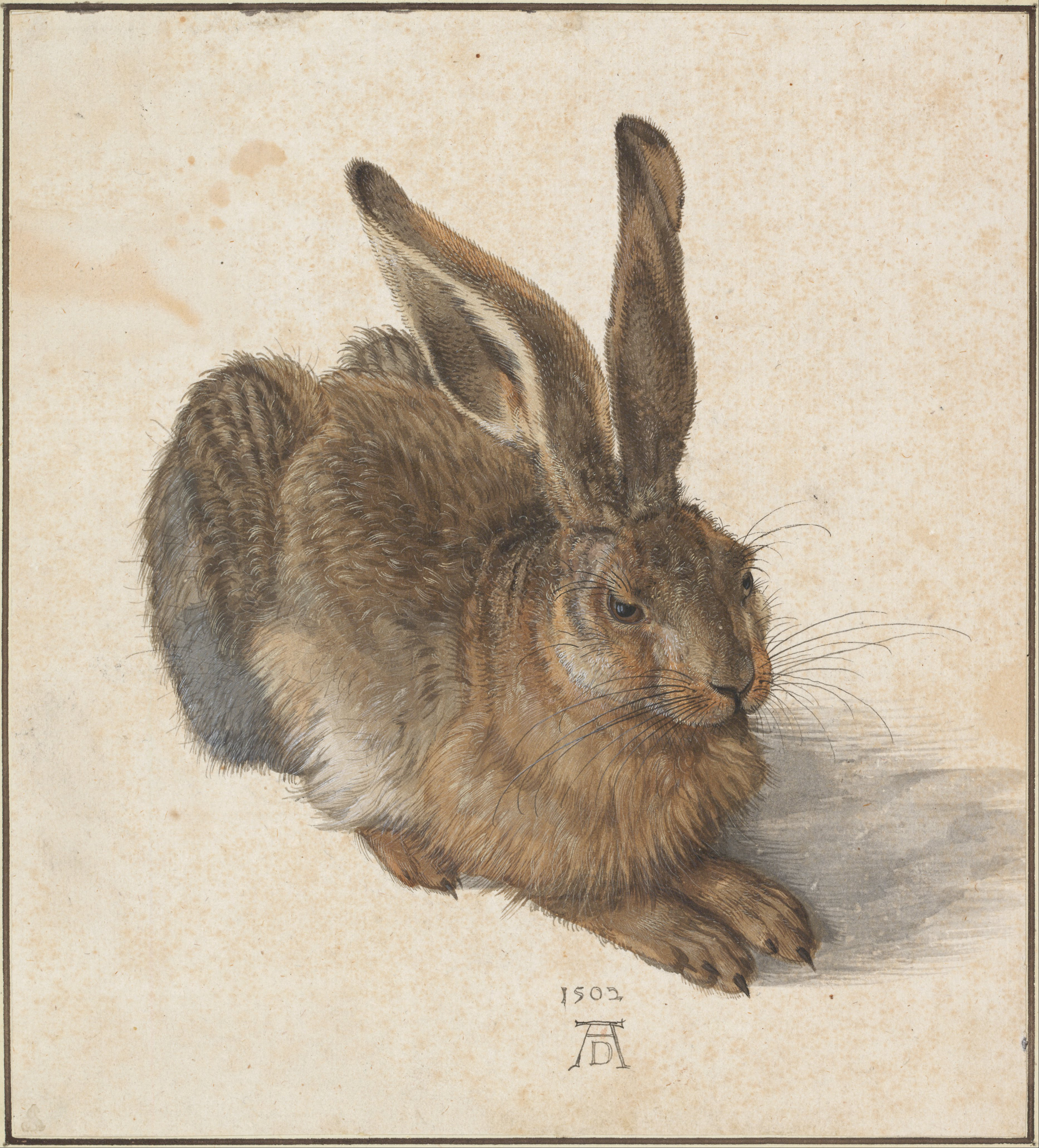
- Artist: Albrecht Dürer
- Year: 1502
- Medium: Watercolour and bodycolour on paper
- Dimensions: 25.1 cm × 22.6 cm (9.9 in × 8.9 in)
- Location: Albertina, Vienna
- Accession: 3073

Young Hare (German: Feldhase) is a 1502 watercolour and bodycolour painting by the German artist Albrecht Dürer. Although the piece is normally given the title Young Hare, the physical characteristics of the hare identify it as a mature specimen; the German title translates as "Field Hare" and the work is sometimes referred to in English as the Hare or Wild Hare.

Painted in 1502 in his workshop in Nuremberg, Germany, it is acknowledged as a masterpiece of observational art alongside his Great Piece of Turf from the following year. The subject is rendered with almost photographic accuracy.

The work remained in Dürer's workshop until his death in 1528. The work was then sold to Willibald Imhoff, to whom it belonged until 1588, when Imhoff sold it to Emperor Rudolf II due to financial difficulties. In 1691, the work made its final move to the Albertina Museum in Vienna, where it is still held.

== Background ==
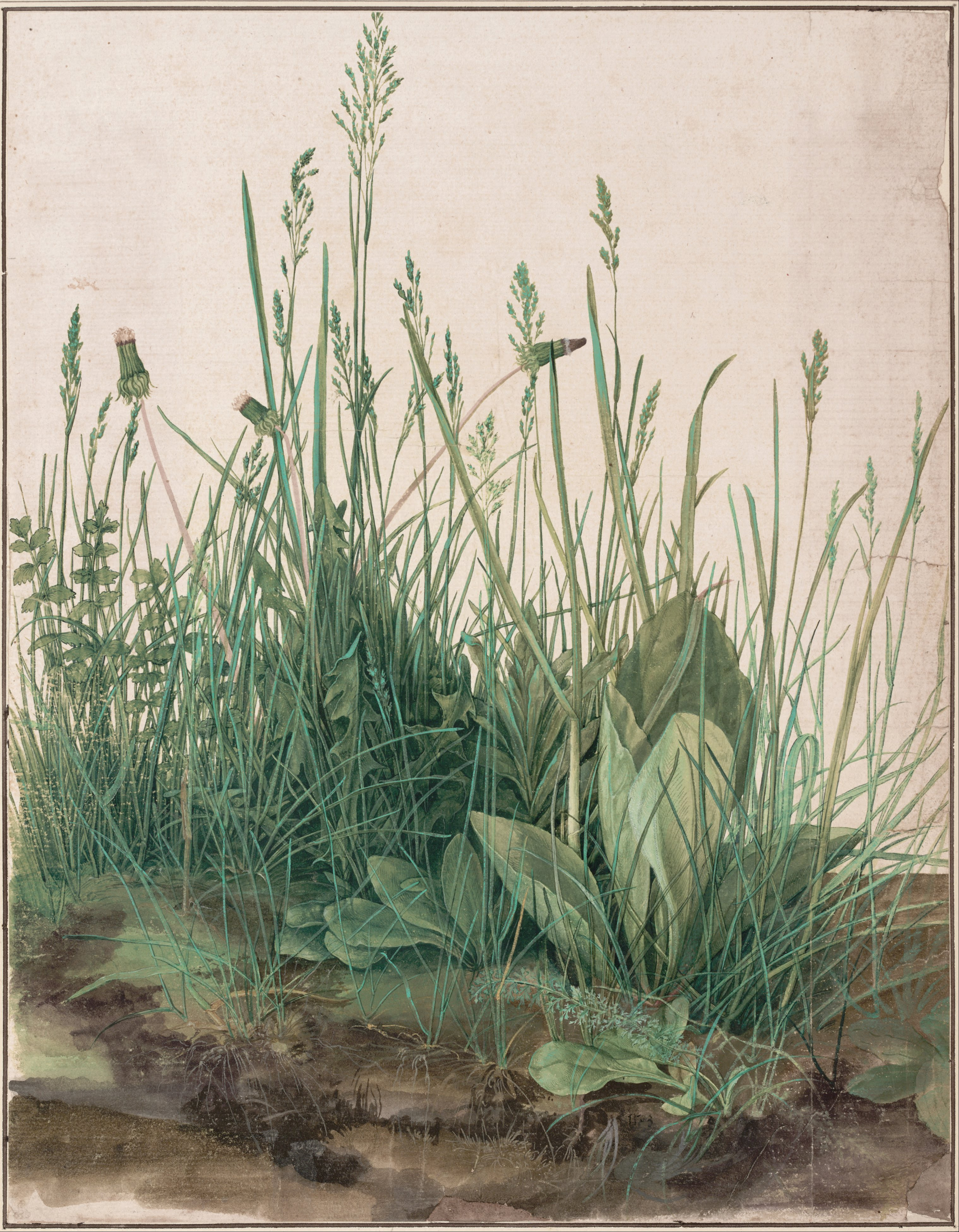
Great Piece of Turf by Albrecht Dürer. Created during the same period as the Young Hare during Dürer's time in nature studies.

Dürer created the Young Hare during his time studying nature from 1500 to 1505. Art historian Erwin Panofsky described Dürer's drive during this time to focus on portraying animals more realistically through right proportions. He explained that Dürer recorded "the most microscopic of observations" to make his work more realistic. Dürer's focus was on making improvements from his previous works, which Panofsky considered "powerful but unsound" because they lacked "right grounding" from "errors in design."

== Technique ==
Capturing the Young Hare was particularly challenging because the hare's fur lay in different directions, and the animal was mottled with lighter and darker patches all over. Scholars like Christof Metzger describe how Dürer's technique was "perfect here," giving the illusion that the hare was "on top of a sheet of paper." Despite the technical challenges presented in rendering the appearance of light with a multi-colored, multi-textured subject, Dürer not only managed to create a detailed, almost scientific, study of the animal but also infused the picture with a soft light that hit the hare from the left, creating a shimmer that emphasized the softness of the fur. He highlighted the ears and the run of hair along the body, which, based on the thickness and length of the fur, gives the impression of a winter coat. Metzger attributed the work's success to its attention to detail, describing Dürer's Young Hare as having "the most brilliant career of all his drawings."

Dürer used an underpainting of brown washes and then went over it with both light and dark brushstrokes. He used bodycolour and watercolor in a double cross-hatching method and used "infinitesimal strokes” to create the illusion of real hair. The use of differentiated pointy brushes in tones of brown, grey, and black enhanced the realism of the hare. Gradually, the painting was brought to completion with the addition of a few refined details, such as the whiskers and the meticulous details in the creature's eye. Art historian Fritz Koreny described Dürer's use of white and other colors within the eye that make the animal seem almost alive on the paper. The hare's eyes, as Koreny put it, "capture the animal’s personality." The Young Hare sits on a flat surface with his erected ears and both legs tucked, giving the illusion that the creature could jump up at any moment from the page.

== Accuracy and setting ==
There is some debate over how Dürer accurately depicted the animal. He may have sketched the hare in the wild and filled in the individual details from a dead animal, or captured one and held it alive in his studio while he worked on the painting. Within the eyes, there is a reflection of the window frame from Dürer's workshop, which has raised questions about the intended setting of the work. The reflection of the window frame in the hare's eye is often cited as evidence for the theory that Dürer copied the hare from life in his workshop, but this cross-barred reflection is a technique that Dürer frequently used to add vitality to the eyes of his subjects.

== Relation to prints ==
Dürer used his watercolour and bodycolour studies as source material for his prints. In other works, such as The Holy Family with Three Hares, the animals are modest. Similarly, in the 1504 copperplate engraving of Adam and Eve, the hare is turned away and appears half-hidden behind Eve's legs. The prominent date and Dürer monogram on the Young Hare indicate that he considered it a work in its own right rather than merely a preparatory sketch. The painting also inspired numerous copies, with at least twelve produced by contemporaries.

== Copies and influence ==
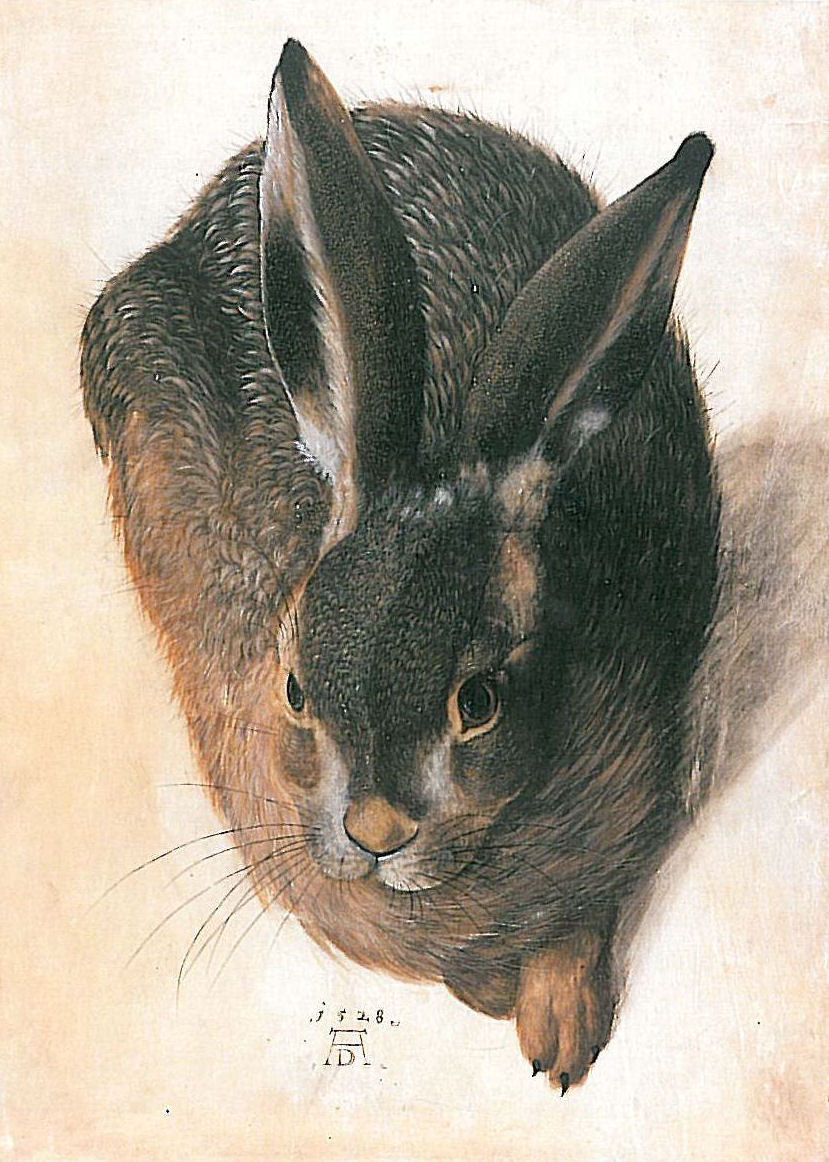
Hans Hoffmann's 1528 copy of the hare, which adapts freely from the source, still bears Dürer's monogram

Dürer's Young Hare was imitated by numerous artists. Hans Hoffmann produced several copies of the Young Hare and even attempted to copy Dürer's signature monogram. In Hoffmann's 1528 copy the featured AD monogram is visible just under the hare's body. His imitations of the hare expanded the reach of Dürer's work while inviting comparison between the two. Hoffmann created his works after Dürer's death, and many historians argue whether his recreations were admiration, replication, or forgery. Hoffmann closely followed Dürer's composition and naturalistic detail while introducing minor variations in technique and coloration.

== See also ==
- List of paintings by Albrecht Dürer
