= The Holy Family with Three Hares =

c. 1496 woodcut by Albrecht Dürer

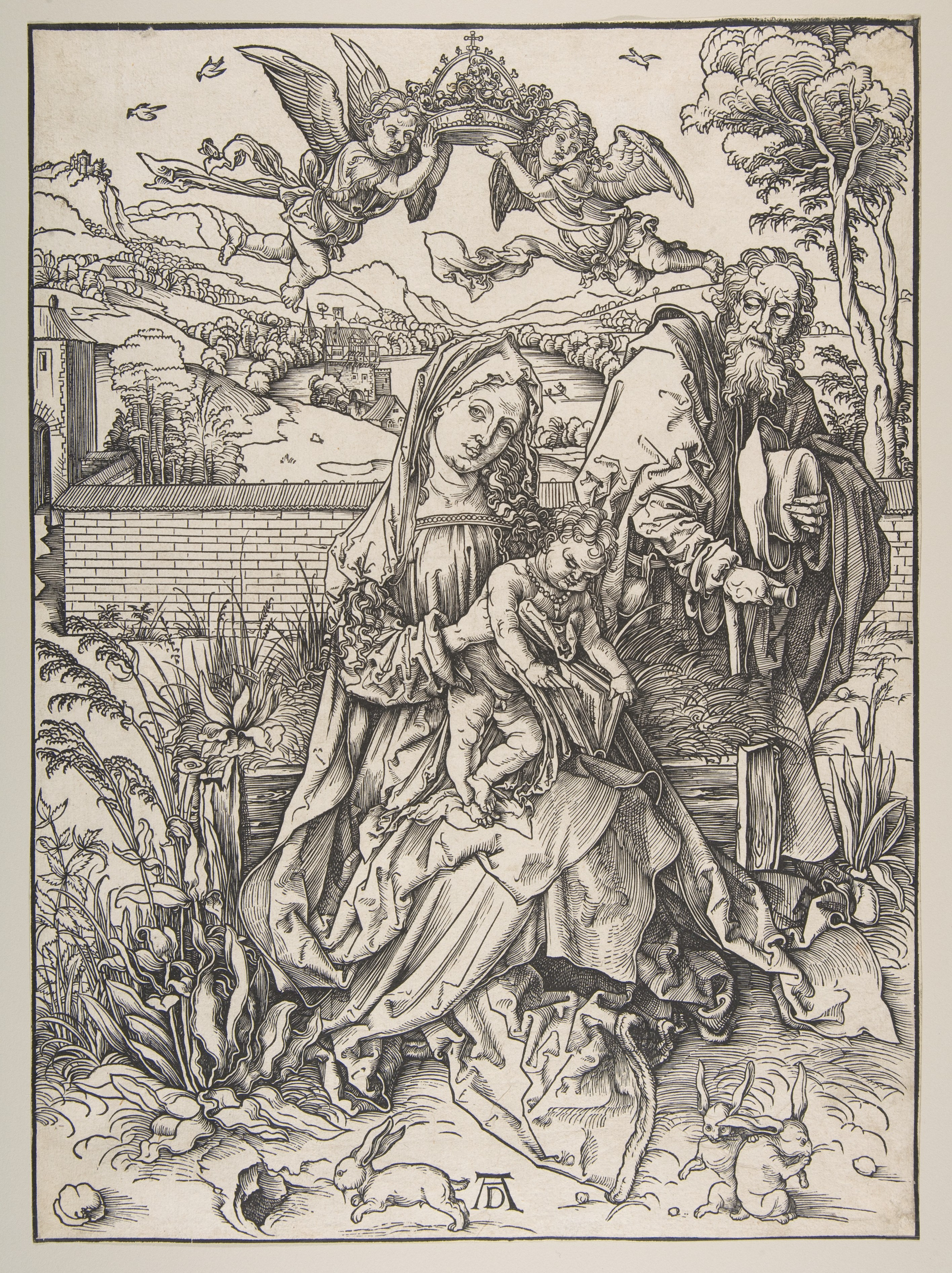
- Artist: Albrecht Dürer
- Year: c. 1496
- Type: Woodcut
- Dimensions: 38.6 cm × 28 cm (15.2 in × 11 in)

The Holy Family with Three Hares is a c. 1496 woodcut by German artist Albrecht Dürer (1471–1528).

== Description ==
It depicts the Christian Holy Family of Mary, Joseph, and the infant Jesus, in an enclosed garden, symbolizing Mary's virginity. The infant Jesus is reading from what is very probably a book of scripture, representing his close connection with the Word of God, not only because in Christianity he fulfills the Old Testament prophecy of a messiah, but also because in some Christian traditions Jesus has been described as the word of God.
