= October 1980 =

Month of 1980

<<	October 1980					>>
Su	Mo	Tu	We	Th	Fr	Sa
			1	2	3	4
5	6	7	8	9	10	11
12	13	14	15	16	17	18
19	20	21	22	23	24	25
26	27	28	29	30	31

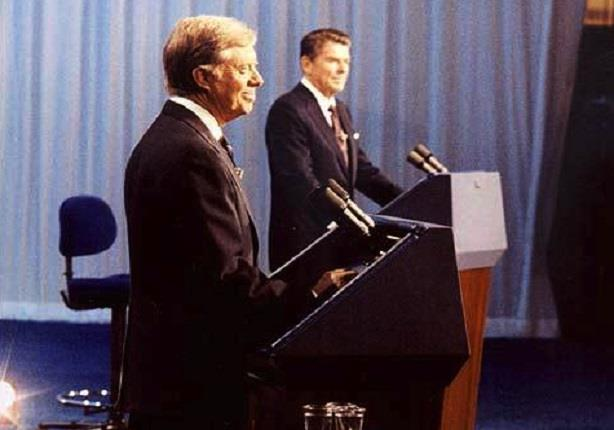
October 28, 1980: Carter and Reagan debate one week before election

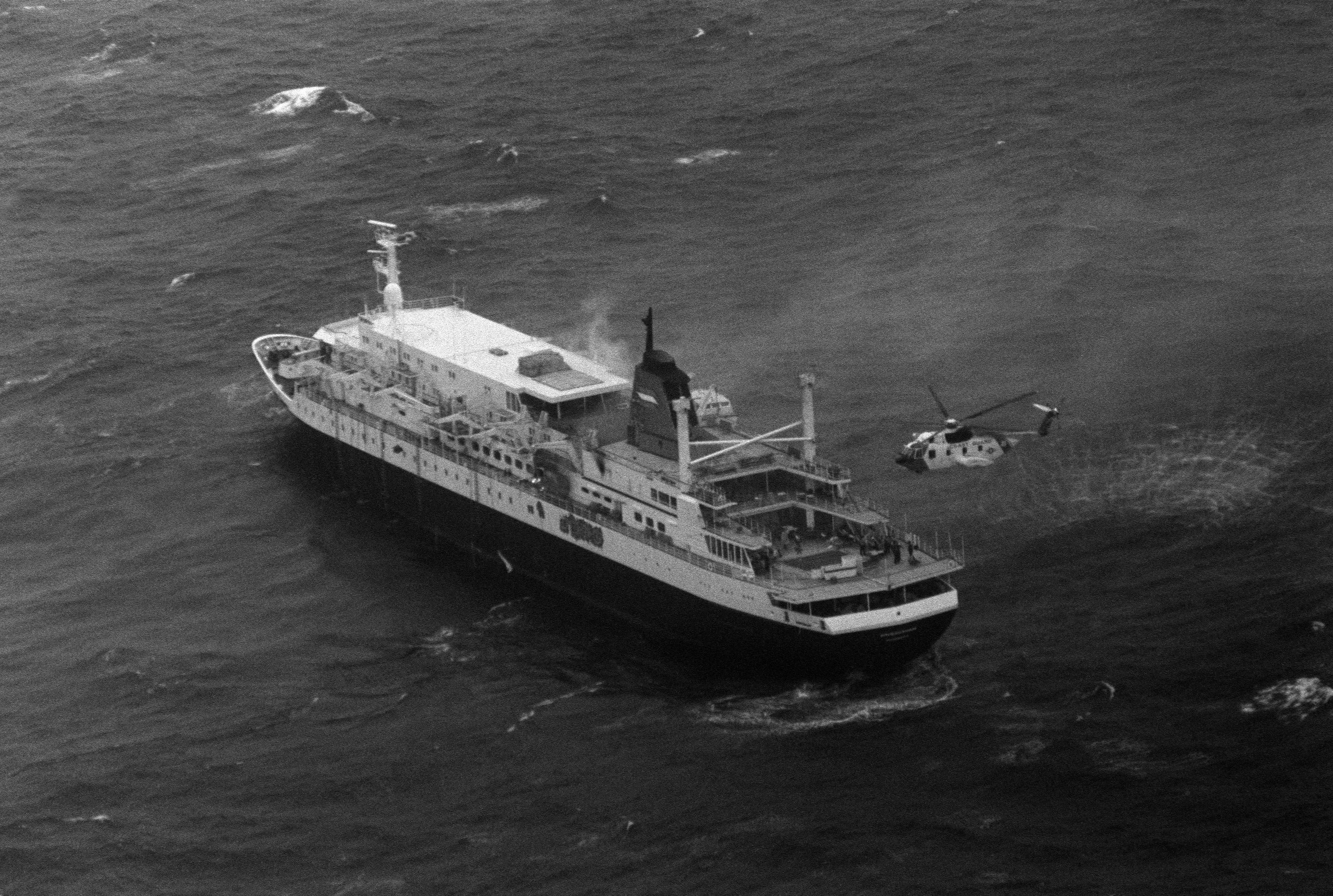
October 4, 1980: All 520 people on ocean liner Prinsendam saved at sea

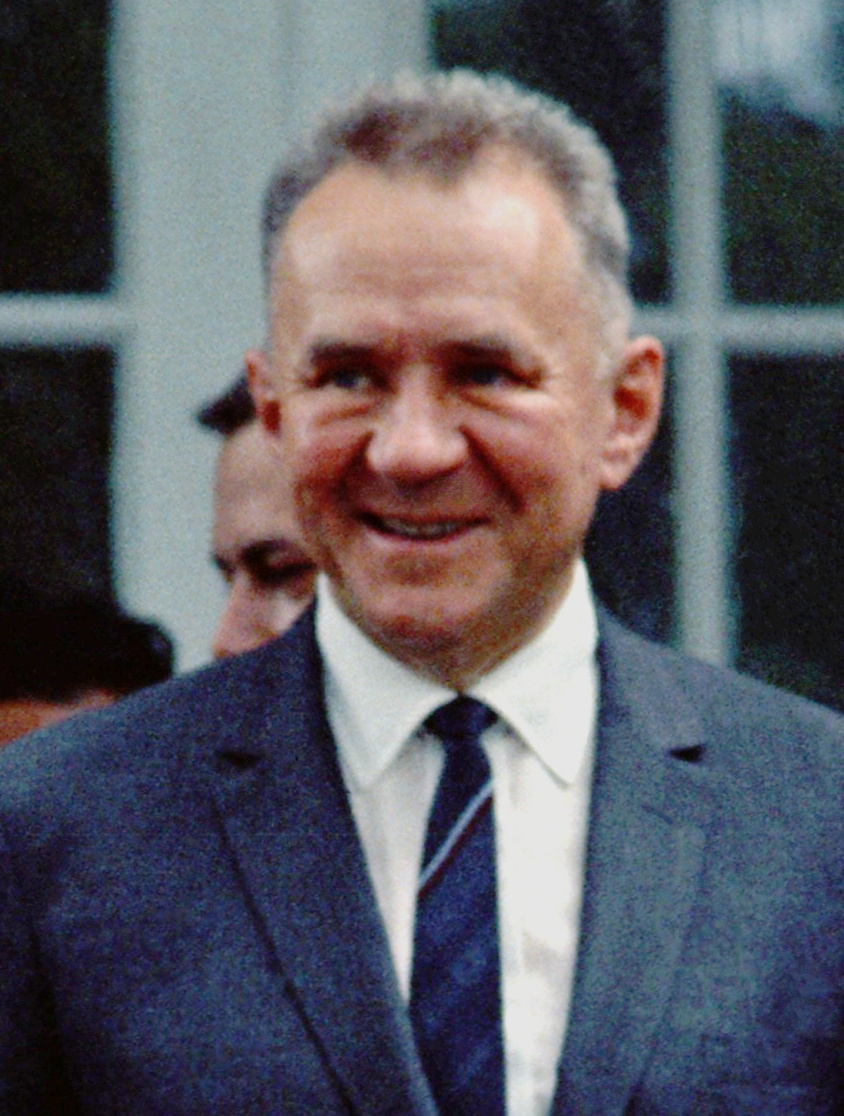
October 23, 1980: Soviet Premier Kosygin resigns

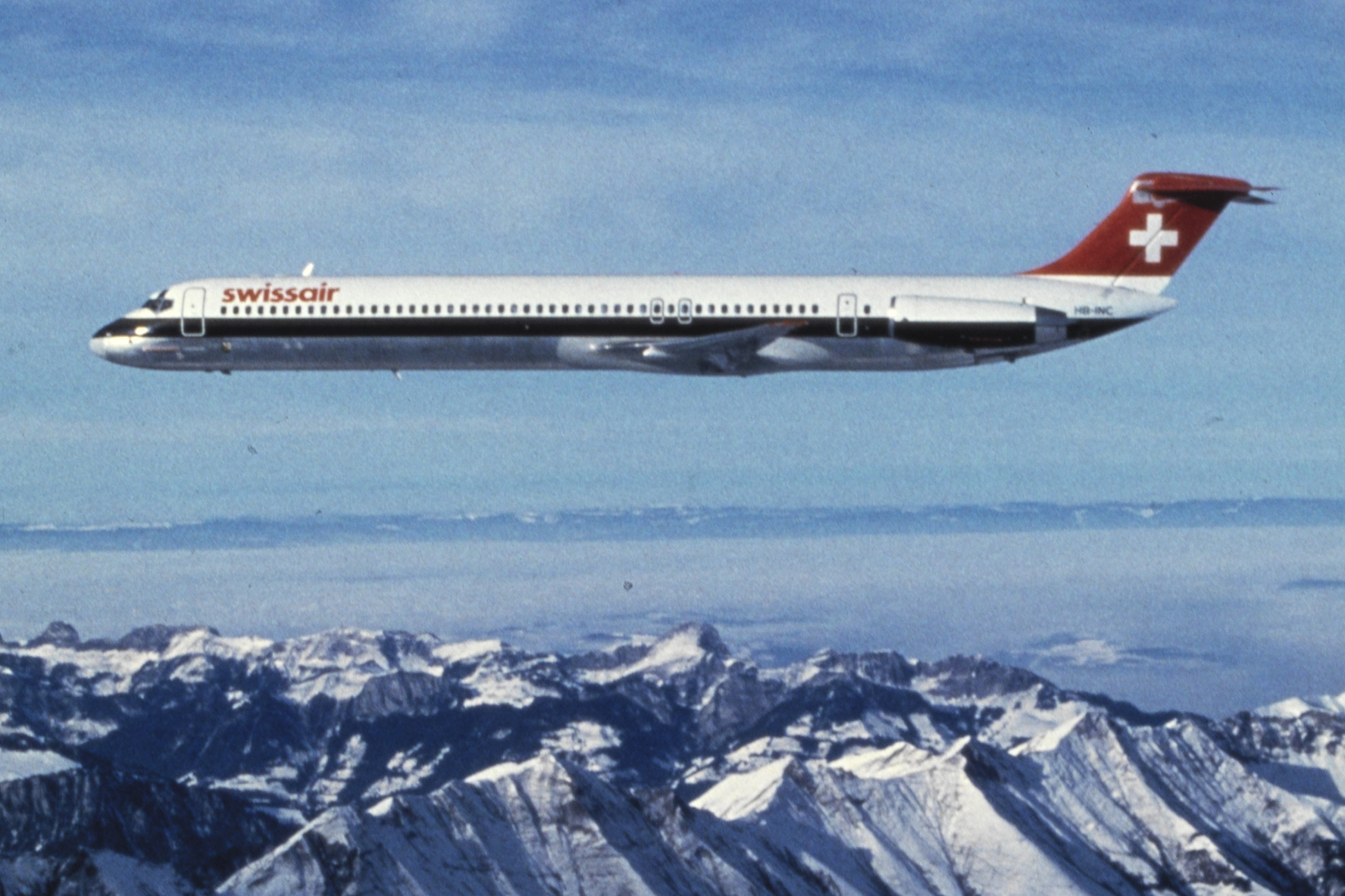
October 10, 1980: MD-80 service inaugurated

The following events happened in October 1980:

== October 1, 1980 (Wednesday) ==
- In London, Associated Newspapers announced that The Evening News would merge with the Evening Standard, with the Evening News folding later in the month after being published for 99 years.
- All corporate stock of Encyclopaedia Britannica, Inc., was transferred from the Benton Foundation to the University of Chicago.
- Born: Sarah Drew, American TV actress, in Stony Brook, New York

== October 2, 1980 (Thursday) ==
- The World Boxing Council (WBC) heavyweight title bout, Larry Holmes vs. Muhammad Ali, took place in Las Vegas and was estimated to have been watched by a record two billion viewers worldwide. Holmes scored a technical knockout (TKO) when Ali failed to answer the bell to begin the 11th round.

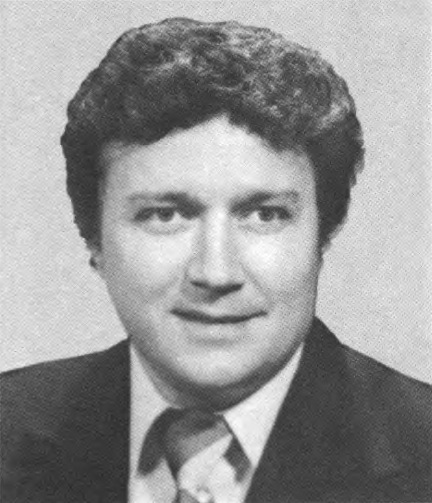
Ex-Congressman Myers, first to be expelled in 119 years

- Michael "Ozzie" Myers, U.S. representative from Pennsylvania, was expelled from the U.S. House of Representatives by a vote of 376 to 30, becoming the first U.S. Congressman to be expelled since 1861. In 1861, U.S. Congressmen John B. Clark and John W. Reid of Missouri, and Henry C. Burnett of Kentucky, had been expelled by the House in absentia after joining the Confederate Army. The move came after surveillance showed him accepting a $50,000 bribe in the Abscam operation. The videotape also showed Myers telling the offerer of the bribe, "Money talks and bullshit walks!".
- Former foreign minister Arnaldo Forlani agreed to attempt to form a new coalition government as the new prime minister of Italy, after a meeting with President Sandro Pertini.
- Died:
  - John Kotelawala, 85, Prime Minister of Ceylon (now Sri Lanka), from 1953 to 1956
  - Eric Hass, 75, U.S. activist and the presidential nominee of the Socialist Labor Party of America in the presidential elections of 1952, 1956, 1960 and 1964.

== October 3, 1980 (Friday) ==
- Roberto Viola, the former Argentine Army commander, was selected as the new President of Argentina by the South American nation's ruling three-member military junta.
- A terrorist bomb injured 50 people, four fatally, in a Jewish synagogue in Paris, shortly after the Sabbath started at sunset. Outrage over the attack and against other acts of anti-Semitism brought more than 100,000 protest marchers in Paris four days later.
- The Housing Act 1980 was given royal assent, wherein the five million English and Welsh residents of public housing council houses were eligible to purchase their homes under a "Right to Buy" program. Families that had rented a government-built house or a flat (an apartment) for at least three years were eligible to buy the homes, many of which had been defective, at a discount of at least one-third of fair market value for a house and 44% for a flat. The discount for 20-year tenants was 50 percent.
- Died: Gustav Wagner, 69, Austrian-born Nazi German officer and deputy commander of the Sobibor extermination camp, committed suicide in Brazil, two years after efforts began to have him extradited.

== October 4, 1980 (Saturday) ==
- The ocean liner MS Prinsendam was sailing through the Gulf of Alaska and was 130 miles (210 km) away from the nearest rescue base, located in the Alaskan airstrip at Yakutat, when a fire broke out in the engine room. Despite the distance that rescuers had to travel to reach the Dutch cruise ship, all 520 passengers and crew were rescued without a loss of life or serious injury. The supertanker Williamsburgh brought 380 evacuees and paramedics to safety, while U.S. and Canadian coast guard cutters were able to bring in other passengers, including 20 who had been missing after their lifeboat had been drifting during the night in the Gulf of Alaska. The safe evacuation of everyone on Prinsendam "brought to a close one of the most dramatic air and sea rescues in modern times."
- With one month left before the November 4 U.S. presidential election, a survey of politicians and opinion pollsters in the 50 U.S. states was released, concluding that Republican presidential candidate Ronald Reagan had a clear lead in enough states to garner 314 electoral votes, far more than the 270 needed to win, and that the incumbent, Democrat and U.S. president Jimmy Carter would get only 136. There were nine "swing states" where the race was too close to call. third party challenger John B. Anderson did not have a lead in any of the states.

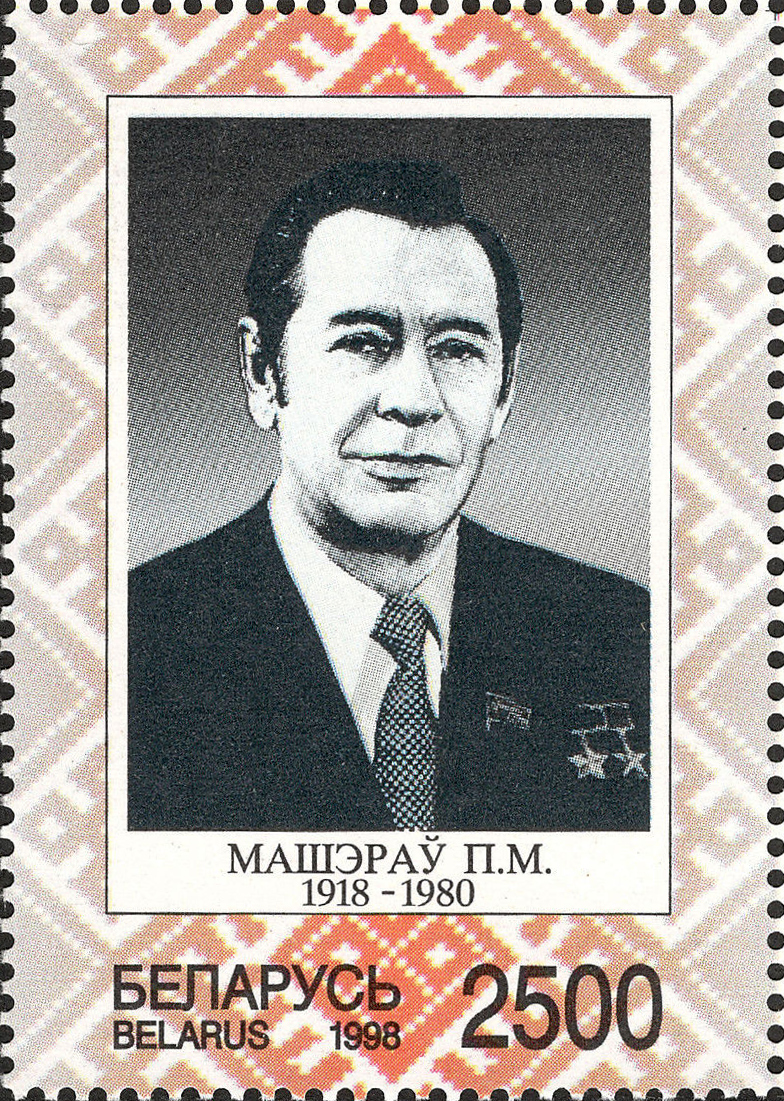
Masherov commemorative stamp

- Born:
  - Tomáš Rosický, Czech footballer and captain of the Czech Republic national team; in Prague, Czechoslovakia
  - Joe Kennedy III, U.S. Congressman since 2013; in Boston
  - Jason Samuels Smith, American choreographer, in Shreveport, Louisiana
- Died: Pyotr Masherov, 62, Belarusian Soviet politician and the First Secretary of the Communist Party of the Byelorussian SSR, was killed in an automobile accident in Minsk. Masherov, the de facto leader of the Byelorussians as Communist Party leader and a non-voting member of the Soviet Communist Party's Politburo, was being driven with a police escort when his GAZ-13 Chaika limousine was struck by a truck. He was succeeded by Tikhon Kiselyov. Reportedly, he "had been regarded as one of the relatively younger members" of the Communist Party "likely to be chosen when the time came for a new Prime Minister or Communist Party Chief."

== October 5, 1980 (Sunday) ==
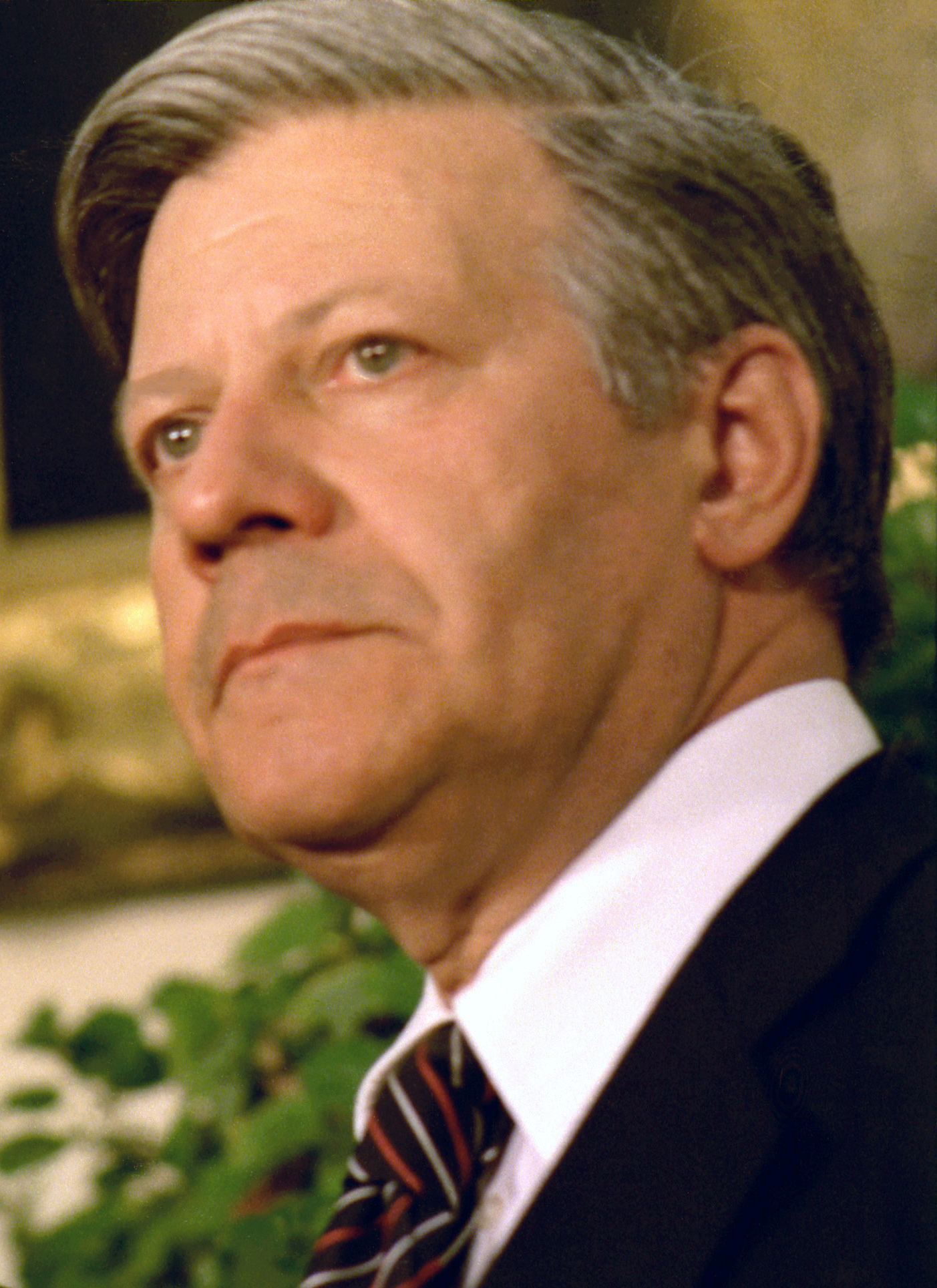
Chancellor Schmidt

- Voting took place for West Germany's lower house of parliament, the Bundestag. With 224 seats, Chancellor Helmut Schmidt's Sozialdemokratische Partei Deutschlands (SPD) party combined with 54 seats of its coalition partner, the Freie Demokratische Partei (FPD) to continue the exiting majority, with 278 of the 519 seats.
- Voting took place for Portugal's parliament, the Assembleia da República. Prime Minister Francisco Sá Carneiro's Partido Social Democrata (PSD) increased its majority to 134 of the 250 seats.
- At the age of 54, Cuban-born U.S. baseball star Minnie Miñoso appeared at bat for a second and final game as a pinch hitter for the Chicago White Sox, becoming the second major leaguer to play in five different decades (the 40s, 50s, 60s, 70s and 80s).
- The Elisabeth blast furnace was demolished at Bilston Steelworks marking the end of iron and steel production in the Black Country of England.
- Gail Tate, a woman in the United States Air Force, survived a fall of 4,500 feet (1,400 m) after her parachute and reserve chute became tangled. Despite striking the ground at 120 miles per hour (190 km/h), Tate sustained non-life-threatening injuries and later returned to work at Fort Fisher.
- Born:
  - James Toseland, English motorcycle racer and 2007 World Superbike Champion, in Doncaster, South Yorkshire
  - Ti West, American horror film director, in Wilmington, Delaware
- Died: Tobin Sorenson, 25, American rock climber who had made the first ascents on vertical walls of several mountains around the world, fell to his death while trying to climb the North Face of Mount Alberta.

== October 6, 1980 (Monday) ==
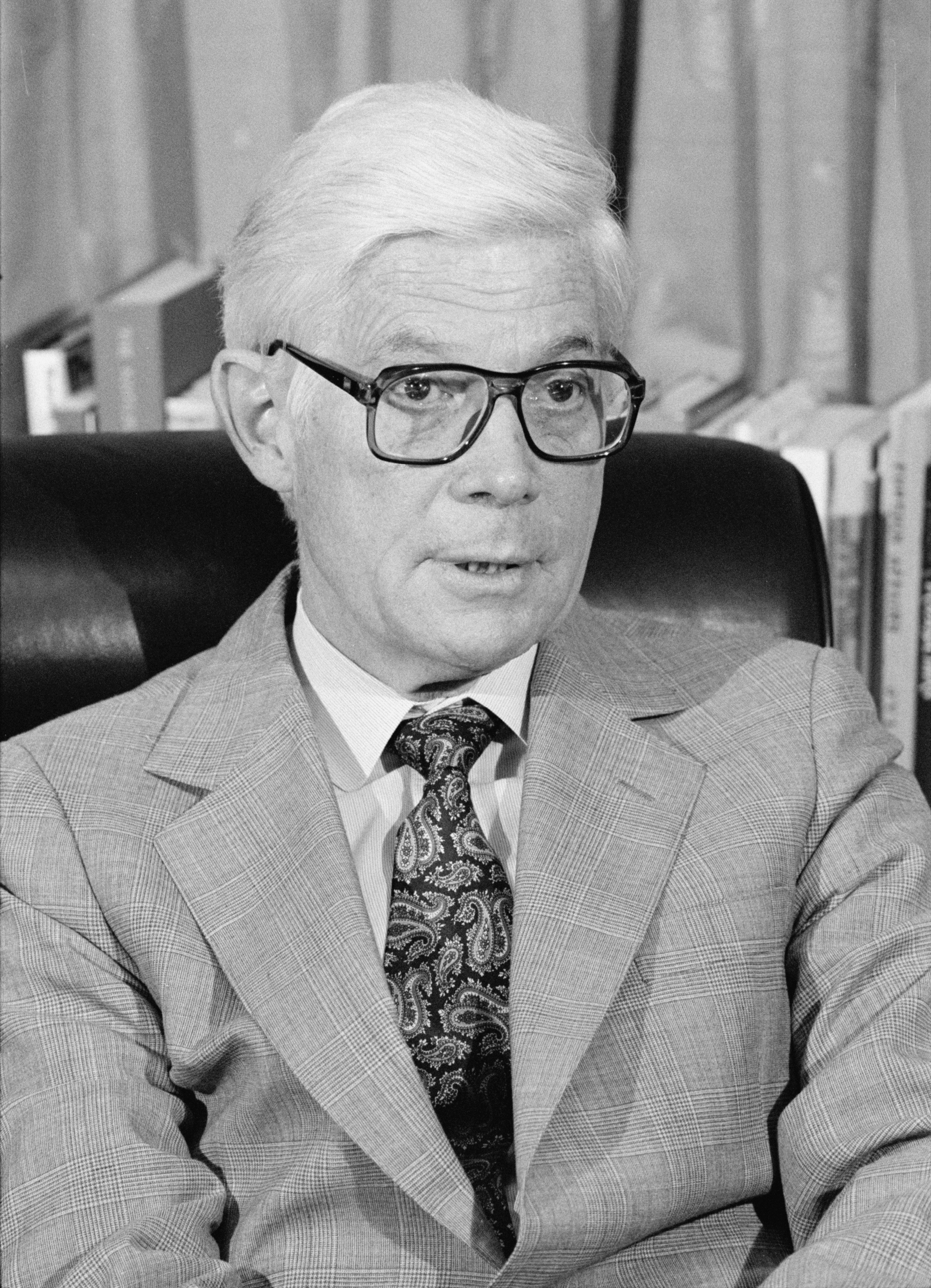
Anderson

- U.S. representative John B. Anderson of Illinois achieved his goal as a third-party candidate for President of the United States of being on the election ballots in all 50 U.S. states and the District of Columbia. The U.S. Fifth Circuit Court of Appeals refused to abate a district court decision to require that Anderson's name be placed on all ballots in the state of Georgia, clearing the way for ballots to be sent to the printers the next day.
- Forbes Burnham, Prime Minister of Guyana and head of the nation's government since before the 1966 independence of British Guiana, became the South American nation's second president, replacing President Arthur Chung, who had served as a ceremonial head of state since 1970, when Burnham had proclaimed the Co-operative Republic of Guyana. The new constitution had taken effect, confirming the nation's status as a "co-operative republic" and giving the president the powers formerly exercised by Burnham as prime minister.
- Sweden's armed forces ended their 19-day search for an elusive foreign submarine that had sailed into the Scandinavian kingdom's territorial waters on September 19. The sub, believed to be from the Soviet Union navy, had apparently navigated to safety in international waters.
- After the Los Angeles Dodgers and the Houston Astros both finished regular play with 92 wins and 70 losses, the two teams played a tiebreaker game, only the seventh in MLB history. The Astros won, 7 to 1, to finish 93-70 and the National League West pennant. They lost the best-of-five National League championship series to the Philadelphia Phillies.
- Died: Hattie Jacques, 58, English comedian and film actress

== October 7, 1980 (Tuesday) ==
- Iraq announced the territorial waters of Iran were a "prohibited war zone" and that any vessel inside the zone was subject to destruction—including the ships of other countries besides Iran. The next day, Iranian troops defending Khurramshahr fired shells that sank three foreign cargo ships (registered in China, Panama and Dubai) and set two others on fire, killing at least 20 crewmen.
- U.S. representative John Jenrette (D-South Carolina) became the second member of Congress to be convicted of accepting an offer of a bribe in the FBI's Abscam investigation. He was defeated for re-election four weeks later and resigned his seat on December 10, 24 days before the expiration of his term.

== October 8, 1980 (Wednesday) ==
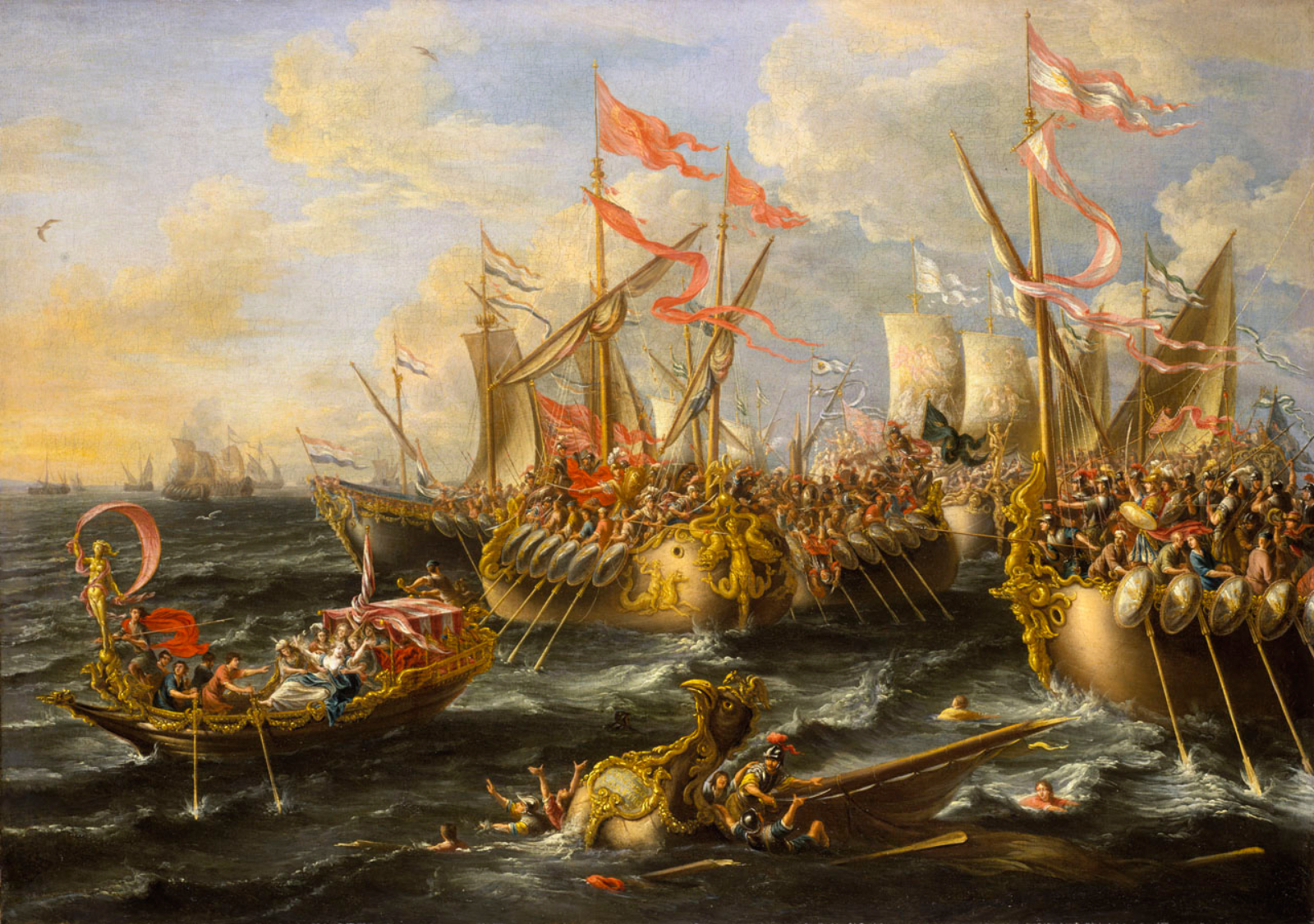
A 17th century reimagining of the Battle of Actium

- Archaeologists with the Greek Ministry of Transport and Communications reported that shipwrecks from the Battle of Actium had been located off of the coast of Actium near the entrance to the Ambracian Gulf. The battle had been fought more than 2,000 years earlier, on September 2, 31 BCE, during the civil war in the Roman Republic as two rival members of the Second Triumvirate engaged the fleets under their command in combat. The forces under the command of Gaius Octavianus defeated those of Marcus Antonius Creticus, supplemented by Egyptian Queen Cleopatra.
- More than 150 people were killed in Iran in the city of Dizful by three Frog-7 missiles fired by Iraq. The Soviet made missiles, 30 feet (9.1 m) long, were part of an arsenal of 26 such missiles, referred to by NATO as FROG for "Free Rocket Over Ground". In another attack on Dizful on October 26, another 100 people were killed when Iraq used three more of the Frog-7 weapons.
- Nine passers-by were killed and 28 others injured in Ecatepec de Morelos, a suburb of Mexico City, after 12,000 US gallons (45,000 L) of liquefied ammonia spilled from a ruptured pipe while the toxic liquid was being pumped into a pressurized railroad car. At 6:30 in the morning local time, the vapor from the liquid spread in a cloud across the San Pedro Xalostoc, an industrial district at Ecatepec. Three of the dead were passengers on a bus and four others died when they drove their cars through the cloud, while two pedestrians were killed as they walked through the street.
- Syria and the Soviet Union signed a treaty in Moscow during the visit of Syrian president Hafez al-Assad as the guest of Soviet Communist Party leader Leonid Brezhnev. Though not a defense pact, the 20-year treaty of friendship provided for the Soviets to provide weapons to Syria.
- The new military government of Turkey carried out the first executions in that republic since 1972 in a move "evidently meant to show the determination of the country's new military rulers to act severely against political terrorism, which was one of the factors in bringing about the military coup." Necdet Adali, a leftist convicted of the 1977 murder of two opponents in 1977, and Mustafa Pehlivangolu, a right wing extremist who had killed five people in 1978, were both hanged at 4:00 in the morning at the prison in Ankara.
- Pope John Paul II told his weekly general audience that "even if a man looks at woman who is his own wife" with lust, he was committing the sin of adultery. The Pontiff based his reasoning on the New Testament statement that Jesus was speaking of looking at any woman with lustful desire, with no exception for marriage.
- Stuntman Jaromir Wagner of West Germany set a record in the sport of wing walking as he became "the first person to cross the Atlantic Ocean on the outside of an airplane." Wagner, who spent his entire time in the air standing and walking on top of the wing of a twin-engine biplane, had departed Giessen, in West Germany on September 27 and made stops along the way in Scotland, the Faeroe Islands, Iceland and Greenland before reaching North America, then stopped at the Canadian province of Newfoundland and the U.S. state of Vermont before touching down in Fairfield, New Jersey.
- An attempt by the Jordache clothing company to fly a dirigible, as part of a promotional campaign for its fashion designer jeans, ended when the airship crashed on its maiden flight after takeoff from Lakehurst, New Jersey, half a mile from the site of the 1937 Hindenburg disaster. The 170 foot (52 m) long blimp took off at 8:15 with a destination of a fashion show at New York City's Battery Park, but after traveling 600 feet (180 m), it split a seam and began deflating. Pilot James Boza was uninjured after making a controlled descent.
- Born:
  - Nick Cannon, American comedian and TV host; in San Diego
  - The Miz (ring name for Michael Mizanin), American professional wrestler; in Parma, Ohio
- Died: Dr. Pearl Kendrick, 90, American bacteriologist known for her co-development (with Grace Eldering and Loney Gordon) for the vaccine against pertussis (whooping cough)

== October 9, 1980 (Thursday) ==
- A group of 102 refugees from Haiti was spotted on the deserted island Lobos Cay by a U.S. Coast Guard airplane on patrol in the Caribbean. Lobos Cay, also referred to as Cayo Lobos (Spanish for "Key of the Wolves"), was described as "a speck of land the size of a football field" and was one of the Bahama Islands under Bahamian jurisdiction. According to Claude Peter, the captain of a 33 foot (10 m) long sailboat that had been chartered to take the refugees from Haiti to Miami, the boat had been forced ashore on September 25 during a storm and then had drifted away after it had been evacuated. Airdrops of food, water and medical supplies were made by the U.S. later in the day and the days that followed. Before they had been discovered, five of the Haitians had died of starvation. Lobos Cay, located more than 300 miles (480 km) from Haiti, is in the Bahama Channel and about 25 miles (40 km) from Cuba, at the boundary of the territorial waters between the Bahamas and Cuba. The only shelter on the island was an automatically operated lighthouse and some smaller buildings. Because of disputes between officials of the Bahamas, Haiti and the United States on which nation should rescue the castaways, the refugees remained marooned for more than a month and were ultimately transported from the Bahamas back to Haiti on November 16.
- John W. Hinckley Jr., was arrested in Nashville, Tennessee after a handgun was found in his carry-on luggage while he was attempting to board an American Airlines flight. Because he had no felony convictions in any state, he was released after paying a fine of $62.50 and pleading guilty to a misdemeanor. Hinckley had been following the campaign trail of U.S. president Jimmy Carter, who had been campaigning in the city half an hour earlier. Earlier, Hinckley had gone to a Carter campaign stop at Dayton, Ohio (where he got within six feet of the President but had not brought along a gun) and to Nashville. Hinckley would later shoot Carter's successor, U.S. president Ronald Reagan, on March 30, 1981.
- Mary Cunningham, a vice president of the Bendix Corporation, resigned after accusations that her rapid promotion to a high-level corporate job had been the result of an alleged extramarital affair with the company's CEO, William Agee.
- Relatively unknown outside of Poland, poet and novelist Czeslaw Milosz was awarded the Nobel Prize in Literature. Milosz, who had fled Poland in 1951 after serving the postwar Communist government as a diplomat, fled to Paris and later became a U.S. citizen. He was serving was a professor at the University of California Berkeley at the time of the award.
- The National Hockey League's Calgary Flames played their first home game after having relocated from Atlanta. The team was the first in NHL history to sell more season tickets to people who were fine with standing rather than sitting in any of the 6,388 seats at the Stampede Corral arena.

== October 10, 1980 (Friday) ==
- A 7.1 magnitude earthquake in Algeria killed at least 2,633 people, most of them in the city of Al-Asnam (formerly Orleansville and subsequently renamed Chlef). Most of the destruction of Al-Asnam occurred during the 30 seconds of the quake, which was followed by a 7.5 tremor that destroyed villages outside of the city. The Algerian Red Crescent Society, part of the International Federation of Red Cross and Red Crescent Societies, estimated that the death toll was 17,000 people (later re-estimated at 6,000 people and estimated that 250,000 were left homeless.
- The Farabundo Martí National Liberation Front (FMNL) was formed in El Salvador as an umbrella group from the merger of five leftist guerrilla organizations.
- The United Nations Convention on Certain Conventional Weapons (CCW or CCWC), concluded at Geneva on October 10, 1980, and entered into force in December 1983.
- The McDonnell Douglas MD-80 was put into commercial service for the first time, as part of the Swissair fleet.

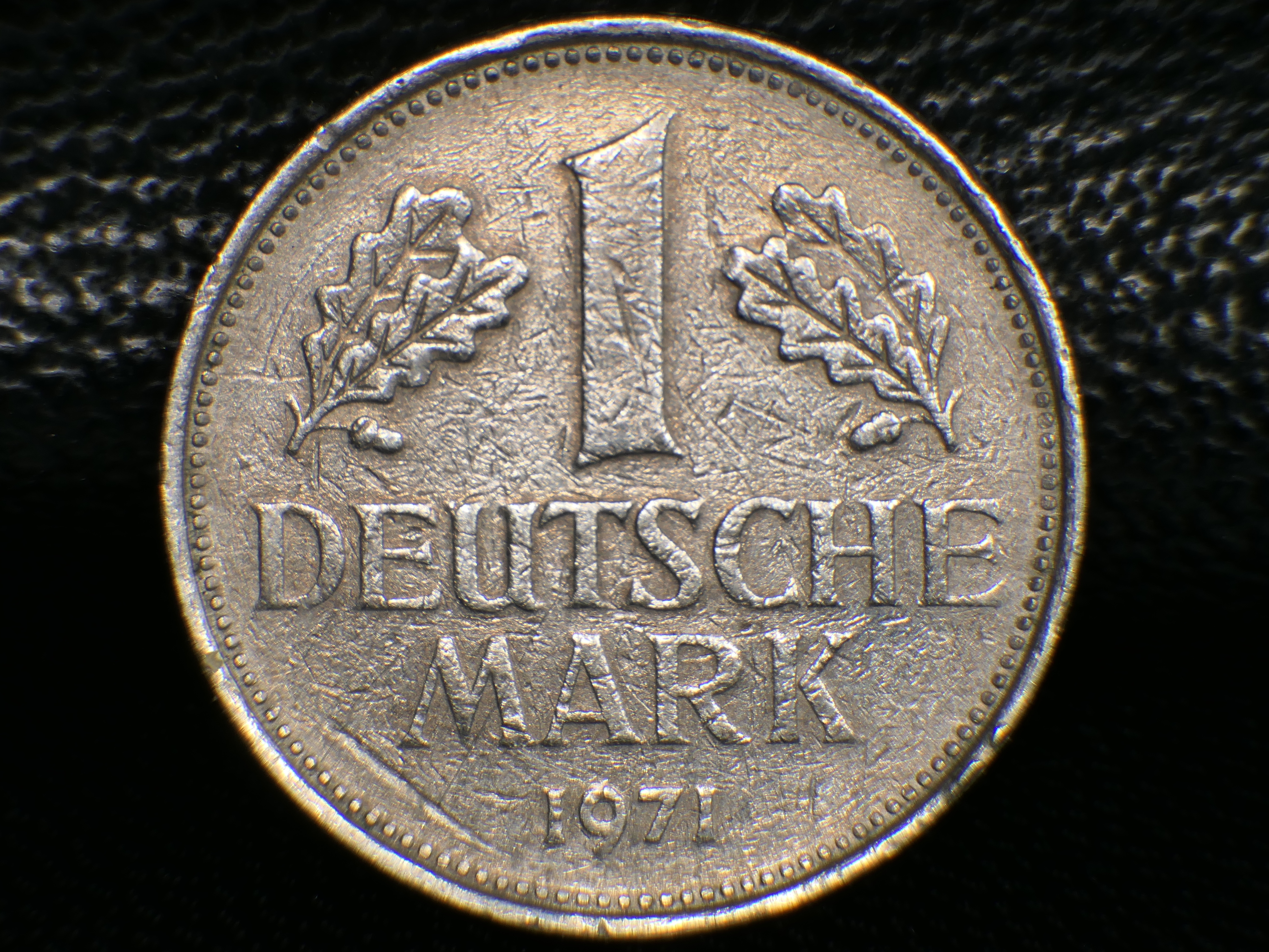
West German Deutsche Mark

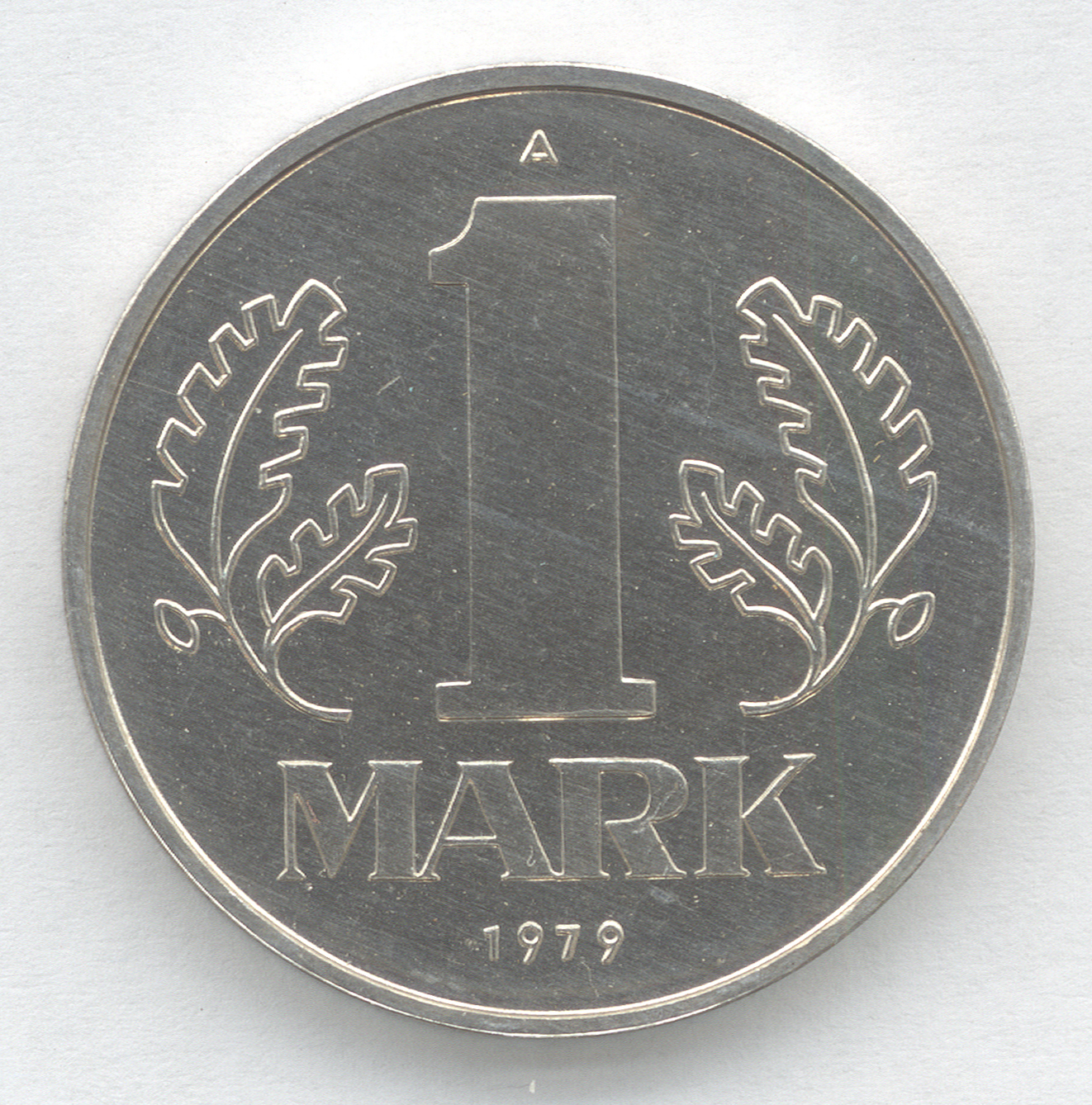
East German Mark

- East Germany quadrupled the amount of the foreign exchange that visitors from West Germany and other Western nations would have to pay when visiting the Communist nation. Previously, visitors had to exchange six West German Deutsche Marks (DM 6.00) at a 1:1 ratio for six East German Ostmarks (equivalent to roughly DM 1.36), and old-age pensioners were exempt. Effective October 13, all Western visitors had to convert DM 25 (worth US$14 at the time) to DDM 25 at the 1:1 ratio, even though the recognized commercial rate was 4.40 East German marks to a West German mark.
- British prime minister Margaret Thatcher delivered her famous "The lady's not for turning" speech after opponents within her Conservative Party asked her to change the government's economic policies. Responding to her critics, including former prime minister Edward Heath, to not avoid turning around on her policies, she said, "You turn if you want to. The lady's not for turning." The phrase, which earned her "a five-minute standing ovation" was a pun on the title of Christopher Fry's 1948 play The Lady's Not for Burning.
- Born: Sherine (Sherine Sayed Mohamed Abedl-wahab), Egyptian singer and TV actress; in Cairo
- Died: Billie Thomas, 69, African-American child actor known for portraying the character "Buckwheat" in the Little Rascals (Our Gang) short film comedies

== October 11, 1980 (Saturday) ==
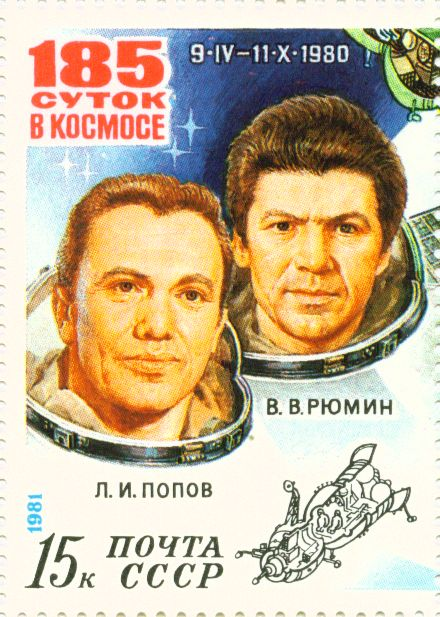
Soviet cosmonauts Popov and Ryumin

- Soviet cosmonauts Leonid Popov and Valery Ryumin returned to Earth at 2:50 p.m. local time (0950 UTC) after spending a record 185 days in orbit aboard the Salyut 6 space station. The pair, who had been launched on Soyuz 35 on April 9, landed in the Kazakh SSR in the Soyuz 37 capsule. On October 1, Popov and Ryumin had broken the endurance record for the longest time spent in outer space, breaking the record of 175 days and 35 minutes set by Ryumin's previous mission on Soyuz 32. In all, Ryumin's three missions made him the person with the most time in space, with 362 days. Leonid Popov and Valery Ryumin had been launched to the Salyut space station on April 9, remained for ten more days, returning to Earth in Soyuz 37 on October 11. Ryumin's two missions made him the person with the most time in space, with 360 days.
- Turkey's military government released most of the parliament members and former government officials that it had arrested after the September 12 overthrow of the government, including former prime minister Suleyman Demirel and his predecessor in office, Bülent Ecevit. Both had been detained in a place of exile in western Turkey in the beach resort town of Gelibolu. The government also released 61 other members of parliament who had been held for almost a month.
- The National Basketball Association's newest team, the Dallas Mavericks made their NBA debut by defeating the San Antonio Spurs (who had started out as the ABA's Dallas Chaparrals 103–92, before a crowd of 10,373 fans.

== October 12, 1980 (Sunday) ==
- The Philadelphia Phillies went to the World Series after defeating the Houston Astros in Game 5 of the best-of-five National League championship series. After nine innings, the game was tied, 7 to 7 and, like the previous three games in the NLCS, went into extra innings. Philadelphia won in the 10th inning, 8 to 7.
- Elections were held in the Ivory Coast, with an 82% turnout of voters. With no other choices than the only candidate, President Félix Houphouët-Boigny, a reported 2,795,150 people voted for him.
- Died: Alberto Demicheli, 84, figurehead President of Uruguay for less than three months in 1976 after being appointed, then fired, by the military government

== October 13, 1980 (Monday) ==
- The government of Cuba announced that it would release 33 American-born U.S. citizens who had been detained in Cuban prisons, including one hijacker imprisoned for 11 years and two hijackers who had spent almost eight years behind bars. After Southern Airways Flight 49 had been forced to land in Cuba on November 10, 1972, Melvin Cale and Louis Moore had been arrested as they got off of the plane. Cuba had no comment on Cuban-born U.S. citizens, whom the government of Fidel Castro considered to still be Cuban. On October 27, all but three of the prisoners opted to return to the United States. Anthony Bryant, who had spent 11 years in the Combinado del Easte prison after hijacking a National Airlines flight in 1969, elected to return to the U.S., commenting that "If the electric chair were waiting for me tomorrow, I'd return there today."
- Born: Ashanti (stage name for Ashanti Shequoiya Douglas), American R&B singer and actress; in Glen Cove, New York

== October 14, 1980 (Tuesday) ==
- At an airport in Diyarbakir in Turkey, national security forces stormed a hijacked Turkish Airlines Boeing 727 without loss of life. The 141 passengers included the five hijackers, who seized the airliner after it had departed for Ankara from Munich in West Germany the day before. During the day, the hijackers released 39 passengers but threatened to blow the plane up if their demands were not met. Two hijackers and 11 passengers were wounded in the rescue of the remaining 102 passengers and 7 crew. One of the passengers died the next day of his wounds.
- The Staggers Rail Act was signed into law by U.S. President Carter, deregulating the U.S. railroad industry. Among the changes were that for the first time, railroads could enter into long-term contracts for shipping without federal approval, and could raise rates (up to 6 percent) without seeking approval from the Interstate Commerce Commission. "By stripping away needless and costly regulation in favor of marketplace forces wherever possible," Carter said, "this act will help assure a strong and healthy future for our nation's railroads and the men and women who work for them."
- The 6th Congress of the Workers' Party ended, having anointed North Korean President Kim Sung-il's son Kim Jong-il as his successor.
- Born: Ben Whishaw, English film and TV actor, winner of two Emmy Awards and three BAFTA Awards; known for A Very English Scandal and The Hollow Crown, as well as for voicing the role of Paddington Bear in three films; in Clifton, Bedfordshire

== October 15, 1980 (Wednesday) ==
- In Belgium, the first regional parliament of Wallonia took office at the city of Namur, representing the 3.5 million French speaking citizens of the European kingdom who lived outside of the bilingual capital, Brussels. A similar parliament was set to take office to represent the 5.5 million speakers of Flemish.
- Born: Tom Boonen, Belgian professional bicycle racer and later sports car driver; in Mol, Antwerp province
- Died: Ladislas Farago, 74, Hungarian-born military historian

== October 16, 1980 (Thursday) ==
- By a vote of 139 to 18, the Parliament of Sri Lanka expelled former prime minister Sirimavo Bandaranaike and revoked her civil rights after determining that she had abused the power of her office.
- Former British prime minister James Callaghan announced his resignation as leader of the Labour Party.
- Born: Sue Bird, American women's pro basketball player and WNBA star; in Syosset, New York

== October 17, 1980 (Friday) ==
- U.S. president Carter signed an agreement on behalf of the United States, committing the U.S. to selling sufficient crude oil for Israel to meet its needs for 14 years, through the end of 1994.
- Luis Arce Gómez, chosen by Bolivia's military government to oversee the South American nation's internal security as the chief of the Interior Ministry, announced that all of Bolivia's political prisoners would be released over the next three weeks. At the time, estimates of the number of prisoners since the July coup d'état that brought General Luis García Meza to power, ranged from 500 to 1,000. Arce qualified his remarks by saying that while most prisoners would be released without restrictions, others would be restricted to living and working in "special areas" and that those considered most dangerous would be expelled from Bolivia.
- Born: Yekaterina Gamova, Russian volleyball player; in Chelyabinsk, Russian SFSR, Soviet Union

== October 18, 1980 (Saturday) ==
- In elections for Australia's House of Representatives, Malcolm Fraser's coalition of his Liberal Party and the National Country Party retained its majority, but lost a large number of seats. The coalition lost its control of the Australian Senate, with the Australian Democrats winning the balance of power.
- Former foreign minister Arnaldo Forlani became the new prime minister of Italy and formed a coalition government composed of 14 ministers from his Democrazia Cristiana government, seven Socialists, three Social Democrats and three Republicans. The formation of the coalition, whose parties combined for 405 of the 630 members of the Chamber of Deputies, resolved a 22-day long political crisis.
- Born: Natasha Rothwell, American actress and comedian known for The White Lotus; in Wichita, Kansas
- Died: Hans Ehard, 92, German politician who served as the Bavarian high court chief judge from 1933 to 1945, then later as minister president of the West Germany state of Bavaria from 1946 to 1954 and from 1960 to 1962

== October 19, 1980 (Sunday) ==
- Australia's largest diamond, the 95-carat Golconda d'Or, was stolen in Sydney in front of a crowd of about 80 people and a security guard, all of whom were unaware of what they were witnessing. The St John Ambulance Brigade, a charitable organization, was displaying the borrowed diamond at the Lower Town Hall as part of a fundraiser, the "Exhibit of Treasured Possessions", when two men and a woman walked in, casually opened the locked case on the pretense that they were fixing the locking mechanism, then removed the gem, substituted a glass replica, and left. As of 2020, the Golconda d'Or had not been located.

== October 20, 1980 (Monday) ==
- Greece rejoined the NATO military structure after an absence of six years. The cabinet of Prime Minister George Raflis voted unanimously in favor of the proposals of Raflis, Defense Minister Evangelos Averoff-Tostitsas and Foreign Minister Constantine Mitsotakis. Greece had dropped out of the alliance in 1974 after going to war with fellow NATO member Turkey, and returned after Turkey's government was replaced by a military junta.
- Somalia's President Mohamed Siad Barre declared a state of emergency in the northeast African nation. Barre also reinstated the Supreme Revolutionary Council of Somalian Army generals to assist in ruling the nation.
- In continuous production since 1962, the last MG MGB roadster rolled off the assembly line at the Abingdon-on-Thames (England) factory, ending production for the MG Cars marque.
- Kenya's President Daniel Arap Moi announced an amnesty and release from prison of 7,004 people who had been convicted and incarcerated for minor offenses, as part of the celebration of the Kenyatta Day holiday.

== October 21, 1980 (Tuesday) ==
- The Philadelphia Phillies of the National League won their first World Series ever in their 98-year history, defeating the Kansas City Royals 4 to 1, in Game Six of the best-of-7 championship of Major League Baseball. With the bases loaded and the Royals having the possibility to win the game and tie the Series with a grand slam home run, the Phillies' relief pitcher Tug McGraw struck out the Royals' Willie Wilson to end the game and to win the Series, 4 games to 2.
- Negotiations between the United States and Iran, aimed at getting Iran to release U.S. Embassy personnel who had been held hostage since November 4, were abruptly terminated by Iran without explanation. The U.S. House of Representatives would later investigate allegations that the campaign team for Republican nominee Ronald Reagan had met secretly between October 15 and October 20 with other representatives of the Iranian government to prevent the release of the U.S. hostages before the November 4 U.S. presidential election, giving rise to the term "October surprise". The American captives would be held for 91 additional days, and would be allowed to depart Iran on January 20, 1981, a few minutes after Reagan's taking of the oath of office as president.
- A 49-year-old Communist party secretary for Russian SFSR's Stavropol region, Mikhail S. Gorbachev, was promoted to become the youngest of the 14 full members of the Soviet Communist Party Politburo, filling the vacancy caused by the retirement of Aleksei Kosygin.
- The new Constitution of Chile, designed to give legal authority and broad powers to President Augusto Pinochet, was promulgated nationwide after being approved on September 11.
- Born: Kim Kardashian, American television series celebrity; in Los Angeles
- Died:
  - Hans Asperger, 74, Austrian pediatrician for whom Asperger's syndrome is named
  - Valko Chervenkov, 80, former General Secretary of the Bulgarian Communist Party (1949-1954) and Prime Minister of Bulgaria
  - Edelmiro Julián Farrell, 93, President of Argentina from 1944 to 1946

== October 22, 1980 (Wednesday) ==
- Voters in South Korea overwhelmingly approved the amendments to create a new constitution to replace the 1972 Yushin Constitution. With a reported turnout of 95.5% registered voters, 91.6% voted in favor and 8.4% voted against.
- After being told that they could not wear jerseys featuring the logos of their sponsors, players for the English soccer football teams Aston Villa and Brighton and Hove Albion refused to take the field, prompting a cancellation of the game, which had been scheduled for a broadcast on English television.

== October 23, 1980 (Thursday) ==
- Alexei Kosygin, who had served as the head of the Soviet government since 1964 in his capacity as Chairman of the Council of Ministers of the Soviet Union (equivalent to a prime minister), resigned for reasons of health. Kosygin, who had already resigned from the Communist Party Politburo, was succeeded by the First Deputy Premier, Nikolai A. Tikhonov. Although retirement because of illness was frequently used in Communist government statements when a leader was deposed, Kosygin actually was seriously ill. He died less than two months later, on December 18.
- A deadly explosion at the Marcelino Ugalde Primary School in the Spanish city of Ortuella killed 50 schoolchildren and 14 adults, and injured an additional 128 people at the school. A plumber, who had been called by the school to replace a water pipe beneath the school kitchen, admitted later that he had accidentally caused the explosion when he lit a match in order to warm the edges of the replacement pipe, unaware that there was a gas leak beneath the kitchen. He survived the blast with serious burns.
- Died:
  - Carlos Mancheno Cajas, 83, Ecuadorian politician who served for 14 days as acting President of Ecuador in September 1947
  - Tibor Rosenbaum, 56, Hungarian-born Swiss rabbi and businessman

== October 24, 1980 (Friday) ==

- At 6:30 p.m. Australian Eastern Daylight Time, broadcasting began for Australia's first public television network, the Special Broadcasting Service. (SBS)
- Iraq announced that it had eliminated the last pocket of resistance from Iranian defenders and that it had captured Khurramshahr, Iran's port on the Shatt al-Arab waterway at the confluence of the Tigris and Euphrates rivers.

== October 25, 1980 (Saturday) ==
- The U.S. cargo ship SS Poet and its 33-man crew disappeared in a storm in the North Atlantic east of Delaware Bay, one day after its departure from Cape Henlopen, Delaware for Port Said in Egypt with a shipment of corn. Scheduled to arrive in Egypt on November 9, the ship was reported missing on November 3. An air search was made by the U.S. Coast Guard over a 296,000 sq mi (770,000 km^{2}) area until 17 November and "No trace of the vessel, crewmen, or debris was ever found."
- Sun City, located in Bophuthatswana (a nominally independent nation (Bantustan) whose sovereignty was recognized only by South Africa) hosted its first racially mixed world heavyweight boxing championship fight between the World Boxing Association's heavyweight champion, African-American American Mike Weaver and white South African challenger Gerrie Coetzee. It was won by Weaver by a knockout in the 13th round.
- India's legislation to curtail deforestation of the nation's woodland areas, the Forest Conservation Act, 1980 went into effect. As of 2019, India has 275,000 square miles (710,000 km^{2}) of forest, mostly in the northeastern states.
- Shafik Wazzan formed a 22-member cabinet as the new prime minister of Lebanon
- Sir Keith Holyoake retired from his post of Governor-General of New Zealand after completion of a three-year term of office. Holyoake had been prime minister from 1960 to 1972, and was the first former premier to serve as the nation's governor-general.
- Died:
  - Virgil Fox, 68, American recording artist and organist
  - Sahir Ludhianvi (pen name for Abdul Hayee), 59, Indian poet and lyricist

== October 26, 1980 (Sunday) ==
- Voters in Tanzania turned out to elect the 264 members to the Bunge la Tanzania, the parliament of the East African nation and to vote on whether they approved of the government of President Julius Nyerere. Although all of the candidates were members of the Chama Cha Mapinduzi political party, voters in most districts had a choice between two CCM candidates for each seat. Nyerere received a 95.5% approval by voters, with 4.5% voting against him.
- Died:
  - Marcello Caetano, 74, Prime Minister of Portugal from 1968 to 1974
  - Víctor Galíndez, 31, Argentine professional boxer and the WBA light heavyweight world champion from 1974 until 1979 was killed during a race in the town of Veinticinco de Mayo in Argentina, along with his teammate, Antonio "Nito" Lizeviche. After their car broke down, they were off of the track and walking back to the pit when the car of another driver, Marcial Feijoo, spun out of control and ran over both of them.

== October 27, 1980 (Monday) ==
- South Korea's Fourth Republic came to an end along with the Yushin Constitution that had given authoritarian power to the late president Park Chung Hee. The revision of the entire constitution, creating the Fifth Republic, went into effect one year and one day after the October 26, 1979 assassination of President Park.
- Six Irish Republican Army (IRA) prisoners in Maze prison in Belfast, and one from a splinter group, the National Liberation Army, refused food and demanded status as political prisoners. The hunger strike, in which the prisoners only took liquids, would last for 53 days.
- Died:
  - John Hasbrouck Van Vleck, 81, American physicist and 1977 Nobel Prize laureate
  - Steve Peregrin Took, 31, English rock singer and songwriter for the group T-Rex, choked to death on a cherry while high on drugs

== October 28, 1980 (Tuesday) ==
- With seven days left before election day in the United States, U.S. president Jimmy Carter and former California Governor Ronald Reagan met in Cleveland for their only presidential debate. An estimated 80,600,000 U.S. viewers turned into watch the showdown, a record not exceeded until 2016. After Carter asserted that Governor Reagan opposed national health insurance, Reagan's response was "There you go again.", the best-remembered moment of the debate.
- Earlier in the day, U.S. Congressman and future budget director David Stockman spoke before a Rotary Club luncheon in Cassopolis, Michigan, and commented that the Reagan campaign had obtained a copy of President Carter's debate strategy, a matter that received mention in a small-town newspaper, but that would not be revealed until 1983.
- Joseph Paul Franklin, a serial killer and avowed racist, was arrested in Lakeland, Florida after three years of random murders. Before his capture, Franklin had killed 13 people in seven U.S. states. Many of his victims were interracial couples. Franklin would be executed by lethal injection on November 20, 2013.
- Born:
  - Christy Hemme, American female pro wrestler and later promoter as a WWE Diva; in Poway, California
  - Nadzeya Astapchuk, Olympic shot putter who won gold medals at the 2005 World Championships and the 2012 Olympics; the awards were later rescinded because of her use of performance-enhancing drugs; in Vialikija Arly, Stolin District of the Byelorussian SSR, Soviet Union

== October 29, 1980 (Wednesday) ==
- In "the first serious incident of terrorism in Peking (now Beijing) in many years" nine people were killed and 81 injured in a bomb blast at Beijing's central railroad station. The blast occurred during the 6:00 p.m. rush hour, and was believed to have been caused by a thrown bomb or grenade because there was no damage to the station floor, but shrapnel damage to walls and pillars. Police investigators later determined that the bomber (who was killed in the blast) was Wang Zhigang, a 29-year-old former Beijing resident who was frustrated over having been forcibly relocated to a rural province during the Cultural Revolution, and then denied his request to return home. Wang, who had carried nine pounds of dynamite into the station in a metal container, was only identified after police found his body and "were able to piece together sections of the man's head" from the remains.
- Died: Giorgio Borg Olivier, 69, Prime Minister of Malta from 1950 to 1955 and 1962 to 1971

== October 30, 1980 (Thursday) ==
- In a pivotal election, voters in Jamaica chose a new assembly, bringing an end to the government of Prime Minister Michael Manley and elevating opposition leader Edward Seaga to power as the Caribbean nation's new prime minister.
- El Salvador and Honduras signed a peace treaty to put the border dispute fought over in 1969's Football War before the International Court of Justice. Eleven years after the war the two nations signed a peace treaty in Lima, Peru on 30 October 1980 and agreed to resolve the border dispute over the Gulf of Fonseca and five sections of land boundary through the International Court of Justice (ICJ). In 1992, the Court awarded most of the disputed territory to Honduras, and in 1998, Honduras and El Salvador signed a border demarcation treaty to implement the terms of the ICJ decree.
- Ahmed Ben Bella, the first president of Algeria, was released from confinement after more than 15 years in prison. After the death of Houari Boumediene, the man who had overthrown his government on June 19, 1965, Ben Bella was moved from a three-room prison to exile under house arrest in the city of M'Sila. Ben Bella's release followed a pardon by Boumediene's successor, President Chadli Benjedid.
- Supernova SN 1980O of magnitude 17.0 was detected in NGC 1255 on October 30, 1980, by German astronomer Hans-Emil Schuster. NGC 1255 is a barred spiral galaxy approximately 69 million light-years away from Earth in the constellation of Fornax.
- Senator Harrison "Pete" Williams (D-N.J.) was indicted on October 30, 1980, and convicted on May 1, 1981, as part of Abscam.

== October 31, 1980 (Friday) ==
- A fire at a psychiatric hospital in the town of Górna Grupa killed 55 patients and injured 26 others.

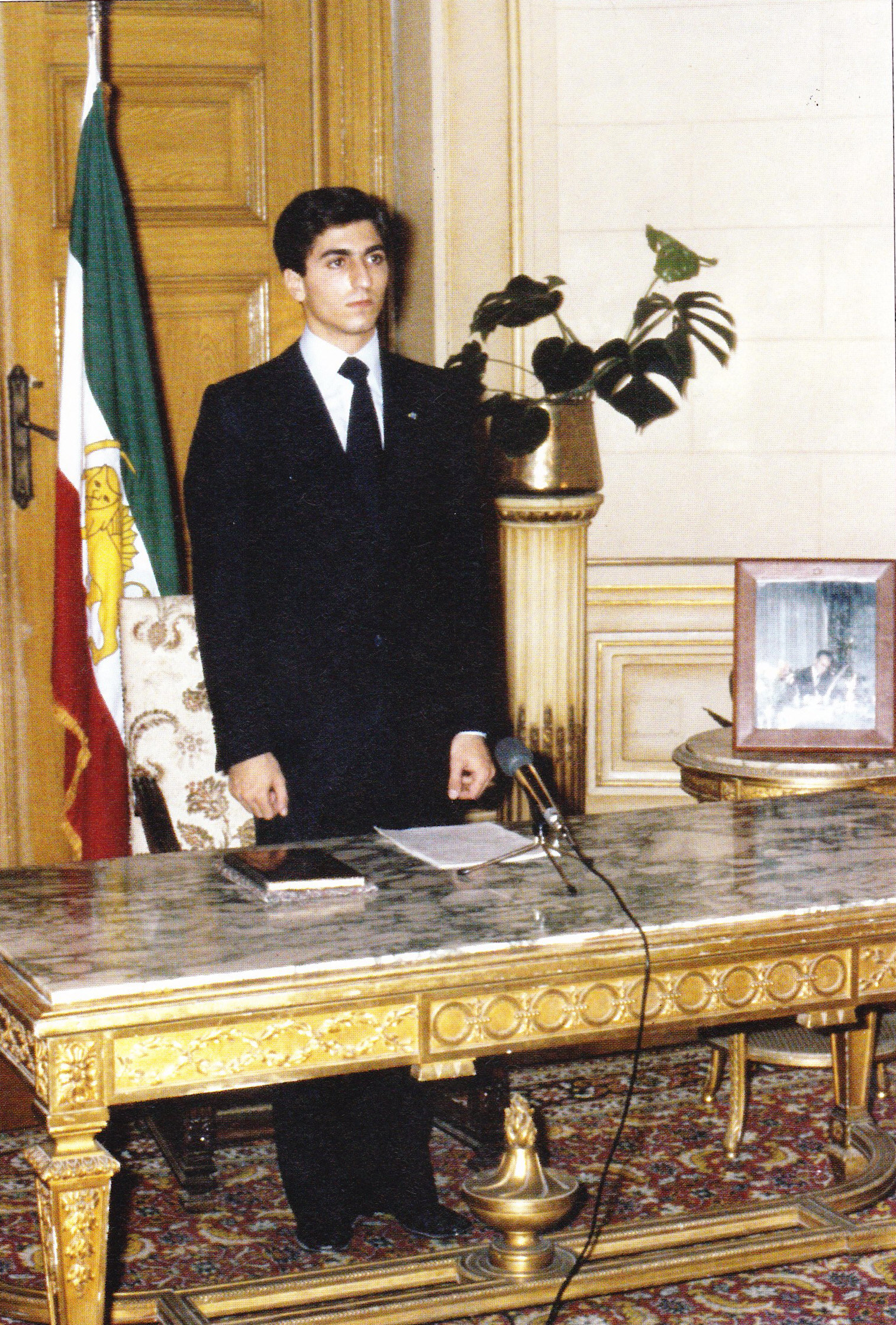
The man who would be king

- On his 20th birthday, Reza Pahlavi, the eldest son of the Shah of Iran, proclaimed himself "Shah Reza II" the rightful successor to the Peacock Throne. Speaking from the family's home in exile in Egypt, Reza, who had been the Crown Prince until the abolition of Iran's monarchy in 1979, delivered a 10-minute message in the Persian language at the Kubbeh Palace in Cairo said that he was acting in accordance with the abolished 1906 Imperial Constitution of Iran, which required a monarch to state his claim upon his 20th birthday. "I recognize that in the exceptional circumstances prevailing in my country," Reza stated, "the swearing-in cannot be held until, by the will of the Almighty, conditions are so changed as to make it possible," but said that he was declaring his readiness to accept full responsibilities as the lawful King of Iran.
- Iran's Minister of Petroleum, Mohammed Jawad Baqir Tunguyan, was taken as a prisoner of war in the Iran–Iraq War along with the Deputy Minister and four other officials, after a patrol of the Iraqi Army seized the group in an ambush near Abadan.
- Canadian Bank robbers Stephen Douglas Reid and Lionel James Wright of The Stopwatch Gang were arrested at a motel cabin at Sedona, Arizona, near Slide Rock State Park. Reid and Wright were taken into custody, but a third gang member, Patrick "Paddy" Mitchell, remained at large. They stole approximately $15 million—mainly in the 1970s and 1980s—from more than 140 banks and other sites across Canada and the United States.
- With the banner headline "Goodbye London", the final issue of London's afternoon paper The Evening News was published, closing out the newspaper less than eight months from the 100th anniversary of its founding on July 26, 1881. During the 1930s, it had been the world's largest selling afternoon newspaper, printing 1,700,000 issues daily during its peak.
- Brooks McCormick, descendant of Cyrus Hall McCormick, stepped down as the chairman of International Harvester's executive committee, ending almost 150 years of his family's active management in the company.
- Born: Eddie Kaye Thomas, American film and TV actor, on Staten Island, New York City
- Died:
  - Elizebeth Smith Friedman, 88, American cryptanalyst who teamed with her husband William F. Friedman to decode communications during the Prohibition era and later during World War II
  - Jan Werich, 75, Czech actor and playwright
