= List of shipwrecks in 1980 =

The list of shipwrecks in 1980 includes ships sunk, foundered, grounded, or otherwise lost during 1980.

table of contents
1980
Jan	Feb	Mar	Apr
May	Jun	Jul	Aug
Sep	Oct	Nov	Dec
Unknown date

== January ==
=== 1 January ===
List of shipwrecks: 1 January 1980
Ship	State	Description
Sea Shepherd I	United Kingdom	The anti-whaling ship, a former fishing trawler, was scuttled by her captain, Paul Watson, at Leixões, Portugal.

=== 12 January ===
List of shipwrecks: 12 January 1980
Ship	State	Description
HMCS St. Laurent	Canadian Forces Maritime Command	The decommissioned St. Laurent-class destroyer foundered in the Atlantic Ocean off Cape Hatteras, North Carolina, while under tow to breakers.

=== 15 January ===
List of shipwrecks: 15 January 1980
Ship	State	Description
Gemini	United States	The 198-gross register ton, 93.6-foot (28.5 m) crab-fishing vessel iced up, capsized, and sank in the Gulf of Alaska with the loss of two lives. A United States Coast Guard helicopter rescued her three survivors from a life raft approximately 150 nautical miles (280 km; 170 mi) southeast of Cold Bay, Alaska.

=== 17 January ===
List of shipwrecks: 17 January 1980
Ship	State	Description
Salem	Liberia	The supertanker was sunk by explosive charges in the Atlantic Ocean off Senegal in an insurance fraud scheme.

=== 18 January ===
List of shipwrecks: 18 January 1980
Ship	State	Description
Star Clipper	Norway	The bulk carrier collided with the Almö Bridge, Sweden, causing it to collapse.

=== 20 January ===
List of shipwrecks: 20 January 1980
Ship	State	Description
Athina B	Greece	Athina B ashore at Brighton The cargo ship was beached at Brighton, Sussex. Later declared a constructive total loss and scrapped.

=== 22 January ===
List of shipwrecks: 22 January 1980
Ship	State	Description
Deliverance	United States	The 40-foot (12.2 m) fishing vessel sank off Marmot Island in Alaska′s Kodiak Archipelago with the loss of two lives. There was one survivor.
Don Segundo Sombra	Argentina	The bulk carrier was wrecked at Punta Calendaria, Argentina whilst being towed to Bilbao, Spain for scrapping.

=== 28 January ===
List of shipwrecks: 28 January 1980
Ship	State	Description
USCGC Blackthorn	United States Coast Guard	The buoy tender sank after a collision with the tanker Capricorn (United States).
Kyriakoula III	Greece	Stranded off Chioggia, Italy (35°46′N 0°34′W) and damaged beyond economic repair.

=== 30 January ===
List of shipwrecks: 30 January 1980
Ship	State	Description
Lady Lee	United States	The 52-foot (15.8 m) fishing vessel sank in Kukak Bay (58°19′N 154°06′W) on the coast of Alaska on the west side of the Shelikof Strait. The fishing vessel Sharon W (United States) rescued her crew.

=== 31 January ===
List of shipwrecks: 31 January 1980
Ship	State	Description
Switha	United Kingdom	The Isles-class naval trawler ran aground outside Leith Harbour and was wrecked.

== February ==
=== 2 February ===
List of shipwrecks: 2 February 1980
Ship	State	Description
Tom and Al	United States	During a voyage from Kodiak to Homer, Alaska, with a cargo of shrimp and a crew of two, the 96-gross register ton, 84-foot (25.6 m) motor vessel sank with no loss of life 14 nautical miles (26 km; 16 mi) off the Barren Islands and 8 nautical miles (15 km; 9.2 mi) off Shuyak Island.

=== 6 February ===
List of shipwrecks: 6 February 1980
Ship	State	Description
Sierra	Cyprus	The whaler sank at Lisbon, Portugal following an onboard explosion.

=== 7 February ===
List of shipwrecks: 7 February 1980
Ship	State	Description
Pacific Trader	United States	The 110-foot (33.5 m) crab-fishing vessel capsized and sank in the Bering Sea north of Unimak Island in the Aleutian Islands with the loss of three crewmen. The fishing vessel Provider (United States) rescued her two survivors.

=== 14 February ===
List of shipwrecks: 14 February 1980
Ship	State	Description
Hosanna	Belgium	The fishing vessel departed from Plymouth, Devon, United Kingdom for a Dutch port. Subsequently foundered in the Strait of Dover with the loss of all hands.

=== 17 February ===
List of shipwrecks: 17 February 1980
Ship	State	Description
Oregon Dawn	United States	The 98-foot (29.9 m) crab-fishing vessel rolled on her starboard side in a gale and sank in the Gulf of Alaska approximately 2.5 nautical miles (4.6 km; 2.9 mi) south of Cape Tolstoi (55°22′20″N 161°28′00″W) near Pavlof Bay on the coast of Alaska. The fishing vessel Patience (United States) rescued all five members of her crew.

=== 23 February ===
List of shipwrecks: 23 February 1980
Ship	State	Description
Irenes Serenade	Greece	The tanker exploded and sank in the Bay of Pylos. Two crew reported missing.

== March ==
=== 1 March ===
List of shipwrecks: 1 March 1980
Ship	State	Description
USS Robert L. Wilson	United States Navy	The decommissioned Gearing-class destroyer was sunk as a target in the Harpoon missile testing program.

=== 7 March ===
List of shipwrecks: 7 March 1980
Ship	State	Description
Tanio	Madagascar	The tanker broke in two off Le Havre, France and was wrecked with the loss of eight of her 39 crew. The bow section capsized and sank, but the stern section was taken in tow by the tug Languedoc (France).

=== 10 March ===
List of shipwrecks: 10 March 1980
Ship	State	Description
USS Abatan	United States Navy	The decommissioned Pistil-class distilling ship was sunk as a target west of Guadeloupe.

=== 11 March ===
List of shipwrecks: 11 March 1980
Ship	State	Description
María Alejandra	Spain	While en route from Algeciras, Spain to Ras Tanura in the Persian Gulf on ballast, the crew was working to resolve a malfunction in the inert gas system; the tanker suddenly suffered a chain of four or five explosions over a few seconds, the hull rapidly broke in two and sank 100 nautical miles (190 km) off Nouadhibou, Mauritania. 36 people out of 43 aboard perished (34 Spanish and 2 British).

=== 12 March ===
List of shipwrecks: 12 March 1980
Ship	State	Description
Maurice Desagnes	Canada	The coaster sank at an unknown location.

=== 14 March ===
List of shipwrecks: 14 March 1980
Ship	State	Description
Viking IV	Norway	The ferry collided with a tug (United Kingdom), sinking the tug.

=== 15 March ===
List of shipwrecks: 15 March 1980
Ship	State	Description
Max	United States	The 95-foot (29.0 m) fishing trawler capsized off Green Island in Prince William Sound on the south-central coast of Alaska and was beached. A United States Coast Guard helicopter rescued her entire crew of five.

=== 17 March ===
List of shipwrecks: 17 March 1980
Ship	State	Description
Norel	United States	The crab-fishing vessel disappeared in the Gulf of Alaska near Cape Saint Elias, Alaska, with the loss of all three people – a woman and two men – on board.

=== 20 March ===
List of shipwrecks: 20 March 1980
Ship	State	Description
Mi Amigo	Netherlands	The vessel sank on the Long Sand Bank, North Sea (51°35′00″N 1°17′20″E).

=== 25 March ===
List of shipwrecks: 25 March 1980
Ship	State	Description
SAS Jan van Riebeeck	South African Navy	The decommissioned training ship, a former frigate, was sunk as a target 60 nautical miles (110 km; 69 mi) south of Cape Town, South Africa, by a Skerpioen missile fired from over the horizon by the fast attack craft SAS Jim Fouché (South African Navy) and by subsequent gunfire.

=== 27 March ===
List of shipwrecks: 27 March 1980
Ship	State	Description
Alexander L. Kielland	Norway	The semi-submersible drilling rig capsized and sank following the structural failure of one of its six legs, killing 123 people.
Maridi	Sudan	The cargo ship ran aground off Öland, Sweden. She was on a voyage from Oskarshamn, Sweden to Port Sudan. Refloated on 1 April but deemed beyond repair and subsequently scrapped.

=== 29 March ===
List of shipwrecks: 29 March 1980
Ship	State	Description
Capella	United States	Under tow by the tanker Alaska Standard (United States) after suffering damage to her rudder and lazarette when she struck a rock on 27 March, the 144-gross register ton, 72.6-foot (22.1 m) or 85-foot (25.9 m) crab-fishing vessel capsized and sank near King Cove, Alaska, between Deer Island and Fox Island. Four members of her crew perished; there was one survivor.

== April ==
=== 1 April ===
List of shipwrecks: 1 April 1980
Ship	State	Description
Albahaa B	Liberia	The tanker sank off the coast of Tanzania with the loss of six of her 43 crew.

=== 2 April ===
List of shipwrecks: 2 April 1980
Ship	State	Description
Cloverleaf	United States	The 60-foot (18.3 m) fishing trawler sank near the Alaska Peninsula in Alaska, 8 nautical miles (15 km; 9.2 mi) off Sutwik Island, with the loss of two lives. A United States Coast Guard C-130 Hercules aircraft spotted her sole survivor – her captain – clinging to a log on 3 April. The fishing vessels Bessie M and Rondys (both United States) rescued him.

=== 3 April ===
List of shipwrecks: 3 April 1980
Ship	State	Description
Mycene	Liberia	The tanker exploded and sank off the coast of Senegal with the loss of six of her 38 crew. Mycene was the sister ship of María Alejandra, lost in a similar incident less than one month before (see 11 March).

=== 16 April ===
List of shipwrecks: 16 April 1980
Ship	State	Description
Florence D	United States	The fishing vessel sank in Circle Bay (56°23′N 132°26′W) on the southwest coast of Woronkofski Island in the Alexander Archipelago in Southeast Alaska.

=== 19 April ===
List of shipwrecks: 19 April 1980
Ship	State	Description
Kivalina	unknown	The tug disappeared somewhere between Ketchikan, Alaska, and the Strait of Georgia on the coast of British Columbia, Canada.

=== 20 April ===
List of shipwrecks: 20 April 1980
Ship	State	Description
Altmark	West Germany	The cargo ship sank off the Netherlands with the loss of two of her crew.

=== 22 April ===
List of shipwrecks: 22 April 1980
Ship	State	Description
Don Juan	Philippines	The ferry collided with the tanker Tacloban City (Philippines) and sank with the loss of around 100 lives.

=== 27 April ===
List of shipwrecks: 27 April 1980
Ship	State	Description
K L (or K R)	United States	The fishing vessel sank off Southeast Alaska west of Cape Ommaney (56°10′00″N 134°40′20″W), Alaska. Her entire crew of 14 survived.

=== Unknown date ===
List of shipwrecks: Unknown date April 1980
Ship	State	Description
Yolanda	Cyprus	The cargo ship was wrecked on a reef off Ras Muhammad, Egypt.

== May ==
=== 1 May ===
List of shipwrecks: 1 May 1980
Ship	State	Description
Jeremiah	United States	The 42-foot (12.8 m) fishing vessel burned and sank 2 nautical miles (3.7 km; 2.3 mi) north of Tonki Cape (58°21′N 151°59′W) on the coast of Afognak Island in Alaska's Kodiak Archipelago. The Alaska Marine Highway System ferry Tustumena (United States) rescued her crew of two.

=== 3 May ===
List of shipwrecks: 3 May 1980
Ship	State	Description
Starwood	United States	The 31-foot (9.4 m) fishing vessel was swamped and sank near Kodiak, Alaska. The vessel Miss Stormy (United States) rescued her crew.

=== 9 May ===
List of shipwrecks: 9 May 1980
Ship	State	Description
Assab	Ethiopia	Eritrean War of Independence: The cargo ship was scuttled by the Eritrean Liberation Front after being captured in April.
Massawa	Ethiopia	Eritrean War of Independence: The cargo ship was scuttled by the Eritrean Liberation Front after being captured in April.
Summit Venture	Liberia	The cargo ship collided with the Sunshine Skyway Bridge in Tampa Bay between St. Petersburg and Terra Ceia, Florida, causing it to collapse and killing 35 people.

=== 11 May ===
List of shipwrecks: 11 May 1980
Ship	State	Description
HMBS Flamingo	Royal Bahamas Defence Force	The patrol boat was strafed by Cuban Air Force Mikoyan-Gurevich MiG-21 aircraft and sunk 40 nautical miles (74 km) south of Ragged Island, Bahamas. Four Bahamian Marines killed and three crewmen wounded. Surviving crewmen and eight captured Cuban fisherman sailed to Ragged Island on a confiscated Cuban fishing boat, Ferrocem 165.

=== 15 May ===
List of shipwrecks: 15 May 1980
Ship	State	Description
Ajax	United States	The fish tender was wrecked on Tongass Rock (54°47′N 130°44′W) just north of Tongass Island in Southeast Alaska. The cutter USCGC Cape Romain ( United States Coast Guard) rescued her crew of six.

=== 18 May ===
List of shipwrecks: 18 May 1980
Ship	State	Description
Frances K	United States	The 74-gross register ton, 67.2-foot (20.5 m) fishing vessel sank in the Gulf of Alaska approximately 25 nautical miles (46 km; 29 mi) south of Yakutat, Alaska. Her entire crew of four perished.

=== 22 May ===
List of shipwrecks: 22 May 1980
Ship	State	Description
Garmorar	Spain	Western Sahara War: The trawler was captured by Polisario fighters and intentionally run aground and wrecked on the coast of Western Sahara.
Zenlin Glory	Liberia	The cargo ships collided with another ship (West Germany) and sank in the Tsungaru Strait, Japan.

=== 29 May ===
List of shipwrecks: 29 May 1980
Ship	State	Description
Carol Jean	United States	The 107-foot (32.6 m) fishing vessel burned and sank 4 nautical miles (7.4 km; 4.6 mi) off Granite Cape (59°36′33″N 149°45′38″W) on the south-central coast of Alaska. The vessel Stardust (United States) rescued her entire crew of three.
Kayak	United States	The floating cannery vessel capsized and sank near Sea Ranger Reef (59°51′20″N 144°36′45″W) off the southwest end of Kayak Island off the south-central coast of Alaska after she suffered a steering failure during a storm and was driven onto rocks. Her crew of ten and cannery employees who were aboard her abandoned ship in her lifeboats and were rescued by the fishing vessel Aloha (United States).

== June ==
=== 4 June ===
List of shipwrecks: 4 June 1980
Ship	State	Description
Rio Vouga	Portugal	Western Sahara War: The trawler was captured by Polisario fighters. The trawler sank from damage sustained during the capture.

=== 6 June ===
List of shipwrecks: 6 June 1980
Ship	State	Description
USS John R. Craig	United States Navy	The decommissioned Gearing-class destroyer was sunk as a target in the Pacific Ocean off the coast of California.

=== 7 June ===
List of shipwrecks: 7 June 1980
Ship	State	Description
Zenobia	Sweden	The ro-ro ferry capsized and sank on her maiden voyage in Larnaka Bay Cyprus at 34°53.5′N 33°39.1′E after a computer fault that upset her ballast.

=== 14 June ===
List of shipwrecks: 14 June 1980
Ship	State	Description
Michael Lee	United States	The 93-foot (28.3 m) fishing vessel sank with the loss of one life near Clarks Point (58°50′30″N 158°33′00″W) in Nushagak Bay (58.6222°N 158.5911°W) on the Bristol Bay coast of Alaska. The fish processing ship Soyuz V (Soviet Union) rescued her four survivors.

== July ==
=== 4 July ===
List of shipwrecks: 4 July 1980
Ship	State	Description
Leonardo da Vinci	Italy	The out of service ocean liner caught fire and sank at La Spezia. Burnt out hulk later raised and scrapped.

=== 7 July ===
List of shipwrecks: 7 July
Ship	State	Description
Khalil	Lebanon	Lebanese Civil War: The coaster was damaged in combat operations. She was scuttled in the Bay of Jounieh on 8 September.

=== 27 July ===
List of shipwrecks: 27 July 1980
Ship	State	Description
USS Stribling	United States Navy	The decommissioned Gearing-class destroyer was sunk as a target.

=== 31 July ===
List of shipwrecks: 31 July 1980
Ship	State	Description
USS Duncan	United States Navy	The decommissioned Gearing-class destroyer was sunk as a target in the Pacific Ocean off California.
Margaret Jane	Canada	The trawler was involved in a collision with another trawler, Cape Beaver, and sank off Lunenburg, Nova Scotia.

== August ==
=== 1 August ===
List of shipwrecks: 1 August 1980
Ship	State	Description
Bellubera	Australia	The ferry was scuttled in the Tasman Sea off Long Reef, New South Wales, Australia, to create a recreational underwater diving site.
Shaktoolik	United States	The processing barge sank during a voyage between Dillingham and Kodiak, Alaska.

=== 17 August ===
List of shipwrecks: 17 August 1980
Ship	State	Description
Sea Tiger	United States	A storm destroyed the motor vessel at Pederson Point (58°46′15″N 157°03′45″W) northwest of Naknek, Alaska.

=== 27 August ===
List of shipwrecks: 27 August 1980
Ship	State	Description
Kathi R	United States	The motor vessel sank 8 nautical miles (15 km; 9.2 mi) off the Kekur Peninsula (56°23′N 134°56′W) on Baranof Island in the Alexander Archipelago in Southeast Alaska.

== September ==
=== 7 September ===
List of shipwrecks: 7 September 1980
Ship	State	Description
Neoga	United States	While beached at Halleck Point (57°13′45″N 135°30′45″W) in Southeast Alaska northwest of Sitka, Alaska, the tug was destroyed by a fire.

=== 9 September ===
List of shipwrecks: 9 September 1980
Ship	State	Description
Derbyshire	United Kingdom	Sunk due to structural failure in Typhoon Orchid south of Japan in the Pacific Ocean. All 44 people on board lost.

=== 20 September ===
List of shipwrecks: 20 September 1980
Ship	State	Description
Magnet	United States	The 36-foot (11.0 m) vessel sank in the vicinity of Spiridon Bay (57°40′N 153°52′W) on the south-central coast of Alaska.

=== 21 September ===
List of shipwrecks: 21 September 1980
Ship	State	Description
Unidentified missile boat	Iraqi Navy	Iran–Iraq War: A Project 205 (NATO reporting name "Osa-class") missile boat was sunk by an AS.12 air-to-surface missile fired by an Islamic Republic of Iran Air Force AB-212 helicopter.

=== 27 September ===
List of shipwrecks: 27 September 1980
Ship	State	Description
Pisces	United States	The sailboat sank in Resurrection Bay on the south-central coast of Alaska. The two people on board survived.

== October ==
=== 6 October ===
List of shipwrecks: 6 October 1980
Ship	State	Description
Due North	United States	The 58-foot (17.7 m) fishing vessel dragged her anchor and was stranded in Alitak Bay (56°50′N 154°10′W) on the southern end of Kodiak Island in Alaska′s Kodiak Archipelago.

=== 11 October ===
List of shipwrecks: 11 October 1980
Ship	State	Description
Prinsendam	Netherlands	Prinsendam The ocean liner caught fire and sank in the Gulf of Alaska south of Yakutat, Alaska.
Sea Fisher	United States	The 54-foot (16 m) fishing vessel ran aground in Terror Bay (57°46′N 153°12′W) on the coast of Kodiak Island. The vessel Cold Stream (United States) rescued her crew.

=== 17 October ===
List of shipwrecks: 17 October 1980
Ship	State	Description
Cherokee	United States	The fishing vessel sank in Behm Canal in Southeast Alaska with the loss of her captain. The tug Edith Olson (United States) rescued her other two crew members.

=== 18 October ===
List of shipwrecks: 18 October 1980
Ship	State	Description
Al-Hafifa	Iraq	Iran–Iraq War: The tanker was shelled and sunk by Iranian missile boats.
Al-Nasari	Iraq	Iran–Iraq War: The tanker was shelled and sunk by Iranian missile boats.
Al-Phirosh	Iraq	Iran–Iraq War: The tanker was shelled and sunk by Iranian missile boats.
Gelaninipirpasa	India	Iran–Iraq War: The tanker was shelled and sunk by Iranian missile boats.
Mehran	Islamic Republic of Iran Navy	Iran–Iraq War: The Iranian patrol boat was sunk by Iranian Air Force F-4 Phantom II aircraft.
Murlinda	Iraq	Iran–Iraq War: The tanker was shelled and sunk by Iranian missile boats.
Sufina Al-Umar	Iraq	Iran–Iraq War: The tanker was shelled and sunk by Iranian missile boats.
Tiran	Islamic Republic of Iran Navy	Iran–Iraq War: The Iranian patrol boat was sunk by Iranian Air Force F-4 Phantom II aircraft.

=== 22 October ===
List of shipwrecks: 22 October 1980
Ship	State	Description
Dan Prince	United States	While under tow, the oil-drilling platform sank in 16,000 feet (4,900 m) of water in the North Pacific Ocean approximately 300 nautical miles (560 km; 350 mi) southeast of Dutch Harbor, Alaska. All 18 people on board survived.

=== 25 October ===
List of shipwrecks: 25 October 1980
Ship	State	Description
Poet	United States	The U.S. cargo ship was last heard from on 24 October after it departed from Cape Henlopen, Delaware with a crew of 33 and a shipment of corn, scheduled to arrive on 9 November in Port Said in Egypt. Poet encountered a storm in the North Atlantic east of Delaware Bay on 25 October and was reported missing on 3 November. An air search was made by the U.S. Coast Guard over a 296,000 square miles (770,000 km^{2}) area until 17 November and "No trace of the vessel, crewmen, or debris was ever found."

=== 26 October ===
List of shipwrecks: 26 October 1980
Ship	State	Description
Gertrude Ann	United States	The vessel sank near Afognak Island in Alaska′s Kodiak Archipelago.

=== 31 October–1 November (overnight) ===
List of shipwrecks: 31 October 1980
Ship	State	Description
Eagle	United States	The 92-foot (28.0 m) crab-fishing vessel capsized and sank in the Bering Sea approximately 40 nautical miles (74 km; 46 mi) from the Pribilof Islands. Her crew abandoned ship in survival suits and was rescued by the fishing vessel Calista Sea (United States).

=== Unknown date ===
List of shipwrecks: Unknown date 1980
Ship	State	Description
Elbert Hubbard	United States	The Liberty ship was scuttled off Daytona Beach, Florida.
Panagiotis	Greece	The coaster ran aground on Zakynthos and was abandoned.

== November ==
=== 3 November ===
List of shipwrecks: 3 November 1980
Ship	State	Description
Alaska Mariner	United States	The 86-foot (26.2 m) motor scow fishing vessel burned and sank near Sitkalidak Island in Alaska′s Kodiak Archipelago. The fishing vessel Pacific Lady (United States) and a United States Coast Guard helicopter rescued her crew.

=== 4 November ===
List of shipwrecks: 4 November 1980
Ship	State	Description
Texas Gold	United States	The fishing vessel was destroyed by a fire while at anchor off Unimak Island in the Aleutian Islands. The fishing vessel Sea Wolf (United States) rescued all five members of her crew.

=== 11 November ===
List of shipwrecks: 11 November 1980
Ship	State	Description
USS Mindanao	United States Navy	The decommissioned Luzon-class internal combustion engine repair ship was sunk as an artificial reef off Daytona Beach, Florida, at 29°12.00′N 80°44.87′W, 11 miles (18 km) northeast of Ponce de León Inlet.

=== 13 November ===
List of shipwrecks: 13 November 1980
Ship	State	Description
U.S. Discovery II	United States	During an attempt on Lake Tahoe on the border between California and Nevada to break the world water speed record, the jet-powered hydroplane probably was traveling at close to the world-record speed of 318.60 miles per hour (512.74 km/h) when it disintegrated, killing its pilot, Lee Taylor, throwing debris 50 feet (15 m) into the air, and leaving a 200-foot (61 m) trail of wreckage.

=== 19 November ===
List of shipwrecks: 19 November 1980
Ship	State	Description
Tomi Maru No. 52	Japan	The fishing vessel sank with the loss of three lives in the North Pacific Ocean about 100 nautical miles (190 km; 120 mi) west of Adak Island after colliding with the fishing vessel Tomi Maru No. 51 (Japan).

=== 21 November ===
List of shipwrecks: 21 November 1980
Ship	State	Description
Commander	United States	The 114-gross register ton, 74.5-foot (22.7 m) fishing trawler disappeared during a voyage from Seattle, Washington, to Kodiak, Alaska. She was last seen in a gale with 30–35-foot (9.1–10.7 m) seas and 80-knot (150 km/h; 92 mph) winds in the Gulf of Alaska 30 nautical miles (56 km; 35 mi) off Cape Spencer on the south-central coast of Alaska. All four people aboard – members of the same family – were lost. Wreckage from Commander was found on the coast of Alaska 27 miles (43 km) south of Yakutat.

=== 23 November ===
List of shipwrecks: 23 November 1980
Ship	State	Description
Harp	United Kingdom	The 1,594 GRT merchant ship sank in the South Atlantic Ocean off Uruguay, during a storm.

=== 26 November ===
List of shipwrecks: 26 November 1980
Ship	State	Description
Mary Jane	United States	The crab-fishing vessel ran aground in Unalga Pass (53°58′N 166°14′W) in the Aleutian Islands between Unalaska Island and Unalga Island. Her crew abandoned ship in survival suits and was rescued from the beach on 27 November by the fishing vessel Advancer (United States).

=== 29 November ===
List of shipwrecks: 29 November 1980
Ship	State	Description
Paykan	Islamic Republic of Iran Navy	Iran–Iraq War: Operation Morvarid: The Iranian patrol boat was sunk by missiles from Iraqi warships.
Two unidentified missile boats	Iraqi Navy	Iran–Iraq War: Operation Morvarid: Two unidentified missile boats were sunk by Islamic Republic of Iran Air Force F-4 Phantom II aircraft.

== December ==
=== 1 December ===
List of shipwrecks: 1 December 1980
Ship	State	Description
Dauntless	United States	On her maiden voyage, the 73-gross register ton, 48.9-foot (14.9 m) or 58-foot (17.7 m) limit seiner was wrecked without loss of life at Ulakta Head (53°55′35″N 166°30′45″W) on Amaknak Island in the Aleutian Islands just north of Dutch Harbor, Alaska. Most of her wreck was salvaged or scrapped in situ.
Unidentified infiltration vessel	Korean People's Navy	An infiltration vessel was sunk by a South Korean Army amphibious ship. Nine North Korean agents aboard were killed.

=== 15 December ===
List of shipwrecks: 15 December 1980
Ship	State	Description
LNG Taurus	United States	The liquified natural gas carrier ran aground off the west coast of Japan. Her captain committed suicide.

=== 18 December ===
List of shipwrecks: 18 December 1980
Ship	State	Description
Bamenda Palm	United Kingdom	The cargo ship accidentally rammed a Romanian fish factory ship in Carrick Roads, Falouth, Cornwall, England, in a Force 9 southerly gale. The anchorage was very crowded with many vessels sheltering from the storm. A major disaster was averted because her bulbous bow punctured the fishing vessel in the fish hold. After five days of repairs, Bamenda Palm was seaworthy enough to continue her voyage to West Africa.

=== 19 December ===
List of shipwrecks: 19 December 1980
Ship	State	Description
Ross Khartoum	United Kingdom	The 163-foot (50 m), 506-ton oil field standby (safety) vessel, a former trawler, ran aground on a beach 8 miles (13 km) north of Aberdeen. Scrapped in place in 1981.

== Unknown date ==
List of shipwrecks: Unknown date 1980
Ship	State	Description
Eva V	United Kingdom	The motor vessel struck the Pierre Vertes off Ushant, France.
Fleetwood Lady	United Kingdom	The 85-foot (26 m) fishing vessel stranded at Baths Beach, Peel sometime in 1980. refloated and returned to service.
King James	United States	The fishing vessel was found abandoned near the Egg Islands in the Copper River Delta on the south-central coast of Alaska. The only person who had been aboard was never found.
