= NGC 1255 =

Galaxy in the constellation Fornax

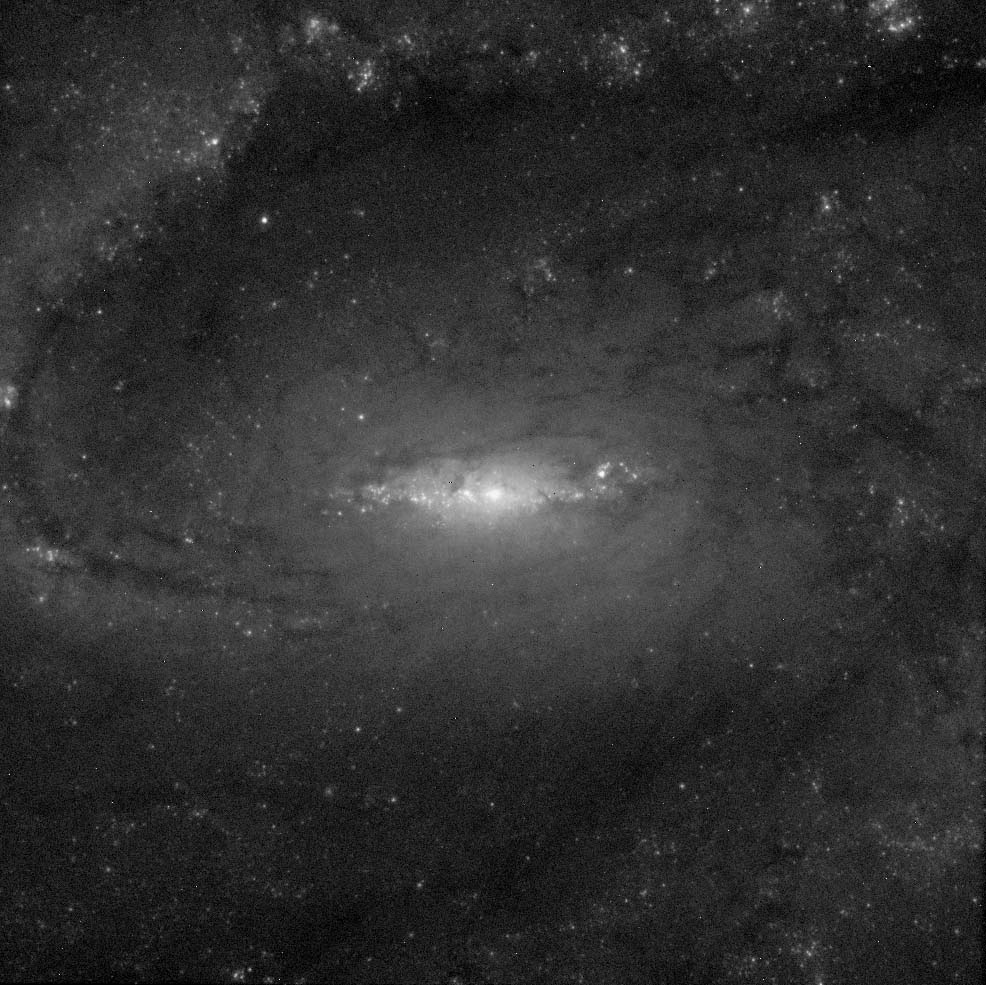
- The nucleus of NGC 1255 imaged by the Hubble Space Telescope

Observation data (J2000.0 epoch)
- Constellation: Fornax
- Right ascension: 03^{h} 13^{m} 32.04^{s}
- Declination: −25° 43′ 30.60″
- Redshift: 0.005624
- Heliocentric radial velocity: 1686 ± 3 km/s
- Distance: 69 Mly
- Group or cluster: NGC 1255 group (LGG 86)
- Apparent magnitude (V): 10.7
- Apparent magnitude (B): 11.5

Characteristics
- Type: SBbc
- Apparent size (V): 4.2 x 2.6

Other designations
- PGC 12007, UGCA 60, AM 0311-255, MCG -4-8-50, ESO 481-13

NGC 1255 is a barred spiral galaxy approximately 69 million light-years away from Earth in the constellation of Fornax.

== Observational history ==
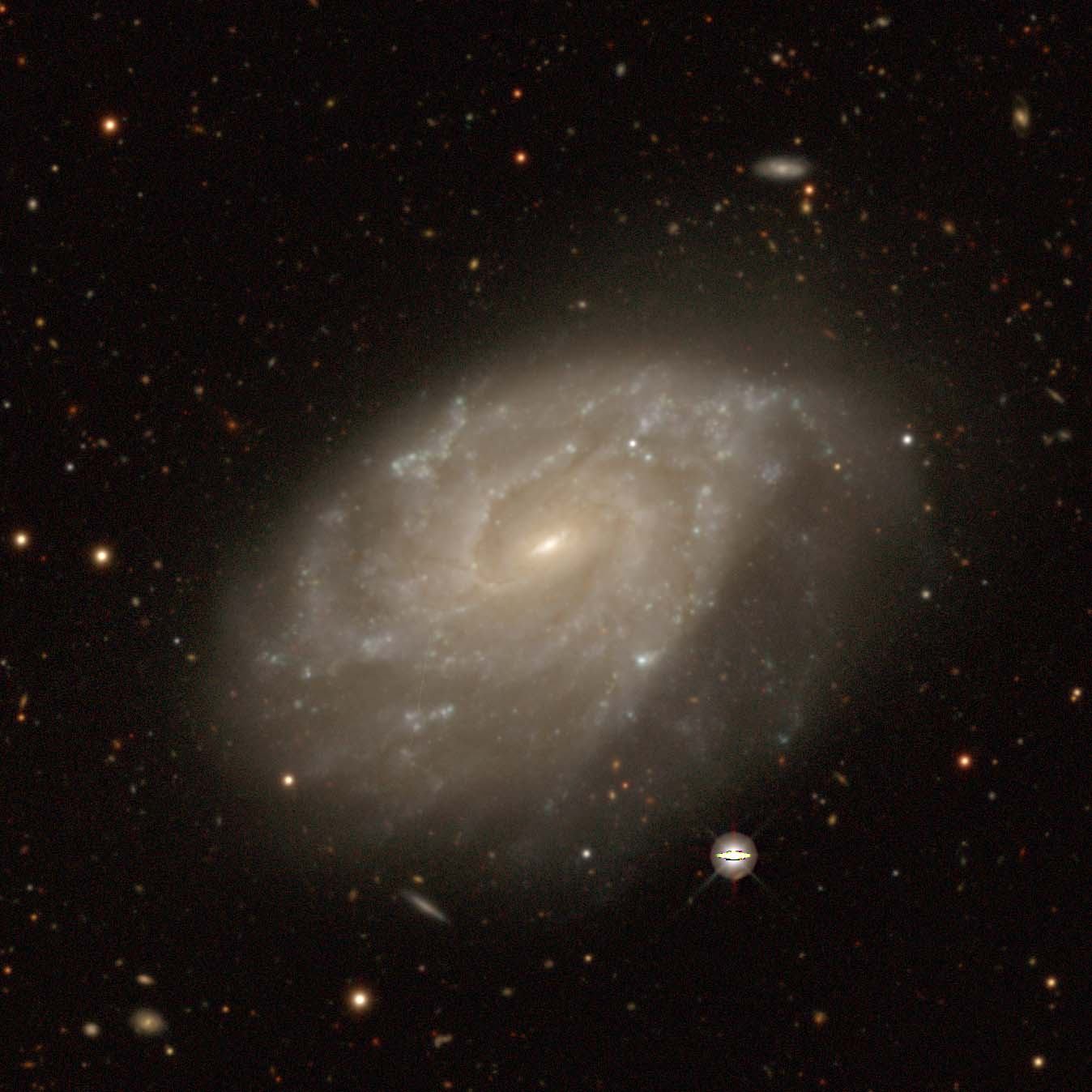
NGC 1255 (legacy surveys)

NGC 1255 was discovered by American astronomer Edward Emerson Barnard on August 30, 1883 with the 6-inch refractor at Vanderbilt University. He described it as a "faint nebula, not large, pretty even in light. A faint star close p and slightly south probably involved. Star is s and f the nebula by about 30'". American astronomer Ormond Stone made an independent discovery in 1886 with the 26" refractor at Leander McCormick Observatory, recording "4.1'x2.0', PA 315°".

== NGC 1255 group ==
NGC 1255 is the namesake of the NGC 1255 group (also known as LGG 86), which contains at least 5 galaxies, including NGC 1201, NGC 1302, UGCA 61, and UGCA 64.

== Supernovae ==
Two supernovae have been observed in NGC 1255:

- SN 1980O (Type II, mag. 17) was discovered by German astronomer Hans-Emil Schuster with the 1.0-m Schmidt telescope on October 30, 1980. The supernova was located at the following coordinates: RA 03h 13m 27s, Dec -25° 44.50′ (J2000 epoch). By December 30, 1980 the supernova had faded by about 4 magnitudes and showed strong P-Cyg-type profiles.
- SN 2022ame (Type II, mag. 17.3), was discovered by Kōichi Itagaki on January 27, 2022.

== See also ==
- Types and morphology of galaxies
- Classification of supernovae
- List of NGC objects (1001–2000)
