= 3288 Seleucus =

Near-Earth asteroid

Discovery
- Discovered by: H.-E. Schuster
- Discovery site: La Silla Obs.
- Discovery date: 28 February 1982

Designations
- Pronunciation: /sɪˈluːkəs/
- Named after: Seleucus I Nicator (Seleucid Empire)
- Alternative designations: 1982 DV
- Minor planet category: Amor · NEO

Orbital characteristics
- Epoch 4 September 2017 (JD 2458000.5)
- Uncertainty parameter 0
- Observation arc: 35.34 yr (12,907 days)
- Aphelion: 2.9605 AU
- Perihelion: 1.1053 AU
- Semi-major axis: 2.0329 AU
- Eccentricity: 0.4563
- Orbital period (sidereal): 2.90 yr (1,059 days)
- Mean anomaly: 77.175°
- Mean motion: 0° 20^{m} 24^{s} / day
- Inclination: 5.9306°
- Longitude of ascending node: 218.65°
- Argument of perihelion: 349.29°
- Earth MOID: 0.1029 AU · 40.1 LD

Physical characteristics
- Dimensions: 2.2 km 2.49±0.07 km 2.8 km (Gehrels); 2.832±1.100 km
- Synodic rotation period: 16 h (dated); 75±5 h 75 h
- Geometric albedo: 0.139±0.127; 0.22 (Gehrels); 0.23; 0.24±0.04
- Spectral type: S (Tholen) · K (SMASS) · S B–V = 0.910; U–B = 0.500
- Absolute magnitude (H): 15.2 · 15.3 · 15.5 · 15.50±0.3 · 15.6±0.3

3288 Seleucus, provisional designation 1982 DV, is a rare-type stony asteroid, classified as near-Earth object of the Amor group of asteroids, approximately 2.5 kilometers in diameter. It was discovered on 28 February 1982, by German astronomer Hans-Emil Schuster at ESO's La Silla Observatory site in northern Chile. It was named after the Hellenistic general and Seleucid ruler Seleucus I Nicator.

== Orbit ==
Seleucus orbits the Sun in the inner main-belt at a distance of 1.1–3.0 AU once every 2 years and 11 months (1,059 days). Its orbit has an eccentricity of 0.46 and an inclination of 6° with respect to the ecliptic. Seleucus has an Earth minimum orbital intersection distance of 0.1029 AU (15,400,000 km), which corresponds to 40.1 lunar distances. As no precoveries were taken, and no prior identifications were made, the body's observation arc begins with its official discovery observation at La Silla.

== Physical parameters ==
=== Spectral type ===
On the Tholen and SMASS taxonomic scheme, Seleucus is classified as a featureless S-type and rare K-type asteroid, respectively.

=== Rotation period ===
It has a relatively long rotation period of 75 hours with a brightness variation of 1.0 magnitude, indicative of a non-spheroidal shape (U=3/3). While most minor planets have spin rate between 2 and 20 hours, Seleucus still rotates faster than a typical slow rotator, which have periods above 100 hours.

=== Diameter and albedo ===
According to the survey carried out by NASA's Wide-field Infrared Survey Explorer with its subsequent NEOWISE mission, Seleucus measures 2.49 and 2.83 kilometers in diameter, and its surface has an albedo of 0.139 and 0.24, respectively. The Collaborative Asteroid Lightcurve Link adopts an albedo of 0.23 and a diameter of 2.2 kilometers, based on modeled data by Alan Harris.

== Naming ==
This minor planet is named for Seleucus I Nicator, a general in the army of Alexander the Great, and, after the death of Alexander, founder and king of the Seleucid Empire. The approved naming citation was published by the Minor Planet Center on 29 September 1985 (M.P.C. 10046).

== See also ==
- Seleucus (crater), a lunar crater
