= 2608 Seneca =

Stony asteroid and sub-kilometer near-Earth object

Discovery
- Discovered by: H.-E. Schuster
- Discovery site: La Silla Obs.
- Discovery date: 17 February 1978

Designations
- Pronunciation: /ˈsɛnɪkə/ SEN-ik-ə
- Named after: Seneca the Younger (Roman philosopher)
- Alternative designations: 1978 DA
- Minor planet category: NEO · Amor

Orbital characteristics
- Epoch 4 September 2017 (JD 2458000.5)
- Uncertainty parameter 1
- Observation arc: 38.92 yr (14,217 days)
- Aphelion: 3.9532 AU
- Perihelion: 1.0777 AU
- Semi-major axis: 2.5154 AU
- Eccentricity: 0.5716
- Orbital period (sidereal): 3.99 yr (1,457 days)
- Mean anomaly: 353.12°
- Mean motion: 0° 14^{m} 49.56^{s} / day
- Inclination: 14.682°
- Longitude of ascending node: 167.37°
- Argument of perihelion: 37.350°
- Earth MOID: 0.1321 AU · 51.5 LD

Physical characteristics
- Dimensions: 0.9 km 1.0±0.3
- Synodic rotation period: 8 h
- Geometric albedo: 0.15±0.03; 0.20 (derived); 0.21
- Spectral type: Tholen = S · S B–V = 0.826; U–B = 0.454
- Absolute magnitude (H): 17.52 · 17.59 · 17.73

2608 Seneca, provisional designation 1978 DA, is a stony asteroid and sub-kilometer near-Earth object of the Amor group, approximately 0.9 kilometers in diameter. It was discovered on 17 February 1978, by German astronomer Hans-Emil Schuster at ESO's La Silla Observatory in northern Chile, and named after Roman philosopher Seneca.

== Orbit ==
Seneca orbits the Sun at a distance of 1.1–4.0 AU once every 3 years and 12 months (1,457 days). Its orbit has an eccentricity of 0.57 and an inclination of 15° with respect to the ecliptic.

The body's observation arc begins with its official discovery observation in 1978, as no precoveries were taken, and no prior identifications were made.

=== Close approaches ===
Seneca has an Earth minimum orbital intersection distance of 0.1321 AU (19,800,000 km), which corresponds to 51.5 lunar distances. On 22 March 2062, it will pass 0.254 AU (38,000,000 km) from the Earth.

== Physical characteristics ==
In the Tholen taxonomy, Seneca is a stony S-type asteroid.

=== Photometry ===
In March 1978, a photometric observations taken by Degewij and Lebofsky at the Lunar and Planetary Laboratory, Arizona, using a 154-cm reflector, gave a rotational lightcurve with a rotation period of 8 hours and a brightness amplitude of 0.4 (0.5) magnitude (U=2).

=== Radiometry ===
In addition, radiometric observations by L. and M. Lebofsky with the 71-cm reflector gave a mean-diameter of 1.0±0.3 kilometers and albedo of 0.15±0.03.

=== Diameter and albedo ===
The Minor Planet Center classifies Seneca as an object larger than 1 kilometer ("1+ KM Near-Earth Object"), while Collaborative Asteroid Lightcurve Link derives an albedo of 0.20 and a diameter of 0.9 kilometers based on an absolute magnitude of 17.59. In 1994, astronomer Tom Gehrels published a diameter of 0.9 kilometers with an albedo of 0.21 in his Hazards Due to Comets and Asteroids.

== Naming ==
This minor planet was named after Roman philosopher and statesman Lucius Annaeus Seneca (c. 4 BC – AD 65), also known as "Seneca the Younger" or simply "Seneca". The approved naming citation was published by the Minor Planet Center on 8 April 1982 (M.P.C. 6835). The lunar crater Seneca was also named in his honor.
