= 161989 Cacus =

Near-Earth asteroid in 1941/2022

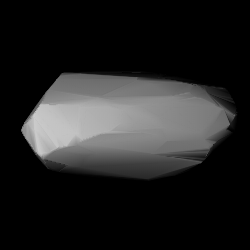
- Shape model of Cacus from its lightcurve

Discovery
- Discovered by: H.-E. Schuster
- Discovery site: La Silla Obs.
- Discovery date: 8 February 1978

Designations
- Pronunciation: /ˈkeɪkəs/
- Named after: Cacus (Roman mythology)
- Alternative designations: 1978 CA
- Minor planet category: Apollo · NEO · PHA

Orbital characteristics
- Epoch 4 September 2017 (JD 2458000.5)
- Uncertainty parameter 0
- Observation arc: 38.59 yr (14,096 days)
- Aphelion: 1.3634 AU
- Perihelion: 0.8828 AU
- Semi-major axis: 1.1231 AU
- Eccentricity: 0.2140
- Orbital period (sidereal): 1.19 yr (435 days)
- Mean anomaly: 345.40°
- Mean motion: 0° 49^{m} 41.16^{s} / day
- Inclination: 26.060°
- Longitude of ascending node: 161.24°
- Argument of perihelion: 102.16°
- Earth MOID: 0.0152 AU · 5.9 LD

Physical characteristics
- Mean diameter: 0.64±0.02 km 1.126±0.073 km 1.86 km 1.9 km
- Synodic rotation period: 3.7538±0.0019 h 3.756 h 3.761 h 3.77±0.11 h
- Geometric albedo: 0.09; 0.119 (derived); 0.199±0.052; 0.46±0.09
- Spectral type: Tholen = S · Q B–V = 0.910; U–B = 0.484
- Absolute magnitude (H): 16.58 · 17.1 · 17.2 · 17.32 · 17.43

161989 Cacus (provisional designation: 1978 CA) is a stony asteroid, classified as a near-Earth object and a potentially hazardous asteroid of the Apollo group, approximately 1 kilometer in diameter. It was discovered on 8 February 1978, by German astronomer Hans-Emil Schuster at ESO's La Silla Observatory in northern Chile. Its orbit is confined between Venus and Mars.

This minor planet was named from Roman mythology, after Cacus, a fire-breathing monster, which was killed by Hercules. The official naming citation was published by the Minor Planet Center on 24 November 2007 (M.P.C. 61270).

Close approaches
Date	JPL SBDB nominal geocentric distance	uncertainty region (3-sigma)
1941-09-02	2418754 km	± 6 km
2022-09-01	8607710 km	± 21 km
