= NGC 1201 =

Galaxy in the constellation Fornax

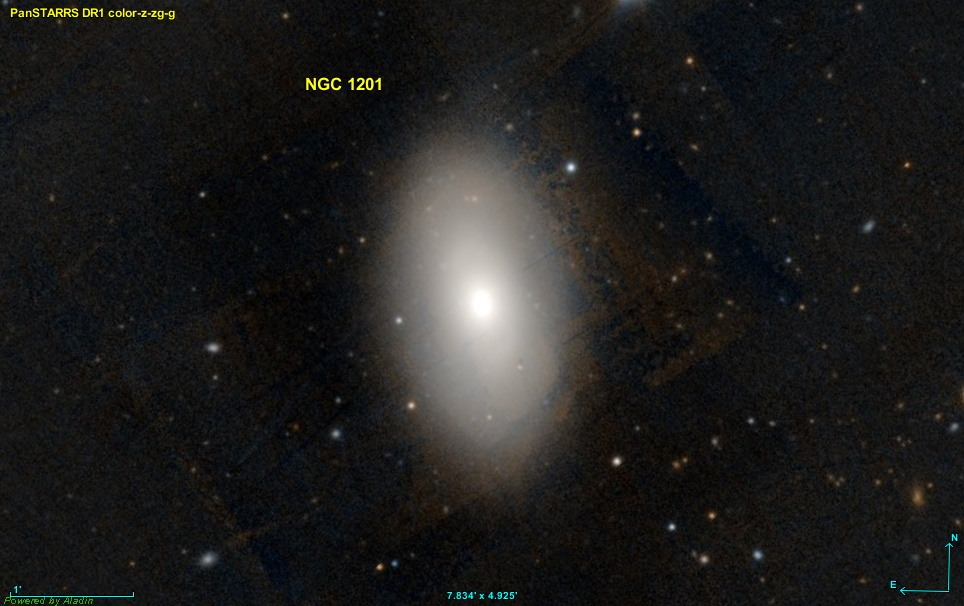
- NGC 1201 imaged by Pan-STARRS

Observation data (J2000 epoch)
- Constellation: Fornax
- Right ascension: 03^{h} 04^{m} 07.9884^{s}
- Declination: −26° 04′ 10.815″
- Redshift: 0.005624±0.0000370
- Heliocentric radial velocity: 1,686±11 km/s
- Distance: 63.37 ± 4.96 Mly (19.430 ± 1.520 Mpc)
- Group or cluster: NGC 1255 Group (LGG 86)
- Apparent magnitude (V): 12.20

Characteristics
- Type: SA0^0(r)
- Size: ~93,900 ly (28.80 kpc) (estimated)
- Apparent size (V): 3.6′ × 2.1′

Other designations
- ESO 480- G 028, 2MASX J03040796-2604105, MCG -04-08-023, PGC 11559

NGC 1201 is a lenticular galaxy in the constellation of Fornax. Its velocity with respect to the cosmic microwave background is 1,531±16 km/s, which corresponds to a Hubble distance of 73.6 ± 5.3 Mly (22.58 ± 1.61 Mpc). However, 10 non-redshift measurements give a closer mean distance of 63.37 ± 4.96 Mly (19.430 ± 1.520 Mpc). It was discovered by German-British astronomer William Herschel on 26 October 1785.

NGC 1201 has a possible active galactic nucleus, i.e. it has a compact region at the center of a galaxy that emits a significant amount of energy across the electromagnetic spectrum, with characteristics indicating that this luminosity is not produced by the stars.

== NGC 1255 group ==
NGC 1201 is a member of the NGC 1255 group (also known as LGG 86), which contains at least 5 galaxies, including NGC 1255, NGC 1302, UGCA 61, and UGCA 64.

== Supernova ==
One supernova has been observed in NGC 1201:

- SN 2003hv (Type Ia, mag. 12.5) was discovered by LOTOSS (Lick Observatory and Tenagra Observatory Supernova Searches) on 2 April 2003. It reached magnitude 12.3, making it the brightest supernova of 2003.

== See also ==
- List of NGC objects (1001–2000)
