= Yolanda (ship) =

Cypriot cargo ship-wreck

Coordinates: 27°43′24″N 34°15′36″E

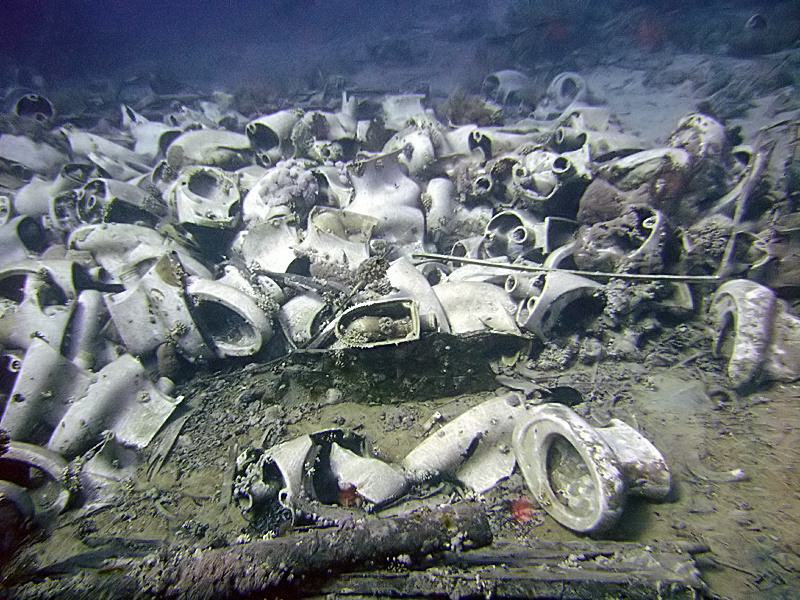
- Toilets in the wreck of Yolanda

History
- Name: Jolanda (or Yolanda)
- Owner: Rennies Coasters, Durban (1966–1977); Sea Brother Marine Shipping Co., Cyprus (1977–1980)
- Port of registry: Cyprus
- Builder: Juliana Constructora Gijonesa, Gijón, Spain
- Launched: 1964
- Out of service: 1 April 1980
- Identification: IMO number: 5405645
- Fate: Ran aground on a reef at Ras Muhammad

General characteristics
- Type: Cargo ship
- Tonnage: 1,153 GT; 1,176 GRT; 1,907 DWT
- Propulsion: Single screw

Jolanda (also called Yolanda) was a Cypriot cargo ship built in 1964 in Gijón, Spain by SA Juliana Constructora. She was grounded on a reef at Ras Muhammad on 1 April 1980. From 1981 to 1985, the wreck was a popular dive site, but it was lost when it fell off the reef during a storm in March 1987. The wreck remained lost for 20 years until it was rediscovered by Leigh Cunningham and Mark Andrews at a depth of 145–160 metres (476–525 ft) in 2005. Today, cargo from the wreckage, including British toilets, bath tubs and pipes, is visited by recreational divers.

== Pictures of the wreck ==
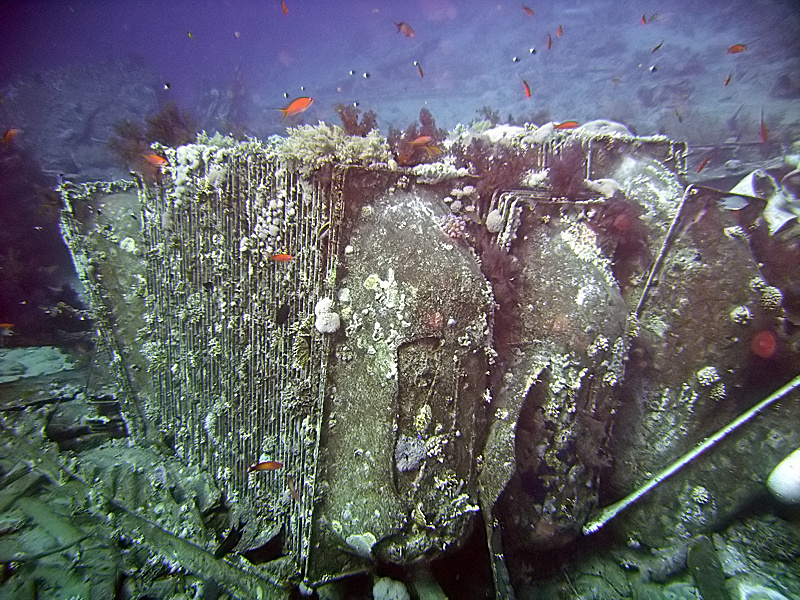
Stacks of bathtub

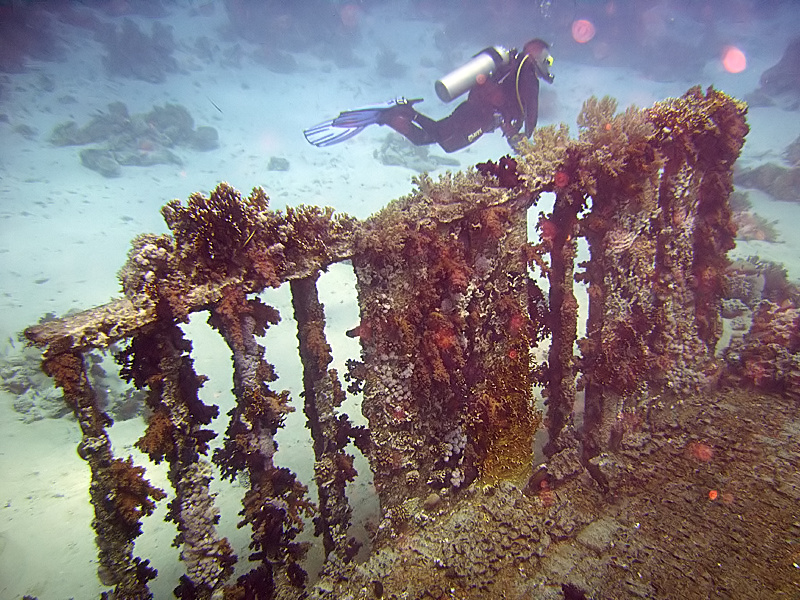
Remains of the wreck

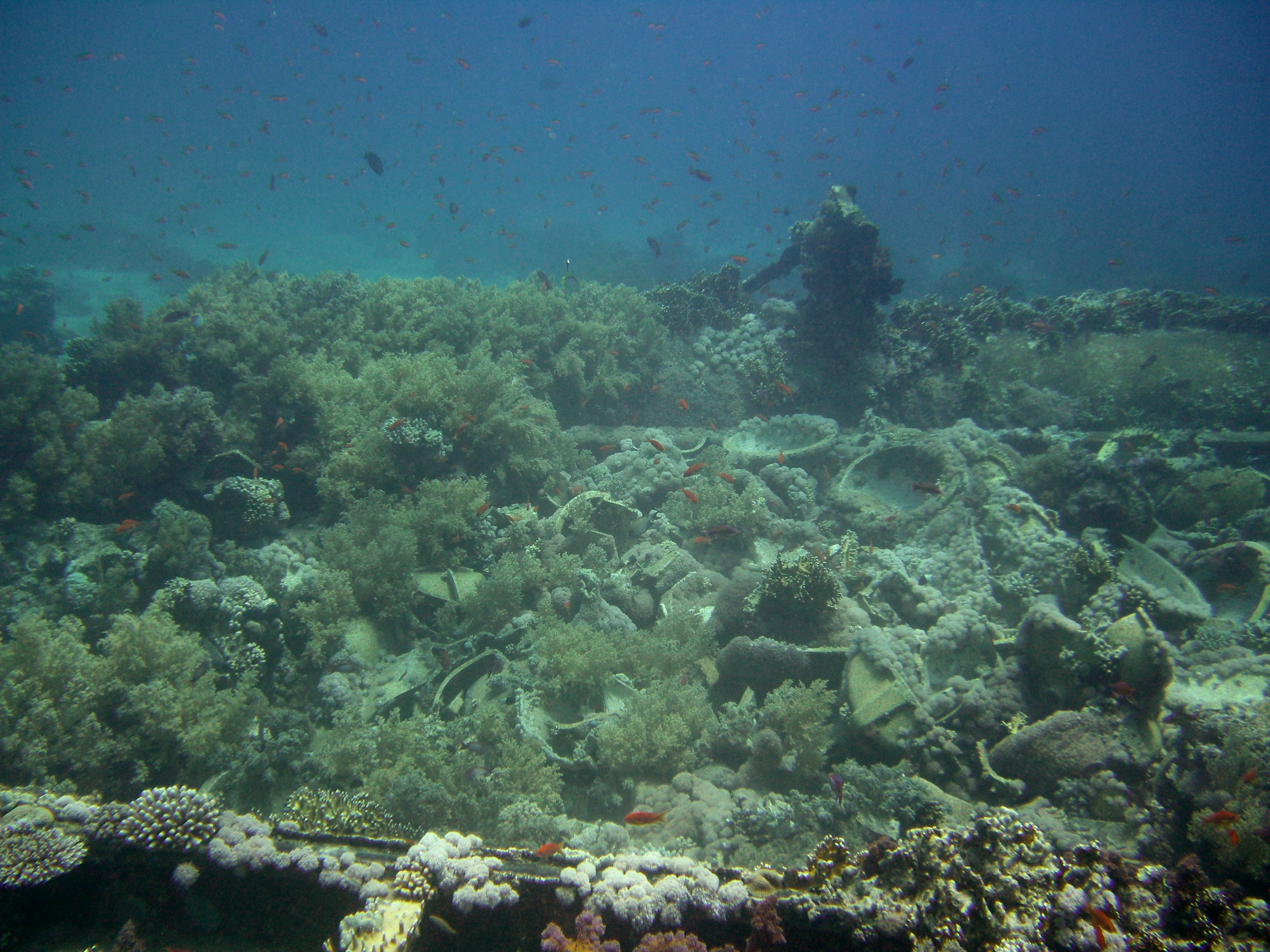
Porcelain debris

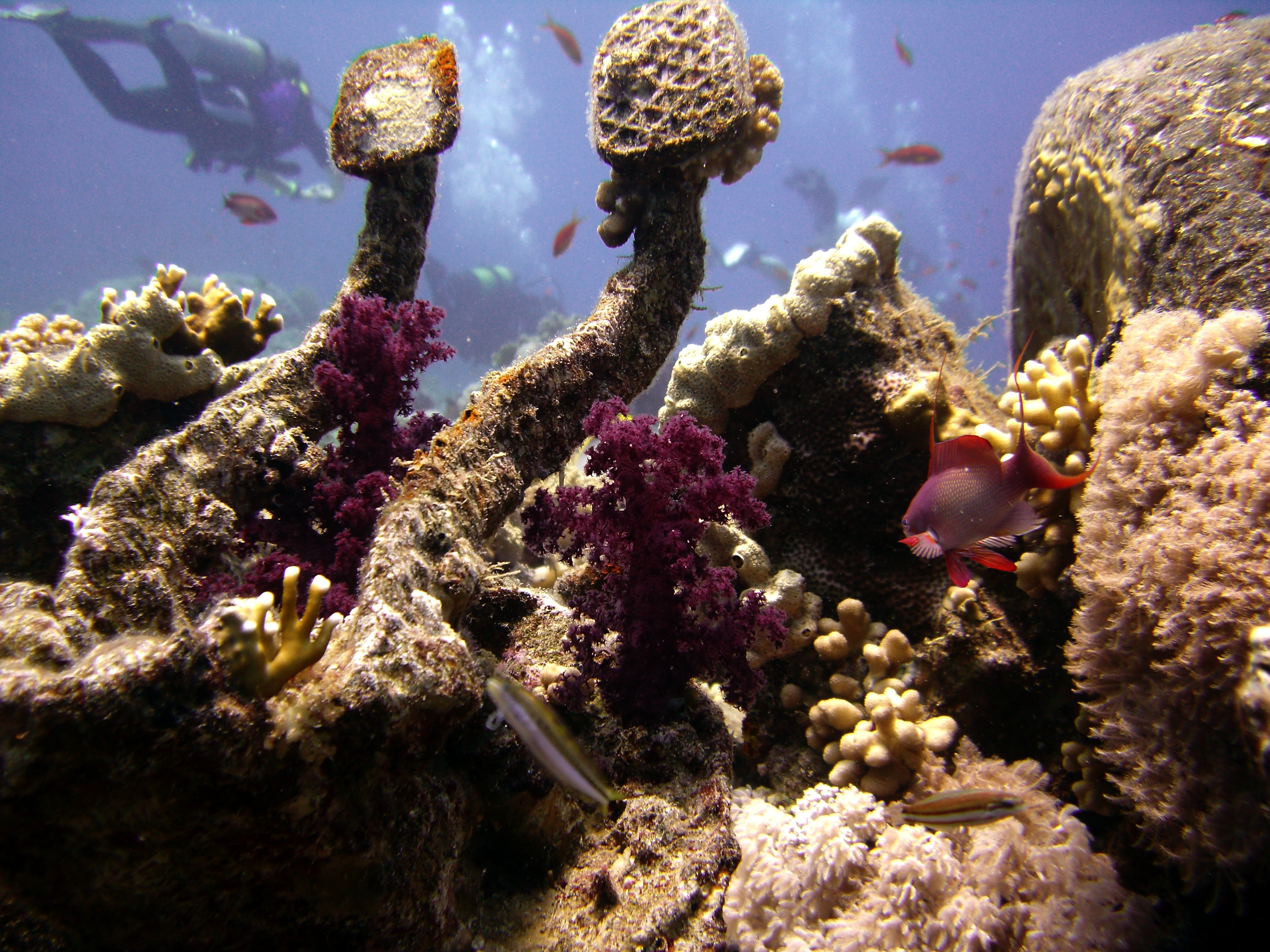
BMW pedals

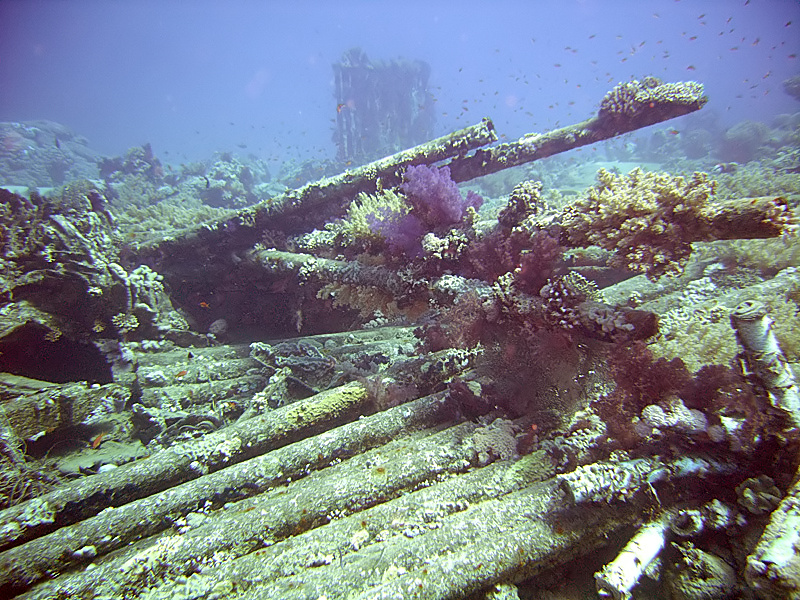
Pipes

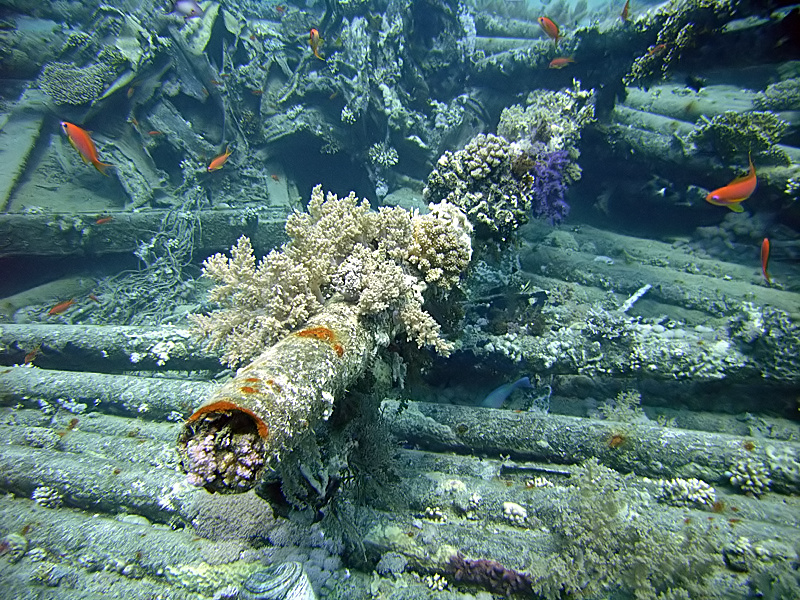
More pipes
