= MV María Alejandra =

Coordinates: 20.320°N 18.130°W

History
- Name: María Alejandra
- Owner: Mar Oil S.A. (Wilson Walton International)
- Port of registry: (Spain) Cádiz
- Route: Algeciras - Ras Tanura - Algeciras
- Builder: Astilleros de Cádiz, Cádiz, Spain
- Yard number: Nº 101
- Laid down: 24 March 1975
- Launched: 5 October 1975
- Completed: 26 April 1976
- In service: 1977
- Out of service: 11 March 1980
- Identification: IMO number: 7386233
- Fate: Sank at 20° 32' N, 18° 13' W after internal explosions on 11 March 1980

General characteristics
- Type: Oil tanker
- Tonnage: 122,599 GRT
- Length: 328.51 m (1,077 ft 9 in)
- Beam: 51.06 m (167 ft 6 in)
- Draught: 23.30 m (76 ft 5 in)
- Depth: 26.18 m (85 ft 11 in)
- Installed power: 32,560 CV
- Speed: 15.25 knots (28.24 km/h; 17.55 mph)
- Capacity: 283,813 m^{3} (1,785,130 bbl) in 19 tanks
- Crew: 43

MV María Alejandra was a Spanish oil tanker built in 1975 at Cádiz, Spain. She sank suddenly on high seas some 130–150 kilometres (70–81 nmi) off the coast west of Nouadhibou, Mauritania, on 11 March 1980 after several internal explosions, presumably related to malfunctions in the inert gas system. Of the 43 people aboard, 36 perished.

She was the penultimate ship built by Astilleros de Cádiz, Cádiz, one of the main shipyards in Spain. Before its completion the original customer, the Italian company D'Amico Società di Navegazione, canceled the contract. Finally in 1977 she was acquired by Mar Oil, member of the Wilson Walton group, to bring oil from Ras Tanura in the Persian Gulf to refineries in Algeciras in southern Spain. During the return trip from Algeciras to Ras Tanura the ship was unloaded, in ballast.

== Incident ==
On 4 March 1980 María Alejandra arrived in Algeciras Bay and unloaded the oil the vessel brought from the Persian Gulf at the CEPSA refinery. During unloading, the crew found problems with the inert gas system, which prevented explosions in the holds. The unloading ended on 6 March and preparations for the next leg back to Ras Tanura started next. In the first hours of 8 March she left port again, however, the problems with the inert gas system were not fully resolved, and the crew were working on them en route.

After a stop at Las Palmas in the Canary Islands, María Alejandra was sailing south along the western African coast headed for the Cape of Good Hope and the Indian Ocean. At about 13:30 hours Spanish time on 11 March an explosion was felt aboard, suddenly followed by other explosions. According to the survivors the ship broke apart and sank in about 40 seconds.
