= Hans-Emil Schuster =

German astronomer (1934–2024)

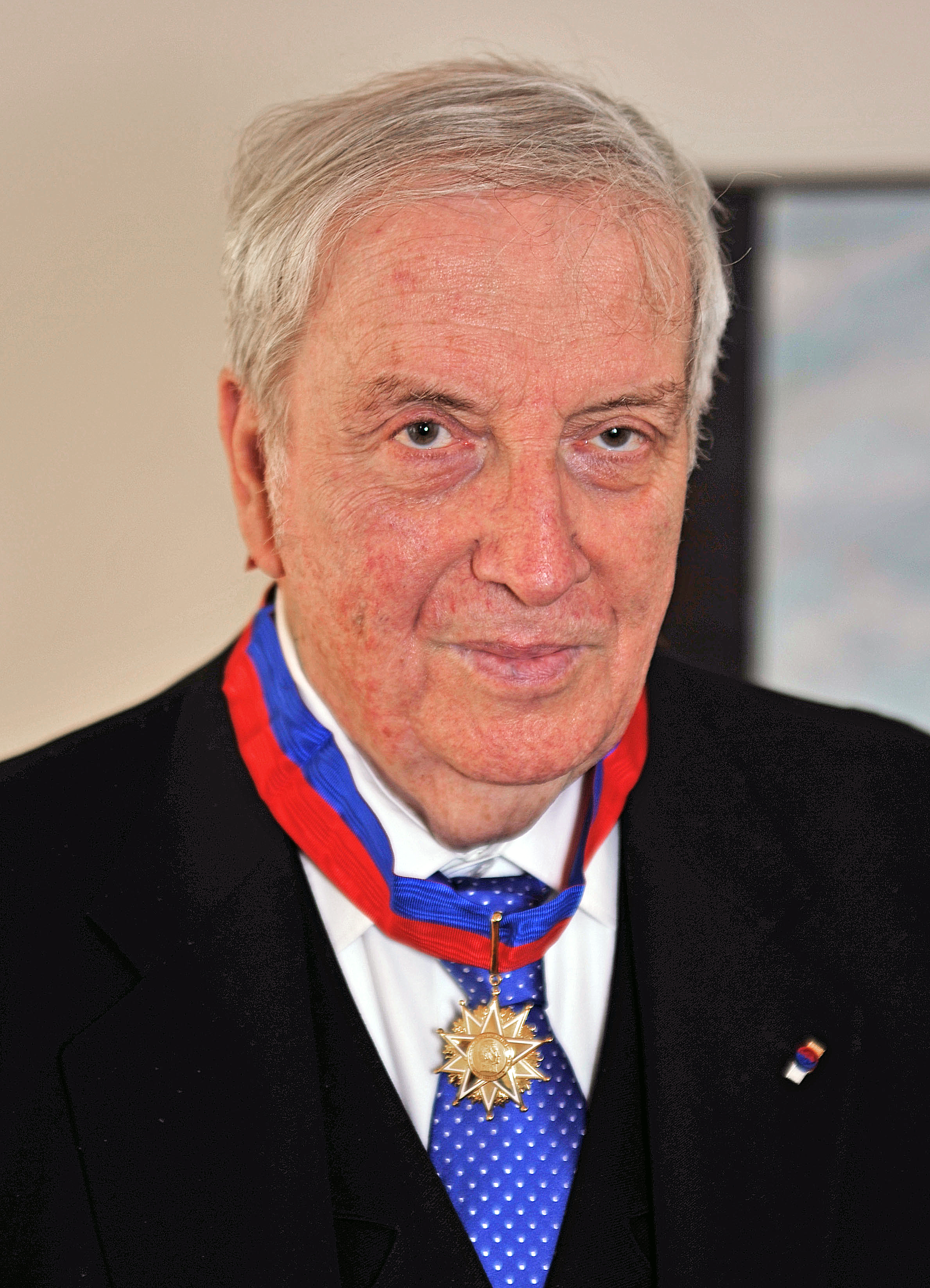
- Hans-Emil Schuster (2011)
- Born: 19 September 1934; Hamburg, Germany
- Died: 20 December 2024 (aged 90)
- Occupation: Astronomer

Minor planets discovered: 25
see § List of discovered minor planets

Hans-Emil Schuster (19 September 1934 – 20 December 2024) was a German astronomer and a discoverer of minor planets and comets, who retired in October 1991. He worked at Hamburg Observatory at Bergedorf and European Southern Observatory (ESO), and was a former acting director of La Silla Observatory. From 1982, he was married to Rosemarie Schuster née von Holt (28 March 1935 – 18 September 2006)

He discovered periodic comet 106P/Schuster. He also discovered the comet C/1976 D2 (in the contemporary nomenclature, it was known as Comet 1975 II or 1976c), which was notable for its large perihelion distance of 6.88 AU , the largest yet observed at the time.

He discovered 25 asteroids, including notably the Apollo asteroid 2329 Orthos and the Amor asteroids 2608 Seneca, 3271 Ul, 3288 Seleucus, and 3908 Nyx. He discovered the near-Earth asteroid 161989 Cacus, which was lost and not recovered until 2003.

Schuster participated in the exploration, selection and testing of the sites of two ESO observatories: La Silla Observatory and Paranal Observatory (the latter is the VLT site).

He also participated in two ESO Southern Sky Surveys: the ESO-B survey ("Quick-Blue Survey") completed in 1978 was the first deep optical survey of the southern sky, and the "Red Sky Survey". Photographic plates were taken with the ESO's 1-meter Schmidt Telescope at La Silla.

He co-discovered the Phoenix Dwarf galaxy (with Richard M. West), and in 1976 also discovered the Eridanus Globular Cluster, one of the most distant globular clusters in the galactic halo. In 1980, he discovered a type-II supernova in the galaxy NGC 1255. However, "Schuster's Spiral" (Horologium Dwarf) is not named after him, but a different Schuster.

Schuster died on 20 December 2024, at the age of 90.

== Honours ==
The asteroid 2018 Schuster was named in his honour. On 21 October 2011, he was awarded the rank of Commander of the Order of Bernardo O'Higgins in recognition of his important contribution to astronomy in Chile.

== List of discovered minor planets ==
| 2105 Gudy | 29 February 1976 | list |
| 2234 Schmadel | 27 April 1977 | list |
| 2275 Cuitlahuac | 16 June 1979 | list |
| 2329 Orthos | 19 November 1976 | list |
| 2608 Seneca | 17 February 1978 | list |
| 3266 Bernardus | 11 August 1978 | list |
| 3271 Ul | 14 September 1982 | list |
| 3288 Seleucus | 28 February 1982 | list |
| 3398 Stättmayer | 10 August 1978 | list |
| 3496 Arieso | 5 September 1977 | list |

| 3908 Nyx | 6 August 1980 | list |
| 4761 Urrutia | 27 August 1981 | list |
| 6163 Reimers | 16 March 1977 | list |
| 6261 Chione | 30 November 1976 | list |
| 6847 Kunz-Hallstein | 5 September 1977 | list |
| 7215 Gerhard | 16 March 1977 | list |
| 10454 Vallenar | 9 July 1978 | list |
| 10669 Herfordia | 16 March 1977 | list |
| 11001 Andrewulff | 16 June 1979 | list |
| 11789 Kempowski | 5 September 1977 | list |

| 12211 Arnoschmidt | 28 May 1981 | list |
| 26074 Carlwirtz | 8 October 1977 | list |
| 46514 Lasswitz | 15 May 1977 | list |
| 73640 Biermann | 5 September 1977 | list |
| 161989 Cacus | 8 February 1978 | list |

== See also ==
- List of minor planet discoverers § Discovering astronomers
