= Hoffmann =

Hoffmann is a German surname.

== People ==
=== A ===
- Adolph Hoffmann (1858–1930), German politician
- Albert Hoffmann (1846–1924), German horticulturist
- Alexander Hoffmann (born 1975), German politician
- Andrew Hoffman (born 2000), American baseball player
- Arthur Hoffmann (politician) (1857–1927), Swiss politician and member of the Swiss Federal Council
- Asa Hoffmann (born 1943), American chess player
- August Heinrich Hoffmann von Fallersleben (1798–1874), German poet

=== B ===
- Banesh Hoffmann (1906–1986), American mathematician and physicist, biographer of Einstein
- Baptist Hoffmann (1863–1937), German operatic baritone and voice teacher
- Bettina Hoffmann (born 1960), German politician
- Bruno Hoffmann (1913–1991), German glass harp player

=== C ===
- Charles F. Hoffmann (1838–1913), German-American topographer
- Christoph Hoffmann (1815–1885), German politician and Templer
- Christoph Hoffmann (born 1957), German politician

=== D ===
- Dariusz Hoffmann, Polish YouTuber
- David Hoffmann (disambiguation)

=== E ===
- E. T. A. Hoffmann (Ernst Theodor Amadeus Hoffmann; 1776–1822), German writer, eponym of The Tales of Hoffmann
- Erich Hoffmann (1868–1959), German dermatologist
- Ernst Hoffmann (conductor) (1899–1956), American symphony conductor

=== F ===
- Falk Hoffmann (born 1952), East German diver
- Felix Hoffmann (1868–1949), German chemist (aspirin)
- Felix Hoffmann (basketball) (born 1989), German basketball player
- Felix Hoffmann (illustrator) (1911–1975), Swiss graphic designer and artist
- Ferenc Hoffmann, birth name of Ephraim Kishon (1924–2005), Israeli author, dramatist, screenwriter, and film director
- Francis Hoffmann (1822–1903), German-American clergyman, politician and writer
- Frederic de Hoffmann (1924–1989), Austrian-American nuclear physicist
- Friedrich Hoffmann (1660–1742), German physician and chemist at Halle
- Friedrich Albin Hoffmann (1843–1924), German internist
- Fritz Hoffmann-La Roche (1868–1920), Swiss founder of chemical company

=== G ===
- Gaby Hoffmann (born 1982), American actress
- Geza von Hoffmann (1885–1921), Austrian-Hungarian eugenicist and writer
- Georg Franz Hoffmann (1760–1826), German botanist and lichenologist
- Gerhard Hoffmann (pilot) (1919–1945), World War II German flying ace
- Gleisi Hoffmann, Brazilian politician and lawyer
- Gordon Hoffmann (born 1978), German politician (CDU)

=== H ===
- Hanna Hoffmann (1858–1917), Danish sculptor and silversmith
- Hans Hoffmann (painter) (c.1530–1592), German artist
- Héctor Omar Hoffmann (1949–2020), Argentine singer-songwriter artistically known as Sergio Denis
- Heinrich Hoffmann (author) (1809–1894), German psychiatrist and author
- Heinrich Hoffmann (sport shooter) (1867–?), German sports shooter
- Heinrich Hoffmann (photographer) (1885–1957), German photographer, Hitler's personal photographer and Nazi politician
- Heinrich Hoffmann (pilot) (1913–1941), World War II German flying ace
- Heinz Hoffmann (1910–1985), East German General and Defence Minister
- Helen Hoffmann (born 2002), German cross-country skier
- Hermann Hoffmann (1819–1891), German botanist and mycologist
- Hilmar Hoffmann (1925–2018), German film festival director, cultural politician, director of Goethe-Institute, writer

=== I ===
- Ingo Hoffmann (born 1953), Brazilian Formula One & Two racecar driver

=== J ===
- James Hoffmann (born 1979), English barista, businessman and online influencer
- Jan Hoffmann (born 1955), German figure skater
- Jens Hoffmann (born 1974), Costa Rican writer and curator of exhibitions
- Joachim Hoffmann (1930–2002), German historian
- Johann Hoffmann (neurologist) (1857–1919), German neurologist
- Johann Joseph Hoffmann (1805–1878), German scholar and Oriental philologist
- Johann Leonard Hoffmann (1710–1782), Dutch army surgeon and amateur geologist
- Johannes Hoffmann (1867–1930), Bavarian politician and Minister-President
- John-Baptist Hoffmann (1857–1928), German Jesuit, anthropologist and Munda scholar
- Jörg Hoffmann (swimmer) (born 1970), German swimmer
- Josef Hoffmann (1870–1956), Austrian architect and designer
- Jules A. Hoffmann (born 1941), Luxembourg-born French immunologist and Nobel laureate

=== K ===
- Karel Hoffmann (1872–1936), Czech violinist
- Karl Hoffmann (Swiss politician) (1820–1895)
- Karl August Otto Hoffmann (1853–1909), German botanist
- Karol Hoffmann (born 1989), Polish athlete
- Kurt-Caesar Hoffmann (1895–1988), German admiral during World War II

=== L ===
- Leonard Hoffmann, Baron Hoffmann (born 1934), British Law Lord
- Luc Hoffmann (1923–2016), Swiss ornithologist, co-founder of the World Wildlife Fund

=== M ===
- Markus Hoffmann (1971-1997), German actor
- Mat Hoffman (born 1972), American BMX rider
- Max Hoffmann (1869–1927), German officer and military strategist during World War I
- Melanie Hoffmann (born 1974), German footballer
- Mike Hoffmann (1953/1954–2021), American musician and record producer
- Marcin Hoffmann (born 1972), Polish professor of chemistry at Adam Mickiewicz University

=== N ===
- Nickel Hoffmann (1536–1592), German architect

=== O ===
- Oskar Hoffmann (painter) (1851–1912), Baltic-German artist from Estonia
- Oskar Hoffmann (author) (1866–1928), German science fiction author
- Oswald Hoffmann (1913-2005), American clergyman and Lutheran broadcaster

=== P ===
• Patrick Edward Hoffman, electrical engineer and software developer, designer of RADVIZ Software (1948-2022)

- Paul Hoffmann, pseudonym of composer Montague Ewing (1890–1957)
- Philipp Hoffmann (1806–1889), German architect
- Professor Hoffmann (1839–1919), pseudonym for Angelo Lewis, English barrister, magician and writer

=== R ===
- Ralph Hoffmann (1870–1932), American ornithologist
- Reinhild Hoffmann (born 1943), German choreographer
- Reinhold Hoffmann (1921–1944), German fighter pilot
- Roald Hoffmann (born 1937), Polish-American chemist and Nobel laureate
- Roy Hoffmann, US Navy Rear Admiral
- Rüdiger Hoffmann (born 1964), German cabarettist

=== T ===
- Thorsten Hoffmann (born 1961), German politician

=== U ===
- Ulrike Hoffmann-Richter (1958–2024), German psychiatrist

=== W ===
- Werner Hoffmann (nightfighter pilot) (1918—2011), German fighter pilot

=== Z ===
- Zdzisław Hoffmann (born 1959), Polish triple jumper

== Other uses ==
- Hoffmann (motorcycle), defunct German bicycle and motorcycle manufacturer
- Hoffmann (automobile), German three-wheeled car
- Mount Hoffmann

== See also ==
- Hoffman
- Hofman
- Johann Centurius Hoffmannsegg (author abbreviation: Hoffmanns., 1766–1849), a German botanist and entomologist
