= David Hoffman =

David Hoffman may refer to:

- David Hoffman (jurist) (1784–1854), American jurist
- David Allen Hoffman (born 1944), American mathematician
- David E. Hoffman (born 1953), American writer and journalist
- David Francis Hoffman (born 1946), American criminal
- David H. Hoffman (born 1967), former federal prosecutor
- David George Hoffman (born 1948), wrongly convicted Canadian man.
- David M. Hoffman (born 1945), American author, political commentator and media activist
- David Hoffman (rabbi) (1954–2011), American rabbi
- David Alan Hoffman (born 1947), American lawyer, mediator, author, and academic

== See also ==
- David Hofman (1908–2003), British Bahá'ís faith leader
- David Huffman (disambiguation)
- David Hoffmann (disambiguation)
