= August 1980 =

Month of 1980

<<	August 1980					>>
Su	Mo	Tu	We	Th	Fr	Sa
					1	2
3	4	5	6	7	8	9
10	11	12	13	14	15	16
17	18	19	20	21	22	23
24	25	26	27	28	29	30
31

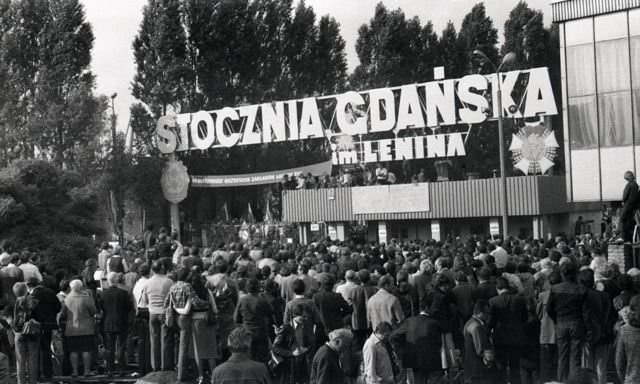
August 14–31, 1980: Solidarnosc movement wins recognition of freedom to organize trade unions

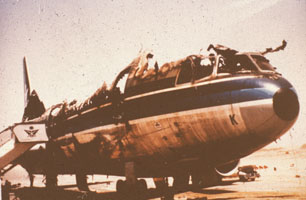
August 19, 1980: Fire kills all 301 people on Saudi airliner

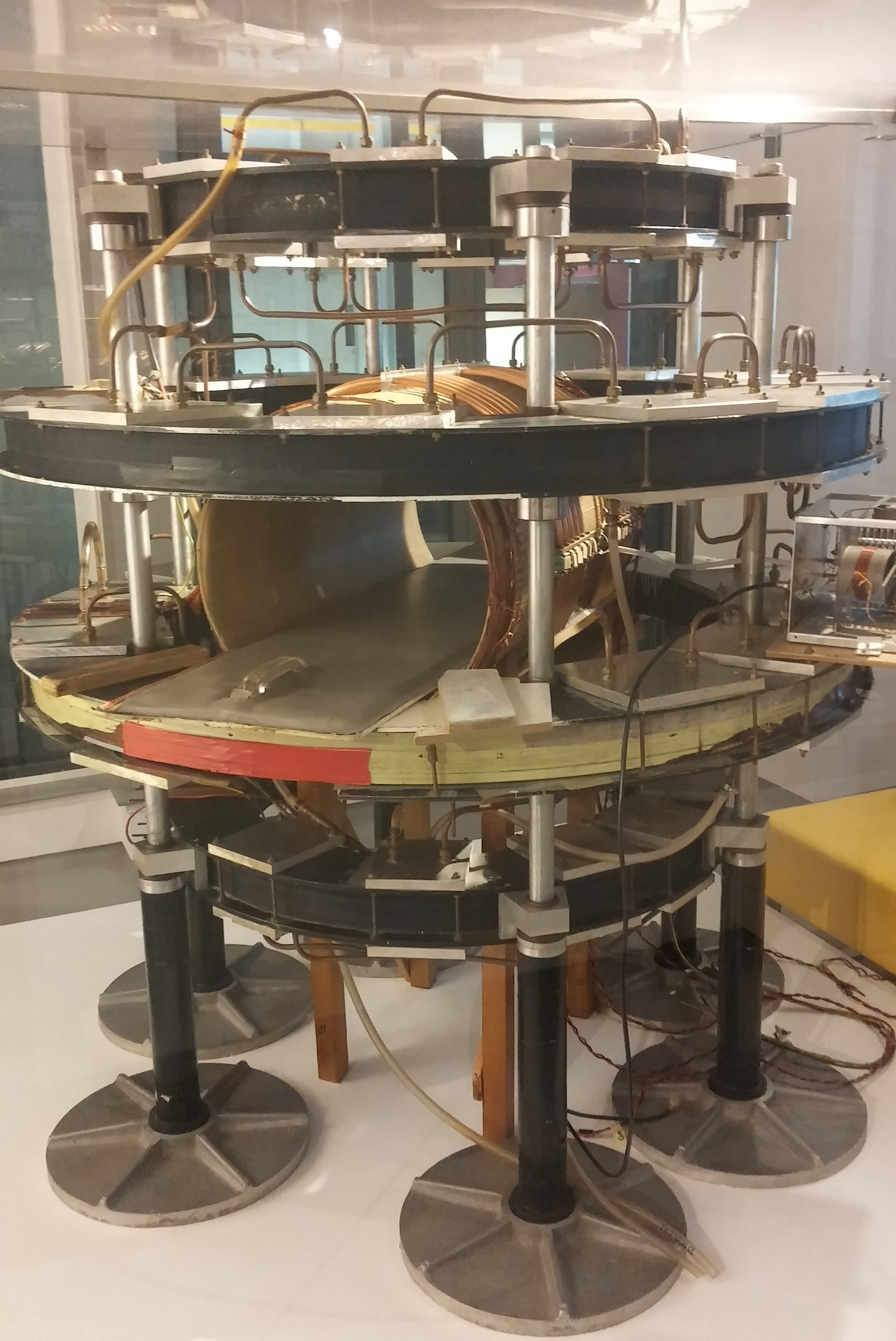
August 28, 1980: University of Aberdeen scientists perform world's first MRI scan

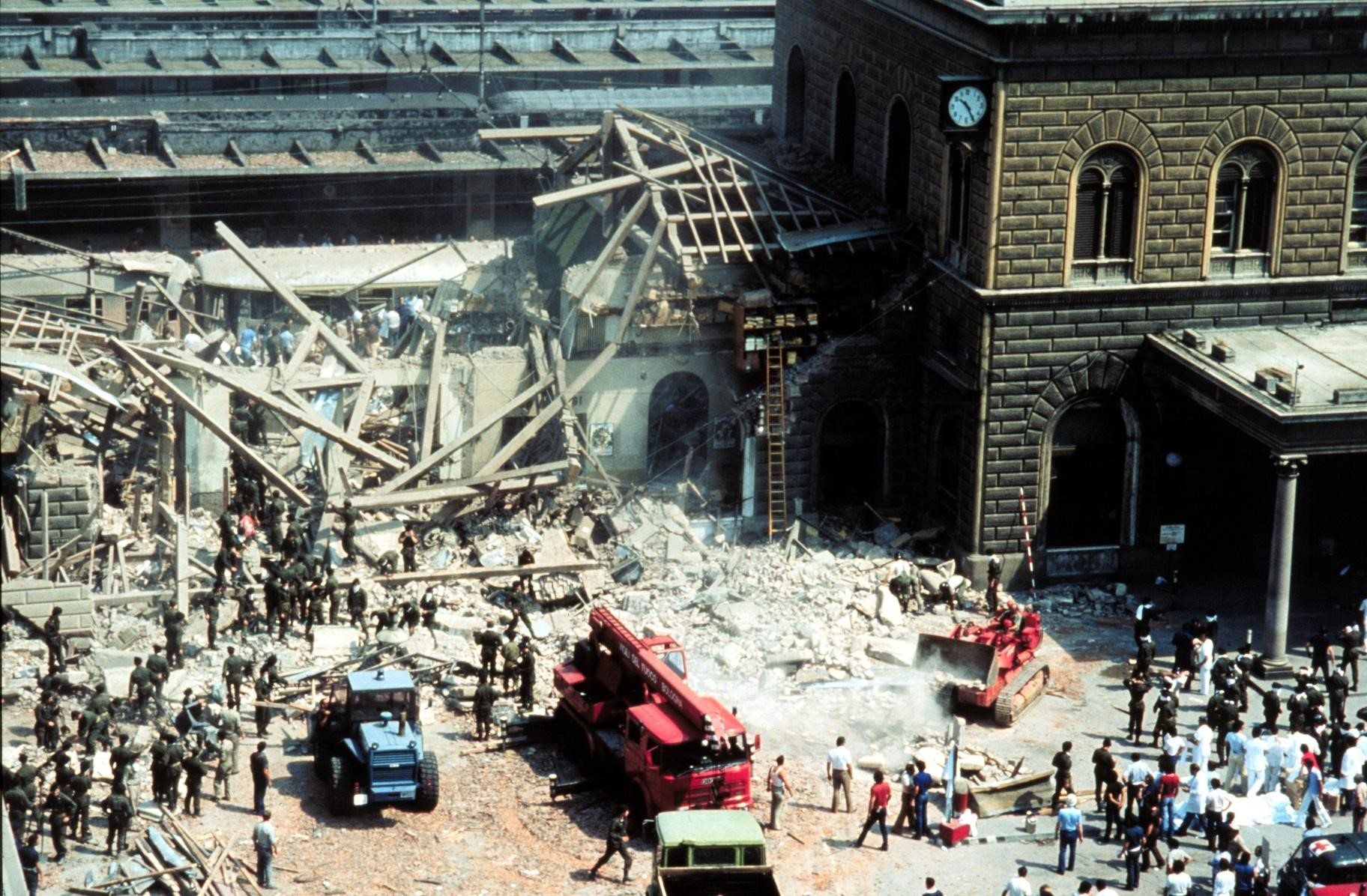
August 2, 1980: Terrorist bomb kills 85 at Italian railway station

The following events happened in August 1980:

== August 1, 1980 (Friday) ==
- The premium cable network Cinemax was inaugurated in the U.S. as a films-only channel operated by Home Box Office (HBO) The new service began at 10:00 in the morning Eastern Time.
- The wreck of the Dublin to Cork express train killed 18 people and injured more than 70, most of them teenagers who were on their way to Cork for a weekend vacation. Part of a group of 200 students, the victims were enjoying themselves in "two crowded restaurant cars located just behind the locomotive." At the railway station in the village of Buttevant in County Cork, only 30 miles (48 km) from their destination, the locomotive struck a faulty switch and derailed; the rear coaches then plowed into the back of the second dining car. The accident, at the time, was Ireland's deadliest crash.
- Vigdís Finnbogadóttir became the 4th President of Iceland and the world's first democratically elected female president.
- Died:
  - Strother Martin, 61, American film actor known for Cool Hand Luke
  - Patrick Depailler, 35, French race car driver
  - María Lourdes de Urquijo and her husband, Manuel de la Sierra, were murdered in their Madrid home by their son-in-law, Rafael Escobedo. The couple, marquis and marchioness, were the heads of one of Spain's wealthiest families as part of the Urquijo banking group.

== August 2, 1980 (Saturday) ==
- A terrorist bombing killed 85 people at the Bologna Centrale railway station and wounded more than 200. At 10:25 in the morning, the bomb exploded inside the first-class and second-class waiting rooms of the station and collapsed the roof above a platform of the tracks onto three cars of a train pulling out to go to Basel in Switzerland. Two hours earlier, a judge in the Italian city signed the indictments of eight members of the right-wing Armed Revolutionary Nuclei Group.
- Born: Jose Sixto "Dingdong" Dantes, Philippine actor and film producer; in Quezon City
- Died:
  - Regina "Gene" Weltfish, 77, American anthropologist and authority in the history of the Pawnee people of the Plains Indians.
  - Verdun Scott, 64, the only athlete to be a member of both the New Zealand test cricket team and the New Zealand rugby league team.

== August 3, 1980 (Sunday) ==
U.S. flag substitute, 1980

- The closing ceremony was held in Moscow for the 1980 Summer Olympics. Of the 81 participating national teams, 18 marched with the Olympic flag instead of their national flags in order to show their disapproval of the Soviet invasion of Afghanistan. Later, in place of the American flag to identify the nation that would host the next summer games, the flag of Los Angeles was hoisted instead.
- The first triathlon in Canada was held at Elk/Beaver Lake Regional Park near Saanich, British Columbia, almost six years after the modern event had been introduced in San Diego on September 25, 1974. The event of a one-mile swim across Elk Lake, a 20-mile bicycle race and a ten-kilometer run, attracted 51 competitors.
- Born:
  - Teuku Rifnu Wikana, Indonesian film actor, in Pematangsiantar, North Sumatra
  - Nadia Ali, Libyan-born Pakistani-American singer, in Tripoli
- Died: Donald Ogden Stewart, 85, American author and screenweriter

== August 4, 1980 (Monday) ==
- Hurricane Allen swept across Haiti, killing 220 people in 24 hours. After officials in Haiti discovered 140 additional bodies that had been buried in mudslides, the death toll was revised from 80 to 220. Of 272 people killed by Hurricane Allen, all but 52 of the deaths were in Haiti.
- As Hurricane Allen broke the high pressure system that had stalled over Texas and brought rainstorms, the record heat wave in much of the United States began to abate as Dallas and most of north Texas reached a temperature of only 95 °F (35 °C) after six weeks in a row (42 consecutive days) of "triple-digit heat" — daily highs of at least 100 °F (38 °C) temperatures — since June 23.
- Died: Susan G. Komen, 36, American model, from breast cancer. In her memory, her younger sister Nancy Goodman Brinker founded the Susan G. Komen Breast Cancer Foundation.

== August 5, 1980 (Tuesday) ==
- Two serial killers— Jorge Sagrado Pizarro and Carlos Topp Collins— committed the first of a string of 10 murders in a period of 16 months in the city of Viña del Mar in Chile. The first random victim was Enrique Gajardo Casales, an electrician
- Born:
  - A. G. Sulzberger, American journalist and publisher of The New York Times since 2018; in Washington, DC
  - Claire Kuo (Kuo Po-yu), Taiwanese singer, actress and television host; in Hong Kong
- Died:
  - Harold L. Runnels, 56, U.S. Congressman for New Mexico since 1971, died from respiratory failure related to cancer
  - Warren A. Taylor, 89, the first Speaker of the Alaska House of Representatives

== August 6, 1980 (Wednesday) ==
- Legislative elections were held in the Solomon Islands, with 241 candidates running for the 38 seats of the National Parliament. The United Party, led by Prime Minister Peter Kenilorea, won 16 of the 38 seats.
- Born: Will Pan (Pan Weibo), American-born Taiwanese TV actor, in West Virginia
- Died:
  - Gaetano Costa, 64, Chief Prosecutor of Palermo, was assassinated by the Sicilian Mafia. Costa, who had signed the arrest orders on 55 indictments of the Spatola-Inzerillo-Gambino heroin trafficking gang, was outside of a bookstore when he was shot by two gunmen on a motorcycle.
  - Bronte Woodard, American screenwriter who adapted the Broadway musical Grease to film; in Alabama

== August 7, 1980 (Thursday) ==
Flanders and Wallonia

- The Belgian Senate voted, 132 to 23, to approve legislation to grant limited autonomy to the northern region of Belgium, Vlaanderen (Flanders), where most residents speak Flemish, a Germanic language similar to Dutch and the southern region in Wallonie (Wallonia, where the predominant language is French), with the Capital Region of Brussels to be separate. The vote followed approval earlier in the week in the Chamber of Representatives.
- In Poland, Anna Walentynowicz was fired from her job as a crane operator at the Lenin Shipyard in Gdańsk for attempting to recruit new members to the unauthorized labor union Free Coastal Trade Unions (Wolne Związki Zawodowe Wybrzeża or WZZW). The firing came seven months before Walentynowicz would have qualified for retirement on a government pension, prompting shipyard electrician Lech Wałęsa to call a strike on August 14, 1980.
- Nanyang University was closed and merged with the University of Singapore into the new National University of Singapore. From 1956 to 1980, Nanyang was Singapore's only private university to teach its curriculum in the Chinese language. The final graduation ceremonies were conducted on August 16, 1980, with 599 bachelor's degrees and four master's degrees awarded.

== August 8, 1980 (Friday) ==
- Philippines President Ferdinand Marcos issued the National Service Law, making national service obligatory for all Filipino citizens. Although a prior law required all men between 18 and 30 years old to perform military service, the 1980 decree provided for citizens to perform civic welfare service, law enforcement service or military service.
- Production ceased on the Ford Pinto compact car as the final model came off of the assembly line at the Ford Motor Company of Canada plant in St. Thomas, Ontario at the last factory that manufactured the vehicle. The St. Thomas plant had manufactured the first Pinto almost exactly ten years earlier, on August 10, 1970.
- Five adults and five children were killed in a fire at the Central Hotel in the Irish seaside resort of Bundoran in County Donegal.
- Chuttalunnaru Jagratha, one of the most popular movies in India, was released as a Telugu language film and starred the actress Sridevi (Shree Amma Yanger Ayyapan) and the actor Krishna (Siva Rama Krishna Ghattamaneni). Sridevi reprised her role in two remakes, the Tamil language Pokkiri Raja in 1982 and the Hindi language Mawaali in 1983.
- Born:
  - Armenchik (stage name for Armen Gondrachyan), Armenian-born American pop music singer, in Yerevan, Armenian SSR, Soviet Union
  - Komila "Kim" Jagtiani, Indian-born Canadian television host; in Mumbai
- Died:
  - Yahya Khan, 63, former President of Pakistan
  - Titus Theverthundiyil, 75, Indian independence activist and adviser to Mahatma Gandhi
  - Lieutenant General Kim Hong-il, 81, South Korean military officer and diplomat, former activist for Korea's independence from Japan.

== August 9, 1980 (Saturday) ==
- Mohammad-Ali Rajai was nominated to be the first new Prime Minister of Iran in almost nine months, as the second choice of President Abolhassan Bani-Sadr. The Islamic Republican Party had rejected Bani-Sadr's original pick, the moderately conservative Mostafa Mir-Salim, the director of the Iranian national police. On August 11, the Islamic Republic's new parliament, the Majlis, approved Education Minister Rajai, a hardliner who was more adamant about Islamic law. Iran had been without a prime minister since the resignation of Mehdi Bazargan on November 6.
- Takieddin el-Solh resigned as Prime Minister of Lebanon after 20 days of trying to form a coalition government during the Lebanon Civil War. President Elias Sarkis had selected el-Solh on July 20 to replace Salim Al-Hoss.
- Died: Jacqueline Cochran, 74, woman aviator who set numerous speed and altitude records and was the first woman to fly faster than Mach 1 and Mach 2.

== August 10, 1980 (Sunday) ==
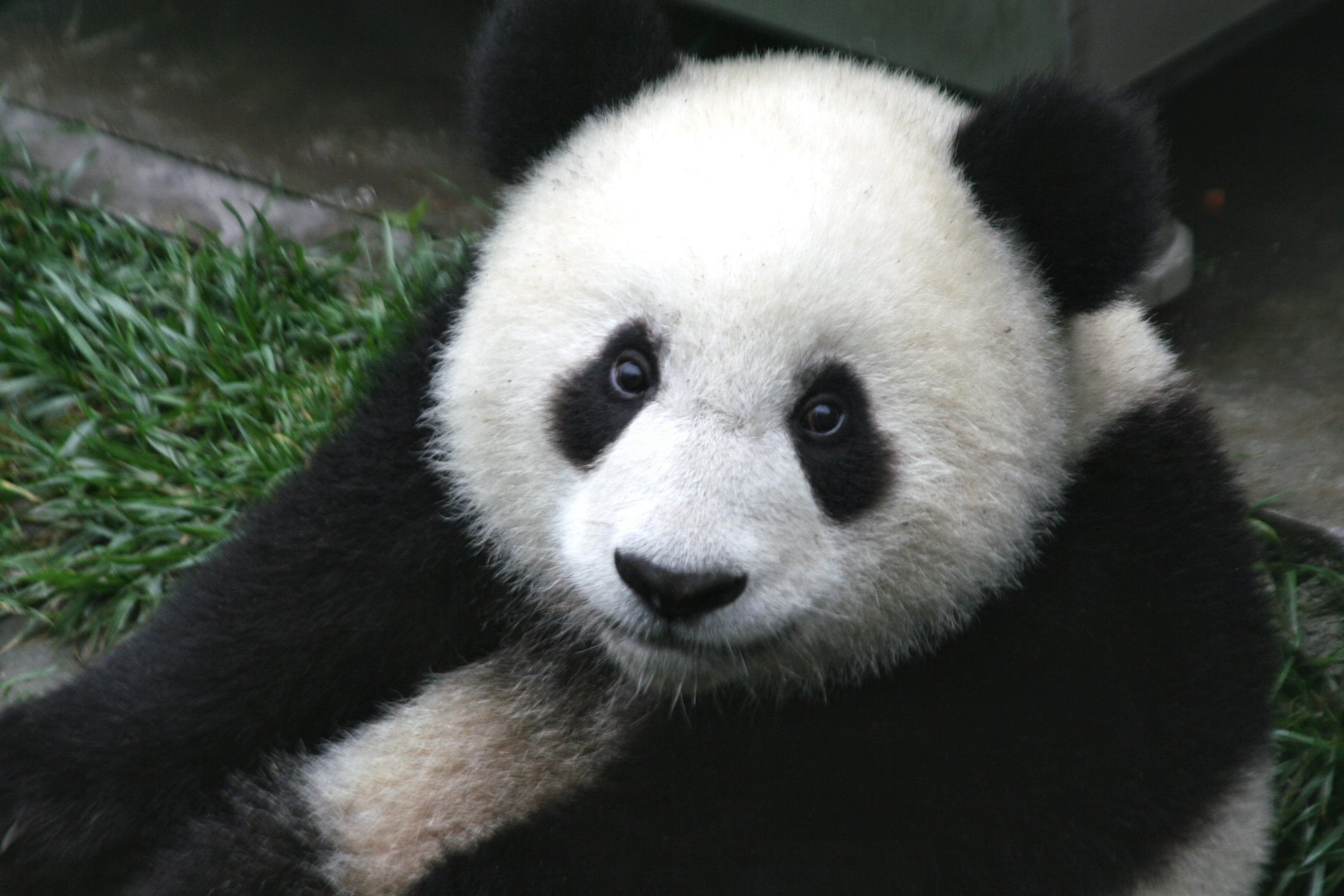
A giant panda cub

- For the first time since the People's Republic had started the practice of allowing zoos in other nations to receive the endangered species of bear, a giant panda (Ailuropoda melanoleuca) was born outside of China. "Xeng-Li" was born in captivity at the Chapultepec Zoo in Mexico City, but lived only eight days after being accidentally smothered by its captive mother, "Yin-Yin".
- David Francis Hoffman murdered his wife, Carol Stebbins, at their home in Saint Paul, Minnesota, dismembered her body and then disposed of it with the help of his mother, Helen Ulvinen.
- An annular solar eclipse took place over the Pacific Ocean, visible primarily from the Galápagos Islands.
- Died: Gareth Evans, 34, British philosopher, from lung cancer

== August 11, 1980 (Monday) ==
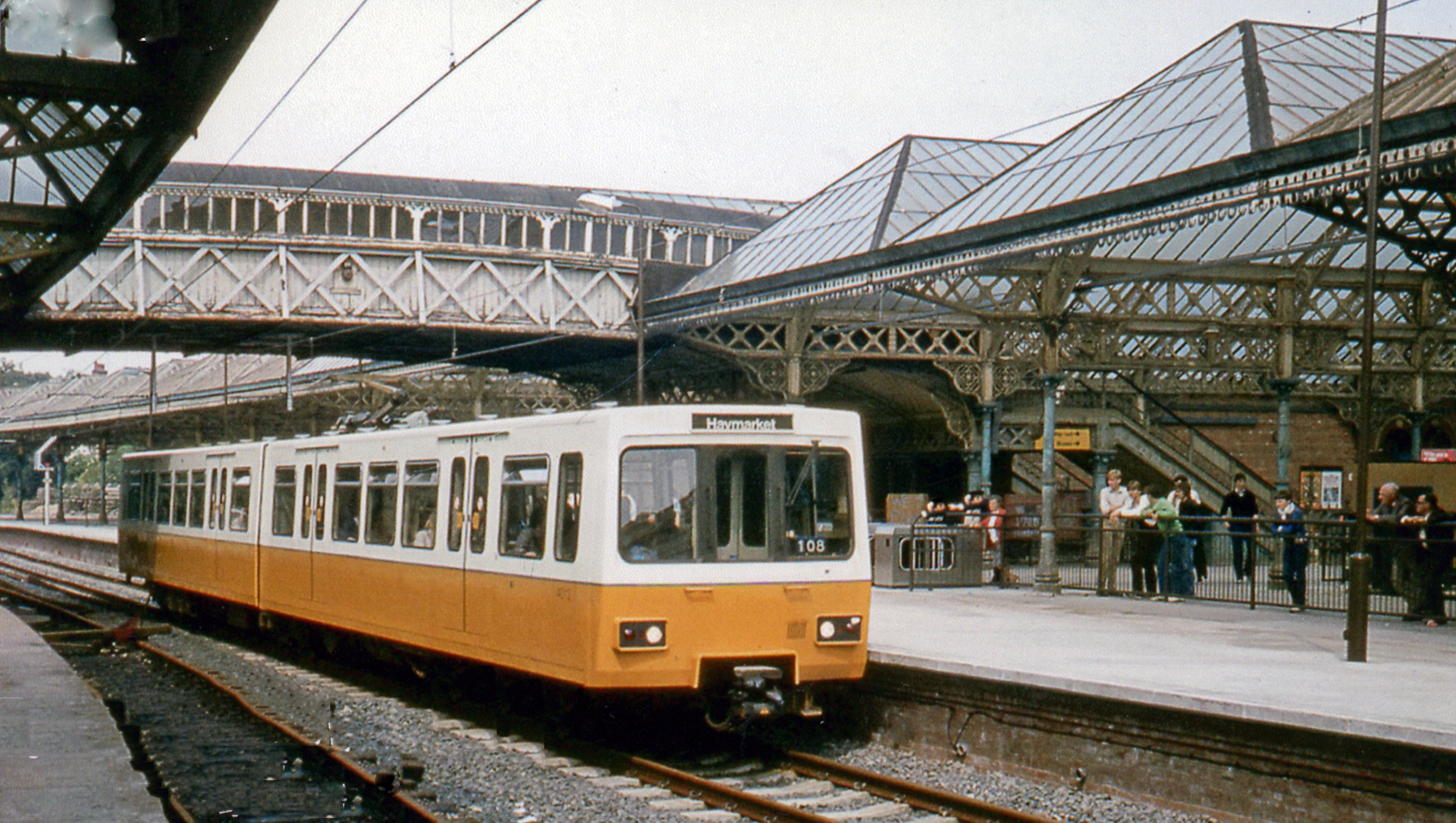
The light-rail Metro train

- The Tyne and Wear Metro system, the United Kingdom's first light-rail underground subway system, opened its first stage. The original line ran in northern England within the metropolitan county of Tyne and Wear, from Haymarket Metro station in Newcastle upon Tyne, to Tynemouth Metro station in North Tyneside.
- The presidential campaign of U.S. Senator Teddy Kennedy ended at the Democratic convention after Kennedy's supporters were unable to get a change of rules to permit an "open convention", where they would be allowed to vote for the candidate of their choice on the first ballot, regardless of whom they had been committed to represent. With 1,666 votes of 3,330 necessary to change the rules, less than 1,390 were in favor and 1,936 were against the change. After Speaker of the U.S. House and convention chairman Tip O'Neill announced the result at 8:42 in the evening, Kennedy quit the race.
- The Central Committee of the Chinese Communist Party issued an order banning further construction of memorials to the late Chairman Mao Zedong and called for a strict limit on the number of portraits of Mao and of inscriptions of quotes attributed to him. The gradual dismantling of the personality cult had started in the final week of July, when workers were seen removing four large portraits of Chairman Mao from the Great Hall of the People in Tienanmen Square in Beijing.
- Chrysler Corporation re-introduced its Imperial luxury automobile brand with a 1981 model, after discontinuing its luxury line in 1975, as the first of the new "K cars" rolled off of the assembly line at Chrysler's plant in Windsor, Ontario. At a ceremony, Chrysler chairman Lee Iacocca handed the keys to the first model to singer Frank Sinatra, who endorsed the car— one of the few 8-cylinder vehicles made in North America— in TV commercials. The vehicle was priced at $19,000 in the U.S., equivalent to $58,500 in 2020. The second, smaller version of the Imperial was manufactured only for the 1981, 1982 and 1983 model years.

== August 12, 1980 (Tuesday) ==
- ALADI (Asociación Latinoamericana de Integración) or Latin American Integration Association) was founded with the signing of a treaty by foreign ministers of 10 South American nations and Mexico, at a gathering in Uruguay to sign the 1980 Treaty of Montevideo. ALADI provided a system of classifying the member nations in three tiers of economic development, with Argentina, Brazil and Mexico as "highly industrialized countries"; Venezuela, Colombia and Chile as "fairly developed countries"; and Uruguay, Bolivia and Paraguay as "Lesser developed nations". The new organization replaced the Latin American Free Trade Association (ALALC/LAFTA) founded in 1960, "ending 20 years of efforts to emulate the European Common Market". The Associated Press noted that "Although delegates... paid lip service to the ideal of a 'Latin American Common Market,' they abolished a mechanism for negotiating across-the-board tariff reductions on traded items."
- The day after the British right-to-die organization EXIT, The Society for the Right to Die with Dignity announced that it would not publish its planned book Guide to Self-deliverance, its U.S. counterpart, the newly created Hemlock Society, announced that it would publish its own book. Based in Santa Monica, California, the group and its director Derek Humphry announced at a press conference that it would publish its own manual (released later under the title Let Me Die Before I Wake). Three officials at the Hemlock Society press event stressed repeatedly that the group was opposed to suicide, and Dr. Richard Scott clarified that "We're talking about accelerated death, chosen death for incurably ill people.
- Born: Maggie Lawson, American TV actress; in Louisville, Kentucky

== August 13, 1980 (Wednesday) ==
- After a pet pig strayed into Muslim prayer services during the Eid al-Fitr holiday, rioting that killed over 100 people began in the Indian city of Moradabad in Uttar Pradesh state and then spread to the cities of Srinagar, Aligarh and Bareilly. When local police refused to remove the pig, the angry worshipers responded by throwing rocks, and the police countered by firing into the crowd.
- U.S. President Jimmy Carter defeated Senator Edward Kennedy to win renomination at the 1980 Democratic National Convention in New York City. With all delegates required to vote for the candidate to whom they were pledged, Carter won on the first ballot, with 2,129 delegate votes, compared to 1,146 for Kennedy. Kennedy then released a statement saying that he would support Carter's election to a second term.
- Baseball's National League voted against adopting the designated hitter rule used in the American League, despite expectations that the rule change would be implemented. With the approval necessary of seven of the 12 NL club-owners, 4 approved, 5 rejected and 3 abstained.

== August 14, 1980 (Thursday) ==
- Workers at the Lenin Shipyard in Gdańsk walked out on strike after the government of Poland announced a second rise in food prices. Two days later, shipyard electrician Lech Wałęsa, an activist with the WZZW trade union alliance, initially negotiated a settlement with the Polish government for his co-workers at the shipyard before being criticized by Anna Walentynowicz and other labor organizers for making a deal that only affected the Lenin Shipyard, and Wałęsa and she then rallied strikers elsewhere in Gdańsk.
- Panic from a stampede in a movie theater in Iraq killed 59 people, most of them children who were watching a matinee when a small fire broke out and spread smoke. According to the Iraqi News Agency, the blaze occurred at the al-Baida cinema Jedidi, a suburb of Baghdad.
- Johan Ferrier, the first President of Suriname, was forced to resign by the Surinamese Army after having been the South American nation's head of state since its independence in 1975. Previously, Ferrier, who had been kept as president after the February coup d'état that ousted Prime Minister Henck Arron, had served as the last Dutch colonial governor. Ferrier was replaced by Arron's replacement, Prime Minister Henk Chin A Sen.
- Dorothy Stratten, the 1979 Playboy Playmate of the Year, was murdered by her estranged husband Paul Leslie Snider, who subsequently committed suicide.
- Born: Peter Malinauskas, Australian politician, Premier of South Australia since March 2022; in Adelaide, South Australia

== August 15, 1980 (Friday) ==
- George Manuel Bosque, a guard for the Brink's armored car company, drove off with $1,850,000 in cash after persuading his co-worker, the truck driver, to let him borrow the vehicle to pick up another individual. The cash had been flown from Honolulu by the First Hawaiian Bank and the Central Pacific Bank and was picked up at the airport before 7:00 in the morning by driver Jean Marie Jean, whom Bosque persuaded to let him use the truck to make a pickup from a messenger at another terminal of the airport. Bosque then drove the truck to the Airport Hilton hotel, where he stole a car from a maid at the hotel, then drove to Daly City, where he abandoned the vehicle at the Serramonte Shopping Center. Bosque would return to San Francisco, where he would be arrested on November 23, 1981, as he was leaving a supermarket. Sentenced to 15 years in prison, he would be paroled after less than five years and die of a drug overdose in 1991.
- Died: U.S. Army General William Hood Simpson, 92, Commander of the 9th U.S. Army in World War II

== August 16, 1980 (Saturday) ==
- Thirty-seven people were killed in a nightclub fire in London after an angry patron poured gasoline at the rear of the building and set it ablaze. At the time, it was the worst mass murder in British history. John Thompson had been ejected from Rodo's, a dance club at 18 Denmark Place in Soho, after an argument with a bartender. He then went to a service station, purchased a gallon of fuel, and poured it through a mailbox slot.
- Fifteen people were killed by the second of two gas explosions at the Golden Underground Shopping Arcade, an underground shopping center in the Japanese city of Shizuoka. The first blast, relatively minor, caused a fire at a sushi shop. Forty minutes later, while a crowd had gathered to watch firemen investigate, a much larger explosion happened at the same spot.
- Sixteen people were killed in a stampede at the Eden Gardens stadium in Calcutta (now Kolkata) during the annual soccer football match between rivals Mohun Bagan and East Bengal. The triggering incident was the act of the referee in ejecting one player from each team after a foul. Angry fans of both teams began throwing debris on the field and then fighting each other, and when police rushed into the section where the fight was occurring and began swinging cane clubs, fans fled in panic and many were trampled. The match continued while the violence was taking place in the stands, and ended in a 0 to 0 tie.
- The Lenin Shipyard at Gdańsk granted shipyard employees their demands, bringing an agreement to end a three-day strike. As Wałęsa was preparing to celebrate, Alina Pienkowska spoke up on behalf of workers in the rest of Poland who had followed his example of walking out on strike and told him "You betrayed them. Now the authorities will crush us like bedbugs." Though most of the strikers "rushed home to their families", New York Times reporter Michael T. Kaufman later noted in her obituary, "Ms. Pienkowska's message got through, and in many cases wives sent their husbands back; by nightfall, the shipyard was filling up once more."
- Choi Kyu-hah, the President of South Korea who was serving as a figurehead during military rule after the 1979 assassination of President Park Chung Hee, resigned. Under the terms of the South Korean constitution, Prime Minister Park Choon-hoon took over as Acting President pending the formal selection of General Chun Doo Hwan as a successor to Choi. General Chu Yung-bok, the Defense Minister, announced that all 600,000 members of the armed forces and the 2.5 million member reserve militia were on alert.
- Born:
  - Julien Absalon, French cross-country mountain biker and Olympic gold medalist in 2004 and 2008; in Remiremont
  - Vanessa Carlton, American singer; in Milford, Pennsylvania
- Died: James Dallas Egbert III, American college student

== August 17, 1980 (Sunday) ==
- Operations of the U.S. Viking 1 orbiter, which had arrived at Mars on June 19, 1976, were terminated 10 days after it had been raised from its altitude of 33,943 kilometres (21,091 mi) to 56,000 kilometres (35,000 mi).
- In Australia, a 10-week-old baby, Azaria Chamberlain, disappeared from a campsite at Ayers Rock in the Northern Territory. Her parents said that she had been taken away by a dingo during the night, but the child's mother, Lindy Chamberlain, was convicted of murder and her husband Michael was convicted of being an accessory. Three years later, Mrs. Chamberlain was released after a piece of the child's clothing was found in a dingo lair near the site of the disappearance and the convictions would be overturned in 1988.
- Born:
  - Lindsey Leavitt, American young adult novelist; in Las Vegas
  - Lene Marlin (stage name for Lene Marlin Pedersen), Norwegian singer; in Tromsø
- Died:
  - Gwen Bristow, 76, American journalist, novelist and screenwriter
  - William T. Keeton, 47, American zoologist and entomologist, after the failure of his mechanical heart valve

== August 18, 1980 (Monday) ==
- Chinese leader Deng Xiaoping gave the speech "On the Reform of the Party and State Leadership System" to the Chinese Communist Party Politburo and the Central Committee, beginning political reforms in the People's Republic of China, that would lead to a new constitution in 1982.
- In southwest Iran, 80 people were killed and 45 injured in an explosion of a road construction company's stockpile of blasting material at the city of Gachsaran. As bystanders watched, some local residents were assisting firefighters in combating a blaze in a neighboring building, when the fire triggered the explosion.
- Born:
  - Choi Min-ho, South Korean judo competitor, 2003 world champion and 2008 Olympic gold medalist; in Gimcheon, North Gyeongsang province
  - Damion Stewart, Jamaican soccer football defender and national team member
- Died:
  - Arman (stage name for Aramais Vardani Hovsepian), 59, Iranian film actor and director
  - John Sebastian, 66, American harmonicist

== August 19, 1980 (Tuesday) ==
- In what was at the time the third deadliest aviation disaster, all 301 people aboard Saudi Arabian Airlines Flight 163— 287 passengers and 14 crew —were killed when the jetliner caught fire shortly after taking off from Riyadh on a flight to Jeddah within Saudi Arabia. Although the Lockheed L-1011 TriStar returned to Riyadh and landed successfully, the crew was unable to open the doors to evacuate the aircraft and all aboard died of smoke inhalation. Initial reports were that 281 passengers and crew had died, and the number was revised after all of the bodies were found. Although the source of ignition was unclear, two portable camping stoves that had been smuggled onto the airplane were found in the airplane's passenger compartment, along with a fire extinguisher that had been used in an apparent attempt to extinguish a blaze. However, an investigation later concluded that the fire had started in the baggage compartment beneath the passenger cabin, that toxic smoke inhalation caused most of the deaths, and "the pilot wasted valuable time in dealing with the situation." Most of the bodies were those of passengers who had crowded toward the emergency exits at the front of the airliner.
- Sixty-seven people were killed and 62 injured in the worst railway disaster in Poland's history when a freight train missed a stop signal and collided head-on with a crowded passenger train. The early-morning disaster happened near the village of Otloczyn, about 10 miles south of Toruń. Many of those killed were vacationers who were returning to Łódź from resorts on the Baltic Sea
- Born:
  - Darius Campbell, Scottish singer-songwriter; in Glasgow (d. 2022)
  - Adrian Lulgjuraj, Montenegrin Albanian-language singer; in Ulcinj, SR Montenegro, Yugoslavia
- Died: Otto Frank, 91, German businessman and Holocaust survivor, father of Anne Frank

== August 20, 1980 (Wednesday) ==
- For the first time since 1973, the Soviet Union began the jamming of the radio frequencies of most western news broadcasts beamed at the Soviets, particularly the Voice of America and the BBC News. The decision was made to prevent Soviet citizens from learning news of the labor unrest in Poland. Although English language and Georgian language programs continued without deliberate interference, broadcasts in Russian and six other languages in the U.S.S.R. were blocked by "static-like noise or buzz created by high-powered transmitters built for that purpose" or by "loud music".
- The existence of the "Stealth Bomber" (officially, the B-2 Spirit), an experimental American aircraft that was "virtually invisible to Soviet radar", was publicly revealed for the first time by the U.S. Department of Defense. The B-2 bomber would be unveiled to the public in 1989.
- Died: Joe Dassin, 41, American-born French singer and songwriter, from a heart attack

== August 21, 1980 (Thursday) ==
- Fourteen of the crew on a Soviet Navy Echo-class nuclear submarine, K-122, were killed by an onboard fire. The sub crew sent a distress call when the boat was 85 miles (137 km) east of Okinawa, but refused help from Japanese aircraft and a patrol boat that sped to the scene.
- Died: Walter E. Sachs, 96, American financier and partner in the Goldman Sachs for 52 years

== August 22, 1980 (Friday) ==
- A team of archaeologists in Israel announced that they had unearthed a large "palace fortress" near the Temple Mount in Jerusalem that they believed was the palace of King David or King Solomon. Excavation leader of Yigal Shiloh of Hebrew University told reporters "Until this day, no monumental construction such as this has been uncovered in Israel in any other Biblical city," and estimated that the five-story tall structure had been constructed sometime between the 13th century BCE and the 10th century BCE.
- At least 75 people drowned in the sinking of the Mexican ferry boat Campeche as a load of people, several cars and trucks, and a bus went down in the Laguna de Términos between Carmen Island and the mainland of the state of Campeche. With more than 100 people on board, only 26 survived.
- The United States and the African nation of Somalia reached an agreement for Somalia to receive $20 million in military support in return for allowing American military forces to use Somalia's seaports and airfields.
- Died:
  - James S. McDonnell, 81, American aviator and founder of the McDonnell Aircraft Corporation, which merged with Douglas Aircraft Company to create McDonnell Douglas
  - Norman Shelley, 77, British radio actor

== August 23, 1980 (Saturday) ==
- After the U.S. Supreme Court ruling in United States v. Sioux Nation of Indians on June 30, the representatives of nine Sioux tribes on the Black Hills Sioux Nation Treaty Council met in Eagle Butte, South Dakota and voted to reject the $106 million settlement offered by the U.S. government for the 7,300,000 acres (11,400 mi^{2}) Black Hills (Pahá Sápa) in South Dakota, North Dakota, and Montana. The decision of the entire Sioux nation (with 51,000 residents in was scheduled for a meeting of representatives of the nine United Sioux Tribes on September 28 in Pierre, South Dakota.
- Bernard Ayandho was fired from his job as Prime Minister of the Central African Republic by President David Dacko, in addition to Vice President Henri Maïdou, and both were placed under house arrest. Maidou had been the minister of internal security during the reign of Emperor Bokassa.
- Born:
  - Joanne Froggatt, English TV actress, in Littlebeck, North Yorkshire
  - Rex Grossman, American college football quarterback, 2001 AP College Football Player of the Year; in Bloomington, Indiana

== August 24, 1980 (Sunday) ==
- As part of his bid to retain leadership of Poland during the nationwide labor unrest in the Communist republic, Polish United Workers' Party leader Edward Gierek announced the dismissal of Prime Minister Edward Babiuch and three other members of the PUWP Politburo, as well as his plan to allow secret ballot, multicandidate elections for new union leaders in all workplaces. Gierek announced that Jozef Pinkowski had been selected as the replacement for Babiuch.
- In the ongoing Guatemalan Civil War, 17 labor union leaders and a Catholic administrator were abducted from an estate near Escuintla, on the southern coast of Guatemala. They were last seen alive at a National Police detention center in Guatemala City where they were tortured before they vanished.
- Born: Rachael Carpani, Australian TV actress; in Sydney
- Died:
  - Yootha Joyce, 53, British TV comedian and actress known as "Mildred Roper" in Man About the House, later adapted to the U.S. as Three's Company, and for its sequel, George and Mildred; from liver failure
  - French Army Lt. Col. Jean André Pezon, 82, the last surviving French World War One flying ace.

== August 25, 1980 (Monday) ==
- The Broadway musical 42nd Street opened on Broadway. Its director, Gower Champion, died hours before opening night at the age of 61 from Waldenström's macroglobulinemia. Immediately after the final curtain at the Winter Garden Theater, producer David Merrick walked on stage and told the audience, "This is tragic. Gower Champion died today." With music by Harry Warren and lyrics by Al Dubin and Johnny Mercer, 42nd Street won the Tony Award for Best Musical and went on for 3,486 performances, closing on January 8, 1989.
- A special commission was created by the Soviet Communist Party Politburo in Moscow to formulate the Soviet Union's response to the independent labor union movement in Poland. Referred to as the "Suslov Commission", the task force was headed by senior Communist Party ideologist Mikhail Suslov, and included future Soviet leaders Yuri Andropov and Konstantin Chernenko, Foreign Minister Andrei Gromyko, and Defense Minister Dmitriy Ustinov.
- Zimbabwe was admitted as the 153rd member of the United Nations.
- Independent presidential candidate and Republican U.S. Congressman John B. Anderson announced that his running mate would be a Democrat, former Wisconsin Governor Patrick J. Lucey.
- Microsoft released its first operating system, Xenix, similar to the Bell Labs system Unix.

== August 26, 1980 (Tuesday) ==
- All 37 people on a Bouraq Indonesia Airlines airliner for Far Eastern Air Transport were killed when the Vickers Viscount nosedived as it was making its approach to Jakarta. The flight had departed Banjarmasin earlier in the day and was minutes away from its landing when a spigot fractured in the elevator control on the right side of the plane.
- The missing first half of the diary of Arthur Bremer, who had stalked U.S. President Richard M. Nixon and Alabama Governor George C. Wallace before shooting Wallace in 1972, was located underneath a bridge in Bremer's home town of Milwaukee.
- Born:
  - Macaulay Culkin, American child actor known for Home Alone; in New York City
  - Chris Pine, American film actor, known for the 2009 reboot of Star Trek in Los Angeles
- Died: Tex Avery (Frederick Bean Avery), 72, American animator and director who created most of the Looney Tunes characters for Warner Brothers

== August 27, 1980 (Wednesday) ==
- A three million dollar extortion attempt involving a time bomb delivered to Harrah's Casino in Stateline, Nevada, ended with a failed try at disarming and an explosion that caused extensive damage to Harvey's Resort Hotel. The day before, two men wheeled "a box about the size of a desk" into the casino and said that they had been told to deliver a photocopying machine. The device had with it a letter demanding payment in exchange for the instructions on defusing the bomb, and a warning that it would detonate automatically if further attempts were made to move it. U.S. Army specialists attached a remote-controlled "shaker" device to the bomb "to determine if it could be safely tampered with" and at 3:43 in the evening, the bomb detonated, hurling debris four blocks away and severely damaging the first three floors of the 11-story Harvey's Resort Hotel.
- Chun Doo-hwan was approved as the new President of South Korea by 2,525 of the 2,540 members of the National Council for Reunification, after the resignation of Choi Kyu-hah. The secret balloting took place at a sports arena in Seoul, and Chun had no opposition. The South Korean government issued a release stating that the 15 people who failed to vote for Chun "had been either ill, traveling abroad or unavoidably delayed in appearing for the balloting."
- Nguza Karl-i-Bond was named as the new prime minister of Zaire (now the Democratic Republic of the Congo), three years after he had been sentenced to death by firing squad for treason. Zaire's President Mobutu Sese Seko, who had ordered Karl-i-Bond's death sentence in 1977 but later pardoned and released his former aide, approved the appointment of the former condemned man to the head of government with the title "First State Commissioner". Karl-i-Bond replaced Bo-Boliko Lokonga, who had been elevated to the position of Executive Secretary of Mobutu's Popular Movement of the Revolution political party.
- The daily Ottawa Journal and Winnipeg Tribune newspapers abruptly cased publishing, after 95 and 90 years, respectively, of operation. Below headlines reporting "Hostage-taking cons still talking" and "A movie freak finally gets his fill", the morning Journal read "Ottawa Journal closed— Statement from the publisher" and the lead began, "It is with the deepest regret that I am obliged to announce the cessation of publication and closure of The Ottawa Journal effective with this morning's edition, Wednesday, August 27, 1980.
- Born: Derrick Strait, American college football cornerback
- Died:
  - Douglas Kenney, 33, American comedy writer and co-founder of the National Lampoon, was killed after falling from a cliff while on vacation in Hawaii
  - Sam Levenson, 68, American comedian and former game show host.

== August 28, 1980 (Thursday) ==
- Magnetic resonance imaging (MRI) was used for the first time after a team led by John Mallard built the first full-body scanner at the University of Aberdeen. Mallard's team obtained the first clinically useful MRI image of a patient's internal tissues, identifying a primary tumor in the patient's chest, an abnormal liver, and secondary cancer in his bones. The machine was later used at St Bartholomew's Hospital, in London, from 1983 to 1993. Mallard and his team are credited for technological advances that led to the widespread introduction of MRI.
- Father Gleb Yakunin, a Russian Orthodox priest and Soviet Dissident who had created the Christian Committee for the Defense of the Rights of Believers in 1976, was sentenced to five years imprisonment in a Gulag administered labor camp, followed by five years of exile. Yakunin had been found guilty of anti-Soviet agitation after continuing to publish articles about the suppression of religious freedom in the Soviet Union. The trial had been the first of a dissident priest since the 1975 signing of the Helsinki Accords. The next day, mathematician Tatyana Velikanova received a sentence of four years in a women's labor camp and five years of internal exile. for publishing reports of human rights violations. Yakunin would be kept in the KGB Lefortovo prison until 1985, and then in the Perm 37 labor camp before being exiled to the Yakutsk region near the Arctic Circle. In 1987 he would be released under an amnesty by Soviet leader Mikhail S. Gorbachev. Velikanova would serve most of her sentence, first in prison and then in exile in the Kazakh SSR.
- The Society for Risk Analysis was founded as an interdisciplinary, international commission to participate in risk assessment of potential world problems from developing events, and to develop policy recommendations for finding a peaceful resolution.
- Born: Carly Pope, Canadian TV actress; in Vancouver

== August 29, 1980 (Friday) ==
- An attempt by 165 people to hijack an airliner took place in Peru when the group of Cuban refugees forced their way onto Braniff International Flight 920, which had stopped in Lima on its way to Los Angeles. The flight began from Santiago in Chile and was at the Lima airport when "about 400 Cuban refugees swarmed onto the runway before dawn" and many of them forced their way up the boarding ramp before police stopped the others. The group had been in a refugee camp since April, when they had been allowed to leave Cuba after occupying the grounds of the Peruvian Embassy in Havana, and were demanding to join family in the U.S. They released their hostages and surrendered the next day in return for not being prosecuted.
- U.S. Representative Michael "Ozzie" Myers (D-Pennsylvania) became the first member of Congress to be convicted of accepting a bribe during the FBI's Abscam investigation. Myers, convicted along with three other defendants, was expelled on October 2 by his colleagues in the U.S. House of Representatives by a vote of 376 to 30, becoming the first Congressman since the U.S. Civil War to receive expulsion.
- Born:
  - William Levy, Cuban-born American telenovela actor; as William Gutiérrez y Levy, in Cojimar, Habana del Este
  - David West, American college basketball and NBA player; in Teaneck, New Jersey
- Died:
  - Anthony Giordano, 65, St. Louis crime boss
  - Louis Darquier de Pellepoix, 82, French collaborationist and convicted war criminal, died in Spain, which had refused to allow his extradition after World War II.

== August 30, 1980 (Saturday) ==
- The National People's Congress of the People's Republic of China opened in Beijing to approve major reforms under the guidance of the Chinese Communist Party.
- The Szczecin Agreement was signed between the Polish government and the Szczecin Interfactory Strike Committee, as one of three historic agreements creating an independent labor union in the Communist nation of Poland.

== August 31, 1980 (Sunday) ==
- The Gdańsk Agreement was signed at the Gdańsk Shipyard in Poland, opening the way to start the first independent trade union in the communist bloc, Solidarność (Solidarity).
- More than 200 people in the Nigerian city of Ibadan were killed, and 50,000 left homeless in a flood of the Ogunpa River.
- Jimmy Stevens was arrested, along with 70 of his followers after fighting for three months to make the South Pacific island of Espiritu Santo independent from the former New Hebrides and the Republic of Vanuatu. The rebels, who had moved inland after an invasion by French and British colonial forces in July, were finally defeated by the intervention of 110 troops from the Papua New Guinean infantry.
- Born: Joe Budden, American rapper, in Harlem, New York City
- Died: Dahmane El Harrachi, 55, Algerian singer of Chaabi music, was killed in an automobile accident in Algiers.
