= September 1980 =

Month of 1980

<<	September 1980					>>
Su	Mo	Tu	We	Th	Fr	Sa
	1	2	3	4	5	6
7	8	9	10	11	12	13
14	15	16	17	18	19	20
21	22	23	24	25	26	27
28	29	30

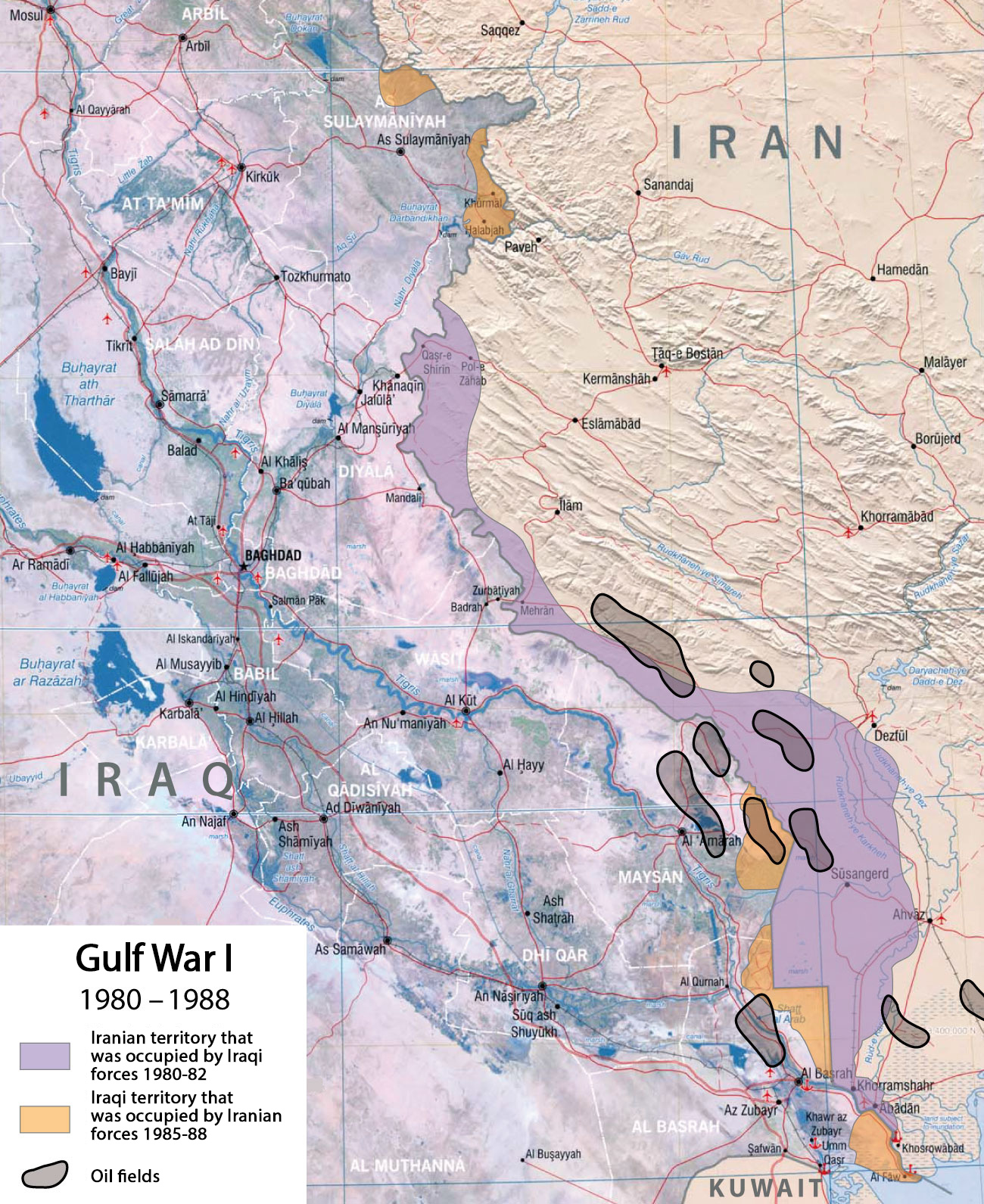
September 22, 1980: Iraq begins eight-year long war with Iran

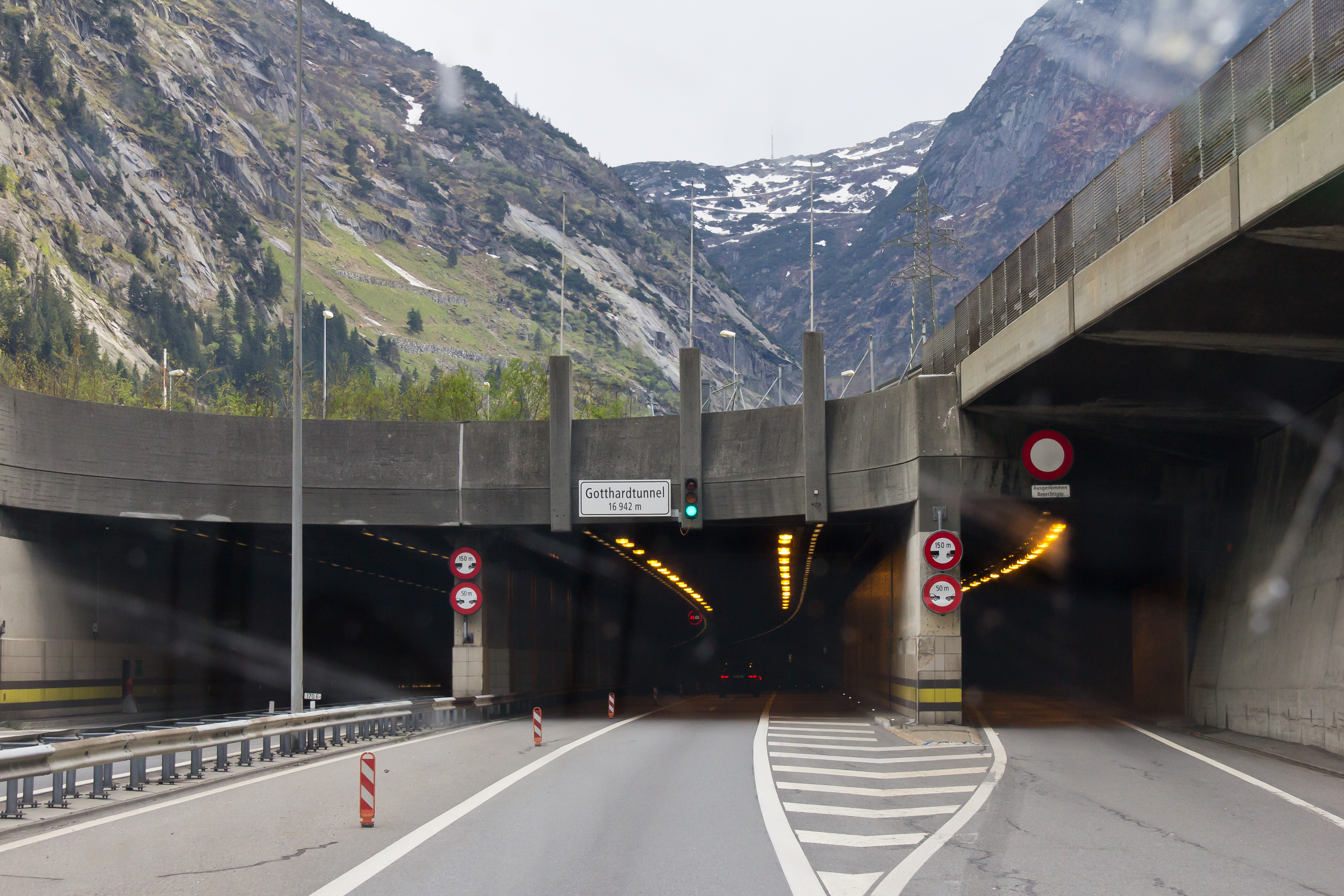
September 5, 1980: World's longest tunnel opens under the Alps

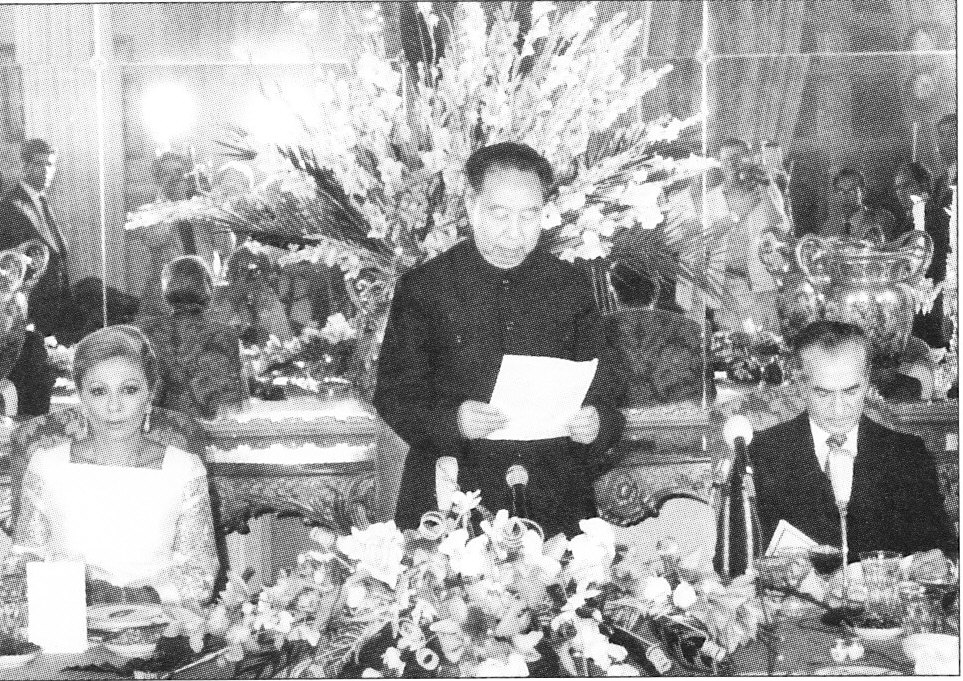
September 7, 1980: Hua Guofeng (pictured in 1978) steps down as Premier of China

== September 1, 1980 (Monday) ==
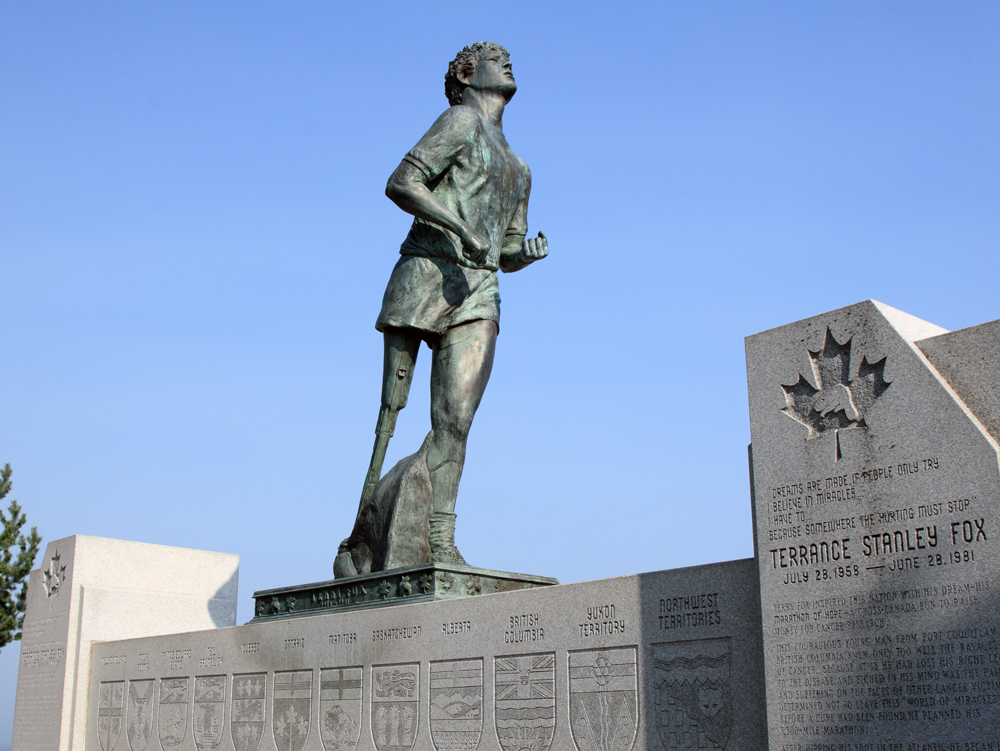
Terry Fox memorial

- Chun Doo Hwan was inaugurated as the new President of South Korea.
- Terry Fox, an amputee who had started a transcontinental run across Canada on April 12, to raise money for cancer research, was forced to end after having run 3,339 miles (5,374 km) of the nearly 5,300 mi (8,500 km) journey. Having started from St John's, Newfoundland and Labrador on the Atlantic coast with a goal of reaching the Pacific Ocean port of Victoria, British Columbia, Fox had raised US$1.7 million before suffering shortness of breath and nausea outside of Thunder Bay, Ontario, where he was taken to the Port Arthur General Hospital, originally for stomach flu. The next day, Fox announced that the cancer that had taken his leg had returned and had spread to his lungs.
- Francisco Villagrán Kramer resigned from his position as Vice President of Guatemala in a protest against the increased repression of human rights by President Romeo Lucas García.

== September 2, 1980 (Tuesday) ==
- Joseph Bonanno, a New York mobster known as "Joe Bananas", was convicted of a felony for the first time in a criminal career that dated back more than 50 years, when he began as a gun runner for Al Capone. Born in Sicily, Bonanno, aged 75, had avoided conviction for other charges during his time as a crime boss but was finally proven guilty of conspiracy to interfere with a federal grand jury investigation of his son.
- Announcements were made in both Tripoli and Damascus that the nations of Libya and Syria would merge into a single republic, but details of the union were not disclosed. President Muammar Gaddafi of Libya urged the parliament of the north African nation to approve the merger, adding "Either Libya turns into a unionist state and merges with Syria and bears the losses of the Arab nation, or I shall go to Upper Galilee" (in northern Israel) "as a commando myself with my rifle." Syria's President Hafez al-Assad sent a cable to Gaddafi agreeing to the merger, which would never actually take place. The formal merger agreement was signed on September 10.

== September 3, 1980 (Wednesday) ==
- The third of three major concessions by Poland's Communist government to end a labor strike took place as the Jastrzębie agreement was signed in the coal mining town of Jastrzębie-Zdrój. In addition to raising wages and permitting miners to organize their own union, the government brought an end to mining on Saturday and Sunday.
- Zimbabwe broke diplomatic and consular relations with South Africa, closing its missions in Pretoria and in Cape Town that had been established by Rhodesia's white-minority government and recalling the staffs. Zimbabwe's Prime Minister Robert Mugabe asked South Africa to close its diplomatic mission in the Zimbabwean capital, Salisbury (now Harare). At the same time, the Foreign Ministry noted that Zimbabwe would maintain its trade mission office at Johannesburg and that South Africa would retain its trade section in Salisbury.
- Born: Jennie Finch, American women's softball pitcher; in La Mirada, California
- Died:
  - Dirch Passer, 54, Danish comedian, and film and stage actor, died from heart failure. He collapsed, while in costume, as he was preparing to go onstage in the opening act of the Tivoli Revue at the Glassalen theater in Copenhagen.
  - Duncan Renaldo (stage name for Vasile Dumitru Cugheanos), 76, Romanian-born American TV actor known of portraying The Cisco Kid in the U.S. television western of the same name.
  - Barbara O'Neil, 70, American film actress known for portraying the role of mother to lead characters, notably as Scarlett O'Hara's mother in the 1939 production of Gone with the Wind

== September 4, 1980 (Thursday) ==
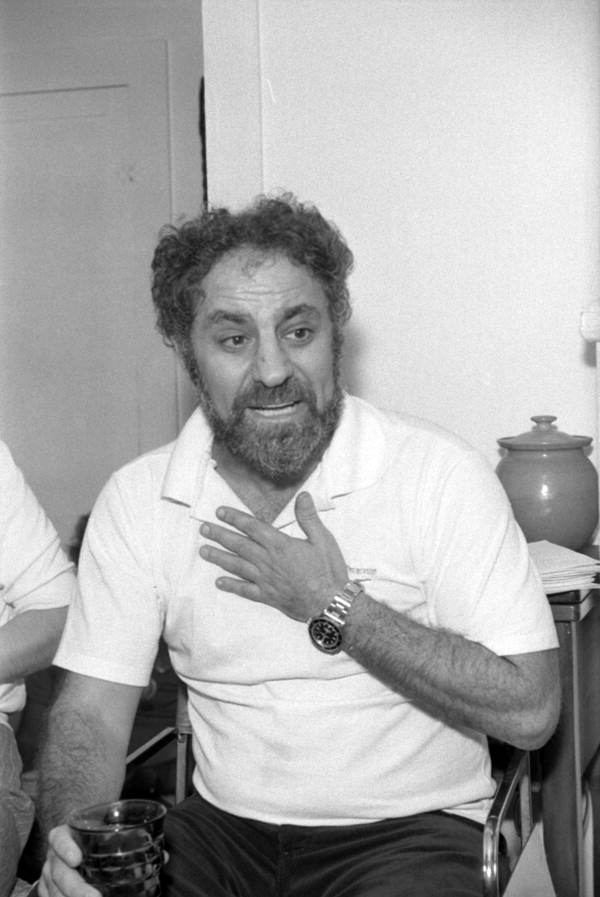
Abbie Hoffman a/k/a Freed

- U.S. anti-war activist Abbie Hoffman, a fugitive for the past six years after going into hiding while out on bail for a 1974 indictment for allegedly selling cocaine to undercover agents, voluntarily surrendered to the federal authorities at the U.S. District Court in New York City. The court allowed him to be released without bond on Hoffman's pledge to return for a later hearing on the narcotics and bail-jumping charges. Hoffman, founder of the Youth International Party whose members called themselves "Yippies", had undergone plastic surgery while a fugitive and had been living openly under the alias of "Barry Freed", even testifying before a U.S. Senate subcommittee in 1979.
- Born: Max Greenfield, American TV actor, in Dobbs Ferry, New York
- Died: Pepe Abad, 48, Spanish-born Chilean journalist and anchorman for the Televisión Nacional de Chile network

== September 5, 1980 (Friday) ==
- Mothers Against Drunk Driving (MADD) was founded by Candy Lightner of Fair Oaks, California, (originally as "Mothers Against Drunk Drivers"), four months after her daughter had been killed by a drunk driver on May 3. An author would note 35 years later that "By the late 1990s MADD had achieved its goal of lowering the BAC (minimum legal blood alcohol content level) in most states to .08 ... Remarkably, in less than 20 years the modest efforts of a grieving mother and a few American citizens had evolved into a sophisticated organization that defined an emerging social issue... powerful enough to shape national legislation and see it through into law.".
- The Gotthard Road Tunnel opened in Switzerland as the world's longest highway tunnel at 10.1 miles (16.3 km), stretching from Göschenen to Airolo beneath the Swiss Alps' Saint-Gotthard mountain range. At the opening ceremony, a school bus was the first vehicle to traverse the tunnel, which had taken 10 years to build and had cost US$486,000,000 and the lives of 19 workers. In that the tunnel was toll-free, detractors joked that "The Italians built it, the Germans use it and the Swiss pay for it."
- In Spain, the first hypermarket, Hipercor, was inaugurated on September 5, 1980, opening in Seville.

== September 6, 1980 (Saturday) ==
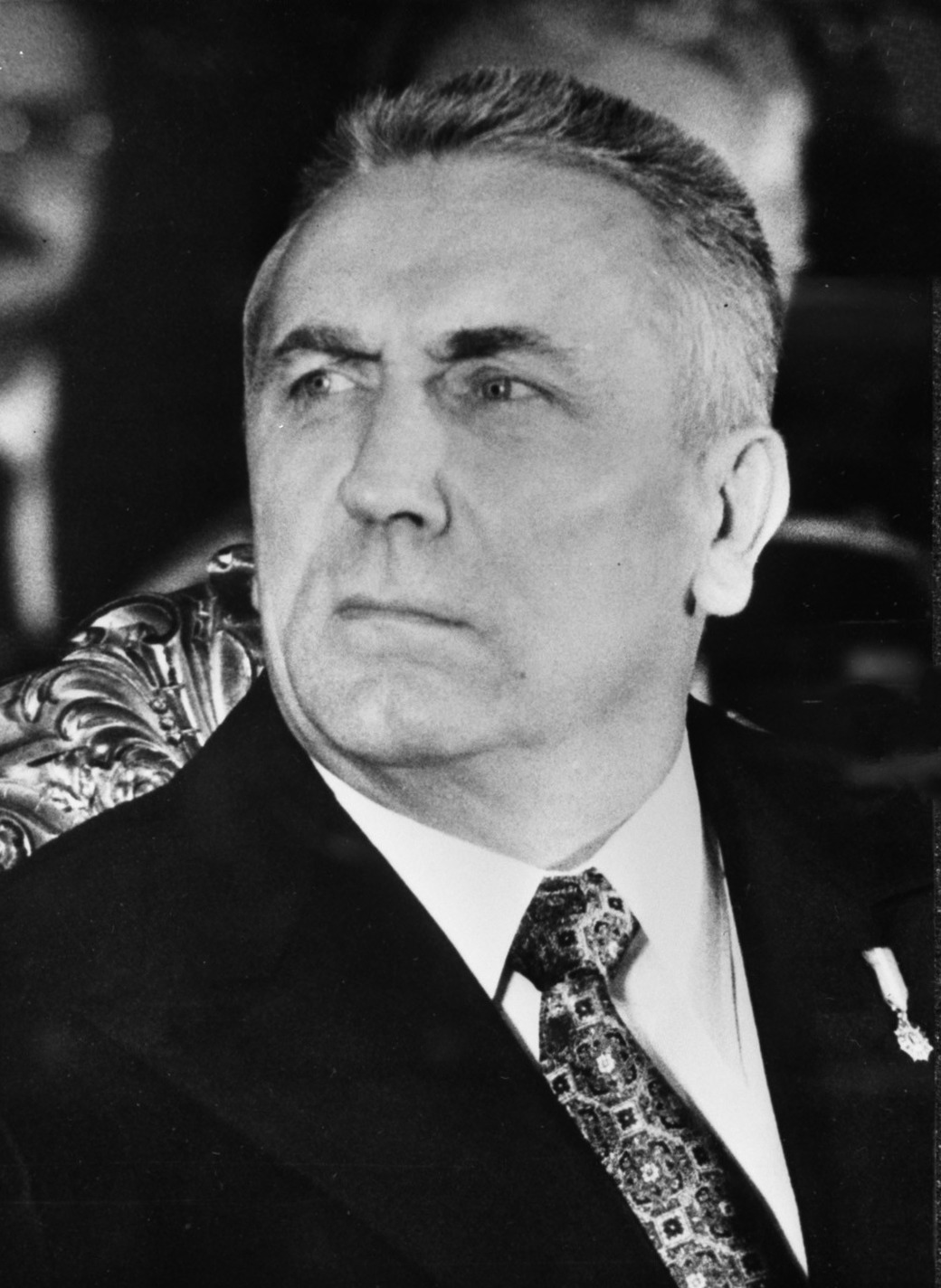
Gierek

- Edward Gierek, the de facto leader of Poland for almost a decade since becoming the First Secretary of the ruling Polish United Workers' Party (PZPR), was removed from office by the Party's Central Committee after the concessions made by the government to the Solidarność trade union. The day before, the government reported that Gierek had been admitted to a hospital for a heart ailment, and followed at 1:30 in the morning with the announcement. In a fashion similar to the 1970 dismissal of Gierek's predecessor in 1970 (and common in Communist nations at the time), the official statement said that Gierek had asked to be relieved of his responsibilities for health reasons. Gierek would live until 2001. The Party named Stanisław Kania, a member of the PZPR Politburo, as Gierek's successor.
- Born:
  - Samuel Peter, Nigerian professional boxer, billed as "The Nigerian Nightmare"; WBC world heavyweight champion for seven months in 2008; in the Akwa Ibom State
  - Joseph Yobo, Nigerian soccer football center and national team member from 2001 to 2014; in Kono, Rivers State

== September 7, 1980 (Sunday) ==
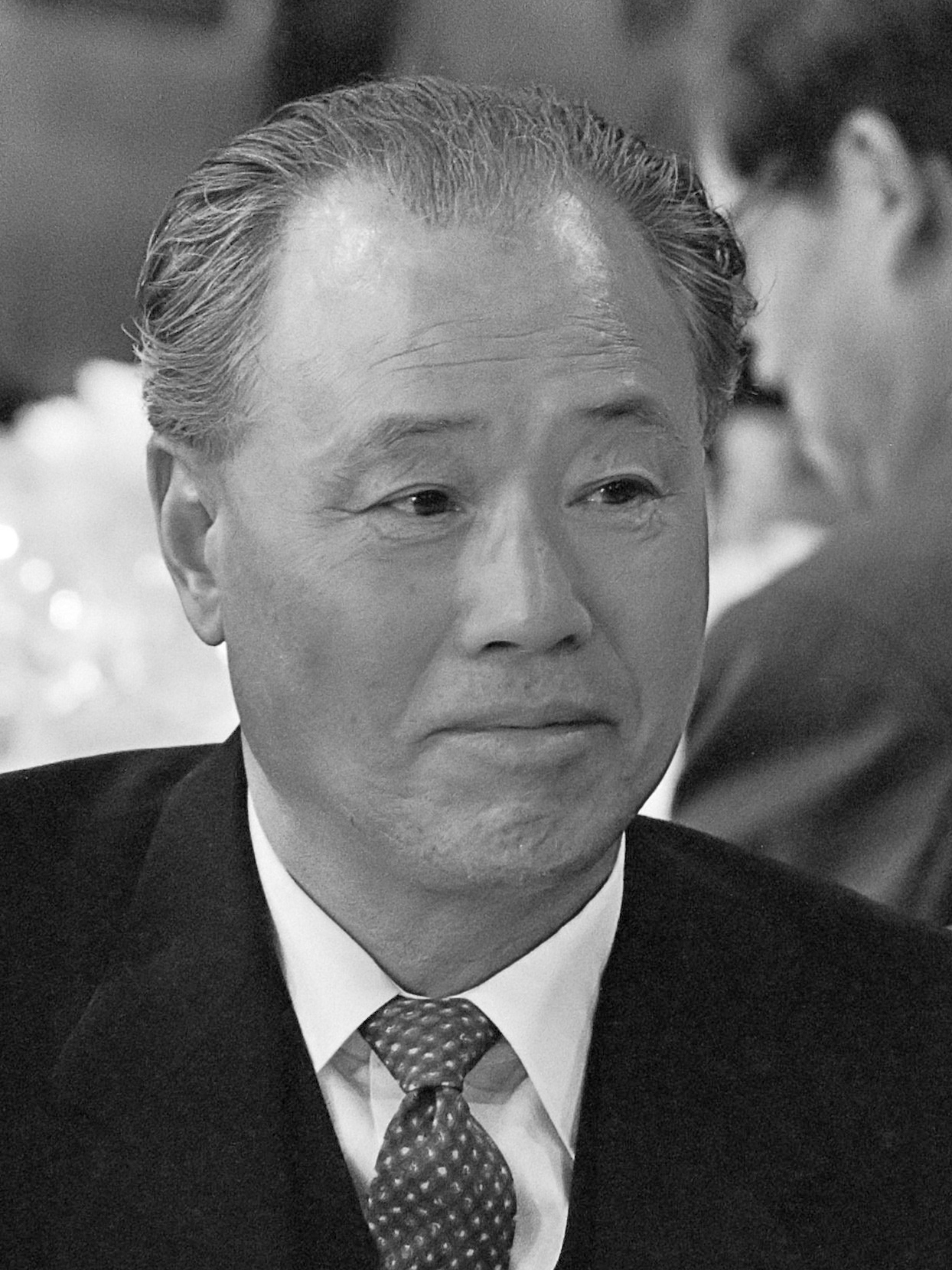
Zhao

- Hua Guofeng resigned from the position as Premier of the People's Republic of China, which he had held since 1976, in what one reporter described as "China's most orderly transfer of administrative authority in this century." In his resignation speech, made at the meeting of the National People's Congress in Beijing, Hua (who remained the Chairman of the Chinese Communist Party), asked the delegates to approve Zhao Ziyang as his replacement.
- In his speech, Chairman Hua also announced that the experimental one-child policy, used by individual cities since 1979, would be mandated nationwide "so that the rate of population growth may be brought under control as soon as possible", implementing what one reporter described as "the most ambitious population-control policy ever adopted by a major power."
- The 32nd Primetime Emmy Awards were held in Pasadena, California, but 51 of the 52 nominated actors did not show up for the U.S. television awards. The boycott by celebrities came during the ongoing strike by members of the Screen Actors Guild (SAG) and the American Federation of Television and Radio Artists (AFTRA). The only exception to the actors' boycott was Powers Boothe, who won the award for "Outstanding Actor in a Dramatic Special". Booth, who received a standing ovation, said in his acceptance speech, "This is either the most courageous moment of my career or the stupidest."
- John McEnroe, who had lost to Björn Borg in July in a close match at Wimbledon, defeated Borg in the finals of the U.S. Open of tennis in another close match that came down to the final set. McEnroe had won the first two sets, 7-6 and 6–1, and Borg tied by winning the next two sets, 7-6 and 7–5. McEnroe defended his 1979 U.S. Open championship in the final set, winning 6 games to 4.
- Born:
  - Nikki Jamal, Azerbaijani-born English pop music singer for the duo Ell & Nikki; as Nigar Mutallibzadeh in Baku, Azerbaijan SSR, Soviet Union.
  - Gabriel Milito, Argentine soccer football defender; in Bernal

== September 8, 1980 (Monday) ==
- In the largest troop maneuvers on German soil since the end of World War II, both the United States and other North Atlantic Treaty Organization (NATO) allies commenced war games in West Germany while the Soviet Union and its Warsaw Pact allies did the same in East Germany. NATO's "Autumn Forge" exercise involved more than 250,000 troops from 11 nations in land, air and sea operations and was coordinated from RAF Gütersloh. Approximately 200 miles (320 km) away in Potsdam, at least 40,000 troops from 7 nations conducted similar operations as part of the Warsaw Pact's "Brothers in Arms 80" maneuvers.
- The United States and China reached an agreement to begin regular commercial airline flights between the two nations for the first time since 1949, when the People's Republic of China was proclaimed. On December 7, Pan American World Airways (Pan Am) would become the first U.S. airline to land in China under the new agreement, with the arrival of Pan Am Flight 10, a Boeing 747, in Beijing.
- The Sun, at the time Britain's highest circulating newspaper, became the first to reveal the romance of Prince Charles and Lady Diana Spencer, with the headline "HE'S IN LOVE AGAIN! LADY DI IS THE NEW GIRL FOR CHARLES?"
- Died:
  - Willard Libby, 71, American chemist who perfected the development of radiocarbon dating that determined the approximate age of archaeological and palaeontological finds; 1960 laureate of the Nobel Prize in Chemistry
  - Keith Muckelroy, 29, British maritime archaeologist, from a diving accident

== September 9, 1980 (Tuesday) ==
- All 44 people aboard the British freighter MV Derbyshire were killed when the ship sank in heavy waves brought by Typhoon Orchid. The 91,655 ton ship is the largest British vessel to ever be lost at sea. No distress signal was sent and although there were no surviving witnesses to the sinking, and independent investigator concluded that the typhoon was capable of generating waves as high as 30 metres (98 ft) that would also have destroyed the hatch covers to allow water to enter
- The GOES 4 (Geostationary Operational Environmental Satellite) was launched into geostationary orbit for weather forecasting in the U.S., and later in Europe. On November 8, 1988, GOES-4 would become the first satellite to be sent into the higher "graveyard orbit" to reduce its chances of a collision with operational spacecraft.
- Born:
  - Michelle Williams, American TV, film and stage actress; in Kalispell, Montana
  - Denise Quiñones, Puerto Rican actress and 2001 Miss Universe winner; in Ponce
- Died:
  - John Howard Griffin, 60, white American journalist who had ingested medicines to temporarily darken his skin in order to get a first-hand view of the disparate treatment of African-Americans in 1959, then published his findings in the 1960 bestselling book Black Like Me; from complications of diabetes.
  - Manzoor Ali Khan, 58, Pakistani singer of Sindhi music in the Gwalior gharana style
  - Everett Clarke, 68, former radio actor who had played the title role in The Whistler and served as narrator for NBC University Theater of the Air, was stabbed to death in his office at the Fine Arts Building in Chicago, where he served as a drama teacher. A witness working on the same floor had heard Clarke pleading "No, Paul, no!" followed by a scream, but had assumed it was an improvisation between Clarke and an acting student. A homicide investigator commented, "I guess she figured it was good acting." Clarke's former student, Paul DeWitt, confessed to the crime the next day.

== September 10, 1980 (Wednesday) ==
- The People's Republic of China enacted the Communist nation's first income tax law since the 1949 Revolution, as legislation adopted by the National People's Congress. The taxes, applied differently for urban and rural individuals and commercial income earners, played a positive role in adjusting personal income level and increased national fiscal revenue. The proposed tax law had been announced on September 2.
- China also made further changes in its marriage law, superseding comprehensive reforms made on April 30, 1950.
- In India, Mangalore University opened in the Mangalore suburb of Konaje in the Karnataka state.

== September 11, 1980 (Thursday) ==
- A referendum on a new constitution was held in Chile on the seventh anniversary of the 1973 coup d'état that installed a military government led by Augusto Pinochet. The new constitution, approved by a 54% to 46% margin on a yes/no vote, provided for Pinochet to legally have broad powers and to serve an eight-year term during a transition from military to civilian rule.
- Australia's Prime Minister Malcolm Fraser announced that new elections for the House of Representatives and the Senate would take place on October 18.
- Died: Felix Garcia Rodriguez, 41, an attaché with the Cuban Permanent Mission to the United Nations, became "the first United Nations official to have been assassinated in New York City since the founding of the world organization" in 1945. Garcia was on the Queens Boulevard service road near 58th Street in Queens when three bullets were fired at him from a parked car. The anti-Castro terrorist organization Omega 7 took responsibility for the murder.

== September 12, 1980 (Friday) ==
- Turkish Army General Kenan Evren led a military coup and overthrow of the government of Turkey. General Evren, Chairman of the General Staff of the Turkish Armed Forces, announced the takeover in Ankara on Turkish state radio at 4:15 in the morning, local time (0315 UTC) and said that 118 senior government officials, including Prime Minister Suleyman Demirel and the opposition leader, former prime minister Bülent Ecevit, had been arrested and taken to Istanbul (they were freed on October 11). General Ali Haydar Saltik was announced as the head of government, serving as the Secretary General of the military junta, referred to as the "National Security Council". Military commanders were appointed to govern Turkey's 67 provinces and the Turkish constitution was suspended.
- All 34 people aboard Florida Commuter Airlines Flight 65 were killed when the twin-engine Douglas DC-3 plunged into the Atlantic Ocean near Grand Bahama Island. At 8:35 p.m., the plane took off from West Palm Beach, Florida, with 30 passengers and a crew of four and was bound for Freeport in the Bahamas. Less than half an hour later, about 25 miles (40 km) west of Freeport, Flight 65 flew into a heavy thunderstorm and plunged into the sea, where 16 bodies were recovered.
- The island of Tobago, the lesser-populated and smaller part of the two main islands of the Republic of Trinidad and Tobago, was granted self-government for the first time since it had joined Trinidad in becoming independent in 1962.
- Born: Yao Ming, Chinese professional basketball center and inductee in the Naismith Memorial Basketball Hall of Fame; in Shanghai
- Died: Lillian Randolph, 81, African-American film, radio and television actress on The Great Gildersleeve and on Amos 'n' Andy

== September 13, 1980 (Saturday) ==
- Dr. Kurt Semm of Kiel University in Germany performed the first minimally invasive appendectomy, pioneering laparoscopic surgery for many hospital operations.
- A free concert by Elton John at New York's Central Park attracted 400,000 fans. The event on the Great Lawn, a three-hour set which began at 4:00 p.m. (after an opener by Judie Tzuke), was a fundraiser for the New York City Department of Parks and Recreation, which said that the crowd was the largest ever in Central Park, exceeding more than 300,000 who appeared for a concert by James Taylor in 1979.
- The crash of a Saudi Arabian Air Force transport killed all 89 soldiers and crew aboard. The C-130 Hercules transport caught fire during its approach to landing at Medina and crashed into the desert.
- The Rocky Horror Show, a West End theatre musical which had premiered in London on June 19, 1973, closed after 2,960 performances.
- Born:
  - Ben Savage, American TV actor, in Chicago
  - Daisuke Matsuzaka, Japanese professional baseball pitcher in the Japanese and U.S. major leagues; in Aomori
- Died: Franco Giuseppucci, 33, Italian crime boss of the Banda della Magliana, was shot and killed by a hitman who rode up to his car on a motorbike and fired.

== September 14, 1980 (Sunday) ==
- In Damascus, Ignatius Zakka I was enthroned as the new Patriarch of Antioch and leader of the Syriac Orthodox Church and its more than 900,000 adherents. Zakka succeeded Ignatius Jacob III, who had died on June 26. Born in Iraq as Sanharib Iwas, he would reign over Syria's Orthodox Christians until 2014.
- Died: Gérald Fauteux, 79, Chief Justice of Canada from 1970 to 1973.

== September 15, 1980 (Monday) ==
- Lieutenant General Peter Walls, the white co-commander of the Zimbabwean Army, was fired by Prime Minister Robert Mugabe for disloyalty after an August television interview in the United Kingdom where he said that the election of Mugabe before independence had been tainted. Walls had previously been commander of the all-white Rhodesian Army before Zimbabwe was granted independence as a black majority nation.
- Born: Jolin Tsai, Taiwanese pop music singer; in Xinzhuang
- Died: Jim Tyrer, 41, U.S. pro football player and former lineman for the Kansas City Chiefs, shot his 40-year-old wife Martha, and then himself, in a murder suicide.

== September 16, 1980 (Tuesday) ==
- The international use of disinformation reached a new level as an authentic-looking forgery of a U.S. presidential memorandum, ultimately traced to the Soviet Union, reached news outlets in the United States. The 13-page forgery, labeled "Presidential Review Memorandum/NSC46", dated March 17, 1978 and bearing the signature of U.S. national security adviser Zbigniew Brzezinski, bore the title Black Africa and U.S. Black Movement and was marked "secret". According to the contents, the National Security Council had recommended "federal surveillance of American blacks with links to liberation movements in Africa", and a White House spokesman addressed the issue that evening. The next morning, U.S. presidential press secretary Jody Powell held a press conference and distributed copies of the cover page of the actual NSC46, dated May 4, 1979 and titled U.S. Policies Toward Central America and said that the forged document was "fabricated with some skill and disseminated in a calculated and orchestrated manner" to two African-American media outlets in New York, radio station WBLS-FM and the newspaper The Amsterdam News.
- Died: Jean Piaget, 84, Swiss developmental psychologist; his educational approach is Piaget's theory of cognitive development

== September 17, 1980 (Wednesday) ==
- Former President of Nicaragua Anastasio Somoza Debayle was assassinated 15 months after he fled to exile in Paraguay. Somoza had invested in farmland and was scheduled to travel there the next day for a month-long stay, but had a final appointment at a bank before leaving. A Sandinista team of four men and three women carried out "Operation Reptile" in Asunción, tracking Somoza and waiting for him to be driven from his home by his chauffeur Cesar Gallardo, with four Paraguayan policemen following him. At 10:08 in the morning, as Somoza was passing through a residential neighborhood on Avenida España., a stolen pickup truck cut in front of his Mercedes and blocked him at the intersection with Avenida América. Three men in the truck were joined by two more from the house on the corner and fired automatic weapons (striking Somoza with 19 bullets). After shooting the chauffeur, Hugo Irurzún fired a rocket propelled grenade and destroyed the limousine. In addition to Somoza and Gallardo, the assassins had killed Somoza's financial consultant, Jose Baittiner, who had been riding along for the appointment at the bank. Iruzun was killed the next day in a shootout with Paraguayan police.
- The first vote of confidence since the restoration of democracy in Spain was held in the Congress of Deputies, and the new government of Prime Minister Adolfo Suárez was given narrow approval, 180 to 164.
- Iraq's President Saddam Hussein announced to the Iraqi Parliament that the 1975 border accord with Iran was "null and void". The Republic of Iraq and the Kingdom of Iran had signed an accord on March 16, 1975, allowing Iran partial control of the Shatt al-Arab, the combined estuary of the Tigris and Euphrates rivers, in return for Iran's agreement to discontinue support to Iraq's Kurdish rebels.

== September 18, 1980 (Thursday) ==
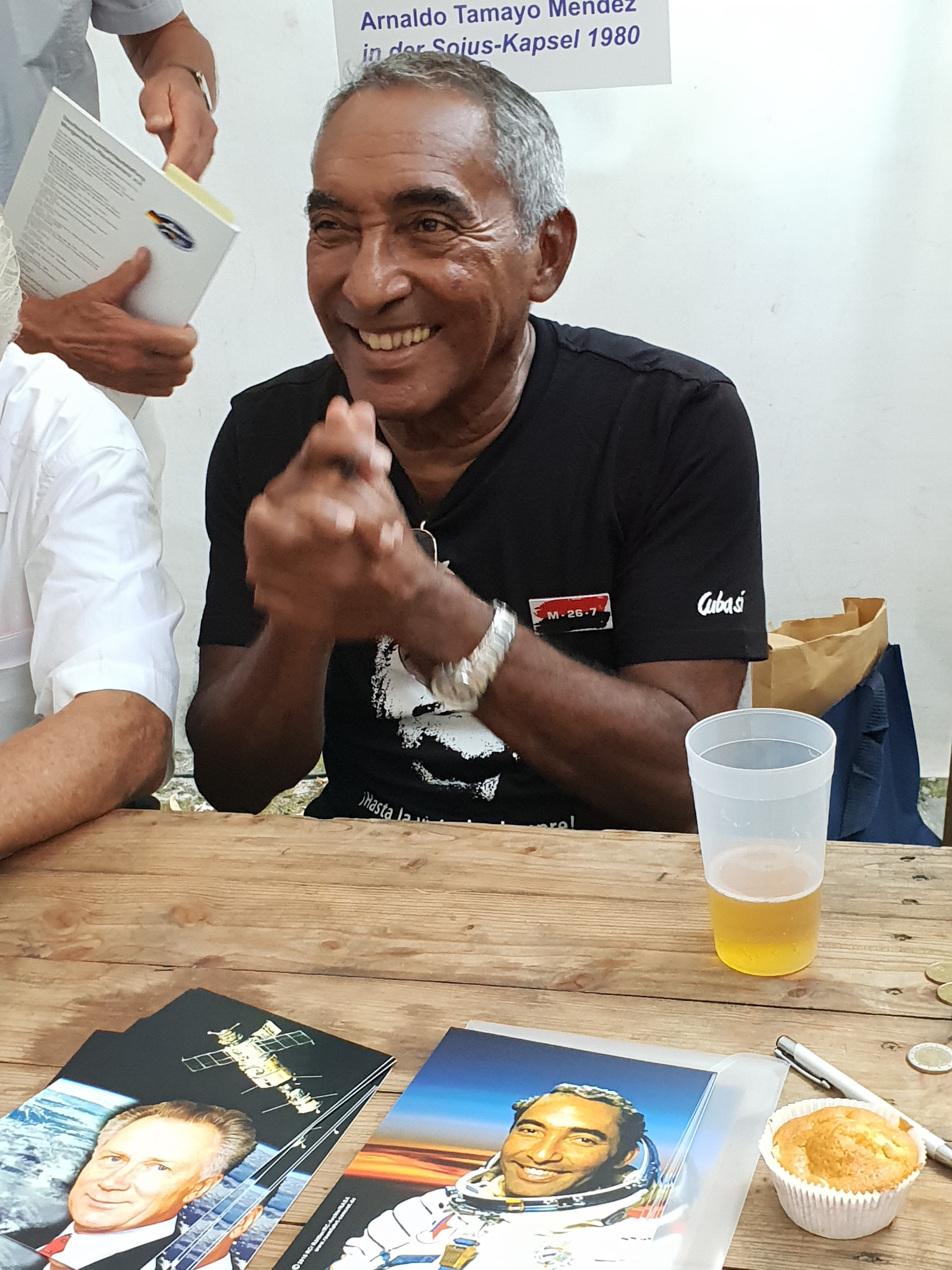
Arnaldo Tamayo, pictured in 2018

- Arnaldo Tamayo Mendez of Cuba became the first person of African descent to travel into space, as well as the first Cuban cosmonaut, as he and Yuri V. Romanenko were launched on Soyuz 38 to the Salyut 6 space station. The flight was the seventh in the Soviet Union's Interkosmos program, which trained cosmonauts from Soviet allies.
- Died: Katherine Anne Porter, 90, American journalist and novelist whose book Ship of Fools was the best selling novel of 1962 in the U.S.

== September 19, 1980 (Friday) ==
- The explosion of the fuel tank of a Titan II missile occurred at a missile silo near Damascus, Arkansas one day after a workman had accidentally dropped a ratchet while working on maintenance. At 3:01 in the morning, the missile exploded, killing U.S. Air Force Sergeant David Livingston and injuring 21 airmen. The blast also hurled an unarmed, nine megaton nuclear warhead, 200 yards from the silo.
- The Indian state of Bihar, led by Chief Minister Jagannath Mishra, made Urdu a second official language for that state in addition to Hindi as part of a campaign promise that had been made by Mishra. At the time, Urdu, spoken by India's Muslims, had only been official in the state of Jammu and Kashmir. Following Bihar's action, four additional Indian states gave official status to Urdu.
- In a bout for the World Boxing Council (WBC) bantamweight title, champion Lupe Pintor of Mexico faced contender and European bantamweight champ Johnny Owen of Wales at the Olympic Auditorium in Los Angeles. In the first eight rounds, Owen appeared to have the advantage. With 25 seconds left in the 12th round, however, Owen was knocked down (for the first time in his career) by a short right punch and as he attempted to get up, Pintor struck Owen with a left uppercut knockout punch. Owen never regained consciousness, and was rushed from the auditorium to California Hospital Medical Center, where he underwent emergency brain surgery. Owen lived for 46 days before dying on November 4.
- Died: Sol Lesser, 90, American film producer best known for his series of Tarzan films between 1943 and 1958

== September 20, 1980 (Saturday) ==
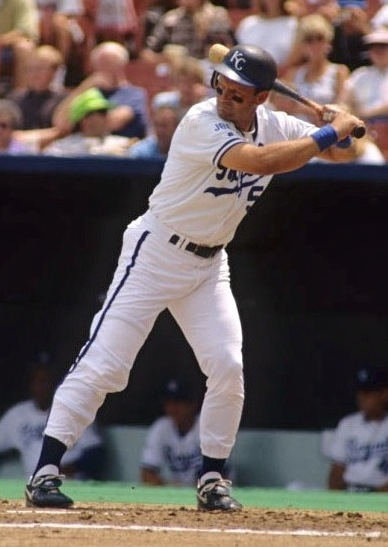
George Brett in 1990

- George Brett of the Kansas City Royals fell out of contention for being the first major league baseball player since 1941 to have a .400 batting average in a season, going hitless in four at-bats during a 9–0 loss to the visiting Oakland A's. Going into the game, he had been at ".3995037— which rounds out to .400" (based on 161 hits in 403 times at bat) before dropping to .396 (161 hits in 407 at bats or .3955774) He crossed the 40% threshold again Ultimately, Brett finished the regular season with a batting average of .390, still the highest in major league history since Ted Williams had hit .401 in 1941. As of 2020, only one player (Tony Gwynn, who batted .394 in 1994) has come close to the 40 percent mark.
- Ken Osmond a Los Angeles Police Department motorcycle officer and former child television actor who portrayed Eddie Haskell on Leave It to Beaver, survived being struck by five bullets while in a foot chase after a suspected car thief. Osmond was protected from four of the bullets by his bullet-resistant vest, with the fifth bullet ricocheting off his belt buckle.

== September 21, 1980 (Sunday) ==
- The world's largest airport passenger terminal began operations, three days after the dedication of the William B. Hartsfield Atlanta International Airport with 50 acres of square footage and the capacity to handle 55,000,000 passengers per year. The complex was "two mirror-image main terminals that are joined back-to-back to form one building", with four parallel concourses connected to the building by underground trains and moving sidewalks.
- In the United States, the League of Women Voters hosted the first of two presidential debates, but U.S. President Jimmy Carter refused to participate because third-party candidate John B. Anderson had been included. With Carter absent, Anderson and Republican nominee Ronald Reagan appeared in Baltimore and before a national television audience. A Carter versus Reagan debate would take place on October 28, seven days before the 1980 U.S. presidential election.
- The Intelligence Oversight Act was signed into law by President Carter, requiring U.S. government agencies to report covert actions to the intelligence committees of both the U.S. Senate and the U.S. House of Representatives.
- Nine days after the overthrow of the government in Turkey, former Admiral Bülent Ulusu became prime minister and formed a civilian government of 26 ministers (including seven other retired military officers). The cabinet also had 13 former government ministers, including Turgut Ozal, the only holdover from the cabinet of deposed Prime Minister Suleyman Demirel. Demirel and most of the former cabinet remained in detention.
- Religious services were broadcast on the radio in Poland for the first time since the 1947 foundation of the Communist-governed Polish People's Republic. The concessions were made by Poland's government as part of the August 31 agreement with striking shipyard workers.
- The New York Cosmos defeated the Fort Lauderdale Strikers, 3 to 0, at Soccer Bowl '80, the championship of the North American Soccer League, the premier professional league for U.S. soccer football. The game was played before 50,768 people at RFK Stadium in Washington, DC. Giorgio Chinaglia of Italy, the NASL's all-time leading scorer, made the last two goals.
- Born:
  - Kareena Kapoor Khan, Indian film actress and six-time Filmfare Award winner; in Mumbai
  - Autumn Reeser, American TV actress noted for starring in multiple Hallmark Channel romances; in La Jolla, California

== September 22, 1980 (Monday) ==
- The Iran–Iraq War began with a surprise attack by the Iraqi Air Force on 10 Iranian airfields, in an unsuccessful attempt to destroy most of Iran's combat aircraft. Air raids were made by 36 MiG-23 fighters and 92 other Iraqi planes on Tabriz, Hamadan, Dizful, Isfahan, Ahwaz, Agha Jari, Bushire, Abadan, and Shiraz, as well as Tehran's airport. At the same time, tanks rolled across the Iraq border into Iran's Kermanshah Province. The next day, ground troops crossed from Iraq into Iran in three simultaneous attacks and captured Iran's oil-rich Khuzestan Province at the north of the Persian Gulf. Two of the six divisions of the Iraqi Army began a siege of the cities of Abadan and Khorramshahr. Iran responded with the aerial bombing the same day of Iraqi bases at Hamedan and Bushehr. The war would last until August 20, 1988, at a loss of as many as 500,000 Iraqi troops, 600,000 Iranian troops and 100,000 civilians in the two nations marked by trench warfare, chemical attacks, and significant human and economic losses on both sides. It had geopolitical implications, with international powers taking sides, leaving a lasting impact on the region.
- Serial killer Joseph G. Christopher began the random murders of 12 African-American victims, by shooting a 14-year-old boy outside of a supermarket in Buffalo, New York. The next day, two black men were shot and killed within hours of each other, and a fourth victim was killed on September 23. Christopher, a paranoid schizophrenic who had been turned away earlier in the month from a psychiatric facility when he wanted to admit himself, joined the U.S. Army and stabbed two men in Buffalo while on furlough from Fort Benning in Georgia. His string of killings finally ended on January 18 when he was arrested at Fort Benning for trying to kill another black soldier. He received a 60-year prison sentence in 1982 after being convicted of three of the September shootings. Christopher would tell The Buffalo News in 1983 that he killed 13 people, all black men, because "that was the directive" from "a collection of people". Christopher would die of cancer in 1993 while in prison.
- Procter & Gamble took the Rely brand tampons off of the market after the Centers for Disease Control identified the product as more likely to cause toxic shock syndrome than any other product. The recall order and an order to halt production was made on order of P&G chairman Edward Harness. Since 1975, 652 women had been infected with toxic shock syndrome from use of tampons, and 63 of them had died.

== September 23, 1980 (Tuesday) ==
- The National Security Ordinance went into effect in India hours after it had been proclaimed that night by India's President Neelam Sanjiva Reddy. Promulgated as part of the President's emergency powers, the ordinance gave giving the national and the state governments broad authority for preventive detention" of citizens suspected of "acting in any manner prejudicial to the security of the State"; "acting in any manner prejudicial to the maintenance of Public order"; or "acting in any manner prejudicial to the maintenance of supplies and services essential to the community". Under the ordinance and the acts that followed on December 27, a person arrested could be detained in any designated facility anywhere in India.
- Tokyo's oldest daily newspaper, The Asahi Shimbun, became the first paper to be produced entirely by computer from the time of composing to being sent out for delivery. "From the moment reporters deliver their handwritten copy to keyboard operators to the time when bundles of papers wrapped in plastic drop into delivery trucks, The New York Times noted, "production is directed by computer." The process included allowing editors to revise the pages and the layout from their own computer terminals before having the images scanned to printing plates.
- In a referendum in the U.S. state of Maine, voters overwhelmingly rejected a proposal to close down the state's only nuclear reactor facility, the Maine Yankee Nuclear Power Plant. The election was the first in the United States since the 1979 meltdown of one of the Three Mile Island reactors in Pennsylvania. After the plant became too expensive to maintain, it would close in 1996.
- After weeks of strikes at the Lenin Shipyard in Gdańsk, Poland, the nationwide independent trade union Solidarity was established.
- Two days after being diagnosed with brain cancer, reggae singer Bob Marley performed his final concert, held at the Stanley Theater in Pittsburgh. On the morning of the next concert date in Philadelphia, a reporter noted, "If you were planning to see Bob Marley and the Wailers tonight, you should make new plans. The man's sick and at least the Philadelphia and Washington chunks of his tour are canceled." He would die less than eight months later on May 11, 1981.
- Died: Jim Fouché, 82, State President of South Africa from 1968 to 1975

== September 24, 1980 (Wednesday) ==
- William Lee Bergstrom made gambling history with a successful $777,000 cash wager on a roll of the dice at the craps table at the Horseshoe Casino in Las Vegas. The amount would be equivalent to almost $2.4 million in 2020.
- Born: Victoria Pendleton, British bicyclist, two-time Olympic gold medalist and six-time world champion; in Stotfold, Bedfordshire

== September 25, 1980 (Thursday) ==
- The Mariel boatlift, which had allowed boats from the United States to transport 125,262 people who were permitted to leave Cuba, came to an end. Cuban officials ordered the remaining U.S. boats in the port of Mariel to leave.
- Three days into its invasion of Iran, troops from neighboring Iraq captured the port of Khorramshahr, marching into the oil-exporting site after a two-day siege.
- A settlement was reached in the 67-day long strike by U.S. film and television actors, allowing production to begin again on TV shows.
- The United States retained yachting's America's Cup, winning for the 25th consecutive time since the international challenge had been started in 1851. Dennis Conner sailed the sloop Freedom, appearing for the U.S. and the New York Yacht Club, defeating Australia (and its yacht, Australia, skippered by James Hardy) in the fifth race of the best-of-seven series.
- Born: T.I. (stage name for Clifford Harris Jr.), American rap artist and record executive; in Atlanta
- Died:
  - John Bonham, 32, English musician and drummer for Led Zeppelin, died of pulmonary aspiration from vomiting and choking following the ingestion of over one liter of vodka in the 24 hours before his death.
  - Lewis Milestone (born Leib Milstein), 84, Russian-born American film director known for All Quiet on the Western Front, The Front Page, Of Mice and Men and Ocean's 11
  - Marie Under, 97, celebrated Estonian language poet
  - Saville Sax, 56, American spy

== September 26, 1980 (Friday) ==
- Thirteen people were killed and 225 injured by the explosion of a bomb planted by a right-wing terrorist at an Oktoberfest festival in Munich, West Germany. The dead included the person who had planted the bomb, 21-year-old University of Tübingen student Gundolf Köhler, a member of the neo-Nazi Wehrsportgruppe Hoffmann.
- A prototype of the Chinese Shanghai Y-10 airliner, comparable to a Boeing 707, made its first flight after ten years of planning. Because of political disagreements between the national Ministry of Aviation and the government of Shanghai, China's national airline (CAAC) refused to invest in the aircraft. CAAC had already purchased 10 Boeing 707 airplanes in 1972, and considered the design to be more than 20 years out of date.
- The Central Committee of the Chinese Communist Party issued a letter to its 38,000,000 members, and to the 50 million members of the Communist Youth League of China, ordering them to comply with the new nationwide one-child policy in order to set a good example, and directed the members to use "patient and painstaking persuasion" to educate non-members on the importance of birth control.
- Born:
  - Daniel Sedin, Swedish ice hockey winger who had 18 seasons with the Vancouver Canucks; 2011 Ted Lindsay Award and Art Ross Trophy winner; in Örnsköldsvik
  - Henrik Sedin, Swedish ice hockey center who had 18 seasons with the Vancouver Canucks; 2010 Hart Memorial Trophy and Art Ross Trophy winner; in Örnsköldsvik. The identical twin brothers were teammates in the NHL from 2000–01 to 2017–18.

== September 27, 1980 (Saturday) ==
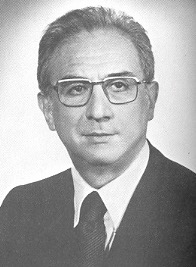
Cossiga, toppled by a single vote

- By a single vote, the economic proposals of Italy's Prime Minister Francesco Cossiga failed to win approval in Camara dei deputati, failing 297 to 298. At least 30 members of the governing Democrazia Cristiana (DC) party had previously stated that they would go against the economic proposals. Two DC members who had expressed support for Cossiga, and presumably would have potentially made the vote 299 to 298 in his favor, arrived several minutes too late to participate, including Mariapia Garavaglia. Fifteen minutes after the vote was announced, Prime Minister Cossiga announced his resignation along with his entire cabinet, which included a coalition of Socialists and Republicans. On October 18, Arnaldo Forlani was appointed prime minister and formed a new coalition.
- The Richmond Tigers defeated the Collingwood Magpies, 159 to 78, to win the Victorian Football League's Grand Final and the championship of Australian rules football. The match took place in front of 113,461 spectators at the Melbourne Cricket Ground.

== September 28, 1980 (Sunday) ==
- The Washington Post newspaper published the feature article "Jimmy's World" on its front page, a story by reporter Janet Cooke that began "Jimmy is 8 years old and a third-generation heroin addict, a precocious little boy with sandy hair, velvety brown eyes and needle marks freckling the baby-smooth skin of his thin brown arms." Copyrighted by the Post and reprinted by other newspapers, Cooke's story would win a Pulitzer Prize for feature writing on April 13, 1981. Two days later, Cooke admitted to executive editor Benjamin Bradlee that she had fabricated the story. In a telegram to the Pulitzer Prize Foundation, Bradlee returned the prize and wrote that Cooke had conceded "that her story about an 8-year-old-heroin addict was in fact a composite, that the quotes attributed to a child were in fact fabricated and that certain events described as eyewitnessed did not in fact happen."
- The first multiparty elections since 1968 in Panama were conducted as 79 candidates campaigned for the 19 directly elected seats of the 56 seat Executive Council of the National Assembly. The other 37 members were selected by the government as part of the National Assembly of Municipal Representatives. As a result, the Associated Press noted at the time, "The elections will not tip the balance of power regardless of who wins" and the pro-government municipal representatives would retain majority control even if the opposition won all 19 seats.

== September 29, 1980 (Monday) ==
- The reputation of Hu Feng, a disgraced former high-level Chinese official and a member of the Politburo of the Chinese Communist Party, was officially rehabilitated by order of the Party. Hu had been imprisoned from 1955 to 1979 as a "counter-revolutionary" after openly opposing Chairman Mao Zedong's policies on art and literature.
- Born: Zachary Levi, American TV and film actor; in Lake Charles, Louisiana

== September 30, 1980 (Tuesday) ==
- Eight days after the invasion by Iraq, the Iranian Air Force carried out the first attack in history against a nuclear reactor, damaging the almost-completed reactor at the Osirak nuclear research center. Four Iranian F-4 Phantom jets flew deep into Iraq at high altitude, then fired bombs and missiles in a preventive strike at the facility 10 miles (16 km) from the Iraqi capital of Baghdad. More than eight months later, Israel would destroy the reactor in its own preventive strike on June 7, 1981.
- Digital Equipment Corporation, Intel and Xerox introduced the DIX standard for Ethernet, which was the first implementation outside of Xerox and the first to support 10 megabit per second speeds.
- Born:
  - Martina Hingis, Slovak-born Swiss professional tennis player, singles champion at the Australian Open, Wimbledon and the U.S. Open and (from 1997 to 2001), the highest-paid female athlete in the world; in Košice, Czechoslovakia
  - Guillermo Rigondeaux, Cuban professional boxer, WBA bantamweight and super-bantamweight champion; in Santiago de Cuba
  - Virgil Abloh, Ghanaian-American fashion designer; in Rockford, Illinois (d. 2021)
