= Encroachment =

Encroachment is to advance beyond proper limits, and may refer to:

- Temporal encroachment
- Structural encroachment
- Encroachment (gridiron football), a penalty in American and Canadian football
- Encroachment by human populations on natural spaces that causes habitat fragmentation or habitat destruction
