= Ogunpa River =

River in Nigeria

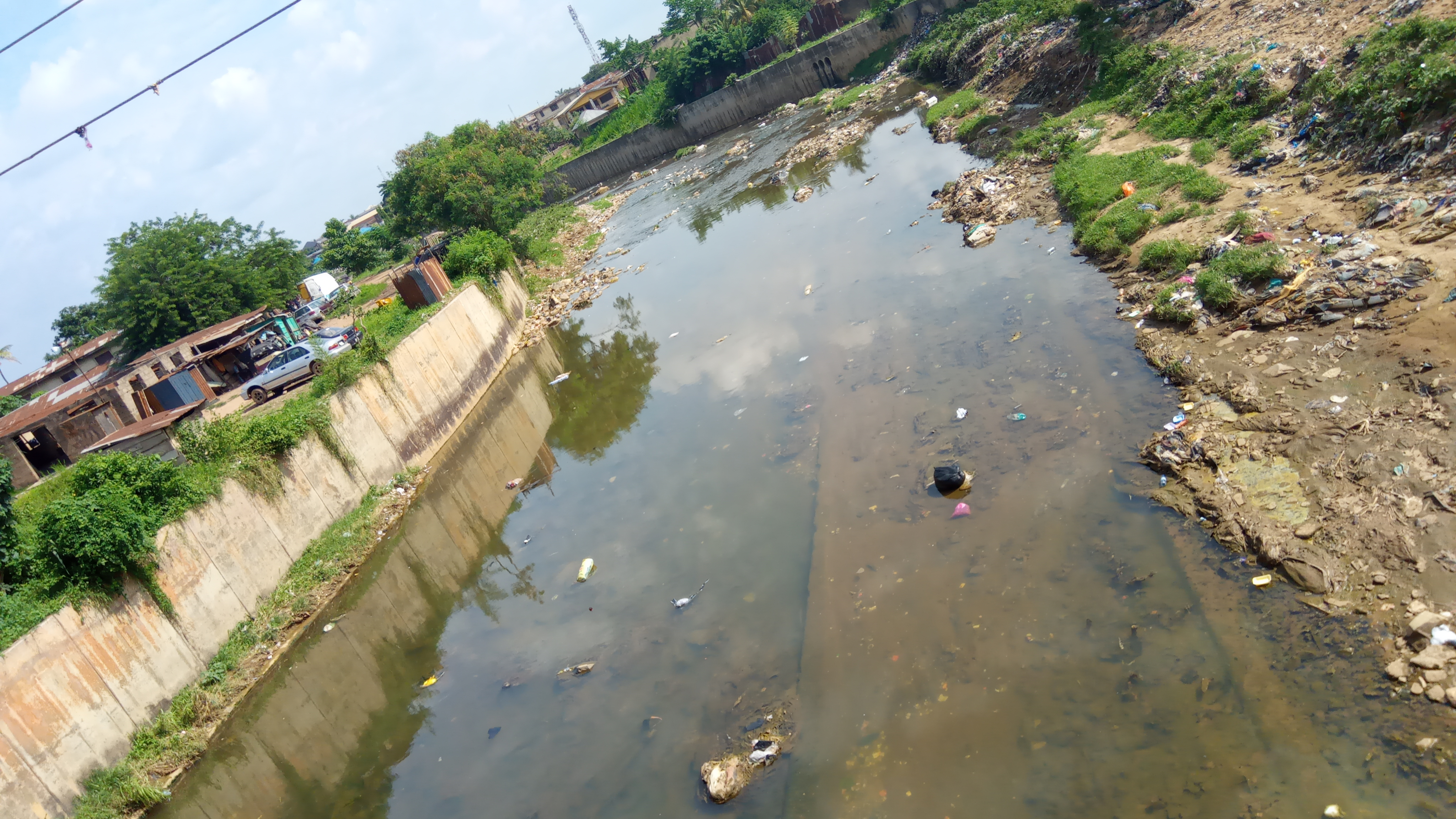
A picture of Ogunpa River in Ibadan

The Ogunpa River river system is a third-order stream with a channel length of 21.5 kilometres (13.4 mi) and a drainage basin covering 73.3 square kilometres (28.3 mi^{2}) draining the densely populated eastern part of Ibadan, Nigeria. The city of Ibadan in southwestern Nigeria (7º23’ N, 3º5’ E) is the largest urban centre in Africa south of the Sahara. Ogunpa River is known to contain 49 species of zooplankton.

== Hydrological Context ==
The Ogunpa River is part of a highly urbanized watershed within Ibadan, where rapid urban growth has significantly altered natural drainage patterns.

The river is one of the main drainage channels of the city and is highly responsive to rainfall events due to increased surface runoff from impervious urban surfaces.

== Public safety ==
Household waste is known to be dumped along the path of the Ogunpa. This sometimes results in disastrous consequences.

In 1960, more than 1,000 residents were rendered homeless when the Ogunpa River exceeded its banks. More than 500 houses were damaged in 1963 when the river again flooded the city. In 1978, official record confirmed that 32 bodies were retrieved from the ruins of the flood and more than 100 houses were destroyed.

The 1980 flood caused widespread destruction, with over 200 fatalities and more than 50,000 people displaced.

Similar extreme flood events were also recorded in 1963, 1978, and 2011, indicating a recurring flood hazard in the basin.

=== Disaster ===
It was, however, the flood of August 31, 1980 that gave the Ogunpa national and international notoriety. After about 10 hours of heavy downpour recorded as four times heavier than it was during the 1978 flood, the city of Ibadan was virtually left in ruins. More than 100 bodies were retrieved from the debris of collapsed houses and vehicles washed away by the deluge. Over 200 people died and over 50,000 were left homeless.

== Pollution ==
Ibadan is one of many key regions in the globe where managing solid waste poses a serious threat to the environment and the general public's health. The city, which has a population of over 3 million, produces a lot of waste every day, and the lack of a solid waste management system has caused illegal dumps to develop, waterways to get contaminated, and diseases to spread. The Ogunpa River, which flows through the city's core and is significantly polluted by solid waste, including plastics, bottles, and other non-biodegradable items, is one such example. The river, an important source of water for the community, has been poisoned as a result. And many people have been exposed to water-borne illnesses like cholera, typhoid, and dysentery.

== Causes of Flooding ==
Studies identify multiple anthropogenic and environmental causes of flooding in the Ogunpa basin:

- Encroachment into floodplains
- Blockage of drainage channels by solid waste
- Deforestation of surrounding areas
- Increased runoff due to urbanization

== Channelisation works ==
Following repeated flood disasters, government authorities implemented channelization and engineering modifications to increase the river’s hydraulic capacity.

In 1999, the Nigerian Government took over the "Channelisation Project" of the Ogunpa River. They had been bedeviled by series of problems since 1977. It was first started by the state government of Oyo State. To this end, a 10 billion naira contract was awarded to finish the channelisation of the Ogunpa.

Although the project was scheduled for completion in February 2003, some of the contractors working on the channelisation reportedly abandoned the site unfinished.

== Environmental Impact ==
Despite engineering interventions, flooding remains a major issue due to rapid urban growth and inadequate waste management systems.

Urbanization continues to increase flood risk by reducing natural water infiltration capacity.

=== See also ===
- Ibadan
- Flood control
- Urban drainage
- Ogunpa River
