= David Hoffmann =

David Hoffmann may refer to:

- David Hoffmann (bodybuilder) (born 1980), German bodybuilder
- David L. Hoffmann, American historian
- David Zvi Hoffmann (1843–1921), Orthodox rabbi and Torah scholar
- Dave Hoffmann (American football) (born 1970), American football player
- David Hoffman, businessman who owns the Hoffmann Family of Companies

== See also ==
- David Hoffman (disambiguation)
