= Hans Hoffmann (painter) =

German painter (1530–1591)

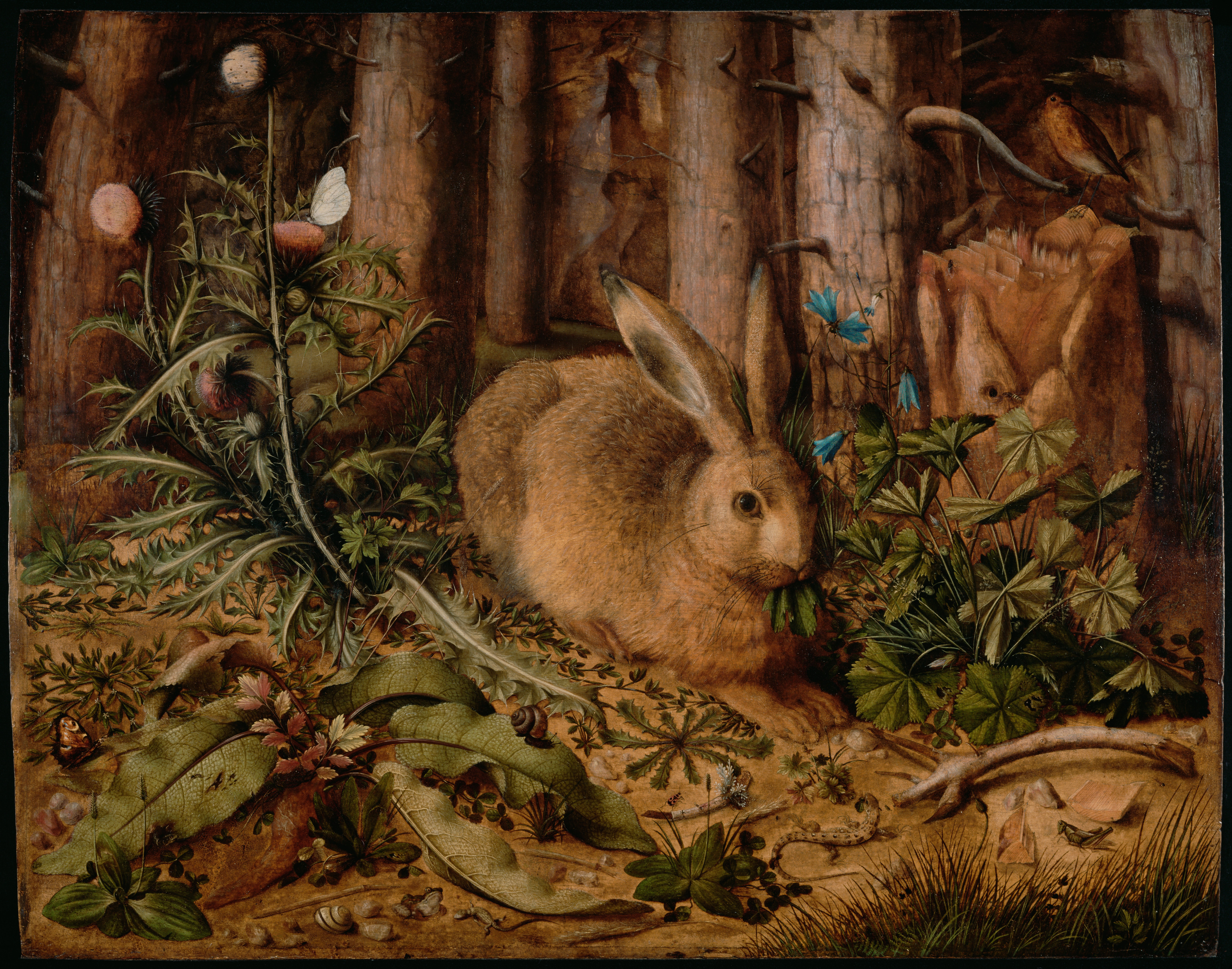
A Hare in the Forest. Oil on panel, circa 1585. J. Paul Getty Museum

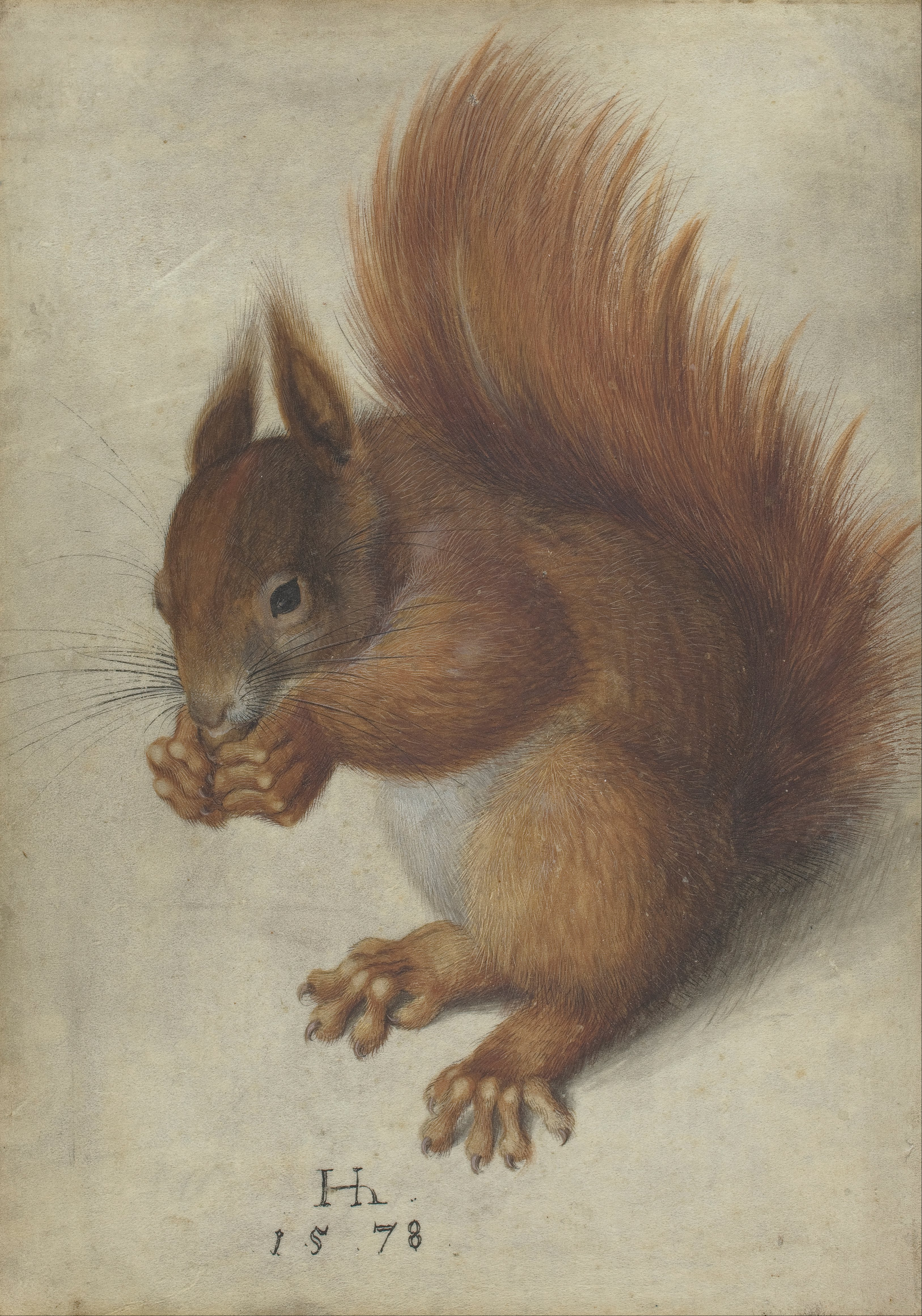
Red Squirrel (1578), watercolor on parchment, 32.5 x 25.6 cm. National Gallery of Art

Hans Hoffmann (c. 1530 in Nuremberg – 1591/92 in Prague) was a German painter and draftsman. A leading representative of the Dürer Renaissance, he specialised in watercolor and gouache nature studies, many of them copied from or based on Dürer's work.

== Biography ==
By 1576 he was living in Nuremberg, where he was mentioned in the records of the town-council meetings as the painter Hans Hoffmann, citizen of the town. He quickly became known for his copies after works by Albrecht Dürer.

In 1584 he went to Munich to work on behalf of William V, Duke of Bavaria. In 1585 he was appointed as a court painter by Rudolf II, Holy Roman Emperor, who brought him to the imperial court in Prague. At the imperial court, Hoffmann advised Rudolph on the development of his art collection and acquired for him works by Dürer.

The art collection assembled by the Nuremberg citizen Paulus Praun contained more than 100 works by Hans Hoffmann. Because the collection was intact until the beginning of the 19th century, many of these works are documented.
