= David Huffman (disambiguation) =

David Huffman (1945–1985) was an American actor.

David Huffman may also refer to:

- David A. Huffman (1925–1999), American computer scientist
- Dave Huffman (1957–1998), American football player
- David Huffman (artist) (born 1963), American painter and installation artist
