= Temporal encroachment =

Action affecting perception of time\

Temporal encroachment is an action that affects the perception of time or that affects the ability to take action in the future. Temporal means related to the measurement or passing of time and encroachment is an intrusion, usually unwelcome, into the space of another.

The space that temporal encroachment refers to is temporal space, the temporal "space" or "territory" upon which others attach significance.

There are various kinds of temporal encroachment:

== Scheduling ==
This is when one group or person delays another person. A good example is a vice president making a lower-ranked employee wait in his outer office while he conducts business. Another good example is a valued worker who always shows up late to work but this is allowed due to his abilities. This kind of encroachment is very common in the workplace. Various cultures look at this differently—the Japanese are very punctual, while most Latin and Baltic cultures would be more relaxed with time, instead looking at social parameters.

== Future 'space' ==
This refers to actions taken that influence events 'down the line', narrowing possible choices and alternatives. The most common use of this phrase is found in ecology, where there is a large amount of concern about the effects of human encroachment upon animals and other wildlife. Encroachment can be a good or bad factor in the lives of the animals, but most commonly, it is bad.

It has been used by some Jewish thinkers to refer to changes in Zionism that have 'ripple effects' on Jews worldwide, and the effect this has had on global terrorism.

It has also been used in the legal system, where some legal thinkers believe early correction of poverty and other socioeconomic ills can 'narrow' the likelihood of future criminality.

== Past 'space' ==
It can also reflect a sense that modern events and interpretations of history alter and change our perceptions of history. For example, the involvement of the Papacy in the formation of the structure of medieval Europe was viewed differently at the time than it is today.

Some also view it as the encroachment of the young on the old, see Encroachment of old age below.

== Examples ==
Some examples of temporal encroachment in other contexts.

Encroachment from flooding: Construction of settlements in flood plains, ignoring the tendency of rivers to flood occasionally, results in situations in which river water encroaches on properties in ways that can prove extremely costly. Here encroachment on flood plains by buildings engenders encroachment by flooding.

Encroachment from rising sea levels: This is a more dramatic and permanent example of encroachment from flooding whose major effects are predicted to become evident over the coming decades. It is caused by failure to respond effectively to the challenge of global warming and rising carbon emissions. Here encroachment on air quality engenders encroachment by rising sea levels.

Encroachment by disease resistant bacteria: The widespread development and use of pharmaceutical drugs to control disease has created a situation in which bacteria are mutating and treatment-resistant bacteria are becoming a major challenge to hospitals. Here encroachment by progressive pharmaceutical response to disease engenders encroachment by bacterial resistance to those treatments.

Encroachment from population pressure: This widely documented phenomenon is associated with the ever-increasing use of non-renewable resources. Here encroachment by increasing population (and reproductive rights) engenders encroachment by the demands on resources which there is a reasonable probability cannot be fulfilled and will therefore engender a violent and unreasonable response.

Encroachment of old age: The process of ageing, and terminal illness, may be experienced as encroaching shadows on human dignity. Equally, while near the peak of their careers, people may note the encroachment of youth and change.

== Other uses ==
In medical terminology, a temporal encroachment has to do with bones in the skull pressing tightly against the brain after an injury to the head.

In computer science, a temporal key that is improperly validatated is considered a temporal encroachment.
