= Dariusz Hoffmann =

Polish YouTuber

- Occupations: Entertainer, educator, YouTuber, IT specialist

YouTube information
- Channels: SciFun; Tube Raiders
- Years active: 2011–present
- Genres: Popular science (Sci Fun); Travel vlog (Tube Raiders); Urban exploration (Tube Raiders)
- Subscribers: 1,240,000 (SciFun); 345,000 (Tube Raiders)
- Views: 249,000,000 (SciFun); 21,000,000 (Tube Raiders)
- Last updated: 13 January 2026

Dariusz Hoffmann (Polish: [ˈda.rjuʂ ˈxɔf.man]) is a Polish educator and entertainer, publishing popular science educational videos on his YouTube channel, titled SciFun. Created in 2011, it is one of the most popular Polish-language science channels on the platform, with videos dedicated to among others, scientific facts and trivia, experiments, and analysis and debunking of pseudoscientific content. In January 2026, it had 1.24 million subscribers. Together with his brother, Marek Hoffmann, he also hosts YouTube channel Tube Raiders, where they publish travel and urban exploration vlogs, which in January 2026, had 345,000 subscribers.

== Biography ==
Dariusz Hoffmann was born and grew up in Poznań, Poland. He has a degree in the information technology.

He created a Polish-language popular science channel SciFun on YouTube in 2011. He began publishing videos on it in early 2012, after the success of his popular science blog, titled Nietuzinkowy Blog Naukowy (lit. 'Unconventional Science Blog'). In his videos, he talks about scientific facts and trivia, conducts experiments, and analyses and debunks pseudoscientific content. He also created miniseries such as videos dedicated to debunking modern flat Earth beliefs, and a documentary series dedicated to the Titan submersible, and its implosion in 2023, during an expedition to view the wreck of the Titanic. SciFun is one of the most popular Polish-language popular science channels on YouTube, having over 1.24 million subscribers and over 249 million views on its videos, as of January 2026.

In 2017, Hoffmann was invited to the European Astronaut Centre in Cologne, Germany, a branch of the European Space Agency. Together with five other internet influencers from European countries, he underwent training, culminating in a parabolic flight in a reduced-gravity aircraft. The event was organized as part of the Andromeda Initiative, in cooperation between the European Space Agency and Electronic Arts, to promote the release of action role-playing video game Mass Effect: Andromeda.

His older brother, Marek Hoffman, is also a YouTuber, operating the channel AdBuster, where he posts videos about brand management, product reviews, and vlogs. In January 2026, it had around 1.3 million subscribers, and over 265 million views. In 2013, they created together a YouTube channel titled Tube Raiders, where they publish travel and urban exploration vlogs. In January 2026, it had around 345,000 subscribers, and over 21 million views. In 2016, Dariusz Hoffman was nominated in two categories for the Grand Video Award, in popular science category for the SciFun video Liczba galaktyk w ziarnku piasku (lit. 'The Number of Galaxies in a Grain of Sand'), and in hobby category, for the Tube Raiders video Umocnienia helskie (lit. 'Hel Fortifications').

== Awards and nominations ==
Ceremony	Year	Category	Nominated work	Result	Ref.
Grand Video Awards	2016	Hobby	Umocnienia helskie	Nominated	
Grand Video Awards	2016	Popular Science	Liczba galaktyk w ziarnku piasku	Nominated	
