= David Francis Hoffman =

American criminal (born 1946)

David Francis Hoffman (born 1946) is an American criminal known for the brutal murder and dismemberment of his wife, Carol Stebbins, in 1980. The murder occurred after the relationship between the married couple began to deteriorate and the introduction of Hoffman's mother, Helen Ulvinen, into their home. Hoffman was found guilty of murder by the first degree under the pre-1990 Minnesota law, and given a life sentence with the possibility of parole after 17 years. Hoffman's mother was also found guilty of the same crime but the decision was overturned a year later in the Minnesota Supreme Court

== Origins ==
David Francis Hoffmann was born in 1946 and attended North High School in Saint Paul, Minnesota. Whilst living in West Saint Paul, Minnesota, Hoffman eventually met his wife Carol Stebbins; the pair had two daughters, the first being born in 1971 and the second in 1977.

== Troubling relationship with wife ==
In the years leading up to the murder, Hoffman's relationship with his wife Carol Stebbins began to deteriorate. They had continually degraded as a couple since their marriage, often fighting in front of their children and having heated arguments in public. Various of Hoffman's co-workers at the time reportedly indicated that Hoffman would often complain to them about his relationship with Stebbins whilst at work. It has also been indicated that the complaints became more and more severe, eventually developing into somewhat detailed plans to one day kill Stebbins.

The relationship deteriorated further upon Hoffman's mother, Helen Ulvinen, coming to live in their home as a permanent babysitter for the children. Ulvinen and Stebbins reportedly did not get along, and Stebbins told friends about her disagreement with Ulvinen on many issues. As the deterioration of the Hoffman's marriage continued over the two-week period in which Ulvinen lived with the couple, Hoffman is reported to have shared his intentions to kill his wife with his mother. Ulvinen is said to have agreed with Hoffman's intentions to kill Stebbins, and the two began to conspire as to how the murder should be carried out.

== The crime ==
On August 10, 1980, David Francis Hoffman murdered his wife, Carol Stebbins. According to the facts of the court case that would follow, Hoffman and Stebbins had spent the day playing and spending time with their young children, whilst Hoffman's mother Ulvinen had been helping feed the children. Upon putting the children to sleep, Hoffman and Stebbins went up to their bedroom, where Hoffman attempted to initiate sexual intercourse with Stebbins, who refused. From here, Hoffman lost his temper and choked Stebbins to death.

Following this, Hoffman woke his mother and told her to sit on the living room couch so she would have a view of each of the children's bedroom doors, so if they were to awake she could deal with them and they would not wander upstairs to find their dead mother. From here, Hoffman moved Stebbins’ corpse to the bathroom, where he dismembered the body and placed the pieces in separate bags before attempting to dispose of the body through the garbage disposal and by burning. After realizing that this would not be viable, Hoffman drove the body to Weaver Lake and disposed of it.

Returning home, Hoffman told his mother to clean all the sheets whilst he washed the bathroom to clear away the evidence. Following this, the pair composed a story whereby Stebbins was said to have left the house following a heated argument with Hoffman. Hoffman called the police with a missing person's report the next day and during the interviews and searches that followed, Hoffman and Ulvinen both continued to tell the fabricated story.

On 19 August 1980, David Francis Hoffman came clean and confessed to the police about the murder of his wife. In his testimony, Hoffman admitted to the fact that he had told his friends and his mother that he had been planning on killing his wife for months or years. He also made clear the part that his mother had played in the murder and the ensuing cover-up. Hoffman was charged with first degree murder and sentenced to life in prison.

== Action against Helen Ulvinen ==
Ulvinen was also charged with first degree murder, as under Minnesota law, criminal liability can rest on someone who "intentionally aids, advises, hires, councils or conspires with or otherwise procures" to commit a crime. Upon appealing this decision on 17 December 1981, it was presented that despite the known hatred between Ulvinen and Carrol Stebbins, Ulvinen played no real part in the encouragement, planning or procedure of Hoffman's murder. As such, the court saw to discharge her for the crime of murder by the first degree, instead suggesting that perhaps manslaughter may be more appropriate. However, she was never tried as such.

== Attempted parole and release date ==
Due to the pre-1990 Minnesota law under which Hoffman was sentenced, David Hoffman was required to spend a minimum 17 years of his 30-year sentence without parole. He was eventually allowed to apply for parole in 1994, 3 years earlier than originally sentenced. The attempt however was unsuccessful.

Hoffman again applied for parole in 2000 and was once again rejected due to his evident lack of rehabilitation. In the letter denying parole, then corrections commissioner Sheryl Ramstad Hvass outlined that Hoffman still had no ability to see that his actions were wrong. She further stated that due to his inability to recognize the enormity of the injustice, it would have been very much possible that when released to the outside world a similar crime would be committed.

In both of these original parole enquiries, Hoffman's daughters testified against their mother's side of the family, saying their father should be released from prison.

Hoffman's third attempt at parole came in 2010, after the designated 30 years of imprisonment had been completed. This attempt saw a heavy backlash from Stebbins’ family, insinuating that Hoffman still felt no remorse, and that the family was not ready for him to be released back into society. The parole board agreed, not granting parole and suggesting that another 6 years be served by Hoffman.

In 2016, Hoffman's fourth attempt at parole was met with just as much hostility from Stebbins’ family. However this time, the request for parole was granted. Stebbins’ family reported that they were devastated and scared by the result, and thought that Hoffman's 37 years were not long enough. They were also reported to have said that they were going to continue fighting to keep Hoffman imprisoned even after his release.

Under the details of his release, Hoffman was to spend 6 months at the Willow River/Moose Lake correctional facility in Minnesota. He would spend 6 months in this medium security facility as part of intensive regimen of education in preparation for release.

David Francis Hoffman was released from prison in April 2018. Hoffman was to serve 6 months under intense supervision before being reassessed and potentially allowed unrestricted freedom.

== Stebbins family concern over release ==
Upon Hoffman's conditional release under intensive supervision, there has been some level of concern and outrage from the family of Carol Stebbins. According to reports, the family were extremely apprehensive about the release and were in great fear for their safety. This was to such an extent that Stebbins’ mother, Phyllis Stebbins, contacted police regarding her personal protection and safety, as she believed that when Hoffman was released, he would target her as the figurehead of the movement trying to keep him incarcerated.

The family felt the release is extremely unjust, with father Rodger Stebbins stating that "when he [Hoffman] got sentenced to life, that's what it should mean. Life. No parole. No nothing. He should not have walked a free man." Stebbins' niece, Charity Larsen, has raised similar issues, saying that "it shouldn't even be an issue. He shouldn't have a second chance. She never got a second chance."

In light of their concern, Stebbins' family have continued to attempt further action to ensure that Hoffman is returned to prison. Before his 5th parole hearing in 2016, Carol's niece Jaquelin Stebbins created a petition directed towards the State of Minnesota Department of Corrections Parole Board, stating that the lack of remorse shown by Hoffman at previous parole hearings and in general should be enough to warrant his continued incarceration. The petition gained 578 signatures before the parole meeting but eventually failed as Hoffman was granted his release in April 2018.

The Stebbins family were also not told any details of his release, including where his parole officer resided or his whereabouts of living upon release which, whilst standard procedure, the family still found worrying.
