= Lisa Hardaway =

American aerospace engineer and scientist (1966–2017)

- Engineering career
- Discipline: Aerospace Engineering
- Institutions: Massachusetts Institute of Technology, Stanford University, University of Colorado
- Employer: Ball Aerospace
- Projects: New Horizons

Lisa Hardaway (1966–2017) was an American aerospace engineer and program manager for an instrument on the New Horizons spacecraft to Pluto and Beyond. Among her awards, she was named Engineer of the Year for 2015–2016 by the Colorado American Institute of Aeronautics and Astronautics.

== Life ==
Hardaway graduated from Massachusetts Institute of Technology, Stanford University, and University of Colorado Boulder. She worked for Ball Aerospace. She was program manager for RALPH, on the New Horizons mission. She is survived by her husband, James, and two children.

In the summer of 2017, NASA renamed the LEISA spectrometer on New Horizons to be the Lisa Hardaway Infrared Mapping Spectrometer in her honor.

Lisa made incredible contributions to New Horizons and our success in exploring Pluto, and we wanted to celebrate those contributions in a special way by dedicating the LEISA spectrometer in her honor

— Alan Stern, New Horizons principal investigator

== Awards and honors ==
- Lisa Hardaway was named "Engineer of the Year" for 2015–2016 by Colorado American Institute of Aeronautics and Astronautics.
- Asteroid 161699 Lisahardaway was named in her memory. The official naming citation was published by the Minor Planet Center on 25 September 2018 (M.P.C. 111801).
- A crater on Pluto, Hardaway Crater, was also named in her honor in 2021.
