= Meanings of minor-planet names: 161001–162000 =

As minor planet discoveries are confirmed, they are given a permanent number by the IAU's Minor Planet Center (MPC), and the discoverers can then submit names for them, following the IAU's naming conventions. The list below concerns those minor planets in the specified number-range that have received names, and explains the meanings of those names.

Official naming citations of newly named small Solar System bodies are approved and published in a bulletin by IAU's Working Group for Small Bodies Nomenclature (WGSBN). Before May 2021, citations were published in MPC's Minor Planet Circulars for many decades. Recent citations can also be found on the JPL Small-Body Database (SBDB). Until his death in 2016, German astronomer Lutz D. Schmadel compiled these citations into the Dictionary of Minor Planet Names (DMP) and regularly updated the collection.

Based on Paul Herget's The Names of the Minor Planets, Schmadel also researched the unclear origin of numerous asteroids, most of which had been named prior to World War II. This article incorporates text from this source, which is in the public domain: SBDB New namings may only be added to this list below after official publication as the preannouncement of names is condemned. The WGSBN publishes a comprehensive guideline for the naming rules of non-cometary small Solar System bodies.

== 161001–161100 ==
Named minor planet	Provisional	This minor planet was named for...	Ref · Catalog
161092 Zsigmond	2002 OL_{28}	Vilmos Zsigmond (1930–2016), Academy Award-winning Hungarian-American cinematographer	JPL · 161092

== 161101–161200 ==
back to top

Named minor planet	Provisional	This minor planet was named for...	Ref · Catalog
There are no named minor planets in this number range

== 161201–161300 ==
back to top

Named minor planet	Provisional	This minor planet was named for...	Ref · Catalog
161207 Lidz	2002 TW_{305}	Adam Lidz (born 1973), American astronomer with the Sloan Digital Sky Survey	JPL · 161207
161215 Loveday	2002 UL_{66}	Jonathan Loveday (born 1963), British astronomer with the Sloan Digital Sky Survey	JPL · 161215
161230 Martinbacháček	2002 XO_{90}	Martin Bacháček z Nauměřic (c. 1539–1612) was a Czech mathematician and astronomer, rector of Charles University in Prague, and a friend, collaborator and supporter of Johannes Kepler.	IAU · 161230
161278 Cesarmendoza	2003 FW_{128}	Cesar Mendoza (1962–2008), Venezuelan astrophysicist	JPL · 161278

== 161301–161400 ==
back to top

Named minor planet	Provisional	This minor planet was named for...	Ref · Catalog
161315 de Shalit	2003 QS_{5}	Amos de-Shalit (1926–1969), an Israeli nuclear physicist	JPL · 161315
161349 Mecsek	2003 SJ_{127}	Mecsek is a mountain range in southern Hungary	JPL · 161349
161371 Bertrandou	2003 SO_{244}	Bertrand Christophe (born 1976), son of French discoverer Bernard Christophe, named for Bertrandou le Fifre, a character in Edmond Rostand's play Cyrano de Bergerac	JPL · 161371

== 161401–161500 ==
back to top

Named minor planet	Provisional	This minor planet was named for...	Ref · Catalog
There are no named minor planets in this number range

== 161501–161600 ==
back to top

Named minor planet	Provisional	This minor planet was named for...	Ref · Catalog
161545 Ferrando	2004 XP_{16}	Rafael Ferrando (born 1966), Spanish astronomer, discoverer of minor planets and founder of the Pla D'Arguines Astronomical Observatory (Spanish: Observatorio Astronomico Pla D'Arguines) in Valencia	JPL · 161545
161546 Schneeweis	2004 XT_{16}	LtCdr (USN) Scott Schneeweis, American early U.S. space program historian, webmaster of †	JPL · 161546
161585 Danielhals	2005 GN_{184}	Daniel W. Hals (born 1983) is a software engineer at the Johns Hopkins University Applied Physics Laboratory, who served as the Ground Systems Software Lead for the New Horizons Mission to Pluto.	JPL · 161585
161592 Sarahhamilton	2005 PN_{24}	Sarah A. Hamilton (born 1974) is an operations manager at the Johns Hopkins University Applied Physics Laboratory. She served as the Mission Operations Planning Lead Manager for the New Horizons Mission to Pluto.	JPL · 161592

== 161601–161700 ==
back to top

Named minor planet	Provisional	This minor planet was named for...	Ref · Catalog
161625 Susskind	2005 YJ_{7}	Leonard Susskind (born 1940), American theoretical physicist and Professor of theoretical physics at Stanford University.	JPL · 161625
161661 Bobbyclarke	2006 CN_{59}	Robert Earle "Bobby" Clarke (born 1949), Canadian-born hockey player.	JPL · 161661
161693 Attilladanko	2006 HL_{46}	Attilla Danko (1955–2024), Canadian software designer and amateur astronomer	JPL · 161693
161699 Lisahardaway	2006 HR_{140}	Lisa Hardaway (1966–2017) was a program manager for Ball Aerospace, who managed the Ralph spectral imaging instrument for the New Horizons Mission to Pluto.	JPL · 161699

== 161701–161800 ==
back to top

Named minor planet	Provisional	This minor planet was named for...	Ref · Catalog
161715 Wenchuan	2006 MZ_{12}	The memory of the 90,000 people who lost their lives in the 2008 Sichuan earthquake (or "Wenchuan earthquake") in China	JPL · 161715
161750 Garyladd	2006 SQ_{285}	Gary Ladd (born 1947) is a photographer and author. He has spent over 40 years shooting iconic images of national parks in and around the Colorado Plateau. Ladd has a deep appreciation for geology and nature that is captured in his stunning photographs.	IAU · 161750

== 161801–161900 ==
back to top

Named minor planet	Provisional	This minor planet was named for...	Ref · Catalog
161835 Barbmcclintock	2006 XY_{50}	Barbara McClintock (1902–1992) was an American scientist and cytogeneticist. She was awarded the 1983 Nobel Prize in Physiology or Medicine for the discovery of genetic transposition. McClintock was the third woman elected to the National Academy of Sciences, and the first elected president of the Genetics Society of America.	IAU · 161835

== 161901–162000 ==
back to top

Named minor planet	Provisional	This minor planet was named for...	Ref · Catalog
161913 Hunyadi	2007 EA	The Hunyadi family was a Hungarian noble family, whose members played a decisive role in the history of the medieval Kingdom of Hungary. János Hunyadi was governor of Hungary and Viceroy of Transylvania, while King Matthias Corvinus made Hungary a significant Renaissance power by European standards.	IAU · 161913
161962 Galchyn	2007 HE_{84}	The small village of Galchyn, location of the Andrushivka Astronomical Observatory in Andrushivka, northern Ukraine	JPL · 161962
161975 Kincsem	2007 LO	Kincsem was the most successful Thoroughbred race horse ever, having won 54 races for 54 starts	JPL · 161975
161989 Cacus	1978 CA	Cacus, from Roman mythology, a fire-breathing son of the fire good Vulcan. Cacus was killed by Jupiter's son, Hercules.	JPL · 161989

back to top

Preceded by 160,001–161,000	Meanings of minor-planet names List of minor planets: 161,001–162,000	Succeeded by 162,001–163,000
