= List of minor planets: 161001–162000 =

The following is a partial list of minor planets, running from minor-planet number 161001 through 162000, inclusive. The primary data for this and other partial lists is based on JPL's "Small-Body Orbital Elements" and data available from the Minor Planet Center. Critical list information is also provided by the MPC, unless otherwise specified from Lowell Observatory. A detailed description of the table's columns and additional sources are given on the main page including a complete list of every page in this series, and a statistical break-up on the dynamical classification of minor planets.

Also see the summary list of all named bodies in numerical and alphabetical order, and the corresponding naming citations for the number range of this particular list. New namings may only be added to this list after official publication, as the preannouncement of names is condemned by the Working Group for Small Bodies Nomenclature of the International Astronomical Union.

Near-Earth obj.	MBA (inner)	MBA (outer)	Centaur
Mars-crosser	MBA (middle)	Jupiter trojan	Trans-Neptunian obj.
Unclassified

== 161001–161100 ==
Designation			Discovery			Properties		Ref
Permanent	Provisional	Named after	Date	Site	Discoverer(s)	Category	Diam.	Ref
161001	2002 CG_{310}	—	February 6, 2002	Palomar	NEAT	·	1.6 km	MPC · JPL
161002	2002 CQ_{314}	—	February 11, 2002	Socorro	LINEAR	V	1.2 km	MPC · JPL
161003	2002 DA_{2}	—	February 19, 2002	Socorro	LINEAR	L4	20 km	MPC · JPL
161004	2002 DV_{3}	—	February 19, 2002	Socorro	LINEAR	H	1.1 km	MPC · JPL
161005	2002 DV_{19}	—	February 16, 2002	Palomar	NEAT	·	2.0 km	MPC · JPL
161006	2002 EV_{2}	—	March 10, 2002	Fountain Hills	C. W. Juels, P. R. Holvorcem	NYS	2.2 km	MPC · JPL
161007	2002 EL_{32}	—	March 10, 2002	Haleakala	NEAT	MAS	910 m	MPC · JPL
161008	2002 EO_{40}	—	March 9, 2002	Socorro	LINEAR	NYS	2.0 km	MPC · JPL
161009	2002 EP_{41}	—	March 12, 2002	Socorro	LINEAR	·	1.5 km	MPC · JPL
161010	2002 EK_{46}	—	March 11, 2002	Palomar	NEAT	·	2.2 km	MPC · JPL
161011	2002 EU_{47}	—	March 12, 2002	Palomar	NEAT	·	2.7 km	MPC · JPL
161012	2002 EK_{65}	—	March 13, 2002	Socorro	LINEAR	·	1.9 km	MPC · JPL
161013	2002 EF_{74}	—	March 13, 2002	Socorro	LINEAR	·	2.2 km	MPC · JPL
161014	2002 ES_{80}	—	March 13, 2002	Palomar	NEAT	·	1.6 km	MPC · JPL
161015	2002 EY_{86}	—	March 9, 2002	Socorro	LINEAR	NYS	2.4 km	MPC · JPL
161016	2002 EG_{92}	—	March 13, 2002	Socorro	LINEAR	·	3.8 km	MPC · JPL
161017	2002 EP_{106}	—	March 9, 2002	Anderson Mesa	LONEOS	L4	14 km	MPC · JPL
161018	2002 EU_{107}	—	March 10, 2002	Haleakala	NEAT	L4	19 km	MPC · JPL
161019	2002 EM_{115}	—	March 10, 2002	Haleakala	NEAT	·	2.2 km	MPC · JPL
161020	2002 EK_{158}	—	March 5, 2002	Apache Point	SDSS	L4	10 km	MPC · JPL
161021	2002 EC_{161}	—	March 10, 2002	Bohyunsan	Bohyunsan	·	1.5 km	MPC · JPL
161022	2002 EP_{161}	—	March 14, 2002	Palomar	NEAT	PHO	4.0 km	MPC · JPL
161023	2002 FL_{2}	—	March 19, 2002	Desert Eagle	W. K. Y. Yeung	·	2.3 km	MPC · JPL
161024	2002 FM_{7}	—	March 23, 2002	Uccle	T. Pauwels	L4	20 km	MPC · JPL
161025	2002 FP_{11}	—	March 16, 2002	Socorro	LINEAR	·	2.4 km	MPC · JPL
161026	2002 FP_{32}	—	March 21, 2002	Palomar	NEAT	(2076)	1.6 km	MPC · JPL
161027	2002 FM_{38}	—	March 30, 2002	Palomar	NEAT	L4	10 km	MPC · JPL
161028	2002 GS_{7}	—	April 14, 2002	Desert Eagle	W. K. Y. Yeung	EOS	3.2 km	MPC · JPL
161029	2002 GJ_{42}	—	April 4, 2002	Palomar	NEAT	V	1.3 km	MPC · JPL
161030	2002 GR_{62}	—	April 8, 2002	Palomar	NEAT	KOR	2.4 km	MPC · JPL
161031	2002 GA_{65}	—	April 8, 2002	Palomar	NEAT	MIS	2.8 km	MPC · JPL
161032	2002 GP_{65}	—	April 8, 2002	Palomar	NEAT	·	2.8 km	MPC · JPL
161033	2002 GW_{84}	—	April 10, 2002	Socorro	LINEAR	·	2.4 km	MPC · JPL
161034	2002 GT_{93}	—	April 9, 2002	Socorro	LINEAR	·	2.7 km	MPC · JPL
161035	2002 GH_{95}	—	April 9, 2002	Socorro	LINEAR	·	5.8 km	MPC · JPL
161036	2002 GL_{101}	—	April 10, 2002	Socorro	LINEAR	·	2.0 km	MPC · JPL
161037	2002 GV_{104}	—	April 10, 2002	Socorro	LINEAR	·	2.8 km	MPC · JPL
161038	2002 GJ_{109}	—	April 11, 2002	Anderson Mesa	LONEOS	H	770 m	MPC · JPL
161039	2002 GY_{126}	—	April 12, 2002	Palomar	NEAT	JUN	1.6 km	MPC · JPL
161040	2002 GQ_{155}	—	April 13, 2002	Palomar	NEAT	EMA	5.4 km	MPC · JPL
161041	2002 GQ_{159}	—	April 14, 2002	Socorro	LINEAR	·	2.8 km	MPC · JPL
161042	2002 GO_{162}	—	April 14, 2002	Palomar	NEAT	·	2.4 km	MPC · JPL
161043	2002 GL_{170}	—	April 9, 2002	Socorro	LINEAR	·	2.4 km	MPC · JPL
161044	2002 GG_{181}	—	April 8, 2002	Palomar	NEAT	L4	14 km	MPC · JPL
161045	2002 GB_{182}	—	April 14, 2002	Socorro	LINEAR	·	2.1 km	MPC · JPL
161046	2002 HP_{3}	—	April 16, 2002	Socorro	LINEAR	·	2.4 km	MPC · JPL
161047	2002 JK_{1}	—	May 3, 2002	Kitt Peak	Spacewatch	·	5.2 km	MPC · JPL
161048	2002 JA_{6}	—	May 5, 2002	Palomar	NEAT	·	2.5 km	MPC · JPL
161049	2002 JV_{12}	—	May 8, 2002	Desert Eagle	W. K. Y. Yeung	EUN	2.0 km	MPC · JPL
161050	2002 JE_{15}	—	May 8, 2002	Socorro	LINEAR	·	4.0 km	MPC · JPL
161051	2002 JW_{24}	—	May 8, 2002	Socorro	LINEAR	EUN	2.0 km	MPC · JPL
161052	2002 JA_{29}	—	May 9, 2002	Socorro	LINEAR	MAR	2.0 km	MPC · JPL
161053	2002 JO_{32}	—	May 9, 2002	Socorro	LINEAR	·	2.8 km	MPC · JPL
161054	2002 JD_{44}	—	May 9, 2002	Socorro	LINEAR	·	3.0 km	MPC · JPL
161055	2002 JV_{46}	—	May 9, 2002	Socorro	LINEAR	·	3.1 km	MPC · JPL
161056	2002 JG_{53}	—	May 9, 2002	Socorro	LINEAR	·	3.4 km	MPC · JPL
161057	2002 JL_{74}	—	May 9, 2002	Socorro	LINEAR	RAF	2.7 km	MPC · JPL
161058	2002 JK_{78}	—	May 11, 2002	Socorro	LINEAR	·	3.5 km	MPC · JPL
161059	2002 JE_{83}	—	May 11, 2002	Socorro	LINEAR	(5)	1.9 km	MPC · JPL
161060	2002 JZ_{85}	—	May 11, 2002	Socorro	LINEAR	·	2.8 km	MPC · JPL
161061	2002 JN_{99}	—	May 13, 2002	Palomar	NEAT	EUN	2.2 km	MPC · JPL
161062	2002 JY_{102}	—	May 9, 2002	Socorro	LINEAR	·	4.0 km	MPC · JPL
161063	2002 JJ_{106}	—	May 15, 2002	Socorro	LINEAR	·	2.9 km	MPC · JPL
161064	2002 JJ_{107}	—	May 11, 2002	Palomar	NEAT	EUN	2.1 km	MPC · JPL
161065	2002 JR_{143}	—	May 13, 2002	Palomar	NEAT	EUN	2.0 km	MPC · JPL
161066	2002 KB_{2}	—	May 16, 2002	Socorro	LINEAR	·	2.7 km	MPC · JPL
161067	2002 KE_{9}	—	May 29, 2002	Haleakala	NEAT	·	4.2 km	MPC · JPL
161068	2002 KY_{11}	—	May 17, 2002	Palomar	NEAT	·	2.3 km	MPC · JPL
161069	2002 LG_{8}	—	June 5, 2002	Socorro	LINEAR	·	2.8 km	MPC · JPL
161070	2002 LU_{14}	—	June 6, 2002	Socorro	LINEAR	·	1.2 km	MPC · JPL
161071	2002 LC_{25}	—	June 2, 2002	Palomar	NEAT	·	2.5 km	MPC · JPL
161072	2002 LQ_{28}	—	June 9, 2002	Socorro	LINEAR	·	3.9 km	MPC · JPL
161073	2002 LH_{35}	—	June 12, 2002	Fountain Hills	C. W. Juels, P. R. Holvorcem	·	2.9 km	MPC · JPL
161074	2002 LR_{37}	—	June 12, 2002	Socorro	LINEAR	·	3.9 km	MPC · JPL
161075	2002 LR_{38}	—	June 6, 2002	Kitt Peak	Spacewatch	·	3.0 km	MPC · JPL
161076	2002 LY_{40}	—	June 10, 2002	Socorro	LINEAR	·	3.9 km	MPC · JPL
161077	2002 LB_{43}	—	June 10, 2002	Socorro	LINEAR	·	3.7 km	MPC · JPL
161078	2002 LE_{57}	—	June 10, 2002	Palomar	NEAT	·	8.2 km	MPC · JPL
161079	2002 LP_{61}	—	June 14, 2002	Palomar	NEAT	·	4.6 km	MPC · JPL
161080	2002 MC_{1}	—	June 19, 2002	Campo Imperatore	CINEOS	·	11 km	MPC · JPL
161081	2002 NR_{2}	—	July 5, 2002	Socorro	LINEAR	·	2.2 km	MPC · JPL
161082	2002 NS_{8}	—	July 1, 2002	Palomar	NEAT	·	4.1 km	MPC · JPL
161083	2002 NU_{23}	—	July 9, 2002	Socorro	LINEAR	BRA	2.2 km	MPC · JPL
161084	2002 NM_{64}	—	July 2, 2002	Palomar	NEAT	NYS	1.2 km	MPC · JPL
161085	2002 OR_{3}	—	July 17, 2002	Socorro	LINEAR	·	8.2 km	MPC · JPL
161086	2002 OZ_{3}	—	July 17, 2002	Socorro	LINEAR	·	8.4 km	MPC · JPL
161087	2002 OS_{8}	—	July 19, 2002	Palomar	NEAT	·	3.9 km	MPC · JPL
161088	2002 OJ_{10}	—	July 21, 2002	Palomar	NEAT	EOS	4.1 km	MPC · JPL
161089	2002 OY_{10}	—	July 22, 2002	Palomar	NEAT	·	1.8 km	MPC · JPL
161090	2002 ON_{13}	—	July 18, 2002	Socorro	LINEAR	·	5.3 km	MPC · JPL
161091	2002 OR_{14}	—	July 18, 2002	Socorro	LINEAR	·	2.0 km	MPC · JPL
161092 Zsigmond	2002 OL_{28}	Zsigmond	July 29, 2002	Palomar	K. Sárneczky	·	3.7 km	MPC · JPL
161093	2002 PH_{44}	—	August 5, 2002	Socorro	LINEAR	·	1.4 km	MPC · JPL
161094	2002 PS_{45}	—	August 9, 2002	Socorro	LINEAR	EUP	7.4 km	MPC · JPL
161095	2002 PL_{56}	—	August 9, 2002	Socorro	LINEAR	·	6.7 km	MPC · JPL
161096	2002 PP_{92}	—	August 14, 2002	Socorro	LINEAR	EMA · slow	7.1 km	MPC · JPL
161097	2002 PP_{111}	—	August 14, 2002	Socorro	LINEAR	·	4.5 km	MPC · JPL
161098	2002 PS_{118}	—	August 13, 2002	Anderson Mesa	LONEOS	V	1.1 km	MPC · JPL
161099	2002 PN_{124}	—	August 13, 2002	Anderson Mesa	LONEOS	·	1.6 km	MPC · JPL
161100	2002 PQ_{124}	—	August 13, 2002	Anderson Mesa	LONEOS	·	1.1 km	MPC · JPL

== 161101–161200 ==
back to top

Designation			Discovery			Properties		Ref
Permanent	Provisional	Named after	Date	Site	Discoverer(s)	Category	Diam.	Ref
161101	2002 PL_{154}	—	August 9, 2002	Socorro	LINEAR	slow	4.5 km	MPC · JPL
161102	2002 PU_{165}	—	August 8, 2002	Palomar	Lowe, A.	·	2.4 km	MPC · JPL
161103	2002 PT_{169}	—	August 8, 2002	Palomar	NEAT	·	860 m	MPC · JPL
161104	2002 PF_{174}	—	August 8, 2002	Palomar	NEAT	·	5.7 km	MPC · JPL
161105	2002 QS_{7}	—	August 16, 2002	Palomar	NEAT	EOS	3.9 km	MPC · JPL
161106	2002 QK_{14}	—	August 26, 2002	Palomar	NEAT	TEL	2.5 km	MPC · JPL
161107	2002 QR_{16}	—	August 27, 2002	Palomar	NEAT	·	3.3 km	MPC · JPL
161108	2002 QT_{27}	—	August 28, 2002	Palomar	NEAT	·	3.5 km	MPC · JPL
161109	2002 QA_{46}	—	August 29, 2002	Palomar	NEAT	·	4.1 km	MPC · JPL
161110	2002 QA_{54}	—	August 29, 2002	Palomar	S. F. Hönig	EOS	2.6 km	MPC · JPL
161111	2002 QS_{56}	—	August 29, 2002	Palomar	S. F. Hönig	KOR	2.4 km	MPC · JPL
161112	2002 QX_{57}	—	August 29, 2002	Palomar	S. F. Hönig	·	3.9 km	MPC · JPL
161113	2002 QX_{98}	—	August 26, 2002	Palomar	NEAT	·	4.9 km	MPC · JPL
161114	2002 RC_{2}	—	September 4, 2002	Anderson Mesa	LONEOS	·	1.8 km	MPC · JPL
161115	2002 RL_{2}	—	September 4, 2002	Anderson Mesa	LONEOS	·	4.9 km	MPC · JPL
161116	2002 RL_{5}	—	September 3, 2002	Palomar	NEAT	·	7.9 km	MPC · JPL
161117	2002 RO_{13}	—	September 4, 2002	Anderson Mesa	LONEOS	THM	5.0 km	MPC · JPL
161118	2002 RB_{17}	—	September 4, 2002	Anderson Mesa	LONEOS	EOS	3.4 km	MPC · JPL
161119	2002 RK_{17}	—	September 4, 2002	Anderson Mesa	LONEOS	·	6.8 km	MPC · JPL
161120	2002 RH_{18}	—	September 4, 2002	Anderson Mesa	LONEOS	·	7.6 km	MPC · JPL
161121	2002 RZ_{18}	—	September 4, 2002	Anderson Mesa	LONEOS	·	2.4 km	MPC · JPL
161122	2002 RH_{21}	—	September 4, 2002	Anderson Mesa	LONEOS	·	7.1 km	MPC · JPL
161123	2002 RA_{37}	—	September 5, 2002	Anderson Mesa	LONEOS	·	3.3 km	MPC · JPL
161124	2002 RH_{44}	—	September 5, 2002	Socorro	LINEAR	·	4.3 km	MPC · JPL
161125	2002 RY_{58}	—	September 5, 2002	Anderson Mesa	LONEOS	·	7.1 km	MPC · JPL
161126	2002 RH_{61}	—	September 5, 2002	Socorro	LINEAR	·	8.2 km	MPC · JPL
161127	2002 RW_{68}	—	September 4, 2002	Anderson Mesa	LONEOS	EOS	3.0 km	MPC · JPL
161128	2002 RG_{77}	—	September 5, 2002	Socorro	LINEAR	·	4.1 km	MPC · JPL
161129	2002 RG_{80}	—	September 5, 2002	Socorro	LINEAR	KOR	2.8 km	MPC · JPL
161130	2002 RL_{82}	—	September 5, 2002	Socorro	LINEAR	·	7.5 km	MPC · JPL
161131	2002 RR_{87}	—	September 5, 2002	Socorro	LINEAR	·	1.6 km	MPC · JPL
161132	2002 RK_{96}	—	September 5, 2002	Socorro	LINEAR	·	4.5 km	MPC · JPL
161133	2002 RR_{108}	—	September 5, 2002	Haleakala	NEAT	·	3.5 km	MPC · JPL
161134	2002 RJ_{111}	—	September 6, 2002	Socorro	LINEAR	·	5.5 km	MPC · JPL
161135	2002 RB_{116}	—	September 6, 2002	Socorro	LINEAR	NYS	1.8 km	MPC · JPL
161136	2002 RT_{117}	—	September 1, 2002	Kvistaberg	Uppsala-DLR Asteroid Survey	·	4.5 km	MPC · JPL
161137	2002 RN_{136}	—	September 11, 2002	Haleakala	NEAT	EOS	3.4 km	MPC · JPL
161138	2002 RD_{138}	—	September 13, 2002	Socorro	LINEAR	·	6.6 km	MPC · JPL
161139	2002 RJ_{150}	—	September 11, 2002	Haleakala	NEAT	EOS	3.6 km	MPC · JPL
161140	2002 RA_{152}	—	September 12, 2002	Palomar	NEAT	·	4.0 km	MPC · JPL
161141	2002 RD_{152}	—	September 12, 2002	Palomar	NEAT	·	2.6 km	MPC · JPL
161142	2002 RG_{152}	—	September 12, 2002	Palomar	NEAT	·	4.9 km	MPC · JPL
161143	2002 RR_{161}	—	September 12, 2002	Palomar	NEAT	·	3.0 km	MPC · JPL
161144	2002 RL_{202}	—	September 13, 2002	Palomar	NEAT	EOS	4.7 km	MPC · JPL
161145	2002 RA_{204}	—	September 14, 2002	Palomar	NEAT	EOS	2.7 km	MPC · JPL
161146	2002 RH_{245}	—	September 15, 2002	Palomar	NEAT	KOR	2.4 km	MPC · JPL
161147	2002 RW_{254}	—	September 14, 2002	Palomar	NEAT	·	3.1 km	MPC · JPL
161148	2002 SN_{15}	—	September 27, 2002	Palomar	NEAT	·	7.8 km	MPC · JPL
161149	2002 SA_{20}	—	September 26, 2002	Palomar	NEAT	·	2.4 km	MPC · JPL
161150	2002 SL_{25}	—	September 28, 2002	Haleakala	NEAT	·	820 m	MPC · JPL
161151	2002 SH_{27}	—	September 29, 2002	Haleakala	NEAT	VER ·	6.5 km	MPC · JPL
161152	2002 SR_{28}	—	September 27, 2002	Socorro	LINEAR	H	1.3 km	MPC · JPL
161153	2002 SF_{30}	—	September 28, 2002	Haleakala	NEAT	·	5.4 km	MPC · JPL
161154	2002 SV_{36}	—	September 29, 2002	Kitt Peak	Spacewatch	·	3.9 km	MPC · JPL
161155	2002 SY_{36}	—	September 29, 2002	Haleakala	NEAT	NYS	1.9 km	MPC · JPL
161156	2002 SZ_{37}	—	September 30, 2002	Drebach	Drebach	·	4.2 km	MPC · JPL
161157	2002 SJ_{39}	—	September 30, 2002	Socorro	LINEAR	·	4.9 km	MPC · JPL
161158	2002 ST_{52}	—	September 18, 2002	Palomar	NEAT	·	7.7 km	MPC · JPL
161159	2002 SH_{57}	—	September 30, 2002	Haleakala	NEAT	·	2.3 km	MPC · JPL
161160	2002 SZ_{66}	—	September 30, 2002	Haleakala	NEAT	·	5.1 km	MPC · JPL
161161	2002 TX	—	October 1, 2002	Anderson Mesa	LONEOS	·	5.1 km	MPC · JPL
161162	2002 TH_{1}	—	October 1, 2002	Anderson Mesa	LONEOS	HYG	4.9 km	MPC · JPL
161163	2002 TZ_{1}	—	October 1, 2002	Anderson Mesa	LONEOS	·	2.0 km	MPC · JPL
161164	2002 TE_{9}	—	October 1, 2002	Anderson Mesa	LONEOS	THM	3.6 km	MPC · JPL
161165	2002 TH_{17}	—	October 2, 2002	Socorro	LINEAR	·	4.2 km	MPC · JPL
161166	2002 TD_{24}	—	October 2, 2002	Socorro	LINEAR	·	4.1 km	MPC · JPL
161167	2002 TP_{26}	—	October 2, 2002	Socorro	LINEAR	·	4.2 km	MPC · JPL
161168	2002 TQ_{33}	—	October 2, 2002	Socorro	LINEAR	·	1.8 km	MPC · JPL
161169	2002 TY_{38}	—	October 2, 2002	Socorro	LINEAR	TIR	5.6 km	MPC · JPL
161170	2002 TX_{47}	—	October 2, 2002	Socorro	LINEAR	·	1.8 km	MPC · JPL
161171	2002 TY_{52}	—	October 2, 2002	Socorro	LINEAR	·	7.7 km	MPC · JPL
161172	2002 TH_{55}	—	October 2, 2002	Haleakala	NEAT	TIR	5.8 km	MPC · JPL
161173	2002 TW_{62}	—	October 3, 2002	Campo Imperatore	CINEOS	HYG	6.6 km	MPC · JPL
161174	2002 TD_{68}	—	October 7, 2002	Socorro	LINEAR	H	1.1 km	MPC · JPL
161175	2002 TX_{70}	—	October 3, 2002	Palomar	NEAT	EOS	4.1 km	MPC · JPL
161176	2002 TT_{75}	—	October 1, 2002	Anderson Mesa	LONEOS	·	4.5 km	MPC · JPL
161177	2002 TS_{89}	—	October 3, 2002	Palomar	NEAT	·	6.5 km	MPC · JPL
161178	2002 TM_{99}	—	October 4, 2002	Palomar	NEAT	·	4.9 km	MPC · JPL
161179	2002 TQ_{100}	—	October 4, 2002	Socorro	LINEAR	·	6.0 km	MPC · JPL
161180	2002 TO_{105}	—	October 4, 2002	Anderson Mesa	LONEOS	·	3.9 km	MPC · JPL
161181	2002 TH_{110}	—	October 2, 2002	Haleakala	NEAT	·	6.9 km	MPC · JPL
161182	2002 TO_{120}	—	October 3, 2002	Palomar	NEAT	EOS	3.4 km	MPC · JPL
161183	2002 TV_{122}	—	October 4, 2002	Palomar	NEAT	·	6.5 km	MPC · JPL
161184	2002 TL_{126}	—	October 4, 2002	Socorro	LINEAR	·	5.8 km	MPC · JPL
161185	2002 TZ_{127}	—	October 4, 2002	Palomar	NEAT	EOS	3.7 km	MPC · JPL
161186	2002 TW_{135}	—	October 4, 2002	Anderson Mesa	LONEOS	EOS	4.1 km	MPC · JPL
161187	2002 TD_{139}	—	October 4, 2002	Anderson Mesa	LONEOS	·	5.1 km	MPC · JPL
161188	2002 TA_{157}	—	October 5, 2002	Palomar	NEAT	·	7.7 km	MPC · JPL
161189	2002 TU_{179}	—	October 13, 2002	Palomar	NEAT	·	2.3 km	MPC · JPL
161190	2002 TW_{180}	—	October 14, 2002	Socorro	LINEAR	·	6.8 km	MPC · JPL
161191	2002 TZ_{183}	—	October 4, 2002	Socorro	LINEAR	·	4.6 km	MPC · JPL
161192	2002 TN_{196}	—	October 4, 2002	Campo Imperatore	CINEOS	NYS	1.5 km	MPC · JPL
161193	2002 TG_{199}	—	October 6, 2002	Socorro	LINEAR	EUN	2.3 km	MPC · JPL
161194	2002 TS_{206}	—	October 4, 2002	Socorro	LINEAR	·	2.7 km	MPC · JPL
161195	2002 TS_{227}	—	October 8, 2002	Anderson Mesa	LONEOS	·	5.0 km	MPC · JPL
161196	2002 TN_{229}	—	October 9, 2002	Socorro	LINEAR	·	4.9 km	MPC · JPL
161197	2002 TU_{231}	—	October 8, 2002	Palomar	NEAT	EUP	7.5 km	MPC · JPL
161198	2002 TB_{237}	—	October 6, 2002	Socorro	LINEAR	ADE	4.5 km	MPC · JPL
161199	2002 TA_{245}	—	October 7, 2002	Haleakala	NEAT	·	4.9 km	MPC · JPL
161200	2002 TO_{254}	—	October 9, 2002	Anderson Mesa	LONEOS	·	4.9 km	MPC · JPL

== 161201–161300 ==
back to top

Designation			Discovery			Properties		Ref
Permanent	Provisional	Named after	Date	Site	Discoverer(s)	Category	Diam.	Ref
161201	2002 TT_{254}	—	October 9, 2002	Anderson Mesa	LONEOS	·	7.7 km	MPC · JPL
161202	2002 TN_{257}	—	October 9, 2002	Socorro	LINEAR	NYS	1.6 km	MPC · JPL
161203	2002 TT_{269}	—	October 9, 2002	Socorro	LINEAR	·	5.5 km	MPC · JPL
161204	2002 TK_{270}	—	October 9, 2002	Socorro	LINEAR	·	5.6 km	MPC · JPL
161205	2002 TA_{271}	—	October 9, 2002	Socorro	LINEAR	·	5.5 km	MPC · JPL
161206	2002 TG_{292}	—	October 10, 2002	Socorro	LINEAR	·	2.1 km	MPC · JPL
161207 Lidz	2002 TW_{305}	Lidz	October 4, 2002	Apache Point	SDSS	·	4.8 km	MPC · JPL
161208	2002 UQ_{5}	—	October 28, 2002	Palomar	NEAT	·	5.4 km	MPC · JPL
161209	2002 UW_{5}	—	October 28, 2002	Socorro	LINEAR	·	6.4 km	MPC · JPL
161210	2002 UG_{6}	—	October 28, 2002	Palomar	NEAT	·	2.6 km	MPC · JPL
161211	2002 UA_{7}	—	October 28, 2002	Palomar	NEAT	·	7.1 km	MPC · JPL
161212	2002 UE_{19}	—	October 30, 2002	Haleakala	NEAT	·	3.9 km	MPC · JPL
161213	2002 UK_{31}	—	October 30, 2002	Haleakala	NEAT	VER	5.1 km	MPC · JPL
161214	2002 UU_{47}	—	October 31, 2002	Anderson Mesa	LONEOS	THM	4.6 km	MPC · JPL
161215 Loveday	2002 UL_{66}	Loveday	October 30, 2002	Apache Point	SDSS	·	2.3 km	MPC · JPL
161216	2002 VR_{6}	—	November 1, 2002	Palomar	NEAT	HYG	5.3 km	MPC · JPL
161217	2002 VS_{54}	—	November 6, 2002	Socorro	LINEAR	THM	4.4 km	MPC · JPL
161218	2002 VD_{85}	—	November 10, 2002	Socorro	LINEAR	·	7.7 km	MPC · JPL
161219	2002 VW_{138}	—	November 14, 2002	Palomar	NEAT	·	1.6 km	MPC · JPL
161220	2002 WH_{17}	—	November 29, 2002	Eskridge	Farpoint	·	5.0 km	MPC · JPL
161221	2002 XJ_{1}	—	December 1, 2002	Socorro	LINEAR	slow	5.8 km	MPC · JPL
161222	2002 XO_{5}	—	December 1, 2002	Socorro	LINEAR	·	4.1 km	MPC · JPL
161223	2002 XG_{20}	—	December 2, 2002	Socorro	LINEAR	·	1.6 km	MPC · JPL
161224	2002 XP_{44}	—	December 7, 2002	Socorro	LINEAR	·	5.0 km	MPC · JPL
161225	2002 XN_{56}	—	December 10, 2002	Socorro	LINEAR	·	9.4 km	MPC · JPL
161226	2002 XC_{63}	—	December 11, 2002	Socorro	LINEAR	(5)	2.2 km	MPC · JPL
161227	2002 XO_{68}	—	December 12, 2002	Haleakala	NEAT	·	4.6 km	MPC · JPL
161228	2002 XF_{70}	—	December 10, 2002	Palomar	NEAT	·	5.0 km	MPC · JPL
161229	2002 XK_{71}	—	December 10, 2002	Socorro	LINEAR	V	1.2 km	MPC · JPL
161230 Martinbacháček	2002 XO_{90}	Martinbacháček	December 13, 2002	Kleť	KLENOT	·	2.4 km	MPC · JPL
161231	2002 XD_{108}	—	December 6, 2002	Socorro	LINEAR	·	2.9 km	MPC · JPL
161232	2002 YG_{18}	—	December 31, 2002	Socorro	LINEAR	·	1.1 km	MPC · JPL
161233	2003 AS_{2}	—	January 2, 2003	Socorro	LINEAR	H	1.3 km	MPC · JPL
161234	2003 AB_{9}	—	January 3, 2003	Socorro	LINEAR	H	1 km	MPC · JPL
161235	2003 AV_{14}	—	January 2, 2003	Socorro	LINEAR	·	3.5 km	MPC · JPL
161236	2003 AK_{29}	—	January 4, 2003	Socorro	LINEAR	·	1.9 km	MPC · JPL
161237	2003 AT_{36}	—	January 7, 2003	Socorro	LINEAR	fast	1.2 km	MPC · JPL
161238	2003 AC_{65}	—	January 7, 2003	Socorro	LINEAR	·	4.3 km	MPC · JPL
161239	2003 AP_{69}	—	January 8, 2003	Socorro	LINEAR	·	2.4 km	MPC · JPL
161240	2003 BK_{9}	—	January 26, 2003	Palomar	NEAT	EOS	3.7 km	MPC · JPL
161241	2003 BE_{12}	—	January 26, 2003	Anderson Mesa	LONEOS	NYS	1.6 km	MPC · JPL
161242	2003 BK_{13}	—	January 26, 2003	Palomar	NEAT	·	2.5 km	MPC · JPL
161243	2003 BX_{16}	—	January 26, 2003	Haleakala	NEAT	·	2.0 km	MPC · JPL
161244	2003 BP_{31}	—	January 27, 2003	Socorro	LINEAR	·	1.7 km	MPC · JPL
161245	2003 BH_{74}	—	January 29, 2003	Palomar	NEAT	·	3.4 km	MPC · JPL
161246	2003 BJ_{78}	—	January 31, 2003	Socorro	LINEAR	·	8.0 km	MPC · JPL
161247	2003 BM_{84}	—	January 30, 2003	Anderson Mesa	LONEOS	NYS	1.5 km	MPC · JPL
161248	2003 CQ_{17}	—	February 6, 2003	Kitt Peak	Spacewatch	·	1.7 km	MPC · JPL
161249	2003 DA_{4}	—	February 22, 2003	Palomar	NEAT	·	1.1 km	MPC · JPL
161250	2003 EL_{20}	—	March 6, 2003	Anderson Mesa	LONEOS	·	1.3 km	MPC · JPL
161251	2003 EQ_{23}	—	March 6, 2003	Socorro	LINEAR	NYS	2.1 km	MPC · JPL
161252	2003 EC_{28}	—	March 6, 2003	Socorro	LINEAR	·	3.1 km	MPC · JPL
161253	2003 EO_{37}	—	March 8, 2003	Anderson Mesa	LONEOS	·	3.2 km	MPC · JPL
161254	2003 EH_{41}	—	March 9, 2003	Kitt Peak	Spacewatch	VER	3.6 km	MPC · JPL
161255	2003 EO_{47}	—	March 9, 2003	Socorro	LINEAR	(5)	2.1 km	MPC · JPL
161256	2003 EP_{53}	—	March 9, 2003	Socorro	LINEAR	JUN	1.9 km	MPC · JPL
161257	2003 FD_{2}	—	March 23, 2003	Drebach	Drebach	·	1.7 km	MPC · JPL
161258	2003 FM_{5}	—	March 26, 2003	Campo Imperatore	CINEOS	·	2.7 km	MPC · JPL
161259	2003 FN_{6}	—	March 26, 2003	Kleť	M. Tichý, Kočer, M.	·	2.1 km	MPC · JPL
161260	2003 FU_{16}	—	March 23, 2003	Kvistaberg	Uppsala-DLR Asteroid Survey	·	5.4 km	MPC · JPL
161261	2003 FS_{26}	—	March 24, 2003	Kitt Peak	Spacewatch	·	3.6 km	MPC · JPL
161262	2003 FQ_{28}	—	March 24, 2003	Haleakala	NEAT	·	1.7 km	MPC · JPL
161263	2003 FQ_{31}	—	March 23, 2003	Kitt Peak	Spacewatch	·	1.2 km	MPC · JPL
161264	2003 FQ_{42}	—	March 23, 2003	Kitt Peak	Spacewatch	·	2.0 km	MPC · JPL
161265	2003 FR_{46}	—	March 24, 2003	Kitt Peak	Spacewatch	·	1.4 km	MPC · JPL
161266	2003 FG_{50}	—	March 24, 2003	Haleakala	NEAT	·	3.2 km	MPC · JPL
161267	2003 FD_{54}	—	March 25, 2003	Haleakala	NEAT	·	1.3 km	MPC · JPL
161268	2003 FJ_{61}	—	March 26, 2003	Palomar	NEAT	·	1.8 km	MPC · JPL
161269	2003 FM_{66}	—	March 26, 2003	Palomar	NEAT	·	1.2 km	MPC · JPL
161270	2003 FV_{66}	—	March 26, 2003	Palomar	NEAT	·	2.1 km	MPC · JPL
161271	2003 FK_{73}	—	March 26, 2003	Haleakala	NEAT	EUN	1.9 km	MPC · JPL
161272	2003 FD_{83}	—	March 27, 2003	Palomar	NEAT	·	3.0 km	MPC · JPL
161273	2003 FL_{83}	—	March 27, 2003	Palomar	NEAT	·	1.3 km	MPC · JPL
161274	2003 FT_{84}	—	March 28, 2003	Anderson Mesa	LONEOS	·	1.4 km	MPC · JPL
161275	2003 FU_{99}	—	March 31, 2003	Kitt Peak	Spacewatch	·	1.9 km	MPC · JPL
161276	2003 FD_{107}	—	March 30, 2003	Socorro	LINEAR	·	2.9 km	MPC · JPL
161277	2003 FR_{117}	—	March 25, 2003	Palomar	NEAT	·	3.6 km	MPC · JPL
161278 Cesarmendoza	2003 FW_{128}	Cesarmendoza	March 24, 2003	Mérida	Ferrin, I. R., Leal, C.	·	4.0 km	MPC · JPL
161279	2003 FB_{131}	—	March 22, 2003	Palomar	NEAT	·	2.1 km	MPC · JPL
161280	2003 GP_{4}	—	April 1, 2003	Socorro	LINEAR	ADE	4.1 km	MPC · JPL
161281	2003 GH_{14}	—	April 1, 2003	Socorro	LINEAR	·	5.2 km	MPC · JPL
161282	2003 GE_{18}	—	April 4, 2003	Kitt Peak	Spacewatch	VER	3.7 km	MPC · JPL
161283	2003 GE_{35}	—	April 8, 2003	Socorro	LINEAR	·	1.5 km	MPC · JPL
161284	2003 GL_{43}	—	April 9, 2003	Socorro	LINEAR	·	1.5 km	MPC · JPL
161285	2003 HU_{11}	—	April 25, 2003	Anderson Mesa	LONEOS	·	1.1 km	MPC · JPL
161286	2003 HZ_{19}	—	April 26, 2003	Haleakala	NEAT	·	1.5 km	MPC · JPL
161287	2003 HN_{20}	—	April 24, 2003	Anderson Mesa	LONEOS	slow	2.1 km	MPC · JPL
161288	2003 HQ_{22}	—	April 24, 2003	Kitt Peak	Spacewatch	·	1.4 km	MPC · JPL
161289	2003 HK_{23}	—	April 25, 2003	Kitt Peak	Spacewatch	·	850 m	MPC · JPL
161290	2003 HU_{28}	—	April 26, 2003	Haleakala	NEAT	·	1.5 km	MPC · JPL
161291	2003 HV_{29}	—	April 28, 2003	Anderson Mesa	LONEOS	·	2.5 km	MPC · JPL
161292	2003 HV_{44}	—	April 28, 2003	Haleakala	NEAT	·	2.0 km	MPC · JPL
161293	2003 HR_{46}	—	April 28, 2003	Socorro	LINEAR	·	1.3 km	MPC · JPL
161294	2003 JH_{14}	—	May 8, 2003	Haleakala	NEAT	·	3.9 km	MPC · JPL
161295	2003 JF_{16}	—	May 6, 2003	Kitt Peak	Spacewatch	·	1.5 km	MPC · JPL
161296	2003 KO_{3}	—	May 23, 2003	Kitt Peak	Spacewatch	·	3.0 km	MPC · JPL
161297	2003 KG_{33}	—	May 27, 2003	Kitt Peak	Spacewatch	·	4.3 km	MPC · JPL
161298	2003 LN_{4}	—	June 4, 2003	Socorro	LINEAR	·	3.8 km	MPC · JPL
161299	2003 LR_{4}	—	June 5, 2003	Nogales	Tenagra II	NYS	1.8 km	MPC · JPL
161300	2003 LJ_{5}	—	June 6, 2003	Kitt Peak	Spacewatch	·	4.7 km	MPC · JPL

== 161301–161400 ==
back to top

Designation			Discovery			Properties		Ref
Permanent	Provisional	Named after	Date	Site	Discoverer(s)	Category	Diam.	Ref
161301	2003 MH_{1}	—	June 22, 2003	Socorro	LINEAR	PHO	4.2 km	MPC · JPL
161302	2003 NK_{2}	—	July 3, 2003	Reedy Creek	J. Broughton	NYS	2.1 km	MPC · JPL
161303	2003 NT_{6}	—	July 6, 2003	Reedy Creek	J. Broughton	·	2.4 km	MPC · JPL
161304	2003 NQ_{9}	—	July 3, 2003	Anderson Mesa	LONEOS	·	5.7 km	MPC · JPL
161305	2003 OQ_{1}	—	July 21, 2003	Haleakala	NEAT	·	3.9 km	MPC · JPL
161306	2003 OB_{2}	—	July 22, 2003	Haleakala	NEAT	V	1.3 km	MPC · JPL
161307	2003 OR_{2}	—	July 22, 2003	Haleakala	NEAT	NYS	2.1 km	MPC · JPL
161308	2003 OU_{20}	—	July 31, 2003	Reedy Creek	J. Broughton	·	2.5 km	MPC · JPL
161309	2003 OC_{22}	—	July 29, 2003	Socorro	LINEAR	·	3.9 km	MPC · JPL
161310	2003 OE_{28}	—	July 24, 2003	Palomar	NEAT	EUN	1.9 km	MPC · JPL
161311	2003 OY_{28}	—	July 24, 2003	Palomar	NEAT	·	1.6 km	MPC · JPL
161312	2003 OY_{30}	—	July 30, 2003	Socorro	LINEAR	·	2.1 km	MPC · JPL
161313	2003 PZ_{10}	—	August 4, 2003	Socorro	LINEAR	·	1.6 km	MPC · JPL
161314	2003 QQ_{3}	—	August 17, 2003	Haleakala	NEAT	·	2.0 km	MPC · JPL
161315 de Shalit	2003 QS_{5}	de Shalit	August 19, 2003	Wise	Polishook, D.	(5)	1.6 km	MPC · JPL
161316	2003 QH_{6}	—	August 18, 2003	Campo Imperatore	CINEOS	·	2.6 km	MPC · JPL
161317	2003 QQ_{15}	—	August 20, 2003	Palomar	NEAT	·	3.4 km	MPC · JPL
161318	2003 QB_{18}	—	August 22, 2003	Palomar	NEAT	·	1.9 km	MPC · JPL
161319	2003 QJ_{28}	—	August 21, 2003	Črni Vrh	Skvarč, J.	NYS	2.5 km	MPC · JPL
161320	2003 QE_{33}	—	August 22, 2003	Campo Imperatore	CINEOS	·	3.6 km	MPC · JPL
161321	2003 QR_{33}	—	August 22, 2003	Socorro	LINEAR	·	3.0 km	MPC · JPL
161322	2003 QZ_{33}	—	August 22, 2003	Palomar	NEAT	·	2.0 km	MPC · JPL
161323	2003 QF_{39}	—	August 22, 2003	Palomar	NEAT	·	2.3 km	MPC · JPL
161324	2003 QE_{41}	—	August 22, 2003	Socorro	LINEAR	·	1.8 km	MPC · JPL
161325	2003 QZ_{49}	—	August 22, 2003	Palomar	NEAT	·	1.6 km	MPC · JPL
161326	2003 QC_{60}	—	August 23, 2003	Socorro	LINEAR	·	2.6 km	MPC · JPL
161327	2003 QS_{63}	—	August 23, 2003	Socorro	LINEAR	·	3.5 km	MPC · JPL
161328	2003 QV_{66}	—	August 22, 2003	Socorro	LINEAR	(1547)	3.5 km	MPC · JPL
161329	2003 QO_{72}	—	August 23, 2003	Socorro	LINEAR	·	2.1 km	MPC · JPL
161330	2003 QY_{79}	—	August 26, 2003	Reedy Creek	J. Broughton	·	2.0 km	MPC · JPL
161331	2003 QA_{90}	—	August 25, 2003	Socorro	LINEAR	·	3.4 km	MPC · JPL
161332	2003 QX_{93}	—	August 28, 2003	Haleakala	NEAT	MAR	2.0 km	MPC · JPL
161333	2003 QR_{99}	—	August 28, 2003	Socorro	LINEAR	·	1.8 km	MPC · JPL
161334	2003 QY_{103}	—	August 31, 2003	Haleakala	NEAT	T_{j} (2.99) · 3:2	9.2 km	MPC · JPL
161335	2003 QQ_{114}	—	August 24, 2003	Socorro	LINEAR	·	1.7 km	MPC · JPL
161336	2003 RQ_{1}	—	September 2, 2003	Reedy Creek	J. Broughton	(22805)	7.3 km	MPC · JPL
161337	2003 RB_{22}	—	September 14, 2003	Haleakala	NEAT	·	3.8 km	MPC · JPL
161338	2003 SC_{4}	—	September 16, 2003	Kitt Peak	Spacewatch	·	5.5 km	MPC · JPL
161339	2003 SL_{22}	—	September 16, 2003	Kitt Peak	Spacewatch	·	3.6 km	MPC · JPL
161340	2003 SK_{37}	—	September 16, 2003	Palomar	NEAT	·	4.5 km	MPC · JPL
161341	2003 SM_{41}	—	September 17, 2003	Palomar	NEAT	·	3.9 km	MPC · JPL
161342	2003 SQ_{44}	—	September 16, 2003	Anderson Mesa	LONEOS	PAD	4.8 km	MPC · JPL
161343	2003 SL_{62}	—	September 17, 2003	Kitt Peak	Spacewatch	·	3.5 km	MPC · JPL
161344	2003 SU_{64}	—	September 18, 2003	Campo Imperatore	CINEOS	(5)	2.0 km	MPC · JPL
161345	2003 SX_{64}	—	September 18, 2003	Campo Imperatore	CINEOS	·	1.8 km	MPC · JPL
161346	2003 SG_{89}	—	September 18, 2003	Palomar	NEAT	·	2.4 km	MPC · JPL
161347	2003 SP_{94}	—	September 19, 2003	Campo Imperatore	CINEOS	·	3.8 km	MPC · JPL
161348	2003 SR_{103}	—	September 20, 2003	Socorro	LINEAR	RAF	1.5 km	MPC · JPL
161349 Mecsek	2003 SJ_{127}	Mecsek	September 19, 2003	Piszkéstető	K. Sárneczky, B. Sipőcz	·	2.7 km	MPC · JPL
161350	2003 SM_{140}	—	September 19, 2003	Socorro	LINEAR	(5)	2.0 km	MPC · JPL
161351	2003 SR_{140}	—	September 19, 2003	Palomar	NEAT	·	3.3 km	MPC · JPL
161352	2003 SY_{140}	—	September 19, 2003	Palomar	NEAT	TIR	5.4 km	MPC · JPL
161353	2003 SV_{142}	—	September 20, 2003	Socorro	LINEAR	·	2.6 km	MPC · JPL
161354	2003 SH_{149}	—	September 16, 2003	Kitt Peak	Spacewatch	·	5.1 km	MPC · JPL
161355	2003 SG_{152}	—	September 19, 2003	Anderson Mesa	LONEOS	·	1.8 km	MPC · JPL
161356	2003 SS_{157}	—	September 19, 2003	Anderson Mesa	LONEOS	·	3.4 km	MPC · JPL
161357	2003 SB_{162}	—	September 18, 2003	Kitt Peak	Spacewatch	AGN	2.2 km	MPC · JPL
161358	2003 SC_{163}	—	September 19, 2003	Kitt Peak	Spacewatch	(12739)	2.8 km	MPC · JPL
161359	2003 SU_{164}	—	September 20, 2003	Anderson Mesa	LONEOS	·	2.8 km	MPC · JPL
161360	2003 SR_{165}	—	September 20, 2003	Anderson Mesa	LONEOS	(5)	5.3 km	MPC · JPL
161361	2003 SS_{165}	—	September 20, 2003	Anderson Mesa	LONEOS	·	3.1 km	MPC · JPL
161362	2003 SC_{182}	—	September 20, 2003	Socorro	LINEAR	EUN	2.1 km	MPC · JPL
161363	2003 SF_{192}	—	September 19, 2003	Haleakala	NEAT	·	2.9 km	MPC · JPL
161364	2003 SJ_{198}	—	September 21, 2003	Anderson Mesa	LONEOS	·	4.1 km	MPC · JPL
161365	2003 SD_{199}	—	September 21, 2003	Anderson Mesa	LONEOS	·	3.4 km	MPC · JPL
161366	2003 SX_{207}	—	September 26, 2003	Socorro	LINEAR	(12739)	2.6 km	MPC · JPL
161367	2003 SP_{208}	—	September 23, 2003	Palomar	NEAT	·	2.1 km	MPC · JPL
161368	2003 SD_{226}	—	September 26, 2003	Socorro	LINEAR	NEM	3.6 km	MPC · JPL
161369	2003 SK_{228}	—	September 28, 2003	Kitt Peak	Spacewatch	·	2.7 km	MPC · JPL
161370	2003 SJ_{233}	—	September 25, 2003	Palomar	NEAT	·	2.7 km	MPC · JPL
161371 Bertrandou	2003 SO_{244}	Bertrandou	September 25, 2003	Saint-Sulpice	B. Christophe	·	2.3 km	MPC · JPL
161372	2003 SM_{247}	—	September 26, 2003	Socorro	LINEAR	·	5.3 km	MPC · JPL
161373	2003 SN_{259}	—	September 28, 2003	Kitt Peak	Spacewatch	·	3.6 km	MPC · JPL
161374	2003 SA_{272}	—	September 27, 2003	Kitt Peak	Spacewatch	·	2.5 km	MPC · JPL
161375	2003 SF_{291}	—	September 29, 2003	Socorro	LINEAR	·	3.9 km	MPC · JPL
161376	2003 SH_{291}	—	September 29, 2003	Socorro	LINEAR	·	2.9 km	MPC · JPL
161377	2003 SX_{292}	—	September 26, 2003	Črni Vrh	S. Matičič, J. Skvarč	EUN	2.1 km	MPC · JPL
161378	2003 ST_{293}	—	September 27, 2003	Kitt Peak	Spacewatch	·	2.9 km	MPC · JPL
161379	2003 SE_{298}	—	September 18, 2003	Haleakala	NEAT	·	2.9 km	MPC · JPL
161380	2003 SD_{304}	—	September 17, 2003	Palomar	NEAT	MAR	2.2 km	MPC · JPL
161381	2003 TH_{7}	—	October 1, 2003	Anderson Mesa	LONEOS	·	2.4 km	MPC · JPL
161382	2003 TJ_{11}	—	October 14, 2003	Anderson Mesa	LONEOS	PAD	4.5 km	MPC · JPL
161383	2003 TH_{15}	—	October 15, 2003	Anderson Mesa	LONEOS	·	2.2 km	MPC · JPL
161384	2003 UK_{25}	—	October 24, 2003	Wrightwood	J. W. Young	WIT	2.0 km	MPC · JPL
161385	2003 UM_{27}	—	October 23, 2003	Goodricke-Pigott	R. A. Tucker	·	3.8 km	MPC · JPL
161386	2003 UB_{28}	—	October 21, 2003	Socorro	LINEAR	AGN	2.0 km	MPC · JPL
161387	2003 UX_{40}	—	October 16, 2003	Anderson Mesa	LONEOS	(5)	2.0 km	MPC · JPL
161388	2003 UH_{62}	—	October 16, 2003	Anderson Mesa	LONEOS	·	4.0 km	MPC · JPL
161389	2003 UL_{78}	—	October 17, 2003	Črni Vrh	Matičič, S.	·	4.1 km	MPC · JPL
161390	2003 UB_{81}	—	October 16, 2003	Anderson Mesa	LONEOS	EUN	2.1 km	MPC · JPL
161391	2003 UF_{97}	—	October 19, 2003	Kitt Peak	Spacewatch	AST	3.4 km	MPC · JPL
161392	2003 UU_{116}	—	October 21, 2003	Socorro	LINEAR	·	1.9 km	MPC · JPL
161393	2003 UJ_{122}	—	October 19, 2003	Kitt Peak	Spacewatch	NEM	3.3 km	MPC · JPL
161394	2003 UL_{130}	—	October 18, 2003	Palomar	NEAT	·	4.9 km	MPC · JPL
161395	2003 UM_{131}	—	October 19, 2003	Palomar	NEAT	615	2.4 km	MPC · JPL
161396	2003 UR_{132}	—	October 19, 2003	Palomar	NEAT	·	4.7 km	MPC · JPL
161397	2003 UU_{140}	—	October 16, 2003	Palomar	NEAT	·	2.5 km	MPC · JPL
161398	2003 UY_{162}	—	October 21, 2003	Socorro	LINEAR	·	4.2 km	MPC · JPL
161399	2003 UB_{163}	—	October 21, 2003	Socorro	LINEAR	·	4.3 km	MPC · JPL
161400	2003 UV_{164}	—	October 21, 2003	Socorro	LINEAR	HOF	3.8 km	MPC · JPL

== 161401–161500 ==
back to top

Designation			Discovery			Properties		Ref
Permanent	Provisional	Named after	Date	Site	Discoverer(s)	Category	Diam.	Ref
161401	2003 UT_{166}	—	October 21, 2003	Kitt Peak	Spacewatch	HOF	4.7 km	MPC · JPL
161402	2003 UP_{168}	—	October 22, 2003	Socorro	LINEAR	AGN	2.2 km	MPC · JPL
161403	2003 UH_{181}	—	October 21, 2003	Socorro	LINEAR	AGN	2.2 km	MPC · JPL
161404	2003 UD_{190}	—	October 22, 2003	Kitt Peak	Spacewatch	·	3.2 km	MPC · JPL
161405	2003 UF_{202}	—	October 21, 2003	Socorro	LINEAR	·	3.2 km	MPC · JPL
161406	2003 UJ_{202}	—	October 21, 2003	Socorro	LINEAR	·	2.4 km	MPC · JPL
161407	2003 UB_{213}	—	October 23, 2003	Kitt Peak	Spacewatch	·	1.6 km	MPC · JPL
161408	2003 UC_{213}	—	October 23, 2003	Kitt Peak	Spacewatch	HOF	5.1 km	MPC · JPL
161409	2003 UG_{234}	—	October 24, 2003	Socorro	LINEAR	·	3.6 km	MPC · JPL
161410	2003 UP_{237}	—	October 23, 2003	Kitt Peak	Spacewatch	·	4.4 km	MPC · JPL
161411	2003 UD_{238}	—	October 23, 2003	Haleakala	NEAT	·	4.8 km	MPC · JPL
161412	2003 UW_{245}	—	October 24, 2003	Socorro	LINEAR	·	2.8 km	MPC · JPL
161413	2003 UG_{246}	—	October 24, 2003	Socorro	LINEAR	·	2.4 km	MPC · JPL
161414	2003 UD_{253}	—	October 27, 2003	Socorro	LINEAR	·	3.0 km	MPC · JPL
161415	2003 UM_{253}	—	October 22, 2003	Palomar	NEAT	·	4.0 km	MPC · JPL
161416	2003 UU_{254}	—	October 24, 2003	Socorro	LINEAR	·	4.1 km	MPC · JPL
161417	2003 UJ_{264}	—	October 27, 2003	Socorro	LINEAR	PAD	3.7 km	MPC · JPL
161418	2003 UL_{267}	—	October 28, 2003	Socorro	LINEAR	·	4.7 km	MPC · JPL
161419	2003 UL_{276}	—	October 29, 2003	Socorro	LINEAR	·	2.2 km	MPC · JPL
161420	2003 UM_{276}	—	October 29, 2003	Socorro	LINEAR	EUP	9.1 km	MPC · JPL
161421	2003 WC_{6}	—	November 18, 2003	Palomar	NEAT	·	2.1 km	MPC · JPL
161422	2003 WK_{17}	—	November 18, 2003	Palomar	NEAT	·	3.0 km	MPC · JPL
161423	2003 WE_{26}	—	November 18, 2003	Goodricke-Pigott	R. A. Tucker	·	3.0 km	MPC · JPL
161424	2003 WC_{39}	—	November 19, 2003	Kitt Peak	Spacewatch	V	900 m	MPC · JPL
161425	2003 WC_{41}	—	November 19, 2003	Kitt Peak	Spacewatch	·	2.7 km	MPC · JPL
161426	2003 WN_{42}	—	November 19, 2003	Palomar	NEAT	·	6.5 km	MPC · JPL
161427	2003 WC_{55}	—	November 20, 2003	Socorro	LINEAR	HOF	4.3 km	MPC · JPL
161428	2003 WD_{57}	—	November 18, 2003	Palomar	NEAT	·	3.4 km	MPC · JPL
161429	2003 WY_{72}	—	November 20, 2003	Socorro	LINEAR	·	4.6 km	MPC · JPL
161430	2003 WP_{81}	—	November 18, 2003	Socorro	LINEAR	EUN	2.4 km	MPC · JPL
161431	2003 WG_{83}	—	November 20, 2003	Socorro	LINEAR	MAR	2.6 km	MPC · JPL
161432	2003 WN_{83}	—	November 20, 2003	Socorro	LINEAR	·	4.5 km	MPC · JPL
161433	2003 WY_{100}	—	November 21, 2003	Catalina	CSS	(5)	1.8 km	MPC · JPL
161434	2003 WT_{133}	—	November 21, 2003	Socorro	LINEAR	·	2.6 km	MPC · JPL
161435	2003 WB_{150}	—	November 24, 2003	Anderson Mesa	LONEOS	MRX	1.6 km	MPC · JPL
161436	2003 WL_{159}	—	November 29, 2003	Socorro	LINEAR	·	6.6 km	MPC · JPL
161437	2003 WJ_{170}	—	November 20, 2003	Palomar	NEAT	(194)	3.5 km	MPC · JPL
161438	2003 WY_{170}	—	November 21, 2003	Palomar	NEAT	ADE	4.1 km	MPC · JPL
161439	2003 WM_{171}	—	November 23, 2003	Anderson Mesa	LONEOS	DOR	4.6 km	MPC · JPL
161440	2003 WA_{172}	—	November 29, 2003	Socorro	LINEAR	·	2.6 km	MPC · JPL
161441	2003 XV_{9}	—	December 4, 2003	Socorro	LINEAR	·	3.8 km	MPC · JPL
161442	2003 YU_{14}	—	December 17, 2003	Socorro	LINEAR	(1118)	6.0 km	MPC · JPL
161443	2003 YK_{26}	—	December 18, 2003	Socorro	LINEAR	·	5.5 km	MPC · JPL
161444	2003 YX_{32}	—	December 16, 2003	Kitt Peak	Spacewatch	·	6.7 km	MPC · JPL
161445	2003 YN_{45}	—	December 17, 2003	Socorro	LINEAR	·	3.5 km	MPC · JPL
161446	2003 YM_{46}	—	December 17, 2003	Socorro	LINEAR	EOS	3.4 km	MPC · JPL
161447	2003 YF_{47}	—	December 17, 2003	Kitt Peak	Spacewatch	·	4.9 km	MPC · JPL
161448	2003 YK_{63}	—	December 19, 2003	Socorro	LINEAR	·	4.0 km	MPC · JPL
161449	2003 YX_{91}	—	December 21, 2003	Kitt Peak	Spacewatch	EOS	5.1 km	MPC · JPL
161450	2003 YK_{103}	—	December 20, 2003	Socorro	LINEAR	·	8.2 km	MPC · JPL
161451	2003 YM_{119}	—	December 27, 2003	Socorro	LINEAR	·	1.2 km	MPC · JPL
161452	2003 YJ_{139}	—	December 28, 2003	Socorro	LINEAR	·	3.6 km	MPC · JPL
161453	2003 YE_{158}	—	December 17, 2003	Socorro	LINEAR	EUN	2.6 km	MPC · JPL
161454	2003 YD_{180}	—	December 18, 2003	Kitt Peak	Spacewatch	·	1.2 km	MPC · JPL
161455	2004 AR	—	January 12, 2004	Palomar	NEAT	·	2.1 km	MPC · JPL
161456	2004 AH_{26}	—	January 13, 2004	Palomar	NEAT	EOS	3.0 km	MPC · JPL
161457	2004 BV	—	January 16, 2004	Kitt Peak	Spacewatch	·	4.9 km	MPC · JPL
161458	2004 BP_{2}	—	January 16, 2004	Palomar	NEAT	VER	4.4 km	MPC · JPL
161459	2004 BQ_{22}	—	January 17, 2004	Kitt Peak	Spacewatch	·	6.4 km	MPC · JPL
161460	2004 BU_{44}	—	January 21, 2004	Socorro	LINEAR	·	1.2 km	MPC · JPL
161461	2004 BS_{56}	—	January 23, 2004	Anderson Mesa	LONEOS	·	2.8 km	MPC · JPL
161462	2004 BE_{116}	—	January 26, 2004	Anderson Mesa	LONEOS	·	5.9 km	MPC · JPL
161463	2004 CY_{1}	—	February 12, 2004	Palomar	NEAT	EUP	8.4 km	MPC · JPL
161464	2004 CE_{35}	—	February 10, 2004	Palomar	NEAT	·	1.9 km	MPC · JPL
161465	2004 CY_{70}	—	February 12, 2004	Kitt Peak	Spacewatch	(11882)	2.9 km	MPC · JPL
161466	2004 CA_{83}	—	February 12, 2004	Kitt Peak	Spacewatch	·	7.5 km	MPC · JPL
161467	2004 DY_{17}	—	February 18, 2004	Socorro	LINEAR	·	1.9 km	MPC · JPL
161468	2004 DE_{31}	—	February 17, 2004	Socorro	LINEAR	·	2.6 km	MPC · JPL
161469	2004 EC_{79}	—	March 15, 2004	Kitt Peak	Spacewatch	·	1.6 km	MPC · JPL
161470	2004 EV_{80}	—	March 15, 2004	Socorro	LINEAR	·	1.1 km	MPC · JPL
161471	2004 FE_{12}	—	March 16, 2004	Socorro	LINEAR	·	2.5 km	MPC · JPL
161472	2004 FG_{20}	—	March 16, 2004	Socorro	LINEAR	NYS	1.6 km	MPC · JPL
161473	2004 FC_{40}	—	March 18, 2004	Socorro	LINEAR	·	1.2 km	MPC · JPL
161474	2004 FE_{40}	—	March 18, 2004	Socorro	LINEAR	·	1.2 km	MPC · JPL
161475	2004 FY_{92}	—	March 19, 2004	Socorro	LINEAR	NYS	2.5 km	MPC · JPL
161476	2004 FS_{96}	—	March 23, 2004	Socorro	LINEAR	·	2.4 km	MPC · JPL
161477	2004 FJ_{160}	—	March 18, 2004	Socorro	LINEAR	·	5.3 km	MPC · JPL
161478	2004 GX_{25}	—	April 14, 2004	Kitt Peak	Spacewatch	CYB	6.4 km	MPC · JPL
161479	2004 GU_{27}	—	April 15, 2004	Palomar	NEAT	H	1.1 km	MPC · JPL
161480	2004 GX_{38}	—	April 15, 2004	Anderson Mesa	LONEOS	·	2.3 km	MPC · JPL
161481	2004 GQ_{60}	—	April 14, 2004	Kitt Peak	Spacewatch	·	2.4 km	MPC · JPL
161482	2004 GL_{61}	—	April 13, 2004	Kitt Peak	Spacewatch	·	2.5 km	MPC · JPL
161483	2004 GA_{87}	—	April 14, 2004	Siding Spring	SSS	·	2.1 km	MPC · JPL
161484	2004 HU_{42}	—	April 20, 2004	Socorro	LINEAR	L4	20 km	MPC · JPL
161485	2004 HZ_{47}	—	April 22, 2004	Siding Spring	SSS	·	1.6 km	MPC · JPL
161486	2004 HE_{52}	—	April 24, 2004	Kitt Peak	Spacewatch	·	3.1 km	MPC · JPL
161487	2004 JO_{15}	—	May 10, 2004	Palomar	NEAT	·	1.3 km	MPC · JPL
161488	2004 JC_{18}	—	May 13, 2004	Anderson Mesa	LONEOS	·	1.5 km	MPC · JPL
161489	2004 KN_{6}	—	May 18, 2004	Socorro	LINEAR	L4	10 km	MPC · JPL
161490	2004 KY_{7}	—	May 19, 2004	Needville	J. Dellinger, P. G. A. Garossino	·	1.1 km	MPC · JPL
161491	2004 KJ_{10}	—	May 20, 2004	Siding Spring	SSS	·	4.2 km	MPC · JPL
161492	2004 LG_{2}	—	June 10, 2004	Reedy Creek	J. Broughton	·	2.4 km	MPC · JPL
161493	2004 LL_{6}	—	June 9, 2004	Siding Spring	SSS	·	3.2 km	MPC · JPL
161494	2004 LN_{14}	—	June 11, 2004	Socorro	LINEAR	·	3.7 km	MPC · JPL
161495	2004 MA_{1}	—	June 16, 2004	Socorro	LINEAR	PHO	1.7 km	MPC · JPL
161496	2004 NY	—	July 7, 2004	Campo Imperatore	CINEOS	·	3.7 km	MPC · JPL
161497	2004 NY_{32}	—	July 11, 2004	Socorro	LINEAR	·	2.0 km	MPC · JPL
161498	2004 PT_{69}	—	August 7, 2004	Palomar	NEAT	·	3.1 km	MPC · JPL
161499	2004 PE_{82}	—	August 10, 2004	Socorro	LINEAR	·	3.7 km	MPC · JPL
161500	2004 RW_{13}	—	September 6, 2004	Siding Spring	SSS	·	8.5 km	MPC · JPL

== 161501–161600 ==
back to top

Designation			Discovery			Properties		Ref
Permanent	Provisional	Named after	Date	Site	Discoverer(s)	Category	Diam.	Ref
161501	2004 RV_{19}	—	September 7, 2004	Socorro	LINEAR	·	1.6 km	MPC · JPL
161502	2004 RP_{26}	—	September 6, 2004	Palomar	NEAT	VER	3.9 km	MPC · JPL
161503	2004 RD_{45}	—	September 8, 2004	Socorro	LINEAR	ANF	2.3 km	MPC · JPL
161504	2004 RD_{54}	—	September 8, 2004	Socorro	LINEAR	·	6.7 km	MPC · JPL
161505	2004 RU_{68}	—	September 8, 2004	Socorro	LINEAR	·	2.1 km	MPC · JPL
161506	2004 RR_{79}	—	September 8, 2004	Palomar	NEAT	PHO	1.7 km	MPC · JPL
161507	2004 RU_{82}	—	September 9, 2004	Socorro	LINEAR	·	1.5 km	MPC · JPL
161508	2004 RW_{88}	—	September 8, 2004	Socorro	LINEAR	·	4.1 km	MPC · JPL
161509	2004 RB_{99}	—	September 8, 2004	Socorro	LINEAR	·	790 m	MPC · JPL
161510	2004 RA_{150}	—	September 9, 2004	Socorro	LINEAR	·	1.4 km	MPC · JPL
161511	2004 RP_{179}	—	September 10, 2004	Socorro	LINEAR	·	3.9 km	MPC · JPL
161512	2004 RD_{190}	—	September 10, 2004	Socorro	LINEAR	EOS	3.3 km	MPC · JPL
161513	2004 RK_{195}	—	September 10, 2004	Socorro	LINEAR	·	1.4 km	MPC · JPL
161514	2004 RE_{288}	—	September 15, 2004	7300 Observatory	W. K. Y. Yeung	·	2.2 km	MPC · JPL
161515	2004 RO_{291}	—	September 10, 2004	Socorro	LINEAR	EOS ·	3.0 km	MPC · JPL
161516	2004 RR_{326}	—	September 13, 2004	Socorro	LINEAR	·	990 m	MPC · JPL
161517	2004 RZ_{328}	—	September 15, 2004	Kitt Peak	Spacewatch	(2076)	1.0 km	MPC · JPL
161518	2004 RK_{334}	—	September 15, 2004	Anderson Mesa	LONEOS	·	5.9 km	MPC · JPL
161519	2004 SQ_{11}	—	September 16, 2004	Siding Spring	SSS	PHO	2.9 km	MPC · JPL
161520	2004 SO_{32}	—	September 17, 2004	Socorro	LINEAR	·	5.2 km	MPC · JPL
161521	2004 SG_{51}	—	September 22, 2004	Kitt Peak	Spacewatch	·	3.3 km	MPC · JPL
161522	2004 SO_{57}	—	September 16, 2004	Anderson Mesa	LONEOS	EUN	2.5 km	MPC · JPL
161523	2004 SQ_{60}	—	September 17, 2004	Socorro	LINEAR	·	4.4 km	MPC · JPL
161524	2004 TU_{16}	—	October 8, 2004	Socorro	LINEAR	PHO	2.6 km	MPC · JPL
161525	2004 TH_{44}	—	October 4, 2004	Kitt Peak	Spacewatch	·	1.0 km	MPC · JPL
161526	2004 TF_{106}	—	October 7, 2004	Socorro	LINEAR	EUN	1.8 km	MPC · JPL
161527	2004 TG_{124}	—	October 7, 2004	Socorro	LINEAR	·	2.3 km	MPC · JPL
161528	2004 TE_{133}	—	October 7, 2004	Anderson Mesa	LONEOS	·	1.5 km	MPC · JPL
161529	2004 TR_{179}	—	October 7, 2004	Kitt Peak	Spacewatch	·	1.9 km	MPC · JPL
161530	2004 TQ_{293}	—	October 10, 2004	Kitt Peak	Spacewatch	NYS	1.8 km	MPC · JPL
161531	2004 TA_{296}	—	October 10, 2004	Kitt Peak	Spacewatch	·	1.4 km	MPC · JPL
161532	2004 TN_{342}	—	October 13, 2004	Kitt Peak	Spacewatch	·	1.9 km	MPC · JPL
161533	2004 TF_{345}	—	October 15, 2004	Mount Lemmon	Mount Lemmon Survey	·	1.4 km	MPC · JPL
161534	2004 TZ_{359}	—	October 9, 2004	Anderson Mesa	LONEOS	·	1.3 km	MPC · JPL
161535	2004 VR_{9}	—	November 3, 2004	Anderson Mesa	LONEOS	·	1.2 km	MPC · JPL
161536	2004 VA_{16}	—	November 3, 2004	Palomar	NEAT	·	1.9 km	MPC · JPL
161537	2004 VA_{24}	—	November 4, 2004	Catalina	CSS	·	1.1 km	MPC · JPL
161538	2004 VP_{26}	—	November 4, 2004	Catalina	CSS	·	1.2 km	MPC · JPL
161539	2004 VQ_{57}	—	November 5, 2004	Palomar	NEAT	·	2.0 km	MPC · JPL
161540	2004 VP_{77}	—	November 12, 2004	Catalina	CSS	EOS	3.5 km	MPC · JPL
161541	2004 VJ_{81}	—	November 4, 2004	Kitt Peak	Spacewatch	NYS	1.9 km	MPC · JPL
161542	2004 WF_{3}	—	November 17, 2004	Siding Spring	SSS	·	2.0 km	MPC · JPL
161543	2004 WH_{10}	—	November 19, 2004	Socorro	LINEAR	(883)	1.4 km	MPC · JPL
161544	2004 XQ_{13}	—	December 8, 2004	Socorro	LINEAR	MAS	1.7 km	MPC · JPL
161545 Ferrando	2004 XP_{16}	Ferrando	December 10, 2004	La Cañada	Lacruz, J.	PHO	1.7 km	MPC · JPL
161546 Schneeweis	2004 XT_{16}	Schneeweis	December 10, 2004	Junk Bond	D. Healy	·	2.3 km	MPC · JPL
161547	2004 XS_{29}	—	December 10, 2004	Socorro	LINEAR	·	2.5 km	MPC · JPL
161548	2004 XL_{49}	—	December 12, 2004	Palomar	NEAT	·	1.3 km	MPC · JPL
161549	2004 XN_{49}	—	December 12, 2004	Socorro	LINEAR	(2076)	1.5 km	MPC · JPL
161550	2004 XS_{54}	—	December 10, 2004	Kitt Peak	Spacewatch	·	1.3 km	MPC · JPL
161551	2004 XO_{72}	—	December 14, 2004	Kitt Peak	Spacewatch	·	1.4 km	MPC · JPL
161552	2004 XT_{80}	—	December 10, 2004	Socorro	LINEAR	·	1.5 km	MPC · JPL
161553	2004 XV_{102}	—	December 14, 2004	Catalina	CSS	·	1.3 km	MPC · JPL
161554	2004 XO_{121}	—	December 14, 2004	Catalina	CSS	·	4.3 km	MPC · JPL
161555	2004 XX_{121}	—	December 15, 2004	Socorro	LINEAR	·	1.5 km	MPC · JPL
161556	2004 XZ_{146}	—	December 15, 2004	Socorro	LINEAR	H	960 m	MPC · JPL
161557	2004 YF_{6}	—	December 16, 2004	Kitt Peak	Spacewatch	NYS	2.1 km	MPC · JPL
161558	2004 YF_{17}	—	December 18, 2004	Mount Lemmon	Mount Lemmon Survey	NYS	2.2 km	MPC · JPL
161559	2004 YO_{21}	—	December 18, 2004	Mount Lemmon	Mount Lemmon Survey	·	2.0 km	MPC · JPL
161560	2004 YW_{34}	—	December 18, 2004	Mount Lemmon	Mount Lemmon Survey	·	2.2 km	MPC · JPL
161561	2005 AR_{7}	—	January 6, 2005	Catalina	CSS	·	1.8 km	MPC · JPL
161562	2005 AU_{10}	—	January 6, 2005	Catalina	CSS	·	2.0 km	MPC · JPL
161563	2005 AB_{17}	—	January 6, 2005	Socorro	LINEAR	MAS	1.4 km	MPC · JPL
161564	2005 AF_{35}	—	January 13, 2005	Socorro	LINEAR	·	4.0 km	MPC · JPL
161565	2005 AD_{62}	—	January 15, 2005	Kitt Peak	Spacewatch	·	4.3 km	MPC · JPL
161566	2005 AH_{64}	—	January 13, 2005	Kitt Peak	Spacewatch	LIX	6.1 km	MPC · JPL
161567	2005 BX	—	January 16, 2005	Hormersdorf	Lorenz, J.	(5)	2.0 km	MPC · JPL
161568	2005 BC_{2}	—	January 17, 2005	Socorro	LINEAR	PAD	3.9 km	MPC · JPL
161569	2005 BH_{17}	—	January 16, 2005	Kitt Peak	Spacewatch	·	2.0 km	MPC · JPL
161570	2005 BR_{23}	—	January 17, 2005	Kitt Peak	Spacewatch	·	5.0 km	MPC · JPL
161571	2005 CB_{6}	—	February 1, 2005	Kitt Peak	Spacewatch	·	6.8 km	MPC · JPL
161572	2005 CP_{50}	—	February 2, 2005	Socorro	LINEAR	EMA	6.2 km	MPC · JPL
161573	2005 CX_{57}	—	February 2, 2005	Catalina	CSS	·	4.4 km	MPC · JPL
161574	2005 DS	—	February 28, 2005	Junk Bond	Junk Bond	·	5.5 km	MPC · JPL
161575	2005 EZ_{10}	—	March 2, 2005	Kitt Peak	Spacewatch	·	3.7 km	MPC · JPL
161576	2005 EY_{47}	—	March 3, 2005	Catalina	CSS	·	4.5 km	MPC · JPL
161577	2005 EK_{72}	—	March 2, 2005	Catalina	CSS	EOS	4.2 km	MPC · JPL
161578	2005 EL_{85}	—	March 4, 2005	Socorro	LINEAR	EOS	3.8 km	MPC · JPL
161579	2005 EH_{121}	—	March 8, 2005	Socorro	LINEAR	NYS	1.1 km	MPC · JPL
161580	2005 EV_{122}	—	March 8, 2005	Mount Lemmon	Mount Lemmon Survey	·	5.3 km	MPC · JPL
161581	2005 EA_{204}	—	March 11, 2005	Kitt Peak	Spacewatch	TIR	4.9 km	MPC · JPL
161582	2005 ET_{219}	—	March 10, 2005	Mount Lemmon	Mount Lemmon Survey	·	1.2 km	MPC · JPL
161583	2005 GZ_{119}	—	April 6, 2005	Anderson Mesa	LONEOS	·	3.3 km	MPC · JPL
161584	2005 GN_{123}	—	April 7, 2005	Kitt Peak	Spacewatch	·	5.1 km	MPC · JPL
161585 Danielhals	2005 GN_{184}	Danielhals	April 10, 2005	Kitt Peak	M. W. Buie	THM	3.4 km	MPC · JPL
161586	2005 JO_{88}	—	May 10, 2005	Mount Lemmon	Mount Lemmon Survey	·	1.9 km	MPC · JPL
161587	2005 LC_{7}	—	June 1, 2005	Kitt Peak	Spacewatch	·	1.4 km	MPC · JPL
161588	2005 LE_{30}	—	June 12, 2005	Kitt Peak	Spacewatch	·	3.4 km	MPC · JPL
161589	2005 MF_{49}	—	June 29, 2005	Palomar	NEAT	·	1.8 km	MPC · JPL
161590	2005 NO_{49}	—	July 8, 2005	Kitt Peak	Spacewatch	·	5.8 km	MPC · JPL
161591	2005 OG_{14}	—	July 31, 2005	Siding Spring	SSS	MAS	1.4 km	MPC · JPL
161592 Sarahhamilton	2005 PN_{24}	Sarahhamilton	August 10, 2005	Cerro Tololo	M. W. Buie	(5)	1.1 km	MPC · JPL
161593	2005 QE_{28}	—	August 28, 2005	Junk Bond	D. Healy	SUL	2.8 km	MPC · JPL
161594	2005 QR_{171}	—	August 29, 2005	Palomar	NEAT	·	1.3 km	MPC · JPL
161595	2005 SK_{19}	—	September 25, 2005	Calvin-Rehoboth	Calvin College	·	3.9 km	MPC · JPL
161596	2005 SK_{79}	—	September 24, 2005	Kitt Peak	Spacewatch	·	1.2 km	MPC · JPL
161597	2005 SR_{85}	—	September 24, 2005	Kitt Peak	Spacewatch	·	2.1 km	MPC · JPL
161598	2005 SF_{129}	—	September 29, 2005	Mount Lemmon	Mount Lemmon Survey	MRX	1.8 km	MPC · JPL
161599	2005 SB_{153}	—	September 25, 2005	Kitt Peak	Spacewatch	·	880 m	MPC · JPL
161600	2005 TE_{28}	—	October 1, 2005	Kitt Peak	Spacewatch	·	2.8 km	MPC · JPL

== 161601–161700 ==
back to top

Designation			Discovery			Properties		Ref
Permanent	Provisional	Named after	Date	Site	Discoverer(s)	Category	Diam.	Ref
161601	2005 TU_{75}	—	October 3, 2005	Catalina	CSS	·	3.2 km	MPC · JPL
161602	2005 TQ_{129}	—	October 7, 2005	Kitt Peak	Spacewatch	·	1.4 km	MPC · JPL
161603	2005 TY_{166}	—	October 9, 2005	Kitt Peak	Spacewatch	KOR	1.8 km	MPC · JPL
161604	2005 TU_{174}	—	October 1, 2005	Anderson Mesa	LONEOS	·	1.7 km	MPC · JPL
161605	2005 TR_{191}	—	October 1, 2005	Catalina	CSS	·	3.0 km	MPC · JPL
161606	2005 UR_{38}	—	October 24, 2005	Kitt Peak	Spacewatch	3:2	9.2 km	MPC · JPL
161607	2005 UW_{54}	—	October 23, 2005	Catalina	CSS	·	1.2 km	MPC · JPL
161608	2005 UZ_{68}	—	October 23, 2005	Catalina	CSS	EUP	7.8 km	MPC · JPL
161609	2005 UA_{83}	—	October 22, 2005	Kitt Peak	Spacewatch	JUN	1.5 km	MPC · JPL
161610	2005 UN_{88}	—	October 22, 2005	Kitt Peak	Spacewatch	THM	3.0 km	MPC · JPL
161611	2005 UR_{110}	—	October 22, 2005	Kitt Peak	Spacewatch	·	1.1 km	MPC · JPL
161612	2005 UQ_{127}	—	October 24, 2005	Kitt Peak	Spacewatch	NYS	1.9 km	MPC · JPL
161613	2005 UE_{274}	—	October 24, 2005	Palomar	NEAT	·	2.8 km	MPC · JPL
161614	2005 UG_{427}	—	October 28, 2005	Kitt Peak	Spacewatch	(5)	1.2 km	MPC · JPL
161615	2005 UQ_{440}	—	October 29, 2005	Catalina	CSS	·	1.3 km	MPC · JPL
161616	2005 UB_{497}	—	October 27, 2005	Palomar	NEAT	·	4.7 km	MPC · JPL
161617	2005 UJ_{513}	—	October 23, 2005	Catalina	CSS	EOS	2.7 km	MPC · JPL
161618	2005 VH_{117}	—	November 11, 2005	Kitt Peak	Spacewatch	MIS	3.6 km	MPC · JPL
161619	2005 VH_{120}	—	November 5, 2005	Kitt Peak	Spacewatch	·	1.7 km	MPC · JPL
161620	2005 WV_{57}	—	November 25, 2005	Catalina	CSS	·	2.7 km	MPC · JPL
161621	2005 WM_{92}	—	November 25, 2005	Mount Lemmon	Mount Lemmon Survey	·	3.6 km	MPC · JPL
161622	2005 WM_{115}	—	November 29, 2005	Mount Lemmon	Mount Lemmon Survey	AGN	1.6 km	MPC · JPL
161623	2005 WF_{158}	—	November 26, 2005	Mount Lemmon	Mount Lemmon Survey	·	3.1 km	MPC · JPL
161624	2005 WB_{202}	—	November 29, 2005	Kitt Peak	Spacewatch	·	2.8 km	MPC · JPL
161625 Susskind	2005 YJ_{7}	Susskind	December 22, 2005	Catalina	CSS	(1547)	2.8 km	MPC · JPL
161626	2005 YD_{8}	—	December 22, 2005	Kitt Peak	Spacewatch	·	2.8 km	MPC · JPL
161627	2005 YH_{8}	—	December 22, 2005	Kitt Peak	Spacewatch	(883)	1.3 km	MPC · JPL
161628	2005 YW_{29}	—	December 25, 2005	Kitt Peak	Spacewatch	KOR	2.3 km	MPC · JPL
161629	2005 YL_{47}	—	December 25, 2005	Catalina	CSS	·	1.5 km	MPC · JPL
161630	2005 YP_{93}	—	December 27, 2005	Catalina	CSS	H	890 m	MPC · JPL
161631	2005 YS_{130}	—	December 25, 2005	Kitt Peak	Spacewatch	·	1.5 km	MPC · JPL
161632	2005 YB_{244}	—	December 30, 2005	Kitt Peak	Spacewatch	NYS	1.5 km	MPC · JPL
161633	2005 YL_{247}	—	December 30, 2005	Mount Lemmon	Mount Lemmon Survey	·	1.9 km	MPC · JPL
161634	2005 YN_{277}	—	December 25, 2005	Kitt Peak	Spacewatch	·	1.3 km	MPC · JPL
161635	2005 YU_{290}	—	December 25, 2005	Mount Lemmon	Mount Lemmon Survey	THM	3.2 km	MPC · JPL
161636	2006 AR_{50}	—	January 5, 2006	Kitt Peak	Spacewatch	·	1.5 km	MPC · JPL
161637	2006 AM_{58}	—	January 8, 2006	Kitt Peak	Spacewatch	·	5.6 km	MPC · JPL
161638	2006 AA_{68}	—	January 5, 2006	Mount Lemmon	Mount Lemmon Survey	·	2.5 km	MPC · JPL
161639	2006 AS_{78}	—	January 4, 2006	Kitt Peak	Spacewatch	·	2.5 km	MPC · JPL
161640	2006 BJ_{5}	—	January 21, 2006	Mount Lemmon	Mount Lemmon Survey	·	1.0 km	MPC · JPL
161641	2006 BE_{11}	—	January 20, 2006	Kitt Peak	Spacewatch	NYS	2.0 km	MPC · JPL
161642	2006 BZ_{21}	—	January 22, 2006	Mount Lemmon	Mount Lemmon Survey	·	1.6 km	MPC · JPL
161643	2006 BS_{25}	—	January 23, 2006	Mount Lemmon	Mount Lemmon Survey	·	1.3 km	MPC · JPL
161644	2006 BC_{30}	—	January 20, 2006	Kitt Peak	Spacewatch	NYS	2.3 km	MPC · JPL
161645	2006 BO_{40}	—	January 21, 2006	Kitt Peak	Spacewatch	·	1.3 km	MPC · JPL
161646	2006 BL_{56}	—	January 21, 2006	Mount Lemmon	Mount Lemmon Survey	L5	9.8 km	MPC · JPL
161647	2006 BO_{69}	—	January 23, 2006	Kitt Peak	Spacewatch	·	2.3 km	MPC · JPL
161648	2006 BH_{87}	—	January 25, 2006	Kitt Peak	Spacewatch	PHO	3.0 km	MPC · JPL
161649	2006 BR_{95}	—	January 26, 2006	Kitt Peak	Spacewatch	·	1.4 km	MPC · JPL
161650	2006 BM_{97}	—	January 26, 2006	Mount Lemmon	Mount Lemmon Survey	·	2.0 km	MPC · JPL
161651	2006 BJ_{175}	—	January 27, 2006	Kitt Peak	Spacewatch	·	2.9 km	MPC · JPL
161652	2006 BC_{181}	—	January 27, 2006	Mount Lemmon	Mount Lemmon Survey	·	1.3 km	MPC · JPL
161653	2006 BB_{206}	—	January 31, 2006	Mount Lemmon	Mount Lemmon Survey	·	2.0 km	MPC · JPL
161654	2006 BE_{211}	—	January 31, 2006	Kitt Peak	Spacewatch	·	3.3 km	MPC · JPL
161655	2006 BZ_{234}	—	January 31, 2006	Kitt Peak	Spacewatch	·	4.5 km	MPC · JPL
161656	2006 BG_{251}	—	January 31, 2006	Kitt Peak	Spacewatch	MAS	1.1 km	MPC · JPL
161657	2006 BM_{268}	—	January 27, 2006	Catalina	CSS	·	2.6 km	MPC · JPL
161658	2006 BS_{269}	—	January 28, 2006	Anderson Mesa	LONEOS	·	2.0 km	MPC · JPL
161659	2006 CB_{23}	—	February 1, 2006	Kitt Peak	Spacewatch	·	2.3 km	MPC · JPL
161660	2006 CW_{34}	—	February 2, 2006	Mount Lemmon	Mount Lemmon Survey	·	1.3 km	MPC · JPL
161661 Bobbyclarke	2006 CN_{59}	Bobbyclarke	February 6, 2006	Mount Lemmon	Mount Lemmon Survey	MAS	1.3 km	MPC · JPL
161662	2006 CV_{59}	—	February 6, 2006	Mount Lemmon	Mount Lemmon Survey	·	1.7 km	MPC · JPL
161663	2006 DM_{3}	—	February 20, 2006	Catalina	CSS	NYS	1.8 km	MPC · JPL
161664	2006 DM_{16}	—	February 20, 2006	Kitt Peak	Spacewatch	L5	20 km	MPC · JPL
161665	2006 DS_{48}	—	February 21, 2006	Catalina	CSS	V	1.0 km	MPC · JPL
161666	2006 DN_{59}	—	February 24, 2006	Mount Lemmon	Mount Lemmon Survey	·	2.1 km	MPC · JPL
161667	2006 DD_{71}	—	February 21, 2006	Mount Lemmon	Mount Lemmon Survey	NYS	1.7 km	MPC · JPL
161668	2006 DS_{79}	—	February 24, 2006	Kitt Peak	Spacewatch	MAS	1.4 km	MPC · JPL
161669	2006 DL_{83}	—	February 24, 2006	Kitt Peak	Spacewatch	NYS	2.2 km	MPC · JPL
161670	2006 DP_{88}	—	February 24, 2006	Kitt Peak	Spacewatch	MAS	1.4 km	MPC · JPL
161671	2006 DT_{90}	—	February 24, 2006	Kitt Peak	Spacewatch	V	1.1 km	MPC · JPL
161672	2006 DB_{107}	—	February 25, 2006	Mount Lemmon	Mount Lemmon Survey	V	990 m	MPC · JPL
161673	2006 DH_{211}	—	February 24, 2006	Kitt Peak	Spacewatch	·	1.6 km	MPC · JPL
161674	2006 EM_{53}	—	March 2, 2006	Kitt Peak	Spacewatch	·	2.4 km	MPC · JPL
161675	2006 FU_{1}	—	March 22, 2006	Catalina	CSS	·	1.9 km	MPC · JPL
161676	2006 FQ_{4}	—	March 23, 2006	Kitt Peak	Spacewatch	·	5.2 km	MPC · JPL
161677	2006 FM_{13}	—	March 23, 2006	Kitt Peak	Spacewatch	·	1.5 km	MPC · JPL
161678	2006 FK_{17}	—	March 23, 2006	Mount Lemmon	Mount Lemmon Survey	slow	5.1 km	MPC · JPL
161679	2006 FY_{46}	—	March 23, 2006	Catalina	CSS	·	4.3 km	MPC · JPL
161680	2006 GD_{15}	—	April 2, 2006	Kitt Peak	Spacewatch	·	4.9 km	MPC · JPL
161681	2006 GK_{24}	—	April 2, 2006	Kitt Peak	Spacewatch	MAS	2.0 km	MPC · JPL
161682	2006 GP_{33}	—	April 7, 2006	Mount Lemmon	Mount Lemmon Survey	·	2.1 km	MPC · JPL
161683	2006 GY_{42}	—	April 12, 2006	Palomar	NEAT	·	3.7 km	MPC · JPL
161684	2006 GD_{50}	—	April 8, 2006	Siding Spring	SSS	·	2.4 km	MPC · JPL
161685	2006 GD_{52}	—	April 9, 2006	Catalina	CSS	·	3.4 km	MPC · JPL
161686	2006 HX_{16}	—	April 19, 2006	Anderson Mesa	LONEOS	·	6.4 km	MPC · JPL
161687	2006 HC_{17}	—	April 20, 2006	Kitt Peak	Spacewatch	·	2.0 km	MPC · JPL
161688	2006 HX_{24}	—	April 20, 2006	Kitt Peak	Spacewatch	EOS	3.6 km	MPC · JPL
161689	2006 HD_{30}	—	April 19, 2006	Catalina	CSS	JUN	2.1 km	MPC · JPL
161690	2006 HF_{32}	—	April 19, 2006	Kitt Peak	Spacewatch	·	3.1 km	MPC · JPL
161691	2006 HX_{41}	—	April 21, 2006	Kitt Peak	Spacewatch	BRA	2.6 km	MPC · JPL
161692	2006 HS_{44}	—	April 24, 2006	Mount Lemmon	Mount Lemmon Survey	·	4.2 km	MPC · JPL
161693 Attilladanko	2006 HL_{46}	Attilladanko	April 26, 2006	RAS	Lowe, A.	·	5.3 km	MPC · JPL
161694	2006 HV_{52}	—	April 19, 2006	Anderson Mesa	LONEOS	·	2.2 km	MPC · JPL
161695	2006 HL_{81}	—	April 26, 2006	Kitt Peak	Spacewatch	EOS	3.5 km	MPC · JPL
161696	2006 HR_{83}	—	April 26, 2006	Kitt Peak	Spacewatch	HOF	5.1 km	MPC · JPL
161697	2006 HZ_{104}	—	April 19, 2006	Catalina	CSS	·	2.9 km	MPC · JPL
161698	2006 HL_{120}	—	April 30, 2006	Kitt Peak	Spacewatch	THM	3.1 km	MPC · JPL
161699 Lisahardaway	2006 HR_{140}	Lisahardaway	April 26, 2006	Cerro Tololo	M. W. Buie	THM	3.8 km	MPC · JPL
161700	2006 JK_{32}	—	May 3, 2006	Kitt Peak	Spacewatch	LIX	6.2 km	MPC · JPL

== 161701–161800 ==
back to top

Designation			Discovery			Properties		Ref
Permanent	Provisional	Named after	Date	Site	Discoverer(s)	Category	Diam.	Ref
161701	2006 JW_{41}	—	May 7, 2006	Kitt Peak	Spacewatch	L4	15 km	MPC · JPL
161702	2006 JZ_{46}	—	May 5, 2006	Anderson Mesa	LONEOS	EOS	3.8 km	MPC · JPL
161703	2006 JH_{52}	—	May 5, 2006	Anderson Mesa	LONEOS	·	6.5 km	MPC · JPL
161704	2006 JL_{55}	—	May 1, 2006	Catalina	CSS	·	2.3 km	MPC · JPL
161705	2006 KJ	—	May 16, 2006	Palomar	NEAT	·	6.8 km	MPC · JPL
161706	2006 KG_{2}	—	May 17, 2006	Siding Spring	SSS	V	1.1 km	MPC · JPL
161707	2006 KY_{2}	—	May 18, 2006	Palomar	NEAT	(12739)	3.2 km	MPC · JPL
161708	2006 KX_{37}	—	May 24, 2006	Mount Lemmon	Mount Lemmon Survey	·	4.9 km	MPC · JPL
161709	2006 KJ_{48}	—	May 21, 2006	Kitt Peak	Spacewatch	·	1.8 km	MPC · JPL
161710	2006 KV_{75}	—	May 24, 2006	Palomar	NEAT	·	1.2 km	MPC · JPL
161711	2006 KU_{88}	—	May 26, 2006	Kitt Peak	Spacewatch	fast	6.5 km	MPC · JPL
161712	2006 KF_{91}	—	May 24, 2006	Mount Lemmon	Mount Lemmon Survey	WIT	1.5 km	MPC · JPL
161713	2006 KJ_{109}	—	May 31, 2006	Mount Lemmon	Mount Lemmon Survey	(13314)	2.9 km	MPC · JPL
161714	2006 MH	—	June 16, 2006	Kitt Peak	Spacewatch	·	7.0 km	MPC · JPL
161715 Wenchuan	2006 MZ_{12}	Wenchuan	June 23, 2006	Lulin Observatory	Q. Ye, Yang, T.-C.	·	2.0 km	MPC · JPL
161716	2006 OS_{15}	—	July 26, 2006	Siding Spring	SSS	H	1.1 km	MPC · JPL
161717	2006 PL_{23}	—	August 12, 2006	Palomar	NEAT	L4	19 km	MPC · JPL
161718	2006 QP_{28}	—	August 21, 2006	Kitt Peak	Spacewatch	·	3.2 km	MPC · JPL
161719	2006 QM_{123}	—	August 29, 2006	Catalina	CSS	·	3.8 km	MPC · JPL
161720	2006 QK_{126}	—	August 16, 2006	Palomar	NEAT	HOF	4.2 km	MPC · JPL
161721	2006 RF_{11}	—	September 12, 2006	Catalina	CSS	EUN	1.7 km	MPC · JPL
161722	2006 RH_{20}	—	September 15, 2006	Socorro	LINEAR	·	3.3 km	MPC · JPL
161723	2006 RT_{21}	—	September 15, 2006	Kitt Peak	Spacewatch	HYG	4.4 km	MPC · JPL
161724	2006 RB_{48}	—	September 14, 2006	Catalina	CSS	·	2.1 km	MPC · JPL
161725	2006 RK_{48}	—	September 14, 2006	Catalina	CSS	·	1.7 km	MPC · JPL
161726	2006 RB_{102}	—	September 15, 2006	Kitt Peak	Spacewatch	(12739)	2.8 km	MPC · JPL
161727	2006 SW_{7}	—	September 16, 2006	Socorro	LINEAR	·	1.3 km	MPC · JPL
161728	2006 SQ_{20}	—	September 18, 2006	Goodricke-Pigott	R. A. Tucker	·	5.8 km	MPC · JPL
161729	2006 SZ_{23}	—	September 18, 2006	Catalina	CSS	·	6.2 km	MPC · JPL
161730	2006 SE_{27}	—	September 16, 2006	Catalina	CSS	·	1.5 km	MPC · JPL
161731	2006 SG_{36}	—	September 17, 2006	Anderson Mesa	LONEOS	EOS	3.5 km	MPC · JPL
161732	2006 SV_{42}	—	September 18, 2006	Catalina	CSS	·	1.7 km	MPC · JPL
161733	2006 ST_{44}	—	September 17, 2006	Anderson Mesa	LONEOS	EUP	6.5 km	MPC · JPL
161734	2006 SP_{83}	—	September 18, 2006	Kitt Peak	Spacewatch	·	1.2 km	MPC · JPL
161735	2006 SC_{87}	—	September 18, 2006	Kitt Peak	Spacewatch	V	880 m	MPC · JPL
161736	2006 SA_{121}	—	September 18, 2006	Catalina	CSS	·	1.3 km	MPC · JPL
161737	2006 SR_{121}	—	September 18, 2006	Catalina	CSS	LIX	4.6 km	MPC · JPL
161738	2006 SD_{126}	—	September 20, 2006	Socorro	LINEAR	slow	4.4 km	MPC · JPL
161739	2006 SL_{126}	—	September 21, 2006	Anderson Mesa	LONEOS	·	1.4 km	MPC · JPL
161740	2006 SE_{154}	—	September 20, 2006	Palomar	NEAT	EOS	3.2 km	MPC · JPL
161741	2006 SU_{207}	—	September 25, 2006	Kitt Peak	Spacewatch	EOS	3.0 km	MPC · JPL
161742	2006 SV_{238}	—	September 26, 2006	Kitt Peak	Spacewatch	·	1.0 km	MPC · JPL
161743	2006 SR_{253}	—	September 26, 2006	Mount Lemmon	Mount Lemmon Survey	·	3.2 km	MPC · JPL
161744	2006 SK_{259}	—	September 26, 2006	Kitt Peak	Spacewatch	MAS	900 m	MPC · JPL
161745	2006 SV_{262}	—	September 26, 2006	Mount Lemmon	Mount Lemmon Survey	·	850 m	MPC · JPL
161746	2006 SF_{267}	—	September 26, 2006	Kitt Peak	Spacewatch	·	4.0 km	MPC · JPL
161747	2006 SY_{272}	—	September 27, 2006	Socorro	LINEAR	NYS	1.6 km	MPC · JPL
161748	2006 SR_{274}	—	September 27, 2006	Mount Lemmon	Mount Lemmon Survey	·	5.7 km	MPC · JPL
161749	2006 ST_{274}	—	September 27, 2006	Mount Lemmon	Mount Lemmon Survey	·	2.2 km	MPC · JPL
161750 Garyladd	2006 SQ_{285}	Garyladd	September 25, 2006	Mount Lemmon	Mount Lemmon Survey	·	2.1 km	MPC · JPL
161751	2006 SU_{287}	—	September 22, 2006	Catalina	CSS	·	4.4 km	MPC · JPL
161752	2006 SX_{289}	—	September 26, 2006	Siding Spring	SSS	H	1.1 km	MPC · JPL
161753	2006 SW_{327}	—	September 27, 2006	Kitt Peak	Spacewatch	·	4.8 km	MPC · JPL
161754	2006 SJ_{354}	—	September 30, 2006	Catalina	CSS	·	6.4 km	MPC · JPL
161755	2006 SQ_{354}	—	September 30, 2006	Mount Lemmon	Mount Lemmon Survey	·	1.1 km	MPC · JPL
161756	2006 SB_{360}	—	September 30, 2006	Catalina	CSS	·	2.9 km	MPC · JPL
161757	2006 TH	—	October 2, 2006	RAS	Lowe, A.	V	1.1 km	MPC · JPL
161758	2006 TL_{18}	—	October 11, 2006	Kitt Peak	Spacewatch	·	2.8 km	MPC · JPL
161759	2006 TO_{20}	—	October 11, 2006	Kitt Peak	Spacewatch	HNS	1.8 km	MPC · JPL
161760	2006 TU_{25}	—	October 12, 2006	Kitt Peak	Spacewatch	·	1.3 km	MPC · JPL
161761	2006 TK_{26}	—	October 12, 2006	Kitt Peak	Spacewatch	·	4.7 km	MPC · JPL
161762	2006 TQ_{29}	—	October 12, 2006	Kitt Peak	Spacewatch	EOS	3.2 km	MPC · JPL
161763	2006 TO_{30}	—	October 12, 2006	Kitt Peak	Spacewatch	·	1.9 km	MPC · JPL
161764	2006 TV_{49}	—	October 12, 2006	Palomar	NEAT	EOS	4.8 km	MPC · JPL
161765	2006 TH_{55}	—	October 12, 2006	Palomar	NEAT	·	5.7 km	MPC · JPL
161766	2006 TC_{56}	—	October 13, 2006	Kitt Peak	Spacewatch	·	5.0 km	MPC · JPL
161767	2006 TW_{62}	—	October 10, 2006	Palomar	NEAT	·	1.2 km	MPC · JPL
161768	2006 TA_{64}	—	October 10, 2006	Palomar	NEAT	·	3.6 km	MPC · JPL
161769	2006 TP_{67}	—	October 11, 2006	Kitt Peak	Spacewatch	·	1.6 km	MPC · JPL
161770	2006 TK_{73}	—	October 11, 2006	Palomar	NEAT	·	2.1 km	MPC · JPL
161771	2006 TY_{86}	—	October 13, 2006	Kitt Peak	Spacewatch	EOS	2.9 km	MPC · JPL
161772	2006 TG_{89}	—	October 13, 2006	Kitt Peak	Spacewatch	·	1.8 km	MPC · JPL
161773	2006 TG_{90}	—	October 13, 2006	Kitt Peak	Spacewatch	·	2.4 km	MPC · JPL
161774	2006 TU_{91}	—	October 13, 2006	Kitt Peak	Spacewatch	·	6.1 km	MPC · JPL
161775	2006 TG_{108}	—	October 1, 2006	Siding Spring	SSS	·	1.8 km	MPC · JPL
161776	2006 UJ_{7}	—	October 16, 2006	Catalina	CSS	EOS	2.8 km	MPC · JPL
161777	2006 UE_{11}	—	October 17, 2006	Mount Lemmon	Mount Lemmon Survey	CLA	2.1 km	MPC · JPL
161778	2006 US_{27}	—	October 16, 2006	Kitt Peak	Spacewatch	·	4.9 km	MPC · JPL
161779	2006 UN_{50}	—	October 17, 2006	Kitt Peak	Spacewatch	·	5.4 km	MPC · JPL
161780	2006 UQ_{70}	—	October 16, 2006	Catalina	CSS	·	1.8 km	MPC · JPL
161781	2006 UX_{108}	—	October 18, 2006	Kitt Peak	Spacewatch	·	6.4 km	MPC · JPL
161782	2006 UJ_{112}	—	October 19, 2006	Kitt Peak	Spacewatch	·	4.5 km	MPC · JPL
161783	2006 UB_{132}	—	October 19, 2006	Catalina	CSS	·	4.3 km	MPC · JPL
161784	2006 UZ_{138}	—	October 19, 2006	Kitt Peak	Spacewatch	JUN	1.9 km	MPC · JPL
161785	2006 UR_{179}	—	October 16, 2006	Catalina	CSS	·	4.9 km	MPC · JPL
161786	2006 UK_{189}	—	October 19, 2006	Catalina	CSS	·	5.8 km	MPC · JPL
161787	2006 UA_{192}	—	October 19, 2006	Catalina	CSS	·	4.5 km	MPC · JPL
161788	2006 UR_{208}	—	October 23, 2006	Kitt Peak	Spacewatch	·	5.7 km	MPC · JPL
161789	2006 UW_{255}	—	October 27, 2006	Mount Lemmon	Mount Lemmon Survey	·	3.2 km	MPC · JPL
161790	2006 UK_{261}	—	October 28, 2006	Kitt Peak	Spacewatch	THM	2.9 km	MPC · JPL
161791	2006 UM_{261}	—	October 28, 2006	Catalina	CSS	·	3.3 km	MPC · JPL
161792	2006 UO_{274}	—	October 28, 2006	Kitt Peak	Spacewatch	·	1.2 km	MPC · JPL
161793	2006 UT_{286}	—	October 28, 2006	Mount Lemmon	Mount Lemmon Survey	MAR	1.8 km	MPC · JPL
161794	2006 UE_{287}	—	October 28, 2006	Kitt Peak	Spacewatch	JUN	2.0 km	MPC · JPL
161795	2006 VJ_{29}	—	November 10, 2006	Kitt Peak	Spacewatch	·	980 m	MPC · JPL
161796	2006 VT_{34}	—	November 11, 2006	Catalina	CSS	·	1.3 km	MPC · JPL
161797	2006 VL_{45}	—	November 2, 2006	Catalina	CSS	MAR	2.2 km	MPC · JPL
161798	2006 VN_{48}	—	November 10, 2006	Socorro	LINEAR	·	3.6 km	MPC · JPL
161799	2006 VT_{51}	—	November 10, 2006	Kitt Peak	Spacewatch	·	2.0 km	MPC · JPL
161800	2006 VJ_{63}	—	November 11, 2006	Kitt Peak	Spacewatch	·	2.6 km	MPC · JPL

== 161801–161900 ==
back to top

Designation			Discovery			Properties		Ref
Permanent	Provisional	Named after	Date	Site	Discoverer(s)	Category	Diam.	Ref
161801	2006 VS_{64}	—	November 11, 2006	Kitt Peak	Spacewatch	·	3.5 km	MPC · JPL
161802	2006 VN_{75}	—	November 11, 2006	Kitt Peak	Spacewatch	·	1.2 km	MPC · JPL
161803	2006 VL_{85}	—	November 13, 2006	Kitt Peak	Spacewatch	·	4.4 km	MPC · JPL
161804	2006 VO_{87}	—	November 14, 2006	Catalina	CSS	·	1.4 km	MPC · JPL
161805	2006 VQ_{89}	—	November 14, 2006	Kitt Peak	Spacewatch	·	1.9 km	MPC · JPL
161806	2006 VZ_{92}	—	November 15, 2006	Mount Lemmon	Mount Lemmon Survey	·	1.5 km	MPC · JPL
161807	2006 VS_{96}	—	November 10, 2006	Kitt Peak	Spacewatch	MAS	1.0 km	MPC · JPL
161808	2006 VT_{119}	—	November 14, 2006	Kitt Peak	Spacewatch	AST	2.8 km	MPC · JPL
161809	2006 VM_{144}	—	November 15, 2006	Mount Lemmon	Mount Lemmon Survey	KOR	2.2 km	MPC · JPL
161810	2006 VO_{147}	—	November 15, 2006	Catalina	CSS	NYS	1.5 km	MPC · JPL
161811	2006 VL_{168}	—	November 14, 2006	Mount Lemmon	Mount Lemmon Survey	TIR	3.2 km	MPC · JPL
161812	2006 WV_{24}	—	November 17, 2006	Mount Lemmon	Mount Lemmon Survey	·	1.9 km	MPC · JPL
161813	2006 WW_{26}	—	November 18, 2006	Socorro	LINEAR	(6769)	2.3 km	MPC · JPL
161814	2006 WS_{27}	—	November 22, 2006	7300 Observatory	W. K. Y. Yeung	·	2.6 km	MPC · JPL
161815	2006 WK_{30}	—	November 24, 2006	Trois-Rivières	Trois-Rivieres	·	1.5 km	MPC · JPL
161816	2006 WB_{45}	—	November 16, 2006	Socorro	LINEAR	·	2.9 km	MPC · JPL
161817	2006 WL_{66}	—	November 17, 2006	Mount Lemmon	Mount Lemmon Survey	LIX	6.3 km	MPC · JPL
161818	2006 WB_{86}	—	November 18, 2006	Socorro	LINEAR	·	1.4 km	MPC · JPL
161819	2006 WS_{86}	—	November 18, 2006	Socorro	LINEAR	·	1.8 km	MPC · JPL
161820	2006 WG_{89}	—	November 18, 2006	Socorro	LINEAR	·	6.4 km	MPC · JPL
161821	2006 WP_{101}	—	November 19, 2006	Catalina	CSS	·	2.1 km	MPC · JPL
161822	2006 WO_{103}	—	November 19, 2006	Kitt Peak	Spacewatch	·	5.6 km	MPC · JPL
161823	2006 WG_{104}	—	November 19, 2006	Kitt Peak	Spacewatch	·	2.6 km	MPC · JPL
161824	2006 WN_{131}	—	November 17, 2006	Kitt Peak	Spacewatch	·	4.7 km	MPC · JPL
161825	2006 WE_{135}	—	November 18, 2006	Socorro	LINEAR	·	2.2 km	MPC · JPL
161826	2006 WX_{148}	—	November 20, 2006	Kitt Peak	Spacewatch	·	3.1 km	MPC · JPL
161827	2006 WX_{151}	—	November 21, 2006	Socorro	LINEAR	·	3.1 km	MPC · JPL
161828	2006 WF_{178}	—	November 23, 2006	Mount Lemmon	Mount Lemmon Survey	·	2.7 km	MPC · JPL
161829	2006 XQ_{8}	—	December 9, 2006	Palomar	NEAT	·	3.3 km	MPC · JPL
161830	2006 XZ_{25}	—	December 12, 2006	Catalina	CSS	HYG	4.2 km	MPC · JPL
161831	2006 XZ_{32}	—	December 10, 2006	Kitt Peak	Spacewatch	TIR	3.6 km	MPC · JPL
161832	2006 XV_{36}	—	December 11, 2006	Kitt Peak	Spacewatch	·	2.4 km	MPC · JPL
161833	2006 XC_{49}	—	December 13, 2006	Mount Lemmon	Mount Lemmon Survey	·	3.5 km	MPC · JPL
161834	2006 XU_{50}	—	December 13, 2006	Mount Lemmon	Mount Lemmon Survey	·	2.1 km	MPC · JPL
161835 Barbmcclintock	2006 XY_{50}	Barbmcclintock	December 13, 2006	Mount Lemmon	Mount Lemmon Survey	·	1.2 km	MPC · JPL
161836	2006 XX_{57}	—	December 14, 2006	Socorro	LINEAR	LIX	6.4 km	MPC · JPL
161837	2006 XZ_{63}	—	December 11, 2006	Catalina	CSS	·	2.7 km	MPC · JPL
161838	2006 XO_{66}	—	December 13, 2006	Mount Lemmon	Mount Lemmon Survey	(58892)	5.5 km	MPC · JPL
161839	2006 YB_{7}	—	December 20, 2006	Palomar	NEAT	·	2.6 km	MPC · JPL
161840	2006 YC_{16}	—	December 21, 2006	Kitt Peak	Spacewatch	·	3.2 km	MPC · JPL
161841	2006 YN_{18}	—	December 23, 2006	Mount Lemmon	Mount Lemmon Survey	EOS	2.8 km	MPC · JPL
161842	2007 AV_{7}	—	January 9, 2007	Kitt Peak	Spacewatch	AEG	6.5 km	MPC · JPL
161843	2007 AZ_{7}	—	January 9, 2007	Palomar	NEAT	·	3.9 km	MPC · JPL
161844	2007 AZ_{9}	—	January 8, 2007	Mount Lemmon	Mount Lemmon Survey	·	4.4 km	MPC · JPL
161845	2007 AK_{18}	—	January 9, 2007	Catalina	CSS	·	2.6 km	MPC · JPL
161846	2007 AG_{21}	—	January 10, 2007	Mount Lemmon	Mount Lemmon Survey	·	1.6 km	MPC · JPL
161847	2007 AP_{24}	—	January 15, 2007	Catalina	CSS	WIT	1.4 km	MPC · JPL
161848	2007 AZ_{25}	—	January 15, 2007	Anderson Mesa	LONEOS	·	2.7 km	MPC · JPL
161849	2007 AL_{27}	—	January 15, 2007	Catalina	CSS	·	3.6 km	MPC · JPL
161850	2007 BY_{7}	—	January 24, 2007	RAS	Lowe, A.	·	3.8 km	MPC · JPL
161851	2007 BQ_{8}	—	January 16, 2007	Catalina	CSS	(2076)	1.2 km	MPC · JPL
161852	2007 BP_{18}	—	January 17, 2007	Mount Lemmon	Mount Lemmon Survey	·	2.0 km	MPC · JPL
161853	2007 BR_{19}	—	January 23, 2007	Anderson Mesa	LONEOS	·	3.7 km	MPC · JPL
161854	2007 BQ_{29}	—	January 24, 2007	Socorro	LINEAR	·	3.1 km	MPC · JPL
161855	2007 BH_{30}	—	January 24, 2007	Catalina	CSS	MRX	1.4 km	MPC · JPL
161856	2007 BL_{40}	—	January 24, 2007	Mount Lemmon	Mount Lemmon Survey	THM	2.9 km	MPC · JPL
161857	2007 BU_{40}	—	January 24, 2007	Mount Lemmon	Mount Lemmon Survey	·	3.1 km	MPC · JPL
161858	2007 BD_{42}	—	January 24, 2007	Catalina	CSS	·	5.0 km	MPC · JPL
161859	2007 BN_{42}	—	January 24, 2007	Catalina	CSS	·	1.9 km	MPC · JPL
161860	2007 BP_{43}	—	January 24, 2007	Catalina	CSS	·	4.6 km	MPC · JPL
161861	2007 BX_{44}	—	January 25, 2007	Catalina	CSS	·	1.4 km	MPC · JPL
161862	2007 BJ_{49}	—	January 17, 2007	Kitt Peak	Spacewatch	BRA	1.7 km	MPC · JPL
161863	2007 BP_{50}	—	January 23, 2007	Socorro	LINEAR	·	4.9 km	MPC · JPL
161864	2007 BE_{53}	—	January 24, 2007	Kitt Peak	Spacewatch	PAD	2.5 km	MPC · JPL
161865	2007 BX_{59}	—	January 26, 2007	Anderson Mesa	LONEOS	EUN	2.2 km	MPC · JPL
161866	2007 BF_{70}	—	January 27, 2007	Mount Lemmon	Mount Lemmon Survey	·	4.7 km	MPC · JPL
161867	2007 CD	—	February 5, 2007	RAS	Lowe, A.	EUN	1.9 km	MPC · JPL
161868	2007 CQ	—	February 5, 2007	Palomar	NEAT	·	6.9 km	MPC · JPL
161869	2007 CW_{5}	—	February 8, 2007	RAS	Lowe, A.	·	4.8 km	MPC · JPL
161870	2007 CC_{7}	—	February 6, 2007	Kitt Peak	Spacewatch	EOS	2.6 km	MPC · JPL
161871	2007 CE_{12}	—	February 6, 2007	Kitt Peak	Spacewatch	·	1.4 km	MPC · JPL
161872	2007 CM_{13}	—	February 7, 2007	Mount Lemmon	Mount Lemmon Survey	·	3.7 km	MPC · JPL
161873	2007 CG_{15}	—	February 7, 2007	Catalina	CSS	EUP	6.7 km	MPC · JPL
161874	2007 CS_{22}	—	February 6, 2007	Palomar	NEAT	·	4.2 km	MPC · JPL
161875	2007 CK_{25}	—	February 8, 2007	Kitt Peak	Spacewatch	·	2.3 km	MPC · JPL
161876	2007 CW_{28}	—	February 6, 2007	Palomar	NEAT	EMA	4.8 km	MPC · JPL
161877	2007 CR_{34}	—	February 6, 2007	Palomar	NEAT	·	3.4 km	MPC · JPL
161878	2007 CL_{36}	—	February 6, 2007	Mount Lemmon	Mount Lemmon Survey	·	1.3 km	MPC · JPL
161879	2007 CT_{40}	—	February 7, 2007	Kitt Peak	Spacewatch	·	1.1 km	MPC · JPL
161880	2007 CP_{44}	—	February 8, 2007	Palomar	NEAT	·	1.7 km	MPC · JPL
161881	2007 CS_{45}	—	February 8, 2007	Palomar	NEAT	·	2.7 km	MPC · JPL
161882	2007 CM_{46}	—	February 8, 2007	Mount Lemmon	Mount Lemmon Survey	·	2.9 km	MPC · JPL
161883	2007 CU_{46}	—	February 8, 2007	Palomar	NEAT	·	1.1 km	MPC · JPL
161884	2007 CD_{54}	—	February 10, 2007	Catalina	CSS	TEL	2.3 km	MPC · JPL
161885	2007 CF_{56}	—	February 15, 2007	Catalina	CSS	·	1.9 km	MPC · JPL
161886	2007 CO_{58}	—	February 10, 2007	Palomar	NEAT	·	2.3 km	MPC · JPL
161887	2007 CG_{59}	—	February 10, 2007	Catalina	CSS	·	2.9 km	MPC · JPL
161888	2007 CP_{62}	—	February 13, 2007	Socorro	LINEAR	HNS	2.3 km	MPC · JPL
161889	2007 DP_{3}	—	February 16, 2007	Mount Lemmon	Mount Lemmon Survey	·	2.3 km	MPC · JPL
161890	2007 DT_{3}	—	February 16, 2007	Mount Lemmon	Mount Lemmon Survey	(5)	1.4 km	MPC · JPL
161891	2007 DW_{10}	—	February 17, 2007	Kitt Peak	Spacewatch	·	3.4 km	MPC · JPL
161892	2007 DK_{19}	—	February 17, 2007	Kitt Peak	Spacewatch	(5)	1.4 km	MPC · JPL
161893	2007 DJ_{23}	—	February 17, 2007	Kitt Peak	Spacewatch	·	2.3 km	MPC · JPL
161894	2007 DZ_{29}	—	February 17, 2007	Kitt Peak	Spacewatch	·	1.6 km	MPC · JPL
161895	2007 DV_{30}	—	February 17, 2007	Kitt Peak	Spacewatch	·	2.9 km	MPC · JPL
161896	2007 DE_{34}	—	February 17, 2007	Kitt Peak	Spacewatch	(12739)	2.1 km	MPC · JPL
161897	2007 DQ_{41}	—	February 21, 2007	Mount Lemmon	Mount Lemmon Survey	·	1.6 km	MPC · JPL
161898	2007 DS_{44}	—	February 17, 2007	Palomar	NEAT	·	1.8 km	MPC · JPL
161899	2007 DZ_{44}	—	February 19, 2007	Mount Lemmon	Mount Lemmon Survey	·	1.0 km	MPC · JPL
161900	2007 DF_{47}	—	February 21, 2007	Mount Lemmon	Mount Lemmon Survey	MAS	850 m	MPC · JPL

== 161901–162000 ==
back to top

Designation			Discovery			Properties		Ref
Permanent	Provisional	Named after	Date	Site	Discoverer(s)	Category	Diam.	Ref
161901	2007 DD_{51}	—	February 17, 2007	Socorro	LINEAR	PHO	1.8 km	MPC · JPL
161902	2007 DG_{52}	—	February 17, 2007	Mount Lemmon	Mount Lemmon Survey	·	5.6 km	MPC · JPL
161903	2007 DK_{54}	—	February 21, 2007	Kitt Peak	Spacewatch	·	2.0 km	MPC · JPL
161904	2007 DU_{54}	—	February 21, 2007	Kitt Peak	Spacewatch	·	2.2 km	MPC · JPL
161905	2007 DN_{59}	—	February 22, 2007	Kitt Peak	Spacewatch	·	1.9 km	MPC · JPL
161906	2007 DW_{59}	—	February 22, 2007	Anderson Mesa	LONEOS	·	1.1 km	MPC · JPL
161907	2007 DL_{60}	—	February 21, 2007	Socorro	LINEAR	·	1.4 km	MPC · JPL
161908	2007 DD_{79}	—	February 23, 2007	Kitt Peak	Spacewatch	·	2.3 km	MPC · JPL
161909	2007 DO_{82}	—	February 23, 2007	Catalina	CSS	·	1.8 km	MPC · JPL
161910	2007 DE_{86}	—	February 21, 2007	Kitt Peak	Spacewatch	·	4.4 km	MPC · JPL
161911	2007 DV_{91}	—	February 23, 2007	Mount Lemmon	Mount Lemmon Survey	THM	4.2 km	MPC · JPL
161912	2007 DY_{97}	—	February 23, 2007	Kitt Peak	Spacewatch	NYS	1.7 km	MPC · JPL
161913 Hunyadi	2007 EA	Hunyadi	March 5, 2007	Piszkéstető	K. Sárneczky	·	880 m	MPC · JPL
161914	2007 EE_{9}	—	March 9, 2007	Mount Lemmon	Mount Lemmon Survey	NYS	1.2 km	MPC · JPL
161915	2007 EY_{24}	—	March 10, 2007	Mount Lemmon	Mount Lemmon Survey	·	3.5 km	MPC · JPL
161916	2007 EO_{34}	—	March 10, 2007	Palomar	NEAT	L5	13 km	MPC · JPL
161917	2007 EK_{36}	—	March 11, 2007	Catalina	CSS	·	2.8 km	MPC · JPL
161918	2007 EY_{37}	—	March 11, 2007	Mount Lemmon	Mount Lemmon Survey	V	830 m	MPC · JPL
161919	2007 EH_{48}	—	March 9, 2007	Kitt Peak	Spacewatch	KOR	2.2 km	MPC · JPL
161920	2007 EP_{51}	—	March 10, 2007	Mount Lemmon	Mount Lemmon Survey	·	900 m	MPC · JPL
161921	2007 EX_{56}	—	March 14, 2007	RAS	Lowe, A.	·	2.0 km	MPC · JPL
161922	2007 EA_{57}	—	March 14, 2007	RAS	Lowe, A.	·	5.8 km	MPC · JPL
161923	2007 EP_{86}	—	March 13, 2007	Mount Lemmon	Mount Lemmon Survey	MAS	880 m	MPC · JPL
161924	2007 EZ_{86}	—	March 13, 2007	Catalina	CSS	·	5.7 km	MPC · JPL
161925	2007 EM_{101}	—	March 11, 2007	Kitt Peak	Spacewatch	·	5.5 km	MPC · JPL
161926	2007 EX_{108}	—	March 11, 2007	Kitt Peak	Spacewatch	·	1.2 km	MPC · JPL
161927	2007 EU_{119}	—	March 13, 2007	Mount Lemmon	Mount Lemmon Survey	·	4.3 km	MPC · JPL
161928	2007 EB_{133}	—	March 9, 2007	Mount Lemmon	Mount Lemmon Survey	·	2.3 km	MPC · JPL
161929	2007 ET_{133}	—	March 9, 2007	Mount Lemmon	Mount Lemmon Survey	·	2.1 km	MPC · JPL
161930	2007 EG_{161}	—	March 14, 2007	Siding Spring	SSS	·	5.6 km	MPC · JPL
161931	2007 EK_{171}	—	March 11, 2007	Catalina	CSS	TIR	5.1 km	MPC · JPL
161932	2007 EU_{172}	—	March 14, 2007	Kitt Peak	Spacewatch	·	1.8 km	MPC · JPL
161933	2007 EB_{181}	—	March 14, 2007	Kitt Peak	Spacewatch	·	940 m	MPC · JPL
161934	2007 EJ_{185}	—	March 14, 2007	Mount Lemmon	Mount Lemmon Survey	·	2.2 km	MPC · JPL
161935	2007 EN_{199}	—	March 10, 2007	Mount Lemmon	Mount Lemmon Survey	MAS	960 m	MPC · JPL
161936	2007 FX_{23}	—	March 20, 2007	Kitt Peak	Spacewatch	·	2.8 km	MPC · JPL
161937	2007 FC_{34}	—	March 25, 2007	Mount Lemmon	Mount Lemmon Survey	NYS	1.1 km	MPC · JPL
161938	2007 FB_{37}	—	March 26, 2007	Kitt Peak	Spacewatch	·	5.3 km	MPC · JPL
161939	2007 FT_{38}	—	March 25, 2007	Catalina	CSS	THB	3.8 km	MPC · JPL
161940	2007 FU_{38}	—	March 26, 2007	Mount Lemmon	Mount Lemmon Survey	EUN	2.4 km	MPC · JPL
161941	2007 FT_{43}	—	March 18, 2007	Kitt Peak	Spacewatch	·	1.1 km	MPC · JPL
161942	2007 GS_{1}	—	April 10, 2007	RAS	Lowe, A.	EUN	2.3 km	MPC · JPL
161943	2007 GF_{18}	—	April 11, 2007	Catalina	CSS	·	5.2 km	MPC · JPL
161944	2007 GM_{20}	—	April 11, 2007	Mount Lemmon	Mount Lemmon Survey	·	2.6 km	MPC · JPL
161945	2007 GP_{21}	—	April 11, 2007	Mount Lemmon	Mount Lemmon Survey	NYS	1.4 km	MPC · JPL
161946	2007 GX_{23}	—	April 11, 2007	Kitt Peak	Spacewatch	·	2.6 km	MPC · JPL
161947	2007 GD_{25}	—	April 12, 2007	Siding Spring	SSS	·	6.3 km	MPC · JPL
161948	2007 GU_{29}	—	April 13, 2007	Siding Spring	SSS	·	4.0 km	MPC · JPL
161949	2007 GF_{30}	—	April 14, 2007	Kitt Peak	Spacewatch	·	4.0 km	MPC · JPL
161950	2007 GJ_{41}	—	April 14, 2007	Kitt Peak	Spacewatch	·	1.4 km	MPC · JPL
161951	2007 GX_{47}	—	April 14, 2007	Kitt Peak	Spacewatch	·	3.0 km	MPC · JPL
161952	2007 GA_{60}	—	April 15, 2007	Kitt Peak	Spacewatch	·	5.0 km	MPC · JPL
161953	2007 HD_{17}	—	April 16, 2007	Catalina	CSS	·	2.0 km	MPC · JPL
161954	2007 HB_{18}	—	April 16, 2007	Catalina	CSS	·	1.5 km	MPC · JPL
161955	2007 HZ_{26}	—	April 18, 2007	Kitt Peak	Spacewatch	·	1.4 km	MPC · JPL
161956	2007 HG_{39}	—	April 20, 2007	Kitt Peak	Spacewatch	·	2.0 km	MPC · JPL
161957	2007 HR_{41}	—	April 20, 2007	Mount Lemmon	Mount Lemmon Survey	·	9.5 km	MPC · JPL
161958	2007 HV_{46}	—	April 20, 2007	Kitt Peak	Spacewatch	TIR	3.3 km	MPC · JPL
161959	2007 HH_{48}	—	April 20, 2007	Kitt Peak	Spacewatch	MAS	1.2 km	MPC · JPL
161960	2007 HA_{64}	—	April 22, 2007	Mount Lemmon	Mount Lemmon Survey	·	1.6 km	MPC · JPL
161961	2007 HO_{65}	—	April 22, 2007	Catalina	CSS	·	6.3 km	MPC · JPL
161962 Galchyn	2007 HE_{84}	Galchyn	April 27, 2007	Andrushivka	Andrushivka	·	3.9 km	MPC · JPL
161963	2007 HU_{85}	—	April 24, 2007	Kitt Peak	Spacewatch	·	4.2 km	MPC · JPL
161964	2007 HV_{85}	—	April 24, 2007	Kitt Peak	Spacewatch	JUN	1.0 km	MPC · JPL
161965	2007 HX_{87}	—	April 26, 2007	Kitt Peak	Spacewatch	EUN	2.1 km	MPC · JPL
161966	2007 JP_{3}	—	May 6, 2007	Kitt Peak	Spacewatch	·	7.5 km	MPC · JPL
161967	2007 JE_{28}	—	May 10, 2007	Kitt Peak	Spacewatch	(1298)	4.9 km	MPC · JPL
161968	2007 JQ_{32}	—	May 12, 2007	Kitt Peak	Spacewatch	·	3.1 km	MPC · JPL
161969	2007 JS_{32}	—	May 12, 2007	Kitt Peak	Spacewatch	·	2.5 km	MPC · JPL
161970	2007 JW_{34}	—	May 10, 2007	Kitt Peak	Spacewatch	(5)	2.8 km	MPC · JPL
161971	2007 JN_{38}	—	May 12, 2007	Mount Lemmon	Mount Lemmon Survey	·	1.5 km	MPC · JPL
161972	2007 JJ_{40}	—	May 10, 2007	Mount Lemmon	Mount Lemmon Survey	·	1.1 km	MPC · JPL
161973	2007 KJ_{5}	—	May 24, 2007	Mount Lemmon	Mount Lemmon Survey	·	2.8 km	MPC · JPL
161974	2007 KP_{7}	—	May 16, 2007	Siding Spring	SSS	·	2.9 km	MPC · JPL
161975 Kincsem	2007 LO	Kincsem	June 8, 2007	Piszkéstető	K. Sárneczky	·	4.3 km	MPC · JPL
161976	2007 LY_{1}	—	June 7, 2007	Kitt Peak	Spacewatch	·	4.4 km	MPC · JPL
161977	2007 LE_{3}	—	June 8, 2007	Catalina	CSS	fast	2.0 km	MPC · JPL
161978	2007 LU_{16}	—	June 10, 2007	Kitt Peak	Spacewatch	·	1.8 km	MPC · JPL
161979	2007 MU_{24}	—	June 23, 2007	Kitt Peak	Spacewatch	·	2.0 km	MPC · JPL
161980	2007 OR_{3}	—	July 18, 2007	Chante-Perdrix	Chante-Perdrix	NYS	2.2 km	MPC · JPL
161981	4745 P-L	—	September 24, 1960	Palomar	C. J. van Houten, I. van Houten-Groeneveld, T. Gehrels	·	1.9 km	MPC · JPL
161982	6159 P-L	—	September 24, 1960	Palomar	C. J. van Houten, I. van Houten-Groeneveld, T. Gehrels	·	1.7 km	MPC · JPL
161983	6236 P-L	—	September 24, 1960	Palomar	C. J. van Houten, I. van Houten-Groeneveld, T. Gehrels	·	5.4 km	MPC · JPL
161984	6515 P-L	—	September 24, 1960	Palomar	C. J. van Houten, I. van Houten-Groeneveld, T. Gehrels	·	6.4 km	MPC · JPL
161985	1253 T-2	—	September 29, 1973	Palomar	C. J. van Houten, I. van Houten-Groeneveld, T. Gehrels	·	1.3 km	MPC · JPL
161986	3418 T-2	—	September 30, 1973	Palomar	C. J. van Houten, I. van Houten-Groeneveld, T. Gehrels	·	2.3 km	MPC · JPL
161987	2026 T-3	—	October 16, 1977	Palomar	C. J. van Houten, I. van Houten-Groeneveld, T. Gehrels	·	2.1 km	MPC · JPL
161988	4069 T-3	—	October 16, 1977	Palomar	C. J. van Houten, I. van Houten-Groeneveld, T. Gehrels	·	1.7 km	MPC · JPL
161989 Cacus	1978 CA	Cacus	February 8, 1978	La Silla	H.-E. Schuster	APO +1km · PHA	1.9 km	MPC · JPL
161990	1981 EY_{29}	—	March 2, 1981	Siding Spring	S. J. Bus	·	2.0 km	MPC · JPL
161991	1981 EU_{36}	—	March 7, 1981	Siding Spring	S. J. Bus	·	1.2 km	MPC · JPL
161992	1981 EK_{38}	—	March 1, 1981	Siding Spring	S. J. Bus	·	1.4 km	MPC · JPL
161993	1981 EG_{45}	—	March 1, 1981	Siding Spring	S. J. Bus	·	1.8 km	MPC · JPL
161994	1981 EK_{48}	—	March 7, 1981	Siding Spring	S. J. Bus	·	3.4 km	MPC · JPL
161995	1983 LB	—	June 13, 1983	Palomar	Swanson, S. R., E. F. Helin	AMO +1km	1.2 km	MPC · JPL
161996	1985 RH_{3}	—	September 6, 1985	La Silla	H. Debehogne	·	3.8 km	MPC · JPL
161997	1987 AN	—	January 1, 1987	La Silla	Norgaard-Nielsen, H. U.	·	1.7 km	MPC · JPL
161998	1988 PA	—	August 9, 1988	Palomar	J. Alu	AMO +1km	1.1 km	MPC · JPL
161999	1989 RC	—	September 5, 1989	Palomar	J. Alu, E. F. Helin	AMO	460 m	MPC · JPL
162000	1990 OS	—	July 21, 1990	Palomar	E. F. Helin	APO · PHA · moon	400 m	MPC · JPL

back to top

== See also ==
- Meanings of minor-planet names: 161001–162000
