= Acraman =

Acraman may refer to:

== Places ==
- Acraman crater, an impact crater in South Australia
  - Lake Acraman, a lake at the centre of the Acraman crater
- Acraman Creek, a stream in the west of South Australia
  - Acraman Creek Conservation Park, a protected area in the west of South Australia

== People with the surname ==
- John Acraman (1829–1907),
- Rodney Acraman, Fiji Islander
