= Gostin =

Gostin may refer to:

- 3640 Gostin, a main-belt asteroid, named after Victor Gostin
- Larry Gostin, an American law professor
- Victor Gostin (born 1940), an Australian geologist
- the former German name of the Silesian town Gostyń, now in Silesian Voivodeship, Poland
