= Adelaide Glaciarium =

Historic ice skating rink in Adelaide, South Australia

Coordinates: 34°55′24″S 138°35′46″E

- Ice Palace Skating Rink
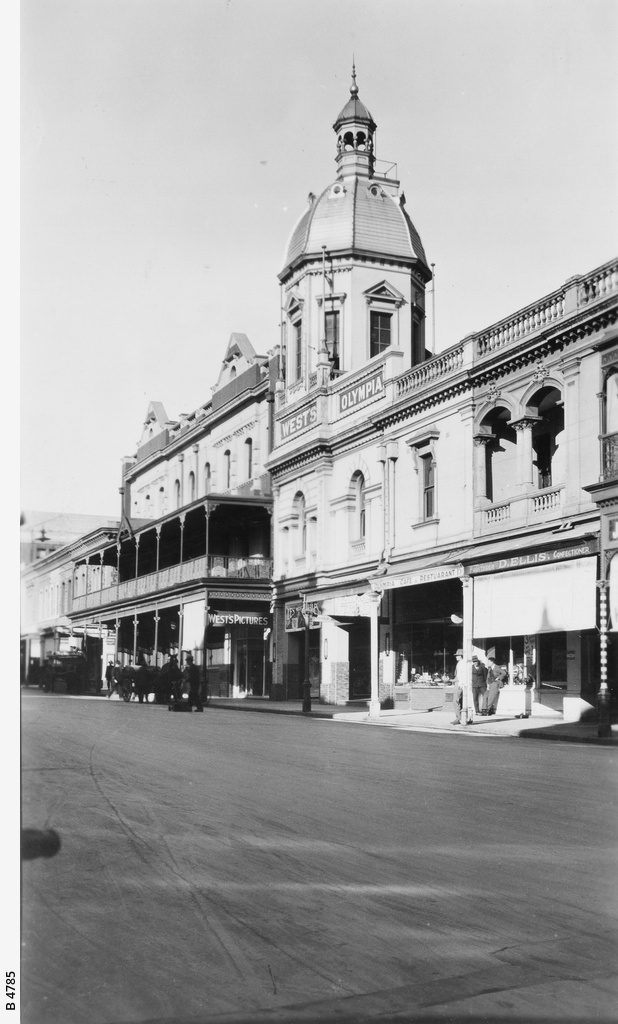
- The entrance tower as seen in 1928 from Hindley Street Adelaide SA. State Library of South Australia B 4785
- Interactive map of Adelaide Glaciarium
- Location: 91 Hindley Street, Adelaide, 5000
- Capacity: 580
- Surface: 35.05 metres (115 ft) × 25.6 metres (84 ft)

Construction
- Opened: 6 September 1904

The Adelaide Glaciarium (also known as Ice Palace Skating Rink), located at 89–91 Hindley Street in the city of Adelaide, South Australia, was the first indoor ice-skating facility built in Australia. It is also the location of the first "hockey on the ice" match in the country, which was an adaptation of roller polo for the ice using ice skates. Contemporary ice hockey was never played at this venue but this ice skating rink, the country's first, provided the "test bed" facility for its successor, the Melbourne Glaciarium, the birthplace of ice hockey in Australia.

In 1907 it became the Olympia Roller Skating Rink, and in December 1908 it was converted into a picture theatre, West's Olympia, by cinema chain owner T. J. West. This was the first permanent cinema in Adelaide, in 1939 replaced by a new building West's Theatre.

== History ==
The Cyclorama buildings were built on Town Acre 74 in Adelaide, South Australia. This town acre was originally purchased by English born John Barton Hack, who was an early settler in Adelaide, at the beginning of the first land sales in Adelaide in March 1837 as part of a 60-acre lot purchase. On the eastern half of the Town Acre 74 property the proprietor, Mr. William McLean, built the Grand Coffee Palace in 1890. Immediately to the west of the Grand Coffee Palace, he erected the Cyclorama Entrance tower and vestibule on the western half of Town Acre 74 in the same year and the tower entrance and vestibule wall adjoined the Grand Coffee Palace walls. The adjoining wall of the octagonal-walled viewing gallery encroached on the boundary of the half acre the Grand Coffee Palace was built on by enough to see the property boundary line 2 inches inside the adjoining wall of the viewing room. The eaves of the dome surpassed the boundary by 30 inches. The eastern walls of the tower and vestibule were supported by the west walls of the Grand Coffee Palace building. This was later not found to be an issue after a Civil Court case due to Mr. William McLean having been the owner of both town acres at the time the buildings were erected.

The architects for the Cyclorama buildings were English & Soward, a business that started in 1880 consisting of Adelaide (Norwood)-born George Klewitz Soward and England born Australian migrant Thomas English. The cost of the project was £5000.

=== Cyclorama ===
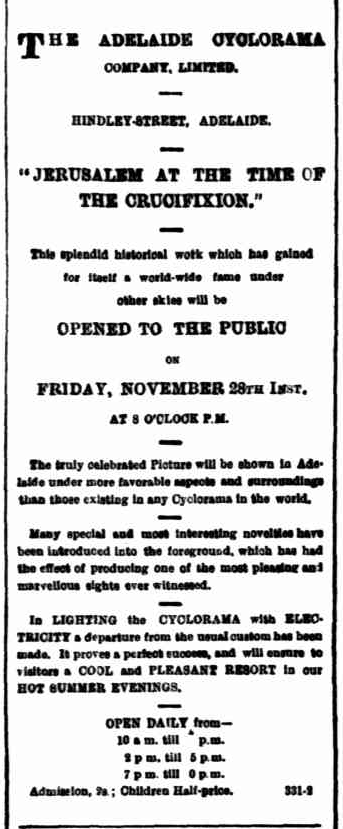
28 November 1890 advertisement announcing the opening night of the Adelaide Cyclorama National Library of Australia

The original buildings were located at 89 Hindley Street, Adelaide and opened to the public as a cyclorama at 8:00pm on Friday 28 November 1890. The building was also referred to as the Trocadero even though it was more widely known as the Cyclorama.

==== Architecture and specifications ====
The Cyclorama consisted of a street-facing two-storey Victorian terrace building with high Victorian dome, a long vestibule connecting the street facing tower to the main building, and the main building at the rear which housed the Cyclorama in a "battle axe" style property.

Tower Entrance – This was a 14-foot double-storey Victorian terrace with high Victorian dome that faced Hindley Street. Patrons would enter the Cyclorama through the large wrought iron gate entry in the domed tower. The tower rose to the height of 75 feet (23 m) and the dome itself was 10 feet (just over 3 metres) in diameter. The room under the dome was used for patrons as a viewing gallery where a camera obscura displayed a reflection of the surrounding country on the inside wall. The room on top of the terrace was an octagonal construction.

Vestibule – This long entrance hallway was a 95 feet (29 m) long and 14 feet (4.3 m) wide passage that connected the tower entrance building on Hindley Street and ran south to the large Cyclorama building at the rear of the property. It contained 2 arched recesses on the wall adjoining the Grand Coffee Palace which was a 'party wall'. The floor of the vestibule was asphalt and the hallway was well lit with electrical lighting. There were waiting rooms for ladies and gentlemen lining the hallway.

Main building – The building itself was of brick construction and was 130 by 115 feet (40 by 35 m) with large walls 47 feet (14 m) high The building itself was 130 by 115 feet (40 by 35 m) and 47 feet (14 m) in height and the plan was an ice floor surface of 155 by 84 feet (47 by 26 m) was possible after an orchestra stand, platform and seating for 580 guests inside. and only a single point of entry via a long vestibule. The roof was a single span timber construction and was half covered in glass panels, to let natural light in during the day, and half iron sheet. The building had incandescent lighting for the evening viewing sessions The interior of the building originally had an elevated platform at its center with spiral stairs winding around it to give access to the top viewing platform, from where visitors would view the cycloramas being exhibited. In December 1898, two additional stages were added and the famous canvas painting of the Battle of Waterloo during extensive alteration work.

==== Pricing and viewing times ====
The Cyclorama was open daily at the following times:

- 10:00am to 5:00pm
- 7:00pm to 10:00pm

Lectures were held at the following times:

- 11:30am
- 3:00pm
- 8:00pm

General Admission prices were:

- Adults – 9 Shillings
- Children 1 Shilling

==== The exhibitions ====
The first exhibit the Adelaide Cyclorama Company Ltd showed at the Cyclorama was a picture of Jerusalem called Jerusalem at the Time of the Crucifixion.

This image of Jerusalem was the subject of an allegation of copyright infringement by Fishburn Bros. of South Shields England, assignees of a German firm. The action began on Wednesday 9 March 1892 when it was brought before the Fall Court of Judges, seeking an injunction that restrained the Adelaide Cyclorama Group from using the picture and in the alternative claim be awarded £10,000 in damages. The claim was that the Jerusalem exhibition in the Adelaide Cyclorama was a copy of the panoramic painting by Bruno Piglhein depicting the crucifixion of Jesus Christ.

==== The Trocadero fire ====
On Saturday 11 March 1899 at approximately 2:40am the Adelaide Cyclorama was found to be on fire by Police Constable John Sweeny who was on duty patrolling Currie Street East and noticed a fire coming from the Cyclorama building. He ran down to Hindley Street where he saw that the fire had taken good hold of the building and immediately told another on duty officer Constable Deacon to get the fire brigade to the building, who received this call at 2:44am. Passing by on his bicycle was Detective Jones, who rode to the fire alarm located on Hindley Streetand smashed the glass to sound it. The fire reportedly had a strong hold on the building though the account was made that it was remarkable that the flames did not reach greater height considering the interior was inflammable, likely due to the lack of wind that morning. Following instructing Constable Deacon to summon the fire brigade, Constable John Sweeny ran to Rosina Street and Solomon Street to wake people and alert them to the fire. He then headed back to the Cyclorama where he met Caretaker Mr. Hugentobler and Mrs. G. Gould at the gate entry as the partially dressed pair were exiting the Cyclorama building, unaware of the building being on fire and only coming out to see what the commotion was about – only being aroused by Constable John Sweeny's loud call of "Fire!". The fire finally burned out at 4:00am and the Trocodero was a smoldering ruin.

The manager of the Adelaide branch of the Commercial Bank, Edward Jones, said the Cyclorama building was insured for £2,000, the engine and electric light plant was insured for £125. The panoramas inside the building were the picture of Waterloo that was insured for £500 and the picture of the Crimea War which was insured for £300. Both panoramas were lost to the fire that completely destroyed the building.

== Glaciarium ==
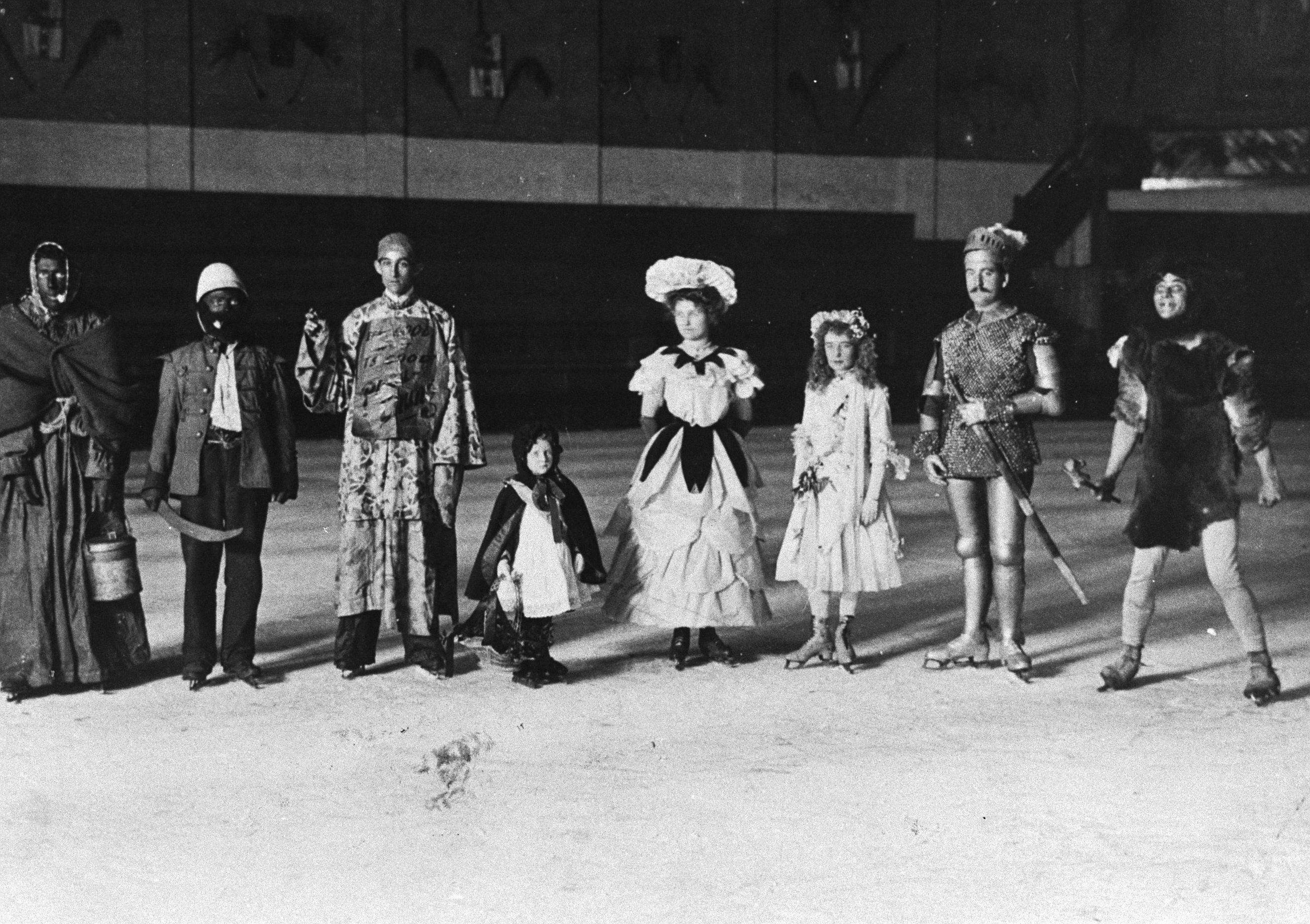
1905 – Skaters in fancy dress at the Glaciarium. State Library of South Australia B 62204

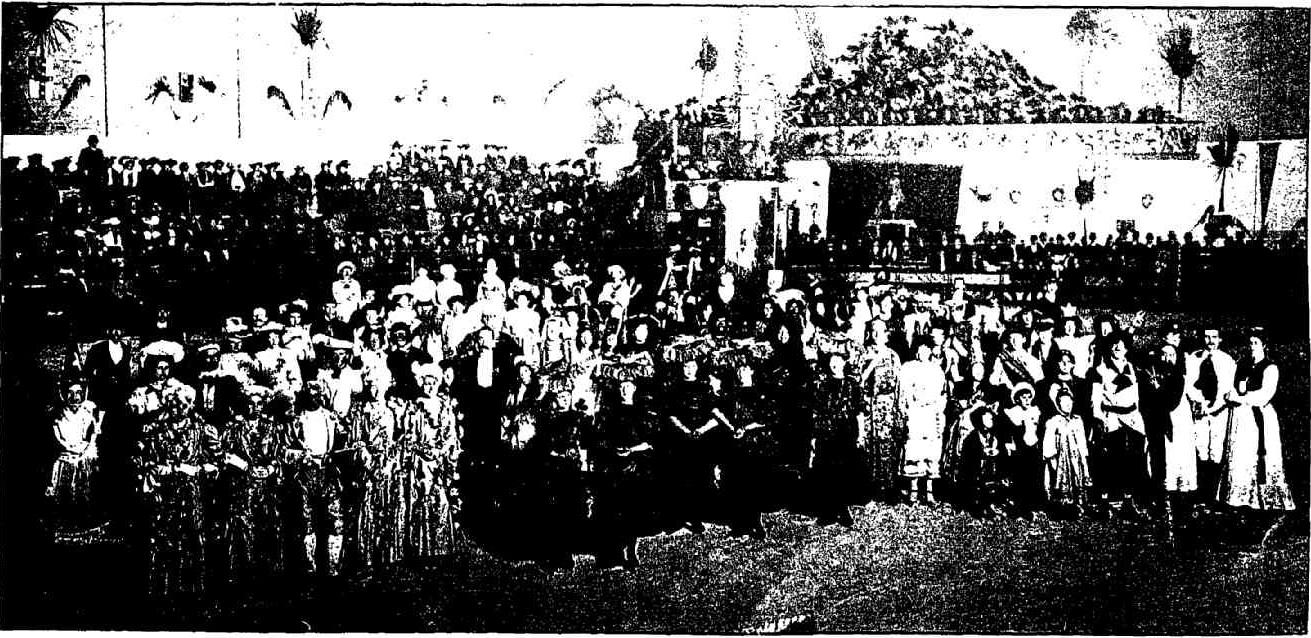
Taken at the Carnival 2 August 1905. National Library of Australia

Skaters on the ice during a carnival in the Glaciarium, May 1906. National Library of Australia

On Wednesday 1 June 1904 the prospectus for the acquisition of the Cyclorama building on 89 Hindley Street, Adelaide was issued. The following day in an interview, H. Newman Reid discussed the dimensions of the building, internal layout, seating capacity and ice surface dimensions and how the present Cyclorama building is well adapted for the purposes of the proposed Glaciariam project.

The building itself was 130 by 115 feet (40 by 35 m) and 47 feet (14 m) in height and the plan was an ice floor surface of 155 by 84 feet (47 by 26 m) was possible after an orchestra stand, platform and seating for 580 guests inside.

The remodelled Cyclorama building opened as the Glaciarium on the evening of Tuesday 6 September 1904.

A common newspaper to find regular advertisements for events was The Advertiser. Advertisements would always be under the "Amusements" section, as would game and event reports. The "Amusements" section was shared with the Theatre Royal, art exhibitions, and the roller skating rink, who had very similar events to the Glaciarium, such as fancy dress carnivals. The regularly-played hockey on the ice matches were never placed in the "Sports" section of this newspaper.

After closing down for the summer season, the Glaciarium re opened on 2 March 1905, featuring a skating exhibition by Professor Brewer.

The 1905 ice skating season closed down for the summer on 14 October 1905.

=== Pricing and session times ===
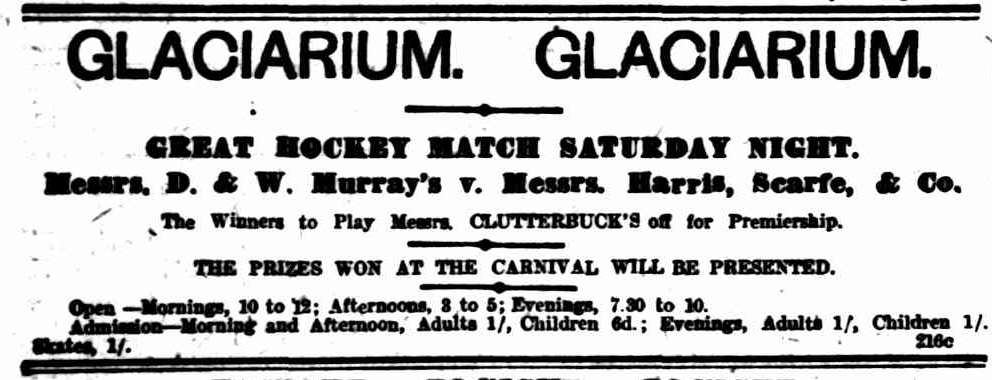
Advertisement for hockey on the ice, 4 August 1905. National Library of Australia

There were 3 sessions available during the day:

- Morning Session 10:00am to 12:00noon
- Afternoon Session 3:00pm to 5:00pm
- Evening Session 7:30pm to 10:00pm

Pricing for sessions depended on time of day:

- Morning Session: Adults 1 shilling, Children 6 pence
- Afternoon Session: Adults 1 Shilling, Children 6 pence
- Evening Session: Adults 1 Shilling, Children 1 Shilling

Ice skate hire was available:

- Skates: 1 shilling

=== Types of events held ===
Among the skating sessions there was a variety of events held at the Glaciarium. On 21 July 1905, basketball on ice was tried for the first time in front of the laughter of a crowd.

==== Carnivals ====
Fancy Dress carnivals were held often and attracted many people, awards were held for a variety of categories such as Best Costume, Most Original Costume, Best Poster Costume, Most Sustained Character and Most Grotesque Costume.

==== Skating ====
Very regularly, exhibitions of various forms of skating were held by Professor James Brewer, such as fast skating, international skating and fancy skating.

Sporting events were held at the carnivals in the following categories:

- Quarter-mile Hurdle Race
- Half-mile Scratch Race

=== Hockey on the ice ===
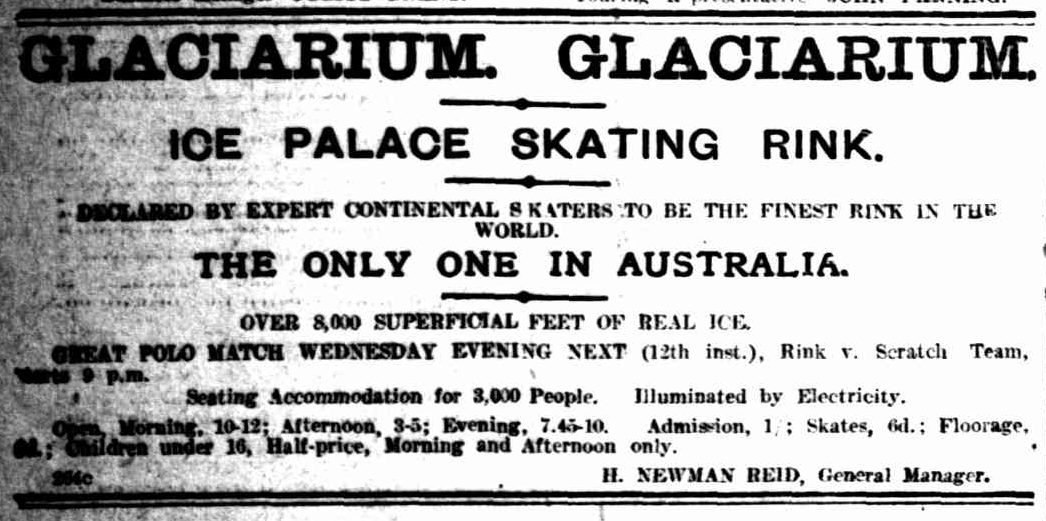
10 October 1904 ad referring to the "hockey match" as being polo. National Library of Australia

Hockey on the ice, in the early 1900s in Adelaide was the popular sport of roller polo adapted to an ice surface and using ice skates, also known elsewhere around the world as "ice polo". Each team had 6 players. In the 10 October 1904 edition of The Advertiser, the first match to be played at the month old Adelaide Glaciarium was advertised for the first time as a polo match. The following day, it was advertised as a hockey match and the term continued to be used from that point onward.

==== The first game ====
The first match for this adapted form of roller polo, hockey on the ice, was played during a carnival in the Glaciarium at 9:00pm on 12 October 1904. A match was organised between a Rink team and a Scratch team, picked from the visitors to the rink. It was described by a reporter as being like football on ice skates. The match itself was part of a range of sports and carnival activities for the evening where those attending were dressed in costume and fancy dress.

The game was played in 4 quarters and Dr. Harrold scored 2 goals for the Scratch Team in the first quarter. In the last quarter the Rink team scored 2 goals to tie up the game and the game ended in a 2–2 draw.

The Teams were as follows:

Rink

- Watts
- Langley
- Bates
- Barnett
- Professor Caldwell (captain)

Scratch Team

- Rev. A. N. Garrett
- Dr. R. E. Harrold
- Rhoeder
- F. Gate
- J. Gow (captain)

==== Early matches ====
Hockey on the ice is a term used for the stick and ball game played on an ice surface and the use of the phrase can be traced back to at least 1853 to describe a game played at Windsor Castle in England. The earliest known record of a Bandy club in England is from 1813 by the name of Bury Fen Bandy Club, who were responsible for the creation of the majority of the rules when bandy was later codified in 1882. The rules of bandy have many similarities to the rules in the sport of football (soccer). Before bandy was codified, ice hockey first had its rules published on 27 February 1877 in the Montreal newspaper, The Gazette. It was likened to field hockey and even continued to use the word ball within the set of rules. Ice hockey would spread across Canada and the northern part of the United States of America but bandy would spread across Northern European countries. What was being called hockey on the ice in the Adelaide Glaciarium was played while skating on the ice and hitting a sphere with a hooked roller polo stick, while on ice skates. The score for each team involved a tally of both goals and points and was an adaptation of the already popular activity of roller polo, on ice.

The first hockey on the ice match between employees representing local businesses was on 15 May 1905. The match was between G. & R. Wills & Co. and D. & W. Murray, Limited which was assembled from a group of novices.

==== Early hockey on the ice match dates and results ====
Rink vs Scratch/Adelaide Team Hockey on the Ice Games
Date	Team 1	Goals	Points	Team 2	Goals	Points
12 October 1904	Rink	2	0	Scratch Team	2	0
15 October 1904	Rink	N/A	N/A	Scratch Team	N/A	N/A
22 March 1905	Rink	N/A	N/A	Adelaide Team	N/A	N/A
29 March 1905	Rink	N/A	N/A	Adelaide Team	N/A	N/A
5 April 1905	Rink	1	N/A	Adelaide Team	1	N/A
17 April 1905	Rink	N/A	N/A	Adelaide Team	N/A	N/A
28 April 1905	North Adelaide Team	1	0	South Adelaide Team	2	0
1 May 1905	North Adelaide Team	N/A	N/A	South Adelaide Team	N/A	N/A
15 May 1905	G. & R Wills & Co.	N/A	N/A	D. & W. Murray, Limited	N/A	N/A

==== Warehouseman's Association ====
On Wednesday 24 May 1905, the first match of the series of matches held under the auspices Warehouseman's Association was played between a team representing G. & R. Wills & Co. and a team representing James Marshall & Co. This game was played in front of 800 people. The first announcement of this Association was on 19 May 1905. The teams playing under the endorsement Warehouseman's Association were groups of men (Messrs.) who were employees of the following local companies: The Warehouseman's Association began with 6 teams being affiliated with the association, each team consisting of 6 players.

- G. & R. Wills & Co.
- James Marshall & Company
- Harris Scarfe
- Clutterbuck Brothers
- D&W Murray
- Goode, Durrant & Co.

On Wednesday 5 July 1905, teams representing Australia and England played a Hockey on the Ice match at the Adelaide Glaciarium. The players on each team were as follows:

Australia – Parker, Clutterbuck, Hosking, Nightingale, Butler, Part
England – Swanson, Barker, Poole, Knight, Watts, Osendale

In the evening of 5 August 1905, the teams D&W Murray's would play a match of hockey on the ice against team Harris, Scarfe & Co as part of the Warehouseman's Hockey Association. The winning team of the match would play the Clutterbucks for the premiership and gold medal. Professor James Brewer, billed as "The World's Greatest Skater", would appear on the same night in the fancy skating. Each of the 6 members of the winning team would receive a gold medal.

The results of the Premiership match, held 12 August 1905, saw Harris, Scarfe & Co win by a goal.

==== Warehouseman's Association hockey on the ice dates and results ====
Warehouseman's Association Hockey on the Ice Games in 1905
Date	Team 1	Goals	Points	Team 2	Goals	Points	
24 May 1905	G. & R. Wills & Co.	2	5	James Marshall & Co.	1	3	
26 May 1905	D. & W. Murray, Limited	2	4	Goode, Durrant & Co.	0	1	
2 June 1905	D. & W. Murray, Limited	7	1	James Marshall & Co.	1	3	
9 June 1905	Clutterbuck Brothers	2	3	G. & R. Wills & Co.	2	0	
12 June 1905	Harris, Scarfe & Co.	3	1	Goode, Durrant & Co.	2	1	
19 June 1905	D. & W. Murray, Limited	4	1	Harris, Scarfe & Co.	0	1	
23 June 1905	Goode, Durrant & Co.	1	3	G. & R. Wills	1	2	
26 June 1905	D. & W. Murray, Limited			Clutterbuck Brothers			
30 June 1905	James Marshall & Co.	1	1	Good, Durrant & Co.	1	1	
3 July 1905	G. & R. Wills & Co.	0	0	Harris, Scarfe & Co.	4	0	
10 July 1905	G. & R. Wills & Co.			D. & W. Murray, Limited			
24 July 1905	Harris, Scarfe & Co.	2	0	Clutterbuck Brothers	1	0	
28 July 1905	Goode, Durrant, & Co.	2	0	D. & W. Murrays, Limited	2	3	
5 August 1905	Harris, Scarfe & Co.	4	1	D. & W. Murray, Limited	1	3	
12 August 1905	Harris, Scarfe & Co.	1	0	Clutterbuck Brothers	0	0	Premiership gold medal game
26 August 1905	Harris, Scarfe, & Co.	2	2	Association Team	1	0	Exhibition Challenge

Exhibition Hockey on the Ice Games in 1905
Date	Team 1	Goals	Points	Team 2	Goals	Points
3 June 1905	St. Peters College	2	0	Prince Alfred College	2	0
10 June 1905	St. Peters College	7	1	Prince Alfred College	0	2
17 June 1905	Rink	N/A	N/A	Officers of the S.M.S. Panther	N/A	N/A
1 July 1905	Prince Alfred College	1	0	Muirden College	1	3
5 July 1905	Australia	4	2	England	3	1
8 July 1905	Red & White Team	2	3	Blue & White Team	1	1
15 July 1905	Professor Brewer's Team	1	1	Professor Caldwell's Team	3	1
22 July 1905	Prince Alfred College	0	1	St. Peters College	5	2
19 August 1905	Professor Brewer's Team	1	0	Professor Caldwell's Team	2	0
1 September 1905	Professor Brewer's Team	4	0	Professor Caldwell's Team	5	0

Warehouseman's Association Hockey on the Ice Games in 1906
Date	Team 1	Goals	Points	Team 2	Goals	Points
19 May 1905	Caldwell	0	1	Brewer	1	0
31 May 1906	Clutterbuck Brothers	4		Harris, Scarfe & Co.	0	
12 July 1906	Elder, Smith & Co.	1		D. & W. Murray, Limited	2	

== Subsequent uses of the building ==
=== Olympia roller skating rink ===
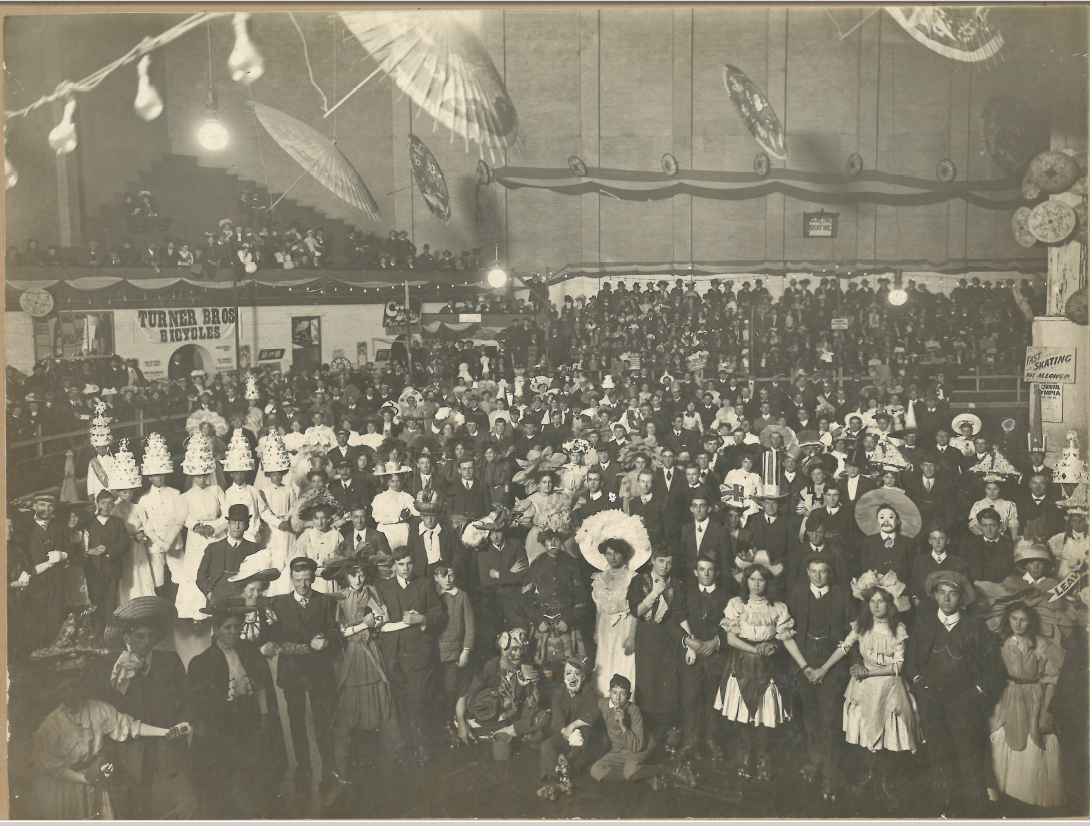
Costumed roller skaters at the Carnival (1908)

On 14 December 1907, the former Glaciarium was reopened after renovations saw the ice surface replaced with a rock asphalt surface for roller skating, and the building was renamed the Olympia Roller Skating Rink.

=== West's Pictures ===
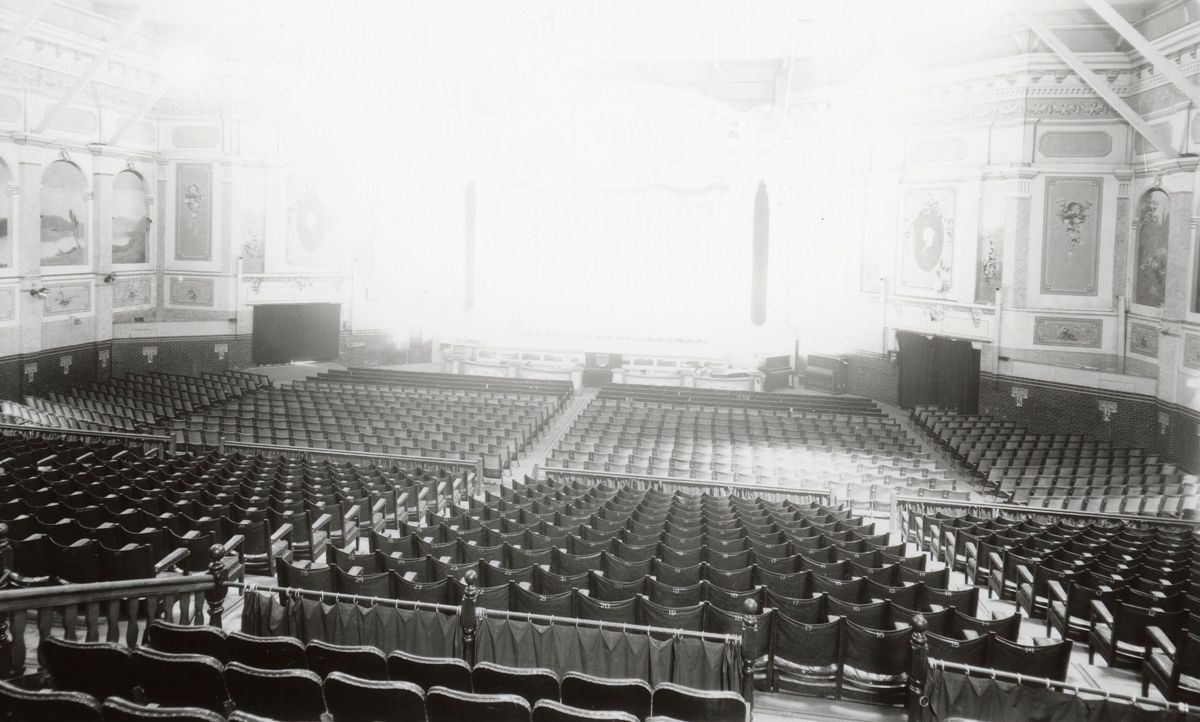
Interior of West's Olympia (1936)

After 91 Hindley Street was purchased by T.J. West (who acquired a chain of cinemas in the era of silent films, known as West's Pictures), West's Olympia was opened as Adelaide's first permanent picture theatre on Saturday 5 December 1908.

West's Olympia retained the original buildings from the cyclorama, but underwent renovations where seating accommodation was increased. It had raked seating with a capacity of 3,000 patrons. The first films on opening night included scenic films of Lake Como and the Georges of Tarn as well as a dramatic piece including the Nick Carter detective series.

After demolition of the earlier picture theatre in 1938, a new cinema with an Art Deco design and nothing but the stage retained was constructed. South Australian silky oak was the timber used throughout the building, and the long carpeted foyer was under a dome that held a large chandelier and concealed rotating coloured lighting. The capacity of the theatre was 1,447 people. West's Theatre opened on 1 December 1939, with the feature Pygmalion. "Senora West" was the only woman projectionist in the world at the time.

West's Theatre closed on 28 February 1977 and the last movie played was Snow White and the Seven Dwarves.

=== Jade Palace Restaurant ===
In May 1978 the building reopened as a Jade Palace Chinese restaurant but quickly failed and went into liquidation by December that same year.

=== Sinatras ===
In June 1979 the building opened as a popular disco nightclub called Sinatras, lined with mirrored tiles, disco balls and plush red velvet lounges and indoor plants.

=== Greater Union Cinemas ===
In October 1980 the building was re-purchased by Greater Union Cinemas. The building was damaged by fire due to arson in November 1981.

On 10 December 1982 the building reopened as Hindley Cinemas 5 & 6. Cinema 5 was a 768-seat theatre that opened with the popular movie E.T. the Extra-Terrestrial, Cinema 6 was a 488-seat theatre that opened with the film The Year of Living Dangerously.

Cinema 6 was the first to close on 6 April 1991, with The Godfather being the last film it showed. Cinema 5 was closed 5 days later and the last feature shown was Edward Scissorhands.

=== Meridian Time Zone ===
In 1994 the building opened as the Meridian Time Zone amusement centre. The property was sold in 1999 and closed down in May 2001.

=== Grainger Studio ===
The building was refurbished and opened on 26 October 2001, to become the home to the Grainger Studio of the Adelaide Symphony Orchestra, named after composer Percy Grainger.

== Exhibition ==
The cinema was featured in a photographic exhibition called Now Showing... Cinema Architecture in South Australia, held at the Hawke Centre's Kerry Packer Civic Gallery in April/May 2024.

== See also ==
- List of ice rinks in Australia
