= John Acraman =

Australian businessman (1829-1907)

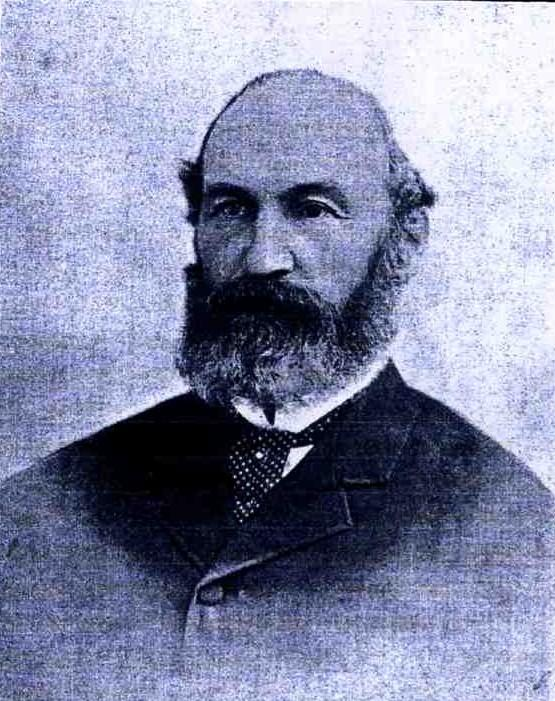
- Born: 1829; England
- Died: 22 June 1907 (aged 78); North Adelaide, South Australia
- Father: William Edward Acraman

John Acraman (1829 – 22 June 1907) was a prominent businessman in the colony of South Australia, and he has a place in the history of Australian football in that state.

== History ==
John Acraman was born in England, a son of William Edward Acraman (c. 1800 – 27 November 1875) and Mary Acraman (c. 1801 – 9 February 1871) of Sidmouth, Devon, England. Theirs was an old and honorable Somersetshire family, whose surname was formerly spelled Akerman, or Ackerman. John's grandfather Daniel Wade Acraman, a Bristol businessman, was a noted connoisseur of art.

John Acraman's early days were spent at Bath, Somerset and Clifton, Bristol, and he was educated in both places. His father was a wealthy merchant and industrialist, owner of several East India ships. At Bristol he was nominally apprenticed to his father, in order that he might qualify for membership of the prestigious Society of Merchant Venturers.

His eldest brother Edward Daniel Acraman (c. 1825 – 20 January 1848) emigrated to Adelaide aboard Kingston, arriving in January 1846, and formed a partnership with James Cooke. Urged by his brother to join him, John sailed from Bristol aboard Appleton consigned to Acraman, Cooke, & Co., arriving at Semaphore in April 1848. He carried letters of introduction to Mr. Justice Cooper, John Morphett and Samuel Davenport, (all of whom were subsequently knighted) given him by Charles Sturt, who had returned to England in 1847 by that same Appleton.

John walked to Port Adelaide, where he met Captain Scott from whom he received news of the recent death of his brother. He immediately made his way to the house of his uncle Edward Castle, of "Hackham" at Morphett Vale, and there met among others (afterwards Justice) Edward Castres Gwynne and Edward Klingender. He opened an office in Flinders Street and took on James Cooke as partner in Acraman, Cooke & Co. For months he boarded with R. E. Tapley in Gilbert Street, then moved to the more convenient Clarendon Hotel in Hindley Street. He was next in a boarding house kept by Robert Hall, Adelaide's first daguerrotypist. Among his fellow-boarders were G. W. Hawkes, Erasmus Gower and George Green, the auctioneer.

In 1851 he visited India, but while in Calcutta heard news of the Victorian gold finds, and returned to Adelaide. The firm was able to capitalize on the increased demand, and made huge profits despite the shortage of staff, most able-bodied men having joined the rush. The firm opened a temporary branch in Melbourne, managed by James Cooke, and an office in Bendigo under Archibald Cooke. They purchased River Murray steamboats, which while the Murray was in flood proved the most efficient way of servicing the goldfields, and bullock teams and wagons, though not without risk: one bullock driver sold the dray, team and load, and was never seen again. A shipment of gold was lost when the Madagascar vanished without trace in 1853.

Acraman and Randolph Isham Stow in 1853 decided to start housekeeping together, and purchased a house adjoining the Green Dragon Brewery on South Terrace from Alfred Watts, with an agreement that whichever of them married first should have the option of taking over the house and furniture. This proved to be Acraman, who married Sydney Sarah Knox on 17 October 1854 at Christ Church, North Adelaide. She had been a passenger on the Grecian, which was wrecked off Port Adelaide in 1850. The couple spent twelve months in the United Kingdom, and their second son, Harold Arthur, was born in Portrush, County Antrim.

Acraman and Cooke dissolved their partnership in December 1854, and in 1855 Acraman joined George Main (11 December 1823 – 6 January 1905) and John Lindsay, as Acraman, Main, and Lindsay. The company had diverse interests, from coastal and River Murray shipping (their steamers were the Culgoa, Kennedy, Sturt and Leichardt) and insurance to pastoral management, having runs in the Gawler Ranges and the west of the colony. In 1869 Lindsay partially removed from most of the company's activities with the formation of a second company Acraman, Main, & Co., but Acraman, Main, Lindsay, & Co. continued to trade until around 1870. From 1875 they acted as agents for T. B. Hall & Sons, of England, distributors of Guinness Stout. In April 1882 Acraman & Main became Acraman, Son & Co. when he took his son John Knox Acraman into partnership.

== Other business interests ==
It is speculated that he owned the ship Thomas Brown.

Acraman represented the Royal Insurance Company in South Australia from around 1851 to 1891.

For over 30 years he was Chairman of the South Australian Gas Company.

He was a director of the Adelaide and Suburban Tramway Company, the Glenelg Railway Company, and other businesses.

He was a member of the Marine Board.

In the 1860s, he and George Main took up Yardea and Moonaree stations in the Gawler Ranges, and Gum Flat on the west coast. Later they acquired the Wilpena leases on the glowing commendation of McDouall Stuart. Around 1876, Moonaree was sold to W. A. Horn, and then Messrs. Sells, Grant, and Stokes joined the original owners, and formed the combination, afterward known as Main, Sells, & Co., Ltd., one of the largest pastoral firms in South Australia. Acraman was a director of the company until the leases expired, and Main, Sells, & Co. retired from pastoral occupation.

== Other interests ==
John Acraman was a sportsman - while a student at Clifton, he played senior cricket for Mortimer House School, which was kept by Dr. John E. Bromby, later Canon Bromby, headmaster of Melbourne Grammar School.

He had a significant role in the introduction of Australian football into South Australia: he, William Fullarton and Robert Cussen, met with Henry Harrison and Tom Wills, imported the first five (round) balls, and when the original Adelaide Football Club was founded, erected the goalposts and captained one of its two sides (J. B. Spence led the other). He served as the club's president, then as the number of clubs grew, transferred to the North Adelaide side and served as a Vice-President.

He was a Vice-President of the South Australian Cricketing Association, the South Australian Rowing Association, and the South Australian Lacrosse Association. He was a regular attendant at cricket and football matches on the Adelaide Oval, and followed the play closely.

He was on the Board of Governors of St. Peter's College from 1873 to 1894.

He inherited his father's taste for art, and was entrusted with the purchase in Europe of valuable works.

He was one of the oldest members of the Adelaide Club.

== Recognition ==
Lake Acraman and Acraman Creek were named for him, and the Acraman crater takes its name from Lake Acraman, which forms the central feature of the meteorite impact structure.

He has been dubbed the "Father of South Australian Football" for his role in introducing the (Victorian) game to the colony, and was in 2002 inducted into the SA Football Hall of Fame.

== Family ==
John Acraman (c. 1829 – 22 June 1907) married Sydney Sarah Knox (c. 1835 – 23 October 1902) on 17 October 1854. Their children were:

- John Knox Acraman (1855 – 2 August 1912) was a valued player for the Adelaide Football Club
- Mary Adelaide Acraman (17 February 1857 – 30 October 1932)
- Harold Arthur Acraman (6 July 1858 – 28 February 1902) married Rose Evelyn Middleton ( – ) on 7 October 1897, business partner of Albert Ernest Middleton. Auctioneer at Burrowa, New South Wales bankrupt shortly before his death, which followed a fall during a hurdle race. He was reckoned by A. B. "Banjo" Paterson as perhaps the best amateur rider of his day.
- Morley Alexander Acraman (17 March 1860 – 1 May 1934) a fine footballer, was a solicitor at Norseman, struck off the list for improper use of money held in trust.
- Sydney Julia Acraman (1 January 1862 – 3 April 1920) married Richard de la Poer Beresford (1856–1917) on 15 June 1887. He was a solicitor of Mount Barker, South Australia then Fremantle, Western Australia.

- (Eileen) May de la Poer Beresford ( – 1978) married Harold Rischbieth MD FRCS (c. 1875–1943), a son of Charles Rischbieth.
- Claude Richard Beresford aka Claude Richard de la Poer Beresford (9 March 1888 – 19 September 1945) was an Adelaide journalist

- Alfred George Acraman (26 January 1865 – 7 September 1946) married Emilie Mary Cunningham ( – 22 April 1950) on 4 July 1905. She was the widow of Alexander Cunningham.
- William Edward Acraman (19 August 1867 – 11 April 1923) married Matilda Huxley "Tillie" Hunter ( – ) on 20 June 1900. Chaff merchant with Frederic Acraman and Herbert Gerald Tolmer as Tolmer and Acraman, dissolved March 1905
- Guy Stanley Acraman (15 August 1869 – 27 July 1927) with Union Bank of Australia at Victor Harbor then Geelong, committee Onkaparinga Racing Club, yachtsman associated with Arthur Graham Rymill (1886–1966) and E. S. Rymill and their yacht Nyroca.
- Frederic Acraman (21 September 1871 – ) married Flora Eunice Tolmer ( – 25 August 1948) on 30 November 1904. She was a daughter of Alexander H. D. Tolmer (1839 – 30 October 1928) and granddaughter of Alexander Tolmer.
- Edith Ierne Acraman (19 September 1873 – 8 January 1936) was a painter, a member of the Society of Arts
- Laura Joanna Acraman (21 April 1876 – 8 March 1885)
- Gerald Acraman (29 December 1878 – 24 April 1901) was a notable cricketer: he made the first three centuries compiled at Menzies, Western Australia, the last, 158, being made only the day before he contracted typhoid fever, from which he died.

Edward Daniel Acraman (c. 1825–1848), who arrived in SA in January 1846 on the Kingston was John's eldest brother.

Their home "The Grove" at Walkerville was destroyed by fire in October 1876, and they lived for a time at George Hawker's mansion "The Briers" They lived at "Agivey", Molesworth Street, North Adelaide, from sometime before 1904, and it was there he died. The property was sold to Frank Irwin in 1908.

William Acraman (c. 1834–1900), who arrived in SA April 1845 on the Isabella Watson, and Thomas Edward Acraman (c. 1827–1889), who arrived in SA in June 1849 on the Jenny Jones, may have been distantly related.
