= 3640 Gostin =

Main-belt asteroid

Discovery
- Discovered by: C. Shoemaker; E. Shoemaker
- Discovery site: Palomar Obs.
- Discovery date: 11 October 1985

Designations
- Named after: Victor Gostin (Australian geologist)
- Alternative designations: 1985 TR_{3} · 1955 SS; 1960 CB · 1970 CS; 1972 VJ_{1}
- Minor planet category: main-belt · (inner); Flora

Orbital characteristics
- Epoch 23 March 2018 (JD 2458200.5)
- Uncertainty parameter 0
- Observation arc: 61.63 yr (22,511 d)
- Aphelion: 2.4175 AU
- Perihelion: 2.0311 AU
- Semi-major axis: 2.2243 AU
- Eccentricity: 0.0869
- Orbital period (sidereal): 3.32 yr (1,212 d)
- Mean anomaly: 224.62°
- Mean motion: 0° 17^{m} 49.56^{s} / day
- Inclination: 4.3118°
- Longitude of ascending node: 289.19°
- Argument of perihelion: 155.59°

Physical characteristics
- Mean diameter: 7.148±0.088 km 7.613±0.096 km 8.58 km (calculated)
- Synodic rotation period: 3.26±0.05 h 3.263±0.0009 h 3.263±0.003 h 3.2641±0.0005 h
- Geometric albedo: 0.2127±0.0446; 0.239±0.036; 0.24 (assumed)
- Spectral type: SMASS = S
- Absolute magnitude (H): 12.26±0.14 (R); 12.398±0.001 (R); 12.5; 12.62±0.20; 12.9

3640 Gostin, provisional designation 1985 TR_{3}, is a stony Florian asteroid from the inner regions of the asteroid belt, approximately 8 kilometers (5 miles) in diameter. It was discovered on 11 October 1985, by American astronomer couple Carolyn and Eugene Shoemaker at the Palomar Observatory in California. The S-type asteroid has a rotation period of 3.26 hours. It was named for Australian geologist Victor Gostin.

== Orbit and classification ==
Gostin is a member of the Gondolatsch-cluster within the Flora family (402), a giant asteroid family and the largest family of stony asteroids in the main-belt,

It orbits the Sun in the inner main-belt at a distance of 2.0–2.4 AU once every 3 years and 4 months (1,212 days; semi-major axis of 2.22 AU). Its orbit has an eccentricity of 0.09 and an inclination of 4° with respect to the ecliptic. The body's observation arc begins with its first observation as 1955 SS at the Goethe Link Observatory in September 1955, or 30 years prior to its official discovery observation at Palomar.

== Physical characteristics ==
In the SMASS classification, Gostin is a common, stony S-type asteroid.

=== Rotation period ===
In March 2010, a rotational lightcurve of Gostin was obtained from photometric observations at the Oakley Southern Sky Observatory. Lightcurve analysis gave a well-defined rotation period of 3.2641 hours with a brightness variation of 0.40 magnitude (U=3). Concurring lightcurves were also obtained at the Palomar Transient Factory and at the Etscorn Campus Observatory (U=3/2/3).

=== Diameter and albedo ===
According to the survey carried out by the NEOWISE mission of NASA's Wide-field Infrared Survey Explorer, Gostin measures 7.148 and 7.613 kilometers in diameter and its surface has an albedo of 0.239 and 0.2127, respectively. The Collaborative Asteroid Lightcurve Link assumes an albedo of 0.24 – derived from 8 Flora, the parent body of the Flora family – and calculates a diameter of 8.58 kilometers based on an absolute magnitude of 12.5.

== Naming ==
This minor planet was named by the discoverers after Australian geologist Victor Gostin (born 1940) of the University of Adelaide, who in the 1980s discovered the ejecta layer from the Acraman bolide impact at a distance of 300 kilometers from the impact site, within Ediacaran sedimentary rocks of the Flinders Ranges, South Australia, which enabled the impact to be dated at ~580 Ma. The official naming citation was published by the Minor Planet Center on 2 February 1988 (M.P.C. 12808).
