= Hindley Street =

Street in Adelaide

Hindley Street South Australia
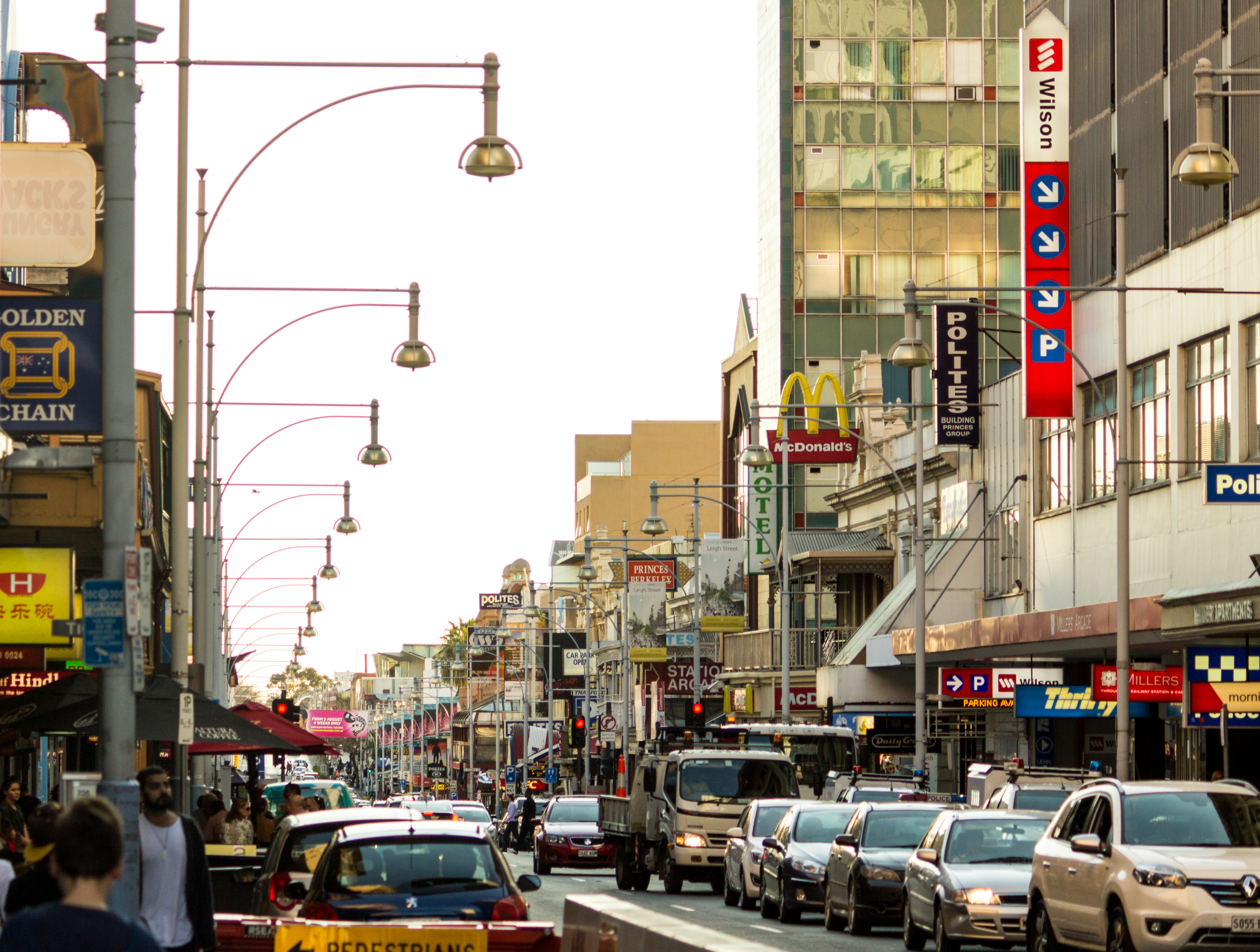
- Hindley Street, facing west
- Coordinates: 34.923566°S 138.587405°E (West end); 34.922995°S 138.599515°E (East end)

General information
- Type: Street
- Location: Adelaide city centre
- Length: 1.1 km (0.7 mi)
- Opened: 1837

Major junctions
- West end: West Terrace; Adelaide
- Morphett Street
- East end: King William Street; Adelaide

Location(s)
- LGA(s): City of Adelaide

Hindley Street (pronounced /ˈhaɪn(d)liː/) is located in the north-west quarter of the centre of Adelaide, the capital of South Australia. It runs between King William Street and West Terrace. The street was named after Charles Hindley, a British parliamentarian and social reformist.

The street was one of the first built in Adelaide and is of historical significance for a number of reasons. As well as housing the first meeting of Adelaide City Council, the oldest municipal body in Australia, in November 1840, Hindley Street was home to the first stone church in South Australia; it was also the location of the first movie shown in the colony and the first cinema in the state. The West End Brewery operated in the street between 1859 and 1980.

The street later became known for its atmosphere and active nightlife, including a somewhat seedy reputation, until in the 21st century it reinvented itself as a more upmarket precinct, dubbed the West End.

== History ==
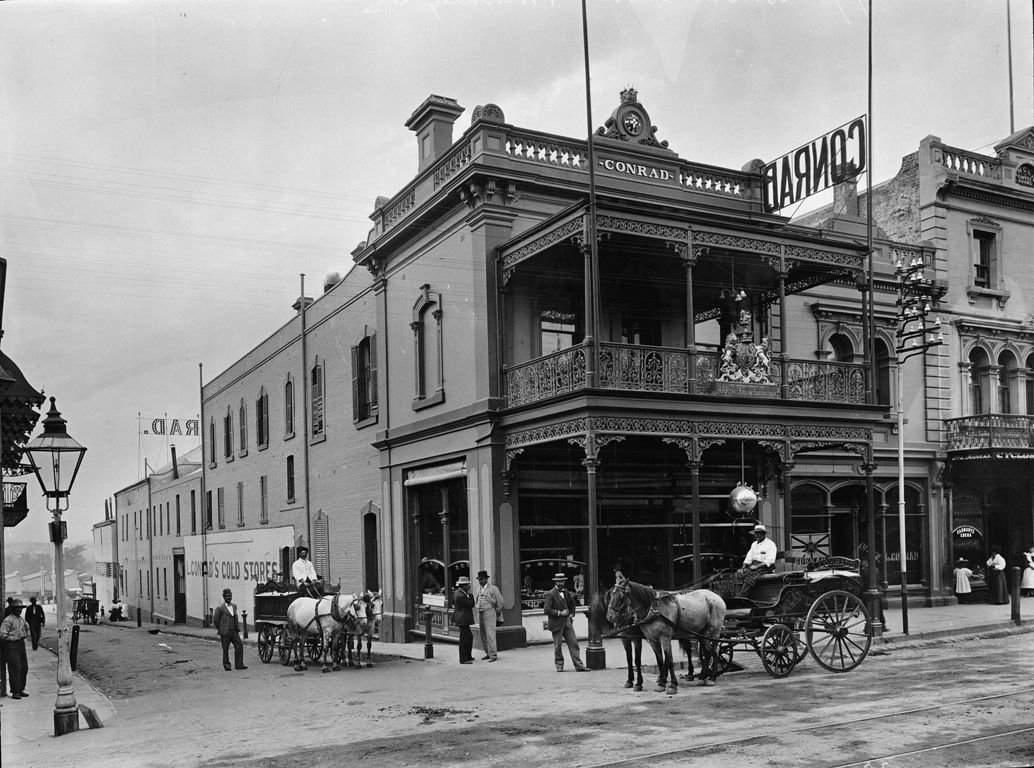
Conrad's butcher, NE corner of Hindley and Victoria Streets, 1899 (replaced by the Metro Theatre in 1939)

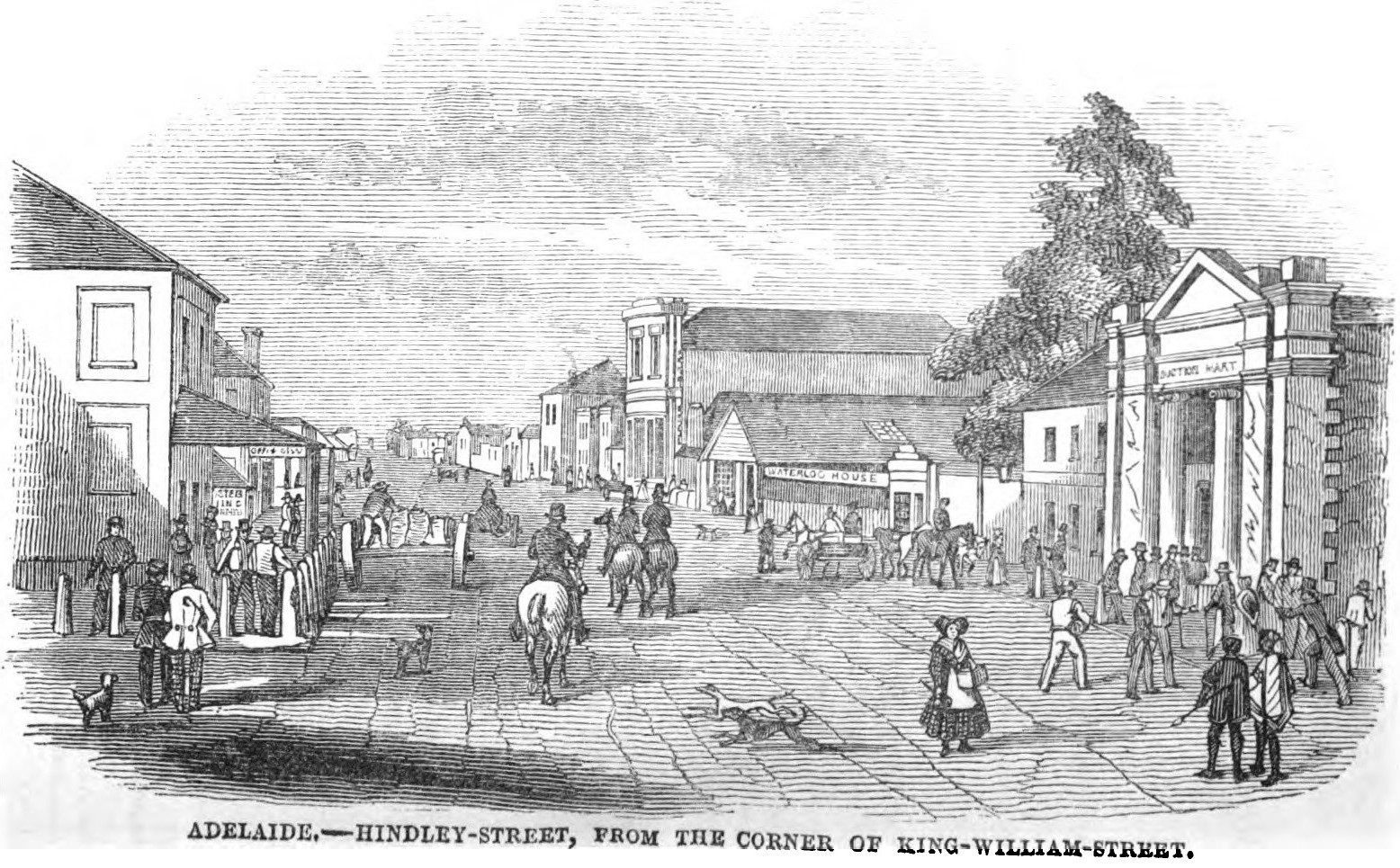
Hindley Street, 1849, from the corner of King William St

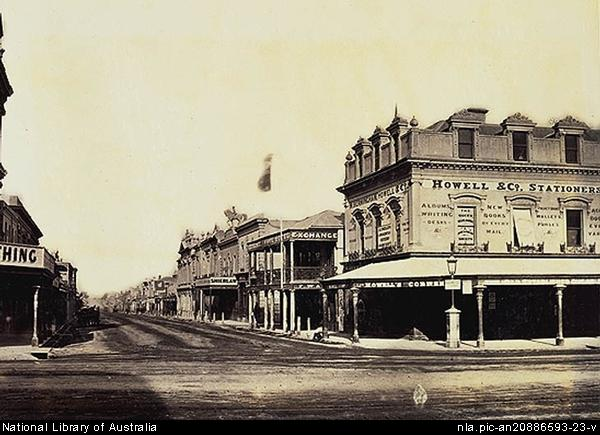
Hindley Street circa 1869

=== 19th century ===
Hindley Street is one of Adelaide's most prominent streets, with an extensive and illustrious history. The street itself was named in honour of British politician Charles Hindley, who had been director of both the South Australian Company and the Union Bank of Australia. He died in November 1857, without ever visiting South Australia. The doings of the population of Adelaide were directly connected to the street, and when the city was first developed after the colonisation of South Australia in 1836, permission was given to cut down trees in favour of constructing buildings and paving streets–the west end of Hindley Street being one of the first locations to receive such development. Independent minister Thomas Playford bought acre 51 in 1837, moving there with his family in 1844. The street was seen as a very desirable place to live.

The first newspaper in South Australia, the South Australian Gazette and Colonial Register, was printed in premises on Hindley Street, on 3 June 1837. The Stanhope press that printed it still survives, held in a collection by History SA.

For many years, the street was the centre of trade and finance for Adelaide, and it was expected to hold that position as time passed. This was because Adelaide was a very young city at the time, with the majority of settlers coming from the west with the water sourced from the River Torrens. Immigrants who landed at Port Adelaide would travel to a ford near Hindmarsh, then to the place where Morphett Street ends and Hindley Street begins. Immigration Square was situated westward of the parklands, with most of Adelaide's business and trade being conducted westwards. The "trade" itself was dubious and the subject of much controversy at the time, with many residents outraged at the young girls who would travel down the street drunk due to alcohol trade.

The first meeting of Adelaide City Council the oldest municipal body in Australia, was held in Hindley Street on 4 November 1840.

The first stone church in South Australia was built in Hindley Street.

On 21 April 1856, the Port Adelaide Railway was officially opened and thus took most of the traffic away from Hindley Street. This shaped Adelaide's changing geography, leading to the formation of what it is today–the suburbs away to the foothills in the east were developed, which meant the trade went east. A reporter on the street in 1913: "The place was a veritable cradle for big concerns. First Ware's Exchange Hotel – a little down from King William Street. It is a history in itself, with its sketches and lingering memories of the pioneering days. To walk through its big low-ceilinged rooms is to think at once of the drovers and farmers who once made merry there. To see the photographs – quaint and laughable – of old George Coppin, the first lessee... when it was built in 1839 is to recall a good comedian of the early years".

On 20 September 1855, an episode of violence erupted on Hindley Street. It was during the Legislative Council election, which saw a mob attempting to interfere with the voting at West Adelaide. Later that same day a much larger riot developed in the same place, after the election was closed. At that time the colony of South Australia was ruled by a governor appointed by the British Government, and the elections were a move towards self-government for the colony.

A new brewery was built on Town Acre 66 on the south side of Hindley Street, midway between Morphett Street and West Terrace, in 1859, known as the West End Brewery. The highly successful brewery was taken over by the South Australian Brewing, Malting, Wine and Spirit Company, an amalgamation of three brewers, in 1888.

In August 1863, Leopold Conrad opened his butcher's shop at 88-90 Hindley Street, on the corner of Victoria Street, where it operated for decades. By 1899, the building had been enlarged, with a second storey and ornamental lacework on the upstairs verandah, which included a coat of arms. Conrad died in December 1918, and the business was taken over by W. H. Bruce, and expanded to Rundle Street, East End Market, and Port Adelaide. (Note: Sign reads "L. Conrad, Wholesale & Retail Butcher". From the State Library of South Australia:"Born 4 October 1839 in Hanover, Germany, Leopold arrived in South Australia in February 1858... He died at his East Terrace residence, Helstonleigh, on 17 December 1918.")

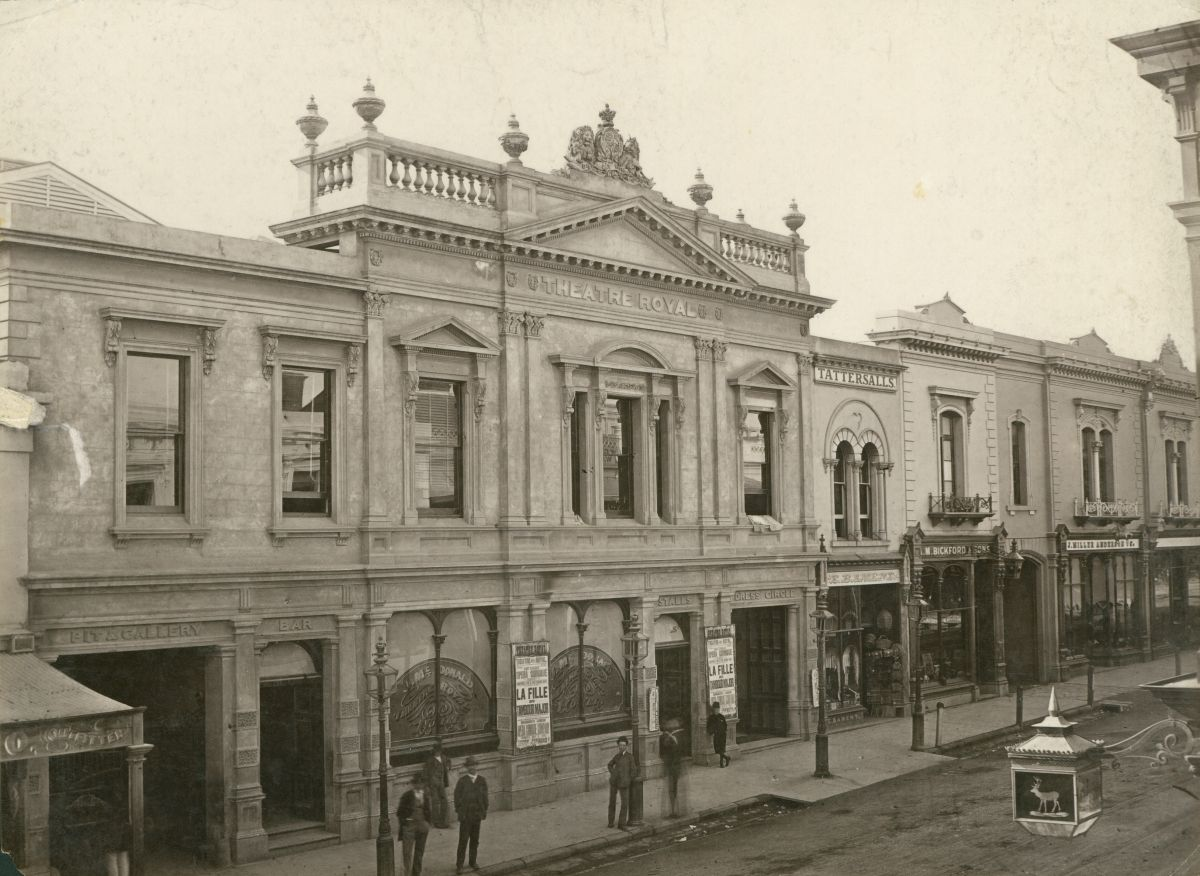
Theatre Royal c. 1881

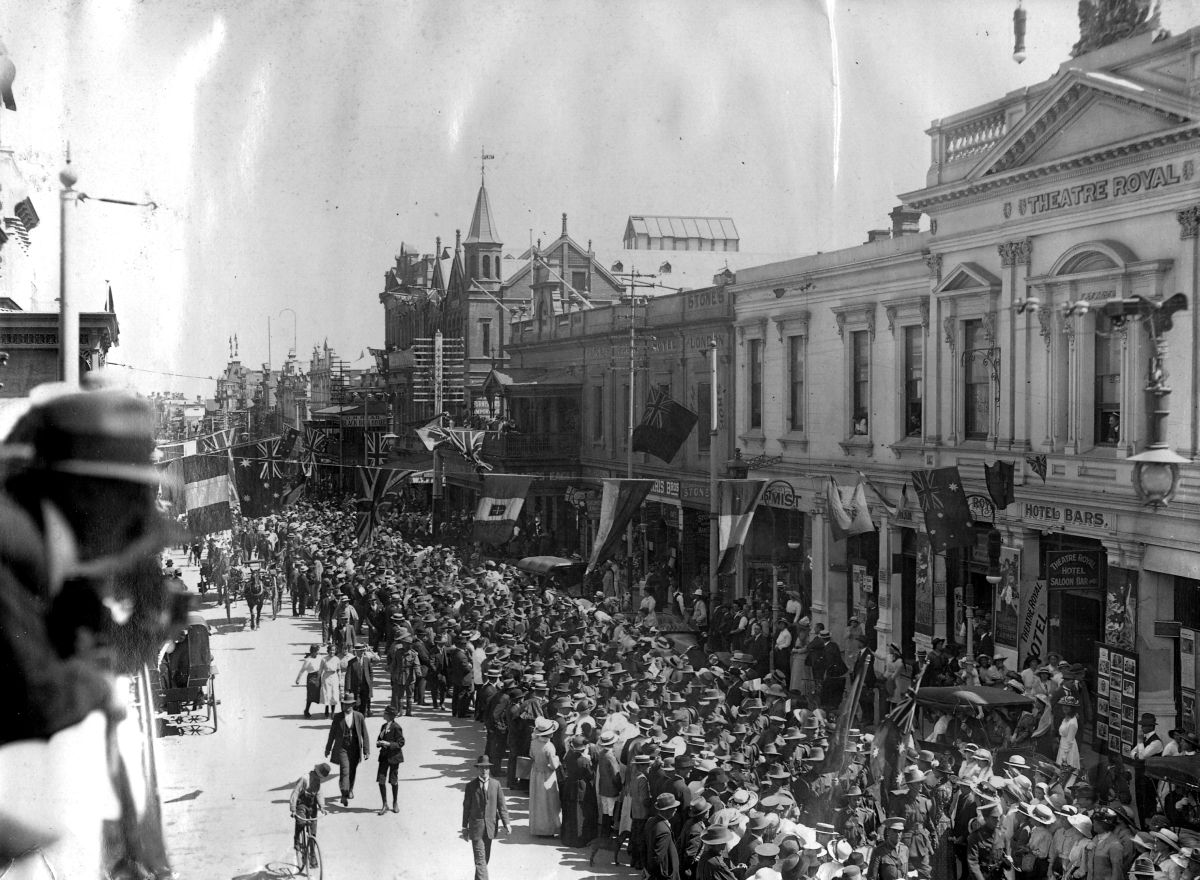
Returning soldiers march past Theatre Royal

Hindley Street was also home to one of Adelaide's most beloved theatres, the Theatre Royal, designed by Melbourne architect George R. Johnson and opened in 1878 (to replace a previous theatre of the same name built on the site in 1868). On 19 October 1896 the first public moving picture demonstration in South Australia was hosted by Wybert Reeve at the Theatre Royal. (By the following evening the cinématographe Lumière had been moved to a more suitable venue at the Beehive Corner). The building was demolished in 1962 and a carpark built on the site by Miller Anderson & Co., an Adelaide department store.

By the 1880s, there were 18 hotels in the street, and the street also became a fashion destination, with many drapers, tailors, boot and shoemakers, and women’s outfitters.

The Grand Coffee Palace was built in 1891. Rebuilt in 1907, it later became the Plaza Hotel. "Coffee palaces" were a type of residential hotel, that provided family-style meals as well as accommodation, but without liquor licences.

=== 20th century ===
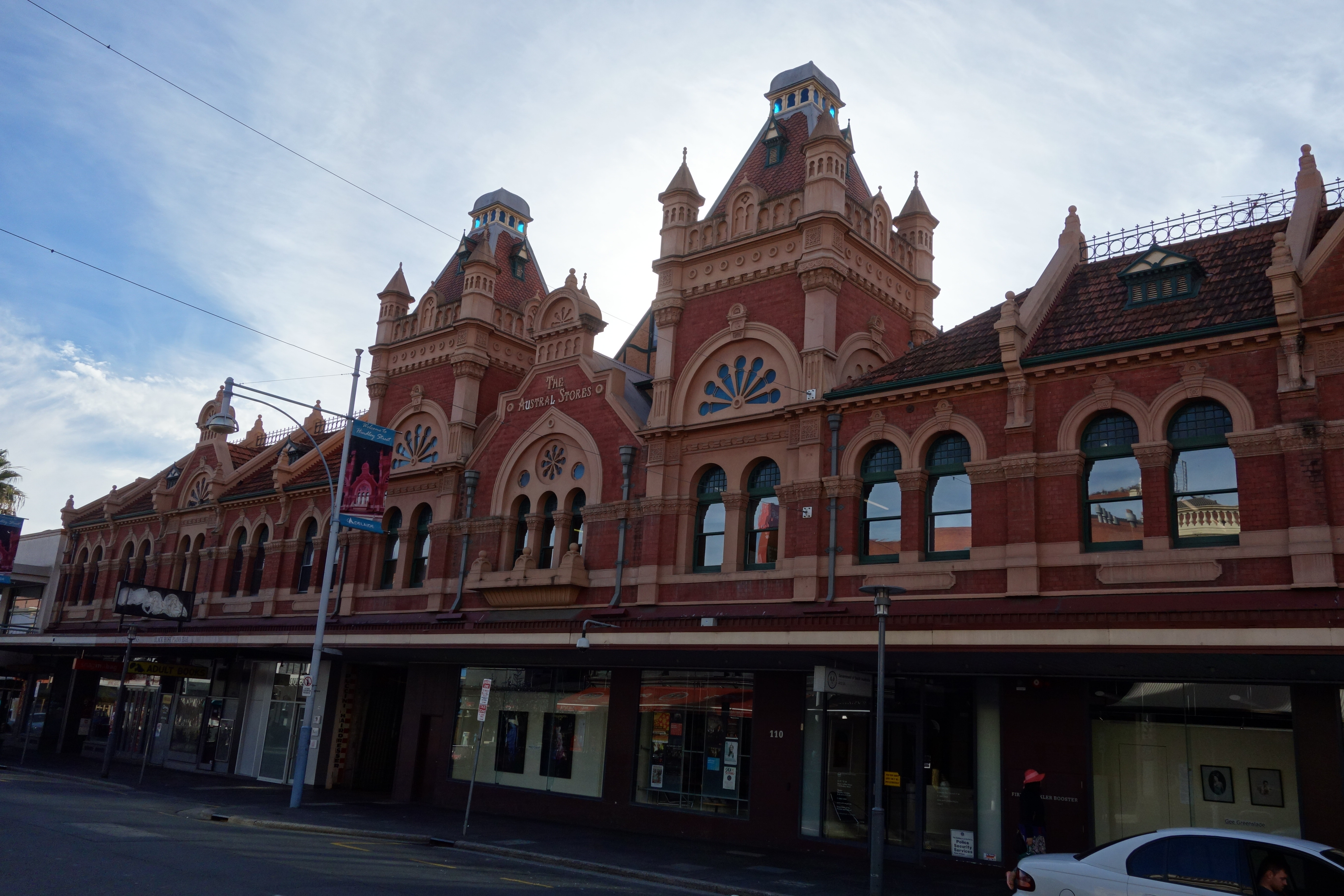
West's Coffee Palace, 110 Hindley Street

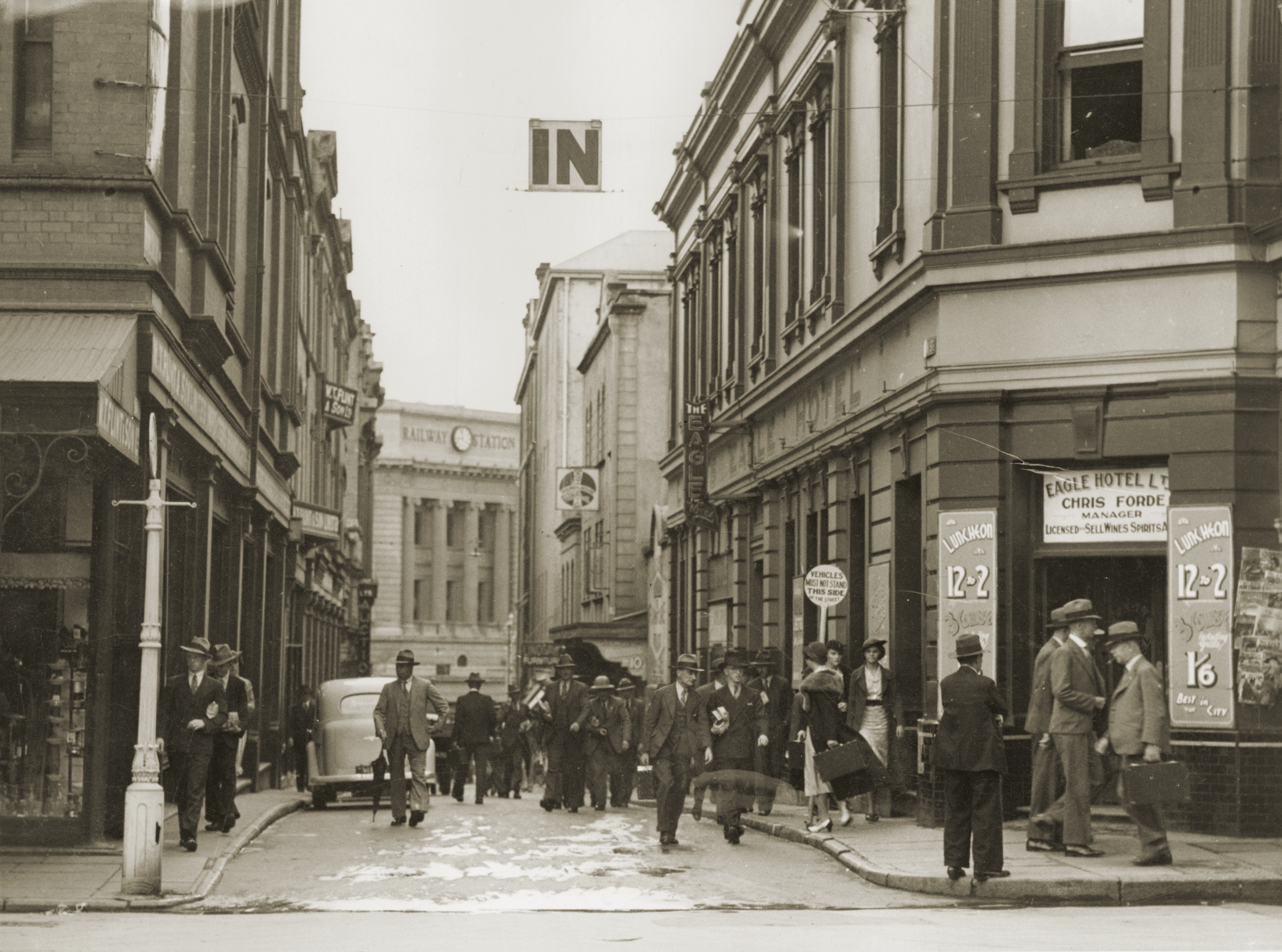
Looking towards North Terrace along Bank Street from Hindley Street, 1937

In the early 20th century, many small retail outlets were closed and larger business opened, such as Hoopers Furnishing Arcade, Federal Furnishing, and WT Flint & Son.

In 1903, the Austral Stores, a complex of 12 shops, large warehouse and residential accommodation, was built to the designs of noted local architect Albert Selmar Conrad at 104–120 Hindley Street. It was listed on the South Australian Heritage Register in 1983 as "an excellent example of Edwardian free style". Its facade is "one of the best examples of the architecture of the Federation period in Adelaide and in South Australia". In 1908 alterations were made, including the addition of a large dining room, and became Grant's Coffee Palace, later West's Coffee Palace. The building remains to this day. as of 2025 In 2002, The Apothecary 1878, a wine bar and restaurant, was created in part of the building. This premises was rebranded as APOTECA Bar & Restaurant in 2019. APOTECA retains a set of antique pharmacy cabinets that were created before the building itself was constructed. As of 2025 Youth Inc. is another occupant of the building.

In December 1908, West's Olympia the first permanent picture theatre in Adelaide, was established at 91 Hindley Street, in a building converted from a roller-skating rink (originally built as a cyclorama, then used as an ice rink known as the Adelaide Glaciarium). The new cinema, built in the era of silent films, had raked seating with a capacity of 3,000 patrons. It was demolished in 1938, with the new West's Theatre opening in 1939, in a new Art Deco design. This cinema operated until 1977, after which various businesses used the premises, until the Adelaide Symphony Orchestra (ASO) moved in in 2001, creating the Grainger Studio (named after Percy Grainger). As of 2025 it is still occupied by the ASO.

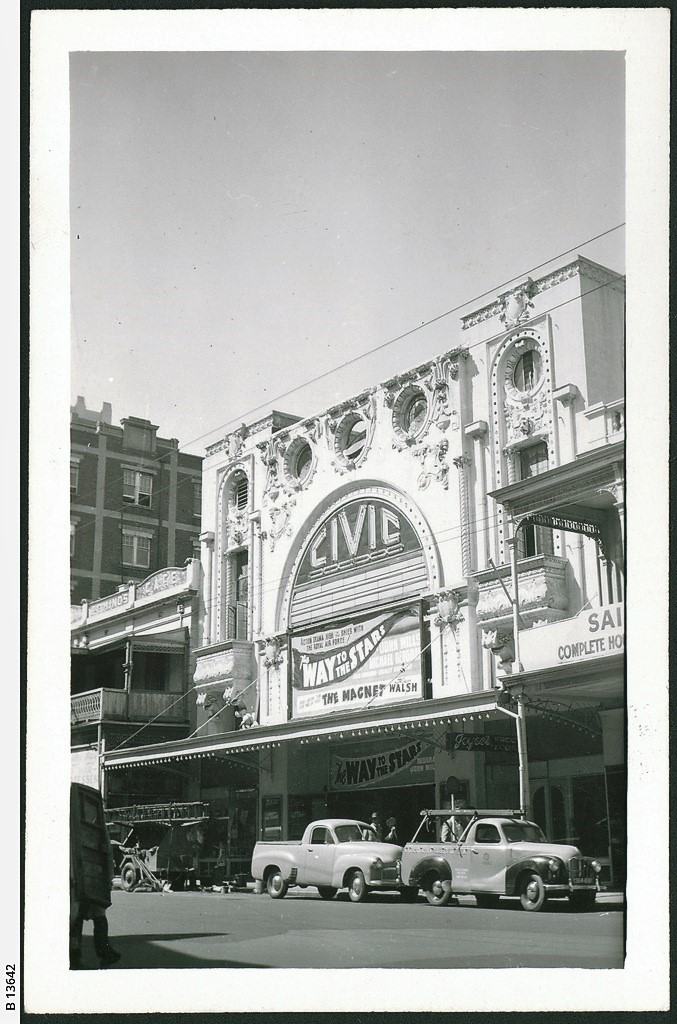
Civic Theatre (formerly the Wondergraph) in 1956

As the 1910s approached, Hindley Street entered a state of despair. Adelaide's daily newspaper, The Advertiser, began reporting on public intoxication in the street as early as 1911.

After 6 o'clock closing came into effect, the number of hotels reduced and various types of saloons, tea rooms, and cafes became popular. These included the Theatre Royal Café, Osborne's Café, and the Comino Café.

By 1912, there were several cinemas in the city, largely clustered around Hindley Street. The new Wondergraph picture theatre was built by the Greater Wondergraph Company from July 1912 at no. 27. Designed by Garlick & Jackman architects, the design of the building was being lauded well before construction, and on the invitation-only event on the night before its official opening night on Friday 5 September 1913, "every seat was occupied by the audience, which went into raptures over the fine appointments of the theatre and the pictures which were shown". The main feature was The Crossing Policeman. (Note: Article says it was called Crossing a Policeman, but it is evidently this one.) The theatre was later extensively remodelled as the Civic Theatre in 1932, sold to S.A. Theatres in 1939, who sold it in August to Greater Union, who were leasing the theatre at the time. The theatre was demolished to make way for the State Theatre in 1957, which closed in May 1977.

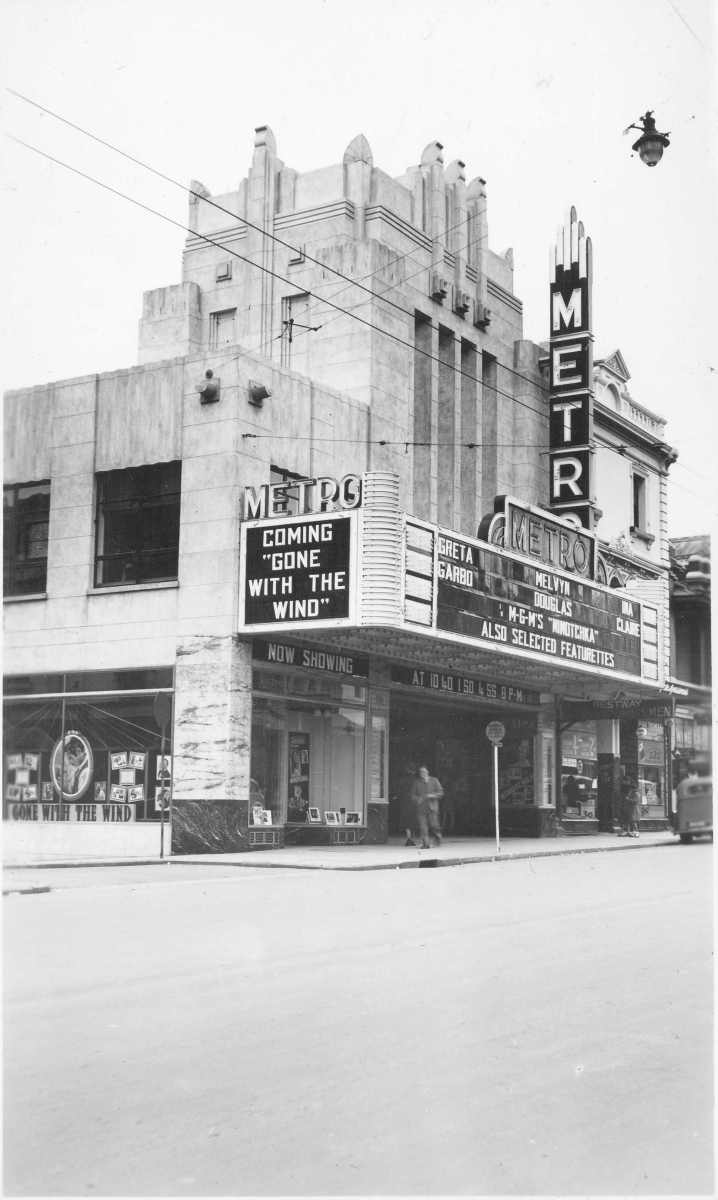
The Art Deco Metro Theatre on Hindley Street, c. 1940.

The Metro Theatre was one of Adelaide's earliest cinemas, and a noted example of Art Deco architecture, was designed by American theatre architect Thomas W. Lamb in association with local architect F. Kenneth Milne. Built on the site of Conrad's butcher shop on the northeast corner of Victoria Street, it opened on 6 October 1939, a luxurious building which included air-conditioning, and accommodated an audience of 1,286 in stalls, dress circle, and lounge. It existed on the corner of Hindley and Victoria Street for many years until it was closed in 1972, then subsequently redeveloped in 1975 as a modern four-screen Greater Union cinema complex, called Hindley Cinemas 1–4. It was here that the film Picnic at Hanging Rock (1975) had its world premiere. This cinema would not endure either; it was closed in 1991 and demolished in 2005, with an apartment building built on the site. As of 2022 a KFC outlet occupies the ground floor, with student accommodation above it.

Cinemas were big in the 1960s. The My Fair Lady Theatre was built specifically for the release of the film My Fair Lady in 1966, and British Empire Films and RKO Radio Pictures set up offices on the street.

In the 1970s, 1980s, and 1990s, Hindley Street became known for its diversity: coffee lounges, restaurants, pubs, ice and roller skating rinks, a late-night chemist, theatres, cinemas, "alternative" bookshops and retail outlets were available along the strip. It was by this time Adelaide's unofficial "nightlife" street, and had also acquired a somewhat seedy reputation. Cabaret, strip clubs, and nightclubs were established in the street. The street became known as being Adelaide's red light district.

In 1982, West End Brewery moved to Thebarton and the building was demolished.

=== 21st century ===
In the early 2000s, the street experienced somewhat of a decline, with several shops closing and left vacant or boarded up, and a consequent lack of daytime foot traffic. Late-night alcohol-fuelled violence and drunken behaviour along the street drove the Adelaide City Council to introduce a 3am lockout, in which all business (predominantly nightclubs) must refuse entry after 3am.

== Location and description ==
Hindley Street is located in the north-west quarter of the centre of Adelaide. It runs between King William Street and West Terrace.

Two pedestrianised streets which run between Hindley and Currie Streets are notable for their historical value, restaurants, bars, and specialist shops: Leigh Street and Peel Street.

In the 21st century, Hindley Street has been given new life by urban renewal and UniSA's City West campus and a number of businesses, creating the city's West End precinct.

There is a heritage walk with a guide provided by the city council.

== Notable premises ==
=== Imprints Booksellers ===
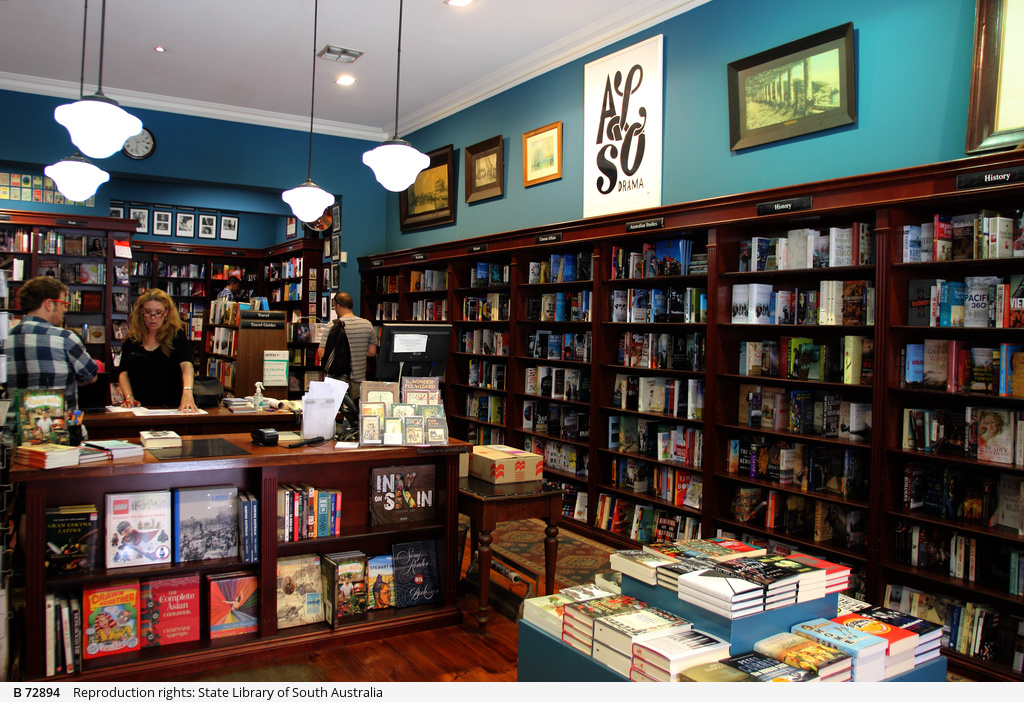
Interior of Imprints Booksellers (2013)

The literary book retailer Imprints Booksellers was founded in 1984 at no. 80 by Graham Miller, father of Greg Mackie, with his wife Gayle Miller and her friend Patricia Sykes. Mackie first worked at the store on weekends when he was still a university student, but six months later bought into the business. From 1984 until 2003 Mackie was director and co-proprietor (with Gayle Miller), of Imprints. It moved to its current (as of March 2024) location no. 107 Hindley Street in 1999, around the time that many arts organisations were moving into the vicinity, including Adelaide Festival offices above the shop.

In 2007, Mackie and Miller sold the shop to Jason Lake and Katherine Woehlert, who had been working there for some time. At the time, the Rudd government was offering stimulus packages; however, the 2008 financial crisis occurred the following year, causing losses. Later, online bookselling and Amazon offered serious competition, along with book superstores such as Borders in Rundle Mall (which closed in mid-2011).

Imprints ran the Adelaide Writers' Week book tent for ten years from 2011, under the direction of Laura Kroetsch and then Jo Dyer.

In 2015, the store was raided by South Australia Police, after a complaint had been lodged that they had been selling unwrapped copies of the new edition of the cult novel American Psycho, by Bret Easton Ellis. The novel, first published in 1991, had been classified as R18+ under national censorship legislation since its release, which meant that it was only allowed to be sold in plastic to persons over 18.

Restrictions on people's movements during the COVID-19 pandemic caused business in Adelaide's CBD to decline from mid-2020. In December 2021, Woehlert was diagnosed with breast cancer, just as they were preparing for the 2022 Writers Week. They managed that one, but found that they were running out of energy to run the shop, and put it on the market in February 2024.

=== Hindley Street Music Hall ===
Hindley Street Music Hall, a large live music venue, opened in August 2022, after the site of the HQ nightclub complex was bought by Live Nation Australia and a purpose-built split-level live music space created.

== Architecture and art ==
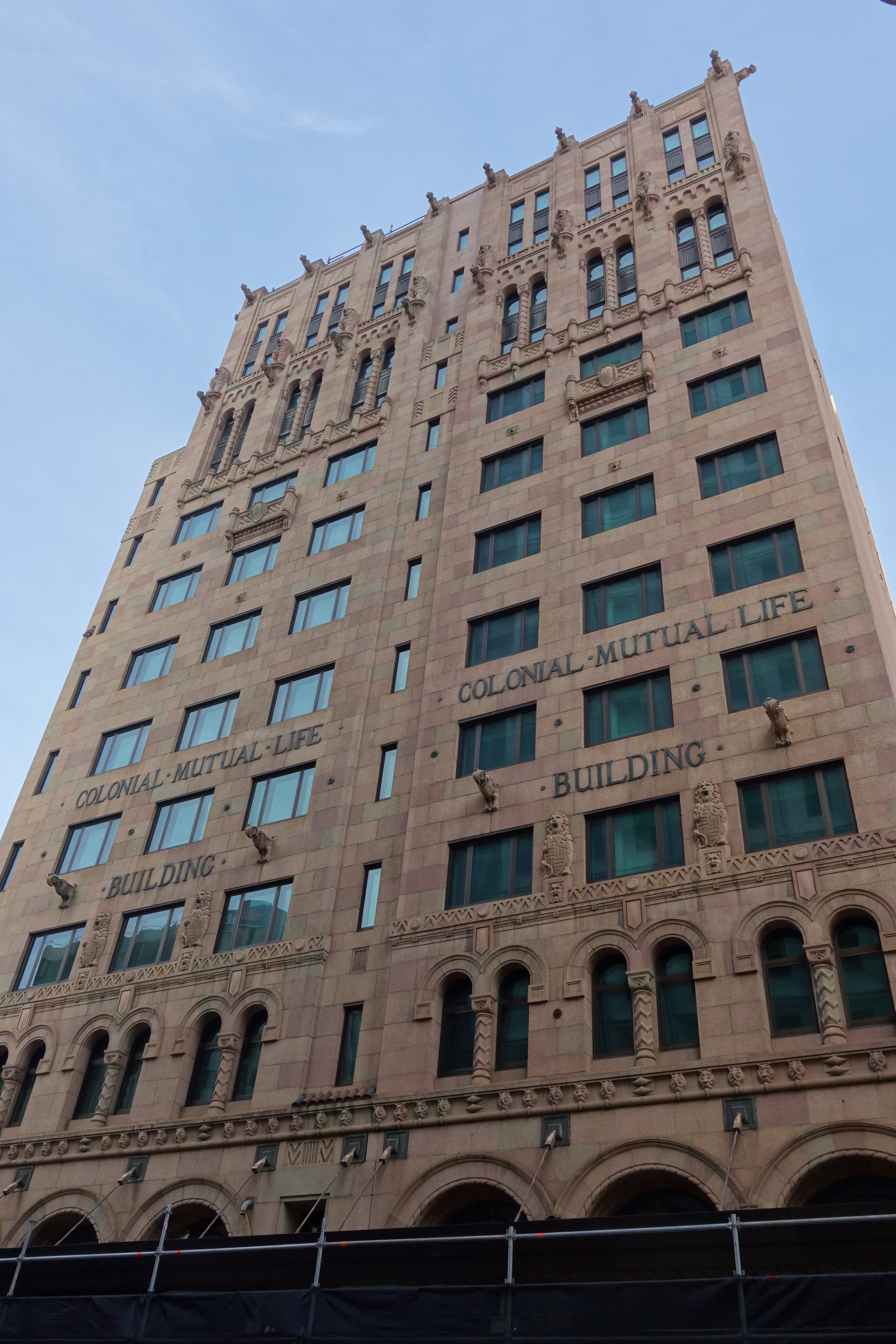
The Mayfair Hotel, no. 158 (formerly Colonial Mutual Life)

Notable buildings include the five-star Mayfair Hotel, formerly the Colonial Mutual Life building, which opened in 1934, with Premier Richard Layton Butler calling it "a monument to future confidence in our country". Built in only nine months, it provided work for local tradesmen during the Great Depression, and was the tallest building in Adelaide for around 30 years. The building was for years the home of the first commercial radio station in South Australia, Radio 5DN, before being abandoned for a while and then refurbished in 2014 as the Mayfair.

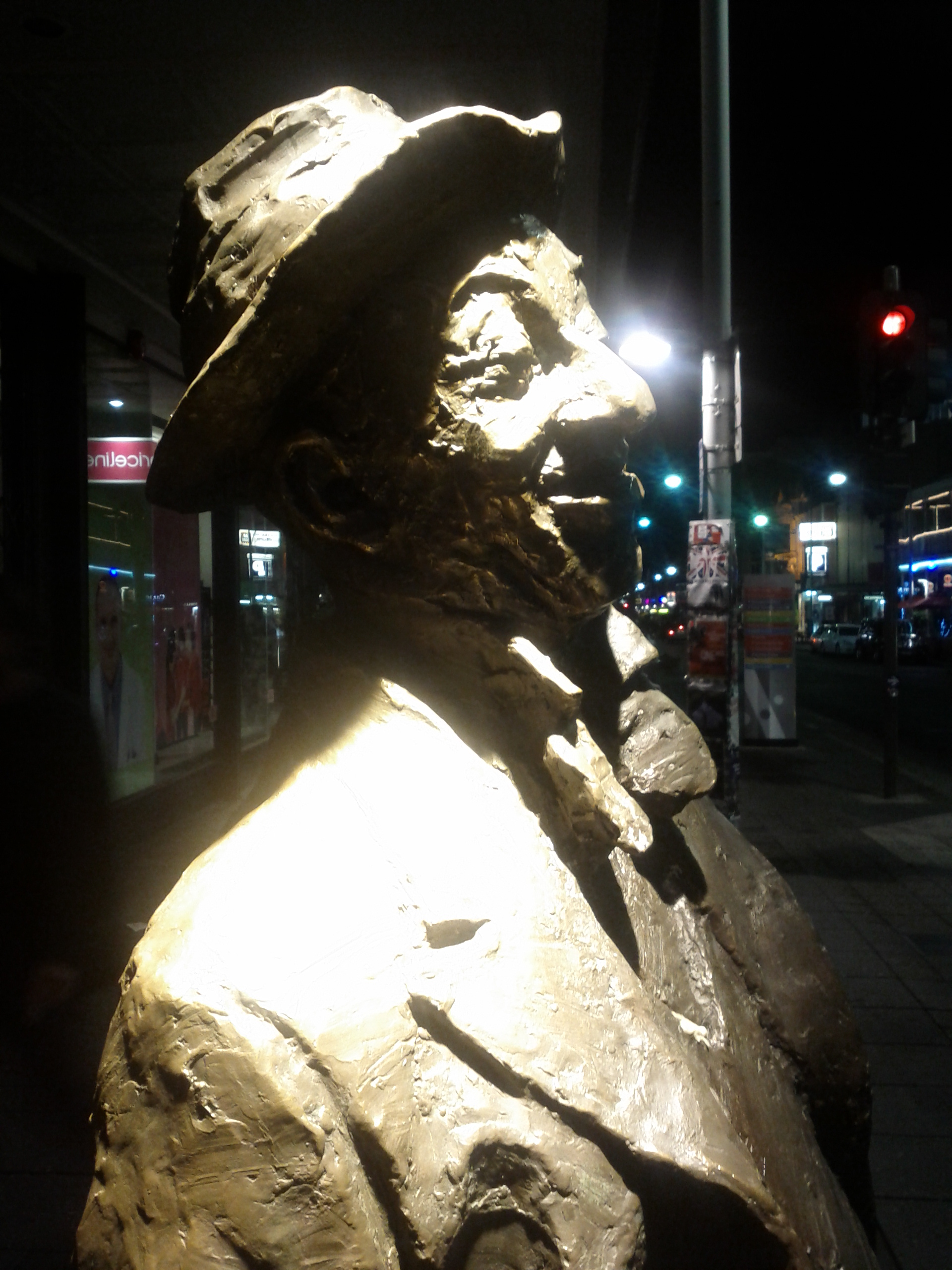
Roy Rene statue

There is a bronze statue of comedian and vaudevillian Roy Rene in the street, sculpted by Robert Hannaford.

== In popular culture ==
"Hindley Street", a song by Australian band Powderfinger on its album Internationalist, was written about the street.

Hindley Street is mentioned in the song "Carrington Cabaret" by Redgum on their 1978 album If You Don't Fight You Lose.

The street features in the 2023 film Emotion Is Dead, written and directed by Pete Williams.

The Australian cover band, the Hindley Street Country Club is named after the live music scene of the 1970s, 80s and 90s.
