= Hindley Street Country Club =

Australian music group

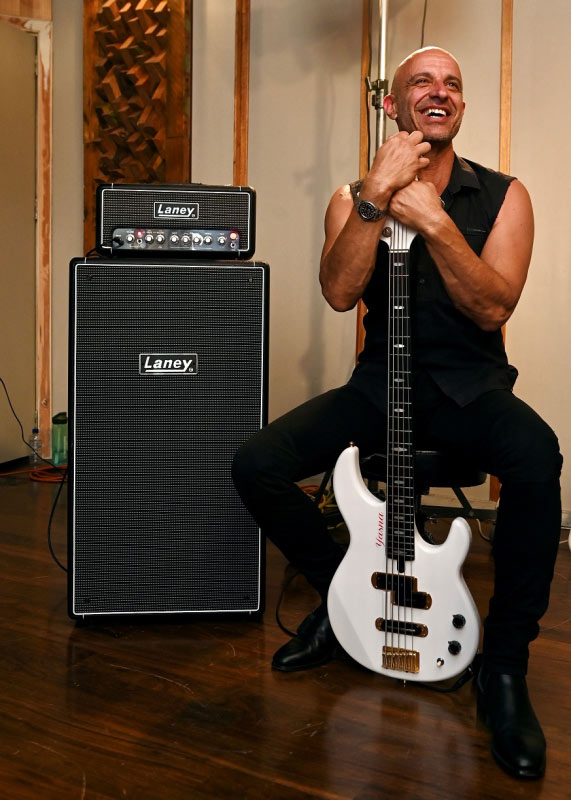
- Founder - Constantine Delo

Background information
- Origin: Adelaide, Australia
- Genres: Pop, rock, disco, soul
- Years active: 2017–present
- Members: Con Delo; Danny Lopresto; Jordan Lennon; Kat Jade; Brad Polain; Jason McMahon; Dave Ross; Nat Brice; Jake Millic; Steve Todd
- Website: thehscc.com

Hindley Street Country Club (HSCC) is an Australian music collective and online performance project. Originally conceived as a studio-based initiative to reinterpret classic songs with high production values, HSCC has developed into one of the most widely viewed cover music acts globally, generating over one billion cumulative views across digital platforms and attracting a substantial international audience.

The group is recognised for its polished recreations of popular songs spanning the 1970s through to the 1990s, featuring a rotating lineup of professional musicians and vocalists drawn largely from South Australia’s music community. Since its formation, HSCC has recorded and released more than 300 performances, many of which have individually attracted over one million views, contributing to sustained audience growth and high engagement across platforms.

HSCC’s rise has been driven by a consistent digital release strategy, including regular weekly video uploads, and a strong presence across YouTube, Facebook, and TikTok. The project has accumulated more than 1.7 million YouTube subscribers and hundreds of millions of views on the platform alone, with total global viewership exceeding one billion across all platforms. Its audience is notably international, with significant viewership in North America, Europe, Asia, and Australia, reflecting the global circulation of music content in the digital era.

The band has received recognition from established figures within the international music industry, including members of Fleetwood Mac and Kiss, as well as artists such as Christopher Cross and Leo Sayer, who have publicly praised the group’s reinterpretations of their work. The project has also been supported by Australian concert promoter Michael Chugg, contributing to its transition into large-scale live performance.

By the early 2020s, HSCC had evolved from an online studio project into an international touring act, performing across Australia and overseas at major venues and events. Their live performances are noted for closely replicating the arrangements and production quality of their studio recordings, reinforcing their reputation as a leading contemporary cover act and illustrating the growing convergence between digital music production and live performance.

The Hindley Street Country Club derives its name from Hindley Street in Adelaide, South Australia, a location where many group members performed at various venues during the peak of the street's live music scene in the 1970s, '80s, and '90s.

== History ==
HSCC was established in 2017 by producer and bassist Constantine Delo, and producer and keyboardist Darren Mullan as a project by a group of live Adelaide musicians, getting together and recording re-arranged covers popular with Australian audiences and uploading them weekly to social media channels.

Darren Mullan departed the band in 2021, prior to the band's later international growth and success.

In 2024, Mark Pope, Australian artist manager and producer, teamed up with entrepreneur and businessman Michael Chugg to take on the touring management and promotion of the band. In May 2024, Cold Chisel's Ian Moss guested with Hindley Street Country Club on their cover of the Beatles' "While My Guitar Gently Weeps". Later that year, the group travelled to Singapore to perform at the Singapore Grand Prix on the Marina Bay Street Circuit and in Manila, Philippines in their first overseas performances.

As of June 2025, the band is self-managed and has over 1.33 million subscribers and 800 million views on YouTube and continues to tour across Australia, Asia, the UK, Europe, Brazil, and the United States.

HSCC performed at the 50th anniversary of the Cathay/HSBC Hong Kong Sevens in April 2026, one of Asia’s largest international sporting and entertainment events, held at Kai Tak Stadium. The group headlined the closing day of the tournament, delivering a large-scale live performance featuring their signature repertoire of 1970s and 1980s songs to a global audience. Their appearance formed part of a major entertainment program accompanying the tournament, which attracts tens of thousands of spectators and international visitors each year, and highlighted the band’s transition from an online project to a prominent live act on the global stage.

== Band members ==
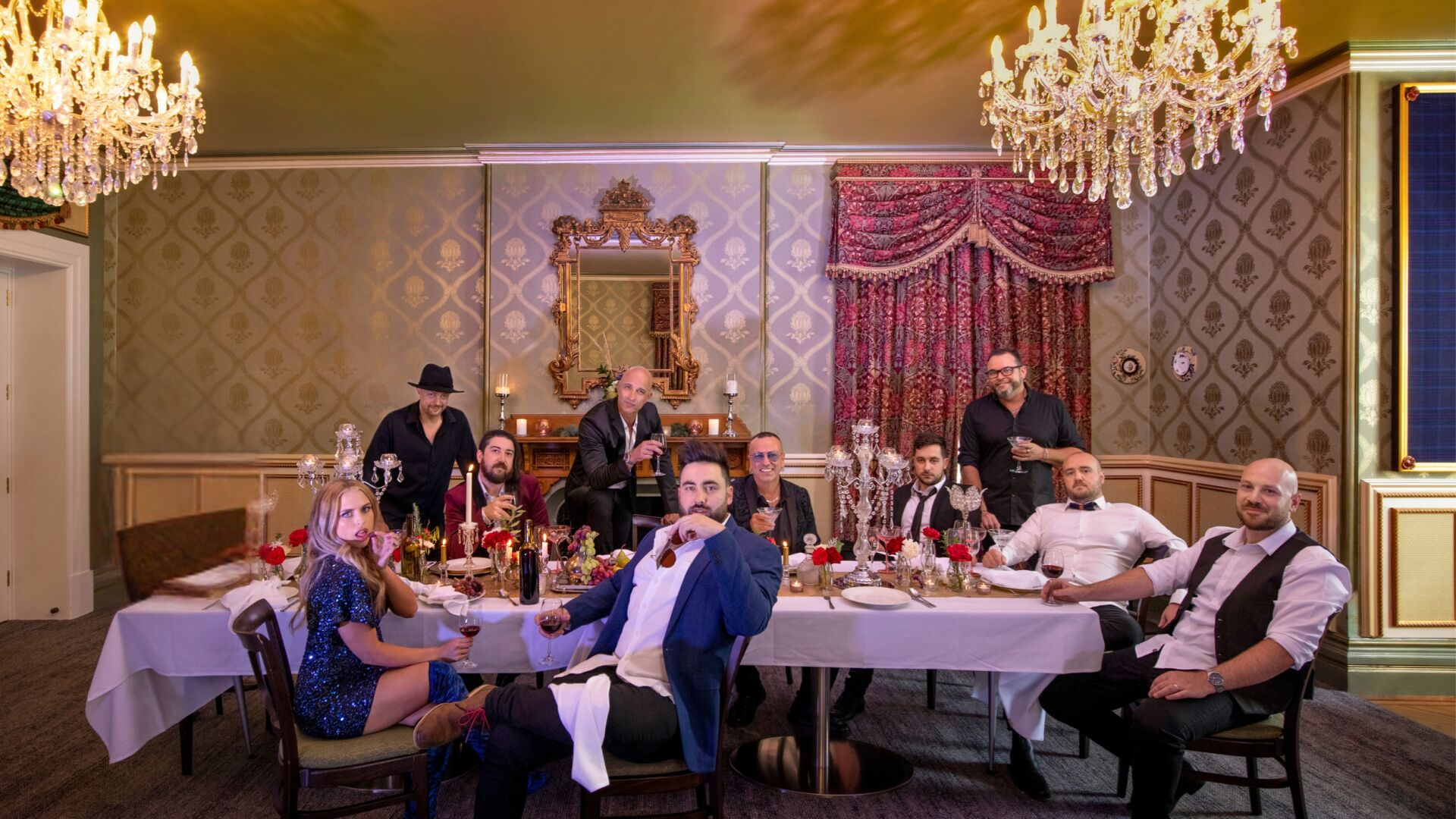
Hindley Street Country Club in 2024

The band has been made up of a rotating lineup of local musicians, depending on what is required to reproduce the original song. However, on tour, the band has a core lineup.

=== Current members of the touring lineup ===
As of the band's 2026 Australian Tour, the current members are:

- Constantine Delo – founder, arranger, vocals, bass guitar
- Kat Jade – vocals (Mezzo/Soprano)
- Jordan Lennon – vocals (Tenor, Falsetto/Octave), guitar, drums, Octapad
- Danny Lopresto – vocals (High-Tenor), guitar
- Jason McMahon – saxophone, percussion, vocals
- Jake Milic – guitar
- Steve Williams – guitar (sub for Jake Milic)
- Bradley Polain – drums, vocals
- Ses Granozio – drums (sub for Bradley Polain)
- Dave Ross – keyboards , Vocoder
- Nat Brice – keyboards, piano
- Steve Todd - Percussion

=== Former Vocalists ===
- Nikki Kosmider Heuskes – vocals (Mezzo)
- Sarah Lloyde – vocals (Mezzo)
- Pina Del Re – vocals (Mezzo)
- Lesley Williams – vocals (Alto/Mezzo)
- Andy Seymour - Vocals (Baritone)
