= Grecian (barque) =

Australian sailing ship

Grecian was a sailing ship which was wrecked in a storm off Port Adelaide, South Australia in October 1850.

== History ==
Grecian, a fine barque, of 518 tons, sailed from The Downs bound for South Australia on 15 June 1850, almost exactly one year after her first such voyage. The trip was uneventful and she arrived in Gulf St Vincent on Sunday, 13 October, and made the light ship at about 4 pm. The weather was very stormy, with the wind blowing a full gale from the west-north-west. Grecian was anchored in apparent safety riding with a single anchor, with 65 fathoms (390 feet (120 m)) chain, and the passengers were served their dinner.

At about 5:30, the gale increased, and another 75 fathoms were added to the anchor chain. At about 7 pm, the gale still increasing, and the ship driving rapidly towards the shore, the second anchor was let go. Despite the two anchors, of 70 and 90 cwt. (3.5 and 4.5 tonnes), the ship continued driving until 9 pm, when she struck the beach. The rudder and sternpost were knocked away, carrying away part of the poop and after-cabin. It was then deemed prudent to slip one anchor. The striking of the vessel, continued, when the remaining anchor was slipped, and she broached broadside on, the sea breaking over her fore and aft, to the terror of the passengers. Captain "Magnificent George" Hyde, the master of the vessel, ordered the release of the longboat, and got the passengers into the longboat, and the officers and crew into the lifeboat. The captain, carpenter, and third officer remained with the ship. One passenger, Mr. Leslie, a brother of Mrs. Giles, of Port Adelaide, was somehow unable to make it to the boats and was presumed drowned.

With all hope for the ship gone, the captain left in the jolly boat, and found the longboat onshore at the point. He then took charge of the lifeboat and landed the ladies on Torrens Island, where, from 6 am. to 3 pm., they were without food or shelter. With much difficulty, the captain readied the ship Digby, and returned with provisions for the passengers. The steam tug soon arrived, and most of the passengers were conveyed to the Port. The remainder landed on the beach, some at Port Gawler, and reached Port Adelaide later. The next day, Grecian was found to be on her beam ends and broken up, beyond repair.

The passengers were:— Mrs. George Hyde, Mrs. Sarah Wigley, Miss Maria C. Wigley, Nathaniel A. Knox, Anne Jane Knox, Miss Henrietta Knox, Miss Sydney Knox (who married John Acraman), Nathaniel Knox, jnr., William Knox, Rose Mahony, Dr. Brendt, Richard Box, jnr., Charles J. Anstey, Thomas Fowler and Mrs. Fowler and her two children, and Mr. Leslie. The officers and crew numbered 25 in all. The Grecian and her cargo were estimated to be worth at least £80,000 (around AUD 50 million today).

== Postscript ==
Two old-fashioned cannon of similar design were, eight years apart, found at the entrance to the Port, and believed to have belonged to Grecian.
