= Acraman impact structure =

Impact crater in South Australia

Acraman crater
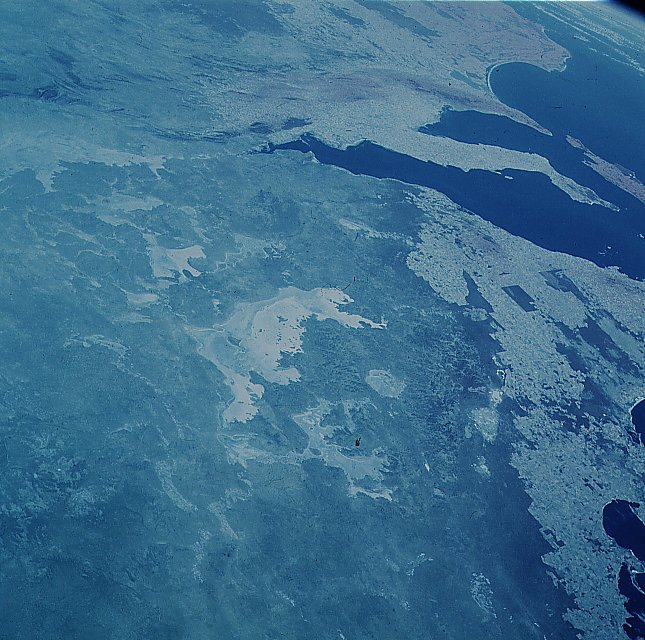
- Acraman lake (circle), ringed by Lake Gairdner and others, outlining the Acraman crater depression

- Location within South Australia
- Location: Gawler Ranges, South Australia, Australia; 32°1′S 135°27′E

Impact crater structure
- Confidence: Confirmed
- Diameter: up to 90 km (56 mi)
- Age: ~590 Ma; Late Ediacaran
- Exposed: Yes
- Drilled: No
- Bolide type: Chondrite

Acraman impact structure is a deeply eroded impact crater in the Gawler Ranges of South Australia. Its location is marked by Lake Acraman, a circular ephemeral playa lake about 20 kilometres (12 mi) in diameter. The discovery of the impact structure and independent discovery of its ejecta were first reported in the journal Science in 1986 by George E. Williams and Victor A. Gostin. The evidence for impact includes the presence of shatter cones and shocked quartz in shattered bedrock on islands within Lake Acraman.

The impact structure is deeply eroded, and its original size must be inferred by indirect means. Some authors estimate an original diameter of up to 85 to 90 kilometres (53 to 56 mi), while other suggest a smaller size, perhaps only 35 to 40 kilometres (22 to 25 mi), closer to that of the depression in which Lake Acraman is centred. The larger size estimate would imply an energy release of 5.2 million megatons of TNT.

The impact event is estimated to have occurred about 590 million years ago during the Ediacaran; this age is not derived from the crater itself but from the position of ejecta within nearby sedimentary basins.

The Lake Acraman Impact Structure is listed on the South Australian Heritage Register.

== Ejecta layer ==
A widespread layer of ejecta, believed to be from the Acraman impact structure, is found within Ediacaran rocks of the Flinders Ranges at least 300 kilometres (190 mi) east of the crater, and in drill holes from the Officer Basin to the north. At the time these areas were shallow sea, and the ejecta settled into mud on the sea floor. The ejecta, containing shocked minerals and small shatter cones, is composed of rock similar in age and composition to that at the crater, and is associated with an iridium anomaly suggesting contamination with extraterrestrial material. An evolutionary radiation within marine microorganisms (acritarchs) occurs just above the level as the ejecta layer, and some authors believe there may be a connection. The proximity of the crater to the type area for the Ediacara Biota is noted, though probably not significant given the likely global consequences of the impact.

== John Acraman ==
The Acraman impact structure, Lake Acraman and the nearby Acraman Creek are named after South Australian colonial businessman John Acraman.

== Gallery ==
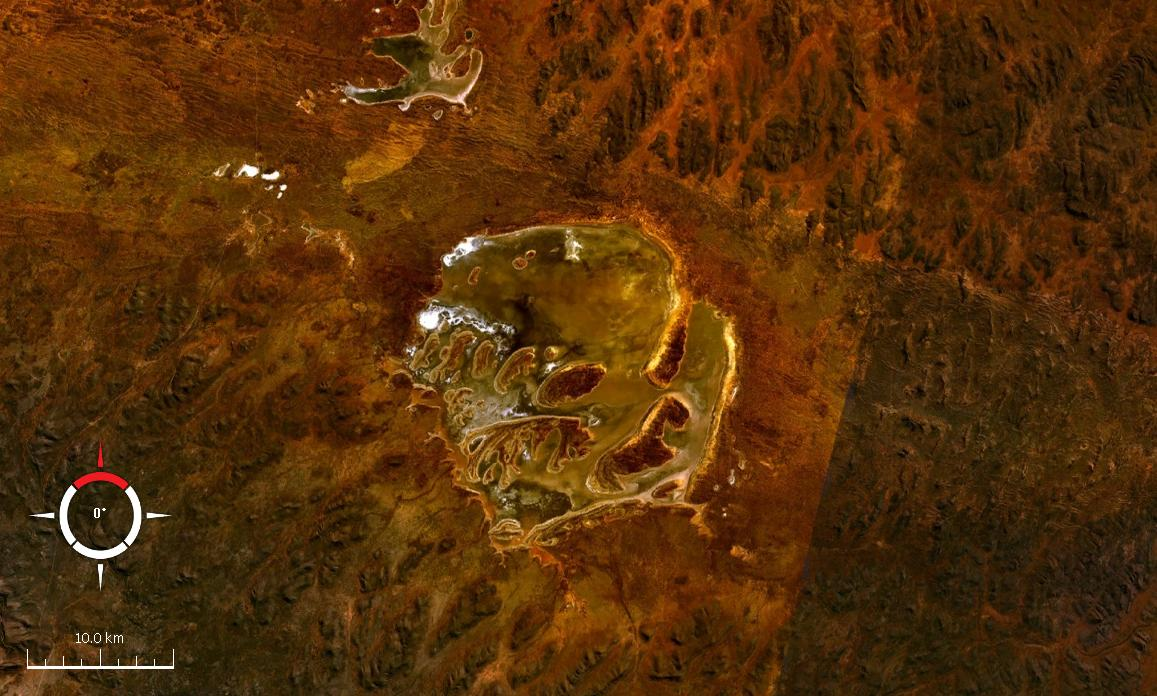
Landsat image of Lake Acraman; screen capture from NASA World Wind

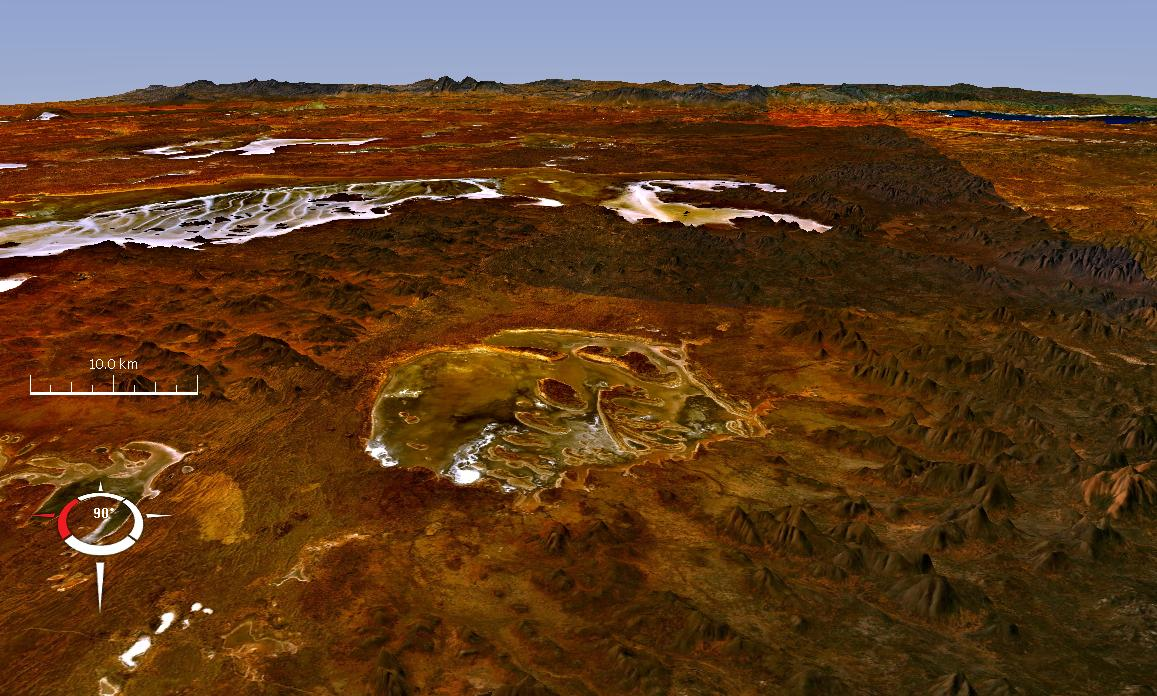
Oblique Landsat image of Lake Acraman draped over digital elevation model (10x vertical exaggeration), looking east towards the Flinders Ranges where ejecta has been found; screen capture from NASA World Wind.

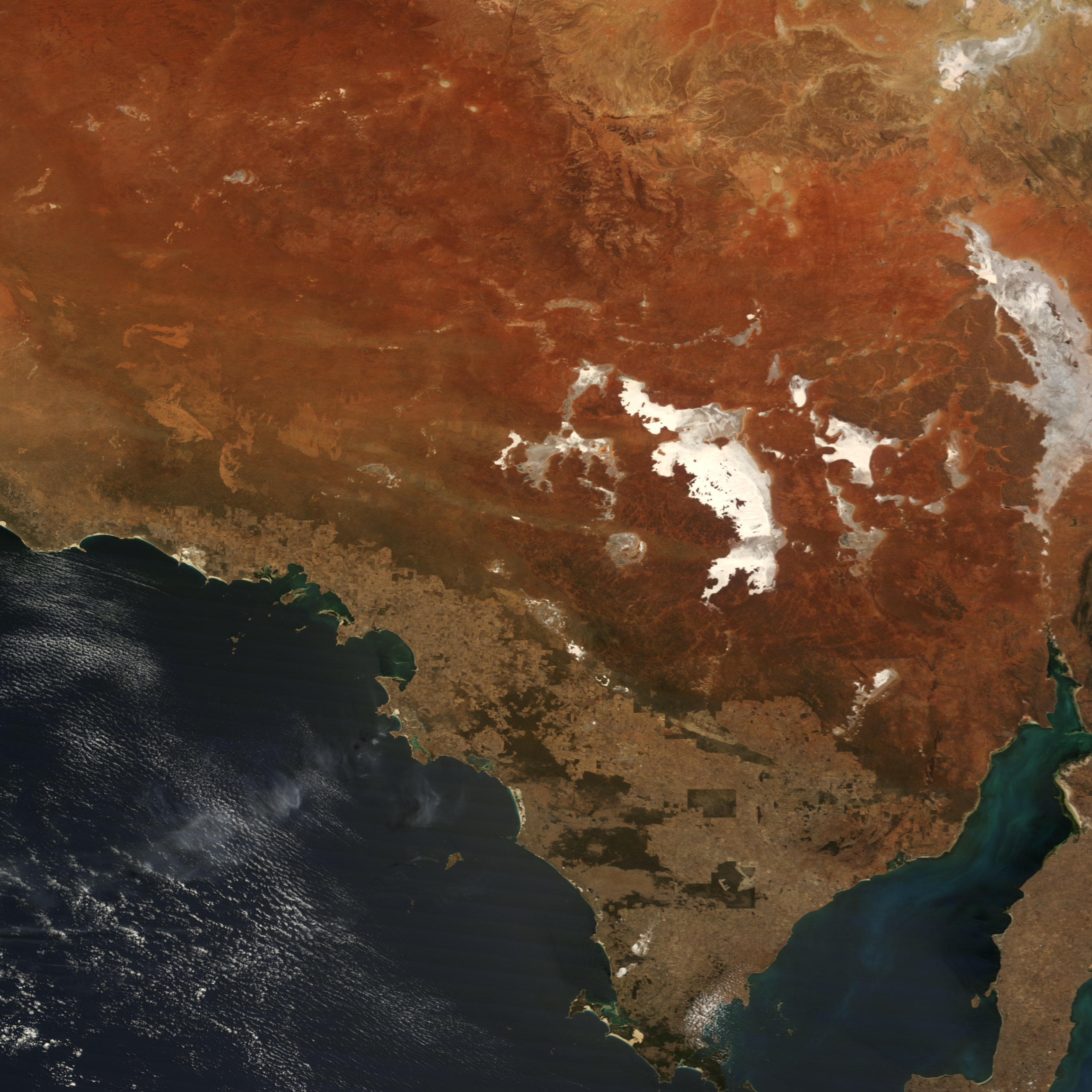
Orange and brown soils mix with off-white saltpans, including Lake Gairdner and Lake Everard in this true-colour image.
