= Victor Gostin =

Australian geologist (born 1940)

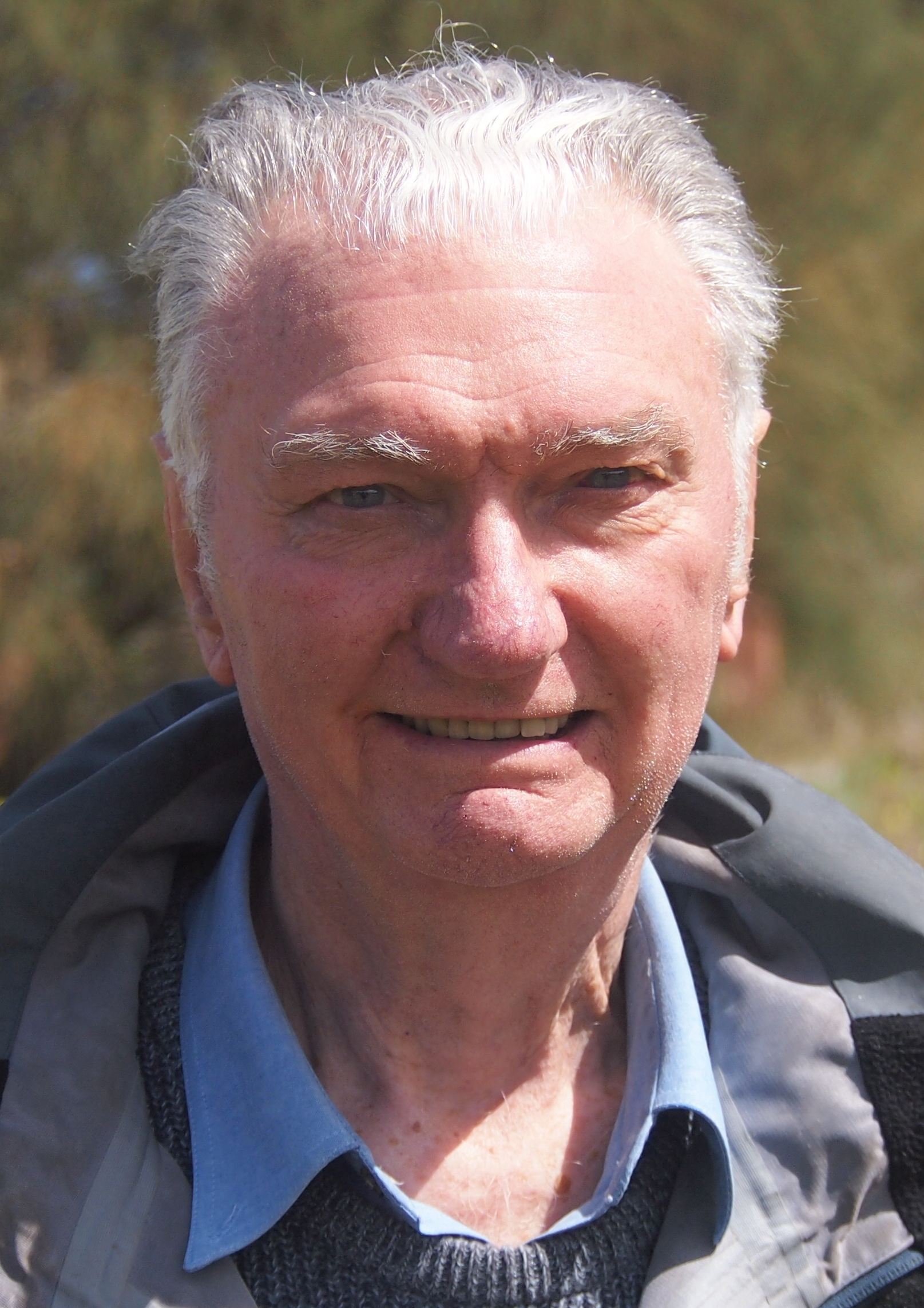
Dr Victor Gostin. 2017

Victor A. Gostin (born 1940) is an Australian geologist, who discovered in the Flinders Ranges of South Australia, a deposit of volcanic material that was ejected from the 300-kilometre distant Acraman crater when the impact was created by a meteorite some 580 million years ago. He is an associate professor at the University of Adelaide, Department of Earth Sciences, School of Physical Sciences.

== Discovery ==
His discovery was linked to a previous discovery by George Williams, also of the University of Adelaide, that the Acraman crater in Lake Acraman was due to the impact of a superbolide (exceptionally large meteor). After Gostin learned about this, he, Williams, Peter Haines and other colleagues of the University of Adelaide studied the materials in both places and found that they were similar in lithology and fracturing, showing that the ejecta in the Flinders Ranges came from the Lake Acraman site. This collaborative study was announced by them on 9 July 1985 during the Adelaide Geosyncline Informal Research Symposium in the Department of Geology and Geophysics, University of Adelaide. Gostin remarked that his discovery "was the first known occurrence of far-flung ejected blocks of impact origin that have been preserved on earth."

== Awards and honors ==
Main-belt asteroid 3640 Gostin, which was named in honor of Gostin, was discovered by Carolyn and Eugene Shoemaker at the Palomar Observatory. The citation reads as follows:

Named in honour of Victor A. Gostin, geologist on the faculty of the University of Adelaide, South Australia. A specialist in sedimentology and stratigraphy, Gostin discovered in the Flinders Ranges of South Australia a deposit of shocked debris ejected from the Lake Acraman impact structure about 300 km to the west. His careful studies of this ancient deposit have provided the first detailed picture of the distant ejecta from a known large terrestrial impact crater.

In 2011, Gostin was also awarded the Bruce Webb Medal of the SA Division of the Geological Society of Australia for "his major contributions to Earth Sciences education and various aspects of geology, including environmental geology, marine geology, planetology and sedimentology over the last forty years."

== Personal life ==
Gostin is an active member of the Theosophical Society in Australia and edits the e-newsletter Theosophy and Science.

== See also ==
- 3640 Gostin
- List of impact craters on Earth § Largest craters
