= Rake (theatre) =

Upward slope of a theater stage or audience seating

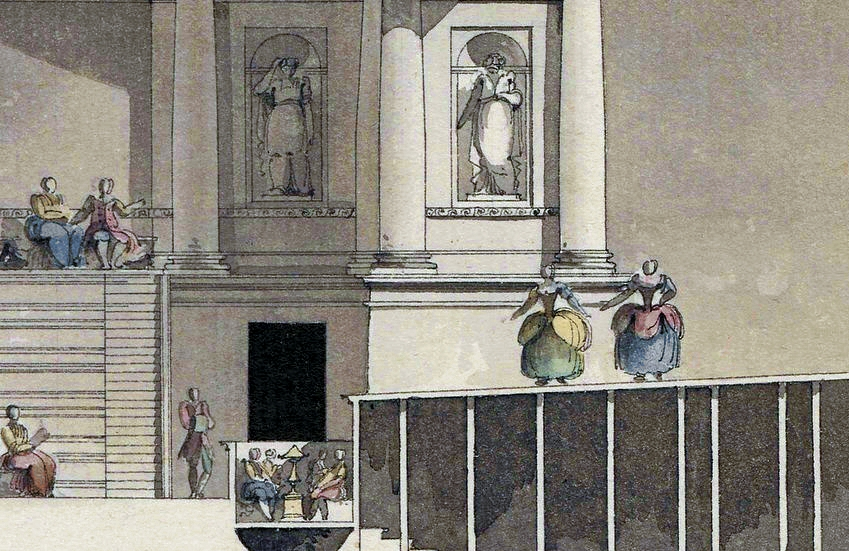
The raked stage (in section, right) of the 18th century Hermitage Theatre in St Petersburg

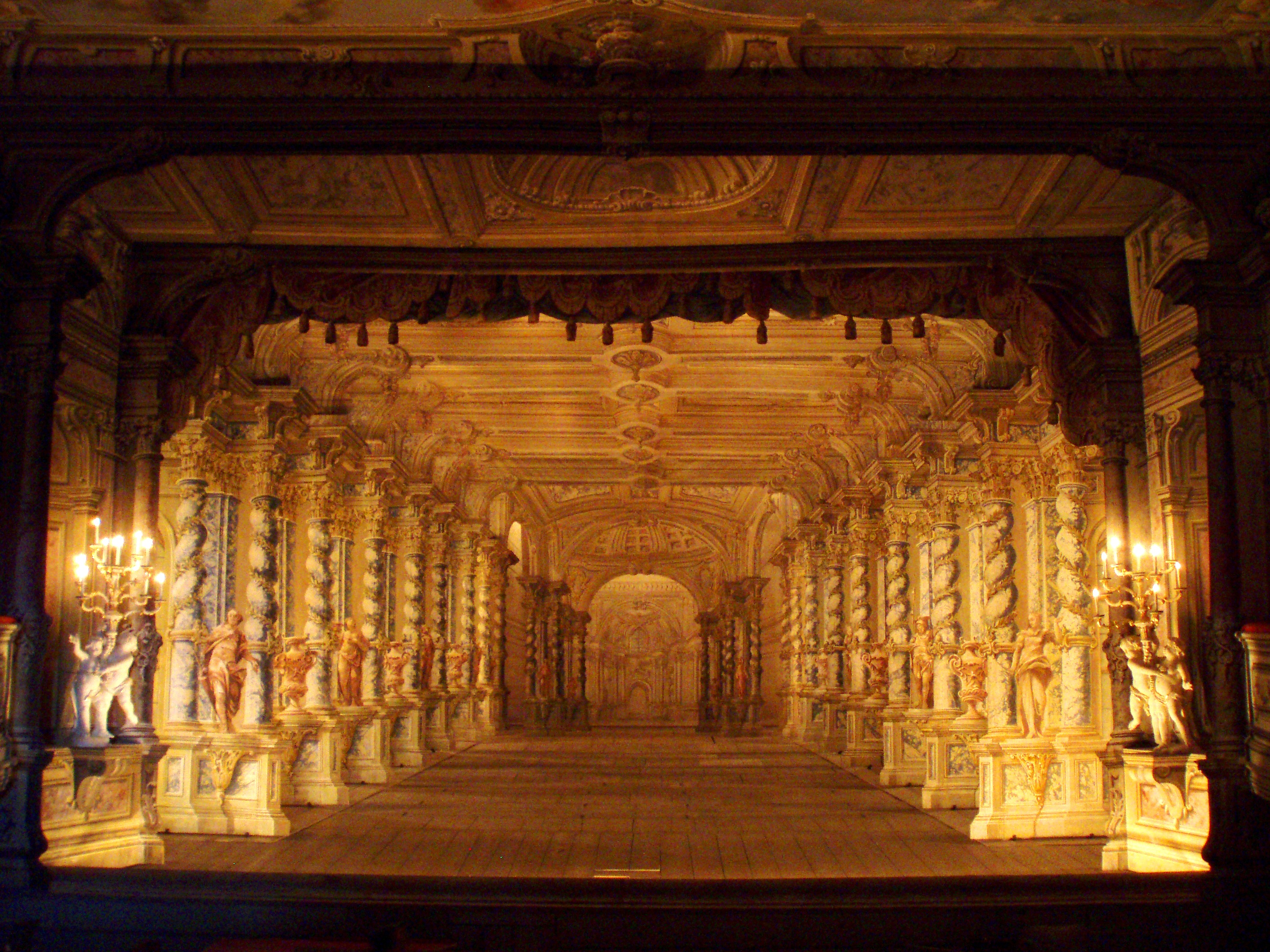
Illusion of perspective at the 17th-century theatre in Český Krumlov Castle, Czech Republic. The stalls' floor is level

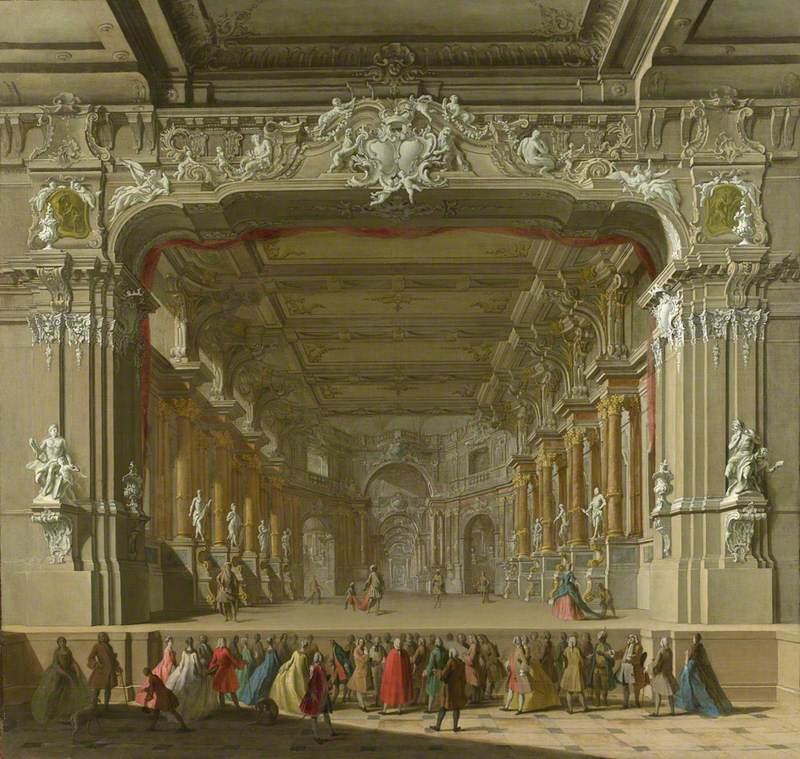
Stage design, showing rake and perspective, from the Bibiena school, northern Italy

A rake or raked stage is a theatre stage that slopes upwards, away from the audience. Such a design was typical of English theatre in the Middle Ages and early Modern era, and improves the view and sound for spectators. It also helps with the illusion of perspective. When features of the scenery are made to align with a notional vanishing point beyond the rear of the stage, the rake supports the illusion. These elements of scenery are termed raking pieces.

Raked seating refers to seating which is positioned on an upwards slope away from the stage, in order to give those in the audience at the back a better view than if the seats were all on the same level.

== Calculating incline ==
The slope of the rake is measured by the number of horizontal units it takes for one vertical unit measured in the direction of the slope, or by the equivalent percentage. A rake of one horizontal unit to one vertical unit (1 in 1, or a 100% slope) would give an angle of 45° from the horizontal. Rakes of 1 in 18 (5.56%) to 1 in 48 (2.08%) were more common.

Converting the rake ratio to an angle requires the application of some basic trigonometry. The angle in degrees = arctan(vertical/horizontal), where "vertical" is the vertical rise in distance and "horizontal" is the horizontal distance over which this rise occurs. For example, for a rake of 1:18, the corresponding angle is arctan(1/18) = 3.18°.

== History ==
Theatres constructed after the beginning of the 20th century feature a raked audience section. This change back to the method of construction seen in Greek and Roman theaters (flat stage and terraced audience) was effected due to the difficulty encountered when one tries to walk across a sloped surface, which had resulted in unnatural movement patterns to avoid the appearance of limping caused by the non-level surface.

Raked stages can still be seen in some opera, Broadway and West End productions, where a temporary raked acting surface is built over a theatre's permanent flat stage. Creating a raked stage can also assist set designs which are designed with forced perspective.

== Upstaging ==
On a raked stage an actor who is further from the audience is higher than an actor who is closer to the audience. This led to the theatre positions "upstage" and "downstage", meaning, respectively, farther from or closer to the audience.

The term "upstaging" refers to one actor moving to a more elevated position on the rake (stage), causing the upstaged actor (who stays more downstage, closer to the audience) to turn their back to the audience to address the cast member. The term "upstaging" has since taken on the figurative meaning of an actor unscrupulously drawing the audience's attention away from another actor.
