= Acraman Creek Conservation Park =

Protected area in South Australia

- IUCN category VI (protected area with sustainable use of natural resources)
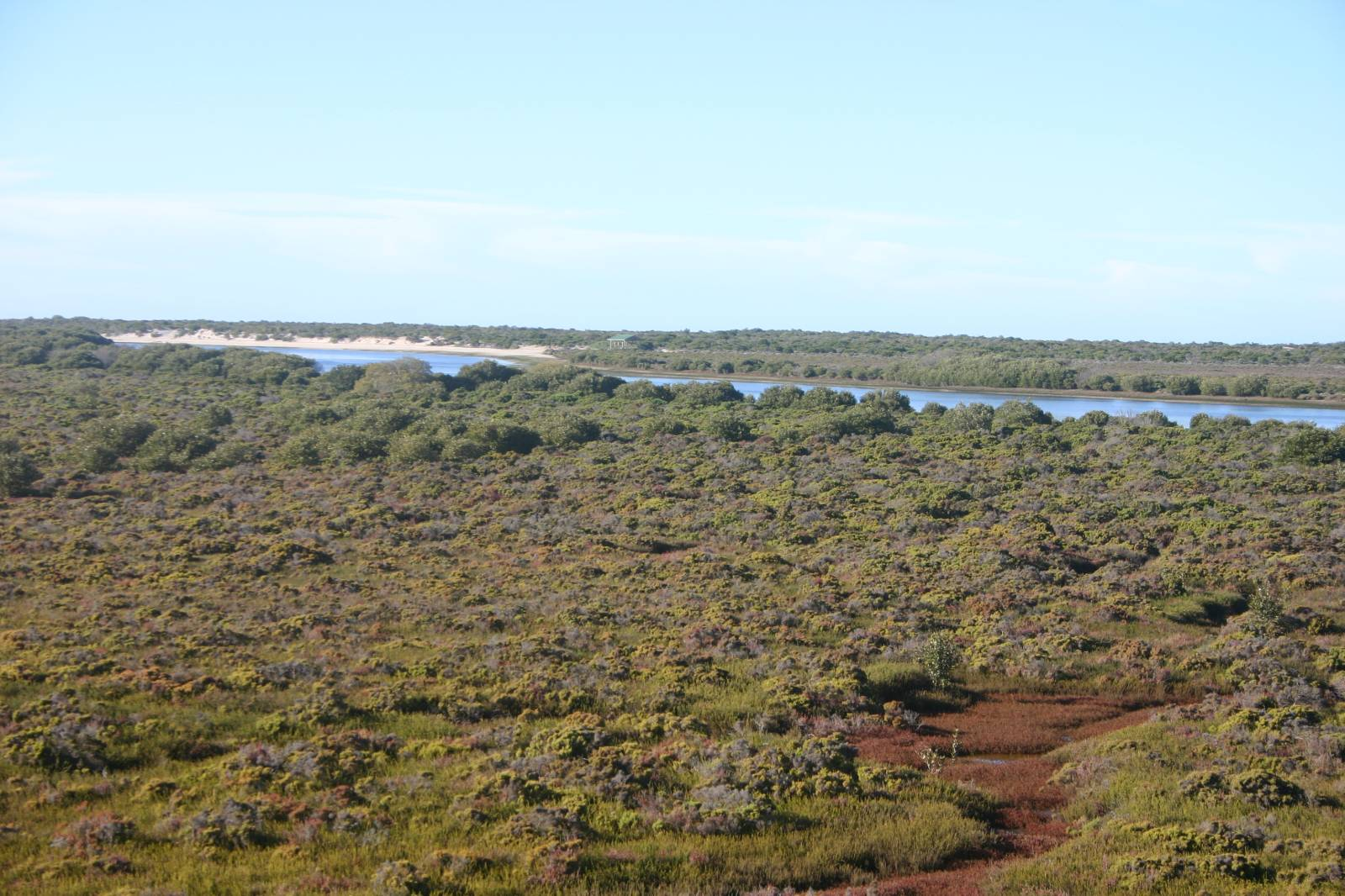
- Acraman Creek estuary

- Location within South Australia
- Location: South Australia
- Nearest city: Smoky Bay
- Coordinates: 32°27′06″S 134°04′01″E
- Area: 39.53 km^{2} (15.26 sq mi)
- Established: 12 September 1991
- Governing body: Department for Environment and Water
- Website: http://www.environment.sa.gov.au/parks/Find_a_Park/Browse_by_region/Eyre_Peninsula/Acraman_Creek_Conservation_Park

Acraman Creek Conservation Park is a protected area located in South Australia on the northern side of Streaky Bay on the western side of the Eyre Peninsula, about halfway between the towns of Ceduna and Streaky Bay.

The conservation park occupies land in Allotments 10 and 11 of Deposited Plan No. 30252 in the cadastral units of the Hundreds of Wallanippie and Haslam. It was proclaimed on 12 September 1991 under the National Parks and Wildlife Act 1972 with its name being derived from Acraman Creek, a stream located within its boundaries. As of 2018, it covered an area of 39.53 square kilometres (15.26 sq mi).

It contains the Acraman Creek estuary, ocean beaches, sand dunes, mangrove, samphire and mallee habitats. It is an important feeding location for many coastal birds, including migratory waders such as sandpipers and stilts that journey from the Arctic Circle.

A bush camping ground and the ocean beach is accessible by conventional vehicles, but access to boat launching facilities at Port Lindsey on Acraman Creek requires a four-wheel drive. Slightly offshore is the remains of a shipwreck when whaling was performed in the area.

Activities in the conservation park include bush camping (permit required), fishing, boating, canoeing and birdwatching.

The conservation park is classified as an IUCN Category VI protected area. During the 1990s, the conservation park were listed on the former Register of the National Estate.

== See also ==
- Protected areas of South Australia
- John Acraman
