= Meanings of minor-planet names: 3001–4000 =

== 3001–3100 ==
Named minor planet	Provisional	This minor planet was named for...	Ref · Catalog
3001 Michelangelo	1982 BC_{1}	Michelangelo (1475–1564), Italian sculptor, painter, architect, and poet of the High Renaissance	MPC · 3001
3002 Delasalle	1982 FB_{3}	Jean-Baptiste de La Salle (1651–1719), French priest, educational reformer, and founder of the Institute of the Brothers of the Christian Schools	MPC · 3002
3003 Konček	1983 YH	Mikuláš Konček (1900–1982), Slovak meteorologist who founded of the Meteorological Institute in Bratislava	MPC · 3003
3004 Knud	1976 DD	Knud Rasmussen (1879–1933), Greenlandic/Danish polar explorer and anthropologist, who has been called the "father of Eskimology"	MPC · 3004
3005 Pervictoralex	1979 QK_{2}	Per Victor Alexander Lagerkvist, son of Swedish discoverer Claes-Ingvar Lagerkvist	MPC · 3005
3006 Livadia	1979 SF_{11}	Livadiya, a suburb of Yalta on the coast of the Crimean Peninsula	MPC · 3006
3007 Reaves	1979 UC	Gibson Reaves, American astronomer, historian and educator at the University of Southern California	MPC · 3007
3008 Nojiri	1938 WA	Hōei Nojiri (1885–1977) Japanese essayist, author and astronomer	MPC · 3008
3009 Coventry	1973 SM_{2}	Coventry, England, sister city of Volgograd	MPC · 3009
3010 Ushakov	1978 SB_{5}	Fyodor Ushakov (1745–1817), Russian admiral	MPC · 3010
3011 Chongqing	1978 WM_{14}	Chongqing, China	MPC · 3011
3012 Minsk	1979 QU_{9}	Minsk, Byelorussian SSR	MPC · 3012
3013 Dobrovoleva	1979 SD_{7}	Oleg Vasilyevich Dobrovolsky, Soviet astronomer known for his cometary studies. He was the head of the Cometary Astronomy Department of the Institute of Astrophysics of the Tadjik S.S.R. Academy of Sciences in Dushanbe.	MPC · 3013
3014 Huangsushu	1979 TM	Su-Shu Huang (1915–1977), Chinese-American astrophysicist known for his studies on circumstellar habitable zones and prerequisites of extraterrestrial life	MPC · 3014
3015 Candy	1980 VN	Michael P. Candy (1928–1994), British astrometrist and discoverer of minor planets and comets. Director of the Royal Greenwich Observatory and Perth Observatory. President of IAU Commission VI.	MPC · 3015
3016 Meuse	1981 EK	The Meuse River (Dutch Maas), which rises in France and flows through Belgium and the Netherlands	MPC · 3016
3017 Petrovič	1981 UL	Štefan Petrovič (1906–?), Slovak climatologist	MPC · 3017
3018 Godiva	1982 KM	Lady Godiva (died ca. 1076), medieval Anglo-Saxon noblewoman and church patron, wife of Leofric, Earl of Mercia	MPC · 3018
3019 Kulin	1940 AC	György Kulin (1905–1989), Hungarian astronomer	MPC · 3019
3020 Naudts	1949 PR	Ignace Naudts (1949–1992), Belgian amateur astronomer	MPC · 3020
3021 Lucubratio	1967 CB	Latin for "nocturnal study, night work" (from lucubrum, candle)	MPC · 3021
3022 Dobermann	1980 SH	Karl Friedrich Louis Dobermann (1834–1894), German zoologist and amateur astronomer known for breeding the Dobermann	MPC · 3022
3023 Heard	1981 JS	John Frederick Heard (1907–1976), Canadian astronomer, professor of astronomy at the University of Toronto and fourth director of the David Dunlap Observatory	MPC · 3023
3024 Hainan	1981 UW_{9}	Hainan Province	MPC · 3024
3025 Higson	1982 QR	Roger Higson, American night assistant for the 1.2-meter Samuel Oschin telescope at Palomar Observatory in California. His supportive work has been appreciated by observers of comets and minor planets.	MPC · 3025
3026 Sarastro	1977 TA_{1}	Sarastro, high priest of the Temple of Wisdom in Mozart's The Magic Flute	MPC · 3026
3027 Shavarsh	1978 PQ_{2}	Shavarsh Karapetyan (born 1953), Soviet–Armenian champion and world-record finswimmer, who saved 20 lives from drowning when a trolleybus fell into the Yerevan Lake.	MPC · 3027
3028 Zhangguoxi	1978 TA_{2}	Zhang Guoxi, Chinese industrialist and philanthropist	MPC · 3028
3029 Sanders	1981 EA_{8}	Jeffrey D. Sanders, American astronomer who participated in the Palomar Planet-Crossing Asteroid Survey as an undergraduate student	MPC · 3029
3030 Vehrenberg	1981 EH_{16}	Hans Vehrenberg, German amateur astronomer from Düsseldorf. He is the author of the Atlas of Deep-Sky Splendors (German: Mein Messier-Buch). For researchers on minor planets and comets, he published the "Falkauer Atlas" and "Atlas Stellarum".	MPC · 3030
3031 Houston	1984 CX	Walter Scott Houston (1912–1993), American amateur astronomer well known for his column Deep Sky Wonders in Sky & Telescope	MPC · 3031
3032 Evans	1984 CA_{1}	Reverend Robert O. Evans, Australian amateur astronomer, discoverer of several extragalactic supernovae	MPC · 3032
3033 Holbaek	1984 EJ	Holbæk, Denmark, town nearest to the discovery site (Brorfelde Observatoriet) on the occasion of the former's 700th anniversary in 1986	MPC · 3033
3034 Climenhaga	A917 SE	John L. Climenhaga (1916–2008), Canadian astronomer and father of journalist David Climenhaga (Src/Src)	MPC · 3034
3035 Chambers	A924 EJ	John Eric Chambers (born 1969), then British predoctoral fellow at the Harvard-Smithsonian Center for Astrophysics	MPC · 3035
3036 Krat	1937 TO	Vladimir Krat (1911–1983), Russian astronomer	MPC · 3036
3037 Alku	1944 BA	Finnish for "Beginning", the discoverer's boyhood boat, built by his father	MPC · 3037
3038 Bernes	1978 QB_{3}	Mark Bernes (1911–1969), Soviet film actor and singer	MPC · 3038
3039 Yangel	1978 SP_{2}	Mikhail Yangel (1911–1971), leading Soviet rocket and missile designer	MPC · 3039
3040 Kozai	1979 BA	Yoshihide Kozai (1928–2018), Japanese astronomer and celestial mechanician, discoverer of the Kozai mechanism	MPC · 3040
3041 Webb	1980 GD	Rev. Thomas William Webb (1807–1885), British astronomer, author of Celestial Objects for Common Telescopes and discoverer of S Orionis	MPC · 3041
3042 Zelinsky	1981 EF_{10}	David S. Zelinsky, American mathematician at Brown University, formerly active participant in the Palomar Planet-Crossing Asteroid Survey while an undergraduate student at Caltech	MPC · 3042
3043 San Diego	1982 SA	San Diego, California, in recognition of its efforts to curb light pollution	MPC · 3043
3044 Saltykov	1983 RE_{3}	Nikita Saltykov (1893–1946), Russian farmer and grandfather of Natal'ja Vital'evna Metlova who co-discovered this minor planet	MPC · 3044
3045 Alois	1984 AW	Alois T. Stuczynski, grandfather of American astronomer Joe Wagner who discovered this minor planet	MPC · 3045
3046 Molière	4120 P-L	Molière (1622–1673), French playwright	MPC · 3046
3047 Goethe	6091 P-L	Johann Wolfgang von Goethe (1749–1832), German poet and playwright	MPC · 3047
3048 Guangzhou	1964 TH_{1}	Guangzhou, Guangdong, China	MPC · 3048
3049 Kuzbass	1968 FH	The coal mining Kuznets Basin, located in the Kemerovo Region of Siberia, one of the richest coal deposits in the world	MPC · 3049
3050 Carrera	1972 NW	The four brothers of the Carrera family: Javiera (1781–1862), Juan José (1782–1818), José Miguel (1785–1821), and Luis (1791–1818), key figures of the Chilean War of Independence	MPC · 3050
3051 Nantong	1974 YP	Nantong, Jiangsu, China	MPC · 3051
3052 Herzen	1976 YJ_{3}	Alexander Herzen (1812–1870), Russian revolutionary, writer, and philosopher, "father of Russian socialism" and founder of the free Russian press abroad	MPC · 3052
3053 Dresden	1977 QS	The German city of Dresden	MPC · 3053
3054 Strugatskia	1977 RE_{7}	The brothers Arkady and Boris Strugatsky (1925–1991, 1933–2012) Russian science fiction writers	MPC · 3054
3055 Annapavlova	1978 TR_{3}	Anna Pavlova (1881–1931), Russian prima ballerina best known for her performance of The Dying Swan	MPC · 3055
3056 INAG	1978 VD_{1}	The French National Institute of Astronomy and Geophysics (French: Institut national d'astronomie et de géophysique; INAG), which built the discovery telescope	MPC · 3056
3057 Mälaren	1981 EG	Lake Mälaren, Sweden	MPC · 3057
3058 Delmary	1981 EO_{17}	Delmary Rose Schanz (born 1938), American artist	MPC · 3058
3059 Pryor	1981 EF_{23}	Carlton P. Pryor, American astronomer who participated in the Palomar Planet-Crossing Asteroid Survey while an undergraduate student at Caltech	MPC · 3059
3060 Delcano	1982 RD_{1}	Juan Sebastián Elcano or del Caño (1476–1526), Spanish navigator, lieutenant of Magellan, first to continuously circumnavigate the globe	MPC · 3060
3061 Cook	1982 UB_{1}	James Cook (1728–1779), British explorer and navigator	MPC · 3061
3062 Wren	1982 XC	Sir Christopher Wren (1632–1723), British architect and astronomer	MPC · 3062
3063 Makhaon	1983 PV	Makhaon, mythical medical doctor to Greeks during the Trojan War	MPC · 3063
3064 Zimmer	1984 BB_{1}	Louis Zimmer (1888–1970), Belgian amateur astronomer and clockmaker to the King of Belgium	MPC · 3064
3065 Sarahill	1984 CV	Sarah J. Hill, professor of astronomy and chairman of the astronomy department at Wellesley College	MPC · 3065
3066 McFadden	1984 EO	Lucy-Ann McFadden (born 1953), American astronomer and planetary scientist	MPC · 3066
3067 Akhmatova	1982 TE_{2}	Anna Akhmatova (1889–1966), Soviet poet	MPC · 3067
3068 Khanina	1982 YJ_{1}	Frida Borisovna Khanina, Soviet orbit computer and long-time member of the Institute for Theoretical Astronomy	MPC · 3068
3069 Heyrovský	1982 UG_{2}	Jaroslav Heyrovský (1890–1967), Czech physical chemist	MPC · 3069
3070 Aitken	1949 GK	Robert Grant Aitken (1864–1951), American astronomer, fourth director of the Lick Observatory, and author of the "New General Catalogue of Double Stars within 12° of the North Pole" (1932)	MPC · 3070
3071 Nesterov	1973 FT_{1}	Pyotr Nesterov (1887–1914), Russian pioneer airman	MPC · 3071
3072 Vilnius	1978 RS_{1}	Vilnius, Lithuania	MPC · 3072
3073 Kursk	1979 SW_{11}	Kursk, Russia	MPC · 3073
3074 Popov	1979 YE_{9}	Alexander Stepanovich Popov (1859–1906), Russian radio inventor	MPC · 3074
3075 Bornmann	1981 EY_{15}	Patricia L. Bornmann, American solar astronomer who participated in the Palomar Planet-Crossing Asteroid Survey while an undergraduate student at Caltech	MPC · 3075
3076 Garber	1982 RB_{1}	Paul E. Garber (1899–1992), American historian and first head of the National Air Museum of the Smithsonian Institution, in Washington, D.C.	MPC · 3076
3077 Henderson	1982 SK	Thomas Henderson (1798–1844), Scottish astronomer, mathematician, and first Astronomer Royal for Scotland. In 1839 he was the first person to measure the distance Alpha Centauri	MPC · 3077
3078 Horrocks	1984 FG	Jeremiah Horrocks (1619–1641), also known as Jeremiah Horrox, English astronomer and mathematician who predicted and was the first to observe the transit of Venus in 1639. He also demonstrated that the Moon moved around the Earth in an elliptical orbit.	MPC · 3078
3079 Schiller	2578 P-L	Friedrich Schiller (1759–1805), German playwright	MPC · 3079
3080 Moisseiev	1935 TE	Nikolay Moiseyev (1902–1955), Soviet astronomer and an expert in celestial mechanics	MPC · 3080
3081 Martinůboh	1971 UP	Bohuslav Martinů (1890–1959), Czech composer of modern classical music	MPC · 3081
3082 Dzhalil	1972 KE	Musa Cälil (Musa Mustafovich Dzhalil'; 1906–1944), Tatar Soviet poet and resistance fighter	MPC · 3082
3083 OAFA	1974 MH	Félix Aguilar Observatory in Argentina	MPC · 3083
3084 Kondratyuk	1977 QB_{1}	Yuri Kondratyuk (1897–1942), Soviet engineer, mathematician and pioneer of astronautics and spaceflight	MPC · 3084
3085 Donna	1980 DA	Donna Marie Thompson, American administrative assistant for the Minor Planet Center and the Central Bureau for Astronomical Telegrams, secretary for the Planetary Sciences division of the Harvard-Smithsonian Center for Astrophysics	MPC · 3085
3086 Kalbaugh	1980 XE	Carroll Kalbaugh Liller, father of Chilean astronomer William Liller	MPC · 3086
3087 Beatrice Tinsley	1981 QJ_{1}	Beatrice Tinsley (1941–1981), British-born New Zealand astronomer and cosmologist	MPC · 3087
3088 Jinxiuzhonghua	1981 UX_{9}	"Splendid China", park at Shenzhen, the largest miniature scenic spot in the world	MPC · 3088
3089 Oujianquan	1981 XK_{2}	Ou Jianquan, Chinese entrepreneur, for his notable contributions developing township enterprises	MPC · 3089
3090 Tjossem	1982 AN	The Tjossem family of central Washington State, four generations of whose members have been friends of the discoverer and his family (in particular Peter Tjossem, 19th–20th-century amateur entomologist and paleobotanist)	MPC · 3090
3091 van den Heuvel	6081 P-L	Ed van den Heuvel (born 1940), Dutch astronomer, and his niece Julia Edith van den Heuvel	MPC · 3091
3092 Herodotus	6550 P-L	Herodotus (c. 484 BC – c. 425 BC), Greek historian, "Father of Historiography"	MPC · 3092
3093 Bergholz	1971 MG	Olga Bergholz (1910–1975), Soviet poet	MPC · 3093
3094 Chukokkala	1979 FE_{2}	Korney Chukovsky (1882–1969), pen name of Nikolaj Kornejchukov, one of the most popular children's poets in the Russian language	MPC · 3094
3095 Omarkhayyam	1980 RT_{2}	Omar Khayyam (1048–1131), Persian astronomer, mathematician and philosopher	MPC · 3095
3096 Bezruč	1981 QC_{1}	Petr Bezruč (1867–1958), Czech poet	MPC · 3096
3097 Tacitus	2011 P-L	Tacitus (c. 56–120), Roman historian	MPC · 3097
3098 van Sprang	4579 P-L	Bert van Sprang (1944–2015), Dutch meteor specialist	MPC · 3098
3099 Hergenrother	1940 GF	Carl W. Hergenrother (born 1973), American astronomer and discoverer of minor planets	MPC · 3099
3100 Zimmerman	1977 EQ_{1}	Nikolaj Vladimirovich Zimmerman (1890–1942), Russian astronomer at Pulkovo Observatory and professor at Leningrad University, known for his astrometric observations and his compilations of star catalogs	MPC · 3100

== 3101–3200 ==
back to top

Named minor planet	Provisional	This minor planet was named for...	Ref · Catalog
3101 Goldberger	1978 GB	Marvin Leonard Goldberger (1922–2014), American physicist, teacher and humanitarian, president of the California Institute of Technology, to commemorate his birthday, October 22	MPC · 3101
3102 Krok	1981 QA	Krok (Libuše), mythical Slavonic prince	MPC · 3102
3103 Eger	1982 BB	Eger a small town NE of Budapest, at one time the sixth largest town in Hungary, known for its medieval streets, castle, and red wine (Bull's Blood)	MPC · 3103
3104 Dürer	1982 BB_{1}	Albrecht Dürer (1471–1528), German master painter, woodcutter, engraver, and scholar	MPC · 3104
3105 Stumpff	A907 PB	Karl Stumpff (1895–1970), German celestial mechanician and professor of astronomy, pioneer of Fast Fourier Analysis, author of the three-volume Himmelsmechanik	MPC · 3105
3106 Morabito	1981 EE	Linda A. Morabito (born 1953), Education Programs Manager at the Planetary Society	MPC · 3106
3107 Weaver	1981 JG_{2}	Kenneth Weaver (1915–2010), American senior assistant editor for science of the National Geographic magazine	MPC · 3107
3108 Lyubov	1972 QM	Lyubov Orlova (1902–1975), actress and star of Soviet cinema	MPC · 3108
3109 Machin	1974 DC	Arnold Machin (1911–1999), British sculptor	MPC · 3109
3110 Wagman	1975 SC	Nicholas E. Wagman (1905–1980), American astronomer and astrometrist	MPC · 3110
3111 Misuzu	1977 DX_{8}	Nickname of Shinano Province, now Nagano Prefecture, Japan, the discovery site	MPC · 3111
3112 Velimir	1977 QC_{5}	Velimir (Viktor Vladimirovitch) Khlebnikov, 19th–20th-century Russian poet	MPC · 3112
3113 Chizhevskij	1978 RO	Aleksandr Leonidovich Chizhevskij, 20th-century Soviet biologist, one of the founders of heliobiology	MPC · 3113
3114 Ercilla	1980 FB_{12}	Don Alonso de Ercilla y Zúñiga, 16th-century Spanish poet and soldier, who distinguished himself in the campaign in Chile against the Araucanians, inspiration for the epic poem La Araucana	MPC · 3114
3115 Baily	1981 PL	Francis Baily, 18th–19th-century English astronomer, one of the founders of the Royal Astronomical Society, and namesake of Baily's beads	MPC · 3115
3116 Goodricke	1983 CF	John Goodricke, 18th-century Dutch-English deaf-mute astronomer, who identified Algol as an eclipsing variable and discovered δ Cephei	MPC · 3116
3117 Niépce	1983 CM_{1}	Joseph Nicéphore Niépce, 18th–19th-century French photography pioneer	MPC · 3117
3118 Claytonsmith	1974 OD	Clayton Albert Smith (1934–1993), American astrometrist, director of the Yale-Columbia Southern Observatory and later the United States Naval Observatory's astrometry department	MPC · 3118
3119 Dobronravin	1972 YX	Petr Pavlovich Dobronravin, Russian astrophysicist and spectroscopist, deputy director of the Crimean Astrophysical Observatory 1952–1969	MPC · 3119
3120 Dangrania	1979 RZ	Daniil Aleksandrovich Granin, 20th-century Russian writer	MPC · 3120
3121 Tamines	1981 EV	Tamines, Belgium, now called (Sambreville)	MPC · 3121
3122 Florence	1981 ET_{3}	Florence Nightingale, English nurse and hospital reformer	MPC · 3122
3123 Dunham	1981 QF_{2}	David W. Dunham, American astronomer, organizer of the International Occultation Timing Association	MPC · 3123
3124 Kansas	1981 VB	Kansas, United States, the discoverer's home state, and also the University of Kansas, the discoverer's alma mater, to commemorate the centennial of observational astronomy there, which began with the purchase of an Alvan Clark 6-inch refractor in 1885	MPC · 3124
3125 Hay	1982 BJ_{1}	William Thompson Hay (1888–1949), British music-hall comedian, film star of the 1930s and early 1940s, and amateur astronomer, (re)discoverer of Saturn's Great White Spot in 1933	MPC · 3125
3126 Davydov	1969 TP_{1}	Denis Vasil'evich Davydov (1784–1839), Russian officer, writer and poet, hero of the Patriotic War of 1812	MPC · 3126
3127 Bagration	1973 ST_{4}	Petr Ivanovich Bagration, 18th–19th-century Russian (of Georgian descent) general, hero of the Patriotic War of 1812 who died at the Battle of Borodino	MPC · 3127
3128 Obruchev	1979 FJ_{2}	Vladimir Afanasjevich Obruchev, 19th–20th-century Russian geologist, geographer, and author of popular books on science and science-fiction novels	MPC · 3128
3129 Bonestell	1979 MK_{2}	Chesley Bonestell, American space artist. Named by discoverer E. F. Helin from suggestion by Ronald Paludan	MPC · 3129
3130 Hillary	1981 YO	Sir Edmund Hillary, British mountaineer	MPC · 3130
3131 Mason-Dixon	1982 BM_{1}	Charles Mason and Jeremiah Dixon, 18th-century British astronomers who observed the 1761 transit of Venus from the Cape of Good Hope, and later (1763–1767) surveyed the boundary between Pennsylvania and Maryland, the Mason–Dixon line	MPC · 3131
3132 Landgraf	1940 WL	Werner Landgraf, German astronomer, who established the orbit (and whose initials appear in the provisional designation)	MPC · 3132
3133 Sendai	A907 TC	Sendai, Japan, the "Heidelberg of the East" (this object was discovered from Heidelberg) and the Sendai Municipal Astronomical Observatory	MPC · 3133
3134 Kostinsky	A921 VA	Sergej Konstantinovich Kostinsky (1867–1936), Russian astronomer, after whom the "Kostinsky effect" is named	MPC · 3134
3135 Lauer	1981 EC_{9}	Tod R. Lauer, American astronomer, who participated in the Palomar Planet-Crossing Asteroid Survey while an undergraduate student at Caltech	MPC · 3135
3136 Anshan	1981 WD_{4}	Anshan, Liaoning, China	MPC · 3136
3137 Horky	1982 SM_{1}	Czech hill, site of Antonín Mrkos' first telescope	MPC · 3137
3138 Ciney	1980 KL	Ciney, Belgium, chief town of the Condroz, where the discoverer maintains a residence	MPC · 3138
3139 Shantou	1980 VL_{1}	Shantou, Guangdong, China	MPC · 3139
3140 Stellafane	1983 AO	Stellafane, the annual Vermont star party organized by the "Springfield Telescope Makers"	MPC · 3140
3141 Buchar	1984 RH	Emil Buchar (1901–1979), Czech discoverer of minor planets and pioneer of satellite geodesy	MPC · 3141
3142 Kilopi	1937 AC	Kilopi, or 1000 × π, which rounds off to 3142, the number assigned to this minor planet	MPC · 3142
3143 Genecampbell	1980 UA	I. Gene Campbell, American systems programmer in the central computing facility at the Harvard-Smithsonian Center for Astrophysics	MPC · 3143
3144 Brosche	1931 TY_{1}	Peter Brosche (born 1936), German astronomer	MPC · 3144
3145 Walter Adams	1955 RY	Walter Sydney Adams, 19th–20th-century American astronomer, director of the Mount Wilson Observatory (1923–1946), whose spectroscopic studies led to the discovery, with Ernst Arnold Kohlschütter, of the spectroscopic method for determining parallax, and who identified Sirius B as the first white-dwarf star known	MPC · 3145
3146 Dato	1972 KG	Dato Kratsashvili (1963–1980), young Georgian painter	MPC · 3146
3147 Samantha	1976 YU_{3}	Samantha Smith, 20th-century American schoolgirl who became "America's Youngest Ambassador"	MPC · 3147
3148 Grechko	1979 SA_{12}	Georgii Mikhailovich Grechko, Soviet cosmonaut and scientist	MPC · 3148
3149 Okudzhava	1981 SH	Bulat Okudzhava, Russian (of Georgian descent) writer, poet and songwriter	MPC · 3149
3150 Tosa	1983 CB	Tosa Province (Ancient name of Kōchi Prefecture), Japan, the discoverer's place of residence	MPC · 3150
3151 Talbot	1983 HF	Henry Fox Talbot (1800–1877), British inventor and pioneer of photography	MPC · 3151
3152 Jones	1983 LF	Albert F. A. L. Jones (1920–2013), New Zealand amateur astronomer	MPC · 3152
3153 Lincoln	1984 SH_{3}	Abraham Lincoln (1809–1865), 16th American President of the United States	MPC · 3153
3154 Grant	1984 SO_{3}	Ulysses S. Grant (1822–1885), 18th American President of the United States	MPC · 3154
3155 Lee	1984 SP_{3}	Robert E. Lee (1807–1870), American general and commander of the Confederate Army of Northern Virginia in the American Civil War	MPC · 3155
3156 Ellington	1953 EE	Duke Ellington (1899–1974), American musician	MPC · 3156
3157 Novikov	1973 SX_{3}	Alexei Ivanovich Novikov (1916–1986), Soviet aviator and poet	MPC · 3157
3158 Anga	1976 SU_{2}	Siberian village, birthplace of Russian ethnographers Ivan Evseevich Venyaminov and Afanasij Prokopevich Shchapov	MPC · 3158
3159 Prokofʹev	1976 US_{2}	Vladimir Prokofiev (1898–1993), Russian spectroscopist	MPC · 3159
3160 Angerhofer	1980 LE	Phillip Edward Angerhofer (1950–1986), American astronomer and astrophysicist at USNO	MPC · 3160
3161 Beadell	1980 TB_{5}	Len Beadell (1923–1995), Australian surveyor	MPC · 3161
3162 Nostalgia	1980 YH	Nostalgia, a sentimentality for the past	MPC · 3162
3163 Randi	1981 QM	James Randi (1928–2020), Canadian-American magician and science skeptic, who debunked numerous paranormal and pseudoscientific claims	MPC · 3163
3164 Prast	6562 P-L	Martin Prast, American citizen and war veteran	MPC · 3164
3165 Mikawa	1984 QE	Mikawa Province (Ancient name of eastern half of Aichi Prefecture), Japan	MPC · 3165
3166 Klondike	1940 FG	The brothers Karl F. Joutsen and Anton F. Johnson, who made a fortune in the Klondike Gold Rush	MPC · 3166
3167 Babcock	1955 RS	Horace W. Babcock (1912–2003) and his father Harold D. Babcock (1882–1968), American astronomers	MPC · 3167
3168 Lomnický Štít	1980 XM	Lomnický Štít, Slovak meteorological and solar observatory	MPC · 3168
3169 Ostro	1981 LA	Steven Jeffrey Ostro (1946–2008), American radar astronomer	MPC · 3169
3170 Dzhanibekov	1979 SS_{11}	Vladimir Dzhanibekov (born 1942), Soviet cosmonaut	MPC · 3170
3171 Wangshouguan	1979 WO	Shou-Guan Wang (Wang Shouguan), Chinese astronomer and honorary president of the Chinese Astronomical Society	MPC · 3171
3172 Hirst	1981 WW	William Parkinson Hirst, South African astronomer and orbit computer	MPC · 3172
3173 McNaught	1981 WY	Robert McNaught (born 1956), British astronomer and discoverer of minor planets	MPC · 3173
3174 Alcock	1984 UV	George Alcock (1912–2000), British comet and nova hunter	MPC · 3174
3175 Netto	1979 YP	Edgar Rangel Netto, Brazilian astronomer	MPC · 3175
3176 Paolicchi	1980 VR_{1}	Paolo Paolicchi, Italian astrophysicist and professor at University of Pisa	MPC · 3176
3177 Chillicothe	1934 AK	City of Chillicothe, Ohio	MPC · 3177
3178 Yoshitsune	1984 WA	Minamoto no Yoshitsune (1159–1189), nobleman and military commander, and one of the best known samurais	MPC · 3178
3179 Beruti	1962 FA	Arturo Berutti (1862–1938), Argentinian composer of classical music, known for his operas Pampa, Kryse, Evangelina and Taras Bulba	MPC · 3179
3180 Morgan	1962 RO	William Wilson Morgan (1906–1994), American astronomer	MPC · 3180
3181 Ahnert	1964 EC	Paul Oswald Ahnert (1897–1989), German astronomer and author of the annual Kalender fur Sternfreunde	MPC · 3181
3182 Shimanto	1984 WC	Shimanto River, longest river of the discoverer's home prefecture of Kochi, Japan	MPC · 3182
3183 Franzkaiser	1949 PP	Franz Kaiser (1891–1962), German astronomer	MPC · 3183
3184 Raab	1949 QC	Herbert Raab (born 1969), Austrian software engineer and amateur astronomer, author of Astrometrica software	MPC · 3184
3185 Clintford	1953 VY_{1}	Clinton B. Ford (1913–1992), American investor and amateur astronomer, secretary of the AAVSO, co-founder of the Ford Observatory, and recipient of ASP's Amateur Achievement Award	MPC · 3185
3186 Manuilova	1973 SD_{3}	Olga Manuilova (1893–1984), Soviet sculptor	MPC · 3186
3187 Dalian	1977 TO_{3}	Dalian, Liaoning, China	MPC · 3187
3188 Jekabsons	1978 OM	Peter Jekabsons (1943–1990), Australian amateur astronomer and astronomical painter, whose paintings adorn the walls of the discovering Perth Observatory	MPC · 3188
3189 Penza	1978 RF_{6}	Penza, Russian city	MPC · 3189
3190 Aposhanskij	1978 SR_{6}	Vladimir Mikhailovich Aposhanskij (1910–1943), Soviet poet and journalist	MPC · 3190
3191 Svanetia	1979 SX_{9}	Svanetia, a mountainous district in Georgia	MPC · 3191
3192 A'Hearn	1982 BY_{1}	Michael A'Hearn (1940–2017), American astronomer	MPC · 3192
3193 Elliot	1982 DJ	James L. Elliot (1943–2011), American professor of physics and astronomy at the Massachusetts Institute of Technology and co-discoverer of the Uranian rings	MPC · 3193
3194 Dorsey	1982 KD_{1}	Dorsey Taylor Shoemaker Jr., American businessman and uncle of Eugene Shoemaker (formerly credited 2nd discoverer)	MPC · 3194
3195 Fedchenko	1978 PT_{2}	The Russian Fedchenko family: Alexei Pavlovich Fedchenko (1844–1873), naturalist and explorer, his wife Olga Fedchenko (1845–1921), botanist and plant collector, and their son Boris Fedtschenko (1872–1947), botanist, geographer and writer.	MPC · 3195
3196 Maklaj	1978 RY	Nicholas Miklouho-Maclay (1846–1888), Russian ethnologist and anthropologist who studied the Papuans in New Guinea	MPC · 3196
3197 Weissman	1981 AD	Paul Robert Weissman, American cometary physicist	MPC · 3197
3198 Wallonia	1981 YH_{1}	Wallonia (Walloon Region), one of the three federal regions of Belgium, the discoverer's birthplace and location of the Institut d'astrophysique (the discovery site operator)	MPC · 3198
3199 Nefertiti	1982 RA	Nefertiti (c. 1370 – c. 1330 BC), Egyptian queen	MPC · 3199
3200 Phaethon	1983 TB	Phaethon from Greek mythology. Son of Helios, he operated the solar chariot for a day, lost control of it and almost set fire to the Earth (the object, associated with the Geminid meteor stream, had then the smallest known perihelion distance)	MPC · 3200

== 3201–3300 ==
back to top

Named minor planet	Provisional	This minor planet was named for...	Ref · Catalog
3201 Sijthoff	6560 P-L	Albert Georg Sijthoff, Dutch publisher whose family backed the construction of the Sijthoff Planetarium in The Hague in 1934.	MPC · 3201
3202 Graff	A908 AA	Gareth V. Williams (born 1965), British astronomer at the Minor Planet Center	MPC · 3202
3203 Huth	1938 SL	Hans Huth (1925–1988), German astronomer	MPC · 3203
3204 Lindgren	1978 RH	Astrid Lindgren (1907–2002), Swedish writer	MPC · 3204
3205 Boksenberg	1979 MO_{6}	Alexander Boksenberg (born 1936), British astronomer	MPC · 3205
3206 Wuhan	1980 VN_{1}	Wuhan, the largest city in central China	MPC · 3206
3207 Spinrad	1981 EY_{25}	Hyron Spinrad (1934–2015), American astronomer	MPC · 3207
3208 Lunn	1981 JM	Borge Lunn, Danish civil engineer and metallurgist	MPC · 3208
3209 Buchwald	1982 BL_{1}	Vagn Fabritius Buchwald, Danish meteoriticist	MPC · 3209
3210 Lupishko	1983 WH_{1}	Dmitrij Fedorovich Lupishko, Ukrainian astronomer	MPC · 3210
3211 Louispharailda	1931 CE	Louis Pierre Van Biesbroeck, and Pharailda de Colpaert Van Biesbroeck, parents of the discoverer	MPC · 3211
3212 Agricola	1938 DH_{2}	Georgius Agricola (1494–1555), German scientist, "father of mineralogy"	MPC · 3212
3213 Smolensk	1977 NQ	Smolensk, Russian city	MPC · 3213
3214 Makarenko	1978 TZ_{6}	Anton Makarenko (1888–1939), Soviet teacher and writer	MPC · 3214
3215 Lapko	1980 BQ	Konstantin Kuz'mich Lapko, Soviet surgeon	MPC · 3215
3216 Harrington	1980 RB	Robert Sutton Harrington (1942–1993), American astronomer	MPC · 3216
3217 Seidelmann	1980 RK	Paul Kenneth Seidelmann, American astronomer	MPC · 3217
3218 Delphine	6611 P-L	Delphine Jehoulet Delsemme, wife of Armand Delsemme, a Belgian-born astronomer at the University of Toledo in Ohio (see (2954))	MPC · 3218
3219 Komaki	1934 CX	Kōjirō Komaki, Japanese amateur astronomer	MPC · 3219
3220 Murayama	1951 WF	Sadao Murayama, Japanese astronomer	MPC · 3220
3221 Changshi	1981 XF_{2}	Changshu, Jiangsu, China	MPC · 3221
3222 Liller	1983 NJ	William Liller, American astronomer †	MPC · 3222
3223 Forsius	1942 RN	Sigfrid Aronus Forsius (Siegfried Aronsen; c. 1550–1624), Finnish-born Professor of Astronomy in Uppsala, Sweden. His 1611 manuscript propounding his theory of colours was discovered in the Royal Library in Stockholm in 1969	MPC · 3223
3224 Irkutsk	1977 RL_{6}	Irkutsk, Russia	MPC · 3224
3225 Hoag	1982 QQ	Arthur Hoag (1921–1999), American astronomer	MPC · 3225
3226 Plinius	6565 P-L	Pliny the Younger (62–114)	MPC · 3226
3227 Hasegawa	1928 DF	Ichirō Hasegawa, Japanese astronomer	MPC · 3227
3228 Pire	1935 CL	Georges Pire (Father Dominique), Belgian monk (Dominican Order), winner of the 1958 Nobel Prize for Peace	MPC · 3228
3229 Solnhofen	A916 PC	Solnhofen, south (SSE) of Nuremberg in Germany and known for its limestone and fossils	MPC · 3229
3230 Vampilov	1972 LE	Alexander Vampilov (1937–1972), Soviet playwright	MPC · 3230
3231 Mila	1972 RU_{2}	Lyudmila Pakhomova (1946–1986), Soviet ice dancer	MPC · 3231
3232 Brest	1974 SL	Brest, a city in Belarus	MPC · 3232
3233 Krišbarons	1977 RA_{6}	Krišjānis Barons (1835–1923), Latvian folklorist	MPC · 3233
3234 Hergiani	1978 QO_{2}	Mikhail Vissarionovich Hergiani (1932–1969), famous Soviet mountaineer	MPC · 3234
3235 Melchior	1981 EL_{1}	Paul Jacques Léon Melchior, Belgian geophysicist	MPC · 3235
3236 Strand	1982 BH_{1}	Kaj Aage Gunnar Strand (1907–2000), Danish and American astronomer	MPC · 3236
3237 Victorplatt	1984 SA_{5}	Victor D. Platt, father of astronomer John Platt who discovered this minor planet	MPC · 3237
3238 Timresovia	1975 VB_{9}	Nikolay Timofeev-Ressovsky (1900–1981), Soviet biologist	MPC · 3238
3239 Meizhou	1978 UJ_{2}	Meizhou, Guangdong, China	MPC · 3239
3240 Laocoon	1978 VG_{6}	Laocoön, Trojan priest of Poseidon	MPC · 3240
3241 Yeshuhua	1978 WH_{14}	Ye Shuhua (born 1927), Chinese astronomer	MPC · 3241
3242 Bakhchisaraj	1979 SG_{9}	Bakhchisaray, a town in Crimea, the center of the same district where Crimean Astrophysical Observatory was created	MPC · 3242
3243 Skytel	1980 DC	named after Sky and Telescope magazine for its 50th anniversary	MPC · 3243
3244 Petronius	4008 P-L	Petronius (c. 27–66 AD), Roman writer	MPC · 3244
3245 Jensch	1973 UL_{5}	Alfred Jensch, German astronomer and engineer (1912–2001)	MPC · 3245
3246 Bidstrup	1976 GQ_{3}	Herluf Bidstrup (1912–1988), Danish caricaturist	MPC · 3246
3247 Di Martino	1981 YE	Mario Di Martino (born 1947), Italian astronomer and discoverer of minor planets at the Turin Observatory. He has been a prolific photometrist of rotational light-curves of minor planets, specialized in determining their shape and pole.	MPC · 3247
3248 Farinella	1982 FK	Paolo Farinella (1953–2000), Italian astronomer	MPC · 3248
3249 Musashino	1977 DT_{4}	Musashino, a suburb of Tokyo, Japan	MPC · 3249
3250 Martebo	1979 EB	Martebo, on Gotland island in Sweden	MPC · 3250
3251 Eratosthenes	6536 P-L	Eratosthenes (c. 276–194 BC), Ancient Greek scientist	MPC · 3251
3252 Johnny	1981 EM_{4}	Johnny Carson (1925–2005), American TV host and comedian, and amateur astronomer	MPC · 3252
3253 Gradie	1982 HQ_{1}	Jonathan Carey Gradie, American astronomer	MPC · 3253
3254 Bus	1982 UM	Schelte J. Bus (born 1956), American astronomer and discoverer of minor planets	MPC · 3254
3255 Tholen	1980 RA	David J. Tholen (born 1955), American astronomer and discoverer of minor planets	MPC · 3255
3256 Daguerre	1981 SJ_{1}	Louis Daguerre (1787–1851), French chemist and artist, pioneer of photography (the Daguerreotype process)	MPC · 3256
3257 Hanzlík	1982 GG	Stanislav Hanzlík (1878–1956), Czech meteorologist and climatologist	MPC · 3257
3258 Somnium	1983 RJ	Kepler's Somnium, sive opus posthumum de astronomia lunaris (The Dream, or Posthumous Work on Lunar Astronomy), which combined a serious study of lunar astronomy and the fictional account of a journey to the Moon	MPC · 3258
3259 Brownlee	1984 SZ_{4}	Donald E. Brownlee (born 1943), American astronomer	MPC · 3259
3260 Vizbor	1974 SO_{2}	Yuri Vizbor (1934–1984), Russian actor, poet, writer, composer and playwright	MPC · 3260
3261 Tvardovskij	1979 SF_{9}	Aleksandr Tvardovsky (1910–1971), Soviet poet	MPC · 3261
3262 Miune	1983 WB	Miune, mountain in Kōchi, Japan	MPC · 3262
3263 Bligh	1932 CN	William Bligh (1754–1817), captain of the Bounty	MPC · 3263
3264 Bounty	1934 AF	HMS Bounty, ship	MPC · 3264
3265 Fletcher	1953 VN_{2}	Fletcher Christian (1764–1793), Bounty mutineer	MPC · 3265
3266 Bernardus	1978 PA	Andres Bernardus Muller, Dutch astronomer	MPC · 3266
3267 Glo	1981 AA	Eleanor F. Helin (1932–2009), American astronomer, comet hunter, discoverer of minor planets and advisor to the Planetary Society. Glo is her nickname.	MPC · 3267
3268 De Sanctis	1981 DD	Giovanni de Sanctis (born 1949), Italian astronomer and a discoverer of minor planets	MPC · 3268
3269 Vibert-Douglas	1981 EX_{16}	Vibert Douglas (1894–1988), Canadian astronomer	MPC · 3269
3270 Dudley	1982 DA	H. Dudley Wright, engineer, inventor, entrepreneur and benefactor of science, education and the arts in California and in Geneva, Switzerland.	MPC · 3270
3271 Ul	1982 RB	Ul, a lunar deity in the mythology of Vanuatu	MPC · 3271
3272 Tillandz	1938 DB_{1}	Elias Tillandz (1640–1693), Swedish medical doctor and botanist	MPC · 3272
3273 Drukar	1975 TS_{2}	Ivan Fyodorov (1525–1583), one of the first printers of books in Russia and Ukraine. The word Drukar means 'printer' in Ukrainian and old Russian.	MPC · 3273
3274 Maillen	1981 QO_{2}	Maillen, Belgium	MPC · 3274
3275 Oberndorfer	1982 HE_{1}	Hans Oberndorfer (1925–2006), German amateur astronomer, author and director of the Bavarian Public Observatory (Volkssternwarte München)	MPC · 3275
3276 Porta Coeli	1982 RZ_{1}	Porta Coeli ("Gateway to Heaven") convent in Tišnov, Czech Republic	MPC · 3276
3277 Aaronson	1984 AF_{1}	Marc Aaronson (1950–1987), American astronomer	MPC · 3277
3278 Běhounek	1984 BT	František Běhounek (1898–1973), Czech physicist	MPC · 3278
3279 Solon	9103 P-L	Solon (c. 630–560 BC), Greek lawmaker	MPC · 3279
3280 Grétry	1933 SJ	André Grétry (1741–1813), Belgian composer from Wallonia	MPC · 3280
3281 Maupertuis	1938 DZ	Pierre Louis Maupertuis (1698–1759), French mathematician and astronomer	MPC · 3281
3282 Spencer Jones	1949 DA	Harold Spencer Jones (1890–1960), British astronomer, former Astronomer Royal	MPC · 3282
3283 Skorina	1979 QA_{10}	Francysk Skaryna (died 1552), first doctor of medicine in Belarus, printer and publisher	MPC · 3283
3284 Niebuhr	1953 NB	Reinhold Niebuhr (1892–1971), American theologian	MPC · 3284
3285 Ruth Wolfe	1983 VW_{1}	Ruth Fanton Wolfe, American geologist, colleague of Gene and Carolyn Shoemaker at the United States Geological Survey	MPC · 3285
3286 Anatoliya	1980 BV	Anatoly V. Karachkin (1947–1984), brother-in-law of astronomer Lyudmila Karachkina who discovered this minor planet	MPC · 3286
3287 Olmstead	1981 DK_{1}	C. Michelle Olmstead (born 1969), American astronomer and discoverer of minor planets	MPC · 3287
3288 Seleucus	1982 DV	Seleucus I Nicator (c. 358–281 BC), one of the generals of Alexander the Great and heir to the largest part of his empire	MPC · 3288
3289 Mitani	1934 RP	Tetsuyasu Mitani (1927–2004), Japanese astronomer and discoverer of 1619 Ueta	MPC · 3289
3290 Azabu	1973 SZ_{1}	Azabu, a district of Tokyo, Japan	MPC · 3290
3291 Dunlap	1982 VX_{3}	Larry Dunlap, American astronomer	MPC · 3291
3292 Sather	2631 P-L	Bob Sather, research assistant Lunar and Planetary Laboratory	MPC · 3292
3293 Rontaylor	4650 P-L	Ronald C. Taylor, American astronomer	MPC · 3293
3294 Carlvesely	6563 P-L	Carl D. Vesely, American astronomer	MPC · 3294
3295 Murakami	1950 DH	Tadayoshi Murakami (1907–1985), Japanese astronomer	MPC · 3295
3296 Bosque Alegre	1975 SF	The astrophysical station of Córdoba Observatory in Argentina	MPC · 3296
3297 Hong Kong	1978 WN_{14}	Hong Kong, Chinese island and city	MPC · 3297
3298 Massandra	1979 OB_{15}	Massandra, town on the Crimean peninsula	MPC · 3298
3299 Hall	1980 TX_{5}	John Scoville Hall, American astronomer and director of the Lowell Observatory from 1958 to 1977	MPC · 3299
3300 McGlasson	1928 NA	Scottish Surname of a small clan located in the highlands of Scotland.	MPC · 3300

== 3301–3400 ==
back to top

Named minor planet	Provisional	This minor planet was named for...	Ref · Catalog
3301 Jansje	1978 CT	Jansje Verveer, mother of Dutch astronomer Arie Verveer	MPC · 3301
3302 Schliemann	1977 RS_{6}	Heinrich Schliemann (1822–1890), German archaeologist	MPC · 3302
3303 Merta	1967 UN	František Merta (1872–1953), teacher and journalist. Grandfather of the discoverer.	MPC · 3303
3304 Pearce	1981 EQ_{21}	Joseph Algernon Pearce (1893–1988), Canadian astronomer	MPC · 3304
3305 Ceadams	1985 KB	Charles Edward Adams (1870–1945), New Zealand astronomer	MPC · 3305
3306 Byron	1979 SM_{11}	Lord Byron (1788–1824), British poet	MPC · 3306
3307 Athabasca	1981 DE_{1}	The Athabascans, ancient people of North America	MPC · 3307
3308 Ferreri	1981 EP	Walter Ferreri (born 1948), Italian astronomer and discoverer of minor planets	MPC · 3308
3309 Brorfelde	1982 BH	Brorfelde Observatory in Denmark	MPC · 3309
3310 Patsy	1931 TS_{2}	Patricia Tombaugh (1912–2012), wife of discoverer Clyde Tombaugh	MPC · 3310
3311 Podobed	1976 QM_{1}	Vladimir Vladimirovich Podobed, Soviet astronomer	MPC · 3311
3312 Pedersen	1984 SN	Holger Pedersen (born 1946), Danish astronomer	MPC · 3312
3313 Mendel	1980 DG	Gregor Mendel (1822–1884), Czech-Austrian father of genetics	MPC · 3313
3314 Beals	1981 FH	Carlyle Smith Beals (1899–1979), Canadian astronomer	MPC · 3314
3315 Chant	1984 CZ	Clarence Chant (1865–1956), Canadian astronomer	MPC · 3315
3316 Herzberg	1984 CN_{1}	Gerhard Herzberg (1904–1999), German-born Canadian chemist and astronomer	MPC · 3316
3317 Paris	1984 KF	Paris, Trojan prince	MPC · 3317
3318 Blixen	1985 HB	Karen Blixen (1885–1962), Danish writer	MPC · 3318
3319 Kibi	1977 EJ_{5}	Kibi Province (ancient name of Okayama Prefecture and eastern half of Hiroshima Prefecture), Japan	MPC · 3319
3320 Namba	1982 VZ_{4}	Naniwa, traditional name of Osaka, Japan	MPC · 3320
3321 Dasha	1975 TZ_{2}	Dasha from Sevastopol (1836–1892), Russian sister of charity	MPC · 3321
3322 Lidiya	1975 XY_{1}	Lydia Zvereva (1890–1916), the first Russian female aviator	MPC · 3322
3323 Turgenev	1979 SY_{9}	Ivan Turgenev (1818–1883), Russian writer	MPC · 3323
3324 Avsyuk	1983 CW_{1}	Yurii Nikolaevich Avsyuk, Russian geophysicist (specialist in gravimetry and geodynamics)	MPC · 3324
3325 TARDIS	1984 JZ	The TARDIS, time machine in Doctor Who	MPC · 3325
3326 Agafonikov	1985 FL	Askol'd M. Agafonikov, Russian geophysicist and navigator of the third Russian Antarctic expedition	MPC · 3326
3327 Campins	1985 PW	Humberto Campins (Humberto Campins Camejo), Venezuelan-born American astronomer	MPC · 3327
3328 Interposita	1985 QD_{1}	The discovery film was exposed hastily between two satellite laser ranging sessions in the adjacent dome.	MPC · 3328
3329 Golay	1985 RT_{1}	Marcel Golay (1927–2015), Swiss astronomer at Geneva Observatory	MPC · 3329
3330 Gantrisch	1985 RU_{1}	Gantrisch, a mountain south of Bern in Switzerland	MPC · 3330
3331 Kvistaberg	1979 QS	Kvistaberg, site of Uppsala Observatory, Sweden	MPC · 3331
3332 Raksha	1978 NT_{1}	Yurij Mikhajlovich Raksha (1937–1980), Russian artist	MPC · 3332
3333 Schaber	1980 TG_{5}	Gerald Gene Schaber, American planetary geologist with the USGS	MPC · 3333
3334 Somov	1981 YR	Mikhail Somov (1908–1973), Soviet Antarctic explorer	MPC · 3334
3335 Quanzhou	1966 AA	Quanzhou, Fujian, China	MPC · 3335
3336 Grygar	1971 UX	Jiří Grygar (born 1936), Czech astronomer	MPC · 3336
3337 Miloš	1971 UG_{1}	Miloš Tichý (born 1966), Czech astronomer and discoverer of minor planets	MPC · 3337
3338 Richter	1973 UX_{5}	Nikolaus B. Richter (1910–1980), first director of the Tautenburg Observatory (1960–1975)	MPC · 3338
3339 Treshnikov	1978 LB	Alexey Tryoshnikov (1914–1991), Soviet Antarctic explorer	MPC · 3339
3340 Yinhai	1979 TK	Yinhai, Guangxi, China	MPC · 3340
3341 Hartmann	1980 OD	William Kenneth Hartmann (born 1939), American planetary scientist, writer, and painter	MPC · 3341
3342 Fivesparks	1982 BD_{3}	In honor of Newton and Margaret Mayall (1902–1995), American astronomer. The name refers to their residence in Cambridge, Massachusetts	MPC · 3342
3343 Nedzel	1982 HS	V. Alexander Nedzel, American supporter of the supporter of Lincoln Near-Earth Asteroid Research, which discovered this asteroid	MPC · 3343
3344 Modena	1982 JA	Modena, city in Italy	MPC · 3344
3345 Tarkovskij	1982 YC_{1}	Andrei Tarkovsky (1932–1986), Soviet film producer	MPC · 3345
3346 Gerla	1951 SD	Gertrude Lawrence (1898–1952), English actress	MPC · 3346
3347 Konstantin	1975 VN_{1}	Konstantin Kalinin (1889–1938), Soviet aviator	MPC · 3347
3348 Pokryshkin	1978 EA_{3}	Alexander Pokryshkin (1913–1985), Soviet pilot	MPC · 3348
3349 Manas	1979 FH_{2}	Manas, a Kyrgyz epic poem	MPC · 3349
3350 Scobee	1980 PJ	Dick Scobee (1939–1986), STS-51-L crew member	MPC · 3350
3351 Smith	1980 RN_{1}	Michael J. Smith (1945–1986), STS-51-L crew member	MPC · 3351
3352 McAuliffe	1981 CW	Christa McAuliffe (1948–1986), STS-51-L crew member	MPC · 3352
3353 Jarvis	1981 YC	Gregory Jarvis (1944–1986), STS-51-L crew member	MPC · 3353
3354 McNair	1984 CW	Ronald McNair (1950–1986), STS-51-L crew member	MPC · 3354
3355 Onizuka	1984 CC_{1}	Ellison Onizuka (1946–1986), STS-51-L crew member	MPC · 3355
3356 Resnik	1984 EU	Judith Resnik (1949–1986), STS-51-L crew member	MPC · 3356
3357 Tolstikov	1984 FT	Yevgeny Tolstikov (1913–1987), Russian meteorologist and Polar explorer who lead the third Soviet Antarctic expedition	MPC · 3357
3358 Anikushin	1978 RX	Mikhail Anikushin (1917–1997), Russian sculptor	MPC · 3358
3359 Purcari	1978 RA_{6}	Moldavian wine producer	MPC · 3359
3360 Syrinx	1981 VA	Syrinx, a nymph	MPC · 3360
3361 Orpheus	1982 HR	Orpheus, mythological Greek musician	MPC · 3361
3362 Khufu	1984 QA	Khufu, Egyptian pharaoh	MPC · 3362
3363 Bowen	1960 EE	Ira Sprague Bowen (1898–1973) was an American astronomer and director of the Mount Wilson and Palomar observatories	MPC · 3363
3364 Zdenka	1984 GF	Zdeňka Vávrová (born 1945), Czech astronomer	MPC · 3364
3365 Recogne	1985 CG_{2}	Recogne in the Ardennes, Belgium	MPC · 3365
3366 Gödel	1985 SD_{1}	Kurt Gödel (1906–1978), Austro-Hungarian logician	MPC · 3366
3367 Alex	1983 CA_{3}	Alex R. Baltutis, grandson of the discoverer	MPC · 3367
3368 Duncombe	1985 QT	Raynor Lockwood Duncombe, American astronomer	MPC · 3368
3369 Freuchen	1985 UZ	Peter Freuchen (1886–1957), Danish polar explorer and author	MPC · 3369
3370 Kohsai	1934 CU	Hiroki Kosai (born 1933), Japanese astronomer	MPC · 3370
3371 Giacconi	1955 RZ	Riccardo Giacconi (1931–2018), Italian-born American astrophysicist and winner (with Raymond Davis and Masatoshi Koshiba) of the Nobel Prize for Physics in 2002	MPC · 3371
3372 Bratijchuk	1976 SP_{4}	Matrena Vasil'evna Bratijchuk, Ukrainian astronomer	MPC · 3372
3373 Koktebelia	1978 QQ_{2}	Koktebel, a resort on the Black Sea in Crimea	MPC · 3373
3374 Namur	1980 KO	Namur, capital of the region of Wallonia in Belgium	MPC · 3374
3375 Amy	1981 JY_{1}	Amy Shoemaker Prescott, relative of the discoverer	MPC · 3375
3376 Armandhammer	1982 UJ_{8}	Armand Hammer (1898–1990), American industrialist and art collector	MPC · 3376
3377 Lodewijk	4122 P-L	Lodewijk Woltjer (born 1930), Dutch astronomer	MPC · 3377
3378 Susanvictoria	A922 WB	Susan Titus and Victoria Van Biesbroeck Streeter, granddaughters of the discoverer	MPC · 3378
3379 Oishi	1931 TJ_{1}	Hideo Oishi, Japanese amateur astronomer and orbit computer	MPC · 3379
3380 Awaji	1940 EF	Awaji Island, Japan	MPC · 3380
3381 Mikkola	1941 UG	Seppo Mikkola (born 1947), Finnish astronomer	MPC · 3381
3382 Cassidy	1948 RD	William A. Cassidy (born 1928), American meteoriticist	MPC · 3382
3383 Koyama	1951 AB	Hisako Koyama, Japanese amateur astronomer	MPC · 3383
3384 Daliya	1974 SB_{1}	Vladimir Dal (1801–1872), Russian lexicologist and ethnographer	MPC · 3384
3385 Bronnina	1979 SK_{11}	Nina Mikhailovna Bronnikova, Russian astronomer at Pulkovo Observatory	MPC · 3385
3386 Klementinum	1980 FA	The Clementinum, college in Prague	MPC · 3386
3387 Greenberg	1981 WE	Richard J. Greenberg, American planetary scientist at the University of Arizona	MPC · 3387
3388 Tsanghinchi	1981 YR_{1}	Hin-Chi Tsang, Chinese industrialist	MPC · 3388
3389 Sinzot	1984 DU	Family name of the discoverer's grandmother	MPC · 3389
3390 Demanet	1984 ES_{1}	The family name of the discoverer's paternal grandmother	MPC · 3390
3391 Sinon	1977 DD_{3}	Sinon, mythical Greek warrior	MPC · 3391
3392 Setouchi	1979 YB	Setouchi Region, Japan	MPC · 3392
3393 Štúr	1984 WY_{1}	Ľudovít Štúr (1815–1856), Slovak leader and writer	MPC · 3393
3394 Banno	1986 DB	Yoshiaki Banno (1952–1991), Japanese engineer and a discoverer of minor planets	MPC · 3394
3395 Jitka	1985 UN	Jitka Benešová, Czech assistant at Klet Observatory	MPC · 3395
3396 Muazzez	A915 TE	Muazzez K. Lohmiller, staff member of the Smithsonian Astrophysical Observatory	MPC · 3396
3397 Leyla	1964 XA	Nancy Leyla Lohmiller (born 1985), daughter of Muazzez Lohmiller	MPC · 3397
3398 Stättmayer	1978 PC	Peter Stättmayer, German amateur astronomer, director of the Munich Public Observatory	MPC · 3398
3399 Kobzon	1979 SZ_{9}	Joseph Kobzon (1937–2018), Soviet singer	MPC · 3399
3400 Aotearoa	1981 GX	Māori name for New Zealand	MPC · 3400

== 3401–3500 ==
back to top

Named minor planet	Provisional	This minor planet was named for...	Ref · Catalog
3401 Vanphilos	1981 PA	Vanessa Hall and Philip Osborne, on the occasion of their marriage. The name was given by Gareth V. Williams, astronomer at the Minor Planet Center and a friend of the couple.	MPC · 3401
3402 Wisdom	1981 PB	Jack Wisdom, American astronomer at MIT	MPC · 3402
3403 Tammy	1981 SW	Tammy Irelan, wife of R. L. Irelan staff member at Lincoln Laboratory's Experimental Test Site	MPC · 3403
3404 Hinderer	1934 CY	Fritz Hinderer (1912–1991), German astronomer at Babelsberg Observatory	MPC · 3404
3405 Daiwensai	1964 UQ	Wen-Sai Dai (1911–1979), Chinese astronomer	MPC · 3405
3406 Omsk	1969 DA	Omsk, Russia	MPC · 3406
3407 Jimmysimms	1973 DT	James A. C. Simms III (born 1957), American system administrator	MPC · 3407
3408 Shalamov	1977 QG_{4}	Varlam Shalamov (1907–1982), Soviet writer	MPC · 3408
3409 Abramov	1977 RE_{6}	Fyodor Abramov (1920–1983), Soviet writer	MPC · 3409
3410 Vereshchagin	1978 SZ_{7}	Vasily Vereshchagin (1842–1904), Russian painter	MPC · 3410
3411 Debetencourt	1980 LK	The family name of the mother of astronomer Georges Roland, who co-discovered Comet Arend–Roland	MPC · 3411
3412 Kafka	1983 AU_{2}	Franz Kafka (1883–1924), German-Czech writer	MPC · 3412
3413 Andriana	1983 CB_{3}	Andriana Marie Hazelton, granddaughter of the discoverer Norman G. Thomas	MPC · 3413
3414 Champollion	1983 DJ	Jean-François Champollion (1790–1832), French linguist	MPC · 3414
3415 Danby	1928 SL	Michael Anthony Danby, British-born mathematician formerly of North Carolina State University	MPC · 3415
3416 Dorrit	1931 VP	Dorrit Hoffleit (1907–2007), American astronomer	MPC · 3416
3417 Tamblyn	1937 GG	Peter Tamblyn, American astronomer	MPC · 3417
3418 Izvekov	1973 QZ_{1}	Vladimir Andreevich Izvekov, Soviet astronomer	MPC · 3418
3419 Guth	1981 JZ	Vladimír Guth (1905–1980), Slovak astronomer	MPC · 3419
3420 Standish	1984 EB	E. Myles Standish Jr, American astronomer, Caltech/JPL	MPC · 3420
3421 Yangchenning	1975 WK_{1}	Yang Chen-Ning (1922–2025), Chinese-American physicist	MPC · 3421
3422 Reid	1978 OJ	Ruth and Gordon Reid (1923–1989), professor of politics at the University of Western Australia	MPC · 3422
3423 Slouka	1981 CK	Hubert Slouka (1903–1973), Czech astronomer	MPC · 3423
3424 Nušl	1982 CD	František Nušl (1867–1951), Czech astronomer and mathematician	MPC · 3424
3425 Hurukawa	1929 BD	Kiichirō Furukawa (Hurukawa, 1929–2016), Japanese astronomer and discoverer of minor planets	MPC · 3425
3426 Seki	1932 CQ	Tsutomu Seki (born 1930), Japanese astronomer and discoverer of minor planets	MPC · 3426
3427 Szentmártoni	1938 AD	Béla Szentmártoni (1931–1988), Hungarian amateur astronomer	MPC · 3427
3428 Roberts	1952 JH	Walter Orr Roberts (1915–1990), American astronomer and atmospheric physicist	MPC · 3428
3429 Chuvaev	1974 SU_{1}	Konstantin Konstantinovich Chuvaev (1917–1994), Soviet astronomer	MPC · 3429
3430 Bradfield	1980 TF_{4}	William A. Bradfield (1927–2014), Australian amateur astronomer	MPC · 3430
3431 Nakano	1984 QC	Shuichi Nakano (born 1947), Japanese astronomer	MPC · 3431
3432 Kobuchizawa	1986 EE	Kobuchizawa Observatory in Japan which contributes asteroid (Near Earth Objects) observations to the Minor Planet Center	MPC · 3432
3433 Fehrenbach	1963 TJ_{1}	Charles Fehrenbach (1914–2008), French astronomer	MPC · 3433
3434 Hurless	1981 VO	Carolyn Hurless (1934–1987), American amateur astronomer	MPC · 3434
3435 Boury	1981 XC_{2}	Arsène Boury (1934–1982), Belgian astronomer	MPC · 3435
3436 Ibadinov	1976 SS_{3}	Hursandkul Ibadinov, Tajik astronomer	MPC · 3436
3437 Kapitsa	1982 UZ_{5}	Pyotr Kapitsa (1894–1984), Russian physicist, winner of the Nobel Prize for Physics in 1978	MPC · 3437
3438 Inarradas	1974 SD_{5}	Argentine Institute of Radio Astronomy Spanish: Instituto Argentino de Radioastronomia	MPC · 3438
3439 Lebofsky	1983 RL_{2}	Larry A. Lebofsky, American astronomer	MPC · 3439
3440 Stampfer	1950 DD	Simon von Stampfer (1792–1864), Austrian geodesist and astronomer, pioneer of cinematography	MPC · 3440
3441 Pochaina	1969 TS_{1}	Pochaina, a tributary of the Dnieper in the Ukraine	MPC · 3441
3442 Yashin	1978 TO_{7}	Lev Yashin (1929–1990), Soviet goalkeeper	MPC · 3442
3443 Leetsungdao	1979 SB_{1}	Tsung-Dao Lee (born 1926), Chinese American physicist and winner of the Nobel Prize for Physics	MPC · 3443
3444 Stepanian	1980 RJ_{2}	Natalia Nikolaevna Stepanian (astrophysicist) and Arnol'd Artashesovich Stepanian (head of the gamma-ray laboratory) both astronomers at the Crimean Astrophysical Observatory	MPC · 3444
3445 Pinson	1983 FC	William H. Pinson (1919–), American geochemist	MPC · 3445
3446 Combes	1942 EB	Michel-Alain Combes (born 1942), French astronomer	MPC · 3446
3447 Burckhalter	1956 SC	Charles Burckhalter (1849–1923), American astronomer	MPC · 3447
3448 Narbut	1977 QA_{5}	Heorhiy Narbut (1886–1920), Ukrainian graphic designer	MPC · 3448
3449 Abell	1978 VR_{9}	George O. Abell (1927–1983), American astronomer	MPC · 3449
3450 Dommanget	1983 QJ	Jean Dommanget, Belgian astronomer	MPC · 3450
3451 Mentor	1984 HA_{1}	Mentor, mythological Greek king, son of Imbrus at Pedaseus, father of Imbrius, ally of the Trojans	MPC · 3451
3452 Hawke	1980 OA	Bernard Ray Hawke, American planetary geologist at the University of Hawaii	MPC · 3452
3453 Dostoevsky	1981 SS_{5}	Fyodor Dostoevsky (1821–1881), Russian writer	MPC · 3453
3454 Lieske	1981 WB_{1}	Jay Henry Lieske, American astronomer	MPC · 3454
3455 Kristensen	1985 QC	Leif Kahl Kristensen, Danish astronomer	MPC · 3455
3456 Etiennemarey	1985 RS_{2}	Étienne-Jules Marey (1830–1904), French surgeon, physiologist, inventor of the chronophotograph, pioneer of cinematography, contemporary of Eadweard Muybridge	MPC · 3456
3457 Arnenordheim	1985 RA_{3}	Arne Nordheim (1931–2010), Norwegian composer	MPC · 3457
3458 Boduognat	1985 RT_{3}	Boduognaty or Boduognatus, leader of the Nervii in Gaul who, with the Atrebates and Viromandui, fought Julius Caesar in 57 BC	MPC · 3458
3459 Bodil	1986 GB	Bodil Jensen, wife of the discoverer Poul Jensen	MPC · 3459
3460 Ashkova	1973 QB_{2}	Nataliya Vladimirovna Ashkova, Soviet astronomer at the Institute for Theoretical Astronomy	MPC · 3460
3461 Mandelshtam	1977 SA_{1}	Osip Mandelstam (1891–1938), Soviet poet	MPC · 3461
3462 Zhouguangzhao	1981 UA_{10}	Zhou Guangzhao (born 1929), Chinese physicist	MPC · 3462
3463 Kaokuen	1981 XJ_{2}	Charles K. Kao (1933–2018), Chinese physicist	MPC · 3463
3464 Owensby	1983 BA	Pamela D. Owensby, planetary astronomer at the University of Hawaii	MPC · 3464
3465 Trevires	1984 SQ_{5}	Ancient Belgian tribe, mentioned in Julius Caesar's Gallic Wars	MPC · 3465
3466 Ritina	1975 EA_{6}	discoverer's daughter Margarita, who was also an astronomer at Crimean Astrophysical Observatory	MPC · 3466
3467 Bernheim	1981 SF_{2}	Robert Burnham Jr. (1931–1993), American astronomer and discoverer of minor planets	MPC · 3467
3468 Urgenta	1975 AM	Type of potato	MPC · 3468
3469 Bulgakov	1982 UL_{7}	Mikhail Bulgakov (1891–1940), Russian writer	MPC · 3469
3470 Yaronika	1975 ES	discoverer's son Yaroslav, who also works at CrAO	MPC · 3470
3471 Amelin	1977 QK_{2}	Valentin Mikhailovich Amelin (1930–1989), Soviet geodesist	MPC · 3471
3472 Upgren	1981 EJ_{10}	Arthur Reinhold Upgren, American astronomer	MPC · 3472
3473 Sapporo	A924 EG	Sapporo, Hokkaido, Japan	MPC · 3473
3474 Linsley	1962 HE	Earl Garfield Linsley (1882–1969), professor of geography at Mills College, California	MPC · 3474
3475 Fichte	1972 TD	Hubert Fichte (1935–1986), German writer	MPC · 3475
3476 Dongguan	1978 UF_{2}	Dongguan, Guangdong, China	MPC · 3476
3477 Kazbegi	1979 KH	Mount Kazbek, on the border between Georgia and Russia	MPC · 3477
3478 Fanale	1979 XG	Fraser Partington Fanale, American planetary geologist	MPC · 3478
3479 Malaparte	1980 TQ	Curzio Malaparte (1898–1957), Italian writer	MPC · 3479
3480 Abante	1981 GB	Robert Hamilton Brown, planetary astronomer at the Jet Propulsion Laboratory	MPC · 3480
3481 Xianglupeak	1982 DS_{6}	Xianglu Peak ("Incense Burner Peak", 557 m), highest point of the Fragrant Hill Park, northwest of Beijing, China	JPL · 3481
3482 Lesnaya	1975 VY_{4}	village Lesnaya, near which Swedes were defeated by the Russian army in the Battle of Lesnaya	MPC · 3482
3483 Svetlov	1976 YP_{2}	Mikhail Svetlov (1903–1964), Soviet poet	MPC · 3483
3484 Neugebauer	1978 NE	The Neugebauers, American family of physicists and mathematicians: Otto Neugebauer, historian of astronomy, Marcia Neugebauer and Gerald Neugebauer, both astronomers	MPC · 3484
3485 Barucci	1983 NU	Maria A. Barucci, Italian astronomer and discoverer of minor planets	MPC · 3485
3486 Fulchignoni	1984 CR	Marcello Fulchignoni, Italian astronomer	MPC · 3486
3487 Edgeworth	1978 UF	Kenneth Edgeworth (1880–1972), Irish engineer	MPC · 3487
3488 Brahic	1980 PM	André Brahic (1942–2016), French astronomer	MPC · 3488
3489 Lottie	1983 AT_{2}	Lottie Soll-Herkenhoff, wife of co-discoverer Kenneth E. Herkenhoff	MPC · 3489
3490 Šolc	1984 SV	Ivan Šolc, Czech inventor	MPC · 3490
3491 Fridolin	1984 SM_{4}	Fridolin of Säckingen, an Irish missionary, is the patron saint of the Swiss valley of Glarus	MPC · 3491
3492 Petra-Pepi	1985 DQ	Daughter of the discoverer	MPC · 3492
3493 Stepanov	1976 GR_{6}	Vladimir Yevgenyevich Stepanov (1913–1986), Soviet physicist	MPC · 3493
3494 Purple Mountain	1980 XW	Purple Mountain Observatory, Jiangsu, China	MPC · 3494
3495 Colchagua	1981 NU	Colchagua Province, Chile	MPC · 3495
3496 Arieso	1977 RC	name consists of acronyms of Astronomisches Rechen-Institut and the European Southern Observatory	MPC · 3496
3497 Innanen	1941 HJ	Kimmo Innanen (1937–2011), Finnish-Canadian astronomer	MPC · 3497
3498 Belton	1981 EG_{14}	Michael J. Belton (1934–2018), American astronomer	MPC · 3498
3499 Hoppe	1981 VW_{1}	Johannes Hoppe (1907–?), German professor of astronomy at the University of Jena	MPC · 3499
3500 Kobayashi	A919 SD	Takao Kobayashi (born 1961), astronomer	MPC · 3500

== 3501–3600 ==
back to top

Named minor planet	Provisional	This minor planet was named for...	Ref · Catalog
3501 Olegiya	1971 QU	Oleg Nikolaevich Korotsev (born 1922), Russian astronomer	MPC · 3501
3502 Huangpu	1964 TR_{1}	Huangpu District, Shanghai	MPC · 3502
3503 Brandt	1981 EF_{17}	John Conrad Brandt, American astronomer and author	MPC · 3503
3504 Kholshevnikov	1981 RV_{3}	Konstantin Vladislavovich Kholshevnikov, Russian astronomer and professor at Leningrad University	MPC · 3504
3505 Byrd	1983 AM	Deborah Byrd (born 1951), producer of the Earth & Sky radio series	MPC · 3505
3506 French	1984 CO_{1}	Linda M. French (born 1951), American Astronomer, Professor of Physics, Illinois Wesleyan University	MPC · 3506
3507 Vilas	1982 UX	Faith Vilas (born 1952), American planetary scientist and Director of the MMT Observatory in Arizona	MPC · 3507
3508 Pasternak	1980 DO_{5}	Boris Pasternak (1890–1960), Russian writer	MPC · 3508
3509 Sanshui	1978 UH_{2}	Sanshui, Chinese city in the Sanshui District	MPC · 3509
3510 Veeder	1982 TP	Glenn John Veeder, American astronomer	MPC · 3510
3511 Tsvetaeva	1982 TC_{2}	Marina Tsvetaeva (1892–1941), Soviet poet	MPC · 3511
3512 Eriepa	1984 AC_{1}	Erie, Pennsylvania	MPC · 3512
3513 Quqinyue	1965 UZ	Qu Qinyue (born 1935), Chinese astronomer	MPC · 3513
3514 Hooke	1971 UJ	Robert Hooke (1635–1703), English scientist	MPC · 3514
3515 Jindra	1982 UH_{2}	Lumír Jindra (born 1936), Czech pharmacologist and friend of the discoverer	MPC · 3515
3516 Rusheva	1982 UH_{7}	Nadya Rusheva (1952–1969), Russian painter	MPC · 3516
3517 Tatianicheva	1976 SE_{1}	Lyudmila Tatianicheva (1915–1980), Soviet poet	MPC · 3517
3518 Florena	1977 QC_{4}	Pavel Florensky (1882–1943), Russian religious philosopher, physicist and mathematician and hisson, Kirill Florensky (1915–1982), geochemist and mineralogist	MPC · 3518
3519 Ambiorix	1984 DO	Ambiorix, leader of Belgian tribe in the time of the Romans	MPC · 3519
3520 Klopsteg	1952 SG	Paul E. Klopsteg (1889–1991), American physicist	MPC · 3520
3521 Comrie	1982 MH	Leslie Comrie (1893–1950), New Zealand-born astronomer and pioneer in mathematical computation	MPC · 3521
3522 Becker	1941 SW	Reinhold von Becker (1788–1858), Finnish author and academic	MPC · 3522
3523 Arina	1975 TV_{2}	Arina Rodionovna Yakoleva (1758–1828), the nurse of Russian poet Alexander Pushkin	MPC · 3523
3524 Schulz	1981 EE_{27}	Charles M. Schulz (1922–2000), cartoonist and creator of the comic strip Peanuts (Charlie Brown; Charlie Brown).	MPC · 3524
3525 Paul	1983 CX_{2}	Paul J. Baltutis, son-in-law of the discoverer Norman G. Thomas	MPC · 3525
3526 Jeffbell	1984 CN	Space scientist/writer Jeffrey F. Bell	MPC · 3526
3527 McCord	1985 GE_{1}	Thomas Bard McCord, American astronomer (planetary geologist)	MPC · 3527
3528 Counselman	1981 EW_{3}	Charles Claude Counselman III (born 1943), American planetary scientist	MPC · 3528
3529 Dowling	1981 EQ_{19}	Timothy Edward Dowling, American planetary scientist and professor at MIT	MPC · 3529
3530 Hammel	1981 EC_{20}	Heidi Hammel (born 1960), American planetary scientist	MPC · 3530
3531 Cruikshank	1981 FB	Dale Cruikshank, NASA space scientist	MPC · 3531
3532 Tracie	1983 AS_{2}	Tracie Lynn Ojakangas, wife of co-discoverer Gregory Wayne Ojakangas	MPC · 3532
3533 Toyota	1986 UE	Toyota, Aichi, Japan	MPC · 3533
3534 Sax	1936 XA	Adolphe Sax (1814–1894), Belgian musical instrument designer, best known for inventing the saxophone	MPC · 3534
3535 Ditte	1979 SN_{11}	The main character of Ditte, a human child novel by Martin Andersen Nexø	MPC · 3535
3536 Schleicher	1981 EV_{20}	David Glenn Schleicher, American astronomer at Lowell Observatory	MPC · 3536
3537 Jürgen	1982 VT	Jürgen Rahe (1939–1997), Director of NASA's Solar System Exploration Division	MPC · 3537
3538 Nelsonia	6548 P-L	Elisabeth Nelson, secretary at Heidelberg Observatory and Max Planck Institute for Astronomy and took care of the investigators of the Palomar–Leiden Survey	MPC · 3538
3539 Weimar	1967 GF_{1}	Weimar, Germany	MPC · 3539
3540 Protesilaos	1973 UF_{5}	Protesilaos, mythical person related to Trojan War	MPC · 3540
3541 Graham	1984 ML	Lloyd Wilson Graham (1940- ), executive director of the department of state services, who supported the Perth Observatory	MPC · 3541
3542 Tanjiazhen	1964 TN_{2}	Tan Jiazhen (1909–2008), Chinese geneticist	MPC · 3542
3543 Ningbo	1964 VA_{3}	Ningbo Chinese city	MPC · 3543
3544 Borodino	1977 RD_{4}	Village in Russia, where the Battle of Borodino took place in 1812	MPC · 3544
3545 Gaffey	1981 WK_{2}	Michael James Gaffey (born 1945), American planetary geologist	MPC · 3545
3546 Atanasoff	1983 SC	John Vincent Atanasoff (1903–1995), American (of Bulgarian descent) mathematician and physicist, inventor of the Atanasoff–Berry Computer	MPC · 3546
3547 Serov	1978 TM_{6}	Valentin Serov (1865–1911), Russian painter	MPC · 3547
3548 Eurybates	1973 SO	Eurybates, mythological Greek soldier	MPC · 3548
3549 Hapke	1981 YH	Bruce Hapke (born 1931), American planetary scientist	MPC · 3549
3550 Link	1981 YS	František Link (1906–1984), Czech astronomer	MPC · 3550
3551 Verenia	1983 RD	First vestal virgin consecrated by the legendary Roman king Numa Pompilius	MPC · 3551
3552 Don Quixote	1983 SA	Don Quixote, eponymous hero of the novel by Cervantes	MPC · 3552
3553 Mera	1985 JA	Maera, a daughter of Praetus	MPC · 3553
3554 Amun	1986 EB	Amun, Egyptian god	MPC · 3554
3555 Miyasaka	1931 TC_{1}	Seidai Miyasaka (born 1955), Japanese astronomer and discoverer of minor planets	MPC · 3555
3556 Lixiaohua	1964 UO	Li Xiaohua, Chinese industrialist from Beijing	MPC · 3556
3557 Sokolsky	1977 QE_{1}	Andrej Georgievich Sokolskij, Soviet astronomer at ITA	MPC · 3557
3558 Shishkin	1978 SQ_{2}	Ivan Shishkin (1832–1898), Russian painter	MPC · 3558
3559 Violaumayer	1980 PH	Martin Mayer, German amateur astronomer, operating from the Violau Public Observatory	MPC · 3559
3560 Chenqian	1980 RZ_{2}	Chen Qian, director of the History Museum of Chinese Astronomy, helped to popularize astronomy in China.	MPC · 3560
3561 Devine	1983 HO	John Devine Hazelton, son-in-law of the discoverer Norman G. Thomas	MPC · 3561
3562 Ignatius	1984 AZ	Ignatius of Loyola (1491–1556), founder of the Jesuit Order	MPC · 3562
3563 Canterbury	1985 FE	Canterbury, New Zealand	MPC · 3563
3564 Talthybius	1985 TC_{1}	Talthybius, mythological Greek soldier	MPC · 3564
3565 Ojima	1986 YD	Ojima, Gunma, Japan, where the discoverers' observatory was situated	MPC · 3565
3566 Levitan	1979 YA_{9}	Isaac Levitan (1860–1900), Russian painter	MPC · 3566
3567 Alvema	1930 VD	The three great-granddaughters of the discoverer Eugène Joseph Delporte, Aline De Middelaer, and Véronique and Martine Warck	MPC · 3567
3568 ASCII	1936 UB	ASCII Corporation, Japan	MPC · 3568
3569 Kumon	1938 DN_{1}	Toru Kumon (1914–1995), Japanese educator	MPC · 3569
3570 Wuyeesun	1979 XO	Wu Yee-sun (1900–2005), Chinese bonsai artist	MPC · 3570
3571 Milanštefánik	1982 EJ	Milan Rastislav Štefánik, Slovak-French astronomer, meteorologist, general, one of the founders of Czechoslovakia	MPC · 3571
3572 Leogoldberg	1954 UJ_{2}	Leo Goldberg (1913–1987), American astronomer	MPC · 3572
3573 Holmberg	1982 QO_{1}	Erik Holmberg (1908–2000), Swedish astronomer	MPC · 3573
3574 Rudaux	1982 TQ	Lucien Rudaux (1874–1947), French astronomer	MPC · 3574
3575 Anyuta	1984 DU_{2}	Anna Aleksandrovna Shishmareva, Soviet parachutist	MPC · 3575
3576 Galina	1984 DB_{3}	Galina Bogdanovna Pyasetskaya, Soviet parachutist	MPC · 3576
3577 Putilin	1969 TK	Ivan Ivanovich Putilin (1893–1954), Soviet minor planet researcher	MPC · 3577
3578 Carestia	1977 CC	Reinaldo Augusto Carestia (1932–1993) researcher at the Felix Aguilar Observatory in Argentina	MPC · 3578
3579 Rockholt	1977 YA	Ronald Rockholt (born 1928), scientist	MPC · 3579
3580 Avery	1983 CS_{2}	Avery Jordan Thomas (born 1994), grandson of the discoverer	MPC · 3580
3581 Alvarez	1985 HC	Luis Walter Alvarez (1911–1988) and his son Walter Alvarez (born 1940), discoverers of the Iridium layer associated with the meteor impact which killed the dinosaurs 65 million years ago.	MPC · 3581
3582 Cyrano	1986 TT_{5}	Cyrano de Bergerac (1619–1655), French dramatist	MPC · 3582
3583 Burdett	1929 TQ	Burdett, Kansas, hometown of discoverer Clyde Tombaugh	MPC · 3583
3584 Aisha	1981 TW	Aisha Renee Thomas (born 1991), granddaughter of the discoverer Norman G. Thomas	MPC · 3584
3585 Goshirakawa	1987 BE	Emperor Go-Shirakawa (1127–1192), Japan	MPC · 3585
3586 Vasnetsov	1978 SW_{6}	Viktor Vasnetsov (1848–1926) and Apollinary Vasnetsov (1856–1933), Russian painters	MPC · 3586
3587 Descartes	1981 RK_{5}	René Descartes (1596–1650), French philosopher	MPC · 3587
3588 Kirik	1981 TH_{4}	Kirik the Novgorodian (c. 1110–1158), Novgorodian monk of the Antoniev Monastery	MPC · 3588
3589 Loyola	1984 AB_{1}	Loyola, a Spanish town and birthplace of Ignatius of Loyola, founder of the Jesuit Order	MPC · 3589
3590 Holst	1984 CQ	Gustav Holst (1874–1934), English composer	MPC · 3590
3591 Vladimirskij	1978 QJ_{2}	Boris Mikhajlovich Vladimirskij, astronomer at the Crimean Astrophysical Observatory	MPC · 3591
3592 Nedbal	1980 CT	Oskar Nedbal (1874–1930), Czech composer	MPC · 3592
3593 Osip	1981 EB_{20}	David J. Osip, researcher at Lowell Observatory	MPC · 3593
3594 Scotti	1983 CN	James V. Scotti (born 1960), astronomer (member of Spacewatch team)	MPC · 3594
3595 Gallagher	1985 TF_{1}	John S. Gallagher III, director of the Lowell Observatory	MPC · 3595
3596 Meriones	1985 VO	Meriones, mythical Greek warrior	MPC · 3596
3597 Kakkuri	1941 UL	Juhani Kakkuri, Finnish geodesist	MPC · 3597
3598 Saucier	1977 KK_{1}	Agnes Saucier, grandmother of the American astronomer Ellen Howell, who discovered this minor planet	MPC · 3598
3599 Basov	1978 PB_{3}	Nikolay Basov (1922–2001), Soviet physicist and Nobel Prize Laureate	MPC · 3599
3600 Archimedes	1978 SL_{7}	Archimedes (c. 287–212 BC), ancient Greek scientist	MPC · 3600

== 3601–3700 ==
back to top

Named minor planet	Provisional	This minor planet was named for...	Ref · Catalog
3601 Velikhov	1979 SP_{9}	Evgenij Pavlovich Velikhov, Russian physicist and member of the Russian Academy of Sciences	MPC · 3601
3602 Lazzaro	1981 DQ_{2}	Daniela Lazzaro (born 1956), Brazilian astronomer	MPC · 3602
3603 Gajdušek	1981 RM	Vilém Gajdušek (1895–1977), Czech telescope maker	MPC · 3603
3604 Berkhuijsen	5550 P-L	E. M. Berkhuijsen, Dutch astronomer of the Max Planck Institute for Radio Astronomy in Germany	MPC · 3604
3605 Davy	1932 WB	Named for Davy De Winter, son of the former administrator of the Royal Observatory of Belgium	MPC · 3605
3606 Pohjola	1939 SF	Pohjola, location in Finnish mythology	MPC · 3606
3607 Naniwa	1977 DO_{4}	Naniwa, traditional name of Osaka, Japan	MPC · 3607
3608 Kataev	1978 SD_{1}	Valentin Petrovich Kataev (1897–1986), Soviet writer	MPC · 3608
3609 Liloketai	1980 VM_{1}	Loke-Tai Li, Chinese educator	MPC · 3609
3610 Decampos	1981 EA_{1}	José Adolfo Snajdauf de Campos, Brazilian astronomer at Valongo Observatory	MPC · 3610
3611 Dabu	1981 YY_{1}	Dabu County, Guangdong, China	MPC · 3611
3612 Peale	1982 TW	Stanton J. Peale (1937–2015), American astrophysicist and planetary astronomer	MPC · 3612
3613 Kunlun	1982 VJ_{11}	Kunlun, mountain range in northwest China	MPC · 3613
3614 Tumilty	1983 AE_{1}	Jodi Anne Tumilty Thomas, daughter-in-law of the discoverer Norman G. Thomas	MPC · 3614
3615 Safronov	1983 WZ	Viktor Safronov (1917–1999), Soviet astronomer	MPC · 3615
3616 Glazunov	1984 JJ_{2}	Ilya Glazunov (1930–2017), Russian painter	MPC · 3616
3617 Eicher	1984 LJ	David J. Eicher (born 1961), American writer popularizer of astronomy and former editor-in-chief of Astronomy	MPC · 3617
3618 Kuprin	1979 QP_{8}	Aleksandr Kuprin (1870–1938), Russian writer	MPC · 3618
3619 Nash	1981 EU_{35}	Douglas B. Nash, American planetary scientist	MPC · 3619
3620 Platonov	1981 RU_{2}	Andrei Platonov (1899–1951), Russian writer	MPC · 3620
3621 Curtis	1981 SQ_{1}	Curtis R. Carbutt (1911–1976), teacher of the discoverer Norman G. Thomas	MPC · 3621
3622 Ilinsky	1981 SX_{7}	Igor Ilyinsky (1901–1987), Soviet actor	MPC · 3622
3623 Chaplin	1981 TG_{2}	Charlie Chaplin (1889–1977), English comedy actor	MPC · 3623
3624 Mironov	1982 TH_{2}	Andrei Mironov (1941–1987), Soviet actor and producer	MPC · 3624
3625 Fracastoro	1984 HZ_{1}	Mario Girolamo Fracastoro, Italian astronomer and former director of the Catania and the Pino Torinese observatories	MPC · 3625
3626 Ohsaki	1929 PA	Shoji Osaki (1912–), Japanese astronomical historian	MPC · 3626
3627 Sayers	1973 DS	Dorothy L. Sayers (1893–1957), British author	MPC · 3627
3628 Božněmcová	1979 WD	Božena Němcová (1820–1862), Czech writer	MPC · 3628
3629 Lebedinskij	1982 WK	Aleksandr Ignatevich Lebedinski (1913–1967), Soviet astronomer	MPC · 3629
3630 Lubomír	1984 QN	Lubomír is a Slavic first name common in the South Bohemian Region	MPC · 3630
3631 Sigyn	1987 BV_{1}	Daughter of the discoverer	MPC · 3631
3632 Grachevka	1976 SJ_{4}	Grachevka, a Russian village in Tambov Oblast (now Lipetsk Oblast), the birthplace of the discoverer's parents Stepan Chernykh and Melaniya Chernykh	MPC · 3632
3633 Mira	1980 EE_{2}	Hugo Mira (1937–1994), researcher at Felix Aguilar Observatory, Argentina	MPC · 3633
3634 Iwan	1980 FV	Iwan P. Williams, British astronomer	MPC · 3634
3635 Kreutz	1981 WO_{1}	Heinrich Kreutz (1854–1907), German astronomer	MPC · 3635
3636 Pajdušáková	1982 UJ_{2}	Ľudmila Pajdušáková (1916–1979), Slovak astronomer	MPC · 3636
3637 O'Meara	1984 UQ	Stephen James O'Meara, American astronomer, astronomy writer and author and contributing editor to Sky & Telescope	MPC · 3637
3638 Davis	1984 WX	Donald R. Davis, senior scientist at the Planetary Science Institute in Tucson	MPC · 3638
3639 Weidenschilling	1985 TX	Stuart J. Weidenschilling, American planetary scientist	MPC · 3639
3640 Gostin	1985 TR_{3}	Victor Gostin (born 1940), an Australian geologist and researcher of Australian impact craters	MPC · 3640
3641 Williams Bay	A922 WC	Williams Bay, Wisconsin, home of Yerkes Observatory	MPC · 3641
3642 Frieden	1953 XL_{1}	German for "peace"	MPC · 3642
3643 Tienchanglin	1978 UN_{2}	Chang-Lin Tien (1935–2002), former Chancellor of the University of California at Berkeley	MPC · 3643
3644 Kojitaku	1931 TW	Takuo Kojima (born 1955), Japanese astronomer and discoverer of minor planets	MPC · 3644
3645 Fabini	1981 QZ	Tatiana Fabini (1943–1989), Slovak astronomy writer	MPC · 3645
3646 Aduatiques	1985 RK_{4}	Aduatiques (Aduatuci), an ancient tribe from Namur, Belgium	MPC · 3646
3647 Dermott	1986 AD_{1}	Stanley Dermott, British-American astronomer	MPC · 3647
3648 Raffinetti	1957 HK	Virgilio Raffinetti (1869–1946), Argentine astronomer and a director of La Plata Observatory	MPC · 3648
3649 Guillermina	1976 HQ	Maria Guillermina Martin de Cesco (born 1915), widow and mother of Argentine astronomers Carlos Cesco and Mario R. Cesco, respectively	MPC · 3649
3650 Kunming	1978 UO_{2}	Kunming, Yunnan, China	MPC · 3650
3651 Friedman	1978 VB_{5}	Louis Friedman (born 1941), co-founder of the Planetary Society, and his wife, Connie	MPC · 3651
3652 Soros	1981 TC_{3}	George Soros (born 1930), Hungarian-born American businessman and philosopher	MPC · 3652
3653 Klimishin	1979 HF_{5}	Ivan Antonovich Klimishin, Ukrainian astronomer	MPC · 3653
3654 AAS	1949 QH_{1}	American Astronomical Society	MPC · 3654
3655 Eupraksia	1978 SA_{3}	Eupraxia of Ryazan, wife of prince Fyodor of Ryazan, who lived in the 13th century, she preferred to kill herself to being taken prisoner by Mongol-Tatars	MPC · 3655
3656 Hemingway	1978 QX	Ernest Hemingway (1899–1961), US writer	MPC · 3656
3657 Ermolova	1978 ST_{6}	Maria Yermolova (1853–1928), Russian actress	MPC · 3657
3658 Feldman	1982 TR	Paul D. Feldman, American astronomer, and Paul A. Feldman, Canadian radioastronomer	MPC · 3658
3659 Bellingshausen	1969 TE_{2}	Fabian Gottlieb von Bellingshausen (1778–1852), Antarctic explorer, who in 1819–1821 lead the first Russian Antarctic expedition	MPC · 3659
3660 Lazarev	1978 QX_{2}	Mikhail Lazarev (1788–1851), Russian admiral	MPC · 3660
3661 Dolmatovskij	1979 UY_{3}	Yevgeniy Dolmatovsky (1915–1994), Soviet poet	MPC · 3661
3662 Dezhnev	1980 RU_{2}	Semyon Dezhnev (c. 1605–1673), Russian explorer	MPC · 3662
3663 Tisserand	1985 GK_{1}	Félix Tisserand (1845–1896), French astronomer	MPC · 3663
3664 Anneres	4260 P-L	Anna Theresia ("Anneres") Schmadel, wife of German astronomer Lutz D. Schmadel	MPC · 3664
3665 Fitzgerald	1979 FE	Ella Fitzgerald, American jazz singer	MPC · 3665
3666 Holman	1979 HP	Matthew J. Holman, American astronomer	MPC · 3666
3667 Anne-Marie	1981 EF	Anne-Marie Malotki, a friend of the discoverer Edward L. G. Bowell	MPC · 3667
3668 Ilfpetrov	1982 UM_{7}	Ilf and Petrov, Soviet writers	MPC · 3668
3669 Vertinskij	1982 UO_{7}	Alexander Vertinsky (1889–1957), Russian actor, poet and composer	MPC · 3669
3670 Northcott	1983 BN	Ruth J. Northcott (1913–1969), Canadian astronomer	MPC · 3670
3671 Dionysus	1984 KD	Dionysus, Greek god of wine	MPC · 3671
3672 Stevedberg	1985 QQ	Stephen J. Edberg (born 1952), American astronomer	MPC · 3672
3673 Levy	1985 QS	David H. Levy (born 1948), Canadian astronomer and author	MPC · 3673
3674 Erbisbühl	1963 RH	Mountain in Germany and location of the Sonneberg Observatory	MPC · 3674
3675 Kemstach	1982 YP_{1}	Russian Marfa Vladimirovna Kemstach (1888–1971) and Semen Stepanovich Kemstach (1880–1938), grandparents of the discoverer Lyudmila Karachkina	MPC · 3675
3676 Hahn	1984 GA	Gerhard Hahn, planetary astronomer at Uppsala Observatory	MPC · 3676
3677 Magnusson	1984 QJ_{1}	Per Magnusson, planetary astronomer at the Swedish Uppsala Observatory	MPC · 3677
3678 Mongmanwai	1966 BO	Mong Man Wai (1927–2010), Chinese businessman	MPC · 3678
3679 Condruses	1984 DT	Condruzes or Condruses, ancient inhabitants of what is now the Condroz, Belgium	MPC · 3679
3680 Sasha	1987 MY	Alexandra Rachel Druyen Sagan (born 1982), daughter of Carl Sagan and Ann Druyan	MPC · 3680
3681 Boyan	1974 QO_{2}	Boyan, an 11th-century Russian bard at the court of Yaroslav the Wise	MPC · 3681
3682 Welther	A923 NB	Barbara Welther (born 1938), historian of science at the Harvard–Smithsonian Center for Astrophysics	MPC · 3682
3683 Baumann	1987 MA	Paul Baumann (1901–1976) and his wife Helene (1899–1986), German amateur astronomers	MPC · 3683
3684 Berry	1983 AK	Richard Berry, editor-in-chief of Astronomy	MPC · 3684
3685 Derdenye	1981 EH_{14}	Derald and Denise Nye, amateur astronomers in Tucson, Arizona	MPC · 3685
3686 Antoku	1987 EB	Emperor Antoku (1178–1185), Japan	MPC · 3686
3687 Dzus	A908 TC	Paul K. Dzus, assistant and volunteer at the Minor Planet Center in the 1980s	MPC · 3687
3688 Navajo	1981 FD	Navajo, Native American people in Arizona, New Mexico and Utah	MPC · 3688
3689 Yeates	1981 JJ_{2}	Anthony N. Yeates, Australian geologist	MPC · 3689
3690 Larson	1981 PM	Stephen M. Larson, planetary scientist at the Lunar and Planetary Laboratory and a discoverer of minor planets	MPC · 3690
3691 Bede	1982 FT	The Venerable Bede (673–735), English monk and historian	MPC · 3691
3692 Rickman	1982 HF_{1}	Hans Rickman (born 1949), planetary astronomer at Uppsala Observatory	MPC · 3692
3693 Barringer	1982 RU	Daniel Barringer (1860–1929), and pioneer investigator of terrestrial meteorite craters and after whom the Barringer Crater is named	MPC · 3693
3694 Sharon	1984 SH_{5}	Sharon Rachel Vinick, friend of the discoverer Arie William Grossman	MPC · 3694
3695 Fiala	1973 UU_{4}	Alan D. Fiala (born 1942), American staff astronomer with the USNO who became Chief of the U.S. Nautical Almanac Office in 1992	MPC · 3695
3696 Herald	1980 OF	David R. Herald, Australian amateur astronomer	MPC · 3696
3697 Guyhurst	1984 EV	Guy Hurst, British amateur astronomer from Basingstoke, south central England, who has been observing comets since 1970 Src	MPC · 3697
3698 Manning	1984 UA_{2}	Brian G. W. Manning (1926–2011), British amateur cometary astrometrist	MPC · 3698
3699 Milbourn	1984 UC_{2}	Stanley William Milbourn, editor of the circulars of the British Astronomical Association	MPC · 3699
3700 Geowilliams	1984 UL_{2}	George E. Williams, an Australian geologist, who discovered the Acraman crater, a meteorite impact crater in South Australia	MPC · 3700

== 3701–3800 ==
back to top

Named minor planet	Provisional	This minor planet was named for...	Ref · Catalog
3701 Purkyně	1985 DW	Jan Evangelista Purkyně (1787–1869), Czech anatomist, patriot, and physiologist	MPC · 3701
3702 Trubetskaya	1970 NB	Ekaterina Ivanovna Trubetskaya (1800–1854), Russian princess, wife of a Decembrist	MPC · 3702
3703 Volkonskaya	1978 PU_{3}	Mariya Nikolayevna Volkonskaya (1805–1863), Russian princess, wife of a Decembrist	MPC · 3703
3704 Gaoshiqi	1981 YX_{1}	Gao Shi-Qi (1905–1988), the founder of science popularization in China	MPC · 3704
3705 Hotellasilla	1984 ET_{1}	Erich Schumann", long-time manager of the Hotel La Silla" at La Silla Observatory in Chile	MPC · 3705
3706 Sinnott	1984 SE_{3}	Roger W. Sinnott, associate editor of Sky & Telescope	MPC · 3706
3707 Schröter	1934 CC	Johann Hieronymus Schröter (1745–1816), German astronomer and selenographer	MPC · 3707
3708 Socus	1974 FV_{1}	Socus, defending his brother, wounded Odysseus with a spear throw that would have been fatal had not the goddess Athena deflected it. Odysseus then speared Socus in the back and taunted him as he perished.	IAU · 3708
3709 Polypoites	1985 TL_{3}	Polypoites, mythical Greek warrior	MPC · 3709
3710 Bogoslovskij	1978 RD_{6}	Nikita Bogoslovsky (1913–2004), Russian composer and writer	MPC · 3710
3711 Ellensburg	1983 QD	City of Ellensburg, Washington, United States	MPC · 3711
3712 Kraft	1984 YC	Robert Kraft (1927–2015), American professor of astronomy and astrophysics and chairman of the IAU	MPC · 3712
3713 Pieters	1985 FA_{2}	Carle M. Pieters (born 1943), American geologist and planetary scientist	MPC · 3713
3714 Kenrussell	1983 TT_{1}	Kenneth S. Russell, Australian astronomer and a discoverer of minor planets and comets. He has been working with the UK Schmidt Telescope for many years.	MPC · 3714
3715 Štohl	1980 DS	Ján Štohl (1932–1993), Slovak astronomer	MPC · 3715
3716 Petzval	1980 TG	József Miska Petzval (1807–1891), Hungarian engineer and mathematician	MPC · 3716
3717 Thorenia	1964 CG	Victor Eugene Thoren (1935–1991), historian of astronomy at Indiana University	MPC · 3717
3718 Dunbar	1978 VS_{10}	R. Scott Dunbar, American physicist, planetary scientist and discoverer of minor planets	MPC · 3718
3719 Karamzin	1976 YO_{1}	Nikolay Karamzin (1766–1826), Russian historian	MPC · 3719
3720 Hokkaido	1987 UR_{1}	Hokkaidō, Japan	MPC · 3720
3721 Widorn	1982 TU	Thomas Widorn, Austrian astronomer	MPC · 3721
3722 Urata	1927 UE	Takeshi Urata (1947–2012), Japanese astronomer and discoverer of minor planets	MPC · 3722
3723 Voznesenskij	1976 GK_{2}	Andrei Voznesensky (1933–2010), Russian poet	MPC · 3723
3724 Annenskij	1979 YN_{8}	Innokenty Annensky (1855–1909), Russian poet and writer	MPC · 3724
3725 Valsecchi	1981 EA_{11}	Giovanni B. Valsecchi, Italian astronomer at the National Institute for Astrophysics	MPC · 3725
3726 Johnadams	1981 LJ	John Adams (1735–1826), American president	MPC · 3726
3727 Maxhell	1981 PQ	Maximilian Hell (1720–1792), Hungarian astronomer and Jesuit priest	MPC · 3727
3728 IRAS	1983 QF	IRAS, the Infrared Astronomical Satellite	MPC · 3728
3729 Yangzhou	1983 VP_{7}	Yangzhou, Jiangsu, China	MPC · 3729
3730 Hurban	1983 XM_{1}	Jozef Miloslav Hurban (1817–1888), Slovak poet, writer, journalist, editor, critic	MPC · 3730
3731 Hancock	1984 DH_{1}	John Hancock (1737–1793), American politician	MPC · 3731
3732 Vávra	1984 SR_{1}	Anton Alfred Vávra, father of the discoverer	MPC · 3732
3733 Yoshitomo	1985 AF	Minamoto no Yoshitomo (1123–1160), early Japanese samurai	MPC · 3733
3734 Waland	9527 P-L	Robert L. Waland, Scottish optician who developed new techniques for making the optics of Schmidt telescopes	MPC · 3734
3735 Třeboň	1983 XS	Třeboň, Czech Republic	MPC · 3735
3736 Rokoske	1987 SY_{3}	Thomas Leo Rokoske, professor of physics and astronomy at the Appalachian State University in North Carolina	MPC · 3736
3737 Beckman	1983 PA	Arnold O. Beckman (1900–2004), American chemist and inventor of the pH meter	MPC · 3737
3738 Ots	1977 QA_{1}	Georg Ots (1920–1975), Estonian opera singer	MPC · 3738
3739 Rem	1977 RE_{2}	Rem Viktorovich Khokhlov (1926–1977), Soviet physicist and co-founder of nonlinear optics	MPC · 3739
3740 Menge	1981 EM	Sergio Menge de Freitas, vice-director of the Valongo Observatory, Brazil	MPC · 3740
3741 Rogerburns	1981 EL_{19}	Roger Burns (1937–1994), New Zealand mineralogist	MPC · 3741
3742 Sunshine	1981 EQ_{27}	Jessica M. Sunshine, visiting scientist at MIT	MPC · 3742
3743 Pauljaniczek	1983 EW	Paul Janiczek (born 1937), American astronomer	MPC · 3743
3744 Horn-d'Arturo	1983 VE	Guido Horn d'Arturo (1879–1967), Italian astronomer	MPC · 3744
3745 Petaev	1949 SF	Michail Ivanovich Petaev, visiting planetary geologist at Harvard–Smithsonian Center for Astrophysics	MPC · 3745
3746 Heyuan	1964 TC_{1}	Heyuan, Guangdong, China	MPC · 3746
3747 Belinskij	1975 VY_{5}	Vissarion Belinsky (1811–1848), Russian literary critic	MPC · 3747
3748 Tatum	1981 JQ	Jeremy B. Tatum, Canadian astronomer	MPC · 3748
3749 Balam	1982 BG_{1}	David D. Balam, Canadian astronomer and discoverer of minor planets	MPC · 3749
3750 Ilizarov	1982 TD_{1}	Gavriil Ilizarov (1921–1992), Soviet orthopedic surgeon	MPC · 3750
3751 Kiang	1983 NK	Tao Kiang, astronomer at Dunsink Observatory, near Dublin	MPC · 3751
3752 Camillo	1985 PA	Camillo, son of the early Roman King Turno	MPC · 3752
3753 Cruithne	1986 TO	Cruithne, ancient British tribe	MPC · 3753
3754 Kathleen	1931 FM	Kathleen Willoughby Clifford, granddaughter of discoverer Clyde Tombaugh	MPC · 3754
3755 Lecointe	1950 SJ	Georges Lecointe (1869–1929), Belgian astronomer and explorer	MPC · 3755
3756 Ruscannon	1979 MV_{6}	Russell David Cannon, British astronomer	MPC · 3756
3757 Anagolay	1982 XB	Anagolay is the goddess of lost things in ancient Philippine Tagalog mythology. Name suggested by the SGAC Name An Asteroid Campaign	JPL · 3757
3758 Karttunen	1983 WP	Hannu Karttunen, Finnish astronomer	MPC · 3758
3759 Piironen	1984 AP	Jukka Piironen, Finnish astronomer at the Finnish Meteorological Institute in Helsinki	MPC · 3759
3760 Poutanen	1984 AQ	Markku Poutanen, Finnish astronomer and geodesist	MPC · 3760
3761 Romanskaya	1936 OH	Sofia Romanskaya (1886–1969), Russian astronomer	MPC · 3761
3762 Amaravella	1976 QN_{1}	Amaravella group of Russian painters, they represented Russian cosmism style	MPC · 3762
3763 Qianxuesen	1980 TA_{6}	Qian Xuesen (1911–2009), Chinese aerodynamicist and cyberneticist	MPC · 3763
3764 Holmesacourt	1980 TL_{15}	Robert Holmes a Court (1937–1990), Australian lawyer, businessman and collector	MPC · 3764
3765 Texereau	1982 SU_{1}	Jean Texereau, optical engineer in the optical laboratory at Paris Observatory and author of the classic How to Make a Telescope	MPC · 3765
3766 Junepatterson	1983 BF	June C. Patterson (1923–1988) amateur astronomer of Sierra Vista, Arizona	MPC · 3766
3767 DiMaggio	1986 LC	Joe DiMaggio (1914–1999), American baseball player	MPC · 3767
3768 Monroe	1937 RB	Marilyn Monroe (1926–1962), American actress	MPC · 3768
3769 Arthurmiller	1967 UV	Arthur Miller (1915–2005), American playwright, essayist, and author	MPC · 3769
3770 Nizami	1974 QT_{1}	Nizami Ganjavi (1141–1209), Persian poet	MPC · 3770
3771 Alexejtolstoj	1974 SB_{3}	Aleksey Nikolayevich Tolstoy (1883–1945), Russian writer	MPC · 3771
3772 Piaf	1982 UR_{7}	Édith Piaf (1915–1963), French singer	MPC · 3772
3773 Smithsonian	1984 YY	Smithsonian Institution, American museum	MPC · 3773
3774 Megumi	1987 YC	Megumi, wife of Japanese astronomer Takuo Kojima who discovered this minor planet	MPC · 3774
3775 Ellenbeth	1931 TC_{4}	Ellen Elizabeth Willoughby, granddaughter of the discoverer Clyde Tombaugh	MPC · 3775
3776 Vartiovuori	1938 GG	Hill in Turku, Finland on which the first observatory was built by Argelander	MPC · 3776
3777 McCauley	1981 JD_{2}	Francis McCauley, geologist with the USGS	MPC · 3777
3778 Regge	1984 HK_{1}	Tullio Regge (1931–2014), Italian theoretical physicist at Turin University	MPC · 3778
3779 Kieffer	1985 JV_{1}	Hugh H. Kieffer, American geophysicist with the USGS	MPC · 3779
3780 Maury	1985 RL	Alain Maury (born 1958), French astronomer and discoverer of minor planets	MPC · 3780
3781 Dufek	1986 RG_{1}	George J. Dufek (1903–1977), American Antarctic explorer and Rear Admiral	MPC · 3781
3782 Celle	1986 TE	German town of Celle in Lower Saxony	MPC · 3782
3783 Morris	1986 TW_{1}	Charles S. Morris, observer of comets (presumed: Charles S. Morris Observatory)	MPC · 3783
3784 Chopin	1986 UL_{1}	Frédéric Chopin (1810–1849), Polish composer	MPC · 3784
3785 Kitami	1986 WM	Kitami, Japan	MPC · 3785
3786 Yamada	1988 AE	Sakao Yamada, Japanese engineer	MPC · 3786
3787 Aivazovskij	1977 RG_{7}	Ivan Aivazovsky (1817–1900), Russian painter	MPC · 3787
3788 Steyaert	1986 QM_{3}	Christian Steyaert (born 1955), Belgian amateur astronomer, president of the Belgian (Flemish) astronomical society Vereniging voor Sterrenkunde from 1988 to 2004	MPC · 3788
3789 Zhongguo	1928 UF	Chinese name for China	MPC · 3789
3790 Raywilson	1937 UE	Raymond Wilson (1928–2018), astronomical optician and pioneer of active optics	MPC · 3790
3791 Marci	1981 WV_{1}	Jan Marek Marci (1595–1667), Czech medical doctor, physicist, astronomer and natural philosopher	MPC · 3791
3792 Preston	1985 FA	Richard Preston (born 1954), American author of the astronomy book First Light	MPC · 3792
3793 Leonteus	1985 TE_{3}	Leonteus, mythical person related to Trojan War	MPC · 3793
3794 Sthenelos	1985 TF_{3}	Sthenelos, mythical person related to Trojan War	MPC · 3794
3795 Nigel	1986 GV_{1}	Nigel Henbest (born 1951), British author, co-founder of Pioneer TV Productions	JPL · 3795
3796 Lene	1986 XJ	Lene Augustesen, daughter of Danish astronomer Karl Augustesen, college of discoverer Poul Jensen at Brorfelde Observatory	MPC · 3796
3797 Ching-Sung Yu	1987 YL	Ching-Sung Yu, Chinese astronomer	MPC · 3797
3798 de Jager	2402 T-3	Cornelis de Jager (1921–), Dutch astronomer	MPC · 3798
3799 Novgorod	1979 SL_{9}	Novgorod, Russia	MPC · 3799
3800 Karayusuf	1984 AB	Alford S. Karayusuf, supporter of near-Earth asteroid research projects at JPL	MPC · 3800

== 3801–3900 ==
back to top

Named minor planet	Provisional	This minor planet was named for...	Ref · Catalog
3801 Thrasymedes	1985 VS	Thrasymedes, mythical person related to Trojan War	MPC · 3801
3802 Dornburg	1986 PJ_{4}	Dornburg, a German town near the discovering Tautenburg Observatory	MPC · 3802
3803 Tuchkova	1981 TP_{1}	Margarita Mikhailovna Tuchkova (1781–1852), Russian, founder of Spaso-Borodinsky monastery	MPC · 3803
3804 Drunina	1969 TB_{2}	Yulia Drunina (1924–1991), Soviet poet	MPC · 3804
3805 Goldreich	1981 DK_{3}	Peter Goldreich (born 1939), an American astrophysicist	MPC · 3805
3806 Tremaine	1981 EW_{32}	Scott D. Tremaine (born 1950), Canadian astrophysicist	MPC · 3806
3807 Pagels	1981 SE_{1}	Heinz Pagels (1939–1988), an American physicist	MPC · 3807
3808 Tempel	1982 FQ_{2}	Wilhelm Tempel (1821–1889), German astronomer	MPC · 3808
3809 Amici	1984 FA	Giovanni Battista Amici (1786–1863), Italian astronomer	MPC · 3809
3810 Aoraki	1985 DX	Aoraki / Mount Cook is the highest mountain in New Zealand	MPC · 3810
3811 Karma	1953 TH	Karma, Hindu philosophy	MPC · 3811
3812 Lidaksum	1965 AK_{1}	Li Dak-sum, (1920–) Chinese entrepreneur and philanthropist	MPC · 3812
3813 Fortov	1970 QA_{1}	Vladimir Fortov (born 1946), a Russian physicist and expert in thermal physics, shock waves, and plasma physics	MPC · 3813
3814 Hoshi-no-mura	1981 JA	Job training school for disabled persons. "Hoshi no mura" is meaning "Star village" in Japanese	MPC · 3814
3815 König	1959 GG	Arthur König (1895–1969), German astronomer and discoverer of this minor planet. It was named by the other two discoverers, Gerhard Jackisch and Wolfgang Wenzel	MPC · 3815
3816 Chugainov	1975 VG_{9}	Pavel Fedorovich Chugainov (1933–1992), long-time astronomer at the Crimean Astrophysical Observatory	MPC · 3816
3817 Lencarter	1979 MK_{1}	Leonard J. Carter, of the British Interplanetary Society	MPC · 3817
3818 Gorlitsa	1979 QL_{8}	Mariya Avksent'evna Rudenko, a village schoolmistress in the Mohyliv-Podilskyi Raion of Ukraine	MPC · 3818
3819 Robinson	1983 AR	Leif J. Robinson, editor of the monthly American magazine Sky & Telescope	MPC · 3819
3820 Sauval	1984 DV	Henri Sauval (1623–1676), French historian	MPC · 3820
3821 Sonet	1985 RC_{3}	Jean Sonet (1908–1987), a Belgian Jesuit	MPC · 3821
3822 Segovia	1988 DP_{1}	Andrés Segovia (1893–1987), guitarist	MPC · 3822
3823 Yorii	1988 EC_{1}	Yorii, a Japanese town in the Saitama Prefecture	MPC · 3823
3824 Brendalee	1929 TK	Brenda Willoughby Anderson, granddaughter of the American discoverer Clyde Tombaugh	MPC · 3824
3825 Nürnberg	1967 UR	Nuremberg, a city in Germany	MPC · 3825
3826 Handel	1973 UV_{5}	George Frideric Handel (1685–1759), German baroque composer	MPC · 3826
3827 Zdeněkhorský	1986 VU	Zdeněk Horský (1929–1988), Czech historian-astronomer	MPC · 3827
3828 Hoshino	1986 WC	Jiro Hoshino, Japanese amateur astronomer	MPC · 3828
3829 Gunma	1988 EM	Gunma, a prefecture of Japan	MPC · 3829
3830 Trelleborg	1986 RL	Trelleborg, southernmost Swedish city and nearby located Brorfelde Observatory	MPC · 3830
3831 Pettengill	1986 TP_{2}	Gordon Pettengill (1926–2021), an American radio astronomer and planetary physicist at MIT	MPC · 3831
3832 Shapiro	1981 QJ	Irwin I. Shapiro (born 1926), an American astrophysicist and professor at Harvard University	MPC · 3832
3833 Calingasta	1971 SC	Calingasta, department in San Juan, Argentina, where the discovering Leoncito Astronomical Complex is located	MPC · 3833
3834 Zappafrank	1980 JE	Frank Zappa (1940–1993), American musician	MPC · 3834
3835 Korolenko	1977 SD_{3}	Vladimir Korolenko (1853–1921), Russian writer	MPC · 3835
3836 Lem	1979 SR_{9}	Stanisław Lem (1921–2006), Polish writer	MPC · 3836
3837 Carr	1981 JU_{2}	Michael Harold Carr, planetary geologist with the USGS	MPC · 3837
3838 Epona	1986 WA	Epona, Gallo-Roman goddess of horses, ponies, donkeys and mules	MPC · 3838
3839 Bogaevskij	1971 OU	Konstantin Bogaevsky (1872–1943), Russian painter	MPC · 3839
3840 Mimistrobell	1980 TN_{4}	Mary E. Strobell, geologist with the USGS	MPC · 3840
3841 Dicicco	1983 VG_{7}	Dennis DiCicco, editor of Sky & Telescope	MPC · 3841
3842 Harlansmith	1985 FC_{1}	Harlan Smith (1924–1991), American astronomer	MPC · 3842
3843 OISCA	1987 DM	The Organization for Industrial, Spiritual and Cultural Advancement (OISCA),	MPC · 3843
3844 Lujiaxi	1966 BZ	Lu Jiaxi (1915–2001), Chinese physical chemist	MPC · 3844
3845 Neyachenko	1979 SA_{10}	Ilya Isaakovich Neyachenko, Russian journalist and amateur astronomer	MPC · 3845
3846 Hazel	1980 TK_{5}	Hazel Arthur Spellmann (1896–1968), mother of the discoverer Carolyn Shoemaker	MPC · 3846
3847 Šindel	1982 DY_{1}	Jan Šindel (c. 1375 – c. 1456), Czech astronomer, mathematician, medical doctor and professor	MPC · 3847
3848 Analucia	1982 FH_{3}	Ana Lucia Martins, friend of Belgian discoverer Henri Debehogne	MPC · 3848
3849 Incidentia	1984 FC	Roger W. Martin, graduate of the Electrical and Computer Engineering Department at UC and expert in asteroid science	MPC · 3849
3850 Peltier	1986 TK_{2}	Leslie Peltier (1900–1980), American amateur astronomer	MPC · 3850
3851 Alhambra	1986 UZ	Alhambra palace in Spain	MPC · 3851
3852 Glennford	1987 DR_{6}	Glenn Ford (1916–2006), a Canadian actor during Hollywood's Golden Age	MPC · 3852
3853 Haas	1981 WG_{1}	Walter H. Haas (1917–2015), an American amateur astronomer and founder of the Association of Lunar and Planetary Observers (ALPO)	MPC · 3853
3854 George	1983 EA	George Estel Shoemaker (1904–1960), father-in-law of American discoverer Carolyn Shoemaker	MPC · 3854
3855 Pasasymphonia	1986 NF_{1}	The Pasadena Symphony and Pops, an American orchestra based in Pasadena, California	MPC · 3855
3856 Lutskij	1976 QX	Valery Konstantinovich Lutsky, Russian astronomer and scientific commentator on astronomy	MPC · 3856
3857 Cellino	1984 CD_{1}	Alberto Cellino, Italian astronomer at the Observatory of Turin (Pino Torinese)	MPC · 3857
3858 Dorchester	1986 TG	Dorchester, a county town of Dorset in South West England	MPC · 3858
3859 Börngen	1987 EW	Freimut Börngen (1930–2021), German astronomer	MPC · 3859
3860 Plovdiv	1986 PM_{4}	Plovdiv, Bulgaria	MPC · 3860
3861 Lorenz	A910 FA	Konrad Lorenz (1903–1989), Austrian ethologist and 1973 Nobel Prize laureate	MPC · 3861
3862 Agekian	1972 KM	Tateos Agekian, Russian astrophysicist	MPC · 3862
3863 Gilyarovskij	1978 SJ_{3}	Vladimir Gilyarovsky (1853–1935), a Russian writer and newspaper journalist	MPC · 3863
3864 Søren	1986 XF	Soren Augustesen, son of Danish discoverer Poul Jensen	MPC · 3864
3865 Lindbloom	1988 AY_{4}	George G. Lindbloom (1934–1989), artist, designer, writer, cartoonist, teacher, photographer and humorist	MPC · 3865
3866 Langley	1988 BH_{4}	Samuel Pierpont Langley (1834–1906), an American astronomer, physicist, inventor of the bolometer and pioneer of aviation	MPC · 3866
3867 Shiretoko	1988 HG	Shiretoko Peninsula, Japan	MPC · 3867
3868 Mendoza	4575 P-L	Eugenio E. Mendoza V. (born 1928) astronomer and an expert on photometry and spectroscopy	MPC · 3868
3869 Norton	1981 JE	Arthur Philip Norton (1876–1955), British amateur astronomer (Norton's Star Atlas)	MPC · 3869
3870 Mayré	1988 CG_{3}	Mayré Elst, daughter of Belgian discoverer Eric Walter Elst	MPC · 3870
3871 Reiz	1982 DR_{2}	Anders Reiz (1915–2000), a Danish astronomer †	MPC · 3871
3872 Akirafujii	1983 AV	Akira Fujii (born 1941), Japanese astronomer	MPC · 3872
3873 Roddy	1984 WB	David J. Roddy (1932–2002), American astrogeologist, researcher of terrestrial impact craters	MPC · 3873
3874 Stuart	1986 TJ_{1}	Stuart E. Jones, astronomer and photographic specialist at the Lowell Observatory	MPC · 3874
3875 Staehle	1988 KE	Robert L. Staehle, astronautical engineer at JPL	MPC · 3875
3876 Quaide	1988 KJ	William L. Quaide, expert in Solar System exploration at NASA	MPC · 3876
3877 Braes	3108 P-L	Lucien Lucas Eduard Braes (born 1936), Belgian astronomer at Leiden Observatory	MPC · 3877
3878 Jyoumon	1982 VR_{4}	Jōmon period, prehistoric Japan	MPC · 3878
3879 Machar	1983 QA	Josef Svatopluk Machar (1864–1942), Czech writer and poet	MPC · 3879
3880 Kaiserman	1984 WK	Michael Kaiserman, American aeronautical engineer	MPC · 3880
3881 Doumergua	1925 VF	Gaston Doumergue (1863–1937), thirteenth president of France during 1924–1931, and his wife	MPC · 3881
3882 Johncox	1962 RN	John P. Cox (1926–1984), American astronomer, researcher into variable stars	MPC · 3882
3883 Verbano	1972 RQ	Lake Maggiore or Lago Verbàno, located in Italy and Switzerland on the south side of the Alps	MPC · 3883
3884 Alferov	1977 EM_{1}	Zhores Alferov (born 1930), Russian physicist	MPC · 3884
3885 Bogorodskij	1979 HG_{5}	Aleksandr Fyodorovich Bogorodskij (1907–1984), Soviet astrophysicist	MPC · 3885
3886 Shcherbakovia	1981 RU_{3}	Sergej Vasil'evich Shcherbakov (1856–1931), founder of the Nizhegorodskij circle of amateur physicists and astronomers	MPC · 3886
3887 Gerstner	1985 QX	František Josef Gerstner (1756–1832) and his son František Antonín Gerstner (1795–1840), Czech physicist and railway engineers	MPC · 3887
3888 Hoyt	1984 FO	William Graves Hoyt (1921–1985), American journalist and historian	MPC · 3888
3889 Menshikov	1972 RT_{3}	Alexander Danilovich Menshikov (1673–1729), Russian statesman and military leader	MPC · 3889
3890 Bunin	1976 YU_{5}	Ivan Bunin (1870–1953) first Russian writer to win the Nobel Prize for Literature	MPC · 3890
3891 Werner	1981 EY_{31}	Robert A. Werner, aerospace engineer at the University of Texas at Austin	MPC · 3891
3892 Dezsö	1941 HD	Lóránt Dezső, Hungarian astronomer, founder and director of the Observatory for Solar Physics in Debrecen, Hungary	MPC · 3892
3893 DeLaeter	1980 FG_{12}	John DeLaeter, retired professor at Curtin University, Western Australia	MPC · 3893
3894 Williamcooke	1980 PQ_{2}	William Ernest Cooke (1863–1947), an Australian astronomer	MPC · 3894
3895 Earhart	1987 DE	Amelia Earhart (1897–1937; disappeared), an American aviation pioneer	MPC · 3895
3896 Pordenone	1987 WB	Il Pordenone, one of the Italian 16th century masters of painting	MPC · 3896
3897 Louhi	1942 RT	Louhi, the wicked queen of the land known as Pohjola in Finnish	MPC · 3897
3898 Curlewis	1981 SF_{9}	Harold Curlewis (1875–1968), Australian government astronomer and director of the Perth Observatory	JPL · 3898
3899 Wichterle	1982 SN_{1}	Otto Wichterle (1913–1998), Czech chemist and inventor of the contact lens	MPC · 3899
3900 Knežević	1985 RK	Zoran Knežević (born 1949), an astronomer at the Astronomical Observatory of Belgrade	MPC · 3900

== 3901–4000 ==
back to top

Named minor planet	Provisional	This minor planet was named for...	Ref · Catalog
3901 Nanjingdaxue	1958 GQ	Nanjing University	JPL · 3901
3902 Yoritomo	1986 AL	Minamoto no Yoritomo (1147–1199), founder of the Kamakura shogunate, Japan	MPC · 3902
3903 Kliment Ohridski	1987 SV_{2}	Kliment Ohridski (840–916), one of the first Bulgarian philosophers	MPC · 3903
3904 Honda	1988 DQ	Minoru Honda (1913–1990), Japanese astronomer	MPC · 3904
3905 Doppler	1984 QO	Christian Doppler (1803–1853), Austrian mathematician and physicist	JPL · 3905
3906 Chao	1987 KE_{1}	Edward C. T. Chao (1919–2008), American geologist	MPC · 3906
3907 Kilmartin	A904 PC	Pamela M. Kilmartin, New Zealand astronomer and discoverer of minor planets	MPC · 3907
3908 Nyx	1980 PA	Nyx, Greek goddess	JPL · 3908
3909 Gladys	1988 JD_{1}	Gladys Marie Zeigler (1921–1988), mother of discoverer Kenneth W. Zeigler	MPC · 3909
3910 Liszt	1988 SF	Franz Liszt (1811–1886), Hungarian pianist and composer	MPC · 3910
3911 Otomo	1940 QB	Satoru Otomo (born 1957), Japanese amateur astronomer and discoverer of minor planets	MPC · 3911
3912 Troja	1988 SG	Troy, ancient legendary city	MPC · 3912
3913 Chemin	1986 XO_{2}	Henriette and Robert Chemin, librarian, engineer at Paris Observatory, and discoverer of minor planets	MPC · 3913
3914 Kotogahama	1987 SE	Kotogahama, beach in Geisei near Geisei Observatory, Japan	MPC · 3914
3915 Fukushima	1988 PA_{1}	Hisao Fukushima (1911–), amateur astronomer and professor at Hokkaido University, Japan	MPC · 3915
3916 Maeva	1981 QA_{3}	Maeva d'Alloy d'Hocquincourt Vitry (1985–1982), niece of ESO astronomer Patrice Bouchet Vitry	MPC · 3916
3917 Franz Schubert	1961 CX	Franz Schubert (1797–1828), composer	MPC · 3917
3918 Brel	1988 PE_{1}	Jacques Brel (1929–1978), Belgian songwriter and performer	MPC · 3918
3919 Maryanning	1984 DS	Mary Anning (1799–1847), English fossil hunter	MPC · 3919
3920 Aubignan	1948 WF	Aubignan, village in southeastern France	MPC · 3920
3921 Klementʹev	1971 OH	Zahar Ivanovich Klementyev (1903–1994), Russian mathematician	MPC · 3921
3922 Heather	1971 SP_{3}	Heather Couper (1949–2020), British astronomer, writer and broadcaster	MPC · 3922
3923 Radzievskij	1976 SN_{3}	Vladimir Vyacheslavovich Radzievskii, Russian astronomer	MPC · 3923
3924 Birch	1977 CU	Peter V. Birch, astronomer at Perth Observatory	MPC · 3924
3925 Tretʹyakov	1977 SS_{2}	Pavel Tretyakov (1832–1898) and his brother Sergei Mikhailovich Tretyakov (1834–1892), Russian art collectors	MPC · 3925
3926 Ramirez	1978 VQ_{3}	Abel R. Ramirez, manager and host of the Athenaeum at Caltech	MPC · 3926
3927 Feliciaplatt	1981 JA_{2}	Felicia Platt, mother of John Platt, a computer scientist and discoverer of minor planets	MPC · 3927
3928 Randa	1981 PG	Randa small village near Zermatt in the Swiss Alps	MPC · 3928
3929 Carmelmaria	1981 WG_{9}	Carmel Maria Borg, secretary at the Perth Observatory and administrative assistant	MPC · 3929
3930 Vasilev	1982 UV_{10}	Konstantin Vasilyev (1942–1976), Russian painter	MPC · 3930
3931 Batten	1984 EN	Alan H. Batten, Canadian astronomer at the Dominion Astrophysical Observatory in Victoria, British Columbia	MPC · 3931
3932 Edshay	1984 SC_{5}	Edwin L. Shay (1938–1998), educator in Worthington, Ohio, and Syracuse, New York	MPC · 3932
3933 Portugal	1986 EN_{4}	Portugal	MPC · 3933
3934 Tove	1987 DF_{1}	Tove Augustesen, wife of Danish discoverer Karl Augustesen	MPC · 3934
3935 Toatenmongakkai	1987 PB	The Oriental Astronomical Association (Toatenmongakkai) was founded by Issei Yamamoto in 1920	MPC · 3935
3936 Elst	2321 T-3	Eric Walter Elst (born 1936), Belgian astronomer and discoverer of minor planets	MPC · 3936
3937 Bretagnon	1932 EO	Pierre Bretagnon, astronomer at the Bureau des Longitudes in France	MPC · 3937
3938 Chapront	1949 PL	Jean Chapront and Michelle Chapront-Touzé, astronomers at the Bureau des Longitudes in France	MPC · 3938
3939 Huruhata	1953 GO	Masaaki Huruhata (1912–1988), astronomer at Tokyo Astronomical Observatory, Japan	MPC · 3939
3940 Larion	1973 FE_{1}	Larisa Ivanovna Golubkina (1940–2025), Russian actress	MPC · 3940
3941 Haydn	1973 UU_{5}	Joseph Haydn (1732–1809), Austrian composer	MPC · 3941
3942 Churivannia	1977 RH_{7}	Ivan Ivanovich Churyumov (1907–1942) Soviet soldier, and Ivan Ivanovich Churyumov (1929–1988), Soviet philosopher and poet	MPC · 3942
3943 Silbermann	1981 RG_{1}	Gottfried Silbermann (1683–1753), a German builder of keyboard instruments	MPC · 3943
3944 Halliday	1981 WP_{1}	Ian Halliday, Canadian astronomer	MPC · 3944
3945 Gerasimenko	1982 PL	Svetlana Gerasimenko (1945–2025) Soviet comets researcher	MPC · 3945
3946 Shor	1983 EL_{2}	Viktor Abramovich Shor, Soviet minor planet researcher	MPC · 3946
3947 Swedenborg	1983 XD	Emanuel Swedenborg (1688–1772), Swedish scientist, philosopher, poet and theologian	MPC · 3947
3948 Bohr	1985 RF	Niels Henrik David Bohr (1885–1962), Danish physicist	MPC · 3948
3949 Mach	1985 UL	Ernst Mach (1838–1916), Austrian-Czech physicist and philosopher	MPC · 3949
3950 Yoshida	1986 CH	Tougo Yoshida (1864–1918), Japanese toponymist	MPC · 3950
3951 Zichichi	1986 CK_{1}	Antonino Zichichi (born 1929), Italian astrophysicist and protagonist of CERN	MPC · 3951
3952 Russellmark	1986 EM_{2}	Russell Mark Group has assisted Minor Planet Center with editing asteroid citations	MPC · 3952
3953 Perth	1986 VB_{6}	Perth Observatory in Australia	MPC · 3953
3954 Mendelssohn	1987 HU	Felix Mendelssohn (1809–1847), German composer	MPC · 3954
3955 Bruckner	1988 RF_{3}	Anton Bruckner (1824–1896), Austrian composer	MPC · 3955
3956 Caspar	1988 VL_{1}	Caspar Karstensen, grandson of the discoverer Poul Jensen	MPC · 3956
3957 Sugie	1933 OD	Atsushi Sugie, Japanese astronomer	MPC · 3957
3958 Komendantov	1953 TC	Nikolaj Vasil'evich Komendantov (1895–1937), Russian astronomer	MPC · 3958
3959 Irwin	1954 UN_{2}	John B. Irwin, professor of astronomy at Indiana University and protagonist of the Kitt Peak National Observatory site selection	MPC · 3959
3960 Chaliubieju	1955 BG	Cha Liubieju, a friend of the discoverer	MPC · 3960
3961 Arthurcox	1962 OB	Arthur N. Cox, early member of the Indiana Asteroid Program	MPC · 3961
3962 Valyaev	1967 CC	Valerij Ivanovich Valyaev (born 1944), Soviet astronomer at the Institute for Theoretical Astronomy (ITA)	MPC · 3962
3963 Paradzhanov	1969 TP_{2}	Sergei Paradzhanov (1924–1990), Soviet film producer	MPC · 3963
3964 Danilevskij	1974 RG_{1}	Grigory Danilevsky (1829–1890), Russian and Ukrainian writer	MPC · 3964
3965 Konopleva	1975 VA_{9}	Valentina Petrovna Konopleva, astronomer at Main Ukrainian Astronomical Observatory (part of NAN Ukraine)	MPC · 3965
3966 Cherednichenko	1976 SD_{3}	Vladimir Ivanovich Cherednichenko, cometary researcher at Kiev Polytechnic Institute	MPC · 3966
3967 Shekhtelia	1976 YW_{2}	Fyodor Osipovich Shekhtel' (1859–1926), Russian architect	MPC · 3967
3968 Koptelov	1978 TU_{5}	Afanasij Lazarevich Koptelov, Soviet writer	MPC · 3968
3969 Rossi	1978 TQ_{8}	Carlo Rossi (1775–1849), Italian-Russian architect	MPC · 3969
3970 Herran	1979 ME_{9}	Jose Antonio Ruiz de la Herran Villagomez (born 1925), technical advisor of the Museum Universum in Mexico City	MPC · 3970
3971 Voronikhin	1979 YM_{8}	Andrej Nikiforovich Voronikhin (1759–1814), Russian architect	MPC · 3971
3972 Richard	1981 JD_{3}	Richard Arthur Spellmann, brother of discoverer Carolyn Shoemaker, chemist and mayor of El Cerrito, California	MPC · 3972
3973 Ogilvie	1981 UC_{1}	Robert E. Ogilvie (1923–), professor of metallurgy at MIT and a researcher at the Boston Museum of Fine Arts	MPC · 3973
3974 Verveer	1982 FS	Arie J. B. Verveer, Dutch-born astronomer, Director of Perth Observatory in Western Australia	MPC · 3974
3975 Verdi	1982 UR_{3}	Giuseppe Verdi, Italian composer	MPC · 3975
3976 Lise	1983 JM	Lise Melinda Breakey Thomas, daughter-in-law of discoverer Norman G. Thomas	MPC · 3976
3977 Maxine	1983 LM	Maxine Shoemaker Heath, American entomologist, sister of Eugene Shoemaker	MPC · 3977
3978 Klepešta	1983 VP_{1}	Josef Klepešta (1895–1976), Czech astronomer	MPC · 3978
3979 Brorsen	1983 VV_{1}	Theodor Brorsen (1819–1895), Danish astronomer	MPC · 3979
3980 Hviezdoslav	1983 XU	Pavol Országh Hviezdoslav (1849–1921), Slovak poet	MPC · 3980
3981 Stodola	1984 BL	Aurel Stodola (1859–1942), Slovak engineer, physicist, and inventor	MPC · 3981
3982 Kastelʹ	1984 JP_{1}	Galina Richardovna Kastel, Soviet comets researcher and discoverer of minor planets	MPC · 3982
3983 Sakiko	1984 SX	Sakiko Nakano, sister of Japanese astronomer Syuichi Nakano	MPC · 3983
3984 Chacos	1984 SB_{6}	Albert Anthony Chacos (born 1953), an American space engineer, helped further the exploration of the planets as a key engineer for NASA's New Horizons Pluto-Kuiper Belt mission. He also played important roles in other space missions, including the Messenger mission to Mercury	JPL · 3984
3985 Raybatson	1985 CX	Raymond M. Batson, American planetary geologist and cartographer with the United States Geological Survey	MPC · 3985
3986 Rozhkovskij	1985 SF_{2}	Dmitrij Aleksandrovich Rozhkovskij (1915–1991), Soviet astronomer	MPC · 3986
3987 Wujek	1986 EL_{1}	Joseph H. Wujek, American scientist	MPC · 3987
3988 Huma	1986 LA	The Huma bird in Iranian mythology and Sufi poetry is a bird of fortune since its touch, or even sight of its shadow, is said to be auspicious.	JPL · 3988
3989 Odin	1986 RM	Odin, Norse god	MPC · 3989
3990 Heimdal	1987 SO_{3}	Heimdall, Norse god	MPC · 3990
3991 Basilevsky	1987 SW_{3}	Alexandr T. Basilevsky, Soviet planetary geologist	MPC · 3991
3992 Wagner	1987 SA_{7}	Richard Wagner (1813–1883), German composer	MPC · 3992
3993 Šorm	1988 VV_{5}	František Šorm (1913–1980), a Czech chemist, president of the Czechoslovak Academy of Sciences during the International Geophysical Year, and founder of the Institute for Organic Chemistry and Biochemistry in Prague	MPC · 3993
3994 Ayashi	1988 XF	Ayashi, a district of the city of Sendai, Japan	MPC · 3994
3995 Sakaino	1988 XM	Teruo Sakaino (born 1917), glass and ceramics chemist	MPC · 3995
3996 Fugaku	1988 XG_{1}	One of ancient names for Mount Fuji in Japan	MPC · 3996
3997 Taga	1988 XP_{1}	Taga, Shiga, Japan	MPC · 3997
3998 Tezuka	1989 AB	Osamu Tezuka (1928–1989), Japanese manga artist	MPC · 3998
3999 Aristarchus	1989 AL	Aristarchus of Samos, Ancient Greek astronomer and mathematician	MPC · 3999
4000 Hipparchus	1989 AV	Hipparchus, Ancient Greek scientist	MPC · 4000

back to top

Preceded by 2,001–3,000	Meanings of minor-planet names List of minor planets: 3,001–4,000	Succeeded by 4,001–5,000
