= 3700 Geowilliams =

Main-belt asteroid

Discovery
- Discovered by: C. Shoemaker; E. Shoemaker
- Discovery site: Palomar Obs.
- Discovery date: 23 October 1984

Designations
- Named after: George E. Williams (Australian geologist)
- Alternative designations: 1984 UL_{2} · 1973 YF_{2} 1977 UJ
- Minor planet category: main-belt · (inner) background

Orbital characteristics
- Epoch 23 March 2018 (JD 2458200.5)
- Uncertainty parameter 0
- Observation arc: 43.54 yr (15,902 d)
- Aphelion: 2.9602 AU
- Perihelion: 1.8695 AU
- Semi-major axis: 2.4148 AU
- Eccentricity: 0.2258
- Orbital period (sidereal): 3.75 yr (1,371 d)
- Mean anomaly: 293.18°
- Mean motion: 0° 15^{m} 45.36^{s} / day
- Inclination: 12.121°
- Longitude of ascending node: 289.16°
- Argument of perihelion: 153.06°

Physical characteristics
- Mean diameter: 7.712±0.130 km 7.74±1.83 km 7.753±0.152 km 8.70±0.30 km 8.82±0.86 km 8.97 km (calculated)
- Synodic rotation period: 14.383±0.0183 h 14.387±0.003 h (Note: David Higgins (2011): rotation period 14.387±0.003 hours with a brightness amplitude of 0.40±0.02 mag. Quality code is 3. Summary figures for (3700) Geowilliams at the LCDB and archived website of the Hunters Hill Observatory by David Higgins.)
- Geometric albedo: 0.20 (assumed); 0.227±0.045; 0.23±0.13; 0.233±0.033; 0.2970±0.0516
- Spectral type: SMASS = S k
- Absolute magnitude (H): 12.443±0.002 (R); 12.50; 12.6; 12.89; 12.94±0.46

3700 Geowilliams, provisional designation 1984 UL_{2}, is a stony background asteroid from the inner regions of the asteroid belt, approximately 8 kilometers (5 miles) in diameter. It was discovered on 23 October 1984, by American astronomer couple Carolyn and Eugene Shoemaker at the Palomar Observatory in California, United States. The S k-subtype has a rotation period of 14.38 hours. It was named for Australian geologist George E. Williams.

== Orbit and classification ==
Geowilliams is a non-family asteroid from the main belt's background population. It orbits the Sun in the inner main-belt at a distance of 1.9–3.0 AU once every 3 years and 9 months (1,371 days; semi-major axis of 2.41 AU). Its orbit has an eccentricity of 0.23 and an inclination of 12° with respect to the ecliptic. The body's observation arc begins with its first observation as 1973 YF_{2} at Crimea-Nauchnij in December 1973, almost 11 years prior to its official discovery observation at Palomar.

== Physical characteristics ==
In the SMASS classification, Geowilliams is a Sk-subtype that transitions between the common S-type asteroid and the K-type asteroid. The latter spectral type is often found among members of the Eos family.

=== Rotation period ===
In January 2008, a rotational lightcurve of Geowilliams was obtained from photometric observations by Australian amateur astronomer David Higgins at the Hunters Hill Observatory (E14). Lightcurve analysis gave a well-defined rotation period of 14.387 hours with a brightness variation of 0.40 magnitude (U=3). In July 2010, a similar period of 14.383 hours and an amplitude of 0.42 was measured at the Palomar Transient Factory in California (U=2).

=== Diameter and albedo ===
According to the surveys carried out by the Japanese Akari satellite and the NEOWISE mission of NASA's Wide-field Infrared Survey Explorer, Geowilliams measures between 7.712 and 8.82 kilometers in diameter and its surface has an albedo between 0.227 and 0.297.

The Collaborative Asteroid Lightcurve Link assumes a standard albedo for a stony asteroid of 0.20, and calculates a diameter of 8.97 kilometers based on an absolute magnitude of 12.6.

== Naming ==
This minor planet was named after Australian geologist George E. Williams who discovered the Acraman crater when he worked for BHP in South Australia. The old 90-kilometer impact structure is one of the largest meteorite impact craters known on Earth and the largest one on the Australian continent. The official naming citation was published by the Minor Planet Center on 2 February 1988 (M.P.C. 12810).
