= 3754 Kathleen =

Large background asteroid

Discovery
- Discovered by: C. W. Tombaugh
- Discovery site: Lowell Obs.
- Discovery date: 16 March 1931

Designations
- Named after: Kathleen Clifford (Discoverer's granddaughter)
- Alternative designations: 1931 FM · 1925 BF; 1929 WA_{1} · 1955 MR; 1957 WH_{1} · 1959 CH_{1} 1959 EC_{1} · 1963 WD; 1977 KR · 1978 NM_{2} 1982 DQ_{4} · 1985 UD_{4} 1987 BK · A909 HE
- Minor planet category: main-belt · (outer) background

Orbital characteristics
- Epoch 23 March 2018 (JD 2458200.5)
- Uncertainty parameter 0
- Observation arc: 108.53 yr (39,639 d)
- Aphelion: 3.4993 AU
- Perihelion: 2.8168 AU
- Semi-major axis: 3.1581 AU
- Eccentricity: 0.1081
- Orbital period (sidereal): 5.61 yr (2,050 d)
- Mean anomaly: 157.55°
- Mean motion: 0° 10^{m} 32.16^{s} / day
- Inclination: 8.4535°
- Longitude of ascending node: 110.50°
- Argument of perihelion: 55.593°

Physical characteristics
- Mean diameter: 53.03 km (derived); 53.23±1.8 km 53.699±0.248 km 54.283±1.200 km 57.27±0.69 km 58.64±20.04 km 59.367±14.24 km
- Synodic rotation period: 11.16±0.01 h 11.17±0.02 h 11.18±0.01 h 11.2±0.1 h
- Geometric albedo: 0.0379±0.0217; 0.04±0.01; 0.0435 (derived); 0.054±0.002; 0.0599±0.0072; 0.061±0.006; 0.0624±0.005
- Spectral type: C (assumed)
- Absolute magnitude (H): 10.00; 10.30; 10.40

3754 Kathleen, provisional designation 1931 FM, is a large background asteroid from the outer regions of the asteroid belt, approximately 55 kilometers (34 miles) in diameter. It was discovered at the Lowell Observatory near Flagstaff, Arizona, on 16 March 1931, by American astronomer Clyde Tombaugh, who named it after his granddaughter Kathleen Clifford. The assumed C-type asteroid has a rotation period of 11.18 hours. It is the second-highest numbered main-belt asteroid larger than 50 kilometers.

== Orbit and classification ==
Kathleen is a non-family asteroid from the main belt's background population. It orbits the Sun in the outer main-belt at a distance of 2.8–3.5 AU once every 5 years and 7 months (2,050 days; semi-major axis of 3.16 AU). Its orbit has an eccentricity of 0.11 and an inclination of 8° with respect to the ecliptic. The body's observation arc begins with its first observations as A909 HE at Heidelberg Observatory in April 1909, nearly 22 years prior to its official discovery observation at Flagstaff.

== Physical characteristics ==
Kathleen is an assumed carbonaceous C-type asteroid.

=== Rotation period ===
Several rotational lightcurves of Kathleen have been obtained from photometric observations since March 2004. Analysis of the best-rated lightcurve gave a rotation period of 11.18 hours with a consolidated brightness amplitude between 0.13 and 0.20 magnitude (U=3-).

=== Diameter and albedo ===
According to the surveys carried out by the Infrared Astronomical Satellite IRAS, the Japanese Akari satellite and the NEOWISE mission of NASA's Wide-field Infrared Survey Explorer, Kathleen measures between 53.23 and 59.367 kilometers in diameter and its surface has an albedo between 0.0379 and 0.0624.

The Collaborative Asteroid Lightcurve Link derives an albedo of 0.0435 and a diameter of 53.03 kilometers based on an absolute magnitude of 10.4. Besides 3925 Tretʹyakov, it is the highest numbered main-belt asteroid larger than 50 kilometers in diameter, of which there are 642 bodies in total, according to the JPL SBDB.

== Naming ==
This minor planet was named after Kathleen Willoughby Clifford, granddaughter of the discoverer Clyde Tombaugh (1906–1997). The official naming citation was published by the Minor Planet Center on 28 May 1991 (M.P.C. 18306).
