= 3682 Welther =

Background asteroid

Discovery
- Discovered by: K. Reinmuth
- Discovery site: Heidelberg Obs.
- Discovery date: 12 July 1923

Designations
- Named after: Barbara Welther (American historian of science)
- Alternative designations: A923 NB · 1951 YO; 1978 NP_{3} · 1984 AA
- Minor planet category: main-belt · (middle) background

Orbital characteristics
- Epoch 23 March 2018 (JD 2458200.5)
- Uncertainty parameter 0
- Observation arc: 94.79 yr (34,621 d)
- Aphelion: 3.6413 AU
- Perihelion: 1.8769 AU
- Semi-major axis: 2.7591 AU
- Eccentricity: 0.3197
- Orbital period (sidereal): 4.58 yr (1,674 d)
- Mean anomaly: 210.16°
- Mean motion: 0° 12^{m} 54.36^{s} / day
- Inclination: 13.579°
- Longitude of ascending node: 255.47°
- Argument of perihelion: 113.95°

Physical characteristics
- Mean diameter: 11.13±3.57 km 16.83±4.95 km 19.087±0.229 km 19.24 km (derived); 19.257±0.110 km 19.32±0.7 km 19.34±0.30 km
- Synodic rotation period: 3.595±0.003 h 3.597 h 3.5973±0.0001 h 3.5973±0.0003 h (Note: Lightcurve plot of 3682 Welther, Palmer Divide Observatory, B. D. Warner (2001); Collaboration with R.D. Stephens (lead), P. Pravec, P. Kusnirak, et al. Only PDO data are shown. Rotation period 3.5973 hours with a brightness amplitude of 0.21±0.01 mag. Also see summary at the LCDB); 3.599±0.003 h
- Geometric albedo: 0.0997 (derived); 0.1189±0.009; 0.1198±0.0132; 0.120±0.004; 0.133±0.123; 0.138±0.016; 0.26±0.18
- Spectral type: C (assumed)
- Absolute magnitude (H): 11.50; 11.68; 11.7; 11.86; 12.39±0.52

3682 Welther, provisional designation A923 NB, is a background asteroid from the central regions of the asteroid belt, approximately 19 kilometers (12 miles) in diameter. It was discovered on 12 July 1923, by German astronomer Karl Reinmuth at the Heidelberg Observatory in southwest Germany. The asteroid has a rotation period of 3.6 hours. It was named after Barbara Welther, an American historian of science at CfA.

== Orbit and classification ==
Welther is a non-family asteroid from the main belt's background population. It orbits the Sun in the central main-belt at a distance of 1.9–3.6 AU once every 4 years and 7 months (1,674 days; semi-major axis of 2.76 AU). Its orbit has an eccentricity of 0.32 and an inclination of 14° with respect to the ecliptic.

The body's observation arc begins at Heidelber and Vienna Observatory in August 1928, or four weeks after its official discovery observation at Heidelberg.

== Physical characteristics ==
Welther is an assumed C-type asteroid.

=== Rotation period ===
Several rotational lightcurves of Welther have been obtained from photometric observations since 2001. Analysis of the best-rated lightcurves gave a rotation period of 3.5973 hours with a brightness amplitude of 0.22 and 0.21 magnitude, respectively (U=3-/3). The observing French amateur astronomers also suspected the asteroid to be a binary system.

=== Diameter and albedo ===
According to the surveys carried out by the Infrared Astronomical Satellite IRAS, the Japanese Akari satellite and the NEOWISE mission of NASA's Wide-field Infrared Survey Explorer, Welther measures between 11.13 and 19.34 kilometers in diameter and its surface has an albedo between 0.1189 and 0.26.

The Collaborative Asteroid Lightcurve Link derives an albedo of 0.0997 and a diameter of 19.24 kilometers based on an absolute magnitude of 11.7.

== Naming ==
This minor planet was named after American Barbara Welther (born 1938), a historian of science at the Harvard–Smithsonian Center for Astrophysics (CfA). The official naming citation was proposed by CfA's Planetary Sciences division and published by the Minor Planet Center on 1 September 1993 (M.P.C. 22499).
