= Sarah J. Hill =

American astronomer (1909–1996)

Sarah Jeannette Hill (1909–1996) was an American astronomer, the former Lewis Atterbury Stimson Professor of astronomy at Wellesley College.

== Education and career ==
Hill was born in 1909 in Concord, Massachusetts. She was an undergraduate at Smith College, graduating in 1929, and worked from 1929 to 1934 at Bell Labs. After this, she became an instructor of physics and astronomy at Hunter College, and completed a Ph.D. at Columbia University in 1942.

For the remainder of World War II, Hill remained at Columbia, calculating ballistic table in the university's Division of War Research. After the war, she worked for the university's Rutherfurd Observatory, where her research involved measuring and cataloguing the magnitudes of northern-hemisphere stars. From 1950 to 1952 she taught at Wheaton College (Massachusetts), and in 1952 she joined Wellesley College as director of its astronomical observatory and chair of the astronomy department. She stepped down as director and chair in 1971, and retired as Lewis Atterbury Stimson Professor in 1974.

She died on February 13, 1996, in Natick, Massachusetts.

== Recognition ==
Williams was elected as a Fellow of the American Association for the Advancement of Science in 1955.

Asteroid 3065 Sarahill was named for her in 1987, honoring "her enthusiasm for teaching and for observational astronomy", and noting her encouragement of many students to go on to graduate study and careers in astronomy.
