= Zhang Guoxi =

Chinese politician (born 1952)

- 张果喜
- Born: 1952 (age 72–73)
- Citizenship: China
- Occupations: industrialist, philanthropist

Zhang Guoxi (born 1952, Chinese: 张果喜) is a Han Chinese entrepreneur and political figure in the China, and a member of the Ninth, Tenth, and Eleventh National Committees of the Chinese People's Political Consultative Conference (CPPCC).

He joined the Chinese Communist Party, and served as a Standing Committee Member of the All-China Federation of Industry and Commerce (ACFIC), Vice Chairman of the Jiangxi Provincial Federation of Industry and Commerce, and Chairman of Jiangxi Guoxi Group.

In 2008, he was elected as a member of the 11th National Committee of the Chinese People's Political Consultative Conference (CPPCC) and represented the All-China Federation of Industry and Commerce, assigned to the 22nd group.
