= Motrya Bratiychuk =

Ukrainian astronomer

Matrona (Motrya) Vasylivna Bratiychuk (published as M. V. Bratijchuk, Ukrainian: Братійчук Мотря Василівна, 8 September 1927 – 4 April 2001) was a Ukrainian astronomer, one of the first devoted to the observation of artificial satellites.

== Life ==
Bratiychuk was born on 8 September 1927 in Verba, a village in the Dubno Raion of Ukraine, at the time part of the Soviet Union. After earning a degree in 1952 from Taras Shevchenko National University of Kyiv, she became a secondary school teacher for a year before continuing her graduate education.

In 1956 or 1957, she became an assistant in the faculty of physics and mathematics of Uzhhorod National University, and in 1959 she earned a candidate degree, later progressing through the academic ranks to full professor in 1991. In 1957 she founded and headed the university's Station for Optical Observations of Earth's Artificial Satellites in 1957, and in 1969 this became the Laboratory for Space Research of the university.

She died on April 4, 2001, in Uzhhorod.

== Research ==
Inspired by the launch of Sputnik 1 in 1957, Bratiychuk began the observational study of artificial satellites, including work on recognizing them, understanding the forces affecting their orbits, studying how their shape and orientation affects the light reflected from them, and understanding the effects of the atmosphere on radio communications with satellites. As well, she applied her observational expertise to small natural bodies in the Solar System including asteroids, comets, and meteors.

== Recognition ==
Bratiychuk is the namesake of asteroid 3372 Bratijchuk, discovered in 1976.

She was honored by awards from the Ukrainian Astronomical Association and the Academy of Sciences of the USSR, and was named an honorary member of the Ukrainian Astronomical Association.
