= Vladimir Prokofiev =

Soviet physicist

- Born: Vladimir Konstantinovich Prokofiev; 1898
- Died: 1993 (aged 94-95)
- Awards: Stalin Prize
- Scientific career
- Fields: Optics, spectroscopy
- Institutions: College of Precise Mechanics and Optics; Institute for Precise Mechanics and Optics
- Academic advisors: Dimitri Rozhdestvensky

Vladimir Konstantinovich Prokofiev (Russian: Владимир Константинович Прокофьев, 1898–1993) was a Soviet scientist, known for his work on atomic emission spectroscopy.

== Biography ==
Vladimir Prokofiev graduated from Mikhailovsky Artillery School (Russian: Михайловское артиллерийское училище) in 1917 and Saint Petersburg State University in 1924. He was a student of Russian academic Dimitri Rozhdestvensky.

From 1919 up to 1956 he had been working in the State Optics Institute. He was an assistant up to 1932, when he got promoted to a researcher position and Head of the Spectroscopy Sector position. In 1935 he became the head of the Spectral Analysis Laboratory.

At the same time, he lectured at Saint Petersburg State University (1925-1932), Academy of Artillery (1930-1937) and in LITMO. In LITMO he was the Head of the Spectroscopy Department (1951-1953) and the Head of the Optics and Spectroscopy Department (1953-1956).

Prokofiev earned his PhD in 1936 and became a professor in 1944.

He moved to Crimea in 1956 to improve his health and was employed by the Crimean Astrophysical Observatory. He was buried at a cemetery in Nauchnyi.

== Awards and honors ==
- Four Orders of the Red Banner of Labour (1943, 1951, 1954, 1968)
- Stalin Prize, 3rd class (1950)
- Order of Lenin (1953)
- Order of the Red Star (1967)
- USSR State Prize (1971)
- Order of the October Revolution (1978)
