= List of minor planets: 750001–751000 =

The following is a partial list of minor planets, running from minor-planet number 750001 through 751000, inclusive. The primary data for this and other partial lists is based on JPL's "Small-Body Orbital Elements" and data available from the Minor Planet Center. Critical list information is also provided by the MPC, unless otherwise specified from Lowell Observatory. A detailed description of the table's columns and additional sources are given on the main page including a complete list of every page in this series, and a statistical break-up on the dynamical classification of minor planets.

Also see the summary list of all named bodies in numerical and alphabetical order, and the corresponding naming citations for the number range of this particular list. New namings may only be added to this list after official publication, as the preannouncement of names is condemned by the Working Group for Small Bodies Nomenclature of the International Astronomical Union.

Near-Earth obj.	MBA (inner)	MBA (outer)	Centaur
Mars-crosser	MBA (middle)	Jupiter trojan	Trans-Neptunian obj.
Unclassified

== 750001–750100 ==
Designation			Discovery			Properties		Ref
Permanent	Provisional	Named after	Date	Site	Discoverer(s)	Category	Diam.	Ref
750001	2014 QA_{322}	—	August 25, 2014	Haleakala	Pan-STARRS 1	·	1.6 km	MPC · JPL
750002	2014 QM_{326}	—	March 12, 2010	Mount Lemmon	Mount Lemmon Survey	·	580 m	MPC · JPL
750003	2014 QT_{326}	—	August 25, 2014	Haleakala	Pan-STARRS 1	·	1.6 km	MPC · JPL
750004	2014 QU_{326}	—	August 25, 2014	Haleakala	Pan-STARRS 1	·	530 m	MPC · JPL
750005	2014 QY_{326}	—	September 23, 2009	Mount Lemmon	Mount Lemmon Survey	·	1.5 km	MPC · JPL
750006	2014 QR_{327}	—	August 25, 2014	Haleakala	Pan-STARRS 1	·	1.9 km	MPC · JPL
750007	2014 QX_{327}	—	January 19, 2012	Haleakala	Pan-STARRS 1	·	1.4 km	MPC · JPL
750008	2014 QH_{332}	—	March 22, 2012	Mount Lemmon	Mount Lemmon Survey	·	1.8 km	MPC · JPL
750009	2014 QP_{333}	—	August 25, 2014	Haleakala	Pan-STARRS 1	·	1.4 km	MPC · JPL
750010	2014 QH_{334}	—	August 6, 2014	Haleakala	Pan-STARRS 1	H	470 m	MPC · JPL
750011	2014 QC_{336}	—	August 25, 2014	Haleakala	Pan-STARRS 1	EOS	1.5 km	MPC · JPL
750012	2014 QW_{336}	—	July 31, 2014	Haleakala	Pan-STARRS 1	·	1.4 km	MPC · JPL
750013	2014 QM_{339}	—	July 28, 2014	Tivoli	G. Lehmann, ~Knöfel, A.	·	1.4 km	MPC · JPL
750014	2014 QF_{340}	—	June 3, 2014	Haleakala	Pan-STARRS 1	·	1.6 km	MPC · JPL
750015	2014 QP_{340}	—	August 30, 2005	Kitt Peak	Spacewatch	·	1.7 km	MPC · JPL
750016	2014 QK_{341}	—	January 19, 2012	Haleakala	Pan-STARRS 1	·	2.7 km	MPC · JPL
750017	2014 QK_{349}	—	February 27, 2012	Haleakala	Pan-STARRS 1	·	2.6 km	MPC · JPL
750018	2014 QO_{351}	—	August 20, 2014	Haleakala	Pan-STARRS 1	·	1.3 km	MPC · JPL
750019	2014 QE_{355}	—	August 27, 2014	Haleakala	Pan-STARRS 1	·	520 m	MPC · JPL
750020	2014 QM_{355}	—	July 30, 2014	Haleakala	Pan-STARRS 1	·	490 m	MPC · JPL
750021	2014 QQ_{355}	—	August 27, 2014	Haleakala	Pan-STARRS 1	H	370 m	MPC · JPL
750022	2014 QH_{359}	—	November 14, 2006	Mount Lemmon	Mount Lemmon Survey	(5)	1.1 km	MPC · JPL
750023	2014 QF_{361}	—	March 27, 2012	Mount Lemmon	Mount Lemmon Survey	·	3.0 km	MPC · JPL
750024	2014 QK_{363}	—	August 31, 2011	Siding Spring	SSS	·	820 m	MPC · JPL
750025	2014 QX_{366}	—	November 9, 2004	Catalina	CSS	(883)	570 m	MPC · JPL
750026	2014 QX_{368}	—	August 20, 2014	Haleakala	Pan-STARRS 1	ADE	2.1 km	MPC · JPL
750027	2014 QV_{370}	—	September 10, 2010	Kitt Peak	Spacewatch	·	1.6 km	MPC · JPL
750028	2014 QL_{371}	—	November 25, 2011	Haleakala	Pan-STARRS 1	·	490 m	MPC · JPL
750029	2014 QF_{372}	—	August 26, 2014	Tenerife	ESA OGS	·	530 m	MPC · JPL
750030	2014 QF_{374}	—	July 11, 2004	Palomar	NEAT	·	520 m	MPC · JPL
750031	2014 QZ_{374}	—	September 22, 2009	Mount Lemmon	Mount Lemmon Survey	·	2.0 km	MPC · JPL
750032 Jinca	2014 QB_{375}	Jinca	July 29, 2014	La Palma	EURONEAR	·	1.7 km	MPC · JPL
750033	2014 QG_{375}	—	October 1, 2003	Kitt Peak	Spacewatch	TIR	2.7 km	MPC · JPL
750034	2014 QN_{376}	—	August 27, 2014	Haleakala	Pan-STARRS 1	·	1.6 km	MPC · JPL
750035	2014 QF_{377}	—	September 22, 2009	Kitt Peak	Spacewatch	·	1.3 km	MPC · JPL
750036	2014 QT_{377}	—	August 25, 2004	Kitt Peak	Spacewatch	·	570 m	MPC · JPL
750037	2014 QF_{383}	—	September 23, 2008	Mount Lemmon	Mount Lemmon Survey	·	3.2 km	MPC · JPL
750038	2014 QU_{388}	—	July 29, 2014	Haleakala	Pan-STARRS 1	·	2.2 km	MPC · JPL
750039	2014 QM_{389}	—	August 29, 2014	Mount Lemmon	Mount Lemmon Survey	·	1.2 km	MPC · JPL
750040	2014 QR_{391}	—	March 11, 2008	Catalina	CSS	H	370 m	MPC · JPL
750041	2014 QS_{394}	—	September 25, 2009	Kitt Peak	Spacewatch	·	1.9 km	MPC · JPL
750042	2014 QG_{395}	—	August 27, 2014	Haleakala	Pan-STARRS 1	·	1.5 km	MPC · JPL
750043	2014 QS_{400}	—	August 4, 2014	Haleakala	Pan-STARRS 1	·	2.5 km	MPC · JPL
750044	2014 QT_{400}	—	October 28, 2010	Mount Lemmon	Mount Lemmon Survey	·	1.4 km	MPC · JPL
750045	2014 QK_{404}	—	August 28, 2014	Haleakala	Pan-STARRS 1	·	1.1 km	MPC · JPL
750046	2014 QQ_{405}	—	January 19, 2012	Haleakala	Pan-STARRS 1	·	2.1 km	MPC · JPL
750047	2014 QZ_{409}	—	June 3, 2014	Haleakala	Pan-STARRS 1	·	1.3 km	MPC · JPL
750048	2014 QC_{411}	—	September 27, 2009	Kitt Peak	Spacewatch	THM	1.7 km	MPC · JPL
750049	2014 QG_{411}	—	March 13, 2013	Mount Lemmon	Mount Lemmon Survey	·	910 m	MPC · JPL
750050	2014 QR_{411}	—	July 25, 2014	Haleakala	Pan-STARRS 1	·	1.4 km	MPC · JPL
750051	2014 QU_{418}	—	August 30, 2014	Kitt Peak	Spacewatch	·	1.5 km	MPC · JPL
750052	2014 QU_{419}	—	September 18, 2009	Kitt Peak	Spacewatch	·	1.1 km	MPC · JPL
750053	2014 QJ_{423}	—	February 14, 2013	Haleakala	Pan-STARRS 1	·	1.5 km	MPC · JPL
750054	2014 QH_{424}	—	October 29, 2010	Mount Lemmon	Mount Lemmon Survey	·	1.5 km	MPC · JPL
750055	2014 QX_{424}	—	June 30, 2014	Haleakala	Pan-STARRS 1	·	1.7 km	MPC · JPL
750056	2014 QT_{425}	—	August 31, 2014	Kitt Peak	Spacewatch	·	590 m	MPC · JPL
750057	2014 QV_{425}	—	November 2, 2010	Mount Lemmon	Mount Lemmon Survey	·	1.5 km	MPC · JPL
750058	2014 QL_{426}	—	August 31, 2014	Kitt Peak	Spacewatch	·	940 m	MPC · JPL
750059	2014 QM_{427}	—	September 4, 2007	Mount Lemmon	Mount Lemmon Survey	·	550 m	MPC · JPL
750060	2014 QB_{428}	—	September 15, 1998	Kitt Peak	Spacewatch	EOS	1.4 km	MPC · JPL
750061	2014 QU_{432}	—	July 2, 2008	Kitt Peak	Spacewatch	·	2.7 km	MPC · JPL
750062	2014 QH_{445}	—	August 22, 2014	Haleakala	Pan-STARRS 1	·	1.5 km	MPC · JPL
750063	2014 QB_{446}	—	August 25, 2014	Haleakala	Pan-STARRS 1	·	1.9 km	MPC · JPL
750064	2014 QF_{448}	—	November 1, 2005	Mount Lemmon	Mount Lemmon Survey	KOR	950 m	MPC · JPL
750065	2014 QM_{451}	—	October 26, 2005	Kitt Peak	Spacewatch	·	2.0 km	MPC · JPL
750066	2014 QX_{451}	—	April 5, 2008	Mount Lemmon	Mount Lemmon Survey	BRA	990 m	MPC · JPL
750067	2014 QA_{452}	—	August 23, 2014	Haleakala	Pan-STARRS 1	·	1.6 km	MPC · JPL
750068	2014 QG_{452}	—	August 27, 2014	Haleakala	Pan-STARRS 1	KOR	1.3 km	MPC · JPL
750069	2014 QK_{453}	—	September 15, 2009	Mount Lemmon	Mount Lemmon Survey	·	1.5 km	MPC · JPL
750070	2014 QP_{455}	—	October 25, 2005	Mount Lemmon	Mount Lemmon Survey	·	1.3 km	MPC · JPL
750071	2014 QS_{456}	—	February 8, 2011	Mount Lemmon	Mount Lemmon Survey	VER	2.3 km	MPC · JPL
750072	2014 QB_{458}	—	November 20, 2003	Kitt Peak	Spacewatch	·	3.2 km	MPC · JPL
750073	2014 QX_{459}	—	August 20, 2014	Haleakala	Pan-STARRS 1	·	1.3 km	MPC · JPL
750074	2014 QD_{460}	—	August 20, 2014	Haleakala	Pan-STARRS 1	KOR	1 km	MPC · JPL
750075	2014 QB_{461}	—	August 20, 2014	Haleakala	Pan-STARRS 1	·	2.3 km	MPC · JPL
750076	2014 QF_{461}	—	August 18, 2009	Kitt Peak	Spacewatch	·	1.9 km	MPC · JPL
750077	2014 QR_{461}	—	August 20, 2014	Haleakala	Pan-STARRS 1	·	1.7 km	MPC · JPL
750078	2014 QB_{462}	—	October 17, 2010	Mount Lemmon	Mount Lemmon Survey	·	1.5 km	MPC · JPL
750079	2014 QU_{462}	—	August 22, 2014	Haleakala	Pan-STARRS 1	·	1.6 km	MPC · JPL
750080	2014 QJ_{463}	—	August 22, 2014	Haleakala	Pan-STARRS 1	·	1.8 km	MPC · JPL
750081	2014 QU_{463}	—	August 22, 2014	Haleakala	Pan-STARRS 1	EUN	1.1 km	MPC · JPL
750082	2014 QV_{463}	—	August 22, 2014	Haleakala	Pan-STARRS 1	EOS	1.6 km	MPC · JPL
750083	2014 QZ_{463}	—	August 22, 2014	Haleakala	Pan-STARRS 1	·	1.7 km	MPC · JPL
750084	2014 QO_{465}	—	August 23, 2014	Haleakala	Pan-STARRS 1	·	1.4 km	MPC · JPL
750085	2014 QR_{466}	—	August 25, 2014	Haleakala	Pan-STARRS 1	THB	2.7 km	MPC · JPL
750086	2014 QN_{467}	—	March 13, 2013	Mount Lemmon	Mount Lemmon Survey	·	1.3 km	MPC · JPL
750087	2014 QT_{467}	—	August 27, 2014	Haleakala	Pan-STARRS 1	·	1.4 km	MPC · JPL
750088	2014 QV_{470}	—	September 16, 2009	Mount Lemmon	Mount Lemmon Survey	·	2.1 km	MPC · JPL
750089	2014 QW_{470}	—	August 28, 2014	Haleakala	Pan-STARRS 1	·	1.9 km	MPC · JPL
750090	2014 QZ_{470}	—	August 28, 2014	Haleakala	Pan-STARRS 1	·	2.4 km	MPC · JPL
750091	2014 QS_{471}	—	August 30, 2014	Haleakala	Pan-STARRS 1	·	1.5 km	MPC · JPL
750092	2014 QM_{473}	—	August 31, 2014	Haleakala	Pan-STARRS 1	·	2.2 km	MPC · JPL
750093	2014 QA_{474}	—	December 4, 2010	Mount Lemmon	Mount Lemmon Survey	·	860 m	MPC · JPL
750094	2014 QZ_{475}	—	September 27, 2009	Mount Lemmon	Mount Lemmon Survey	URS	3.5 km	MPC · JPL
750095	2014 QQ_{477}	—	September 29, 2005	Kitt Peak	Spacewatch	·	1.3 km	MPC · JPL
750096	2014 QJ_{479}	—	January 25, 2011	Mount Lemmon	Mount Lemmon Survey	·	2.0 km	MPC · JPL
750097	2014 QJ_{481}	—	February 10, 2008	Kitt Peak	Spacewatch	·	1.4 km	MPC · JPL
750098	2014 QR_{492}	—	September 27, 2009	Kitt Peak	Spacewatch	EUP	2.9 km	MPC · JPL
750099	2014 QU_{492}	—	August 3, 2014	Haleakala	Pan-STARRS 1	·	2.0 km	MPC · JPL
750100	2014 QK_{494}	—	August 28, 2014	Haleakala	Pan-STARRS 1	·	2.3 km	MPC · JPL

== 750101–750200 ==
back to top

Designation			Discovery			Properties		Ref
Permanent	Provisional	Named after	Date	Site	Discoverer(s)	Category	Diam.	Ref
750101	2014 QX_{495}	—	August 29, 2014	Mount Lemmon	Mount Lemmon Survey	PHO	800 m	MPC · JPL
750102	2014 QM_{497}	—	December 1, 2003	Kitt Peak	Spacewatch	·	2.0 km	MPC · JPL
750103	2014 QH_{500}	—	August 28, 2014	Haleakala	Pan-STARRS 1	·	1.5 km	MPC · JPL
750104	2014 QL_{503}	—	August 18, 2014	Haleakala	Pan-STARRS 1	·	2.0 km	MPC · JPL
750105	2014 QS_{504}	—	August 20, 2014	Haleakala	Pan-STARRS 1	EOS	1.4 km	MPC · JPL
750106	2014 QE_{506}	—	August 28, 2014	Haleakala	Pan-STARRS 1	·	2.0 km	MPC · JPL
750107	2014 QH_{507}	—	August 23, 2014	Haleakala	Pan-STARRS 1	·	1.6 km	MPC · JPL
750108	2014 QK_{511}	—	August 18, 2014	Haleakala	Pan-STARRS 1	·	1.6 km	MPC · JPL
750109	2014 QG_{515}	—	August 28, 2014	Haleakala	Pan-STARRS 1	·	1.3 km	MPC · JPL
750110	2014 QM_{525}	—	August 31, 2014	Haleakala	Pan-STARRS 1	·	680 m	MPC · JPL
750111	2014 QQ_{525}	—	August 31, 2014	Haleakala	Pan-STARRS 1	·	470 m	MPC · JPL
750112	2014 QF_{547}	—	August 28, 2014	Haleakala	Pan-STARRS 1	·	1.2 km	MPC · JPL
750113	2014 QL_{566}	—	August 28, 2014	Haleakala	Pan-STARRS 1	·	510 m	MPC · JPL
750114	2014 QW_{566}	—	August 31, 2014	Haleakala	Pan-STARRS 1	·	600 m	MPC · JPL
750115	2014 RE_{1}	—	July 10, 2014	Haleakala	Pan-STARRS 1	·	1.6 km	MPC · JPL
750116	2014 RG_{5}	—	February 25, 2011	Mount Lemmon	Mount Lemmon Survey	·	2.1 km	MPC · JPL
750117	2014 RK_{8}	—	February 14, 2010	Kitt Peak	Spacewatch	·	560 m	MPC · JPL
750118	2014 RZ_{8}	—	October 24, 2011	Haleakala	Pan-STARRS 1	·	610 m	MPC · JPL
750119	2014 RD_{12}	—	January 19, 2012	Mount Lemmon	Mount Lemmon Survey	·	550 m	MPC · JPL
750120	2014 RE_{12}	—	August 16, 2015	Sandlot	G. Hug	T_{j} (2.53) · centaur · unusual	20 km	MPC · JPL
750121	2014 RT_{13}	—	September 1, 2014	Mount Lemmon	Mount Lemmon Survey	MAR	770 m	MPC · JPL
750122	2014 RJ_{18}	—	September 11, 2014	Haleakala	Pan-STARRS 1	H	420 m	MPC · JPL
750123	2014 RX_{18}	—	August 25, 2014	Haleakala	Pan-STARRS 1	·	2.1 km	MPC · JPL
750124	2014 RJ_{22}	—	August 30, 2014	Haleakala	Pan-STARRS 1	·	610 m	MPC · JPL
750125	2014 RW_{26}	—	December 2, 2010	Mount Lemmon	Mount Lemmon Survey	BRA	1.7 km	MPC · JPL
750126	2014 RF_{36}	—	August 28, 2014	Haleakala	Pan-STARRS 1	·	2.5 km	MPC · JPL
750127	2014 RJ_{36}	—	August 22, 2014	Haleakala	Pan-STARRS 1	·	3.1 km	MPC · JPL
750128	2014 RW_{39}	—	September 21, 2011	Kitt Peak	Spacewatch	·	550 m	MPC · JPL
750129	2014 RY_{39}	—	July 10, 2014	Haleakala	Pan-STARRS 1	·	550 m	MPC · JPL
750130	2014 RR_{40}	—	September 2, 2014	Catalina	CSS	·	1.8 km	MPC · JPL
750131	2014 RZ_{40}	—	August 28, 2014	Haleakala	Pan-STARRS 1	·	1.9 km	MPC · JPL
750132	2014 RH_{41}	—	August 28, 2014	Haleakala	Pan-STARRS 1	·	1.9 km	MPC · JPL
750133	2014 RF_{43}	—	September 13, 2014	Haleakala	Pan-STARRS 1	·	1.6 km	MPC · JPL
750134	2014 RH_{43}	—	April 22, 2009	Mount Lemmon	Mount Lemmon Survey	·	1.4 km	MPC · JPL
750135	2014 RX_{43}	—	September 30, 2003	Kitt Peak	Spacewatch	·	2.4 km	MPC · JPL
750136	2014 RA_{45}	—	April 16, 2013	Cerro Tololo	DECam	·	880 m	MPC · JPL
750137	2014 RJ_{45}	—	October 27, 2005	Kitt Peak	Spacewatch	AGN	920 m	MPC · JPL
750138	2014 RM_{45}	—	September 14, 2014	Kitt Peak	Spacewatch	·	510 m	MPC · JPL
750139	2014 RJ_{48}	—	September 17, 2009	Kitt Peak	Spacewatch	·	1.5 km	MPC · JPL
750140	2014 RT_{49}	—	July 27, 2014	Haleakala	Pan-STARRS 1	·	520 m	MPC · JPL
750141	2014 RW_{49}	—	September 13, 2007	Mount Lemmon	Mount Lemmon Survey	·	510 m	MPC · JPL
750142	2014 RD_{51}	—	June 30, 2014	Haleakala	Pan-STARRS 1	·	1.2 km	MPC · JPL
750143	2014 RJ_{54}	—	August 30, 2014	Catalina	CSS	·	1.5 km	MPC · JPL
750144	2014 RZ_{54}	—	February 16, 2012	Haleakala	Pan-STARRS 1	·	1.7 km	MPC · JPL
750145	2014 RE_{55}	—	April 29, 2008	Kitt Peak	Spacewatch	·	1.7 km	MPC · JPL
750146	2014 RK_{62}	—	September 17, 2004	Anderson Mesa	LONEOS	·	640 m	MPC · JPL
750147	2014 RP_{67}	—	November 10, 2005	Mount Lemmon	Mount Lemmon Survey	·	1.8 km	MPC · JPL
750148	2014 RA_{68}	—	September 3, 2014	Kitt Peak	Spacewatch	AGN	930 m	MPC · JPL
750149	2014 RT_{69}	—	November 21, 2009	Kitt Peak	Spacewatch	·	3.3 km	MPC · JPL
750150	2014 RC_{71}	—	October 7, 2000	Kitt Peak	Spacewatch	·	1.8 km	MPC · JPL
750151	2014 RQ_{71}	—	September 2, 2014	Haleakala	Pan-STARRS 1	BRA	1.2 km	MPC · JPL
750152	2014 RL_{79}	—	September 2, 2014	Haleakala	Pan-STARRS 1	·	1.8 km	MPC · JPL
750153	2014 SD	—	February 9, 2013	Haleakala	Pan-STARRS 1	H	410 m	MPC · JPL
750154	2014 SB_{5}	—	January 19, 2012	Mount Lemmon	Mount Lemmon Survey	·	590 m	MPC · JPL
750155	2014 SU_{5}	—	July 28, 2014	Haleakala	Pan-STARRS 1	·	2.6 km	MPC · JPL
750156	2014 SJ_{6}	—	March 14, 2012	Mount Lemmon	Mount Lemmon Survey	·	1.9 km	MPC · JPL
750157	2014 SK_{8}	—	August 24, 2014	Tenerife	ESA OGS	·	1.7 km	MPC · JPL
750158	2014 SX_{13}	—	February 5, 2011	Catalina	CSS	TIR	2.4 km	MPC · JPL
750159	2014 SL_{20}	—	January 27, 2007	Mount Lemmon	Mount Lemmon Survey	AGN	980 m	MPC · JPL
750160	2014 SJ_{30}	—	August 17, 2009	Kitt Peak	Spacewatch	·	1.2 km	MPC · JPL
750161	2014 SP_{31}	—	April 14, 2008	Mount Lemmon	Mount Lemmon Survey	·	1.6 km	MPC · JPL
750162	2014 SA_{33}	—	March 5, 2013	Haleakala	Pan-STARRS 1	·	570 m	MPC · JPL
750163	2014 SN_{39}	—	September 17, 2014	Haleakala	Pan-STARRS 1	BRA	1.1 km	MPC · JPL
750164	2014 SH_{40}	—	October 28, 2010	Mount Lemmon	Mount Lemmon Survey	·	1.6 km	MPC · JPL
750165	2014 SW_{40}	—	October 14, 2009	Mount Lemmon	Mount Lemmon Survey	·	2.5 km	MPC · JPL
750166	2014 SR_{48}	—	November 6, 2010	Mount Lemmon	Mount Lemmon Survey	·	1.5 km	MPC · JPL
750167	2014 SO_{49}	—	July 7, 2014	Haleakala	Pan-STARRS 1	·	2.0 km	MPC · JPL
750168	2014 SE_{51}	—	August 20, 2014	Haleakala	Pan-STARRS 1	HOF	2.1 km	MPC · JPL
750169	2014 SE_{53}	—	December 25, 2005	Mount Lemmon	Mount Lemmon Survey	·	1.4 km	MPC · JPL
750170	2014 SB_{55}	—	October 17, 2010	Mount Lemmon	Mount Lemmon Survey	WIT	810 m	MPC · JPL
750171	2014 SZ_{56}	—	July 31, 2014	Haleakala	Pan-STARRS 1	615	990 m	MPC · JPL
750172	2014 SG_{63}	—	January 29, 2012	Kitt Peak	Spacewatch	·	1.5 km	MPC · JPL
750173	2014 SO_{64}	—	October 14, 2009	Mount Lemmon	Mount Lemmon Survey	THM	1.9 km	MPC · JPL
750174	2014 SY_{64}	—	January 23, 2006	Kitt Peak	Spacewatch	·	840 m	MPC · JPL
750175	2014 SC_{65}	—	February 13, 2008	Mount Lemmon	Mount Lemmon Survey	·	1.6 km	MPC · JPL
750176	2014 SH_{65}	—	October 24, 2011	Haleakala	Pan-STARRS 1	·	530 m	MPC · JPL
750177	2014 SL_{65}	—	June 28, 2014	Haleakala	Pan-STARRS 1	·	1.7 km	MPC · JPL
750178	2014 SS_{65}	—	July 25, 2014	Haleakala	Pan-STARRS 1	EOS	1.2 km	MPC · JPL
750179	2014 SH_{66}	—	October 12, 2006	Kitt Peak	Spacewatch	(5)	910 m	MPC · JPL
750180	2014 SL_{66}	—	March 13, 2012	Mount Lemmon	Mount Lemmon Survey	·	1.9 km	MPC · JPL
750181	2014 SX_{68}	—	April 18, 2013	Mount Lemmon	Mount Lemmon Survey	·	1.8 km	MPC · JPL
750182	2014 SQ_{71}	—	August 28, 2014	Haleakala	Pan-STARRS 1	·	1.0 km	MPC · JPL
750183	2014 SY_{71}	—	April 11, 2005	Mount Lemmon	Mount Lemmon Survey	·	1.0 km	MPC · JPL
750184	2014 SH_{72}	—	July 30, 2014	Kitt Peak	Spacewatch	·	600 m	MPC · JPL
750185	2014 SK_{72}	—	November 12, 2010	Mount Lemmon	Mount Lemmon Survey	·	1.6 km	MPC · JPL
750186	2014 SQ_{75}	—	January 27, 2011	Mount Lemmon	Mount Lemmon Survey	·	2.4 km	MPC · JPL
750187	2014 SE_{76}	—	August 28, 2014	Haleakala	Pan-STARRS 1	EOS	1.3 km	MPC · JPL
750188	2014 SO_{78}	—	October 24, 2011	Mount Lemmon	Mount Lemmon Survey	·	510 m	MPC · JPL
750189	2014 SF_{81}	—	September 11, 2014	Haleakala	Pan-STARRS 1	·	760 m	MPC · JPL
750190	2014 SY_{81}	—	August 29, 2014	Kitt Peak	Spacewatch	·	550 m	MPC · JPL
750191	2014 SC_{84}	—	May 3, 2008	Kitt Peak	Spacewatch	·	1.7 km	MPC · JPL
750192	2014 SJ_{87}	—	November 24, 2009	Mount Lemmon	Mount Lemmon Survey	·	2.2 km	MPC · JPL
750193	2014 ST_{94}	—	August 27, 2014	Haleakala	Pan-STARRS 1	·	540 m	MPC · JPL
750194	2014 ST_{102}	—	November 3, 2010	Mount Lemmon	Mount Lemmon Survey	·	1.3 km	MPC · JPL
750195	2014 SK_{105}	—	September 18, 2014	Haleakala	Pan-STARRS 1	EOS	1.4 km	MPC · JPL
750196	2014 SM_{106}	—	September 18, 2014	Haleakala	Pan-STARRS 1	THM	1.7 km	MPC · JPL
750197	2014 SV_{107}	—	August 28, 2005	Kitt Peak	Spacewatch	·	1.4 km	MPC · JPL
750198	2014 SZ_{117}	—	March 17, 2012	Mount Lemmon	Mount Lemmon Survey	·	1.5 km	MPC · JPL
750199	2014 SO_{118}	—	April 29, 2009	Mount Lemmon	Mount Lemmon Survey	·	1.1 km	MPC · JPL
750200	2014 SK_{119}	—	September 18, 2014	Haleakala	Pan-STARRS 1	3:2	3.1 km	MPC · JPL

== 750201–750300 ==
back to top

Designation			Discovery			Properties		Ref
Permanent	Provisional	Named after	Date	Site	Discoverer(s)	Category	Diam.	Ref
750201	2014 SB_{122}	—	August 27, 2014	Haleakala	Pan-STARRS 1	·	1.4 km	MPC · JPL
750202	2014 SL_{124}	—	November 24, 2011	Haleakala	Pan-STARRS 1	·	550 m	MPC · JPL
750203	2014 SY_{125}	—	October 6, 2004	Kitt Peak	Spacewatch	·	530 m	MPC · JPL
750204	2014 SK_{131}	—	April 19, 2006	Kitt Peak	Spacewatch	·	2.6 km	MPC · JPL
750205	2014 SZ_{154}	—	August 28, 2014	Haleakala	Pan-STARRS 1	·	540 m	MPC · JPL
750206	2014 SH_{158}	—	September 22, 2003	Palomar	NEAT	H	490 m	MPC · JPL
750207	2014 SL_{158}	—	January 7, 2010	Mount Lemmon	Mount Lemmon Survey	THM	1.8 km	MPC · JPL
750208	2014 SF_{164}	—	August 25, 2014	Haleakala	Pan-STARRS 1	·	590 m	MPC · JPL
750209	2014 SF_{166}	—	November 18, 2009	Kitt Peak	Spacewatch	VER	2.4 km	MPC · JPL
750210	2014 SU_{166}	—	September 19, 2014	Haleakala	Pan-STARRS 1	·	600 m	MPC · JPL
750211	2014 SO_{171}	—	May 29, 2008	Kitt Peak	Spacewatch	·	1.7 km	MPC · JPL
750212	2014 ST_{171}	—	August 27, 2014	Haleakala	Pan-STARRS 1	·	2.2 km	MPC · JPL
750213	2014 SD_{173}	—	February 19, 2010	Mount Lemmon	Mount Lemmon Survey	·	450 m	MPC · JPL
750214	2014 SG_{173}	—	August 27, 2014	Haleakala	Pan-STARRS 1	·	540 m	MPC · JPL
750215	2014 SN_{173}	—	August 27, 2014	Haleakala	Pan-STARRS 1	·	2.2 km	MPC · JPL
750216	2014 SD_{177}	—	October 24, 2011	Haleakala	Pan-STARRS 1	·	470 m	MPC · JPL
750217	2014 SD_{180}	—	August 24, 2014	Kitt Peak	Spacewatch	·	1.5 km	MPC · JPL
750218	2014 SU_{182}	—	November 20, 2011	Zelenchukskaya Stn	T. V. Krjačko, Satovski, B.	·	710 m	MPC · JPL
750219	2014 SG_{186}	—	August 20, 2014	Haleakala	Pan-STARRS 1	HNS	1.1 km	MPC · JPL
750220	2014 SO_{187}	—	September 27, 2009	Catalina	CSS	·	1.8 km	MPC · JPL
750221	2014 SA_{189}	—	August 30, 2014	Haleakala	Pan-STARRS 1	·	490 m	MPC · JPL
750222	2014 SA_{192}	—	July 27, 2014	Haleakala	Pan-STARRS 1	·	1.4 km	MPC · JPL
750223	2014 SF_{192}	—	May 27, 2012	Mount Lemmon	Mount Lemmon Survey	3:2	4.2 km	MPC · JPL
750224	2014 SE_{195}	—	April 9, 2010	Kitt Peak	Spacewatch	·	640 m	MPC · JPL
750225	2014 SY_{196}	—	October 26, 2011	Haleakala	Pan-STARRS 1	·	510 m	MPC · JPL
750226	2014 ST_{201}	—	August 27, 2014	Haleakala	Pan-STARRS 1	AGN	960 m	MPC · JPL
750227	2014 SY_{207}	—	August 31, 2014	Haleakala	Pan-STARRS 1	·	590 m	MPC · JPL
750228	2014 SY_{209}	—	September 20, 2014	Haleakala	Pan-STARRS 1	·	610 m	MPC · JPL
750229	2014 SJ_{210}	—	September 20, 2014	Haleakala	Pan-STARRS 1	·	670 m	MPC · JPL
750230	2014 SN_{213}	—	September 20, 2014	Haleakala	Pan-STARRS 1	·	1.8 km	MPC · JPL
750231	2014 SB_{214}	—	September 4, 2014	Haleakala	Pan-STARRS 1	·	1.8 km	MPC · JPL
750232	2014 SG_{218}	—	September 20, 2014	Haleakala	Pan-STARRS 1	·	1.5 km	MPC · JPL
750233	2014 SM_{218}	—	September 4, 2014	Haleakala	Pan-STARRS 1	·	1.6 km	MPC · JPL
750234	2014 SA_{220}	—	July 15, 2013	Haleakala	Pan-STARRS 1	·	2.7 km	MPC · JPL
750235	2014 SW_{226}	—	November 4, 2004	Kitt Peak	Spacewatch	·	590 m	MPC · JPL
750236	2014 SF_{228}	—	February 22, 2006	Mount Lemmon	Mount Lemmon Survey	·	3.4 km	MPC · JPL
750237	2014 SH_{228}	—	October 17, 2010	Mount Lemmon	Mount Lemmon Survey	·	830 m	MPC · JPL
750238	2014 ST_{229}	—	September 5, 2008	Kitt Peak	Spacewatch	·	2.1 km	MPC · JPL
750239	2014 SS_{230}	—	September 6, 2008	Mount Lemmon	Mount Lemmon Survey	THM	2.0 km	MPC · JPL
750240	2014 SS_{232}	—	August 27, 2014	Haleakala	Pan-STARRS 1	·	510 m	MPC · JPL
750241	2014 SL_{247}	—	March 14, 2012	Haleakala	Pan-STARRS 1	·	3.8 km	MPC · JPL
750242	2014 SS_{250}	—	February 10, 2011	Mount Lemmon	Mount Lemmon Survey	·	2.3 km	MPC · JPL
750243	2014 SM_{251}	—	March 16, 2012	Mount Lemmon	Mount Lemmon Survey	·	1.9 km	MPC · JPL
750244	2014 SA_{254}	—	September 2, 2014	Haleakala	Pan-STARRS 1	·	1.3 km	MPC · JPL
750245	2014 SU_{254}	—	September 23, 2014	Mount Lemmon	Mount Lemmon Survey	·	1.8 km	MPC · JPL
750246	2014 SQ_{256}	—	September 19, 2014	Haleakala	Pan-STARRS 1	·	2.1 km	MPC · JPL
750247	2014 SF_{259}	—	March 12, 2008	Kitt Peak	Spacewatch	·	1.5 km	MPC · JPL
750248	2014 SK_{261}	—	August 5, 2014	Haleakala	Pan-STARRS 1	H	510 m	MPC · JPL
750249	2014 SU_{266}	—	September 29, 2008	Catalina	CSS	THB	2.7 km	MPC · JPL
750250	2014 SO_{267}	—	August 31, 2005	Kitt Peak	Spacewatch	MRX	880 m	MPC · JPL
750251	2014 SZ_{269}	—	September 20, 2014	Haleakala	Pan-STARRS 1	·	1.2 km	MPC · JPL
750252	2014 SS_{270}	—	September 2, 2014	Kitt Peak	Spacewatch	·	2.5 km	MPC · JPL
750253	2014 SW_{278}	—	January 4, 2012	Mount Lemmon	Mount Lemmon Survey	·	2.2 km	MPC · JPL
750254	2014 SJ_{280}	—	October 15, 2009	Mount Lemmon	Mount Lemmon Survey	·	2.1 km	MPC · JPL
750255	2014 SM_{282}	—	September 2, 2014	Haleakala	Pan-STARRS 1	EOS	1.4 km	MPC · JPL
750256	2014 SQ_{282}	—	September 22, 2014	Kitt Peak	Spacewatch	·	470 m	MPC · JPL
750257	2014 SY_{284}	—	September 2, 2014	Haleakala	Pan-STARRS 1	·	1.4 km	MPC · JPL
750258	2014 SQ_{285}	—	November 18, 2011	Mount Lemmon	Mount Lemmon Survey	·	500 m	MPC · JPL
750259	2014 SF_{286}	—	February 24, 2012	Mount Lemmon	Mount Lemmon Survey	·	2.5 km	MPC · JPL
750260	2014 SB_{288}	—	September 23, 2014	Haleakala	Pan-STARRS 1	·	1.9 km	MPC · JPL
750261	2014 SA_{290}	—	April 22, 2013	Haleakala	Pan-STARRS 1	·	1.5 km	MPC · JPL
750262	2014 SM_{294}	—	December 15, 2010	Mount Lemmon	Mount Lemmon Survey	·	3.4 km	MPC · JPL
750263	2014 SH_{295}	—	September 25, 2014	Mount Lemmon	Mount Lemmon Survey	·	2.0 km	MPC · JPL
750264	2014 SG_{296}	—	November 6, 2009	Catalina	CSS	·	2.4 km	MPC · JPL
750265	2014 SK_{298}	—	September 25, 2014	Kitt Peak	Spacewatch	EOS	1.5 km	MPC · JPL
750266	2014 SB_{299}	—	October 13, 2005	Kitt Peak	Spacewatch	·	1.5 km	MPC · JPL
750267	2014 ST_{301}	—	September 25, 2014	Mount Lemmon	Mount Lemmon Survey	·	1.4 km	MPC · JPL
750268	2014 SW_{305}	—	September 22, 2008	Mount Lemmon	Mount Lemmon Survey	·	2.9 km	MPC · JPL
750269	2014 SV_{308}	—	October 13, 2007	Kitt Peak	Spacewatch	·	620 m	MPC · JPL
750270	2014 SC_{311}	—	October 11, 2010	Mount Lemmon	Mount Lemmon Survey	(5)	920 m	MPC · JPL
750271	2014 SG_{313}	—	August 29, 2005	Palomar	NEAT	·	1.5 km	MPC · JPL
750272	2014 SF_{314}	—	July 30, 2005	Palomar	NEAT	·	1.3 km	MPC · JPL
750273	2014 SR_{318}	—	September 16, 2009	Kitt Peak	Spacewatch	KOR	1.0 km	MPC · JPL
750274	2014 SJ_{319}	—	September 29, 2014	Haleakala	Pan-STARRS 1	EOS	1.2 km	MPC · JPL
750275	2014 SC_{321}	—	August 25, 2014	Haleakala	Pan-STARRS 1	·	770 m	MPC · JPL
750276	2014 SD_{326}	—	September 26, 2014	Kitt Peak	Spacewatch	·	2.4 km	MPC · JPL
750277	2014 SJ_{328}	—	September 2, 2014	Haleakala	Pan-STARRS 1	·	550 m	MPC · JPL
750278	2014 SE_{329}	—	September 19, 2014	Haleakala	Pan-STARRS 1	·	2.0 km	MPC · JPL
750279	2014 SZ_{332}	—	September 22, 2003	Kitt Peak	Spacewatch	·	850 m	MPC · JPL
750280	2014 SQ_{335}	—	July 30, 2014	Haleakala	Pan-STARRS 1	·	2.2 km	MPC · JPL
750281	2014 SJ_{342}	—	September 19, 2014	Haleakala	Pan-STARRS 1	·	550 m	MPC · JPL
750282	2014 SX_{342}	—	February 26, 2012	Mount Lemmon	Mount Lemmon Survey	EOS	1.5 km	MPC · JPL
750283	2014 SE_{343}	—	March 11, 2013	Mount Lemmon	Mount Lemmon Survey	·	1.2 km	MPC · JPL
750284	2014 SH_{347}	—	September 20, 2009	Kitt Peak	Spacewatch	·	1.4 km	MPC · JPL
750285	2014 SL_{347}	—	September 12, 2007	Mount Lemmon	Mount Lemmon Survey	(2076)	540 m	MPC · JPL
750286	2014 SD_{348}	—	September 2, 2014	Haleakala	Pan-STARRS 1	·	510 m	MPC · JPL
750287	2014 SG_{348}	—	September 30, 2014	Kitt Peak	Spacewatch	·	490 m	MPC · JPL
750288	2014 ST_{353}	—	September 29, 2014	Haleakala	Pan-STARRS 1	·	1.3 km	MPC · JPL
750289	2014 SJ_{359}	—	September 19, 2014	Haleakala	Pan-STARRS 1	TEL	1.1 km	MPC · JPL
750290	2014 SQ_{359}	—	September 6, 2014	Mount Lemmon	Mount Lemmon Survey	·	1.8 km	MPC · JPL
750291	2014 SX_{359}	—	September 19, 2014	Haleakala	Pan-STARRS 1	PAD	1.2 km	MPC · JPL
750292	2014 SX_{360}	—	August 9, 2013	Haleakala	Pan-STARRS 1	·	2.3 km	MPC · JPL
750293	2014 SP_{361}	—	September 22, 2014	Haleakala	Pan-STARRS 1	·	2.2 km	MPC · JPL
750294	2014 SX_{362}	—	September 26, 2014	Kitt Peak	Spacewatch	KOR	1.0 km	MPC · JPL
750295	2014 SW_{364}	—	October 10, 2007	Mount Lemmon	Mount Lemmon Survey	·	670 m	MPC · JPL
750296	2014 SO_{365}	—	September 19, 2014	Haleakala	Pan-STARRS 1	PHO	730 m	MPC · JPL
750297	2014 SC_{375}	—	September 25, 2014	Mount Lemmon	Mount Lemmon Survey	·	1.2 km	MPC · JPL
750298	2014 SJ_{383}	—	September 19, 2014	Haleakala	Pan-STARRS 1	·	530 m	MPC · JPL
750299	2014 SX_{387}	—	September 24, 2014	Kitt Peak	Spacewatch	·	520 m	MPC · JPL
750300	2014 SR_{390}	—	September 19, 2014	Haleakala	Pan-STARRS 1	·	2.4 km	MPC · JPL

== 750301–750400 ==
back to top

Designation			Discovery			Properties		Ref
Permanent	Provisional	Named after	Date	Site	Discoverer(s)	Category	Diam.	Ref
750301	2014 SX_{399}	—	September 20, 2014	Haleakala	Pan-STARRS 1	·	540 m	MPC · JPL
750302	2014 SX_{409}	—	April 12, 2013	Siding Spring	SSS	JUN	960 m	MPC · JPL
750303	2014 TV_{1}	—	September 23, 2014	Kitt Peak	Spacewatch	·	1.1 km	MPC · JPL
750304	2014 TD_{3}	—	September 19, 2003	Kitt Peak	Spacewatch	THM	1.9 km	MPC · JPL
750305	2014 TV_{5}	—	September 2, 2014	Haleakala	Pan-STARRS 1	·	870 m	MPC · JPL
750306	2014 TN_{6}	—	October 1, 2014	Kitt Peak	Spacewatch	·	1.3 km	MPC · JPL
750307	2014 TQ_{6}	—	September 2, 2014	Haleakala	Pan-STARRS 1	·	1.7 km	MPC · JPL
750308	2014 TX_{6}	—	September 16, 2004	Anderson Mesa	LONEOS	·	530 m	MPC · JPL
750309	2014 TG_{7}	—	September 22, 2009	Mount Lemmon	Mount Lemmon Survey	·	1.7 km	MPC · JPL
750310	2014 TP_{8}	—	July 14, 2009	Kitt Peak	Spacewatch	MRX	980 m	MPC · JPL
750311	2014 TL_{9}	—	September 2, 2014	Haleakala	Pan-STARRS 1	·	1.3 km	MPC · JPL
750312	2014 TM_{9}	—	April 16, 2013	Cerro Tololo	DECam	·	500 m	MPC · JPL
750313	2014 TS_{10}	—	October 26, 2009	Mount Lemmon	Mount Lemmon Survey	·	1.4 km	MPC · JPL
750314	2014 TP_{12}	—	October 1, 2014	Haleakala	Pan-STARRS 1	·	1.7 km	MPC · JPL
750315	2014 TM_{13}	—	September 23, 2008	Kitt Peak	Spacewatch	·	1.9 km	MPC · JPL
750316	2014 TG_{14}	—	October 18, 2009	Mount Lemmon	Mount Lemmon Survey	·	1.9 km	MPC · JPL
750317	2014 TK_{14}	—	September 25, 2014	Kitt Peak	Spacewatch	·	1.7 km	MPC · JPL
750318	2014 TU_{14}	—	October 1, 2014	Haleakala	Pan-STARRS 1	·	2.3 km	MPC · JPL
750319	2014 TQ_{17}	—	February 11, 2013	Catalina	CSS	H	450 m	MPC · JPL
750320	2014 TR_{17}	—	October 2, 2014	Haleakala	Pan-STARRS 1	H	410 m	MPC · JPL
750321	2014 TW_{18}	—	October 1, 2014	Kitt Peak	Spacewatch	·	1.5 km	MPC · JPL
750322	2014 TD_{19}	—	November 3, 2004	Kitt Peak	Spacewatch	·	1.3 km	MPC · JPL
750323	2014 TH_{19}	—	October 19, 2003	Kitt Peak	Spacewatch	THM	1.8 km	MPC · JPL
750324	2014 TX_{19}	—	April 9, 2010	Kitt Peak	Spacewatch	·	520 m	MPC · JPL
750325	2014 TP_{21}	—	August 16, 2007	Pla D'Arguines	R. Ferrando, Ferrando, M.	·	470 m	MPC · JPL
750326	2014 TJ_{22}	—	October 1, 2014	Kitt Peak	Spacewatch	·	1.5 km	MPC · JPL
750327	2014 TS_{27}	—	September 10, 2007	Mount Lemmon	Mount Lemmon Survey	·	550 m	MPC · JPL
750328	2014 TU_{27}	—	October 12, 2004	Kitt Peak	Spacewatch	·	520 m	MPC · JPL
750329	2014 TN_{30}	—	September 17, 2009	Kitt Peak	Spacewatch	·	1.6 km	MPC · JPL
750330	2014 TL_{33}	—	October 2, 2014	Haleakala	Pan-STARRS 1	H	460 m	MPC · JPL
750331	2014 TA_{41}	—	September 14, 2014	Mount Lemmon	Mount Lemmon Survey	·	3.9 km	MPC · JPL
750332	2014 TS_{42}	—	October 22, 2005	Kitt Peak	Spacewatch	·	1.8 km	MPC · JPL
750333	2014 TP_{43}	—	November 8, 2009	Kitt Peak	Spacewatch	·	1.1 km	MPC · JPL
750334	2014 TL_{46}	—	September 20, 2008	Kitt Peak	Spacewatch	·	2.3 km	MPC · JPL
750335	2014 TU_{47}	—	October 13, 2014	Mount Lemmon	Mount Lemmon Survey	EOS	1.7 km	MPC · JPL
750336	2014 TS_{52}	—	October 14, 2014	Mount Lemmon	Mount Lemmon Survey	EOS	1.4 km	MPC · JPL
750337	2014 TW_{54}	—	September 5, 2008	Kitt Peak	Spacewatch	·	2.3 km	MPC · JPL
750338	2014 TE_{60}	—	September 24, 2014	Kitt Peak	Spacewatch	·	490 m	MPC · JPL
750339	2014 TW_{63}	—	September 9, 2007	Kitt Peak	Spacewatch	·	530 m	MPC · JPL
750340	2014 TY_{67}	—	October 1, 2014	Haleakala	Pan-STARRS 1	·	1.6 km	MPC · JPL
750341	2014 TO_{69}	—	August 31, 2014	Haleakala	Pan-STARRS 1	·	590 m	MPC · JPL
750342	2014 TB_{70}	—	November 18, 2009	Mount Lemmon	Mount Lemmon Survey	·	1.8 km	MPC · JPL
750343	2014 TU_{70}	—	November 17, 1995	Kitt Peak	Spacewatch	NYS	1.1 km	MPC · JPL
750344	2014 TP_{71}	—	September 28, 2003	Kitt Peak	Spacewatch	·	1.8 km	MPC · JPL
750345	2014 TT_{71}	—	October 14, 2014	Kitt Peak	Spacewatch	·	1.4 km	MPC · JPL
750346	2014 TD_{72}	—	November 11, 2010	Kitt Peak	Spacewatch	·	670 m	MPC · JPL
750347	2014 TE_{74}	—	October 15, 2014	Kitt Peak	Spacewatch	·	790 m	MPC · JPL
750348	2014 TT_{76}	—	September 29, 2014	Haleakala	Pan-STARRS 1	·	550 m	MPC · JPL
750349	2014 TE_{78}	—	April 16, 2012	Haleakala	Pan-STARRS 1	NAE	2.2 km	MPC · JPL
750350	2014 TJ_{80}	—	September 17, 2009	Kitt Peak	Spacewatch	·	1.6 km	MPC · JPL
750351	2014 TQ_{80}	—	September 4, 2014	Haleakala	Pan-STARRS 1	·	2.2 km	MPC · JPL
750352	2014 TJ_{81}	—	September 24, 2014	Kitt Peak	Spacewatch	·	2.5 km	MPC · JPL
750353	2014 TG_{86}	—	April 3, 2008	Kitt Peak	Spacewatch	H	410 m	MPC · JPL
750354	2014 TB_{89}	—	September 7, 2008	Mount Lemmon	Mount Lemmon Survey	·	2.0 km	MPC · JPL
750355	2014 TJ_{89}	—	October 1, 2014	Haleakala	Pan-STARRS 1	EOS	1.5 km	MPC · JPL
750356	2014 TQ_{89}	—	October 3, 2014	Mount Lemmon	Mount Lemmon Survey	·	1.6 km	MPC · JPL
750357	2014 TZ_{89}	—	October 2, 2014	Haleakala	Pan-STARRS 1	·	1.5 km	MPC · JPL
750358	2014 TF_{90}	—	October 30, 2009	Mount Lemmon	Mount Lemmon Survey	·	1.8 km	MPC · JPL
750359	2014 TK_{90}	—	October 14, 2014	Mount Lemmon	Mount Lemmon Survey	·	1.4 km	MPC · JPL
750360	2014 TX_{90}	—	October 5, 2014	Mount Lemmon	Mount Lemmon Survey	·	2.1 km	MPC · JPL
750361	2014 TD_{92}	—	October 2, 2014	Haleakala	Pan-STARRS 1	·	1.4 km	MPC · JPL
750362	2014 TX_{92}	—	September 19, 1998	Apache Point	SDSS	·	1.7 km	MPC · JPL
750363	2014 TY_{92}	—	January 3, 2011	Mount Lemmon	Mount Lemmon Survey	·	1.6 km	MPC · JPL
750364	2014 TF_{93}	—	August 4, 2013	Haleakala	Pan-STARRS 1	·	2.1 km	MPC · JPL
750365	2014 TU_{93}	—	October 27, 2009	Kitt Peak	Spacewatch	EOS	1.4 km	MPC · JPL
750366	2014 TC_{95}	—	October 14, 2014	Kitt Peak	Spacewatch	EOS	1.5 km	MPC · JPL
750367	2014 TQ_{95}	—	October 3, 2014	Mount Lemmon	Mount Lemmon Survey	·	2.2 km	MPC · JPL
750368	2014 TH_{96}	—	October 2, 2014	Haleakala	Pan-STARRS 1	·	2.7 km	MPC · JPL
750369	2014 TB_{98}	—	October 1, 2014	Haleakala	Pan-STARRS 1	·	2.2 km	MPC · JPL
750370	2014 TP_{110}	—	October 5, 2014	Haleakala	Pan-STARRS 1	·	1.0 km	MPC · JPL
750371	2014 TQ_{112}	—	October 4, 2014	Mount Lemmon	Mount Lemmon Survey	·	1.8 km	MPC · JPL
750372	2014 TB_{117}	—	October 1, 2014	Catalina	CSS	·	690 m	MPC · JPL
750373	2014 TC_{118}	—	October 7, 2014	Haleakala	Pan-STARRS 1	·	670 m	MPC · JPL
750374	2014 TD_{123}	—	October 1, 2014	Mount Lemmon	Mount Lemmon Survey	·	1.3 km	MPC · JPL
750375	2014 UE_{1}	—	September 4, 2014	Haleakala	Pan-STARRS 1	EOS	1.4 km	MPC · JPL
750376	2014 UG_{2}	—	August 27, 2014	Haleakala	Pan-STARRS 1	·	1.5 km	MPC · JPL
750377	2014 UY_{4}	—	October 9, 2007	Mount Lemmon	Mount Lemmon Survey	·	600 m	MPC · JPL
750378	2014 UZ_{5}	—	July 4, 2000	Kitt Peak	Spacewatch	·	550 m	MPC · JPL
750379	2014 UG_{12}	—	October 21, 2008	Mount Lemmon	Mount Lemmon Survey	·	3.1 km	MPC · JPL
750380	2014 UQ_{17}	—	November 8, 2009	Mount Lemmon	Mount Lemmon Survey	·	1.9 km	MPC · JPL
750381	2014 UK_{21}	—	October 18, 2014	Mount Lemmon	Mount Lemmon Survey	·	1.9 km	MPC · JPL
750382	2014 UL_{23}	—	October 19, 2014	Kitt Peak	Spacewatch	·	660 m	MPC · JPL
750383	2014 UR_{26}	—	November 18, 2009	Mount Lemmon	Mount Lemmon Survey	·	1.2 km	MPC · JPL
750384	2014 UX_{26}	—	March 23, 2012	Mount Lemmon	Mount Lemmon Survey	·	1.6 km	MPC · JPL
750385	2014 UK_{30}	—	September 30, 2014	Mount Lemmon	Mount Lemmon Survey	H	390 m	MPC · JPL
750386	2014 UB_{33}	—	March 6, 2013	Nogales	M. Schwartz, P. R. Holvorcem	H	530 m	MPC · JPL
750387	2014 UB_{35}	—	September 23, 2014	Haleakala	Pan-STARRS 1	H	450 m	MPC · JPL
750388	2014 UJ_{39}	—	April 6, 2013	Mount Lemmon	Mount Lemmon Survey	·	1 km	MPC · JPL
750389	2014 UD_{42}	—	October 3, 2014	Mount Lemmon	Mount Lemmon Survey	·	1.5 km	MPC · JPL
750390	2014 UF_{42}	—	November 17, 2009	Kitt Peak	Spacewatch	·	1.4 km	MPC · JPL
750391	2014 UE_{44}	—	October 13, 2014	Kitt Peak	Spacewatch	·	1.7 km	MPC · JPL
750392	2014 UH_{46}	—	November 15, 2003	Kitt Peak	Spacewatch	·	2.4 km	MPC · JPL
750393	2014 UZ_{46}	—	October 21, 2014	Kitt Peak	Spacewatch	·	1.8 km	MPC · JPL
750394	2014 UF_{47}	—	November 14, 2007	Kitt Peak	Spacewatch	NYS	710 m	MPC · JPL
750395	2014 UL_{48}	—	October 4, 2004	Kitt Peak	Spacewatch	·	530 m	MPC · JPL
750396	2014 UA_{49}	—	December 14, 2004	Kitt Peak	Spacewatch	·	1.8 km	MPC · JPL
750397	2014 UP_{49}	—	October 21, 2014	Kitt Peak	Spacewatch	·	560 m	MPC · JPL
750398	2014 UZ_{52}	—	October 8, 2014	Haleakala	Pan-STARRS 1	·	2.0 km	MPC · JPL
750399	2014 UR_{53}	—	December 1, 2003	Kitt Peak	Spacewatch	·	940 m	MPC · JPL
750400	2014 UE_{54}	—	October 22, 2014	Mount Lemmon	Mount Lemmon Survey	THM	1.9 km	MPC · JPL

== 750401–750500 ==
back to top

Designation			Discovery			Properties		Ref
Permanent	Provisional	Named after	Date	Site	Discoverer(s)	Category	Diam.	Ref
750401	2014 UE_{56}	—	February 8, 2011	Mount Lemmon	Mount Lemmon Survey	·	1.3 km	MPC · JPL
750402	2014 UC_{57}	—	December 27, 2011	Mount Lemmon	Mount Lemmon Survey	PHO	900 m	MPC · JPL
750403	2014 UN_{57}	—	October 23, 2014	Mount Lemmon	Mount Lemmon Survey	H	440 m	MPC · JPL
750404	2014 UB_{59}	—	October 18, 2014	Mount Lemmon	Mount Lemmon Survey	·	500 m	MPC · JPL
750405	2014 UH_{64}	—	May 11, 2013	Mount Lemmon	Mount Lemmon Survey	·	1.6 km	MPC · JPL
750406	2014 UN_{64}	—	October 20, 2014	Mount Lemmon	Mount Lemmon Survey	BRA	1.3 km	MPC · JPL
750407	2014 UT_{64}	—	November 24, 2011	Mount Lemmon	Mount Lemmon Survey	·	620 m	MPC · JPL
750408	2014 UV_{64}	—	September 27, 2003	Kitt Peak	Spacewatch	·	2.1 km	MPC · JPL
750409	2014 UH_{66}	—	September 29, 2009	Mount Lemmon	Mount Lemmon Survey	·	1.8 km	MPC · JPL
750410	2014 UV_{66}	—	October 20, 2014	Kitt Peak	Spacewatch	L5	9.3 km	MPC · JPL
750411	2014 UC_{68}	—	October 5, 2004	Anderson Mesa	LONEOS	·	590 m	MPC · JPL
750412	2014 UL_{70}	—	September 25, 2014	Kitt Peak	Spacewatch	·	1.3 km	MPC · JPL
750413	2014 UU_{73}	—	September 21, 2009	Mount Lemmon	Mount Lemmon Survey	·	1.2 km	MPC · JPL
750414	2014 UM_{84}	—	September 22, 2003	Kitt Peak	Spacewatch	·	1.5 km	MPC · JPL
750415	2014 UO_{85}	—	March 13, 2012	Mount Lemmon	Mount Lemmon Survey	·	730 m	MPC · JPL
750416	2014 UR_{88}	—	September 24, 2014	Mount Lemmon	Mount Lemmon Survey	·	1.5 km	MPC · JPL
750417	2014 UE_{89}	—	October 14, 2014	Mount Lemmon	Mount Lemmon Survey	·	500 m	MPC · JPL
750418	2014 UM_{92}	—	October 24, 2009	Kitt Peak	Spacewatch	·	1.6 km	MPC · JPL
750419	2014 UQ_{92}	—	September 28, 2003	Kitt Peak	Spacewatch	·	2.5 km	MPC · JPL
750420	2014 UT_{98}	—	August 7, 2008	Kitt Peak	Spacewatch	·	1.9 km	MPC · JPL
750421	2014 UX_{98}	—	August 31, 2014	Haleakala	Pan-STARRS 1	V	480 m	MPC · JPL
750422	2014 UF_{100}	—	September 25, 2014	Catalina	CSS	DOR	2.1 km	MPC · JPL
750423	2014 UK_{100}	—	October 24, 2014	Kitt Peak	Spacewatch	·	1.3 km	MPC · JPL
750424	2014 UP_{100}	—	September 15, 2007	Lulin	LUSS	·	540 m	MPC · JPL
750425	2014 UW_{100}	—	October 8, 2007	Mount Lemmon	Mount Lemmon Survey	·	540 m	MPC · JPL
750426	2014 UB_{102}	—	October 24, 2014	Kitt Peak	Spacewatch	·	1.2 km	MPC · JPL
750427	2014 UP_{103}	—	September 18, 2003	Kitt Peak	Spacewatch	·	1.8 km	MPC · JPL
750428	2014 UO_{105}	—	September 20, 2003	Kitt Peak	Spacewatch	·	1.7 km	MPC · JPL
750429	2014 UM_{111}	—	September 3, 2014	Kitt Peak	Spacewatch	EOS	1.6 km	MPC · JPL
750430	2014 UH_{113}	—	September 29, 2003	Kitt Peak	Spacewatch	MAS	520 m	MPC · JPL
750431	2014 UX_{113}	—	August 31, 2014	Haleakala	Pan-STARRS 1	·	580 m	MPC · JPL
750432	2014 UB_{115}	—	July 5, 2010	Kitt Peak	Spacewatch	PHO	1.1 km	MPC · JPL
750433	2014 UR_{115}	—	September 16, 2004	Socorro	LINEAR	H	490 m	MPC · JPL
750434	2014 UT_{115}	—	October 23, 2001	Palomar	NEAT	H	560 m	MPC · JPL
750435	2014 UD_{119}	—	September 22, 2003	Kitt Peak	Spacewatch	·	1.6 km	MPC · JPL
750436	2014 UZ_{120}	—	March 16, 2005	Mount Lemmon	Mount Lemmon Survey	THM	1.9 km	MPC · JPL
750437	2014 UV_{122}	—	December 29, 2011	Mount Lemmon	Mount Lemmon Survey	·	610 m	MPC · JPL
750438	2014 UF_{134}	—	October 24, 2014	Kitt Peak	Spacewatch	·	1.8 km	MPC · JPL
750439	2014 UV_{135}	—	October 24, 2014	Kitt Peak	Spacewatch	·	1.4 km	MPC · JPL
750440	2014 UX_{138}	—	October 25, 2014	Kitt Peak	Spacewatch	·	600 m	MPC · JPL
750441	2014 UP_{140}	—	October 25, 2014	Kitt Peak	Spacewatch	·	2.0 km	MPC · JPL
750442	2014 UQ_{140}	—	June 15, 2007	Kitt Peak	Spacewatch	·	590 m	MPC · JPL
750443	2014 UF_{145}	—	January 30, 2011	Haleakala	Pan-STARRS 1	·	1.6 km	MPC · JPL
750444	2014 UZ_{147}	—	October 18, 2014	Mount Lemmon	Mount Lemmon Survey	·	1.1 km	MPC · JPL
750445	2014 UK_{151}	—	April 1, 2012	Mount Lemmon	Mount Lemmon Survey	·	1.5 km	MPC · JPL
750446	2014 UV_{152}	—	October 2, 2014	Haleakala	Pan-STARRS 1	·	550 m	MPC · JPL
750447	2014 UW_{152}	—	October 2, 2014	Haleakala	Pan-STARRS 1	·	1.2 km	MPC · JPL
750448	2014 UG_{153}	—	March 29, 2008	Kitt Peak	Spacewatch	MRX	1.1 km	MPC · JPL
750449	2014 UO_{162}	—	September 19, 2003	Kitt Peak	Spacewatch	·	1.7 km	MPC · JPL
750450	2014 UV_{162}	—	September 30, 2003	Kitt Peak	Spacewatch	·	2.2 km	MPC · JPL
750451	2014 UT_{165}	—	October 26, 2014	Mount Lemmon	Mount Lemmon Survey	·	1.4 km	MPC · JPL
750452	2014 UN_{167}	—	October 7, 2007	Kitt Peak	Spacewatch	·	500 m	MPC · JPL
750453	2014 UQ_{169}	—	July 15, 2013	Haleakala	Pan-STARRS 1	·	1.8 km	MPC · JPL
750454	2014 UG_{170}	—	October 3, 2014	Mount Lemmon	Mount Lemmon Survey	·	530 m	MPC · JPL
750455	2014 UX_{179}	—	September 20, 2014	Haleakala	Pan-STARRS 1	·	1.6 km	MPC · JPL
750456	2014 UV_{180}	—	October 1, 2014	Haleakala	Pan-STARRS 1	·	1.8 km	MPC · JPL
750457	2014 UH_{182}	—	November 12, 2010	Mount Lemmon	Mount Lemmon Survey	·	830 m	MPC · JPL
750458	2014 UR_{182}	—	March 12, 2011	Mount Lemmon	Mount Lemmon Survey	EOS	1.5 km	MPC · JPL
750459	2014 UE_{183}	—	October 18, 2014	Kitt Peak	Spacewatch	EOS	1.3 km	MPC · JPL
750460	2014 UR_{184}	—	September 2, 2014	Haleakala	Pan-STARRS 1	·	1.9 km	MPC · JPL
750461	2014 UU_{186}	—	February 3, 2006	Mauna Kea	P. A. Wiegert, R. Rasmussen	·	1.6 km	MPC · JPL
750462	2014 UC_{190}	—	August 12, 2013	Haleakala	Pan-STARRS 1	·	2.0 km	MPC · JPL
750463	2014 UW_{191}	—	October 27, 2014	WISE	WISE	·	2.4 km	MPC · JPL
750464	2014 UP_{192}	—	October 28, 2014	Haleakala	Pan-STARRS 1	·	560 m	MPC · JPL
750465	2014 UD_{201}	—	October 29, 2010	Kitt Peak	Spacewatch	·	1.5 km	MPC · JPL
750466	2014 UD_{202}	—	October 25, 2009	Kitt Peak	Spacewatch	·	1.8 km	MPC · JPL
750467	2014 UH_{202}	—	August 30, 2014	Haleakala	Pan-STARRS 1	·	570 m	MPC · JPL
750468	2014 UP_{203}	—	October 21, 2014	Kitt Peak	Spacewatch	L5	6.9 km	MPC · JPL
750469	2014 UR_{205}	—	September 14, 2014	Kitt Peak	Spacewatch	·	2.4 km	MPC · JPL
750470	2014 UY_{212}	—	April 1, 2011	Mount Lemmon	Mount Lemmon Survey	·	2.6 km	MPC · JPL
750471	2014 UD_{213}	—	October 17, 2010	Mount Lemmon	Mount Lemmon Survey	(5)	1.1 km	MPC · JPL
750472	2014 UF_{216}	—	September 18, 2014	Haleakala	Pan-STARRS 1	TIR	2.8 km	MPC · JPL
750473	2014 UE_{220}	—	July 1, 2014	Mount Lemmon	Mount Lemmon Survey	TIN	820 m	MPC · JPL
750474	2014 UH_{220}	—	July 5, 2014	Haleakala	Pan-STARRS 1	TIR	2.6 km	MPC · JPL
750475	2014 UY_{221}	—	June 30, 2014	Haleakala	Pan-STARRS 1	·	1.1 km	MPC · JPL
750476	2014 UG_{222}	—	October 12, 2014	Mount Lemmon	Mount Lemmon Survey	MAR	800 m	MPC · JPL
750477	2014 UP_{225}	—	October 28, 2014	Haleakala	Pan-STARRS 1	H	480 m	MPC · JPL
750478	2014 UE_{227}	—	October 28, 2014	Haleakala	Pan-STARRS 1	·	1.7 km	MPC · JPL
750479	2014 UZ_{231}	—	October 16, 2014	Mount Lemmon	Mount Lemmon Survey	·	1.8 km	MPC · JPL
750480	2014 UL_{232}	—	October 28, 2014	Haleakala	Pan-STARRS 1	·	1.6 km	MPC · JPL
750481	2014 UJ_{236}	—	October 25, 2014	Haleakala	Pan-STARRS 1	·	1.5 km	MPC · JPL
750482	2014 UN_{236}	—	June 4, 2013	Mount Lemmon	Mount Lemmon Survey	·	2.1 km	MPC · JPL
750483	2014 UB_{238}	—	October 28, 2014	Haleakala	Pan-STARRS 1	·	1.6 km	MPC · JPL
750484	2014 UQ_{238}	—	October 28, 2014	Haleakala	Pan-STARRS 1	·	1.6 km	MPC · JPL
750485	2014 UO_{242}	—	October 28, 2014	Haleakala	Pan-STARRS 1	·	500 m	MPC · JPL
750486	2014 UD_{244}	—	October 26, 2014	Haleakala	Pan-STARRS 1	EOS	1.3 km	MPC · JPL
750487	2014 UE_{245}	—	October 18, 2014	Kitt Peak	Spacewatch	L5	7.9 km	MPC · JPL
750488	2014 UM_{250}	—	January 31, 2017	Mount Lemmon	Mount Lemmon Survey	L5	9.5 km	MPC · JPL
750489	2014 UY_{257}	—	October 28, 2014	Haleakala	Pan-STARRS 1	·	620 m	MPC · JPL
750490	2014 UF_{258}	—	October 22, 2014	Kitt Peak	Spacewatch	HOF	1.8 km	MPC · JPL
750491	2014 UW_{261}	—	October 17, 2014	Mount Lemmon	Mount Lemmon Survey	·	890 m	MPC · JPL
750492	2014 UE_{262}	—	October 18, 2014	Mount Lemmon	Mount Lemmon Survey	KOR	1 km	MPC · JPL
750493	2014 UA_{263}	—	October 18, 2014	Mount Lemmon	Mount Lemmon Survey	L5	8.6 km	MPC · JPL
750494	2014 UB_{264}	—	October 28, 2014	Haleakala	Pan-STARRS 1	·	2.0 km	MPC · JPL
750495	2014 VO_{1}	—	April 1, 2013	Haleakala	Pan-STARRS 1	H	450 m	MPC · JPL
750496	2014 VP_{2}	—	October 25, 2014	Mount Lemmon	Mount Lemmon Survey	TIR	2.5 km	MPC · JPL
750497	2014 VO_{4}	—	November 25, 2009	Kitt Peak	Spacewatch	·	1.7 km	MPC · JPL
750498	2014 VW_{4}	—	December 3, 2007	Kitt Peak	Spacewatch	·	810 m	MPC · JPL
750499	2014 VF_{6}	—	October 1, 2014	Haleakala	Pan-STARRS 1	T_{j} (2.96) · 3:2	4.3 km	MPC · JPL
750500	2014 VL_{6}	—	November 11, 2014	Haleakala	Pan-STARRS 1	APO · PHA	240 m	MPC · JPL

== 750501–750600 ==
back to top

Designation			Discovery			Properties		Ref
Permanent	Provisional	Named after	Date	Site	Discoverer(s)	Category	Diam.	Ref
750501	2014 VS_{6}	—	November 9, 2014	Haleakala	Pan-STARRS 1	·	730 m	MPC · JPL
750502	2014 VU_{8}	—	November 12, 2014	Haleakala	Pan-STARRS 1	·	660 m	MPC · JPL
750503	2014 VG_{11}	—	October 20, 2007	Mount Lemmon	Mount Lemmon Survey	·	580 m	MPC · JPL
750504	2014 VR_{12}	—	October 21, 2003	Palomar	NEAT	·	2.8 km	MPC · JPL
750505	2014 VL_{14}	—	September 12, 2007	Siding Spring	SSS	T_{j} (2.94)	4.2 km	MPC · JPL
750506	2014 VG_{16}	—	November 14, 2014	Kitt Peak	Spacewatch	·	2.3 km	MPC · JPL
750507	2014 VB_{17}	—	September 18, 2003	Kitt Peak	Spacewatch	·	880 m	MPC · JPL
750508	2014 VK_{17}	—	October 24, 2014	Kitt Peak	Spacewatch	TIR	2.3 km	MPC · JPL
750509	2014 VD_{20}	—	October 25, 2014	Kitt Peak	Spacewatch	EOS	1.4 km	MPC · JPL
750510	2014 VB_{21}	—	October 15, 2009	Kitt Peak	Spacewatch	·	1.8 km	MPC · JPL
750511	2014 VB_{23}	—	October 16, 2014	Mount Lemmon	Mount Lemmon Survey	·	1.3 km	MPC · JPL
750512	2014 VK_{26}	—	October 20, 2003	Palomar	NEAT	·	2.1 km	MPC · JPL
750513	2014 VU_{27}	—	November 9, 2009	Mount Lemmon	Mount Lemmon Survey	·	1.3 km	MPC · JPL
750514	2014 VW_{31}	—	October 1, 2003	Kitt Peak	Spacewatch	·	1.9 km	MPC · JPL
750515	2014 VZ_{32}	—	April 22, 2012	Kitt Peak	Spacewatch	·	1.6 km	MPC · JPL
750516	2014 VX_{35}	—	October 13, 2014	Kitt Peak	Spacewatch	·	940 m	MPC · JPL
750517	2014 VD_{42}	—	November 15, 2014	Mount Lemmon	Mount Lemmon Survey	L5	7.4 km	MPC · JPL
750518	2014 WG_{2}	—	April 2, 2011	Mount Lemmon	Mount Lemmon Survey	EOS	1.4 km	MPC · JPL
750519	2014 WT_{4}	—	November 17, 2014	Catalina	CSS	PHO	1.0 km	MPC · JPL
750520	2014 WD_{5}	—	April 15, 2012	Haleakala	Pan-STARRS 1	·	2.4 km	MPC · JPL
750521	2014 WZ_{5}	—	September 15, 2014	Mount Lemmon	Mount Lemmon Survey	H	460 m	MPC · JPL
750522	2014 WE_{10}	—	October 15, 2014	Kitt Peak	Spacewatch	·	2.9 km	MPC · JPL
750523	2014 WS_{16}	—	November 16, 2014	Mount Lemmon	Mount Lemmon Survey	·	520 m	MPC · JPL
750524	2014 WA_{17}	—	October 31, 2014	Kitt Peak	Spacewatch	·	1.3 km	MPC · JPL
750525	2014 WN_{19}	—	October 13, 2014	Mount Lemmon	Mount Lemmon Survey	·	2.2 km	MPC · JPL
750526	2014 WO_{21}	—	November 17, 2014	Mount Lemmon	Mount Lemmon Survey	BRG	1.1 km	MPC · JPL
750527	2014 WF_{22}	—	October 22, 2003	Apache Point	SDSS	EOS	1.4 km	MPC · JPL
750528	2014 WG_{24}	—	October 31, 2014	Mount Lemmon	Mount Lemmon Survey	L5	8.3 km	MPC · JPL
750529	2014 WC_{26}	—	December 31, 2007	Kitt Peak	Spacewatch	·	950 m	MPC · JPL
750530	2014 WW_{26}	—	January 8, 2011	Mount Lemmon	Mount Lemmon Survey	·	1.7 km	MPC · JPL
750531	2014 WH_{29}	—	July 13, 2013	Haleakala	Pan-STARRS 1	·	2.0 km	MPC · JPL
750532	2014 WN_{32}	—	January 30, 2011	Mount Lemmon	Mount Lemmon Survey	EOS	1.6 km	MPC · JPL
750533	2014 WQ_{38}	—	July 17, 2013	Haleakala	Pan-STARRS 1	·	1.9 km	MPC · JPL
750534	2014 WD_{39}	—	October 26, 2014	Mount Lemmon	Mount Lemmon Survey	·	1.8 km	MPC · JPL
750535	2014 WT_{42}	—	October 17, 2014	Kitt Peak	Spacewatch	·	1.6 km	MPC · JPL
750536	2014 WV_{43}	—	August 29, 2014	Mount Lemmon	Mount Lemmon Survey	·	490 m	MPC · JPL
750537	2014 WF_{47}	—	April 29, 2012	Kitt Peak	Spacewatch	·	1.8 km	MPC · JPL
750538	2014 WX_{49}	—	November 17, 2014	Haleakala	Pan-STARRS 1	·	610 m	MPC · JPL
750539	2014 WS_{50}	—	September 16, 2003	Kitt Peak	Spacewatch	·	1.6 km	MPC · JPL
750540	2014 WH_{52}	—	October 25, 2014	Kitt Peak	Spacewatch	·	3.2 km	MPC · JPL
750541	2014 WX_{52}	—	November 17, 2014	Haleakala	Pan-STARRS 1	·	1.6 km	MPC · JPL
750542	2014 WJ_{53}	—	November 17, 2014	Haleakala	Pan-STARRS 1	·	680 m	MPC · JPL
750543	2014 WS_{61}	—	September 27, 2009	Mount Lemmon	Mount Lemmon Survey	615	1.5 km	MPC · JPL
750544	2014 WJ_{63}	—	October 23, 2014	Kitt Peak	Spacewatch	EOS	1.2 km	MPC · JPL
750545	2014 WM_{63}	—	January 17, 2005	Kitt Peak	Spacewatch	·	1.5 km	MPC · JPL
750546	2014 WF_{64}	—	December 19, 2004	Mount Lemmon	Mount Lemmon Survey	·	520 m	MPC · JPL
750547	2014 WD_{66}	—	January 4, 2010	Kitt Peak	Spacewatch	·	1.6 km	MPC · JPL
750548	2014 WM_{66}	—	August 31, 2014	Haleakala	Pan-STARRS 1	·	590 m	MPC · JPL
750549	2014 WR_{68}	—	August 23, 2003	Palomar	NEAT	EOS	1.4 km	MPC · JPL
750550	2014 WL_{69}	—	November 18, 2014	Haleakala	Pan-STARRS 1	·	680 m	MPC · JPL
750551	2014 WL_{71}	—	October 18, 2014	Mount Lemmon	Mount Lemmon Survey	·	1.5 km	MPC · JPL
750552	2014 WW_{71}	—	November 13, 2007	Kitt Peak	Spacewatch	·	790 m	MPC · JPL
750553	2014 WY_{71}	—	November 27, 2010	Mount Lemmon	Mount Lemmon Survey	·	1.0 km	MPC · JPL
750554	2014 WC_{79}	—	November 17, 2014	Mount Lemmon	Mount Lemmon Survey	·	2.7 km	MPC · JPL
750555	2014 WG_{85}	—	August 31, 2014	Haleakala	Pan-STARRS 1	·	1.7 km	MPC · JPL
750556	2014 WS_{86}	—	November 4, 2005	Kitt Peak	Spacewatch	·	1.9 km	MPC · JPL
750557	2014 WB_{87}	—	October 18, 2014	Kitt Peak	Spacewatch	·	1.9 km	MPC · JPL
750558	2014 WH_{92}	—	November 17, 2014	Mount Lemmon	Mount Lemmon Survey	·	3.1 km	MPC · JPL
750559	2014 WK_{95}	—	November 12, 2007	Mount Lemmon	Mount Lemmon Survey	·	520 m	MPC · JPL
750560	2014 WY_{97}	—	August 31, 2014	Haleakala	Pan-STARRS 1	·	1.8 km	MPC · JPL
750561	2014 WF_{99}	—	October 30, 2014	Kitt Peak	Spacewatch	EOS	1.4 km	MPC · JPL
750562	2014 WP_{105}	—	September 14, 2007	Mount Lemmon	Mount Lemmon Survey	·	500 m	MPC · JPL
750563	2014 WD_{106}	—	October 25, 2014	Mount Lemmon	Mount Lemmon Survey	·	1.4 km	MPC · JPL
750564	2014 WH_{107}	—	October 20, 2003	Kitt Peak	Spacewatch	·	2.4 km	MPC · JPL
750565	2014 WK_{114}	—	August 29, 2014	Haleakala	Pan-STARRS 1	TIR	2.2 km	MPC · JPL
750566	2014 WR_{115}	—	September 30, 2014	Kitt Peak	Spacewatch	·	1.2 km	MPC · JPL
750567	2014 WH_{116}	—	October 11, 2005	Kitt Peak	Spacewatch	·	1.3 km	MPC · JPL
750568	2014 WR_{116}	—	October 31, 2014	Mount Lemmon	Mount Lemmon Survey	·	2.7 km	MPC · JPL
750569	2014 WJ_{119}	—	November 20, 2014	Mount Lemmon	Mount Lemmon Survey	NAE	1.9 km	MPC · JPL
750570	2014 WZ_{123}	—	November 16, 2014	Mount Lemmon	Mount Lemmon Survey	·	1.2 km	MPC · JPL
750571	2014 WQ_{125}	—	September 10, 2010	Mount Lemmon	Mount Lemmon Survey	·	740 m	MPC · JPL
750572	2014 WG_{126}	—	November 4, 2014	Mount Lemmon	Mount Lemmon Survey	·	3.3 km	MPC · JPL
750573	2014 WJ_{126}	—	February 4, 2012	Haleakala	Pan-STARRS 1	·	850 m	MPC · JPL
750574	2014 WZ_{131}	—	October 15, 2013	Mount Lemmon	Mount Lemmon Survey	L5	8.6 km	MPC · JPL
750575	2014 WA_{134}	—	November 17, 2014	Haleakala	Pan-STARRS 1	·	1.4 km	MPC · JPL
750576	2014 WO_{139}	—	November 17, 2014	Haleakala	Pan-STARRS 1	·	1.7 km	MPC · JPL
750577	2014 WH_{140}	—	November 17, 2014	Haleakala	Pan-STARRS 1	·	640 m	MPC · JPL
750578	2014 WS_{141}	—	November 17, 2014	Haleakala	Pan-STARRS 1	L5	7.1 km	MPC · JPL
750579	2014 WE_{143}	—	October 20, 2014	Kitt Peak	Spacewatch	·	1.1 km	MPC · JPL
750580	2014 WH_{143}	—	October 21, 2014	Kitt Peak	Spacewatch	·	1.8 km	MPC · JPL
750581	2014 WD_{144}	—	November 17, 2014	Haleakala	Pan-STARRS 1	AGN	940 m	MPC · JPL
750582	2014 WH_{149}	—	November 24, 2009	Kitt Peak	Spacewatch	·	1.3 km	MPC · JPL
750583	2014 WR_{151}	—	October 24, 2014	Kitt Peak	Spacewatch	·	2.0 km	MPC · JPL
750584	2014 WV_{155}	—	October 14, 2009	Mount Lemmon	Mount Lemmon Survey	·	1.4 km	MPC · JPL
750585	2014 WP_{158}	—	May 16, 2013	Mount Lemmon	Mount Lemmon Survey	·	1.5 km	MPC · JPL
750586	2014 WU_{161}	—	September 7, 2008	Mount Lemmon	Mount Lemmon Survey	·	1.7 km	MPC · JPL
750587	2014 WZ_{161}	—	September 20, 2014	Haleakala	Pan-STARRS 1	·	610 m	MPC · JPL
750588	2014 WH_{162}	—	December 16, 2007	Mount Lemmon	Mount Lemmon Survey	·	910 m	MPC · JPL
750589	2014 WN_{164}	—	November 19, 2014	Mount Lemmon	Mount Lemmon Survey	·	1.4 km	MPC · JPL
750590	2014 WK_{172}	—	October 15, 2014	Kitt Peak	Spacewatch	·	2.2 km	MPC · JPL
750591	2014 WV_{173}	—	November 20, 2014	Mount Lemmon	Mount Lemmon Survey	·	2.0 km	MPC · JPL
750592	2014 WH_{174}	—	September 25, 2005	Kitt Peak	Spacewatch	·	1.6 km	MPC · JPL
750593	2014 WK_{174}	—	August 25, 2014	Haleakala	Pan-STARRS 1	V	410 m	MPC · JPL
750594 Cîrstea	2014 WD_{178}	Cîrstea	September 22, 2014	La Palma	EURONEAR	·	900 m	MPC · JPL
750595	2014 WH_{179}	—	August 25, 2014	Haleakala	Pan-STARRS 1	·	1.4 km	MPC · JPL
750596	2014 WJ_{182}	—	August 25, 2014	Haleakala	Pan-STARRS 1	·	610 m	MPC · JPL
750597	2014 WC_{184}	—	October 8, 2008	Catalina	CSS	·	2.3 km	MPC · JPL
750598	2014 WQ_{184}	—	October 28, 2014	Mount Lemmon	Mount Lemmon Survey	·	2.0 km	MPC · JPL
750599	2014 WP_{185}	—	December 21, 2008	Catalina	CSS	·	3.6 km	MPC · JPL
750600	2014 WD_{188}	—	September 20, 2014	Haleakala	Pan-STARRS 1	·	1.4 km	MPC · JPL

== 750601–750700 ==
back to top

Designation			Discovery			Properties		Ref
Permanent	Provisional	Named after	Date	Site	Discoverer(s)	Category	Diam.	Ref
750601	2014 WN_{188}	—	September 4, 2014	Haleakala	Pan-STARRS 1	·	1.9 km	MPC · JPL
750602	2014 WL_{197}	—	July 14, 2013	Haleakala	Pan-STARRS 1	·	2.1 km	MPC · JPL
750603	2014 WN_{199}	—	May 15, 2013	Haleakala	Pan-STARRS 1	·	1.9 km	MPC · JPL
750604	2014 WR_{199}	—	June 18, 2013	Haleakala	Pan-STARRS 1	·	1.7 km	MPC · JPL
750605	2014 WW_{200}	—	September 30, 2003	Kitt Peak	Spacewatch	H	580 m	MPC · JPL
750606	2014 WB_{202}	—	November 22, 2014	Haleakala	Pan-STARRS 1	H	480 m	MPC · JPL
750607	2014 WJ_{203}	—	November 9, 2009	Kitt Peak	Spacewatch	EOS	1.5 km	MPC · JPL
750608	2014 WF_{211}	—	December 31, 2007	Mount Lemmon	Mount Lemmon Survey	·	920 m	MPC · JPL
750609	2014 WZ_{212}	—	January 17, 2005	Kitt Peak	Spacewatch	·	1.8 km	MPC · JPL
750610	2014 WW_{214}	—	September 19, 2014	Haleakala	Pan-STARRS 1	·	1.6 km	MPC · JPL
750611	2014 WA_{216}	—	November 10, 2014	Haleakala	Pan-STARRS 1	·	650 m	MPC · JPL
750612	2014 WY_{218}	—	October 25, 2014	Haleakala	Pan-STARRS 1	·	2.9 km	MPC · JPL
750613	2014 WL_{219}	—	October 25, 2014	Haleakala	Pan-STARRS 1	·	1.3 km	MPC · JPL
750614	2014 WZ_{219}	—	July 1, 2008	Kitt Peak	Spacewatch	EOS	1.4 km	MPC · JPL
750615	2014 WU_{225}	—	November 18, 2014	Haleakala	Pan-STARRS 1	EOS	1.4 km	MPC · JPL
750616	2014 WJ_{230}	—	September 9, 2007	Anderson Mesa	LONEOS	·	540 m	MPC · JPL
750617	2014 WT_{233}	—	September 20, 2014	Haleakala	Pan-STARRS 1	·	510 m	MPC · JPL
750618	2014 WX_{233}	—	December 4, 2005	Kitt Peak	Spacewatch	·	2.1 km	MPC · JPL
750619	2014 WO_{234}	—	November 20, 2014	Kitt Peak	Spacewatch	·	1.0 km	MPC · JPL
750620	2014 WY_{239}	—	October 4, 2007	Mount Lemmon	Mount Lemmon Survey	·	490 m	MPC · JPL
750621	2014 WJ_{240}	—	March 28, 2011	Kitt Peak	Spacewatch	·	1.8 km	MPC · JPL
750622	2014 WG_{244}	—	September 14, 1998	Kitt Peak	Spacewatch	·	2.4 km	MPC · JPL
750623	2014 WP_{246}	—	July 31, 2014	Haleakala	Pan-STARRS 1	·	600 m	MPC · JPL
750624	2014 WT_{246}	—	December 6, 2010	Mount Lemmon	Mount Lemmon Survey	·	1.8 km	MPC · JPL
750625	2014 WV_{247}	—	January 26, 2011	Mount Lemmon	Mount Lemmon Survey	·	1.5 km	MPC · JPL
750626	2014 WN_{250}	—	August 20, 2014	Haleakala	Pan-STARRS 1	·	1.9 km	MPC · JPL
750627	2014 WT_{250}	—	October 26, 2009	Kitt Peak	Spacewatch	·	2.5 km	MPC · JPL
750628	2014 WW_{250}	—	October 22, 2003	Kitt Peak	Spacewatch	·	2.7 km	MPC · JPL
750629	2014 WX_{257}	—	January 18, 2012	Mount Lemmon	Mount Lemmon Survey	·	530 m	MPC · JPL
750630	2014 WV_{262}	—	September 4, 2014	Haleakala	Pan-STARRS 1	·	2.1 km	MPC · JPL
750631	2014 WK_{266}	—	September 20, 2014	Haleakala	Pan-STARRS 1	EOS	1.4 km	MPC · JPL
750632	2014 WM_{267}	—	October 25, 2014	Mount Lemmon	Mount Lemmon Survey	·	1.7 km	MPC · JPL
750633	2014 WF_{274}	—	September 7, 2008	Mount Lemmon	Mount Lemmon Survey	·	1.6 km	MPC · JPL
750634	2014 WB_{276}	—	April 19, 2013	Haleakala	Pan-STARRS 1	·	700 m	MPC · JPL
750635	2014 WV_{276}	—	July 13, 2013	Haleakala	Pan-STARRS 1	·	1.3 km	MPC · JPL
750636	2014 WX_{282}	—	September 4, 2008	Kitt Peak	Spacewatch	·	1.9 km	MPC · JPL
750637	2014 WO_{284}	—	July 9, 2013	Haleakala	Pan-STARRS 1	·	820 m	MPC · JPL
750638	2014 WK_{285}	—	February 8, 2011	Mount Lemmon	Mount Lemmon Survey	·	1.5 km	MPC · JPL
750639	2014 WJ_{286}	—	November 21, 2014	Haleakala	Pan-STARRS 1	V	500 m	MPC · JPL
750640	2014 WS_{293}	—	September 18, 2014	Haleakala	Pan-STARRS 1	·	2.3 km	MPC · JPL
750641	2014 WZ_{293}	—	November 21, 2014	Haleakala	Pan-STARRS 1	·	2.6 km	MPC · JPL
750642	2014 WO_{297}	—	March 29, 2011	Mount Lemmon	Mount Lemmon Survey	EOS	1.5 km	MPC · JPL
750643	2014 WL_{302}	—	July 12, 2013	Haleakala	Pan-STARRS 1	·	2.3 km	MPC · JPL
750644	2014 WS_{303}	—	October 28, 2014	Haleakala	Pan-STARRS 1	·	2.9 km	MPC · JPL
750645	2014 WT_{303}	—	October 28, 2014	Haleakala	Pan-STARRS 1	EOS	1.2 km	MPC · JPL
750646	2014 WY_{306}	—	October 30, 2014	Mount Lemmon	Mount Lemmon Survey	EOS	1.4 km	MPC · JPL
750647	2014 WC_{307}	—	November 27, 2009	Mount Lemmon	Mount Lemmon Survey	·	1.4 km	MPC · JPL
750648	2014 WW_{308}	—	March 9, 2011	Mount Lemmon	Mount Lemmon Survey	EOS	1.2 km	MPC · JPL
750649	2014 WL_{310}	—	November 16, 2014	Mount Lemmon	Mount Lemmon Survey	EOS	1.6 km	MPC · JPL
750650	2014 WP_{310}	—	September 9, 2007	Kitt Peak	Spacewatch	·	580 m	MPC · JPL
750651	2014 WK_{312}	—	April 15, 2013	Haleakala	Pan-STARRS 1	·	1.9 km	MPC · JPL
750652	2014 WV_{312}	—	August 27, 2014	Haleakala	Pan-STARRS 1	·	1.6 km	MPC · JPL
750653	2014 WM_{322}	—	October 15, 2014	Kitt Peak	Spacewatch	EOS	1.3 km	MPC · JPL
750654	2014 WZ_{322}	—	May 31, 2008	Mount Lemmon	Mount Lemmon Survey	·	1.5 km	MPC · JPL
750655	2014 WR_{327}	—	November 22, 2014	Haleakala	Pan-STARRS 1	·	1.3 km	MPC · JPL
750656	2014 WV_{333}	—	August 31, 2014	Haleakala	Pan-STARRS 1	·	1.9 km	MPC · JPL
750657	2014 WH_{336}	—	September 20, 2014	Haleakala	Pan-STARRS 1	·	1.7 km	MPC · JPL
750658	2014 WT_{337}	—	September 28, 2003	Anderson Mesa	LONEOS	·	2.2 km	MPC · JPL
750659	2014 WU_{337}	—	November 22, 2014	Haleakala	Pan-STARRS 1	EOS	1.4 km	MPC · JPL
750660	2014 WS_{338}	—	August 14, 2001	Palomar	NEAT	·	1.2 km	MPC · JPL
750661	2014 WL_{341}	—	November 22, 2014	Haleakala	Pan-STARRS 1	·	1.8 km	MPC · JPL
750662	2014 WA_{344}	—	November 22, 2014	Haleakala	Pan-STARRS 1	·	1.2 km	MPC · JPL
750663	2014 WT_{346}	—	February 12, 2011	Mount Lemmon	Mount Lemmon Survey	EOS	1.3 km	MPC · JPL
750664	2014 WF_{348}	—	November 22, 2014	Haleakala	Pan-STARRS 1	EOS	1.5 km	MPC · JPL
750665	2014 WY_{348}	—	November 22, 2014	Haleakala	Pan-STARRS 1	·	2.2 km	MPC · JPL
750666	2014 WL_{350}	—	January 26, 2012	Haleakala	Pan-STARRS 1	·	570 m	MPC · JPL
750667	2014 WM_{351}	—	November 23, 2014	Haleakala	Pan-STARRS 1	·	1.9 km	MPC · JPL
750668	2014 WB_{352}	—	November 23, 2014	Mount Lemmon	Mount Lemmon Survey	·	1.3 km	MPC · JPL
750669	2014 WR_{353}	—	March 29, 2011	Catalina	CSS	·	2.7 km	MPC · JPL
750670	2014 WJ_{354}	—	November 23, 2014	Haleakala	Pan-STARRS 1	·	2.2 km	MPC · JPL
750671	2014 WW_{355}	—	November 23, 2014	Haleakala	Pan-STARRS 1	HNS	1.2 km	MPC · JPL
750672	2014 WR_{356}	—	April 4, 2002	Kitt Peak	Spacewatch	·	1.5 km	MPC · JPL
750673	2014 WG_{358}	—	November 18, 2009	Kitt Peak	Spacewatch	·	1.9 km	MPC · JPL
750674	2014 WK_{361}	—	December 10, 2009	Mount Lemmon	Mount Lemmon Survey	·	1.8 km	MPC · JPL
750675	2014 WS_{364}	—	October 26, 2014	Haleakala	Pan-STARRS 1	H	400 m	MPC · JPL
750676	2014 WN_{369}	—	November 27, 2014	Mount Lemmon	Mount Lemmon Survey	H	500 m	MPC · JPL
750677	2014 WT_{369}	—	November 27, 2014	Haleakala	Pan-STARRS 1	H	410 m	MPC · JPL
750678	2014 WA_{372}	—	September 26, 2008	Mount Lemmon	Mount Lemmon Survey	LIX	2.8 km	MPC · JPL
750679	2014 WP_{373}	—	November 22, 2014	Mount Lemmon	Mount Lemmon Survey	EOS	1.6 km	MPC · JPL
750680	2014 WO_{378}	—	May 28, 2012	Mount Lemmon	Mount Lemmon Survey	GAL	1.5 km	MPC · JPL
750681	2014 WE_{381}	—	December 21, 2003	Kitt Peak	Spacewatch	·	3.5 km	MPC · JPL
750682	2014 WV_{382}	—	October 17, 2003	Kitt Peak	Spacewatch	·	2.2 km	MPC · JPL
750683	2014 WR_{383}	—	February 23, 2012	Mount Lemmon	Mount Lemmon Survey	·	840 m	MPC · JPL
750684	2014 WV_{383}	—	December 17, 2009	Kitt Peak	Spacewatch	·	2.3 km	MPC · JPL
750685	2014 WN_{386}	—	October 30, 2014	Kitt Peak	Spacewatch	·	1.9 km	MPC · JPL
750686	2014 WD_{390}	—	October 4, 2014	Mount Lemmon	Mount Lemmon Survey	EOS	1.7 km	MPC · JPL
750687	2014 WU_{392}	—	November 24, 2014	Mount Lemmon	Mount Lemmon Survey	·	670 m	MPC · JPL
750688	2014 WH_{395}	—	November 25, 2014	Haleakala	Pan-STARRS 1	·	1.7 km	MPC · JPL
750689	2014 WO_{396}	—	November 25, 2014	Haleakala	Pan-STARRS 1	·	2.0 km	MPC · JPL
750690	2014 WW_{397}	—	October 30, 2014	Haleakala	Pan-STARRS 1	·	1.6 km	MPC · JPL
750691	2014 WY_{398}	—	September 23, 2014	Haleakala	Pan-STARRS 1	·	1.9 km	MPC · JPL
750692	2014 WY_{400}	—	July 8, 2013	Haleakala	Pan-STARRS 1	·	1.7 km	MPC · JPL
750693	2014 WO_{404}	—	November 15, 2003	Kitt Peak	Spacewatch	·	1.7 km	MPC · JPL
750694	2014 WA_{408}	—	November 26, 2014	Haleakala	Pan-STARRS 1	EUN	880 m	MPC · JPL
750695	2014 WP_{408}	—	November 26, 2014	Haleakala	Pan-STARRS 1	·	560 m	MPC · JPL
750696	2014 WS_{422}	—	November 26, 2014	Haleakala	Pan-STARRS 1	·	2.0 km	MPC · JPL
750697	2014 WF_{427}	—	November 26, 2014	Haleakala	Pan-STARRS 1	·	2.5 km	MPC · JPL
750698	2014 WA_{434}	—	November 27, 2014	Mount Lemmon	Mount Lemmon Survey	·	3.9 km	MPC · JPL
750699	2014 WZ_{434}	—	November 21, 2014	Haleakala	Pan-STARRS 1	·	1.3 km	MPC · JPL
750700	2014 WV_{435}	—	April 6, 2011	Kitt Peak	Spacewatch	VER	2.2 km	MPC · JPL

== 750701–750800 ==
back to top

Designation			Discovery			Properties		Ref
Permanent	Provisional	Named after	Date	Site	Discoverer(s)	Category	Diam.	Ref
750701	2014 WB_{437}	—	October 29, 2014	Kitt Peak	Spacewatch	EOS	1.6 km	MPC · JPL
750702	2014 WB_{438}	—	March 12, 2011	Mount Lemmon	Mount Lemmon Survey	·	1.9 km	MPC · JPL
750703	2014 WL_{441}	—	November 27, 2014	Haleakala	Pan-STARRS 1	·	2.3 km	MPC · JPL
750704	2014 WM_{444}	—	October 6, 2013	Kitt Peak	Spacewatch	L5	7.9 km	MPC · JPL
750705	2014 WW_{446}	—	November 27, 2014	Haleakala	Pan-STARRS 1	·	540 m	MPC · JPL
750706	2014 WD_{449}	—	November 27, 2014	Haleakala	Pan-STARRS 1	EOS	1.4 km	MPC · JPL
750707	2014 WE_{449}	—	September 3, 2008	Kitt Peak	Spacewatch	EOS	1.6 km	MPC · JPL
750708	2014 WX_{450}	—	August 12, 2013	Haleakala	Pan-STARRS 1	·	2.9 km	MPC · JPL
750709	2014 WF_{453}	—	September 4, 2014	Haleakala	Pan-STARRS 1	·	540 m	MPC · JPL
750710	2014 WB_{455}	—	July 16, 2013	Haleakala	Pan-STARRS 1	·	2.5 km	MPC · JPL
750711	2014 WZ_{455}	—	October 27, 2014	Haleakala	Pan-STARRS 1	·	1.4 km	MPC · JPL
750712	2014 WX_{457}	—	November 27, 2014	Haleakala	Pan-STARRS 1	·	640 m	MPC · JPL
750713	2014 WL_{464}	—	November 17, 2014	Haleakala	Pan-STARRS 1	·	1.5 km	MPC · JPL
750714	2014 WS_{464}	—	November 10, 2009	Kitt Peak	Spacewatch	·	1.5 km	MPC · JPL
750715	2014 WP_{465}	—	December 3, 2007	Kitt Peak	Spacewatch	·	710 m	MPC · JPL
750716	2014 WE_{466}	—	October 4, 2013	Mount Lemmon	Mount Lemmon Survey	L5	5.3 km	MPC · JPL
750717	2014 WL_{466}	—	November 17, 2014	Haleakala	Pan-STARRS 1	(5)	880 m	MPC · JPL
750718	2014 WD_{470}	—	March 6, 2011	Mount Lemmon	Mount Lemmon Survey	·	1.7 km	MPC · JPL
750719	2014 WF_{470}	—	November 19, 2014	Kitt Peak	Spacewatch	·	560 m	MPC · JPL
750720	2014 WA_{472}	—	September 20, 2014	Haleakala	Pan-STARRS 1	·	1.7 km	MPC · JPL
750721	2014 WT_{474}	—	October 1, 2008	Kitt Peak	Spacewatch	·	2.4 km	MPC · JPL
750722	2014 WV_{474}	—	November 16, 2009	Mount Lemmon	Mount Lemmon Survey	·	2.4 km	MPC · JPL
750723	2014 WC_{475}	—	November 28, 2014	Mount Lemmon	Mount Lemmon Survey	LIX	2.9 km	MPC · JPL
750724	2014 WQ_{477}	—	November 28, 2014	Haleakala	Pan-STARRS 1	·	2.8 km	MPC · JPL
750725	2014 WU_{482}	—	November 29, 2014	Kitt Peak	Spacewatch	EOS	1.4 km	MPC · JPL
750726	2014 WE_{486}	—	November 23, 2014	Mount Lemmon	Mount Lemmon Survey	EOS	1.9 km	MPC · JPL
750727	2014 WZ_{486}	—	November 21, 2014	Haleakala	Pan-STARRS 1	EOS	1.5 km	MPC · JPL
750728	2014 WY_{487}	—	November 27, 2014	Haleakala	Pan-STARRS 1	·	650 m	MPC · JPL
750729	2014 WM_{488}	—	November 27, 2014	Haleakala	Pan-STARRS 1	·	500 m	MPC · JPL
750730	2014 WV_{488}	—	November 24, 2014	Mount Lemmon	Mount Lemmon Survey	PHO	840 m	MPC · JPL
750731	2014 WE_{489}	—	October 22, 2003	Kitt Peak	Spacewatch	·	1.8 km	MPC · JPL
750732	2014 WM_{490}	—	November 20, 2014	Haleakala	Pan-STARRS 1	·	1.4 km	MPC · JPL
750733	2014 WG_{494}	—	November 28, 2014	Haleakala	Pan-STARRS 1	·	2.9 km	MPC · JPL
750734	2014 WO_{505}	—	November 24, 2008	Mount Lemmon	Mount Lemmon Survey	·	590 m	MPC · JPL
750735	2014 WB_{506}	—	September 23, 2014	Haleakala	Pan-STARRS 1	·	510 m	MPC · JPL
750736	2014 WT_{511}	—	November 22, 2014	Haleakala	Pan-STARRS 1	H	450 m	MPC · JPL
750737	2014 WU_{514}	—	November 26, 2014	Haleakala	Pan-STARRS 1	·	1.7 km	MPC · JPL
750738	2014 WQ_{515}	—	September 29, 2008	Mount Lemmon	Mount Lemmon Survey	·	2.2 km	MPC · JPL
750739	2014 WU_{515}	—	August 15, 2013	Haleakala	Pan-STARRS 1	·	2.0 km	MPC · JPL
750740	2014 WX_{517}	—	November 26, 2014	Haleakala	Pan-STARRS 1	·	2.8 km	MPC · JPL
750741	2014 WC_{519}	—	October 21, 2008	Mount Lemmon	Mount Lemmon Survey	·	2.0 km	MPC · JPL
750742	2014 WD_{519}	—	November 20, 2014	Haleakala	Pan-STARRS 1	ARM	2.3 km	MPC · JPL
750743	2014 WO_{519}	—	November 23, 2014	Mount Lemmon	Mount Lemmon Survey	LIX	2.6 km	MPC · JPL
750744	2014 WK_{520}	—	November 17, 2014	Mount Lemmon	Mount Lemmon Survey	(2076)	670 m	MPC · JPL
750745	2014 WS_{520}	—	January 18, 2012	Mount Lemmon	Mount Lemmon Survey	·	490 m	MPC · JPL
750746	2014 WB_{521}	—	November 17, 2014	Mount Lemmon	Mount Lemmon Survey	EOS	1.2 km	MPC · JPL
750747	2014 WV_{521}	—	November 29, 2014	Mount Lemmon	Mount Lemmon Survey	EOS	1.4 km	MPC · JPL
750748	2014 WG_{522}	—	October 23, 2003	Kitt Peak	Spacewatch	·	2.5 km	MPC · JPL
750749	2014 WT_{524}	—	June 11, 2012	Mount Lemmon	Mount Lemmon Survey	·	1.8 km	MPC · JPL
750750	2014 WC_{526}	—	November 21, 2014	Mount Lemmon	Mount Lemmon Survey	EOS	1.4 km	MPC · JPL
750751	2014 WP_{526}	—	July 13, 2013	Haleakala	Pan-STARRS 1	·	2.0 km	MPC · JPL
750752	2014 WS_{527}	—	November 8, 2013	Mount Lemmon	Mount Lemmon Survey	·	2.6 km	MPC · JPL
750753	2014 WB_{528}	—	November 21, 2014	Haleakala	Pan-STARRS 1	EOS	1.6 km	MPC · JPL
750754	2014 WP_{530}	—	November 26, 2014	Haleakala	Pan-STARRS 1	·	2.2 km	MPC · JPL
750755	2014 WT_{531}	—	April 24, 2012	Haleakala	Pan-STARRS 1	·	1.5 km	MPC · JPL
750756	2014 WB_{533}	—	November 27, 2014	Haleakala	Pan-STARRS 1	·	3.4 km	MPC · JPL
750757	2014 WF_{533}	—	July 15, 2013	Haleakala	Pan-STARRS 1	·	2.3 km	MPC · JPL
750758	2014 WQ_{533}	—	October 15, 2013	Mount Lemmon	Mount Lemmon Survey	·	2.6 km	MPC · JPL
750759	2014 WF_{534}	—	November 29, 2014	Haleakala	Pan-STARRS 1	·	2.6 km	MPC · JPL
750760	2014 WO_{534}	—	November 30, 2014	Haleakala	Pan-STARRS 1	EOS	1.3 km	MPC · JPL
750761	2014 WA_{535}	—	September 14, 2013	Westfield	T. Vorobjov	·	2.3 km	MPC · JPL
750762	2014 WD_{535}	—	September 5, 2007	Mount Lemmon	Mount Lemmon Survey	·	560 m	MPC · JPL
750763	2014 WR_{535}	—	September 14, 2007	Catalina	CSS	·	580 m	MPC · JPL
750764	2014 WY_{537}	—	November 24, 2014	Mount Lemmon	Mount Lemmon Survey	(2076)	550 m	MPC · JPL
750765	2014 WC_{538}	—	November 17, 2014	Haleakala	Pan-STARRS 1	·	550 m	MPC · JPL
750766	2014 WA_{539}	—	November 30, 2014	Catalina	CSS	EUP	2.5 km	MPC · JPL
750767	2014 WB_{543}	—	November 20, 2014	Mount Lemmon	Mount Lemmon Survey	·	1.7 km	MPC · JPL
750768	2014 WA_{544}	—	November 21, 2003	Socorro	LINEAR	·	1.9 km	MPC · JPL
750769	2014 WL_{544}	—	November 26, 2014	Haleakala	Pan-STARRS 1	·	2.4 km	MPC · JPL
750770	2014 WN_{544}	—	September 28, 2003	Socorro	LINEAR	·	1.4 km	MPC · JPL
750771	2014 WO_{544}	—	November 26, 2014	Haleakala	Pan-STARRS 1	EOS	1.7 km	MPC · JPL
750772	2014 WD_{545}	—	December 18, 2003	Kitt Peak	Spacewatch	·	2.1 km	MPC · JPL
750773	2014 WJ_{545}	—	September 29, 2008	Catalina	CSS	·	2.2 km	MPC · JPL
750774	2014 WE_{546}	—	November 20, 2014	Mount Lemmon	Mount Lemmon Survey	·	1.5 km	MPC · JPL
750775	2014 WK_{547}	—	September 5, 2008	Kitt Peak	Spacewatch	EOS	1.3 km	MPC · JPL
750776	2014 WP_{548}	—	October 5, 2002	Socorro	LINEAR	·	2.4 km	MPC · JPL
750777	2014 WT_{548}	—	November 20, 2014	Mount Lemmon	Mount Lemmon Survey	·	1.9 km	MPC · JPL
750778	2014 WH_{551}	—	November 22, 2014	Mount Lemmon	Mount Lemmon Survey	·	1.1 km	MPC · JPL
750779	2014 WK_{553}	—	November 26, 2014	Haleakala	Pan-STARRS 1	ADE	1.3 km	MPC · JPL
750780	2014 WN_{556}	—	November 27, 2014	Mount Lemmon	Mount Lemmon Survey	L5	9.0 km	MPC · JPL
750781	2014 WC_{561}	—	November 20, 2014	Mount Lemmon	Mount Lemmon Survey	L5	7.6 km	MPC · JPL
750782	2014 WN_{562}	—	November 26, 2014	Haleakala	Pan-STARRS 1	·	1.5 km	MPC · JPL
750783	2014 WX_{562}	—	November 21, 2014	Haleakala	Pan-STARRS 1	L5	7.2 km	MPC · JPL
750784	2014 WD_{568}	—	November 29, 2014	Mount Lemmon	Mount Lemmon Survey	·	1.2 km	MPC · JPL
750785	2014 WW_{568}	—	November 21, 2014	Haleakala	Pan-STARRS 1	L5	7.1 km	MPC · JPL
750786	2014 WY_{569}	—	November 27, 2014	Mount Lemmon	Mount Lemmon Survey	L5	7.4 km	MPC · JPL
750787	2014 WT_{570}	—	November 21, 2014	Haleakala	Pan-STARRS 1	L5	8.6 km	MPC · JPL
750788	2014 WD_{573}	—	November 20, 2014	Haleakala	Pan-STARRS 1	L5	7.6 km	MPC · JPL
750789	2014 WA_{574}	—	November 28, 2014	Kitt Peak	Spacewatch	·	650 m	MPC · JPL
750790	2014 WN_{574}	—	November 19, 2014	Haleakala	Pan-STARRS 1	L5	8.9 km	MPC · JPL
750791	2014 WS_{574}	—	November 22, 2014	Mount Lemmon	Mount Lemmon Survey	L5	7.2 km	MPC · JPL
750792	2014 WR_{575}	—	November 17, 2014	Haleakala	Pan-STARRS 1	·	1.3 km	MPC · JPL
750793	2014 WO_{578}	—	November 21, 2014	Haleakala	Pan-STARRS 1	L5	7.7 km	MPC · JPL
750794	2014 WP_{584}	—	November 17, 2014	Haleakala	Pan-STARRS 1	L5	7.4 km	MPC · JPL
750795	2014 WZ_{589}	—	November 21, 2014	Haleakala	Pan-STARRS 1	L5	6.9 km	MPC · JPL
750796	2014 WE_{591}	—	November 21, 2014	Haleakala	Pan-STARRS 1	·	570 m	MPC · JPL
750797	2014 WX_{591}	—	November 20, 2014	Haleakala	Pan-STARRS 1	L5	7.1 km	MPC · JPL
750798	2014 WD_{592}	—	November 21, 2014	Haleakala	Pan-STARRS 1	L5	6.1 km	MPC · JPL
750799	2014 WE_{595}	—	November 17, 2014	Haleakala	Pan-STARRS 1	·	910 m	MPC · JPL
750800	2014 WV_{595}	—	November 21, 2014	Haleakala	Pan-STARRS 1	URS	2.4 km	MPC · JPL

== 750801–750900 ==
back to top

Designation			Discovery			Properties		Ref
Permanent	Provisional	Named after	Date	Site	Discoverer(s)	Category	Diam.	Ref
750801	2014 WF_{596}	—	November 24, 2014	Haleakala	Pan-STARRS 1	PHO	890 m	MPC · JPL
750802	2014 XV_{1}	—	December 1, 2014	Haleakala	Pan-STARRS 1	·	2.3 km	MPC · JPL
750803	2014 XF_{5}	—	November 22, 2014	Haleakala	Pan-STARRS 1	·	560 m	MPC · JPL
750804	2014 XY_{5}	—	November 1, 2014	Mount Lemmon	Mount Lemmon Survey	·	730 m	MPC · JPL
750805	2014 XE_{7}	—	November 18, 2014	Kitt Peak	Spacewatch	L5	9.5 km	MPC · JPL
750806	2014 XF_{7}	—	April 21, 2010	WISE	WISE	L5	9.6 km	MPC · JPL
750807	2014 XT_{9}	—	December 8, 2014	Haleakala	Pan-STARRS 1	PHO	720 m	MPC · JPL
750808	2014 XO_{11}	—	November 16, 2014	Mount Lemmon	Mount Lemmon Survey	·	1.4 km	MPC · JPL
750809	2014 XP_{11}	—	November 21, 2014	Mount Lemmon	Mount Lemmon Survey	H	410 m	MPC · JPL
750810	2014 XY_{14}	—	December 10, 2014	Mount Lemmon	Mount Lemmon Survey	V	540 m	MPC · JPL
750811	2014 XB_{21}	—	May 7, 2010	Mount Lemmon	Mount Lemmon Survey	·	540 m	MPC · JPL
750812	2014 XH_{21}	—	November 19, 2014	Haleakala	Pan-STARRS 1	·	930 m	MPC · JPL
750813	2014 XL_{21}	—	November 30, 2014	Kitt Peak	Spacewatch	·	500 m	MPC · JPL
750814	2014 XT_{23}	—	December 11, 2014	Mount Lemmon	Mount Lemmon Survey	·	2.1 km	MPC · JPL
750815	2014 XO_{25}	—	December 27, 2011	Mount Lemmon	Mount Lemmon Survey	·	550 m	MPC · JPL
750816	2014 XV_{28}	—	October 16, 2014	Mount Lemmon	Mount Lemmon Survey	·	1.2 km	MPC · JPL
750817	2014 XC_{32}	—	December 20, 2001	Apache Point	SDSS	H	410 m	MPC · JPL
750818	2014 XU_{32}	—	November 17, 2014	Haleakala	Pan-STARRS 1	EOS	1.4 km	MPC · JPL
750819	2014 XQ_{33}	—	January 14, 2011	Kitt Peak	Spacewatch	·	1.4 km	MPC · JPL
750820	2014 XG_{40}	—	October 22, 2014	Mount Lemmon	Mount Lemmon Survey	L5	8.6 km	MPC · JPL
750821	2014 XM_{41}	—	December 27, 2014	Catalina	CSS	H	410 m	MPC · JPL
750822	2014 XW_{41}	—	December 1, 2014	Haleakala	Pan-STARRS 1	·	2.7 km	MPC · JPL
750823	2014 XJ_{44}	—	December 11, 2014	Mount Lemmon	Mount Lemmon Survey	·	640 m	MPC · JPL
750824	2014 XX_{44}	—	December 1, 2014	Haleakala	Pan-STARRS 1	TIR	2.4 km	MPC · JPL
750825	2014 XB_{45}	—	December 1, 2014	Haleakala	Pan-STARRS 1	·	2.6 km	MPC · JPL
750826	2014 XU_{50}	—	December 11, 2014	Mount Lemmon	Mount Lemmon Survey	·	870 m	MPC · JPL
750827	2014 XQ_{51}	—	December 11, 2014	Mount Lemmon	Mount Lemmon Survey	HNS	1.2 km	MPC · JPL
750828	2014 XL_{53}	—	December 1, 2014	Haleakala	Pan-STARRS 1	L5	8.4 km	MPC · JPL
750829	2014 YF_{2}	—	November 22, 2014	Haleakala	Pan-STARRS 1	·	2.6 km	MPC · JPL
750830	2014 YW_{4}	—	October 2, 2013	Haleakala	Pan-STARRS 1	·	2.6 km	MPC · JPL
750831	2014 YR_{6}	—	November 20, 2014	Mount Lemmon	Mount Lemmon Survey	T_{j} (2.96)	3.9 km	MPC · JPL
750832	2014 YM_{7}	—	December 20, 2014	Kitt Peak	Spacewatch	·	2.7 km	MPC · JPL
750833	2014 YM_{10}	—	December 18, 2014	Haleakala	Pan-STARRS 1	H	370 m	MPC · JPL
750834	2014 YB_{13}	—	October 20, 2001	Socorro	LINEAR	·	880 m	MPC · JPL
750835	2014 YN_{14}	—	November 22, 2009	Kitt Peak	Spacewatch	H	460 m	MPC · JPL
750836	2014 YD_{17}	—	December 20, 2014	Haleakala	Pan-STARRS 1	·	2.2 km	MPC · JPL
750837	2014 YZ_{18}	—	November 17, 2014	Haleakala	Pan-STARRS 1	·	450 m	MPC · JPL
750838	2014 YE_{19}	—	January 17, 2009	Mount Lemmon	Mount Lemmon Survey	·	720 m	MPC · JPL
750839	2014 YJ_{20}	—	August 9, 2013	Haleakala	Pan-STARRS 1	EOS	1.4 km	MPC · JPL
750840	2014 YF_{21}	—	November 22, 2014	Haleakala	Pan-STARRS 1	·	1.8 km	MPC · JPL
750841	2014 YX_{21}	—	November 27, 2014	Mount Lemmon	Mount Lemmon Survey	·	2.8 km	MPC · JPL
750842	2014 YZ_{21}	—	November 26, 2014	Haleakala	Pan-STARRS 1	·	2.3 km	MPC · JPL
750843	2014 YJ_{22}	—	December 18, 2003	Kitt Peak	Spacewatch	·	2.3 km	MPC · JPL
750844	2014 YA_{23}	—	December 21, 2014	Haleakala	Pan-STARRS 1	·	2.2 km	MPC · JPL
750845	2014 YU_{23}	—	January 18, 2004	Catalina	CSS	·	1.4 km	MPC · JPL
750846	2014 YL_{28}	—	September 19, 2007	Dauban	C. Rinner, F. Kugel	·	2.7 km	MPC · JPL
750847	2014 YB_{29}	—	December 24, 2014	Mount Lemmon	Mount Lemmon Survey	·	2.3 km	MPC · JPL
750848	2014 YO_{33}	—	December 27, 2014	Mount Lemmon	Mount Lemmon Survey	·	2.7 km	MPC · JPL
750849	2014 YP_{35}	—	October 21, 2014	Nogales	M. Schwartz, P. R. Holvorcem	·	2.6 km	MPC · JPL
750850	2014 YG_{38}	—	December 26, 2014	Haleakala	Pan-STARRS 1	·	3.2 km	MPC · JPL
750851	2014 YU_{44}	—	October 6, 2008	Catalina	CSS	·	2.5 km	MPC · JPL
750852	2014 YQ_{51}	—	December 19, 2014	Haleakala	Pan-STARRS 1	H	490 m	MPC · JPL
750853	2014 YX_{51}	—	December 26, 2014	Haleakala	Pan-STARRS 1	H	410 m	MPC · JPL
750854	2014 YJ_{55}	—	February 27, 2012	Haleakala	Pan-STARRS 1	V	430 m	MPC · JPL
750855	2014 YF_{56}	—	November 3, 2008	Mount Lemmon	Mount Lemmon Survey	·	2.4 km	MPC · JPL
750856	2014 YY_{58}	—	December 21, 2014	Haleakala	Pan-STARRS 1	·	2.7 km	MPC · JPL
750857	2014 YF_{59}	—	December 21, 2014	Haleakala	Pan-STARRS 1	VER	2.9 km	MPC · JPL
750858	2014 YS_{59}	—	December 21, 2014	Haleakala	Pan-STARRS 1	·	2.6 km	MPC · JPL
750859	2014 YX_{59}	—	December 21, 2014	Haleakala	Pan-STARRS 1	·	2.4 km	MPC · JPL
750860	2014 YM_{60}	—	December 21, 2014	Haleakala	Pan-STARRS 1	·	510 m	MPC · JPL
750861	2014 YT_{60}	—	December 21, 2014	Haleakala	Pan-STARRS 1	·	2.2 km	MPC · JPL
750862	2014 YD_{62}	—	December 29, 2014	Haleakala	Pan-STARRS 1	·	3.0 km	MPC · JPL
750863	2014 YD_{64}	—	December 18, 2014	Haleakala	Pan-STARRS 1	·	490 m	MPC · JPL
750864	2014 YT_{67}	—	December 15, 2014	Mount Lemmon	Mount Lemmon Survey	·	2.5 km	MPC · JPL
750865	2014 YA_{68}	—	December 21, 2014	Haleakala	Pan-STARRS 1	·	620 m	MPC · JPL
750866	2014 YW_{72}	—	March 29, 2009	Kitt Peak	Spacewatch	·	700 m	MPC · JPL
750867	2014 YM_{73}	—	December 26, 2014	Haleakala	Pan-STARRS 1	·	2.8 km	MPC · JPL
750868	2014 YB_{75}	—	December 21, 2014	Haleakala	Pan-STARRS 1	·	1 km	MPC · JPL
750869	2014 YT_{76}	—	December 24, 2014	Mount Lemmon	Mount Lemmon Survey	·	2.1 km	MPC · JPL
750870	2014 YV_{77}	—	December 29, 2014	Haleakala	Pan-STARRS 1	·	920 m	MPC · JPL
750871	2014 YR_{80}	—	December 26, 2014	Haleakala	Pan-STARRS 1	EOS	1.5 km	MPC · JPL
750872	2014 YH_{82}	—	December 29, 2014	Haleakala	Pan-STARRS 1	·	540 m	MPC · JPL
750873	2014 YS_{84}	—	December 29, 2014	Mount Lemmon	Mount Lemmon Survey	·	590 m	MPC · JPL
750874	2015 AD_{1}	—	January 8, 2015	Haleakala	Pan-STARRS 1	·	940 m	MPC · JPL
750875	2015 AG_{7}	—	February 16, 2010	Kitt Peak	Spacewatch	·	2.4 km	MPC · JPL
750876	2015 AN_{7}	—	September 4, 2008	Kitt Peak	Spacewatch	·	1.7 km	MPC · JPL
750877	2015 AY_{7}	—	March 30, 2011	Mount Lemmon	Mount Lemmon Survey	·	1.6 km	MPC · JPL
750878	2015 AR_{8}	—	April 11, 2010	Mount Lemmon	Mount Lemmon Survey	·	2.8 km	MPC · JPL
750879	2015 AT_{12}	—	September 9, 2013	Haleakala	Pan-STARRS 1	·	2.6 km	MPC · JPL
750880	2015 AU_{13}	—	November 21, 2014	Haleakala	Pan-STARRS 1	ELF	2.8 km	MPC · JPL
750881	2015 AF_{14}	—	March 26, 2011	Kitt Peak	Spacewatch	·	1.8 km	MPC · JPL
750882	2015 AJ_{18}	—	September 29, 2008	Mount Lemmon	Mount Lemmon Survey	·	2.1 km	MPC · JPL
750883	2015 AU_{18}	—	December 20, 2004	Mount Lemmon	Mount Lemmon Survey	BAP	770 m	MPC · JPL
750884	2015 AB_{19}	—	October 25, 2014	Haleakala	Pan-STARRS 1	·	610 m	MPC · JPL
750885	2015 AW_{20}	—	December 19, 2003	Kitt Peak	Spacewatch	·	2.4 km	MPC · JPL
750886	2015 AF_{21}	—	August 9, 2013	Haleakala	Pan-STARRS 1	EOS	1.4 km	MPC · JPL
750887	2015 AH_{24}	—	September 24, 2008	Mount Lemmon	Mount Lemmon Survey	EOS	1.6 km	MPC · JPL
750888	2015 AS_{24}	—	November 28, 2014	Kitt Peak	Spacewatch	·	810 m	MPC · JPL
750889	2015 AX_{26}	—	April 18, 2012	Mount Lemmon	Mount Lemmon Survey	·	520 m	MPC · JPL
750890	2015 AH_{27}	—	April 28, 2011	Kitt Peak	Spacewatch	·	2.4 km	MPC · JPL
750891	2015 AW_{27}	—	November 2, 2008	Mount Lemmon	Mount Lemmon Survey	·	2.5 km	MPC · JPL
750892	2015 AA_{28}	—	March 22, 2012	Mount Lemmon	Mount Lemmon Survey	·	830 m	MPC · JPL
750893	2015 AO_{29}	—	March 14, 2012	Kitt Peak	Spacewatch	·	550 m	MPC · JPL
750894	2015 AX_{30}	—	January 13, 2015	Haleakala	Pan-STARRS 1	EOS	1.6 km	MPC · JPL
750895	2015 AZ_{31}	—	January 13, 2015	Haleakala	Pan-STARRS 1	·	2.3 km	MPC · JPL
750896	2015 AB_{32}	—	December 21, 2014	Haleakala	Pan-STARRS 1	·	750 m	MPC · JPL
750897	2015 AX_{32}	—	October 22, 2008	Kitt Peak	Spacewatch	TEL	1.2 km	MPC · JPL
750898	2015 AB_{33}	—	October 28, 2014	Haleakala	Pan-STARRS 1	·	1.8 km	MPC · JPL
750899	2015 AV_{33}	—	November 5, 2004	Kitt Peak	Spacewatch	·	590 m	MPC · JPL
750900	2015 AU_{34}	—	February 16, 2012	Haleakala	Pan-STARRS 1	·	650 m	MPC · JPL

== 750901–751000 ==
back to top

Designation			Discovery			Properties		Ref
Permanent	Provisional	Named after	Date	Site	Discoverer(s)	Category	Diam.	Ref
750901	2015 AG_{37}	—	July 17, 2001	Palomar	NEAT	·	1.2 km	MPC · JPL
750902	2015 AB_{40}	—	December 29, 2014	Mount Lemmon	Mount Lemmon Survey	·	2.6 km	MPC · JPL
750903	2015 AC_{40}	—	February 26, 2004	Kitt Peak	Deep Ecliptic Survey	VER	2.0 km	MPC · JPL
750904	2015 AH_{40}	—	December 21, 2014	Haleakala	Pan-STARRS 1	·	610 m	MPC · JPL
750905	2015 AL_{44}	—	July 29, 2008	Mount Lemmon	Mount Lemmon Survey	H	560 m	MPC · JPL
750906	2015 AH_{48}	—	January 12, 2015	Haleakala	Pan-STARRS 1	L5	7.5 km	MPC · JPL
750907	2015 AF_{54}	—	January 13, 2015	Haleakala	Pan-STARRS 1	·	2.3 km	MPC · JPL
750908	2015 AH_{54}	—	December 15, 2014	Kitt Peak	Spacewatch	HNS	970 m	MPC · JPL
750909	2015 AD_{55}	—	December 14, 2010	Mount Lemmon	Mount Lemmon Survey	·	730 m	MPC · JPL
750910	2015 AL_{55}	—	January 13, 2015	Haleakala	Pan-STARRS 1	·	2.4 km	MPC · JPL
750911	2015 AW_{55}	—	January 13, 2015	Haleakala	Pan-STARRS 1	EOS	1.4 km	MPC · JPL
750912	2015 AX_{55}	—	January 13, 2015	Haleakala	Pan-STARRS 1	HYG	2.1 km	MPC · JPL
750913	2015 AR_{56}	—	December 29, 2014	Mount Lemmon	Mount Lemmon Survey	·	2.5 km	MPC · JPL
750914	2015 AT_{57}	—	December 29, 2014	Mount Lemmon	Mount Lemmon Survey	·	920 m	MPC · JPL
750915	2015 AL_{59}	—	July 28, 2009	Kitt Peak	Spacewatch	ERI	1.2 km	MPC · JPL
750916	2015 AM_{59}	—	January 1, 2009	Mount Lemmon	Mount Lemmon Survey	EOS	1.9 km	MPC · JPL
750917	2015 AN_{60}	—	November 2, 2007	Kitt Peak	Spacewatch	·	520 m	MPC · JPL
750918	2015 AA_{61}	—	December 6, 2007	Mount Lemmon	Mount Lemmon Survey	·	590 m	MPC · JPL
750919	2015 AL_{61}	—	February 7, 2008	Kitt Peak	Spacewatch	·	820 m	MPC · JPL
750920	2015 AB_{65}	—	January 13, 2015	Haleakala	Pan-STARRS 1	EOS	1.8 km	MPC · JPL
750921	2015 AH_{71}	—	December 29, 2014	Mount Lemmon	Mount Lemmon Survey	·	3.6 km	MPC · JPL
750922	2015 AM_{74}	—	September 24, 2008	Mount Lemmon	Mount Lemmon Survey	·	1.9 km	MPC · JPL
750923	2015 AO_{74}	—	January 13, 2015	Haleakala	Pan-STARRS 1	·	960 m	MPC · JPL
750924	2015 AZ_{84}	—	January 13, 2015	Haleakala	Pan-STARRS 1	EOS	1.7 km	MPC · JPL
750925	2015 AB_{92}	—	January 13, 2015	Haleakala	Pan-STARRS 1	·	1.2 km	MPC · JPL
750926	2015 AA_{99}	—	December 4, 2007	Kitt Peak	Spacewatch	·	570 m	MPC · JPL
750927	2015 AS_{99}	—	November 18, 2014	Mount Lemmon	Mount Lemmon Survey	·	2.8 km	MPC · JPL
750928	2015 AG_{100}	—	December 21, 2014	Haleakala	Pan-STARRS 1	TIR	1.8 km	MPC · JPL
750929	2015 AW_{101}	—	December 21, 2014	Mount Lemmon	Mount Lemmon Survey	·	2.3 km	MPC · JPL
750930	2015 AT_{102}	—	October 28, 2013	Mount Lemmon	Mount Lemmon Survey	·	2.3 km	MPC · JPL
750931	2015 AG_{107}	—	August 29, 2006	Kitt Peak	Spacewatch	·	730 m	MPC · JPL
750932	2015 AB_{108}	—	September 5, 2013	Kitt Peak	Spacewatch	THM	2.0 km	MPC · JPL
750933	2015 AA_{110}	—	December 21, 2014	Mount Lemmon	Mount Lemmon Survey	·	2.4 km	MPC · JPL
750934	2015 AA_{113}	—	December 21, 2014	Haleakala	Pan-STARRS 1	·	800 m	MPC · JPL
750935	2015 AK_{113}	—	September 7, 2008	Mount Lemmon	Mount Lemmon Survey	·	1.4 km	MPC · JPL
750936	2015 AR_{113}	—	May 4, 2005	Mauna Kea	Veillet, C.	·	1.7 km	MPC · JPL
750937	2015 AU_{115}	—	December 21, 2014	Mount Lemmon	Mount Lemmon Survey	·	2.5 km	MPC · JPL
750938	2015 AC_{119}	—	March 12, 2010	Kitt Peak	Spacewatch	·	2.1 km	MPC · JPL
750939	2015 AZ_{122}	—	September 18, 2006	Anderson Mesa	LONEOS	·	750 m	MPC · JPL
750940	2015 AJ_{128}	—	January 2, 2009	Mount Lemmon	Mount Lemmon Survey	·	2.8 km	MPC · JPL
750941	2015 AL_{131}	—	August 22, 1995	Kitt Peak	Spacewatch	·	2.2 km	MPC · JPL
750942	2015 AW_{133}	—	August 21, 2012	Haleakala	Pan-STARRS 1	EOS	1.9 km	MPC · JPL
750943	2015 AA_{134}	—	December 21, 2014	Haleakala	Pan-STARRS 1	·	1.4 km	MPC · JPL
750944	2015 AJ_{138}	—	March 16, 2005	Kitt Peak	Spacewatch	·	570 m	MPC · JPL
750945	2015 AN_{138}	—	January 8, 2011	Kitt Peak	Spacewatch	·	1.2 km	MPC · JPL
750946	2015 AS_{151}	—	January 14, 2015	Haleakala	Pan-STARRS 1	·	2.0 km	MPC · JPL
750947	2015 AG_{152}	—	December 21, 2014	Haleakala	Pan-STARRS 1	HYG	2.2 km	MPC · JPL
750948	2015 AF_{153}	—	December 21, 2014	Haleakala	Pan-STARRS 1	·	2.7 km	MPC · JPL
750949	2015 AJ_{155}	—	January 13, 2008	Kitt Peak	Spacewatch	·	600 m	MPC · JPL
750950	2015 AH_{157}	—	December 21, 2014	Haleakala	Pan-STARRS 1	·	2.4 km	MPC · JPL
750951	2015 AG_{160}	—	February 16, 2010	Mount Lemmon	Mount Lemmon Survey	THM	2.1 km	MPC · JPL
750952	2015 AD_{165}	—	November 26, 2014	Haleakala	Pan-STARRS 1	·	3.1 km	MPC · JPL
750953	2015 AY_{166}	—	January 14, 2015	Haleakala	Pan-STARRS 1	·	1.6 km	MPC · JPL
750954	2015 AC_{167}	—	November 4, 2013	Mount Lemmon	Mount Lemmon Survey	HYG	2.3 km	MPC · JPL
750955	2015 AM_{168}	—	March 13, 2010	Mount Lemmon	Mount Lemmon Survey	THM	1.7 km	MPC · JPL
750956	2015 AN_{168}	—	December 21, 2014	Haleakala	Pan-STARRS 1	(5)	1.0 km	MPC · JPL
750957	2015 AC_{173}	—	June 18, 2013	Haleakala	Pan-STARRS 1	·	700 m	MPC · JPL
750958	2015 AH_{173}	—	April 21, 2009	Kitt Peak	Spacewatch	·	710 m	MPC · JPL
750959	2015 AD_{174}	—	January 14, 2015	Haleakala	Pan-STARRS 1	·	1.3 km	MPC · JPL
750960	2015 AC_{177}	—	January 14, 2015	Haleakala	Pan-STARRS 1	·	2.5 km	MPC · JPL
750961	2015 AE_{179}	—	January 14, 2015	Haleakala	Pan-STARRS 1	NYS	910 m	MPC · JPL
750962	2015 AH_{179}	—	June 1, 2005	Mount Lemmon	Mount Lemmon Survey	·	2.8 km	MPC · JPL
750963	2015 AQ_{182}	—	January 19, 2004	Kitt Peak	Spacewatch	·	2.2 km	MPC · JPL
750964	2015 AU_{185}	—	October 2, 2008	Mount Lemmon	Mount Lemmon Survey	·	1.4 km	MPC · JPL
750965	2015 AO_{186}	—	August 19, 2012	Tenerife	ESA OGS	·	2.2 km	MPC · JPL
750966	2015 AK_{187}	—	November 29, 2014	Haleakala	Pan-STARRS 1	·	1.7 km	MPC · JPL
750967	2015 AJ_{188}	—	September 4, 2007	Mount Lemmon	Mount Lemmon Survey	·	580 m	MPC · JPL
750968	2015 AS_{188}	—	January 14, 2015	Haleakala	Pan-STARRS 1	·	1.6 km	MPC · JPL
750969	2015 AK_{189}	—	April 12, 2012	Haleakala	Pan-STARRS 1	·	770 m	MPC · JPL
750970	2015 AB_{191}	—	January 14, 2015	Haleakala	Pan-STARRS 1	·	2.2 km	MPC · JPL
750971	2015 AY_{193}	—	March 10, 2011	Kitt Peak	Spacewatch	·	1.4 km	MPC · JPL
750972	2015 AN_{197}	—	June 9, 2012	Mount Lemmon	Mount Lemmon Survey	·	2.8 km	MPC · JPL
750973	2015 AQ_{199}	—	March 3, 1997	Kitt Peak	Spacewatch	·	940 m	MPC · JPL
750974	2015 AT_{199}	—	October 10, 2008	Mount Lemmon	Mount Lemmon Survey	·	1.9 km	MPC · JPL
750975	2015 AY_{199}	—	December 26, 2014	Haleakala	Pan-STARRS 1	·	1.6 km	MPC · JPL
750976	2015 AN_{200}	—	August 15, 2013	Haleakala	Pan-STARRS 1	·	2.3 km	MPC · JPL
750977	2015 AP_{201}	—	November 7, 2008	Mount Lemmon	Mount Lemmon Survey	·	2.2 km	MPC · JPL
750978	2015 AH_{206}	—	January 15, 2015	Mount Lemmon	Mount Lemmon Survey	VER	2.6 km	MPC · JPL
750979	2015 AJ_{207}	—	December 10, 2006	Kitt Peak	Spacewatch	·	1.0 km	MPC · JPL
750980	2015 AN_{207}	—	February 26, 2012	Haleakala	Pan-STARRS 1	·	790 m	MPC · JPL
750981	2015 AV_{208}	—	July 13, 2013	Haleakala	Pan-STARRS 1	·	2.2 km	MPC · JPL
750982	2015 AN_{212}	—	April 15, 2012	Haleakala	Pan-STARRS 1	·	1.7 km	MPC · JPL
750983	2015 AF_{217}	—	January 15, 2015	Haleakala	Pan-STARRS 1	·	2.3 km	MPC · JPL
750984	2015 AZ_{217}	—	September 14, 2013	Haleakala	Pan-STARRS 1	·	2.5 km	MPC · JPL
750985	2015 AP_{219}	—	October 7, 2008	Mount Lemmon	Mount Lemmon Survey	·	2.7 km	MPC · JPL
750986	2015 AT_{219}	—	January 28, 2007	Kitt Peak	Spacewatch	H	510 m	MPC · JPL
750987	2015 AY_{219}	—	May 21, 2011	Bergisch Gladbach	W. Bickel	·	2.6 km	MPC · JPL
750988	2015 AH_{223}	—	September 28, 2013	Mount Lemmon	Mount Lemmon Survey	EOS	1.4 km	MPC · JPL
750989	2015 AZ_{227}	—	August 15, 2013	La Sagra	OAM	T_{j} (2.96)	3.3 km	MPC · JPL
750990	2015 AW_{228}	—	January 15, 2015	Haleakala	Pan-STARRS 1	·	1.4 km	MPC · JPL
750991	2015 AX_{243}	—	September 14, 2013	Haleakala	Pan-STARRS 1	·	960 m	MPC · JPL
750992	2015 AQ_{246}	—	October 25, 2014	Haleakala	Pan-STARRS 1	·	1.6 km	MPC · JPL
750993	2015 AM_{247}	—	September 10, 2010	Kitt Peak	Spacewatch	·	560 m	MPC · JPL
750994	2015 AW_{248}	—	March 15, 2012	Mount Lemmon	Mount Lemmon Survey	·	540 m	MPC · JPL
750995	2015 AZ_{252}	—	March 4, 2012	Mount Lemmon	Mount Lemmon Survey	·	480 m	MPC · JPL
750996	2015 AG_{253}	—	December 31, 2007	Kitt Peak	Spacewatch	·	470 m	MPC · JPL
750997	2015 AX_{254}	—	January 15, 2015	Haleakala	Pan-STARRS 1	·	2.3 km	MPC · JPL
750998	2015 AH_{255}	—	February 28, 2008	Mount Lemmon	Mount Lemmon Survey	·	1.1 km	MPC · JPL
750999	2015 AQ_{255}	—	May 10, 2013	Elena Remote	Oreshko, A.	H	520 m	MPC · JPL
751000	2015 AD_{256}	—	January 15, 2015	Kitt Peak	Spacewatch	H	360 m	MPC · JPL

back to top

== Meaning of names ==
As minor planet discoveries are confirmed, they are given a permanent number by the IAU's Minor Planet Center (MPC), and the discoverers can then submit names for them, following the IAU's naming conventions. The list below concerns those minor planets in the specified number-range that have received names, and explains the meanings of those names.

Official naming citations of newly named small Solar System bodies are approved and published in a bulletin by IAU's Working Group for Small Bodies Nomenclature (WGSBN). Before May 2021, citations were published in MPC's Minor Planet Circulars for many decades. Recent citations can also be found on the JPL Small-Body Database (SBDB). Until his death in 2016, German astronomer Lutz D. Schmadel compiled these citations into the Dictionary of Minor Planet Names (DMP) and regularly updated the collection.

Based on Paul Herget's The Names of the Minor Planets, Schmadel also researched the unclear origin of numerous asteroids, most of which had been named prior to World War II. This article incorporates text from this source, which is in the public domain: SBDB New namings may only be added to this list below after official publication as the preannouncement of names is condemned. The WGSBN publishes a comprehensive guideline for the naming rules of non-cometary small Solar System bodies.

Named minor planet	Provisional	This minor planet was named for...	Ref · Catalog
750032 Jinca	2014 QB_{375}	Marcel Jinca, Romanian amateur astronomer.	IAU · 750032
750594 Cîrstea	2014 WD_{178}	Remus Cîrstea, Romanian TV-Multimedia lecturer at the University Politehnica Bucharest, former museograph and TV producer.	IAU · 750594
