= List of named minor planets: 3000–3999 =

This is a partial list of named minor planets in numerical order. It contains a total of 1,000 entries as of 20 March 2026. Minor planets for which no article exist are displayed in grey color and redirect to the list of minor planets (see List of minor planets § Main index).

== From 3,000 to 3,999 ==
- 3000 Leonardo
- 3001 Michelangelo
- 3002 Delasalle
- 3003 Konček
- 3004 Knud
- 3005 Pervictoralex
- 3006 Livadia
- 3007 Reaves
- 3008 Nojiri
- 3009 Coventry
- 3010 Ushakov
- 3011 Chongqing
- 3012 Minsk
- 3013 Dobrovoleva
- 3014 Huangsushu
- 3015 Candy
- 3016 Meuse
- 3017 Petrovič
- 3018 Godiva
- 3019 Kulin
- 3020 Naudts
- 3021 Lucubratio
- 3022 Dobermann
- 3023 Heard
- 3024 Hainan
- 3025 Higson
- 3026 Sarastro
- 3027 Shavarsh
- 3028 Zhangguoxi
- 3029 Sanders
- 3030 Vehrenberg
- 3031 Houston
- 3032 Evans
- 3033 Holbaek
- 3034 Climenhaga
- 3035 Chambers
- 3036 Krat
- 3037 Alku
- 3038 Bernes
- 3039 Yangel
- 3040 Kozai
- 3041 Webb
- 3042 Zelinsky
- 3043 San Diego
- 3044 Saltykov
- 3045 Alois
- 3046 Molière
- 3047 Goethe
- 3048 Guangzhou
- 3049 Kuzbass
- 3050 Carrera
- 3051 Nantong
- 3052 Herzen
- 3053 Dresden
- 3054 Strugatskia
- 3055 Annapavlova
- 3056 INAG
- 3057 Mälaren
- 3058 Delmary
- 3059 Pryor
- 3060 Delcano
- 3061 Cook
- 3062 Wren
- 3063 Makhaon
- 3064 Zimmer
- 3065 Sarahill
- 3066 McFadden
- 3067 Akhmatova
- 3068 Khanina
- 3069 Heyrovský
- 3070 Aitken
- 3071 Nesterov
- 3072 Vilnius
- 3073 Kursk
- 3074 Popov
- 3075 Bornmann
- 3076 Garber
- 3077 Henderson
- 3078 Horrocks
- 3079 Schiller
- 3080 Moisseiev
- 3081 Martinůboh
- 3082 Dzhalil
- 3083 OAFA
- 3084 Kondratyuk
- 3085 Donna
- 3086 Kalbaugh
- 3087 Beatrice Tinsley
- 3088 Jinxiuzhonghua
- 3089 Oujianquan
- 3090 Tjossem
- 3091 van den Heuvel
- 3092 Herodotus
- 3093 Bergholz
- 3094 Chukokkala
- 3095 Omarkhayyam
- 3096 Bezruč
- 3097 Tacitus
- 3098 van Sprang
- 3099 Hergenrother
- 3100 Zimmerman
- 3101 Goldberger
- 3102 Krok
- 3103 Eger
- 3104 Dürer
- 3105 Stumpff
- 3106 Morabito
- 3107 Weaver
- 3108 Lyubov
- 3109 Machin
- 3110 Wagman
- 3111 Misuzu
- 3112 Velimir
- 3113 Chizhevskij
- 3114 Ercilla
- 3115 Baily
- 3116 Goodricke
- 3117 Niépce
- 3118 Claytonsmith
- 3119 Dobronravin
- 3120 Dangrania
- 3121 Tamines
- 3122 Florence
- 3123 Dunham
- 3124 Kansas
- 3125 Hay
- 3126 Davydov
- 3127 Bagration
- 3128 Obruchev
- 3129 Bonestell
- 3130 Hillary
- 3131 Mason-Dixon
- 3132 Landgraf
- 3133 Sendai
- 3134 Kostinsky
- 3135 Lauer
- 3136 Anshan
- 3137 Horky
- 3138 Ciney
- 3139 Shantou
- 3140 Stellafane
- 3141 Buchar
- 3142 Kilopi
- 3143 Genecampbell
- 3144 Brosche
- 3145 Walter Adams
- 3146 Dato
- 3147 Samantha
- 3148 Grechko
- 3149 Okudzhava
- 3150 Tosa
- 3151 Talbot
- 3152 Jones
- 3153 Lincoln
- 3154 Grant
- 3155 Lee
- 3156 Ellington
- 3157 Novikov
- 3158 Anga
- 3159 Prokofʹev
- 3160 Angerhofer
- 3161 Beadell
- 3162 Nostalgia
- 3163 Randi
- 3164 Prast
- 3165 Mikawa
- 3166 Klondike
- 3167 Babcock
- 3168 Lomnický Štít
- 3169 Ostro
- 3170 Dzhanibekov
- 3171 Wangshouguan
- 3172 Hirst
- 3173 McNaught
- 3174 Alcock
- 3175 Netto
- 3176 Paolicchi
- 3177 Chillicothe
- 3178 Yoshitsune
- 3179 Beruti
- 3180 Morgan
- 3181 Ahnert
- 3182 Shimanto
- 3183 Franzkaiser
- 3184 Raab
- 3185 Clintford
- 3186 Manuilova
- 3187 Dalian
- 3188 Jekabsons
- 3189 Penza
- 3190 Aposhanskij
- 3191 Svanetia
- 3192 A'Hearn
- 3193 Elliot
- 3194 Dorsey
- 3195 Fedchenko
- 3196 Maklaj
- 3197 Weissman
- 3198 Wallonia
- 3199 Nefertiti
- 3200 Phaethon
- 3201 Sijthoff
- 3202 Graff
- 3203 Huth
- 3204 Lindgren
- 3205 Boksenberg
- 3206 Wuhan
- 3207 Spinrad
- 3208 Lunn
- 3209 Buchwald
- 3210 Lupishko
- 3211 Louispharailda
- 3212 Agricola
- 3213 Smolensk
- 3214 Makarenko
- 3215 Lapko
- 3216 Harrington
- 3217 Seidelmann
- 3218 Delphine
- 3219 Komaki
- 3220 Murayama
- 3221 Changshi
- 3222 Liller
- 3223 Forsius
- 3224 Irkutsk
- 3225 Hoag
- 3226 Plinius
- 3227 Hasegawa
- 3228 Pire
- 3229 Solnhofen
- 3230 Vampilov
- 3231 Mila
- 3232 Brest
- 3233 Krišbarons
- 3234 Hergiani
- 3235 Melchior
- 3236 Strand
- 3237 Victorplatt
- 3238 Timresovia
- 3239 Meizhou
- 3240 Laocoon
- 3241 Yeshuhua
- 3242 Bakhchisaraj
- 3243 Skytel
- 3244 Petronius
- 3245 Jensch
- 3246 Bidstrup
- 3247 Di Martino
- 3248 Farinella
- 3249 Musashino
- 3250 Martebo
- 3251 Eratosthenes
- 3252 Johnny
- 3253 Gradie
- 3254 Bus
- 3255 Tholen
- 3256 Daguerre
- 3257 Hanzlík
- 3258 Somnium
- 3259 Brownlee
- 3260 Vizbor
- 3261 Tvardovskij
- 3262 Miune
- 3263 Bligh
- 3264 Bounty
- 3265 Fletcher
- 3266 Bernardus
- 3267 Glo
- 3268 De Sanctis
- 3269 Vibert-Douglas
- 3270 Dudley
- 3271 Ul
- 3272 Tillandz
- 3273 Drukar
- 3274 Maillen
- 3275 Oberndorfer
- 3276 Porta Coeli
- 3277 Aaronson
- 3278 Běhounek
- 3279 Solon
- 3280 Grétry
- 3281 Maupertuis
- 3282 Spencer Jones
- 3283 Skorina
- 3284 Niebuhr
- 3285 Ruth Wolfe
- 3286 Anatoliya
- 3287 Olmstead
- 3288 Seleucus
- 3289 Mitani
- 3290 Azabu
- 3291 Dunlap
- 3292 Sather
- 3293 Rontaylor
- 3294 Carlvesely
- 3295 Murakami
- 3296 Bosque Alegre
- 3297 Hong Kong
- 3298 Massandra
- 3299 Hall
- 3300 McGlasson
- 3301 Jansje
- 3302 Schliemann
- 3303 Merta
- 3304 Pearce
- 3305 Ceadams
- 3306 Byron
- 3307 Athabasca
- 3308 Ferreri
- 3309 Brorfelde
- 3310 Patsy
- 3311 Podobed
- 3312 Pedersen
- 3313 Mendel
- 3314 Beals
- 3315 Chant
- 3316 Herzberg
- 3317 Paris
- 3318 Blixen
- 3319 Kibi
- 3320 Namba
- 3321 Dasha
- 3322 Lidiya
- 3323 Turgenev
- 3324 Avsyuk
- 3325 TARDIS
- 3326 Agafonikov
- 3327 Campins
- 3328 Interposita
- 3329 Golay
- 3330 Gantrisch
- 3331 Kvistaberg
- 3332 Raksha
- 3333 Schaber
- 3334 Somov
- 3335 Quanzhou
- 3336 Grygar
- 3337 Miloš
- 3338 Richter
- 3339 Treshnikov
- 3340 Yinhai
- 3341 Hartmann
- 3342 Fivesparks
- 3343 Nedzel
- 3344 Modena
- 3345 Tarkovskij
- 3346 Gerla
- 3347 Konstantin
- 3348 Pokryshkin
- 3349 Manas
- 3350 Scobee
- 3351 Smith
- 3352 McAuliffe
- 3353 Jarvis
- 3354 McNair
- 3355 Onizuka
- 3356 Resnik
- 3357 Tolstikov
- 3358 Anikushin
- 3359 Purcari
- 3360 Syrinx
- 3361 Orpheus
- 3362 Khufu
- 3363 Bowen
- 3364 Zdenka
- 3365 Recogne
- 3366 Gödel
- 3367 Alex
- 3368 Duncombe
- 3369 Freuchen
- 3370 Kohsai
- 3371 Giacconi
- 3372 Bratijchuk
- 3373 Koktebelia
- 3374 Namur
- 3375 Amy
- 3376 Armandhammer
- 3377 Lodewijk
- 3378 Susanvictoria
- 3379 Oishi
- 3380 Awaji
- 3381 Mikkola
- 3382 Cassidy
- 3383 Koyama
- 3384 Daliya
- 3385 Bronnina
- 3386 Klementinum
- 3387 Greenberg
- 3388 Tsanghinchi
- 3389 Sinzot
- 3390 Demanet
- 3391 Sinon
- 3392 Setouchi
- 3393 Štúr
- 3394 Banno
- 3395 Jitka
- 3396 Muazzez
- 3397 Leyla
- 3398 Stättmayer
- 3399 Kobzon
- 3400 Aotearoa
- 3401 Vanphilos
- 3402 Wisdom
- 3403 Tammy
- 3404 Hinderer
- 3405 Daiwensai
- 3406 Omsk
- 3407 Jimmysimms
- 3408 Shalamov
- 3409 Abramov
- 3410 Vereshchagin
- 3411 Debetencourt
- 3412 Kafka
- 3413 Andriana
- 3414 Champollion
- 3415 Danby
- 3416 Dorrit
- 3417 Tamblyn
- 3418 Izvekov
- 3419 Guth
- 3420 Standish
- 3421 Yangchenning
- 3422 Reid
- 3423 Slouka
- 3424 Nušl
- 3425 Hurukawa
- 3426 Seki
- 3427 Szentmártoni
- 3428 Roberts
- 3429 Chuvaev
- 3430 Bradfield
- 3431 Nakano
- 3432 Kobuchizawa
- 3433 Fehrenbach
- 3434 Hurless
- 3435 Boury
- 3436 Ibadinov
- 3437 Kapitsa
- 3438 Inarradas
- 3439 Lebofsky
- 3440 Stampfer
- 3441 Pochaina
- 3442 Yashin
- 3443 Leetsungdao
- 3444 Stepanian
- 3445 Pinson
- 3446 Combes
- 3447 Burckhalter
- 3448 Narbut
- 3449 Abell
- 3450 Dommanget
- 3451 Mentor
- 3452 Hawke
- 3453 Dostoevsky
- 3454 Lieske
- 3455 Kristensen
- 3456 Etiennemarey
- 3457 Arnenordheim
- 3458 Boduognat
- 3459 Bodil
- 3460 Ashkova
- 3461 Mandelshtam
- 3462 Zhouguangzhao
- 3463 Kaokuen
- 3464 Owensby
- 3465 Trevires
- 3466 Ritina
- 3467 Bernheim
- 3468 Urgenta
- 3469 Bulgakov
- 3470 Yaronika
- 3471 Amelin
- 3472 Upgren
- 3473 Sapporo
- 3474 Linsley
- 3475 Fichte
- 3476 Dongguan
- 3477 Kazbegi
- 3478 Fanale
- 3479 Malaparte
- 3480 Abante
- 3481 Xianglupeak
- 3482 Lesnaya
- 3483 Svetlov
- 3484 Neugebauer
- 3485 Barucci
- 3486 Fulchignoni
- 3487 Edgeworth
- 3488 Brahic
- 3489 Lottie
- 3490 Šolc
- 3491 Fridolin
- 3492 Petra-Pepi
- 3493 Stepanov
- 3494 Purple Mountain
- 3495 Colchagua
- 3496 Arieso
- 3497 Innanen
- 3498 Belton
- 3499 Hoppe
- 3500 Kobayashi
- 3501 Olegiya
- 3502 Huangpu
- 3503 Brandt
- 3504 Kholshevnikov
- 3505 Byrd
- 3506 French
- 3507 Vilas
- 3508 Pasternak
- 3509 Sanshui
- 3510 Veeder
- 3511 Tsvetaeva
- 3512 Eriepa
- 3513 Quqinyue
- 3514 Hooke
- 3515 Jindra
- 3516 Rusheva
- 3517 Tatianicheva
- 3518 Florena
- 3519 Ambiorix
- 3520 Klopsteg
- 3521 Comrie
- 3522 Becker
- 3523 Arina
- 3524 Schulz
- 3525 Paul
- 3526 Jeffbell
- 3527 McCord
- 3528 Counselman
- 3529 Dowling
- 3530 Hammel
- 3531 Cruikshank
- 3532 Tracie
- 3533 Toyota
- 3534 Sax
- 3535 Ditte
- 3536 Schleicher
- 3537 Jürgen
- 3538 Nelsonia
- 3539 Weimar
- 3540 Protesilaos
- 3541 Graham
- 3542 Tanjiazhen
- 3543 Ningbo
- 3544 Borodino
- 3545 Gaffey
- 3546 Atanasoff
- 3547 Serov
- 3548 Eurybates
- 3549 Hapke
- 3550 Link
- 3551 Verenia
- 3552 Don Quixote
- 3553 Mera
- 3554 Amun
- 3555 Miyasaka
- 3556 Lixiaohua
- 3557 Sokolsky
- 3558 Shishkin
- 3559 Violaumayer
- 3560 Chenqian
- 3561 Devine
- 3562 Ignatius
- 3563 Canterbury
- 3564 Talthybius
- 3565 Ojima
- 3566 Levitan
- 3567 Alvema
- 3568 ASCII
- 3569 Kumon
- 3570 Wuyeesun
- 3571 Milanštefánik
- 3572 Leogoldberg
- 3573 Holmberg
- 3574 Rudaux
- 3575 Anyuta
- 3576 Galina
- 3577 Putilin
- 3578 Carestia
- 3579 Rockholt
- 3580 Avery
- 3581 Alvarez
- 3582 Cyrano
- 3583 Burdett
- 3584 Aisha
- 3585 Goshirakawa
- 3586 Vasnetsov
- 3587 Descartes
- 3588 Kirik
- 3589 Loyola
- 3590 Holst
- 3591 Vladimirskij
- 3592 Nedbal
- 3593 Osip
- 3594 Scotti
- 3595 Gallagher
- 3596 Meriones
- 3597 Kakkuri
- 3598 Saucier
- 3599 Basov
- 3600 Archimedes
- 3601 Velikhov
- 3602 Lazzaro
- 3603 Gajdušek
- 3604 Berkhuijsen
- 3605 Davy
- 3606 Pohjola
- 3607 Naniwa
- 3608 Kataev
- 3609 Liloketai
- 3610 Decampos
- 3611 Dabu
- 3612 Peale
- 3613 Kunlun
- 3614 Tumilty
- 3615 Safronov
- 3616 Glazunov
- 3617 Eicher
- 3618 Kuprin
- 3619 Nash
- 3620 Platonov
- 3621 Curtis
- 3622 Ilinsky
- 3623 Chaplin
- 3624 Mironov
- 3625 Fracastoro
- 3626 Ohsaki
- 3627 Sayers
- 3628 Božněmcová
- 3629 Lebedinskij
- 3630 Lubomír
- 3631 Sigyn
- 3632 Grachevka
- 3633 Mira
- 3634 Iwan
- 3635 Kreutz
- 3636 Pajdušáková
- 3637 O'Meara
- 3638 Davis
- 3639 Weidenschilling
- 3640 Gostin
- 3641 Williams Bay
- 3642 Frieden
- 3643 Tienchanglin
- 3644 Kojitaku
- 3645 Fabini
- 3646 Aduatiques
- 3647 Dermott
- 3648 Raffinetti
- 3649 Guillermina
- 3650 Kunming
- 3651 Friedman
- 3652 Soros
- 3653 Klimishin
- 3654 AAS
- 3655 Eupraksia
- 3656 Hemingway
- 3657 Ermolova
- 3658 Feldman
- 3659 Bellingshausen
- 3660 Lazarev
- 3661 Dolmatovskij
- 3662 Dezhnev
- 3663 Tisserand
- 3664 Anneres
- 3665 Fitzgerald
- 3666 Holman
- 3667 Anne-Marie
- 3668 Ilfpetrov
- 3669 Vertinskij
- 3670 Northcott
- 3671 Dionysus
- 3672 Stevedberg
- 3673 Levy
- 3674 Erbisbühl
- 3675 Kemstach
- 3676 Hahn
- 3677 Magnusson
- 3678 Mongmanwai
- 3679 Condruses
- 3680 Sasha
- 3681 Boyan
- 3682 Welther
- 3683 Baumann
- 3684 Berry
- 3685 Derdenye
- 3686 Antoku
- 3687 Dzus
- 3688 Navajo
- 3689 Yeates
- 3690 Larson
- 3691 Bede
- 3692 Rickman
- 3693 Barringer
- 3694 Sharon
- 3695 Fiala
- 3696 Herald
- 3697 Guyhurst
- 3698 Manning
- 3699 Milbourn
- 3700 Geowilliams
- 3701 Purkyně
- 3702 Trubetskaya
- 3703 Volkonskaya
- 3704 Gaoshiqi
- 3705 Hotellasilla
- 3706 Sinnott
- 3707 Schröter
- 3708 Socus
- 3709 Polypoites
- 3710 Bogoslovskij
- 3711 Ellensburg
- 3712 Kraft
- 3713 Pieters
- 3714 Kenrussell
- 3715 Štohl
- 3716 Petzval
- 3717 Thorenia
- 3718 Dunbar
- 3719 Karamzin
- 3720 Hokkaido
- 3721 Widorn
- 3722 Urata
- 3723 Voznesenskij
- 3724 Annenskij
- 3725 Valsecchi
- 3726 Johnadams
- 3727 Maxhell
- 3728 IRAS
- 3729 Yangzhou
- 3730 Hurban
- 3731 Hancock
- 3732 Vávra
- 3733 Yoshitomo
- 3734 Waland
- 3735 Třeboň
- 3736 Rokoske
- 3737 Beckman
- 3738 Ots
- 3739 Rem
- 3740 Menge
- 3741 Rogerburns
- 3742 Sunshine
- 3743 Pauljaniczek
- 3744 Horn-d'Arturo
- 3745 Petaev
- 3746 Heyuan
- 3747 Belinskij
- 3748 Tatum
- 3749 Balam
- 3750 Ilizarov
- 3751 Kiang
- 3752 Camillo
- 3753 Cruithne
- 3754 Kathleen
- 3755 Lecointe
- 3756 Ruscannon
- 3757 Anagolay
- 3758 Karttunen
- 3759 Piironen
- 3760 Poutanen
- 3761 Romanskaya
- 3762 Amaravella
- 3763 Qianxuesen
- 3764 Holmesacourt
- 3765 Texereau
- 3766 Junepatterson
- 3767 DiMaggio
- 3768 Monroe
- 3769 Arthurmiller
- 3770 Nizami
- 3771 Alexejtolstoj
- 3772 Piaf
- 3773 Smithsonian
- 3774 Megumi
- 3775 Ellenbeth
- 3776 Vartiovuori
- 3777 McCauley
- 3778 Regge
- 3779 Kieffer
- 3780 Maury
- 3781 Dufek
- 3782 Celle
- 3783 Morris
- 3784 Chopin
- 3785 Kitami
- 3786 Yamada
- 3787 Aivazovskij
- 3788 Steyaert
- 3789 Zhongguo
- 3790 Raywilson
- 3791 Marci
- 3792 Preston
- 3793 Leonteus
- 3794 Sthenelos
- 3795 Nigel
- 3796 Lene
- 3797 Ching-Sung Yu
- 3798 de Jager
- 3799 Novgorod
- 3800 Karayusuf
- 3801 Thrasymedes
- 3802 Dornburg
- 3803 Tuchkova
- 3804 Drunina
- 3805 Goldreich
- 3806 Tremaine
- 3807 Pagels
- 3808 Tempel
- 3809 Amici
- 3810 Aoraki
- 3811 Karma
- 3812 Lidaksum
- 3813 Fortov
- 3814 Hoshi-no-mura
- 3815 König
- 3816 Chugainov
- 3817 Lencarter
- 3818 Gorlitsa
- 3819 Robinson
- 3820 Sauval
- 3821 Sonet
- 3822 Segovia
- 3823 Yorii
- 3824 Brendalee
- 3825 Nürnberg
- 3826 Handel
- 3827 Zdeněkhorský
- 3828 Hoshino
- 3829 Gunma
- 3830 Trelleborg
- 3831 Pettengill
- 3832 Shapiro
- 3833 Calingasta
- 3834 Zappafrank
- 3835 Korolenko
- 3836 Lem
- 3837 Carr
- 3838 Epona
- 3839 Bogaevskij
- 3840 Mimistrobell
- 3841 Dicicco
- 3842 Harlansmith
- 3843 OISCA
- 3844 Lujiaxi
- 3845 Neyachenko
- 3846 Hazel
- 3847 Šindel
- 3848 Analucia
- 3849 Incidentia
- 3850 Peltier
- 3851 Alhambra
- 3852 Glennford
- 3853 Haas
- 3854 George
- 3855 Pasasymphonia
- 3856 Lutskij
- 3857 Cellino
- 3858 Dorchester
- 3859 Börngen
- 3860 Plovdiv
- 3861 Lorenz
- 3862 Agekian
- 3863 Gilyarovskij
- 3864 Søren
- 3865 Lindbloom
- 3866 Langley
- 3867 Shiretoko
- 3868 Mendoza
- 3869 Norton
- 3870 Mayré
- 3871 Reiz
- 3872 Akirafujii
- 3873 Roddy
- 3874 Stuart
- 3875 Staehle
- 3876 Quaide
- 3877 Braes
- 3878 Jyoumon
- 3879 Machar
- 3880 Kaiserman
- 3881 Doumergua
- 3882 Johncox
- 3883 Verbano
- 3884 Alferov
- 3885 Bogorodskij
- 3886 Shcherbakovia
- 3887 Gerstner
- 3888 Hoyt
- 3889 Menshikov
- 3890 Bunin
- 3891 Werner
- 3892 Dezsö
- 3893 DeLaeter
- 3894 Williamcooke
- 3895 Earhart
- 3896 Pordenone
- 3897 Louhi
- 3898 Curlewis
- 3899 Wichterle
- 3900 Knežević
- 3901 Nanjingdaxue
- 3902 Yoritomo
- 3903 Kliment Ohridski
- 3904 Honda
- 3905 Doppler
- 3906 Chao
- 3907 Kilmartin
- 3908 Nyx
- 3909 Gladys
- 3910 Liszt
- 3911 Otomo
- 3912 Troja
- 3913 Chemin
- 3914 Kotogahama
- 3915 Fukushima
- 3916 Maeva
- 3917 Franz Schubert
- 3918 Brel
- 3919 Maryanning
- 3920 Aubignan
- 3921 Klementʹev
- 3922 Heather
- 3923 Radzievskij
- 3924 Birch
- 3925 Tretʹyakov
- 3926 Ramirez
- 3927 Feliciaplatt
- 3928 Randa
- 3929 Carmelmaria
- 3930 Vasilev
- 3931 Batten
- 3932 Edshay
- 3933 Portugal
- 3934 Tove
- 3935 Toatenmongakkai
- 3936 Elst
- 3937 Bretagnon
- 3938 Chapront
- 3939 Huruhata
- 3940 Larion
- 3941 Haydn
- 3942 Churivannia
- 3943 Silbermann
- 3944 Halliday
- 3945 Gerasimenko
- 3946 Shor
- 3947 Swedenborg
- 3948 Bohr
- 3949 Mach
- 3950 Yoshida
- 3951 Zichichi
- 3952 Russellmark
- 3953 Perth
- 3954 Mendelssohn
- 3955 Bruckner
- 3956 Caspar
- 3957 Sugie
- 3958 Komendantov
- 3959 Irwin
- 3960 Chaliubieju
- 3961 Arthurcox
- 3962 Valyaev
- 3963 Paradzhanov
- 3964 Danilevskij
- 3965 Konopleva
- 3966 Cherednichenko
- 3967 Shekhtelia
- 3968 Koptelov
- 3969 Rossi
- 3970 Herrán
- 3971 Voronikhin
- 3972 Richard
- 3973 Ogilvie
- 3974 Verveer
- 3975 Verdi
- 3976 Lise
- 3977 Maxine
- 3978 Klepešta
- 3979 Brorsen
- 3980 Hviezdoslav
- 3981 Stodola
- 3982 Kastelʹ
- 3983 Sakiko
- 3984 Chacos
- 3985 Raybatson
- 3986 Rozhkovskij
- 3987 Wujek
- 3988 Huma
- 3989 Odin
- 3990 Heimdal
- 3991 Basilevsky
- 3992 Wagner
- 3993 Šorm
- 3994 Ayashi
- 3995 Sakaino
- 3996 Fugaku
- 3997 Taga
- 3998 Tezuka
- 3999 Aristarchus
back to top

== See also ==
- List of minor planet discoverers
- List of observatory codes
- Meanings of minor planet names § Index
