= List of named minor planets: C =

This is a partial list of named minor planets, containing all those starting with the letter C, as of 9 November 2026. It is ordered in a case-insensitive, alphabetical manner and contains a total of 1,488 entries. Grey minor planets have no article and redirect to the list of minor planets instead (see List of minor planets § Main index).

== C ==
- 24044 Caballo
- 31431 Cabibbo
- 7317 Cabot
- 2997 Cabrera
- 353432 Cabrerabalears
- 320880 Cabu
- 39335 Caccin
- 9934 Caccioppoli
- 364577 Cachopito
- 161989 Cacus
- 31482 Caddell
- 200020 Cadi Ayyad
- 7092 Cadmus
- 34522 Cadores
- 297 Caecilia
- 57424 Caelumnoctu
- 18458 Caesar
- 6377 Cagney
- 11112 Cagnoli
- 21410 Cahill
- 952 Caia
- 13219 Cailletet
- 207681 Caiqiao
- 25456 Caitlinmann
- 17178 Caitlinrita
- 34405 Caitlinshearer
- 12359 Cajigal
- 10699 Calabrese
- 218636 Calabria
- 291855 Calabròcorrado
- 63463 Calamandrei
- 8967 Calandra
- 8269 Calandrelli
- 189202 Calar Alto
- 13126 Calbuco
- 199194 Calcatreppola
- 30449 Caldas
- 2926 Caldeira
- 72804 Caldentey
- 9478 Caldeyro
- 34233 Caldwell
- 28716 Calebgonser
- 25024 Calebmcgraw
- 12341 Calevoet
- 10803 Caléyo
- 96192 Calgary
- 341 California
- 42365 Caligiuri
- 3833 Calingasta
- 19738 Calinger
- 4742 Caliumi
- 19741 Callahan
- 22613 Callander
- 30452 Callegari
- 136803 Calliemorgan
- 12154 Callimachus
- 333001 Calloway
- 470600 Calogero
- 165694 Calosisbaragli
- 2542 Calpurnia
- 2906 Caltech
- 12183 Caltonen
- 1245 Calvinia
- 31276 Calvinrieder
- 26740 Camacho
- 18205 Camarca
- 11260 Camargo
- 5653 Camarillo
- 23779 Cambier
- 30453 Cambioni
- 2531 Cambridge
- 27465 Cambroziak
- 21921 Camdenmiller
- 11896 Camelbeeck
- 957 Camelia
- 9500 Camelot
- 30000 Camenzind
- 2980 Cameron
- 261107 Cameroncasimir
- 129988 Camerondickinson
- 28723 Cameronjones
- 291824 Cami
- 21438 Camibarnett
- 17959 Camierickson
- 107 Camilla
- 43305 Camillebibles
- 25593 Camillejordan
- 34172 Camillemiles
- 28048 Camilleyoke
- 3752 Camillo
- 11371 Camley
- 5160 Camoes
- 16879 Campai
- 378076 Campani
- 377 Campania
- 1077 Campanula
- 2751 Campbell
- 10075 Campeche
- 8776 Campestris
- 215970 Campidoglio
- 3327 Campins
- 13722 Campobagatin
- 344413 Campodeifiori
- 12696 Camus
- 11453 Cañada-Assandri
- 8123 Canaletto
- 47096 Canarias
- 175625 Canaryastroinst
- 5842 Cancelli
- 4899 Candace
- 333502 Candelaria
- 9010 Candelo
- 332530 Canders
- 3015 Candy
- 17305 Caniff
- 24409 Caninquinn
- 33402 Canizares
- 176711 Canmore
- 22512 Cannat
- 5216 Cannizzo
- 1120 Cannonia
- 22183 Canonlau
- 6256 Canova
- 740 Cantabia
- 34718 Cantagalli
- 3563 Canterbury
- 16246 Cantor
- 17836 Canup
- 34025 Caolannbrady
- 78249 Capaccioni
- 818660 Capar
- 14097 Capdepera
- 15825 Capecchi
- 231486 Capefearrock
- 1931 Čapek
- 11696 Capen
- 25907 Capodilupo
- 15249 Capodimonte
- 55428 Cappellaro
- 28860 Cappelletto
- 49777 Cappi
- 10928 Caprara
- 479 Caprera
- 90278 Caprese
- 189004 Capys
- 11083 Caracas
- 15553 Carachang
- 12557 Caracol
- 14571 Caralexander
- 11174 Carandrews
- 33200 Carasummit
- 12148 Caravaggio
- 18505 Caravelli
- 11373 Carbonaro
- 13158 Carcano
- 8262 Carcich
- 11437 Cardalda
- 11421 Cardano
- 164207 Cardea
- 110416 Cardille
- 325973 Cardinal
- 180643 Cardoen
- 20148 Carducci
- 30167 Caredmonds
- 1391 Carelia
- 3578 Carestia
- 128602 Careyparish
- 22692 Carfrekahl
- 27466 Cargibaysal
- 7680 Cari
- 491 Carina
- 133756 Carinajohnson
- 20138 Carinalee
- 78816 Caripito
- 1470 Carla
- 65785 Carlafracci
- 16397 Carlahayden
- 591592 Carlanderson
- 25403 Carlapiazza
- 132661 Carlbaeker
- 206015 Carlengelbrecht
- 5046 Carletonmoore
- 872236 Carlgrillmair
- 4121 Carlin
- 4362 Carlisle
- 117715 Carlkirby
- 39566 Carllewis
- 10095 Carlloewe
- 5598 Carlmurray
- 6058 Carlnielsen
- 545571 Carlobaccigalupi
- 101534 Carlobenna
- 78535 Carloconti
- 306386 Carlofavetti
- 325476 Carlomarchioro
- 12339 Carloo
- 202819 Carlosánchez
- 462078 Carlosbriones
- 43722 Carloseduardo
- 100050 Carloshernandez
- 118768 Carlosnoriega
- 2858 Carlosporter
- 1769 Carlostorres
- 33290 Carloszuluaga
- 360 Carlova
- 7911 Carlpilcher
- 34053 Carlquines
- 17184 Carlrogers
- 5890 Carlsberg
- 12356 Carlscheele
- 21647 Carlturner
- 3294 Carlvesely
- 26074 Carlwirtz
- 31972 Carlycrump
- 167971 Carlyhowett
- 20632 Carlyrosser
- 10307 Carlschmidt
- 212073 Carlzimmer
- 16106 Carmagnola
- 26255 Carmarques
- 48416 Carmelita
- 3929 Carmelmaria
- 5766 Carmelofalco
- 558 Carmen
- 315577 Carmenchu
- 73539 Carmenperrella
- 101101 Carmichael
- 20251 Carminegiordano
- 6605 Carmontelle
- 224592 Carnac
- 671 Carnegia
- 6016 Carnelli
- 39653 Carnera
- 12289 Carnot
- 11690 Carodulaney
- 2214 Carol
- 10974 Carolalbert
- 17789 Carolcarty
- 8078 Carolejordan
- 246345 Carolharris
- 16078 Carolhersh
- 5531 Carolientje
- 235 Carolina
- 12239 Carolinakou
- 172526 Carolinegarcia
- 25822 Carolinejune
- 21549 Carolinelang
- 12074 Carolinelau
- 7635 Carolinesmith
- 46991 Carolinesoubiran
- 28738 Carolinolan
- 431397 Carolinregina
- 282630 Caroljones
- 31092 Carolowilhelmina
- 157421 Carolpercy
- 10724 Carolraymond
- 23013 Carolsmyth
- 22947 Carolsuh
- 19821 Caroltolin
- 16951 Carolus Quartus
- 4446 Carolyn
- 9171 Carolyndiane
- 379470 Carolynjones
- 27438 Carolynjons
- 26397 Carolynsinow
- 102216 Carona
- 21583 Caropietsch
- 128166 Carora
- 30353 Carothers
- 44711 Carp
- 318682 Carpaccio
- 1852 Carpenter
- 66207 Carpi
- 575195 Carpineti
- 8106 Carpino
- 3837 Carr
- 31919 Carragher
- 214928 Carrara
- 4171 Carrasco
- 658642 Carreira
- 3050 Carrera
- 7324 Carret
- 31737 Carriecoombs
- 20267 Carrieholt
- 16125 Carriehsu
- 28081 Carriehudson
- 18788 Carriemiller
- 6534 Carriepeterson
- 347266 Carrière
- 21746 Carrieshaw
- 30454 Carrillosánchez
- 11800 Carrozzo
- 175365 Carsac
- 13333 Carsenty
- 6572 Carson
- 21361 Carsonmark
- 17917 Cartan
- 623031 Cartaya
- 10683 Carter
- 30201 Caruana
- 4700 Carusi
- 7042 Carver
- 148342 Carverbierson
- 9342 Carygrant
- 10003 Caryhuang
- 32424 Caryjames
- 100308 ČAS
- 42776 Casablanca
- 4814 Casacci
- 7356 Casagrande
- 39549 Casals
- 7328 Casanova
- 620307 Casanovas
- 6364 Casarini
- 168358 Casca
- 6848 Casely-Hayford
- 21504 Caseyfreeman
- 18681 Caseylipp
- 12226 Caseylisse
- 21700 Caseynicole
- 18564 Caseyo
- 16021 Caseyvaughn
- 32562 Caseywarner
- 635483 Casimir
- 26986 Čáslavská
- 5387 Casleo
- 3956 Caspar
- 9474 Cassadrury
- 199261 Cassandralejoly
- 33442 Cassandrarunyon
- 6936 Cassatt
- 44110 Cassegrain
- 20112 Cassia
- 3382 Cassidy
- 32073 Cassidyryan
- 24101 Cassini
- 1683 Castafiore
- 17041 Castagna
- 4769 Castalia
- 142755 Castander
- 43087 Castegna
- 90718 Castel Gandolfo
- 5802 Casteldelpiano
- 283057 Casteldipiazza
- 78661 Castelfranco
- 9956 Castellaz
- 72037 Castelldefels
- 6857 Castelli
- 9630 Castellion
- 88146 Castello
- 210245 Castets
- 15594 Castillo
- 11274 Castillo-Rogez
- 400193 Castión
- 15011 Castro-Tirado
- 7132 Casulli
- 13178 Catalan
- 83360 Catalina
- 13868 Catalonia
- 11413 Catanach
- 269245 Catastini
- 9922 Catcheller
- 181872 Cathaysa
- 28169 Cathconte
- 215016 Catherinegriffin
- 129980 Catherinejohnson
- 30259 Catherineli
- 33441 Catherineprato
- 50728 Catherinestevens
- 32264 Cathjesslai
- 87644 Cathomen
- 23867 Cathsoto
- 6493 Cathybennett
- 22143 Cathyfowler
- 28640 Cathywong
- 27505 Catieblazek
- 129773 Catmerrill
- 129071 Catriegle
- 1116 Catriona
- 11965 Catullus
- 1344 Caubeta
- 16249 Cauchy
- 31483 Caulfield
- 1974 Caupolican
- 8687 Caussols
- 505 Cava
- 9811 Cavadore
- 10149 Cavagna
- 5184 Cavaillé-Coll
- 9392 Cavaillon
- 18059 Cavalieri
- 228078 Cavalloni
- 8987 Cavancuddy
- 8945 Cavaradossi
- 331316 Cavedon
- 20053 Cavefish
- 11073 Cavell
- 12727 Cavendish
- 10591 Caverni
- 13145 Cavezzo
- 16755 Cayley
- 23192 Caysvesterby
- 24354 Caz
- 15000 CCD
- 3305 Ceadams
- 2363 Cebriones
- 10931 Ceccano
- 13798 Cecchini
- 27900 Cecconi
- 7739 Čech
- 4058 Cecilgreen
- 526460 Ceciliakoocen
- 8261 Ceciliejulie
- 605911 Cecily
- 20269 Cecilysunday
- 8657 Cedrus
- 27618 Ceilierin
- 25706 Cekoscielski
- 8856 Celastrus
- 20572 Celemorrow
- 6697 Celentano
- 299792 Celeritas
- 17503 Celestechild
- 1252 Celestia
- 5212 Celiacruz
- 158657 Célian
- 23284 Celik
- 66144 Célinereylé
- 20479 Celisaucier
- 12618 Cellarius
- 3782 Celle
- 117539 Celletti
- 26578 Cellinekim
- 3857 Cellino
- 85511 Celnik
- 4169 Celsius
- 8411 Celso
- 186 Celuta
- 13223 Cenaceneri
- 1240 Centenaria
- 513 Centesima
- 113626 Centorenazzo
- 32596 Čepek
- 2198 Ceplecha
- 133528 Ceragioli
- 807 Ceraskia
- 1865 Cerberus
- 8857 Cercidiphyllum
- 484613 Cerebrito
- 1 Ceres
- 2252 CERGA
- 15332 CERN
- 12790 Cernan
- 138979 Černice
- 29692 Černis
- 26195 Černohlávek
- 5268 Černohorský
- 6802 Černovice
- 481984 Cernunnos
- 7593 Cernuschi
- 43881 Cerreto
- 31028 Cerulli
- 79144 Cervantes
- 32911 Cervara
- 26897 Červená
- 100049 Césarann
- 6982 Cesarchavez
- 13992 Cesarebarbieri
- 57879 Cesarechiosi
- 70210 Cesarelombardi
- 304813 Cesarina
- 395141 Césarmanrique
- 161278 Cesarmendoza
- 18498 Cesaro
- 1571 Cesco
- 8112 Cesi
- 11101 Českáfilharmonie
- 11134 České Budějovice
- 2747 Český Krumlov
- 28542 Cespedes-Nano
- 248321 Cester
- 2089 Cetacea
- 65489 Ceto
- 12579 Ceva
- 31641 Cevasco
- 86043 Cévennes
- 1333 Cevenola
- 6069 Cevolani
- 34090 Cewhang
- 6674 Cézanne
- 12675 Chabot
- 1622 Chacornac
- 3984 Chacos
- 27386 Chadcampbell
- 28182 Chadharris
- 2981 Chagall
- 9483 Chagas
- 4103 Chahine
- 25560 Chaihaoxi
- 1671 Chaika
- 12539 Chaikin
- 34016 Chaitanya
- 90713 Chajnantor
- 1246 Chaka
- 10592 Chakrabarty
- 28866 Chakraborty
- 313 Chaldaea
- 2562 Chaliapin
- 3960 Chaliubieju
- 2040 Chalonge
- 275962 Chalverat
- 9250 Chamberlin
- 3035 Chambers
- 23707 Chambliss
- 24711 Chamisso
- 18634 Champigneulles
- 8732 Champion
- 3414 Champollion
- 5671 Chanal
- 20476 Chanarich
- 59369 Chanco
- 43500 Chandler
- 1958 Chandra
- 2051 Chang
- 115015 Chang Díaz
- 4047 Chang'E
- 7485 Changchun
- 27966 Changguang
- 316450 Changhsiangtung
- 336392 Changhua
- 5384 Changjiangcun
- 347336 Changmeemann
- 33514 Changpeihsuan
- 172315 Changqiaoxiaoxue
- 43597 Changshaopo
- 3221 Changshi
- 20150 Changshuhong
- 300854 Changyuin
- 448988 Changzhong
- 10679 Chankaochang
- 28692 Chanleysmall
- 20760 Chanmatchun
- 16107 Chanmugam
- 3315 Chant
- 31298 Chantaihei
- 1707 Chantal
- 289587 Chantdugros
- 8126 Chanwainam
- 20780 Chanyikhei
- 3906 Chao
- 4566 Chaokuangpiu
- 4630 Chaonis
- 19521 Chaos
- 21436 Chaoyichi
- 5217 Chaozhou
- 11831 Chaple
- 3623 Chaplin
- 4032 Chaplygin
- 2409 Chapman
- 16238 Chappe
- 3938 Chapront
- 21128 Chapuis
- 714378 Char
- 269243 Charbonnel
- 24268 Charconley
- 11314 Charcot
- 236746 Chareslindos
- 10199 Chariklo
- 627 Charis
- 207547 Charito
- 33197 Charlallen
- 5878 Charlene
- 17428 Charleroi
- 5202 Charleseliot
- 34133 Charlesfenske
- 15969 Charlesgreen
- 30277 Charlesgulian
- 30035 Charlesliu
- 16275 Charlesma
- 25915 Charlesmcguire
- 32058 Charlesnoyes
- 29613 Charlespicard
- 25944 Charlesross
- 58606 Charlestrenet
- 32222 Charlesvest
- 26412 Charlesyu
- 13933 Charleville
- 34240 Charleyhutch
- 28653 Charliebrucker
- 129102 Charliecamarotte
- 26382 Charlieduke
- 4479 Charlieparker
- 8677 Charlier
- 10426 Charlierouse
- 24538 Charliexie
- 1510 Charlois
- 543 Charlotte
- 20273 Charlottebays
- 39427 Charlottebrontë
- 826930 Charlottesmall
- 10642 Charmaine
- 20335 Charmartell
- 6829 Charmawidor
- 16070 Charops
- 9445 Charpentier
- 33536 Charpugdee
- 19531 Charton
- 388 Charybdis
- 26252 Chase
- 28136 Chasegross
- 27602 Chaselewis
- 18510 Chasles
- 26194 Chasolivier
- 15037 Chassagne
- 331992 Chasseral
- 490628 Chassigny
- 301622 Chastel
- 13087 Chastellux
- 28209 Chatterjee
- 33353 Chattopadhyay
- 28869 Chaubal
- 2984 Chaucer
- 20264 Chauhan
- 12281 Chaumont
- 7048 Chaussidon
- 301522 Chaykin
- 37645 Chebarkul
- 1804 Chebotarev
- 2010 Chebyshev
- 22158 Chee
- 445156 Cheeloomed
- 223263 Cheikhoumardia
- 2369 Chekhov
- 363623 Chelčický
- 24863 Cheli
- 8608 Chelomey
- 21612 Chelsagloria
- 156751 Chelseaferrell
- 25425 Chelsealynn
- 27258 Chelseavoss
- 35427 Chelseawang
- 21088 Chelyabinsk
- 3913 Chemin
- 21510 Chemnitz
- 30270 Chemparathy
- 2963 Chen Jiageng
- 465513 Chenchen
- 661666 Chenchengpo
- 236851 Chenchikwan
- 19872 Chendonghua
- 10929 Chenfangyun
- 168126 Chengbruce
- 26559 Chengcheng
- 590888 Chengda
- 2743 Chengdu
- 175452 Chenggong
- 28277 Chengherngyi
- 26396 Chengjingjie
- 47005 Chengmaolan
- 555802 Chengyen
- 20879 Chengyuhsuan
- 28155 Chengzhendai
- 15554 Chenhuaipu
- 23279 Chenhungjen
- 12701 Chénier
- 33000 Chenjiansheng
- 7681 Chenjingrun
- 151362 Chenkegong
- 299020 Chennaoui
- 3560 Chenqian
- 278986 Chenshuchu
- 807098 Chensong
- 25039 Chensun
- 19873 Chentao
- 21645 Chentsaiwei
- 562237 Chentsov
- 31909 Chenweitung
- 31336 Chenyuhsin
- 21718 Cheonghapark
- 4412 Chephren
- 7727 Chepurova
- 3966 Cherednichenko
- 4307 Cherepashchuk
- 5483 Cherkashin
- 4053 Cherkasov
- 25414 Cherkassky
- 29552 Chern
- 10005 Chernega
- 30821 Chernetenko
- 21454 Chernoby
- 4207 Chernova
- 24968 Chernyakhovsky
- 2325 Chernykh
- 2783 Chernyshevskij
- 77185 Cherryh
- 12126 Chersidamas
- 2701 Cherson
- 6358 Chertok
- 568 Cheruskia
- 199986 Chervone
- 215685 Cherylalexander
- 8247 Cherylhall
- 411717 Cherylreed
- 6042 Cheshirecat
- 12104 Chesley
- 6065 Chesneau
- 24484 Chester
- 15673 Chetaev
- 21563 Chetgervais
- 55383 Cheungkwokwing
- 361193 Cheungtaklung
- 27387 Chhabra
- 20145 Chiachiaolin
- 8397 Chiakitanaka
- 25606 Chiangshenghao
- 6851 Chianti
- 4398 Chiara
- 29869 Chiarabarbara
- 21511 Chiardola
- 10376 Chiarini
- 147918 Chiayi
- 20613 Chibaken
- 5917 Chibasai
- 334 Chicago
- 100456 Chichén Itzá
- 6991 Chichibu
- 47162 Chicomendez
- 343441 Chienchenglin
- 484734 Chienshu
- 114829 Chierchia
- 7268 Chigorin
- 16232 Chijagerbs
- 4577 Chikako
- 14004 Chikama
- 23254 Chikatoshi
- 19160 Chikayoshitomi
- 23478 Chikumagawa
- 9153 Chikurinji
- 6237 Chikushi
- 4580 Child
- 30117 Childress
- 4636 Chile
- 3177 Chillicothe
- 2221 Chilton
- 623 Chimaera
- 1633 Chimay
- 30797 Chimborazo
- 5557 Chimikeppuko
- 24939 Chiminello
- 532037 Chiminigagua
- 1125 China
- 19303 Chinacyo
- 21464 Chinaroonchai
- 9365 Chinesewilson
- 3797 Ching-Sung Yu
- 21827 Chingzhu
- 4429 Chinmoy
- 1787 Chiny
- 30514 Chiomento
- 6261 Chione
- 79472 Chiorny
- 281068 Chipolin
- 10635 Chiragkumar
- 19004 Chirayath
- 13214 Chirikov
- 34545 Chirita
- 6981 Chirman
- 2060 Chiron
- 9090 Chirotenmondai
- 289314 Chisholm
- 142756 Chiu
- 2977 Chivilikhin
- 5686 Chiyonoura
- 3113 Chizhevskij
- 33522 Chizumimaeta
- 2692 Chkalov
- 5053 Chladni
- 29750 Chleborad
- 402 Chloë
- 28457 Chloeanassis
- 129216 Chloecastle
- 31599 Chloesherry
- 410 Chloris
- 938 Chlosinde
- 5844 Chlupáč
- 6474 Choate
- 5553 Chodas
- 63145 Choemuseon
- 25104 Chohyunghoon
- 22171 Choi
- 26458 Choihyuna
- 5389 Choikaiyau
- 23732 Choiseungjae
- 236170 Cholnoky
- 3011 Chongqing
- 25662 Chonofsky
- 3784 Chopin
- 47018 Chopinet
- 535266 Chorzów
- 8577 Choseikomori
- 10491 Chou
- 257248 Chouchiehlun
- 177967 Chouchihkang
- 9110 Choukai
- 4976 Choukyongchol
- 34470 Chouruihua
- 7403 Choustník
- 34081 Chowkitmun
- 71461 Chowmeeyee
- 28980 Chowyunfat
- 30161 Chrepta
- 341958 Chrétien
- 6014 Chribrenmark
- 12093 Chrimatthews
- 333171 Chris
- 25793 Chrisanchez
- 14807 Chrisanders
- 25309 Chrisauer
- 214475 Chrisbayus
- 29827 Chrisbennett
- 8819 Chrisbondi
- 12665 Chriscarson
- 6723 Chrisclark
- 12989 Chriseanderson
- 21528 Chrisfaust
- 15851 Chrisfleming
- 257430 Chrisgelino
- 29722 Chrisgraham
- 20275 Chrishamann
- 22848 Chrisharriot
- 370068 Chrisholmberg
- 30767 Chriskraft
- 17908 Chriskuyu
- 121506 Chrislorentson
- 209149 Chrismackenzie
- 129051 Chrismay
- 128417 Chrismccaa
- 21562 Chrismessick
- 52649 Chrismith
- 9709 Chrisnell
- 28353 Chrisnielsen
- 560354 Chrisnolan
- 24219 Chrisodom
- 4892 Chrispollas
- 21459 Chrisrussell
- 134044 Chrisshinohara
- 27353 Chrisspenner
- 90125 Chrissquire
- 1015 Christa
- 2695 Christabel
- 18653 Christagünt
- 11823 Christen
- 192158 Christian
- 231555 Christianeurda
- 39814 Christianlegrand
- 8313 Christiansen
- 255308 Christianzuber
- 69460 Christibarnard
- 30154 Christichil
- 13280 Christihaas
- 20379 Christijohns
- 25376 Christikeen
- 151835 Christinarichey
- 628 Christine
- 34316 Christineleo
- 21556 Christineli
- 33598 Christineliu
- 25014 Christinepalau
- 33492 Christirogers
- 18548 Christoffel
- 25049 Christofnorn
- 121016 Christopharnold
- 61850 Christophbrunner
- 1698 Christophe
- 17246 Christophedumas
- 211613 Christophelovis
- 28799 Christopherford
- 30100 Christophergo
- 202750 Christophertonge
- 668527 Christophgerhard
- 5364 Christophschäfer
- 21587 Christopynn
- 28632 Christraver
- 129564 Christy
- 2834 Christy Carol
- 33907 Christykrenek
- 8792 Christyljohnson
- 129125 Chrisvoth
- 24259 Chriswalker
- 29972 Chriswan
- 128439 Chriswaters
- 32726 Chromios
- 683868 Chrupała
- 202 Chryseïs
- 637 Chrysothemis
- 20276 Chrystianpereira
- 9222 Chubey
- 18735 Chubko
- 42522 Chuckberry
- 37154 Chuckfeeney
- 70710 Chuckfellows
- 11356 Chuckjones
- 8629 Chucklorre
- 128608 Chucklove
- 129881 Chucksee
- 169078 Chuckshaw
- 363115 Chuckwood
- 16425 Chuckyeager
- 241538 Chudniv
- 3816 Chugainov
- 333241 Chugg
- 11417 Chughtai
- 129561 Chuhachi
- 11793 Chujkovia
- 3094 Chukokkala
- 2509 Chukotka
- 5465 Chumakov
- 650474 Chungchaocheng
- 34779 Chungchiyung
- 37687 Chunghikoh
- 597148 Chungmingshan
- 187636 Chungyuan
- 24133 Chunkaikao
- 269550 Chur
- 6646 Churanta
- 10343 Church
- 11626 Church Stretton
- 37561 Churgym
- 25095 Churinov
- 3942 Churivannia
- 336177 Churri
- 2627 Churyumov
- 12141 Chushayashi
- 4988 Chushuho
- 3429 Chuvaev
- 2670 Chuvashia
- 300634 Chuwenshin
- 38962 Chuwinghung
- 100675 Chuyanakahara
- 461981 Chuyouhua
- 60423 Chvojen
- 22940 Chyan
- 25416 Chyanwen
- 7923 Chyba
- 43954 Chýnov
- 27184 Ciabattari
- 29705 Cialucy
- 24087 Ciambetti
- 19464 Ciarabarr
- 26312 Ciardi
- 8193 Ciaurro
- 14155 Cibronen
- 78124 Cicalò
- 34760 Ciccone
- 25367 Cicek
- 9446 Cicero
- 18845 Cichocki
- 8601 Ciconia
- 7192 Cieletespace
- 13777 Cielobuio
- 192439 Cílek
- 8744 Cilla
- 43511 Cima Ekar
- 221769 Cima Rest
- 11578 Cimabue
- 1275 Cimbria
- 215841 Čimelice
- 1307 Cimmeria
- 1373 Cincinnati
- 2298 Cindijon
- 34393 Cindyallen
- 221149 Cindyfoote
- 18947 Cindyfulton
- 7605 Cindygraber
- 29612 Cindyjiang
- 8613 Cindyschulz
- 3138 Ciney
- 36446 Cinodapistoia
- 273994 Cinqueterre
- 22149 Cinyras
- 627030 Ciobanu
- 21799 Ciociaria
- 13848 Cioffi
- 12812 Cioni
- 363124 Ciottolimeco
- 11600 Cipolla
- 34 Circe
- 86195 Cireglio
- 720549 Cırık
- 11158 Cirou
- 750594 Cîrstea
- 10861 Ciske
- 4643 Cisneros
- 6799 Citfiftythree
- 6035 Citlaltépetl
- 8965 Citrinella
- 16068 Citron
- 16368 Città di Alba
- 18441 Cittàdivinci
- 2420 Čiurlionis
- 156990 Claerbout
- 9592 Clairaut
- 36444 Clairblackburn
- 15967 Clairearmstrong
- 32163 Claireburch
- 8979 Clanga
- 31110 Clapas
- 59793 Clapiès
- 4305 Clapton
- 642 Clara
- 95955 Claragianni
- 555227 Claraisabella
- 34080 Clarakeng
- 24923 Claralouisa
- 34188 Clarawagner
- 44206 Clareschneider
- 32315 Clarezhu
- 302 Clarissa
- 27105 Clarkben
- 4923 Clarke
- 52057 Clarkhowell
- 5243 Clasien
- 73984 Claudebernard
- 130071 Claudebrunet
- 12996 Claudedomingue
- 91553 Claudedoom
- 65864 Claudepieplu
- 311 Claudia
- 59067 Claudiaangeli
- 35325 Claudiaguarnieri
- 29609 Claudiahuang
- 333076 Claudiamanzoni
- 315529 Claudinefrieden
- 11575 Claudio
- 11264 Claudiomaccone
- 7117 Claudius
- 5658 Clausbaader
- 12873 Clausewitz
- 29246 Clausius
- 91604 Clausmadsen
- 131764 Clauteodorescu
- 2461 Clavel
- 20237 Clavius
- 8452 Clay
- 4564 Clayton
- 3118 Claytonsmith
- 211379 Claytonwhitted
- 100641 Cledassou
- 1101 Clematis
- 1919 Clemence
- 13993 Clemenssimmer
- 109330 Clemente
- 35534 Clementfeller
- 252 Clementina
- 20277 Clementlee
- 26329 Cleoabram
- 4503 Cleobulus
- 14411 Clérambault
- 25905 Clerico
- 9583 Clerke
- 385695 Clete
- 6296 Cleveland
- 43843 Cleynaerts
- 4276 Clifford
- 24134 Cliffordkim
- 228883 Cliffsimak
- 3034 Climenhaga
- 16150 Clinch
- 1982 Cline
- 33747 Clingan
- 124845 Clinteastwood
- 3185 Clintford
- 11592 Clintkelly
- 935 Clivia
- 5511 Cloanthus
- 14539 Clocke Roeland
- 661 Cloelia
- 282 Clorinde
- 54902 Close
- 200025 Cloud Gate
- 48960 Clouet
- 27524 Clousing
- 253587 Cloutier
- 6081 Cloutis
- 15499 Cloyd
- 6523 Clube
- 229631 Cluny
- 9364 Clusius
- 356217 Clymene
- 33455 Coakley
- 9997 COBE
- 12376 Cochabamba
- 295473 Cochard
- 224888 Cochingchu
- 4551 Cochran
- 6436 Coco
- 2939 Coconino
- 450931 Coculescu
- 17179 Codina
- 9015 Coe
- 237 Coelestina
- 12355 Coelho
- 15388 Coelum
- 216591 Coetzee
- 23788 Cofer
- 227147 Coggiajérôme
- 6713 Coggie
- 1764 Cogshall
- 32202 Cogswell
- 23735 Cohen
- 972 Cohnia
- 247821 Coignet
- 106545 Colanduno
- 9553 Colas
- 20280 Colazo
- 28147 Colbath
- 9164 Colbert
- 32214 Colburn
- 5569 Colby
- 121330 Colbygoodloe
- 3495 Colchagua
- 1135 Colchis
- 5635 Cole
- 27440 Colekendrick
- 11821 Coleman
- 8147 Colemanhawkins
- 224067 Colemila
- 72949 Colesanti
- 22065 Colgrove
- 391496 Colineldridge
- 15347 Colinstuart
- 10096 Colleenohare
- 19547 Collier
- 19411 Collinarnold
- 142757 Collinge
- 6471 Collins
- 8963 Collurio
- 1973 Colocolo
- 18149 Colombatti
- 7030 Colombini
- 634659 Colombo
- 607372 Colombounilanka
- 243440 Colonia
- 5042 Colpa
- 5893 Coltrane
- 10677 Colucci
- 170906 Coluche
- 327 Columbia
- 8434 Columbianus
- 79847 Colzani
- 489 Comacina
- 1655 Comas Solà
- 7636 Comba
- 9152 Combe
- 3446 Combes
- 15843 Comcom
- 5791 Comello
- 10207 Comeniana
- 48268 Comitini
- 13770 Commerson
- 826856 Commodorecochran
- 8767 Commontern
- 25316 Comnick
- 8990 Compassion
- 884759 Compostela
- 52337 Compton
- 3521 Comrie
- 25919 Comuniello
- 7213 Conae
- 7016 Conandoyle
- 24334 Conard
- 6671 Concari
- 709193 Concettafinardi
- 58 Concordia
- 9389 Condillac
- 7960 Condorcet
- 3679 Condruses
- 12932 Conedera
- 30288 Conelalexander
- 542888 Confino
- 7853 Confucius
- 31570 Conjat
- 14582 Conlin
- 4816 Connelly
- 29292 Conniewalker
- 142758 Connolly
- 23811 Connorivens
- 15139 Connormcarty
- 13700 Connors
- 12153 Conon
- 33970 Conorbenson
- 129026 Conormcmenamin
- 767828 Conovici
- 1528 Conrada
- 13024 Conradferdinand
- 5032 Conradhirsh
- 7777 Consadole
- 12524 Conscience
- 4597 Consolmagno
- 8237 Constable
- 117852 Constance
- 315 Constantia
- 690780 Constantinescu
- 195191 Constantinetsang
- 25961 Conti
- 7477 Conversiluca
- 614690 Conversimarcello
- 128925 Conwell
- 3061 Cook
- 2618 Coonabarabran
- 35365 Cooney
- 124852 Cooper
- 13586 Copenhagen
- 19137 Copiapó
- 95962 Copito
- 4532 Copland
- 815 Coppelia
- 172850 Coppens
- 1322 Coppernicus
- 25417 Coquillette
- 55737 Coquimbo
- 504 Cora
- 4598 Coradini
- 128314 Coraliejackman
- 72632 Coralina
- 8964 Corax
- 119248 Corbally
- 2442 Corbett
- 627520 Corbey
- 4008 Corbin
- 2758 Cordelia
- 92685 Cordellorenz
- 2942 Cordie
- 365 Corduba
- 21425 Cordwell
- 79900 Coreglia
- 20295 Corgne
- 6175 Cori
- 16564 Coriolis
- 129954 Corksauve
- 34024 Cormaclarkin
- 34126 Cornaa
- 8447 Cornejo
- 425 Cornelia
- 26011 Cornelius
- 8250 Cornell
- 8826 Corneville
- 34419 Corning
- 8858 Cornus
- 13273 Cornwell
- 6672 Corot
- 773258 Corpodean
- 175046 Corporon
- 75225 Corradoaugias
- 6206 Corradolamberti
- 59483 Corranplain
- 10460 Correa-Otto
- 13917 Correggia
- 9924 Corrigan
- 429136 Corsali
- 272209 Corsica
- 343230 Corsini
- 91428 Cortesi
- 50240 Cortina
- 27776 Cortland
- 297026 Corton
- 1232 Cortusa
- 8515 Corvan
- 1442 Corvina
- 296462 Corylachlan
- 233488 Cosandey
- 915 Cosette
- 662607 Cosialls
- 2129 Cosicosi
- 644 Cosima
- 43923 Cosimonoccioli
- 353171 Cosmebauçà
- 45027 Cosquer
- 4993 Cossard
- 730495 Costafrancini
- 397800 Costaillobera
- 17024 Costello
- 10445 Coster
- 20140 Costitx
- 37596 Cotahuasi
- 9461 Cotingkeh
- 26027 Cotopaxi
- 273262 Cottam
- 11456 Cotto-Figueroa
- 2026 Cottrell
- 9633 Cotur
- 2190 Coubertin
- 9071 Coudenberghe
- 27712 Coudray
- 12237 Coughlin
- 30826 Coulomb
- 18776 Coulter
- 3528 Counselman
- 35394 Countbasie
- 6798 Couperin
- 18555 Courant
- 8238 Courbet
- 184508 Courroux
- 63129 Courtemanche
- 30162 Courtney
- 333043 Courtneymario
- 18101 Coustenis
- 4909 Couteau
- 5439 Couturier
- 95959 Covadonga
- 3009 Coventry
- 142759 Covey
- 185576 Covichi
- 5424 Covington
- 1898 Cowell
- 13843 Cowenbrown
- 24308 Cowenco
- 11304 Cowra
- 1476 Cox
- 18560 Coxeter
- 14429 Coyne
- 9839 Crabbegat
- 7763 Crabeels
- 4137 Crabtree
- 333184 Craft
- 5068 Cragg
- 8138 Craigbowers
- 23042 Craigpeters
- 126901 Craigstevens
- 18192 Craigwallace
- 576465 Craigwoodhams
- 32090 Craigworley
- 18157 Craigwright
- 557396 Crailsheim
- 246238 Crampton
- 8284 Cranach
- 73517 Cranbrook
- 8761 Crane
- 83982 Crantor
- 1725 CrAO
- 7327 Crawford
- 207321 Crawshaw
- 21423 Credo
- 19398 Creedence
- 10046 Creighton
- 14062 Cremaschini
- 486 Cremona
- 660 Crescentia
- 102619 Crespino
- 4373 Crespo
- 96747 Crespodasilva
- 304788 Cresques
- 8760 Crex
- 12845 Crick
- 57567 Crikey
- 1140 Crimea
- 28443 Crisara
- 9463 Criscione
- 127545 Crisman
- 2757 Crisser
- 8775 Cristata
- 456627 Cristianmartins
- 20297 Cristianomat
- 26478 Cristianrosu
- 659267 Cristianstancu
- 64840 Cristinapauselli
- 8063 Cristinathomas
- 29348 Criswick
- 20690 Crivello
- 589 Croatia
- 10606 Crocco
- 1220 Crocus
- 12282 Crombecq
- 85004 Crombie
- 10283 Cromer
- 1899 Crommelin
- 11423 Cronin
- 6318 Cronkite
- 2825 Crosby
- 321485 Cross
- 32593 Crotty
- 18973 Crouch
- 33696 Crouchley
- 4052 Crovisier
- 28794 Crowley
- 14282 Cruijff
- 3531 Cruikshank
- 28245 Cruise
- 3753 Cruithne
- 29298 Cruls
- 12992 Crumpler
- 32150 Crumpton
- 9679 Crutzen
- 21502 Cruz
- 32449 Crystalmiller
- 27453 Crystalpoole
- 30337 Crystalzheng
- 142760 Csabai
- 24532 Csabakiss
- 175567 Csadaimre
- 450297 Csákánybéla
- 95785 Csányivilmos
- 338578 Csapodyvera
- 209089 Csépevaléria
- 25778 Csere
- 136273 Csermely
- 7644 Cslewis
- 75823 Csokonai
- 131762 Csonka
- 167018 Csontoscsaba
- 254846 Csontváry
- 589718 Csopak
- 270472 Csörgei
- 612477 Csörgeierika
- 600379 Csortosgyula
- 7641 Cteatus
- 11094 Cuba
- 2731 Cucula
- 16794 Cucullia
- 66999 Cudnik
- 19348 Cueca
- 2334 Cuffey
- 657932 Cuichenzhou
- 17029 Cuillandre
- 20858 Cuirongfeng
- 2275 Cuitlahuac
- 511238 Cuixiangqun
- 5639 Ćuk
- 26990 Culbertson
- 266921 Culhane
- 35056 Cullers
- 14348 Cumming
- 19573 Cummings
- 11672 Cuney
- 2226 Cunitza
- 1754 Cunningham
- 4183 Cuno
- 30297 Cupák
- 763 Cupido
- 15017 Cuppy
- 8656 Cupressus
- 103737 Curbeam
- 7126 Cureau
- 574300 Curelaru
- 7000 Curie
- 3898 Curlewis
- 434678 Curlin
- 30441 Curly
- 32897 Curtharris
- 3621 Curtis
- 333601 Curtiscalva
- 14232 Curtismiller
- 113395 Curtniebur
- 30550 Curtschneider
- 620096 Curupira
- 48737 Cusinato
- 33457 Cutillo
- 333081 Cutts
- 9614 Cuvier
- 1917 Cuyo
- 8279 Cuzco
- 23650 Čvančara
- 95072 ČVUT
- 403 Cyane
- 8757 Cyaneus
- 22701 Cyannaskye
- 65 Cybele
- 134329 Cycnos
- 1106 Cydonia
- 52975 Cyllarus
- 15992 Cynthia
- 32590 Cynthiachen
- 150046 Cynthiaconrad
- 14135 Cynthialang
- 28128 Cynthrossman
- 5123 Cynus
- 3582 Cyrano
- 6762 Cyrenagoodrich
- 133 Cyrene
- 90450 Cyriltyson
- 7209 Cyrus
- 30559 Cyrusavery
- 142822 Czarapata
- 2315 Czechoslovakia
- 6294 Czerny
- 17415 Czesławlang
- 815811 Cześstawikowski
- 185484 Czochralski
back to top

== See also ==
- List of minor planet discoverers
- List of observatory codes
- Meanings of minor planet names § Index
