= 3290 =

3290 may refer to:

- A.D. 3290, a year in the 4th millennium CE
- 3290 BC, a year in the 4th millennium BCE
- 3290, a number in the 3000 (number) range

== Other uses ==
- 3290 Azabu, an asteroid in the Asteroid Belt, the 3290th asteroid registered
- Texas Farm to Market Road 3290, a state highway
- IBM 3290, a plasma screen for the IBM 3270

== See also ==
- A3290 road in the UK
