= Erigone =

Erigone (Ἠριγόνη) may refer to:

- In Greek mythology:
  - Erigone (daughter of Icarius)
  - Erigone (daughter of Aegisthus)
- 163 Erigone, an asteroid.
- Erigone, a genus of spiders
- Erigone, Synonym for Panzeria, a genus of flies in the family Tachinidae
