= 8 Flora =

Large main-belt asteroid

- VLT-SPHERE image of Flora

Discovery
- Discovered by: J.R. Hind
- Discovery date: 18 October 1847

Designations
- Pronunciation: /ˈflɔːrə/
- Named after: Flōra
- Minor planet category: Main belt (Flora family)
- Adjectives: Florian /ˈflɔːriən/
- Symbol: (historical)

Orbital characteristics
- Epoch 17.0 October 2024 (JD 2460600.5)
- Aphelion: 2.55 AU (381 million km)
- Perihelion: 1.86 AU (278 million km)
- Semi-major axis: 2.20 AU (329 million km)
- Eccentricity: 0.15658
- Orbital period (sidereal): 3.27 yr (1192.70 d)
- Mean anomaly: 78.2°
- Inclination: 5.890°
- Longitude of ascending node: 110.85°
- Time of perihelion: 8 May 2027
- Argument of perihelion: 285.4°
- Earth MOID: 0.873 AU (130.6 million km)
- Jupiter MOID: 2.877 AU (430.4 million km)
- T_{Jupiter}: 3.642

Proper orbital elements
- Proper semi-major axis: 2.2014 AU
- Proper eccentricity: 0.1449
- Proper inclination: 5.574°
- Proper mean motion: 110.2 deg / yr
- Proper orbital period: 3.26679 yr (1193.194 d)
- Precession of perihelion long.: 32.017 arcsec / yr
- Precession of asc. node: −35.51 arcsec / yr

Physical characteristics
- Dimensions: 154 × 148 × 127 km (± 7 × 6 × 4 km)
- Mean diameter: 146±2 km
- Mass: (4.54±0.13)×10^{18} kg (2025) (Note: Calculated from its standard gravitational parameter GM = 0.303±0.009 km^{3}/s^{2}.) (4.61±0.22)×10^{18} kg (2023)
- Mean density: 2.79±0.14 g/cm^{3} (2025); 2.83±0.18 g/cm^{3} (2023)
- Synodic rotation period: 12.86667 ± 0.00001 h (0.53611125 ± 4.2×10^{−7} d)
- Axial tilt: 87°
- Pole ecliptic longitude: 337° ± 2°
- Pole ecliptic latitude: −1° ± 3°
- Geometric albedo: 0.224 (calculated); 0.226±0.041
- Spectral type: S
- Apparent magnitude: 7.9 to 11.6
- Absolute magnitude (H): 6.54; 6.61
- Angular diameter: 0.21" to 0.053"

8 Flora is a large, bright main-belt asteroid. It is the innermost large asteroid: no asteroid closer to the Sun has a diameter above 25 kilometers (20% that of Flora), and not until 20-km 149 Medusa was discovered was an asteroid known to orbit at a closer mean distance. It is the seventh-brightest asteroid with a mean opposition magnitude of +8.7. Flora can reach a magnitude of +8.1 at a favorable opposition near perihelion, such as occurred in November 2020 when it was 0.88 AU (132 million km; 340 LD) from Earth.

== Discovery and naming ==
Flora was discovered by J. R. Hind on 18 October 1847. It was his second asteroid discovery after 7 Iris.

The name Flora was proposed by John Herschel, from Flora, the Latin goddess of flowers and gardens, wife of Zephyrus (the personification of the West wind), and mother of Spring. The Greek equivalent is Chloris, who has her own asteroid, 410 Chloris, but in Greek 8 Flora is also called 8 Chloris (8 Χλωρίς).

The old iconic symbol for 8 Flora has been variously rendered as,, etc. It was added to Unicode 17.0 as U+1CEC2 𜻂. The original description for the symbol described it as a flower, but later authors per Schmadel (2012) identified it as the Rose of England.

== Characteristics ==
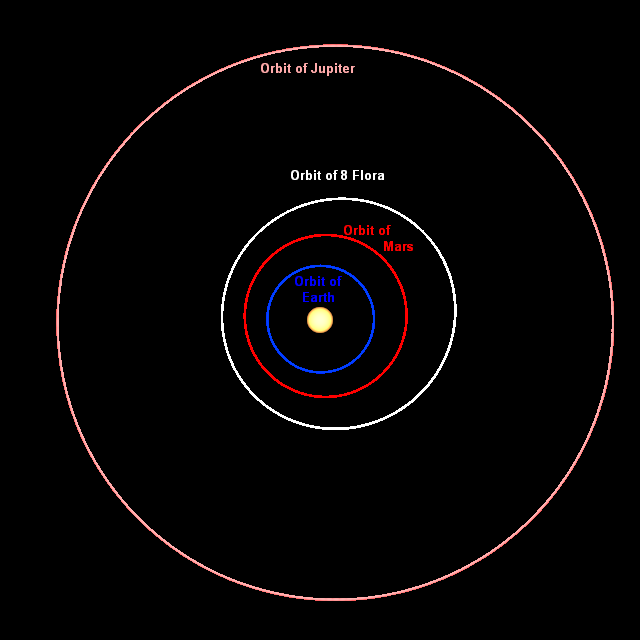
The orbit of 8 Flora compared with the orbits of Earth, Mars and Jupiter

Size comparison: the first 10 asteroids profiled against Earth's Moon. Flora is third from the right.

Two images, one hour apart, taken from an amateur telescope in Tenerife.

Flora's rotation pole points towards ecliptic coordinates (β, λ) = (−1°, 337°), giving an axial tilt of 87°.

Flora is the parent body of the Flora family of asteroids, and by far the largest member, comprising about 80% of the total mass of this family. Nevertheless, Flora was almost certainly disrupted by the impact(s) that formed the family, and is probably a gravitational aggregate of most of the pieces.

Flora's spectrum indicates that its surface composition is a mixture of silicate rock (including pyroxene and olivine) and nickel-iron metal. Flora, and the whole Flora family generally, are good candidates for being the parent bodies of the L chondrite meteorites. This meteorite type comprises 35% of meteorites impacting the Earth.

== Observational history ==
During an observation on 25 March 1917, 8 Flora was mistaken for the 15th-magnitude star TU Leonis, which led to that star's classification as a U Geminorum cataclysmic variable star. Flora had come to opposition on 1917 February 13, 40 days earlier. This mistake was uncovered only in 1995.

On 26 July 2013, Flora at magnitude 8.8 occulted the star 2UCAC 22807162 over parts of South America, Africa, and Asia.
