= Solon Irving Bailey =

American astronomer (1854–1931)

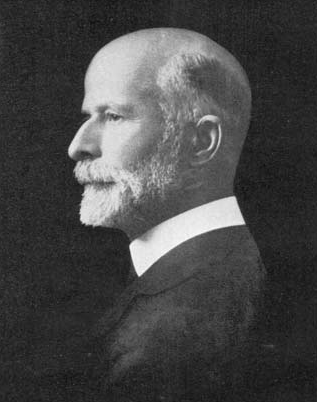
- Born: December 29, 1854; Lisbon, New Hampshire, U.S.
- Died: June 5, 1931 (aged 76); Hanover, New Hampshire, U.S.
- Education: Boston University; Harvard University
- Scientific career
- Fields: Astronomy, photography
- Workplaces: Harvard University

Solon Irving Bailey (December 29, 1854 – June 5, 1931) was an American astronomer and discoverer of the asteroid 504 Cora, on June 30, 1902.

Bailey joined the staff of Harvard College Observatory in 1887. He received a bachelor's and master's from Boston University in 1881 and 1884, and a master's from Harvard University in 1888. After the observatory received the "Boyden Fund" bequest from the will of Uriah A. Boyden, Bailey played a major role in finding a site for Boyden Station in Arequipa, Peru, and was in charge of it from 1892 to 1919. He was also one of the first to carry out meteorological studies in Peru, traveling extensively in desolate areas at very high altitude. Boyden Station was moved to South Africa in 1927 due to better weather conditions and became known as the Boyden Observatory.

He made extensive studies of variable stars in globular clusters in the southern skies. He also performed a light-curve analysis measuring the rotation period of the near-Earth asteroid 433 Eros during its 1903 opposition. Bailey was acting director of Harvard College Observatory from 1919 to 1921 after the death of Edward Charles Pickering and prior to the appointment of Harlow Shapley. He worked as a senior colleague with Henrietta Leavitt. He was elected a Fellow of the American Academy of Arts and Sciences in 1892. Irving died on June 5, 1931, aged 76, in Hanover, New Hampshire, from an illness caused by heart disease.
