= 180 Garumna =

Main-belt asteroid

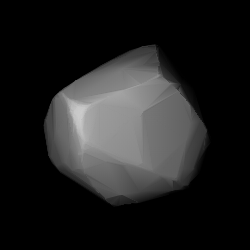
- 3D convex shape model of 180 Garumna

Discovery
- Discovered by: J. Perrotin
- Discovery date: 29 January 1878

Designations
- Pronunciation: /ɡəˈrʌmnə/
- Minor planet category: Main belt

Orbital characteristics
- Epoch 31 July 2016 (JD 2457600.5)
- Uncertainty parameter 0
- Observation arc: 96.73 yr (35331 d)
- Aphelion: 3.1722 AU (474.55 Gm)
- Perihelion: 2.2739 AU (340.17 Gm)
- Semi-major axis: 2.7231 AU (407.37 Gm)
- Eccentricity: 0.16494
- Orbital period (sidereal): 4.49 yr (1641.3 d)
- Mean anomaly: 301.92°
- Mean motion: 0° 13^{m} 9.624^{s} / day
- Inclination: 0.86595°
- Longitude of ascending node: 312.18°
- Argument of perihelion: 175.87°
- Earth MOID: 1.28761 AU (192.624 Gm)
- Jupiter MOID: 1.89216 AU (283.063 Gm)
- T_{Jupiter}: 3.338

Physical characteristics
- Mean diameter: ~23.4 km
- Synodic rotation period: 23.866 h (0.9944 d)
- Spectral type: S
- Absolute magnitude (H): 10.31

180 Garumna is a main belt asteroid that was discovered by the French astronomer Henri Joseph Perrotin on January 29, 1878. Its name comes from the ancient Latin name for the Garonne River in France. This object is orbiting the Sun at a distance of 2.72 AU with an eccentricity of 0.165 and an orbital period of 4.49 years. The orbital plane is inclined at an angle of 0.87° to the plane of the ecliptic.

Based on infrared observations, this object has a diameter of 23.4 km. In the Tholen classification system, it is categorized as a stony S-type asteroid, while the Bus asteroid taxonomy system lists it with the Sr sub-type.

The rotation period of this asteroid is very nearly equal to that of the rotation of the Earth. This means that only a small portion of the light curve can be observed from any one location, requiring measurements from multiple sites in order to build a complete curve. In 2012, this mission was accomplished, giving a period of 23.866±0.001 hours with a brightness variation of 0.42±0.02 in magnitude. Allowing for a margin of error and changes in phase angle, this finding agrees with previous measurements made in 2008 and 2011.
