= Henri Joseph Anastase Perrotin =

French astronomer (1845–1904)

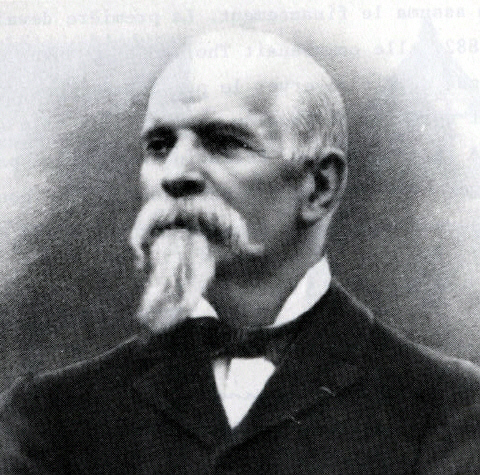
Henri Joseph Anastase Perrotin

Minor planets discovered: 6
138 Tolosa	May 19, 1874	MPC
149 Medusa	September 21, 1875	MPC
163 Erigone	April 26, 1876	MPC
170 Maria	January 10, 1877	MPC
180 Garumna	January 29, 1878	MPC
252 Clementina	October 11, 1885	MPC

Martian crater Perrotin

Henri Joseph Anastase Perrotin (December 19, 1845 – February 29, 1904) was a French astronomer and a discoverer of minor planets. Some sources give his middle name as Athanase.

In his early career, he and Guillaume Bigourdan were assistants of Félix Tisserand at Toulouse Observatory. Later, he was the first director of the Nice Observatory in Nice, France from 1884 until his death. He made observations of Mars and attempted to determine the rotation period of Venus. He also calculated perturbations in the orbit of 4 Vesta.

In the literature, he is sometimes referred to as Henri Perrotin and sometimes as Joseph Perrotin (this is indeed one and the same person). He is also referenced in H. G. Wells's novel The War of the Worlds as "Perrotin of Nice". His 6 asteroid discoveries are credited by the Minor Planet Center to "J. Perrotin".

He won the Prix Lalande in 1875 and 1883. The Martian crater Perrotin and the inner main-belt asteroid 1515 Perrotin were named in his honor.
