= 149 Medusa =

Main-belt asteroid

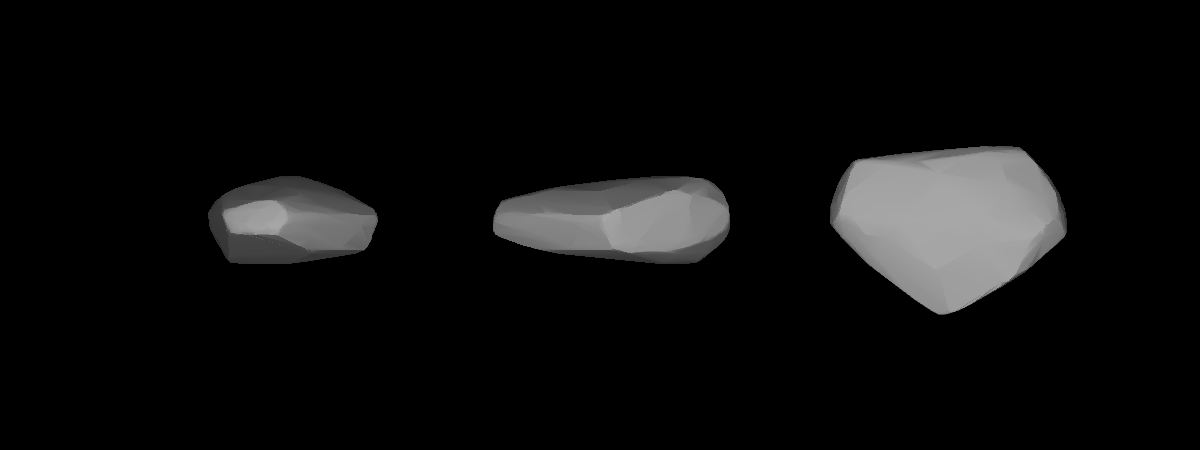
- A three-dimensional model of 149 Medusa based on its light curve.

Discovery
- Discovered by: Henri Joseph Perrotin
- Discovery date: 21 September 1875

Designations
- Pronunciation: /mɪˈdjuːsə/
- Named after: Medusa
- Alternative designations: A875 SA; 1905 BA; 1906 HB
- Minor planet category: Main belt

Orbital characteristics
- Epoch 31 July 2016 (JD 2457600.5)
- Uncertainty parameter 0
- Observation arc: 124.55 yr (45493 d)
- Aphelion: 2.32 AU (346.60 Gm)
- Perihelion: 2.03 AU (304.06 Gm)
- Semi-major axis: 2.17 AU (325.33 Gm)
- Eccentricity: 0.065386
- Orbital period (sidereal): 3.21 yr (1,171.4 d)
- Average orbital speed: 20.18 km/s
- Mean anomaly: 280.686°
- Mean motion: 0° 18^{m} 26.374^{s} / day
- Inclination: 0.93927°
- Longitude of ascending node: 159.615°
- Argument of perihelion: 250.609°
- Earth MOID: 1.04 AU (155.77 Gm)
- Jupiter MOID: 2.88 AU (430.38 Gm)
- T_{Jupiter}: 3.683

Physical characteristics
- Dimensions: 19.75±0.9 km
- Mass: 8.0×10^{15} kg
- Mean density: 2.0 g/cm^{3}
- Equatorial surface gravity: 0.0055 m/s^{2}
- Equatorial escape velocity: 0.0104 km/s
- Synodic rotation period: 26.023 h (1.0843 d); 26.038 h
- Geometric albedo: 0.2334±0.022
- Temperature: ~189 K
- Spectral type: S
- Absolute magnitude (H): 10.79

149 Medusa is a bright-coloured, stony main-belt asteroid that was discovered by French astronomer J. Perrotin on September 21, 1875, and named after the Gorgon Medusa, a snake-haired monster in Greek mythology. It is orbiting the Sun at a distance of 2.17 AU with a period of 3.21 years and an eccentricity of 0.065. The orbital plane is tilted slightly at an angle of 0.94° to the plane of the ecliptic.

When it was discovered, Medusa was by far the smallest asteroid found (although this was not known at that time). Since then, many thousands of smaller asteroids have been found. It was also the closest asteroid to the Sun discovered up to that point, beating the long-held record of 8 Flora. It remained the closest asteroid to the Sun until 433 Eros and 434 Hungaria were found in 1898, leading to the discovery of two new families of asteroids inward from the 4:1 Kirkwood gap which forms the boundary of the main belt.

Photometric observations of this asteroid at the Organ Mesa Observatory in Las Cruces, New Mexico, during 2010 gave a light curve with a rather long rotation period of 26.038 ± 0.002 hours and a brightness variation of 0.56 ± 0.03 in magnitude.
