= 138 Tolosa =

Main-belt asteroid

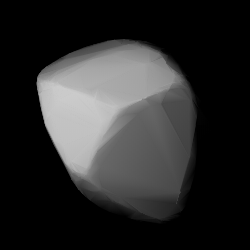
- 3D convex shape model of 138 Tolosa

Discovery
- Discovered by: Henri Joseph Perrotin
- Discovery date: 19 May 1874

Designations
- Pronunciation: /toʊˈloʊsə/
- Named after: Toulouse (Tolōsa)
- Alternative designations: A874 KA; 1909 SB
- Minor planet category: Main belt

Orbital characteristics
- Epoch 31 July 2016 (JD 2457600.5)
- Uncertainty parameter 0
- Observation arc: 110.38 yr (40315 d)
- Aphelion: 2.8463 AU (425.80 Gm)
- Perihelion: 2.05145 AU (306.893 Gm)
- Semi-major axis: 2.44887 AU (366.346 Gm)
- Eccentricity: 0.16229
- Orbital period (sidereal): 3.83 yr (1399.7 d)
- Average orbital speed: 18.91 km/s
- Mean anomaly: 348.297°
- Mean motion: 0° 15^{m} 25.884^{s} / day
- Inclination: 3.2038°
- Longitude of ascending node: 54.762°
- Argument of perihelion: 260.825°

Physical characteristics
- Dimensions: 51.86 ± 3.07 km 45.50±2.1 km
- Mass: (4.93 ± 2.59) × 10^{17} kg
- Mean density: 6.74 ± 3.74 g/cm^{3}
- Equatorial surface gravity: 0.0127 m/s²
- Equatorial escape velocity: 0.0241 km/s
- Synodic rotation period: 10.101 h (0.4209 d); 10.103 h
- Geometric albedo: 0.2699±0.027
- Temperature: ~178 K
- Spectral type: S
- Absolute magnitude (H): 8.75

138 Tolosa is a brightly coloured, stony background asteroid from the inner region of the asteroid belt. It was discovered by French astronomer Henri Joseph Perrotin on 19 May 1874, and named by the Latin and Occitan name ([tɔˈloːsa] and [tuˈluzɔ]) of the French city of Toulouse.

This object is orbiting the Sun at a distance of 2.45 AU with an eccentricity of 0.16 and an orbital period of 3.83 years. Its orbital plane is inclined at an angle of 3.2° relative to the plane of the ecliptic. Measurements of its diameter range from 46 to 52 km. It is spinning with a rotation period of 10.1 hours.

The spectrum of this asteroid rules out the presence of ordinary chondrites, while leaning in favor of clinopyroxene phases. As of 2006, there are no known meteorites with compositions similar to the spectrum of 138 Tolosa.
