= 170 Maria =

S-type Main-belt asteroid

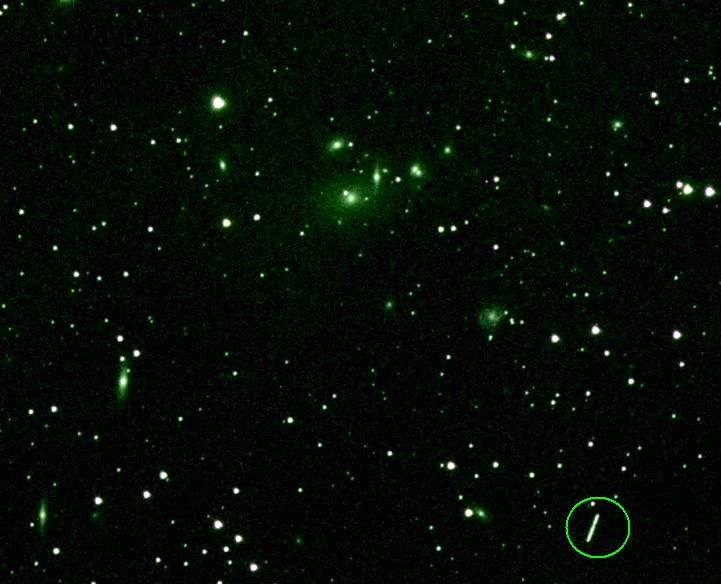
- Asteroid Maria passing near a cluster of galaxies as seen by a four inch telescope over a period of nearly two hours.

Discovery
- Discovered by: J. Perrotin
- Discovery date: 10 January 1877

Designations
- Pronunciation: /məˈriːə/ mə-REE-ə
- Alternative designations: A877 AA; 1958 AC
- Minor planet category: Main belt (Maria)

Orbital characteristics
- Epoch 31 July 2016 (JD 2457600.5)
- Uncertainty parameter 0
- Observation arc: 116.69 yr (42622 d)
- Aphelion: 2.7161 AU (406.32 Gm)
- Perihelion: 2.3923 AU (357.88 Gm)
- Semi-major axis: 2.5542 AU (382.10 Gm)
- Eccentricity: 0.063388
- Orbital period (sidereal): 4.08 yr (1491.0 d)
- Mean anomaly: 88.062°
- Mean motion: 0° 14^{m} 29.184^{s} / day
- Inclination: 14.377°
- Longitude of ascending node: 301.34°
- Argument of perihelion: 159.21°
- Earth MOID: 1.4114 AU (211.14 Gm)
- Jupiter MOID: 2.39948 AU (358.957 Gm)
- T_{Jupiter}: 3.392

Physical characteristics
- Dimensions: 44.30±1.0 km
- Synodic rotation period: 13.120 h (0.5467 d)
- Geometric albedo: 0.1579±0.007
- Spectral type: S
- Absolute magnitude (H): 9.39

170 Maria is a Main belt asteroid that was discovered by French astronomer Henri Joseph Perrotin on 10 January 1877. Its orbit was computed by Antonio Abetti, and the asteroid was named after his sister, Maria. This is the namesake of the Maria asteroid family; one of the first asteroid families to be identified by Japanese astronomer Kiyotsugu Hirayama in 1918. This family may be the parent body of the large near-Earth objects 433 Eros and 1036 Ganymed.

This object is orbiting the Sun at a distance of 2.55 AU with a low eccentricity of 0.063 and an orbital period of 4.08 years. The orbital plane is inclined at an angle of 14.4° to the plane of the ecliptic. The diameter of this body has been measured as 44.3 km.

In the Tholen classification system, this is categorized as a stony S-type asteroid based on its spectrum. Observations performed at the Palmer Divide Observatory in Colorado Springs, Colorado during 2007 produced a light curve with a period of 13.120±0.002 hours and a brightness range of 0.21±0.02 in magnitude. Previous measurements from 2000 gave 13.14 and 5.510 hour estimates for the period.

An occultation of a star by Maria was observed from Manitoba, Canada, on 10 June 1997.
