= 3642 Frieden =

Carbonaceous main-belt asteroid

Discovery
- Discovered by: H. Gessner
- Discovery site: Sonneberg Obs.
- Discovery date: 4 December 1953

Designations
- Named after: Pax (goddess)
- Alternative designations: 1953 XL_{1} · 1936 FU; 1945 BD · 1950 FK; 1959 CB_{1} · 1959 EB_{1} 1978 GB_{3} · 1982 BK_{8} A908 ED
- Minor planet category: main-belt · (middle)

Orbital characteristics
- Epoch 4 September 2017 (JD 2458000.5)
- Uncertainty parameter 0
- Observation arc: 81.03 yr (29,595 days)
- Aphelion: 3.0142 AU
- Perihelion: 2.5600 AU
- Semi-major axis: 2.7871 AU
- Eccentricity: 0.0815
- Orbital period (sidereal): 4.65 yr (1,700 days)
- Mean anomaly: 202.73°
- Mean motion: 0° 12^{m} 42.48^{s} / day
- Inclination: 13.472°
- Longitude of ascending node: 131.30°
- Argument of perihelion: 14.702°

Physical characteristics
- Dimensions: 31.899±0.126 km 34.168±0.310 km 35.11±1.1 km 35.12 km (derived); 36.04±0.55 km
- Synodic rotation period: 14.491±0.003 h
- Geometric albedo: 0.046±0.002; 0.0474 (derived); 0.0475±0.003; 0.0602±0.0202; 0.071±0.007
- Spectral type: SMASS = C · C
- Absolute magnitude (H): 10.73±0.50 · 11.0 · 11.2

3642 Frieden, provisional designation 1953 XL_{1}, is a carbonaceous asteroid from the middle region of the asteroid belt, approximately 35 kilometers in diameter. It was discovered by German astronomer Herta Gessner at Sonneberg Observatory on 4 December 1953. It is named after the goddess of peace, Pax.

== Orbit and classification ==
Frieden orbits the Sun in the central main-belt at a distance of 2.6–3.0 AU once every 4 years and 8 months (1,700 days). Its orbit has an eccentricity of 0.08 and an inclination of 13° with respect to the ecliptic. The body was first identified as "1908 ED" at the U.S Taunton Observatory (803) in 1908, while its first used observation was made at the Belgian Uccle Observatory 1936, extending the asteroid's observation arc by 17 years prior to its official discovery.

== Physical characteristics ==
In the SMASS classification, Frieden is a carbonaceous C-type asteroid.

=== Diameter and albedo ===
According to the surveys carried out by the Infrared Astronomical Satellite IRAS, the Japanese Akari satellite, and NASA's Wide-field Infrared Survey Explorer with its subsequent NEOWISE mission, Frieden measures between 31.9 and 36.0 kilometers in diameter and its surface has an albedo between 0.046 and 0.071. The Collaborative Asteroid Lightcurve Link derives an albedo of 0.047 and a diameter of 35.1 kilometers, based on an absolute magnitude of 11.2. Between 2019 and 2021, 3642 Frieden has been observed to occult four stars.

=== Rotation period ===
In April 2006, a rotational lightcurve of Frieden was obtained from photometric observations by American astronomer Brian Warner at his Palmer Divide Observatory (716), Colorado. It gave a well-defined rotation period of 14.491±0.003 hours with a brightness variation of 0.13±0.02 magnitude (U=3).

== Naming ==
This minor planet was named after the German translation of the goddess Pax in the hope for peace (German: Frieden) around the world. The official naming citation was published by the Minor Planet Center on 2 February 1988 (M.P.C. 12808).
