= 3176 Paolicchi =

Main-belt asteroid

Discovery
- Discovered by: Z. Knežević
- Discovery site: Piszkéstető Stn.
- Discovery date: 13 November 1980

Designations
- Named after: Paolo Paolicchi (astrophysicist)
- Alternative designations: 1980 VR_{1} · 1931 UP; 1941 WC · 1941 WG_{1} 1951 XF_{1} · 1956 XD; 1965 UD · 1968 HM_{1} 1975 XU · 1978 JG; 1978 LQ · A902 WG
- Minor planet category: main-belt · (outer)

Orbital characteristics
- Epoch 4 September 2017 (JD 2458000.5)
- Uncertainty parameter 0
- Observation arc: 114.53 yr (41,832 days)
- Aphelion: 2.9658 AU
- Perihelion: 2.7854 AU
- Semi-major axis: 2.8756 AU
- Eccentricity: 0.0314
- Orbital period (sidereal): 4.88 yr (1,781 days)
- Mean anomaly: 170.54°
- Mean motion: 0° 12^{m} 7.56^{s} / day
- Inclination: 18.114°
- Longitude of ascending node: 53.209°
- Argument of perihelion: 25.596°

Physical characteristics
- Dimensions: 31.84±0.68 km 33.83 km (derived); 33.94±2.8 km (IRAS 15); 41.33±0.36 km
- Mass: (1.14±0.46)×10^{18} kg (Note: Calculated from its standard gravitational parameter GM = 0.076±0.031 km^{3}/s^{2}.)
- Mean density: 30.89 g/cm^{3} (Note: Assuming a diameter of 41.3 km.)
- Synodic rotation period: 20.4±0.5 h
- Geometric albedo: 0.038±0.007; 0.0511 (derived); 0.0669±0.012 (IRAS 15); 0.081±0.004
- Spectral type: C
- Absolute magnitude (H): 10.90 · 11.10 · 11.2 · 11.47±0.24

3176 Paolicchi, provisional designation 1980 VR_{1}, is a carbonaceous asteroid from the outer region of the asteroid belt, about 34 kilometers in diameter. It was discovered on 13 November 1980, by Serbian astronomer Zoran Knežević at the Konkoly Observatory's Piszkéstető Station northeast of Budapest, Hungary.

== Orbit and classification ==
The dark C-type asteroid orbits the Sun in the outer main-belt at a distance of 2.8–3.0 AU once every 4 years and 11 months (1,781 days). Its orbit has an eccentricity of 0.03 and an inclination of 18° with respect to the ecliptic. First identified as A902 WG at Heidelberg Observatory in 1902, the first used observation was made at the U.S. Lowell Observatory in 1931, when Paolicchi was identified as 1931 UP, extending its observation arc by 49 years prior to its official discovery observation.

== Physical characteristics ==
It has a rotation period of 20.400 hours and an albedo in the range of 0.04–0.08, according to the surveys carried out by the Infrared Astronomical Satellite, IRAS, the Japanese Akari satellite, and the Wide-field Infrared Survey Explorer with its subsequent NEOWISE mission. The Collaborative Asteroid Lightcurve Link derives an albedo of 0.05. Estimated diameters for Paolicchi range between 31.8 and 41.3 kilometers.

== Naming ==
This minor planet was named in honor of Italian astrophysicist Paolo Paolicchi (b. 1950) at the University of Pisa, whose research activity included the study on the dynamical and collisional history of Small Solar System bodies and the origin of planetary and stellar systems. Paolicchi's work on minor planets has focused on the modeling of catastrophic breakup events and on the evolution of their rotational properties. The official naming citation was published by the Minor Planet Center on 7 September 1987 (M.P.C. 12209).
