= 3045 Alois =

Main-belt asteroid

Discovery
- Discovered by: J. Wagner
- Discovery site: Anderson Mesa Stn.
- Discovery date: 8 January 1984

Designations
- Named after: Alois T. Stuczynski (discoverer's grandfather)
- Alternative designations: 1984 AW · 1954 QD; 1965 QD · 1971 SB_{3} 1982 SY_{3}
- Minor planet category: main-belt · (outer)

Orbital characteristics
- Epoch 4 September 2017 (JD 2458000.5)
- Uncertainty parameter 0
- Observation arc: 66.15 yr (24,160 days)
- Aphelion: 3.4822 AU
- Perihelion: 2.7782 AU
- Semi-major axis: 3.1302 AU
- Eccentricity: 0.1124
- Orbital period (sidereal): 5.54 yr (2,023 days)
- Mean anomaly: 120.77°
- Mean motion: 0° 10^{m} 40.8^{s} / day
- Inclination: 3.3434°
- Longitude of ascending node: 36.206°
- Argument of perihelion: 330.87°

Physical characteristics
- Dimensions: 23.51±1.58 km 26.64 km (calculated); 27.49±0.20 km
- Synodic rotation period: 3.7533±0.0058 h
- Geometric albedo: 0.057 (assumed); 0.059±0.009; 0.095±0.015
- Spectral type: X · C
- Absolute magnitude (H): 11.40 · 11.412±0.001 (R) · 11.50 · 11.6 · 11.91±0.17

3045 Alois, provisional designation 1984 AW, is a carbonaceous asteroid from the outer region of the asteroid belt, approximately 26 kilometers in diameter. The asteroid was discovered on 8 January 1984, by American astronomer Joe Wagner at Lowell's Anderson Mesa Station in Flagstaff, Arizona, United States. It was named after the discoverer's grandfather Alois Stuczynski.

== Orbit and classification ==
Alois orbits the Sun in the outer main-belt at a distance of 2.8–3.5 AU once every 5 years and 6 months (2,023 days). Its orbit has an eccentricity of 0.11 and an inclination of 3° with respect to the ecliptic. A first precovery was taken at Palomar Observatory in 1951, extending the body's observation arc by 33 years prior to its official discovery observation at Anderson Mesa.

== Physical characteristics ==
The C-type body is also classified as an X-type asteroid by Pan-STARRS' large-scale survey.

=== Rotation period ===
In November 2010, a rotational lightcurve of Alois was obtained from photometric observations made at the Palomar Transient Factory, California. It gave a rotation period of 3.7533±0.0058 hours with a brightness amplitude of 0.18 in magnitude (U=2).

=== Diameter and albedo ===
According to the space-based surveys by the Japanese Akari satellite and NASA's Wide-field Infrared Survey Explorer, Alois measures 23.5 and 27.5 kilometers in diameter, respectively, and has a corresponding albedo of 0.095 and 0.059. The Collaborative Asteroid Lightcurve Link assumes a standard albedo for carbonaceous asteroids of 0.057 and calculates a diameter of 26.6 kilometers.

== Naming ==
This minor planet was named by the discoverer in memory of his grandfather, Alois T. Stuczynski. The official naming citation was published by the Minor Planet Center on 7 March 1985 (M.P.C. 9479).
