= 252 Clementina =

Main-belt asteroid

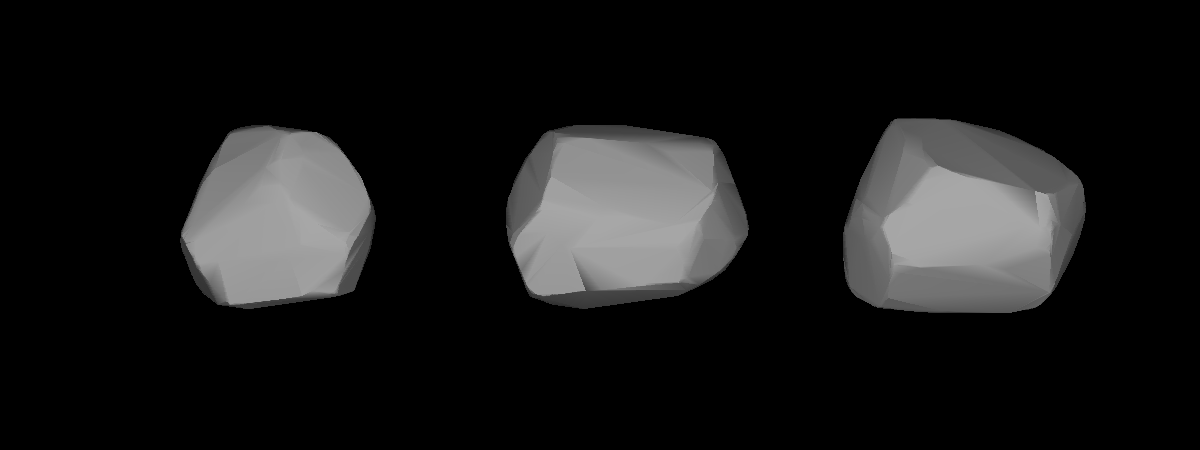
- Lightcurve-based 3D model of 252 Clementina

Discovery
- Discovered by: J. Perrotin
- Discovery date: 11 October 1885

Designations
- Alternative designations: A885 TB
- Minor planet category: Main belt

Orbital characteristics
- Epoch 31 July 2016 (JD 2457600.5)
- Uncertainty parameter 0
- Observation arc: 130.51 yr (47667 d)
- Aphelion: 3.3790 AU (505.49 Gm)
- Perihelion: 2.93952 AU (439.746 Gm)
- Semi-major axis: 3.15924 AU (472.616 Gm)
- Eccentricity: 0.069548
- Orbital period (sidereal): 5.62 yr (2051.0 d)
- Average orbital speed: 16.77 km/s
- Mean anomaly: 131.151°
- Mean motion: 0° 10^{m} 31.876^{s} / day
- Inclination: 10.044°
- Longitude of ascending node: 202.043°
- Argument of perihelion: 155.886°

Physical characteristics
- Dimensions: 69.29±4.4 km
- Synodic rotation period: 10.864 h (0.4527 d)
- Geometric albedo: 0.0843±0.012
- Absolute magnitude (H): 9.7

252 Clementina is a large main belt asteroid that was discovered by French astronomer Henri Joseph Anastase Perrotin on 11 October 1885 in Nice, France. The origin of the name is not known.

Photometric observations of this asteroid at the Organ Mesa Observatory in Las Cruces, New Mexico, during 2012 gave a light curve with a period of 10.864 ± 0.001 hours and a brightness variation of 0.37 ± 0.02 in magnitude. This result is in agreement with previous studies.
