= 504 Cora =

Main-belt asteroid

Discovery
- Discovered by: S. I. Bailey
- Discovery site: Boyden Stn.(Arequipa)
- Discovery date: 30 June 1902

Designations
- Named after: Mama Qura, second queen of the Kingdom of Cuzco
- Alternative designations: 1902 LK · 1947 OH
- Minor planet category: main-belt · (middle)

Orbital characteristics
- Epoch 16 February 2017 (JD 2457800.5)
- Uncertainty parameter 0
- Observation arc: 110.44 yr (40,337 days)
- Aphelion: 3.3127 AU
- Perihelion: 2.1296 AU
- Semi-major axis: 2.7212 AU
- Eccentricity: 0.2174
- Orbital period (sidereal): 4.49 yr (1,640 days)
- Mean anomaly: 147.01°
- Mean motion: 0° 13^{m} 10.56^{s} / day
- Inclination: 12.888°
- Longitude of ascending node: 104.63°
- Argument of perihelion: 247.92°

Physical characteristics
- Dimensions: 27.19±1.00 km 29.06 km (derived); 30.02±2.3 km (IRAS:40); 30.39±0.35 km 30.438±0.298; 34.994±0.490 km
- Synodic rotation period: 7.588±0.003 h 7.5882±0.0043 h 7.591±0.001 h 7.5915±0.0043; 24.06 h (dated)
- Geometric albedo: 0.1908 (derived); 0.239±0.032; 0.2509±0.0553; 0.336±0.010; 0.3407±0.058 (IRAS:40)
- Spectral type: SMASS = X · M · X
- Absolute magnitude (H): 9.4 · 9.776±0.001 (R) · 9.858±0.001 (R) · 10.00 · 10.07±0.35 · 10.1

504 Cora, provisional designation 1902 LK, is a metallic asteroid from the middle region of the asteroid belt, approximately 30 kilometers in diameter. It was discovered by American astronomer Solon Bailey at Harvard's Boyden Station in Arequipa, Peru, on 30 June 1902. It was later named after Cora, a figure in Inca mythology.

== Classification and orbit ==
Cora orbits the Sun in the middle main-belt at a distance of 2.1–3.3 AU once every 4 years and 6 months (1,640 days). Its orbit has an eccentricity of 0.22 and an inclination of 13° with respect to the ecliptic. The body's observation arc begins 4 years after its discovery with the first used observation made at Heidelberg in 1906.

== Physical characteristics ==
=== Spectral type ===
On the Tholen taxonomic scheme, as well as by the NEOWISE mission of NASA's Wide-field Infrared Survey Explorer (WISE), Cora is classified as a metallic M-type asteroid.

Mineralogic observations in the near-infrared with the NASA IRTF telescope using its SpeX spectrograph, showed that its surface is that of an X-type asteroid, with absorption features indicating the presence of pyroxene minerals. In 2004, the body's spectrum was also obtained in the SMASSII survey at the U.S. MDM Observatory, Kitt Peak, Arizona.

=== Rotation period ===
Several rotational lightcurves of Cora were obtained for this asteroid by astronomers Maria A. Barucci, David Higgins, Axel Martin, and the Palomar Transient Factory. With one exception, they all gave a rotation period close to 7.59 hours. Among these, David Higgins' observation made in September 2010, at the Hunters Hill Observatory (E14) in Ngunnawal, Australia – gave the best rated lightcurve with a period of 7.588±0.003 hours and a brightness variation of 0.20 magnitude (U=3-).

=== Diameter and albedo ===
According to the space-based surveys carried out by the Infrared Astronomical Satellite IRAS, the Japanese Akari satellite, and NASA's WISE telescope with its subsequent NEOWISE mission, Cora's surface has a high albedo between 0.239 and 0.341. Combined with their respective absolute magnitudes, this results in a diameter estimate of 27.2 to 35.0 kilometers. In contrast, the Collaborative Asteroid Lightcurve Link derives a much lower albedo of 0.19 and a diameter of 29.1 kilometers, based on an absolute magnitude of 10.1.

== Naming ==
This minor planet was named after Cora, a figure in Inca mythology (AN 169).
