= 3034 Climenhaga =

Stony Florian asteroid and synchronous binary asteroid

Discovery
- Discovered by: M. F. Wolf
- Discovery site: Heidelberg Obs.
- Discovery date: 24 September 1917

Designations
- Pronunciation: /ˈklaɪmɪnheɪɡə/
- Named after: John Climenhaga (Canadian astrophysicist)
- Alternative designations: A917 SE · 1949 UE_{1} 1952 KZ · 1970 OC; 1974 VN_{2} · 1974 XE; 1979 BD_{1} · 1981 XD
- Minor planet category: main-belt · Flora

Orbital characteristics
- Epoch 4 September 2017 (JD 2458000.5)
- Uncertainty parameter 0
- Observation arc: 99.24 yr (36,248 days)
- Aphelion: 2.8134 AU
- Perihelion: 1.8349 AU
- Semi-major axis: 2.3241 AU
- Eccentricity: 0.2105
- Orbital period (sidereal): 3.54 yr (1,294 days)
- Mean anomaly: 96.756°
- Mean motion: 0° 16^{m} 41.52^{s} / day
- Inclination: 4.9263°
- Longitude of ascending node: 10.621°
- Argument of perihelion: 314.01°
- Known satellites: 1

Physical characteristics
- Dimensions: 7.82 km (calculated)
- Synodic rotation period: 2.737485±0.000008 h
- Geometric albedo: 0.24 (assumed)
- Spectral type: S
- Absolute magnitude (H): 12.7 · 12.90±0.58

3034 Climenhaga /ˈklaɪmɪnheɪɡə/ is a stony Florian asteroid and synchronous binary asteroid from the inner regions of the asteroid belt, approximately 7.8 kilometers in diameter.

The asteroid was discovered on 24 September 1917 by German astronomer Max Wolf at Heidelberg Observatory in southwest Germany and assigned provisional designation A917 SE. It was later named after Canadian astrophysicist John Climenhaga. Its minor-planet moon has a period of nearly 19 hours.

== Orbital characteristics ==
Climenhaga is a member of the Flora family, one of the largest families of stony asteroids in the main belt. It orbits the Sun in the inner main-belt at a distance of 1.8–2.8 AU once every 3 years and 6 months (1,294 days). Its orbit has an eccentricity of 0.21 and an inclination of 5° with respect to the ecliptic.

The asteroid's observation arc begins with its official discovery observation at Heidelberg, as no precoveries were taken, and no prior identifications were made.

== Physical characteristics ==
=== Lightcurve ===
In July 2009, a rotational lightcurve of Climenhaga was obtained from photometric observations by an international collaboration led by Australian astronomer Julian Oey at Kingsgrove (E19) and Leura (E17) observatories. Lightcurve analysis gave a well-defined rotation period of 2.737485 hours with a brightness amplitude of 0.10 magnitude (U=3).

=== Diameter and albedo ===
Climenhaga has been characterized as a common S-type asteroid. The Collaborative Asteroid Lightcurve Link assumes an albedo of 0.24 – derived from 8 Flora, a S-type asteroid and the family's largest member and namesake – and calculates a diameter of 7.82 kilometers with an absolute magnitude of 12.7.

=== Satellite ===
During the photometric observation in July 2009, a minor-planet moon was discovered orbiting Climenhaga with an orbital period of 18.954 hours. The discovery was not announced until 2013. The satellite's orbit has an estimated semi-major axis of 19 kilometers.

== Naming ==
This minor planet was named in 1987 for Canadian John Leroy Climenhaga of the University of Victoria, in honour of his work in astrophysics. The approved naming citation was published by the Minor Planet Center on 16 December 1986 (M.P.C. 11441).
