= 3290 Azabu =

Main-belt asteroid

Discovery
- Discovered by: C. J. van Houten; I. van Houten-G. T. Gehrels
- Discovery site: Palomar Obs.
- Discovery date: 19 September 1973

Designations
- Named after: Azabu (City district of Tokyo)
- Alternative designations: 1973 SZ_{1} · 1982 VX_{2}
- Minor planet category: main-belt · (outer); Hilda · background

Orbital characteristics
- Epoch 23 March 2018 (JD 2458200.5)
- Uncertainty parameter 0
- Observation arc: 63.06 yr (23,034 d)
- Aphelion: 4.4853 AU
- Perihelion: 3.4579 AU
- Semi-major axis: 3.9716 AU
- Eccentricity: 0.1293
- Orbital period (sidereal): 7.92 yr (2,891 d)
- Mean anomaly: 44.445°
- Mean motion: 0° 7^{m} 28.2^{s} / day
- Inclination: 2.7728°
- Longitude of ascending node: 75.105°
- Argument of perihelion: 110.73°
- Jupiter MOID: 0.4837 AU
- T_{Jupiter}: 3.0410

Physical characteristics
- Mean diameter: 10.185±0.504 km 21.16 km (calculated)
- Synodic rotation period: 7.670±0.005 h (Note: Lightcurve plot of (3290) Azabu, B. D. Warner at the CS3 (April 2017). Rotation period 7.670±0.005 hours with a brightness amplitude of 0.23±0.02 mag. Total of 190 points. Quality code of 3-. Summary figures at the LCDB.); 12 h (poor)
- Geometric albedo: 0.057 (assumed); 0.32±0.08; 0.324±0.082
- Spectral type: XL (SDSS-MOC); XL (Pan-STARRS); C (SDSS-MFB) (Note: Search for Unusual Spectroscopic Candidates Among 40313 minor planets from the 3rd Release of the Sloan Digital Sky Survey Moving Object Catalog (publication). SDSS-MFB (Masi Foglia Binzel) taxonomy (catalog).)
- Absolute magnitude (H): 11.81; 12.1; 12.31±0.23

3290 Azabu, provisional designation 1973 SZ_{1}, is a dynamical Hildian asteroid from the outermost regions of the asteroid belt, approximately 10–20 kilometers (6–10 miles) in diameter. It was discovered on 19 September 1973, by Dutch astronomers Ingrid and Cornelis van Houten at Leiden, and Tom Gehrels the Palomar Observatory. The asteroid has a rotation period of 7.67 hours. It was named after the former city district of Tokyo, Azabu.

== Orbit and classification ==
Azabu is a member of the dynamical Hilda group, located beyond the actual core region of the asteroid belt, and locked in a 3:2 orbital resonance with the gas giant Jupiter. This means that for every 2 orbits Jupiter completes around the Sun, a Hildian asteroid will complete 3 orbits. While it belongs to the dynamical Hilda group, Azabu, is not a member of the Hilda family (001), but an asteroid of the background population.

This asteroid orbits the Sun in the outer main-belt at a distance of 3.5–4.5 AU once every 7 years and 11 months (2,891 days; semi-major axis of 3.97 AU). Its orbit has an eccentricity of 0.13 and an inclination of 3° with respect to the ecliptic. The body's observation arc begins with a precovery taken at Palomar in April 1954, or 29 years prior to its official discovery observation.

=== Palomar–Leiden Trojan survey ===
Despite being discovered during the second Palomar–Leiden Trojan survey in 1973, Azabu has not received a provisional survey designation starting with "T-2". This may be related to the swapped naming rights proposed by Tom Gehrels (see below). The survey was a fruitful collaboration between the Palomar and Leiden observatories during the 1960s and 1970s. Gehrels used Palomar's Samuel Oschin telescope (also known as the 48-inch Schmidt Telescope), and shipped the photographic plates to Ingrid and Cornelis van Houten at Leiden Observatory where astrometry was carried out. The trio are credited with the discovery of several thousand asteroid discoveries.

== Physical characteristics ==
The asteroid has been characterized as an XL-type by Pan-STARRS and in the SDSS-based taxonomy. It is also characterized as a carbonaceous C-type asteroid in the SDSS-MFB (Masi Foglia Binzel) taxonomy.

=== Rotation period ===
In April 2017, a rotational lightcurve of Azabu was obtained from photometric observations by Brian Warner and Robert Stephens at the Center for Solar System Studies in California. Lightcurve analysis gave a secure rotation period of 7.670 hours with a brightness amplitude of 0.23 magnitude (U=3-), superseding a measurement of approximately 12 hours from the 1990s (U=1).

=== Diameter and albedo ===
According to the survey carried out by the NEOWISE mission of NASA's Wide-field Infrared Survey Explorer, Azabu measures 10.2 kilometers in diameter and its surface has an albedo between 0.32. The Collaborative Asteroid Lightcurve Link assumes a much lower carbonaceous standard albedo of 0.057 (based on the Masi Foglia Binzel taxonomy) and consequently calculates a much larger diameter of 21.16 kilometers with an absolute magnitude of 12.1.

== Naming ==
This minor planet was named after Azabu, a former district of the city of Tokyo, where the Tokyo Astronomical Observatory was previously located. The official naming citation was published by the Minor Planet Center on 16 December 1986 (M.P.C. 11442).

Based on a proposal by the discoverer Tom Gehrels, the naming right for this asteroid were swapped with 3291 Dunlap (discovered by Japanese astronomers), in order to create a quartet of sequentially named asteroids named after Lawrence Dunlap, Bob Sather, Ronald Raylor, and Carl Vesely (numbers 3291–3294).
