= 3960 Chaliubieju =

Main-belt asteroid

Discovery
- Discovered by: Purple Mountain Obs.
- Discovery site: Purple Mountain Obs.
- Discovery date: 20 January 1955

Designations
- Named after: Cha Liubieju (friend of a discoverer)
- Alternative designations: 1955 BG · 1984 YZ_{3} A921 EF
- Minor planet category: main-belt · (middle)

Orbital characteristics
- Epoch 4 September 2017 (JD 2458000.5)
- Uncertainty parameter 0
- Observation arc: 62.45 yr (22,811 days)
- Aphelion: 3.3782 AU
- Perihelion: 1.9050 AU
- Semi-major axis: 2.6416 AU
- Eccentricity: 0.2788
- Orbital period (sidereal): 4.29 yr (1,568 days)
- Mean anomaly: 217.16°
- Mean motion: 0° 13^{m} 46.56^{s} / day
- Inclination: 14.414°
- Longitude of ascending node: 84.839°
- Argument of perihelion: 12.605°

Physical characteristics
- Dimensions: 7.13±1.18 km 8.13±1.44 km 8.997±0.259 km 9.00±0.26 km 14.57 km (calculated)
- Synodic rotation period: 3.984±0.002 h 3.986±0.001 h
- Geometric albedo: 0.10 (assumed); 0.288±0.030; 0.32±0.17; 0.34±0.11
- Spectral type: S
- Absolute magnitude (H): 12.20 · 12.3 · 12.38±0.25 · 12.4 · 12.57

3960 Chaliubieju, provisional designation 1955 BG, is a stony asteroid from the central regions of the asteroid belt, approximately 9 kilometers in diameter. It was discovered on 20 January 1955, by astronomers at the Purple Mountain Observatory in Nanjing, China. The asteroid was named after Cha Liubieju, a friend of one of the discoverers.

== Orbit and classification ==
Chaliubieju is an asteroid of the main belt's background population that does not belong to any known asteroid family. It orbits the Sun in the central main-belt at a distance of 1.9–3.4 AU once every 4 years and 3 months (1,568 days). Its orbit has an eccentricity of 0.28 and an inclination of 14° with respect to the ecliptic.

The asteroid was first identified as A921 EF at Bergedorf Observatory in March 1921. The body's observation arc begins at Nanjing, two days after its official discovery observation.

== Physical characteristics ==
Chaliubieju is an assumed S-type asteroid.

=== Rotation period ===
In February 2011, a rotational lightcurve of Chaliubieju was obtained French amateur astronomer Pierre Antonini. Lightcurve analysis gave a rotation period of 3.986 hours with a brightness variation of 0.27 magnitude (U=3). One month later another photometric observation at the Astronomical Research Observatory (H21) gave a concurring period of 3.984 hours and an amplitude of 0.30 magnitude (U=3-).

=== Diameter and albedo ===
According to the survey carried out by the NEOWISE mission of NASA's Wide-field Infrared Survey Explorer, Chaliubieju measures between 7.13 and 9.00 kilometers in diameter and its surface has an albedo between 0.288 and 0.34, while the Collaborative Asteroid Lightcurve Link assumes an albedo of 0.10 and calculates a diameter of 14.57 kilometers based on an absolute magnitude of 12.3.

== Naming ==
This minor planet was named after Cha Liubieju, a friend of one of the discovering astronomers at the Purple Mountain Observatory. Liubieju is noted for her social work with sick and destitute mothers and children in China. The official naming citation was published by the Minor Planet Center on 5 October 1998 (M.P.C. 32787).
