= 3578 Carestia =

Main-belt asteroid

Discovery
- Discovered by: Félix Aguilar Obs.
- Discovery site: El Leoncito
- Discovery date: 11 February 1977

Designations
- Named after: Reinaldo Carestia (South American astronomer)
- Alternative designations: 1977 CC · 1939 PL; 1950 LG · 1985 RY
- Minor planet category: main-belt · (outer)

Orbital characteristics
- Epoch 4 September 2017 (JD 2458000.5)
- Uncertainty parameter 0
- Observation arc: 77.73 yr (28,391 days)
- Aphelion: 3.8780 AU
- Perihelion: 2.5496 AU
- Semi-major axis: 3.2138 AU
- Eccentricity: 0.2067
- Orbital period (sidereal): 5.76 yr (2,104 days)
- Mean anomaly: 220.68°
- Mean motion: 0° 10^{m} 15.96^{s} / day
- Inclination: 21.293°
- Longitude of ascending node: 284.70°
- Argument of perihelion: 47.939°

Physical characteristics
- Dimensions: 42.882±0.066; 49.113±0.881 km 57.80±2.3 km (IRAS:9); 58.07±0.98 km 59.29 km (derived); 64.64±1.54 km
- Synodic rotation period: 7.08 h 9.93±0.01 h
- Geometric albedo: 0.0121±0.001 (IRAS:9); 0.020 (derived); 0.0292±0.0066; 0.039±0.012; 0.051±0.002
- Spectral type: C
- Absolute magnitude (H): 10.08±0.59 · 10.10 · 10.3 · 11.0 · 11.60

3578 Carestia, provisional designation 1977 CC, is an extremely dark asteroid from the outer region of the asteroid belt, approximately 58 kilometers in diameter. It was discovered on 11 February 1977, by the staff of the Felix Aguilar Observatory at El Leoncito Complex in San Juan, Argentina. The asteroid was named after South American astronomer Reinaldo Carestia.

== Orbit and classification ==
Carestia orbits the Sun in the outer main-belt at a distance of 2.5–3.9 AU once every 5 years and 9 months (2,104 days). Its orbit has an eccentricity of 0.21 and an inclination of 21° with respect to the ecliptic. The first precovery was taken at Crimea-Simeis in 1939, extending the asteroid's observation arc by 38 years prior to its discovery.

== Physical characteristics ==
The carbonaceous C-type asteroid is one of the darkest main-belt asteroids known.

=== Rotation period ===
In September 2008, a rotational lightcurve was obtained from photometric observations made by Italian astronomer Federico Manzini at the Stazione Astronomica di Sozzago (A12), Italy. It rendered it a rotation period of 9.93±0.01 hours with a brightness variation of 0.13 in magnitude (U=2). Previously, a fragmentary lightcurve from the 1990s, gave a shorter period of 7.1 hours with an amplitude of 0.25 (U=1).

=== Diameter and albedo ===
According to the space-based surveys carried out by the Infrared Astronomical Satellite, IRAS, the Japanese Akari satellite, and NASA's Wide-field Infrared Survey Explorer with its subsequent NEOWISE mission, the asteroid's surface has an exceptionally low albedo between 0.012 and 0.051. Combined with the observation's corresponding absolute magnitude, this results in an inferred diameter of 42.9 to 64.6 kilometers. The Collaborative Asteroid Lightcurve Link derives an albedo of 0.02 and a diameter of 59.3 kilometers.

== Naming ==
This minor planet was named after of South American astronomer Reinaldo Augusto Carestia (1932–1993), professor of positional astronomy at UNSJ's School of Topography, publisher of 5 star catalogs, and member of the National Committee of Scientific and Technological Research of Chile. For decades, he worked with the Repsold Meridian Circle at the discovering Felix Aguilar Observatory. The official naming citation was published by the Minor Planet Center on 19 October 1994 (M.P.C. 24120).
