= 3015 Candy =

Main-belt asteroid

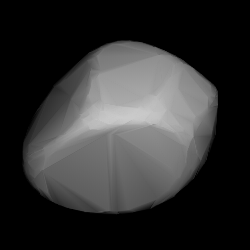
- Shape model of Candy from its lightcurve

Discovery
- Discovered by: E. Bowell
- Discovery site: Anderson Mesa Stn.
- Discovery date: 9 November 1980

Designations
- Named after: Michael P. Candy (British astronomer)
- Alternative designations: 1980 VN · 1974 VL_{2} 1974 XC · 1984 HS
- Minor planet category: main-belt · (outer)

Orbital characteristics
- Epoch 4 September 2017 (JD 2458000.5)
- Uncertainty parameter 0
- Observation arc: 52.17 yr (19,056 days)
- Aphelion: 3.9747 AU
- Perihelion: 2.7983 AU
- Semi-major axis: 3.3865 AU
- Eccentricity: 0.1737
- Orbital period (sidereal): 6.23 yr (2,276 days)
- Mean anomaly: 0.7451°
- Mean motion: 0° 9^{m} 29.52^{s} / day
- Inclination: 17.402°
- Longitude of ascending node: 38.162°
- Argument of perihelion: 300.96°

Physical characteristics
- Mean diameter: 24.517±0.470 km 33.54 km (calculated)
- Synodic rotation period: 4.6249±0.0001 h 4.625±0.001 h 4.62501±0.00004 h 4.62516 h 4.625223 h
- Pole ecliptic latitude: (142.0°, −26.0°) (λ_{1}/β_{1}); (346.0°, −70.0°) (λ_{2}/β_{2})
- Geometric albedo: 0.057 (assumed); 0.1067±0.0173
- Spectral type: C (assumed)
- Absolute magnitude (H): 11.1 · 11.14±0.34

3015 Candy (prov. designation: 1980 VN) is a background asteroid from the outer regions of the asteroid belt, approximately 25 kilometers (16 miles) in diameter. It was discovered on 9 November 1980, by British-American astronomer Edward Bowell at Anderson Mesa Station in Flagstaff, Arizona. The asteroid was named after British astronomer Michael P. Candy.

== Orbit and classification ==
Candy is a background asteroid that does not belong to any known asteroid family. It orbits the Sun in the outer main-belt at a distance of 2.8–4.0 AU once every 6 years and 3 months (2,276 days). Its orbit has an eccentricity of 0.17 and an inclination of 17° with respect to the ecliptic. The body's observation arc begins with a precovery taken at Goethe Link Observatory in May 1965, more than 15 years prior to its official discovery observation at Anderson Mesa.

== Naming ==
This minor planet was named after Michael P. Candy (1928–1994) a British astronomer and discoverer of minor planets and comets, who was a director of the Royal Greenwich Observatory and Perth Observatory. As a long-time astrometrist and orbit computer, he discovered comet C/1960 Y1 (Candy) at Greenwich, as well as the minor planet 3898 Curlewis, 3893 DeLaeter and 3894 Williamcooke. He was also president of IAU's Commission VI. The official naming citation was published by the Minor Planet Center on 22 June 1986 (M.P.C. 10845).

== Physical characteristics ==
Candy is an assumed carbonaceous C-type asteroid.

=== Lightcurves ===
Several rotational lightcurves of Candy were obtained from photometric observations by astronomer Maurice Clark. Lightcurve analysis gave a well-defined rotation period between 4.6249 and 4.62516 hours with a brightness variation between 0.50 and 1.05 magnitude (U=3/3/3/3/3). (A high brightness amplitude typically indicates that a body has a non-spheroidal shape.)

A 2016-published lightcurve, using modeled photometric data from the Lowell Photometric Database (LPD), gave a concurring period of 4.625223 hours (U=2), as well as two spin axis of (142.0°, −26.0°) and (346.0°, −70.0°) in ecliptic coordinates (λ, β). Clark's spin modeling also suggests that Candy has a retrograde rotation, and a spin axis of (306.0°, 43.0.0°), that is nearly aligned with the body's shortest axis.

=== Diameter and albedo ===
According to the survey carried out by the NEOWISE mission of NASA's Wide-field Infrared Survey Explorer, Candy measures 24.517 kilometers in diameter and its surface has an albedo of 0.1067, while the Collaborative Asteroid Lightcurve Link assumes a standard albedo for carbonaceous of 0.057, and calculates a diameter of 33.54 kilometers based on an absolute magnitude of 11.1.
