= 410 Chloris =

Main-belt asteroid

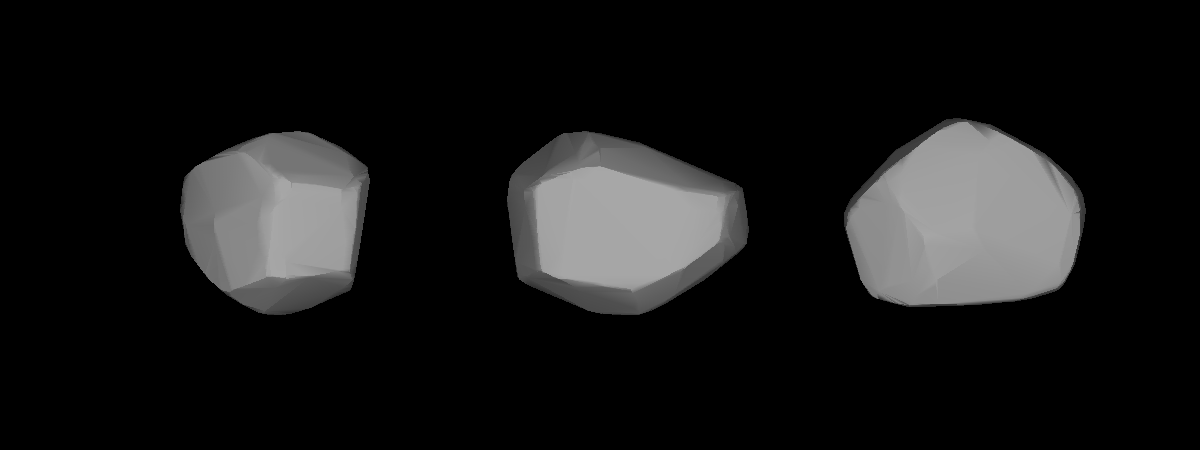
- Lightcurve-base 3D-model of 410 Chloris.

Discovery
- Discovered by: Auguste Charlois
- Discovery date: 7 January 1896

Designations
- Pronunciation: /ˈklɔːrɪs/
- Named after: Chloris
- Alternative designations: 1896 CH
- Minor planet category: Main belt (Chloris)
- Adjectives: Chloridian

Orbital characteristics
- Epoch 31 July 2016 (JD 2457600.5)
- Uncertainty parameter 0
- Observation arc: 105.91 yr (38683 d)
- Aphelion: 3.38204 AU (505.946 Gm)
- Perihelion: 2.0659 AU (309.05 Gm)
- Semi-major axis: 2.72395 AU (407.497 Gm)
- Eccentricity: 0.24159
- Orbital period (sidereal): 4.50 yr (1642.1 d)
- Mean anomaly: 125.79°
- Mean motion: 0° 13^{m} 9.228^{s} / day
- Inclination: 10.963°
- Longitude of ascending node: 96.940°
- Argument of perihelion: 172.945°

Physical characteristics
- Mean diameter: 111.18±7.35 km (composite estimate); 123.57±5.4 km
- Mass: (1.99±0.39)×10^{18} kg (Note: Calculated from its standard gravitational parameter GM = 0.133±0.026 km^{3}/s^{2}.)
- Mean density: 2.27 g/cm^{3} (Note: Assuming a diameter of 119 km.)
- Synodic rotation period: 32.50 h (1.354 d)
- Geometric albedo: 0.044±0.007
- Spectral type: C
- Absolute magnitude (H): 8.30

410 Chloris is a very large main-belt asteroid that was discovered by Auguste Charlois on January 7, 1896, in Nice. It is classified as a C-type asteroid and is probably composed of primitive carbonaceous material. The spectrum of the asteroid displays evidence of aqueous alteration. It is the namesake of the Chloris family of asteroids.

Photometrics of this asteroid made in 1979 gave a light curve with a period of 32.50 hours with a brightness variation of 0.28 in magnitude.
