= 1826 Miller =

Stony main-belt asteroid

Discovery
- Discovered by: Indiana University (Indiana Asteroid Program)
- Discovery site: Goethe Link Obs.
- Discovery date: 14 September 1955

Designations
- Named after: John A. Miller (entrepreneur)
- Alternative designations: 1955 RC_{1} · 1929 RV; 1940 WF · 1950 TD_{2} 1952 BL_{1} · 1962 AA; 1971 TU_{2}
- Minor planet category: main-belt · (outer); Eos

Orbital characteristics
- Epoch 4 September 2017 (JD 2458000.5)
- Uncertainty parameter 0
- Observation arc: 75.74 yr (27,665 days)
- Aphelion: 3.2492 AU
- Perihelion: 2.7420 AU
- Semi-major axis: 2.9956 AU
- Eccentricity: 0.0847
- Orbital period (sidereal): 5.18 yr (1,894 days)
- Mean anomaly: 272.27°
- Mean motion: 0° 11^{m} 24.36^{s} / day
- Inclination: 9.2276°
- Longitude of ascending node: 274.23°
- Argument of perihelion: 163.29°

Physical characteristics
- Dimensions: 19.746±0.075 km 23.099±0.190; 24.31 km (derived); 24.41±1.9 km 26.34±0.95 km
- Synodic rotation period: 6.77±0.01 h (dated); 30.049±0.001 h
- Geometric albedo: 0.1085 (derived); 0.111±0.009; 0.1294±0.022; 0.176±0.025; 0.1964±0.0311
- Spectral type: S (assumed)
- Absolute magnitude (H): 10.90 · 11.1

1826 Miller, provisional designation 1955 RC_{1}, is a stony Eoan asteroid from the outer region of the asteroid belt, approximately 24 kilometers in diameter.

It was discovered on 14 September 1955, by the Indiana Asteroid Program at Goethe Link Observatory near Brooklyn, Indiana, United States, and named after American entrepreneur John Miller.

== Orbit and classification ==
Miller is a member of the Eos family (606), the largest asteroid family in the outer main belt consisting of nearly 10,000 asteroids.

The asteroid orbits the Sun in the outer main-belt at a distance of 2.7–3.2 AU once every 5 years and 2 months (1,894 days). Its orbit has an eccentricity of 0.08 and an inclination of 9° with respect to the ecliptic. First identified as 1929 RV at Simeis Observatory, Miller's first used observation was its identification as 1940 WF at Turku in 1940, which extends its observation arc by 15 years prior to its official discovery observation.

== Physical characteristics ==
Miller is an assumed stony S-type asteroid.

=== Rotation period ===
In March 2010, a rotational lightcurve of Miller was obtained from photometric observation taken at Oakley Southern Sky Observatory in Australia. It gave a longer-than average rotation period of 30.049 hours with a brightness variation of 0.08 magnitude (U=2), superseding a previous result of 6.77 hours by amateur astronomer René Roy, who derived it from a fragmentary lightcurve obtained in December 2002 (U=1).

=== Diameter and albedo ===
According to the surveys carried out by the Infrared Astronomical Satellite IRAS, the Japanese Akari satellite, and NASA's Wide-field Infrared Survey Explorer with its subsequent NEOWISE mission, Miller measures between 19.74 and 26.34 kilometers in diameter, and its surface has an albedo between 0.111 and 0.196. The Collaborative Asteroid Lightcurve Link derives an albedo of 0.1085 and a diameter of 24.31 kilometers with an absolute magnitude of 11.1. The asteroid was also involved in the asteroid occultation of a 10th magnitude star in the constellation Cancer in April 2004.

== Naming ==
It was named in honor of American entrepreneur John A. Miller (1872–1941), founder of the Astronomy Department at Indiana University and first director of the Kirkwood Observatory, which he built and named for his former teacher. He also built the Sproul Observatory at Swarthmore College in the U.S. state of Pennsylvania (also see 1578 Kirkwood). The official naming citation was published by the Minor Planet Center on 15 October 1977 (M.P.C. 4236).
