= Beryl H. Potter =

American astronomical researcher

- Beryl H. Potter using a blink comparator, from a 1955 newspaper.
- Born: Edna Beryl Hinkle; September 16, 1900; Goldsmith, Indiana
- Died: August 10, 1985 (aged 84); Frankfort, Indiana
- Occupation: Astronomical researcher
- Known for: Asteroid 1729 Beryl

Beryl H. Potter (September 16, 1900 – August 10, 1985), born Edna Beryl Hinkle, was an American astronomical researcher. She helped to discover asteroids and, in turn, an asteroid was named for her.

== Early life ==
Beryl Hinkle was born in Goldsmith, Indiana, the daughter of Edmond Isaac Hinkle and Blanche Adele Cross Hinkle. Her father was a doctor. She graduated from Goldsmith High School in 1917, and attended Indiana University.

== Career ==
Potter was a research assistant at Indiana Asteroid Program at Goethe Link Observatory in Indiana, from 1942 to 1965. She was assistant to astronomer Frank K. Edmondson when he discovered a dwarf star in 1944. She analyzed thousands photographic plates using a device called a blink comparator, and "contributed immensely to the program of minor planet observations". In 1952, she helped to discover the asteroid named 1578 Kirkwood. In 1955, she was part of an "all-Hoosier team" that discovered the asteroid named 1602 Indiana; "Mrs. Beryl Potter, research assistant, gets credit for the most important work, since she actually spotted the tiny planet among thousands of stars on photographic plates," explained a 1955 newspaper report. An asteroid (1729 Beryl) was officially named in her honor in 1968, by astronomer Paul Herget.

== Personal life ==
Beryl Hinkle married William N. Potter. They lived in Bloomington, Indiana, and had seven children. In 1936 she had serious health issues requiring more than a dozen blood transfusions. She moved to West Lafayette, Indiana in 1975. She died in 1985, aged 84 years, in Frankfort.
