= Hagihara =

Hagihara (written: 萩原 lit. "Japanese clover field") is a Japanese surname. Notable people with the surname include:

- Shinya Hagihara (萩原 慎也, born 1971), Japanese footballer
- Tatsuro Hagihara (萩原 達郎, born 1982), Japanese footballer
- Yusuke Hagihara (萩原 雄祐, 1897–1979), Japanese astronomer

== See also ==
- 1971 Hagihara, a main-belt asteroid
