= 2023 Asaph =

Main-belt asteroid

Discovery
- Discovered by: Indiana University (Indiana Asteroid Program)
- Discovery site: Goethe Link Obs.
- Discovery date: 16 September 1952

Designations
- Named after: Asaph Hall (American astronomer)
- Alternative designations: 1952 SA
- Minor planet category: main-belt · (outer)

Orbital characteristics
- Epoch 4 September 2017 (JD 2458000.5)
- Uncertainty parameter 0
- Observation arc: 64.53 yr (23,571 days)
- Aphelion: 3.6816 AU
- Perihelion: 2.0703 AU
- Semi-major axis: 2.8760 AU
- Eccentricity: 0.2801
- Orbital period (sidereal): 4.88 yr (1,781 days)
- Mean anomaly: 98.697°
- Mean motion: 0° 12^{m} 7.56^{s} / day
- Inclination: 22.352°
- Longitude of ascending node: 3.1290°
- Argument of perihelion: 357.53°

Physical characteristics
- Dimensions: 19.678±0.264 km 20.56±0.43 km 21.29±0.40 km 25.44 km (calculated)
- Synodic rotation period: 3.87±0.02 h (Note: Lightcurve plot of 2023 Asaph, Palmer Divide Observatory, Brian Warner (2001). The lightcurve is ambiguous with two possible period solutions of 6.28±0.05 and 3.87±0.02 hours.); 4.74±0.01 h 9.19±0.05 h
- Geometric albedo: 0.057 (assumed); 0.090±0.004; 0.096±0.018; 0.1045±0.0204
- Spectral type: C
- Absolute magnitude (H): 11.6 · 11.7

2023 Asaph, provisional designation 1952 SA, is a dark asteroid from the outer regions of the asteroid belt, approximately 21 kilometers in diameter. It was discovered on 16 September 1952, by astronomers of the Indiana Asteroid Program at Goethe Link Observatory in Indiana, United States.

== Orbit and classification ==
Asaph orbits the Sun in the outer main-belt at a distance of 2.1–3.7 AU once every 4 years and 11 months (1,781 days). Its orbit has an eccentricity of 0.28 and an inclination of 22° with respect to the ecliptic. The asteroid's observation arc begins with its official discovery observation Goethe Link.

== Physical characterization ==
In November 2001, a rotational lightcurve of Asaph was obtained from photometric observations by American astronomer Brian Warner. Lightcurve analysis gave a rotation period of 4.74 hours with a low brightness variation of 0.06 magnitude (U=2-). Upon re-examination of the revised data set, Warner constructed a new, ambiguous lightcurve with two possible period solutions of 3.87 and 6.28 hours (U=2-). These observations supersede a period of 9.19 hours derived from two fragmentary lightcurves obtained in 2001 and 2006, respectively (U=1/1).

=== Diameter and albedo ===
According to the surveys carried out by the Japanese Akari satellite and the NEOWISE mission of NASA's Wide-field Infrared Survey Explorer, Asaph measures between 19.678 and 21.29 kilometers in diameter and its surface has an albedo between 0.09 and 0.1045.

The Collaborative Asteroid Lightcurve Link assumes a standard albedo for carbonaceous asteroids of 0.057 and consequently calculates a larger diameter of 25.44 kilometers based on an absolute magnitude of 11.7.

== Naming ==
This minor planet was named in memory of American astronomer Asaph Hall (1829–1907), who discovered the Martian satellites, Phobos and Deimos. The official naming citation was published by the Minor Planet Center on 15 October 1977 (M.P.C. 4238).
