= 1615 Bardwell =

Rare-type main-belt asteroid

Discovery
- Discovered by: Indiana University (Indiana Asteroid Program)
- Discovery site: Goethe Link Obs.
- Discovery date: 28 January 1950

Designations
- Named after: Conrad Bardwell (astronomer)
- Alternative designations: 1950 BW · 1926 TO; 1937 TJ · 1948 RB_{1} 1948 RH_{1} · 1948 TG
- Minor planet category: main-belt · Themis

Orbital characteristics
- Epoch 4 September 2017 (JD 2458000.5)
- Uncertainty parameter 0
- Observation arc: 90.49 yr (33,053 days)
- Aphelion: 3.6887 AU
- Perihelion: 2.5664 AU
- Semi-major axis: 3.1275 AU
- Eccentricity: 0.1794
- Orbital period (sidereal): 5.53 yr (2,020 days)
- Mean anomaly: 169.71°
- Mean motion: 0° 10^{m} 41.52^{s} / day
- Inclination: 1.6901°
- Longitude of ascending node: 152.55°
- Argument of perihelion: 252.97°

Physical characteristics
- Dimensions: 21.92±5.97 km 25.01±1.49 km 27.78±1.6 km (IRAS:5); 28.8±2.9 km 29.139±0.148 km 31±3 km 31.579±0.250 km
- Synodic rotation period: 18 h (Note: Tedesco, E.F. (1979) PhD Dissertation, New. Mex. State Univ. 280pp.; Rotation period of 18 hours with a brightness amplitude of 0.2. Summary figures at Asteroid Lightcurve Database for (1615) Bardwell)
- Geometric albedo: 0.0497±0.0192; 0.05±0.01; 0.060±0.010; 0.0642±0.008 (IRAS:5); 0.079±0.015; 0.09±0.06
- Spectral type: Tholen = B · B B–V = 0.692; U–B = 0.329
- Absolute magnitude (H): 11.38 · 11.46

1615 Bardwell, provisional designation 1950 BW, is a rare-type Themistian asteroid from the outer region of the asteroid belt, approximately 27 kilometers in diameter. It was discovered on 28 January 1950, by IU's Indiana Asteroid Program at Goethe Link Observatory near Brooklyn, Indiana, United States. It is named for American astronomer Conrad Bardwell.

== Orbit and classification ==
Bardwell is a member of the Themis family, a dynamical family of outer-belt asteroids with nearly coplanar ecliptical orbits. It orbits the Sun at a distance of 2.6–3.7 AU once every 5 years and 6 months (2,020 days). Its orbit has an eccentricity of 0.18 and an inclination of 2° with respect to the ecliptic.

Its orbit has an eccentricity of 0.18 and an inclination of 2° with respect to the ecliptic. It was first identified as 1926 TO at Simeiz Observatory in 1926, extending the body's observation arc by 24 years prior to its official discovery observation.

== Naming ==
This minor planet was named for Conrad M. Bardwell (1926–2010), who was a research associate at the Cincinnati Observatory and later associate director of the Minor Planet Center in Cambridge, Massachusetts, United States. Bardwell successfully established numerous identifications from observations in widely separated oppositions and provided observers with reliable data of orbital elements. The official naming citation was published by the Minor Planet Center on 15 June 1974 (M.P.C. 3643).

== Physical characteristics ==
In the Tholen taxonomy, Bardwell is a blueish B-type asteroid, a rare subtype of the abundant carbonaceous C-types found in the outer belt. The spectra of B-type bodies show a broad absorption feature at one micron wavelength that is associated with the presence of magnetite and is what gives the asteroid its blue tint. There are only a few dozens asteroids of this type known to exist.

=== Rotation period ===
In the late 1970s, a rotational lightcurve of Bardwell was obtained by American astronomer Edward Tedesco. It gave a provisional rotation period of 18 hours with a change in brightness of 0.2 magnitude (U=1). As of 2017, no other photometric analysis of Bardwell has been made.

=== Diameter and albedo ===
According to the surveys carried out by the Infrared Astronomical Satellite IRAS and NASA's Wide-field Infrared Survey Explorer with its subsequent NEOWISE mission, Bardwell measures between 21.92 and 31.58 kilometers in diameter, and its surface has an albedo between 0.049 and 0.09. The Collaborative Asteroid Lightcurve Link agrees with the results obtained by IRAS, that is, an albedo of 0.0642 and a diameter of 27.78 kilometers based on an absolute magnitude of 11.38.
