= 1824 Haworth =

Main-belt asteroid

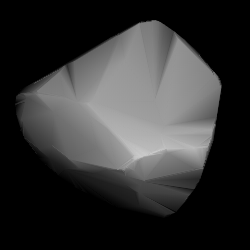
- Shape model of Haworth from its lightcurve

Discovery
- Discovered by: Indiana University (Indiana Asteroid Program)
- Discovery site: Goethe Link Obs.
- Discovery date: 30 March 1952

Designations
- Named after: Leland J. Haworth (American physicist)
- Alternative designations: 1952 FM · 1942 GC; 1951 CA · 1952 HW; 1957 HQ · 1957 LA; 1974 XA
- Minor planet category: main-belt · (outer)

Orbital characteristics
- Epoch 4 September 2017 (JD 2458000.5)
- Uncertainty parameter 0
- Observation arc: 110.25 yr (40,268 days)
- Aphelion: 3.0071 AU
- Perihelion: 2.7603 AU
- Semi-major axis: 2.8837 AU
- Eccentricity: 0.0428
- Orbital period (sidereal): 4.90 yr (1,789 days)
- Mean anomaly: 245.95°
- Mean motion: 0° 12^{m} 4.68^{s} / day
- Inclination: 1.9299°
- Longitude of ascending node: 15.034°
- Argument of perihelion: 69.949°

Physical characteristics
- Dimensions: 14.169±0.197 km
- Geometric albedo: 0.266±0.045
- Absolute magnitude (H): 11.4

1824 Haworth (prov. designation: 1952 FM) is an asteroid from the outer region of the asteroid belt, approximately 14 kilometers in diameter. It was discovered on 30 March 1952, by Indiana University's Indiana Asteroid Program at its Goethe Link Observatory near Brooklyn, Indiana, United States, and named after physicist Leland John Haworth.

== Orbit and classification ==
Haworth orbits the Sun in the outer main-belt at a distance of 2.8–3.0 AU once every 4 years and 11 months (1,789 days). Its orbit has an eccentricity of 0.04 and an inclination of 2° with respect to the ecliptic.

Its first precovery was taken at Lowell Observatory in 1906, extending the body's observation arc by 46 years prior to its official discovery observation at Goethe Link.

== Naming ==
It was named in honor of American particle physicist Leland John Haworth (1904–1979), a graduate of Indiana University and second director of the National Science Foundation.

His long and varied career included teaching and serving as member of the Atomic Energy Commission, as vice-president and president of Associated Universities, Inc., and as director of the Brookhaven National Laboratory. His negotiations were instrumental for the funding of a 4-meter telescope at the Cerro Tololo Interamerican Observatory. The official naming citation was published by the Minor Planet Center on 18 April 1977 (M.P.C. 4156).

== Physical characteristics ==
According to the survey carried out by NASA's Wide-field Infrared Survey Explorer with its subsequent NEOWISE mission, Haworth measures 14.17 kilometers in diameter and its surface has an albedo of 0.266. As of 2017, its composition, rotation period and shape remain unknown.
