= 1762 Russell =

Main-belt asteroid

Discovery
- Discovered by: Indiana University (Indiana Asteroid Program)
- Discovery site: Goethe Link Obs.
- Discovery date: 8 October 1953

Designations
- Named after: Henry Norris Russell (American astronomer)
- Alternative designations: 1953 TZ · 1947 LM; 1953 TW_{2} · 1956 GF; 1963 VN
- Minor planet category: main-belt · (outer); Koronis

Orbital characteristics
- Epoch 4 September 2017 (JD 2458000.5)
- Uncertainty parameter 0
- Observation arc: 69.52 yr (25,393 days)
- Aphelion: 3.0998 AU
- Perihelion: 2.6514 AU
- Semi-major axis: 2.8756 AU
- Eccentricity: 0.0780
- Orbital period (sidereal): 4.88 yr (1,781 days)
- Mean anomaly: 21.771°
- Mean motion: 0° 12^{m} 7.56^{s} / day
- Inclination: 2.2793°
- Longitude of ascending node: 160.64°
- Argument of perihelion: 233.54°

Physical characteristics
- Dimensions: 15.61 km (calculated); 16.576±0.195 km 16.93±0.97 km 17.03±0.21 km 17.033±0.209 km
- Synodic rotation period: 12.797±0.007 h
- Geometric albedo: 0.118±0.015; 0.1227±0.0369; 0.201±0.022; 0.24 (assumed)
- Spectral type: S
- Absolute magnitude (H): 11.20 · 11.69±0.12 · 11.80

1762 Russell, provisional designation 1953 TZ, is a stony Koronian asteroid from the outer regions of the asteroid belt, approximately 16 kilometers in diameter. It was discovered by the Indiana Asteroid Program at Goethe Link Observatory near Brooklyn, Indiana, on 8 October 1953. The asteroid was named after American astronomer Henry Norris Russell.

== Orbit and classification ==
Russell is a member of the Koronis family (605), a very large outer asteroid family with nearly co-planar ecliptical orbits. It orbits the Sun in the outer main-belt at a distance of 2.7–3.1 AU once every 4 years and 11 months (1,781 days). Its orbit has an eccentricity of 0.08 and an inclination of 2° with respect to the ecliptic.

The asteroid was first identified as 1947 LM at Lowell Observatory in June 1947. The body's observation arc begins with a precovery at Goethe Link Observatory in February 1950, more than 3 years prior to its official discovery observation.

== Physical characteristics ==
Russell is an assumed stony S-type asteroid, which agrees with the overall spectral type of the Koronis family.

=== Rotation period ===
In April 2014, a rotational lightcurve of Russell was obtained from photometric observations at the Sonoita Research Observatory (G93) and Etscorn Campus Observatory (719). Lightcurve analysis gave a rotation period of 12.797 hours with a brightness variation of 0.46 magnitude (U=3-).

=== Diameter and albedo ===
According to the surveys carried out by the Japanese Akari satellite and the NEOWISE mission of NASA's Wide-field Infrared Survey Explorer, Russell measures between 16.576 and 17.033 kilometers in diameter and its surface has an albedo between 0.118 and 0.201.

The Collaborative Asteroid Lightcurve Link assumes an albedo of 0.24 and calculates a diameter of 15.61 kilometers based on an absolute magnitude of 11.2.

== Naming ==
This minor planet was named after distinguished American astronomer Henry Norris Russell (1877–1957), noted for the H–R diagram and research on a variety of topics in fundamental astronomy, astrophysics, and the analysis of atomic spectra (see Russell–Saunders coupling).

The official naming citation was published by the Minor Planet Center on 20 February 1971 (M.P.C. 3143). Russell is also honored by both a lunar and a Martian crater.
