= 2227 Otto Struve =

Main-belt asteroid

Discovery
- Discovered by: Indiana University (Indiana Asteroid Program)
- Discovery site: Goethe Link Obs.
- Discovery date: 13 September 1955

Designations
- Named after: Otto Struve (Russian astronomer)
- Alternative designations: 1955 RX · 1935 UP; 1955 SA_{2} · 1962 WL_{2} 1965 SV · 1970 ET_{2}
- Minor planet category: main-belt · (inner)

Orbital characteristics
- Epoch 4 September 2017 (JD 2458000.5)
- Uncertainty parameter 0
- Observation arc: 81.54 yr (29,781 days)
- Aphelion: 2.6265 AU
- Perihelion: 1.8468 AU
- Semi-major axis: 2.2366 AU
- Eccentricity: 0.1743
- Orbital period (sidereal): 3.35 yr (1,222 days)
- Mean anomaly: 140.74°
- Mean motion: 0° 17^{m} 40.92^{s} / day
- Inclination: 4.9496°
- Longitude of ascending node: 178.90°
- Argument of perihelion: 254.10°

Physical characteristics
- Dimensions: 4.668±0.071; 9±4 (generic)
- Geometric albedo: 0.388±0.112
- Absolute magnitude (H): 13.4

2227 Otto Struve, provisional designation 1955 RX, is an asteroid from the inner regions of the asteroid belt, approximately 4.7 kilometers in diameter. The asteroid was discovered on 13 September 1955, by the Indiana Asteroid Program at Goethe Link Observatory near Brooklyn, Indiana, United States. It was named after Russian astronomer Otto Struve.

== Orbit and classification ==
The asteroid orbits the Sun in the inner main-belt at a distance of 1.8–2.6 AU once every 3 years and 4 months (1,222 days). Its orbit has an eccentricity of 0.17 and an inclination of 5° with respect to the ecliptic. It was first identified as 1935 UP at the Johannesburg Observatory in 1935, extending the body's observation arc by 20 years prior to its official discovery observation.

== Physical characteristics ==
As of 2016, the asteroid's composition, rotation period and shape remain unknown. According to the surveys carried out by NASA's Wide-field Infrared Survey Explorer with its subsequent NEOWISE mission, the asteroid measures 4.7 kilometers in diameter and its surface has an albedo of 0.388. Based on its absolute magnitude of 13.4, it has an estimated diameter between 5 and 13 kilometers, assuming an albedo in the range of 0.05 to 0.25. Since most asteroids in the inner main-belt are of a silicaceous rather than of a carbonaceous composition, with higheralbedos, typically around 0.20, the asteroid's diameter might be on the lower end of NASA's published conversion table, as the higher the reflectivity (albedo), the smaller the body's diameter at a constant intrinsic brightness (absolute magnitude).

== Naming ==
The minor planet is named in memory of Russian astronomer Otto Struve (1897–1963), discoverer of the two asteroids 991 McDonalda and 992 Swasey, and last of a remarkable dynasty of astronomers: the Struve family.

His great-grandfather, Wilhelm Struve (also see 768 Struveana), founded the Pulkovo Observatory near St. Petersburg in 1839; his grandfather (Otto Wilhelm), uncle (Hermann) and father (Ludwig) were also distinguished astronomers. Following a period of great privation and misery after World War I, Otto was invited by Edwin B. Frost (also see 854 Frostia) to come to the U.S. Yerkes Observatory in 1921. He started working in spectroscopy and remained a spectroscopist to the end of his days. He succeeded Frost as Yerkes director in 1932 and was the major force responsible for the establishment of the Texan McDonald Observatory in 1933. Managing editor of the Astrophysical Journal from 1932 to 1947 and became head of the astronomy department of the University of California, Berkeley in 1950. He received the Gold Medal of the Royal Astronomical Society in 1944, and the Bruce Medal in 1948. The lunar crater Struve was also named in his honor. The official naming citation was published by the Minor Planet Center on 13 July 1984 (M.P.C. 8911/8912).
