= 1988 Delores =

Stony main-belt asteroid

Discovery
- Discovered by: Indiana University (Indiana Asteroid Program)
- Discovery site: Goethe Link Obs.
- Discovery date: 28 September 1952

Designations
- Named after: Delores Owings (Indiana University)
- Alternative designations: 1952 SV · 1951 GF_{1} 1952 UU · 1971 UE; 1973 GH
- Minor planet category: main-belt · Flora

Orbital characteristics
- Epoch 4 September 2017 (JD 2458000.5)
- Uncertainty parameter 0
- Observation arc: 64.59 yr (23,591 days)
- Aphelion: 2.3749 AU
- Perihelion: 1.9336 AU
- Semi-major axis: 2.1543 AU
- Eccentricity: 0.1024
- Orbital period (sidereal): 3.16 yr (1,155 days)
- Mean anomaly: 226.97°
- Mean motion: 0° 18^{m} 42.12^{s} / day
- Inclination: 4.2519°
- Longitude of ascending node: 106.38°
- Argument of perihelion: 235.01°

Physical characteristics
- Dimensions: 4.60 km (calculated); 5.761±0.035 km 5.818±0.097 km
- Synodic rotation period: 88.1521±0.3555 h
- Geometric albedo: 0.1895±0.0252; 0.193±0.024; 0.24 (assumed)
- Spectral type: S
- Absolute magnitude (H): 13.401±0.002 (R) · 13.6 · 13.85

1988 Delores, provisional designation 1952 SV, is a stony Florian asteroid from the inner regions of the asteroid belt, approximately 5 kilometers in diameter.

It was discovered on 28 September 1952, by IU's Indiana Asteroid Program at the Goethe Link Observatory near Brooklyn, Indiana, United States, and named after Delores Owings, a member of the program.

== Classification and orbit ==
Delores is a stony S-type asteroid and member of the Flora family, one of the largest groups of stony asteroids in the main-belt. It orbits the Sun in the inner main-belt at a distance of 1.9–2.4 AU once every 3 years and 2 months (1,155 days).

Its orbit has an eccentricity of 0.10 and an inclination of 4° with respect to the ecliptic. It was first observed as 1951 GF_{1} at the McDonald Observatory in April 1951, yet the astrometric data from this observation remained unused to extend the body's observation arc prior to its official discovery.

== Physical characteristics ==
=== Rotation period ===
A rotational lightcurve of Delores was obtained at the Palomar Transient Factory in October 2012. It gave a rotation period of 88 hours and a brightness variation of 0.74 magnitude (U=2).

While not being a slow rotator, a period of 88 hours is significantly above average, as most minor planets rotate once every 2–20 hours around their axis. It has also a high brightness amplitude, which typically indicates that the body has a non-spheroidal shape.

=== Diameter and albedo ===
According to the survey carried out by NASA's Wide-field Infrared Survey Explorer with its subsequent NEOWISE mission, Delores measures 5.8 kilometers in diameter and its surface has an albedo of 0.19, while the Collaborative Asteroid Lightcurve Link assumes an albedo of 0.24 — derived from 8 Flora, the family's largest member and namesake – and calculates a diameter of 4.6 kilometers with an absolute magnitude of 13.85.

== Naming ==
This minor planet was named after Delores Owings, member in the Indiana Asteroid Program of Indiana University, collaborator with Tom Gehrels on the determination of absolute magnitudes of minor planets, who became the program's supervisor of astrometric measurements on photographic plates. The naming was suggested by Paul Herget, the then director of the Minor Planet Center (MPC). The official naming citation was published by the Minor Planet Center on 30 June 1977 (M.P.C. 4190).
