= 1764 Cogshall =

Carbonaceous Themistian asteroid

Discovery
- Discovered by: Indiana University (Indiana Asteroid Program)
- Discovery site: Goethe Link Obs.
- Discovery date: 7 November 1953

Designations
- Named after: Wilbur A. Cogshall (professor of astronomy at IU)
- Alternative designations: 1953 VM_{1} · 1935 MF; 1939 CC · 1942 VB; 1951 LC · 1952 SM; 1953 XJ · 1964 XG; 1967 GO · 1969 TN_{2}
- Minor planet category: main-belt · (outer); Themis

Orbital characteristics
- Epoch 4 September 2017 (JD 2458000.5)
- Uncertainty parameter 0
- Observation arc: 82.02 yr (29,956 days)
- Aphelion: 3.4671 AU
- Perihelion: 2.7193 AU
- Semi-major axis: 3.0932 AU
- Eccentricity: 0.1209
- Orbital period (sidereal): 5.44 yr (1,987 days)
- Mean anomaly: 84.951°
- Mean motion: 0° 10^{m} 52.32^{s} / day
- Inclination: 2.2355°
- Longitude of ascending node: 152.23°
- Argument of perihelion: 79.719°

Physical characteristics
- Dimensions: 25.14±0.64 km 26.13 km (derived); 26.21±2.0 km 26.970±0.232 km 29.671±0.179 km
- Synodic rotation period: 3.624±0.0052 h (R); 3.62417±0.00007 h 3.630±0.0052 h (S)
- Geometric albedo: 0.0606±0.0086; 0.0712 (derived); 0.0852±0.015; 0.094±0.005; 0.109±0.010
- Spectral type: S/C (generically assumed)
- Absolute magnitude (H): 11.20 · 11.248±0.002 (R) · 11.3 · 11.4

1764 Cogshall, provisional designation 1953 VM_{1}, is a carbonaceous Themistian asteroid from the outer regions of the asteroid belt, approximately 26 kilometers in diameter. It was discovered on 7 November 1953 by astronomers of the Indiana Asteroid Program at Goethe Link Observatory in Indiana, United States. The asteroid was named after Wilbur Cogshall, professor of astronomy at Indiana University.

== Orbit and classification ==
Cogshall is a Themistian asteroid that belongs to the Themis family (602), a very large family of carbonaceous asteroids named after 24 Themis. It orbits the Sun in the outer main belt at a distance of 2.7–3.5 AU once every 5 years and 5 months (1,987 days). Its orbit has an eccentricity of 0.12 and an inclination of 2° concerning to the ecliptic.

The asteroid was first identified as 1935 MF at Johannesburg Observatory in June 1935. The body's observation arc begins with its identification as 1939 CC at Turku Observatory in February 1939, more than 14 years before its official discovery observation at Goethe Link.

== Physical characteristics ==
=== Rotation period ===
In May 2005, French amateur astronomer Pierre Antonini obtained a rotational lightcurve of Cogshall from photometric observations. Lightcurve analysis gave a well-defined rotation period of 3.62417 hours with a brightness variation of 0.21 magnitude (U=3).

Observations at the Palomar Transient Factory in 2012 gave a concurring period of 3.624 and 3.630 hours with an amplitude of 0.22 and 0.20 magnitude in the R- and S-band, respectively (U=2/2).

=== Diameter and albedo ===
According to the surveys carried out by the Infrared Astronomical Satellite IRAS, the Japanese Akari satellite, and the NEOWISE mission of NASA's Wide-field Infrared Survey Explorer, Cogshall measures between 25.14 and 29.671 kilometers in diameter, and its surface has an albedo between 0.0606 and 0.109.

The Collaborative Asteroid Lightcurve Link derives an albedo of 0.0712 and a diameter of 26.13 kilometers based on an absolute magnitude of 11.4.

== Naming ==
This minor planet was named after American astronomer Wilbur A. Cogshall, a professor of astronomy at Indiana University and director of the Kirkwood Observatory for more than four decades (1900–1944). His research included visual binary stars and the photography of solar eclipses. The name was proposed by Frank K. Edmondson, who initiated the Indiana Asteroid Program. The Minor Planet Center published the official naming citation on 20 February 1971 (M.P.C. 3143).
