= 1799 Koussevitzky =

Main-belt asteroid

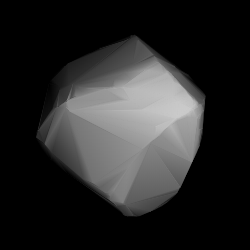
- Koussevitzky modeled from its lightcurve

Discovery
- Discovered by: Indiana University (Indiana Asteroid Program)
- Discovery site: Goethe Link Obs.
- Discovery date: 25 July 1950

Designations
- Named after: Serge Koussevitzky (Russian conductor)
- Alternative designations: 1950 OE · 1929 QD; 1974 CF_{1}
- Minor planet category: main-belt · (outer); Eos · background

Orbital characteristics
- Epoch 27 April 2019 (JD 2458600.5)
- Uncertainty parameter 0
- Observation arc: 68.24 yr (24,926 d)
- Aphelion: 3.3845 AU
- Perihelion: 2.6690 AU
- Semi-major axis: 3.0267 AU
- Eccentricity: 0.1182
- Orbital period (sidereal): 5.27 yr (1,923 d)
- Mean anomaly: 359.04°
- Mean motion: 0° 11^{m} 13.92^{s} / day
- Inclination: 11.489°
- Longitude of ascending node: 156.61°
- Argument of perihelion: 193.02°

Physical characteristics
- Mean diameter: 17.88±1.23 km 18.196±0.156 km 19.067±0.298 km 23.26±2.4 km
- Synodic rotation period: 6.318±0.005 h (Note: Lightcurve plot of (1799) Koussevitzky, B. Warner, June 2013, rotation period 6.318±0.005 hours with a brightness amplitude of 0.4 mag. Quality code is 3 (at CS3). Summary figures at the LCDB and CS3.)
- Geometric albedo: 0.1426; 0.2128; 0.233; 0.241
- Spectral type: SMASS = K · L
- Absolute magnitude (H): 10.90; 11.3; 11.59±0.29

1799 Koussevitzky (prov. designation: 1950 OE) is an asteroid of the Eos family from the outer regions of the asteroid belt, approximately 18 kilometers (11 miles) in diameter. It was discovered on 25 July 1950, by astronomers at Indiana University during the Indiana Asteroid Program at Goethe Link Observatory in Indiana, United States. The K-type asteroid has a rotation period of 6.3 hours. It was named for Russian conductor Serge Koussevitzky.

== Orbit and classification ==
According to several HCM-analyses by Zappalà, Mothé-Diniz, as well as Milani and Knežević, Koussevitzky is a core member the Eos family (606), the largest asteroid family of the outer main belt consisting of nearly 10,000 asteroids. However, in a more recent HCM-analysis by Nesvorný, Koussevitzky is a non-family asteroid from the main belt's background population.

It orbits the Sun in the outer asteroid belt at a distance of 2.7–3.4 AU once every 5 years and 3 months (1,923 days; semi-major axis of 3.03 AU). Its orbit has an eccentricity of 0.12 and an inclination of 11° with respect to the ecliptic. The asteroid was first observed as 1929 QD at Simeiz Observatory in August 1929. The body's observation arc begins with its official discovery observation at Goethe Link in July 1950.

== Naming ==
This minor planet was named in memory of Russian-born Serge Koussevitzky (1874–1951), long-time music director and conductor of the Boston Symphony Orchestra. The asteroid's name was proposed by astronomer Frank K. Edmondson of Indiana University on the occasion of Serge Koussevitzky's centenary of the birth on 26 July 1974. The official naming citation was published by the Minor Planet Center on 1 January 1974 (M.P.C. 3569).

== Physical characteristics ==
In the SMASS classification, Koussevitzky is a stony K-type asteroid, typical for members of the Eos family. The asteroid has also been characterized as an L-type by Pan-STARRS.

=== Rotation period ===
In June 2013, a rotational lightcurve of Koussevitzky was obtained from photometric observations by Brian Warner at the Palmer Divide Station (U82) in California. Lightcurve analysis gave a well-defined rotation period of 6.318±0.005 hours with a brightness variation of 0.40 magnitude (U=3). Alternative period determinations of 6.325, 6.328 and 6.329 hours were made by astronomers at the University of Iowa using its Rigel Telescope at the Iowa Robotic Observatory (857) in Arizona, by French amateur astronomer René Roy, and by staff members of the Palomar Transient Factory in California, respectively (U=x2/3-/2).

=== Diameter and albedo ===
According to the surveys carried out by the Infrared Astronomical Satellite IRAS, the Japanese Akari satellite and the NEOWISE mission of NASA's Wide-field Infrared Survey Explorer, Koussevitzky measures between 17.88 and 23.26 kilometers in diameter and its surface has an albedo between 0.1426 and 0.241. The Collaborative Asteroid Lightcurve Link derives an albedo of 0.1506 and a diameter of 18.82 kilometers based on an absolute magnitude of 11.3.
