= 1765 Wrubel =

Dark background asteroid

Discovery
- Discovered by: Indiana University (Indiana Asteroid Program)
- Discovery site: Goethe Link Obs.
- Discovery date: 15 December 1957

Designations
- Named after: Marshal Henry Wrubel (astronomy professor at IU)
- Alternative designations: 1957 XB · 1938 JB; 1945 VA · 1949 HK_{1} 1951 XB_{1} · 1955 KQ; 1966 KA · A906 XA; A917 XA
- Minor planet category: main-belt · (outer)

Orbital characteristics
- Epoch 4 September 2017 (JD 2458000.5)
- Uncertainty parameter 0
- Observation arc: 99.58 yr (36,371 days)
- Aphelion: 3.7354 AU
- Perihelion: 2.6127 AU
- Semi-major axis: 3.1741 AU
- Eccentricity: 0.1769
- Orbital period (sidereal): 5.65 yr (2,065 days)
- Mean anomaly: 314.43°
- Mean motion: 0° 10^{m} 27.48^{s} / day
- Inclination: 19.945°
- Longitude of ascending node: 70.185°
- Argument of perihelion: 265.28°

Physical characteristics
- Dimensions: 37.704±0.731 km 38.299±0.226 km 42.20±0.48 km 42.33 km (SIMPS)
- Synodic rotation period: 5.260±0.002 h (Note: Mazzone (2012) web. Observationy: 2012-07-16. Rotation period 5.260±0.002 hours with a brightness amplitude of 0.33±0.03 mag. Quality code of 3. Summary figures for (1765) Wrubel at Collaborative Asteroid Lightcurve Link (CALL))
- Geometric albedo: 0.1061 (SIMPS); 0.113±0.003; 0.130±0.029; 0.1360±0.0153
- Spectral type: Tholen = DX; B–V = 0.750; U–B = 0.270
- Absolute magnitude (H): 9.92 · 10.06±0.12

1765 Wrubel, provisional designation 1957 XB, is a dark background asteroid from the outer regions of the asteroid belt, approximately 40 kilometers in diameter. It was discovered on 15 December 1957, by astronomers of the Indiana Asteroid Program at Goethe Link Observatory in Indiana, United States. The asteroid was named after Marshal Henry Wrubel, professor at Indiana University.

== Orbit and classification ==
Wrubel is a background asteroid that does not belong to any known asteroid family. It orbits the Sun in the outer main-belt at a distance of 2.6–3.7 AU once every 5 years and 8 months (2,065 days). Its orbit has an eccentricity of 0.18 and an inclination of 20° with respect to the ecliptic.

The asteroid was first identified as A906 XA at Lowell Observatory in December 1906. The body's observation arc begins with its identification as A917 XA at Heidelberg Observatory in December 1917, almost 40 years prior to its official discovery observation at Goethe Link.

== Physical characteristics ==
Wrubel is a dark, carbonaceous asteroid. In the Tholen classification, its spectral type is ambiguous. Based on a numerical color analysis, it is closest to the dark D-type asteroid with some resemblance to the X-type asteroids (which encompass the primitive P-types).

=== Rotation period ===
In July 2012, a rotational lightcurve of Wrubel was obtained from photometric observations. Lightcurve analysis gave a well-defined rotation period of 5.260 hours with a brightness amplitude of 0.33 magnitude (U=3).

=== Diameter and albedo ===
According to the surveys carried out by the Japanese Akari satellite and the NEOWISE mission of NASA's Wide-field Infrared Survey Explorer, Wrubel measures between 37.704 and 42.20 kilometers in diameter and its surface has an albedo between 0.113 and 0.1360.

The Collaborative Asteroid Lightcurve Link adopt the results obtained by the Infrared Astronomical Satellite IRAS, that is, an albedo of 0.1061 and a diameter of 42.33 kilometers with an absolute magnitude of 9.92.

== Naming ==
This minor planet was named after Marshal Henry Wrubel (1924–1968), professor of astronomy and faculty member at Indiana University, who was co-founder of the Indiana University Research Computing Center pioneering the use of high speed computers for astrophysical computations.

The name was proposed by Frank K. Edmondson, who initiated the Indiana Asteroid Program. The official naming citation was published by the Minor Planet Center on 20 February 1971 (M.P.C. 3143).
