= 2065 Spicer =

Main-belt asteroid

Discovery
- Discovered by: Indiana University (Indiana Asteroid Program)
- Discovery site: Goethe Link Obs.
- Discovery date: 9 September 1959

Designations
- Named after: Edward H. Spicer (American anthropologist)
- Alternative designations: 1959 RN · 1952 BS_{1} 1955 XC · 1968 QX; 1973 YR_{2}
- Minor planet category: main-belt · (middle)

Orbital characteristics
- Epoch 4 September 2017 (JD 2458000.5)
- Uncertainty parameter 0
- Observation arc: 60.34 yr (22,038 days)
- Aphelion: 3.3313 AU
- Perihelion: 2.0659 AU
- Semi-major axis: 2.6986 AU
- Eccentricity: 0.2345
- Orbital period (sidereal): 4.43 yr (1,619 days)
- Mean anomaly: 350.70°
- Mean motion: 0° 13^{m} 20.28^{s} / day
- Inclination: 6.4348°
- Longitude of ascending node: 328.09°
- Argument of perihelion: 66.381°

Physical characteristics
- Dimensions: 16.721±0.088 km 18.43 km (calculated)
- Synodic rotation period: 18.165±0.005 h (Note: Lightcurve plot of 2065 Spicer from the Palmer Divide Observatory, B. D. Warner (2005))
- Geometric albedo: 0.057 (assumed); 0.062±0.007
- Spectral type: SMASS = Xc · P · X
- Absolute magnitude (H): 12.03±0.23 · 12.2 · 12.4

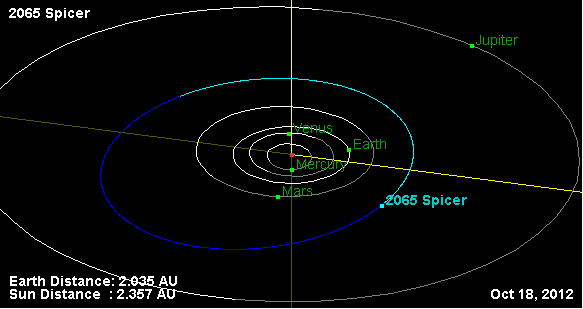
Orbit of asteroid 2065

2065 Spicer, provisional designation 1959 RN, is a dark and eccentric asteroid from the middle region of the asteroid belt, approximately 17 kilometers in diameter.

The asteroid was discovered on 9 September 1959, by the Indiana Asteroid Program at Goethe Link Observatory near Brooklyn, Indiana, United States, and named after American anthropologist Edward H. Spicer.

== Orbit and classification ==
Spicer orbits the Sun in the central main-belt at a distance of 2.1–3.3 AU once every 4 years and 5 months (1,619 days). Its orbit has an eccentricity of 0.23 and an inclination of 6° with respect to the ecliptic.

== Physical characteristics ==
Spicer's spectra is that of an X-type and Xc-type in SMASS classification scheme, which indicates a transitional stage to the carbonaceous C-type asteroid. It has also been characterized as a P-type asteroid by the NEOWISE mission.

=== Photometry ===
In January 2005, photometric measurements of Spicer made by American astronomer Brian Warner at the Palmer Divide Observatory (716) gave a lightcurve with a well-defined rotation period of 18.165±0.005 hours and a brightness variation of 1.0±0.03 magnitude (U=3).

=== Diameter and albedo ===
According to the survey carried out by NASA's Wide-field Infrared Survey Explorer with its subsequent NEOWISE mission, Spicer measures 16.721 kilometers in diameter and its surface has an albedo of 0.062, while the Collaborative Asteroid Lightcurve Link assumes a standard albedo for carbonaceous asteroids of 0.057 and calculates a diameter of 18.43 kilometers with an absolute magnitude of 12.4.

== Naming ==
This minor planet was named after American anthropologist Edward H. Spicer (1906–1983), professor at the University of Arizona, and a former president of the American Anthropological Association.

In 1955, Spicer's negotiations with the local district and tribal councils were instrumental for receiving permission to evaluate the location where the Kitt Peak National Observatory was later built. The official naming citation was published by the Minor Planet Center on 26 May 1983 (M.P.C. 7944).
