= 1822 Waterman =

Stony main-belt asteroid

Discovery
- Discovered by: Indiana University (Indiana Asteroid Program)
- Discovery site: Goethe Link Obs.
- Discovery date: 25 July 1950

Designations
- Named after: Alan T. Waterman (American physicist)
- Alternative designations: 1950 OO · 1943 EB; 1953 MA · 1963 TT
- Minor planet category: main-belt · (inner)

Orbital characteristics
- Epoch 4 September 2017 (JD 2458000.5)
- Uncertainty parameter 0
- Observation arc: 66.64 yr (24,342 days)
- Aphelion: 2.5023 AU
- Perihelion: 1.8378 AU
- Semi-major axis: 2.1700 AU
- Eccentricity: 0.1531
- Orbital period (sidereal): 3.20 yr (1,168 days)
- Mean anomaly: 45.052°
- Inclination: 0.9567°
- Longitude of ascending node: 221.25°
- Argument of perihelion: 30.351°

Physical characteristics
- Dimensions: 6.054±0.098; 6.515±0.060 km 7.46 km (calculated)
- Synodic rotation period: 7.581±0.002 h
- Geometric albedo: 0.20 (assumed); 0.2639±0.0659; 0.325±0.046
- Spectral type: S
- Absolute magnitude (H): 13.0 · 13.1 · 14.04±0.51

1822 Waterman, provisional designation 1950 OO, is a stony asteroid from the inner regions of the asteroid belt, approximately 6.5 kilometers in diameter.

It was discovered on 25 July 1950, by Indiana University's Indiana Asteroid Program at its Goethe Link Observatory near Brooklyn, Indiana, United States. The asteroid was named after American physicist Alan T. Waterman.

== Orbit and classification ==
Waterman is a S-type asteroid. It orbits the Sun in the inner main-belt at a distance of 1.8–2.5 AU once every 3 years and 2 months (1,168 days). Its orbit has an eccentricity of 0.15 and an inclination of 1° with respect to the ecliptic. The body's observation arc begins with its official discovery observation, as its first identification, 1943 EB, made at the German Sonneberg Observatory in 1943, remained unused.

== Physical characteristics ==
=== Rotation period ===
In January 2013, a rotational lightcurve of Waterman was obtained from photometric observation taken at the U.S Etscorn Observatory in New Mexico. It gave a well-defined rotation period of 7.581 hours with a brightness variation of 0.51 magnitude (U=3).

=== Diameter and albedo ===
According to the survey carried out by NASA's Wide-field Infrared Survey Explorer with its subsequent NEOWISE mission, Waterman measures between 6.06 and 6.52 kilometers in diameter, and its surface has an albedo between 0.264 and 0.325. The Collaborative Asteroid Lightcurve Link assumes a standard albedo for stony asteroids of 0.20 and calculates a diameter of 7.46 kilometers with an absolute magnitude of 13.1.

== Naming ==
This minor planet was named in honor of American physicist Alan Tower Waterman (1892–1967), who was the first director of the U.S. National Science Foundation. He went to Washington to serve with OSRD (1941–45), ONR (1946–51), and NSF (1951–63), after being an academic physicist for 25 years.

Waterman was awarded the Karl Taylor Compton Gold Medal for distinguished statesmanship in science, the Public Welfare Medal and the Presidential Medal of Freedom. The official naming citation was published by the Minor Planet Center on 1 June 1975 (M.P.C. 3825).
