= 1853 McElroy =

Main-belt asteroid

Discovery
- Discovered by: Indiana University (Indiana Asteroid Program)
- Discovery site: Goethe Link Obs.
- Discovery date: 15 December 1957

Designations
- Named after: William D. McElroy (American biochemist)
- Alternative designations: 1957 XE · 1930 YP; 1950 NX · 1950 OM
- Minor planet category: main-belt · (outer)

Orbital characteristics
- Epoch 4 September 2017 (JD 2458000.5)
- Uncertainty parameter 0
- Observation arc: 66.70 yr (24,364 days)
- Aphelion: 3.2153 AU
- Perihelion: 2.9115 AU
- Semi-major axis: 3.0634 AU
- Eccentricity: 0.0496
- Orbital period (sidereal): 5.36 yr (1,958 days)
- Mean anomaly: 106.92°
- Mean motion: 0° 11^{m} 1.68^{s} / day
- Inclination: 15.759°
- Longitude of ascending node: 298.77°
- Argument of perihelion: 89.936°

Physical characteristics
- Dimensions: 17.47±0.64 km 20.89 km (derived); 21.09±0.67 km 21.14±1.0 km 23.807±0.154; 24.065±0.282 km
- Synodic rotation period: 8.016±0.005 h 8.0229±0.0041 h (R); 8.0262±0.0020 h (R)
- Geometric albedo: 0.1937 (derived); 0.197±0.032; 0.1986±0.0276; 0.2494±0.026; 0.261±0.018; 0.304±0.055
- Spectral type: X · C
- Absolute magnitude (H): 10.5 · 10.70 · 10.766±0.003 (R) · 10.8 · 10.91±0.26

1853 McElroy, provisional designation 1957 XE, is an asteroid from the outer region of the asteroid belt, approximately 21 kilometers in diameter. It was discovered on 15 December 1957, by the Indiana Asteroid Program at Goethe Link Observatory near Brooklyn, Indiana, United States, and named for American biochemist William D. McElroy.

== Orbit and classification ==
McElroy orbits the Sun in the outer main-belt at a distance of 2.9–3.2 AU once every 5 years and 4 months (1,958 days). Its orbit has an eccentricity of 0.05 and an inclination of 16° with respect to the ecliptic.

It was first identified as 1930 YP at Lowell Observatory in 1930. However the observation remained unused and the body's observation arc begins with its official discovery in 1957.

== Physical characteristics ==
McElroy is characterized as a generic X-type and carbonaceous C-type asteroid by the Lightcurve Data Base and by PanSTARRS' photometric survey, respectively.

=== Rotation period ===
Between 2004 and 2011, three rotational lightcurves of McElroy were obtained at Brian Warner's Palmer Divide Observatory and at the Palomar Transient Factory, respectively. Lightcurve analysis gave a rotation period between 8.016 and 8.026 hours with a brightness variation of 0.18–0.30 magnitude (U=3-/2/2).

=== Diameter and albedo ===
According to the surveys carried out by the Infrared Astronomical Satellite IRAS, the Japanese Akari satellite, and NASA's Wide-field Infrared Survey Explorer with its subsequent NEOWISE mission, McElroy measures between 17.47 and 24.07 kilometers in diameter, and its surface has an albedo of 0.197 to 0.304.

The Collaborative Asteroid Lightcurve Link derives an albedo of 0.194 and a diameter of 20.89 kilometers with an absolute magnitude of 10.8.

== Naming ==
This minor planet was named in honor of American biochemist William David McElroy (1917–1999), chairman of the biology department at Johns Hopkins University during the 1950s and 1960s, later director of the National Science Foundation (NSF) in the early 1970s and chancellor of the University of California at San Diego from until 1980.

During his tenure as director of NSF the U.S. government decided to fund the Very Large Array. The official naming citation was published by the Minor Planet Center on 1 August 1980 (M.P.C. 5450).
