= 9260 Edwardolson =

Asteroid

Discovery
- Discovered by: Indiana University (Indiana Asteroid Program)
- Discovery site: Goethe Link Obs.
- Discovery date: 8 October 1953

Designations
- Named after: Edward C. Olson (astronomer)
- Alternative designations: 1953 TA_{1} · 1991 QH
- Minor planet category: main-belt · Flora

Orbital characteristics
- Epoch 4 September 2017 (JD 2458000.5)
- Uncertainty parameter 0
- Observation arc: 63.48 yr (23,185 days)
- Aphelion: 2.8164 AU
- Perihelion: 1.7638 AU
- Semi-major axis: 2.2901 AU
- Eccentricity: 0.2298
- Orbital period (sidereal): 3.47 yr (1,266 days)
- Mean anomaly: 165.54°
- Mean motion: 0° 17^{m} 3.84^{s} / day
- Inclination: 5.0979°
- Longitude of ascending node: 214.59°
- Argument of perihelion: 148.34°
- Known satellites: 1 (Note: Central Bureau for Astronomical Telegrams, No. 270, 2 November 2005, for (9260) Edwardolson A photometric observations between 6 and 30 October 2005, show that 9260 Edwardolson is a binary system with an orbital period of 17.785±0.003 hours. The primary rotates with a period of 3.0852±0.0001 hours, and its lightcurve has a brightness variation of 0.11 magnitude, which is indicative of a nearly spheroidal shape. Mutual eclipse/occultation events, that are between 0.08 and 0.15 magnitude deep, indicate a secondary-to-primary mean-diameter ratio of 0.27±0.03. Reported by M. Jakubik and M. Husarik, Skalnate Pleso Observatory; J. Vilagi, S. Gajdos, and A. Galad, Modra Observatory; P. Pravec and P. Kusnirak, Ondrejov Observatory; W. Cooney, J. Gross and D. Terrell via Sonoita Research Observatory (Sonoita, AZ); D. Pray, Greene, RI; and R. Stephens, Yucca Valley, CA Central Bureau for Astronomical Telegrams)

Physical characteristics
- Dimensions: 4.05 km (taken); 4.052 km 4.115±0.362 km
- Synodic rotation period: 3.0852±0.0001 h
- Geometric albedo: 0.1643; 0.262±0.037
- Spectral type: S
- Absolute magnitude (H): 14.0 · 14.1 · 14.54±0.086

9260 Edwardolson, provisional designation 1953 TA_{1}, is a Florian binary asteroid from the inner regions of the asteroid belt, approximately 4.1 kilometers in diameter. It was discovered on 8 October 1953, by Indiana University during its Indiana Asteroid Program at Goethe Link Observatory in Brooklyn, Indiana, United States. It was named for American astronomer Edward Olson.

== Classification and orbit ==
Edwardolson is a member of the Flora family, one of the largest families of stony asteroids. It orbits the Sun in the inner main-belt at a distance of 1.8–2.8 AU once every 3 years and 6 months (1,266 days). Its orbit has an eccentricity of 0.23 and an inclination of 5° with respect to the ecliptic. As no precoveries were taken, the asteroid's observation arc begins with its official discovery observation in 1953.

== Diameter, albedo and rotation ==
A rotational lightcurve of Edwardolson was obtained from photometric observations in several locations including the Slovakian Skalnaté pleso Observatory. It rendered a rotation period of 3.0852±0.0001 hours with a low brightness variation of 0.11 in magnitude, which suggests that the body has a nearly spheroidal shape (U=n/a). According to the survey carried out by the NEOWISE mission of NASA's Wide-field Infrared Survey Explorer, the asteroid has an albedo of 0.26 and 0.16, and an respective absolute magnitude of 14.0 and 14.54. Both data sets converge to a diameter of 4.1 kilometers.

== Moon ==
A minor-planet moon orbiting Edwardolson was discovered in 2005, making it a binary system. The satellite has a fairly short orbital period of 17 hours, 47 minutes, and 2 seconds (17.785±0.003 hours), and an estimated mean-diameter ratio of 0.27±0.03, which would give the satellite a diameter of approximately 1.0 to 1.3 kilometers.

== Naming ==
This minor planet was named in honor of American astronomer Edward C. Olson (born 1930) of the University of Illinois whose observations explained the distortion of the outer layers of mass-gaining stars, and how their rotation can come close to the stability limit during the involved mass-transfer process and the preserved angular momentum. Olson was also an active member of the International Astronomical Union, affiliated with its Division G Stars and Stellar Physics. The approved naming citation was published by the Minor Planet Center on 13 July 2004 (M.P.C. 52322).
