= 1602 Indiana =

Main-belt asteroid

Discovery
- Discovered by: Indiana University (Indiana Asteroid Program)
- Discovery site: Goethe Link Obs.
- Discovery date: March 14, 1950

Designations
- Named after: Indiana (U.S. state)
- Alternative designations: 1950 GF · 1943 DJ; 1975 XR
- Minor planet category: main-belt · Flora

Orbital characteristics
- Epoch September 4, 2017 (JD 2458000.5)
- Uncertainty parameter 0
- Observation arc: 74.27 yr (27,128 days)
- Aphelion: 2.4796 AU
- Perihelion: 2.0104 AU
- Semi-major axis: 2.2450 AU
- Eccentricity: 0.1045
- Orbital period (sidereal): 3.36 yr (1,229 days)
- Mean anomaly: 57.226°
- Mean motion: 0° 17^{m} 34.8^{s} / day
- Inclination: 4.1618°
- Longitude of ascending node: 75.134°
- Argument of perihelion: 73.437°

Physical characteristics
- Dimensions: 7.970±0.810 km 8.41±0.59 km 8.515±0.047 km 8.62 km (calculated)
- Synodic rotation period: 2.57±0.06 h (Note: Pietschnig (2011) web: rotation period 2.57±0.06 with a brightness amplitude of 0.19 in magnitude. See Pietschnig, M. (2011). Summary figures at Asteroid Lightcurve Database for (1602) Indiana); 2.601±0.001 h 2.610±0.001 h
- Geometric albedo: 0.24 (assumed); 0.2503±0.0493; 0.259±0.040; 0.297±0.095
- Spectral type: B–V = 0.930; U–B = 0.550; Tholen = S · S
- Absolute magnitude (H): 12.49 · 12.57±0.24

1602 Indiana, provisional designation 1950 GF, is a stony Florian asteroid from the inner regions of the asteroid belt, approximately 8 kilometers in diameter.

It was discovered on March 14, 1950, by IU's Indiana Asteroid Program at Goethe Link Observatory near Brooklyn, Indiana, in the United States. It was later named after the U.S. state of Indiana and for Indiana University.

== Classification and orbit ==
Indiana is a member of the Flora family, a large collisional group of stony S-type asteroids in the inner main-belt. It orbits the Sun at a distance of 2.0–2.5 AU once every 3 years and 4 months (1,229 days). Its orbit has an eccentricity of 0.10 and an inclination of 4° with respect to the ecliptic. Indiana was first identified as 1943 DJ at Turku Observatory in Finland, extending the body's observation arc by 7 years prior to its official discovery observation.

== Physical characteristics ==
=== Rotation period ===
Three rotational lightcurves of Indiana were obtained from photometric observations taken by astronomer Michael Pietschnig, Gary Vander Haagen and Michael Fleenor in Spring 2007. The lightcurve analysis gave a rotation period between 2.57 and 2.61 hours with a change in brightness of 0.12 to 0.19 magnitude, respectively (U=2/3/3-).

=== Diameter and albedo ===
According to the surveys carried out by the Japanese Akari satellite and NASA's Wide-field Infrared Survey Explorer with its subsequent NEOWISE mission, Indiana measures between 7.97 and 8.52 kilometers in diameter, and its surface has an albedo between 0.250 and 0.297. The Collaborative Asteroid Lightcurve Link assumes an albedo of 0.24 – derived from 8 Flora, the largest member and namesake of this family – and calculates a diameter of 8.62 kilometers with an absolute magnitude of 12.49.

== Naming ==
This minor planet was named for the U.S. state of Indiana and for Indiana University with its astronomy department, which is the parent institution of the discovering Goethe Link Observatory.

Originally the discovery was credited to Beryl H. Potter (1900–1985), after whom the asteroid 1729 Beryl is named. She was research assistant at the Indiana University, who participated in the program of minor planet observations from 1949 to 1966. During this period, she analysed nearly 6,300 photographic plates, measuring the positions of minor planets and reporting lost asteroids to IAU's Minor Planet Circulars (MPCs) for publication. However, according to Frank K. Edmondson (1912–2008), chairman of the Astronomy Department of Indiana University (also see 1761 Edmondson), there were several assistants involved in blinking the photographic plates during the first years of the program. The discovery was therefore credited to Indiana University, instead. The official naming citation was published by the Minor Planet Center in January 1955 (M.P.C. 1171).
