= 30718 Records =

Main-belt asteroid

Discovery
- Discovered by: Indiana University (Indiana Asteroid Program)
- Discovery site: Goethe Link Obs.
- Discovery date: 14 September 1955

Designations
- Named after: Brenda Records (Indiana manager)
- Alternative designations: 1955 RB_{1} · 1955 TJ; 1964 PH · 1978 VN_{13} 2001 KW_{67}
- Minor planet category: main-belt (middle) background

Orbital characteristics
- Epoch 4 September 2017 (JD 2458000.5)
- Uncertainty parameter 0
- Observation arc: 61.44 yr (22,442 days)
- Aphelion: 3.6403 AU
- Perihelion: 1.8894 AU
- Semi-major axis: 2.7649 AU
- Eccentricity: 0.3166
- Orbital period (sidereal): 4.60 yr (1,679 days)
- Mean anomaly: 185.58°
- Mean motion: 0° 12^{m} 51.84^{s} / day
- Inclination: 5.2938°
- Longitude of ascending node: 278.31°
- Argument of perihelion: 54.686°

Physical characteristics
- Mean diameter: 9.219±0.022 km
- Geometric albedo: 0.066±0.010
- Absolute magnitude (H): 14.0

30718 Records (provisional designation 1955 RB_{1}) is a dark background asteroid from the central region of the asteroid belt, approximately 9 kilometers in diameter. It was discovered on 14 September 1955, by Indiana University's Indiana Asteroid Program at its Goethe Link Observatory near Brooklyn, Indiana, United States. It was the program's final discovery and was named after IU's astronomy staff member Brenda Records.

== Classification and orbit ==
Records is a non-family from the main belt's background population. It orbits the Sun in the central asteroid belt at a distance of 1.9–3.6 AU once every 4 years and 7 months (1,679 days). Its orbit has an eccentricity of 0.32 and an inclination of 5° with respect to the ecliptic. As no precoveries were taken, the body's observation arc begins with its official discovery observation in 1955.

== Physical characteristics ==
According to the survey carried out by the NEOWISE mission of NASA's Wide-field Infrared Survey Explorer, Records measures 9.219 kilometers in diameter and its surface has a low albedo of 0.066.

As of 2018, the asteroid's spectral type, as well as its rotation period and shape remain unknown.

== Naming ==
This minor planet honors Brenda Records (born 1946), who served as office manager for the Indiana University Department of Astronomy for over 20 years. Records was also an administrative assistant to astronomer Frank K. Edmondson, transcribing several of his books. The official naming citation was published by the Minor Planet Center on 24 November 2007 (M.P.C. 61269).
