= 2751 Campbell =

Stony main-belt asteroid

Discovery
- Discovered by: Indiana University (Indiana Asteroid Program)
- Discovery site: Goethe Link Obs.
- Discovery date: 7 September 1962

Designations
- Named after: William Wallace Campbell (American astronomer)
- Alternative designations: 1962 RP · 1973 RD; 1975 EO_{2} · 1977 RN_{6} 1981 WF_{4}
- Minor planet category: main-belt · Nysa–Polana complex

Orbital characteristics
- Epoch 4 September 2017 (JD 2458000.5)
- Uncertainty parameter 0
- Observation arc: 54.74 yr (19,995 days)
- Aphelion: 2.8245 AU
- Perihelion: 1.9880 AU
- Semi-major axis: 2.4062 AU
- Eccentricity: 0.1738
- Orbital period (sidereal): 3.73 yr (1,363 days)
- Mean anomaly: 191.78°
- Mean motion: 0° 15^{m} 50.76^{s} / day
- Inclination: 1.4901°
- Longitude of ascending node: 246.29°
- Argument of perihelion: 201.65°

Physical characteristics
- Dimensions: 5.73±1.14 km 6.907±0.287 km 7.46 km (calculated)
- Synodic rotation period: 2.747±0.001 h
- Geometric albedo: 0.20 (assumed); 0.281±0.011; 0.30±0.14
- Spectral type: S
- Absolute magnitude (H): 12.75±0.31 · 12.8 · 13.0 · 13.34

2751 Campbell, provisional designation 1962 RP, is a stony asteroid from the inner regions of the asteroid belt, approximately 6 kilometers in diameter.

It was discovered on 7 September 1962, by IU's Indiana Asteroid Program at Goethe Link Observatory near Brooklyn, Indiana, United States. It is named for American astronomer William Wallace Campbell.

== Classification and orbit ==
Campbell is a member of the stony subgroup of the Nysa–Polana complex, a collection of overlapping asteroid families in the inner main-belt not far from the Kirkwood gap at 2.5 AU, a depleted zone where a 3:1 orbital resonance with the orbit of Jupiter exists.

It orbits the Sun in the inner main-belt at a distance of 2.0–2.8 AU once every 3 years and 9 months (1,363 days). Its orbit has an eccentricity of 0.17 and an inclination of 1° with respect to the ecliptic. The body's observation arc begins with its official discovery observation, as no precoveries were taken, and no prior identifications were made.

== Physical characteristics ==
=== Diameter and albedo ===
According to the survey carried out by NASA's Wide-field Infrared Survey Explorer with its subsequent NEOWISE mission, Campbell measures 5.73 and 6.907 kilometers in diameter, and its surface has an albedo of 0.30 and 0.281, respectively, while the Collaborative Asteroid Lightcurve Link assumes a standard albedo for stony asteroids of 0.20 and calculates a larger diameter of 7.46 kilometers, with an absolute magnitude of 13.0. Campbell is an assumed S-type asteroid.

=== Rotation and shape ===
In November 2007, a rotational lightcurve of Campbell was obtained from photometric observations by French amateur astronomer Pierre Antonini. Lightcurve analysis gave a rotation period of 2.747 hours with a brightness variation of 0.08 magnitude, which indicates, that the body has a nearly spheroidal shape (U=3-).

== Naming ==
This minor planet was named in memory of American astronomer William Wallace Campbell (1862–1938), an observational spectroscopist and one of the first to measure the radial velocity of a large number of stars. In the 1920s and 1930s, Campbell was heading the U.S. National Academy of Sciences, the International Astronomical Union, and the University of California, and he was director of the Lick Observatory from 1901 to 1930. The lunar crater Campbell, as well as the Martian crater Campbell were named in his honor. The approved naming citation was published by the Minor Planet Center on 5 November 1987 (M.P.C. 12457).
