= Herget =

Herget is a German surname. Notable people with the surname include:

- Jimmy Herget (born 1993), American baseball player
- Kevin Herget (born 1991), American baseball player
- Matthias Herget (born 1955), German footballer and manager
- Paul Herget (1908–1981), American astronomer
- Wilhelm Herget (1910–1974), German World War II flying ace

== See also ==
- 1751 Herget, a main-belt asteroid
