= 1721 Wells =

Main-belt asteroid

Discovery
- Discovered by: Indiana University (Indiana Asteroid Program)
- Discovery site: Goethe Link Obs.
- Discovery date: 3 October 1953

Designations
- Named after: Herman Wells (Indiana University)
- Alternative designations: 1953 TD_{3} · 1944 DA; 1958 QE · A905 CG
- Minor planet category: main-belt · (outer)

Orbital characteristics
- Epoch 4 September 2017 (JD 2458000.5)
- Uncertainty parameter 0
- Observation arc: 112.13 yr (40,957 days)
- Aphelion: 3.2969 AU
- Perihelion: 3.0049 AU
- Semi-major axis: 3.1509 AU
- Eccentricity: 0.0463
- Orbital period (sidereal): 5.59 yr (2,043 days)
- Mean anomaly: 101.64°
- Inclination: 16.107°
- Longitude of ascending node: 317.29°
- Argument of perihelion: 137.52°

Physical characteristics
- Dimensions: 43.576±0.166 km
- Geometric albedo: 0.045±0.005
- Absolute magnitude (H): 10.9

1721 Wells, provisional designation 1953 TD_{3}, is a dark asteroid from the outer region of the asteroid belt, approximately 44 kilometers in diameter.

It was discovered on 3 October 1953, by Indiana University's (IU) Indiana Asteroid Program at Goethe Link Observatory near Brooklyn, Indiana, United States. It was named after IU president and chancellor Herman B Wells.

== Orbit and classification ==
Wells orbits the Sun in the outer main-belt at a distance of 3.0–3.3 AU once every 5 years and 7 months (2,043 days). Its orbit has an eccentricity of 0.05 and an inclination of 16° with respect to the ecliptic.

First identified as A905 CG at Heidelberg in 1905, Well's first used observation was taken at Turku in 1944, extending the asteroid's observation arc by 9 years prior to its official discovery observation.

== Physical characteristics ==
According to the survey carried out by NASA's Wide-field Infrared Survey Explorer with its subsequent NEOWISE mission, Wells measures 43.576 kilometers in diameter and its surface has an albedo of 0.045. It has an absolute magnitude of 10.9. As of 2017, Well's spectral type, rotation period and shape remain unknown.

== Naming ==
This minor planet was named in honor of Herman B Wells (1902–2000) chancellor and president of IU. During this time, Wells fostered higher education nationally and internationally. The official naming citation was published by the Minor Planet Center on 15 June 1973 (M.P.C. 3508).
