= 1827 Atkinson =

Main-belt asteroid

Discovery
- Discovered by: Indiana University (Indiana Asteroid Program)
- Discovery site: Goethe Link Obs.
- Discovery date: 7 September 1962

Designations
- Named after: Robert d'Escourt Atkinson (British astronomer)
- Alternative designations: 1962 RK · 1931 VC; 1955 FL · 1967 TL; 1973 EQ
- Minor planet category: main-belt · (middle)

Orbital characteristics
- Epoch 4 September 2017 (JD 2458000.5)
- Uncertainty parameter 0
- Observation arc: 85.41 yr (31,196 days)
- Aphelion: 3.1907 AU
- Perihelion: 2.2291 AU
- Semi-major axis: 2.7099 AU
- Eccentricity: 0.1774
- Orbital period (sidereal): 4.46 yr (1,629 days)
- Mean anomaly: 43.640°
- Mean motion: 0° 13^{m} 15.24^{s} / day
- Inclination: 4.5222°
- Longitude of ascending node: 220.56°
- Argument of perihelion: 239.58°

Physical characteristics
- Dimensions: 8.855±0.301 km
- Geometric albedo: 0.249±0.052
- Spectral type: Tholen = DU; B–V = 0.807
- Absolute magnitude (H): 12.39

1827 Atkinson, provisional designation 1962 RK, is a background asteroid from the central regions of the asteroid belt, approximately 9 kilometers in diameter. It was discovered on 7 September 1962, by IU's Indiana Asteroid Program at Goethe Link Observatory near Brooklyn, Indiana, United States. The asteroid was named after British astronomer Robert d'Escourt Atkinson.

== Orbit and classification ==
Atkinson is not a member of any known asteroid family. It orbits the Sun in the central main-belt at a distance of 2.2–3.2 AU once every 4 years and 6 months (1,629 days). Its orbit has an eccentricity of 0.18 and an inclination of 5° with respect to the ecliptic.

The body's observation arc begins with its first identification as 1931 VC at Uccle Observatory in November 1931, almost 31 years prior to its official discovery observation at Goethe Link.

== Physical characteristics ==
In the Tholen classification, Atkinson is similar to a dark D-type asteroid, though with an unusual spectrum (DU). This strongly disagrees with the albedo obtained by the Wide-field Infrared Survey Explorer (WISE), which indicates that is rather a stony S-type asteroid.

=== Rotation period ===
As of 2017, no rotational lightcurve of Atkinson has been obtained from photometric observations. The asteroid's rotation period, shape and poles remain unknown.

=== Diameter and albedo ===
According to the survey carried out by the NEOWISE mission of NASA's Wide-field Infrared Survey Explorer, Atkinson measures 8.855 kilometers in diameter and its surface has an albedo of 0.249.

== Naming ==
This minor planet was named after British astronomer, physicist and inventor, Robert d'Escourt Atkinson (1898–1982), noted for his contributions to fundamental astronomy. Atkinson pioneered in studying nuclear energy-generation in the Sun and stars. The official naming citation was published by the Minor Planet Center on 15 October 1977 (M.P.C. 4236).
