= 1763 Williams =

Main-belt asteroid

Discovery
- Discovered by: Indiana University (Indiana Asteroid Program)
- Discovery site: Goethe Link Obs.
- Discovery date: 13 October 1953

Designations
- Named after: Kenneth P. Williams (professor of mathematics at IU)
- Alternative designations: 1953 TN_{2} · 1939 EO; 1953 VJ · 1966 TN
- Minor planet category: main-belt · Flora background

Orbital characteristics
- Epoch 4 September 2017 (JD 2458000.5)
- Uncertainty parameter 0
- Observation arc: 63.73 yr (23,276 days)
- Aphelion: 2.6340 AU
- Perihelion: 1.7436 AU
- Semi-major axis: 2.1888 AU
- Eccentricity: 0.2034
- Orbital period (sidereal): 3.24 yr (1,183 days)
- Mean anomaly: 297.61°
- Mean motion: 0° 18^{m} 15.84^{s} / day
- Inclination: 4.2352°
- Longitude of ascending node: 304.47°
- Argument of perihelion: 28.831°

Physical characteristics
- Dimensions: 6.38±1.47 km 6.982±0.183 km 7.47 km (calculated)
- Synodic rotation period: 8 h 36 h (Note: Pravec (2008) web: rotation period of at least 36 hours with a brightness amplitude of greater than 0.30 mag. Quality Code of 2. Summary figures at Collaborative Asteroid Lightcurve Link (CALL))
- Geometric albedo: 0.24 (assumed); 0.32±0.16; 0.330±0.086; 0.3305±0.0865
- Spectral type: S
- Absolute magnitude (H): 12.6 · 12.68±0.26 · 12.80

1763 Williams, provisional designation 1953 TN_{2}, is a stony Florian asteroid from the inner regions of the asteroid belt, approximately 7 kilometers in diameter. It was discovered on 13 October 1953, by astronomers of the Indiana Asteroid Program at Goethe Link Observatory in Indiana, United States. The asteroid was named after Kenneth P. Williams, professor of mathematics at Indiana University.

== Orbit and classification ==
Based on its osculating Keplerian orbital elements, Williams qualifies as a member of the Flora family (402), a giant asteroid family and the largest family of stony asteroids in the main-belt (according to Zappalà but not Nesvorý). However, analysis using proper orbital elements in a hierarchical clustering method showed that Williams is a background asteroid, not belonging to any known family (Nesvorý, Milani and Knežević).

The asteroid orbits the Sun in the inner main-belt at a distance of 1.7–2.6 AU once every 3 years and 3 months (1,183 days). Its orbit has an eccentricity of 0.20 and an inclination of 4° with respect to the ecliptic.

The asteroid was first identified as 1939 EO at Nice Observatory in March 1939. The body's observation arc begins with its official discovery observation in October 1953.

== Physical characteristics ==
Williams is an assumed S-type asteroid.

=== Rotation period ===
In October 2008, a rotational lightcurve of Williams was obtained from photometric observations by Petr Pravec at Ondřejov Observatory in the Czech Republic. Lightcurve analysis gave a rotation period of at least 36 hours with a brightness amplitude of more than 0.30 magnitude (U=2). (Note: Lightcurve plot for (1763) Williams with a period of 90 hours (P > 36 h and A > 0.3 mag). Summary figures at website of the Ondrejov Asteroid Photometry Project) Another observation by Pierre Antonini gave a period of 8 hours (U=1+).

=== Diameter and albedo ===
According to the survey carried out by the NEOWISE mission of NASA's Wide-field Infrared Survey Explorer, Williams measures 6.38 and 6.982 kilometers in diameter and its surface has an albedo of 0.32 and 0.3305, respectively.

The Collaborative Asteroid Lightcurve Link assumes an albedo of 0.24 – derived from 8 Flora, the Flora family's largest member and namesake – and calculates a diameter of 7.47 kilometers based on an absolute magnitude of 12.8.

== Naming ==
This minor planet was named in honor of Kenneth P. Williams (1887–1958), long-time professor of mathematics at Indiana University. He was known for his textbook, the calculation of the orbits of asteroids and comets, and his detailed analysis of the transits of Mercury from 1723 to 1927. He also wrote Lincoln Finds a General, a five volume book about the American Civil War.

The name was proposed by Frank K. Edmondson, who initiated the Indiana Asteroid Program. The official naming citation was published by the Minor Planet Center on 20 February 1971 (M.P.C. 3143).
