= 1952 Hesburgh =

Carbonaceous-dark main-belt asteroid

Discovery
- Discovered by: Indiana University (Indiana Asteroid Program)
- Discovery site: Goethe Link Obs.
- Discovery date: 3 May 1951

Designations
- Named after: Theodore M. Hesburgh (University president)
- Alternative designations: 1951 JC · 1936 ND; 1939 AB · 1940 GQ; 1954 XC · 1974 KQ
- Minor planet category: main-belt · (outer)

Orbital characteristics
- Epoch 4 September 2017 (JD 2458000.5)
- Uncertainty parameter 0
- Observation arc: 77.14 yr (28,177 days)
- Aphelion: 3.5522 AU
- Perihelion: 2.6708 AU
- Semi-major axis: 3.1115 AU
- Eccentricity: 0.1416
- Orbital period (sidereal): 5.49 yr (2,005 days)
- Mean anomaly: 175.77°
- Mean motion: 0° 10^{m} 46.56^{s} / day
- Inclination: 14.255°
- Longitude of ascending node: 78.149°
- Argument of perihelion: 339.27°

Physical characteristics
- Dimensions: 32.39±8.33 km 35.55±1.4 km (IRAS:15); 37.501±0.151 km 39.660±0.381 km 41.27±1.19 km
- Mass: (4.5±1.5)×10^{16} kg (Note: Calculated from its standard gravitational parameter GM = 0.003±0.001 km^{3}/s^{2}.)
- Mean density: 1.72 g/cm^{3} (Note: Assuming a diameter of 37.5 km.)
- Synodic rotation period: 47.7±0.1 h (Note: Lightcurve plot of (1952) Hesburgh, Palmer Divide Observatory, B. D. Warner (2005). Due to a period of nearly 2 days, the photometric observations were more or less in sync with the body's rotation and no lightcurve maxima could be covered by either of the two consecutive observation sessions. The lightcurve amplitude could be larger than 0.18 magnitude.)
- Geometric albedo: 0.078±0.005; 0.080±0.012; 0.0837±0.0130; 0.10±0.03; 0.1041±0.009 (IRAS:15)
- Spectral type: Tholen = CD: · CD: B–V = 0.756; U–B = 0.340
- Absolute magnitude (H): 10.31±0.33 · 10.32

1952 Hesburgh, provisional designation 1951 JC, is a rare-type carbonaceous asteroid from the outer regions of the asteroid belt, approximately 37 kilometers in diameter.

It was discovered on 3 May 1951, by IU's Indiana Asteroid Program at Goethe Link Observatory near Brooklyn, Indiana, United States. It was named for Father Theodore M. Hesburgh.

== Orbit and classification ==
Hesburgh orbits the Sun in the outer main-belt at a distance of 2.7–3.6 AU once every 5 years and 6 months (2,005 days). Its orbit has an eccentricity of 0.14 and an inclination of 14° with respect to the ecliptic. It was first identified as 1936 ND at Johannesburg Observatory in 1936. The body's observation arc begins at Goethe, five days after its official discovery observation.

== Physical characteristics ==
=== Lightcurve ===
In March 2005, a rotational lightcurve of Hesburgh was obtained from photometric observations by American astronomer Brian Warner at his Palmer Divide Observatory in Colorado. Lightcurve analysis gave a longer-than average rotation period of 47.7 hours with a brightness variation of at least 0.18 magnitude (U=2).

=== Spectral type ===
In the Tholen taxonomy, Hesburgh is a rare CD: spectral type, an intermediary between the common carbonaceous C-type asteroid and the dark D-type asteroid, which is typical among the Jupiter trojans beyond the main-belt. Another asteroid with a CD:-type is 691 Lehigh.

=== Diameter and albedo ===
According to the surveys carried out by the Infrared Astronomical Satellite IRAS, the Japanese Akari satellite, and NASA's Wide-field Infrared Survey Explorer with its subsequent NEOWISE mission, Hesburgh measures between 32.39 and 41.27 kilometers in diameter and its surface has an albedo between 0.078 and 0.1041. The Collaborative Asteroid Lightcurve Link adopts the results obtained by IRAS, that is, an albedo of 0.1041 and a diameter of 35.55 kilometers with an absolute magnitude of 10.32.

== Naming ==
This minor planet was named after American Theodore M. Hesburgh (1917–2015), a priest and president of the University of Notre Dame in Notre Dame, Indiana. He was also a member of the National Science Board and played a decisive role for the founding of the Kitt Peak National Observatory, as well as of the Chilean Cerro Tololo Interamerican Observatory during the 1960s. The approved naming citation was published by the Minor Planet Center on 1 January 1981 (M.P.C. 5688).
