= Marshal Henry Wrubel =

Marshal Henry Wrubel (31 March 1924 in New York City – 26 October 1968) was a child prodigy in music, an astrophysicist, and the first director of Indiana University's Research Computing Center.

At age 11 Marshal Wrubel entered the Juilliard School to study piano. In 1944 he graduated from Juilliard and also graduated from CUNY with a B.A. in physics. After graduation, he served in the U. S. Army for two years and worked at the Los Alamos Scientific Laboratory. After completing his military service Wrubel entered in 1946 the astrophysics doctoral program of the University of Chicago and received in 1949 his Ph.D. under Chandrasekhar. He spent the 1949-1950 academic year at Princeton University as a postdoc on a National Research Council Fellowship. According to Paul Routly, Wrubel

"was a brilliant pianist. In fact he had been trained at the Juilliard for years as a pianist and he was torn at one point in his career as to whether he was going to become a professional astronomer or a concert pianist. He was that good. So he finally decided to before a professional astronomer but he always maintained a wonderful interest in music. In fact I think that's one reason why he went to Indiana because of the music department."

At Indiana University he became in 1950 an assistant professor and in 1966 a full professor of astronomy. Wrubel was the director of Indiana University's Research Computing Center from 1955 to 1958; the Center was renamed in his honor in 1973. For the academic year 1968–1969 he was a Guggenheim Fellow at the Joint Institute for Laboratory Astrophysics in Boulder, Colorado, but in October 1968 he went for a mountain hike with his daughter and died from a heart attack. Marshal Wrubel was survived by his daughters, Emily and Julia, and his wife Natalie Wrubel, née Frank, (1925–2010), who was his high school sweetheart and married him in 1946. The asteroid 1765 Wrubel is named in his honor.

== Selected works ==
- Stellar interiors, Handbuch der Physik, vol. 51, 1958
- Primer of programming for digital computers, McGraw Hill 1959
- as editor: Proceedings of the National Science Foundation conference on stellar atmospheres, held at Indiana University, September/October 1954, 1955
