= Robert d'Escourt Atkinson =

British astronomer, physicist and inventor (1898–1982)

Robert d'Escourt Atkinson (11 April 1898 – 28 October 1982) was a British astronomer, physicist and inventor.

== Biography ==
Robert d'Escourt Atkinson was born in Rhayader, Wales, on April 11, 1898. He went to Manchester Grammar School and received a degree in physics from Oxford in 1922. He worked in the Clarendon Laboratory and then went to Göttingen, where he received a Ph.D. in physics in 1928. After teaching physics at the Berlin Technische Hochscule for a year, Atkinson was appointed Assistant Professor of Physics at Rutgers University. He taught at Rutgers University in New Jersey from 1929 to 1937, when he became Chief Assistant at the Royal Greenwich Observatory. During World War II, Atkinson was called away from this position to do anti-magnetic mine work. In 1944, he was lent out to the Ballistic Research Laboratory at Aberdeen Proving Ground in Maryland, where he worked under famed astronomer Edwin Hubble. Atkinson stayed there for two years then returned to Royal Greenwich Observatory. A large amount of his remaining years at the Royal Observatory were spent overseeing the move of the entire Observatory to Herstmonceux Castle in Sussex. In 1964, Atkinson retired from the Royal Observatory and came to Indiana University as a visiting professor. He became an adjunct professor in 1973 and a professor emeritus in 1979 at Indiana University. Also involved in professional associations, Atkinson was a founder-member of the Royal Institute of Navigation and served as president of the British Astronomical Association for one year. Atkinson passed away in Bloomington on October 28, 1982.

== Work ==
In 1929, Atkinson collaborated with Fritz Houtermans to apply Gamow's quantum tunnelling theory to the process of nuclear fusion in stars. They showed that fusing light nuclei could create energy in accordance with Einstein's formula of mass-energy equivalence, and that heavy nuclei could be built up by a successive series of fusions. Their models were similar to the later CNO cycle. This theory was not accepted at the time as it depended on the idea that stars were mostly hydrogen. Atkinson wrote about this theory again in the 1930s, predicting that the most luminous stars should have a short lifetime. He also proposed that the elements found in the Universe could be built up by fusion in stars, and that white dwarf stars did not need a nuclear source of energy in order to shine. After World War II, he worked on astronomical instrumentation and positional astronomy.

Atkinson's mechanical skills led to a commission to design an astronomical clock for York Minster, the York Minster astronomical clock.

== Honors ==
- Fellow of the Royal Astronomical Society and the Royal Institute of Navigation.
- Eddington Medal of the Royal Astronomical Society for work on stellar fusion (1960)
- The asteroid 1827 Atkinson is named after him.
