= Kenneth P. Williams =

Kenneth Powers Williams (August 25, 1887 – September 25, 1958) was a professor of mathematics at Indiana University, a distinguished soldier, and a Reserve Officers' Training Corps commander. He was known as the "Father of ROTC" at Indiana University.

== Early life and education ==
Kenneth Powers Williams was born in Urbana, Ohio on August 25, 1887, to John H. and Eva Augusta (Powers) Williams. He attended Clark College from 1905 to 1906. Williams then enrolled at Indiana University where he received his A.B. in 1908 and his A.M. degree in 1909. In 1911, he went to Princeton University where he earned a PhD. in 1913.

== Academic career ==
In 1909, Williams was named an instructor of mathematics in the Department of Mathematics at Indiana University. He was granted a leave from there in 1911 to attend Princeton University. In 1914, Williams returned and resumed his teaching career in the Department of Mathematics.

During his academic career at I.U., Williams served as an assistant professor from 1914 to 1919, an associate professor from 1919 to 1924, and as a Full Professor from 1924 to 1937. He was awarded the Chair of the Department of Mathematics in 1938 which he served as until 1944. Williams retired in 1957 as a Distinguished Service Professor Emeritus.

Williams made many noteworthy achievements in the fields of mathematics, astronomy, and history over his career. He is best known for his five-volume book, Lincoln Finds a General, published from 1949 to 1957. Williams had intended to write seven books, but became ill and died just before Volume 5 was published. Volume 1 was reprinted by Indiana University Press, Volumes 3 and 4 were reprinted by University of Kansas Press as "Grant Rises in the West." Another publisher, Macmilian Press, published the five-volume work. (See: Bibliography of Ulysses S. Grant)

== Military career ==
In addition to his career in education, Williams also had a successful military career. He first served as a first lieutenant with the Indiana National Guard near the Mexican border in 1916 during the Mexican Border Expedition. On April 17, 1917, Indiana University established a military training program in Bloomington called the Student Army Training Corps with Williams in command. In 1919, the Student Army Training Corps was renamed the Reserve Officers Training Corps. From 1917 to 1919, he served in the Rainbow Division as a U.S. Army captain of field artillery with the American Expeditionary Force. From 1921 to 1931, he served as an officer in the Indiana National Guard Field Artillery. From 1931 to 1939, he served as a colonel and the chief of staff of the 38th division of the Indiana National Guard before commanding the 113th Quartermaster Regiment, and eventually becoming quartermaster of the 38th division in national service.

== Marriage ==
Williams married Mrs. Ellen (Laughlin) Scott on August 20, 1920. They had no children.

== Death ==
After several months of illness, Williams died on September 25, 1958.

== Honors and awards ==
Williams received many commendations for his military service including the Indiana Distinguished Service Award. The main-belt asteroid, 1763 Williams, was named in his honor.

== Mathematical articles ==
- Williams, K. P. (1913). "The solutions of non-homogeneous linear difference equations and their asymptotic form". Trans. Amer. Math. Soc. 14 (2): 209–240. doi:10.1090/s0002-9947-1913-1500945-5. MR 1500945.
- Williams, K. P. (1913). "The asymptotic form of the function Ψ(x)". Bull. Amer. Math. Soc. 19 (9): 472–479. doi:10.1090/s0002-9904-1913-02400-5. MR 1559396.
- Williams, K. P. (1922). "Note concerning the roots of an equation". Bull. Amer. Math. Soc. 28 (8): 394–396. doi:10.1090/s0002-9904-1922-03598-7. MR 1560593.
