= Yoshio Fujita =

Japanese astronomer (1908–2013)

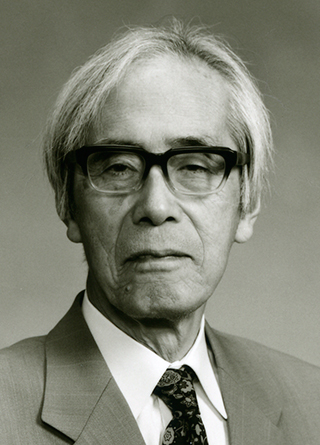
- Born: September 28, 1908; Mikuni, Fukui Prefecture (now Sakai, Fukui)
- Died: 13 January 2013 (aged 104)
- Spouse(s): Kazuko Nezu, m. 1941

Yoshio Fujita (藤田 良雄, Fujita Yoshio, 28 September 1908 – 13 January 2013) was a Japanese astronomer known for his contributions on spectroscopic observations of low temperature stars. He also served as president of the Japan Academy from April 1994 to April 2000.

== Early life and education ==
Yoshio Fujita was born the oldest of five children in Mikuni in the Fukui Prefecture. His father was a writer and editor at a local newspaper and proficient in the Japanese poetry style of Waka. He described in an oral history interview that his early interest in the cosmos as coming from the constellations he could view from his home city:

"My country is called snow country. In the wintertime, we have a lot of snow. And it's often cloudy, or snowy, and sometimes rainy. So it is very hard to see clear sky. But if it clears up, however, the sky is beautiful, wonderful constellations. And I was very happy to see with my naked eye a beautiful constellation. And first I was interested in constellations, and I got to know some details of stars."

Fujita graduated high school in 1928 and went on to study mathematics and astronomy at the Tokyo Imperial University (now the University of Tokyo). He then began to focus more on his astronomies studies and when asked about the decision, is quoted as saying "I had the impression of beautiful constellations. Very simple thought I think." Between 1930 and 1931 he studied under the astronomers Yusuke Hagihara and Kiyotsugu Hirayama and executed an observational study of the spectrum of Eros at its close approach, using a small astrograph equipped with an objective prism. He graduated in the Department of Astronomy, Physics Division, in 1931.

== Career ==
In 1931, he became an assistant to Yusuke Hagihara at the Tokyo Astronomical Observatory (now the National Astronomical Observatory of Japan).

In 1937 he was promoted to university lecturer at Tokyo Imperial University and collaborated with Toshio Takamine. Here he began his career-long work centered on spectroscopic studies of the sun, late-type stars, and carbon stars, and on improving instrumentation at the observatory.

When World War II began, Fujita and the physics and astronomy departments and their students moved to Suwa, Nagano until 1945.

In 1950, Fujita began a 15-month stint in the United States at Lick Observatory and Yerkes Observatory. There he worked with George Herbig to obtain spectroscopic data and spent time blinking plates for Kuiper looking for asteroids. He then returned to Japan as a full professor, where he continued to work until he retired in 1969.

He served as president of the Astronomical Society of Japan from 1961 to 1963 and as president of IAU Commission 29 from 1970 to 1973. In 1994 he was elected president of the Japan Academy.

== Honors and awards ==
- 1955: Imperial Prize of the Japan Academy
- 1984: Honorary Member of American Astronomical Society
- 1986: Lifetime Member of the Royal Astronomical Society
- 1989: The minor planet 5352 Fujita is named in his honor. The minor planet was discovered by Yoshio Kushida and Osamu Muramatsu at Yatsugatake South Base Observatory.
- 1994: Elected president of the Japan Academy

== Works ==
- Interpretation of Spectra and Atmospheric Structure in Cool Stars (University Park Press, 1970)
- Collected Papers on the Spectroscopic Behaviour of Cool Stars, 1997

== Personal life ==
Fujita married Kazuko Nezu in 1941. They had three children.
