= York Minster astronomical clock =

Memorial and clock in York Minster, England

Coordinates: 53°57′43″N 1°4′55″W

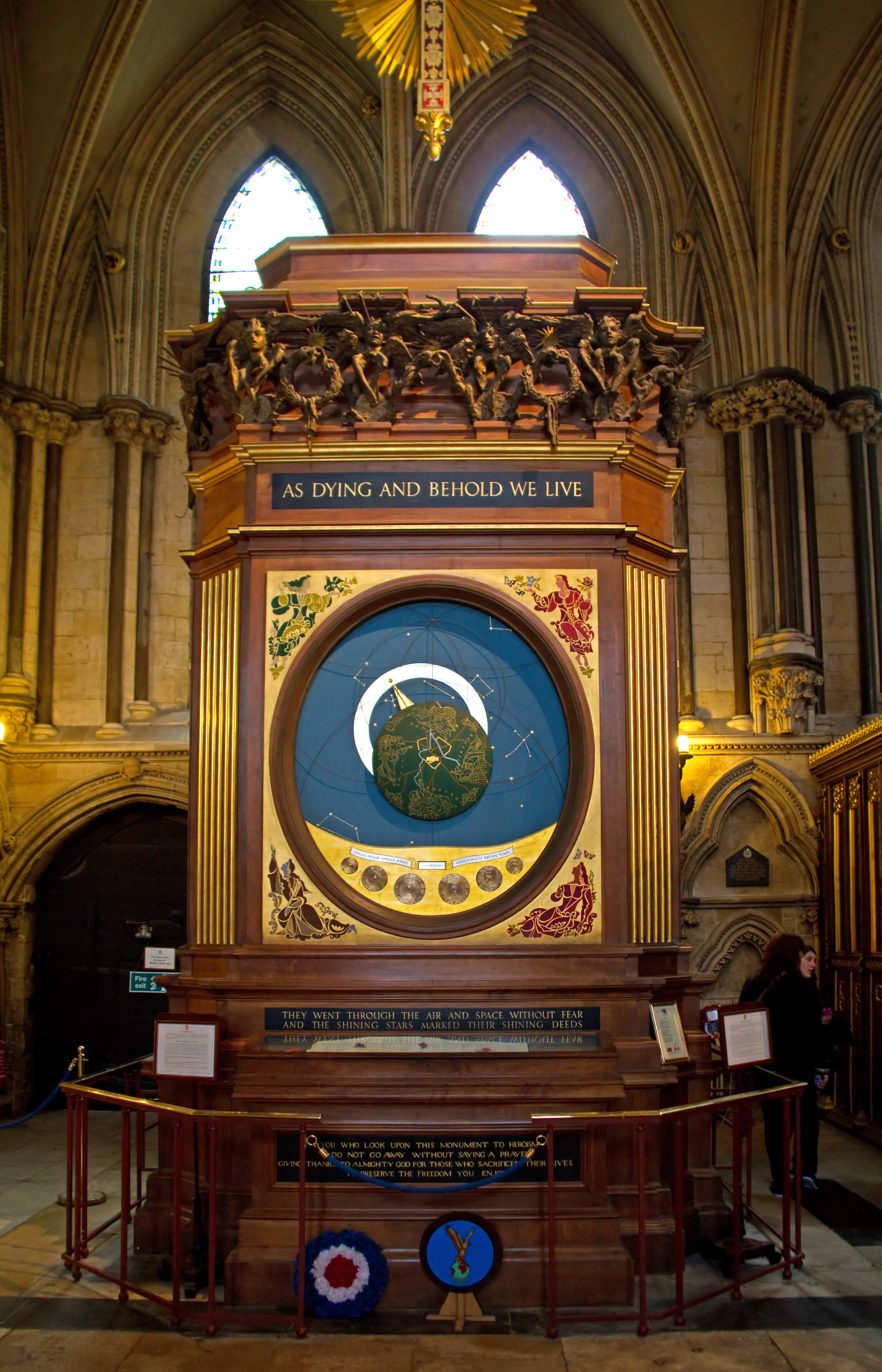
The clock photographed in 2012

The York Minster astronomical clock is a memorial to the airmen operating from bases in Yorkshire, Durham, and Northumberland who were killed in action during World War II, designed by R. Atkinson, and installed in York Minster in 1955.

== History ==
The clock was first conceived in 1944 and designed by Robert d'Escourt Atkinson, chief assistant at the Royal Greenwich Observatory. Atkinson based the design on the appearance of the sun and stars from the viewpoint of a pilot flying over York. The mechanism and two dials were constructed by A.C.S. Westcott and Royal Greenwich Observatory craftsmen, and installed in the north transept of York Minster in 1955.

Damage to the clock's mechanism was sustained during a fire, on 9 July 1984; after 10 years' work attempting repair, vergers ceased winding it, owing to its inaccuracies of time-keeping.

== Display dials ==
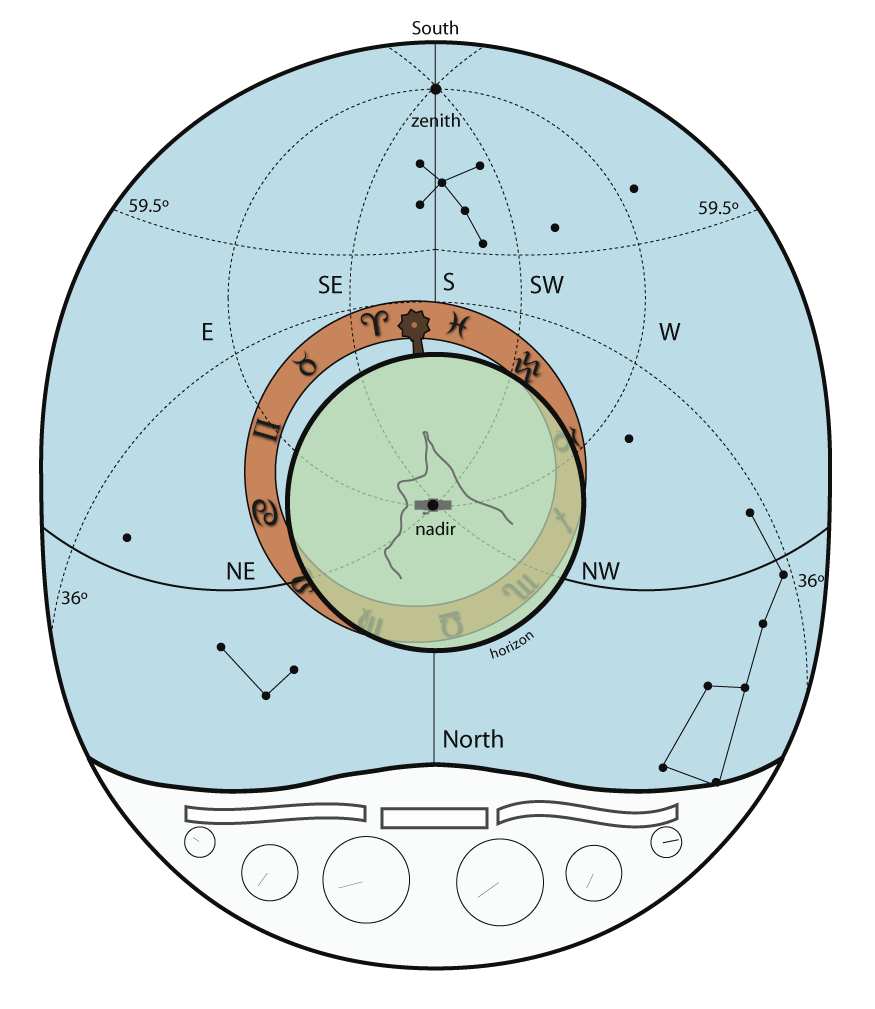
The grid system of the York Minster astronomical clock.

The front dial shows the locations of the Sun and certain navigational stars as would be seen by a pilot flying south above York Minster. To locate his position, a fixed circular plate, about 62 cm (slightly over 2 feet) in diameter and slightly dished, carries a ground plan of the Minster and surrounding markings representative of city walls, rivers, and principal roads. Since the edge of the plate represents the effective horizon, its centre identifies the pilot's nadir.

Mounted behind the plate there is a star-planisphere, based on a north pole stereographic zenithal projection (a projection from the north pole onto a plane passing through the south pole, and perpendicular to the solar axis). This rotates once in a sidereal day on an axis passing through its south celestial pole and located some 13 cm above the centre of the horizon plate. For decoration it carries a few basic star patterns (considerably distorted owing to the projection used) and an eccentric zodiac / ecliptic / calendar ring faced with silver, and restricted in width to the distance between the solstitial points.

Associated with the ring is a rayed apparent-sun emblem whose supporting arm system moves to and fro relative to a main mean-motion arm by an amount corresponding to the equation of time, and also radially to represent changes in the sun's declination. Sun-emblem and horizon-plate therefore combine to show the times of the Sun's rising, southing, and setting throughout the year and, by means of the rays of the sun emblem, the extent of the twilight.

To complete the front dial display, two sets of curved wires are mounted in front of the planisphere. One set of two wires indicates lines of equal altitude 36° and 59.5° and supplements the edge of the horizon plate (altitude 0°); they cross a vertical north–south wire to indicate the Sun's meridian altitude at the equinoxes and solstices respectively. The second set, in addition to the north–south element, forms a complete circle and the sectors of two larger circles; all four wires intersect at the centre of the horizon plate (nadir) and a point near the top of the north–south line (zenith).

The rear planisphere, similar in size to the one in the front but strictly circular, displays the brightest stars of the main circumpolar constellations (Ursa Major, Ursa Minor, and Cassiopeia). It is centred on the north celestial pole and, with its encircling silvered ring of 24 hour intervals, rotates once a sidereal day relative to a fixed meridian-index.

== Gearing ==
The planisphere is attached to a large wheel driven by a worm gear, which is connected to a gear box containing the wheel-train. The gear wheels have ratios 45/29, 71/151, and 257/187, producing a solar to sidereal ratio of 821115 : 818873 = ( 45 × 71 × 257 ) : (29 × 151 × 187 ) . This produces an approximation for the mean tropical year of 365.24219447 days (compare to 365.24219265 days).

The worm gear serving the similar wheel of the mean-sun arm is connected to the input end of the gear box, and also, through a 3000:1 reduction gear, to a 1500 RPM synchronous electric motor, running off the main electricity supply.

For the equation correction, a wheel on a lever associated with the mean solar arm rolls round an annular cam of sheet brass about 61 cm in diameter. Beneath the planisphere, three small dials show hours, minutes, and seconds of Greenwich Mean Time, and three similar and balancing dials give local sidereal time in degrees, minutes, and seconds of arc. An aperture indicates the name of the day of the week.
