= James Cuffey =

American astronomer

- Born: October 8, 1911; Chicago, Illinois
- Died: May 30, 1999 (aged 87); Bloomington, Indiana
- Education: Northwestern University, Harvard University
- Known for: Cuffey Iris Photometer
- Scientific career
- Fields: astronomy
- Workplaces: Indiana University, United States Naval Academy, New Mexico State University
- Doctoral advisor: Harlow Shapley

James Cuffey (October 8, 1911 – May 30, 1999) was an American astronomer. He specialized in photoelectric photometry and held the patent on the Cuffey Iris Photometer, an instrument used in stellar photographic photometry.

Born in Chicago, Illinois, Cuffey became a graduate student at Northwestern University in 1934, then went on to Harvard University as a doctoral student under Harlow Shapley. He received his Ph.D. from Harvard in 1938, then took a position as a postdoctoral fellow at Indiana University. Serving in the United States Navy in World War II, Cuffey taught navigation at the U.S. Naval Academy. In 1946, he returned to Indiana University, where he became a researcher in the Indiana Asteroid Program, begun in 1949. In 1966, he joined Clyde Tombaugh in starting the astronomy program at New Mexico State University, where he remained until he retired in 1976.

Cuffey was married to astronomer Rita Paraboschi. They had four children. Cuffey died in Bloomington, Indiana. The asteroid 2334 Cuffey is named in his honor.

== Notes and references ==
- Beebe, H.A., Obituary: James Cuffey, 1911-1999, Bulletin of the American Astronomical Society, vol. 32, no. 4, p. 1658-1659.
- Ken Kingery, Betting on a Sure Thing: A "Record" Ending to Indiana Asteroid Program, Indiana Alumni Magazine, v.1, no. 2, September/October 2008, Bloomington, IN: Indiana University Alumni Association, pp. 46–47.
- Space Daily, April 8, 2008.
