= 1729 Beryl =

Main-belt asteroid

Discovery
- Discovered by: Indiana University (Indiana Asteroid Program)
- Discovery site: Goethe Link Obs.
- Discovery date: 19 September 1963

Designations
- Named after: Beryl H. Potter (research assistant)
- Alternative designations: 1963 SL · 1933 ST; 1942 EW · 1949 JL; 1950 VR · 1952 DO_{2} 1955 BD · 1959 JB; 1959 JL · 1959 LH; 1972 GD_{2}
- Minor planet category: main-belt · (inner) background

Orbital characteristics
- Epoch 27 April 2019 (JD 2458600.5)
- Uncertainty parameter 0
- Observation arc: 84.59 yr (30,896 d)
- Aphelion: 2.4548 AU
- Perihelion: 2.0049 AU
- Semi-major axis: 2.2299 AU
- Eccentricity: 0.1009
- Orbital period (sidereal): 3.33 yr (1,216 d)
- Mean anomaly: 328.58°
- Mean motion: 0° 17^{m} 45.6^{s} / day
- Inclination: 2.4418°
- Longitude of ascending node: 9.0601°
- Argument of perihelion: 262.31°

Physical characteristics
- Mean diameter: 9.037±1.031 km
- Synodic rotation period: 4.8888±0.0003 h
- Geometric albedo: 0.246
- Spectral type: SMASS = S
- Absolute magnitude (H): 12.130±0.001 (R); 12.36; 12.40; 12.5

1729 Beryl, provisional designation 1963 SL, is a stony background asteroid from the Florian region in the inner asteroid belt, approximately 9 kilometers (5.6 miles) in diameter. It was discovered on 19 September 1963, by astronomers at Indiana University during the Indiana Asteroid Program at Goethe Link Observatory in Indiana, United States. The S-type asteroid has a rotation period of 4.9 hours. It was named for Beryl H. Potter, a long-time research assistant of the discovering program.

== Orbit and classification ==
Beryl is a non-family asteroid of the main belt's background population when applying the hierarchical clustering method to its proper orbital elements. Based on osculating Keplerian orbital elements, the asteroid has also been classified as a member of the Flora family (402), a giant asteroid family and the largest family of stony asteroids in the main-belt. It orbits the Sun in the inner asteroid belt at a distance of 2.0–2.5 AU once every 3 years and 4 months (1,216 days; semi-major axis of 2.23 AU). Its orbit has an eccentricity of 0.10 and an inclination of 2° with respect to the ecliptic.

The asteroid was first observed as 1933 ST at Simeiz Observatory in September 1933. The body's observation arc begins with its observation as 1942 EW at Turku Observatory in March 1942, or more than 21 years prior to its official discovery observation at Goethe Link.

== Naming ==
This minor planet was named after Beryl H. Potter (1900–1985), research assistant at the Indiana University, who participated in the program of minor planet observations from 1949 to 1966. During this period, she analysed nearly 6,300 photographic plates, measuring the positions of minor planets and reporting lost asteroids to the International Astronomical Union, which were then published in the Minor Planet Circulars. The official naming citation was published by the Minor Planet Center on 15 July 1968 (M.P.C. 2883).

== Physical characteristics ==
In the SMASS classification, Beryl is a common, stony S-type asteroid.

=== Rotation period ===
In May 2009, a rotational lightcurve of Beryl was obtained from photometric observations by Julian Oey at the Leura (E17) and Kingsgrove (E19) observatories in Australia. Lightcurve analysis gave a rotation period of 4.8888±0.0003 hours and a brightness variation of 0.20 magnitude (U=3). In addition, a nearly identical period of 4.889±0.0014 hours with an amplitude of 0.14 was determined in the R-band by astronomers at the Palomar Transient Factory in October 2010 (U=2).

=== Diameter and albedo ===
According to the survey carried out by the NEOWISE mission of NASA's Wide-field Infrared Survey Explorer, Beryl measures 9.04 kilometers in diameter and its surface has an albedo of 0.246. The Collaborative Asteroid Lightcurve Link assumes an albedo of 0.24 – derived from 8 Flora, the namesake of the Flora Family – and calculates a diameter of 8.58 kilometers based on an absolute magnitude of 12.5.
