= Morgan–Monroe Observatory =

Observatory in Indiana, US

- Organization: Indiana University
- Location: Morgan–Monroe State Forest, Indiana
- Coordinates: 39°18′49″N 86°26′04″W
- Altitude: 245 meters (804 ft)
- Established: 1966
- Website: Morgan–Monroe Observatory

Telescopes
- Roboscope: 0.41 m Cassegrain
- Spectrabot: 1.25 m Ritchey–Chrétien

External images
- http://www.astro.indiana.edu/images/mms.jpg Morgan–Monroe Observatory Source: Indiana University Department of Astronomy.
- http://www.polyweb.com/danno/roboscope/RoboScope_files/roboscope.jpg Roboscope. Source: PolyWeb Services.
- http://www.indiana.edu/~rcapub/v21n2/honey.gif Indiana University astronomy professor R. Kent Honeycutt and Spectrabot. Source: Indiana University, Research & Creative Activity, April 1998, Volume XXI, Number 2.

The Morgan–Monroe Observatory, also known as the Morgan–Monroe Station of Goethe Link Observatory, is an astronomical observatory owned and operated by Indiana University. It is located in Indiana's Morgan–Monroe State Forest approximately 20 kilometers (12 mi) northeast of Bloomington, Indiana (USA). It was developed in the 1960s when light pollution began to degrade the capabilities of the original Goethe Link Observatory, which Indiana University had used for astronomical research since 1948. The original Boller and Chivens 41 cm (16 in) Cassegrain reflector, installed in 1966, was converted in 1989 to an automated system for monitoring cataclysmic variable stars called "Roboscope." It is capable of making one or two 4-minute exposures of about 100 objects per clear night. In 1997, an automated 1.25 m f/8 Ritchey–Chrétien reflector called "Spectrabot" was added.

== See also ==
- List of astronomical observatories
