= 1728 Goethe Link =

Main-belt asteroid

Discovery
- Discovered by: Indiana University (Indiana Asteroid Program)
- Discovery site: Goethe Link Obs.
- Discovery date: 12 October 1964

Designations
- Named after: Dr Goethe Link (observatory's founder)
- Alternative designations: 1964 TO · 1943 OA; 1952 WH · 1955 KE; 1956 VD · 1964 UB; 1967 JD
- Minor planet category: main-belt · (middle)

Orbital characteristics
- Epoch 4 September 2017 (JD 2458000.5)
- Uncertainty parameter 0
- Observation arc: 73.78 yr (26,948 days)
- Aphelion: 2.7923 AU
- Perihelion: 2.3346 AU
- Semi-major axis: 2.5634 AU
- Eccentricity: 0.0893
- Orbital period (sidereal): 4.10 yr (1,499 days)
- Mean anomaly: 22.348°
- Mean motion: 0° 14^{m} 24.36^{s} / day
- Inclination: 7.1866°
- Longitude of ascending node: 240.52°
- Argument of perihelion: 66.733°

Physical characteristics
- Dimensions: 14.58±0.33 km 15.60 km (calculated); 18.18±1.09 km
- Synodic rotation period: 81±2 h
- Geometric albedo: 0.194±0.025; 0.20 (assumed); 0.251±0.032
- Spectral type: S
- Absolute magnitude (H): 11.10 · 11.19±0.27 · 11.30 · 11.4

1728 Goethe Link, provisional designation 1964 TO, is a stony asteroid and relatively slow rotator from the central region of the asteroid belt, approximately 16 kilometers in diameter.

It was discovered on 12 October 1964, by Indiana University during its Indiana Asteroid Program at Goethe Link Observatory in Brooklyn, Indiana, United States. It was named after American philanthropist and founder of the discovering observatory Goethe Link.

== Orbit and classification ==
Goethe Link orbits the Sun in the central main-belt at a distance of 2.3–2.8 AU once every 4 years and 1 month (1,499 days). Its orbit has an eccentricity of 0.09 and an inclination of 7° with respect to the ecliptic. Goethe Link was first identified as 1943 OA at Heidelberg Observatory in 1943, extending the body's observation arc by 21 years prior to its official discovery observation.

== Physical characteristics ==
Goethe Link has been characterized as a common S-type asteroid.

=== Rotation period ===
In October 2005, a rotational lightcurve of Goethe Link was obtained by French amateur astronomer Laurent Bernasconi. It gave a long rotation period of 81 hours with a brightness variation of 0.39 magnitude (U=2).

=== Diameter and albedo ===
According to the surveys carried out the Japanese Akari satellite and NASA's Wide-field Infrared Survey Explorer with its subsequent NEOWISE mission, Goethe Link measures 14.58 and 18.18 kilometers in diameter, and its surface has an albedo of 0.194 and 0.251, respectively. The Collaborative Asteroid Lightcurve Link assumes a standard albedo for stony asteroids of 0.20 and calculates a diameter of 15.60 kilometers with an absolute magnitude of 11.4.

== Naming ==
This minor planet was named in honor of Indianapolis surgeon and philanthropist Dr Goethe Link. He was an enthusiastic amateur astronomer and generous supporter of astronomy, who built the Goethe Link Observatory in the late 1930s and donated it to Indiana University in 1948. The official naming citation was published by the Minor Planet Center on 15 July 1968 (M.P.C. 2882).
