= 1751 Herget =

Asteroid

Discovery
- Discovered by: Indiana University (Indiana Asteroid Program)
- Discovery site: Goethe Link Obs.
- Discovery date: 27 July 1955

Designations
- Named after: Paul Herget (American astronomer)
- Alternative designations: 1955 OC · 1955 QO; 1955 RB · 1955 SP_{1} 1962 CC · 1969 QA
- Minor planet category: main-belt · (middle); Gefion

Orbital characteristics
- Epoch 4 September 2017 (JD 2458000.5)
- Uncertainty parameter 0
- Observation arc: 61.67 yr (22,526 days)
- Aphelion: 3.2765 AU
- Perihelion: 2.3002 AU
- Semi-major axis: 2.7883 AU
- Eccentricity: 0.1751
- Orbital period (sidereal): 4.66 yr (1,701 days)
- Mean anomaly: 78.845°
- Inclination: 8.1315°
- Longitude of ascending node: 240.27°
- Argument of perihelion: 130.93°

Physical characteristics
- Dimensions: 10.929±0.248 km 23.21 km (calculated)
- Synodic rotation period: 3.937±0.001 h 3.9397±0.0006 h
- Geometric albedo: 0.195±0.027; 0.057 (assumed)
- Spectral type: SMASS = S · C
- Absolute magnitude (H): 11.80±0.05 · 11.9 · 12.06±0.41 · 12.2

1751 Herget, provisional designation 1955 OC, is a stony Gefionian asteroid from the central region of the asteroid belt, approximately 11 kilometers in diameter.

It was discovered on 27 July 1955, by IU's Indiana Asteroid Program at Goethe Link Observatory near Brooklyn, Indiana, United States. The asteroid was named after American astronomer Paul Herget.

== Classification and orbit ==
Herget is a member of the large Gefion family of asteroids (516). It orbits the Sun in the central main-belt at a distance of 2.3–3.3 AU once every 4 years and 8 months (1,701 days; semi-major axis of 2.79 AU). Its orbit has an eccentricity of 0.18 and an inclination of 8° with respect to the ecliptic. As no precoveries were taken, and no prior identifications were made, the body's observation arc begins with its official discovery observation at Goethe Link in 1955.

== Physical characteristics ==
In the SMASS classification, Herget has been characterized as a common S-type asteroid, which agrees with the overall spectral type of the Gefion family.

=== Diameter and albedo ===
According to the survey carried out by NASA's Wide-field Infrared Survey Explorer with its subsequent NEOWISE mission, Herget measures 10.93 kilometers in diameter, and its surface has an albedo of 0.195, while the Collaborative Asteroid Lightcurve Link assumes a standard albedo for carbonaceous asteroids of 0.057 and calculates a diameter of 23.21 kilometers with an absolute magnitude of 11.9, as the lower the body's albedo (reflectivity), the larger its diameter.

=== Rotation period ===
In November 2016, two rotational lightcurves of Herget were obtained from photometric observations by Italian astronomers Lorenzo Franco and Alessandro Marchini, as well as by French amateur astronomer René Roy. Lightcurve analysis gave a rotation period of 3.937 and 3.9397 hours with a brightness amplitude of 0.30 and 0.31 magnitude, respectively (U=3-/3).

== Naming ==
This minor planet was named in honor of American astronomer Paul Herget (1908–1981), who was director of the Cincinnati Observatory and distinguished service professor in the University of Cincinnati.

Herget was also founder of the Minor Planet Center (MPC) in 1947, pioneer in the application of high speed computers to astronomical problems, member of the U.S. National Academy of Sciences, and past president of IAU's Commission 20 (Positions & Motions of Minor Planets, Comets & Satellites). The official naming citation was published by the MPC on 20 February 1971 (M.P.C. 3143).
