= 1971 Hagihara =

Main-belt asteroid

Discovery
- Discovered by: Indiana University (Indiana Asteroid Program)
- Discovery site: Goethe Link Obs.
- Discovery date: 14 September 1955

Designations
- Named after: Yusuke Hagihara (astronomer)
- Alternative designations: 1955 RD_{1} · 1971 TZ_{2}
- Minor planet category: main-belt · (outer); Eos

Orbital characteristics
- Epoch 4 September 2017 (JD 2458000.5)
- Uncertainty parameter 0
- Observation arc: 59.65 yr (21,787 days)
- Aphelion: 3.2479 AU
- Perihelion: 2.7370 AU
- Semi-major axis: 2.9924 AU
- Eccentricity: 0.0854
- Orbital period (sidereal): 5.18 yr (1,891 days)
- Mean anomaly: 294.31°
- Mean motion: 0° 11^{m} 25.44^{s} / day
- Inclination: 8.6990°
- Longitude of ascending node: 300.12°
- Argument of perihelion: 120.50°

Physical characteristics
- Dimensions: 12.289±0.156; 15±7 km (converted)
- Geometric albedo: 0.135±0.028
- Absolute magnitude (H): 12.3

1971 Hagihara, provisional designation 1955 RD_{1}, is an Eoan asteroid from the outer region of the asteroid belt, approximately 12 kilometers in diameter.

It was discovered on 14 September 1955, by the Indiana Asteroid Program at the Goethe Link Observatory near Brooklyn, Indiana, United States. It was later named after Japanese astronomer Yusuke Hagihara.

== Orbit and classification ==
Hagihara is a member of the Eos family (606), the largest asteroid family in the outer main belt consisting of nearly 10,000 asteroids. It orbits the Sun in the outer main-belt at a distance of 2.7–3.2 AU once every 5 years and 2 months (1,891 days). Its orbit has an eccentricity of 0.09 and an inclination of 9° with respect to the ecliptic. The asteroid's observation arc begins with its discovery observation at Goethe in September 1955.

== Physical characteristics ==
According to the survey carried out by NASA's Wide-field Infrared Survey Explorer with its subsequent NEOWISE mission, Hagihara measures 12.3 kilometers in diameter and its surface has an albedo of 0.135, which is neither typical for stony nor for carbonaceous bodies. As of 2017, the asteroid's composition and spectral type, as well as its rotation period and shape remain unknown.

== Naming ==
This minor planet was named in honour of Yusuke Hagihara (1897–1979) on the occasion of his 81st birthday. He was professor of astronomy at the University of Tokyo and director of the Tokyo Observatory. He also served as vice-president of the International Astronomical Union and was the president of its Commission VII.

Hagihara is best known for the discussion of stability problems in celestial mechanics and his theory of libratory motions, as well as for important contributions to the study of the velocity distribution of free electrons in planetary nebulae, and his important five-volume treatise on celestial mechanics. The official naming citation was published by the Minor Planet Center on 1 August 1978 (M.P.C. 4419).
