= Kirkwood Observatory =

Observatory in Indiana, US

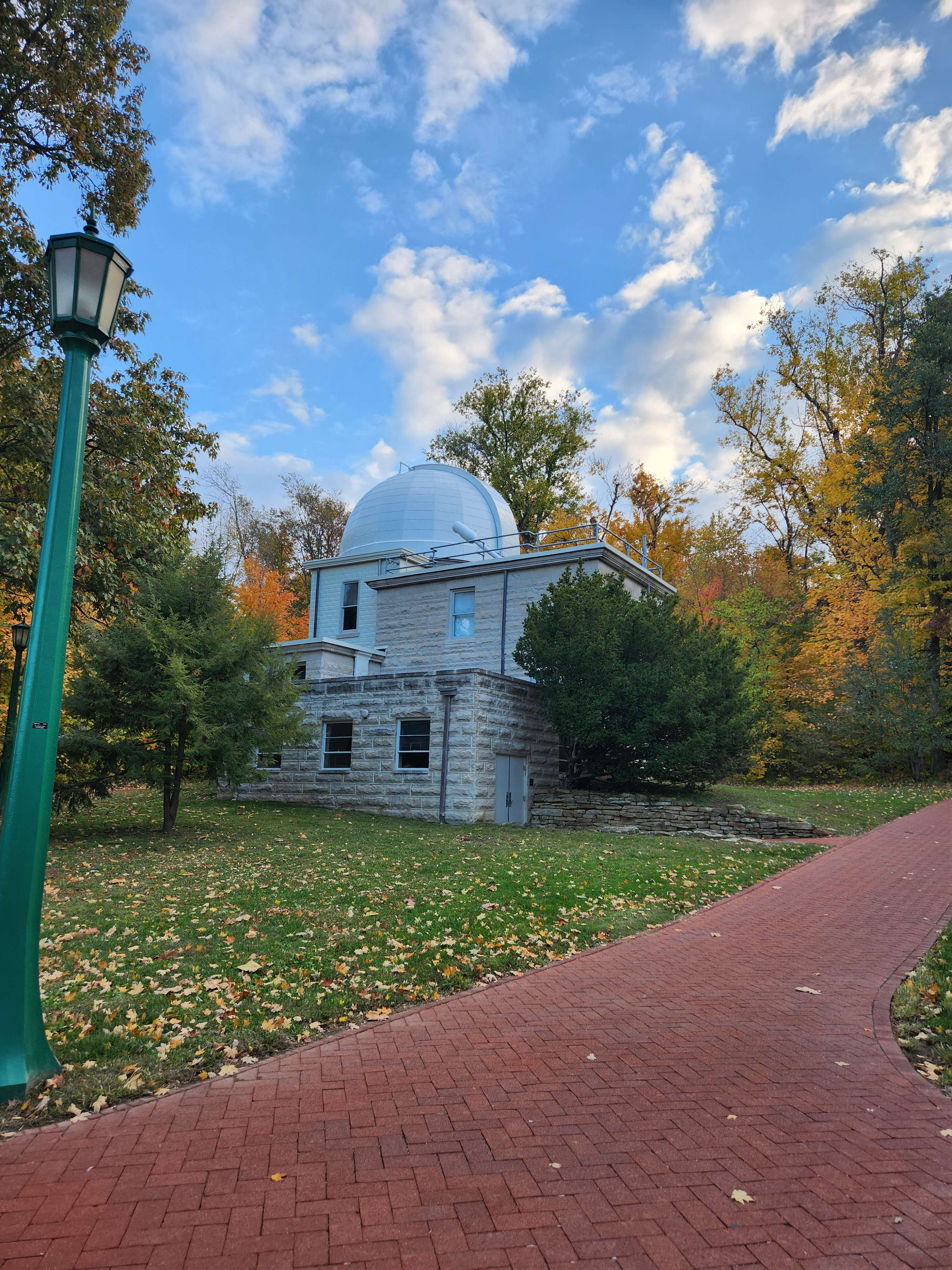
- Organization: Indiana University
- Location: Bloomington, Indiana, U.S.A.
- Coordinates: 39°09′57″N 86°31′34″W
- Altitude: 235 m (771 ft)
- Weather: See the Clear Sky Clock
- Established: 1901; 125 years ago
- Website: www.astro.indiana.edu

Telescopes
- Warner & Swasey: 0.3-meter (12-inch) refractor
- Solar telescope: heliostat, spectrograph, digital hydrogen-alpha imaging
- Related media on Commons

Kirkwood Observatory is an astronomical observatory owned and operated by Indiana University. It is located in Bloomington, Indiana, United States. It is named for Daniel Kirkwood (1814–1895) an astronomer and professor of mathematics at Indiana University who discovered the divisions of the asteroid belt known as the Kirkwood Gaps.

== Description ==
Built in 1900 and dedicated on May 15, 1901, the observatory was thoroughly renovated during the 2001–02 academic year. Although the facility is no longer used for research, its original refracting telescope, built by Warner & Swasey Company with a 12-inch (0.3-meter) Brashear objective lens, also received a complete restoration. The telescope is now used regularly for outreach events and undergraduate-level classes. Kirkwood Observatory also has an instructional solar telescope.

=== Directors ===
- John A. Miller (1901–06)
- Wilbur A. Cogshall (1907–44)
- Frank K. Edmondson (1944–78)

== See also ==
- 1764 Cogshall, asteroid named after W. A. Cogshall
- List of observatories
