= Indiana Asteroid Program =

Minor planets discovered: 119
see § List of discovered minor planets

The Indiana Asteroid Program was a photographic astronomical survey of asteroids during 1949–1967, at the U.S. Goethe Link Observatory near Brooklyn, Indiana. The program was initiated by Frank K. Edmondson of Indiana University using a 10-inch f/6.5 Cooke triplet astrographic camera.

Its objectives included recovering asteroids that were far from their predicted positions, making new orbital calculations or revising old ones, deriving magnitudes accurate to about 0.1 mag, and training students.

When the observatory's 36-inch (0.91-meter) reflecting telescope proved unsuitable for searching for asteroids, postdoctoral fellow James Cuffey arranged the permanent loan of a 10-inch (25-centimeter) lens from the University of Cincinnati. Mounted in a shed near the main observatory, the instrument using the borrowed lens was responsible for all of the program's discoveries.

By 1958, the program had produced 3,500 photographic plates showing 12,000 asteroid images and had published about 2,000 accurate positions in the Minor Planet Circular. When the program ended in 1967, it had discovered a total of 119 asteroids. The program's highest numbered discovery, 30718 Records, made in 1955, was not named until November 2007 (M.P.C. 61269).

The program ended when the lights of the nearby city of Indianapolis became too bright to permit the long exposures required for the photographic plates. The program's nearly 7,000 photographic plates are now archived at Lowell Observatory.

== List of discovered minor planets ==
The Indiana Asteroid Program has discovered 119 asteroids during 1949–1966. The Minor Planet Center officially credits these discoveries to "Indiana University" rather than to the program itself.

1575 Winifred	20 April 1950
1578 Kirkwood	10 January 1951
1602 Indiana	14 March 1950
1615 Bardwell	28 January 1950
1721 Wells	3 October 1953
1728 Goethe Link	12 October 1964
1729 Beryl	19 September 1963
1741 Giclas	26 January 1960
1746 Brouwer	14 September 1963
1751 Herget	27 July 1955
1761 Edmondson	30 March 1952
1762 Russell	8 October 1953
1763 Williams	13 October 1953
1764 Cogshall	7 November 1953
1765 Wrubel	15 December 1957
1766 Slipher	7 September 1962
1767 Lampland	7 September 1962
1788 Kiess	25 July 1952
1798 Watts	4 April 1949
1799 Koussevitzky	25 July 1950
1822 Waterman	25 July 1950
1824 Haworth	30 March 1952
1826 Miller	14 September 1955
1827 Atkinson	7 September 1962
1852 Carpenter	1 April 1955

1853 McElroy	15 December 1957
1952 Hesburgh	3 May 1951
1953 Rupertwildt	29 October 1951
1955 McMath	22 September 1963
1971 Hagihara	14 September 1955
1988 Delores	28 September 1952
1994 Shane	4 October 1961
1996 Adams	16 October 1961
1997 Leverrier	14 September 1963
2007 McCuskey	22 September 1963
2023 Asaph	16 September 1952
2024 McLaughlin	23 October 1952
2026 Cottrell	30 March 1955
2059 Baboquivari	16 October 1963
2065 Spicer	9 September 1959
2069 Hubble	29 March 1955
2070 Humason	14 October 1964
2086 Newell	20 January 1966
2110 Moore-Sitterly	7 September 1962
2160 Spitzer	7 September 1956
2161 Grissom	17 October 1963
2165 Young	7 September 1956
2168 Swope	14 September 1955
2182 Semirot	21 March 1953
2196 Ellicott	29 January 1965

2227 Otto Struve	13 September 1955
2300 Stebbins	10 October 1953
2301 Whitford	20 November 1965
2322 Kitt Peak	28 October 1954
2326 Tololo	29 August 1965
2334 Cuffey	27 April 1962
2351 O'Higgins	3 November 1964
2405 Welch	18 October 1963
2417 McVittie	15 February 1964
2466 Golson	7 September 1959
2488 Bryan	23 October 1952
2496 Fernandus	8 October 1953
2516 Roman	6 November 1964
2528 Mohler	8 October 1953
2624 Samitchell	7 September 1962
2641 Lipschutz	4 April 1949
2653 Principia	4 November 1964
2751 Campbell	7 September 1962
2753 Duncan	18 February 1966
2775 Odishaw	14 October 1953
2842 Unsold	25 July 1950
2848 ASP	8 November 1959
2853 Harvill	14 September 1963
2974 Holden	23 August 1955
2996 Bowman	5 September 1954

3070 Aitken	4 April 1949
3145 Walter Adams	14 September 1955
3167 Babcock	13 September 1955
3180 Morgan	7 September 1962
3185 Clintford	11 November 1953
3282 Spencer Jones	19 February 1949
3363 Bowen	6 March 1960
3371 Giacconi	14 September 1955
3428 Roberts	1 May 1952
3433 Fehrenbach	15 October 1963
3447 Burckhalter	29 September 1956
3474 Linsley	27 April 1962
3520 Klopsteg	16 September 1952
3572 Leogoldberg	28 October 1954
3654 AAS	21 August 1949
3717 Thorenia	15 February 1964
3882 Johncox	7 September 1962
3959 Irwin	28 October 1954
3961 Arthurcox	31 July 1962
4045 Lowengrub	9 September 1953
4046 Swain	7 October 1953
4048 Samwestfall	30 October 1964
4299 WIYN	28 August 1952
4300 Marg Edmondson	18 September 1955
4388 Jurgenstock	3 November 1964

4423 Golden	4 April 1949
4463 Marschwarzschild	28 October 1954
4911 Rosenzweig	16 October 1953
4912 Emilhaury	11 November 1953
5074 Goetzoertel	24 August 1949
5536 Honeycutt	23 August 1955
5567 Durisen	21 March 1953
5568 Mufson	14 October 1953
7001 Noether	14 March 1955
7368 Haldancohn	20 January 1966
7723 Lugger	28 August 1952
8059 Deliyannis	6 May 1957
8320 van Zee	13 September 1955
9143 Burkhead	16 September 1955
9144 Hollisjohnson	25 October 1955
9260 Edwardolson	8 October 1953
9261 Peggythomson	8 October 1953
19912 Aurapenenta	14 September 1955
30718 Records	14 September 1955

External images
- http://newsinfo.iu.edu/pub/libs/images/usr/4718.jpg Professor Frank Edmondson manipulates the 10-inch lens telescope at the Goethe Link Observatory in Brooklyn, Indiana, in the 1950s. Source: Indiana University News Bureau.
- http://newsinfo.iu.edu/pub/libs/images/usr/4719.jpg Professor Frank Edmondson looks on as Esther Barnhart -- wife of Philip Barnhart (M.A. Astronomy 1955) -- takes precise measurements of an asteroid's location. By comparing locations of an asteroid on different plates taken an hour apart, its orbit could be calculated. Source: Indiana University News Bureau.
