= Yusuke Hagihara =

Japanese celestial mechanician

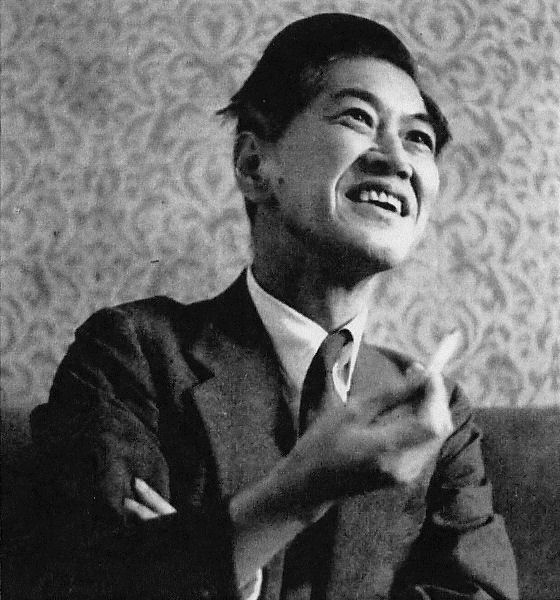
- Hagihara in 1954
- Born: 28 March 1897; Osaka, Japan
- Died: 29 January 1979 (aged 81); Tokyo, Japan
- Education: Tokyo Imperial University (BSc 1921); University of Tokyo (D.Sc. 1930)
- Scientific career
- Fields: Astronomy; Celestial mechanics
- Workplaces: University of Tokyo; Tokyo Astronomical Observatory; Japan Academy
- Notable students: Yoshio Fujita

Yusuke Hagihara (萩原 雄祐, Hagihara Yūsuke; 28 March 1897 in Osaka – 29 January 1979 in Tokyo) was a Japanese astronomer noted for his contributions to celestial mechanics.

== Life and work ==
Hagihara graduated from Tokyo Imperial University with a degree in astronomy in 1921 and became an assistant professor of astronomy there two years later. In 1923 the Japanese government sent him abroad as a traveling scholar. Hagihara went to Cambridge University in England to study differential equations under the mathematician Henry Frederick Baker and relativity alongside Paul Dirac under the astrophysicist Sir Arthur Stanley Eddington. He was a visiting scholar in France, Germany, and the United States.

He returned to Japan in 1925 but left for the United States three years later to study the topology of dynamical systems at Harvard University under George David Birkhoff on a Rockefeller Foundation Fellowship.

Hagihara finished his studies at Harvard in 1929 and returned again to the University of Tokyo, where, in 1930, he completed a D.Sc. dissertation on the stability of satellite systems. In 1935, he published a paper showing that the trajectory of a test particle in the Schwarzschild metric can be expressed in terms of elliptic functions. For more than a decade after 1937, he investigated the distribution of electron velocities in planetary nebulae.

He was promoted to full professor at the University of Tokyo in 1935. From 1945 to 1957 he was the director of the Tokyo Astronomical Observatory and subsequently was a professor at Tohoku University (1957–1960) and president of Utsunomiya University (1961–1967). In 1961 he was elected vice-president of the International Astronomical Union and president of the IAU's commission on celestial mechanics.

He retired from all of his official duties, except for the Japan Academy, in 1967 and devoted himself to writing his comprehensive five volume work, Celestial Mechanics, which was based on his lecture notes.

Hagihara was regarded as a quiet and cultured gentleman, an excellent teacher and a capable administrator.

He has pointed out the importance of the post-Newton models for celestial mechanics, namely that developed by Georgi Manev.

== Honors ==
- The main-belt asteroid 1971 Hagihara was named in his honor.
- Fellow of the Royal Astronomical Society
- Chairman of the National Committee of Astronomy (Japan)
- Member Japan Academy
- Member Science Council of Japan
- Order of Cultural Merit (Japan)
- Recipient of the James Craig Watson Medal from the U.S. National Academy of Science (1960)

== Works ==
- Hagihara, Yusuke (1970). Celestial mechanics : Dynamical principles and transformation theory (vol. 1). Cambridge: MIT Press. ISBN 978-0-262-08037-8.
- Hagihara, Yusuke (1972). Celestial mechanics: Perturbation theory (vol. 2, parts 1 and 2). Cambridge: MIT Press.
- Hagihara, Yusuke (1975). Celestial mechanics: Differential equations in celestial mechanics (vol. 3, parts 1 and 2). Tokyo: Japan Society For the Promotion of Science.
- Hagihara, Yusuke (1976). Celestial mechanics: Periodic and quasi-periodic solutions (vol. 4, parts 1 and 2). Tokyo: Japan Society For the Promotion of Science.
- Hagihara, Yusuke (1977). Celestial mechanics: Topology of the three-body problem (vol. 5, parts 1 and 2). Tokyo: Japan Society For the Promotion of Science.
- Hagihara, Yusuke (1971). Theories of equilibrium figures of a rotating homogeneous fluid mass. Washington, D.C.: U. S. Government Printing Office. NAS 1.21:186.

== See also ==
- Schwarzschild geodesics
- List of contributors to general relativity
