= Morgan–Monroe State Forest =

State forest in Morgan County and Monroe County, Indiana, U.S.

Morgan–Monroe State State Forest
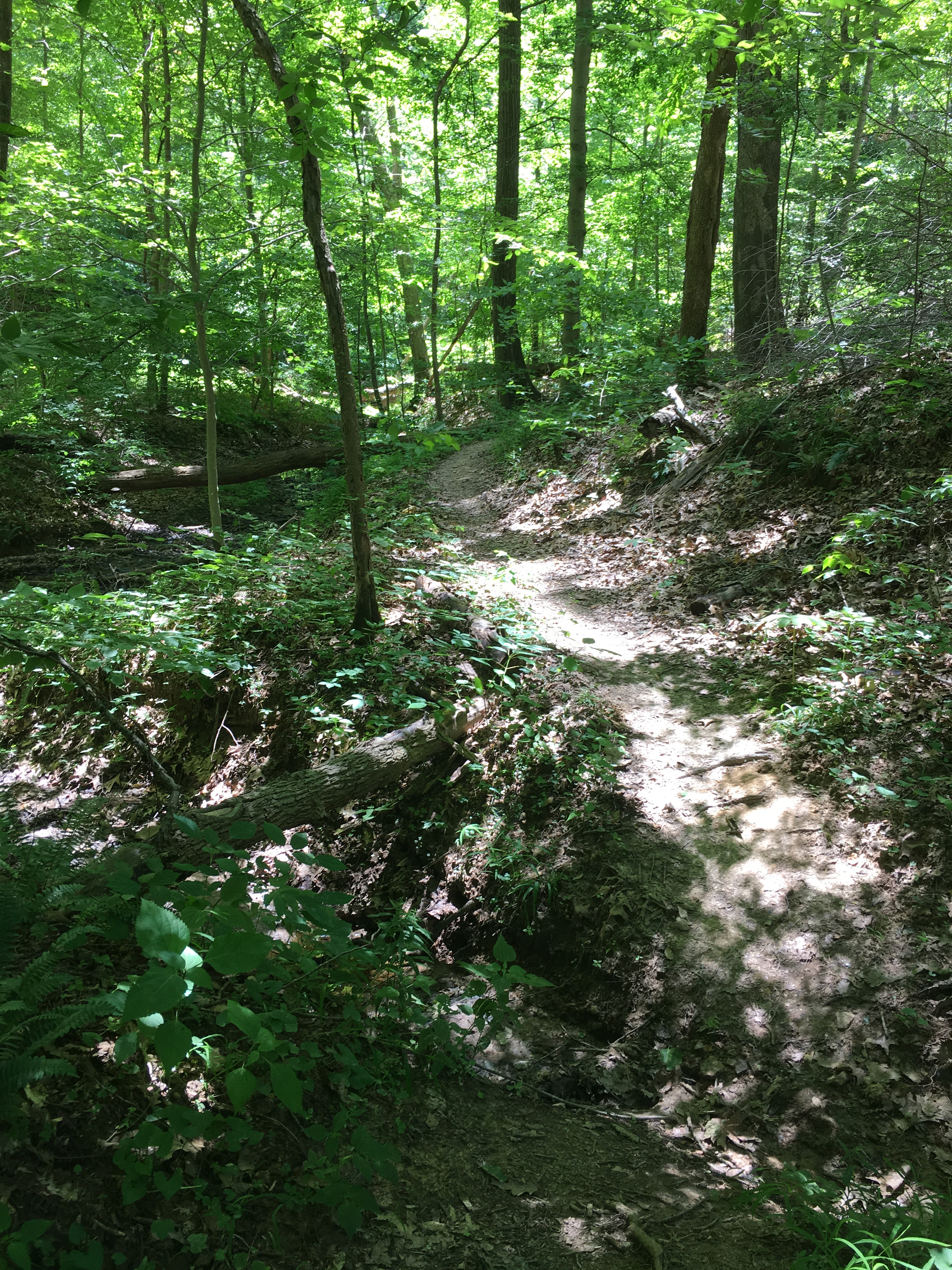
- Morgan-Monroe State Forest, June 2017

- Location within Indiana
- Location: Morgan County and Monroe County, Indiana, USA
- Nearest city: Martinsville, Indiana
- Coordinates: 39°19′16″N 86°24′48″W
- Area: 24,000 acres (97.12 km^{2})
- Established: 1929
- Governing body: Indiana Department of Natural Resources
- Website: www.in.gov/dnr/forestry/properties/morgan-monroe-state-forest/

Morgan–Monroe State Forest is a state forest in Morgan County and Monroe County of Indiana, and is the second largest state forest in Indiana. The 24,000 acres (97 km^{2}) comprising this deciduous forest was abandoned farmland, as the previous residents realized that the land's rocky soil was very poor for agricultural purposes. In 1929 the state of Indiana purchased the land to prevent further erosion and to create the state forest.

Indiana's first Civilian Conservation Corps camp was in Morgan–Monroe State Forest in May 1933. The fire tower for the forest is no longer usable, but in 1999 was placed on the National Register of Historic Places.

An AmeriFLUX/FLUXNET tower, for the purpose of measuring water, carbon dioxide, and heat levels in a mixed hardwood ecosystem, is located within the forest. This tower is maintained by Indiana University's Department of Geography.

Recreation activities include four hiking trails, camping, fishing and a biking trail. Hunting in the state forest is for deer, fox, ruffed grouse, raccoon, squirrel, and turkey. Another highlight is the Draper Cabin, which is one hundred years old and may be rented overnight.

Cherry Lake is noted for its fishing. There are three lakes in the forest. One of the lakes, Beanblossum, is dry due to a dam failure in November 1993.

Morgan–Monroe State Forest, along with nearby Yellowwood State Forest, are among the very few places in Indiana where one can pan for gold, although a free permit is required first before doing any prospecting.

Indiana University's Morgan-Monroe Observatory is located in the Morgan–Monroe State Forest.
