= Goethe Link Observatory =

Observatory in Indiana, US

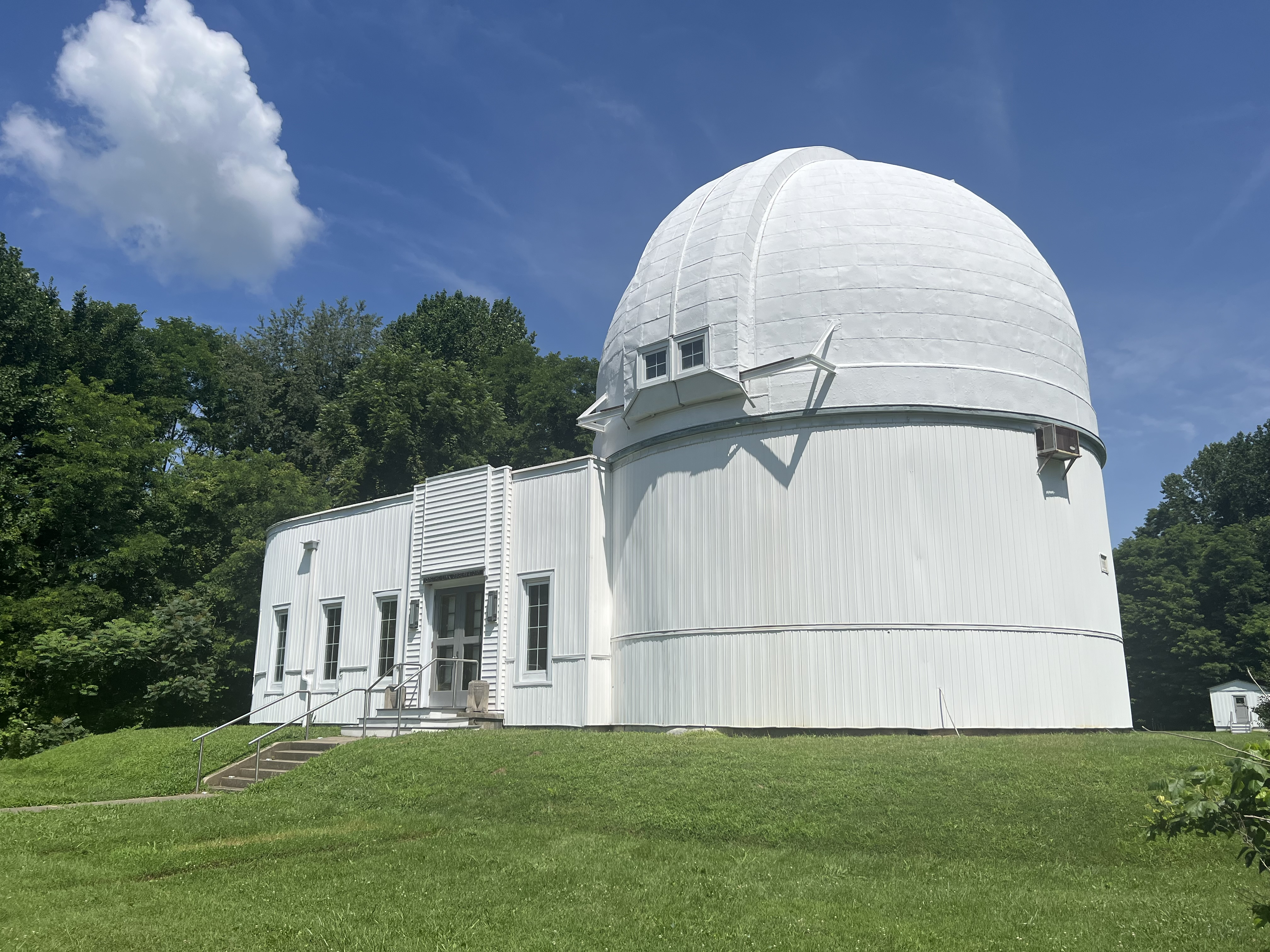
- Goethe Link Observatory, July 2025
- Organization: Indiana University (Indiana Astronomical Society)
- Observatory code: 760
- Location: Brooklyn, Indiana, U.S.
- Coordinates: 39°33′00″N 86°23′42″W
- Altitude: 293 metres (962 ft)
- Weather: Clear Sky Clock
- Established: 1939
- Website: iasindy.org/link.html

Telescopes
- Nasmyth–Cassegrain: 0.91 m (36-inch) f/10.0
- Astrograph Decommissioned: 255 mm (10-inch) f/6.5 Cooke triplet
- Schmidt-Cassegrain: 355.6 mm (14-inch) f/11.0 Celestron SCT

The Goethe Link Observatory, observatory code 760, is an astronomical observatory near Brooklyn, Indiana, United States. It is owned by Indiana University and operated by the Indiana Astronomical Society, which efforts are dedicated to the pursuit of amateur astronomy.

Observatory Address: 8403 Observatory Ln, Martinsville, IN 46151.

Hours: During and after General Meetings of the Indiana Astronomical Society (IAS).

It is named for an amateur astronomer Dr. Goethe Link, an Indianapolis surgeon, who built it with his private funds. Construction of the observatory started in 1937, and the telescope was first operated in 1939. In 1948, he donated the observatory to Indiana University.

From 1949 until 1966, the Indiana Asteroid Program was conducted at Goethe Link, using a 10-inch Cooke triplet astrograph (f/6.5). The program resulted in the discovery of 119 asteroids, which were credited by the Minor Planet Center to "Indiana University".

When light pollution began to degrade the Goethe Link Observatory's capabilities in the 1960s, Indiana University built a new facility in the Morgan–Monroe State Forest officially designated as the Morgan–Monroe Station (MMS) of the Goethe Link Observatories. IU operated that facility through about 2014. Today, Indiana University primarily uses the WIYN 3.5-m and 0.9-m telescopes located at the Kitt Peak National Observatory near Tucson, AZ for ongoing research.

The naming of the two main-belt asteroids, 1602 Indiana and 1728 Goethe Link – both discovered at Goethe Link Observatory in 1950 and 1964, respectively – is related to the Observatory and its parent institution.

== See also ==
- List of astronomical observatories
