= Anville =

Anville may refer to:

- Jean-Baptiste Bourguignon d'Anville, an 18th-century geographical author
- Anville (crater), a crater on the Moon
- Anville, Charente, a commune in France
