= Zahringer (surname) =

Zahringer is a surname. Notable people with the surname include:

- George Zahringer (born 1953), American golfer and stockbroker
- Joseph Zähringer (1929–1970), German physicist
- Klaus Zähringer (born 1939), German sport shooter
