= Zähringer (crater) =

Crater on the Moon

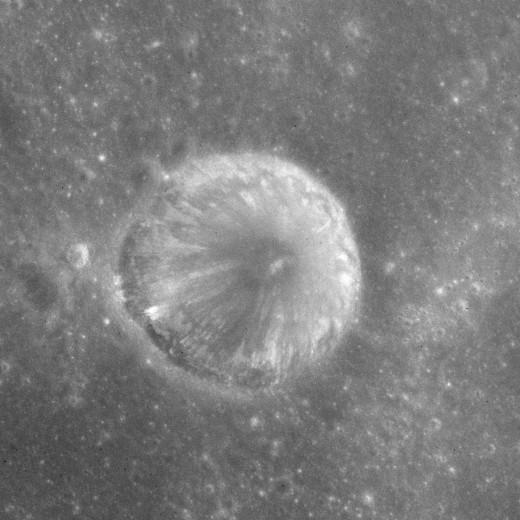
- Apollo 15 mapping camera image
- Coordinates: 5.6°N 40.2°W
- Diameter: 11 km
- Depth: 2.1 km
- Colongitude: 320° at sunrise
- Eponym: Joseph Zähringer

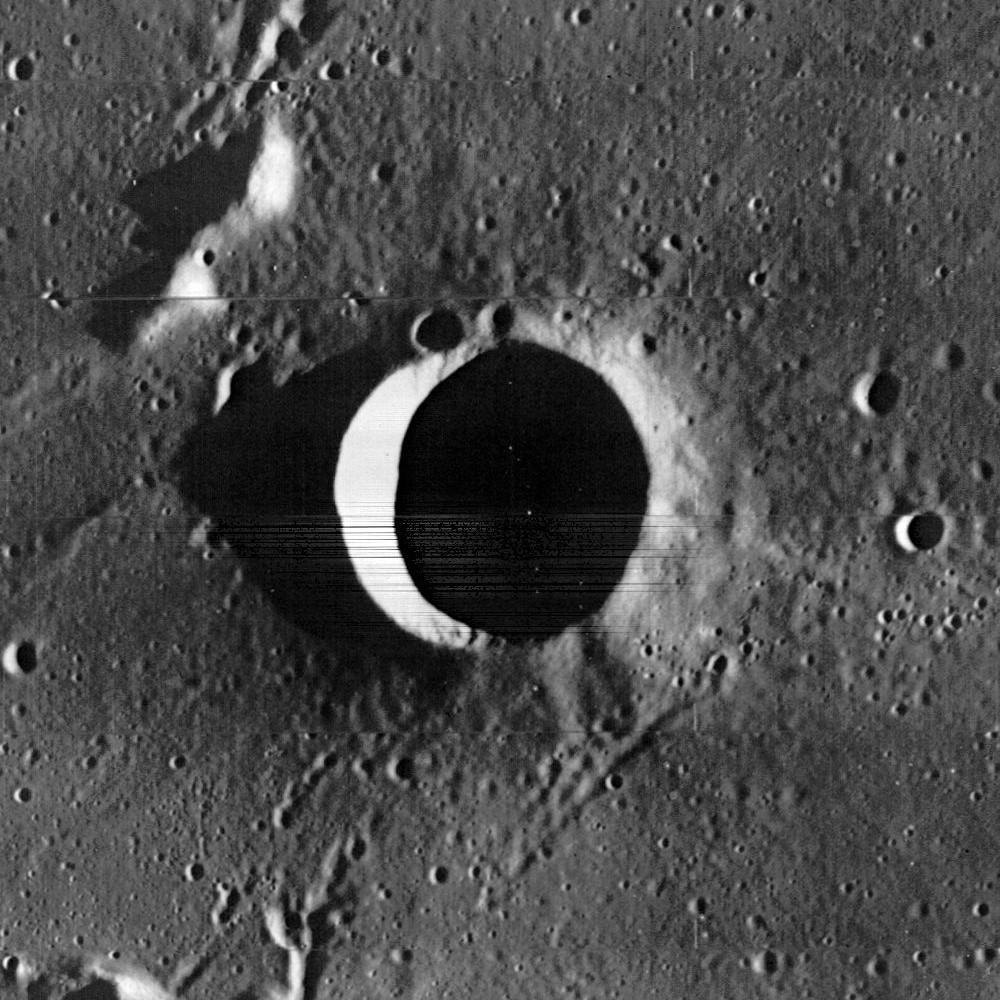
Lunar Orbiter 1 image

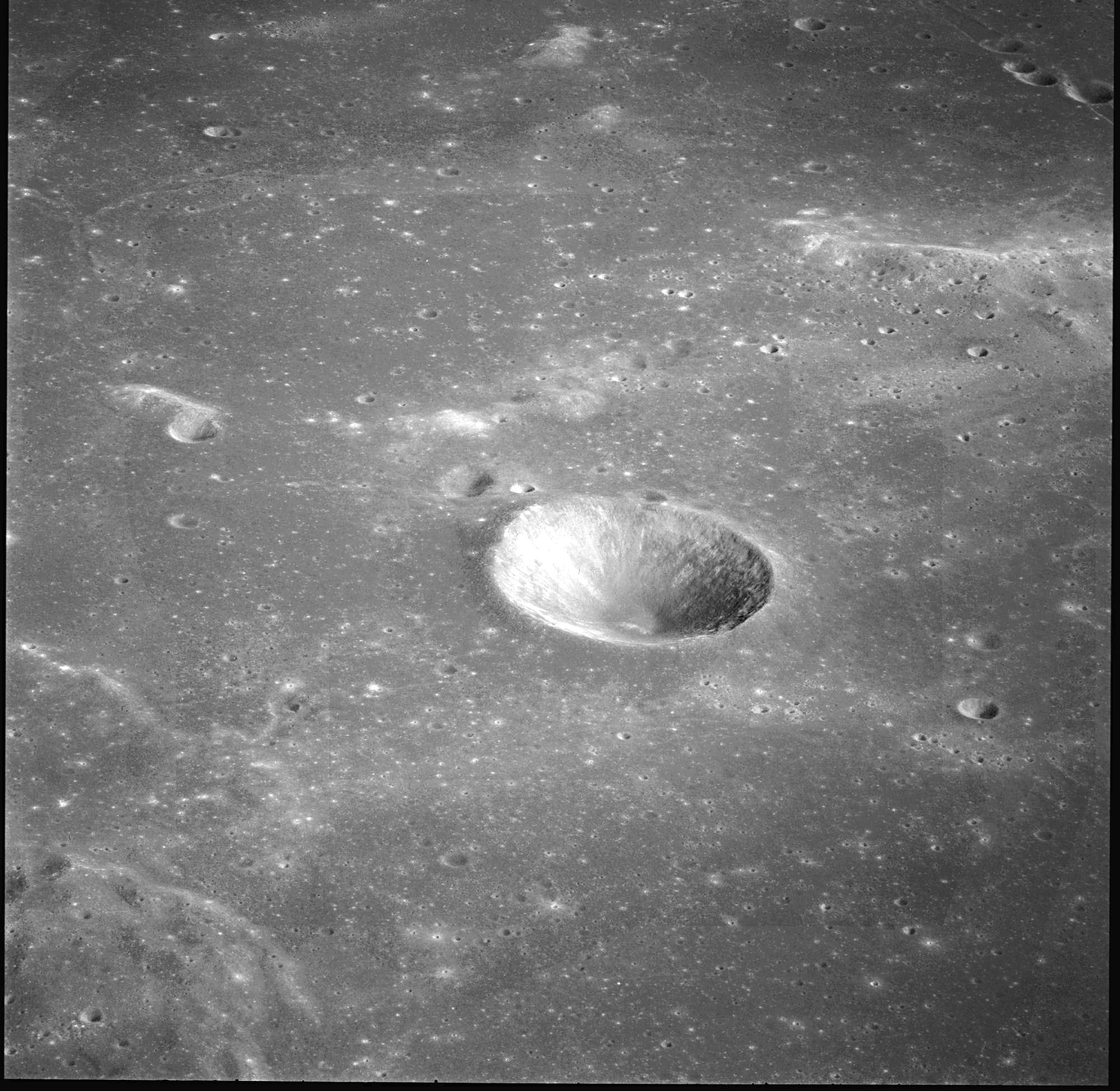
Oblique view from Apollo 10

Zähringer is a small lunar impact crater located near the southeast fringes of Mare Tranquillitatis. To the northeast is the flooded crater Lawrence, and to the southeast are the Montes Secchi mountains and the crater Secchi. Farther to the east lies Taruntius. Zähringer is a circular, bowl-shaped formation with a small interior floor at the midpoint of the sloping inner walls. It is not markedly worn by subsequent impacts.

This crater was previously identified as Taruntius E before being named by the IAU.
