= Tarutia gens =

Ancient Roman family

The gens Tarutia, also found as Tarrutia, was an obscure plebeian family at ancient Rome. Few members of this gens are mentioned in Roman history, of whom the best-known is probably Lucius Tarutius Firmanus, a noted mathematician and astrologer of the first century BC.

== Origin ==
The nomen Tarutius is of Etruscan origin.

== Branches and cognomina ==
Firmanus, the cognomen of the mathematician Lucius Tarutius, was derived from his original home of Firmum in Picenum.

== Members ==
This list includes abbreviated praenomina. For an explanation of this practice, see filiation.

- Lucius Tarutius Firmanus, a friend of both Varro and Cicero, was a mathematician and astrologer. Varro consulted him regarding the life of Romulus, and Firmanus cast the ancient king's horoscope. He concluded that Romulus was born September 23, in the second year of the second Olympiad, 771 BC, and that Rome was founded on April 9. Varro rejected the later date in favour of the traditional celebration of Rome's founding on the Palilia, April 21.
- Tarutia C. l. Medona, a freedwoman buried at Barium in Apulia in a tomb built by the freedman Gaius Tarutius Philomusus for himself, Tarutia, and a third person named Acratus, dating from the early first century.
- Gaius Tarutius C. l. Philomusus, a freedman who built a tomb at Barium for himself, the freedwoman Tarutia Medona, and a third person named Acratus, dating from the early first century.
- Tarutius, named on a cinerarium from Altinum in Venetia and Histria, dating from the early first century.
- Lucius Tarutius, named on a cinerarium at Altinum, dating from the early first century.
- Quintus Tarrutius Tranquillinus, one of several men entrusted with the maintenance of Rome's fountains in AD 141.
- Tarutius Victor, together with Didius Valerianus, one of the heirs of Aulus Valerius Cassianus, a soldier buried at Blera in Etruria. He and Didius built a tomb for Valerius, dating between the beginning of the second century, and the late third century.
- Tarutius, named in a sepulchral inscription from Rome, dating from the first half of the fourth century.
- Tarutius, named in a sepulchral inscription from Rome, dating from the latter half of the fourth century.

=== Undated Tarutii ===
- Tarutia, named in a sepulchral inscription from Aquileia in Venetia and Histria.
- Tarutius, named in an inscription from Maglona in Britain.

== See also ==
- List of Roman gentes

== Bibliography ==
- Marcus Tullius Cicero, De Divinatione.
- Lucius Mestrius Plutarchus (Plutarch), Lives of the Noble Greeks and Romans; "Quaestiones Romanae" (Roman Questions).
- Dictionary of Greek and Roman Biography and Mythology, William Smith, ed., Little, Brown and Company, Boston (1849).
- Theodor Mommsen et alii, Corpus Inscriptionum Latinarum (The Body of Latin Inscriptions, abbreviated CIL), Berlin-Brandenburgische Akademie der Wissenschaften (1853–present).
- Giovanni Battista de Rossi, Inscriptiones Christianae Urbis Romanae Septimo Saeculo Antiquiores (Christian Inscriptions from Rome of the First Seven Centuries, abbreviated ICUR), Vatican Library, Rome (1857–1861, 1888).
- René Cagnat et alii, L'Année épigraphique (The Year in Epigraphy, abbreviated AE), Presses Universitaires de France (1888–present).
- The Roman Inscriptions of Britain (abbreviated RIB), Oxford, (1990–present).
- Giovanni Battista Brusin, Inscriptiones Aquileiae (Inscriptions of Aquileia), Udine (1991–1993).
