= Pyroclastic flow =

Fast-moving current of hot gas and volcanic matter that moves away from a volcano

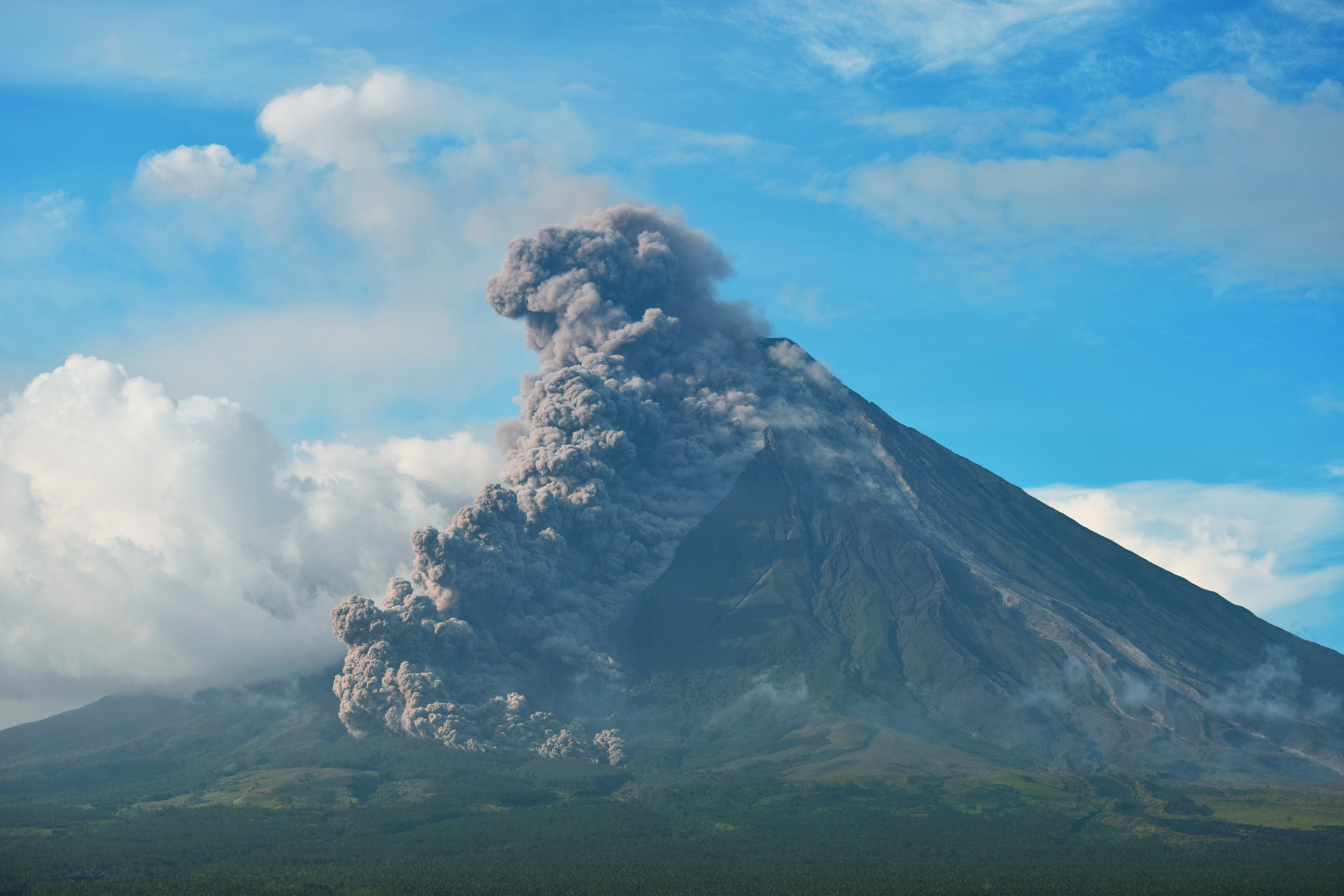
Pyroclastic flows sweep down the flanks of Mayon Volcano, Philippines, in 2018

A pyroclastic flow, more broadly known as a pyroclastic density current, is a fast-moving current of hot gas and volcanic matter (collectively known as tephra) that flows along the ground away from a volcano. Pyroclastic currents travel at extremely high speeds and have extremely high temperatures.

Pyroclastic flows are the deadliest of all volcanic hazards and are produced as a result of certain explosive eruptions. They normally touch the ground and hurtle downhill or spread laterally under gravity. Their speed depends upon the density of the current, the volcanic output rate, and the gradient of the slope.

Upon the eruption of volcanic matter, much of the material sinks to the ground and flows along it, forming a pyroclastic current. Currents are composed of a continuum of materials, spanning from denser, comparatively cooler rocks to warmer, lighter ashes and gasses. Denser rocks are more likely to be influenced by gravity, becoming separated from lighter ashes and gasses that continue flowing across the surrounding ground and air. The denser components of pyroclastic currents are what is specifically meant when referring to pyroclastic flow, whereas the lighter components of pyroclastic currents are known as pyroclastic surges.

In certain cases, pyroclastic density currents can flow over water, with its denser constituents sinking into and mixing with it. Waters can even recede as a result of land production from the mass and volume flux of pyroclastic currents. Additionally, pyroclastic currents can be observed on other astronomical bodies, such as the moon.

== Etymology ==
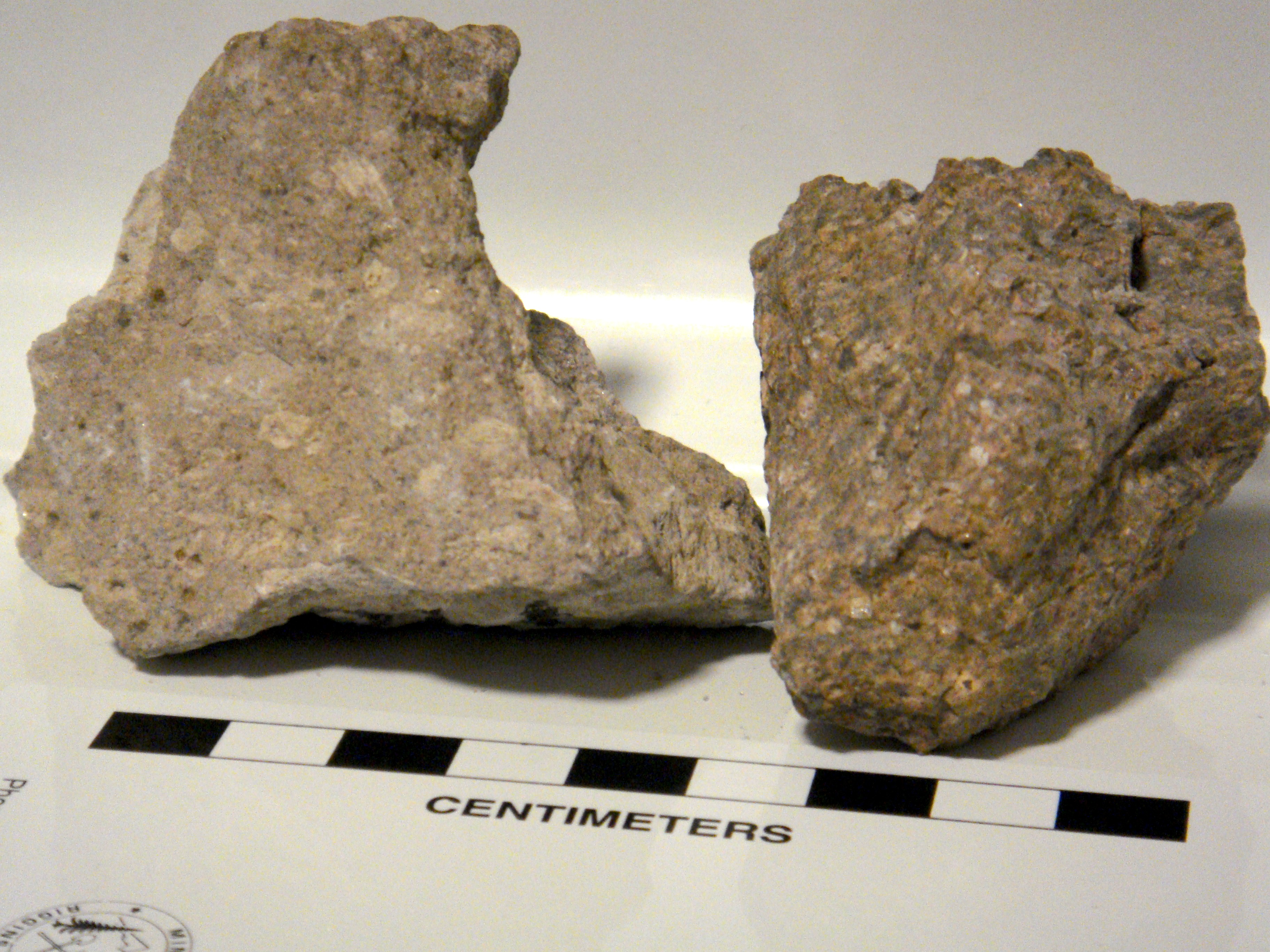
Pyroclastic rocks from the Bishop tuff; uncompressed with pumice (on left), compressed with fiamme (on right)

The word pyroclast is derived from the Greek πῦρ (pýr), meaning 'fire', and κλαστός (klastós), meaning 'broken in pieces'. A name for pyroclastic flows that glow red in the dark is nuée ardente (French for 'burning cloud'); this was notably used to describe the disastrous 1902 eruption of Mount Pelée on Martinique, a French island in the Caribbean.

== Formation and movement of pyroclastic currents ==
Pyroclastic flows originate from the physical processes that occur prior to and during a volcanic eruption. Magma within the volcano degasses, promoting decompression, greater buoyancy, and rising motion of magma to the surface, which in turn allows for greater degassing. As more degassing occurs, the magma evolves from a gas-containing liquid to a mixture of condensed particles and gas with greater upward velocity. Upon eruption of this mixture to the surface and atmosphere, much of it sinks to the ground due to being denser than the atmosphere, forming the pyroclastic density current that then moves along the ground.

Upon entering the atmosphere, as a gravity current, pyroclastic currents are subject to gravitational pull toward the surface. Gravity is counterbalanced by the fluid forces associated with the turbulent processes within the current. This turbulence is courtesy of pyroclastic currents being a heterogeneous mixture. Made up of condensed volcanic matter and hot gas, pyroclastic flows are heterogeneous in their chemical composition. As a result, within a current, particle temperature, resistance to change in motion (inertia), velocity, and other properties vary. As a fluid, pyroclastic currents experience internal friction (viscosity). However, temperature, velocity, and inertial imbalances within the current overpower this viscosity, promoting the turbulent fluid flow that counteracts gravity. Reynold’s number measures the degree to which these property imbalances overpower viscosity. The higher Reynold’s number, the higher chances for turbulence within a fluid.

A key signature of turbulence are swirls known as eddies. Pyroclastic currents are multiphase, meaning their physical processes, including the formation of these eddies, occur at a wide variety of scales, from the molecular to the scale of the bulk matter of the pyroclastic current itself. As these eddies form through turbulence, they create paths of fluid flow. Meanwhile, gravity continues to push the bulk mixture downward. Within the heterogeneous mixture of the pyroclastic flow, heavier, more condensed material (e.g., rocks) will be more strongly impacted by gravity, sinking to the ground and flowing along it. By contrast, lighter, less dense material (e.g., ash), will be more strongly impacted by the fluid flow generated from turbulence, causing it to rise. The former component of pyroclastic currents is sometimes referred to as basal flow, whereas the latter is sometimes known as an ash plume.

Furthermore, two ways of quantifying this separation of pyroclastic material is through Froude’s number and Stokes’ number. Froude’s number is a measure of whether gravity or turbulent fluid force will more strongly dictate a fluid’s motion. Lower values of Froude’s number indicate that gravity is dominant while higher ones indicate that turbulent fluid motion is more dominant. Meanwhile, Stokes’ number is a measure of whether a particle or parcel of matter within the fluid will follow the flow path of the fluid or remain independent of it. Higher values of Stokes’ number suggest a particle will flow along the fluid path, while lower values suggest it will remain independent from the fluid path. Denser rocks within a pyroclastic material have a tendency to sink under the influence of gravity, falling to and traveling along the ground and departing from the fluid flow paths generated from turbulence. In turn, these components of pyroclastic current have lower values for Froude’s and Stokes’ numbers. Lighter ashes and gases within a pyroclastic current are more strongly influenced by turbulent fluid motion, traveling along the fluid path. Hence, they have higher values for Froude’s and Stokes’ numbers.

== Terminology ==
To fully clarify terminology, the denser components of a pyroclastic current which sink and become part of the ground-hugging basal flow are part of what is known as a pyroclastic flow. Meanwhile, the more buoyant components of a pyroclastic current which become more significantly influenced by fluid forces are part of what is known as a pyroclastic surge. Pyroclastic flows merely lie within the continuum of what occurs to the volcanic matter contained within a pyroclastic current. In other words, the lighter a material within the pyroclastic flow, the more likely it will become part of a pyroclastic surge, while the heavier the material, the more likely it will become part of a pyroclastic flow.

Pyroclastic surges can also be referred to as "fully dilute pyroclastic density currents." Their lower density sometimes allows surges to flow over higher topographic features or water such as ridges, hills, rivers, and seas. Surges may also contain steam, water, and rock at less than 250 °C (480 °F); these are called "cold" compared with other flows, although the temperature is still lethally high. Cold pyroclastic surges can occur when the eruption is from a vent under a shallow lake or the sea. Fronts of some pyroclastic density currents are fully dilute; for example, during the eruption of Mount Pelée in 1902, a fully dilute current overwhelmed the city of Saint-Pierre and killed nearly 30,000 people.

== Examples ==
Eruptions throughout history reveal several specific mechanisms that can produce pyroclastic flow:

- Fountain collapse of an eruption column from a Plinian eruption (e.g. Mount Vesuvius' destruction of Herculaneum and Pompeii in 79 AD). In such an eruption, the material forcefully ejected from the vent heats the surrounding air and the turbulent mixture rises through convection for many kilometres. If the erupted jet is unable to heat the surrounding air sufficiently, convection currents will not be strong enough to carry the plume upwards and it falls, flowing down the flanks of the volcano.
- Fountain collapse of an eruption column associated with a Vulcanian eruption (e.g., Montserrat's Soufrière Hills volcano has generated many of these deadly pyroclastic flows and surges). The gas and projectiles create a cloud that is denser than the surrounding air and becomes a pyroclastic flow.
- Frothing at the mouth of the vent during degassing of the erupted lava. This can lead to the production of a rock called ignimbrite. This occurred during the eruption of Novarupta in 1912.
- Gravitational collapse of a lava dome or spine, with subsequent avalanches and flows down a steep slope (e.g., Montserrat's Soufrière Hills volcano, which caused nineteen deaths in 1997).
- The directional blast (or jet) when part of a volcano collapses or explodes (e.g., the eruption of Mount St. Helens on May 18, 1980). As distance from the volcano increases, this rapidly transforms into a gravity-driven current.

== Size, speed, temperature, and effects ==
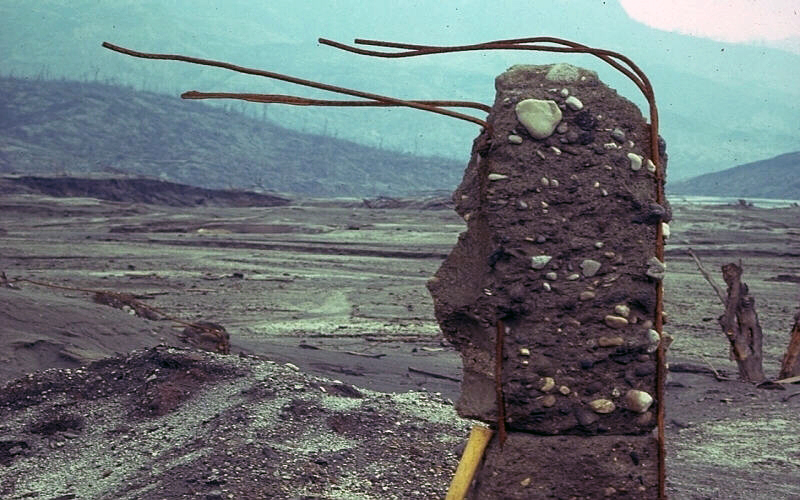
Building remnant in Francisco Leon destroyed by pyroclastic surges and flows during eruption of El Chichon volcano in Mexico in 1982. Reinforcement rods in the concrete were bent in the direction of the flow.

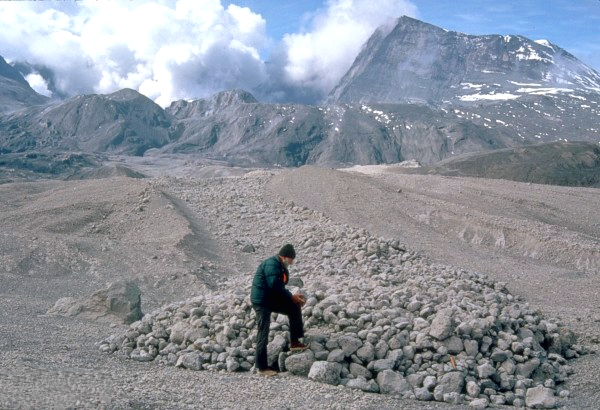
A scientist examines pumice blocks at the edge of a pyroclastic flow deposit from Mount St. Helens

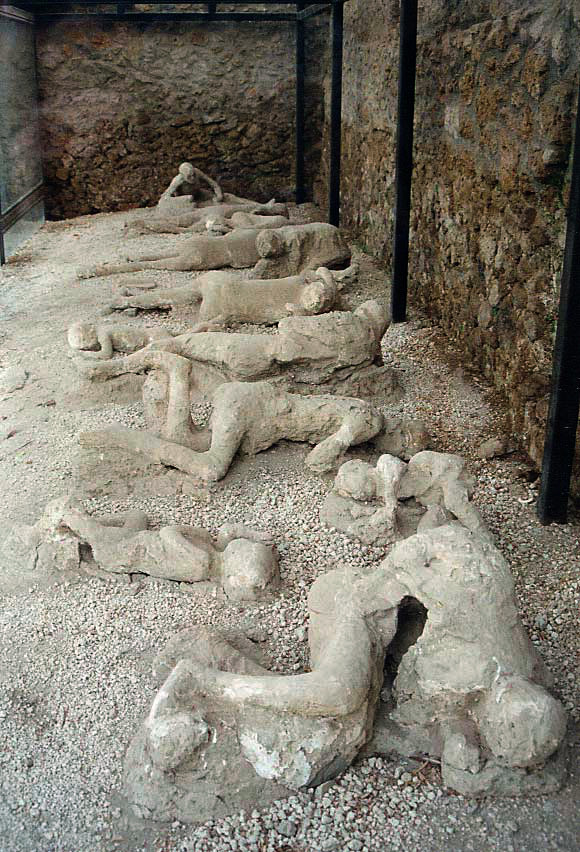
The casts of some victims in the so-called "Garden of the Fugitives", Pompeii

Flow volumes range from a few hundred cubic metres to more than 1,000 cubic kilometres (240 cu mi). Larger flows can travel for hundreds of kilometres, although none on that scale has occurred for several hundred thousand years. Most pyroclastic flows are around one to ten cubic kilometres (1/4–2 1/2 cu mi) and travel for several kilometres. Flows can deposit from less than 1 metre up to 200 metres in depth of loose rock fragment. Pyroclastic flows travel at average speeds of 100 km/h (30 m/s, 60 mph), although they can travel up to 700 km/h (190 m/s, 430 mph). Temperatures of the material within a pyroclastic density current range from 200 °C to 700 °C (390-1300 °F).

=== Effects of pyroclastic flows with historical examples ===
The kinetic energy of the moving cloud will flatten trees and buildings in its path. The hot gases and high speed make them particularly lethal, as they will quickly incinerate living organisms or turn them into carbonized fossils:

- The Ancient Roman cities of Pompeii and Herculaneum (now in Italy), for example, were engulfed by pyroclastic surges of Mount Vesuvius in AD 79 with many lives lost.
- The 1902 eruption of Mount Pelée destroyed the Martinique town of St. Pierre. Despite signs of impending eruption, the government deemed St. Pierre safe due to hills and valleys between it and the volcano, but the pyroclastic flow charred almost the entirety of the city, killing all but three of its 30,000 residents.
- A pyroclastic surge killed volcanologists Harry Glicken and Katia and Maurice Krafft and 40 other people on Mount Unzen, in Japan, on June 3, 1991. The surge started as a pyroclastic flow and the more energised surge climbed a spur on which the Kraffts and the others were standing; it engulfed them, and the corpses were covered with about 5 mm (1/4 in) of ash.
- On June 25, 1997, a pyroclastic flow travelled down Mosquito Ghaut on the Caribbean island of Montserrat. A large, highly energized pyroclastic surge developed. This flow could not be restrained by the Ghaut and spilled out of it, killing 19 people who were in the Streatham village area (which was officially evacuated). Several others in the area suffered severe burns.

== Interaction of pyroclastic currents with water ==
Testimonial evidence from the 1883 eruption of Krakatoa, supported by experimental evidence, shows that pyroclastic density currents can cross significant bodies of water. One flow reached the Sumatran coast as far as 48 kilometres (26 nautical miles) away.

Generally, pyroclastic currents can interact with water in many ways, with their properties dictating what exactly these interactions entail. With their heterogeneous assortment of chemical constituents, density varies greatly within pyroclastic currents. Components that are less dense than water are able to remain buoyant, whereas components denser than water will sink, isolating the pyroclastic current to its less dense components. Additionally, there may be currents whose density exceed that of water while still remaining buoyant. Such a phenomenon occurs by virtue of a bulk density lower than water brought about by dispersal of hot gas and solid ash within a pyroclastic current. The temperature difference between a water body and a pyroclastic current generates steam from the water body, propelling the current’s movement. Meanwhile, as denser components of pyroclastic currents sink into the water, the sediments decrease the clarity of the water, thereby increasing its turbidity. These sediments form turbidity currents, flowing down the slopes of the water body under the influence of gravity and differences in density. Warmer pyroclastic currents are associated with greater sinking motion.

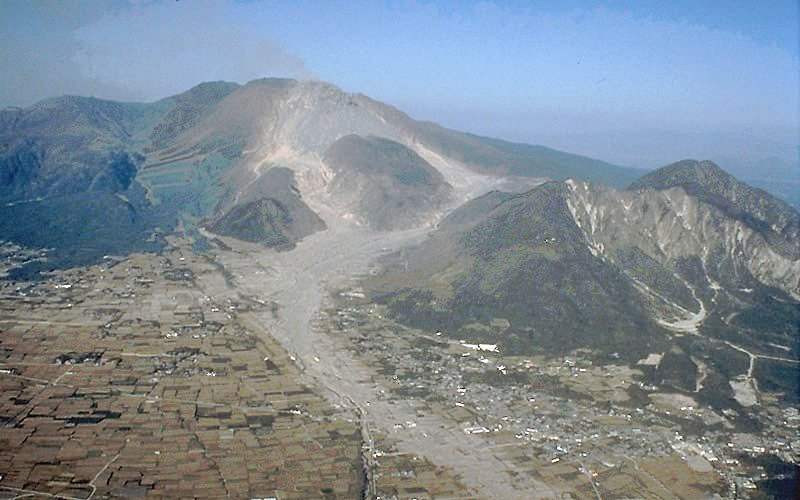
Pyroclastic and lahar deposits following the eruption of Mount Unzen in Japan, 1991.

If there is a sufficient flux in volume and mass into a water body, the shoreline can be displaced such that the water recedes and new land is formed. For example, during some phases of the Soufriere Hills volcano on Montserrat, pyroclastic flows were filmed about 1 km (1/2 nmi) offshore. These show the water boiling as the flow passes over it. The flows eventually built a delta, which covered about 1 km^{2} (250 acres). Another example was observed in 2019 at Stromboli when a pyroclastic flow traveled for several hundreds of metres above the sea.

The angle at which a pyroclastic current enters a water body also influences the trajectory of its constituents. If the angle of entry is more parallel to the water body surface, the current is able to more seamlessly flow along the surface of the water more easily. By contrast, if the angle of entry is more perpendicular to the water body surface, the current will more deeply penetrate the water, forming mixing layers within it, before reemerging to the surface and flowing across it. Additionally, a pyroclastic flow can interact with a body of water to form a large amount of mud, which can then continue to flow downhill as a lahar. This is one of several mechanisms that can create a lahar.

== Pyroclastic currents on other astronomical bodies ==
In 1963, NASA astronomer Winifred Cameron proposed that the lunar equivalent of terrestrial pyroclastic flows may have formed sinuous rilles on the Moon. In a lunar volcanic eruption, a pyroclastic cloud would follow local relief, resulting in an often sinuous track. The Moon's Schröter's Valley offers one example. Some volcanoes on Mars, such as Tyrrhenus Mons and Hadriacus Mons, have produced layered deposits that appear to be more easily eroded than lava flows, suggesting that they were emplaced by pyroclastic flows.

== See also ==
- Pyroclastic fall
- Pyroclastic rock
- Welded tuff
