= 1575 Winifred =

Asteroid

Discovery
- Discovered by: Indiana University (Indiana Asteroid Program)
- Discovery site: Goethe Link Obs.
- Discovery date: 20 April 1950

Designations
- Named after: Winifred Sawtell (staff member at USNO)
- Alternative designations: 1950 HH · 1928 HG; 1939 GK · 1950 HD_{1} 1977 UH_{1}
- Minor planet category: main-belt · Phocaea

Orbital characteristics
- Epoch 4 September 2017 (JD 2458000.5)
- Uncertainty parameter 0
- Observation arc: 88.51 yr (32,327 days)
- Aphelion: 2.7990 AU
- Perihelion: 1.9497 AU
- Semi-major axis: 2.3743 AU
- Eccentricity: 0.1789
- Orbital period (sidereal): 3.66 yr (1,336 days)
- Mean anomaly: 158.55°
- Mean motion: 0° 16^{m} 9.84^{s} / day
- Inclination: 24.827°
- Longitude of ascending node: 206.84°
- Argument of perihelion: 348.40°

Physical characteristics
- Dimensions: 9.31±1.0 km (IRAS); 9.441±0.131 km 9.45 km (derived); 9.488±0.254; 10.66±0.43 km
- Synodic rotation period: 125±2 h 129 h
- Geometric albedo: 0.236±0.033; 0.2388±0.0311; 0.2452±0.064; 0.247±0.034; 0.3134 (derived)
- Spectral type: S
- Absolute magnitude (H): 11.36±1.19 · 12.0 · 12.3

1575 Winifred, provisional designation 1950 HH, is a stony Phocaea asteroid and slow rotator from the inner regions of the asteroid belt, approximately 9.5 kilometers in diameter.

It was discovered on 20 April 1950, by astronomer Robert Curry Cameron of Indiana University during the Indiana Asteroid Program at Goethe Link Observatory in Indiana, United States. It was named after Winifred Cameron, an astronomer at the United States Naval Observatory.

== Orbit and classification ==
The stony S-type asteroid is a member of the Phocaea family (701), a group of asteroids with similar orbital characteristics, named after the family's namesake 25 Phocaea. It orbits the Sun at a distance of 1.9–2.8 AU once every 3 years and 8 months (1,336 days). Its orbit has an eccentricity of 0.18 and an inclination of 25° with respect to the ecliptic.

Winifred was first identified as 1928 HG at Johannesburg Observatory in 1928, extending the body's observation arc by 22 years prior to its official discovery observation.

== Physical characteristics ==
=== Rotational lightcurve ===
In July 2009, a rotational lightcurve was obtained for this asteroid from photometric observations taken by American astronomer Brian D. Warner at his Palmer Divide Observatory in Colorado. It gave a well-defined rotation period of 125±2 hours with an exceptionally high brightness amplitude of 1.20 in magnitude (U=3), and no sign of a non-principal axis rotation (NPAR). The result supersedes a previous observation by French astronomer Laurent Bernasconi from May 2005, that gave a similar, yet less accurate period of 129 hours, and with a smaller amplitude of 0.51 in magnitude (U=1).

=== Diameter and albedo ===
According to the surveys carried out by the Infrared Astronomical Satellite, IRAS, and NASA's Wide-field Infrared Survey Explorer with its subsequent NEOWISE mission, Winifred has an albedo of 0.24 to 0.25 and a diameter between 9.3 and 10.7 kilometers, while the Collaborative Asteroid Lightcurve Link derives a higher albedo of 0.31 and a diameter of 9.5 kilometers with an absolute magnitude of 12.0.

== Naming ==
This minor planet was named for a staff member of the United States Naval Observatory in Washington D.C., Winifred Sawtell Cameron. The official naming citation was proposed by the discovering astronomer and published by the Minor Planet Center in December 1952 (M.P.C. 844).
