= Smithson (crater) =

Crater on the Moon

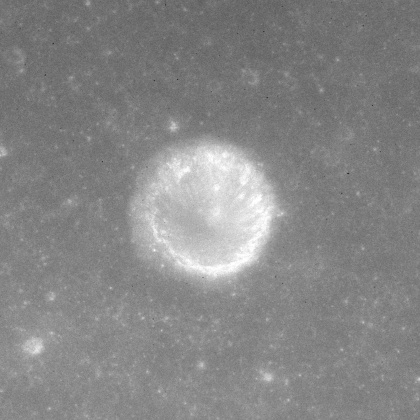
- Apollo 15 mapping camera image
- Coordinates: 2.4°N 53.6°E
- Diameter: 5 km
- Depth: Unknown
- Colongitude: 308° at sunrise
- Eponym: James Smithson

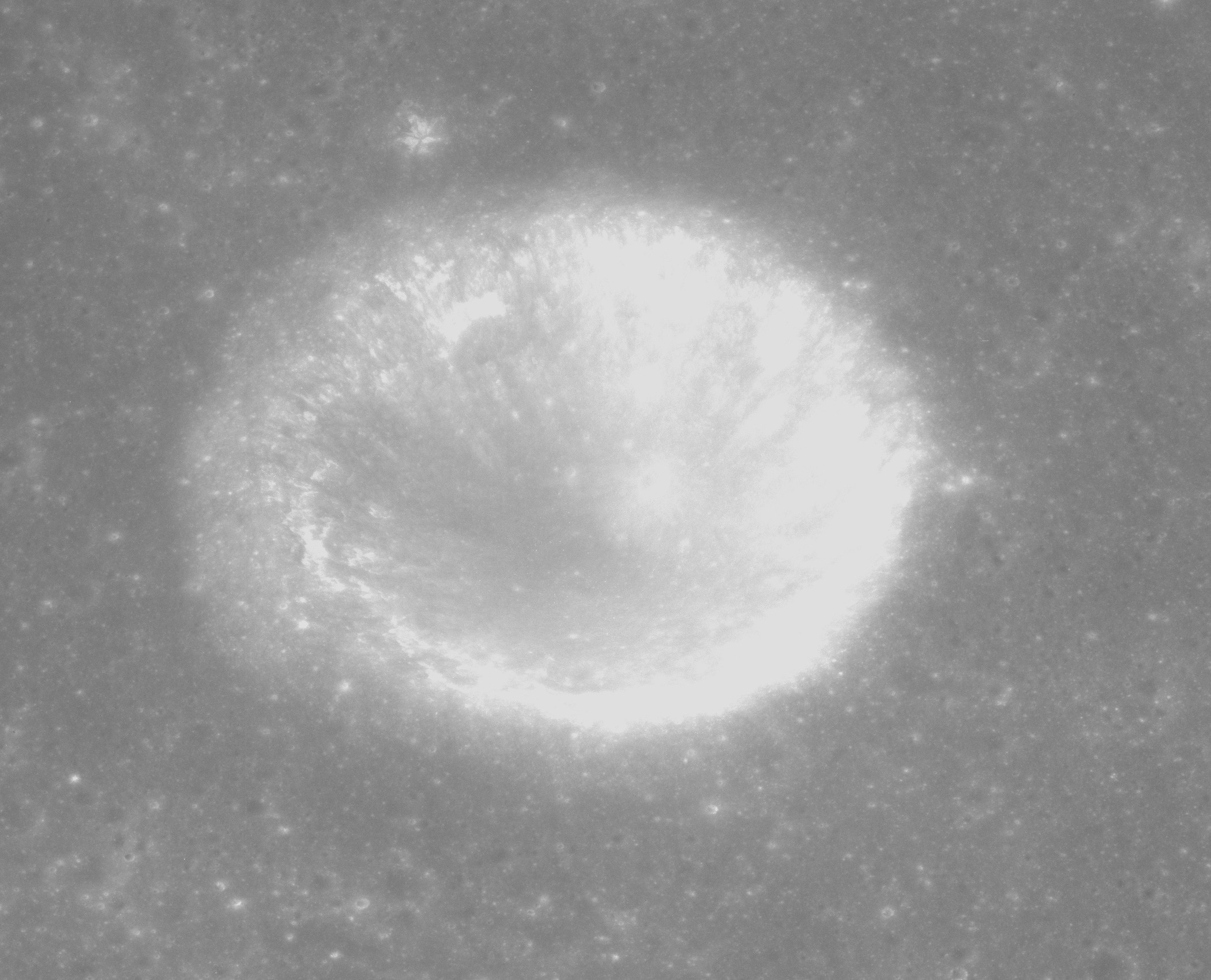
Apollo 15 panoramic camera image

Smithson is a small lunar impact crater located in the northeast part of Mare Fecunditatis. It is a circular, cup-shaped feature with a slightly higher albedo than the surrounding, dark lunar mare. It was previously identified as Taruntius N before being renamed by the IAU. Taruntius itself lies to the west-northwest, in the northwestern part of the same mare.
