= 1798 Watts =

Main-belt asteroid binary

Discovery
- Discovered by: Indiana University (Indiana Asteroid Program)
- Discovery site: Goethe Link Obs.
- Discovery date: 4 April 1949

Designations
- Named after: Chester Watts (American astronomer)
- Alternative designations: 1949 GC · 1934 VS; 1937 RL · 1970 YB; 1973 UD_{6}
- Minor planet category: main-belt · Flora

Orbital characteristics
- Epoch 4 September 2017 (JD 2458000.5)
- Uncertainty parameter 0
- Observation arc: 82.46 yr (30,117 days)
- Aphelion: 2.4676 AU
- Perihelion: 1.9315 AU
- Semi-major axis: 2.1996 AU
- Eccentricity: 0.1219
- Orbital period (sidereal): 3.26 yr (1,192 days)
- Mean anomaly: 136.39°
- Mean motion: 0° 18^{m} 7.56^{s} / day
- Inclination: 6.1941°
- Longitude of ascending node: 44.269°
- Argument of perihelion: 4.0161°
- Known satellites: 1 (Note: D. Pray (2017), photometry for (1798) Watts at Collaborative Asteroid Lightcurve Link (CALL). Currently 2017CBET.4374....1P is missing on the SAO/NASA Astrophysics Data System (ADS))

Physical characteristics
- Dimensions: 6.45±0.28 km 6.631±0.186 km 6.986±0.060 km 7.14 km (calculated)
- Synodic rotation period: 3.5060±0.0004
- Geometric albedo: 0.24 (assumed); 0.2765±0.0258; 0.294±0.053
- Spectral type: SMASS = S · LS · S
- Absolute magnitude (H): 12.8 · 12.9 · 13.05±0.17

1798 Watts, provisional designation 1949 GC, is a stony asteroid and binary system from the inner regions of the asteroid belt, approximately 7 kilometers in diameter.

It was discovered on 4 April 1949, by IU's Indiana Asteroid Program at Goethe Link Observatory near Brooklyn, Indiana, United States. The asteroid was named for American astronomer Chester Burleigh Watts. Its small minor-planet moon has a period of 26.96 hours.

== Orbit and classification ==
Watts is a member of the Flora family, a large group of stony S-type asteroids in the inner main-belt. It orbits the Sun at a distance of 1.9–2.5 AU once every 3 years and 3 months (1,192 days). Its orbit has an eccentricity of 0.12 and an inclination of 6° with respect to the ecliptic. Watts was first observed and identified as 1934 VS at Yerkes Observatory in 1934, extending the body's observation arc by 15 years prior to its official discovery observation.

== Physical characteristics ==
=== Spectral type ===
In the SMASS classification, Watts is characterized as a common stony S-type asteroid. It is also classified as a LS-type by PanSTARRS's photometric survey.

=== Diameter and albedo ===
According to the survey carried out by NASA's Wide-field Infrared Survey Explorer with its subsequent NEOWISE mission, Watts measures 6.63 kilometers in diameter and its surface has an albedo between 0.276 and 0.294. The Collaborative Asteroid Lightcurve Link assumes an albedo of 0.24 – derived from 8 Flora, the largest member and namesake of this asteroid family – and calculates a diameter of 7.14 kilometers with an absolute magnitude of 12.9.

=== Moon and lightcurve ===
In February 2017, a rotational lightcurve of Watts was obtained from photometric observations by . Lightcurve analysis gave a rotation period of 3.5060 hours with a low brightness amplitude of 0.06 magnitude, indicating that the body has a spheroidal shape (U=n.a.).

During the photometric observations, a minor-planet moon was discovered, making Watts a binary asteroid. The satellite of the synchronous binary has an orbital period of 26.96 hours.

== Naming ==
This minor planet was named in honour of American astronomer Chester Burleigh Watts (1889–1971), a graduate of Indiana University. He worked at the United States Naval Observatory for 44 years, making distinguished contributions in the field of positional astronomy and pioneered in the field of automation of transit circle observations, which led to results of the highest systematic accuracy. From the late 1940 until 1963 he meticulously mapped every feature on the marginal zone of the Moon. The official naming citation was published by the Minor Planet Center on 15 June 1973 (M.P.C. 3508).
