= Garden of the Fugitives =

Archeological site in Pompeii

Coordinates: 40.7496°N 14.4926°E

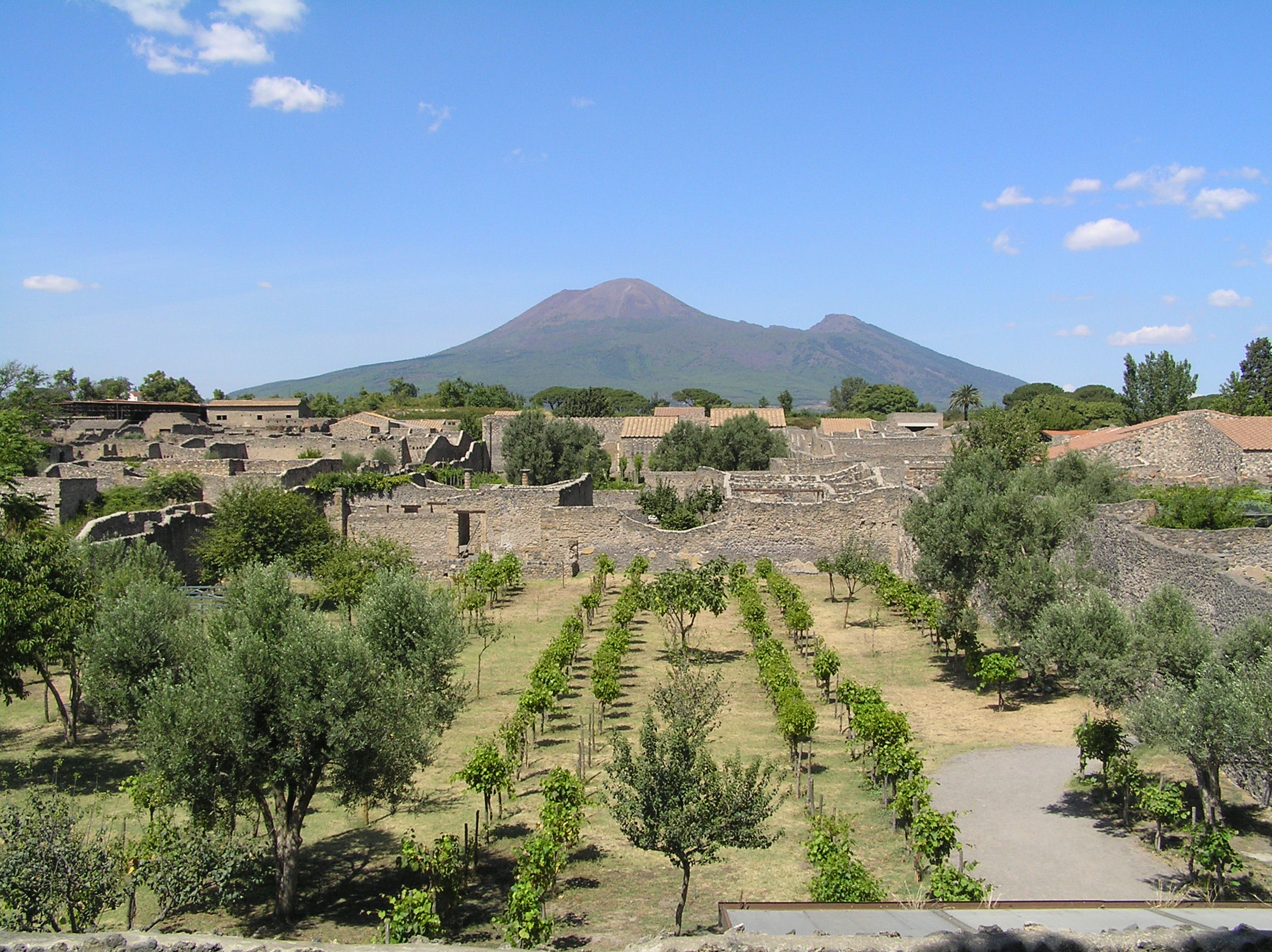
View of Vesuvius from the Garden of the Fugitives

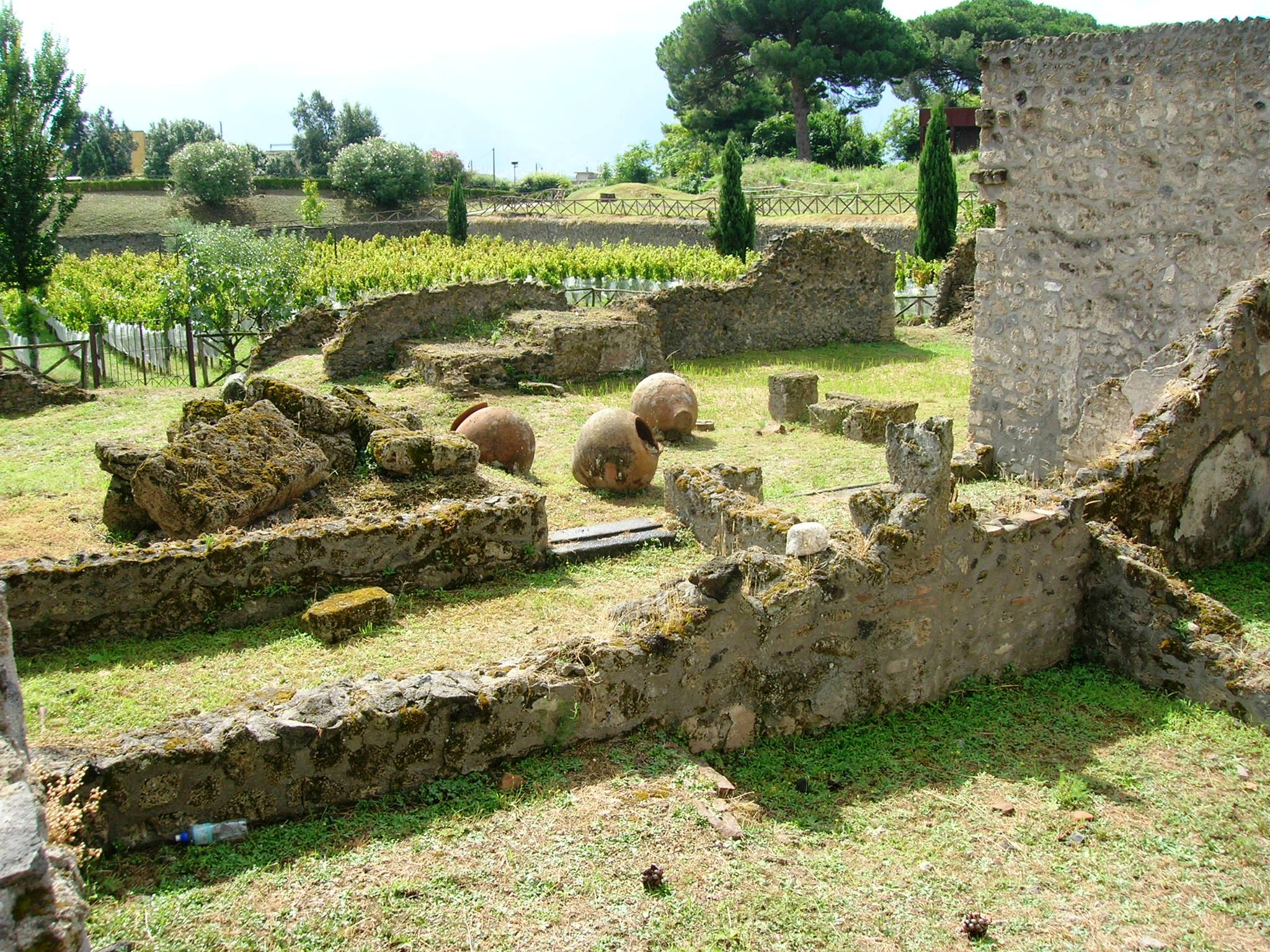
Garden of the Fugitives

The Garden of the Fugitives (Italian: Orto dei Fuggiaschi) is an archaeological site located in the ancient destroyed city of Pompeii, in Regio 1 Insula 21. It contains the casts of 13 victims of the eruption of Mount Vesuvius in 79 AD.

The insula once contained more town houses than the two which stand at the northwestern end of the insula but the rest of the area had been largely converted into a vegetable garden and vineyard before the eruption, with a triclinium covered by a pergola for outdoor banquets.

The garden is situated near the Large Palaestra and just inside the Nocera gate. Today it has been extensively and carefully replanted to represent the original contents.

The victims were adults and children, several found close together and others scattered over the area. They died apparently while trying to find a way out of the Nocera Gate, as they were above the layer of pumice that had already reached a height of 3.5 metres (12 feet), and were caught by the pyroclastic flow which was fatal.

== History ==
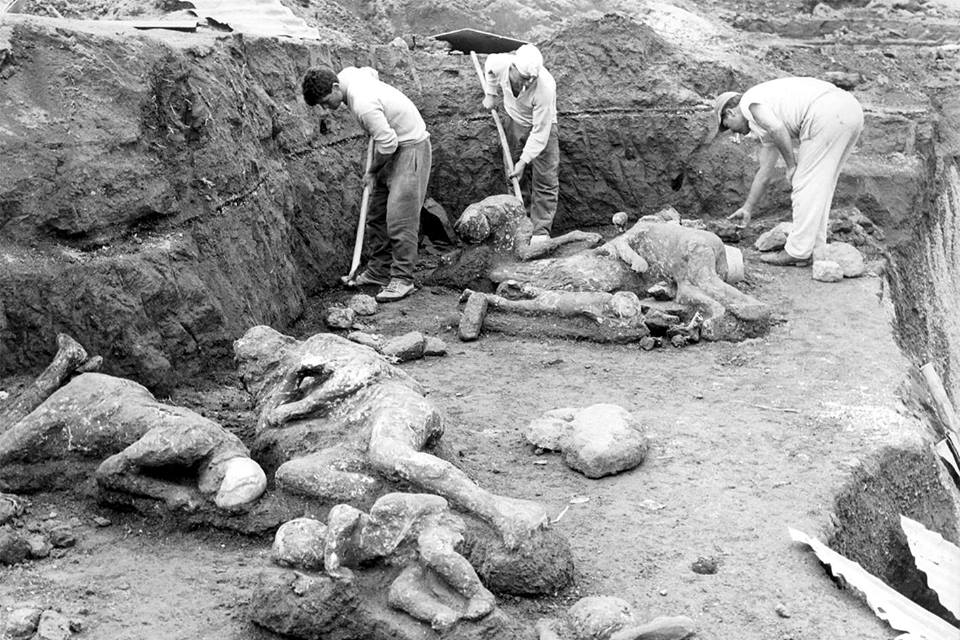
Original excavations

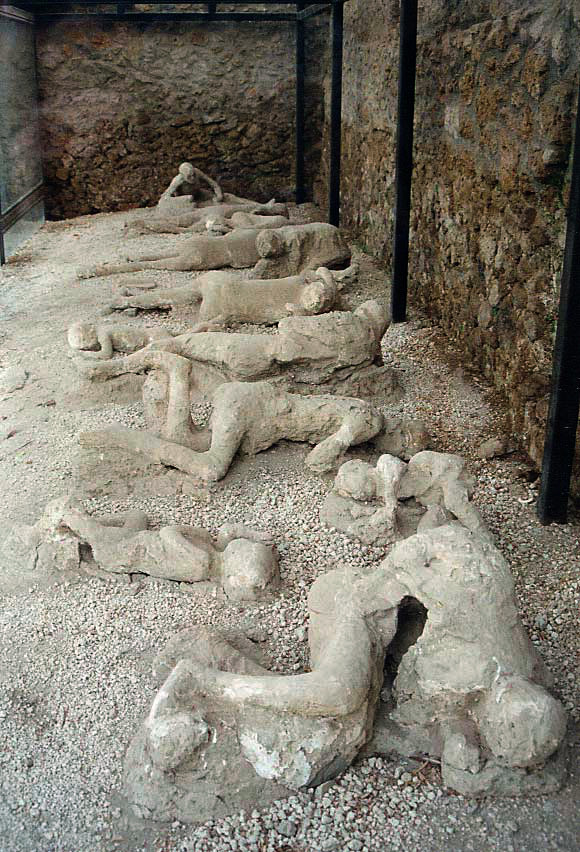
Casts of bodies in Garden of the Fugitives

=== Discovery ===
The Fugitives were uncovered by Amedeo Maiuri, the superintendent of Pompeii. They were uncovered in 1961 as hollow cavities where the flesh had rotted away. When filled with plaster of paris, the bodies of the victims were revealed. They were originally found in three smaller groups. They are now displayed in one long line.

Maiuri published stories for each of the bodies in the November 1961 edition of National Geographic ("Last Moments of the Pompeians"). These stories are now considered largely fictitious.

== Victims ==
=== Merchant ===
Belonging to a group of people Maiuri called a merchant family, this victim rises up on his hands. He has a metal nail holding his head and arm to his body.

Due to the compression of the bones in the merchant's wrist, it has been determined that the merchant, in life, had a severe case of osteoarthritis. There are breaks in the upper arm bone that occurred around or after the time of death. It is possible these were caused by a fall onto the arm.

=== Mother ===
Described by Maiuri "her body already weakened through childbirth". She lies with the youngest child, near two other young children Maiuri said had been holding hands and fallen together. The two boys were between five and two based on forensic dentistry examination.

=== Second farming family ===
Described as a young couple and their daughter, formally dubbed "The Farmer's Daughter". From the state of her teeth, she was about 12–14 months at the time of death. This makes her the youngest victim recovered in Pompeii.

=== Servant ===
Maiuri described a servant carrying a bag over his shoulder and leading the last family to safety; however, x-rays revealed that the presumed bag is actually just a mis-formation of the plaster. The servant was aged to be about in his mid-teens based on bone data.
