= Taruntius (crater) =

Crater on the Moon

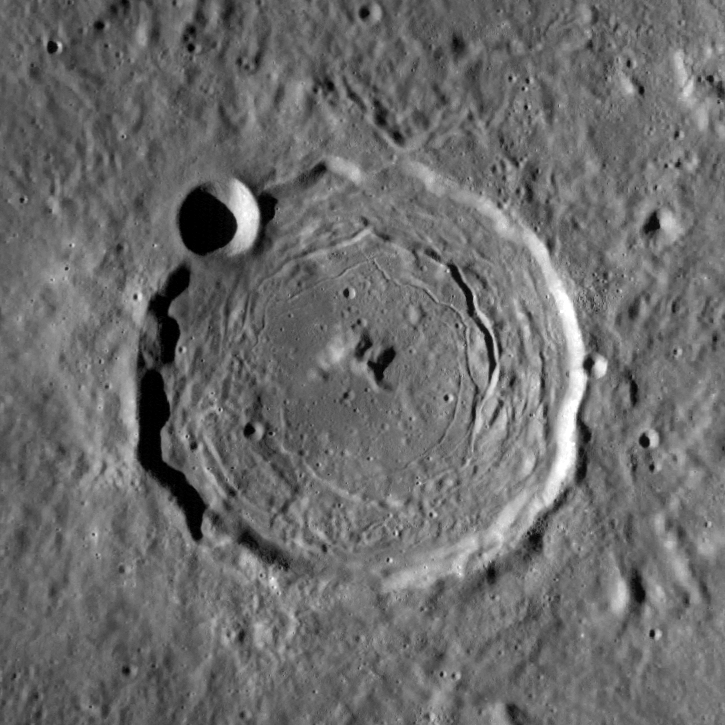
- LRO image
- Coordinates: 5.6°N 46.5°E
- Diameter: 56 km
- Depth: 1.10 km
- Colongitude: 314° at sunrise
- Formation: Copernican
- Eponym: Lucius Tarutius Firmanus

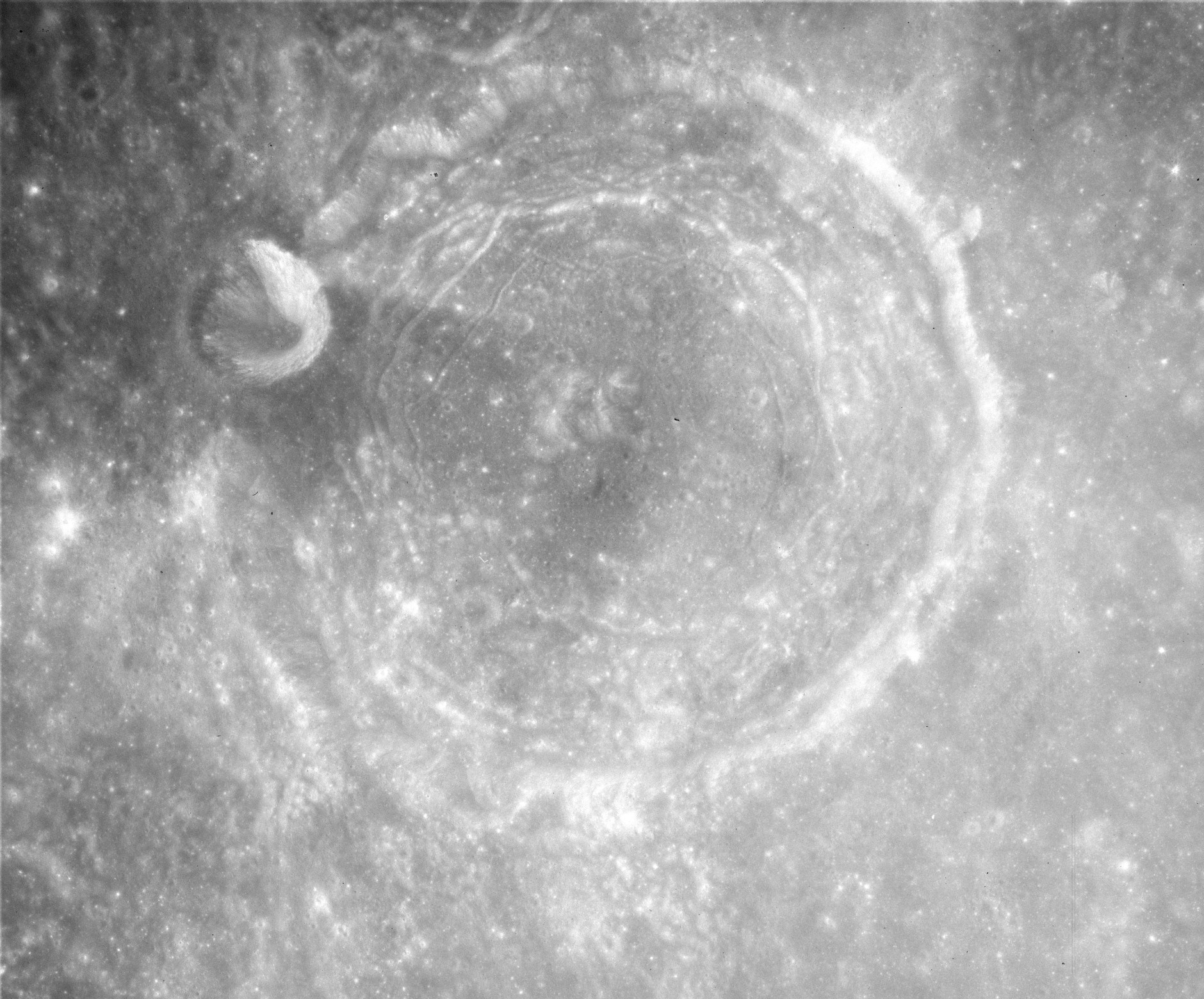
Apollo 15 mapping camera image

Taruntius is a lunar impact crater on the northwestern edge of Mare Fecunditatis. It was named after ancient Roman philosopher, mathematician and astrologer Lucius Tarutius Firmanus. To the northwest is the lava-flooded crater Lawrence, and to the north lie the craters Watts and da Vinci.

== Description ==
The surface about Taruntius has an unusual number of ghost craters and lava-flooded features, especially to the southwest in the Mare Fecunditatis.

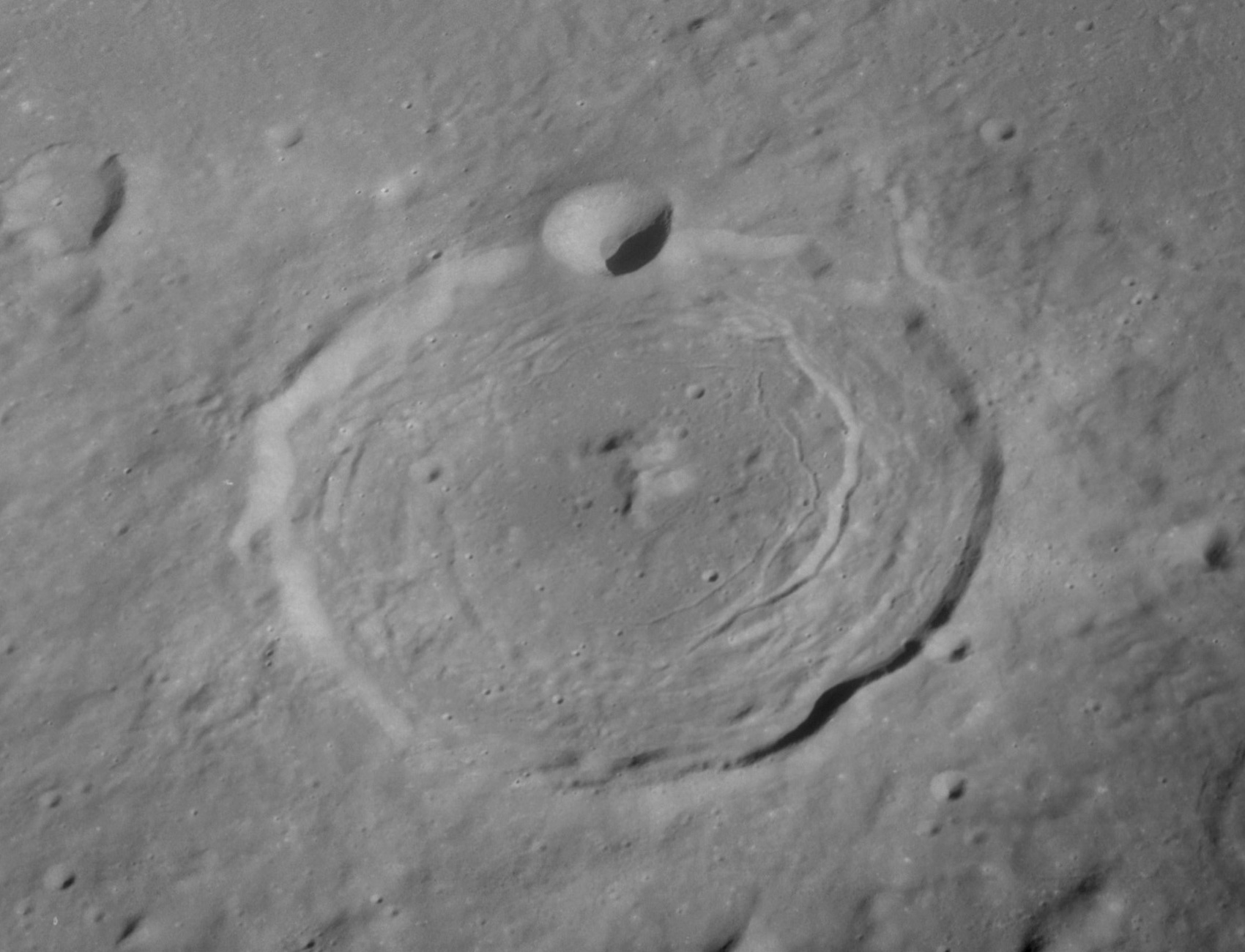
Oblique view of Taruntius from Apollo 11, facing northwest

The outer rim of Taruntius is shallow, but forms a veined, complex rampart in the nearby mare, especially to the north and southwest. The rim is broken in the northwest by the small crater Cameron. The inner rim face lacks terraces, but in the interior is an unusual concentric inner rim that is heavily worn and irregular. This is a floor-fractured crater, possibly created by an uplift of mare material from beneath the interior. There is a low central peak complex in the middle of the relatively flat interior floor. There are also some slender rilles that are concentric to the rim.

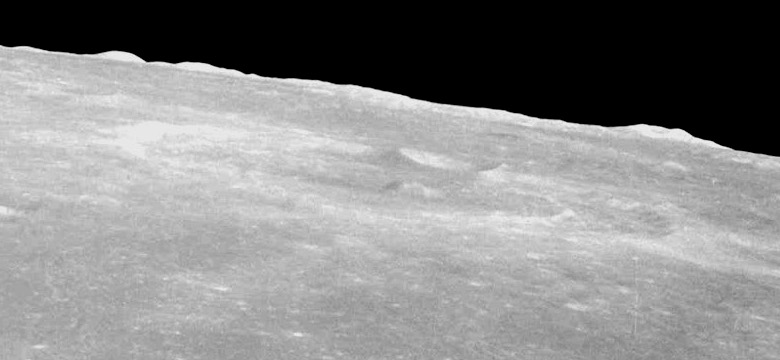
Highly oblique view from Apollo 8, facing west

The crater has a pair of faint dark patches. One patch is located just south of the central peak and the other falls on the sides of the northern rim near Cameron. These were likely created by deposits of volcanic ash from small vents. Taruntius has a ray system with a radius of over 300 kilometers. Due to these rays, Taruntius has been mapped as part of the Copernican System, but this dating has been disputed.

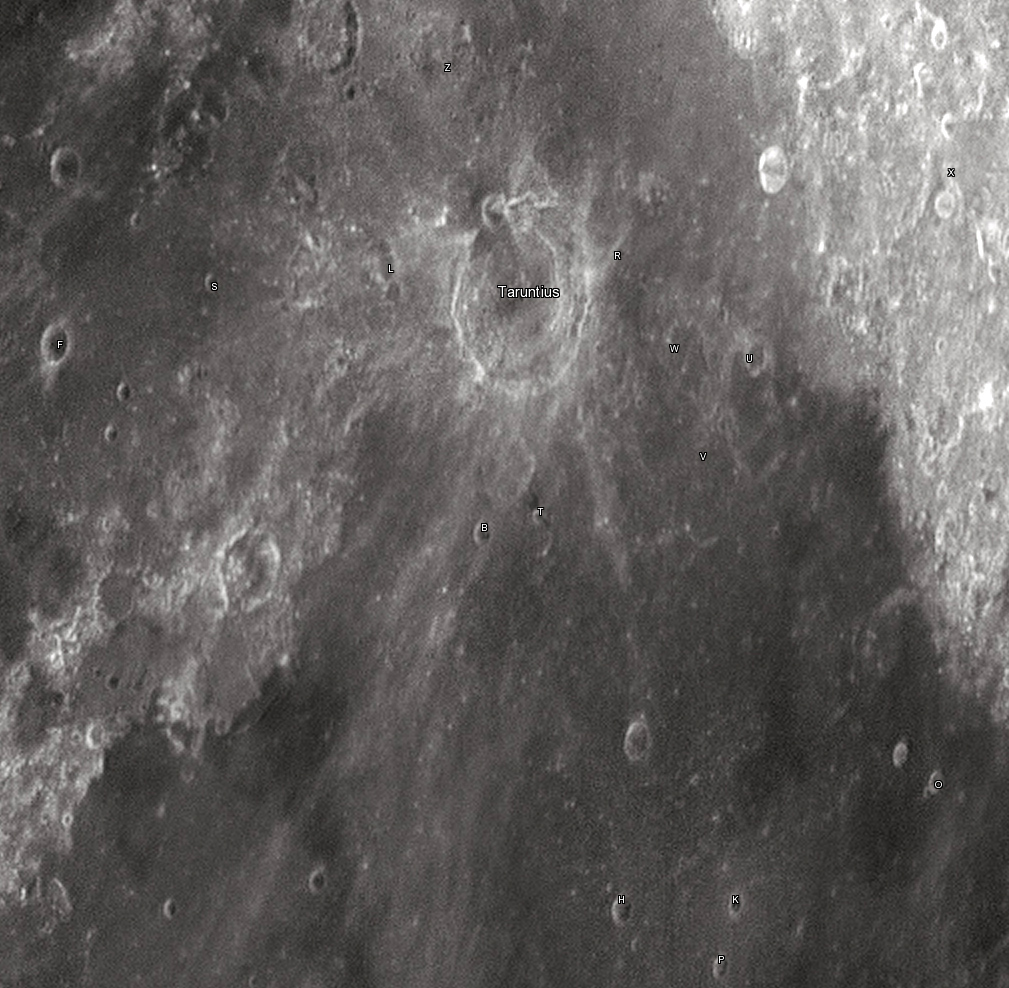
Taruntius crater and its satellite craters taken from Earth in 2012 at the University of Hertfordshire's Bayfordbury Observatory with the telescopes Meade LX200 14" and Lumenera Skynyx 2-1

== Satellite craters ==
By convention these features are identified on lunar maps by placing the letter on the side of the crater midpoint that is closest to Taruntius.

Taruntius	Latitude	Longitude	Diameter
B	3.3° N	46.6° E	7 km
F	4.0° N	40.5° E	11 km
H	0.3° N	49.9° E	8 km
K	0.6° N	51.6° E	5 km
L	5.5° N	44.4° E	14 km
O	2.2° N	54.3° E	7 km
P	0.1° N	51.6° E	7 km
R	6.1° N	47.9° E	5 km
S	4.9° N	42.4° E	5 km
T	3.4° N	47.5° E	10 km
U	5.6° N	50.1° E	12 km
V	4.5° N	49.8° E	21 km
W	5.5° N	48.9° E	15 km
X	7.7° N	53.0° E	23 km
Z	7.6° N	44.9° E	17 km

The following craters have been renamed by the IAU.

- Taruntius A — See Asada crater.
- Taruntius C — See Cameron crater.
- Taruntius D — See Watts crater.
- Taruntius E — See Zähringer crater.
- Taruntius G — See Anville crater.
- Taruntius M — See Lawrence crater.
- Taruntius N — See Smithson crater.
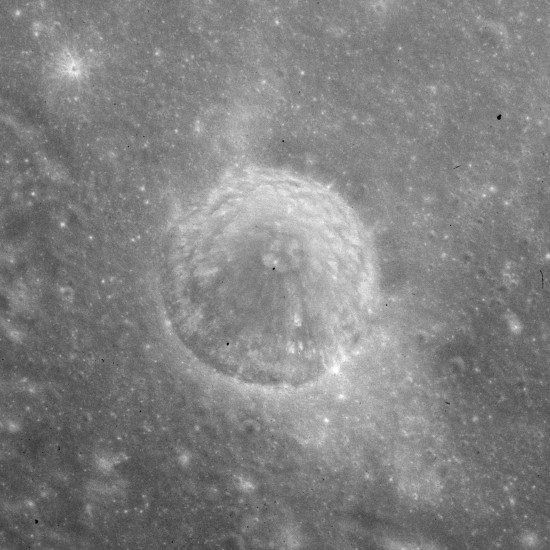
Taruntius F from Apollo 15

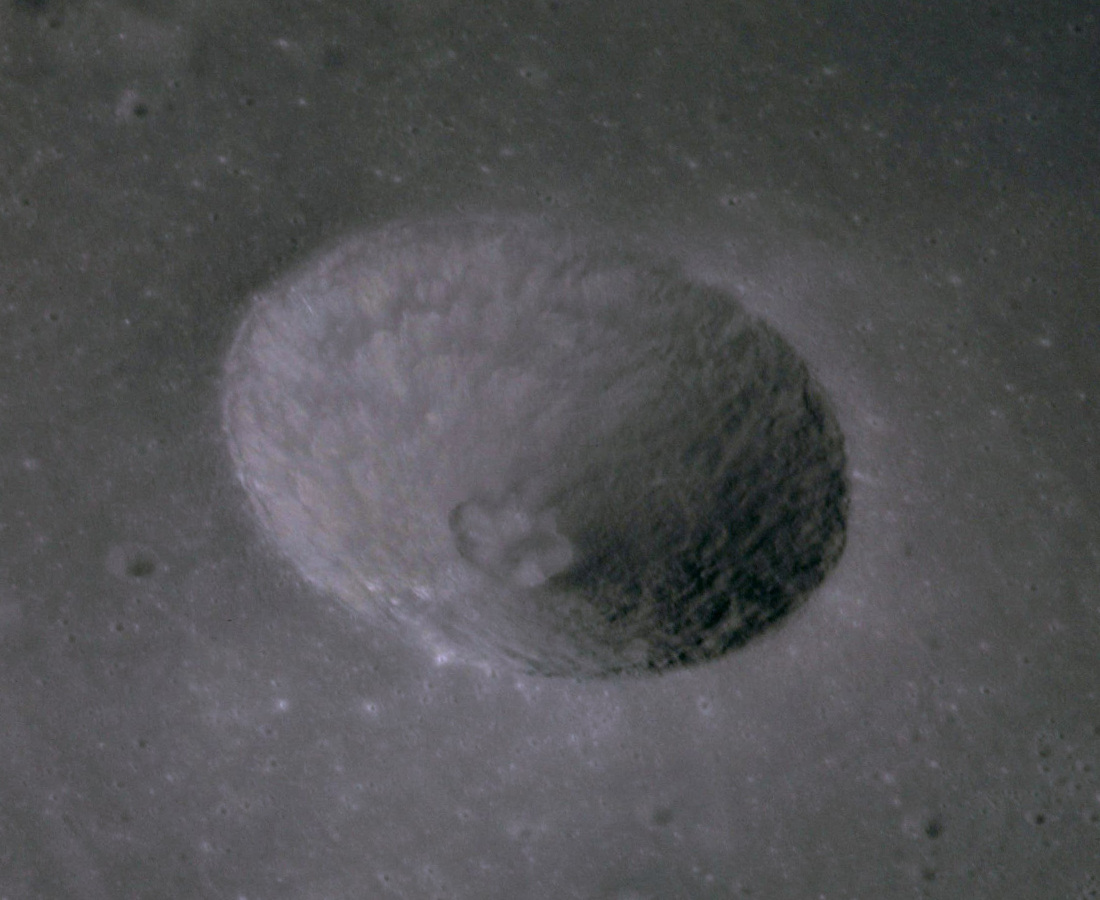
Taruntius F from Apollo 10

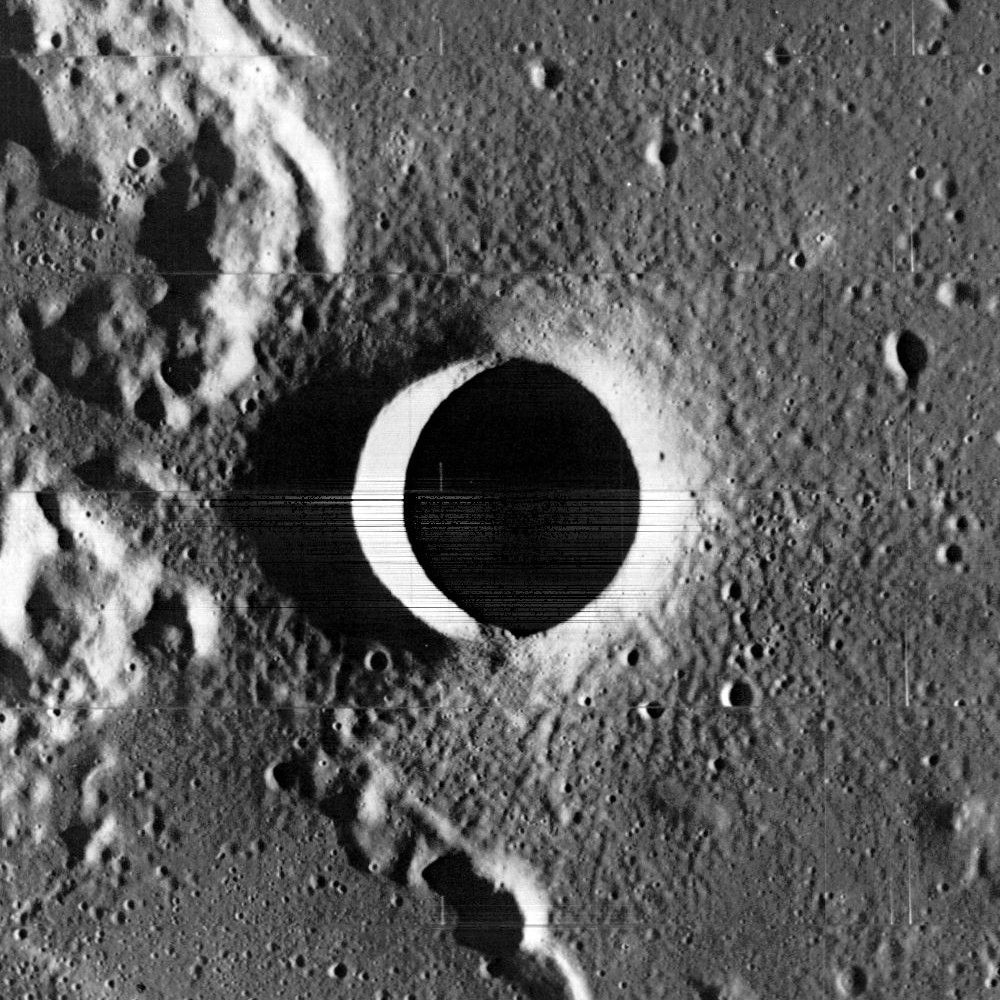
Taruntius F from Lunar Orbiter 1

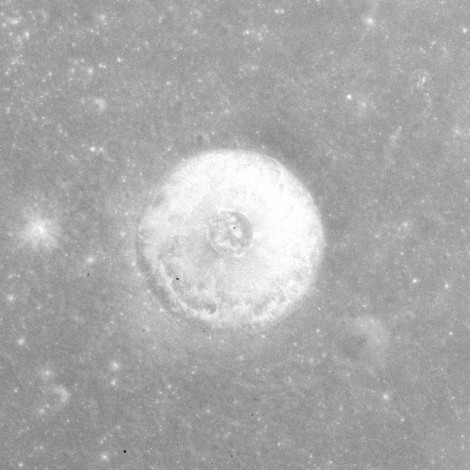
Taruntius H from Apollo 15

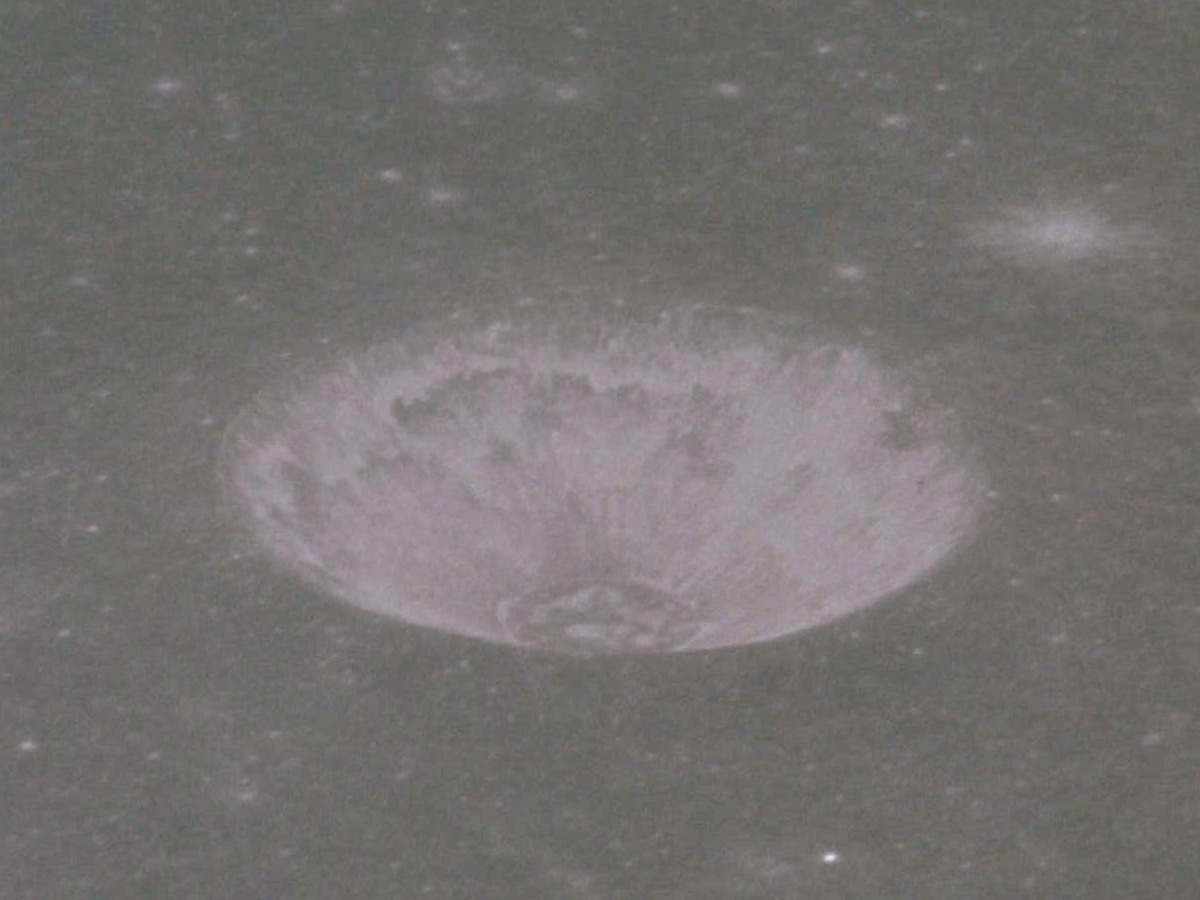
Taruntius H from Apollo 10

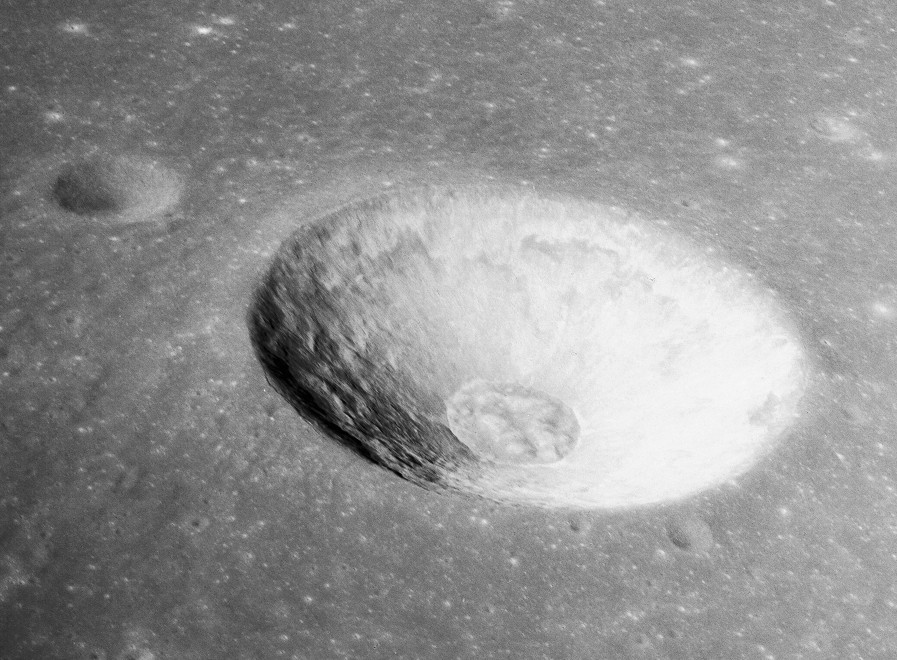
Taruntius H from Apollo 10

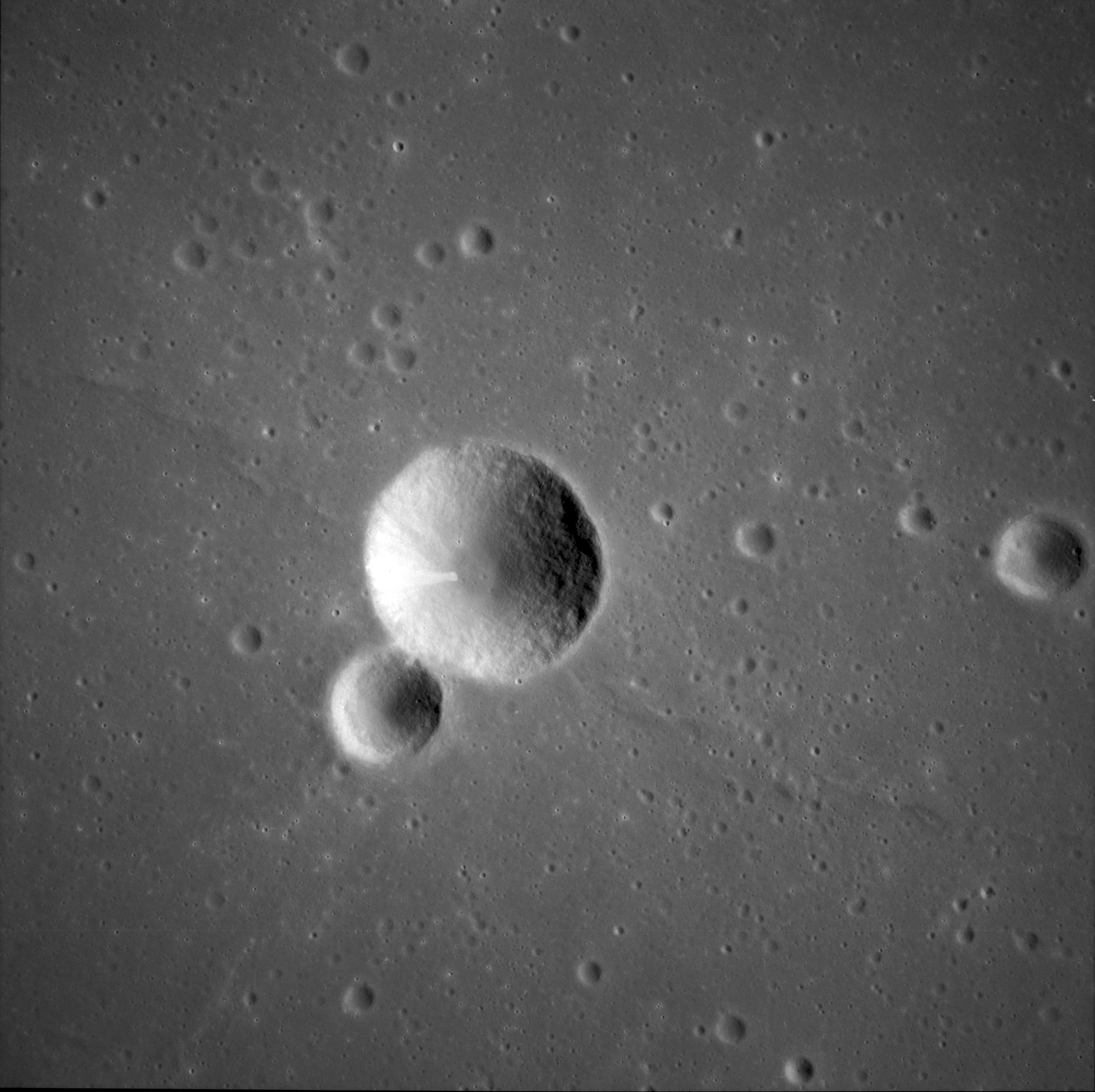
Taruntius O from Apollo 11

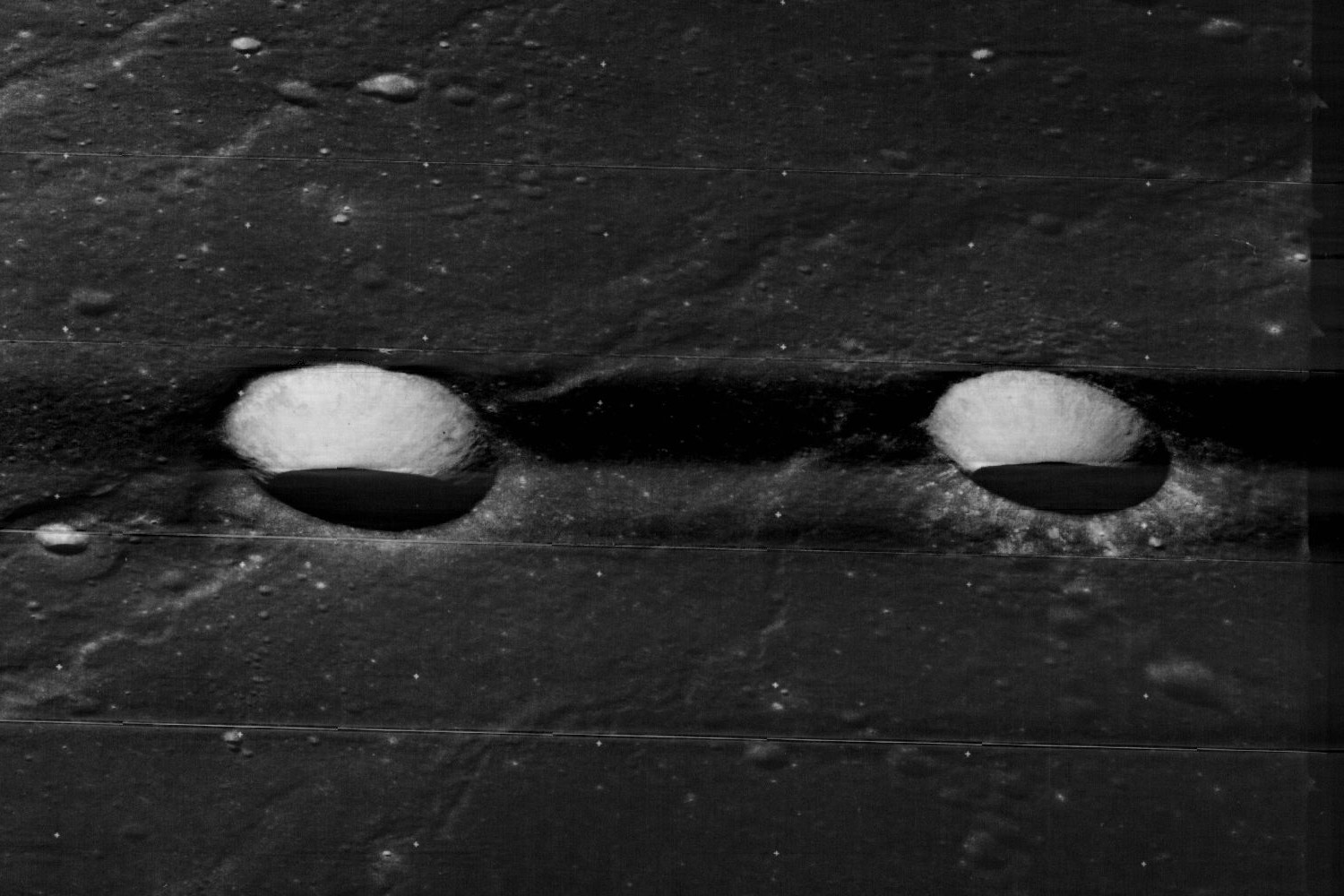
Taruntius K (right) and P (left) from Lunar Orbiter 5
