= Cameron (crater) =

Crater on the Moon

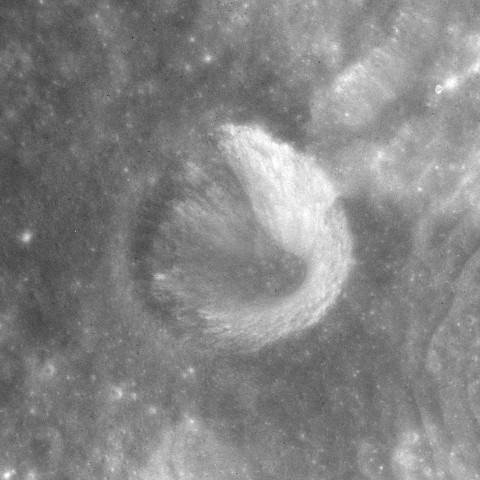
- Apollo 15 mapping camera image
- Coordinates: 6.2°N 45.9°E
- Diameter: 10.91 km (6.78 mi)
- Colongitude: 314° at sunrise
- Eponym: Robert C. Cameron

Cameron is a small lunar impact crater that lies across the northwest rim of the crater Taruntius. This formation is circular and cup-shaped, with no particular distinguishing features.

Previously designated Taruntius C, this crater was named after American astronomer Robert Curry Cameron (1925-1972), by his wife, lunar specialist Winifred Cameron. Its designation was officially adopted by the International Astronomical Union in 1973.
