= Chester Burleigh Watts =

American astronomer

Chester Burleigh Watts (October 27, 1889 – July 17, 1971) was an American astronomer.

He was born in Winchester, Indiana and he attended the Indiana University where he studied astronomy. In 1911 he joined the United States Naval Observatory, but returned to Indiana to complete his B.A. and graduated in 1914. Thereupon he rejoined the Naval Observatory, and began working in the 6" Transit Circle Division.

Except for a stint in the Time Service Division (1915-1919), he would remain with the transit circle department for the remainder of his career. In 1934 he became director of the 6" Transit Circle Division, and would lead the division for the next 25 years. His observations were published in the volumes of the Observatory publications.

During the 1940s he began the laborious task of mapping the marginal features of the Moon. (That is, the features that would produce a contour effect along the limb due to libration.) This study was based upon roughly 700 photographs of the lunar limb taken between 1927 up until 1956. The results were published in the Astronomical Papers of the American Ephemeris, volume 17.

He retired in 1959 but he continued to work for several years afterward. He was survived by his wife Ada and a son Chester B., along with (at least) three grandchildren.

He was awarded an honorary Doctor of Sciences degree from Indiana University in 1953. In 1955 he was awarded the James Craig Watson Medal by the National Academy of Sciences for his contributions to astronomy. The asteroid 1798 Watts is named after him, as is the crater Watts on the Moon.
