= Robert Curry Cameron =

American astronomer

Robert Curry Cameron (1925–1972) was an American astronomer.

Cameron was the son of M. W. Cameron, of Indianapolis, Indiana. He completed an undergraduate degree at Purdue University and a graduate degree in astronomy at Indiana University Bloomington.

On April 20, 1950, he discovered the minor planet (1575) Winifred at Brooklyn, Indiana. He named the body for Winifred Sawtell, who became his wife and colleague Winifred Cameron. He edited The Magnetic and Related Stars, a collection of papers presented at a 1965 symposium in Greenbelt, Maryland. The lunar crater Cameron was named after him, by his wife.
