= Watts (crater) =

Crater on the Moon

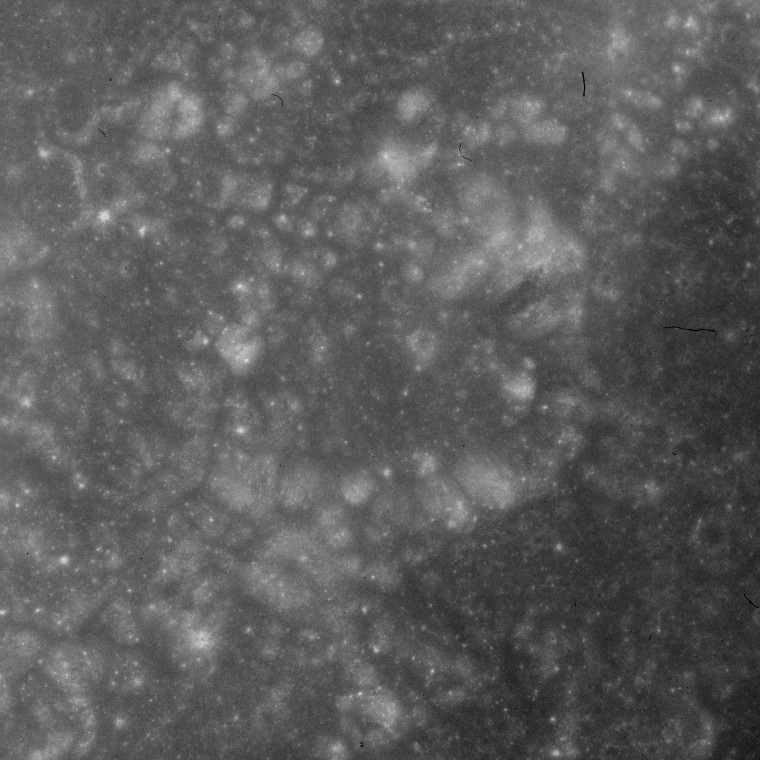
- Apollo 15 mapping camera image
- Coordinates: 8.9°N 46.3°E
- Diameter: 15 km
- Colongitude: 314° at sunrise
- Eponym: Chester B. Watts

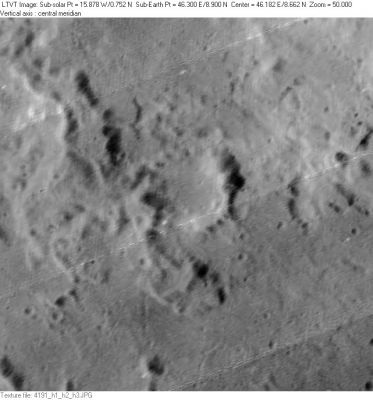
Lunar Orbiter 4 image

Watts is a small lunar impact crater that is located at the extreme northern edge of the Mare Fecunditatis. It was named after American astronomer Chester Burleigh Watts. Just one crater diameter to the northwest is the irregular da Vinci. Farther to the south is the larger crater Taruntius.

The rim of this crater is broken in the south and the interior is flooded with lava. The terrain about the crater has also been resurfaced by past lava flows, leaving on a low rim raised about the nearly level surroundings. The southwest rim is attached to a low rim that connects with da Vinci.

This crater was previously designated Taruntius D before being named by the IAU.
