= James Craig Watson Medal =

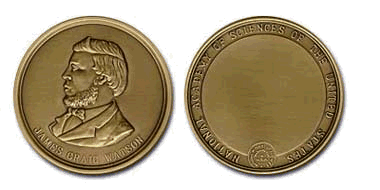
James Craig Watson Medal

The James Craig Watson Medal was established by the bequest of James Craig Watson, an astronomer the University of Michigan between 1863 and 1879, and is awarded every 1-4 years by the U.S. National Academy of Sciences for contributions to astronomy.

== Recipients ==
Year	Name	Image	Motivation
2026	Jonas Zmuidzinas		"For his seminal work designing and developing technologies and instruments to advance astrophysics."
2024	James Stone		"For his leading contributions to computational astrophysics."
2022	Samuel Harvey Moseley, Jr.		"For his seminal work designing and developing technologies and instruments to advance astronomy."
2020	Lisa Kewley		"For her fundamental contributions to our understanding of galaxy collisions, cosmic chemical abundances, galactic energetics, and the star-formation history of galaxies by elucidating key processes in star-forming galaxies, including nebular physics, accretion by supermassive black holes, and oxygen enrichment."
2018	Ewine van Dishoeck		"A world leader in the fields of molecular astronomy and astrochemistry, van Dishoeck employs observations, theory and experiments to explain the evolutionary traits that lead to the formation of stars and planets from interstellar gas and dust, as well as the chemical basis for the origin of life."
2016	Timothy M. Brown		"For his visionary scientific and technical advancements that have been critical to the fields of helioseismology, asteroseismology, and the emerging field of spectroscopy of transiting exoplanets, and for his critical role in helping a new generation of scientists and facilities to succeed."
2014	Robert Kirshner		"For his work with students using supernova light curves as calibrated standard candles, providing evidence for an accelerating expansion of the universe. The dark energy inferred from this result is one of the deepest mysteries of modern science."
2012	Jeremiah P. Ostriker		"For his seminal contributions to the theory of the interstellar and intergalactic medium, his cosmological simulations that help illuminate the formation and evolution of structure in the universe, his theoretical contribution to the existence of Dark Matter halos around galaxies, and his dedication to the scientific and academic communities through service as provost, builder of the Sloan Digital Sky Survey and as a mentor of generations of young astronomers."
2010	Margaret Geller		"For her role in critical discoveries concerning the large-scale structure of the Universe, for her insightful analyses of galaxies in groups and clusters, and for her being a model in mentoring young scientists."
2007	Roc M. Cutri		"For their monumental work in developing and completing the Two Micron All-Sky Survey, thus enabling a thrilling variety of explorations in astronomy and astrophysics."
2007	Michael F. Skrutskie		"For their monumental work in developing and completing the Two Micron All-Sky Survey, thus enabling a thrilling variety of explorations in astronomy and astrophysics."
2004	Vera Rubin		"For her seminal observations of dark matter in galaxies, large-scale relative motions of galaxies, and for generous mentoring of young astronomers, men and women."
2001	David Todd Wilkinson		"For elegant precision measurements by Wilkinson, his students, and their students, of universal radiation that is close to blackbody yet wonderfully rich in evidence of cosmic evolution."
1998	Eugene Shoemaker		"For their painstaking research, which led to the discovery of more than 800 asteroids and 32 comets, including their co-discovery of Comet Shoemaker-Levy, the first comet observed colliding with a planet."
1998	Carolyn Shoemaker		"For their painstaking research, which led to the discovery of more than 800 asteroids and 32 comets, including their co-discovery of Comet Shoemaker-Levy, the first comet observed colliding with a planet."
1994	Yasuo Tanaka		"For his leadership in X-ray astronomy since its beginning, and his crucial role in enabling the U.S./Japanese collaboration in the ASCA mission, a beautiful example of international cooperation in sciences."
1991	Maarten Schmidt		"First to grasp the extraordinary distances and luminosities of quasi-stellar sources and a pioneer in their use to probe the outer limits of our universe."
1986	Robert B. Leighton		"For his work as creator and exploiter of new instruments and techniques that have opened whole new areas of astronomy to us all--solar oscillations, infrared surveys, spun telescopes, and large millimeter-wave reflectors."
1985	Kent Ford		"For his work in the area of image enhancement and galactic dynamics, which has contributed greatly to the characterization of the unseen matter in galaxies."
1982	Stanton J. Peale		"For his contributions to the dynamics of solar-system bodies, especially for calculations leading to the prediction of volcanic action on Io, dramatically verified by Voyager photography."
1979	Charles Kowal		"For his noteworthy astronomical discoveries, particularly of Chiron, Leda, and numerous supernovae."
1975	Gerald Maurice Clemence		"For his long and distinguished career in Dynamical Astronomy and his independent determination of a completely new and more accurate Theory of the Motion of Mars."
1972	André Deprit		"In recognition of his resolution of the problem of lunar motion around the earth through his adaption of modern computing machinery to algebraic rather than arithmetic operations."
1969	Jürgen Moser		
1966	Wallace John Eckert		"For his pioneering contributions to scientific computing and to the theory of the motion of the moon."
1965	Paul Herget		"For his scientific accomplishments in celestial mechanics and orbit computation, and particularly for his contributions to the knowledge of the orbits of asteroids."
1964	Willem Jacob Luyten		"For his outstanding contributions to the understanding of "white-dwarf" stars."
1961	Otto Heckmann		
1960	Yusuke Hagihara		"In recognition of his noteworthy contributions to astronomy."
1957	George Van Biesbroeck		"For his noteworthy contributions to astronomy."
1955	Chester Burleigh Watts		
1951	Herbert Rollo Morgan		"For his distinguished contributions to fundamental astronomy, more specifically his interpretation of transit circle observations."
1948	Samuel Alfred Mitchell		"For his observations of solar eclipses, in particular a detailed study of the spectrum of the chromosphere which has contributed notably to our knowledge of the sun's atmosphere."
1936	Ernest William Brown		
1929	Willem de Sitter		"In recognition of his research in astronomy."
1924	Carl Charlier		"For his outstanding contributions to astronomical science concerning motion and distribution of the stars, and in celestial mechanics."
1916	Armin Otto Leuschner		"For the skill and ability shown in supervising the preparation of the tables of the Watson asteroids, involving original methods, and leading to results of value to celestial mechanics."
1913	Jacobus Cornelius Kapteyn		"In recognition of his bold and penetrating researches in the problem of the structure of the stellar universe."
1899	David Gill		"For his work in perfecting the application of heliometer to astronomical measurements, which has resulted in an important advance in astronomy of precision, especially in the determination of parallaxes of the sun and stars and of the position of the planets."
1894	Seth Carlo Chandler		"For his researches on the variations of latitude."
1891	Arthur Auwers		"For his researches in sidereal astronomy, including the reduction of Bradley's observations."
1889	Eduard Schönfeld		"For his services in cataloguing and mapping the stars visible in our latitudes, and especially for his recently published southern Durchmusterung."
1887	Benjamin Apthorp Gould		"For his valuable labors for nearly forty years in promoting the progress of astronomical science."

Source:National Academy of Sciences

== See also ==
- List of astronomy awards
- List of awards named after people
