= Jean-Baptiste Bourguignon d'Anville =

French cartographer and geographer (1697–1782)

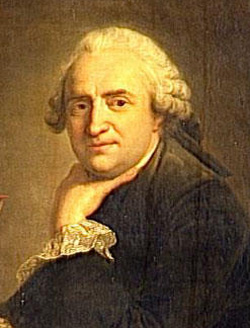
- Born: 11 July 1697; Paris, Kingdom of France
- Died: 28 January 1782 (aged 84); Paris, Kingdom of France
- Occupations: Cartographer; Geographer

Jean-Baptiste Bourguignon d'Anville (French pronunciation: [ʒɑ̃ batist buʁgiɲɔ̃ dɑ̃vil]; born in Paris 11 July 1697 – 28 January 1782) was a French geographer and cartographer who greatly improved the standards of map-making. D'Anville became cartographer to the king, who purchased his cartographic materials, the largest collection in France. He made more than 200 maps during his lifetime, which are characterized by a careful, accurate work largely based on original research. In particular, D'Anville left unknown areas of continents blank and noted doubtful information as such, contrary to the lavish maps of his predecessors. His maps remained the reference point in cartography throughout the 19th century and were used by numerous explorers and travellers.

== Biography ==
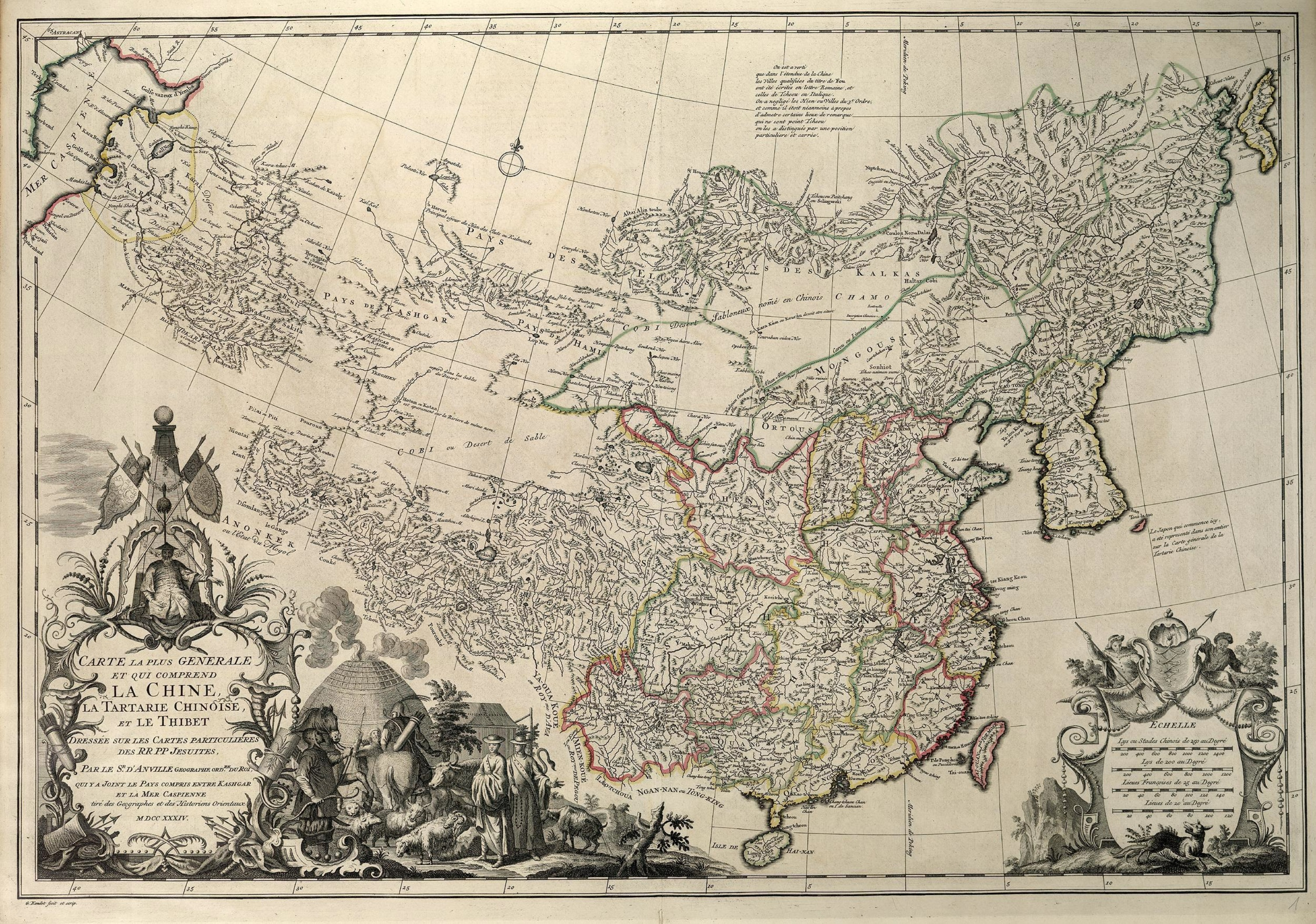
d'Anville's map of China and Central Asia (1734) for du Halde's "Description geographique de la Chine", compiled based on the first systematic geographic survey of the entire Chinese Empire by a team of French Jesuits (c. 1700)

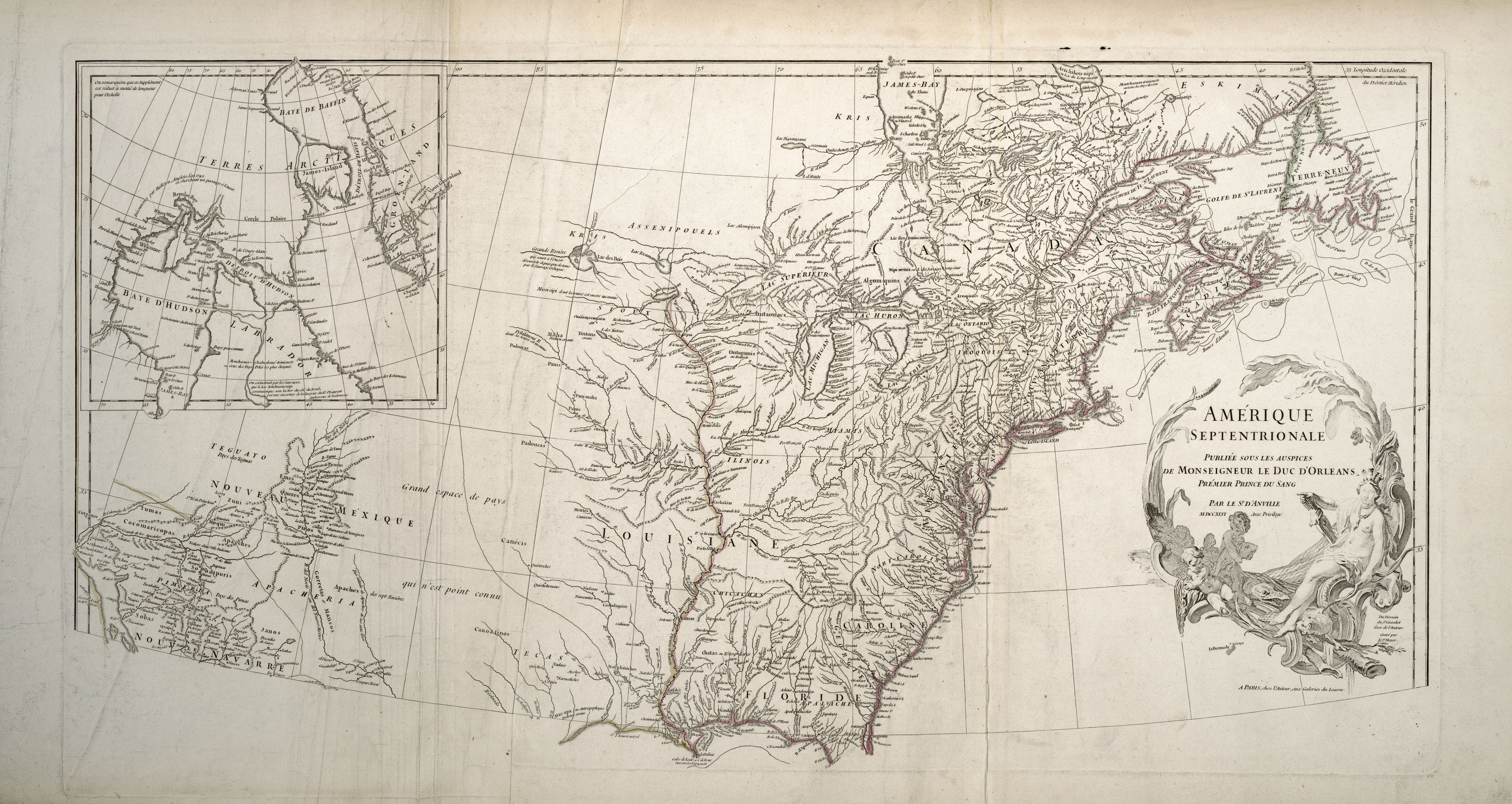
D'Anville's two-part 1746 map Amérique Septentrionale

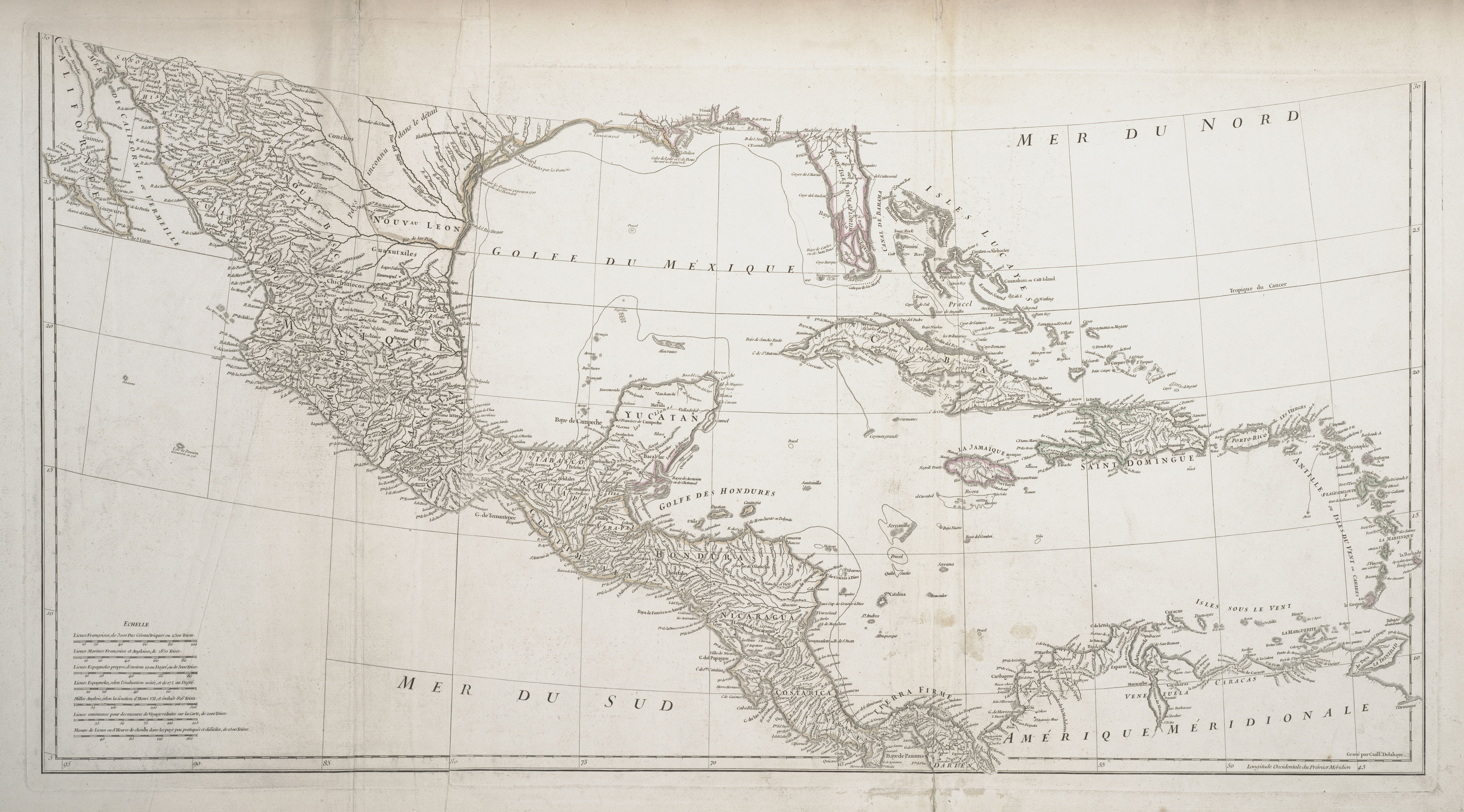

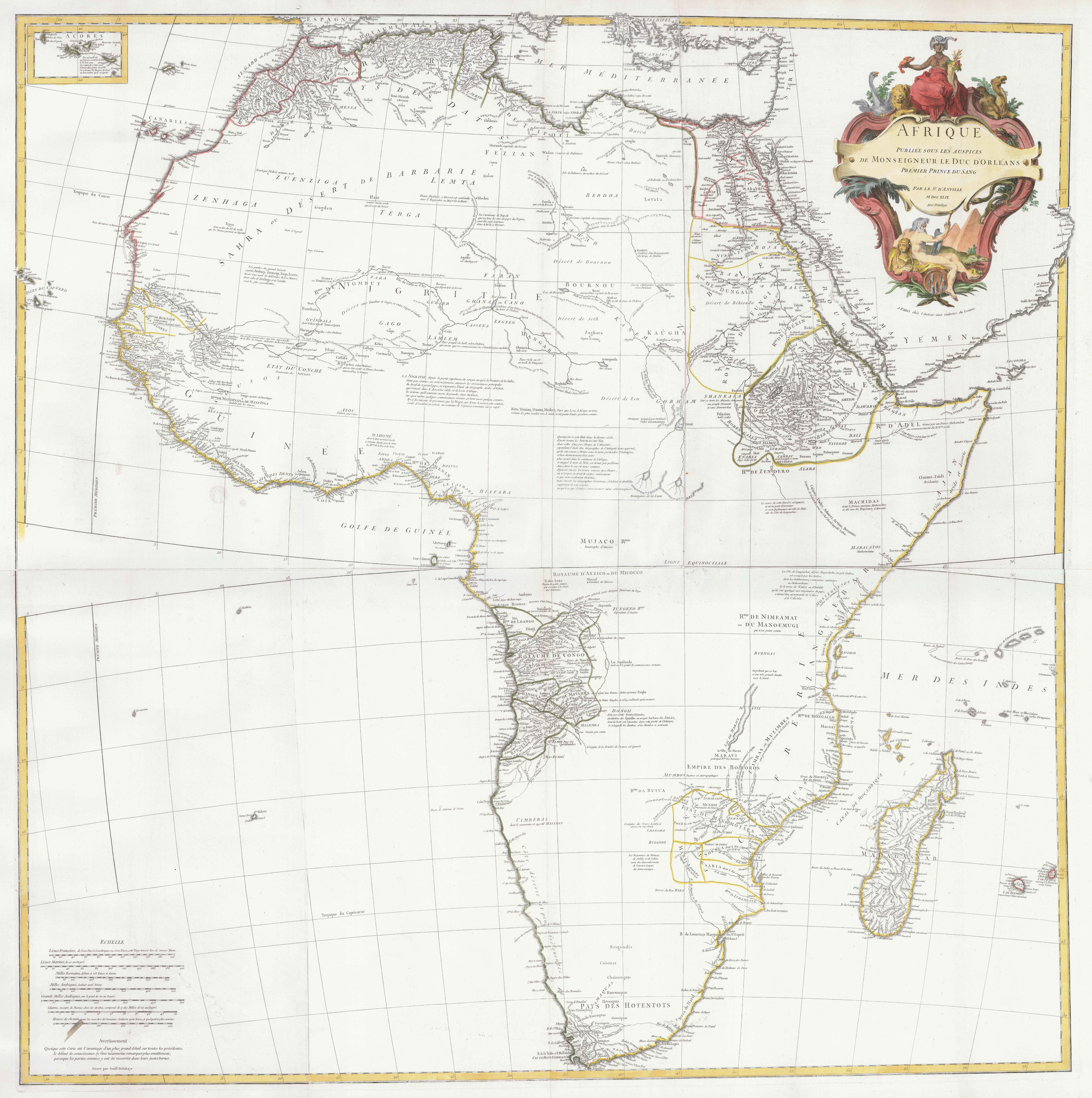
d'Anville's 1749 map Afrique

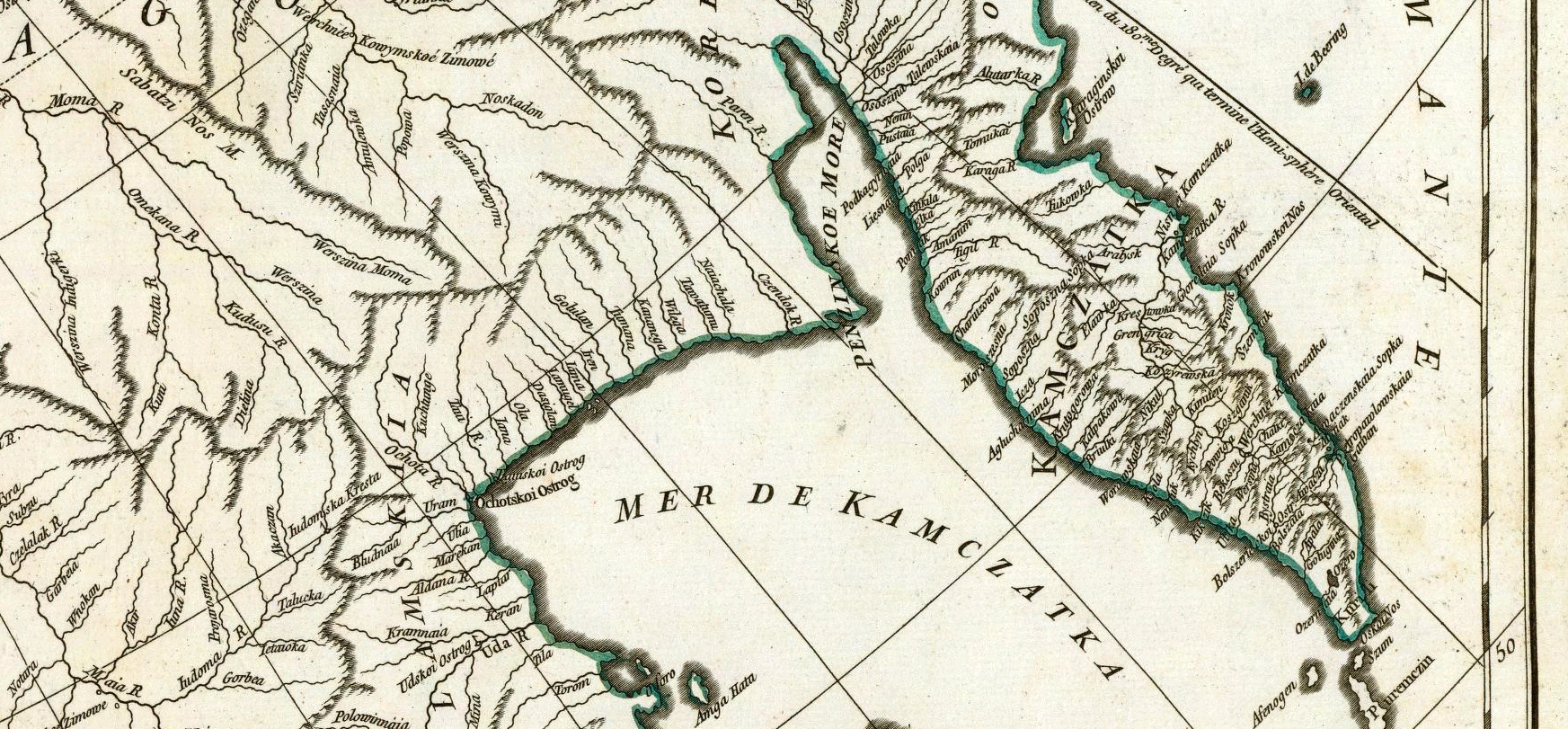
Jean-Baptiste Bourguignon d'Anville: Troisième partie de la carte d'Asie, contenant la Sibérie, et quelques autres parties de la Tartarie, Paris (1753)

Jean-Baptiste Bourguignon d'Anville was born in Paris on 11 July 1697, in the Kingdom of France. His passion for geographical research displayed itself from early years: aged twelve he was already amusing himself by drawing maps for Latin authors. Later, his friendship with the antiquarian, Abbé Longuerue, greatly aided his studies.

His first serious map, that of Ancient Greece, was published when he was fifteen. At the age of twenty-two, he was appointed one the king's geographers, and began to attract the attention of first authorities. D'Anville's studies embraced everything of geographical nature in the world's literature, as far as he could muster it: for this purpose, he not only searched ancient and modern historians, travelers and narrators of every description, but also poets, orators and philosophers. One of his cherished subjects was to reform geography by putting an end to the blind copying of older maps, by testing the commonly accepted positions of places through a rigorous examination of all the descriptive authority, and by excluding from cartography every name inadequately supported. Vast spaces, which had before been bordered with countries and cities, were thus suddenly reduced mostly to a blank.

D'Anville was at first employed in the humbler task of illustrating by maps the works of different travellers, such as Marchais, Charlevoix, Labat and du Halde. For the description of China by the last-named writer he was employed to make an atlas, which was published separately at the Hague in 1737. Information for the maps of China came from land surveys made across the Chinese empire by the order of the Kangxi Emperor from 1708–1716. D'Anville's China maps were called the "standard Western source for the geography of China and adjacent regions," throughout the 19th century.

In 1735 and 1736, he brought out two treatises on the figure of the earth; but these attempts to solve geometrical problems by literary material were, to a great extent, refuted by Maupertuis' measurements of a degree within the polar circle. D'Anville's historical method was more successful in his 1743 map of Italy, which first indicated numerous errors in the mapping of that country and was accompanied by a valuable mémoir (a novelty in such work), showing in full the sources of the design. A trigonometrical survey which Benedict XIV soon after had made in the papal states strikingly confirmed the French geographer's results. In his later years d'Anville did yeoman service for ancient and medieval geography, accomplishing something like a revolution in the former; mapping afresh all the chief countries of the pre-Christian civilizations (especially Egypt), and by his Mémoire et abrégé de géographie ancienne et générale and his États formés en Europe après la chute de l'empire romain en occident (1771) rendering his labours still more generally useful. His last employment consisted in arranging his collection of maps, plans and geographical materials. It was the most extensive in Europe, and had been purchased by the king, who, however, left him the use of it during his life. This task performed, he sank into a total imbecility both of mind and body, which continued for two years, until his death in January 1782.

== Honors ==
In 1754, at the age of fifty-seven, he became a member of the Académie des Inscriptions et Belles Lettres, whose transactions he enriched with many papers. In 1773, he became adjoint géographe of the Académie des Sciences, and in the same year was appointed first geographer to the king. He was also a member of the Society of Antiquaries of London and the Russian Academy of Sciences.

A street was named after him 82 years after his death in the 14th arrondissement of Paris, and his statue was placed on the city's Hotel de Ville in 1881.

The crater Anville on the Moon and the community of Danville, Vermont are also named after him.

== Bibliography ==
D'Anville's published memoirs and dissertations amounted to 78, and his maps to 211. A complete edition of his works was announced in 1806 by de Manne in 6 vols. quarto, but only two had appeared when the editor died in 1832. See Bon-Joseph Dacier, Éloge de d'Anville (Paris, 1802). Besides the separate works noticed above, d'Anville's maps executed for Rollin's Histoire ancienne and Histoire romaine, and his Traité des mesures anciennes et modernes (1769), deserve special notice.

- Pere J. B. du Halde with maps by d'Anville, "Description geographique de la Chine", 1735.
- "Nouvel Atlas de la Chine", 1737 (digitized version).
- "Atlas General", circa 1740.
- "Geographie Ancienne et Abregee", 1769.
