= Lucius Tarutius Firmanus =

Astrologer, astronomer and mathematician

Lucius Tarutius Firmanus (or Lucius Tarutius of Firmum) (unknown-fl. 86 BC) was a Roman philosopher, mathematician, and astrologer (Taruntius or Tarrutius are also used, but are incorrect).

Tarutius was a close friend of both Marcus Terentius Varro and Cicero. At Varro's request, Tarutius took the horoscope of Romulus. After studying the circumstances of the life and death of the founder of Rome, Tarutius calculated that Romulus was born on March 24 (when the date is correctly translated from the Egyptian calendar) in the second year of the second Olympiad (i.e. 771 BC). He also calculated that Rome was founded on 4 October 754 BC, between the second and third hour of the day (Plutarch, Rom., 12; Cicero, De Divin., ii. 47.). The proximity of this date to an eclipse was discussed by Scaliger.

The crater Taruntius on the Moon is named after him.

== See also ==
- Tarutius
