= Anville (crater) =

Crater on the Moon

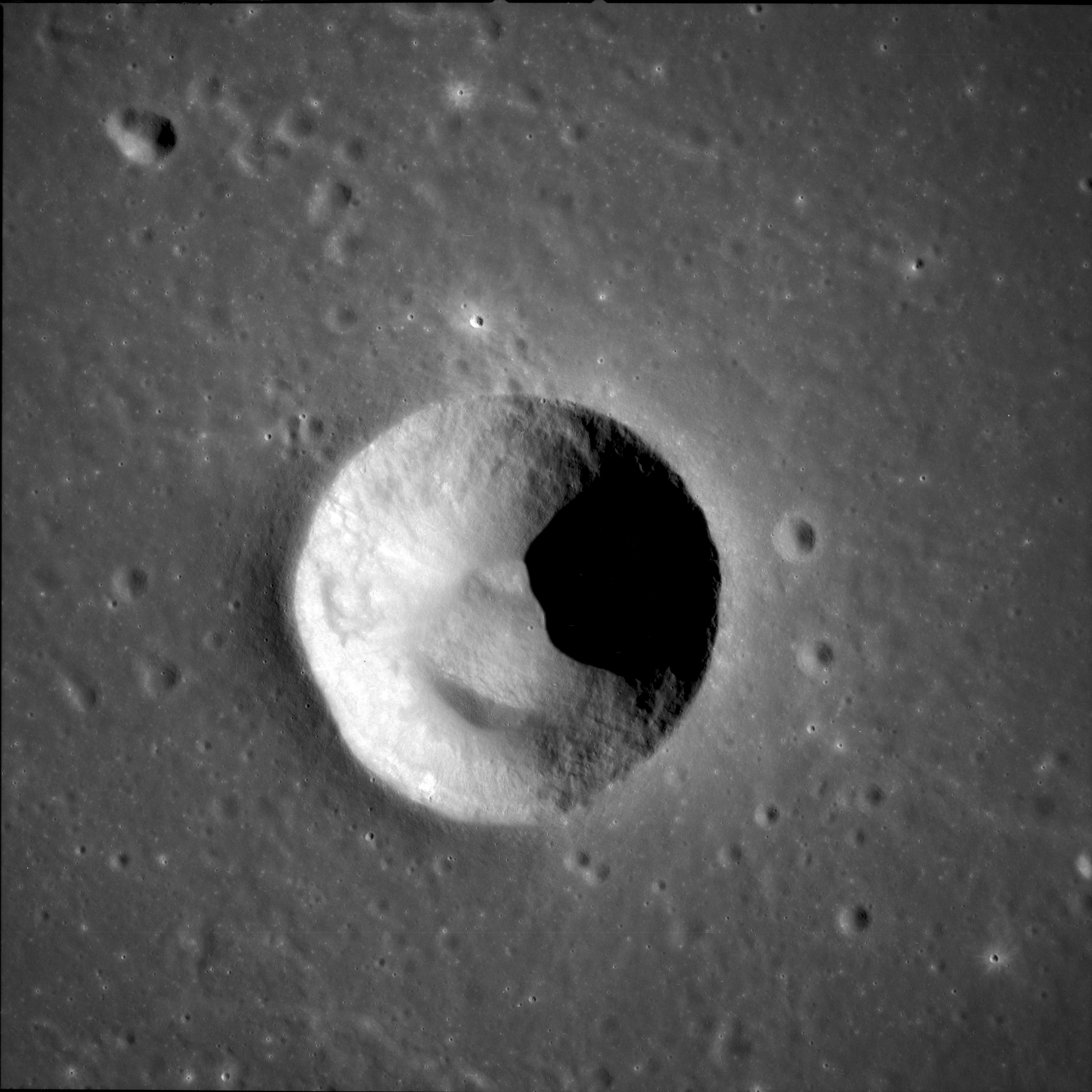
- Lunar crater Anville from Apollo 11. NASA photo.
- Coordinates: 1.9°N 49.5°E
- Diameter: 10.26 km (6.38 mi)
- Depth: 1.72 km (1.07 mi)
- Colongitude: 311° at sunrise
- Eponym: Jean-Baptiste d'Anville

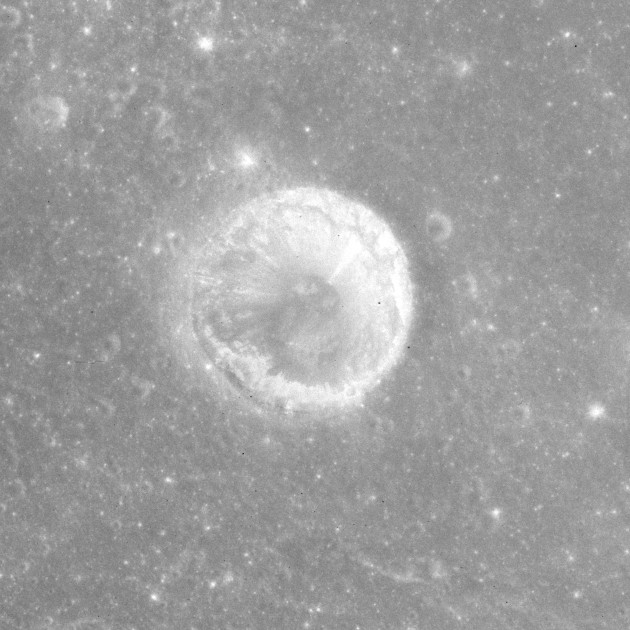
Apollo 15 mapping camera image

Anville is a relatively small, solitary lunar impact crater located in the north part of the Mare Fecunditatis. This is a circular, cup-shaped formation with a sharp edge and little appearance of wear. Some minor slumping has occurred in the eastern half of the interior wall.

This crater is named after French cartographer Jean-Baptiste d'Anville (1697-1782). It was designated Taruntius G prior to being assigned a name by the IAU in 1976. Taruntius itself lies to the north-northwest, at the edge of the mare.
