= Lawrence (crater) =

Crater on the Moon

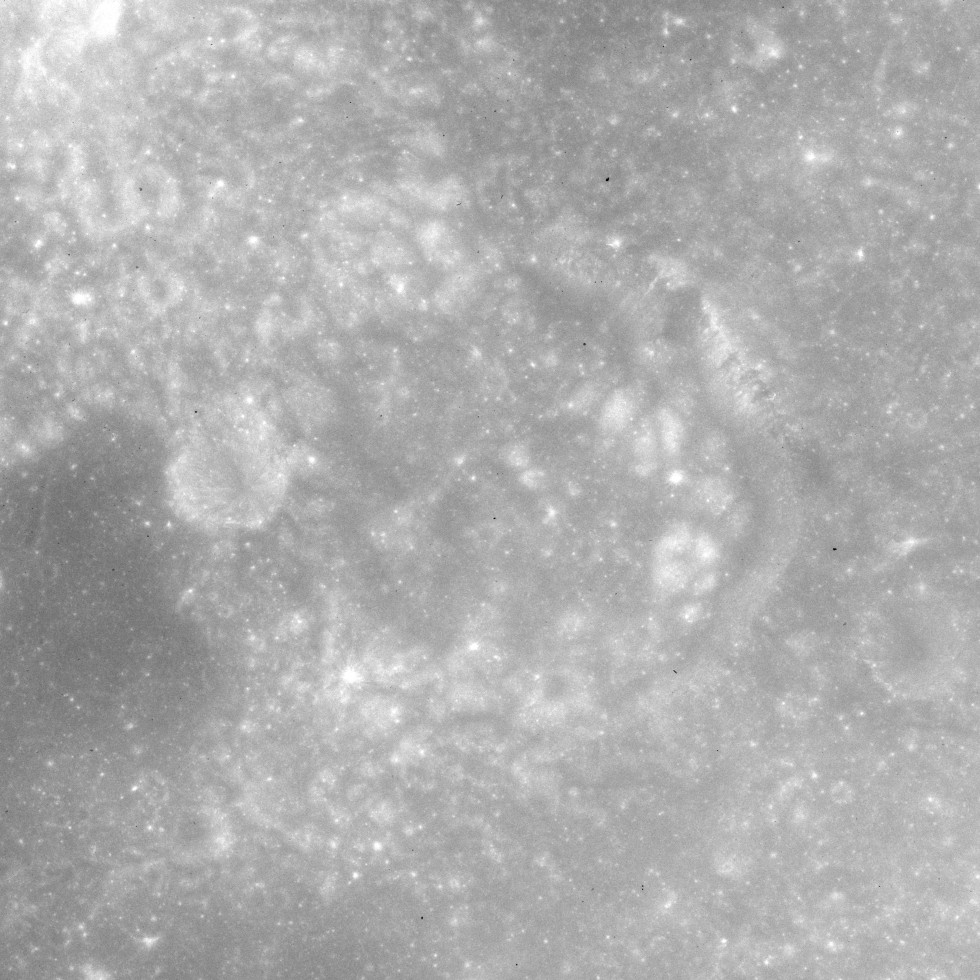
- Apollo 15 mapping camera image
- Coordinates: 7.4°N 43.2°E
- Diameter: 24 km
- Depth: 1.0 km
- Colongitude: 317° at sunrise
- Eponym: Ernest Lawrence and Robert H. Lawrence, Jr.

Lawrence is a lunar impact crater that is located on a section of terrain to the east of Mare Tranquillitatis and northwest of Mare Fecunditatis. To the southeast is the larger crater Taruntius. The rille designated Rima Cauchy crosses the eastern part of the Mare Tranquillitatis and reaches as far as the northern rim of Lawrence.

This crater has been flooded by lava, leaving only a shallow ring of a rim projecting above the surface. The rim has breaks in the north and southwest, with the most intact portion in the east.

This crater was named after American physicist and Nobel laureate Ernest Lawrence and American astronaut Robert Henry Lawrence, Jr.. Previously, it was designated Taruntius M.
