= Winifred Cameron =

American astronomer (1918–2016)

- Winifred S. Cameron, from a 1964 newspaper
- Born: Winifred J. Sawtell; December 3, 1918; Oak Park, Illinois
- Died: March 29, 2016 (aged 97); Lehigh Acres, Florida
- Occupation: Astronomer
- Known for: Worked on Gemini, Apollo programs
- Notable work: Lunar Transient Phenomena database
- Spouse: Robert Curry Cameron

Winifred Sawtell Cameron (December 3, 1918 – March 29, 2016) was an American astronomer. She worked at Goddard Space Flight Center in Maryland for most of her career, and compiled the Lunar Transient Phenomena (LTP) database. She was involved in the Gemini and Apollo programs.

== Early life ==
Winifred J. Sawtell was born in Oak Park, Illinois, the daughter of Amos Alexander Sawtell and Mildred Winifred Shields Sawtell. Her father was an accountant. She was a Girl Scout, and graduated from Oak Park and River Forest High School in 1936. She earned a bachelor's degree and a teaching credential at Northern Illinois University in 1940, and completed a master's degree in astronomy at Indiana University Bloomington in 1952.

== Career ==
After college, Sawtell worked at Weather Forecasts, Inc. in Chicago, from 1943 to 1946, and again from 1949 to 1950. She taught astronomy at Mount Holyoke College from 1950 to 1951. She was a researcher at the United States Naval Observatory from 1951 to 1958, analyzing sunspots.

In 1959, Winifred Cameron and her husband both joined NASA's new Goddard Space Flight Center, where she was a lunar expert and head of Data Acquisition and Analysis. She compiled the Lunar Transient Phenomena (LTP) database, still in use. She was astronomer-on-base at Cape Canaveral during two Mercury flights, and an advisor on the Apollo Moon landings. She was the only woman scientist in attendance at the international Lunar Geological Field Conference in Oregon in 1965. She gave frequent talks on her work to civic organizations, schools, and amateur astronomers.

In 1974, Cameron was a technologist at the National Space Science Data Center in Greenbelt, Maryland. She retired from NASA in 1984, but continued working on the LTP database. She was a member of the International Astronomical Union, the American Astronomical Society, the American Geophysical Union, and the Association of Lunar and Planetary Observers.

== Personal life ==
Winifred Sawtell married fellow astronomer Robert Curry Cameron in 1953. They had two daughters, Selene and Sheri. Robert died in 1972. Winifred died in 2016, aged 97, in Lehigh Acres, Florida.

There is an asteroid named 1575 Winifred, after Cameron; and she named a lunar crater Cameron in memory of her husband.
