= Joseph Zähringer =

German physicist

Joseph Zähringer (often written Josef, March 15, 1929 – July 22, 1970) was a German physicist.

From 1949 until 1954 he attended the Universität Freiburg, studying physics, mathematics, chemistry and mineralogy. In 1955 he became an assistant at the university, and in 1956 he came to the Brookhaven National Laboratory in Upton, New York. By 1958 he joined the Max Planck Institute for Nuclear Physics in Heidelberg, Germany as an assistant. He eventually became the director of the institute in 1965.

His contributions to astronomy included the study of gas isotopes in meteorites and lunar materials. The crater Zähringer on the Moon is named after him.

At Brookhaven National Laboratory, Zahringer worked with Oliver Schaeffer's cosmochemistry group applying mass spectrometry techniques to the study of rare gases in meteorites. These studies were largely related to determining the exposure ages of meteorites to cosmic rays in space. Zahringer contributed much of the mass spectrometer technology from the MPI-Heidelberg. From this period until his death, Zahringer collaborated with Schaeffer who had moved on to found the Earth and Space Sciences Department at Stony Brook University. This collaboration included work on the Apollo 11 & 12 missions.
