= Zwicky =

Zwicky is a surname. Notable people with the surname include:

- Arnold Zwicky (born 1940), American linguist
- Fay Zwicky (1933–2017), Australian poet and academic
- Fritz Zwicky, astrophysicist who proposed dark matter, or objects named after him:
  - Zwicky (crater), crater on the Moon
  - 1803 Zwicky, asteroid
- Jan Zwicky (born 1955), Canadian poet
- Rolf Zwicky (born 1957), Swiss sailor
- Tommy Zwicky, Danish journalist and television presenter
- Zwicky Engineering Limited, a manufacturer of compression valves
