= Bergstrand =

Bergstrand is a surname. Notable people with the surname include:

- Daniel Bergstrand, Swedish record producer
- Finn Bergstrand (born 1932), Swedish diplomat
- Kristina Bergstrand (born 1963), Swedish ice hockey player
- Nanne Bergstrand (born 1956), Swedish footballer and manager
- Östen Bergstrand (1873–1948), Swedish astronomer

== See also ==
- Bergstrand (crater), a lunar crater
