= NGC 5755 =

Galaxy in the constellation Boötes

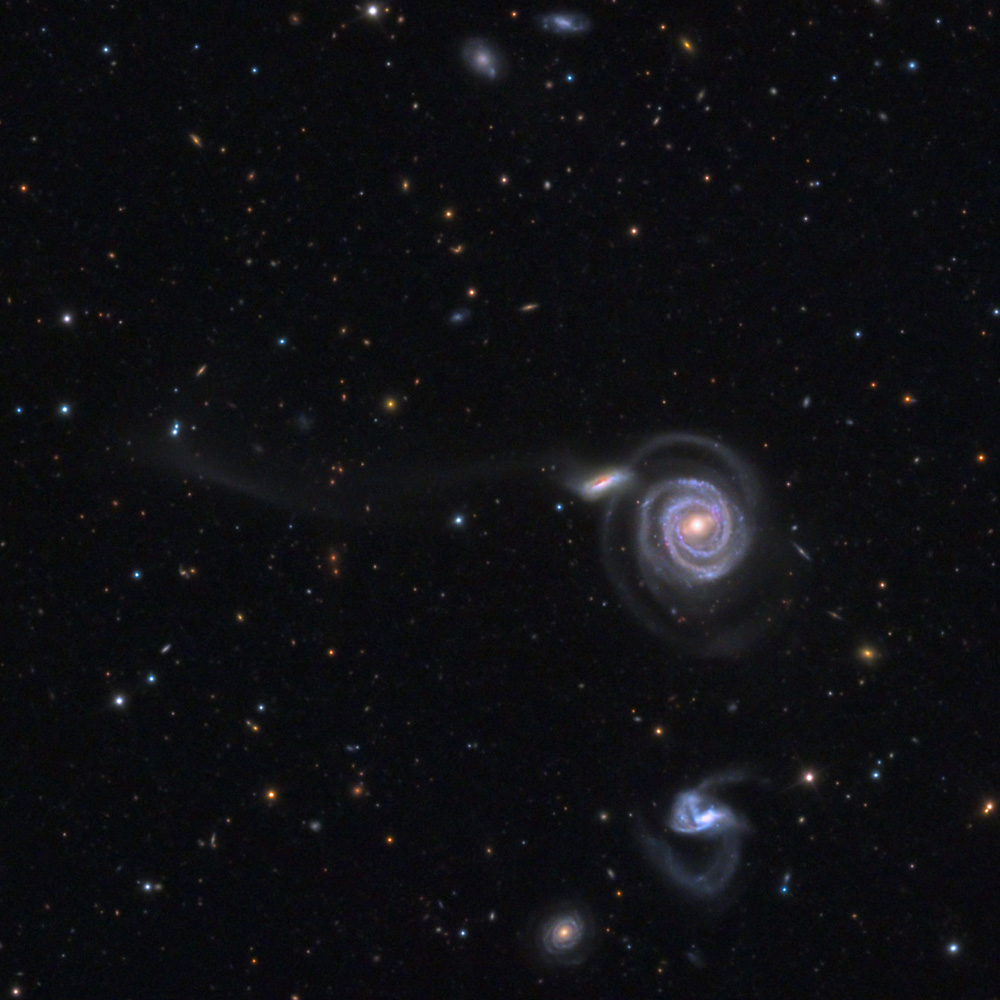
- NGC 5755 (below, right), NGC 5753 (bottom, just right of center), NGC 5754 (center, right) and NGC 5752 (nearest center)

Observation data (J2000 epoch)
- Constellation: Boötes
- Right ascension: 14^{h} 45^{m} 24.525^{s}
- Declination: +38° 46′ 47.73″
- Redshift: 0.032229 ± 0.000153
- Distance: 427 Mly (130.8 Mpc)
- Apparent magnitude (V): 13.742±0.004

Characteristics
- Type: SB?
- Apparent size (V): 0.553′ × 0.321′
- Notable features: paired with NGC 5753

Other designations
- 2MASX J14452452+3846477, CGCG 220.053, FIRST J144524.5+384647, IRAS 14434+3859, LEDA 52690, MCG+07-30-063, NVSS J144524+384647, PGC 52690, UGC 9507, Z 1443.4+3859, Z 220-53

NGC 5755 is a barred spiral galaxy in the constellation Boötes, member of Arp 297 interacting galaxies group of four: NGC 5752, NGC 5753, NGC 5754, and NGC 5755.
