= KU Hydrae =

Star in the constellation Hydra

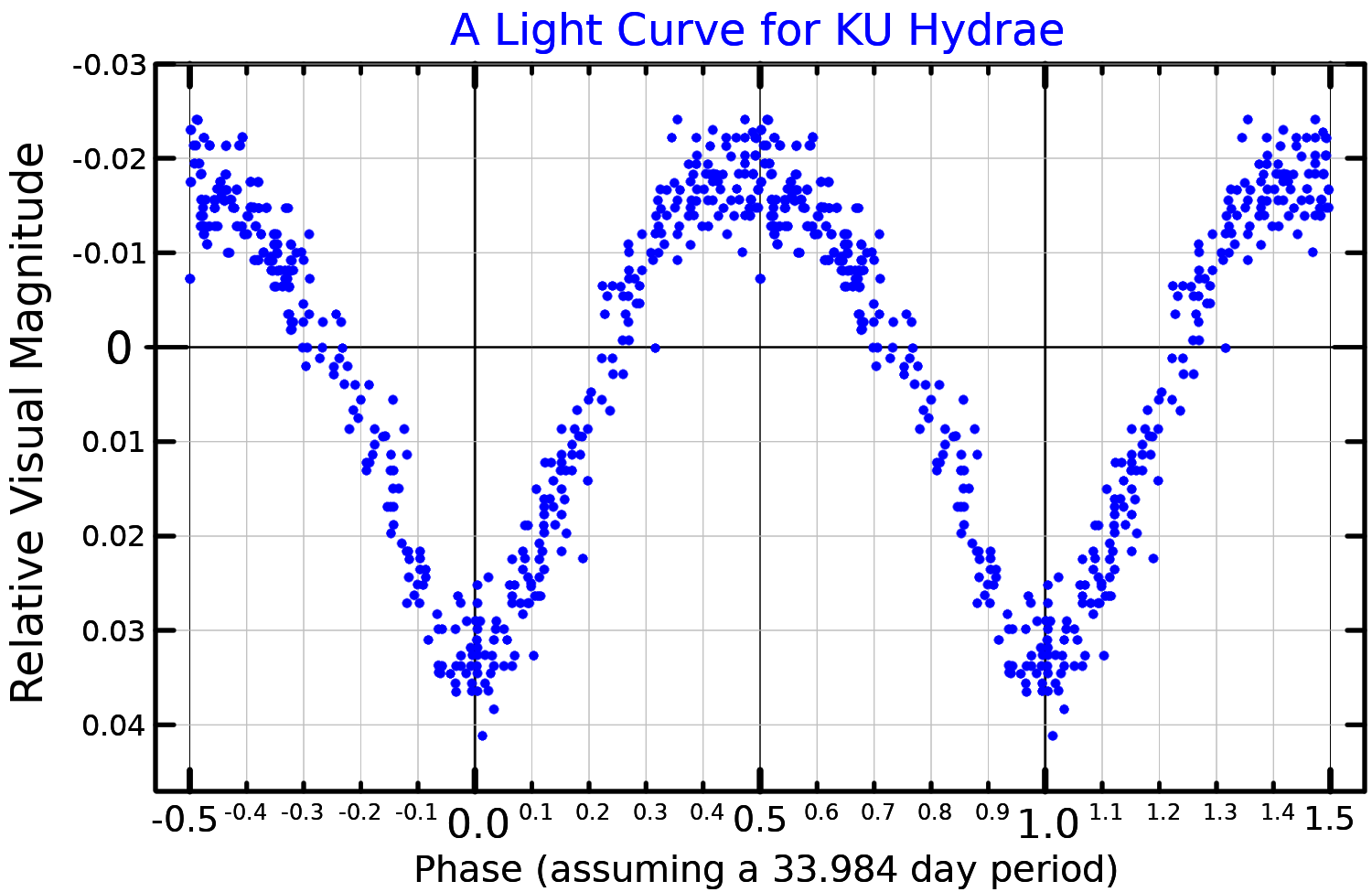
- A visual band light curve for KU Hydrae, adapted from Adelman (2006)

Observation data Epoch J2000 Equinox ICRS
- Constellation: Hydra
- Right ascension: 09^{h} 22^{m} 50.856^{s}
- Declination: −09° 50′ 19.66″
- Apparent magnitude (V): 6.51 to 6.53

Characteristics
- Spectral type: Ap EuCrSr
- U−B color index: +0.11
- B−V color index: +0.22
- Variable type: α^{2} CVn

Astrometry
Radial velocity (R_{v})	+19.6±5.0 km/s
Proper motion (μ)	RA: −27.94±0.61 mas/yr Dec.: −13.01±0.36 mas/yr
Parallax (π)	6.92±0.61 mas
Distance	470 ± 40 ly (140 ± 10 pc)

Orbit
Name	KU Hya B
Period (P)	52.98(37) yr
Semi-major axis (a)	0.169(1)″
Eccentricity (e)	0.074(8)
Inclination (i)	68.5(6)°
Longitude of the node (Ω)	202.4(4)°
Periastron epoch (T)	2020.20(45)
Argument of periastron (ω) (secondary)	58.7(3.3)°

Details

KU Hya A
Mass	2.07 M_{☉}

KU Hya B
Mass	2.05 M_{☉}

Other designations
- BD−09° 2816, HD 81009, HIP 45999, HR 3724, SAO 136799, A 1342

Database references
SIMBAD	data

KU Hydrae is a binary star in the constellation Hydra. The primary star is an Alpha2 Canum Venaticorum variable with its apparent magnitude varying from 0.05 magnitudes over a period of 33.97 days.

This star was discovered to be a visual binary star by Robert Grant Aitken in 1906 and was given the double star designation A 1342. Additional measurements of the position angle and angular separation showed a rapid orbital motion.
