= 3070 =

3070 may refer to:

== In general ==
- 3070, a number in the 3000 (number) range
- A.D. 3070, a year of the 4th millennium CE
- 3070 BC, a year in the 4th millennium BCE

== Roads numbered 3070 ==
- Hawaii Route 3070, a state highway
- Louisiana Highway 3070, a state highway
- Pennsylvania State Route 3070 (Chester County, Pennsylvania), a state highway
- Texas Farm to Market Road 3070. a state highway

== Other uses ==
- 3070 Aitken, an asteroid in the Asteroid Belt, the 3070th asteroid registered
- Richard Davis (techno artist) (born 1952, stagename "3070"), U.S. musician
- GeForce RTX 3070, a videocard
