= NGC 5857 =

Galaxy in the constellation Boötes

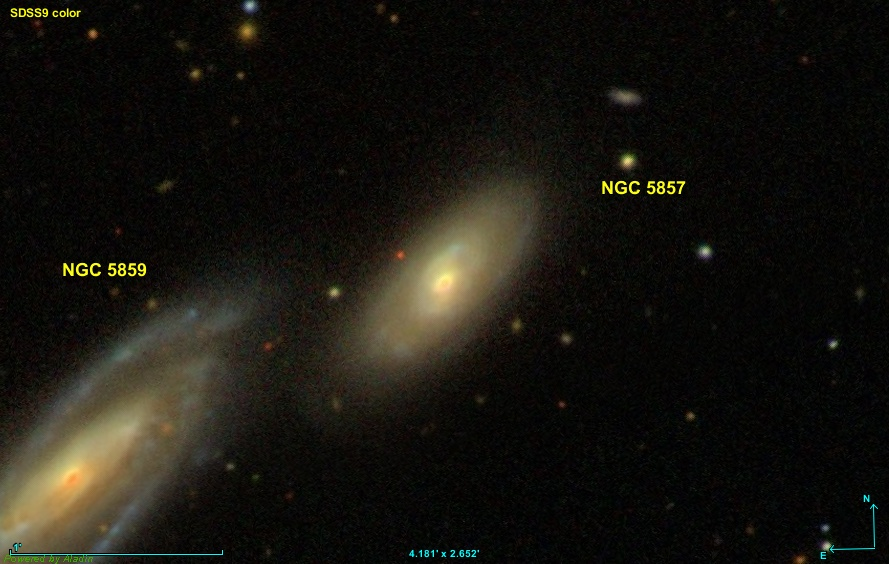
- NGC 5857 imaged by SDSS

Observation data (J2000 epoch)
- Constellation: Boötes
- Right ascension: 15^{h} 07^{m} 27.2818^{s}
- Declination: +19° 35′ 51.942″
- Redshift: 0.015834
- Heliocentric radial velocity: 4,747±2 km/s
- Distance: 236.3 ± 16.5 Mly (72.44 ± 5.07 Mpc)
- Group or cluster: NGC 5859 Group (LGG 394)
- Apparent magnitude (V): 13.1

Characteristics
- Type: SB(s)b
- Size: ~107,700 ly (33.03 kpc) (estimated)
- Apparent size (V): 1.2′ × 0.6′

Other designations
- UGC 9724, MCG +03-39-004, PGC 53995, CGCG 106-005

NGC 5857 is a barred spiral galaxy in the constellation of Boötes. Its velocity with respect to the cosmic microwave background for is 4,911±12 km/s, which corresponds to a Hubble distance of 236.3 ± 16.5 Mly (72.44 ± 5.07 Mpc). In addition, 20 non-redshift measurements give a distance of 228.85 ± 2.06 Mly (70.167 ± 0.633 Mpc). It was discovered by German-British astronomer William Herschel on 27 April 1788.

The SIMBAD database lists NGC 5857 as a Seyfert II Galaxy, i.e. it has a quasar-like nucleus with very high surface brightnesses whose spectra reveal strong, high-ionisation emission lines, but unlike quasars, the host galaxy is clearly detectable.

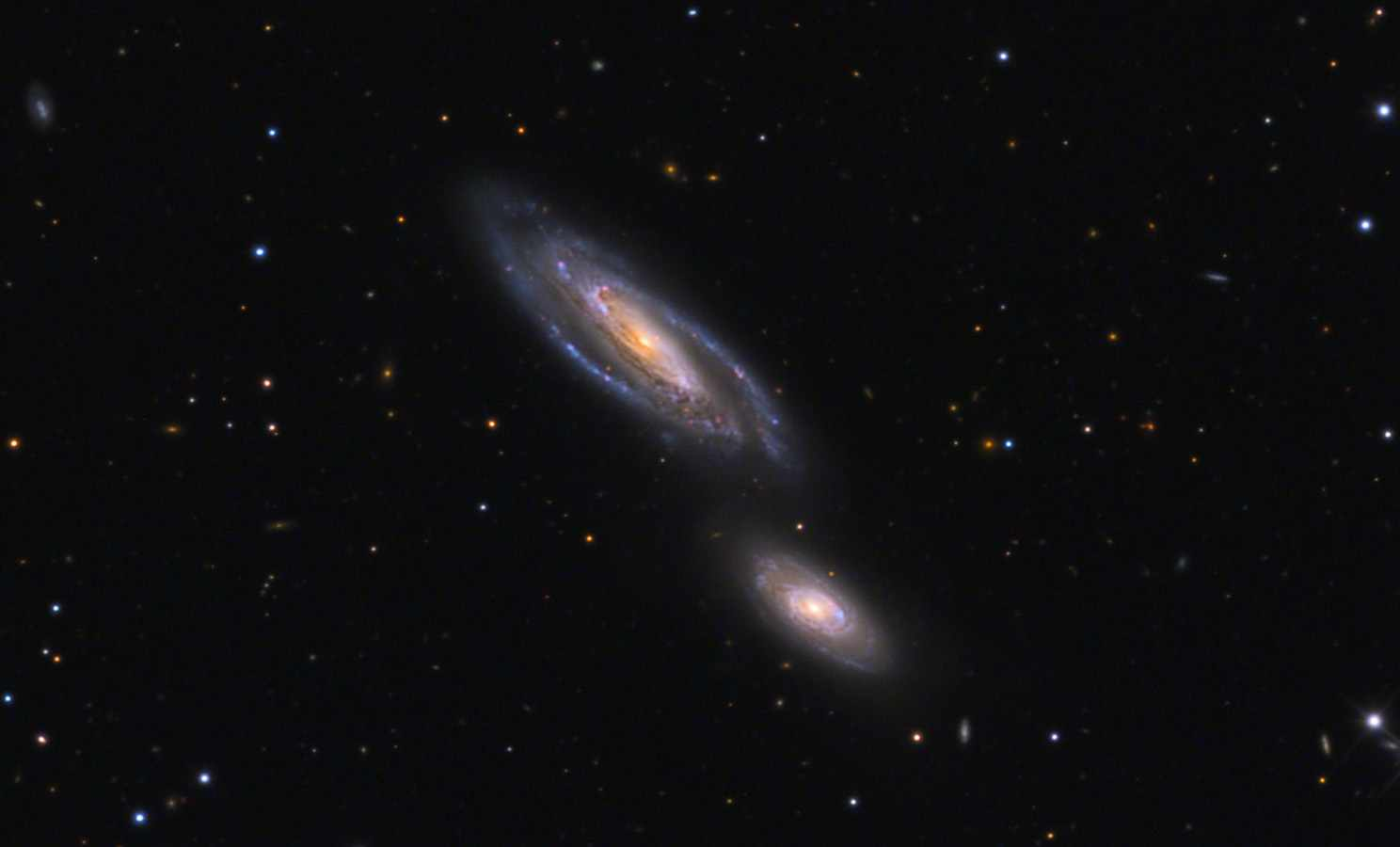
The galaxy pair NGC 5859 (top) and NGC 5857 (bottom) imaged by Adam Block

== NGC 5859 Group ==
According to A. M. Garcia, NGC 5857 is a member of the NGC 5859 galaxy group (also known as LGG 394). This group has six members, including NGC 5859, UGC 9620, UGC 9622, UGC 9672, and UGC 9777.

Abraham Mahtessian mentions that NGC 5857 and NGC 5859 form a pair of galaxies and they are in gravitational interaction.

== Supernovae ==
Two supernovae have been observed in NGC 5857:

- SN 1950H (type unknown, mag. 17.6) was discovered by Fritz Zwicky on 17 March 1950.
- SN 1955M (type unknown, mag. 14.5) was discovered by Fritz Zwicky on 14 May 1955.

== See also ==
- List of NGC objects (5001–6000)
