= NGC 250 =

Galaxy in the constellation Pisces

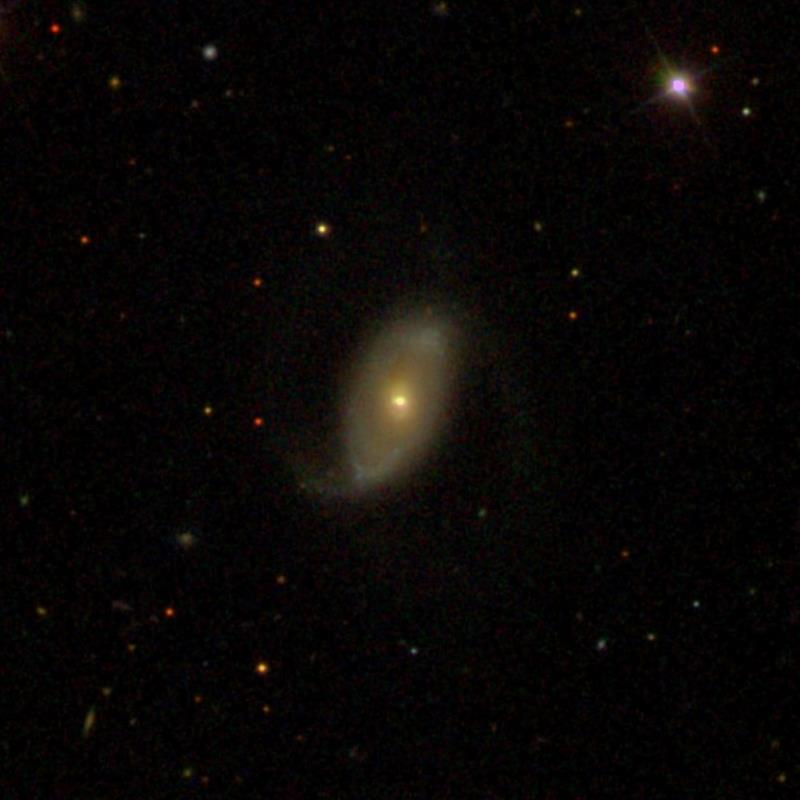
- SDSS image of NGC 250

Observation data (J2000 epoch)
- Constellation: Pisces
- Right ascension: 00^{h} 47^{m} 16.0^{s}
- Declination: +07° 54′ 36″
- Redshift: 0.017459
- Heliocentric radial velocity: 5234 ± 28 km/s
- Apparent magnitude (V): 14.63

Characteristics
- Type: S0/a^{−}
- Apparent size (V): 1.1′ × 0.6′

Other designations
- LEDA 2765, [HDL96] 410 5, IRAS 00446+0738, 2MASX J00471599+0754357, Z 0044.7+0739, IRAS F00446+0738, MCG+01-03-002, Z 410-5, UGC 487, PGC 2765

NGC 250 is a lenticular galaxy in the constellation Pisces.
