= NGC 5752 =

Galaxy in the constellation Boötes

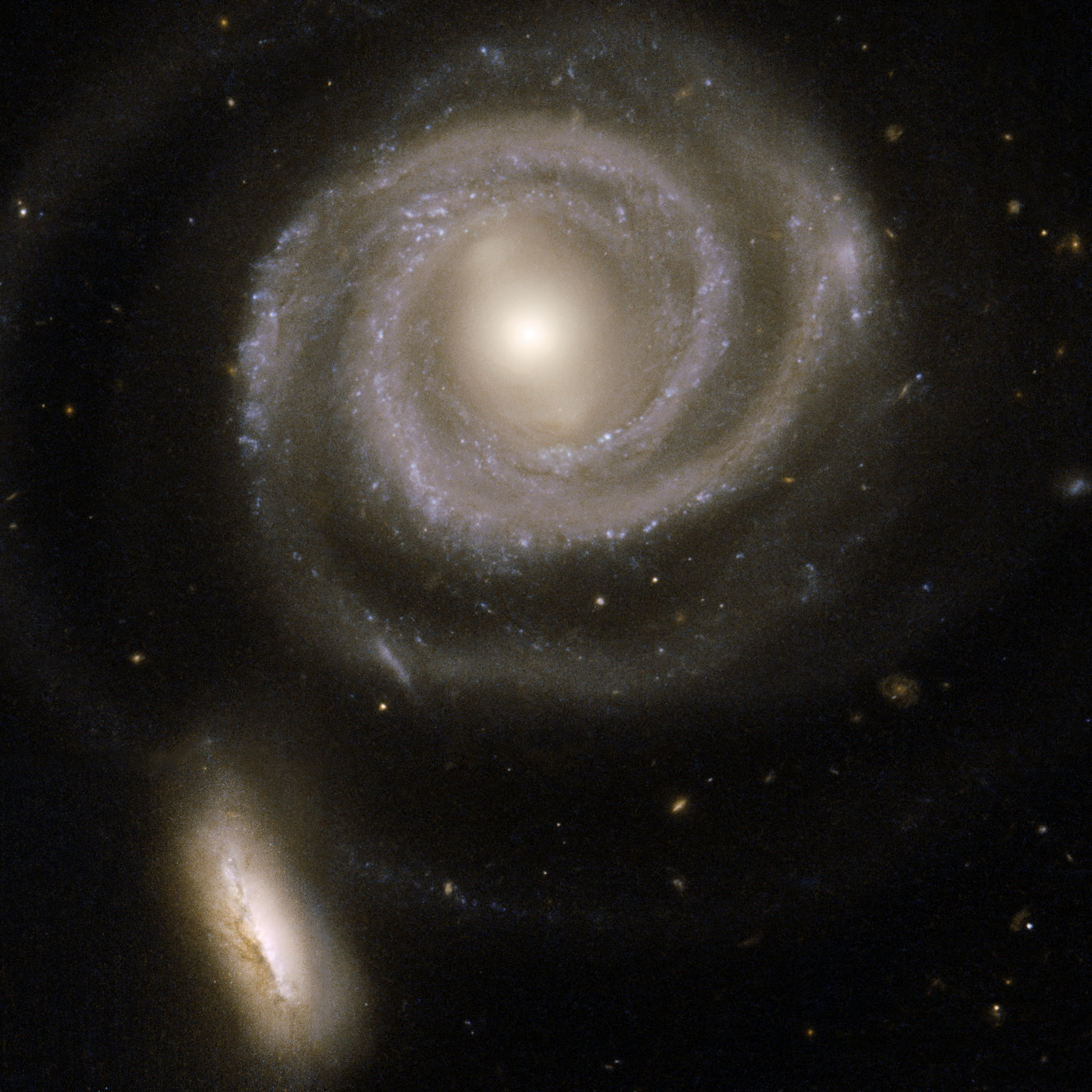
- NGC 5752 (bottom) and NGC 5754 by Hubble Space Telescope

Observation data (J2000 epoch)
- Constellation: Boötes
- Right ascension: 14^{h} 45^{m} 14.110^{s}
- Declination: +38° 43′ 43.62″
- Redshift: 0.015264 ± 0.000007
- Distance: 206 Mly (63.3 Mpc)
- Apparent magnitude (V): 15.3

Characteristics
- Type: Sab
- Apparent size (V): 0.730′ × 0.336'

Other designations
- 2MASX J14451411+3843436, CGCG 220.052, FIRST J144514.1+384343, IRAS 14432+3856, MCG+07-30-060, PGC 52685

NGC 5752 is a spiral galaxy in the constellation Boötes. It is a member of the Arp 297 interacting galaxies group which comprises four galaxies: NGC 5752, NGC 5753, NGC 5754, NGC 5755.
