= Zwicky (crater) =

Lunar impact crater

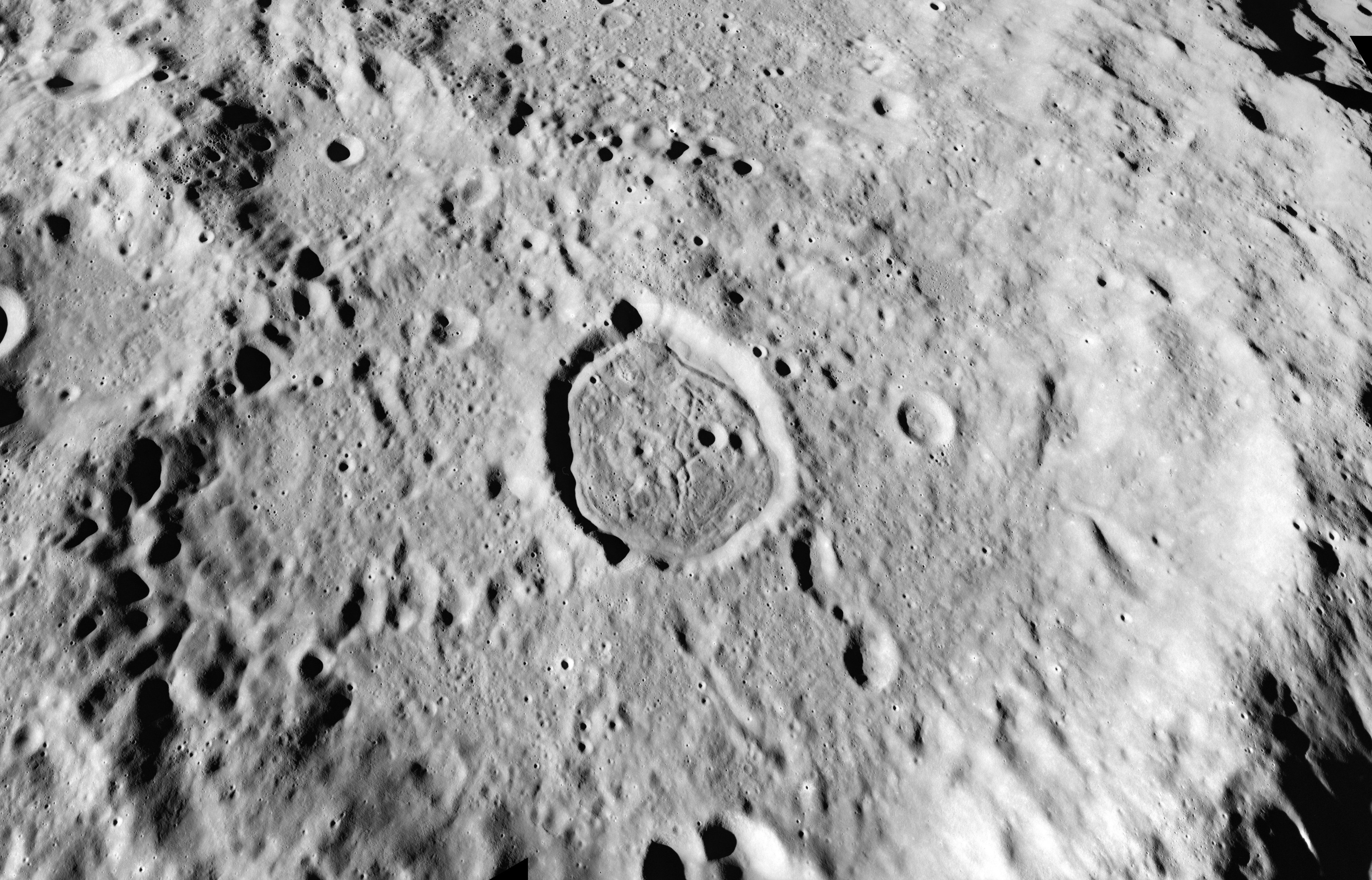
- Crater Zwicky (big eroded crater in the bottom and center of the image) as seen by a mapping camera attached to the Service Module of Apollo 17
- Coordinates: 16.17°S 167.64°E
- Diameter: 126.06 km (78.33 mi)
- Depth: 4.0 km (2.5 mi)
- Colongitude: 192° at sunrise
- Eponym: Fritz Zwicky (astronomer)

Zwicky is a lunar impact crater that is located on the far side of the Moon. It lies to the west of the crater Aitken, and is attached to the western rim of Vertregt. Attached to the northern end of Zwicky is Heaviside. Zwicky is a considerably eroded formation with an irregular rim and interior. Portions of the southern rim still survive, but the remainder has been almost completely eradicated.

The satellite crater Zwicky N, located in the midst of the interior of Zwicky, has a relatively dark floor by comparison with the surrounding terrain. This smaller crater has a polygonal outline with relatively smooth inner walls. The interior floor is a lower albedo material that has a fractured surface. It is thought that this is caused by the cooling of molten material, or possibly tectonic movement. This is referred to informally as a "turtleback crater floor".

The crater was named in 1974 by the IAU after astronomer Fritz Zwicky (1898–1974), a professor at Caltech, Pasadena, and pioneer in the study of supernovae and of galaxy clusters. The minor planet 1803 Zwicky is also named in his honour.

Zwicky crater was known as Crater 306 prior to naming.

== Satellite craters ==
By convention these features are identified on lunar maps by placing the letter on the side of the crater midpoint that is closest to Zwicky. Zwicky N crater had the proposed name of Ibn Hayyan, but this was not approved by the IAU.

Zwicky	Coordinates	Diameter, km
N	15.92°S 167.57°E	29.6
R	18.13°S 163.59°E	29.0
S	16.09°S 162.79°E	45.6

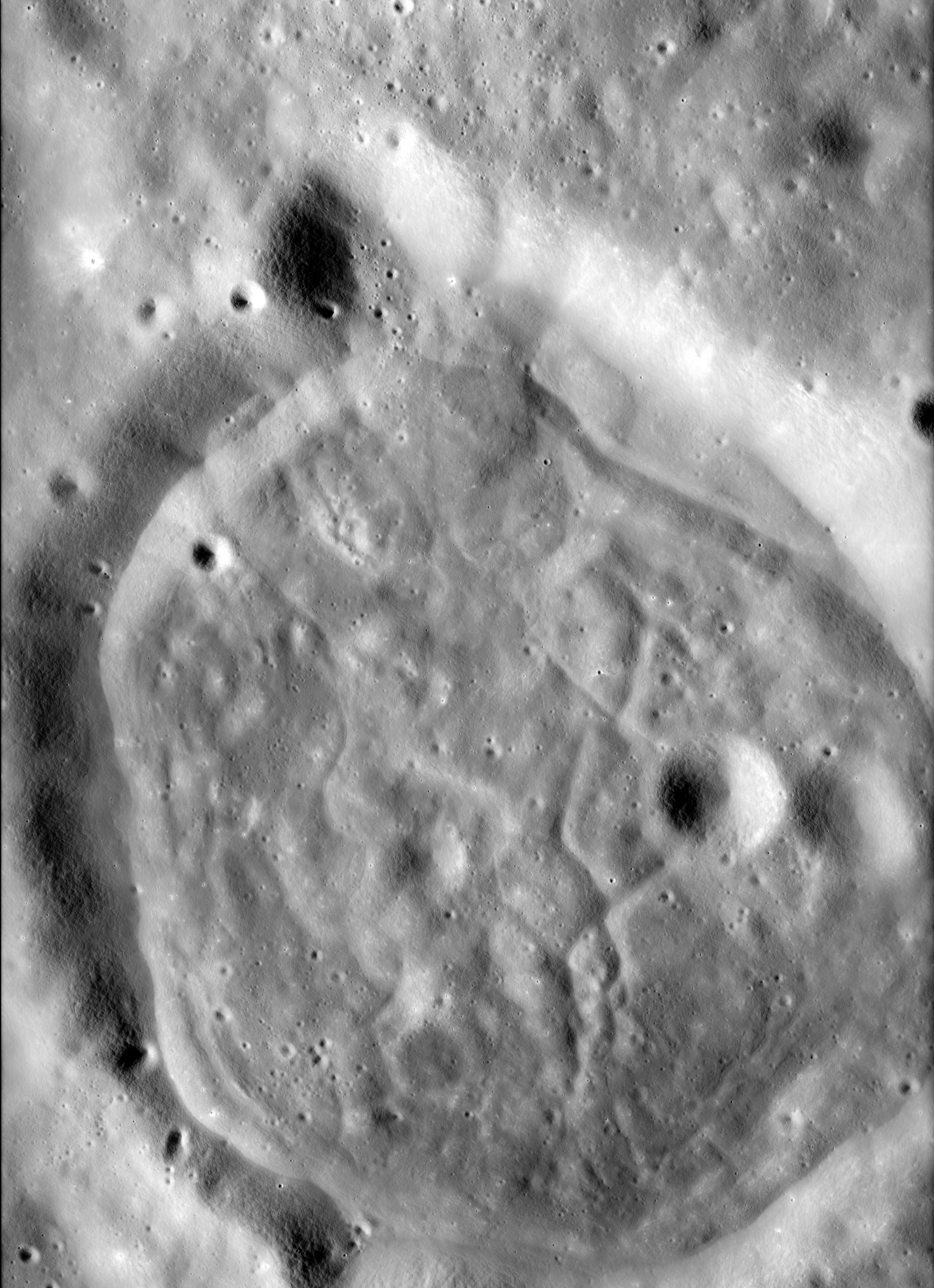
Zwicky N from Apollo 17 panoramic camera

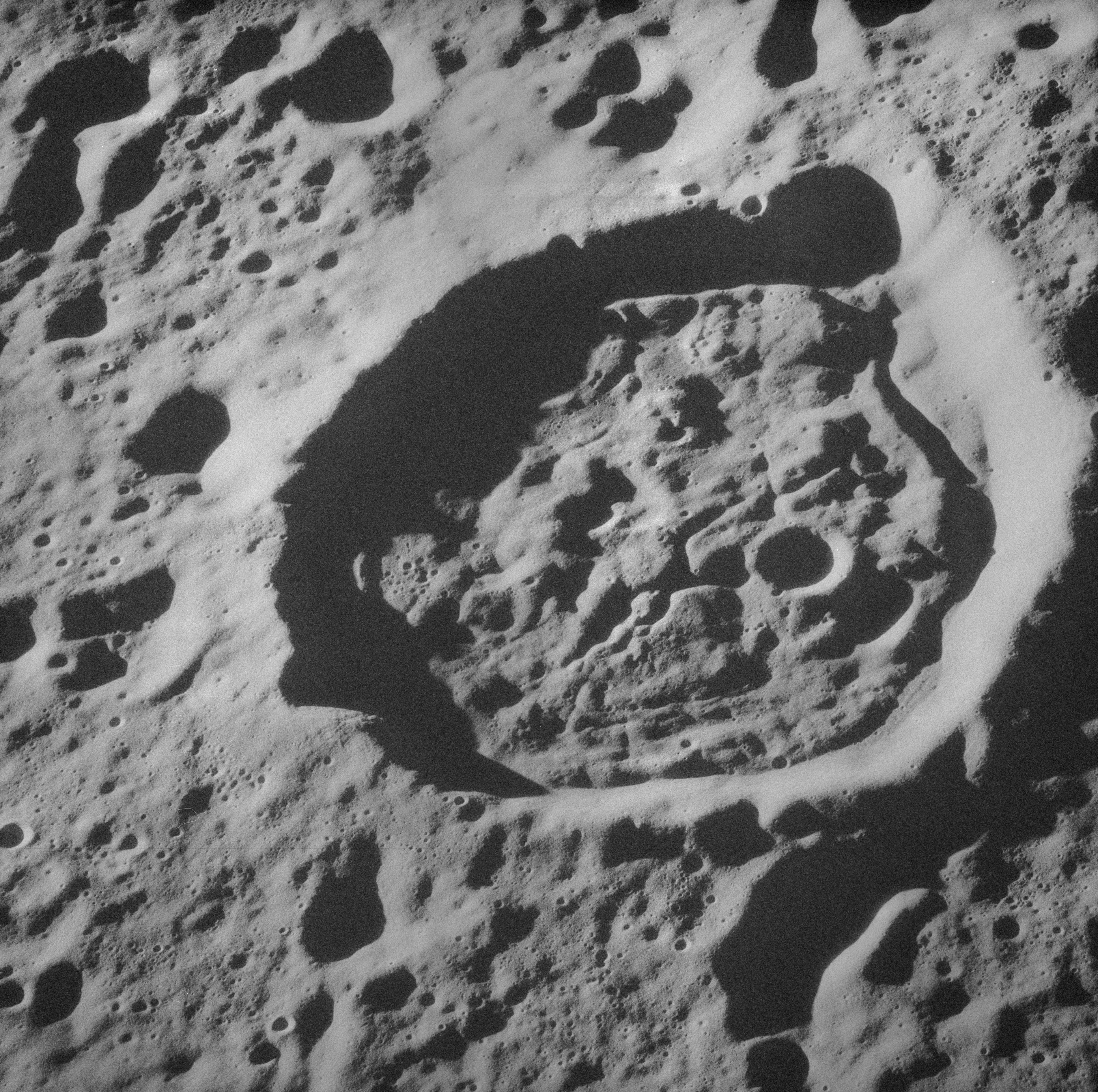
Another view of Zwicky N from Apollo 17
