= NGC 5753 =

Galaxy in the constellation Boötes

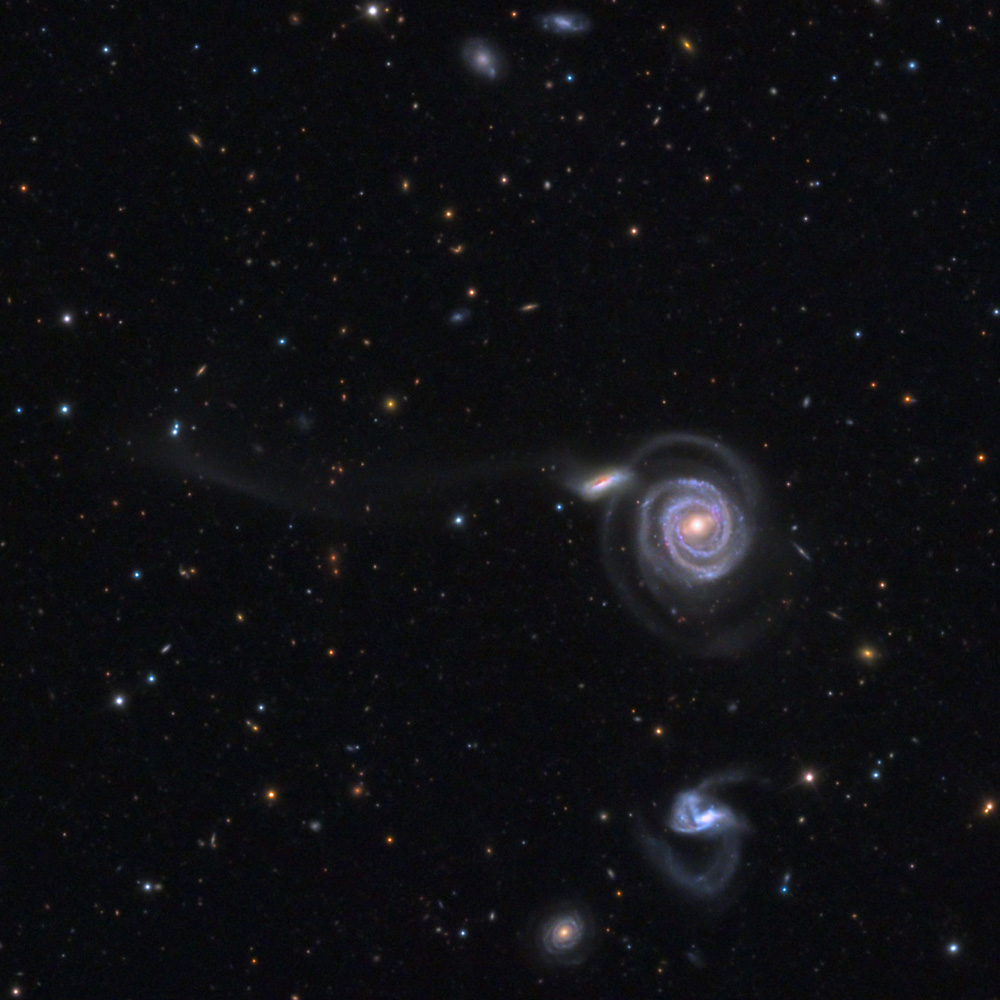
- NGC 5753 (bottom, just right of center), NGC 5755 (above, right) and NGC 5754 and NGC 5752

Observation data (J2000 epoch)
- Constellation: Boötes
- Right ascension: 14^{h} 45^{m} 18.875^{s}
- Declination: +38° 48′ 20.68″
- Redshift: 0.03210 ± 0.00014
- Distance: 427 Mly (130.8 Mpc)
- Apparent magnitude (V): 15.9

Characteristics
- Type: Sab
- Apparent size (V): 0.513′ × 0.431′
- Notable features: Paired with NGC 5755

Other designations
- 2MASX J14451887+3848206, CGCG 220.053, IRAS 14434+3859, MCG+07-30-062, NPM1G+39.0358, PGC 52695

NGC 5753 is a spiral galaxy in the constellation Boötes. This is a member of the Arp 297 interacting galaxies group of four: NGC 5752, NGC 5753, NGC 5754, NGC 5755.
