= Electra (supercomputer) =

NASA supercomputer

Design
- Manufacturer: Hewlett Packard Enterprise
- Release date: 2016

Casing
- Power: 1,685.73 KW

System
- Operating system: SUSE Linux Enterprise Server
- CPU: Intel Xeon Gold 6148
- Memory: 589,824 GB
- FLOPS: 8.32 petaflops

Electra is a petascale supercomputer located at the Ames Research Center facility, manufactured by Hewlett Packard Enterprise in 2016 and commissioned at 2017. This is the first modular supercomputer prototype designed by NASA, as part of its research on making supercomputing more efficient and environment-friendly. Its research resulted in the Aitken supercomputer, destined for Moon landing and related research.

Electra was in 12th place among the most powerful supercomputers in the United States, and 33rd place in the world, in the TOP500 list at November, 2018.

It has 2,304 HPE SGI 8600 and SGI ICE X nodes, each with a second generation Intel Xeon dual CPU, delivering up to 8.32 theoretical petaflops, and 5.44 petaflops (LINPACK) as of June 2019.
