= NGC 5754 =

Galaxy in the constellation Boötes

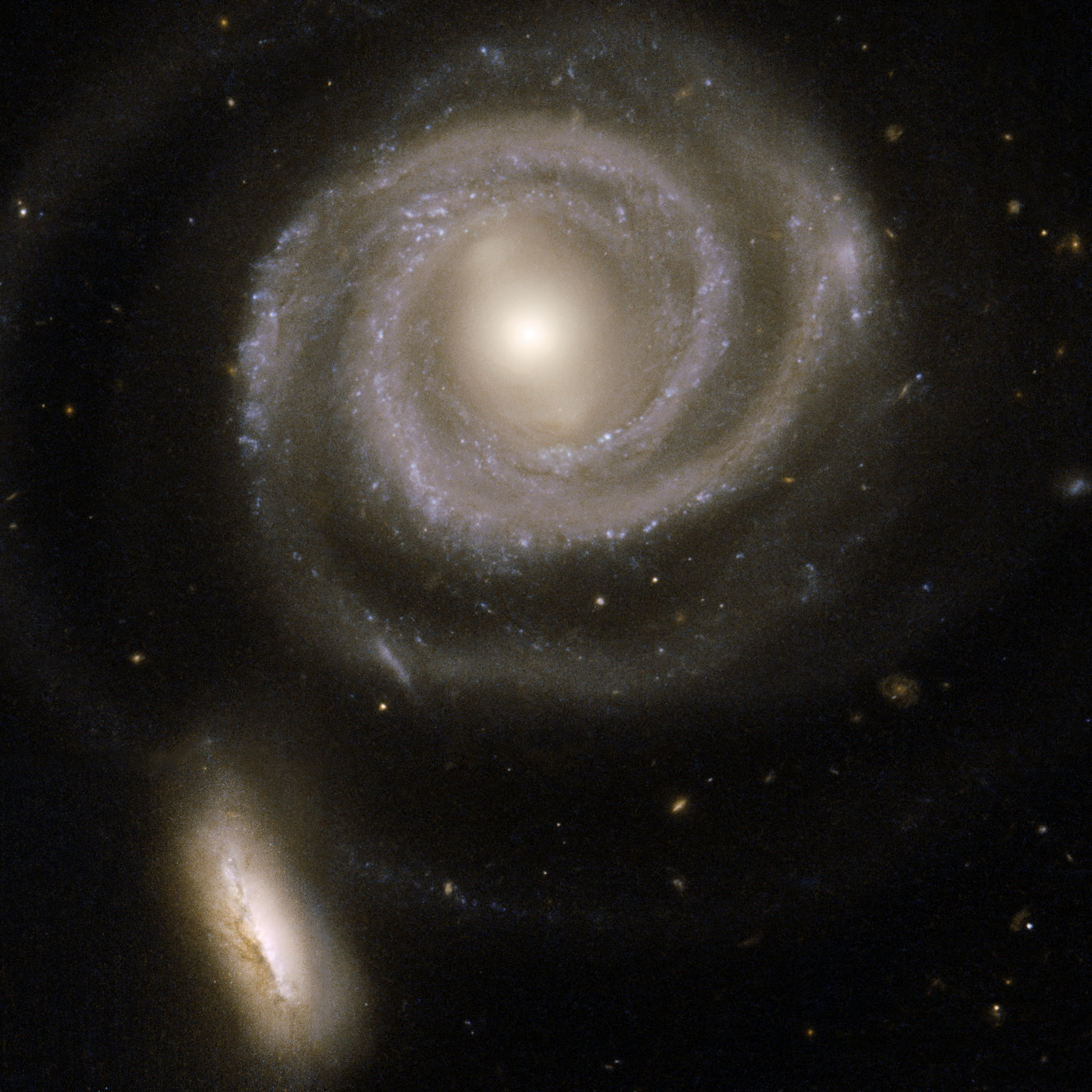
- NGC 5754 (top) and NGC 5752 (bottom left) imaged by the Hubble Space Telescope

Observation data (J2000 epoch)
- Constellation: Boötes
- Right ascension: 14^{h} 45^{m} 19.666^{s}
- Declination: +38° 43′ 52.68″
- Redshift: 0.015210
- Heliocentric radial velocity: 4,561 km/s
- Distance: 218.0 Mly (66.83 Mpc)
- Group or cluster: Arp 297
- Apparent magnitude (V): 13.8

Characteristics
- Type: SBb
- Size: 140,400 ly (43.07 kpc) (estimated)
- Apparent size (V): 1.24′ × 1.17′
- Notable features: paired with NGC 5752

Other designations
- UGC 9505, PGC 52686, SDSS J144519.64+384352.3

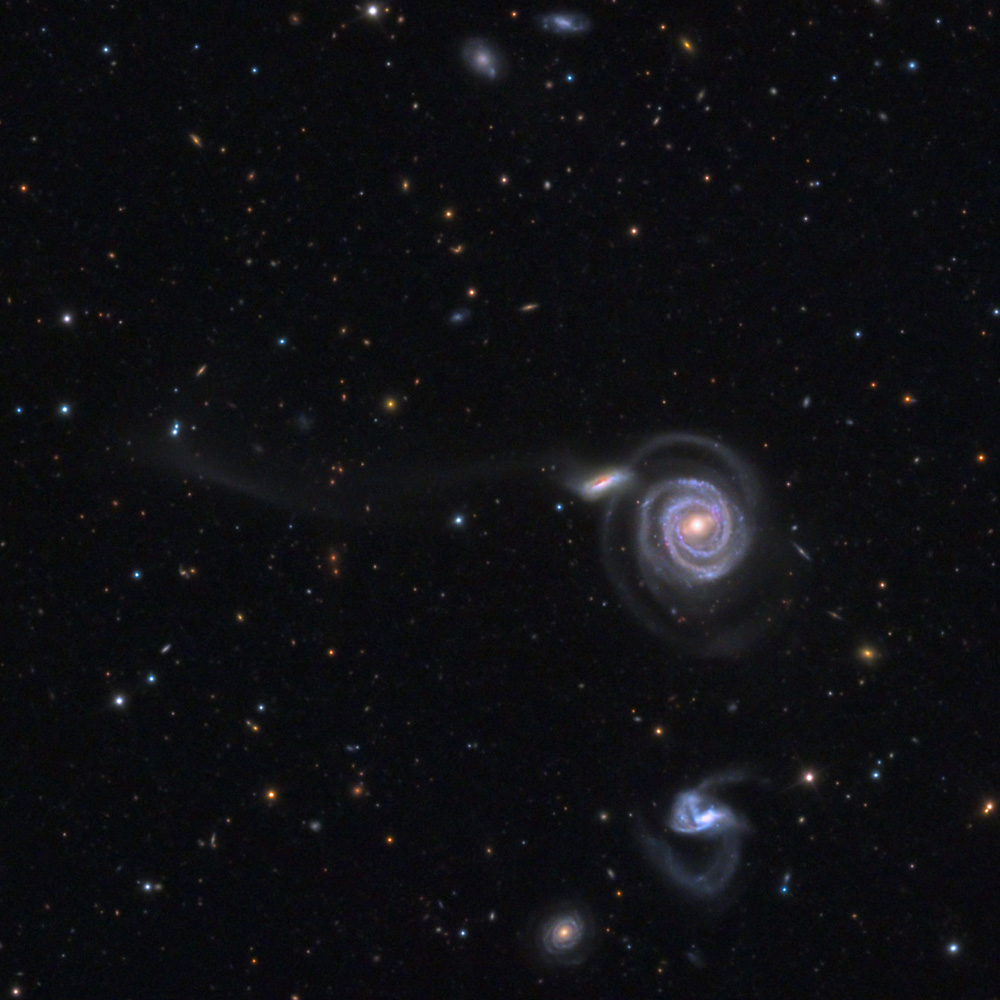
NGC 5754 and surrounding galaxies, Schulman Foundation 32 inch telescope on Mt. Lemmon, AZ, courtesy Adam Block

NGC 5754 is a barred spiral galaxy located 218 million light years away in the constellation Boötes. It was discovered by German-British astronomer William Herschel on 16 May 1787.

== Galaxy group ==
NGC 5754 is listed in the Atlas of Peculiar Galaxies as Arp 297, an interacting galaxies group, which consists of NGC 5752, NGC 5753, NGC 5754, NGC 5755. Along with NGC 2718 and UGC 12158, NGC 5754 is often considered a twin of the Milky Way.

== Supernova ==
One supernova has been observed in NGC 5754: SN 2021mnj (Type II, mag. 18.8) was discovered by the Zwicky Transient Facility on 15 May 2021.

== See also ==
- List of NGC objects (5001–6000)
- List of NGC objects
