= Marinus Vertregt =

Dutch astronomer (1897–1973)

Marinus Vertregt (April 19, 1897 – May 1, 1973) was a Dutch astronomer.

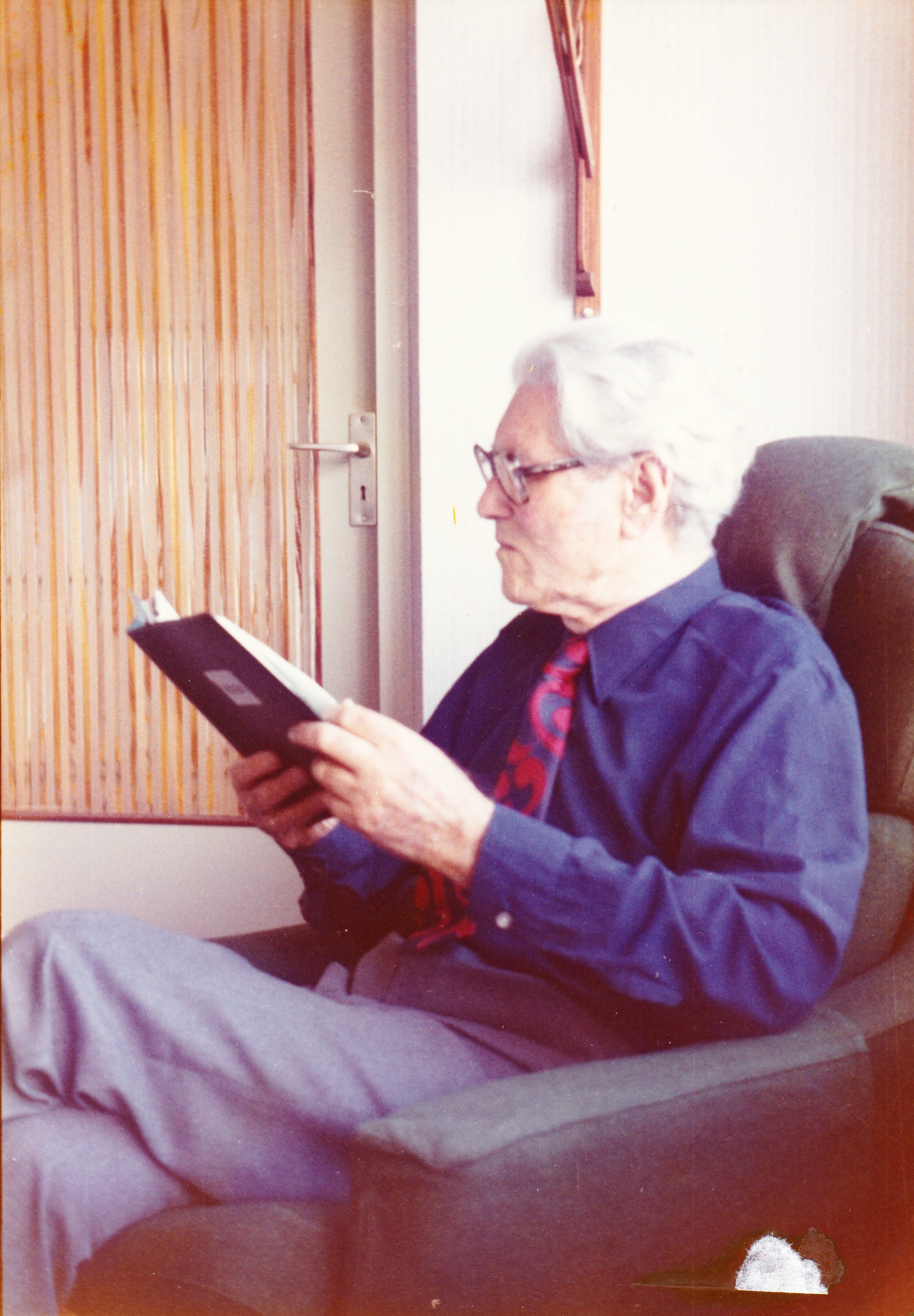
Marinus Vertregt reading in his home at Sliedrecht, Netherlands. Taken approximately 1972.

== Early life ==
Vertregt was born in Dordrecht, Netherlands. After elementary school he attended the Higher Technical school there and took a course in sugar technology.

In 1917 he departed for the Dutch East Indies (now called Indonesia) and was employed at several sugar factories of the Handels Vereeniging Amsterdam (H.V.A.) as a chemist, becoming a head chemist after three years.

Afterwards he was employed in the plantations of the same company's factories and became a director of the sugar estate of Minggiran in Java in 1935. In 1923 he married Hillegonda Hendrika van Donkelaar and in 1928 their daughter Angenita was born.

In 1943, during the Second World War, Vertregt, his wife and his daughter were put in a Japanese internment camp, until their liberation in 1945. During this time he was separated from his family as Japanese camps were segregated between men and women. In 1947 he returned to Indonesia to take on the job of director of the biggest sugar factory in Java, Djatiroto. In 1950 he retired on a pension and repatriated.

In 1951 he was asked by the H.V.A. to direct the founding of a sugar estate in Wonji, Ethiopia. After a year he was forced, to his regret, to retire owing to ill-health.

== Career in astronomy ==
Returning to Holland, Vertregt sought other employment and in 1952 became director of the newly founded Institute for Technical Courses, a sister organisation of the Bond voor Materialenkennis (Society for the Knowledge of Materials). Beginning with 25 pupils, the Institute flourished and after a few years it had 2,600 pupils.

From early youth Vertregt had been interested in astronomy and other sciences and soon after his repatriation he became interested in astronautics. In 1953 he became a member of the British Interplanetary Society (B.I.S.) and the Nederlandse Vereniging voor Ruimtevaart (Dutch Astronautical Society). In 1953 the American prof. dr. S.F. Singer released the idea of the Mouse (Minimum Orbital Unmanned Satellite Earth). Vertregt studied the design on request of the NVR. This lead in 1954 to a much improved design that was capable to circle the earth in a stable orbit for a year! The new design, called Muis (Dutch for Mouse) would be using a four-step rocket and would stay in an orbit at a height of 500 km. In 1958 he was appointed Fellow of the BIS on account of several original scientific articles in the Journal of the British Interplanetary Society . In 1959 his book Grondbeginselen van de Ruimtevaart appeared, followed in 1960 by an English translation: Principles of Astronautics and in 1965 in a much enlarged second edition. At the date of the first edition, this book was the first to treat the whole field of astronautics in a succinct though scientific manner. A Russian(!) edition was also issued. In 1961 he was invited to attend the First International Symposium on Analytical Astrodynamics, which was held at the University of California. After the symposium he held a lecture on Interplanetary Orbits for personnel of Douglas Aircraft. In 1964, after 12 years as director of the institute, he retired permanently.

In 1970 he was elected an Honorary Member of the Dutch Astronautical Society and in the same year an Honorary Member of the Bond voor Materialenkennis. He published many articles in the Journal of the B.I.S. and in the British periodical Spaceflight, as well as in Astronautica Acta and several Dutch periodicals. Furthermore, he read papers for several international Astronautical Congresses.

Through his education and career, Vertregt gained an incentive to take an interest in many sciences and arts. During his study at the Technical School at Dordrecht, where he learned mathematics, chemistry, physics and mechanical and chemical engineering, he studied Greek and Latin for himself in order to get a better understanding of the special features of these civilisations. From early youth he had learned English, French and German, and later in life he added Italian and Spanish. Moreover, from youth he had an absorbing interest in history and read widely in it and the history of art. In this manner he got a broad viewpoint on a vast terrain of human endeavour. Wanting to make this accumulated knowledge useful, he described the history of the civilisation of the countries of the Mediterranean and Western Europe in his book The Threefold Way. He also designed a Martian Calendar.

Marinus Vertregt died in 1973 at Sliedrecht, Netherlands. In 1979 a lunar crater was named after him on request of the Dutch Astronautical Society.

== Sources ==
- Gartmann, H. (1956), "Vlucht in de ruimte", translated from German by E. Franquinet, Amsterdam/Brussel, Elsevier.
- Article from Spaceflight about the Vertregt Martian calendar
