= Bergstrand (crater) =

Crater on the Moon

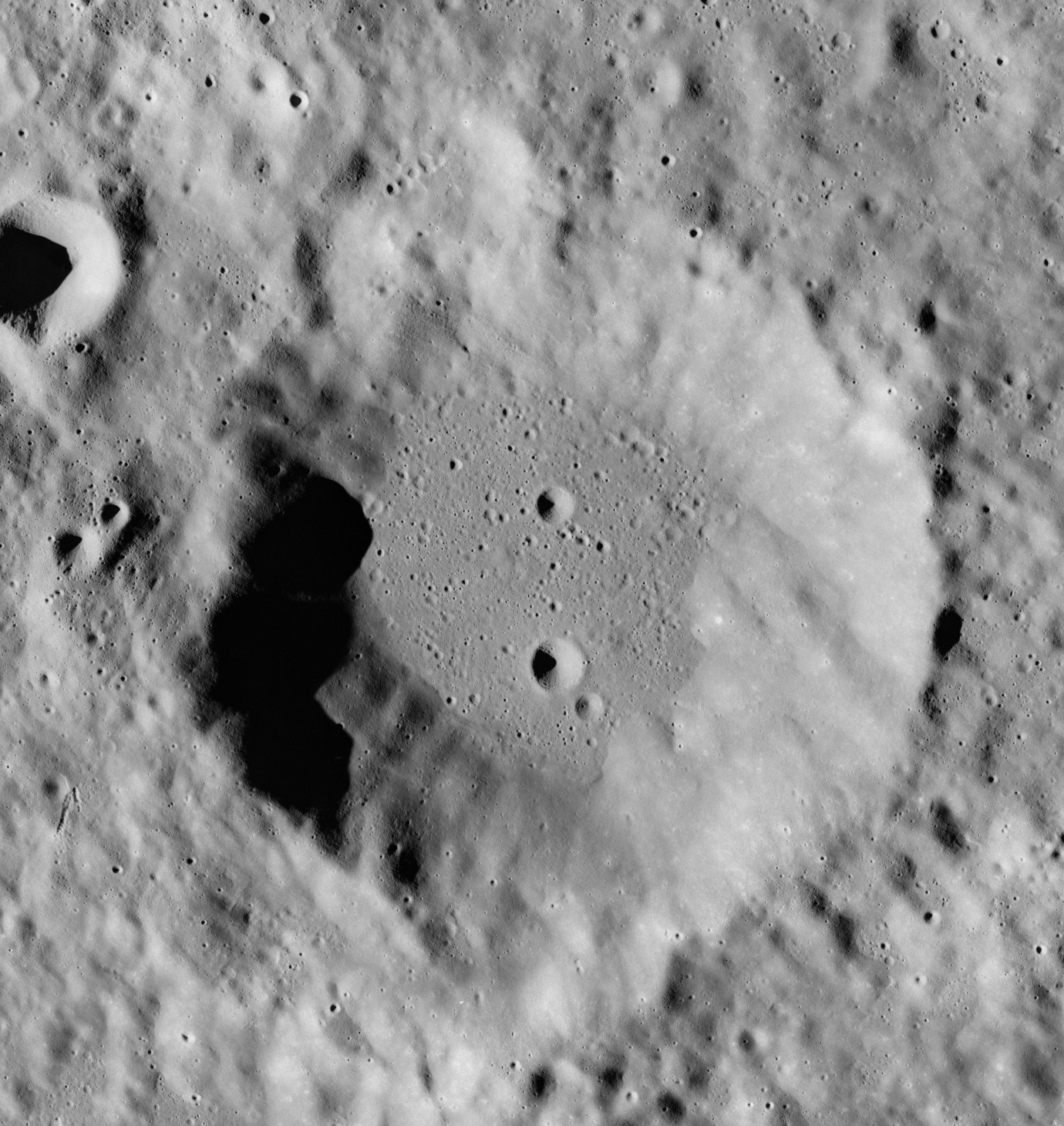
- Apollo 17 image
- Coordinates: 18.72°S 176.44°E
- Diameter: 42.98 km (26.71 mi)
- Depth: Unknown
- Colongitude: 184° at sunrise
- Eponym: Carl Ö. E. Bergstrand

Bergstrand is a lunar impact crater that lies on the far side of the Moon. It is located just to the southeast of the prominent crater Aitken, and northeast of the walled plain named Vertregt.

The rim of Bergstrand is roughly circular, except along the southwest where the larger satellite crater Bergstrand Q intrudes into the outer wall. Bergstrand's inner wall is somewhat worn, with no significant craterlets along the rim. There are a few small craterlets on the mostly flat interior floor.

This crater is named after Swedish astronomer Carl Ö. E. Bergstrand (1873–1948). Its designation was formally adopted by the International Astronomical Union in 1970.

== Satellite craters ==
By convention these features are identified on lunar maps by placing the letter on the side of the crater midpoint that is closest to Bergstrand.

Bergstrand	Coordinates	Diameter
G	19.86°S 179.28°E	32 km
J	20.23°S 178.03°E	28 km
Q	19.94°S 175.19°E	57 km
