= Robert Grant Aitken =

American astronomer

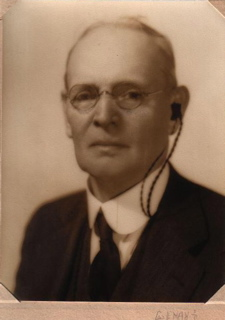
- Robert Grant Aitken (1864-1951)
- Born: December 31, 1864; Jackson, California, US
- Died: October 29, 1951 (aged 86); Berkeley, California, US
- Other name: R.G. Aitken
- Known for: Double stars
- Scientific career
- Fields: Astronomy
- Workplaces: University of California, Lick Observatory

Robert Grant Aitken (December 31, 1864 – October 29, 1951) was an American astronomer.

== Early life and education ==
Robert Grant Aitken was born in Jackson, California, to Scottish immigrant Robert Aitken and Wilhelmina Depinau, the daughter of German immigrants. Aitken attended Williams College in Massachusetts and graduated with an undergraduate degree in 1887.

== Career ==
From 1887–1891, he worked as a mathematics instructor at Livermore, California, then received his M.A. from Williams College in 1892. He became a professor of mathematics at the College of the Pacific, another liberal arts school. He was offered an assistant astronomer position at Lick Observatory in California in 1895.

He began a systematically study of double stars, measuring their positions and calculating their orbits around one another. From 1899, in collaboration with W. J. Hussey, he methodically created a very large catalog of such stars. This ongoing work was published in Lick Observatory bulletins. In 1905, Hussey left and Aitken pressed on with the survey alone, and by 1915, he had discovered roughly 3,100 new binary stars, in addition to the 1,300 discovered by Hussey. The results were published in 1932 and entitled New General Catalogue of Double Stars Within 120° of the North Pole, with the orbit information enabling astronomers to calculate stellar mass statistics for a large number of stars. For his work in cataloguing binary stars, he was awarded the prestigious Bruce Medal in 1926.

During his career, Aitken measured positions and computed orbits for comets and natural satellites of planets. In 1908 he joined an eclipse expedition to Flint Island in the central Pacific Ocean. His book Binary Stars was published in 1918, with a second edition published in 1935.

After joining the Astronomical Society of the Pacific in 1894, Aitken was elected to serve as president in 1899 and 1915 of the Astronomical Society of the Pacific. From 1898 to 1942, Aitken was an editor of the Publications of the Astronomical Society of the Pacific. In 1932, he delivered the Darwin Lecture before the Royal Astronomical Society, where he was an associate member. From 1918 to 1928, he was chair of the double star committee for the International Astronomical Union.

== Personal life ==
Aitken was partly deaf and used a hearing aid. He married Jessie Thomas around 1888; they had three sons and one daughter. Jessie died in 1943. Their son Robert Thomas Aitken was an anthropologist who studied Pacific island cultures. Their grandson, Robert Baker Aitken, was a widely known Zen Buddhist teacher and author. Their granddaughter Marjorie J. Vold was a noted chemist specializing in colloids.

== Honors ==
Awards and Honors

- Lalande Prize of the French Academy (1906, with William Hussey)
- Elected member of the United States National Academy of Sciences (1918)
- Elected member of the American Philosophical Society (1919)
- Bruce Medal (1926)
- Gold Medal of the Royal Astronomical Society (1932)
- Rittenhouse Medal (1934)
- Honorary Sc.D. from College of the Pacific, Williams College, University of Arizona, and an honorary LL.D. from the University of California

Named after him

- Minor planet 3070 Aitken
- Lunar crater Aitken, part of the very large South Pole-Aitken basin
- Aitken supercomputer at NASA Ames Research Center, Moffett Field, CA
