= 1803 Zwicky =

Main-belt asteroid binary

Discovery
- Discovered by: P. Wild
- Discovery site: Zimmerwald Obs.
- Discovery date: 6 February 1967

Designations
- Named after: Fritz Zwicky (Swiss astronomer)
- Alternative designations: 1967 CA · 1931 DL
- Minor planet category: main-belt · (inner); Phocaea

Orbital characteristics
- Epoch 17 December 2020 (JD 2459200.5)
- Uncertainty parameter 0
- Observation arc: 90.09 yr (32,907 d)
- Aphelion: 2.9312 AU
- Perihelion: 1.7685 AU
- Semi-major axis: 2.3498 AU
- Eccentricity: 0.2474
- Orbital period (sidereal): 3.60 yr (1,316 d)
- Mean anomaly: 284.97°
- Mean motion: 0° 16^{m} 24.96^{s} / day
- Inclination: 21.553°
- Longitude of ascending node: 337.24°
- Argument of perihelion: 253.96°
- Known satellites: 1 (0.26D_{s}/D_{p}; P: 28.5 h)

Physical characteristics
- Mean diameter: 9.20±0.24 km; 9.934±0.080 km; (Prim.: 9.61±0.08 km); (Sec.: 2.50±0.19 km)
- Synodic rotation period: 2.73364±0.00005 h
- Geometric albedo: 0.259±0.038; 0.337
- Spectral type: S
- Absolute magnitude (H): 12.23; 12.24

1803 Zwicky, prov. designation: 1967 CA, is a stony Phocaea asteroid and binary system from the inner regions of the asteroid belt, approximately 10 kilometers (6.2 miles) in diameter. It was discovered on 6 February 1967, by Swiss astronomer Paul Wild at Zimmerwald Observatory near Bern, Switzerland. It was later named after Swiss astronomer Fritz Zwicky. The discovery of a 2.5-kilometer sized companion was announced on 8 March 2021.

== Classification and orbit ==
Zwicky is a member of the Phocaea family (701), an asteroid family with two thousand members, named after their largest member, 25 Phocaea. It orbits the Sun in the inner main-belt at a distance of 1.8–2.9 AU once every 3 years and 7 months (1,316 days; semi-major axis of 2.35 AU). Its orbit has an eccentricity of 0.25 and an inclination of 22° with respect to the ecliptic. It was first identified as 1931 DL at Lowell Observatory in 1931, extending the body's observation arc by 36 years prior to its official discovery observation.

== Naming ==
This minor planet was named after Swiss astronomer Fritz Zwicky (1898–1974), who was a professor at Caltech and a pioneer in many fields, most notably in the study of galaxy clusters and supernovas, in high-energy astrophysics, and in developing jet propulsion for spacecraft and airplanes. He was the first to infer the existence of unseen matter and coined the term dark matter. The lunar crater Zwicky is also named in his honour. The official naming citation was published by the Minor Planet Center on 18 April 1977 (M.P.C. 4156).

== Physical characteristics ==
Zwicky is a bright, stony S-type asteroid, in line with the overall spectral type for members of the Phocaea family.

=== Lightcurves ===
In July 2018, a rotational lightcurve of Zwicky was obtained from photometric observations by the TESS-team which gave a rotation period of (2.73364±0.00005) hours and an amplitude of (0.06±0.01) magnitude (U=2). Observations by Tom Polakis, who also discovered a satellite, determined a very similar period of (2.7329±0.0002) hours with a brightness variation of (0.105±0.035) (U=2). These more recent result are replacing a previous observation from March 2003, of a fragmentary lightcurve by French amateur astronomer Laurent Bernasconi that gave a tentative period of 27.1 hours and an amplitude of 0.08 (U=1).

=== Diameter and albedo ===
According to the surveys carried out by the Japanese Akari satellite and NASA's Wide-field Infrared Survey Explorer with its subsequent NEOWISE mission, Zwicky measures between 9.20±0.24 and 9.934±0.080 kilometers in diameter, and its surface has an albedo of 0.337 and 0.259±0.038, respectively. The Collaborative Asteroid Lightcurve Link assumes a standard albedo for Phocaea asteroids of 0.23, and calculates a diameter of 10.06 kilometers based on an absolute magnitude of 12.2. The WISE team also published an alternative mean-diameters of (8.03±1.37) and (10.229±0.082) kilometers with a corresponding albedo of (0.35) and (0.2466).

=== Satellite ===
Photometric observations at the Command Module Observatory (V02) by Tom Polakis on 21 February 2021 revealed that Zwicky has a satellite in its orbit. The moon has a diameter of approximately 2.50 kilometers, or 26% of that of its primary, and an orbital period of 28.46 hours.
