= Aitken (crater) =

Lunar impact crater

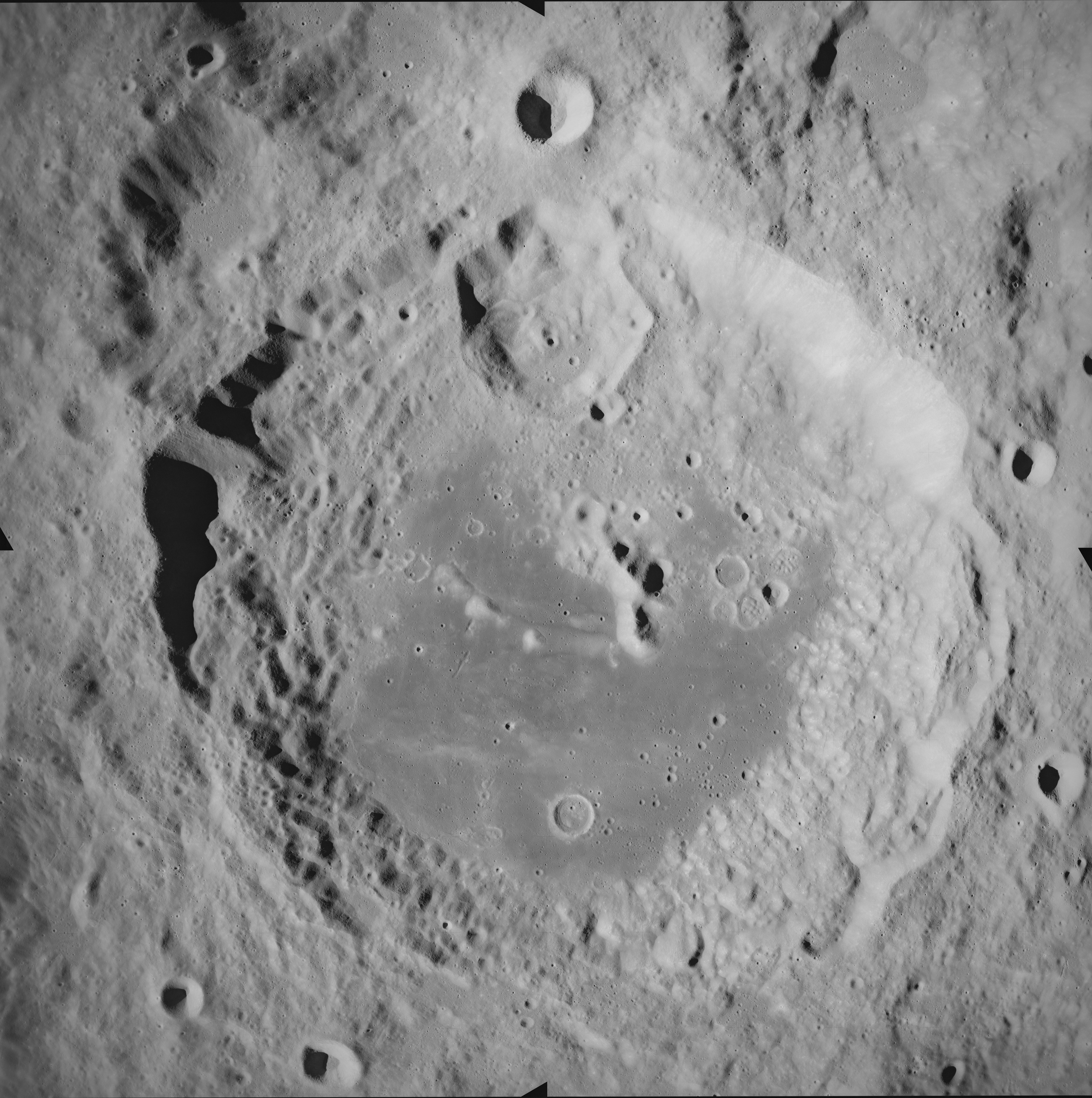
- Aitken view by Apollo 17 from 121 km altitude
- Coordinates: 16.44°S 172.96°E
- Diameter: 129.69 km (80.59 mi)
- Depth: 6 km (3.7 mi)
- Colongitude: 187° at sunrise
- Formation: Late Imbrian
- Eponym: Robert Aitken

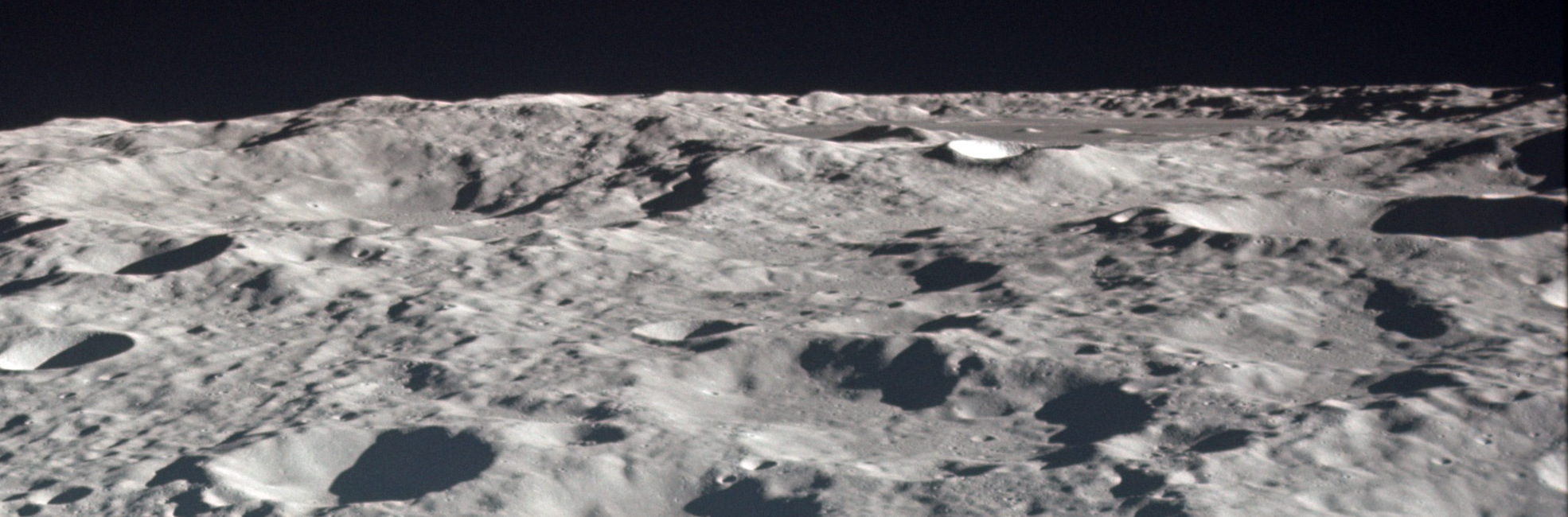
Oblique view of Aitken (upper right, on the horizon), from Apollo 11. Aitken A is on the rim of Aitken, Atiken C is at left, and Aitken Y is at right, in front of Aitken.

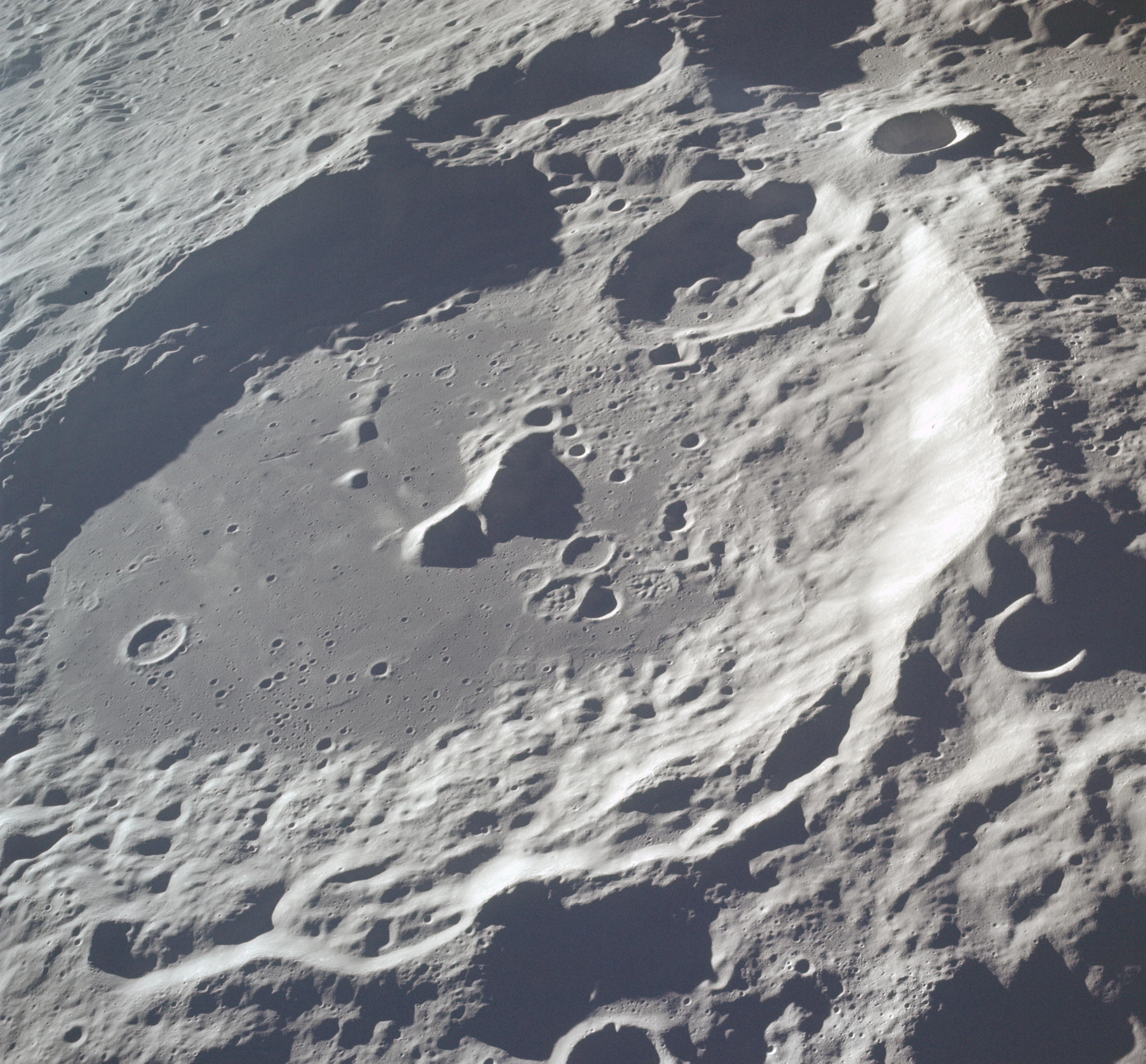
Oblique view, also from Apollo 17

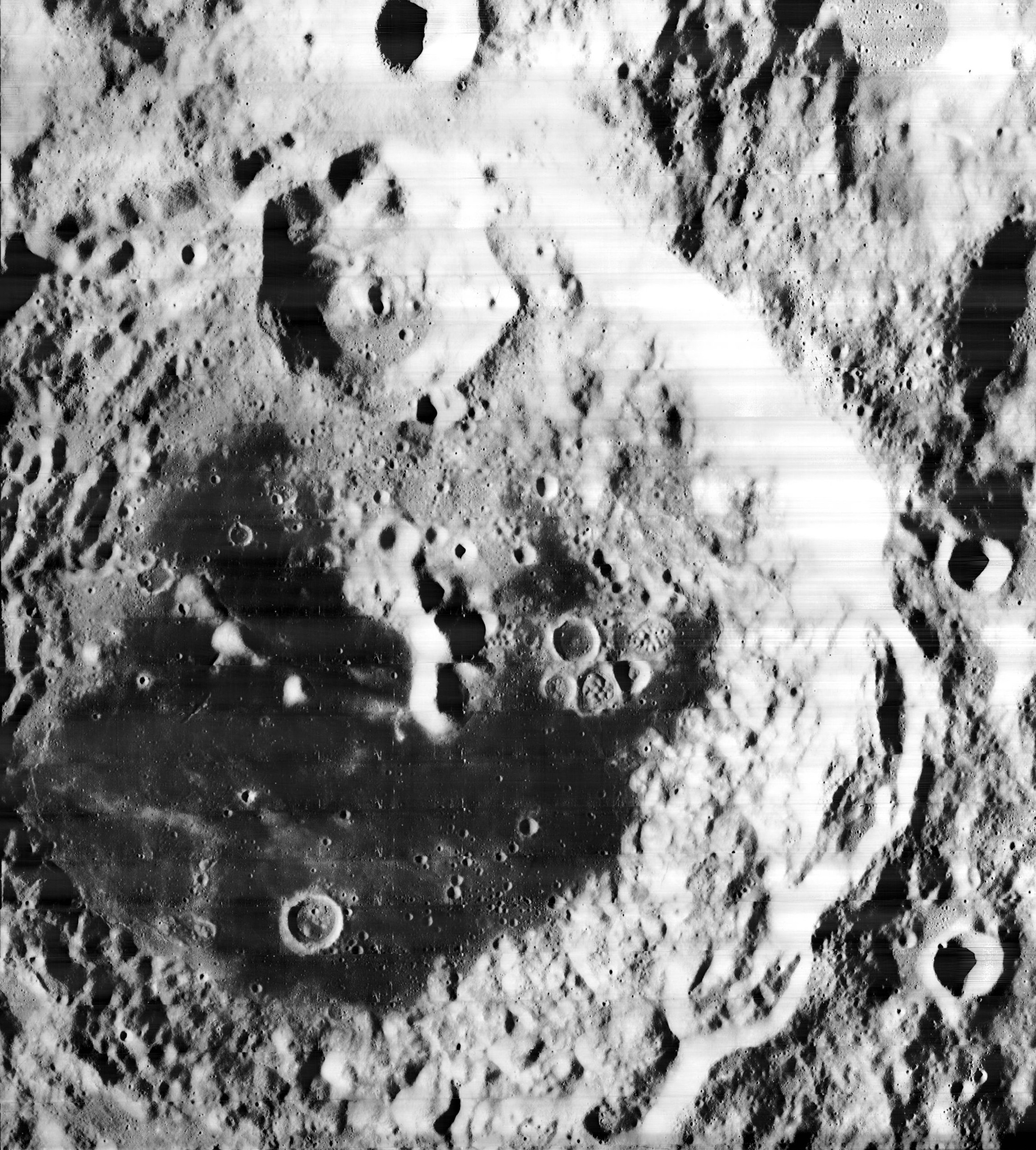
Lunar Orbiter 2 image of most of Aitken

Aitken /ˈeɪtkɪn/ is a large lunar impact crater that lies on the far side of the Moon. It lies along the northern rim of the immense South Pole–Aitken basin (SPA), which was named after this crater and the southern lunar pole, two extreme points of the formation. Aitken is located to the southeast of the crater Heaviside, and north of the unusual formation Van de Graaff. Attached to the southwest rim is Vertregt. To the southeast is the smaller Bergstrand.

This formation dates to the Late Imbrian epoch of the lunar geologic timescale. It is quite deep because the impactor struck broken and porous ejecta from the SPA. The inner wall of Aitken is terraced and varies notably in width with the narrowest portion in the southwest. The crater Aitken Z lies across the inner north wall. Just to the north of the rim is the small crater Aitken which is surrounded by an ejecta blanket of lighter-albedo material.

The interior floor has been resurfaced in the past by a darker lava flow, especially in the southern half. There are also several small crater impacts on the eastern floor, an arcing central ridge line just to the east of the midpoint, and a line of smaller ridges in the western half. Anorthosite with a very low mafic abundance has been detected in the central peaks.

The crater is named after American astronomer Robert Aitken (1864–1951), a specialist in binary stellar systems. This designation was adopted by the International Astronomical Union in 1970. Aitken was known as Crater 307 prior to naming.

Aitken was a target of observation on Apollo 17 due to the command module's orbit passing directly over it. The crew had a photograph of Aitken from Zond 8 with instructions to examine the interior of the crater with emphasis on albedo, textures, and structures of the dark floor fill, the nature of light swirls in the southwest quadrant of the floor, and structures and rock exposures on the central peak, and possible "lava marks."

== Satellite craters ==
By convention, these features are identified on Lunar maps by placing the letter on the side of the crater midpoint that is closest to Aitken.

Aitken	Latitude	Longitude	Diameter
A	14.0° S	173.7° E	13 km
C	14.0° S	175.8° E	74 km
G	16.8° S	174.2° E	7 km
N	17.7° S	172.7° E	7 km
Y	12.0° S	173.2° E	35 km
Z	15.1° S	173.3° E	33 km

Aitken Y and Daedalus R display striations caused by ejecta from the formation of Aitken.

== See also ==
- 3070 Aitken, minor planet
- South Pole-Aitken Basin
