= Östen Bergstrand =

Swedish astronomer (1873–1948)

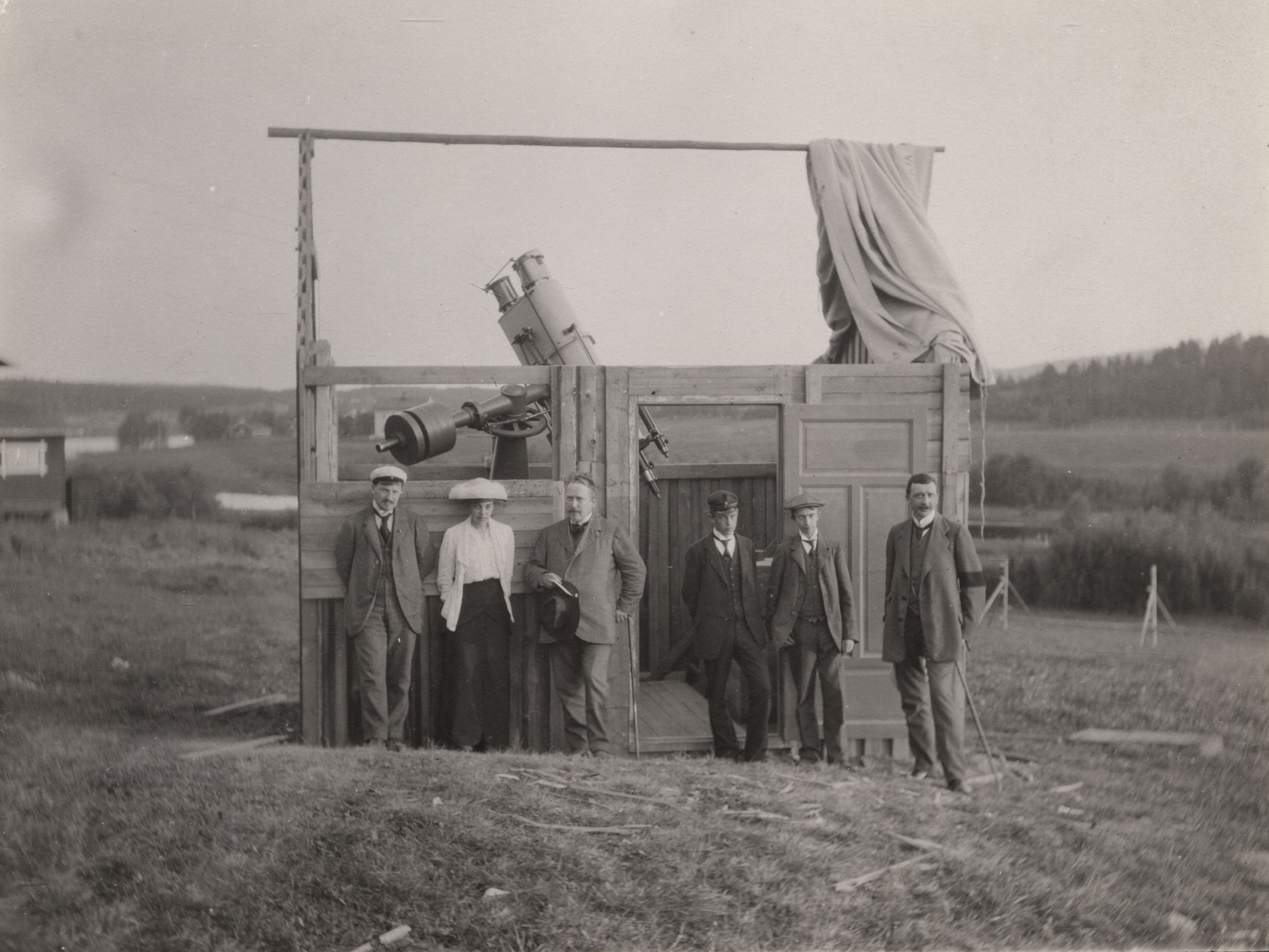
Left to right: Knut Lundmark, Andrea Lindstedt, Östen Bergstrand, two unknown men, and Nils Tamm, August 1914

Carl Östen Emanuel Bergstrand (1 September 1873 – 27 September 1948) was a Swedish astronomer.

He was Professor of Astronomy at Uppsala University from 1909 until 1938 and from where he received his Ph.D. in astronomy in 1899 under Nils Christoffer Dunér. His early work was focused on astrometrics, particularly in the examination of photographic plates to measure stellar parallax. He used the orbital motions of the moons of Uranus to measure the rotation period and equatorial flattening of the planet. He also made studies of the solar corona, using photographs from the 1914 solar eclipse expedition.

He wrote works on astronomy for the general public, including Astronomi (1925).

The crater Bergstrand on the Moon is named after him.
