= Vertregt (crater) =

Crater on the Moon

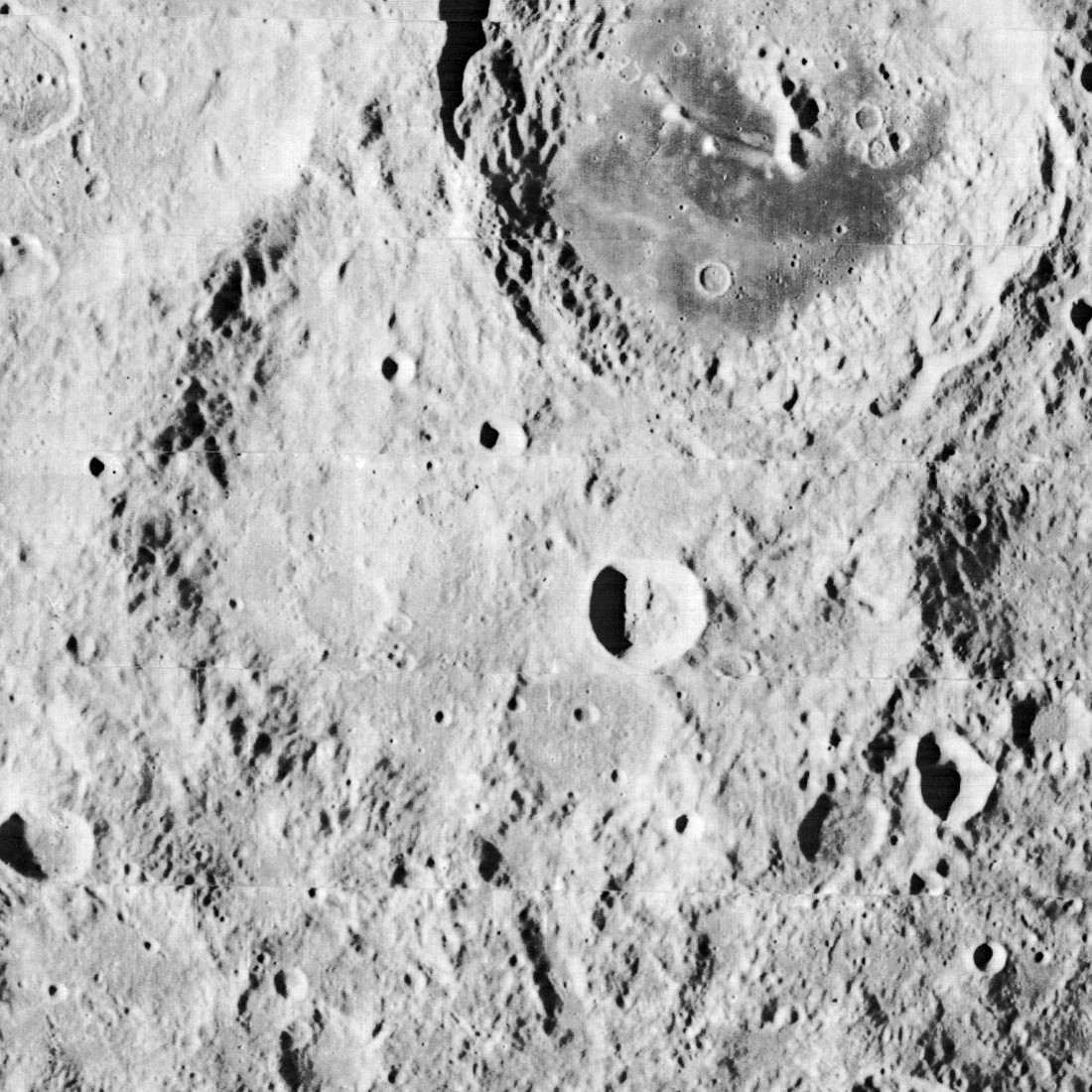
- Lunar Orbiter 2 image
- Coordinates: 19.30°S 171.12°E
- Diameter: 172.76 km (107.35 mi)
- Depth: Unknown
- Colongitude: 189° at sunrise
- Eponym: Marinus Vertregt

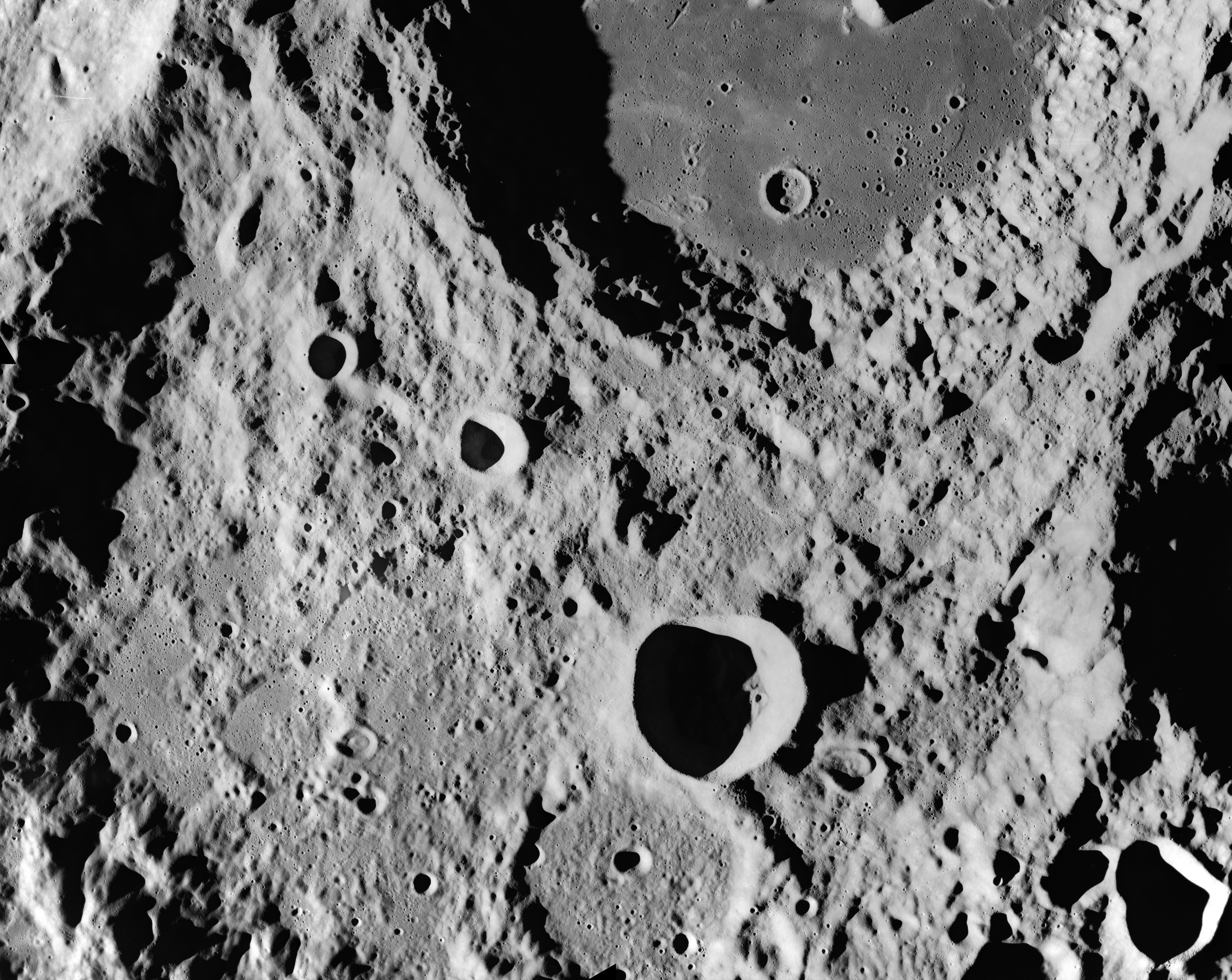
Image from Apollo 17 at low sun angle

Vertregt is the ancient remnant of a large lunar impact crater. It is located on the far side of the Moon, to the north of an unusual walled plain called Van de Graaff. The prominent crater Aitken lies across the northeast rim of Vertregt, and Zwicky is attached to the northwestern rim.

Vertregt has been heavily eroded and reshaped by subsequent events, leaving only a few segments of the outer rim still visible. The northwestern section of the rim is the most intact portion, although even this arcing ridge is marked by small craterlets.

The interior consists of rugged ridges and smaller impacts, most prominently the crater pair of Vertregt L and Vertregt K in the southeast. There is a wide rift leading from the southern end of the crater floor towards Van de Graaff.

Vertregt was named by the IAU in 1979 after Dutch chemist Marinus Vertregt. Vertregt was known as Crater 369 prior to naming.

== Satellite craters ==
By convention these features are identified on lunar maps by placing the letter on the side of the crater midpoint that is closest to Vertregt.

Vertregt	Latitude	Longitude	Diameter
J	21.5° S	174.3° E	17 km
K	20.1° S	172.0° E	27 km
L	21.1° S	171.5° E	38 km
P	23.6° S	170.0° E	24 km
R	21.8° S	167.1° E	25 km
