= Aitken (supercomputer) =

NASA supercomputer

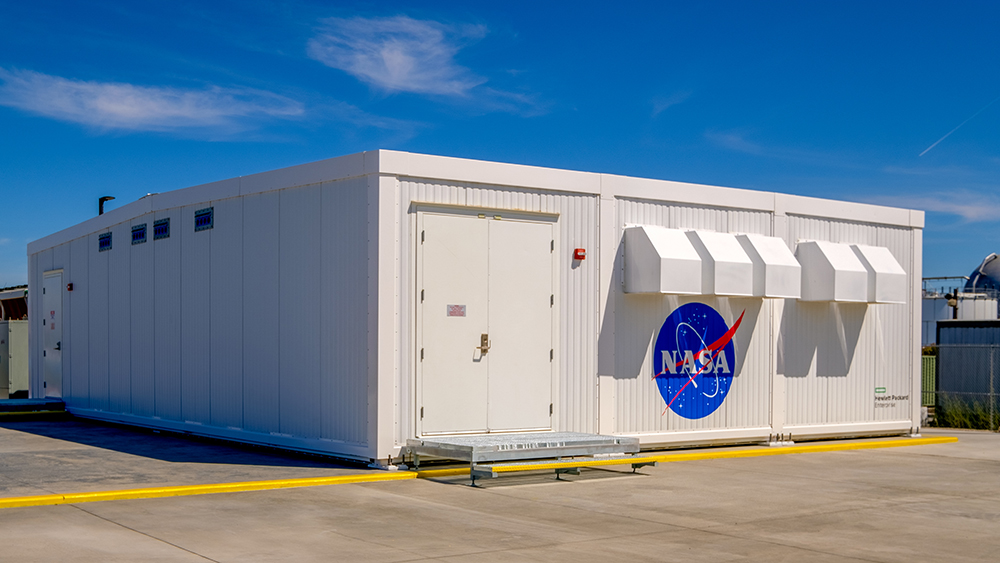
- Aitken supercomputer shed

Design
- Manufacturer: Hewlett Packard Enterprise
- Release date: 2019

System
- Operating system: SUSE Linux Enterprise Server
- CPU: Intel Xeon Gold 6248
- Memory: 192 GB per node
- Storage: 221 TB
- FLOPS: 3.69 petaflops

The Aitken is a petascale supercomputer installed at the Ames Research Center facility, manufactured by Hewlett Packard Enterprise. It initially consisted of 1,150 HPE SGI 8600 nodes, with an estimated performance of 3.69 petaflops.

It is based on the supercomputer prototype Electra, where more efficient cooling methods were sought, being energy saving over performance is one of its features.

Aitken is intended for lunar landing and related research, as part of the plans for sending people to the Moon.
