= Fritz Zwicky =

Swiss astronomer (1898–1974)

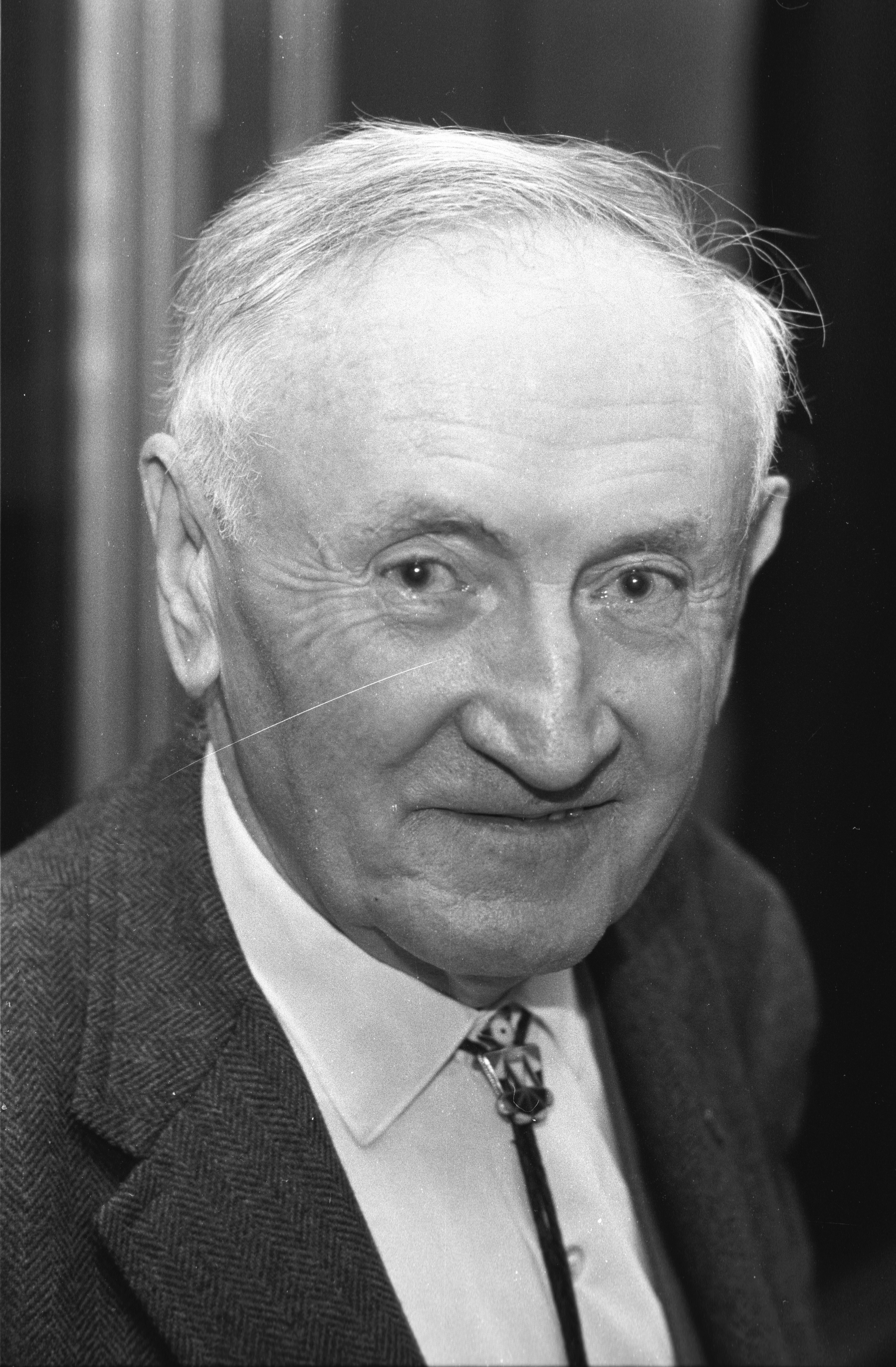
- Zwicky in c. 1970
- Born: February 14, 1898; Varna, Bulgaria
- Died: February 8, 1974 (aged 75); Pasadena, California, US
- Citizenship: Swiss
- Education: Swiss Federal Polytechnic
- Known for: Dark matter, supernovae, galaxies as gravitational lenses, neutron stars
- Awards: Medal of Freedom (1949); Gold Medal of the Royal Astronomical Society (1972)
- Scientific career
- Fields: Astronomy
- Workplaces: California Institute of Technology
- Doctoral advisor: Peter Debye and Paul Scherrer

Fritz Zwicky (/ˈtsvɪki/; German: [ˈtsvɪki]; February 14, 1898 – February 8, 1974) was a Swiss astronomer. He worked most of his life at the California Institute of Technology in the United States of America, where he made many important contributions in theoretical and observational astronomy. He was the first to propose supernovas as giant explosions at the end of a star's life, and neutron stars as the remnants left over after supernovas. In 1933, Zwicky proposed that unseen dark matter would explain the much higher mass required to explain velocity dispersion in the Coma Cluster, compared to mass calculated from luminosity data.

== Biography ==
Fritz Zwicky was born in Varna, Bulgaria, to a Swiss father (citizenship in Mollis, Glarus) and Czech mother. His father, Fridolin (b. 1868), was a prominent industrialist in the Bulgarian city and also served as Norwegian consul in Varna (1908–1933). Fridolin Zwicky designed and built his family's Zwicky House in Varna. Fritz's mother, Franziska Vrček (b. 1871), was an ethnic Czech of the Austro-Hungarian Empire. Fritz was the oldest of three children: he had a brother named Rudolf and a sister, Leonie. Fritz's mother died in Varna in 1927. His father lived and worked in Bulgaria until 1945, and returned to Switzerland after World War II. Fritz's sister Leonie married a Bulgarian from Varna and spent her entire life in the city.

In 1904, at the age of six, Fritz was sent to his paternal grandparents in Glarus, Switzerland, to study commerce. His interests shifted to mathematics and physics. He received an advanced education in mathematics and experimental physics at the Swiss Federal Polytechnic (today known as ETH Zurich) in Zürich. He finished his studies there in 1922 with a Dr. sc. nat. degree (PhD equivalent) with a thesis entitled Zur Theorie der heteropolaren Kristalle (On the theory of heteropolar crystals).

In 1925, Zwicky emigrated to the United States to work with Robert Millikan at California Institute of Technology (Caltech) after receiving the Rockefeller Foundation fellowship. He had an office down the hall from Robert Oppenheimer.

Zwicky developed numerous cosmological theories that have had a profound influence on the understanding of our universe in the early 21st century. He coined the term "supernova" while fostering the concept of neutron stars. Five years passed before Oppenheimer published his landmark paper announcing "neutron stars".

Zwicky was appointed Professor of Astronomy at Caltech in 1942. He also worked as a research director/consultant for Aerojet Engineering Corporation (1943–1961), and as a staff member of Mount Wilson Observatory and Palomar Observatory for most of his career. He developed some of the earliest jet engines and holds more than 50 patents, many in jet propulsion. He invented the Underwater Jet. An example of his WWII rocket propulsion work would be a patent on a nitromethane engine filed by a collective of Zwicky and three other Aerojet employees in March 1944, and he also published an article on chemical kinetics in rocket engines and motors in 1950.

== Personal life ==
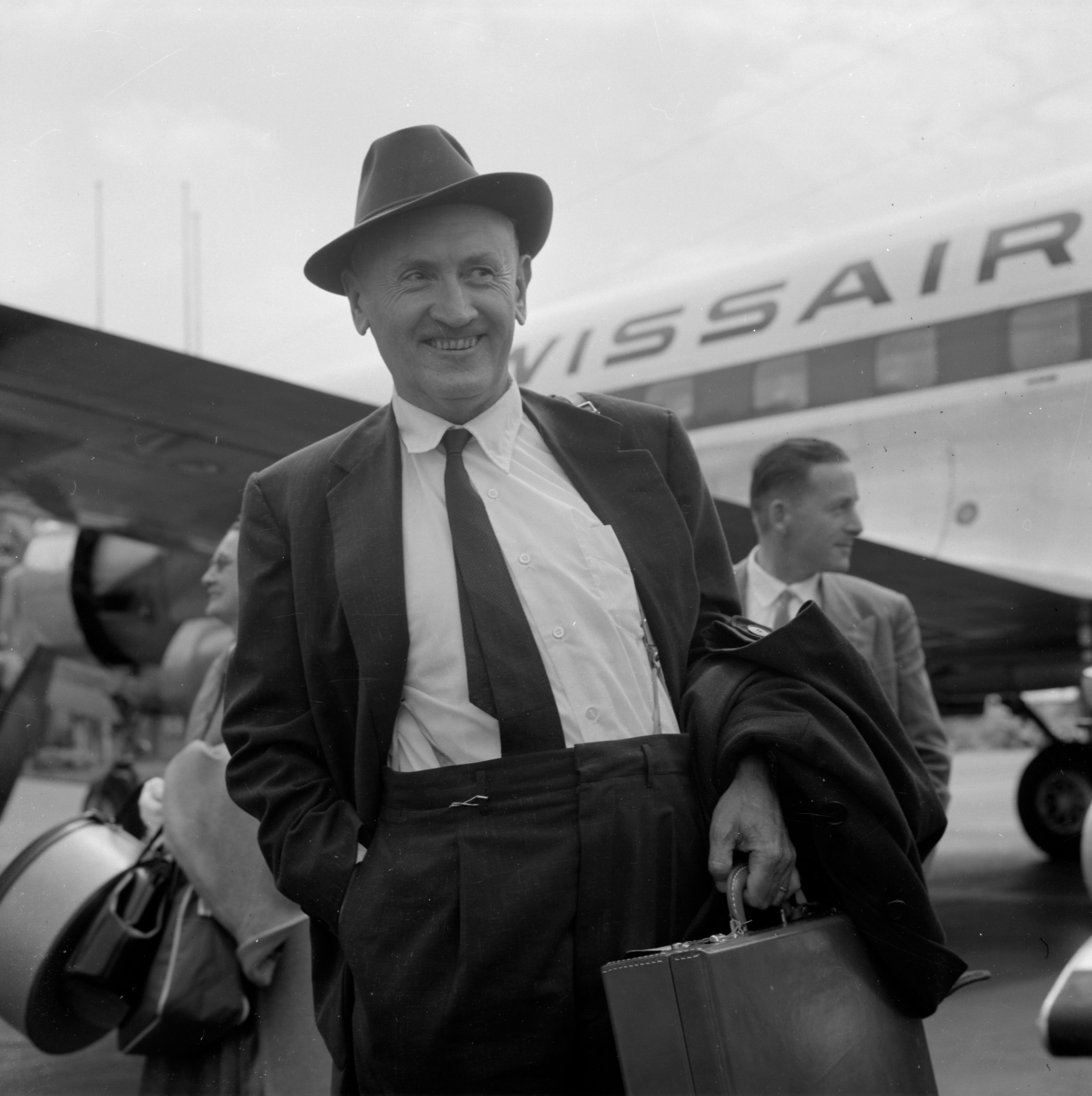
Zwicky in c. 1960

On 25 March 1932, Fritz Zwicky married Dorothy Vernon Gates (1904–1991), a member of a prominent local family and a daughter of California State Senator Egbert James Gates. Her money was instrumental in the funding of the Palomar Observatory during the Great Depression. Nicholas Roosevelt, cousin of President Theodore Roosevelt, was his brother-in-law by marriage to Tirzah Gates. Zwicky and Dorothy divorced amicably in 1941.

On 18 October 1947, Zwicky married Anna Margaritha Zürcher (1929–2012) in Switzerland. They had three daughters together, Margrit, Franziska, and Barbarina. The Zwicky Museum at the Landesbibliothek, Glarus, houses many of his papers and scientific works. Zwicky died of a heart attack in Pasadena, California on February 8, 1974, and was buried in Mollis, Switzerland.

Zwicky was critical of religion and considered it unacceptable to attribute natural phenomena to God.

He is remembered as both a genius and a curmudgeon. One of his favorite insults was to refer to people whom he did not like as "spherical bastards", because, as he explained, they were bastards no matter which way one looked at them.

== Legacy ==
The Fritz Zwicky Stiftung (Foundation) was established in Switzerland to carry on his ideas relating to "Morphological analysis". The foundation published a biography of Zwicky in English: Alfred Stöckli & Roland Müller: Fritz Zwicky – An Extraordinary Astrophysicist. Cambridge: Cambridge Scientific Publishers, 2011.

== Scientific work ==
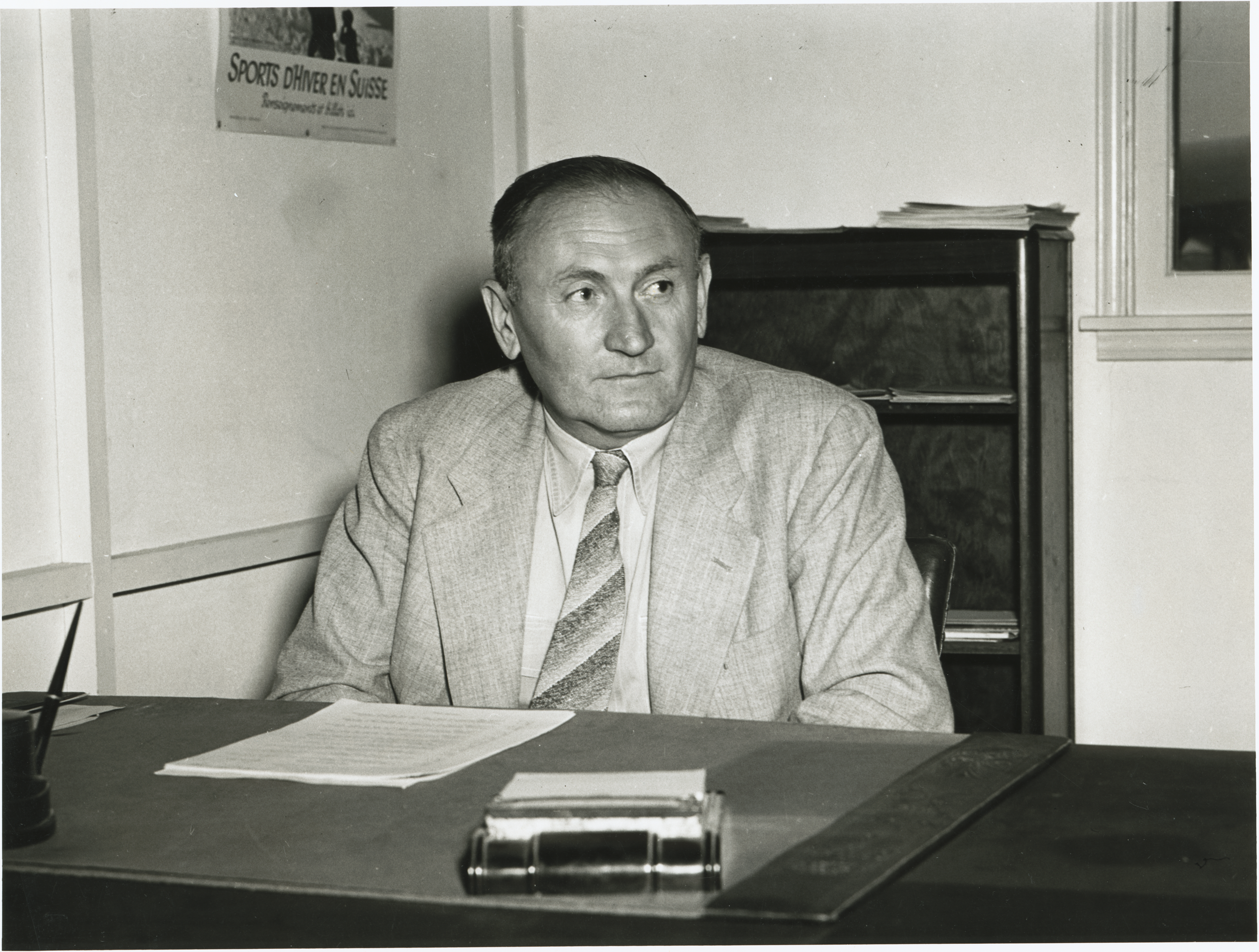
Zwicky in 1947

Fritz Zwicky was a prolific scientist and made important contributions in many areas of astronomy.

=== Ionic crystals and electrolytes ===
His first scientific contributions pertained to ionic crystals and electrolytes.

=== Supernovae and neutron stars ===
Together with colleague Walter Baade, Zwicky pioneered and promoted the use of the first Schmidt telescopes used in a mountain-top observatory in 1935. In 1934 he and Baade coined the term "supernova" and hypothesized that supernovae were the transition of normal stars into neutron stars, as well as the origin of cosmic rays. This was an opinion which contributed to determining the size and age of the universe subsequently.

In support of this hypothesis, Zwicky started looking for supernovae, and found a total of 120 by himself (and one more, SN 1963J, in concert with Paul Wild) over 52 years (SN 1921B through SN 1973K), a record which stood until 2009 when passed by Tom Boles. Zwicky did his laborious work, comparing photographic plates with the human eye, which is far more challenging and difficult than Boles accomplished using modern technology for his record.

=== Gravitational lenses ===
In 1937, Zwicky posited that galaxies could act as gravitational lenses by the previously discovered Einstein effect. It was not until 1979 that this effect was confirmed by observation of the so-called "Twin Quasar" Q0957+561.

=== Dark matter ===
Accounts of the history of the cosmological concept of dark matter typically start with Zwicky's work on galaxy clusters. While examining the Coma galaxy cluster in 1933, Zwicky was the first to use the virial theorem to discover the existence of a gravitational anomaly. Using the number of observed galaxies, crude approximations for the size of the cluster, and the average mass of a galaxy, the virial theorems' balance of average kinetic and potential energy predicted a velocity dispersion much lower than the observed value. Zwicky concluded that

If this would be confirmed, we would get the surprising result that dark matter is present in much greater amount than luminous matter.

While this is sometimes cited as the first use of the term dark matter, Zwicky himself had used it earlier, in ways that were a continuation of its use in previous work by Jacobus Kapteyn, Jan Oort, and James Jeans.

Zwicky revisited the issue in his famous 1937 paper on galaxy clusters. That paper also framed his hypothesis that the dark matter was simply ordinary matter that was non-luminous.

=== Tired light ===
When Edwin Hubble discovered a somewhat linear relationship between the distance to a galaxy and its redshift expressed as a velocity, Zwicky immediately pointed out that the correlation between the calculated distances of galaxies and their redshifts had a discrepancy too large to fit in the distance's error margins. He proposed that the reddening effect was not due to motions of the galaxy, but to an unknown phenomenon that caused photons to lose energy as they traveled through space. He considered the most likely candidate process to be a drag effect in which photons transfer momentum to surrounding masses through gravitational interactions; and proposed that an attempt be made to put this effect on a sound theoretical footing with general relativity. He also considered and rejected explanations involving interactions with free electrons, or the expansion of space.

Zwicky was skeptical of the expansion of space in 1929, because the rates measured at that time seemed too large. It was not until 1956 that Walter Baade corrected the distance scale based on Cepheid variable stars, and ushered in the first accurate measures of the expansion rate. Cosmological redshift is now conventionally understood to be a consequence of the expansion of space; a feature of Big Bang cosmology.

=== Catalog of Galaxies and Clusters ===
Zwicky devoted considerable time to the search for galaxies and the production of catalogs. From 1961 to 1968 he and his colleagues published a comprehensive six volume Catalogue of galaxies and of clusters of galaxies. They were all published in Pasadena, by the California Institute of Technology.

1. Zwicky, F.; Herzog, E.; Wild, P. (1961), Catalogue of Galaxies and of Clusters of Galaxies, vol. 1, California Institute of Technology
2. Zwicky, F.; Herzog, E.; Wild, P. (1963), Catalogue of Galaxies and of Clusters of Galaxies, vol. 2, California Institute of Technology
3. Zwicky, F.; Herzog, E.; Wild, P. (1966), Catalogue of Galaxies and of Clusters of Galaxies, vol. 3, California Institute of Technology
4. Zwicky, F.; Herzog, E. (1968), Catalogue of Galaxies and of Clusters of Galaxies, vol. 4, California Institute of Technology
5. Zwicky, F.; Karpowicz, M.; Kowal, C.T. (1965), Catalogue of Galaxies and of Clusters of Galaxies, vol. 5, California Institute of Technology
6. Zwicky, F.; Kowal, C.T. (1968), Catalogue of Galaxies and of Clusters of Galaxies, vol. 6, California Institute of Technology

Galaxies in the original catalog are called Zwicky galaxies, and the catalog is still maintained and updated today. Zwicky with his wife Margaritha also produced an important catalog of compact galaxies, sometimes called simply The Red Book.

Zwicky, F.; Zwicky, M.A. (1971), "Catalogue of selected compact galaxies and of post-eruptive galaxies", Guemligen: Zwicky, Bibcode:1971cscg.book.....Z

=== Morphological analysis ===
Zwicky developed a generalised form of morphological analysis, which is a method for systematically structuring and investigating the total set of relationships contained in multi-dimensional, usually non-quantifiable, problem complexes. He wrote books on the subject in 1957 and 1969, and claimed that he made many of his discoveries using this method.

=== Original thinker ===
Zwicky was an original thinker, and his contemporaries frequently had no way of knowing which of his ideas would work out and which would not. In a retrospective look at Zwicky's life and work, Stephen Maurer said:

When researchers talk about neutron stars, dark matter, and gravitational lenses, they all start the same way: "Zwicky noticed this problem in the 1930s. Back then, nobody listened..."

He is celebrated for the discovery of neutron stars. He also proposed a concept he called nuclear goblins, which he described as "a body of nuclear density ... only stable under sufficient external pressure within a massive and dense star". He considered that these goblins could move within a star, and explode violently as they reach less dense regions towards the star's surface, and serve to explain eruptive phenomena, such as flare stars. This idea has never caught on.

An anecdote often told of Zwicky concerns an informal experiment to see if he could reduce problems with turbulence hindering an observation session one night at Mount Wilson Observatory. He told his assistant to fire a gun out through the telescope slit, in the hope it would help smooth out the turbulence. No effect was noticed, but the event shows the kind of lateral thinking for which Zwicky was famous.

In a talk to a Caltech PhD student Frank Malina, who experienced some difficulties working on a dissertation regarding characteristics of oxygen-gasoline rocket engine, Fritz Zwicky claimed the engineer "must realize that a rocket could not operate in space as it required the atmosphere to push against to provide thrust". Zwicky later admitted that he had been mistaken.

He was also very proud of his work in producing the first artificial meteors. He placed explosive charges in the nose cone of a V2 rocket, to be detonated at high altitude and fire high velocity pellets of metal through the atmosphere. The first attempts appeared to be failures, and Zwicky sought to try again with the Aerobee rocket. His requests were denied, until the Soviet Union launched Sputnik 1. Twelve days later, on October 16, 1957, Zwicky launched his experiment on the Aerobee, and successfully fired pellets visible from the Mount Palomar observatory. It is thought that one of these pellets may have escaped the gravitational pull of the Earth and become the first object launched into a solar orbit.

Zwicky also considered the possibility of rearranging the universe to our own liking. In a lecture in 1948 he spoke of changing planets, or relocating them within the Solar System. In the 1960s he even considered how the whole Solar System might be moved like a giant spaceship to travel to other stars. He considered this might be achieved by firing pellets into the Sun to produce asymmetrical fusion explosions, and by this means he thought that the star Alpha Centauri might be reached within 2500 years.

== Humanitarian ==
Zwicky was a humanitarian with concern for wider society. These two sides of his nature came together in the aftermath of the Second World War, when Zwicky worked hard to collect tons of books on astronomy and other topics, and shipped them to war-ravaged scientific libraries in Europe and Asia.

He also had a longstanding involvement with the charitable Pestalozzi Foundation of America, supporting orphanages. Zwicky received their gold medal in 1955, in recognition of his services.

Zwicky loved the mountains, and was an accomplished alpine climber.

He was critical of political posturing by all sides in the Middle East, and of the use of nuclear weapons in World War II. He considered that hope for the world lay with free people of good will who work together as needed, without institutions or permanent organizations.

== Media persona ==
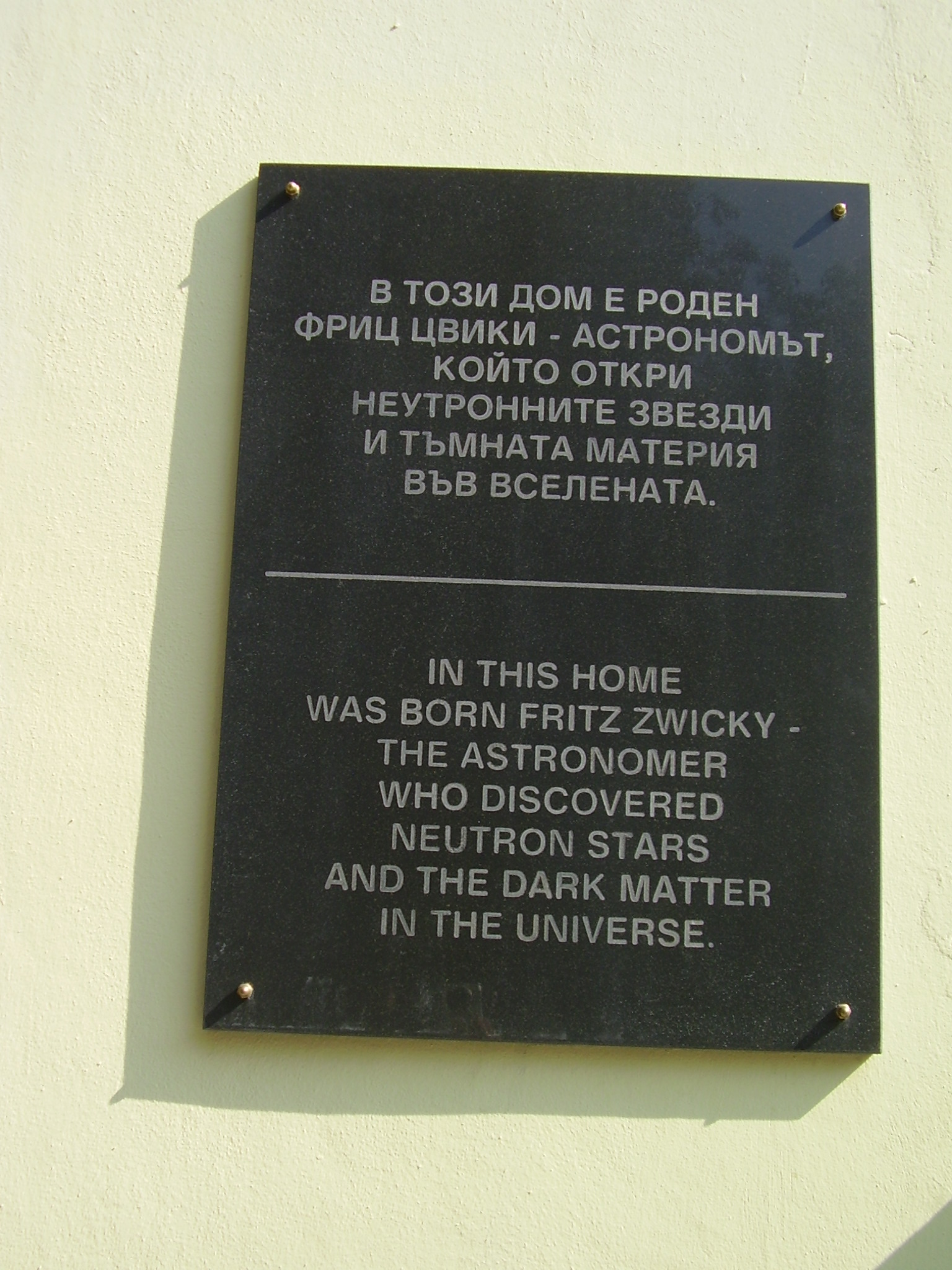
The memorial plaque on the house in Varna where Zwicky was born. His contributions to the understanding of the neutron stars and the dark matter are explicitly mentioned.

Zwicky's ideas captured the imagination of the public. He was widely quoted by reporters.

The New York Times published updates of Zwicky's supernova search on a regular basis. In 1934 he was featured in Literary Digest's "They Stand Out from the Crowd" column, ... and in 1935 he gave a Science Service Radio Talk titled "Stellar Guests". ...

In January 1934, Los Angeles Times published the cartoon "Be Scientific with Ol' Doc Dabble", which had a caption describing Zwicky's research and which implicitly caricatured him as "Doc Dabble".

Some scenes of the 13th episode of Cosmos: A Spacetime Odyssey depicts an actor playing Fritz Zwicky, at the same time that Neil DeGrasse Tyson talks about the importance of Zwicky's studies on supernovae.

== Honors ==
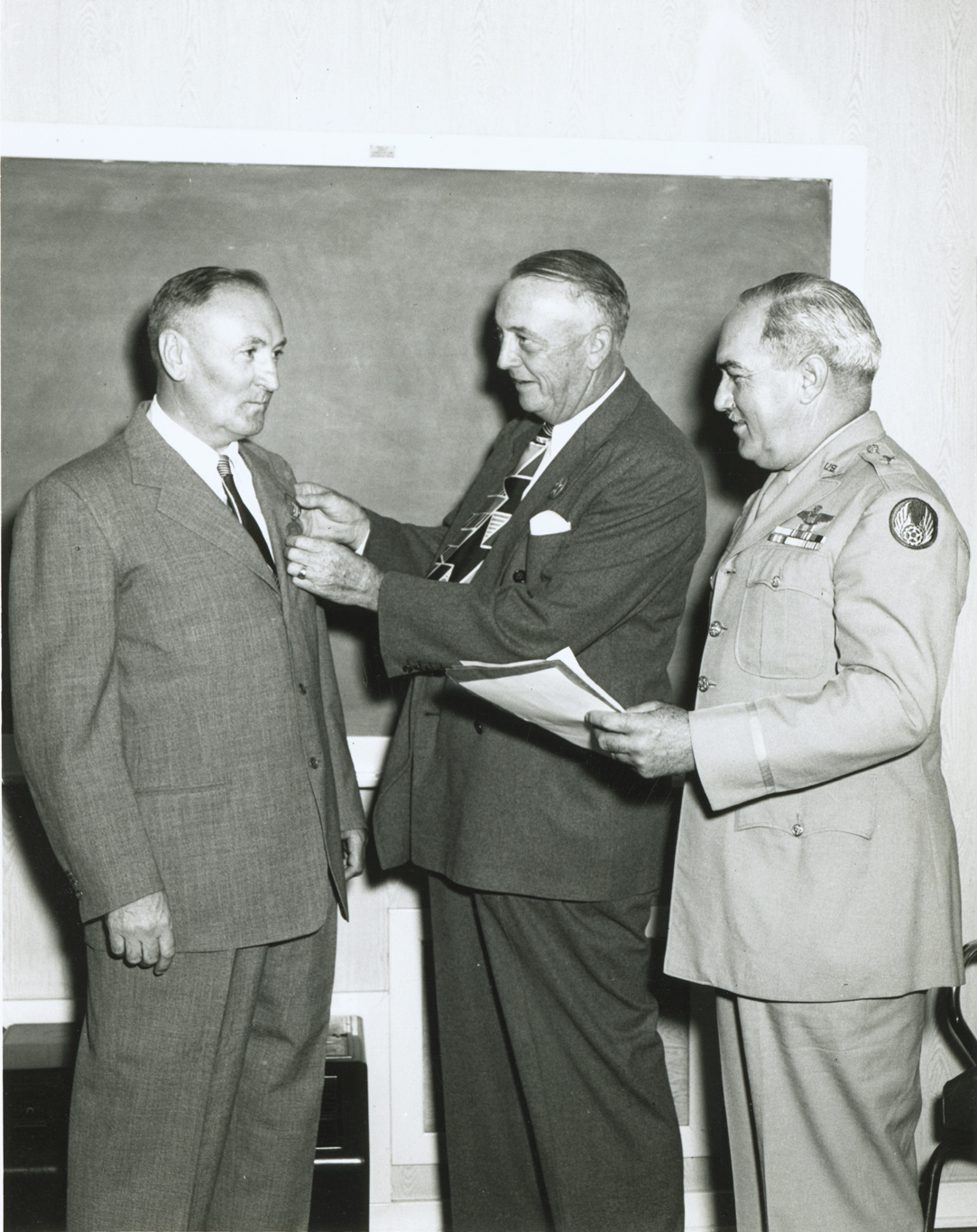
Presentation of the Presidential Medal of Freedom to Fritz Zwicky by Secretary of the Navy Dan A. Kimball and General S. Chapman US Air Force, September 1949, Azusa, California

- In 1949, Truman awarded Zwicky the Medal of Freedom, for work on rocket propulsion during World War II. In 1968, Zwicky was made professor emeritus at California Institute of Technology.
- In 1972, Zwicky was awarded the Gold Medal of the Royal Astronomical Society, their most prestigious award, for "distinguished contributions to astronomy and cosmology". This award noted in particular his work on neutron stars, dark matter, and cataloging of galaxies.
- The asteroid 1803 Zwicky and the lunar crater Zwicky are both named in his honor.
- The Zwicky Transient Facility is named in his honor.

== Publications ==
Zwicky produced hundreds of publications, covering many topics. This is a brief selection with comments.

- Zwicky, F. (October 1929), "On the Red Shift of Spectral Lines through Interstellar Space", Proceedings of the National Academy of Sciences, 15 (10): 773–779, Bibcode:1929PNAS...15..773Z, doi:10.1073/pnas.15.10.773, PMC 522555, PMID 16577237. This is the article that proposes a tired light model to explain Hubble's law. (full article)
- Baade, W.; Zwicky, F. (1934), "On Super-novae", Proceedings of the National Academy of Sciences, 20 (5): 254–259, Bibcode:1934PNAS...20..254B, doi:10.1073/pnas.20.5.254, PMC 1076395, PMID 16587881, and Baade, W.; Zwicky, F. (1934), "Cosmic Rays from Super-novae", Proceedings of the National Academy of Sciences, 20 (5): 259–263, Bibcode:1934PNAS...20..259B, doi:10.1073/pnas.20.5.259, PMC 1076396, PMID 16587882. These consecutive articles introduce the notion of a supernova and a neutron star respectively.
- Zwicky, F. (November 1938), "On Collapsed Neutron Stars", Astrophysical Journal, 88: 522–525, Bibcode:1938ApJ....88..522Z, doi:10.1086/144003. The idea of a neutron star, previously introduced in the supernova paper, is explained along with the idea of critical stellar mass and black holes.
- Zwicky, F. (December 1939), "On the Formation of Clusters of Nebulae and the Cosmological Time Scale", Proceedings of the National Academy of Sciences, 25 (12): 604–609, Bibcode:1939PNAS...25..604Z, doi:10.1073/pnas.25.12.604, PMC 1077981, PMID 16588306. Zwicky argues that the shape of nebulae indicate a universe far older than can be accounted for by an expanding universe model.
- Zwicky, F. (August 1941), "A Mosaic Objective Grating for the 18-inch Schmidt Telescope on Palomar Mountain", Publications of the Astronomical Society of the Pacific, 53 (314): 242–244, Bibcode:1941PASP...53..242Z, doi:10.1086/125331. Zwicky was a great advocate for the use of the wide angle Schmidt telescope, which he used to great effect to make many discoveries.
- Zwicky, F. (1945), Report on certain phases of war research in Germany, Aerojet Engineering Corp, ASIN B0007FJ1YY. Zwicky did work on jet propulsion and other matters with Aerojet corporation during and after the war.
- Zwicky, F. (1957), Morphological astronomy, Springer-Verlag, ASIN B0006AVA3K. In this book Zwicky gives free rein to his ideas on morphological research as a tool for making discoveries in astronomy.
- Zwicky, F. (October 1958), "Nuclear Goblins and Flare Stars", Publications of the Astronomical Society of the Pacific, 70 (416): 506–508, Bibcode:1958PASP...70..506Z, doi:10.1086/127284. As well as proposing neutron stars, Zwicky also proposed unstable aggregations of neutron density matter within larger stars.
- Zwicky, F. (1966), Entdecken, Erfinden, Forschen im Morphologischen Weltbild, Droemer Knaur, Bibcode:1966eefi.book.....Z
- Zwicky, F. (1969), Discovery, invention, research through the morphological approach, MacMillan, ISBN 978-1114243064. Zwicky also proposed that the morphological approach could be applied to all kinds of issues in disciplines going far beyond basic science.
