= Frank K. Edmondson =

American astronomer

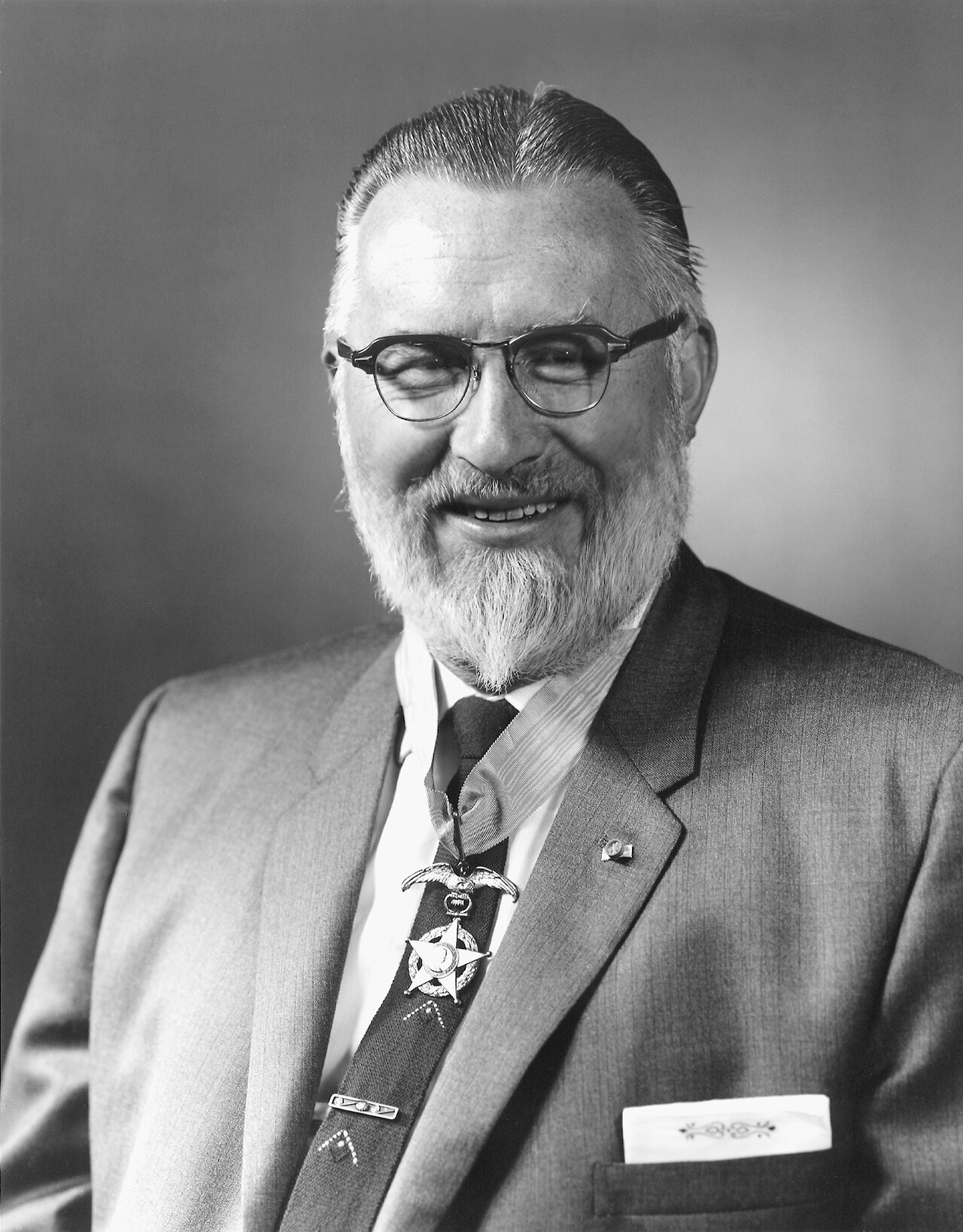
- Edmondson in 1962
- Born: Frank Kelley Edmondson; August 1, 1912; Milwaukee, Wisconsin
- Died: December 8, 2008 (aged 96); Bloomington, Indiana
- Education: Indiana University; Harvard University (Ph.D.)
- Known for: Indiana Asteroid Program
- Spouse: Emma Margaret Russell (m. 1934; died 1999)
- Scientific career
- Fields: Astronomy, physics
- Workplaces: Indiana University; Lowell Observatory
- Thesis: The Absorption of Light in the Galaxy (1937)
- Doctoral advisor: Bart Bok

Frank Kelley Edmondson (August 1, 1912 – December 8, 2008) was an American astronomer.

== Life and career ==
Edmondson was born in Milwaukee, Wisconsin and grew up in Seymour, Indiana. He graduated from Indiana University in 1933 and received a fellowship to work at Lowell Observatory in Flagstaff, Arizona, where he stayed until 1935, working as an observing assistant to Clyde Tombaugh, discoverer of the dwarf planet Pluto. After earning his Ph.D. under the direction of Bart Bok at Harvard University in 1937, Edmondson returned to Indiana University as a faculty member in the department of astronomy. In 1944, he became the department's chair, a position he held until 1978.

An early accomplishment of Edmondson's was the creation of the Indiana Asteroid Program, a photographic program to locate asteroids that were "lost" when systematic observations were interrupted by World War II. He also negotiated the donation of the privately owned Goethe Link Observatory near Brooklyn, Indiana to Indiana University. Nearly 7000 photographic plates for asteroid orbit studies were taken with a 10-inch astrographic camera at the Goethe Link Observatory. These plates are now archived at Lowell Observatory.

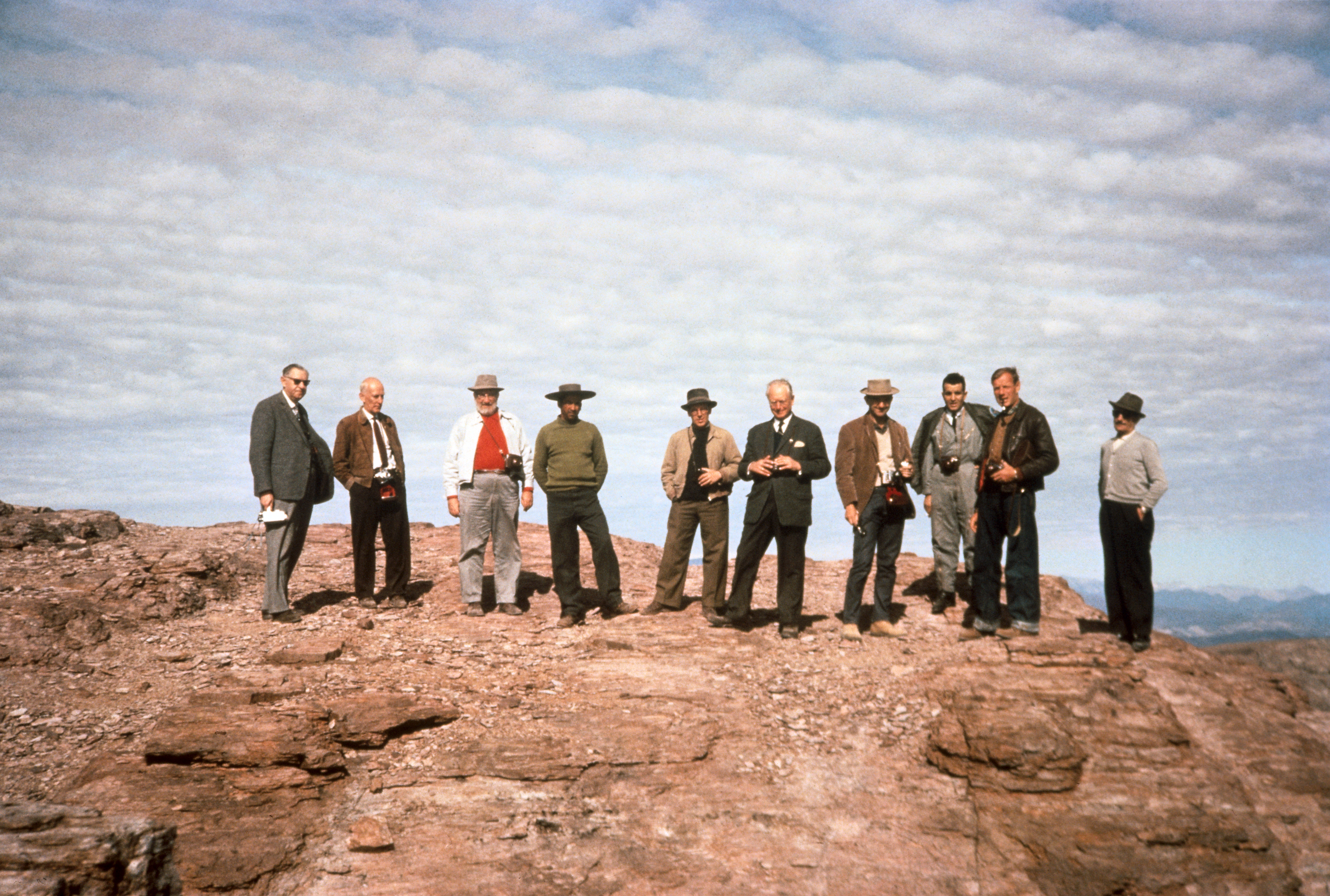
On June 8–10, 1963, ESO officials were the guests of AURA on their property and on June 10 gathered on Cerro El Morado, discussing ESO prospects in Chile. From left to right: H. Siedentopf, J.H. Oort, F.K. Edmondson, tour guide, A.B. Muller, O. Heckmann, Ch. Fehrenbach, unknown person, J. Stock and Sr Marchetti (architect).

In addition to pursuing studies in stellar kinematics, galactic structure, asteroid astrometry and the history of astronomy, Edmondson served as Program Director for Astronomy of the National Science Foundation (1956–1957), treasurer of the American Astronomical Society (1954–1975) and statistical advisor to Dr. Alfred Kinsey during his studies of human sexuality. He also advised in the development and site selection of the National Optical Astronomy Observatories, which include the Kitt Peak National Observatory in Arizona, the Cerro Tololo Inter-American Observatory in Chile and the National Solar Observatory in New Mexico. He was also instrumental in creating the Association of Universities for Research in Astronomy (AURA), a consortium of 38 U. S. astronomical institutions and seven foreign affiliates, that manages the three observatories plus the Space Telescope Science Institute which directs research with the Hubble Space Telescope. He was AURA's president from 1962 to 1965. He was a member of the Minor Planet Commission of the International Astronomical Union (IAU), and was its president from 1970 to 1973. He chaired the United States National Committee of the IAU from 1963 to 1964.

After his retirement from Indiana University in 1983, Edmondson devoted himself to compiling histories of AURA and the Indiana University astronomy department. The asteroid 1761 Edmondson is named for him.

== Personal life ==
In 1934, Edmondson married Emma Margaret Russell (1914–1999), the youngest daughter of astronomer Henry Norris Russell. Their children are Margaret Edmondson Olson, married to astronomer Edward Olson, and Frank Edmondson, Jr.

== Book ==
- AURA and its US National Observatories, Cambridge University Press, 1997. ISBN 0-521-55345-8
