= Cajón del Maipo =

Canyon in the Chilean Andes

- Maipo Canyon
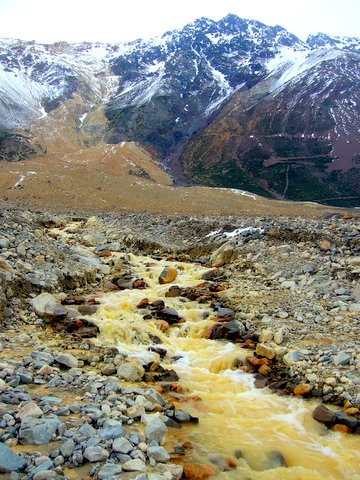

Geography
- Location: Santiago Metropolitan Region, Chile
- Coordinates: 34.01°S 70.13°W
- River: Maipo River

Location
- Location in Chile

Cajón del Maipo is a canyon located in the Andean southeastern portion of the Santiago Metropolitan Region, Chile. It encompasses the upper Maipo River basin, where the river has entrenched itself in a narrow valley. The zone features a series of confluent rivers such as El Volcán River, Yeso River, and Colorado River, as well as other minor streams, including San Gabriel, Manzanito, Coyanco, El Sauce, El Manzano and San José. The main locality is San José de Maipo, the capital of the commune that includes all of the Andean sector of the Metropolitan Region. The valley ends close to Pirque and begins almost at the border with Argentina, where it is surrounded by some of the highest peaks in the region, including San José, Maipo, and Marmolejo, the most southerly mountain taller than 6,000 metres (20,000 ft) in the world. Several of the mountains are active volcanoes; San José was the most recent to erupt, in 1960.

The canyon is a popular tourist destination for hikers and campers. Among the most visited sites are the reservoir Embalse El Yeso, and El Morado Natural Monument which contains the San Francisco glacier.
