= AES Andes =

Chilean producer and distributor of electricity

AES Andes S.A.
- Formerly: AES Gener S.A.
- Type: Public subsidiary
- Traded as: BCS: AESANDES
- Industry: Utility
- Founded: 1921; 105 years ago
- Headquarters: Santiago, Chile
- Key people: André Gluski Weilert (Chairman); Ricardo Manuel Fal (CEO)
- Products: Electricity generation.
- Revenue: ▲US$ 2.3 billion (2012)
- Net income: ▼US$ 202.9 million (2012)
- Number of employees: 421
- Parent: AES Corporation (99%)
- Website: aesandes.com/en

AES Andes S.A., formerly AES Gener S.A., is a producer and distributor of electricity based in Santiago, Chile. It is a subsidiary of American Company AES Corporation which operates in South America's Andes region.

== History ==
The business, formerly known as Chilectra Generacion, was first incorporated via public deed by the federal government in 1981.

In 1987, Chilectra was divided into three independent companies: two distributors (Chilectra and Chilquinta) and a generator and distributor (Chilgener). The majority stake of Chilgener was acquired by AES in the year 2000, as part of a financial transaction that led to the company being renamed AES Gener.

On 23 April 2021, shareholders of the company agreed to change its name again to AES Andes.

== Properties ==
AES Andes owns several engineering plants across the Andes, several of which run off hydroelectric or thermoelectric power. These properties are predominantly operated by regional subsidiaries of AES, such as Norgener S.A., Alto Maipo SpA, and Sociedad Electrica Santiago. Some of their most important assets include the following:

- Chivor Hydroelectric Power Plant: The Chivor Plant is a 1,000 MW hydroelectric plant based in Bogotá. It is the largest engineering project in Colombia, providing 8% of the country's electric power. Construction of this power plant began in 1970 and was completed in 1982. Furthermore, prior to its acquisition by AES during 2000 as part of the company's purchase of Gener SA, ownership of this property went through a series of transfers. Notably, the plant was sold by Interconexion Electrica to ISAGEN during 1995, in accordance to a demerger resulting from the implementation of the Electric Power Act. A year later the general meeting of ISAGEN shareholders, under request from the Colombian federal government, sold off ownership of the Chivor plant to Gener S.A.
- Tunjita Power Plant: Based in Macanal, and built in 2012, the Tunjita plant draws upon the water flowing from its adjacent river's deviation tunnel, in order to generate electrical power. Furthermore, this plant can be operated by remote-controls located from Gener's :Chivor Hydroelectric Center:. It has 19.8 megawatts installed capacity, along with two 9.9-megawatt generation units.
- Norgener: AES Andes currently possesses two coal-fueled, Norgener power plant based in Northern Chile, which are jointly owned by fellow subsidiary AES Energy, and operated through its own subsidiary Empresa Eléctrica Angamos S.A. Both units have 260-megawatt installed capacity, in addition to being integrated with 20-megawatt storage systems. AES Andes also possesses a third plant with 12-megawatt capacity, located at the Norgener power station in Los Andes. This solar powered plant, which AES acquired in 2009, is utilized in order to bolster grid reliability and efficiency.
- Electrica Angamos: In 2011, construction of the 554-megawatt thermal power plant, :AES Energy Storage Angamos Battery Energy Storage System: was completed. It is a joint project with AES Andes, and its subsidiary :Empresa Eléctrica Angamos:. It is located in the town of Mejillones in Northern Chile, an important mining region in the country. It current has a 2-megawatt grid energy storage solution that provides reserve energy in the event of power outages.
- Cochrane Power Station: Jointly developed and owned by AES Andes (which owns 60% of the shares) and DL Energy (which owns 40% of the shares), and located in Mejjillones in Northern Chile. This plant is coal-fired, and has a cross generating capacity of 531 megawatts. The plant's primary utility is to provide electricity for Chile's mining sector, which remains one of the nation's key industries. In 2017, Gener provided this plant with an energy storage project of 20 megawatts, which provides spinning reserves and grid reliability services directed towards Chile's Norte Grande Interconnected System.
- Guacolda: Located in Huasco. This coal-fired thermoelectric plant operates at roughly 608-megawatt capacity, and ownership is divided up between AES Andes, :Empresas Copec (COP. SN): and :Inversiones Ultraterra:, with AES possessing roughly 50% of the plant's interests.
- Maipo: Currently under construction. Maipo is expected to boast 531 megawatts of hydropower, and will be located in the southeast of Santiago City. Construction of this particular complex is being undertaken by the Austrian company Strabag, which currently owns a 7% stake in the project.
- Electrica Santiago: A subsidiary of AES Andes which operates four plants operates four plants ("Nueva Renca", "Renca", "Los Vientos", and "Santa Lidia". These coal-fired plants were acquired in 2011, and generate a cumulative 750-megawatt output.
- Languna Verde & Laguna Verde GT3: This plant is located 30 kilometers south of Valparaíso, and has an installed capacity of 47 megawatts. It also possesses an open-cycle turbine containing 19 megawatts of power. This particular station is one of the oldest properties that AES Andes owns, having first been commissioned in 1939. Although this plant was originally powered by coal, it has transitioned to diesel fuel.
- ALFALFAL: Located in southeast Santiago. The ALFALFAL has two hydroelectric units, both of which first become operational during summer 1991. This station uses energy generated from the Colorado River and olive groves to power its central pass, which hosts 178-megawatt capacity.
- QUELTEHUES: The QUELTHESUS is a power plant with 49-megawatt capacity, and with three generating units. It is located on the right bank of the Maipo River, near San Gabriel in Cajón del Maipo.
- Volcan: This hydroelectric plant is located near the Volcan River tributary of the Mapio. Drawing power from the generation flow of the river, this 13-megawatt plant provides electricity through its hydraulic technology.
- Laja: This thermoelectric plant has been in service since 1995 and is located alongside a road leading to the city of Laja. It has a generating unit that produces 13 megawatts.
- Electrica Ventanas: Located in Chile, and acquired by Gener in 2010. The plant was originally built in 1964 then expanded in 1977, 2010 and 2013. This coal-fired plant has an installed megawatt capacity of 875.
- Electrica Campiche: Located in Chile, and acquired by Gener in 2013. This coal-fired plant has an installed megawatt capacity of 272.

== Criticism ==
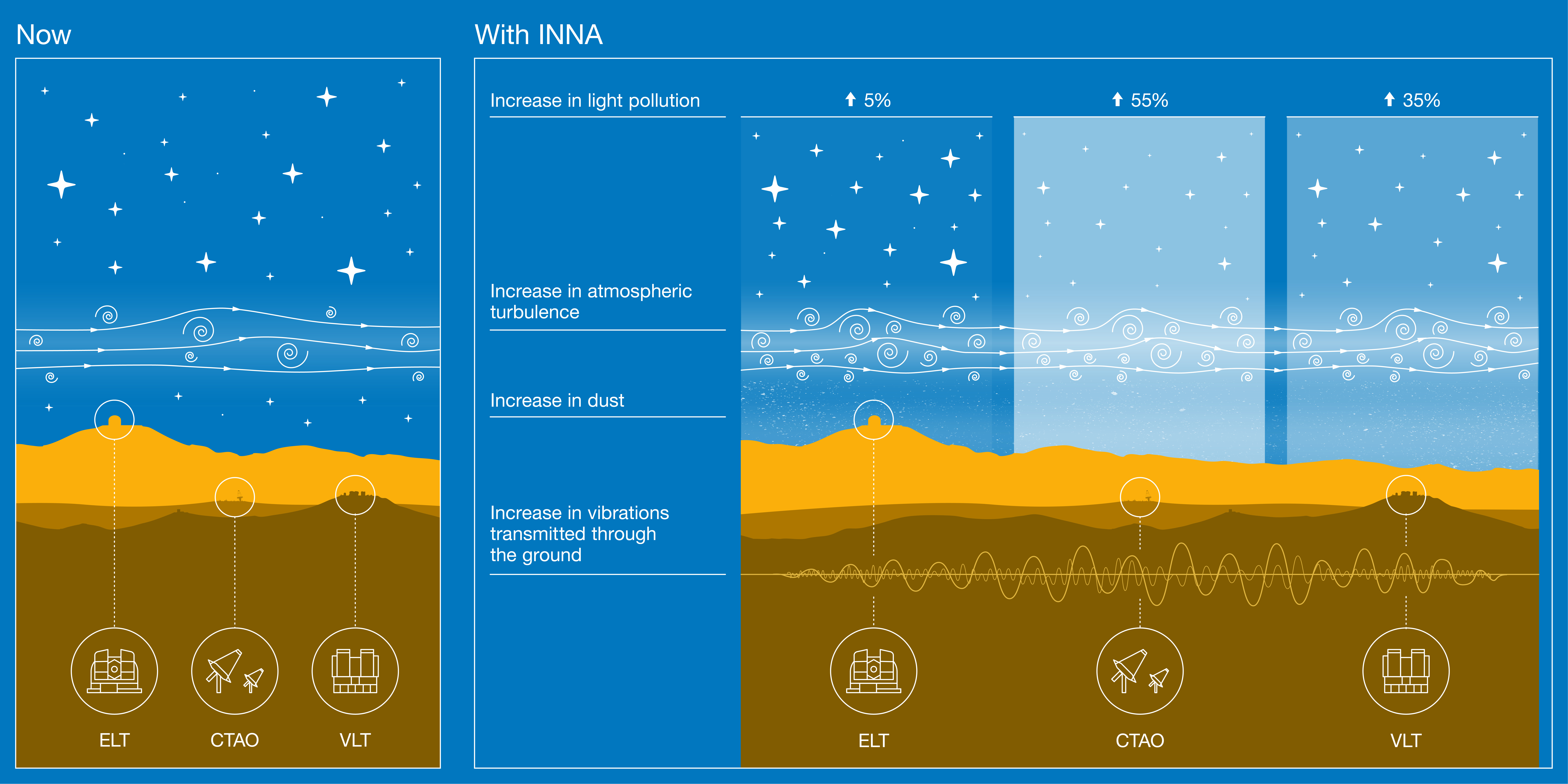
Impact of the INNA megaproject, by AES Andes, on the facilities at Paranal Observatory.

A plan for a new facility of AES Andes is seen by ESO as a risk thread to the Paranal Observatory, the location of the Very Large Telescope (VLT). The new facility is called INNA. The project would be equipped with 1000 lights and increase the light pollution over the VLT by at least 35%. The site of the Extremely Large Telescope (ELT), ESO's new prime telescope, would see an increase of light pollution by at least 5%. Additionally vibrations would increase turbulence especially by wind turbines, decreasing seeing by 40%. Vibrations would impact the VLT and the ELT, which are very sensitive to micro-seismic noise during observations. Dust during construction could also settle on the mirrors of the telescopes. Another telescope site that would be heavily impacted is the southern part of the Cherenkov Telescope Array, increasing light pollution by 55%. A full report was submitted to the Chilean authorities in the end of March 2025. An executive summary of the report is available online for the public in advance. ESO demands a relocation of the project, but supports the development of a green-energy project at another site. As of December 2024 the project was in early-stage development and AES Andes did not make an investment decision. A memorandum of understanding concerning the project was signed between AES Andes and Samsung C&T.
