= Otto Heckmann =

German astronomer (1901–1983)

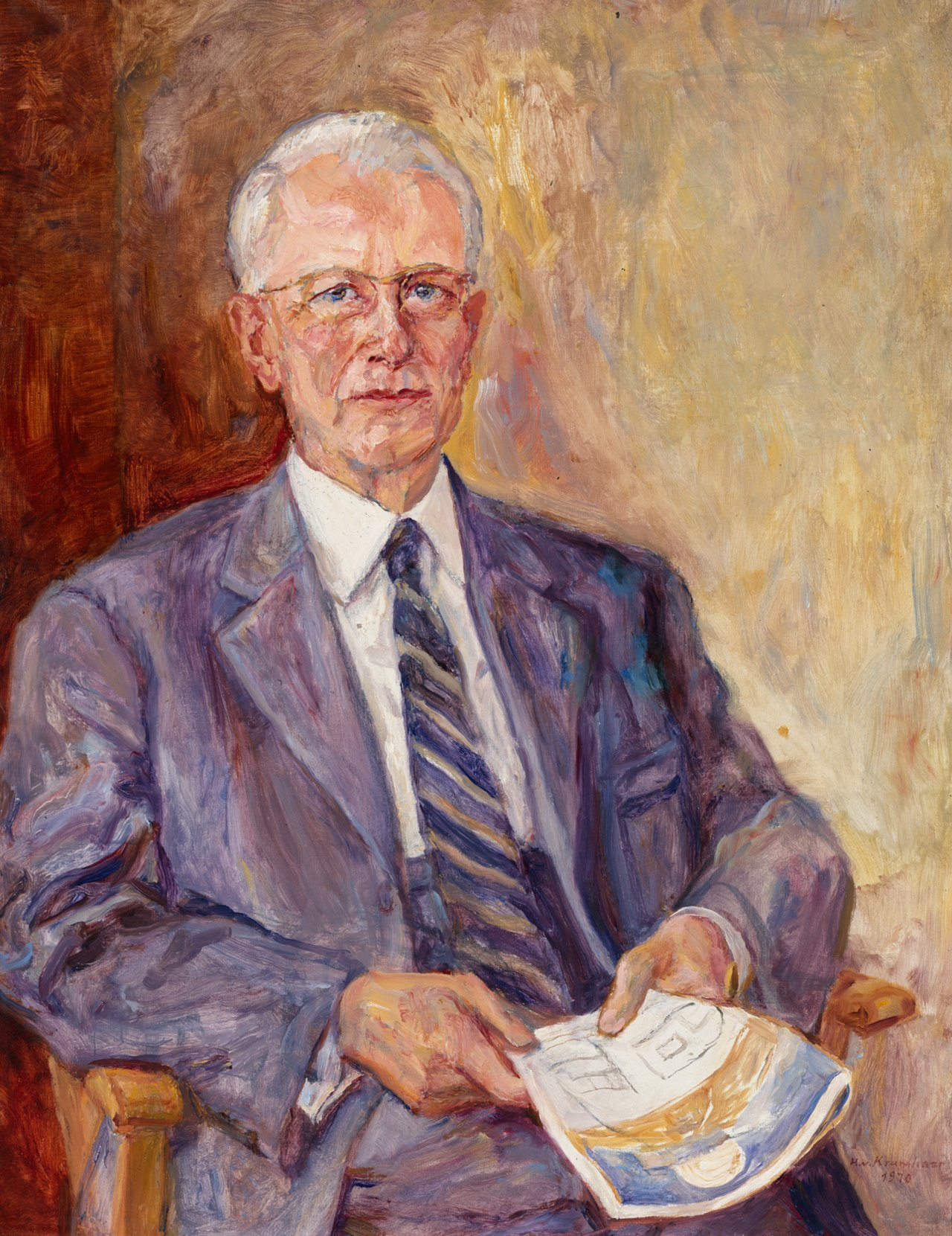
- Painting of Heckmann as ESO Director General
- Born: June 23, 1901; Opladen, German Empire
- Died: May 13, 1983 (aged 81); Regensburg, West Germany
- Citizenship: Prussia
- Education: University of Bonn
- Awards: James Craig Watson Medal in 1961; Prix Jules Janssen in 1962; Bruce Medal in 1964
- Scientific career
- Fields: astronomy
- Workplaces: Hamburg Observatory

Otto Hermann Leopold Heckmann (June 23, 1901 – May 13, 1983) was a German mathematician and astronomer, director of the Hamburg Observatory from 1941 to 1962, after which he became the first director of the European Southern Observatory. He actively contributed to the creation of the third issue of the Astronomische Gesellschaft Katalog. He also contributed to cosmology based on the fundamentals of general relativity, and in 1942 wrote the book Theorien der Kosmologie.

== Early life and education ==
Otto Heckmann was born to Agnes Heckmann, née Grüter and Max Heckmann, a notary, a Catholic family in Opladen in 1901. He studied mathematics, physics, and astronomy at the University of Bonn. He wrote a thesis in astrometry under Karl Friedrich Küstner about a star cluster in Praesepe and received a doctorate in 1925. He married in 1925 and worked for two years in the Bonn Observatory with Küstner, who was involved in the planning of star catalog Astronomische Gesellschaft Katalog 2 of the Northern Hemisphere.

== Career ==
In 1927 Heckmann was appointed to the faculty of the University of Göttingen and worked in the Göttingen Observatory under Hans Kienle. In 1929, Heckmann obtained his habilitation of astrometry in the star group Coma Berenices.

=== 1933–1945 ===
After Adolf Hitler had come to power in 1933, at least 48 colleagues in the science faculty at Göttingen were driven into exile because of their religious, or more rarely political beliefs (Gesetz zur Wiederherstellung des Berufsbeamtentums, 7 April 1933), amongst them Max Born. Heckmann was tasked to continue Born's lectures in optics and asked Born to give him his lecture notes, which Born refused. Heckmann initially thought that he could survive the system by retreating into science alone. In September 1933, the local NSDAP judged Heckmann as "long time member of the leftist wing of the Catholic Zentrumspartei, unreliable and pro-Jewish (judenfreundlich)". In 1934, 3 professors from Frankfurt tried to recruit him, but were thwarted by the denuciation of Karl Boda, a competitor. Likewise, in 1934 Walther Gerlach (1889–1979) suggested he come to München, but a Nazi official (Gaudozentenbundsführer Wilhelm Führer) and a member of the Nationalsozialistischer Deutscher Studentenbund turned him down. Heckman probably would not have had any opportunities in academia if he had not taken steps to change the assessment of the local Nazi representatives. And due to his high specialization, Heckmann found himself without professional alternatives, such as industry. In 1934, Heckmann joined the NS-Fliegerkorps, attended Wehrsportlager in Borna near Leipzig, the Dozentenakademie in Kiel-Buchenhagen. He signed the Vow of allegiance of the Professors of the German Universities and High-Schools to Adolf Hitler and the National Socialistic State. On July 10, 1934, he joined the Nationalsozialistische Volkswohlfahrt. Starting 1935, the Nazi representatives evaluated him as more adapted and conforming to the system. In December 1936, he was urged to apply for the position vacated by Erwin Finlay Freundlich at the University of Istanbul, a highly political position serving military interests (observation of the sun's surface for solar flares resulting in interference with radio communications on Earth), but eventually Hans Oswald Rosenberg was chosen.

Until 1935, Heckmann measured star colors in the red and blue spectrum with photometry with a telescope costing "two years of painstaking adjustment until it began working properly". In 1935, he received the honorary title of professor. After 1937 they used a Schmidt telescope with an aperture of about 38 centimeters.

In the fall of 1937 the Hamburg University faculty finally called on Heckmann, after having been obstructed for years by the Government of the Reich, and by various agencies within the Nazi Party. On May 1, 1937, Heckmann joined the Nazi Party, encouraged by Werner Heisenberg in order to thwart members of Deutsche Physik to occupy teaching positions. However, in 1938, the leader of the Reichsdozentenbund (an association of government lecturers dominated by the Nazis), refused to permit Heckmann to occupy the position arguing most of his publications were co-authored and his solo-authored publications on relativity theory represented a Jewish world view. In 1938, Heckmann participated in ideological instruction at the "Reichslager für Beamte" in Bad Tölz. The appointment to Hamburg was delayed until April 1941. Finally, in 1941, Heckmann left Göttingen to direct the Hamburg Observatory, Bergedorf. After 14 years of being an extraordinary professor (assistant), he finally became officially appointed a full professor and civil servant in January 1942.

=== 1945–1969 ===
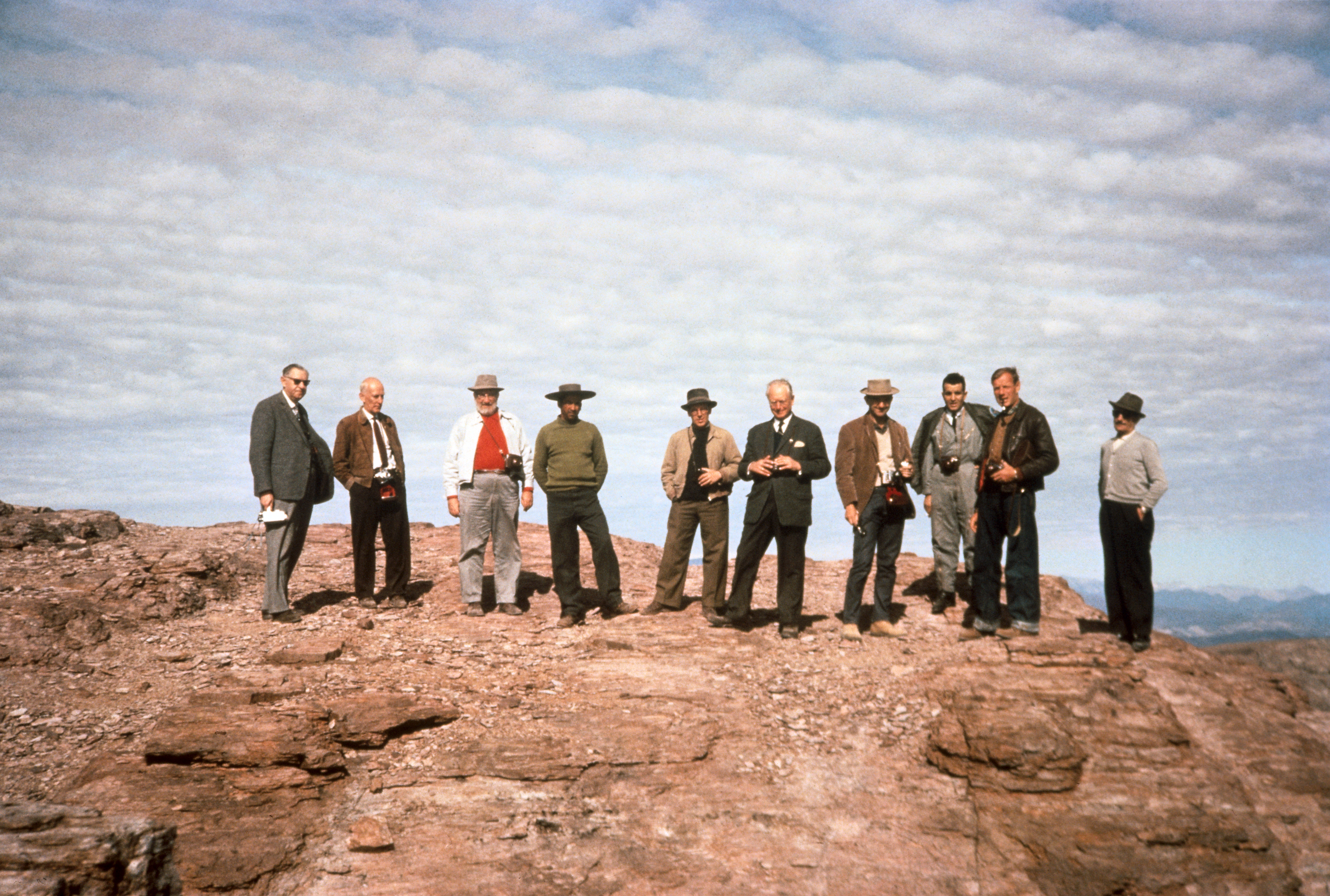
On June 8–10, 1963, ESO officials were the guests of AURA on their property and on June 10 gathered on Cerro El Morado, discussing ESO prospects in Chile. From left to right: H. Siedentopf, J.H. Oort, F.K. Edmondson, tour guide, A.B. Muller, O. Heckmann, Ch. Fehrenbach, unknown person, J. Stock and Sr Marchetti (architect).

After WWII, Heckmann worked on the establishment of a joint European Southern Observatory (ESO) in South Africa. In the 1950s he supervised the thesis of Jürgen Stock (astronomer), who eventually went on to search for and established an observatory site for the University of Chicago in Chile, after which the ESO founded their centre in Chile as well. Heckmann retired from the directorship of Hamburg Observatory in 1962.

From 1962 to 1969 he served as the first director general of the European Southern Observatory.

== Later life ==
After mandatory retirement from the university in 1969, he served as president of the International Astronomical Union (IAU) from 1967 to 1970. Charles Fehrenbach (astronomer) called him the work horse of the IAU.

Following a Polish request and under the impression of German acts in Poland during World War II, he made the controversial decision to hold an Extraordinary IAU General Assembly in February 1973 in Warsaw, Poland, to commemorate the 500th anniversary of Nicolaus Copernicus, shortly after the regular 1973 GA had been held in Australia.

== Personal life ==
He married Johanna Topfmeier in 1925 and they had three children together: Klaus, Hildegard and Ulrike. He died in his family circle in Regensburg while traveling to visit his son there.

== Legacy ==
The asteroid 1650 Heckmann is named after him.

== Awards ==
- James Craig Watson Medal in 1961
- Prix Jules Janssen in 1962
- Bruce Medal in 1964

== Works ==
- Theorien der Kosmologie. Berlin: Springer, 1942 und 1968
- Sterne, Kosmos, Weltmodelle. München: Piper, 1976 (dtv-Taschenbuch)
