= El Morado Natural Monument =

Natural monument in Chile

- IUCN category III (natural monument or feature)
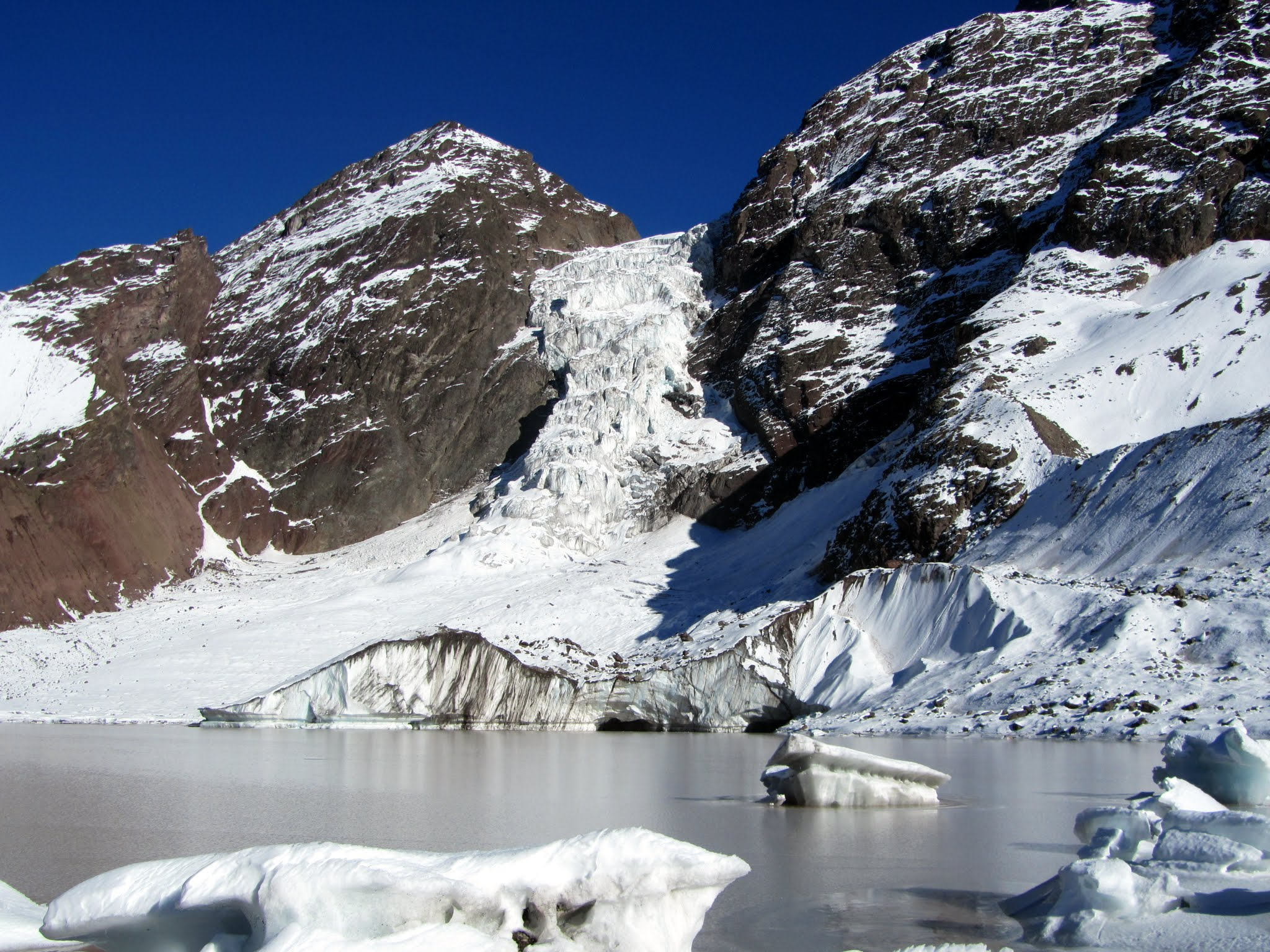
- San Francisco Glacier
- Interactive map of El Morado Natural Monument
- Location: Santiago Metropolitan Region, Chile
- Coordinates: 33°46′0″S 70°04′0″W
- Area: 30.09 km^{2} (11.62 sq mi)
- Governing body: Corporación Nacional Forestal

El Morado Natural Monument is a Chilean Natural Monument located in the Cajón del Maipo, Santiago Metropolitan Region. The monument is a glacial cirque and is part of the El Volcán River basin. Cerro El Morado dominates the landscape of this protected area. It is home to the San Francisco Glacier.

== See also ==
- San José (volcano)
- Marmolejo
- Embalse El Yeso
