= Marmolejo =

Mountain in Argentina

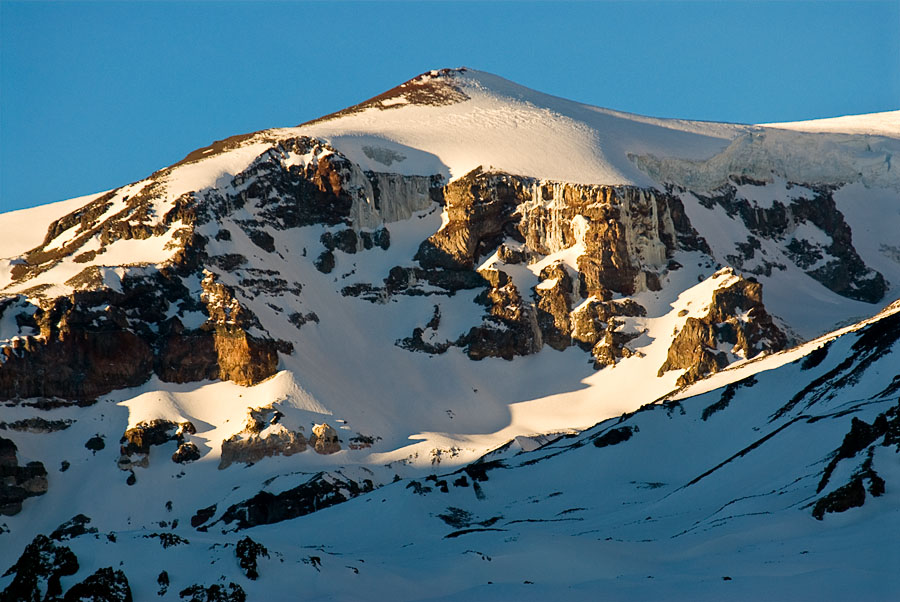
- The Marmolejo summit cone sits on the edge of a 4 km (2 mi)-wide collapsed caldera.

Highest point
- Elevation: 6,108 m (20,039 ft)
- Prominence: 2,103 m (6,900 ft)
- Parent peak: Tupungato
- Coordinates: 33°44′02.40″S 069°52′40.80″W

Geography
- Location within Argentina
- Location: Argentina-Chile
- Parent range: Principal Cordillera, Andes

Geology
- Mountain type: Stratovolcano
- Last eruption: Unknown

Climbing
- First ascent: 10 January 1928 by H. Sattler, Sebastian Krückel and A. Maass

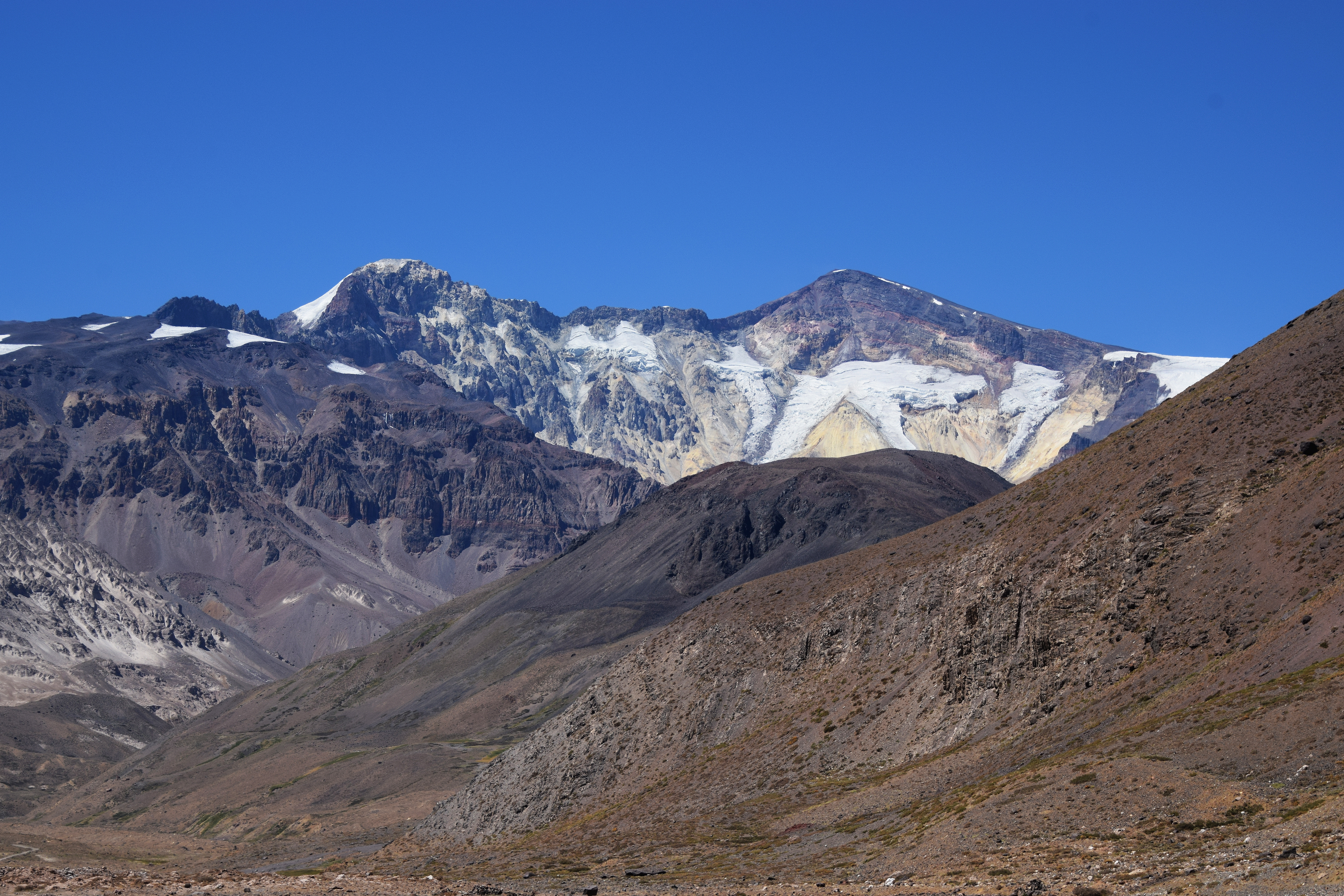
Marmolejo top seen from the north. The face of the cliff shows altered rocks from the core of the volcano.

Volcán Marmolejo (possibly "marble") is a 6,109 m (20,043 ft) high Pleistocene stratovolcano in the Andes on the border between Argentina and Chile. It is a stratovolcano formed by layers of lava flows and pyroclastic flows formed by andesite and trachyandesite, which were later cut by one or two major sector collapses that carved a 4 by 5 kilometres (2.5 mi × 3.1 mi) wide scar into its northwestern flank. The volcano was active in the Pliocene and Pleistocene.

Recent activity occurs on the neighbouring volcano San José, which has had historical eruptions. Marmolejo is covered in glaciers, which may form mudflows during renewed activity.

== Geography and geomorphology ==
Marmolejo is in the Cordillera Principal of the Andes, east of Santiago de Chile, on the border between Chile and Argentina. The Argentine sector is within the Tunuyan Department of the Mendoza Province and the Chilean within the San José de Maipo municipality of the Cordillera Province of the Metropolitan Region of Chile. It was first ascended on the 10 January 1928 by Sebastian Krückel, H. Sattler and A. Maas, who saw the Pacific Ocean and the Argentine Pampa from its summit. Ascents of Andean mountains are difficult owing to their typically remote location and extreme environmental conditions (thin air, low temperature, high sunburn risks and rough terrain). The region features a tundra vegetation until 3,500 metres (11,500 ft) altitude, above which plant cover declines.

The volcano is about 6,109 metres (20,043 ft) (Note: It has an official height of 6,108 metres (20,039 ft). Other data from available digital elevation models: SRTM yields 6,097 metres (20,003 ft), ASTER 6,103 metres (20,023 ft), ALOS 6,085 metres (19,964 ft) and TanDEM-X 6,129 metres (20,108 ft). The height of the nearest key col is 4,005 metres (13,140 ft), leading to a topographic prominence of 2,103 metres (6,900 ft). Marmolejo is considered a Mountain Range according to the Dominance System and its dominance is 34.43%. Its parent peak is Tupungato and the Topographic isolation is 42.9 kilometres (26.7 mi).) high. Marmolejo is a heavily eroded stratovolcano made out of alternating lava and pyroclastic flows of red-yellow colours. There are two parasitic cones, a lava dome and a pyroclastic cone (Note: Linked to San Jose volcano.) in its southern sector. To the northwest, the edifice is cut by a 4 by 5 kilometres (2.5 mi × 3.1 mi) wide and 2 kilometres (1.2 mi) deep ampitheatre-shaped scar that formed within a glacial cirque; It is either a sector collapse scar or a caldera; it was once intepreted as the product of a lateral blast. A debris avalanche deposit consisting of hummocky terrain with large boulders (2.5 metres (8 ft 2 in)) extends from the scar to the Yeso River and downstream. Marmolejo rises above an altitude of about 4,000 metres (13,000 ft), covers an area of about 275 square kilometres (106 sq mi) and has a volume of about 95 cubic kilometres (23 cu mi), making it the largest volcano in the region. A 5,100 metres (16,700 ft) high saddle connects Marmolejo to the active volcano San José to the south, which in part overlies Marmolejo rocks; sometimes both volcanoes are considered together.

=== Glaciers and hydrology ===
Marmolejo is covered by glaciers and rock glaciers in its upper and lower sectors, respectively; glaciers extend over an altitude range of 3,500–6,000 metres (11,500–19,700 ft). Ice cover is more widespread on the eastern side of the mountain, covering nearly the entirety of the flanks there. The Arroyo Barroso glacier on the eastern flank in 1998 was about 10 kilometres (6.2 mi) long. The combined (with San José) ice cover reached about 100 square kilometres (39 sq mi) in 1956, while in 1986 an area of 22.3 square kilometres (8.6 sq mi) was glaciated. Glacier retreat since then has been rather slow, with 2013 ice still covering about 21.1 square kilometres (8.1 sq mi), owing to the modest temperature increase in the area. Some glaciers have been observed to surge, one of the Marmolejo glaciers advanced by 1 kilometre (0.62 mi) between 1962 and 1976.

The eastern side of the volcano drains into the Salinillas and Tunuyan River. The northwestern slopes drain through the Estero del Plomo (which begins in the amphitheatre) into the Yeso River and the southwestern through the Estero Colina into the Volcán River; both eventually converge into the Maipo River southeast of Santiago de Chile. There are several reservoirs in the area, such as the Yeso Reservoir; they are an important source of water for Chile's Metropolitan Region. On the Argentine side, the volcano is within the Reserva Provincial de Uso Múltiple y Recreativa Natural Manzano - Portillo de Piuquenes protected area.

== Geology ==
Off the western coast of South America, the Nazca Plate subducts beneath the South American Plate at a rate of 7–9 centimetres per year (2.8–3.5 in/year). It leads to volcanism in the Andean Volcanic Belt, which is subdivided into four volcanic zones: The Northern Volcanic Zone, the Central Volcanic Zone, the Southern Volcanic Zone and the Austral Volcanic Zone; Marmolejo and its neighbours are part of the so-called northern Southern Volcanic Zone, which consists of Tupungato-Tupungatito, Marmolejo-San José and Maipo-Diamante. They are a potential threat to the millions of people living in Chile's Metropolitan Region (particular hazards are mudflows produced by melting ice) but especially the older volcanoes are poorly studied.

Marmolejo produced mostly andesite and trachyandesite, the occurrence of dacite has also been reported. They define a potassium-rich calc-alkaline rock suite. Phenocrysts include augite, hematite, hornblende,hypersthene, iron-titanium oxides, magnetite, olivine and plagioclase. The geochemistry of Marmolejo rocks indicates that they developed within a complex magmatic system within the crust and that crustal rock assimilation played a role in their genesis. Rocks frequently bear trace of hydrothermal alteration.

=== Geologic history ===
There are two clusters of post-Miocene volcanism east of Santiago de Chile, a northern group Tupungato-Tupungatito-Nevado Sin Nombre-Cerro Alto-Nevado Piquenes and a southern group Marmolejo-San Jose. The rocks in the region are otherwise dominated by Mesozoic rocks of alternating marine (Río Colina and Lo Valdés Formations) and continental (Río Damas and Colimapu Formations) origin of the Aconcagua fold and thrust belt. Numerous thrust faults cross the terrain north and west of Marmolejo, running mostly in north-south direction, and one or two traverse the volcano itself.

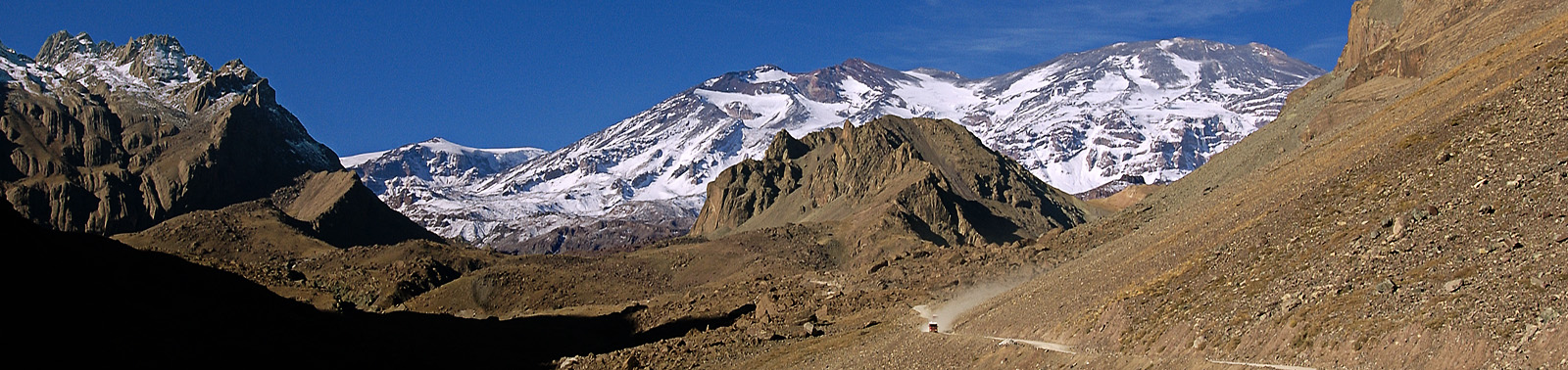
San José volcanic complex. From left to right: Marmolejo, La Engorda and San José.

The volcano is part of the older post-Miocene volcanic unit; it was active during the Pliocene and Pleistocene and underwent a first collapse to the northwest, yielding a 15 cubic kilometres (3.6 cu mi) debris avalanche there. The southern cones might have formed during the Holocene. Later, Espíritu Santo volcano developed on its southern flank and erupted into the Holocene, while San José was active into historical times. There is no evidence of historical activity at Marmolejo.

At some point within the last 2,500 years, the northwestern flank of Marmolejo failed again probably during an earthquake on one of the numerous faults in the area. The 0.26 cubic kilometres (0.062 cu mi) rock mass dropped 3,475 metres (11,401 ft) and formed a debris avalanche which travelled more than 20 kilometres (12 mi); such high mobility is typical for volcanic debris avalanches. As it descended the mountain, the debris underwent a transformation into a more mobile flow, leading to a two-part structure of the deposit. The debris avalanche deposit was originally interpreted as a moraine.

== See also ==
- List of volcanoes in Argentina
- List of volcanoes in Chile
