= Espíritu Santo (volcano) =

Mountain in Argentina

Volcán Espíritu Santo
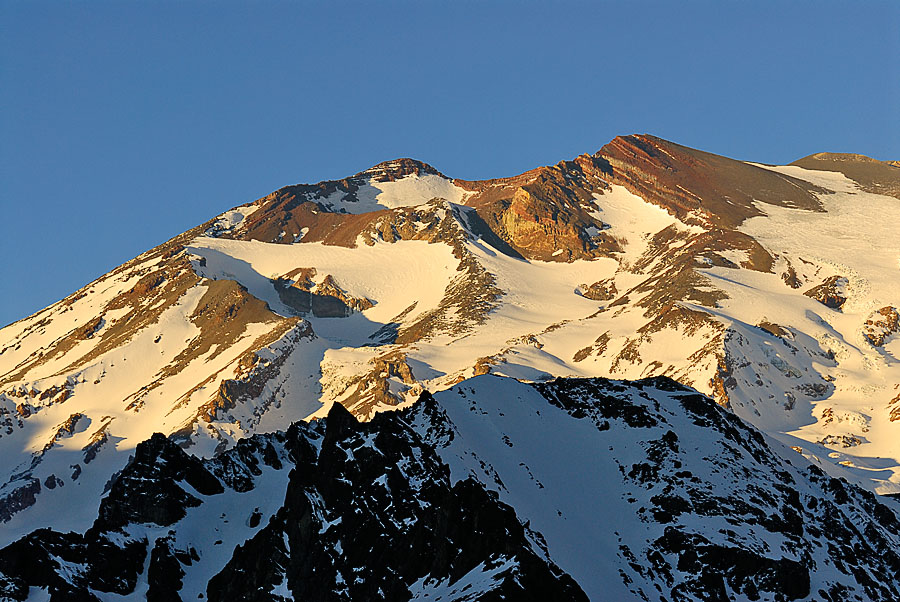
- The summit crater of Espiritu Santo overlies the La Engorda volcano.

Highest point
- Elevation: 5,692 m (18,675 ft)
- Coordinates: 33°46.192′S 69°55.829′W

Geography
- Location: Argentina-Chile
- Parent range: Principal Cordillera, Andes

Geology
- Rock age: Pleistocene
- Mountain type: Stratovolcano

Volcán Espíritu Santo is a Pleistocene stratovolcano at the center of the San José volcanic group, located at 90 km (56 mi) from Santiago de Chile at the end of the Cajón del Maipo on the Chile-Argentina border. The 1,000 m (3,281 ft)-wide summit crater of Espíritu Santo volcano overlaps the southern slope of the Marmolejo volcano and partially overlies La Engorda. The San José complex includes - a part of Espíritu Santo, La Engorda and San José - the Plantat and Marmolejo volcanoes, the latter of which is the highest (6,108 m (20,039 ft)) and located on the North-end of the group.

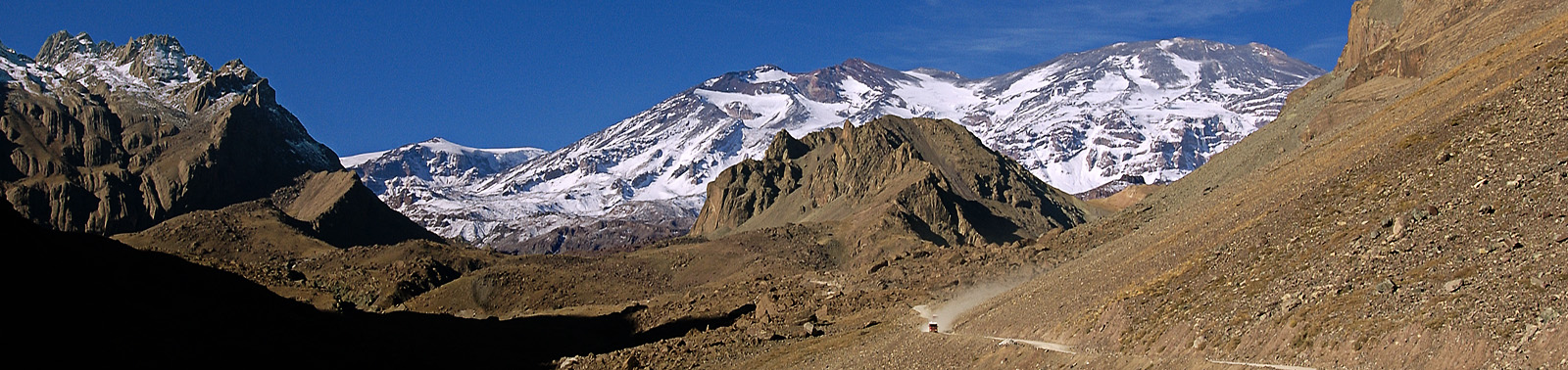
San José volcanic complex. FLTR: Marmolejo, La Engorda and San José.

== See also ==
- List of volcanoes in Argentina
- List of volcanoes in Chile
- San José (volcano)
- Marmolejo
