= Jürgen Stock (astronomer) =

German astronomer (1923–2004)

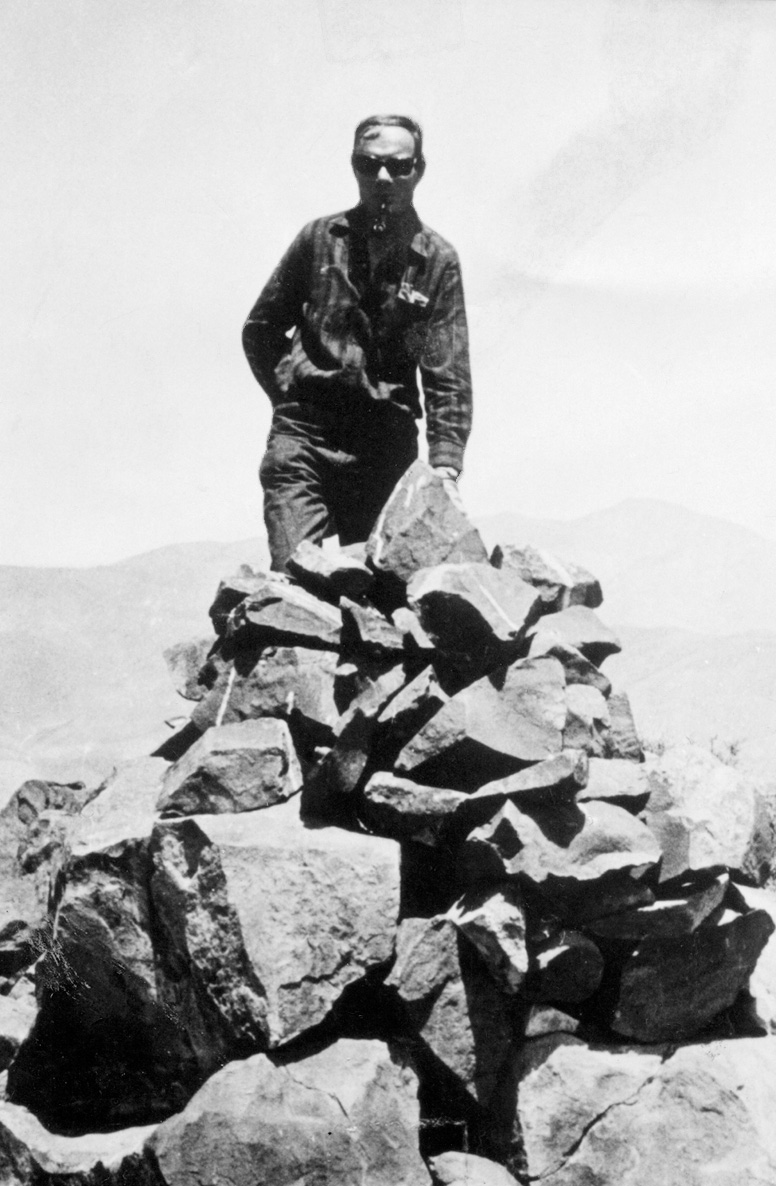
- Jürgen Stock during site testing in Chile (around 1962)
- Born: Jürgen Stock; 8 July 1923; Hamburg
- Died: 19 March 2004 (aged 80); Mérida, Venezuela
- Education: University of Hamburg
- Occupations: Astronomer; planetary scientist
- Known for: identifying the site of the Cerro Tololo Inter-American Observatory
- Spouse: Silvia Leyton
- Scientific career
- Fields: Astronomy
- Thesis: (1951)
- Doctoral advisor: Otto Heckmann

Jürgen Stock (8 July 1923 – 19 March 2004) was a German astronomer, best known for discovering the site of the Cerro Tololo Inter-American Observatory in Chile after a two year search starting in 1960, and was its first director from 1962 to 1965. Stock was bilingual, studied at the University of Hamburg and graduated under Otto Heckmann. In the 1950s he worked at Case-Western Reserve University and Boyden Observatory in South Africa, which uniquely linked him to scientific initiatives in both the northern and southern hemisphere. In 1971, he established the Llano del Hato National Astronomical Observatory, the Venezuelan National Observatory, of which he was a temporary director. The asteroid 4388 Jürgenstock was named after him.

== Early life and education ==
Jürgen Stock was born in Hamburg on 8 July 1923. His father owned an import business and the family moved to Mexico City in 1925. While German was his native language, he was exposed to Spanish until his return to Germany in 1929 when he was six. He attended Gymnasium in Hamburg.

Stock was not allowed to attend university during the NS regime, because he could not prove his non-Jewish ancestry. During World War II, he was drafted into the German army and during the last year fought on the Russian front. After the war he studied at the University of Hamburg. In 1951, he graduated under Otto Heckmann as his Ph.D. thesis advisor.

== Career ==
In 1954, Stock accepted a two-year scientific project in Cleveland, becoming an expert at photometry, after which he returned to Hamburg. In 1956, Heckmann assigned him to the Boyden Observatory in South Africa for a year. There, European astronomers were evaluating possible sites for the construction of an observatory. Stock would have collaborated with them in this task, gaining experience in site testing.

In 1958, Stock moved to Cleveland again joining the astronomical faculty of the Case Institute of Technology (now Case-Western Reserve University). He came into contact with Gerard P. Kuiper, professor at the University of Chicago, directing the Yerkes Observatory and McDonald Observatories, following a book chapter that Kuiper was coordinating. Kuiper learned of Stock’s ideas regarding the evaluation of astronomical sites. Kuiper offered him to take over the preliminary study, and Stock traveled to Chile, first briefly, in 1959.

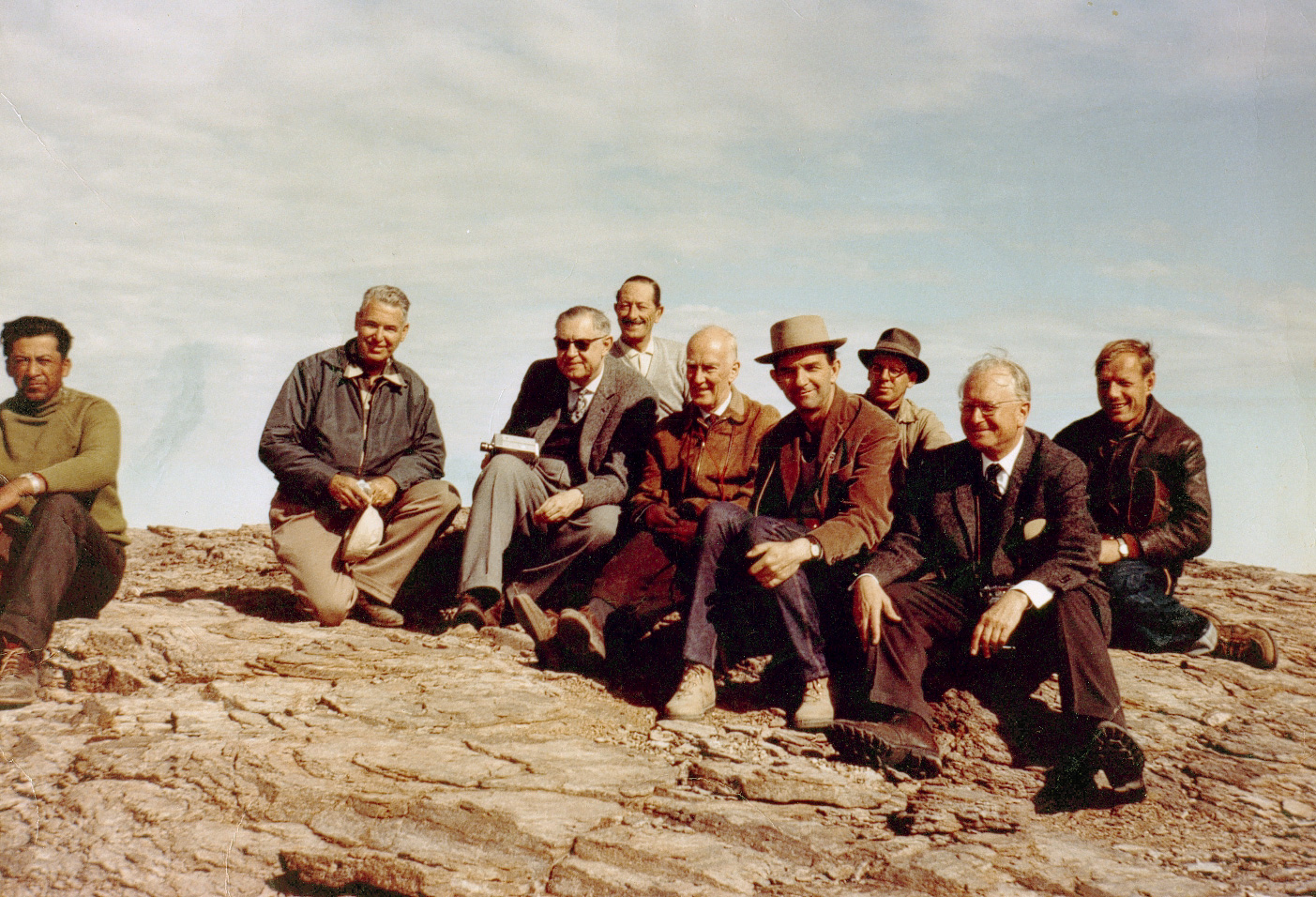
On June 8-10, 1963, ESO officials were the guests of AURA and on June 10 gathered on Cerro El Morado to discuss ESO prospects in Chile. In this photograph we see, from left to right: Arturo Garrote, Nicholas U. Mayall, H. Siedentopf, Marchetti (Architekt), Jan H. Oort, Ch. Fehrenbach, André Muller, Otto Heckmann & Jürgen Stock.

Between 1960 and 1961, Stock spent the largest part of time in the mountains of Coquimbo Region with the task of choosing the place where one could build an observatory. He kept an almost daily record of his work in Chile and sent reports about his search at regular intervals to Kuiper and later to Donald Shane, President of the Association of Universities for Research in Astronomy (AURA). Shane decided to circulate these reports, without Stock knowing it until years later. In addition to detailing the scientific specifications of the task the Stock site survey reports contain information about his daily experiences during the site survey: relationships with people, logistical difficulties, impressions on the construction of vehicles and their spare parts, animals, droughts, etc. In 1962, the final site was selected on Cerro Tololo. Stock was appointed director, construction began in 1963 and regular astronomical observations commenced at the Cerro Tololo Inter-American Observatory in 1965. Stock did not manage to preside over its inauguration, as he left in 1967, when Víctor Blanco, a Puerto Rican astronomer, took over. Stock continued to work for the National Astronomical Observatory (Chile) and the University of Chile, but ended partnership with AURA for "political differences". Stock moved to the University of Santiago where he taught and researched until 1971. After Salvador Allende was elected as Chilean president, all foreigners working at universities were checked and in the meantime were not paid. Stock went to Mexico and for some time helped Mexican colleagues in the search for suitable locations for telescopes.

In 1971, the Venezuelan government appointed Stock the first director of Centro de Investigaciones de Astronomia, the Llano del Hato National Astronomical Observatory, the Venezuelan National Observatory in the state of Mérida. The government had purchased material for a national observatory. He supervised the installation of the 1.5m Schmidt telescope, a reflector, and an astrograph, moving altogether 500 tons of telescopes and domes from Caracas onto a 3,600m mountain peak in the Andes. He remained director until his retirement in 1983.

One of his last projects was spectral classification made from tracings of objective prism spectra with only about half the size of the accidental errors in absolute magnitude as the MK classification can achieve. The observations consisted of objective-prism spectra of stars obtained with a CCD and the Schmidt Telescope of CIDA.

== Personal life and death ==
Stock was married to Silvia Leyton of Vicuña, Chile. They had five children. His eldest daughter Jeanette Stock is Professor of Astronomy at the Universidad de Zulia in Maracaibo, Venezuela. Stock remained in Venezuela until his death on 19 March 2004.

== Work ==
- Upgren, Arthur R.; Stock, Jurgen (2000). Weather: how it works and why it matters. Reading, Mass. Oxford: Perseus. ISBN 978-0-7382-0521-2.

== Legacy ==
"Without Jürgen Stock, the astronomical landscape on this planet would look completely different. Within one decade, Jurgen Stock made Chile the most important country for optical observatories."
