= 1761 Edmondson =

Main-belt asteroid

Discovery
- Discovered by: Indiana University (Indiana Asteroid Program)
- Discovery site: Goethe Link Obs.
- Discovery date: 30 March 1952

Designations
- Named after: Frank Edmondson (American astronomer)
- Alternative designations: 1952 FN · 1940 BC; 1950 XP · 1952 HT; 1955 US · 1969 JK; 1978 WY
- Minor planet category: main-belt · background

Orbital characteristics
- Epoch 4 September 2017 (JD 2458000.5)
- Uncertainty parameter 0
- Observation arc: 64.74 yr (23,646 days)
- Aphelion: 3.9145 AU
- Perihelion: 2.4388 AU
- Semi-major axis: 3.1766 AU
- Eccentricity: 0.2323
- Orbital period (sidereal): 5.66 yr (2,068 days)
- Mean anomaly: 282.49°
- Mean motion: 0° 10^{m} 26.76^{s} / day
- Inclination: 2.4636°
- Longitude of ascending node: 76.988°
- Argument of perihelion: 49.903°

Physical characteristics
- Dimensions: 20.51 km (calculated); 21.94±0.94 km
- Synodic rotation period: 4.208±0.002 h
- Geometric albedo: 0.08 (assumed); 0.102±0.009
- Spectral type: C
- Absolute magnitude (H): 11.40 · 11.8 · 12.06±0.33

1761 Edmondson, provisional designation 1952 FN, is a dark background asteroid from the outer regions of the asteroid belt, approximately 21 kilometers in diameter. It was discovered on 30 March 1952, by the Indiana Asteroid Program at Goethe Link Observatory, United States. It was named after astronomer Frank Edmondson.

== Orbit and classification ==
Edmondson is a background asteroid, located near the region occupied by the Themis family, a dynamical family of outer-belt asteroids with nearly coplanar ecliptical orbits. It orbits the Sun in the outer main-belt at a distance of 2.4–3.9 AU once every 5 years and 8 months (2,068 days). Its orbit has an eccentricity of 0.23 and an inclination of 2° with respect to the ecliptic.

It was first identified as 1940 BC at Konkoly Observatory in 1940. The body's observation arc begins with its identification as 1950 XP at McDonald Observatory in 1950, or 2 years prior to its official discovery observation at Goethe Link.

== Physical characteristics ==
Edmondson has been characterized as a carbonaceous C-type asteroid.

=== Rotation period ===
In November 2012, a rotational lightcurve of Edmondson was obtained from photometric observations at the Etscorn Campus Observatory (719) in New Mexico, United States. Lightcurve analysis gave a well-defined rotation period of 4.208 hours with a brightness variation of 0.29 magnitude (U=3).

=== Diameter and albedo ===
According to the surveys carried out by the Japanese Akari satellite, Edmondson measures 21.94 kilometers in diameter and its surface has an albedo of 0.102, while the Collaborative Asteroid Lightcurve Link assumes a more typical albedo for carbonaceous asteroids of 0.08 and calculates a diameter of 20.51 kilometers with an absolute magnitude of 11.8.

== Naming ==
This minor planet was named for astronomer Frank K. Edmondson (1912–2008) of Indiana University, the program's founder and director. The official naming citation was published by the Minor Planet Center on 20 February 1971 (M.P.C. 3143).
