= San Francisco Glacier =

Glacier in Chile

Coordinates: 33°46′14.59″S 70°04′16.09″W

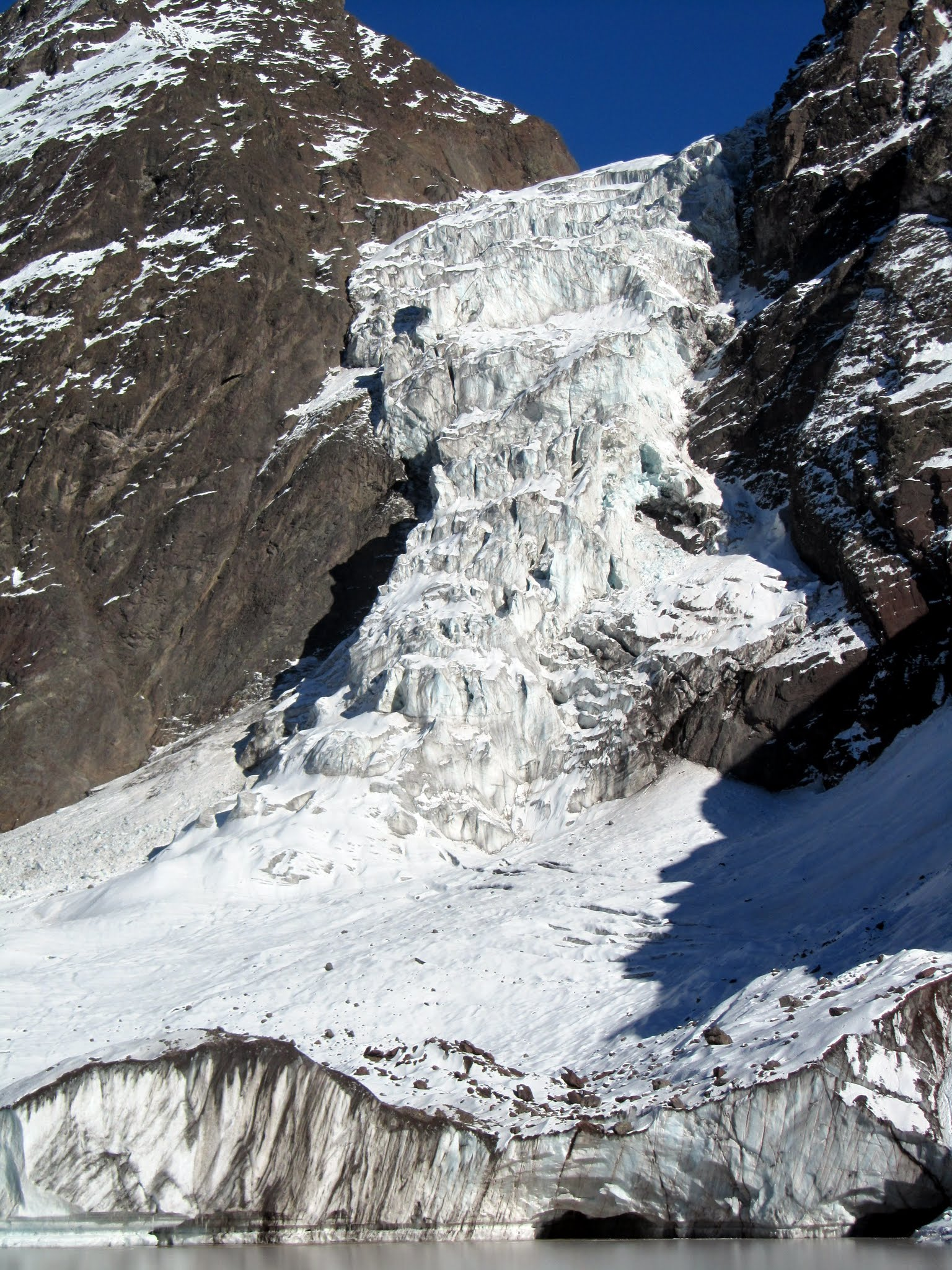
San Francisco Glacier.

The San Francisco Glacier is a glacier in Monumento Natural El Morado Natural Park a hundred kilometers away from Santiago, Chile. It is a tourist attraction.

The San Francisco Glacier is a temperate, mountain glacier that has hard-to-observe characteristics due to its being covered in debris. This glacier spans from elevations of 2,200 m to 3,400+ m above sea level. A ~3,000 hectare protected area surrounds the San Francisco Glacier, overviewed by Chile's National Forestry Corporation (CONAF).

== Retreat ==
The glacier's retreat over the past few decades has been significant, much like other glaciers in the surrounding area. A large contributor to glacial retreat has been Black Carbon, which is produced as a biproduct from copper and lithium mining. Approximately 49% of retreat in the area has been explained by black carbon particulates.

In 2010, many glaciers in Chile suffered from large amounts of retreat due to the Chilean Water Crisis (aka the Megadrought), including the San Francisco Glacier. This period of low water availability led to glacial shrinking up until ~2020.

== Conservation ==
The San Francisco Glacier has been classified as a natural monument by the Ministry of National Assets of Chile as of December 28th, 1994. This was done to protect the glacier due to it being as risk of high melting. The Cajón del Maipo Basin, in which the San Francisco Glacier lies, accounts for up to 59% of total glacial melt discharge to the capital city Santiago. This glacial melt is useful to Santiago, but has dwindled in recent years, with the level of ablation not being offset by new snowfall.

Many endemic species of Chile are being impacted by the loss of high-elevation ice and snow fall cover such as the Andean Condor (Vultur Gryphus) which are having their foraging grounds changed by shifting vegetation zones.
