= El Yeso Dam =

Reservoir located in the Santiago Metropolitan Region, Chile

El Yeso
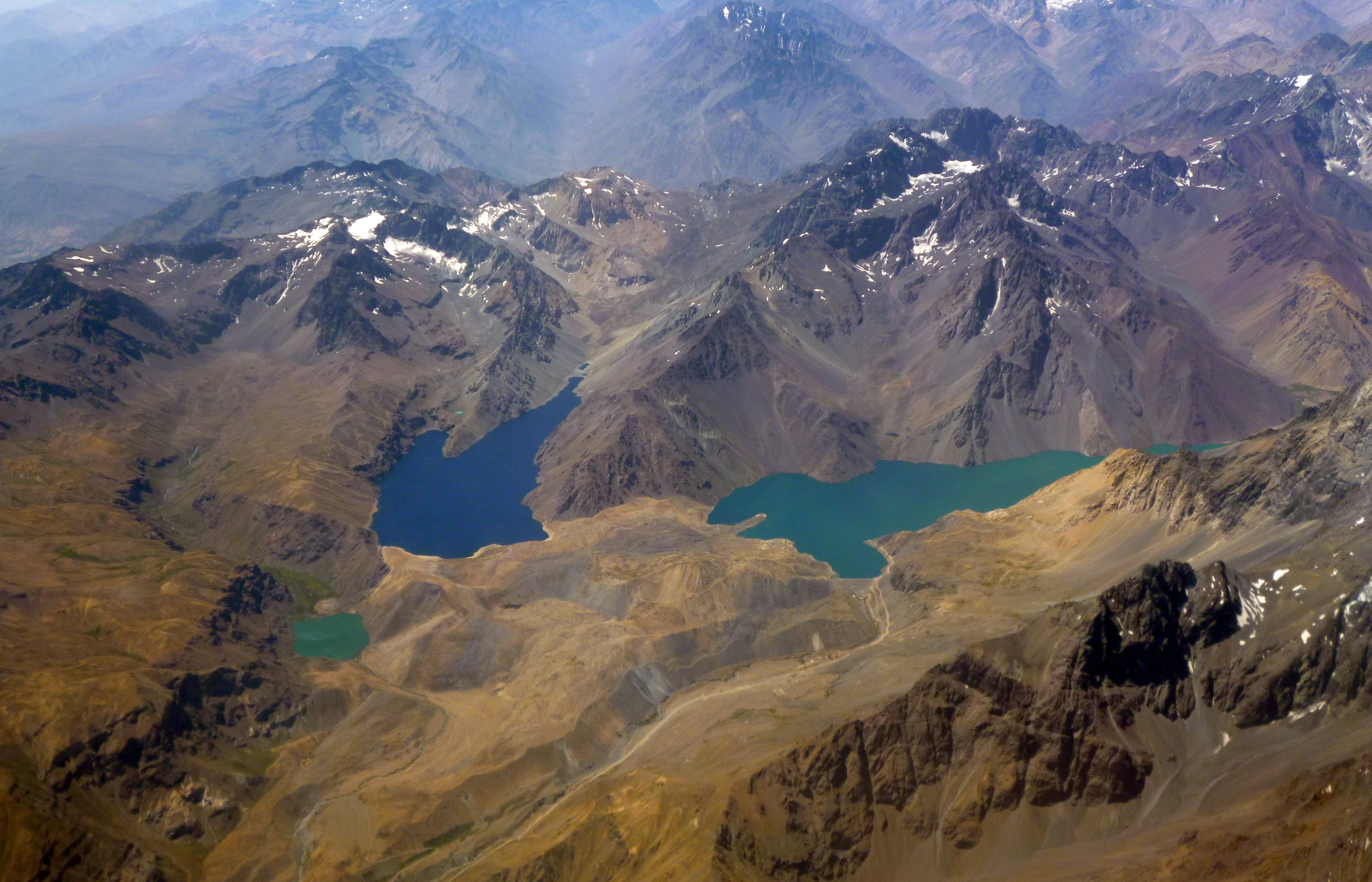
- Aerial view of El Yeso (right) and Laguna Negra during the summer.

- Location within Chile
- Coordinates: 33°39′S 70°04′W
- Type: reservoir
- Primary inflows: Yeso River
- Primary outflows: Yeso River
- Basin countries: Chile
- Surface elevation: 2,568 m (8,425 ft)

El Yeso is a reservoir located in the Andes, in the Santiago Metropolitan Region, Chile. It was formed by the damming of the Yeso River, part of the Maipo river basin. The reservoir has a capacity of 250,000,000 m³ and was completed in 1964.

El Yeso reservoir, along with the nearby Laguna Negra, is a major source of drinking water for Santiago.

Its water has a turquoise hue and is suitable for fishing and windsurfing.

Less than 2 kilometers drive, is "Refugios del Yeso", a shelter built in the 1950s to house workers during the construction of the same reservoir. In the Beagle Conflict, it was used by the Chilean Army, given its strategic value (it protects the source of drinking water in the capital, and at the same time can defend the capital against the Argentine advance, artillery being necessary).
