= 1650 Heckmann =

Main-belt asteroid

Discovery
- Discovered by: K. Reinmuth
- Discovery site: Heidelberg Obs.
- Discovery date: 11 October 1937

Designations
- Named after: Otto Heckmann (astronomer)
- Alternative designations: 1937 TG · 1929 SK; 1940 NB · 1941 UA_{1} 1943 DG · 1944 OC; 1947 FA · 1951 GX; 1952 SL_{1} · 1963 PB; A906 OC · A909 DF
- Minor planet category: main-belt · Nysa–Polana complex

Orbital characteristics
- Epoch 4 September 2017 (JD 2458000.5)
- Uncertainty parameter 0
- Observation arc: 110.26 yr (40,273 days)
- Aphelion: 2.8319 AU
- Perihelion: 2.0396 AU
- Semi-major axis: 2.4358 AU
- Eccentricity: 0.1626
- Orbital period (sidereal): 3.80 yr (1,389 days)
- Mean anomaly: 117.54°
- Mean motion: 0° 15^{m} 33.48^{s} / day
- Inclination: 2.7500°
- Longitude of ascending node: 199.76°
- Argument of perihelion: 56.942°

Physical characteristics
- Dimensions: 24.93±6.53 km 26.69±6.13 km 29.07±1.4 km (IRAS:6); 30.202±0.297 km 35.15±1.66 km
- Synodic rotation period: 12.05±0.05 h 14.893±0.005 h 14.9042±0.0154 h
- Geometric albedo: 0.034±0.004; 0.046±0.007; 0.0497±0.005 (IRAS:6); 0.05±0.03; 0.06±0.03
- Spectral type: B–V = 0.638; U–B = 0.200; Tholen = F · F
- Absolute magnitude (H): 11.284±0.001 (R) · 11.40±0.25 · 11.56 · 11.61

1650 Heckmann, provisional designation 1937 TG, is an asteroid located in the inner region of the asteroid belt, approximately 29 kilometers in diameter. It was discovered on 11 October 1937, by German astronomer Karl Reinmuth at Heidelberg Observatory in southern Germany, and later named after astronomer Otto Heckmann.

== Classification and orbit ==
Heckmann is classified as an F-type asteroid in the Tholen classification scheme, meaning it has a dark, carbonaceous surface. It orbits the Sun in the inner main-belt at a distance of 2.0–2.8 AU once every 3 years and 10 months (1,389 days). Its orbit has an eccentricity of 0.16 and an inclination of 3° with respect to the ecliptic. Heckmann was first identified as A906 OC at the discovering observatory in 1906. Its first used observation was taken at Heidelberg in 1909, when it was identified as A909 DF, extending the body's observation arc by 28 years prior to its official discovery observation.

== Rotation period ==
French amateur astronomer René Roy obtained the first rotational lightcurve of Heckmann in September 2005. It gave a rotation period of 12.05 hours with a brightness variation of 0.06 in magnitude (U=2). A more refined lightcurve with a period of 14.893 hours and an amplitude of 0.16 magnitude was obtained by Australian amateur astronomer David Higgins at the Hunters Hill Observatory and collaborating stations in March 2008 (U=3). In September 2013, photometric observations at the Palomar Transient Factory, California, gave a low rated lightcurve with a similar period of 14.9042 hours (Δ 0.09 mag; U=1).

== Diameter and albedo ==
According to the surveys carried out by the Infrared Astronomical Satellite IRAS, the Japanese Akari satellite, and NASA's Wide-field Infrared Survey Explorer with its subsequent NEOWISE mission, Heckmann measures between 24.93 and 35.15 kilometers in diameter, and its surface has an albedo between 0.034 and 0.06. The Collaborative Asteroid Lightcurve Link agrees with the results obtained by IRAS, that is an albedo of 0.0497 and a diameter of 29.07 kilometers with an absolute magnitude of 11.56.

== Naming ==
This minor planet was named in honor of German astronomer Otto Heckmann (1901–1983), director of the Bergedorf Observatory in Hamburg, president of the International Astronomical Union (1967–1970) and the first director of ESO, the European Southern Observatory, which foundation had been initiated by him. He was active in the fields of cosmology and several aspects of fundamental astronomy. The official naming citation was published by the Minor Planet Center on 20 February 1976 (M.P.C. 3932).
