= Cerro El Morado =

Mountain in Chile

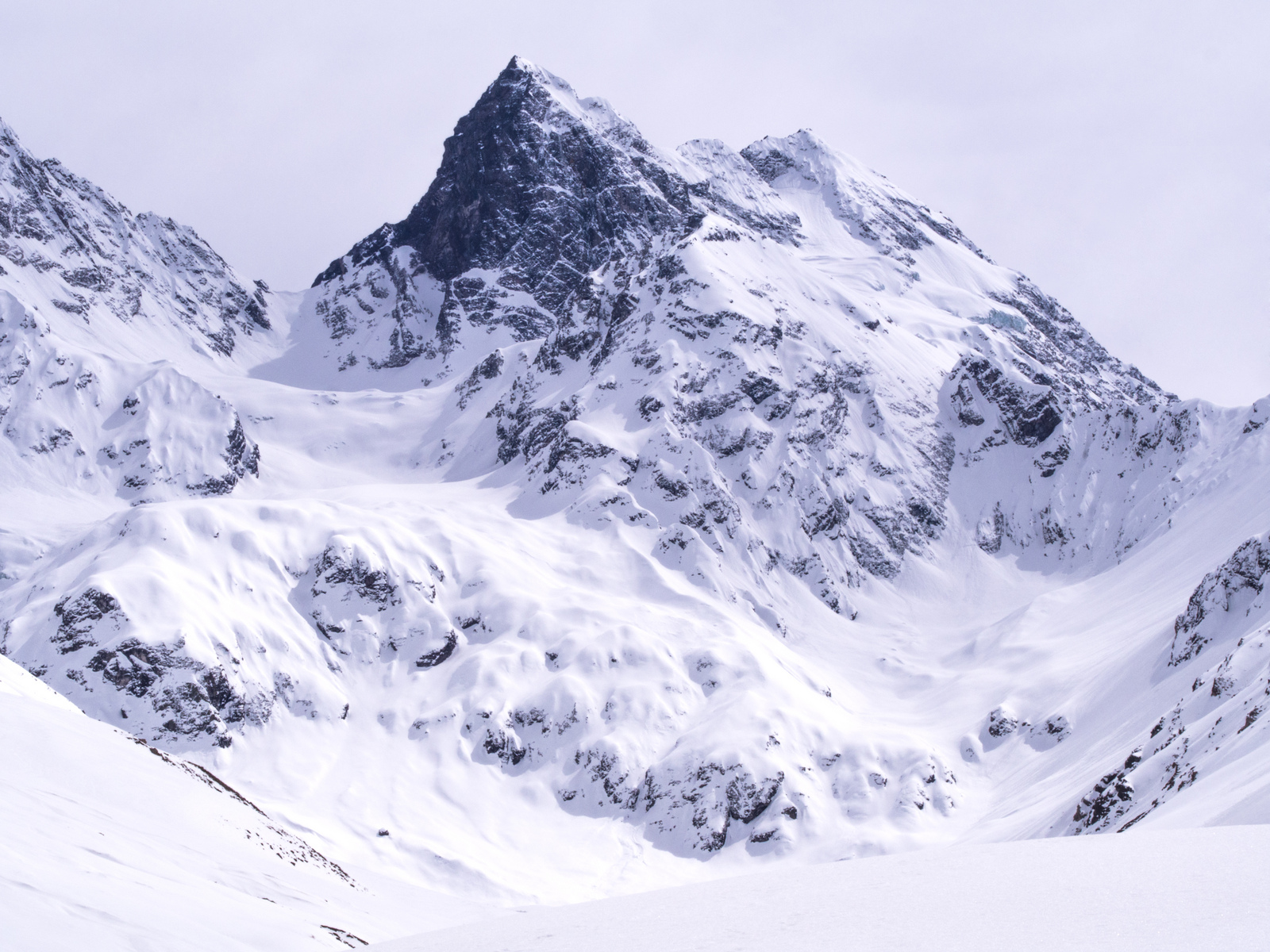
- El Morado mountain in winter

Highest point
- Elevation: 5,060 m (16,600 ft)
- Listing: List of mountains in Chile
- Coordinates: 33°43′48″S 70°03′50″W

Geography
- Location within Chile
- Country: Chile
- Region: Santiago Metropolitan Region
- Parent range: Andes

Cerro El Morado is a mountain in the Principal Cordillera of the Andes of Central Chile. It has a height of 5,060 metres (16,600 ft) and is located in the El Morado Natural Monument of the same name.

The area is the cirque of the San Francisco Glacier and belongs to the Volcán River basin. Cerro El Morado dominates the landscape of this reserve.

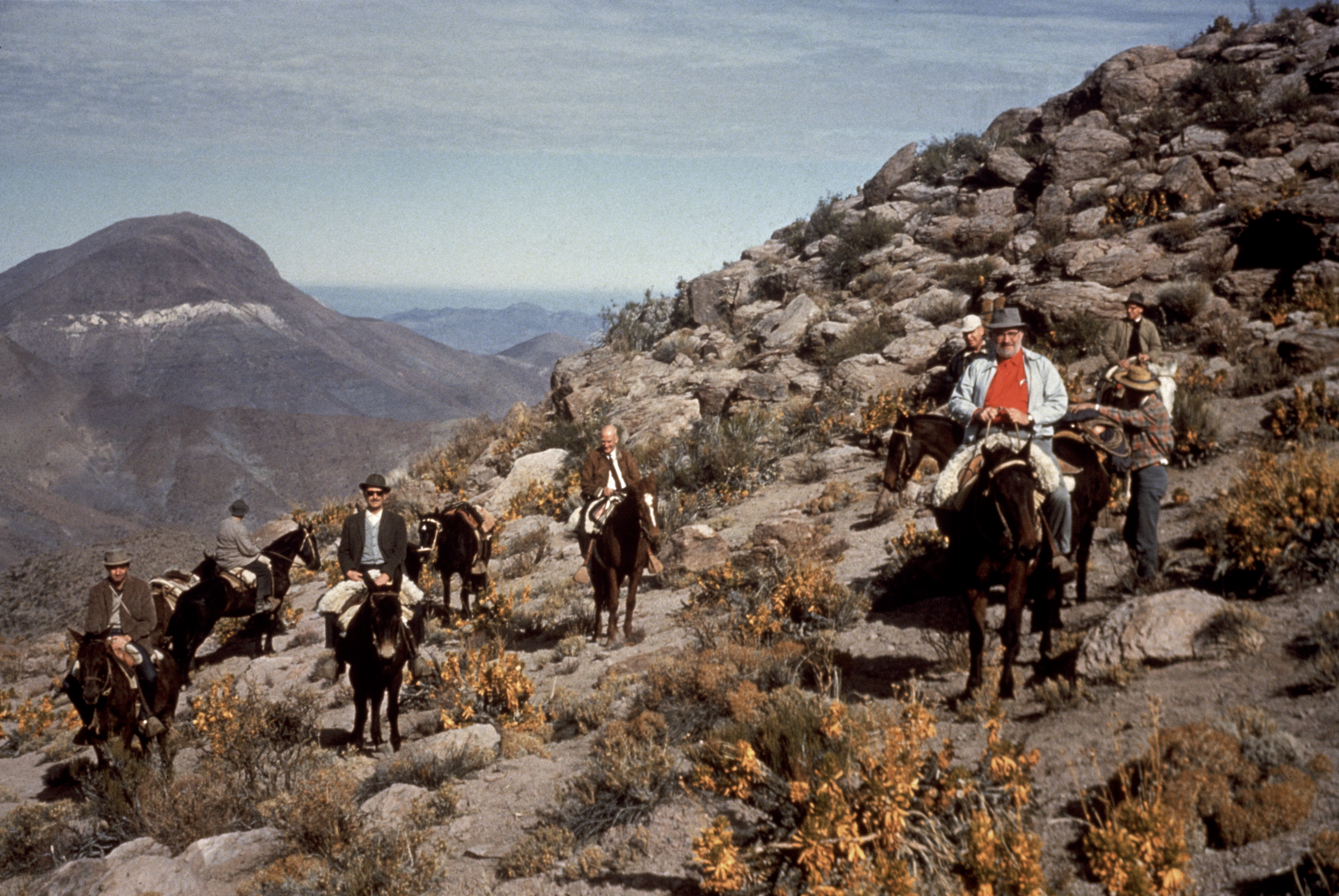
Dutch astronomy professor Jan Oort with international astronomy colleagues on horseback connoitering the Chilean mountains for a location where to establish the European Southern Observatory, Cerro El Morado, June 1963.

== See also ==
- List of mountains in the Andes
