= Cordillera Province =

Cordillera Province may refer to:

- Cordillera Province, Bolivia
- Cordillera Province, Chile

== See also ==
- Cordillera
