= Crust =

Crust may refer to:

== Common meanings ==
=== Food ===
- Crust (baking), the outer layer composed of pastry or salt
- Crust, the bread foundation of pizza
- Bread crust, the dense surface layer of bread

=== Physical sciences ===
- Crust (geology), the outer layer of a rocky planetary body
- Soil crust, the soil surface layer

== Arts, entertainment, and media ==
=== Music ===
- Crust (album), by Sadist, 1997
- Crust (band), an American band in the 1980s
- Crust (EP), by Sarcófago
- Crust punk, also known as crust, a music genre

=== Other uses in arts, entertainment, and media ===
- The Crust, a television series, aired until 2005 on BBC One

== Other uses ==
- Crust (dermatology)
- Crust fungi, another name for corticioid fungi
- Crust, a character in My Hero Academia

== See also ==
- Krusty the Clown, fictional character in The Simpsons television series
- Krusty Krab, fictional restaurant in SpongeBob SquarePants television series
- Upper crust (disambiguation)
