= San José (volcano) =

Volcano in the Andes mountains

Volcán San José
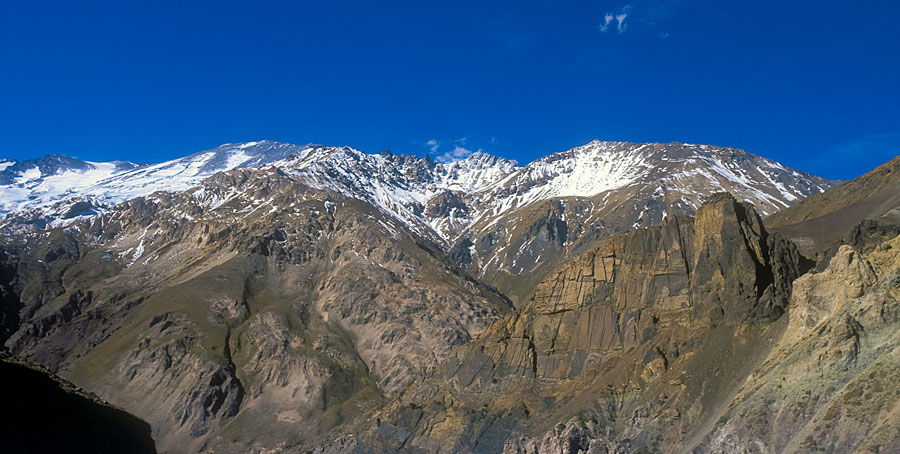
- The San Jose (right) and La Engorda (left) volcanoes seen from across Baños Morales, high up in the Cajón del Maipo canyon.

Highest point
- Elevation: 5,856 m (19,213 ft)
- Prominence: 747 m (2,451 ft)
- Coordinates: 33°47.185′S 69°53.920′W

Geography
- Location: Argentina / Chile
- Parent range: Principal Cordillera, Andes

Geology
- Mountain type: Stratovolcano
- Last eruption: 1960

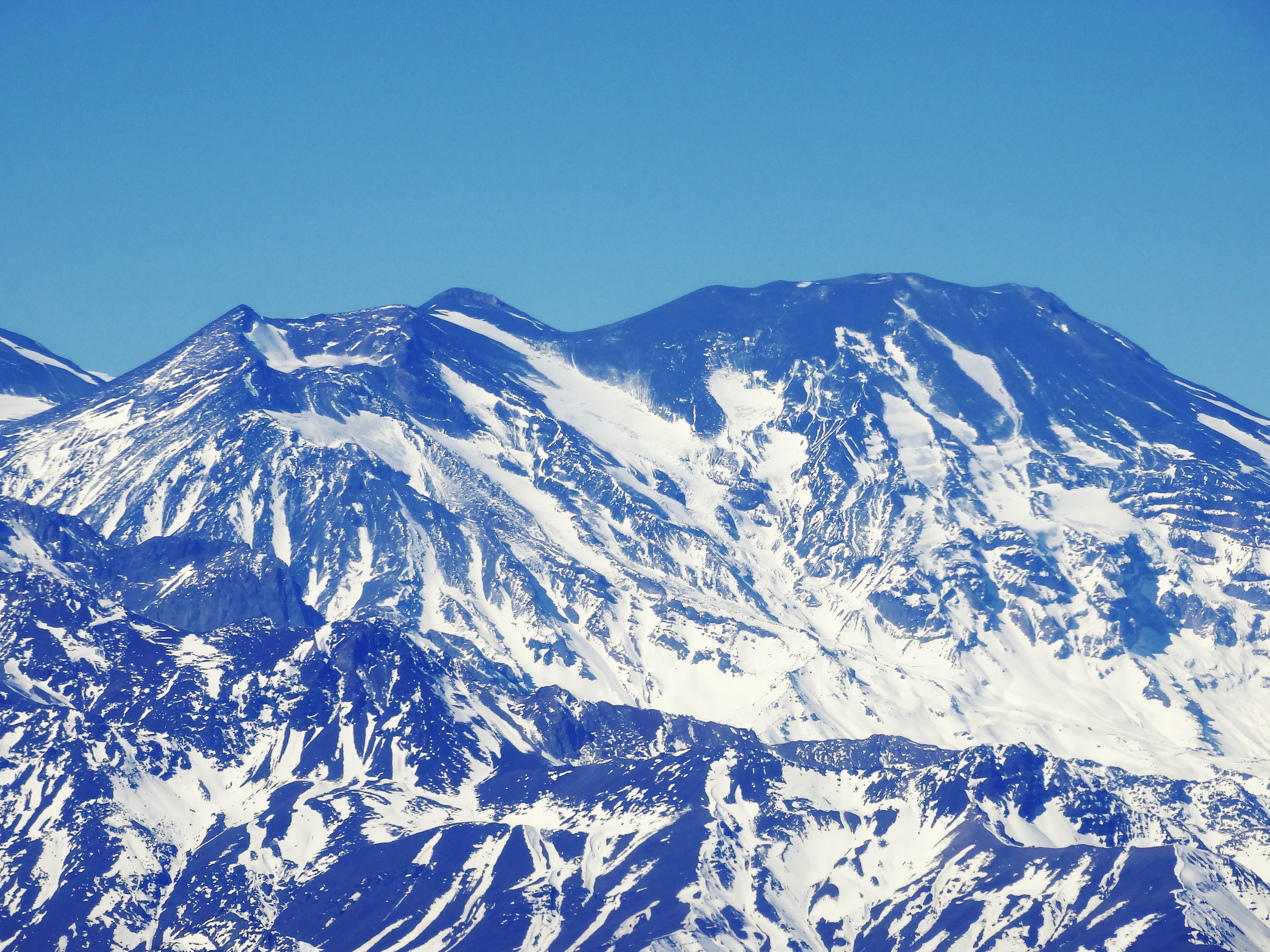
Volcano San Jose seen from air towards the east.

San José Volcano is the stratovolcano that gives its name to a massive volcanic group, at about 90 km (56 mi) from Santiago de Chile at the end of the Cajón del Maipo on the Chile-Argentina border. It lies on the south end of an approximately 10 km (6 mi) x 5 km (3 mi) complex that includes the La Engorda, Espiritu Santo, Plantat and Marmolejo volcanoes, the latter of which is located on the Northern end of the group.

== See also ==
- List of volcanoes in Argentina
- List of volcanoes in Chile
