= Charles Fehrenbach (astronomer) =

French astronomer (1914–2008)

Charles Marc Max Fehrenbach
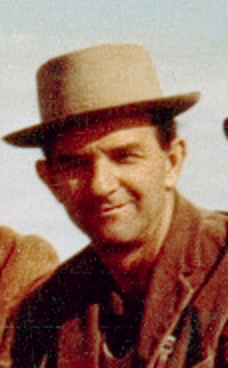
- Born: 29 April 1914; Strasbourg, France
- Died: 9 January 2008 (aged 93); Nîmes
- Education: University Paris

Charles Fehrenbach (born 29 April 1914 in Strasbourg; died 9 January 2008 in Nîmes) was a French astronomer and member of the French Academy of Sciences. He was director of the Observatoire de Haute Provence (OHP) until 1983. Following the Second World War, he was one of the first astronomers to pioneer the reversion method of using objective prisms to measure the Doppler shift of stars.

He was awarded the Lalande Prize in 1950, the Prix Jules Janssen in 1959, and the Karl Schwarzschild Medal in 1963. The minor planet 3433 Fehrenbach was named in his honor.
