= Yeso River =

Coordinates: 33°38′06″S 69°57′17″W

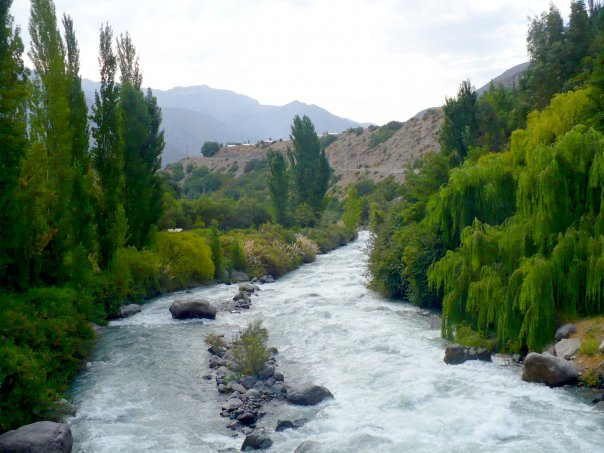

Location
- Country: Chile

Physical characteristics
- Length: 4 miles

The Yeso River is a river in Chile that runs 4 miles (~6km) and is one of the main tributaries of the Maipo River. Rapids for the Yeso River vary between Class IV and V and the river has many steep drops and narrow chutes. It serves as a source of water for Metropolitan Santiago.

== See also ==
- List of rivers of Chile
