= Volcán River =

River tributary to the Maipo River

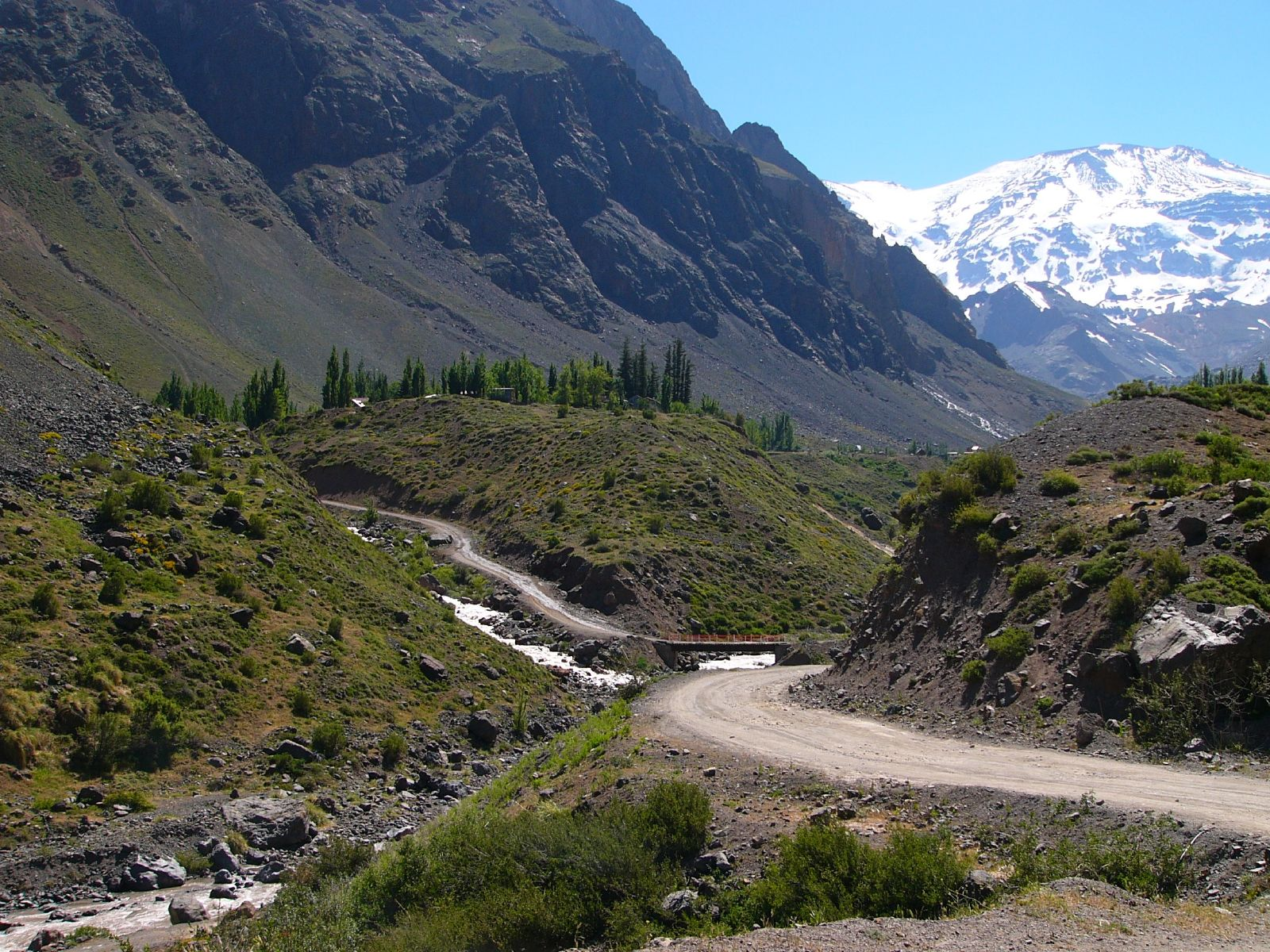
- San José Volcano looming in the distance.

Location
- Country: Chile

Physical characteristics
- Mouth
  - location: Maipo River
- Length: 54 km (34 mi)
- Basin size: 507 km^{2} (196 sq mi)

Volcán River is the river tributary to the Maipo River. Its course lies completely in the Andes of the Santiago Metropolitan Region. The river and its tributaries drain, among other areas, the Chilean slopes of San José Volcano and El Morado Natural Monument area.

== See also ==
- List of rivers of Chile
