= Maipo River =

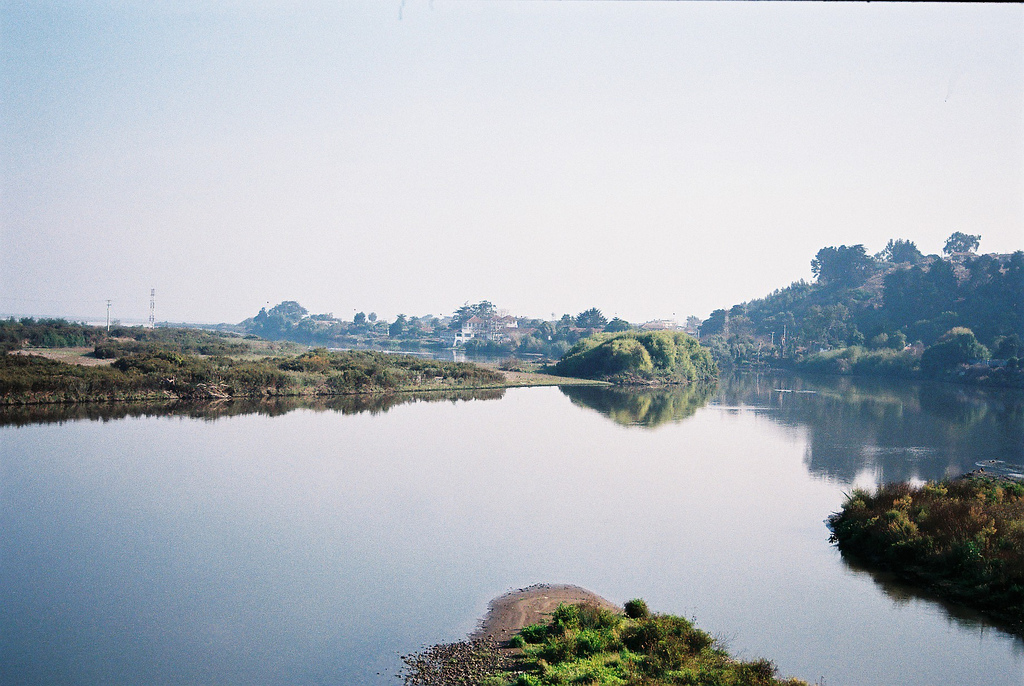

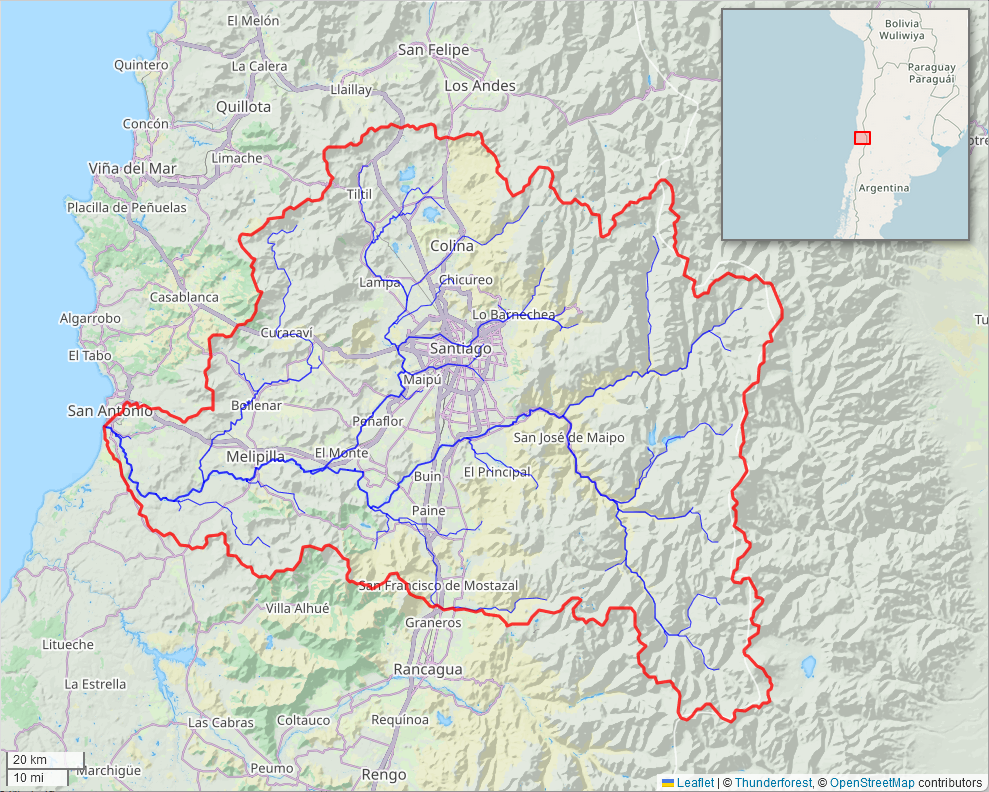
- Maipo River watershed (Interactive map)

Location
- Country: Chile

Physical characteristics
- Source
  - location: Andes Mountains, south of Unnamed Hill 3996
  - coordinates: 34.225°S 69.849°W
- Mouth: Pacific Ocean
  - location: San Antonio, Chile
  - coordinates: 33.6134°S 71.6288°W
- Length: 250 km (160 mi)
- Basin size: 15,304 km^{2} (5,909 sq mi)
- Discharge
  - average: 92.3 m^{3}/s (3,260 cu ft/s)

Basin features
- Tributaries
  - right: El Volcán, Yeso and Colorado

The Maipo River is the main river flowing through the Santiago Metropolitan Region and the Valparaíso Region of Chile. It is located just south of the capital of Santiago. The Mapocho River, which flows through central Santiago, is one of its tributaries. Its headwaters are on the west slope of Maipo volcano, in the Andes. The Maipo River is by far the major source of irrigation and potable water for the region.

The river's mouth bar have moved to disconnect the river from the sea several times in history, for example, after the 2010 Chile earthquake and then again since January 19, 2023. This last change in bar morphology was a consequence of a storm surge. By January 28 a ditch had been made to reconnect the river to the sea. Governor of Valparaíso Region Rodrigo Mundaca criticized however the fact that works were carried out without permission.

Low discharge rates caused by excessive uptakes of water in Maipo River have been credited for the inability of the river to break naturally through the bar in January 2023.

== Course ==
In its upper course the river runs as an entrenched torrent through the Andes mountains. Here, it receives three major tributaries: the El Volcán River, the Yeso River and the Colorado River. After leaving the Andes, the Maipo flows through the valley that bears its name, which is one of the principal wine-producing region in Chile. The Maipo River travels 250 km (160 mi) before emptying into the Pacific Ocean, near the locality of Llolleo, south of the port of San Antonio.
