= Heinrich Siedentopf =

German astronomer

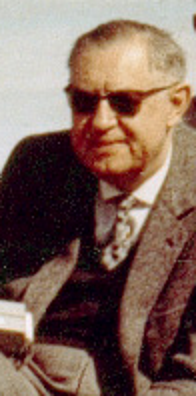
- Siedentopf 1963 in Chile
- Born: 1 December 1906; Hanover
- Died: 28 November 1963 (aged 56); Tübingen
- Alma mater: University of Göttingen
- Occupation: Astronomer, astrophysicist

Heinrich Friedrich Siedentopf (1 December 1906 – 28 November 1963) was a German astronomer and physicist.

== Life & work ==
He was born in Hanover. In 1930, he became an assistant to Heinrich Vogt, then joined the national observatory in Heidelberg. Between 1940–46 he was a professor of astronomy at the University of Jena, and director of the observatory. In 1949, he was a professor at the University of Tübingen, where he later died of a heart attack.

Professor Siedentopf published a total of 146 papers and a textbook. He studied cosmology, stellar convection, photometry and the zodiacal light. In 1934, he developed an adjustable iris for the Stetson-Schilt photometer, allowing the observer to adjust the light level directed at the astronomical plate.

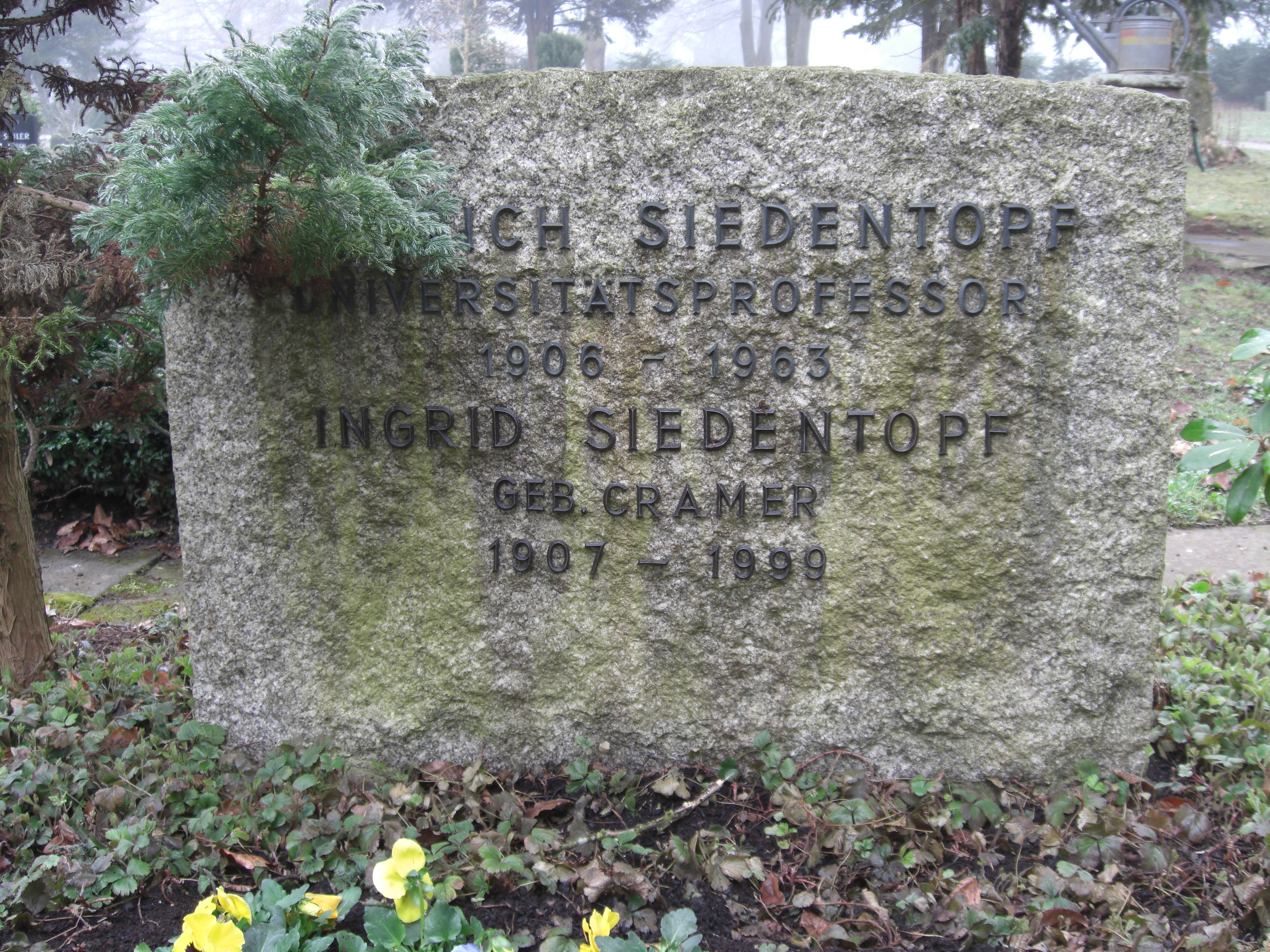
Gravesite of Siedentopf at the Bergfriedhof in Tübingen

Until his early death in 1963, Siedentopf played a key role in the foundation of the European Southern Observatory (ESO) in Chile.

Siedentopf crater on the Moon and the main belt asteroid 5375 Siedentopf were named after him.
