= 26858 Misterrogers =

Stony asteroid named after Fred Rogers

Discovery
- Discovered by: E. F. Helin
- Discovery site: Palomar Obs.
- Discovery date: March 21, 1993

Designations
- Pronunciation: /ˌmɪstər ˈrɒdʒərz/
- Named after: Fred Rogers (Mister Rogers' Neighborhood)
- Alternative designations: 1993 FR · 1952 SU; 2000 EK_{107}
- Minor planet category: Mars crosser

Orbital characteristics
- Epoch April 27, 2019 (JD 2458600.5)
- Uncertainty parameter 0
- Observation arc: 65.65 yr (23,980 d)
- Aphelion: 3.1490 AU
- Perihelion: 1.5384 AU
- Semi-major axis: 2.3437 AU
- Eccentricity: 0.3436
- Orbital period (sidereal): 3.59 yr (1,311 d)
- Mean anomaly: 164.80°
- Mean motion: 0° 16^{m} 28.92^{s} / day
- Inclination: 21.874°
- Longitude of ascending node: 203.76°
- Argument of perihelion: 247.63°
- Earth MOID: 0.6692 AU (261 LD)

Physical characteristics
- Mean diameter: 6.33±1.08 km 8.07±0.17 km 8.19±1.64 km
- Synodic rotation period: 8.066±0.007 h (Note: Skiff (2011) web: rotation period 8.066±0.007 hours with a brightness amplitude of 0.13 mag. Quality Code is 3. Summary figures at the LCDB.)
- Geometric albedo: 0.200; 0.208; 0.28
- Spectral type: S (assumed)
- Absolute magnitude (H): 12.80; 12.9

26858 Misterrogers (/ˌmɪstər ˈrɒdʒərz/), provisional designation 1993 FR, is a stony asteroid and sizable Mars-crosser on an eccentric orbit from the asteroid belt, approximately 5.1 miles (8.2 kilometers) in diameter. It was discovered on March 21, 1993, by American astronomer Eleanor Helin at the Palomar Observatory in California. The likely S-type asteroid has a rotation period of 8.0 hours. It was named after children's television host Fred Rogers.

== Orbit and classification ==
Misterrogers is a member of the Mars-crossing asteroids, a dynamically unstable group between the main belt and the near-Earth populations, crossing the orbit of Mars at 1.66 AU. It orbits the Sun at a distance of 1.5–3.1 AU once every 3 years and 7 months (1,311 days; semi-major axis of 2.34 AU). Its orbit has an eccentricity of 0.34 and an inclination of 22° with respect to the ecliptic.

The asteroid was first observed as 1952 SU at the Goethe Link Observatory in September 1952. The body's observation arc begins with a precovery published by the Digitized Sky Survey, taken at Palomar in May 1990, almost 3 years prior to its official discovery observation.

== Naming ==
This minor planet was named after Fred McFeely Rogers (1928–2003), who was the host of the children's television program Mister Rogers' Neighborhood for more than 30 years. The naming was proposed, and citation prepared, by Dr. John G. Radzilowicz, Director of the Henry Buhl, Jr. Planetarium & Observatory at the Kamin Science Center in Pittsburgh, Pennsylvania. The official naming citation was published by the Minor Planet Center on May 1, 2003 (M.P.C. 48396).

Rogers had a lifelong fascination with the sky and astronomy, obtained a pilot's license while still in high school and also produced with the Kamin Science Center a planetarium show called The Sky above Mister Rogers' Neighborhood, which is still shown at many planetaria across the United States.

== Physical characteristics ==
Misterrogers is an assumed, stony S-type asteroid. In line with the body's determined albedo (see below).

=== Rotation period ===
In April 2011, a rotational lightcurve of Misterrogers was obtained from photometric observations by Brian A. Skiff at Anderson Mesa Station. Lightcurve analysis gave a well-defined rotation period of 8.066±0.007 hours with a brightness variation of 0.13 magnitude (U=3). A low brightness amplitude is indicative for a spherical rather than elongated shape.

=== Diameter and albedo ===
According to the survey carried out by the NEOWISE mission of NASA's Wide-field Infrared Survey Explorer (WISE), Misterrogers measures 6.33 kilometers in diameter and its surface has an albedo of 0.28. However, a WISE-study dedicated to Mars-crossing asteroids in 2017 determined a larger diameter of 8.19 kilometers with an albedo of 0.20. The Japanese Akari satellite found a diameter of 8.07 km and an albedo of 0.208, while the Collaborative Asteroid Lightcurve Link assumes a standard albedo for a stony asteroid of 0.20 and calculates a diameter of 7.82 kilometers based on an absolute magnitude of 12.9.

==== Sizable Mars-crosser ====
With a diameter of 8.2 kilometers, Misterrogers is a sizable Mars-crosser of which two dozens or so are known (5–15 km). These include 3581 Alvarez (13.7 km) 1065 Amundsenia (9.8 km), 1139 Atami (9.4 km), 3737 Beckman (14.4 km), 1474 Beira (15.5 km), 5682 Beresford (7.3 km), 7505 Furusho (10.0 km) 7369 Gavrilin (5.5 km), 1011 Laodamia (7.4 km), 6170 Levasseur (5.7 km), 1727 Mette (5.4 km), 1131 Porzia (7.1 km), 985 Rosina (8.2 km), 1235 Schorria (5.6 km), 1310 Villigera (15.2 km), and 1468 Zomba (7 km), which are themselves smaller than the largest members of this dynamical group, namely, 132 Aethra, 323 Brucia (former Mars-crosser), 1508 Kemi, 2204 Lyyli and 512 Taurinensis, all larger than 20 kilometers.
