= 3198 Wallonia =

Asteroid

Discovery
- Discovered by: F. Dossin
- Discovery site: Haute-Provence Obs.
- Discovery date: 30 December 1981

Designations
- Pronunciation: /wəˈloʊniə/
- Named after: Wallonia (Belgian French Part)
- Alternative designations: 1981 YH_{1}
- Minor planet category: Mars-crosser

Orbital characteristics
- Epoch 23 March 2018 (JD 2458200.5)
- Uncertainty parameter 0
- Observation arc: 36.47 yr (13,322 d)
- Aphelion: 2.7007 AU
- Perihelion: 1.6615 AU
- Semi-major axis: 2.1811 AU
- Eccentricity: 0.2382
- Orbital period (sidereal): 3.22 yr (1,177 d)
- Mean anomaly: 74.225°
- Mean motion: 0° 18^{m} 21.6^{s} / day
- Inclination: 17.959°
- Longitude of ascending node: 83.572°
- Argument of perihelion: 40.630°

Physical characteristics
- Mean diameter: 7.13 km (calculated)
- Synodic rotation period: 7.54±0.01 h (Note: Lightcurve plot of 3198 Wallonia, Palmer Divide Observatory, B. D. Warner (2008). Rotation period 7.54±0.01 hours with a brightness amplitude of 0.57±0.02 mag. Quality code is 3. Summary figures for (3198) Wallonia at the LCDB.)
- Geometric albedo: 0.20 (assumed)
- Spectral type: SMASS = S Sqw (Bus–DeMeo); K (S3OS2)
- Absolute magnitude (H): 13.1

3198 Wallonia, provisional designation 1981 YH_{1}, is a stony asteroid and sizable Mars-crosser from the inner regions of the asteroid belt, approximately 7.1 kilometers (4.4 miles) in diameter. It was discovered on 30 December 1981, by Belgian astronomer François Dossin at the Haute-Provence Observatory in France. The S/K-type asteroid has a rotation period of 7.5 hours. It was named after the French speaking region of Wallonia in Belgium.

== Orbit and classification ==
Wallonia is a Mars-crossing asteroid, crossing the orbit of Mars at 1.666 AU. Members of this dynamically unstable group are located between the main belt and near-Earth populations. It orbits the Sun at a distance of 1.7–2.7 AU once every 3 years and 3 months (1,177 days; semi-major axis of 2.18 AU). Its orbit has an eccentricity of 0.24 and an inclination of 18° with respect to the ecliptic. The body's observation arc begins with its official discovery observation.

== Naming ==
This minor planet was named after Wallonia, the French speaking part of Belgium, where the discoverer was born and where the Institut d'Astrophysique et Géophysique at the University of Liège is located. The official naming citation was published by the Minor Planet Center on 22 June 1986 (M.P.C. 10848).

== Physical characteristics ==
In the SMASS classification, Wallonia is a common, stony S-type asteroid. In the Bus-DeMeo taxonomy it is a Svw-type, while In both the Tholen- and SMASS-like taxonomy of the Small Solar System Objects Spectroscopic Survey (S3OS2), Wallonia is a K-type asteroid.

=== Rotation period ===
In April 2008, a rotational lightcurve of Wallonia was obtained from photometric observations by Brian Warner at the Palmer Divide Observatory in Colorado, United States. Lightcurve analysis gave a rotation period of 7.54±0.01 hours with a brightness amplitude of 0.57 magnitude (U=3). French amateur astronomer René Roy determined a very similar period of 7.58±0.05 and an amplitude of 0.38 in April 2005 (U=2).

=== Diameter and albedo ===
The Collaborative Asteroid Lightcurve Link assumes a standard albedo for a stony asteroid of 0.20 and calculates a diameter of 7.13 kilometers based on an absolute magnitude of 13.1. A generic magnitude-to-diameter conversion for an albedo of 0.20 also gives a diameter of 7.1 kilometers.

This makes Wallonia one of the largest mid-sized Mars-crossing asteroids comparable with 1065 Amundsenia (9.75 km), 1139 Atami (9.35 km), 1474 Beira (14.9 km), 1727 Mette (5.44 km), 1131 Porzia (7.13 km), 1235 Schorria (5.55 km), 985 Rosina (8.18 km), 1310 Villigera (15.24 km) and 1468 Zomba (7 km), but far smaller than the largest members of this dynamical group, namely, 132 Aethra, 323 Brucia (former), 1508 Kemi, 2204 Lyyli and 512 Taurinensis, which are all larger than 20 kilometers in diameter.
