= 7505 Furusho =

Mars-crossing asteroid

Discovery
- Discovered by: T. Kobayashi
- Discovery site: Ōizumi Obs.
- Discovery date: 3 January 1997

Designations
- Named after: Reiko Furusho (Japanese astronomer)
- Alternative designations: 1997 AM_{2} · 1940 WC; 1944 OG · 1950 BA_{1} 1970 WG · 1991 NS
- Minor planet category: Mars-crosser

Orbital characteristics
- Epoch 27 April 2019 (JD 2458600.5)
- Uncertainty parameter 0
- Observation arc: 77.37 yr (28,258 d)
- Aphelion: 3.6410 AU
- Perihelion: 1.6305 AU
- Semi-major axis: 2.6357 AU
- Eccentricity: 0.3814
- Orbital period (sidereal): 4.28 yr (1,563 d)
- Mean anomaly: 132.46°
- Mean motion: 0° 13^{m} 49.08^{s} / day
- Inclination: 6.3771°
- Longitude of ascending node: 86.492°
- Argument of perihelion: 288.02°
- Earth MOID: 0.645 AU (251 LD)
- Mars MOID: 0.2486 AU

Physical characteristics
- Mean diameter: 9.07±0.7 km 10.04±1.00 km
- Synodic rotation period: 4.139±0.001 h (Note: Lightcurve plot of (7505) Furusho, by Brian Warner rotation period 4.140±0.005 hours with a brightness amplitude of 0.52±0.02 mag. Quality code is 3. Summary figures at the LCDB.)
- Geometric albedo: 0.211; 0.3732
- Spectral type: S (assumed)
- Absolute magnitude (H): 11.9; 12.30

7505 Furusho, provisional designation 1997 AM_{2}, is a stony asteroid and sizable Mars-crosser on an eccentric orbit from the asteroid belt, approximately 10 kilometers (6.2 miles) in diameter. It was discovered on 3 January 1997, by Japanese astronomer Takao Kobayashi at the Ōizumi Observatory in the Kantō region of Japan. The assumed S-type asteroid is likely elongated in shape and has a rotation period of 4.1 hours. It was named for Japanese astronomer Reiko Furusho.

== Orbit and classification ==
Furusho is a member of the Mars-crossing asteroids, a dynamically unstable group between the main belt and the near-Earth populations, crossing the orbit of Mars at 1.66 AU. It orbits the Sun at a distance of 1.6–3.6 AU once every 4 years and 3 months (1,563 days; semi-major axis of 2.64 AU). Its orbit has a high eccentricity of 0.38 and an inclination of 6° with respect to the ecliptic. The body's observation arc begins with its first observation as 1940 WC at the Crimean Simeiz Observatory in November 1940, or more than 56 years prior to its official discovery observation by Takao Kobayashi at Ōizumi in January 1997.

== Naming ==
This minor planet was named after Japanese astronomer Reiko Furusho (born 1970). Her research includes cometary physics, in particular the measurement of polarized light, caused by scattering on comet dust. Furusho also works in the education and popularization of astronomy. The official naming citation was published by the Minor Planet Center on 1 May 2003 (M.P.C. 48388).

== Physical characteristics ==
Furusho is an assumed S-type asteroid.

=== Rotation period ===
In November 2017, a rotational lightcurve of Furusho was obtained from photometric observations by Daniel Klinglesmith at Etscorn Observatory (719) in Socorro, New Mexico. Lightcurve analysis gave a well-defined rotation period of 4.139±0.001 hours with a high brightness variation of 0.63 magnitude (U=3).

The result agrees with previous period determinations by Hungarian astronomers at Konkoly Observatory in autumn 2001 (U=3), and with observations by astronomers at the Palomar Transient Factory in California in May 2011 (U=3). Robert Stephens at Santana Observatory (646) and Brian Warner at the Palmer Divide Station (U82) also determined an identical period in November 2001 and December 2013, respectively (U=3/3). All observations showed a classically shaped bimodal lightcurve with a high brightness amplitude between 0.52 and 0.75 magnitude, which is indicative of an elongated, non-spherical shape.

=== Diameter and albedo ===
According to the survey carried out by the Infrared Astronomical Satellite IRAS, Furusho measures 9.07 kilometers in diameter and its surface has an albedo of 0.37. In 2017, a study dedicated to Mars-crossing asteroids by the NEOWISE mission of NASA's Wide-field Infrared Survey Explorer determined a diameter of 10.04 kilometers with an albedo of 0.21. The Collaborative Asteroid Lightcurve Link derives an albedo of 0.29 and a diameter of 8.9 kilometers based on an absolute magnitude of 12.20.

==== Sizable Mars-crosser ====
With a diameter of 10 kilometers, Furusho is a typical "sizable" Mars-crosser (5–15 km) of which two dozens or so are known. These include 3581 Alvarez (13.7 km) 1065 Amundsenia (9.8 km), 1139 Atami (9.4 km), 3737 Beckman (14.4 km), 1474 Beira (15.5 km), 5682 Beresford (7.3 km), 7369 Gavrilin (5.5 km), 1011 Laodamia (7.4 km), 6170 Levasseur (5.7 km), 1727 Mette (5.4 km), 1131 Porzia (7.1 km), 985 Rosina (8.2 km), 1235 Schorria (5.6 km), 1310 Villigera (15.2 km), and 1468 Zomba (7 km), which are themselves smaller than the largest members of this dynamical group, namely, 132 Aethra, 323 Brucia (former Mars-crosser), 1508 Kemi, 2204 Lyyli and 512 Taurinensis, all larger than 20 kilometers.
