= 3343 Nedzel =

Mars-crossing asteroid

Discovery
- Discovered by: L. G. Taff
- Discovery site: Lincoln Lab's ETS
- Discovery date: 28 April 1982

Designations
- Named after: V. Alexander Nedzel (manager at Lincoln Lab)
- Alternative designations: 1982 HS
- Minor planet category: Mars-crosser

Orbital characteristics
- Epoch 4 September 2017 (JD 2458000.5)
- Uncertainty parameter 0
- Observation arc: 34.91 yr (12,750 days)
- Aphelion: 3.0816 AU
- Perihelion: 1.6170 AU
- Semi-major axis: 2.3493 AU
- Eccentricity: 0.3117
- Orbital period (sidereal): 3.60 yr (1,315 days)
- Mean anomaly: 264.02°
- Mean motion: 0° 16^{m} 25.32^{s} / day
- Inclination: 25.011°
- Longitude of ascending node: 43.460°
- Argument of perihelion: 229.71°
- Earth MOID: 0.6811 AU · 265.3 LD

Physical characteristics
- Dimensions: 5.18±1.09 km 6.21±0.62 km 6.81 km (calculated)
- Synodic rotation period: 5.4620±0.0005 h
- Geometric albedo: 0.20 (assumed); 0.264±0.053; 0.29±0.11
- Spectral type: S (SDSS-MFB)
- Absolute magnitude (H): 13.10 · 13.2 · 13.49

3343 Nedzel, provisional designation 1982 HS, is an asteroid and sizable Mars-crosser on an eccentric orbit from the inner regions of the asteroid belt, approximately 6.5 kilometers in diameter. It was discovered on 28 April 1982, by astronomer Laurence Taff at the Lincoln Laboratory's Experimental Test Site in Socorro, New Mexico, in the United States. The asteroid was named in memory of Alexander Nedzel, a manager at MIT Lincoln Laboratory.

== Orbit and classification ==
Nedzel is a Mars-crossing asteroid, a member of a dynamically unstable group, located between the main belt and the near-Earth populations, and crossing the orbit of Mars at 1.666 AU. It orbits the Sun in the inner main-belt at a distance of 1.6–3.1 AU once every 3 years and 7 months (1,315 days). Its orbit has an eccentricity of 0.31 and an inclination of 25° with respect to the ecliptic. The body's observation arc begins with its official discovery observation at Lincoln Lab ETS.

== Physical characteristics ==
Nedzel has been characterized as a common, stony S-type asteroid by SDSS-MFB (Masi Foglia Bus).

=== Rotation period ===
In July 2011, a rotational lightcurve of Nedzel was obtained from photometric observations at the Oakley Southern Sky Observatory (E09) in Australia. Lightcurve analysis gave a well-defined rotation period of 5.4620 hours with a high brightness variation of 0.56 magnitude (U=3). A high brightness amplitude is indicative for an elongated rather than spherical shape.

=== Diameter and albedo ===
According to the survey carried out by the NEOWISE mission of NASA's Wide-field Infrared Survey Explorer, Nedzel measures 5.18 and 6.21 kilometers in diameter and its surface has an albedo of 0.29 and 0.264, respectively.

The Collaborative Asteroid Lightcurve Link assumes a standard albedo for stony asteroids of 0.20 and calculates a diameter of 6.81 kilometers based on an absolute magnitude of 13.2.

With a diameter close to 6.5 kilometers, Nedzel is somewhat smaller than the largest sizable Mars-crossing asteroids such as 1065 Amundsenia (9.75 km), 1139 Atami (9.35 km), 1508 Kemi (17 km), 1011 Laodamia (7.4 km), 1727 Mette (est. 9 km), 1131 Porzia (7 km), 1235 Schorria (est. 9 km), 985 Rosina (8 km) 1310 Villigera (15 km), and 1468 Zomba (7 km); and significantly smaller than the largest members of this dynamical group, namely, 132 Aethra, 323 Brucia, 2204 Lyyli and 512 Taurinensis, which are all larger than 20 kilometers in diameter.

== Naming ==
This minor planet was named in memory of V. Alexander Nedzel (died 1984), head of MIT Lincoln Laboratory's Aerospace Division and supporter of the "Lincoln Laboratory Earth-Approaching Asteroid Search", presumably a precursor of the Lincoln Near-Earth Asteroid Research. The official naming citation was published by the Minor Planet Center on 22 June 1986 (M.P.C. 10849).
