= 3581 Alvarez =

Carbonaceous main belt asteroid

Discovery
- Discovered by: C. Shoemaker; E. Shoemaker
- Discovery site: Palomar Obs.
- Discovery date: 23 April 1985

Designations
- Named after: Luis Alvarez; Walter Alvarez (American scientists)
- Alternative designations: 1985 HC · 1962 JL; 1971 KE · 1981 TG_{4}
- Minor planet category: Mars crosser

Orbital characteristics
- Epoch 27 April 2019 (JD 2458600.5)
- Uncertainty parameter 0
- Observation arc: 56.37 yr (20,590 d)
- Aphelion: 3.9009 AU
- Perihelion: 1.6506 AU
- Semi-major axis: 2.7757 AU
- Eccentricity: 0.4053
- Orbital period (sidereal): 4.62 yr (1,689 d)
- Mean anomaly: 79.224°
- Mean motion: 0° 12^{m} 47.16^{s} / day
- Inclination: 28.858°
- Longitude of ascending node: 217.47°
- Argument of perihelion: 107.59°
- Mars MOID: 0.5301 AU
- T_{Jupiter}: 3.0440

Physical characteristics
- Mean diameter: 13.69±1.37 km
- Synodic rotation period: 33.42±0.02 h (Note: Lightcurve plot of (3581) Alvarez, Antelope Hills Observatory (H09) rotation period 33.42±0.02 hours with a brightness amplitude of 0.06±0.02 mag. Quality code is. Summary figures for (3581) Alvarez at the LCDB)
- Geometric albedo: 0.113
- Spectral type: SMASS = B
- Absolute magnitude (H): 12.10; 12.2; 12.30; 12.4

3581 Alvarez, provisional designation 1985 HC, is a carbonaceous asteroid and a very large Mars-crosser on an eccentric orbit from the asteroid belt, approximately 13.7 kilometers (8.5 miles) in diameter. It was discovered on 23 April 1985, by American astronomer couple Carolyn and Eugene Shoemaker at the Palomar Observatory in California. The likely spherical B-type asteroid has a rotation period of 33.4 hours. It was named for scientists Luis Alvarez and his son Walter Alvarez.

== Orbit and classification ==
Alvarez is a Mars-crossing asteroid, a dynamically unstable group between the main belt and the near-Earth populations, crossing the orbit of Mars at 1.66 AU. However, due to the high inclination of its orbit, it never actually passes through the orbit of Mars since at perihelion it is well away from Mars' orbital plane. It orbits the Sun at a distance of 1.7–3.9 AU once every 4 years and 7 months (1,689 days; semi-major axis of 2.78 AU). Its orbit has an eccentricity of 0.41, and an inclination of 29° with respect to the ecliptic. The body's observation arc begins with its first observation as 1962 JL at Goethe Link Observatory in May 1962, almost 23 years prior to its official discovery observation at Palomar.

== Naming ==
This minor planet was named after planetary scientist Walter Alvarez (born 1940) and his Nobel-prize winning father, physicist Luis Walter Alvarez (1911–1988). Both at University of California, Berkeley, they are best known for the discovery of a global geochemical anomaly of noble metals at the K-T boundary, which led to hypothesis that the dinosaurs were killed by an asteroid impact (also see Alvarez hypothesis). The official naming citation was published by the Minor Planet Center on 2 February 1988 (M.P.C. 12807), just a few months after the naming was announcement on the occasion of the second Conference on Global Catastrophes in Earth History, held in October 1987 at Snowbird, Utah.

== Physical characteristics ==
In the SMASS classification, Alvarez is a carbonaceous B-type asteroid, somewhat "brighter" than the more common C-type asteroids.

=== Rotation period ===
In September 2004, a rotational lightcurve of Alvarez was obtained from photometric observations by American photometrist William Koff at the Antelope Hills Observatory (H09) in Bennett, Colorado. Lightcurve analysis gave a longer-than-average rotation period of 33.42±0.02 hours with a small brightness amplitude of 0.06±0.02 magnitude (U=2), indicative of a spherical rather than elongated shape. The result supersedes a previous period determination by Wiesław Wiśniewski from 1990, which gave a period of at least 24 hours (U=1).

=== Diameter and albedo ===
According to the survey carried out by the NEOWISE mission of NASA's Wide-field Infrared Survey Explorer, Alvarez measures 13.69 kilometers in diameter and its surface has an albedo of 0.113. Previously published WISE data from 2013 and 2016 gave a concurring diameter of 14 and 13.7 kilometer with an albedo of 0.14 and 0.13, respectively. The Collaborative Asteroid Lightcurve Link assumes an albedo of 0.057 and derives a diameter of 18.43 kilometers based on an absolute magnitude of 12.4.

With a diameter close to 14 kilometers, Alvarez is larger than most sizeable Mars-crossing asteroids such as 1065 Amundsenia (9.75 km), 1139 Atami (9.35 km), 1011 Laodamia (7.39 km), 1727 Mette (5.44 km), 1131 Porzia (7.13 km), 1235 Schorria (5.55 km), 985 Rosina (8.18 km) and 1468 Zomba (7 km), comparable with 1310 Villigera (15.24 km) and 1474 Beira (15.46 km), but still smaller than the largest members of this dynamical group, namely, 132 Aethra, 323 Brucia (former Mars-crosser), 1508 Kemi, 2204 Lyyli and 512 Taurinensis, which are larger than 20 kilometers in diameter in at least one of the publications.
