= 1204 Renzia =

Asteroid

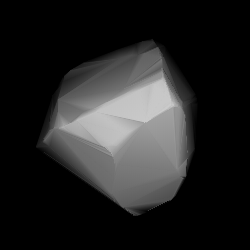
- Modelled shape of Renzia from its lightcurve

Discovery
- Discovered by: K. Reinmuth
- Discovery site: Heidelberg Obs.
- Discovery date: 6 October 1931; 95 years ago

Designations
- Named after: Franz Robert Renz (German-Russian astronomer)
- Alternative designations: 1931 TE
- Minor planet category: Mars-crosser

Orbital characteristics
- Epoch 4 September 2017 (JD 2458000.5)
- Uncertainty parameter 0
- Observation arc: 85.99 yr (31,407 days)
- Aphelion: 2.9279 AU
- Perihelion: 1.5984 AU
- Semi-major axis: 2.2632 AU
- Eccentricity: 0.2937
- Orbital period (sidereal): 3.40 yr (1,244 days)
- Mean anomaly: 110.18°
- Mean motion: 0° 17^{m} 22.2^{s} / day
- Inclination: 1.8796°
- Longitude of ascending node: 7.5758°
- Argument of perihelion: 313.75°
- Earth MOID: 0.5861 AU · 228.3 LD
- Mars MOID: 0.2114 AU

Physical characteristics
- Mean diameter: 10.49±2.10 km 10.73±0.31 km 10.82 km (derived)
- Synodic rotation period: 7.885±0.0025 h 7.885±0.015 h 7.88695±0.00005 h 7.88697±0.00001 h
- Geometric albedo: 0.2103 (derived); 0.222±0.014; 0.254±0.102
- Spectral type: SMASS = S
- Absolute magnitude (H): 11.736±0.002 (R) · 12.00 · 12.13±0.43 · 12.14 · 12.14±0.09 · 12.20

1204 Renzia (provisional designation 1931 TE) is a stony asteroid and sizable Mars-crosser on an eccentric orbit from the inner regions of the asteroid belt, approximately 10 kilometers in diameter. It was discovered by astronomer Karl Reinmuth at the Heidelberg-Königstuhl State Observatory in southwest Germany on 6 October 1931. The asteroid was named after German-Russian astronomer Franz Renz.

== Orbit and classification ==
Renzia is a Mars-crossing asteroid, a dynamically unstable group between the main belt and the near-Earth populations, crossing the orbit of Mars at 1.666 AU. It orbits the Sun at a distance of 1.6–2.9 AU once every 3 years and 5 months (1,244 days). Its orbit has an eccentricity of 0.29 and an inclination of 2° with respect to the ecliptic. The body's observation arc begins at Heidelberg with its official discovery observation in 1931.

=== Impact probability ===
In the 1980s, British astronomer Duncan Steel calculated that Renzia has the third highest probability of impacting into Mars among a large sample of Mars-crossing asteroids. With a collision probability of 4.84 impacts per billion orbits, Renzia is only behind the asteroids (9801) 1997 FX (4.96) and 8303 Miyaji (5.08), which are both significantly smaller. He also calculated that such an impact event may occur every 300,000 years, for an assumed population of 10 thousand Mars-crossers larger than 1 kilometer producing impact craters of at least 10 kilometers in diameter.

== Physical characteristics ==
In the SMASS classification, Renzia is a common stony S-type asteroid.

=== Lightcurves ===
In September 1982, a first rotational lightcurve of Renzia was obtained from photometric observations at the Table Mountain Observatory in California. Lightcurve analysis gave a rotation period of 7.885 hours with a brightness variation of 0.42 magnitude (U=3). In February 2012, observations in the R-band by astronomers at the Palomar Transient Factory gave an identical period with an amplitude of 0.49 magnitude (U=2).

Two 2016-studies also modeled the asteroid's lightcurve. They gave a concurring sidereal period of 7.88695 and 7.88697 hours. Each of the studies also determined two spin axis in ecliptic coordinates (λ, β): (142.0°, −50.0°) and (305.0°, −45.0°), as well as (130.0°, −44.0°) and (312.0°, −51.0°).

=== Diameter and albedo ===
According to the surveys carried out by the Japanese Akari satellite and the NEOWISE mission of NASA's Wide-field Infrared Survey Explorer, Renzia measures 10.49 and 10.73 kilometers in diameter and its surface has an albedo of 0.254 and 0.222, respectively. The Collaborative Asteroid Lightcurve Link derives an albedo of 0.2103 and a diameter of 10.82 kilometers based on an absolute magnitude of 12.14.

With a diameter above 10 kilometers, Renzia is larger than most sizable Mars-crossing asteroids such as 1065 Amundsenia (9.75 km), 1139 Atami (9.35 km), and 1474 Beira (15 km); but still smaller than the largest members of this dynamical group, namely, 132 Aethra, 323 Brucia, 1508 Kemi, 2204 Lyyli, and 512 Taurinensis, which are larger than 20 kilometers in diameter (in one or other given source).

== Naming ==
This minor planet was named after German-Russian astronomer Franz Robert Renz (1860–1942) also known as Franz Franzevich Renz, who worked at the Dorpat and Pulkovo observatories. The official naming citation was mentioned in The Names of the Minor Planets by Paul Herget in 1955 (H 112).
