= 1131 Porzia =

Asteroid within the Asteroid Belt

Discovery
- Discovered by: K. Reinmuth
- Discovery site: Heidelberg Obs.
- Discovery date: 10 September 1929

Designations
- Pronunciation: German: [ˈpɔʁtsi̯aː]
- Named after: Porcia Catonis (in Shakespeare's play); Julius Caesar
- Alternative designations: 1929 RO · 1939 TJ; 1962 MB
- Minor planet category: Mars-crosser

Orbital characteristics
- Epoch 4 September 2017 (JD 2458000.5)
- Uncertainty parameter 0
- Observation arc: 87.55 yr (31,978 days)
- Aphelion: 2.8667 AU
- Perihelion: 1.5893 AU
- Semi-major axis: 2.2280 AU
- Eccentricity: 0.2867
- Orbital period (sidereal): 3.33 yr (1,215 days)
- Mean anomaly: 165.22°
- Mean motion: 0° 17^{m} 47.04^{s} / day
- Inclination: 3.2292°
- Longitude of ascending node: 100.71°
- Argument of perihelion: 248.01°

Physical characteristics
- Dimensions: 6.53±0.65 km 7.13 km (calculated)
- Synodic rotation period: 4.0±0.2 h (dated); 4.6584±0.0005 h 4.6601±0.0006 h
- Geometric albedo: 0.20 (assumed); 0.287±0.057
- Spectral type: SMASS = S · S
- Absolute magnitude (H): 11.94±0.70 · 12.00 · 12.90 · 13.0 · 13.10±0.14

1131 Porzia, provisional designation 1929 RO, is a stony asteroid and sizable Mars-crosser from the innermost regions of the asteroid belt, approximately 7 kilometers in diameter. It was discovered on 10 September 1929, by German astronomer Karl Reinmuth at the Heidelberg Observatory in southwest Germany. The asteroid was named after Porcia wife of Brutus, who assassinated Julius Caesar.

== Orbit and classification ==
Porzia is a Mars-crossing asteroid, a dynamically unstable group between the main belt and the near-Earth populations, crossing the orbit of Mars at 1.666 AU. It orbits the Sun at a distance of 1.6–2.9 AU once every 3 years and 4 months (1,215 days). Its orbit has an eccentricity of 0.29 and an inclination of 3° with respect to the ecliptic. The body's observation arc begins at Heidelberg, 19 days after its official discovery observation.

== Physical characteristics ==
In the SMASS taxonomy, Porzia is a common stony S-type asteroid.

=== Lightcurves ===
Two rotational lightcurves of Porzia were obtained by Vladimir Benishek at Belgrade Observatory shortly before its opposition in November 2009, and by French amateur astronomer René Roy in December 2012. Lightcurve analysis gave a well defined rotation period of 4.6584 and 4.6601 hours with a brightness variation of 0.15 and 0.19 magnitude, respectively (U=3/3).

The results supersede photometric observations taken by Polish astronomer Wiesław Wiśniewski in January 1990, which rendered a lightcurve with a period 4.0±0.2 hours and an amplitude of 0.23 magnitude (U=2).

=== Diameter and albedo ===
According to the survey carried out by NASA's Wide-field Infrared Survey Explorer and its subsequent NEOWISE mission, Porzia measures 6.53 kilometers in diameter and its surface has an albedo of 0.287, while the Collaborative Asteroid Lightcurve Link assumes a standard albedo for stony asteroids of 0.20 and calculates a diameter of 7.13 kilometers with an absolute magnitude of 13.10.

This makes Porzia one of the larger mid-sized Mars-crossing asteroids comparable with 1065 Amundsenia (9.75 km), 1139 Atami (9.35 km), 1474 Beira (8.73 km), 1011 Laodamia (7.5 km), 1727 Mette (est. 9 km), 1235 Schorria (est. 9 km), 985 Rosina (8.18 km), 1310 Villigera (15.24 km) and 1468 Zomba (7 km), but far smaller than the largest members of this dynamical group, namely, 132 Aethra, 323 Brucia, 1508 Kemi, 2204 Lyyli and 512 Taurinensis, which are all larger than 20 kilometers in diameter.

== Naming ==
This minor planet was named after the wife of Brutus, Porcia Catonis, who kills herself at news of her husband's death in Shakespeare's play Julius Caesar. The official naming citation was also published by Paul Herget in The Names of the Minor Planets in 1955 (H 106).
