= Kazuo Kubokawa =

Japanese astronomer

Minor planets discovered: 1
1139 Atami ^{1}	1 December 1929	MPC
^{1} co-discovered with O. Oikawa

Kazuo Kubokawa (窪川 一雄, Kubokawa Kazuo, 1903 – January 3, 1943) was a Japanese astronomer, who, together with astronomer Okuro Oikawa, co-discovered the Mars-crosser asteroid 1139 Atami in 1929.

During the Japanese period in Taiwan, he was president of the Astronomical Association, Taiwan Branch beginning in 1938. He began to build "New High Mountain Observatory" (新高山 天文台) in 1942, but died the following year.

Asteroid 6140 Kubokawa is named after him.
