= 1468 Zomba =

Mars-crossing asteroid

Discovery
- Discovered by: C. Jackson
- Discovery site: Johannesburg Obs.
- Discovery date: 23 July 1938

Designations
- Named after: Zomba (Malawian city)
- Alternative designations: 1938 PA
- Minor planet category: Mars-crosser

Orbital characteristics
- Epoch 4 September 2017 (JD 2458000.5)
- Uncertainty parameter 0
- Observation arc: 78.47 yr (28,660 days)
- Aphelion: 2.7913 AU
- Perihelion: 1.5998 AU
- Semi-major axis: 2.1956 AU
- Eccentricity: 0.2713
- Orbital period (sidereal): 3.25 yr (1,188 days)
- Mean anomaly: 95.275°
- Mean motion: 0° 18^{m} 10.8^{s} / day
- Inclination: 9.9388°
- Longitude of ascending node: 308.93°
- Argument of perihelion: 23.188°

Physical characteristics
- Dimensions: 6.97±1.39 km 8.57 km (calculated)
- Synodic rotation period: 2.769±0.005 h (Note: Lightcurve plot of (1468) Zomba, Brian Warner (2015), Palmer Divide Station, California. Rotation period 2.769±0.005 hours with a brightness amplitude of 0.33 mag. Quality code of 3-ä. Summary figures at the LCDB); 2.77 h 2.772±0.006 h 2.773±0.001 h
- Geometric albedo: 0.20 (assumed); 0.302±0.121
- Spectral type: Q · S (assumed)
- Absolute magnitude (H): 12.70 · 13.05±0.45

1468 Zomba, provisional designation 1938 PA, is a stony asteroid and large Mars-crosser near the innermost regions of the asteroid belt, approximately 7 kilometers in diameter. Discovered by Cyril Jackson at Johannesburg Observatory in 1938, the asteroid was named after the city of Zomba in the Republic of Malawi.

== Discovery ==
Zomba was discovered on 23 July 1938, by South African astronomer Cyril Jackson at the Union Observatory in Johannesburg, South Africa. It was independently discovered by French astronomer Louis Boyer at the Algiers Observatory, Algeria, on 2 August 1938, who first announce the asteroid's discovery. The Minor Planet Center (MPC) only recognizes the first discoverer.

== Orbit and classification ==
Zomba is a Mars-crossing asteroid, a dynamically unstable group between the main belt and the near-Earth populations, crossing the orbit of Mars at 1.666 AU. It orbits the Sun at a distance of 1.6–2.8 AU once every 3 years and 3 months (1,188 days). Its orbit has an eccentricity of 0.27 and an inclination of 10° with respect to the ecliptic. The body's observation arc begins with its official discovery observation at Johannesburg.

== Physical characteristics ==
Zomba has been characterized as a Q-type asteroid by Pan-STARRS photometric survey. The Lightcurve Data Base assumes it to be a common S-type asteroid.

=== Rotation period ===
Several rotational lightcurves of Zomba have been obtained from photometric observations. Lightcurve analysis gave a consolidated rotation period of 2.773 hours with a brightness amplitude between 0.3 and 0.36 magnitude (U=3-/2/3/3).

=== Diameter and albedo ===
According to the survey carried out by the NEOWISE mission of NASA's Wide-field Infrared Survey Explorer, Zomba measures 6.97 kilometers in diameter and its surface has an albedo of 0.302, while the Collaborative Asteroid Lightcurve Link assumes a standard albedo for stony asteroids of 0.20 and calculates a diameter of 8.57 kilometers based on an absolute magnitude of 12.7.

This makes Zomba one of the largest mid-sized Mars-crossing asteroids comparable with 1065 Amundsenia (9.75 km), 1139 Atami (9.35 km), 1474 Beira (8.73 km), 1011 Laodamia (7.39 km), 1727 Mette (est 9 km), 1131 Porzia (7.13 km), 1235 Schorria (est. 9 km), 985 Rosina (8.18 km) and 1310 Villigera (15.24 km), but far smaller than the largest members of this dynamical group, namely, 132 Aethra, 323 Brucia, 1508 Kemi, 2204 Lyyli and 512 Taurinensis, which are all larger than 20 kilometers in diameter.

== Naming ==
This minor planet was named after the town of Zomba in the Republic of Malawi, known as Nyasaland, a British protectorate, at the time of naming. The official naming citation was published by the Minor Planet Center in April 1953 (M.P.C. 909).
