= 1139 Atami =

Mars-crossing asteroid

Discovery
- Discovered by: O. Oikawa; K. Kubokawa
- Discovery site: Tokyo Astronomical Obs. (389)
- Discovery date: 1 December 1929

Designations
- Pronunciation: Japanese: [atami]
- Named after: Atami (Japanese city)
- Alternative designations: 1929 XE
- Minor planet category: Mars-crosser

Orbital characteristics
- Epoch 4 September 2017 (JD 2458000.5)
- Uncertainty parameter 0
- Observation arc: 87.50 yr (31,960 days)
- Aphelion: 2.4451 AU
- Perihelion: 1.4505 AU
- Semi-major axis: 1.9478 AU
- Eccentricity: 0.2553
- Orbital period (sidereal): 2.72 yr (993 days)
- Mean anomaly: 110.80°
- Mean motion: 0° 21^{m} 45.36^{s} / day
- Inclination: 13.087°
- Longitude of ascending node: 213.35°
- Argument of perihelion: 206.62°
- Known satellites: 1
- Earth MOID: 0.4722 AU · 184 LD
- Mars MOID: 0.0298 AU

Physical characteristics
- Dimensions: 8.24±0.82 km 9.35 km (calculated)
- Synodic rotation period: 15 h 20 h 24 h 27.43±0.05; 27.446±0.001 h 27.45±0.01 h 27.45±0.05 h 27.472±0.002 h 27.56±0.01 h (Note: Lightcurve plot of (1139) Atami, Robert Koff, Antelope Hills Observatory (H09). Summary figures at LCDB)
- Geometric albedo: 0.20 (assumed); 0.258±0.052
- Spectral type: S (Tholen) · S (SMASS); S B–V = 0.920; U–B = 0.497
- Absolute magnitude (H): 12.51 · 12.59±0.37 · 12.86±0.02

1139 Atami, provisional designation 1929 XE, is a stony asteroid and sizable Mars-crosser, as well as a synchronous binary system near the innermost region of the asteroid belt, approximately 9 kilometers in diameter. It was discovered on 1 December 1929, by Japanese astronomers Okuro Oikawa and Kazuo Kubokawa at the Tokyo Astronomical Observatory (389) near Tokyo. It was named after the Japanese city of Atami. It has the lowest Minimum orbit intersection distance (MOID) to Mars of any asteroid as large as it, its orbit intersecting only 0.03 astronomical units from the planet.

== Classification and orbit ==
Atami is a Mars-crossing asteroid, a dynamically unstable group between the main belt and the near-Earth populations, crossing the orbit of Mars at 1.666 AU. It orbits the Sun at a distance of 1.5–2.4 AU once every 2 years and 9 months (993 days). Its orbit has an eccentricity of 0.26 and an inclination of 13° with respect to the ecliptic. The body's observation arc begins with its official discovery observation at Tokyo in 1929.

== Physical characteristics ==
=== Spectral type ===
Atami is a common stony S-type asteroid in both the Tholen and SMASS classification. It has also been characterized as a S-type by Pan-STARRS photometric survey.

=== Binary system ===
In 2005, two rotational lightcurves obtained at the U.S. Antelope Hills Observatory in New Mexico and by a collaboration of several European astronomers gave a rotation period of 27.56±0.01 and 27.446±0.001 hours with a brightness variation of 0.45 and 0.40 in magnitude, respectively (U=3/3).

Photometric and Arecibo echo spectra observations in 2005 confirmed a 5 kilometer satellite orbiting at least 15 kilometers from its primary. Due to the similar size of the primary and secondary the Minor Planet Center lists this as a binary companion.

=== Diameter and albedo ===
According to the survey carried out by NASA's Wide-field Infrared Survey Explorer and its subsequent NEOWISE mission, Atami measures 8.24 kilometers in diameter and its surface has an albedo of 0.258, while the Collaborative Asteroid Lightcurve Link assumes a standard albedo for stony asteroids of 0.20 and calculates a diameter of 9.35 kilometers based on an absolute magnitude of 12.51.

This makes Atami one of the largest mid-sized Mars-crossing asteroids comparable with 1065 Amundsenia (9.75 km), 1474 Beira (8.73 km), 1011 Laodamia (7.5 km), 1727 Mette (est. 9 km), 1131 Porzia (7.13 km), 1235 Schorria (est. 9 km), 985 Rosina (8.18 km), 1310 Villigera (15.24 km) and 1468 Zomba (7 km), but far smaller than the largest members of this dynamical group, namely, 132 Aethra, 323 Brucia, 1508 Kemi, 2204 Lyyli and 512 Taurinensis, which are all larger than 20 kilometers in diameter.

== Naming ==
The minor planet was named after Atami, a Japanese city and harbor near Tokyo, Japan. The naming citation was first mentioned in The Names of the Minor Planets by Paul Herget in 1955 (H 106).
