= 1065 Amundsenia =

Mars-crossing asteroid

Discovery
- Discovered by: S. Belyavskyj
- Discovery site: Simeiz Obs.
- Discovery date: 4 August 1926

Designations
- Named after: Roald Amundsen (Norwegian polar explorer)
- Alternative designations: 1926 PD · 1930 XL; 1955 QE · 1955 RD; 1955 SM_{1}
- Minor planet category: Mars-crosser

Orbital characteristics
- Epoch 4 September 2017 (JD 2458000.5)
- Uncertainty parameter 0
- Observation arc: 91.15 yr (33,294 days)
- Aphelion: 3.0617 AU
- Perihelion: 1.6604 AU
- Semi-major axis: 2.3611 AU
- Eccentricity: 0.2968
- Orbital period (sidereal): 3.63 yr (1,325 days)
- Mean anomaly: 38.699°
- Mean motion: 0° 16^{m} 18.12^{s} / day
- Inclination: 8.3607°
- Longitude of ascending node: 330.34°
- Argument of perihelion: 353.68°
- Mars MOID: 0.2734 AU

Physical characteristics
- Dimensions: 8.85±0.15 km 9.75 km (derived); 12.40±2.48 km
- Synodic rotation period: 7.7594±0.0002 h (Note: Pravec (2006) web: from October/November 2006. Rotation period 7.7594 hours: Lightcurveplot-Oct (0.14 mag) and Lightcurveplot-Nov (0.16 mag). Source: SPleso, Carbuncle, GMARS aut 23.11.2011 Pravec, Kusnirak. Quality Code of 3. Summary figures for (1065) Amundsenia at LCDB and Ondrejov Asteroid Photometry Project (see data sheet))
- Geometric albedo: 0.151±0.060; 0.20 (assumed); 0.399±0.016
- Spectral type: SMASS = S
- Absolute magnitude (H): 11.90 · 11.97±0.08 (R) · 12.20 · 12.43±0.37 · 12.46 · 12.46±0.094

1065 Amundsenia, provisional designation 1926 PD, is a stony asteroid and sizeable Mars-crosser on an eccentric orbit from the inner asteroid belt, approximately 10 kilometers in diameter. It was discovered on 4 August 1926, by Soviet astronomer Sergey Belyavsky at the Simeiz Observatory on the Crimean peninsula. The asteroid was named after Norwegian polar explorer Roald Amundsen.

== Orbit and classification ==
Amundsenia is a Mars-crossing asteroid, a member of the dynamically unstable group, located between the main belt and near-Earth populations, and crossing the orbit of Mars at 1.666 AU. It orbits the Sun in the innermost asteroid belt at a distance of 1.7–3.1 AU once every 3 years and 8 months (1,325 days). Its orbit has an eccentricity of 0.30 and an inclination of 8° with respect to the ecliptic. The body's observation arc begins at Simeiz Observatory with its official discovery observation in 1926.

== Physical characteristics ==
In the SMASS classification, Amundsenia is a common stony S-type asteroid.

=== Rotation period ===
In November 2006, a rotational lightcurve of Amundsenia was obtained from photometric observations by Petr Pravec at Ondřejov Observatory in the Czech Republic. Lightcurve analysis gave a well-defined rotation period of 7.7594 hours with a brightness amplitude between 0.14 and 0.16 magnitude (U=3).

=== Diameter and albedo ===
According to the surveys carried out by the Japanese Akari satellite and the NEOWISE mission of NASA's Wide-field Infrared Survey Explorer, Amundsenia measures between 8.85 and 12.40 kilometers in diameter and its surface has an albedo between 0.151 and 0.399. The Collaborative Asteroid Lightcurve Link assumes a standard albedo for stony asteroids of 0.20 and derives a diameter of 9.75 kilometers based on an absolute magnitude of 12.46.

With a diameter of approximately 10 kilometers, Amundsenia is one of the largest mid-sized Mars-crossing asteroids such as 1139 Atami (9.35 km), 1474 Beira (14.9 km), 1011 Laodamia (7.39 km), 1727 Mette (est 9 km), 1131 Porzia (7.13 km), 1235 Schorria (est. 9 km), 985 Rosina (8.18 km) 1310 Villigera (15.24 km), and 1468 Zomba (7 km); but still smaller than the largest members of this group, namely, 132 Aethra, 323 Brucia, 1508 Kemi, 2204 Lyyli and 512 Taurinensis, which are larger than 20 kilometers in diameter (in one or other given source).

== Naming ==
This minor planet was named after Roald Amundsen (1872–1928), the prolific Norwegian polar explorer of both the Arctic and Antarctic regions. He was the first to reach the South Pole in December 1911. He died during the rescue mission of Airship Italia in 1928. The official naming citation was mentioned in The Names of the Minor Planets by Paul Herget in 1955 (H 101). He is also honored by a lunar crater Amundsen.
