= 2003 BR47 =

Sub-kilometer asteroid

2003 BR_{47}
Discovery
- Discovered by: LINEAR
- Discovery site: Lincoln Lab ETS
- Discovery date: 31 January 2003

Designations
- Minor planet category: NEO · Apollo · PHA; Earth crosser, Mars crosser

Orbital characteristics
- Epoch 21 November 2025 (JD 2461000.5)
- Uncertainty parameter 0
- Observation arc: 9,126 days (24.99 yr)
- Aphelion: 2.4423416 AU (365.36910 Gm)
- Perihelion: 0.81362381 AU (121.716390 Gm)
- Semi-major axis: 1.6279827 AU (243.54275 Gm)
- Eccentricity: 0.5002258
- Orbital period (sidereal): 2.08 yr (758.71 d)
- Mean anomaly: 11.659556°
- Mean motion: 0° 28^{m} 28.173^{s} /day
- Inclination: 4.423097°
- Longitude of ascending node: 314.39558°
- Argument of perihelion: 112.74665°
- Earth MOID: 0.00748097 AU (1,119,137 km)
- Jupiter MOID: 2.91005 AU (435.337 Gm)

Physical characteristics
- Dimensions: 300-600 m^{[a]}
- Absolute magnitude (H): 21.53

2003 BR_{47} is a sub-kilometer asteroid classified as near-Earth object and potentially hazardous asteroid of the Apollo group. It was discovered on 31 January 2003 by the LINEAR program. As of 3 January 2026, its orbit is based on 177 observations spanning a data-arc of 9,126 days.

It comes to within 0.05 AU of Earth periodically. It is also an Earth crosser and a Mars crosser.

== See also ==
- 99942 Apophis

== Notes ==
- This is assuming an albedo of 0.25–0.05.
