= 3401 Vanphilos =

Mars-crossing asteroid

Discovery
- Discovered by: Harvard College Obs.
- Discovery site: Oak Ridge Obs. (Agassiz Stn.)
- Discovery date: 1 August 1981

Designations
- Named after: Vanessa Hall; Philip Osborne (friends of G. V. Williams)
- Alternative designations: 1981 PA · 1946 DA
- Minor planet category: Mars crosser

Orbital characteristics
- Epoch 4 September 2017 (JD 2458000.5)
- Uncertainty parameter 0
- Observation arc: 70.38 yr (25,708 days)
- Aphelion: 3.2195 AU
- Perihelion: 1.5147 AU
- Semi-major axis: 2.3671 AU
- Eccentricity: 0.3601
- Orbital period (sidereal): 3.64 yr (1,330 days)
- Mean anomaly: 264.28°
- Mean motion: 0° 16^{m} 14.16^{s} / day
- Inclination: 21.797°
- Longitude of ascending node: 322.38°
- Argument of perihelion: 108.64°
- Mars MOID: 0.1190 AU

Physical characteristics
- Dimensions: 7.023±1.045 km 7.10±4.56 km 10.30 km (calculated)
- Synodic rotation period: 4.225±0.001 h 4.226±0.001 h 4.2261±0.0005 h (Note: Pravec (2008) web: rotation period 4.2261±0.0005 hours with a brightness amplitude of 0.51 mag and quality code of 3. Summary figures for (3401) Vanphilos at Collaborative Asteroid Lightcurve Link (CALL) and Pravec, P.; Wolf, M.; Sarounova, L. (2008) at Ondřejov Observatory); 4.227±0.005 h
- Geometric albedo: 0.20 (assumed); 0.31±0.15; 0.377±0.198
- Spectral type: SMASS = S · S
- Absolute magnitude (H): 12.29±0.27 · 12.3 · 12.65

3401 Vanphilos, provisional designation 1981 PA, is a stony, eccentric asteroid and sizeable Mars-crosser, approximately 7 kilometers in diameter. It was discovered on 1 August 1981, by and at Harvard's Oak Ridge Observatory (Agassiz Station) in Massachusetts, United States.

== Orbit and classification ==
Vanphilos orbits the Sun in the inner main-belt at a distance of 1.5–3.2 AU once every 3 years and 8 months (1,330 days). Its orbit has an eccentricity of 0.36 and an inclination of 22° with respect to the ecliptic. In 1946, it was first identified as 1946 DA at the Finnish Turku Observatory, extending the body's observation arc by 35 years prior to its official discovery at Harvard.

== Physical characteristics ==
In the SMASS taxonomy, Vanphilos is characterized as a common S-type asteroid.

=== Rotation period ===
In February and March 2008, three rotational lightcurves of Vanphilos were obtained from photometric observations by astronomers Petr Pravec, James W. Brinsfield and Robert Stephens. Light-curve analysis gave a well defined rotation period of 4.225 and 4.226 hours, respectively, with a change in brightness between 0.50 and 0.54 magnitude (U=3/3/3).

In August 2014, astronomer Brian Warner derived a concurring period of 4.227 hours with an amplitude of 0.62 magnitude from his observations taken at the Palmer Divide Station in Colorado (U=3). Light-curve plots were published on-line by the Ondřejov Observatory and the Center for Solar System Studies. (Note: Online published Lightcure plots of (3401) Vanphilos at the Center for Solar System Studies (CS3) in 2014) (Note: Online published lightcure plot of (3401) Vanphilos at Ondřejov Observatory in 2008)

=== Diameter and albedo ===
According to the survey carried out by NASA's Wide-field Infrared Survey Explorer with its subsequent NEOWISE mission, Vanphilos measures 7.02 and 7.10 kilometers in diameter, and its surface has an albedo of 0.377 and 0.31, respectively. The Collaborative Asteroid Lightcurve Link assumes a standard albedo for stony asteroids of 0.20 and calculates a diameter of 10.30 kilometers, as the lower the body's albedo (reflectivity), the larger its diameter, at a constant absolute magnitude.

== Naming ==
This minor planet was named for Vanessa Hall and Philip Osborne, by astronomer G. V. William to celebrate their marriage on 3 August 1991. The approved naming citation was published by the Minor Planet Center on 25 August 1991 (M.P.C. 18644).
