= (31345) 1998 PG =

Eccentric, stony asteroid and binary system

Discovery
- Discovered by: LONEOS
- Discovery site: Anderson Mesa Stn.
- Discovery date: 3 August 1998

Designations
- Minor planet category: NEO · Amor

Orbital characteristics
- Epoch 4 September 2017 (JD 2458000.5)
- Uncertainty parameter 0
- Observation arc: 38.54 yr (14,075 days)
- Aphelion: 2.8048 AU
- Perihelion: 1.2277 AU
- Semi-major axis: 2.0162 AU
- Eccentricity: 0.3911
- Orbital period (sidereal): 2.86 yr (1,046 days)
- Mean anomaly: 215.36°
- Mean motion: 0° 20^{m} 39.48^{s} / day
- Inclination: 6.5013°
- Longitude of ascending node: 222.74°
- Argument of perihelion: 156.11°
- Known satellites: 1 (Note: Pravec (2006) Photometric survey of binary near-Earth asteroids, Icarus, 181:63-93. Summary figures: albedo of 0.18; diameter of primary 0.9±0.2 km; ratio: D_{s}/D_{p} of 0.3;. Figures are listed at johnstonsarchive.net)
- Earth MOID: 0.2354 AU · 91.7 LD

Physical characteristics
- Dimensions: 0.880 km (derived); 0.9±0.2 km 0.940±0.21 (derived)
- Synodic rotation period: 2.5 h 2.51620±0.00003 h
- Geometric albedo: 0.18; 0.20 (assumed)
- Spectral type: SMASS = Sq · S B–V = 0.810±0.020; V–R = 0.440±0.010; V–I = 0.760±0.020
- Absolute magnitude (H): 17.3 · 17.64±0.14

(31345) 1998 PG is an eccentric, stony asteroid and binary system, classified as near-Earth object of the Amor group of asteroids, approximately 900 meters in diameter. It minor-planet moon has an estimated diameter of 270 meters.

This asteroid was discovered on 3 August 1998, by the Lowell Observatory Near-Earth-Object Search (LONEOS) at Anderson Mesa Station, near Flagstaff, Arizona, United States.

== Orbit ==
1998 PG orbits the Sun at a distance of 1.2–2.8 AU once every 2 years and 10 months (1,046 days). Its orbit has an eccentricity of 0.39 and an inclination of 7° with respect to the ecliptic. A first precovery was taken at Palomar Observatory in 1978, extending the body's observation arc by 20 years prior to its official discovery observation at Anderson Mesa.

=== Close approaches ===
The asteroid has an Earth minimum orbital intersection distance of 0.2354 AU (35,200,000 km), which translates into approximately 92 lunar distances. It has made multiple close approaches to Earth, with the closest being 35,648,680 kilometers on 15 October 1978. With an aphelion of more than 2.8 AU, 1998 PG is also a Mars-crosser.

== Physical characteristics ==
=== Spectral type ===
In the SMASS taxonomy, 1998 PG is classified as a transitional Sq-type, which is an intermediary between the common stony S-type and the less frequent Q-type asteroids.

=== Diameter and albedo ===
According to the 2006-published Photometric survey of binary near-Earth asteroids by Petr Pravec and derived data from the Collaborative Asteroid Lightcurve Link and the "Johnston's archive", 1998 PG measures between 880 and 940 meters in diameter and its surface has an albedo of 0.18 and 0.20, respectively.

=== Rotation ===
In the late 1990s, a rotational lightcurve of 1998 PG was obtained from photometric observations by Hungarian astronomers László Kiss, Gyula Szabó and Krisztián Sárneczky. Lightcurve analysis gave a rotation period of 2.5 hours with a brightness variation of 0.1 magnitude (U=n.a.).

A second lightcurve obtained and published in 2000, by an international collaboration of astronomers gave a rotation period of 2.51620±0.00003 hours with a brightness amplitude of 0.11 magnitude (U=2).

== Moon ==
During the second photometric observation, it was discovered that 1998 PG is a probable/possible asynchronous binary system with a minor-planet moon orbiting it every 7.0035 hours, or twice this period solution.

The moon remains undesignated. The system has an estimated secondary-to-primary mean-diameter ratio of more than 0.3, which translates into a diameter of 270 meter for the satellite. The "Johnston's archive" also estimates that the moon's orbit has a semi-major axis of 1.4 kilometers.

From the surface of 1998 PG, the moon would have an angular diameter of about 16.3°. (Note: Calculated by solving $\scriptstyle{\mathrm{tan}\left(\frac{\theta}{2}\right) = \frac{\mathrm{radius~of~moon}}{\mathrm{distance~from~surface~of~asteroid~to~center~of~moon}}}$.) For comparison, the Sun appears to be 0.5° from Earth.

== Numbering and naming ==
This minor planet was numbered by the Minor Planet Center on 30 November 2001. As of 2018, it has not been named.

== Gallery ==
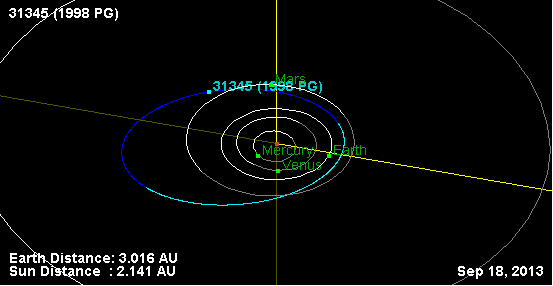
Orbit of 1998 PG

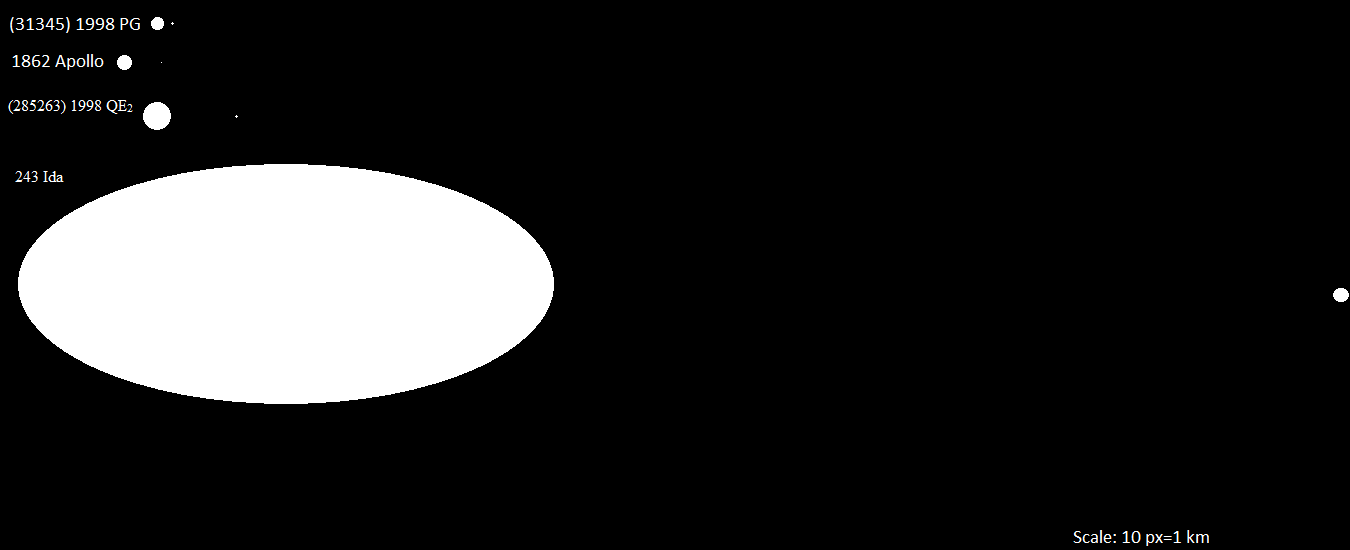
The 1998 PG system compared to other binary asteroids
