= 1474 Beira =

Asteroid

Discovery
- Discovered by: C. Jackson
- Discovery site: Johannesburg Obs.
- Discovery date: 20 August 1935

Designations
- Named after: Beira (city in Mozambique)
- Alternative designations: 1935 QY · 1950 DQ
- Minor planet category: Mars-crosser

Orbital characteristics
- Epoch 4 September 2017 (JD 2458000.5)
- Uncertainty parameter 0
- Observation arc: 81.06 yr (29,606 d)
- Aphelion: 4.0740 AU
- Perihelion: 1.3920 AU
- Semi-major axis: 2.7330 AU
- Eccentricity: 0.4907
- Orbital period (sidereal): 4.52 yr (1,650 days)
- Mean anomaly: 19.609°
- Mean motion: 0° 13^{m} 5.16^{s} / day
- Inclination: 26.683°
- Longitude of ascending node: 323.50°
- Argument of perihelion: 84.070°

Physical characteristics
- Dimensions: 8.73 km (calculated); 14.9±1.5 km 15±2 km 15.46±1.55 km
- Synodic rotation period: 4.184±0.001 h (Note: Lightcurve plot of (1474) Beira, Robert Koff, Antelope Hills Observatory (H09). Summary figures at LCDB); 4.184±0.002 h
- Geometric albedo: 0.06±0.01; 0.064±0.013; 0.07±0.01; 0.20 (assumed)
- Spectral type: Tholen = FX; SMASS = B B–V = 0.620; U–B = 0.245
- Absolute magnitude (H): 12.66

1474 Beira, provisional designation 1935 QY, is a bright carbonaceous asteroid and large Mars-crosser on an eccentric orbit from the asteroid belt, approximately 15 kilometers in diameter. It was discovered on 20 August 1935, by South African astronomer Cyril Jackson at the Union Observatory in Johannesburg. The asteroid was named after the port city of Beira in Mozambique.

== Orbit and classification ==
Beira is a Mars-crossing asteroid, a dynamically unstable group between the main belt and the near-Earth populations, crossing the orbit of Mars at 1.666 AU. It orbits the Sun at a distance of 1.4–4.1 AU once every 4 years and 6 months (1,650 days). Its orbit has a high eccentricity of 0.49 and an inclination of 27° with respect to the ecliptic. The body's observation arc begins with its official discovery observation at Johannesburg in 1935.

== Physical characteristics ==
In the SMASS classification, Beira is a bright carbonaceous B-type asteroid, while in the Tholen classification its spectral type is ambiguous, closest to an F-type and somewhat similar to that of an X-type asteroid.

=== Rotation period ===
Three rotational lightcurves of Beira were obtained from photometric observations. Lightcurve analysis gave a well-defined rotation period of 4.184 hours with a brightness amplitude between 0.15 and 0.24 magnitude (U=3/3/3).

=== Diameter and albedo ===
According to the survey carried out by the NEOWISE mission of NASA's Wide-field Infrared Survey Explorer, Beira measures between 14.9 and 15.46 kilometers in diameter and its surface has a low albedo between 0.06 and 0.07. Conversely, the Collaborative Asteroid Lightcurve Link assumes a standard albedo for stony asteroids of 0.20 and consequently calculates a smaller diameter of 8.73 kilometers using an absolute magnitude of 12.66.

With a diameter close to 15 kilometers, Beira is larger than most sizeable Mars-crossing asteroids such as 1065 Amundsenia (9.75 km), 1139 Atami (9.35 km), 1011 Laodamia (7.39 km), 1727 Mette (est 9 km), 1131 Porzia (7.13 km), 1235 Schorria (est. 9 km), 985 Rosina (8.18 km) 1310 Villigera (15.24 km), and 1468 Zomba (7 km); but still smaller than the largest members of this dynamical group, namely, 132 Aethra, 323 Brucia, 1508 Kemi, 2204 Lyyli and 512 Taurinensis, which are larger than 20 kilometers in diameter (in one or other given source).

== Naming ==
This minor planet was named after the port city of Beira in Mozambique. The official naming citation was published by the Minor Planet Center in April 1953 (M.P.C. 909).
