= List of Mars-crossing minor planets =

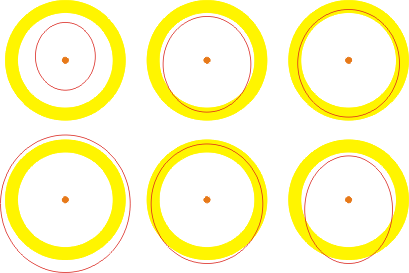
The orbit of Mars (yellow band; varies between 1.381 and 1.666 AU) displayed with 6 theoretically possible orbits for an asteroid (red line). The orbit of a Mars-crosser is displayed in the bottom row on the right. In generic terms, a Mars-crosser has a smaller perihelion and a larger aphelion compared to Mars. Special cases include inner-grazers (top row, in the middle) and outer-grazers (bottom row, in the middle), which do not completely cross the orbital band described by Mars. The other three diagrams describe a co-orbital configuration (top row, on the right) where the asteroid's orbit is contained within the orbital band of Mars, as well as a near-Earth asteroid such as an Amor asteroid (top row, on the left) and a main-belt asteroid, for example of the Hungaria family, which orbits are contained completely either inside or outside the orbit of Mars, respectively.

A Mars-crossing asteroid (MCA, also Mars-crosser, MC) is an asteroid whose orbit crosses that of Mars. Some Mars-crossers numbered below 100000 are listed here. They include the two numbered Mars trojans 5261 Eureka and (101429) 1998 VF31.

Many databases, for instance the JPL Small-Body Database (JPL SBDB), only list asteroids with a perihelion greater than 1.3 AU as Mars-crossers. An asteroid with a perihelion less than this is classed as a near-Earth object even though it is crossing the orbit of Mars as well as crossing (or coming near to) that of Earth. Nevertheless, these objects are listed on this page. A grazer is an object with a perihelion below the aphelion of Mars (1.67 AU) but above the Martian perihelion (1.38 AU). The JPL SBDB lists 13,500 Mars-crossing asteroids. Only 18 MCAs are brighter than absolute magnitude (H) 12.5, which typically makes these asteroids with H<12.5 more than 13 km in diameter depending on the albedo. The smallest known MCAs have an absolute magnitude (H) of around 24 and are typically less than 100 meters in diameter. There are over 21,600 known Mars-crossers of which only 5751 have received a MPC number.

Earth having more gravity and surface area than Mars attracts more impactors than Mars. Earth is impacted about 20 times more than the Moon, and Mars only gets impacted about 3 to 5 times more than the Moon.

== Co-orbital ==
L_{4} (leading cloud):

- (121514) 1999 UJ7

L_{5} (trailing cloud):

- 5261 Eureka – the only named Mars trojan
- (101429) 1998 VF31
- (311999) 2007 NS2
- (385250) 2001 DH47
- (816688) 2011 SC191
- 2011 UN63

Candidates

- 2011 SL25

== Inner grazers ==
- 1951 Lick
- 4947 Ninkasi
- (10302) 1989 ML
- 15817 Lucianotesi
- (21374) 1997 WS22
- (39774) 1997 GO27
- (52381) 1993 HA
- 52387 Huitzilopochtli
- (54071) 2000 GQ146
- (67367) 2000 LY27
- (68031) 2000 YK29
- (68278) 2001 FC7
- (85184) 1991 JG1
- (85236) 1993 KH
- (85989) 1999 JD6
- (87024) 2000 JS66
- (87684) 2000 SY2
- (88213) 2001 AF2
- (90367) 2003 LC5
- (90403) 2003 YE45

== Inner grazers that are also Earth-crossers or grazers ==
- 1620 Geographos
- 1865 Cerberus
- 2063 Bacchus
- 3361 Orpheus
- 3362 Khufu
- 3753 Cruithne
- 4034 Vishnu
- 4581 Asclepius
- 4769 Castalia
- 6239 Minos
- (10115) 1992 SK
- 11500 Tomaiyowit
- 12711 Tukmit
- (17511) 1992 QN
- (22099) 2000 EX106
- (68950) 2002 QF15

== Mars-crossers that are also Earth-crossers or grazers ==
These objects are not catalogued as Mars-crossers in databases such as the Jet Propulsion Laboratory's online Small-body Database Browser. Instead, they are categorized as Near Earth Objects (NEOs).

- 1566 Icarus
- 1685 Toro
- 1862 Apollo
- 1863 Antinous
- 1864 Daedalus
- 1866 Sisyphus
- 1981 Midas
- 2101 Adonis
- 2102 Tantalus
- 2135 Aristaeus
- 2201 Oljato
- 2212 Hephaistos
- 2329 Orthos
- 3103 Eger
- 3200 Phaethon
- 3360 Syrinx
- 3671 Dionysus
- 3752 Camillo
- 3838 Epona
- 4015 Wilson-Harrington
- 4179 Toutatis
- 4183 Cuno
- 4197 Morpheus
- 4257 Ubasti
- 4341 Poseidon
- 4450 Pan
- 4486 Mithra
- 4660 Nereus
- (4953) 1990 MU
- 5011 Ptah
- (5131) 1990 BG
- 5143 Heracles
- (5189) 1990 UQ
- (5496) 1973 NA
- (5645) 1990 SP
- (5660) 1974 MA
- (5693) 1993 EA
- 5731 Zeus
- 5786 Talos
- (5828) 1991 AM
- (6037) 1988 EG
- (6047) 1991 TB1
- (6053) 1993 BW3
- 6063 Jason
- (6455) 1992 HE
- 6489 Golevka
- (6611) 1993 VW
- (7025) 1993 QA
- 7092 Cadmus
- (7335) 1989 JA
- (7341) 1991 VK
- (7350) 1993 VA
- (7482) 1994 PC1
- (7753) 1988 XB
- (7888) 1993 UC
- (7889) 1994 LX
- (8014) 1990 MF
- (8035) 1992 TB
- (8176) 1991 WA
- (8201) 1994 AH2
- (8507) 1991 CB1
- (8566) 1996 EN
- (9058) 1992 JB
- 9162 Kwiila
- (9202) 1993 PB
- (9856) 1991 EE
- (10145) 1994 CK1
- (10165) 1995 BL2
- (10636) 1998 QK56
- 11066 Sigurd
- 11311 Peleus
- (11405) 1999 CV3
- 11885 Summanus
- (12538) 1998 OH
- 12923 Zephyr
- 13651 Wugang
- 14827 Hypnos
- (16816) 1997 UF9
- (16834) 1997 WU22
- (16960) 1998 QS52
- (17181) 1999 UM3
- (17182) 1999 VU
- (17188) 1999 WC2
- (20236) 1998 BZ7
- (20425) 1998 VD35
- (20429) 1998 YN1
- (20826) 2000 UV13
- (22753) 1998 WT
- (22771) 1999 CU3
- (23187) 2000 PN9
- (24443) 2000 OG
- (24445) 2000 PM8
- 24761 Ahau
- 25143 Itokawa
- (25330) 1999 KV4
- (26379) 1999 HZ1
- (26663) 2000 XK47
- (27002) 1998 DV9
- (29075) 1950 DA
- (30825) 1990 TG1
- (30997) 1995 UO5
- (31662) 1999 HP11
- (31669) 1999 JT6
- (35396) 1997 XF11
- (35670) 1998 SU27
- (36236) 1999 VV
- (36284) 2000 DM8
- (37638) 1993 VB
- 37655 Illapa
- 38086 Beowulf
- (38239) 1999 OR3
- (40267) 1999 GJ4
- (41429) 2000 GE2
- (42286) 2001 TN41
- (52340) 1992 SY
- (52750) 1998 KK17
- (52760) 1998 ML14
- (52762) 1998 MT24
- (53319) 1999 JM8
- (53409) 1999 LU7
- (53426) 1999 SL5
- (53429) 1999 TF5
- (53550) 2000 BF19
- (53789) 2000 ED104
- (55532) 2001 WG2
- (65690) 1991 DG
- (65717) 1993 BX3
- (65733) 1993 PC
- 65803 Didymos
- (65909) 1998 FH12
- (66008) 1998 QH2
- (66063) 1998 RO1
- (66253) 1999 GT3
- (67381) 2000 OL8
- (67399) 2000 PJ6
- (68216) 2001 CV26
- (68267) 2001 EA16
- (68346) 2001 KZ66
- (68348) 2001 LO7
- (68372) 2001 PM9
- (68548) 2001 XR31
- 69230 Hermes
- (85640) 1998 OX4
- (374158) 2004 UL
- (386454) 2008 XM
- 2007 WD5
- 2003 BR47
- 2005 HC4
- (394130) 2006 HY51
- 2008 FF5

== Outer grazers ==
- 132 Aethra
- 323 Brucia
- 391 Ingeborg
- 475 Ocllo
- 512 Taurinensis
- 699 Hela
- 1009 Sirene
- 1011 Laodamia
- 1065 Amundsenia
- 1131 Porzia
- 1134 Kepler
- 1139 Atami
- 1170 Siva
- 1198 Atlantis
- 1204 Renzia
- 1235 Schorria
- 1293 Sonja
- 1310 Villigera
- 1316 Kasan
- 1374 Isora
- 1468 Zomba
- 1474 Beira
- 1508 Kemi
- 1565 Lemaître
- 1593 Fagnes
- 1640 Nemo
- 1656 Suomi
- 1727 Mette
- 1747 Wright
- 1750 Eckert
- 2035 Stearns
- 2044 Wirt
- 2055 Dvořák
- 2064 Thomsen
- 2074 Shoemaker
- 2077 Kiangsu
- 2078 Nanking
- 2099 Öpik
- 2204 Lyyli
- 2253 Espinette
- 2423 Ibarruri
- 2449 Kenos
- 2577 Litva
- 2744 Birgitta
- 2937 Gibbs
- 2968 Iliya
- 3040 Kozai
- 3163 Randi
- 3198 Wallonia
- 3216 Harrington
- 3255 Tholen
- 3267 Glo
- 3270 Dudley
- 3287 Olmstead
- 3343 Nedzel
- 3392 Setouchi
- 3397 Leyla
- 3401 Vanphilos
- 3402 Wisdom
- 3416 Dorrit
- 3443 Leetsungdao
- 3496 Arieso
- 3581 Alvarez
- 3635 Kreutz
- 3674 Erbisbühl
- 3737 Beckman
- 3800 Karayusuf
- 3854 George
- 3858 Dorchester
- 3873 Roddy
- 3920 Aubignan
- 4142 Dersu-Uzala
- 4205 David Hughes
- 4276 Clifford
- 4435 Holt
- 4451 Grieve
- 4558 Janesick
- 4910 Kawasato
- 4995 Griffin
- 5038 Overbeek
- 5066 Garradd
- 5201 Ferraz-Mello
- 5230 Asahina
- 5246 Migliorini
- 5251 Bradwood
- 5253 Fredclifford
- 5275 Zdislava
- 5335 Damocles
- 5349 Paulharris
- 5392 Parker
- (5510) 1988 RF7
- 5585 Parks
- 5621 Erb
- 5641 McCleese
- 5642 Bobbywilliams
- 5649 Donnashirley
- 5682 Beresford
- 5720 Halweaver
- 5738 Billpickering
- 5817 Robertfrazer
- 5870 Baltimore
- 5892 Milesdavis
- 5929 Manzano
- 5999 Plescia
- 6041 Juterkilian
- 6042 Cheshirecat
- 6141 Durda
- 6170 Levasseur
- 6172 Prokofeana
- 6183 Viscome
- 6249 Jennifer
- 6261 Chione
- 6263 Druckmüller
- 6386 Keithnoll
- 6411 Tamaga
- 6446 Lomberg
- 6444 Ryuzin
- (6454) 1991 UG1
- 6485 Wendeesther
- 6487 Tonyspear
- (6490) 1991 NR2
- 6500 Kodaira
- 6523 Clube
- 6585 O'Keefe
- 6847 Kunz-Hallstein
- (6874) 1994 JO1
- 6909 Levison
- 7002 Bronshten
- 7079 Baghdad
- 7267 Victormeen
- 7304 Namiki
- 7330 Annelemaître
- 7345 Happer
- 7369 Gavrilin
- 7445 Trajanus
- (7467) 1989 WQ1
- 7505 Furusho
- 7660 Alexanderwilson
- 7723 Lugger
- 7778 Markrobinson
- 7816 Hanoi
- 7818 Muirhead
- (7870) 1987 UP2
- 8251 Isogai
- 8256 Shenzhou
- 8355 Masuo
- 8373 Stephengould
- 8444 Popovich
- 8651 Alineraynal
- 8722 Schirra
- (9068) 1993 OD
- 9082 Leonardmartin
- (9292) 1982 UE2
- 9551 Kazi
- 9564 Jeffwynn
- (9572) 1988 RS6
- 9671 Hemera
- 9767 Midsomer Norton
- (9773) 1993 MG1
- 9881 Sampson
- (9992) 1997 TG19
- 10051 Albee
- 10502 Armaghobs
- (10548) 1992 PJ2
- (10578) 1995 LH
- 10737 Brück
- 10984 Gispen
- 11152 Oomine
- (11318) 1994 XZ4
- 11466 Katharinaotto
- 11836 Eileen
- (12009) 1996 UE
- (12198) 1980 PJ1
- (12390) 1994 WB1
- (12520) 1998 HV78
- (13091) 1992 PT3
- (13153) 1995 QC3
- 13551 Gadsden
- (13819) 1999 SX5
- 13920 Montecorvino
- (14017) 1994 NS
- (14211) 1999 NT1
- (14222) 1999 WS1
- 14223 Dolby
- 14309 Defoy
- (14461) 1993 FL54
- (14581) 1998 RT4
- (14653) 1998 YV11
- (14982) 1997 TH19
- 15609 Kosmaczewski
- 15673 Chetaev
- (15700) 1987 QD
- (15778) 1993 NH
- 15790 Keizan
- 16142 Leung
- (16143) 1999 XK142
- 16465 Basilrowe
- (16474) 1990 QG3
- 16529 Dangoldin
- 16588 Johngee
- (16591) 1992 SY17
- (16635) 1993 QO
- 16724 Ullilotzmann
- (16851) 1997 YU1
- (16868) 1998 AK8
- 16958 Klaasen
- 17435 di Giovanni
- 17493 Wildcat
- 17555 Kenkennedy
- 17640 Mount Stromlo
- 17744 Jodiefoster
- (18181) 2000 QD34
- (18195) 2000 QG116
- 18284 Tsereteli
- 18398 Bregenz
- 18499 Showalter
- (18620) 1998 DS10
- (18726) 1998 KC2
- 18751 Yualexandrov
- (18899) 2000 JQ2
- (18916) 2000 OG44
- (18919) 2000 OJ52
- 19080 Martínfierro
- 19127 Olegefremov
- (19388) 1998 DQ3
- (19402) 1998 EG14
- (19877) 9086 P-L
- (19958) 1985 RN4
- 20037 Duke
- (20062) 1993 QB3
- (20137) 1996 PX8
- 20187 Janapittichova
- (20446) 1999 JB80
- (20691) 1999 VY72
- (20786) 2000 RG62
- (20860) 2000 VS34
- (20958) A900 MA
- 21001 Trogrlic
- (21028) 1989 TO
- (21030) 1989 TZ11
- (21056) 1991 CA1
- 21104 Sveshnikov
- (21183) 1994 EO2
- (21228) 1995 SC
- (21788) 1999 SZ5
- (21893) 1999 VL4
- 21966 Hamadori
- 22168 Weissflog
- 22283 Pytheas
- 22385 Fujimoriboshi
- 22449 Ottijeff
- (22601) 1998 HD124
- (22807) 1999 RK7
- (22844) 1999 RU111
- (23250) 2000 WQ181
- (23726) 1998 HG48
- 23738 van Zyl
- (23983) 1999 NS11
- (24029) 1999 RT198
- (24143) 1999 VY124
- (24242) 1999 XY100
- 24495 Degroff
- 24643 MacCready
- 24654 Fossett
- (24682) 1990 BH
- (24693) 1990 SB2
- (24806) 1994 RH9
- (24809) 1994 TW3
- (24814) 1994 VW1
- (24819) 1994 XY4
- (24883) 1996 VG9
- (24970) 1998 FC12
- (25037) 1998 QC37
- (25362) 1999 TH24
- (25974) 2001 FF43
- (26050) 3167 T-2
- 26074 Carlwirtz
- (26120) 1991 VZ2
- (26129) 1993 DK
- (26189) 1997 AX12
- (26209) 1997 RD1
- (26385) 1999 RN20
- 26471 Tracybecker
- (26822) 1988 RG13
- 26858 Misterrogers
- 26879 Haines
- (27057) 1998 SP33
- (27089) 1998 UE15
- (27351) 2000 DO73
- 27657 Berkhey
- (27995) 1997 WL2
- (28017) 1997 YV13
- (28085) 1998 QO98
- (28203) 1998 XL48
- (28565) 2000 EO58
- (29180) 1990 SW1
- (29407) 1996 UW
- (29451) 1997 RM1
- (29566) 1998 FK5
- (29780) 1999 CJ50
- (30105) 2000 FO3
- (30555) 2001 OM59
- (30717) 1937 UD
- (30765) 1981 EJ48
- 30767 Chriskraft
- (30771) 1986 PO2
- 30775 Lattu
- 30785 Greeley
- 30786 Karkoschka
- (30800) 1989 ST
- (30856) 1991 XE
- 30963 Mount Banzan
- (31076) 1996 XH1
- 31098 Frankhill
- (31180) 1997 YX3
- (31318) 1998 GQ10
- (31320) 1998 HX2
- (31367) 1998 WB9
- 31415 Fenucci
- (31832) 2000 AP59
- (31843) 2000 CQ80
- (31845) 2000 DK17
- (31869) 2000 EF101
- (31881) 2000 FL15
- (31895) 2000 FX44
- (31913) 2000 GM56
- (32039) 2000 JO23
- (32122) 2000 LD10
- (32575) 2001 QY78
- (32581) 2001 QW98
- (32827) 1992 DF1
- 32890 Schwob
- 32897 Curtharris
- (32910) 1994 TE15
- (33060) 1997 VY
- (33073) 1997 WU16
- 33330 Barèges
- (33836) 2000 FB39
- (33865) 2000 JX15
- (33881) 2000 JK66
- (34048) 2000 OR35
- (34706) 2001 OP83
- (34755) 2001 QW120
- (34759) 2001 QL151
- 34817 Shiominemoto
- 35056 Cullers
- (35368) 1997 UB8
- (35709) 1999 FR28
- (36282) 2000 CT98
- (36771) 2000 RD97
- (36779) 2000 SW1
- (37152) 2000 VV56
- (37308) 2001 OP16
- (37314) 2001 QP
- (37359) 2001 UM17
- (37367) 2001 VC
- (37378) 2001 VU76
- (37479) 1130 T-1
- (37568) 1989 TP
- 37596 Cotahuasi
- (37671) 1994 UY11
- (37802) 1997 XD11
- (38063) 1999 FH
- (38074) 1999 GX19
- (38181) 1999 JG124
- (38647) 2000 OW8
- (38683) 2000 QQ7
- (39096) 2000 WE1
- (39235) 2000 YH55
- (39489) 1981 EU6
- (39561) 1992 QA
- (39702) 1996 TZ10
- 39741 Komm
- (40245) 1998 WO7
- (40271) 1999 JT
- (40315) 1999 LS
- (40430) 1999 RL28
- (40468) 1999 RF46
- (40719) 1999 SZ2
- (41074) 1999 VL40
- (41223) 1999 XD16
- (41434) 2000 GB82
- (41464) 2000 OL22
- (41475) 2000 PR13
- (41503) 2000 QG148
- (41574) 2000 SQ1
- (41577) 2000 SV2
- (41588) 2000 SC46
- (41774) 2000 VR44
- (42501) 1992 YC
- 42531 McKenna
- 42609 Daubechies
- (42805) 1999 JU1
- (42811) 1999 JN81
- (42887) 1999 RV155
- (43017) 1999 VA2
- (43369) 2000 WP3
- (44010) 1997 UH11
- (44168) 1998 JJ4
- (44200) 1998 MJ25
- (44619) 1999 RO42
- (45074) 1999 XA38
- (45164) 1999 XK127
- (45251) 1999 YN
- (45764) 2000 LV
- (46433) 2002 JQ67
- (46598) 1993 FT2
- (46771) 1998 HM7
- (46773) 1998 HZ12
- (46780) 1998 HH52
- (46818) 1998 MZ24
- (47035) 1998 WS
- (47145) 1999 RN11
- (47199) 1999 TY204
- (47343) 1999 XL45
- (47576) 2000 AW172
- (47581) 2000 AN178
- (47588) 2000 AM201
- (47648) 2000 CA40
- (47834) 2000 EN114
- (48338) 2002 PV27
- (48450) 1991 NA
- (48468) 1991 SS1
- (48570) 1994 EA2
- (48621) 1995 OC
- (48864) 1998 HK43
- (49385) 1998 XA12
- (49664) 1999 MV
- (49952) 1999 XH212
- (50143) 2000 AB132
- (50354) 2000 CX70
- (50867) 2000 GM4
- (51075) 2000 GG162
- (51157) 2000 HB57
- (51356) 2000 RY76
- (51773) 2001 MV
- (52297) 1991 CH2
- (52310) 1991 VJ
- (52317) 1992 BC1
- 52384 Elenapanko
- (52439) 1994 QL
- (52453) 1994 WC
- (52722) 1998 GK
- (52730) 1998 HN4
- (52800) 1998 QT60
- (53431) 1999 UQ10
- (53432) 1999 UT55
- (54013) 2000 GA97
- (54697) 2001 FA70
- (54718) 2001 HB61
- (54754) 2001 KJ56
- (55043) 2001 QL59
- (55333) 2001 SZ117
- (55380) 2001 SB264
- (55401) 2001 SX316
- (55757) 1991 XN
- (55760) 1992 BL1
- (55825) 1995 SD4
- (55969) 1998 KH56
- (56950) 2000 SA2
- (57004) 2000 SP349
- (57047) 2001 LG1
- (57878) 2001 YZ148
- (57924) 2002 FO28
- (58023) 2002 VR40
- (58046) 2002 XA14
- (58050) 2002 YA
- (58070) 1034 T-2
- (58141) 1981 UW22
- (58149) 1987 SX11
- (58175) 1990 SE15
- (58325) 1994 RE11
- (58683) 1998 AJ10
- (58980) 1998 RG47
- (59490) 1999 JD4
- (59836) 1999 RN44
- (59979) 1999 SV5
- (60187) 1999 VL23
- (60216) 1999 VG82
- (60375) 2000 AY146
- (60396) 2000 AG243
- (60689) 2000 GG37
- (60733) 2000 GL80
- (60735) 2000 GF82
- (60886) 2000 JB10
- (60924) 2000 JF44
- (61256) 2000 OT25
- (61343) 2000 PC5
- (61416) 2000 QL12
- (61550) 2000 QK70
- (61799) 2000 QC184
- (62042) 2000 RF65
- (62047) 2000 RE66
- (62268) 2000 SQ90
- (62730) 2000 TE59
- (63160) 2000 YN8
- (63164) 2000 YU14
- (63341) 2001 FD77
- (63583) 2001 QP31
- (65335) 2002 LR58
- (65425) 2002 TL129
- (65433) 2002 TX238
- (65682) 1990 QU2
- (65742) 1993 TY18
- (65757) 1994 FV
- (65776) 1995 SW3
- 65784 Naderayama
- (65808) 1996 LO1
- (65817) 1996 TC33
- (65999) 1998 ND
- (66269) 1999 JN3
- (66280) 1999 JF12
- (66294) 1999 JS27
- (66358) 1999 JW87
- (66419) 1999 NR13
- 66458 Romaplanetario
- (67284) 2000 GD1
- (67473) 2000 RH6
- (67502) 2000 RE44
- (67522) 2000 RB79
- (67729) 2000 UQ23
- (67865) 2000 WG23
- (67930) 2000 WP122
- (67943) 2000 WP151
- (68134) 2001 AT18
- (68569) 2001 YE3
- (68944) 2002 PQ130
- (69045) 2002 XN59
- (69117) 2003 EX2
- (69239) 1978 XT
- 69260 Tonyjudt
- (69274) 1989 UZ1
- (69307) 1992 ON
- 69311 Russ
- (69350) 1993 YP
- (69466) 1996 VZ5
- (69701) 1998 HP49
- (70055) 1999 JN6
- (70056) 1999 JJ8
- (70111) 1999 LM7
- (71997) 2000 WD178
- (72044) 2000 YH5
- (72204) 2000 YV133
- (72569) 2001 EC13
- 73534 Liviasavioli
- (73575) 4789 P-L
- (73669) 1981 WL2
- (73673) 1986 RX1
- (73681) 1989 TL18
- (73735) 1993 QE3
- (73865) 1997 AW
- (74217) 1998 RB73
- (74523) 1999 GA6
- (74539) 1999 JD15
- (74558) 1999 LT13
- (74561) 1999 LE18
- (74564) 1999 NY1
- (74576) 1999 NG25
- (74644) 1999 RK63
- (74721) 1999 RH167
- (74779) 1999 RF241
- (74789) 1999 SY5
- (74823) 1999 TD15
- (74839) 1999 TZ34
- (74998) 1999 TV276
- (75015) 1999 UW4
- (75017) 1999 UE5
- (75079) 1999 VN24
- (75303) 1999 XQ35
- (75409) 1999 XR104
- (75412) 1999 XJ108
- (75567) 2000 AK1
- (75933) 2000 CB75
- (76789) 2000 LG16
- (76828) 2000 SL161
- (76978) 2001 BY60
- 77971 Donnolo
- (78545) 2002 RT121
- (78587) 2002 SZ12
- (79137) 1991 PD15
- (79150) 1992 UR7
- (79219) 1994 LN
- (79512) 1998 KE3
- (79558) 1998 QE51
- (79571) 1998 QG92
- (79576) 1998 QG98
- (79611) 1998 RC52
- (79721) 1998 SE112
- (80023) 1999 JY1
- (80098) 1999 MV1
- (80107) 1999 RG29
- (80250) 1999 WW9
- (80356) 1999 XM124
- (80366) 1999 XA142
- (80593) 2000 AG144
- (82059) 2000 UM30
- (82085) 2001 CL20
- (82105) 2001 FG26
- (82124) 2001 FO78
- (82233) 2001 JF1
- (82474) 2001 OB23
- (82676) 2001 PV23
- (82913) 2001 QN103
- (83120) 2001 QP246
- (83988) 2002 LC34
- (83992) 2002 MG3
- (84667) 2002 VO82
- (85118) 1971 UU
- 85119 Hannieschaft
- 85158 Phyllistrapp
- (85165) 1988 TV2
- 85185 Lederman
- (85235) 1993 JA
- (85274) 1994 GH
- (85372) 1996 EO12
- (85383) 1996 MS
- (85546) 1997 XH1
- (85762) 1998 TH4
- (85848) 1998 YP29
- (86025) 1999 LX3
- (86194) 1999 SD2
- (86212) 1999 TG21
- (86373) 1999 YK
- (86401) 2000 AF143
- (86534) 2000 DT98
- (86608) 2000 EK85
- (86626) 2000 EV124
- (86730) 2000 GY37
- (86964) 2000 JV2
- (87005) 2000 JJ52
- (87035) 2000 KE2
- (88191) 2000 YK21
- (88412) 2001 QN28
- (88424) 2001 QC61
- (88453) 2001 QF91
- (88609) 2001 QP296
- (88938) 2001 TR33
- (88954) 2001 TE42
- (89137) 2001 UD17
- (89365) 2001 VZ81
- (89454) 2001 XG
- (89486) 2001 XL31
- (89566) 2001 XZ103
- (89766) 2002 AO62
- (89776) 2002 AL90
- (90281) 2003 DQ15
- (90791) 1994 PG32
- (90916) 1997 LR
- (90943) 1997 UX2
- (91044) 1998 FX15
- (91210) 1998 XS96
- (91227) 1999 BG9
- (92158) 1999 XW141
- (92278) 2000 CB110
- (92359) 2000 HC24
- (93038) 2000 RL104
- (93040) 2000 SG
- (93751) 2000 WH1
- (93768) 2000 WN22
- (94210) 2001 BK33
- (94396) 2001 SN213
- (94623) 2001 WD2
- (94891) 2001 YC5
- (95087) 2002 AQ89
- (95696) 2002 JU75
- (95711) 2003 AK
- (95786) 2003 FN7
- (96006) 2004 NE27
- (96011) 2004 PD6
- (96080) 7649 P-L

== Mars-crossers ==
- 433 Eros
- 719 Albert
- 887 Alinda
- 1036 Ganymed
- 1221 Amor
- 1580 Betulia
- 1627 Ivar
- 1915 Quetzálcoatl
- 1916 Boreas
- 1917 Cuyo
- 1943 Anteros
- 1980 Tezcatlipoca
- 2059 Baboquivari
- 2061 Anza
- 2202 Pele
- 2335 James
- 2368 Beltrovata
- 2608 Seneca
- 2629 Rudra
- 3102 Krok
- 3122 Florence
- 3199 Nefertiti
- 3271 Ul
- 3288 Seleucus
- 3352 McAuliffe
- 3551 Verenia
- 3552 Don Quixote
- 3553 Mera
- 3691 Bede
- (3757) Anagolay
- 3833 Calingasta
- 3908 Nyx
- (3988) Huma
- 4055 Magellan
- 4401 Aditi
- 4487 Pocahontas
- 4503 Cleobulus
- 4587 Rees
- (4596) 1981 QB
- (4688) 1980 WF
- 4775 Hansen
- 4954 Eric
- 4957 Brucemurray
- 5324 Lyapunov
- 5332 Davidaguilar
- 5370 Taranis
- (5407) 1992 AX
- (5587) 1990 SB
- 5620 Jasonwheeler
- (5626) 1991 FE
- (5646) 1990 TR
- 5653 Camarillo
- (5732) 1988 WC
- 5751 Zao
- 5797 Bivoj
- (5836) 1993 MF
- 5863 Tara
- (5867) 1988 RE
- 5869 Tanith
- 5879 Almeria
- 6050 Miwablock
- 6130 Hutton
- (6178) 1986 DA
- 6318 Cronkite
- (6322) 1991 CQ
- 6456 Golombek
- (6491) 1991 OA
- 6564 Asher
- 6569 Ondaatje
- 7088 Ishtar
- 7096 Napier
- (7236) 1987 PA
- 7336 Saunders
- 7358 Oze
- (7474) 1992 TC
- 7480 Norwan
- 7604 Kridsadaporn
- (7839) 1994 ND
- (7977) 1977 QQ5
- 8013 Gordonmoore
- 8034 Akka
- (8037) 1993 HO1
- (8567) 1996 HW1
- 8709 Kadlu
- 9172 Abhramu
- (9400) 1994 TW1
- 9950 ESA
- 9969 Braille
- (10150) 1994 PN
- 10295 Hippolyta
- 10416 Kottler
- (10860) 1995 LE
- (11054) 1991 FA
- 11284 Belenus
- (11398) 1998 YP11
- 12008 Kandrup
- 13553 Masaakikoyama
- (14402) 1991 DB
- 15745 Yuliya
- 16064 Davidharvey
- (16636) 1993 QP
- (16657) 1993 UB
- 16695 Terryhandley
- 16912 Rhiannon
- (17274) 2000 LC16
- 18106 Blume
- (18109) 2000 NG11
- (18172) 2000 QL7
- (18514) 1996 TE11
- (18736) 1998 NU
- (18882) 1999 YN4
- (19356) 1997 GH3
- (19764) 2000 NF5
- (20086) 1994 LW
- (20255) 1998 FX2
- 20460 Robwhiteley
- (20790) 2000 SE45
- 21088 Chelyabinsk
- (21277) 1996 TO5
- (23183) 2000 OY21
- (23548) 1994 EF2
- (23606) 1996 AS1
- (23621) 1996 PA
- (23714) 1998 EC3
- (24447) 2000 QY1
- (24475) 2000 VN2
- (25872) 2000 MV1
- (25916) 2001 CP44
- (26166) 1995 QN3
- (26310) 1998 TX6
- (26760) 2001 KP41
- (26817) 1987 QB
- (27031) 1998 RO4
- (27234) 1999 RC2
- (27346) 2000 DN8
- (30854) 1991 VB
- (31210) 1998 BX7
- (31221) 1998 BP26
- (31345) 1998 PG
- (31346) 1998 PB1
- (32906) 1994 RH
- (34613) 2000 UR13
- (35432) 1998 BG9
- (36017) 1999 ND43
- (36183) 1999 TX16
- (37329) 2001 QW108
- (37336) 2001 RM
- (37384) 2001 WU1
- (38066) 1999 FO19
- (38071) 1999 GU3
- (38091) 1999 JT3
- 39557 Gielgud
- (39565) 1992 SL
- (39572) 1993 DQ1
- (39796) 1997 TD
- (40263) 1999 FQ5
- (40310) 1999 KU4
- (40329) 1999 ML
- (41440) 2000 HZ23
- (48603) 1995 BC2
- (52689) 1998 FF2
- (52761) 1998 MN14
- (52768) 1998 OR2
- (53110) 1999 AR7
- (53430) 1999 TY16
- (53435) 1999 VM40
- (54401) 2000 LM
- (54660) 2000 UJ1
- (54686) 2001 DU8
- (54690) 2001 EB
- (54789) 2001 MZ7
- (65674) 1988 SM
- (65706) 1992 NA
- (65996) 1998 MX5
- (66251) 1999 GJ2
- (66272) 1999 JW6
- (66959) 1999 XO35
- (68063) 2000 YJ66
- (68350) 2001 MK3
- (68359) 2001 OZ13
- (85182) 1991 AQ
- (85275) 1994 LY
- (85490) 1997 SE5
- 85585 Mjolnir
- (85628) 1998 KV2
- (85640) 1998 OX4
- (85709) 1998 SG36
- (85713) 1998 SS49
- (85774) 1998 UT18
- (85804) 1998 WQ5
- (85818) 1998 XM4
- (85839) 1998 YO4
- (85867) 1999 BY9
- (85938) 1999 DJ4
- (86039) 1999 NC43
- (86067) 1999 RM28
- (86324) 1999 WA2
- (86326) 1999 WK13
- (86666) 2000 FL10
- (86819) 2000 GK137
- (86829) 2000 GR146
- (86878) 2000 HD24
- (87025) 2000 JT66
- (87311) 2000 QJ1
- (88188) 2000 XH44
- (88254) 2001 FM129
- (88263) 2001 KQ1
- (88264) 2001 KN20
- (88959) 2001 TZ44
- (89136) 2001 US16
- (89355) 2001 VS78
- (89830) 2002 CE
- (89958) 2002 LY45
- (89959) 2002 NT7
- (90075) 2002 VU94
- (90147) 2002 YK14
- (90373) 2003 SZ219
- (90416) 2003 YK118

== See also ==
- List of Mercury-crossing minor planets
- List of Venus-crossing minor planets
- List of Earth-crossing minor planets
- List of Jupiter-crossing minor planets
