= (38063) 1999 FH =

Asteroid in the inner asteroid belt

Discovery
- Discovered by: K. Korlević; M. Jurić
- Discovery site: Višnjan Obs.
- Discovery date: 16 March 1999

Designations
- Alternative designations: 2000 SY_{275}
- Minor planet category: Mars-crosser

Orbital characteristics
- Epoch 4 September 2017 (JD 2458000.5)
- Uncertainty parameter 0
- Observation arc: 25.07 yr (9,158 days)
- Aphelion: 3.0288 AU
- Perihelion: 1.6559 AU
- Semi-major axis: 2.3424 AU
- Eccentricity: 0.2931
- Orbital period (sidereal): 3.59 yr (1,309 days)
- Mean anomaly: 324.91°
- Mean motion: 0° 16^{m} 29.64^{s} / day
- Inclination: 11.880°
- Longitude of ascending node: 193.25°
- Argument of perihelion: 108.31°

Physical characteristics
- Dimensions: 3.395±0.703 km 3.92 km (calculated); 4.17±0.42 km
- Synodic rotation period: 990±50 h (Note: Robert Stephens light-curve plot of (38063) with a rotation period 990±50 hours and a brightness amplitude of 0.55 mag)
- Geometric albedo: 0.176±0.035; 0.20 (assumed); 0.287±0.172
- Spectral type: L · S
- Absolute magnitude (H): 14.00 · 14.4 · 14.50±0.13

(38063) 1999 FH is a rare-type asteroid from the inner regions of the asteroid belt, classified as Mars-crosser and exceptionally slow rotator, approximately 4 kilometers in diameter. It was discovered on 16 March 1999, by Croatian astronomers Korado Korlević and Mario Jurić at Višnjan Observatory in Croatia.

== Orbit and classification ==
1999 FH orbits the Sun at a distance of 1.7–3.0 AU once every 3 years and 7 months (1,309 days). Its orbit has an eccentricity of 0.29 and an inclination of 12° with respect to the ecliptic. A first precovery was taken at Steward Observatory in 1992, extending the body's observation arc by 7 years prior to its official discovery observation.

== Physical characteristics ==
SDSS photometry characterized 1999 FH as a rare and reddish L-type, which belong to the larger complex of stony asteroids.

=== Slow rotator and tumbler ===
In September 2014, American astronomer Robert Stephens obtained a rotational lightcurve from photometric observations taken at the Center for Solar System Studies (CS3, U81) in California. It gave an exceptionally long rotation period of 990±50 hours with a brightness amplitude of 0.55 magnitude (U=2), which makes it one of the slowest rotators known to exist. It is also a suspected tumbling asteroid, which show a non-principal axis rotation.

=== Diameter and albedo ===
According to the survey carried out by NASA's Wide-field Infrared Survey Explorer with its subsequent NEOWISE mission, 1999 FH measures 3.395 and 4.17 kilometers in diameter and its surface has an albedo of 0.287 and 0.176, respectively. The Collaborative Asteroid Lightcurve Link assumes a standard albedo for stony asteroids of 0.20 and calculates a diameter of 3.92 kilometers with an absolute magnitude of 14.4.

== Numbering and naming ==
This minor planet was numbered by the Minor Planet Center on 28 March 2002. As of 2018, it has not been named.
