= 21088 Chelyabinsk =

Stony asteroid and near-Earth object of the Amor group

Discovery
- Discovered by: E. W. Elst
- Discovery site: La Silla Obs.
- Discovery date: 30 January 1992

Designations
- Named after: Chelyabinsk (city and meteor)
- Alternative designations: 1992 BL_{2}
- Minor planet category: NEO · Amor; Mars-crosser

Orbital characteristics
- Epoch 4 September 2017 (JD 2458000.5)
- Uncertainty parameter 0
- Observation arc: 27.41 yr (10,012 days)
- Aphelion: 2.1135 AU
- Perihelion: 1.2996 AU
- Semi-major axis: 1.7065 AU
- Eccentricity: 0.2384
- Orbital period (sidereal): 2.23 yr (814 days)
- Mean anomaly: 318.92°
- Mean motion: 0° 26^{m} 31.56^{s} / day
- Inclination: 38.455°
- Longitude of ascending node: 297.85°
- Argument of perihelion: 27.133°
- Earth MOID: 0.3083 AU · 120.1 LD

Physical characteristics
- Dimensions: 2.79±0.10 km 3.46±0.25 km 4.23 km (taken); 4.231±0.113 km 4.232 km
- Synodic rotation period: 22.426±0.02 h (Note: Pravec (2002 and 2004) web: rotation period of 22.49 and 22.426±0.02 hours, both with a brightness amplitude of 0.13 mag. Summary figures of (21088) Chelyabinsk at the LCDB and Pravec, P.; Wolf, M.; Sarounova, L. (2002/2004)) (Note: Lightcurve plot by Pravec from 7 June 2005 with period of 22.431 hours. Data sheet from unpublished observations at Ondrejov Asteroid Photometry Project); 22.49 h
- Geometric albedo: 0.1794; 0.206; 0.257±0.038; 0.26±0.32; 0.37±0.06
- Spectral type: Q · L · S B–V = 0.855±0.073; V–R = 0.464±0.015; V–I = 0.910±0.032
- Absolute magnitude (H): 13.86±0.14 (R) · 14.00 · 14.2 · 14.29±0.24 · 14.3 · 14.35±0.149 · 14.40

21088 Chelyabinsk (provisional designation 1992 BL_{2}) is a stony asteroid and near-Earth object of the Amor group, approximately 4 kilometers in diameter. It was discovered on 30 January 1992, by Belgian astronomer Eric Elst at ESO's La Silla Observatory in northern Chile. The asteroid was named after the Russian city of Chelyabinsk and for its spectacular Chelyabinsk meteor event in 2013. It is not related to the Chelyabinsk impactor.

== Classification and orbit ==
Chelyabinsk orbits the Sun at a distance of 1.3–2.1 AU once every 2 years and 3 months (814 days). Its orbit has an eccentricity of 0.24 and an inclination of 38° with respect to the ecliptic. A first precovery was taken during the Digitized Sky Survey at the Australia Siding Spring Observatory in January 1990, extending the asteroid's observation arc by 2 years prior to its official discovery at La Silla.

=== Close approaches ===
As a near-Earth object, Chelyabinsk has a low Earth minimum orbit intersection distance of 0.3083 AU (46,100,000 km), which translates into 120.1 lunar distances (LD). This is, however, far too large to make it a potentially hazardous asteroid, which have intersection distances of less than 20 LD. It also crosses the orbit of Mars at 1.666 AU which makes it a Mars-crossing asteroid. In August 2142, it will approach Mars at 0.0986 AU (14,800,000 km).

== Physical characteristics ==
Chelyabinsk has been characterized as both a Q-type and L-type asteroid. It is also a generically assumed S-type asteroid.

=== Lightcurves ===
Two rotational light-curves of Chelyabinsk were obtained by Czech astronomer Petr Pravec at Ondřejov Observatory in December 2002 and September 2004, respectively. They gave a rotation period of 22.490 and 22.426 hours, each with a brightness variation of 0.13 magnitude (U=n.a./3-).

=== Diameter and albedo ===
According to the survey carried out by the NEOWISE mission of NASA's Wide-field Infrared Survey Explorer (WISE), Chelyabinsk measures between 2.79 and 4.2 kilometers in diameter and its surface has an albedo between 0.21 and 0.37, while observations by the Japanese Akari satellite gave an albedo of 0.26 and a diameter of 3.5 kilometers. The Collaborative Asteroid Lightcurve Link adopts Petr Pravec's revised WISE results, that is, a diameter of 4.23 kilometers and an albedo of 0.179 based on an absolute magnitude of 14.35.

== Naming ==
This minor planet is named after the Russian city Chelyabinsk, located in the Ural region. The city is well known for the Chelyabinsk meteor, a 20-meter sized, extremely bright fireball that exploded to the south of the city at an altitude of 30 kilometers on 15 February 2013. The indirect effects of the explosion injured more than 1,500 people. The official naming citation was published by the Minor Planet Center (MPC) on 21 August 2013 (M.P.C. 84674).

=== Erratum ===
Originally, the name "Chelyabinsk" was erroneously given by the MPC to the numerically similar asteroid (20188) 1997 AC_{18} on 22 July (M.P.C. 84379). The wrong designation 20188 Chelyabinsk was deleted in the subsequent publication of the Minor Planet Circulars on 21 August 2013 (M.P.C. 84385)
