= 1656 Suomi =

Asteroid

Discovery
- Discovered by: Y. Väisälä
- Discovery site: Turku Obs.
- Discovery date: 11 March 1942

Designations
- Named after: Finland (country)
- Alternative designations: 1942 EC · 1955 HL
- Minor planet category: Mars-crosser · Hungaria binary

Orbital characteristics
- Epoch 4 September 2017 (JD 2458000.5)
- Uncertainty parameter 0
- Observation arc: 75.24 years (27,480 days)
- Aphelion: 2.1093 AU
- Perihelion: 1.6456 AU
- Semi-major axis: 1.8774 AU
- Eccentricity: 0.1235
- Orbital period (sidereal): 2.57 yr (940 days)
- Mean anomaly: 174.69°
- Mean motion: 0° 22^{m} 59.16^{s} / day
- Inclination: 25.067°
- Longitude of ascending node: 175.57°
- Argument of perihelion: 287.44°
- Known satellites: 1 1.98+ km (> 0.26D_{s}/D_{p}; P: 57.92 h)
- Earth MOID: 0.7551 AU

Physical characteristics
- Mean diameter: 7.86±0.7 km (IRAS:3); 7.9 km
- Synodic rotation period: 2.42±0.02 h 2.583±0.004 h 2.5879±0.0002 h 2.5879±0.0003 h 2.59±0.01 h 62.16 h (wrong)
- Geometric albedo: 0.1556±0.032 (IRAS:3); 0.157
- Spectral type: Tholen = S · S
- Absolute magnitude (H): 12.9 · 12.97±0.31 · 13.13±0.11 · 13.146±0.1 · 13.16

1656 Suomi (prov. designation: 1942 EC) is a binary Hungaria asteroid and sizable Mars-crosser from the innermost regions of the asteroid belt. It was discovered on 11 March 1942, by Finnish astronomer Yrjö Väisälä at Turku Observatory in Southwest Finland, who named it "Suomi", the native name of Finland. The stony asteroid has a short rotation period of 2.6 hours and measures approximately 7.9 kilometers in diameter. In June 2020, a companion was discovered by Brian Warner, Robert Stephens and Alan Harris. The satellite measures more than 1.98 kilometers in diameter, about 26% of the primary, which it orbits once every 57.9 hours at an average distance of 30 kilometers.

== Orbit and classification ==
Suomi is a member of the Hungaria family, which form the innermost dense concentration of asteroids in the Solar System. It orbits the Sun at a distance of 1.6–2.1 AU once every 2 years and 7 months (940 days). Its orbit has an eccentricity of 0.12 and an inclination of 25° with respect to the ecliptic.

It is also classified as a Mars-crossing asteroid, since its perihelion – the point in its orbit, where it is nearest to the Sun – is less than the average orbital distance of the planet Mars (1.666 AU). Suomi's observation arc begins on the preceding night of its discovery, with an observation taken at Johannesburg Observatory on 10 March 1942.

== Naming ==
As with 1453 Fennia, this minor planet was named after Finland (Finnish: Suomi). The official naming citation was published by the Minor Planet Center on 20 February 1976 (M.P.C. 3932).

== Physical characteristics ==
In the Tholen taxonomy, Suomi is a stony S-type asteroid.

=== Diameter and albedo ===
According to the survey carried out by the Infrared Astronomical Satellite IRAS, Suomi measures 7.86 kilometers in diameter and its surface has an albedo of 0.156, making it one of the largest Mars crossing asteroid with a known diameter. The Collaborative Asteroid Lightcurve Link (CALL) agrees with IRAS, and adopts an albedo of 0.157 and a diameter of 7.9 kilometers with an absolute magnitude of 13.146.

=== Rotation period ===
Since 1991, a large number of rotational lightcurves of Suomi have been obtained from photometric observations (also see infobox). CALL adopts a rotation period of 2.583 hours with a brightness variation of 0.20 magnitude (U=3).
