= 1310 Villigera =

Mars-crossing asteroid

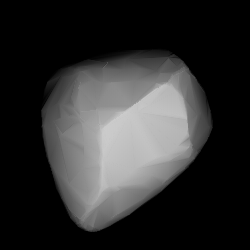
- Modelled shape of Villigera from its lightcurve

Discovery
- Discovered by: A. Schwassmann
- Discovery site: Bergedorf Obs.
- Discovery date: 28 February 1932

Designations
- Named after: Walther Villiger (Swiss astronomer)
- Alternative designations: 1932 DB · 1964 TC
- Minor planet category: Mars-crosser

Orbital characteristics
- Epoch 4 September 2017 (JD 2458000.5)
- Uncertainty parameter 0
- Observation arc: 85.34 yr (31,171 days)
- Aphelion: 3.2438 AU
- Perihelion: 1.5424 AU
- Semi-major axis: 2.3931 AU
- Eccentricity: 0.3555
- Orbital period (sidereal): 3.70 yr (1,352 days)
- Mean anomaly: 76.690°
- Mean motion: 0° 15^{m} 58.32^{s} / day
- Inclination: 21.071°
- Longitude of ascending node: 357.32°
- Argument of perihelion: 88.759°
- Mars MOID: 0.2634 AU

Physical characteristics
- Dimensions: 13.76±1.38 km 15.24 km (calculated)
- Synodic rotation period: 7.830±0.005 h (Note: Lightcurve plot of (1310) Villigera, Robert Koff, Thornton Observatory (713). Summary figures at LCDB); 7.83001±0.00005 h 7.834±0.001 h
- Geometric albedo: 0.20 (assumed); 0.245±0.049
- Spectral type: Tholen = S · S B–V = 0.905; U–B = 0.445
- Absolute magnitude (H): 11.45

1310 Villigera, provisional designation 1932 DB, is a stony asteroid and large Mars-crosser from the innermost regions of the asteroid belt, approximately 14 kilometers in diameter. It was discovered on 28 February 1932, by German astronomer Friedrich Schwassmann at Bergedorf Observatory in Hamburg, Germany. The asteroid was named after astronomer Walther Villiger.

== Orbit and classification ==
Villigera is a Mars-crossing asteroid, a dynamically unstable group between the main belt and the near-Earth populations, crossing the orbit of Mars at 1.666 AU. It orbits the Sun in the inner main-belt at a distance of 1.5–3.2 AU once every 3 years and 8 months (1,352 days). Its orbit has an eccentricity of 0.36 and an inclination of 21° with respect to the ecliptic. No precoveries were taken, and no prior identifications were made. The body's observation arc begins 10 days after its official discovery observation with its first used observation at Uccle Observatory.

== Physical characteristics ==
Villigera is a common S-type asteroid on the Tholen taxonomic scheme.

=== Lightcurves ===
In October 2001, a first rotational lightcurve of Villigera was obtained by astronomer Robert Koff at Thornton Observatory (713) in Colorado. Light curve analysis gave a well-defined rotation period of 7.830 hours with a brightness variation of 0.39 magnitude (U=3).

Photometric observations by astronomers René Roy, Raoul Behrend and Pierre Antonini in February 2006, gave a concurring period of 7.834 hours and an amplitude of 0.36 magnitude (U=3). In 2016, a modeled lightcurves using photometric data from various sources, rendered an identical period of 7.830 and a spin axis of (3.0°, 63°) in ecliptic coordinates.

=== Diameter and albedo ===
According to the survey carried out by NASA's Wide-field Infrared Survey Explorer with its subsequent NEOWISE mission, Villigera measures 13.76 kilometers in diameter and its surface has an albedo of 0.245. The Collaborative Asteroid Lightcurve Link assumes a standard albedo for stony asteroids of 0.20 and calculates a diameter of 15.24 kilometers, with an absolute magnitude of 11.45. Based on a generic magnitude-to-diameter conversion, Villigera measures between 13 and 30 kilometers for an albedo in the range of 0.05 to 0.25.

This makes Villigera one of the largest mid-sized Mars-crossing asteroids comparable with 1065 Amundsenia (9.75 km), 1139 Atami (9.35 km), 1474 Beira (8.73 km), 1011 Laodamia (7.5 km), 1727 Mette (est. 9 km), 1131 Porzia (7 km), 1235 Schorria (est. 9 km), 985 Rosina (8.18 km) and 1468 Zomba (7 km), but smaller than the largest members of this dynamical group, namely, 132 Aethra, 323 Brucia, 1508 Kemi, 2204 Lyyli and 512 Taurinensis, which are all larger than 20 kilometers in diameter.

== Naming ==
This minor planet was named in honour of Swiss astronomer Walther Villiger (1872–1938), who himself discovered the main-belt asteroid 428 Monachia at Munich in 1897. The official naming citation was also mentioned in The Names of the Minor Planets by Paul Herget in 1955 (H 120).
