= 2202 Pele =

Eccentric asteroid and near-Earth object

Discovery
- Discovered by: A. R. Klemola
- Discovery site: Lick Obs.
- Discovery date: 7 September 1972

Designations
- Pronunciation: /ˈpeɪleɪ/, Hawaiian: [ˈpɛlɛ]
- Named after: Pele (Hawaiian religion)
- Alternative designations: 1972 RA
- Minor planet category: NEO · Amor

Orbital characteristics
- Epoch 4 September 2017 (JD 2458000.5)
- Uncertainty parameter 0
- Observation arc: 42.59 yr (15,555 days)
- Aphelion: 3.4646 AU
- Perihelion: 1.1146 AU
- Semi-major axis: 2.2896 AU
- Eccentricity: 0.5132
- Orbital period (sidereal): 3.46 yr (1,265 days)
- Mean anomaly: 336.56°
- Mean motion: 0° 17^{m} 4.2^{s} / day
- Inclination: 8.7454°
- Longitude of ascending node: 169.98°
- Argument of perihelion: 217.94°
- Earth MOID: 0.1426 AU · 55.6 LD

Physical characteristics
- Dimensions: 1.5±0.5 km (generic)
- Absolute magnitude (H): 17.2

2202 Pele, provisional designation 1972 RA, is an eccentric asteroid and near-Earth object of the Amor group, approximately 1–2 kilometers in diameter.

It was discovered by American astronomer Arnold Klemola at the U.S. Lick Observatory on Mount Hamilton, California, on 7 September 1972. The asteroid was named after Pele from native Hawaiian religion.

== Orbit and classification ==
Pele orbits the Sun at a distance of 1.1–3.5 AU once every 3 years and 6 months (1,265 days). Its orbit has an eccentricity of 0.51 and an inclination of 9° with respect to the ecliptic.

It is an Amor asteroid, the second largest subgroup of near-Earth objects, that approach the orbit of Earth from beyond, but does not cross it. It has an Earth minimum orbit intersection distance of 0.1426 AU (21,330,000 km), which corresponds to 55.6 lunar distances.

No precoveries were taken. The asteroid's observation arc starts two days after the official discovery observation.

== Physical characteristics ==
As of 2017, Pele's effective size, composition, and albedo, as well as its rotation period and shape remain unknown. It measures between 1 and 2 kilometers, based on a generic magnitude-to-diameter conversion, which assumes an albedo in the range of 0.05 to 0.25.

== Naming ==
This minor planet was named after Pele, the goddess of fire, lightning, and volcanoes from Hawaiian mythology. Pele created the Hawaiian Islands and made Kīlauea her home, after she was forced to go away by her rival sister and goddess of the sea, Nāmaka. The official naming citation was published by the Minor Planet Center on 1 June 1980 (M.P.C. 5360).
