= (8567) 1996 HW1 =

Near-Earth asteroid

(8567) 1996 HW_{1}
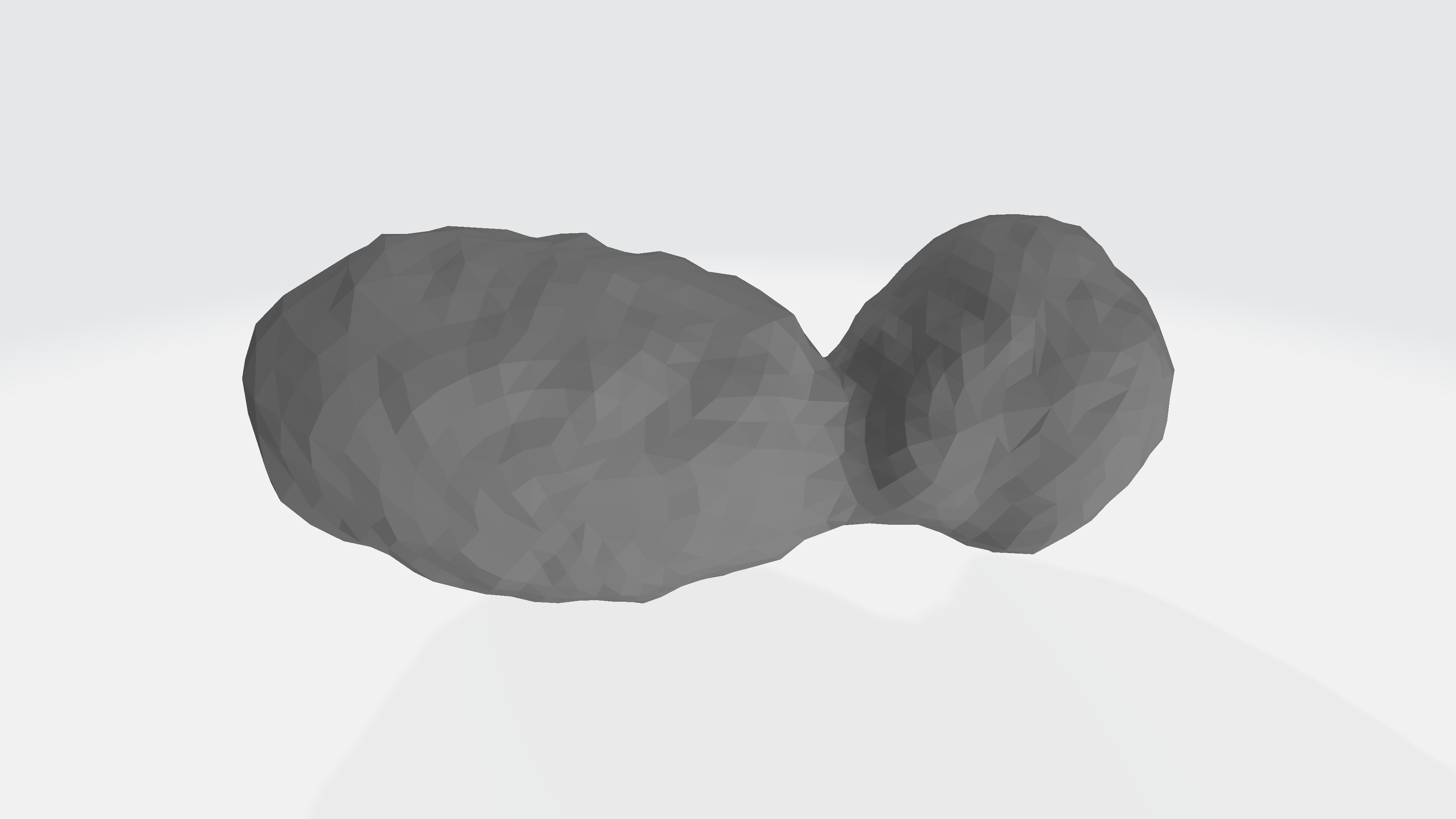
- Shape model of 1996 HW_{1}

Discovery
- Discovered by: Tom Gehrels
- Discovery site: Steward Observatory
- Discovery date: 23 April 1996

Designations
- Minor planet category: NEO · Amor

Orbital characteristics
- Epoch 21 November 2025 (JD 2461000.5)
- Uncertainty parameter 0
- Aphelion: 2.96437 AU
- Perihelion: 1.12697 AU
- Semi-major axis: 2.04567 AU
- Eccentricity: 0.44909
- Orbital period (sidereal): 2.92592 y (1068.69 d)
- Mean anomaly: 314.321°
- Mean motion: 0.33686° / d
- Inclination: 8.44896°
- Longitude of ascending node: 177.0929°
- Argument of perihelion: 177.282°
- Earth MOID: 0.12152 AU
- T_{Jupiter}: 3.652

Physical characteristics
- Dimensions: 3.78±0.19 × 1.64±0.16 × 1.49±0.22 km (Note: Uncertainties are given as 5, 10, and 15% for the x, y, and z axes, respectively.)
- Mean diameter: 2.02 km
- Volume: 4.34±1.09 km^{3} (Note: Uncertainty is given as 25%)
- Sidereal rotation period: 8.76243±0.00004 h
- Pole ecliptic longitude: 281±5°
- Pole ecliptic latitude: −31±5°
- Geometric albedo: 0.156
- Spectral type: Sq-type
- Absolute magnitude (H): 15.36

(8567) 1996 HW_{1} is a near-Earth asteroid (NEA) located in the inner Solar System. It was discovered on 23 April 1996 by astronomer Tom Gehrels at Steward Observatory. It is a contact binary asteroid, with two lobes separated by a distinct "neck"; altogether, the asteroid is on average 2 kilometres (1.2 mi) in diameter. It has a rotation period of 8.76 hours, which is likely gradually slowing because of the YORP effect.

== Discovery ==
1996 HW_{1} was discovered on 23 April 1996 by astronomer Tom Gehrels, who was working as a part of the Spacewatch survey at Steward Observatory, Arizona, United States. The asteroid was assigned the provisional designation 1996 HW_{1} by the Minor Planet Center (MPC), and its discovery was published in a Minor Planet Circular on 2 May 1996. Once its orbit was sufficiently determined, it was given the minor planet number of 8567 by the MPC on 11 April 1998. As of 2025, it remains unnamed.

== Orbit ==
1996 HW_{1} orbits the Sun at an average distance—its semi-major axis—of 2.05 astronomical units (AU), with an orbital period of 2.93 years. It is classified as a near-Earth asteroid; because its orbit lies entirely outside Earth's orbit, it is also classified as an Amor asteroid. Along its orbit, its distance from the Sun varies between 1.13 AU at perihelion to 2.96 AU at aphelion due to its orbital eccentricity of 0.45. Its orbit is inclined by 8.45° with respect to the ecliptic plane.

== Physical characteristics ==
1996 HW_{1} is a contact binary object with dimensions of 3.78 by 1.64 by 1.49 kilometres (2.35 by 1.02 by 0.93 mi) and an equivalent mean diameter of 2.02 kilometres (1.26 mi). Its two lobes have an estimated mass ratio of 2:1, and are separated by a prominent neck.

Spectroscopic observations of 1996 HW_{1} show that it is classified as an Sq-type asteroid, with spectral properties between S-type asteroids and Q-type asteroids. It has a geometric albedo of 0.156, though its visible light albedo is higher at approximately 0.33. Its spectrum is significantly reddened, indicating that its surface has undergone appreciable space weathering.

=== Spin and evolution ===
1996 HW_{1} has a sidereal rotation period of 8.76 hours, spinning in a retrograde direction with pole ecliptic coordinates of (281°, –31°). Its spin properties were derived from its lightcurve, or variations in its observed brightness, which was additionally supported by radar observations. Assuming a bulk density of 2.0 g/cm^{3}, the asteroid is spinning slower than its minimum energy state of 7.4 hours, placing its neck under compressive and shear stress. A lower assumed density of 1.43 g/cm^{3} makes its observed rotation period its minimum energy state, but such a density requires an improbable porosity of 58%.

1996 HW_{1}'s spin is likely being slowed by the YORP effect, where irregularly shaped asteroids experience a torque as they emit thermal radiation. 1996 HW_{1}'s faster rotation period in the past suggests that its two lobes originally may have been separated as a binary system. The YORP effect slowly removes angular momentum from binary asteroids, though how quickly this leads to the two components merging depends on the mass ratio. Given the mass ratio of 1996 HW_{1}'s two lobes, they could have merged in a span of 1 million years (Myr), within the typical 10 Myr dynamical lifetimes of NEAs.
