= 512 Taurinensis =

Mars-crossing asteroid

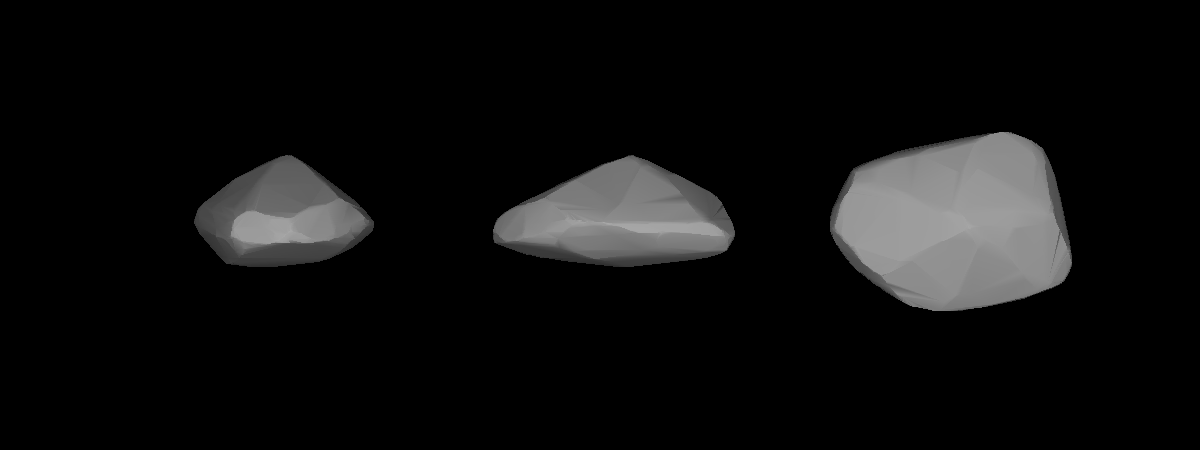
- Lightcurve-based 3D-model of Taurinensis

Discovery
- Discovered by: M. F. Wolf
- Discovery site: Heidelberg Obs.
- Discovery date: 23 June 1903

Designations
- Pronunciation: /tɔːrɪˈnɛnsɪs/
- Named after: Turin (Italian city)
- Alternative designations: 1903 LV · A909 GE
- Minor planet category: Mars-crosser

Orbital characteristics
- Epoch 4 September 2017 (JD 2458000.5)
- Uncertainty parameter 0
- Observation arc: 108.23 yr (39,532 days)
- Aphelion: 2.7466 AU
- Perihelion: 1.6323 AU
- Semi-major axis: 2.1895 AU
- Eccentricity: 0.2545
- Orbital period (sidereal): 3.24 yr (1,183 days)
- Mean anomaly: 30.908°
- Mean motion: 0° 18^{m} 15.12^{s} / day
- Inclination: 8.7463°
- Longitude of ascending node: 107.04°
- Argument of perihelion: 249.36°
- Earth MOID: 0.6518 AU · 253.9 LD
- Mars MOID: 0.2980 AU

Physical characteristics
- Dimensions: 18.70±1.87 km 20.87±0.36 km 23.09±1.4 km
- Synodic rotation period: 5.5804±0.0006 h 5.582 h 5.583±0.001 h 5.585±0.001 h 5.59 h
- Geometric albedo: 0.1772±0.024; 0.225±0.010; 0.270±0.054
- Spectral type: Tholen = S SMASS = S B–V = 0.917; U–B = 0.525
- Absolute magnitude (H): 10.68 · 10.72 · 10.72±0.04 · 10.72±0.40

512 Taurinensis, provisional designation 1903 LV, is a stony asteroid and large Mars-crosser on an eccentric orbit from the inner regions of the asteroid belt, approximately 20 kilometers in diameter. It was discovered on 23 June 1903, by astronomer Max Wolf at the Heidelberg-Königstuhl State Observatory in southwest Germany. The asteroid was named after the Italian city of Turin. It is the 4th-largest Mars-crossing asteroid.

== Orbit and classification ==
Taurinensis is a Mars-crossing asteroid, a dynamically unstable group between the main belt and the near-Earth populations, crossing the orbit of Mars at 1.666 AU. It orbits the Sun at a distance of 1.6–2.7 AU once every 3 years and 3 months (1,183 days). Its orbit has an eccentricity of 0.25 and an inclination of 9° with respect to the ecliptic. The body's observation arc begins with its identification as A909 GE at Heidelberg in April 1909, almost 6 years prior to its official discovery observation.

== Physical characteristics ==
Taurinensis is a common, stony S-type asteroid in both the Tholen and SMASS classification.

=== Rotation period ===
In 1982, the asteroid was observed using photometry from the La Silla Observatory to generate a composite light curve. The resulting data showed a rotation period of 0.2326 days (5.58 h) with a brightness variation of 0.2 in magnitude.

=== Diameter and albedo ===
According to the surveys carried out by the Infrared Astronomical Satellite IRAS, the Japanese Akari satellite and the NEOWISE mission of NASA's Wide-field Infrared Survey Explorer, Taurinensis measures between 18.70 and 23.09 kilometers in diameter and its surface has an albedo between 0.1772 and 0.270. The Collaborative Asteroid Lightcurve Link adopts the results obtained by IRAS, that is, an albedo of 0.1772 and a diameter of 23.09 kilometers based on an absolute magnitude of 10.72.

With a mean-diameter of 20 kilometers, Taurinensis is the 4th-largest Mars-crossing asteroids, just behind 132 Aethra (43 km), 323 Brucia (36 km) and 2204 Lyyli (25 km), and larger than 1508 Kemi (17 km), 1474 Beira (15 km) and 1310 Villigera (14 km).

== Naming ==
This minor planet was named after "Taurinensis", the Latin name of the city of Turin, located in northern Italy. It was named in 1905, by astronomers of the Observatory of Turin with the discoverer's endorsement (AN 167, 239). The official naming citation was mentioned in The Names of the Minor Planets by Paul Herget in 1955 (H 55).
