= 985 Rosina =

Mars-crossing asteroid

Discovery
- Discovered by: K. Reinmuth
- Discovery site: Heidelberg Obs.
- Discovery date: 14 October 1922

Designations
- Named after: A girl's name picked from a popular German calendar
- Alternative designations: 1922 MO
- Minor planet category: Mars crosser

Orbital characteristics
- Epoch 4 September 2017 (JD 2458000.5)
- Uncertainty parameter 0
- Observation arc: 94.37 yr (34,467 days)
- Aphelion: 2.9380 AU
- Perihelion: 1.6604 AU
- Semi-major axis: 2.2992 AU
- Eccentricity: 0.2778
- Orbital period (sidereal): 3.49 yr (1,273 days)
- Mean anomaly: 92.838°
- Mean motion: 0° 16^{m} 57.72^{s} / day
- Inclination: 4.0564°
- Longitude of ascending node: 290.33°
- Argument of perihelion: 59.636°
- Earth MOID: 0.6583 AU · 256.5 LD

Physical characteristics
- Dimensions: 8.18 km (calculated)
- Synodic rotation period: 3.012±0.001 h 3.0126±0.0002 h
- Geometric albedo: 0.20 (assumed)
- Spectral type: SMASS = S · S
- Absolute magnitude (H): 12.70 · 12.8 · 13.05±0.30

985 Rosina, provisional designation 1922 MO, is a stony asteroid and sizable Mars-crosser on an eccentric orbit from the inner regions of the asteroid belt, approximately 8 kilometers in diameter. It was discovered on 14 October 1922, by astronomer Karl Reinmuth at the Heidelberg-Königstuhl State Observatory in Germany. The asteroid's name is a common German female name, unrelated to the discoverer's contemporaries.

== Orbit and classification ==
Rosina is a Mars-crossing asteroid, a dynamically unstable group between the main belt and the near-Earth populations, crossing the orbit of Mars at 1.666 AU.

It orbits the Sun in the inner main-belt at a distance of 1.7–2.9 AU once every 3 years and 6 months (1,273 days). Its orbit has an eccentricity of 0.28 and an inclination of 4° with respect to the ecliptic. The body's observation arc begins at Vienna Observatory, eight days after its official discovery observation at Heidelberg.

== Physical characteristics ==
In the SMASS classification, Rosina is a stony S-type asteroid. It has also been characterized as such by Pan-STARRS and SDSS.

=== Rotation period ===
Two rotational lightcurves of Rosina were obtained from photometric observations. Lightcurve analysis gave a well-defined rotation period of 3.012 and 3.0126 hours with an identical brightness amplitude of 0.22 magnitude (U=3/3).

=== Diameter and albedo ===
The Collaborative Asteroid Lightcurve Link assumes a standard albedo for stony asteroids of 0.20 and calculates a diameter of 8.18 kilometers based on an absolute magnitude of 12.8.

== Naming ==
This minor planet was named after a girl's name picked from the German popular calendar Der Lahrer hinkende Bote.^{(de)}

=== Reinmuth's Calendar Girls ===
As with 913 Otila, 997 Priska and 1144 Oda, Reinmuth selected names from this calendar due to his many asteroid discoveries that he had trouble thinking of proper names. These names are not related to the discoverer's contemporaries. The author of the Dictionary of Minor Planet Names learned about Reinmuth's source of inspiration from private communications with Dutch astronomer Ingrid van Houten-Groeneveld, who worked as a young astronomer at Heidelberg.
