= 1235 Schorria =

Hungaria asteroid

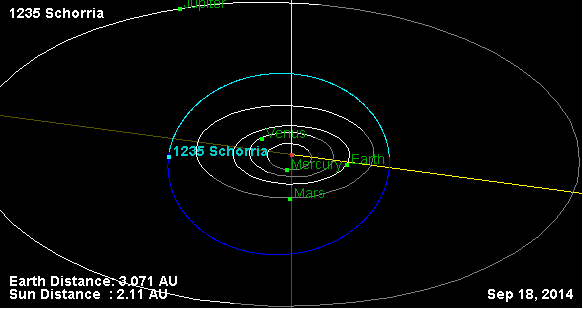
- Orbit of 1235 Schorria relative to the inner planets and Jupiter

Discovery
- Discovered by: K. Reinmuth
- Discovery site: Heidelberg Obs.
- Discovery date: 18 October 1931

Designations
- Pronunciation: /ˈʃɒriə/
- Named after: Richard Schorr (1867–1951) (German astronomer)
- Alternative designations: 1931 UJ · 1988 HD
- Minor planet category: Mars-crosser · Hungaria

Orbital characteristics
- Epoch 31 May 2020 (JD 2459000.5)
- Uncertainty parameter 0
- Observation arc: 88.52 yr (32,333 d)
- Aphelion: 2.2056 AU
- Perihelion: 1.6147 AU
- Semi-major axis: 1.9102 AU
- Eccentricity: 0.1547
- Orbital period (sidereal): 2.64 yr (964 d)
- Mean anomaly: 183.19°
- Mean motion: 0° 22^{m} 23.88^{s} / day
- Inclination: 24.998°
- Longitude of ascending node: 12.947°
- Argument of perihelion: 43.732°
- Earth MOID: 0.6612 AU (257.6 LD)

Physical characteristics
- Mean diameter: 5.55±1.11 km 9 km (estimate); 11±4 (generic)
- Synodic rotation period: 1265±25 h (Note: Lightcurve plot of (1235) Schorria, Palmer Divide Observatory, B. D. Warner (2009))
- Geometric albedo: 0.40 (assumed); 0.486±0.194
- Spectral type: Tholen = CX: B–V = 0.750; U–B = 0.330
- Absolute magnitude (H): 12.68; 13.10

1235 Schorria (prov. designation: 1931 UJ), is a Hungaria asteroid, sizable Mars-crosser, and exceptionally slow rotator from the inner region of the asteroid belt. The carbonaceous C-type asteroid has an outstandingly long rotation period of 1265 hours (7.5 weeks) and measures approximately 5.5 kilometers (3.4 miles) kilometers in diameter. It was discovered by Karl Reinmuth at Heidelberg Observatory in southwest Germany on 18 October 1931, and named after German astronomer Richard Schorr (1867–1951).

== Orbit and classification ==
Schorria is a Mars-crossing member of the Hungaria asteroids, which form the innermost dense concentration of asteroids in the Solar System. It orbits the Sun in the inner main-belt at a distance of 1.6–2.2 AU once every 2 years and 8 months (964 days; semi-major axis of 1.91 AU). Its orbit has an eccentricity of 0.15 and an inclination of 25° with respect to the ecliptic. The body's observation arc begins at Heidelberg two weeks after its official discovery observation, as no precoveries were taken, and no prior identifications were made.

== Naming ==
This minor planet was named after Richard Schorr (1867–1951), a German astronomer at Bergedorf Observatory, Hamburg, who discovered the minor planets 869 Mellena and 1240 Centenaria. After being named by ARI with the consent of the discoverer (RI 862), naming citation was later published by Paul Herget in The Names of the Minor Planets in 1955 (H 114). The lunar crater Schorr is also named in the astronomer's honour. In 1913, asteroid 725 Amanda was already named after Schorr's wife by discovering astronomer Johann Palisa.

== Physical characteristics ==
In the Tholen taxonomy, Schorria' spectral type is closest to that of a carbonaceous C-type and somewhat similar to that of an X-type asteroid though with a noisy spectrum (CX:).

=== Slow rotator ===
In March 2009, a rotational lightcurve of Schorria was obtained from photometric observations by American astronomers Brian Warner and Robert Stephens. Light curve analysis of the two astronomer's combined data set of almost 2000 photometric observations revealed that this Mars-crosser is one of the slowest rotating asteroids known to exist. It has a rotation period of 1265±80 hours, or about 52 days, with a high brightness variation of 1.40 in magnitude (U=3), which is indicative of a non-spheroidal shape. The body was also suspected to be in a tumbling state. However, no significant evidence of such a non-principal axis rotation could be found.

=== Diameter and albedo ===
According to the space-based survey by NASA's Wide-field Infrared Survey Explorer with its subsequent NEOWISE mission, Schorria measures (5.55±1.11) kilometers in diameter and its surface has an albedo of (0.486±0.194). Based on a generic magnitude-to-diameter conversion, the body measures between 7 and 15 kilometers, for an absolute magnitude at 13 and an albedo in the range of 0.05 to 0.25, while Warner/Stephens estimated a diameter of approximately 9 kilometers in 2009.

The Collaborative Asteroid Lightcurve Link calculates a diameter of 5.04 kilometers based on an albedo of 0.40, which is contrary to an expected low albedo for dark, carbonaceous CX-type asteroids as classified by Tholen, but typical for the descendants of the E-belt, a hypothesized population of primordial asteroids, which the E-type Hungarian asteroids with high inclinations and a semi-major axis of 1.9 AU are thought to have originated from.
