= 2204 Lyyli =

Dark asteroid

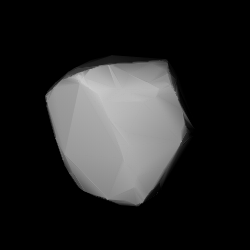
- Shape model of Lyyli from its lightcurve

Discovery
- Discovered by: Y. Väisälä
- Discovery site: Turku Obs.
- Discovery date: 3 March 1943

Designations
- Named after: Lyyli Heinänen (Esperantist)
- Alternative designations: 1943 EQ · 1968 DN
- Minor planet category: Mars-crosser

Orbital characteristics
- Epoch 4 September 2017 (JD 2458000.5)
- Uncertainty parameter 0
- Observation arc: 73.75 yr (26,937 days)
- Aphelion: 3.6435 AU
- Perihelion: 1.5354 AU
- Semi-major axis: 2.5894 AU
- Eccentricity: 0.4071
- Orbital period (sidereal): 4.17 yr (1,522 days)
- Mean anomaly: 350.25°
- Inclination: 20.561°
- Longitude of ascending node: 160.45°
- Argument of perihelion: 283.25°
- Earth MOID: 0.6872 AU
- Mars MOID: 0.2547 AU

Physical characteristics
- Mean diameter: 25.16±2.4 km (IRAS:11); 25.27 km (derived); 27.12±1.31 km
- Synodic rotation period: 9.51±0.01 h 10 h 11.063±0.001 h 11.09±0.01 h
- Geometric albedo: 0.020±0.002; 0.0232±0.005 (IRAS:11); 0.050±0.006; 0.0537 (derived)
- Spectral type: SMASS = X · P · X
- Absolute magnitude (H): 11.61±0.44 · 11.78 · 12.1 · 12.70

2204 Lyyli (prov. designation: 1943 EQ) is a dark asteroid and very eccentric Mars-crosser from the middle region of the asteroid belt, approximately 25 kilometers (16 miles) in diameter. It was discovered on 3 March 1943 by Finnish astronomer Yrjö Väisälä at Turku Observatory in Southwest Finland.

== Orbit and classification ==
Lyyli orbits the Sun in the central main-belt at a distance of 1.5–3.6 AU once every 4 years and 2 months (1,522 days). Its orbit has an eccentricity of 0.41 and an inclination of 21° with respect to the ecliptic.

== Naming ==
This minor planet was named in honour of Lyyli Heinänen (1903–1988), née Hartonen, a Finnish female Esperantist, professor of mathematics, amateur astronomer and former assistant of the discoverer. The official naming citation was published by the Minor Planet Center on 26 May 1983 (M.P.C. 7944).

== Physical characteristics ==
Lyyli is an X-type asteroid in the SMASS classification. It has also been characterized as a P-type asteroid by NASA's NEOWISE mission.

It has a rotation period of 11 hours and a very low albedo between 0.02 and 0.05, according to the surveys carried out by IRAS, Akari, and WISE/NEOWISE. Other large Mars crossing minor planets include 132 Aethra and 323 Brucia, with diameters of 43 and 36 kilometers, respectively.
