= 1508 Kemi =

Asteroid

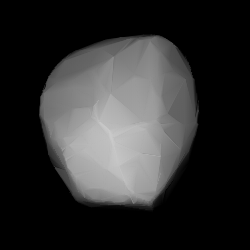
- Shape model of Kemi from its lightcurve

Discovery
- Discovered by: H. Alikoski
- Discovery site: Turku Obs.
- Discovery date: 21 October 1938

Designations
- Named after: Kemi and Kemi River (Finnish town and river)
- Alternative designations: 1938 UP · 1935 FA; 1938 UO
- Minor planet category: Mars-crosser

Orbital characteristics
- Epoch 4 September 2017 (JD 2458000.5)
- Uncertainty parameter 0
- Observation arc: 81.79 yr (29,873 days)
- Aphelion: 3.9264 AU
- Perihelion: 1.6167 AU
- Semi-major axis: 2.7716 AU
- Eccentricity: 0.4167
- Orbital period (sidereal): 4.61 yr (1,685 days)
- Mean anomaly: 354.04°
- Mean motion: 0° 12^{m} 48.96^{s} / day
- Inclination: 28.723°
- Longitude of ascending node: 14.298°
- Argument of perihelion: 92.892°
- Mars MOID: 0.3966 AU

Physical characteristics
- Dimensions: 15.78±1.58 km 15.9±1.6 km 16±2 km 17.98±1.34 km 21.86 km (calculated)
- Synodic rotation period: 9.15 h 9.19±0.05 h 9.19182±0.00005 h 9.196±0.001 h (Note: Lightcurve plot of (1508) Kemi, Robert Koff, Antelope Hills Observatory (H09). Summary figures at LCDB); 11.36 h
- Geometric albedo: 0.057 (assumed); 0.084±0.013; 0.109±0.022; 0.11±0.02
- Spectral type: Tholen = BCF; SMASS = C B–V = 0.645; U–B = 0.249
- Absolute magnitude (H): 12.03

1508 Kemi (provisional designation 1938 UP) is an eccentric, carbonaceous asteroid and one of the largest Mars-crossers, approximately 17 kilometers in diameter. Discovered by Heikki Alikoski at Turku Observatory in 1938, the asteroid was later named after the Finnish town of Kemi and the Kemi River.

== Discovery ==
Kemi was discovered on 21 October 1938, by Finnish astronomer Heikki Alikoski at the Iso-Heikkilä Observatory in Turku, Finland. It was independently discovered by Hungarian astronomer György Kulin at Konkoly Observatory near Budapest on 30 October 1938. The Minor Planet Center, however, only acknowledges the first discoverer. The asteroid was first identified as 1935 FA at Uccle Observatory in March 1935.

== Orbit and classification ==
Kemi is a Mars-crossing asteroid as it crosses the orbit of Mars at 1.666 AU. Because of its high inclination, it has been grouped with the Pallas family (801), an asteroid family of bright carbonaceous asteroids, as well as with the "Phaethon group", despite its untypical spectrum.

It orbits the Sun at a distance of 1.6–3.9 AU once every 4 years and 7 months (1,685 days). Its orbit has an eccentricity of 0.42 and an inclination of 29° with respect to the ecliptic. The body's observation arc begins at Uccle in May 1935, more than 3 years prior to its official discovery observation at Turku.

== Physical characteristics ==
In the SMASS classification, Kemi is a common carbonaceous C-type asteroid. In the Tholen classification, the body's spectral type is ambiguous (BCF), closest to that of a bright carbonaceous B-type and somewhat similar to a C- and F-type asteroid.

=== Rotation period ===
Several rotational lightcurves of Kemi have been obtained from photometric observations since the 1990s. Analysis of the lightcurves gave a consolidated rotation period of 9.196 hours with a brightness variation between of 0.25 and 0.55 magnitude (U=2/3/3/2).

=== Poles ===
In 2016, an international study modeled a lightcurve with a concurring period of 9.19182 hours. It also determined two spin axis at (352.0°, 72.0°) and (166.0°, 73.0°) in ecliptic coordinates (λ, β).

=== Diameter and albedo ===
According to the surveys carried out by the Japanese Akari satellite and the NEOWISE mission of NASA's Wide-field Infrared Survey Explorer, Kemi measures between 15.78 and 17.98 kilometers in diameter and its surface has an albedo between 0.084 and 0.11. The Collaborative Asteroid Lightcurve Link assumes a standard albedo for carbonaceous asteroids of 0.057 and calculates a diameter of 21.86 kilometers based on an absolute magnitude of 12.03.

== Naming ==
This minor planet was named after the Finnish town of Kemi and the Kemi River (Kemijoki), the largest river in Finland, on which the town lies. The naming agrees with the established pattern of giving high-inclination asteroids four-letter names. The official naming citation was published by the Minor Planet Center on 20 February 1976 (M.P.C. 3928).
