= 323 Brucia =

Phocaea asteroid

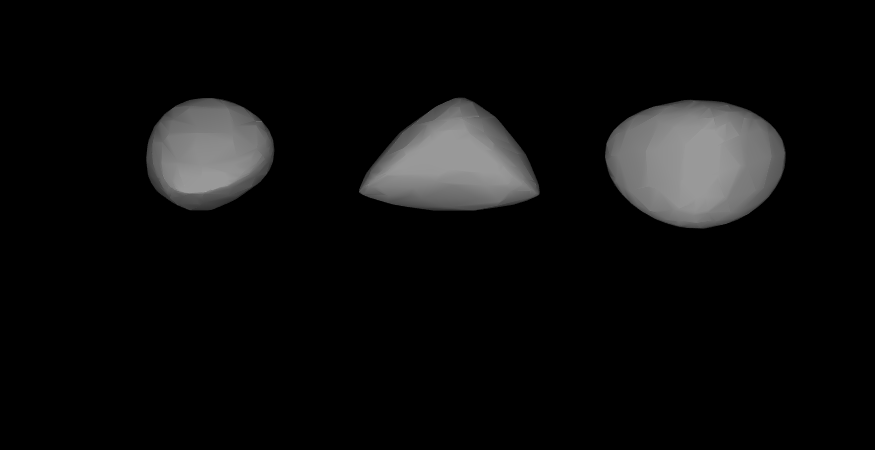
- Lightcurve-base 3D-model of 323 Brucia.

Discovery
- Discovered by: M. F. Wolf
- Discovery site: Heidelberg Obs.
- Discovery date: 22 December 1891

Designations
- Pronunciation: /ˈbruːsiə, ˈbruːʃə/
- Named after: Catherine Wolfe Bruce (American philanthropist)
- Alternative designations: 1934 JC · A923 JA
- Minor planet category: main-belt · (inner); Phocaea · ex-Mars-crosser

Orbital characteristics
- Epoch 4 September 2017 (JD 2458000.5)
- Uncertainty parameter 0
- Observation arc: 125.35 yr (45,785 days)
- Aphelion: 3.0979 AU
- Perihelion: 1.6662 AU
- Semi-major axis: 2.3820 AU
- Eccentricity: 0.3005
- Orbital period (sidereal): 3.68 yr (1,343 days)
- Mean anomaly: 106.64°
- Mean motion: 0° 16^{m} 5.16^{s} / day
- Inclination: 24.230°
- Longitude of ascending node: 97.398°
- Argument of perihelion: 291.26°
- Mars MOID: 0.3464 AU

Physical characteristics
- Dimensions: 27.714±0.300 km 29.23±2.92 km 32.395±0.317 km 35.82±1.7 km 37.29±0.76 km
- Synodic rotation period: 9.46 h 9.4602±0.0001 h 9.463±0.005 h 10 h
- Geometric albedo: 0.165±0.007; 0.1765±0.018; 0.2174±0.0421; 0.265±0.053; 0.295±0.046
- Spectral type: Tholen = S B–V = 0.893; U–B = 0.480
- Absolute magnitude (H): 9.09±0.58 · 9.73

323 Brucia is a stony Phocaea asteroid and former Mars-crosser from the inner regions of the asteroid belt, approximately its diameter is 33 kilometers (21 miles). It was the first asteroid to be discovered by the use of astrophotography.

== Description ==
Brucia was also the first of over 200 asteroids discovered by Max Wolf, a pioneer in that method of finding astronomical objects. Discovered on 22 December 1891, when he was 28 years old, it was named in honour of Catherine Wolfe Bruce, a noted patroness of the science of astronomy, who had donated $10,000 for the construction of the telescope used by Wolf.

The asteroid is a member of the Phocaea family (701), a large family of stony S-type asteroids with nearly two thousand known members.

Brucia has a synodic rotation period of 9.463 hours as of 1998. According to the survey carried out by the Infrared Astronomical Satellite, Brucia measures 35.82 kilometers in diameter and its surface has an albedo of 0.1765.
