= 3671 Dionysus =

Binary Amor asteroid orbiting between Earth and the asteroid belt

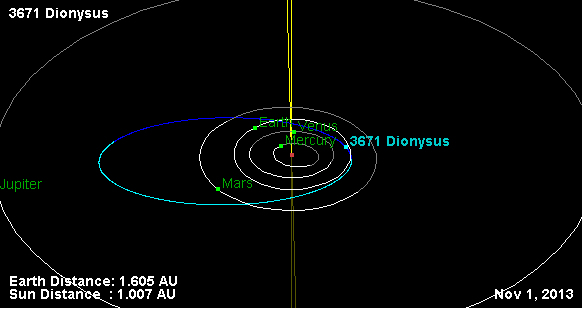
- Orbit of 3671 Dionysus

Discovery
- Discovered by: C. S. Shoemaker; E. M. Shoemaker
- Discovery site: Palomar Observatory
- Discovery date: 27 May 1984

Designations
- Pronunciation: /daɪəˈnaɪsəs/
- Named after: Διόνυσος Dionȳsos
- Alternative designations: 1984 KD
- Minor planet category: PHA
- Adjectives: Dionysian /daɪəˈnɪsiən/

Orbital characteristics
- Epoch 13 January 2016 (JD 2457400.5)
- Uncertainty parameter 0
- Observation arc: 11629 days (31.84 yr)
- Aphelion: 3.389527126 AU (507.0660407 Gm)
- Perihelion: 1.00825538 AU (150.832858 Gm)
- Semi-major axis: 2.198891253 AU (328.9494493 Gm)
- Eccentricity: 0.54147101
- Orbital period (sidereal): 3.26 yr (1191.0 d)
- Mean anomaly: 244.408078°
- Mean motion: 0° 18^{m} 8.181^{s} / day
- Inclination: 13.5346771°
- Longitude of ascending node: 82.1319934°
- Argument of perihelion: 204.217348°
- Known satellites: 1
- Earth MOID: 0.0199599 AU (2.98596 Gm)

Physical characteristics
- Dimensions: 1.5 km
- Mean density: 1.6 g/cm^{3}
- Synodic rotation period: 2.7053 h (0.11272 d)
- Geometric albedo: 0.16
- Spectral type: B
- Absolute magnitude (H): 16.5

3671 Dionysus is a small binary Amor asteroid, orbiting between Earth and the asteroid belt. It was discovered by Carolyn and Gene Shoemaker at Palomar Observatory on 27 May 1984. It is named after Dionysus, the Greek god of wine. Its provisional designation was 1984 KD. It is an outer Earth grazer because its perihelion is just within Earth's orbit.

== Potentially hazardous object ==
3671 Dionysus is a potentially hazardous asteroid (PHA) because its minimum orbit intersection distance (MOID) is less than 0.05 AU and its diameter is greater than 150 meters. The Earth-MOID is 0.01989 AU (2,976,000 km; 1,849,000 mi). Its orbit is well-determined for the next several hundred years.

Dionysus makes modestly close approaches to Earth. On 19 June 1984 Dionysus passed 0.0305 AU (4,560,000 km; 2,840,000 mi) from Earth. On 18 June 2085 it will pass 0.028 AU (4,200,000 km; 2,600,000 mi) from Earth.

== Moon ==
In 1997, a team of astronomers at the European Southern Observatory announced that lightcurve observations indicate the presence of a small moon orbiting Dionysus. Its provisional designation is S/1997 (3671) 1. This moon measures 300 meters in diameter, and orbits 3.6 km from Dionysus with an eccentricity of 0.07 and an orbital period of 27.72 hours. From the surface of Dionysus, S/1997 (3671) 1 would have an apparent diameter of roughly 3.02 degrees. (Note: Calculated by solving the equation $\scriptstyle{\mathrm{tan}\left(\frac{\theta}{2}\right) = \frac{\mathrm{radius~of~moon}}{\mathrm{distance~from~surface~of~asteroid~to~center~of~moon}}}$.) For comparison, the Sun appears to be 0.5° from Earth.
