= 4029 Bridges =

Stony asteroid and binary system from the middle regions of the asteroid belt

Discovery
- Discovered by: C. Shoemaker; S. J. Bus
- Discovery site: Palomar Obs.
- Discovery date: 24 May 1982

Designations
- Named after: Patricia M. Bridges (planetary cartographer)
- Alternative designations: 1982 KC_{1} · 1974 HS_{2} 1975 TQ · 1978 AF; 1978 JJ_{2} · 1982 OX; 1986 JF
- Minor planet category: main-belt · (middle)

Orbital characteristics
- Epoch 4 September 2017 (JD 2458000.5)
- Uncertainty parameter 0
- Observation arc: 42.93 yr (15,680 days)
- Aphelion: 2.8575 AU
- Perihelion: 2.1925 AU
- Semi-major axis: 2.5250 AU
- Eccentricity: 0.1317
- Orbital period (sidereal): 4.01 yr (1,466 days)
- Mean anomaly: 287.79°
- Mean motion: 0° 14^{m} 44.16^{s} / day
- Inclination: 5.4383°
- Longitude of ascending node: 214.78°
- Argument of perihelion: 16.729°
- Known satellites: 1 (Note: Central Bureau for Astronomical Telegrams – CBET No. 507 for (4029) Bridges, 8 May 2006: Photometric observation taken between 11 April and 4 May 2006, revealed that (4029) Bridges is a binary system. Its satellite has an orbital period of 16.31±0.01 hours. The primary has a rotation period of 3.5746±0.0001 hours and a brightness amplitude of 0.20 magnitude. The observed mutual occultation/eclipsing events are 0.06 to 0.12 magnitude deep. The system has a secondary-to-primary mean-diameter ratio of 0.24±0.02 Reported by: D. Higgins, Canberra, Australia; P. Pravec and P. Kusnirak, Ondrejov Observatory; W. Cooney, J. Gross, and D. Terrell, Sonoita Research Observatory, Sonoita, AZ; and R. Stephens, Yucca Valley, CA.) (D: 1.87 km; P: 16.317 h)

Physical characteristics
- Dimensions: 7.433±0.122 km 7.91 km 8.015±0.073 km
- Synodic rotation period: 3.57459±0.0001 h 3.5746±0.0001 h 3.5748±0.0002 h 3.57491±0.0003 h (Note: (4029) Bridges – unpublished photometry at Ondřejov Observatory. Credits: Ondrejov; date: 16 Oct 2011 – 1 Nov 2011; period: 3.57491±0.00009; amplitude 0.23: lightcurve plot p1 (A); lightcurve plot porb (A); lightcurve plot p1 (B); lightcurve plot porb (B)); 3.6941±0.0002 h
- Geometric albedo: 0.1848; 0.2007±0.0148; 0.265±0.036
- Spectral type: S
- Absolute magnitude (H): 12.40±0.10 (R) · 12.49±0.02 (R) · 12.8 · 12.85 · 12.96±0.094 · 13.03±0.50

4029 Bridges, provisional designation 1982 KC_{1}, is a stony asteroid and binary system from the middle regions of the asteroid belt, approximately 8 kilometers in diameter.

It was discovered on 24 May 1982, by American astronomers Carolyn Shoemaker and Schelte Bus at Palomar Observatory, California, and named after American USGS planetary cartographer Patricia M. Bridges.

== Orbit and classification ==
Bridges is a stony S-type asteroid that orbits the Sun in the middle main-belt at a distance of 2.2–2.9 AU once every 4.01 years (1,466 days). Its orbit has an eccentricity of 0.13 and an inclination of 5° with respect to the ecliptic. With a semi-major axis of 2.525 AU, Bridges is near the main-belt's Kirkwood gap at 2.5 AU, which corresponds to the 3:1 orbital resonance with the gas giant Jupiter. It is, however, not a member of the Alinda family due to its much lower eccentricity.

It was first identified as 1974 HS_{2} at the Chilean Cerro El Roble Observatory in 1974, extending the body's observation arc by 8 years prior to its official discovery observation at Palomar.

== Physical characteristics ==
=== Primary ===
==== Rotation period ====
In May 2002, a first rotational lightcurve of Bridges was obtained from photometric observations by French amateur astronomers René Roy and Laurent Bernasconi. Lightcurve analysis gave a well-defined rotation period of 3.6941 hours with a brightness variation of 0.24 magnitude (U=3).

A large number of observations have followed since 2006, when a satellite in orbit of Bridges was discovered (see below). Between 2007 and 2012, several observation by astronomers Petr Pravec and gave a period between 3.57459 and 3.5754 hours with an amplitude between 0.18 and 0.29 magnitude (U=3/3/3/3/3). (Note: (4029) Bridges – unpublished photometry at Ondřejov Observatory. Credits: CarbuncleH, Ond, SPles; date: 5 Oct 2007 – 12 Nov 2007; period: 3.5752±0.0001; amplitude 0.21: lightcurve plot porb; lightcurve plot porb contacts; lightcurve plot p1; Remarks: P_orb = 16.31 +/- 0.02 h, a lower limit on D_2/D_1 = 0.32 +/- 0.02. H_R estimated assuming G = 0.24 +/- 0.11) (Note: (4029) Bridges – unpublished photometry at Ondřejov Observatory. Credits: HuntersH, Prompt; date: 8–19 May 2010; period: 3.5754±0.0002; amplitude 0.23: lightcurve plot p1; lightcurve plot porb) (Note: (4029) Bridges – unpublished photometry at Ondřejov Observatory. Credits: HuntersH, Prompt, Khar; date: 4–9 June 2010; period: 3.5752±0.0002; amplitude 0.29: lightcurve plot p1; lightcurve plot porb)

==== Diameter and albedo ====
According to the survey carried out by NASA's Wide-field Infrared Survey Explorer (WISE) with its subsequent NEOWISE mission, Bridges measures 7.433 and 8.015 kilometers in diameter and its surface has an albedo of 0.265 and 0.2007, respectively. The Collaborative Asteroid Lightcurve Link adopts Petr Pravec's revised WISE-data, that is, an albedo of 0.1848 and a diameter of 7.91 kilometers with an absolute magnitude of 12.96.

=== Satellite ===
In April and May 2006, Bridges was observed by astronomers David Higgins at Hunters Hill Observatory (E14), Australia, Petr Pravec and Peter Kušnirák at Ondřejov Observatory Czech Republic, Walter R. Cooney Jr., John Gross and Dirk Terrell at Sonoita Research Observatory (G94), United States, and Robert Stephens at Santana Observatory (646), United States.

The observed mutual occultation/eclipsing events revealed, that Bridges is a binary asteroid, that is orbited every 16.31±0.01 hours by a minor-planet moon. A refined orbital period of 16.317 hours was later published. Based on the system's secondary-to-primary mean-diameter ratio of 0.24±0.02, the satellite measures approximately 1.87±0.16 kilometers in diameter. Johnston's Archive also estimates a semi-major axis of 13 kilometers for the moon's orbit.

== Naming ==
This minor planet was named after Patricia M. Bridges, planetary cartographer with the United States Geological Survey. Bridges has created detailed maps of several planetary body's surface features, and has been an airbrushing expert for shaded lunar relief maps based on spacecraft images. The approved naming citation was published by the Minor Planet Center on 12 December 1989 (M.P.C. 15576).
