= 4947 Ninkasi =

Near-Earth asteroid

Discovery
- Discovered by: C. S. Shoemaker
- Discovery site: Palomar Obs.
- Discovery date: 12 October 1988

Designations
- Pronunciation: /nɪŋˈkɑːsi/
- Named after: Ninkasi
- Alternative designations: 1988 TJ_{1}
- Minor planet category: NEO Amor

Orbital characteristics
- Epoch 13 January 2016 (JD 2457400.5)
- Uncertainty parameter 0
- Observation arc: 13659 days (37.40 yr)
- Aphelion: 1.600761485818500 AU (239.47050977701 Gm)
- Perihelion: 1.13928481550582 AU (170.43458252051 Gm)
- Semi-major axis: 1.370023150662 AU (204.9525461487 Gm)
- Eccentricity: 0.1684192964511710
- Orbital period (sidereal): 1.60 yr (585.72 d)
- Mean anomaly: 337.8470256565600°
- Mean motion: 0° 36^{m} 52.66^{s} / day
- Inclination: 15.65150318051197°
- Longitude of ascending node: 215.4605646418820°
- Argument of perihelion: 192.858019947831°
- Earth MOID: 0.148912 AU (22.2769 Gm)

Physical characteristics
- Dimensions: 520 meters (est. at 0.20)
- Spectral type: Sq
- Absolute magnitude (H): 18.0

4947 Ninkasi, provisional designation 1988 TJ_{1}, is a sub-kilometer asteroid, classified as near-Earth object of the Amor group, approximately 520 meters in diameter. It was discovered on 12 October 1988, by American astronomer Carolyn Shoemaker at Palomar Observatory in California.

It was named after Ninkasi, the Sumerian goddess of wine and beer, who helped the god Lugalbanda rescue the tablets of fate from the demon Zu.

With an absolute magnitude of 18.0, the asteroid is about 670–1500 meters in diameter. On 2031-Apr-20 the asteroid will pass 0.02917 AU (4,364,000 km; 2,712,000 mi) from Mars.
