= 4899 Candace =

Background asteroid from the inner regions of the asteroid belt

Discovery
- Discovered by: C. Shoemaker; E. M. Shoemaker
- Discovery site: Palomar Obs.
- Discovery date: 9 May 1988

Designations
- Named after: Candace P. Kohl (American chemist)
- Alternative designations: 1988 JU · 1952 QL_{1} 1977 EZ_{1} · 1977 FK_{1}
- Minor planet category: main-belt · (inner); Phocaea · background

Orbital characteristics
- Epoch 4 September 2017 (JD 2458000.5)
- Uncertainty parameter 0
- Observation arc: 40.31 yr (14,724 days)
- Aphelion: 2.8121 AU
- Perihelion: 1.9324 AU
- Semi-major axis: 2.3722 AU
- Eccentricity: 0.1854
- Orbital period (sidereal): 3.65 yr (1,335 days)
- Mean anomaly: 331.34°
- Mean motion: 0° 16^{m} 11.28^{s} / day
- Inclination: 22.564°
- Longitude of ascending node: 190.20°
- Argument of perihelion: 74.203°

Physical characteristics
- Dimensions: 6.205±0.030 km 6.526±0.107 km 7.63 km (calculated); 7.80±1.80 km 8.56±0.66 km
- Synodic rotation period: 40.7 h (Note: Pravec (2011) web: rotation period 40.7 hours with a brightness amplitude of 0.15 mag. (CarbH, Modra, Ondr. Observatories; Kusnirak, Pravec) Quality Code of 2. Ondrejov Asteroid Photometry Project. Summary figures at Collaborative Asteroid Lightcurve Link (CALL) for (4899) Candace and Pravec, P.; Wolf, M.; Sarounova, L. (2007), (data))
- Geometric albedo: 0.087±0.014; 0.23±0.09; 0.293±0.045; 0.4213±0.0617
- Spectral type: S (assumed)
- Absolute magnitude (H): 12.6 · 12.8 · 12.90 · 13.36±0.51 · 13.60

4899 Candace, provisional designation 1988 JU, is a background asteroid from the inner regions of the asteroid belt, approximately 7 kilometers in diameter. It was discovered on 9 May 1988, by astronomer couple Carolyn and Eugene Shoemaker at the Palomar Observatory in California, United States. The asteroid was named after American chemist Candace Kohl.

== Orbit and classification ==
Candace is a non-family asteroid from the main belt's background population based on the hierarchical clustering method. It has also been considered a member of the Phocaea family (701). It orbits the Sun in the inner main-belt at a distance of 1.9–2.8 AU once every 3 years and 8 months (1,335 days; semi-major axis of 2.37 AU). Its orbit has an eccentricity of 0.19 and an inclination of 23° with respect to the ecliptic.

The body's observation arc begins with its first observation as 1952 QL_{1} at Palomar in August 1952, or 36 years prior to its official discovery observation.

== Physical characteristics ==
Candace is an assumed stony S-type asteroid.

=== Rotation period ===
In April 2010, a rotational lightcurve of Candace was obtained from photometric observations by Petr Pravec at Ondřejov Observatory. Lightcurve analysis gave a rotation period of 40.7 hours with a brightness amplitude of 0.15 magnitude (U=2).

=== Diameter and albedo ===
According to the surveys carried out by the Japanese Akari satellite and the NEOWISE mission of NASA's Wide-field Infrared Survey Explorer, Candace measures between 6.205 and 8.56 kilometers in diameter and its surface has an albedo between 0.087 and 0.4213.

The Collaborative Asteroid Lightcurve Link assumes a standard albedo for stony members of the Phocaea family of 0.23 and calculates a diameter of 7.63 kilometers based on an absolute magnitude of 12.8.

== Naming ==
This minor planet was named after American chemist Candace P. Kohl, who has been investigating ancient solar activity through analysis of nuclides in lunar rocks. She has also contributed in the development of dating techniques of cosmic-ray-produced nuclides in Earth surface materials. She is known for her popular astronomy lectures. Citation provided by Kunihiko Nishiizumi (also see 4898 Nishiizumi) at the request of the discoverers. The approved naming citation was published by the Minor Planet Center on 12 July 1995 (M.P.C. 25443).
