= 5023 Agapenor =

Trojan asteroid

Discovery
- Discovered by: C. Shoemaker; E. Shoemaker
- Discovery site: Palomar Obs.
- Discovery date: 11 October 1985

Designations
- Pronunciation: /æɡəˈpiːnɔːr/
- Named after: Agapenor (Greek mythology)
- Alternative designations: 1985 TG_{3}
- Minor planet category: Jupiter trojan (Greek camp)

Orbital characteristics
- Epoch 4 September 2017 (JD 2458000.5)
- Uncertainty parameter 0
- Observation arc: 31.72 yr (11,585 days)
- Aphelion: 5.4430 AU
- Perihelion: 4.9085 AU
- Semi-major axis: 5.1758 AU
- Eccentricity: 0.0516
- Orbital period (sidereal): 11.78 yr (4,301 days)
- Mean anomaly: 227.44°
- Mean motion: 0° 5^{m} 1.32^{s} / day
- Inclination: 11.777°
- Longitude of ascending node: 308.36°
- Argument of perihelion: 84.242°
- Jupiter MOID: 0.0440 AU
- T_{Jupiter}: 2.9550

Physical characteristics
- Dimensions: 27.850±3.511 km 46.30 km (calculated)
- Synodic rotation period: 5.4020±0.0017 h
- Geometric albedo: 0.057 (assumed); 0.173±0.093
- Spectral type: X · C
- Absolute magnitude (H): 10.3 · 10.4 · 10.88±0.13

5023 Agapenor /æɡəˈpiːnɔːr/ is a Jupiter trojan from the Greek camp, approximately 30 kilometers in diameter. It was discovered on 11 October 1985, by American astronomer couple Carolyn and Eugene Shoemaker at the Palomar Observatory in California, United States. The Jovian asteroid was named for Agapenor from Greek mythology.

== Orbit and classification ==
Agapenor orbits in the leading Greek camp at Jupiter's L_{4} Lagrangian point, 60° ahead of its orbit (see Trojans in astronomy). It orbits the Sun in the outer main-belt at a distance of 4.9–5.4 AU once every 11 years and 9 months (4,301 days). Its orbit has an eccentricity of 0.05 and an inclination of 12° with respect to the ecliptic.

A precovery was taken at the discovering observatory in September 1985, extending the body's observation arc by 25 days prior to its official discovery observation.

== Physical characteristics ==
Agapenor has been characterized as an X-type asteroid by PanSTARRS photometric survey.

=== Rotation period ===
In September 2009, Agapenor was observed by Italian astronomer Stefano Mottola in a photometric survey of 80 Jupiter trojans, using the 1.2-meter reflector at Calar Alto Observatory in southeastern Spain. The obtained lightcurve gave a rotation period of 5.4020 hours with a brightness variation of 0.12 in magnitude (U=2+).

=== Diameter and albedo ===
According to the survey carried out by the NEOWISE mission of NASA's Wide-field Infrared Survey Explorer, Agapenor measures 27.9 kilometers in diameter and its surface has an albedo of 0.17.

The Collaborative Asteroid Lightcurve Link assumes a standard albedo for carbonaceous of 0.057 and calculates a significantly larger diameter of 46.3 kilometers.

== Naming ==
This minor planet was named from Greek mythology after Agapenor. He was the leader of the Greek contingent of Arcadians in the Trojan War. The minor planet 1020 Arcadia is named after this able group of warriors. Agapenor was the commander of 60 ships lend to him by Agamemnon, the king of Mycenae and leader of the Greeks in the Trojan War. 911 Agamemnon, one of the largest Jupiter trojans known to exist, is named after the commander of the Greek forces. The official naming citation was published by the Minor Planet Center on 12 July 1995 (M.P.C. 25443).
