= 4085 Weir =

Main-belt asteroid

Discovery
- Discovered by: C. Shoemaker
- Discovery site: Palomar Obs.
- Discovery date: 13 May 1985

Designations
- Named after: Doris Blackman Weir (American geologist)
- Alternative designations: 1985 JR · 1981 JY; 1982 XK
- Minor planet category: main-belt · (middle); Eunomia

Orbital characteristics
- Epoch 4 September 2017 (JD 2458000.5)
- Uncertainty parameter 0
- Observation arc: 36.57 yr (13,356 days)
- Aphelion: 2.8838 AU
- Perihelion: 2.3288 AU
- Semi-major axis: 2.6063 AU
- Eccentricity: 0.1065
- Orbital period (sidereal): 4.21 yr (1,537 days)
- Mean anomaly: 261.69°
- Mean motion: 0° 14^{m} 3.12^{s} / day
- Inclination: 14.220°
- Longitude of ascending node: 68.681°
- Argument of perihelion: 136.29°

Physical characteristics
- Dimensions: 9.221±0.241 km 9.579±0.048 km 9.66±0.77 km 11.30 km (calculated)
- Synodic rotation period: 14.602±0.005 h (Note: Lightcurve plot of 4085 Weir, Palmer Divide Observatory, B. D. Warner (2006). Rotation period 14.602±0.005 hours with a brightness amplitude of 0.18±0.02 mag. Summary figures at the LCDB); 14.657±0.0046 h
- Geometric albedo: 0.20 (assumed); 0.228±0.038; 0.2334±0.0274; 0.273±0.060
- Spectral type: S (Tholen)
- Absolute magnitude (H): 12.025±0.001 (R) · 12.1 · 12.30 · 12.38±0.22

4085 Weir, provisional designation 1985 JR, is a stony Eunomian asteroid from the central regions of the asteroid belt, approximately 10 kilometers in diameter. It was discovered on 13 May 1985, by astronomer Carolyn Shoemaker at the Palomar Observatory in California, United States. The asteroid was named after American geologist Doris Blackman Weir.

== Orbit and classification ==
Weir is a member of the Eunomia family (502), a prominent family of stony S-type asteroid and the largest one in the intermediate main belt with more than 5,000 members. It orbits the Sun in the central main-belt at a distance of 2.3–2.9 AU once every 4 years and 3 months (1,537 days; semi-major axis of 2.61 AU). Its orbit has an eccentricity of 0.11 and an inclination of 14° with respect to the ecliptic.

The body's observation arc begins with its first observation as 1981 JY at Anderson Mesa Station in May 1981, or four years prior to its official discovery observation at Palomar.

== Physical characteristics ==
In the Tholen classification, Weir is a common, stony S-type asteroid, which is also the overall spectral type for members of the Eunomia family.

=== Rotation period ===
In May 2006, a rotational lightcurve of Weir was obtained from photometric observations by Brian Warner at his Palmer Divide Observatory in Colorado. Lightcurve analysis gave a rotation period of 14.602 hours with a brightness variation of 0.18 magnitude (U=2). A concurring period of 14.657 hours and an amplitude of 0.24 magnitude was measured by astronomers at the Palomar Transient Factory in May 2010 (U=2).

=== Diameter and albedo ===
According to the surveys carried out by the Japanese Akari satellite and the NEOWISE mission of NASA's Wide-field Infrared Survey Explorer, Weir measures between 9.221 and 9.66 kilometers in diameter and its surface has an albedo between 0.228 and 0.273.

The Collaborative Asteroid Lightcurve Link assumes a standard albedo for stony asteroids of 0.20 and calculates a diameter of 11.30 kilometers based on an absolute magnitude of 12.1.

== Naming ==
This minor planet was named after American planetary geologist with the United States Geological Survey, Doris Blackman Weir. The approved naming citation was published by the Minor Planet Center on 12 December 1989 (M.P.C. 15576).
