= 3854 George =

Mars-crossing asteroid

Discovery
- Discovered by: C. Shoemaker; E. Shoemaker
- Discovery site: Palomar Obs.
- Discovery date: 13 March 1983

Designations
- Named after: George Shoemaker (discoverer's father-in-law)
- Alternative designations: 1983 EA
- Minor planet category: Mars-crosser · Hungaria background

Orbital characteristics
- Epoch 27 April 2019 (JD 2458600.5)
- Uncertainty parameter 0
- Observation arc: 35.61 yr (13,007 d)
- Aphelion: 2.1463 AU
- Perihelion: 1.6384 AU
- Semi-major axis: 1.8923 AU
- Eccentricity: 0.1342
- Orbital period (sidereal): 2.60 yr (951 d)
- Mean anomaly: 13.729°
- Mean motion: 0° 22^{m} 42.96^{s} / day
- Inclination: 24.207°
- Longitude of ascending node: 8.4004°
- Argument of perihelion: 87.500°
- Earth MOID: 0.7879 AU (306.9 LD)

Physical characteristics
- Mean diameter: 3.023±0.554 km 3.26±0.65 km 3.62±0.36 km
- Synodic rotation period: 3.3398±0.0002 h
- Geometric albedo: 0.22; 0.308; 0.458
- Spectral type: S (assumed)
- Absolute magnitude (H): 14.00; 14.10; 14.2; 14.72

3854 George, provisional designation: 1983 EA, is a stony Hungaria asteroid and Mars-crosser from the innermost regions of the asteroid belt, approximately 3.5 kilometers (2.2 miles) in diameter. It was discovered on 13 March 1983, by American astronomer couple Carolyn and Eugene Shoemaker at the Palomar Observatory in California. The unlikely synchronous binary system has a rotation period of 3.3 hours. It was named after the discoverer's father-in-law, George Shoemaker.

== Orbit and classification ==
George is a member of the Mars-crossing asteroids, a dynamically unstable group located between the main belt and the near-Earth populations, crossing the orbit of Mars at 1.66 AU. It is also a dynamical member of the Hungaria group.

It orbits the Sun in the innermost asteroid belt at a distance of 1.6–2.1 AU once every 2 years and 7 months (951 days; semi-major axis of 1.89 AU). Its orbit has a relatively low eccentricity of 0.13 and an inclination of 24° with respect to the ecliptic. The body's observation arc begins with its official discovery observation at Palomar in March 1983.

=== George family ===
Although George is a member of the dynamical Hungaria group, it is not a member of the collisional Hungaria family but an unrelated, non-family asteroid from the background population, according to Nesvorý, Milani and Knežević. However, in a 2014-abstract from the Asteroids, Comets, Meteors Conference in Helsinki (ACM 2014), George was mentioned as the principal body of a newly discovered low-density family in the Hungaria region.

== Naming ==
This minor planet was named after George Estel Shoemaker (1904–1960), father of Carolyn Shoemaker's husband Eugene Shoemaker (1928–1997), who has previously been credited as the second discoverer. The official naming citation was published by the Minor Planet Center on 12 December 1989 (M.P.C. 15574).

== Physical characteristics ==
George is an assumed stony S-type asteroid.

=== Lightcurve and satellite ===
In November 2005, a rotational lightcurve of George was obtained from photometric observations by Brian Warner at his Palmer Divide Observatory in Colorado, United States. Lightcurve analysis gave a rotation period of 3.3398±0.0002 hours with a brightness amplitude of 0.14 magnitude (U=3). The observations showed possible hints of George being a binary asteroid with a minor-planet moon in its orbit. However, no conclusive evidence was produced due to insufficient data for a valid lightcurve analysis.

Follow-up observations by Warner in February 2009 gave a concurring period of 3.338±0.001 hours and an amplitude of 0.12 magnitude (U=2) with no indications of mutual occultation/eclipsing events. (Note: Lightcurve plot of 3854 George, Palmer Divide Observatory, B. D. Warner (2009). Rotation period 3.338±0.001 hours with a brightness amplitude of 0.12±0.01 mag. Quality code is 3. Observers note: "The 2005 apparition had two suspicious nights (deviations that might be due to a satellite). There were no indications of such during this apparition." Summary figures for (3854) George at the LCDB.)

=== Diameter and albedo ===
According to the survey carried out by the NEOWISE mission of NASA's Wide-field Infrared Survey Explorer (WISE), George measures between 3.02 and 3.26 kilometers in diameter and its surface has an albedo between 0.22 and 0.46. In 2017, a WISE-study dedicated to Mars-crossing asteroids gave a somewhat larger diameter of 3.62 kilometers with an albedo of 0.308. The Collaborative Asteroid Lightcurve Link assumes an albedo of 0.30 and calculates a diameter of 3.67 kilometers based on an absolute magnitude of 14.1.
