= 5638 Deikoon =

Asteroid

Discovery
- Discovered by: C. S. Shoemaker; E. M. Shoemaker
- Discovery site: Palomar Obs.
- Discovery date: 10 October 1988

Designations
- Pronunciation: /diːˈɪkoʊɒn/
- Named after: Δηικόων Dēikoōn (Greek mythology)
- Alternative designations: 1988 TA_{3} · 1988 RJ_{1} 1989 TO_{2}
- Minor planet category: Jupiter trojan Trojan · background

Orbital characteristics
- Epoch 23 March 2018 (JD 2458200.5)
- Uncertainty parameter 0
- Observation arc: 29.43 yr (10,751 d)
- Aphelion: 5.8119 AU
- Perihelion: 4.6861 AU
- Semi-major axis: 5.2490 AU
- Eccentricity: 0.1072
- Orbital period (sidereal): 12.03 yr (4,392 d)
- Mean anomaly: 260.33°
- Mean motion: 0° 4^{m} 55.2^{s} / day
- Inclination: 10.908°
- Longitude of ascending node: 156.02°
- Argument of perihelion: 91.817°
- Jupiter MOID: 0.1902 AU
- T_{Jupiter}: 2.9520

Physical characteristics
- Mean diameter: 41.45±0.48 km 44.22 km (calculated); 63.33±3.32 km
- Synodic rotation period: 19.40±0.01 h
- Geometric albedo: 0.044±0.005; 0.057 (assumed); 0.071±0.010
- Spectral type: D (Pan-STARRS); D (SDSS-MOC); B–V = 0.730±0.060; V–R = 0.430±0.040; V–I = 0.910±0.041
- Absolute magnitude (H): 10.00; 10.4; 10.5

5638 Deikoon /diːˈɪkoʊɒn/ is a mid-sized Jupiter trojan from the Trojan camp, approximately 44 kilometers (27 miles) in diameter. It was discovered on 10 October 1988 by American astronomer couple Carolyn and Eugene Shoemaker at the Palomar Observatory in California. The dark and possibly spherical D-type asteroid has a rotation period of 19.4 hours. It was named after the Trojan hero Deicoon from Greek mythology.

== Orbit and classification ==
Deikoon is a dark Jupiter trojan in a 1:1 orbital resonance with Jupiter. It is located in the trailering Trojan camp at the Gas Giant's L_{5} Lagrangian point, 60° behind its orbit. It is also a non-family asteroid of the Jovian background population.

It orbits the Sun at a distance of 4.7–5.8 AU once every 12.03 years (4,392 days; semi-major axis of 5.25 AU). Its orbit has an eccentricity of 0.11 and an inclination of 11° with respect to the ecliptic. The body's observation arc begins with a precovery taken at Palomar in August 1988, just two months prior to its official discovery observation.

== Physical characteristics ==
Deikoon is a dark D-type asteroid, the most common spectral type among the Jupiter trojans, according to the SDSS-based taxonomy and the survey conducted by Pan-STARRS. It has a typical V–I color index of 0.91.

=== Rotation period ===
In February 1994, a rotational lightcurve of Deikoon was obtained from six nights of photometric observations by Stefano Mottola and Anders Erikson using the ESO 1-metre telescope at the La Silla Observatory in Chile. The irregular lightcurve showed a rotation period of 19.40±0.01 hours and a low brightness variation of 0.07 magnitude (U=2-).

In March 2007, a refined period of 19.40±0.01 hours with an amplitude of 0.14 magnitude was obtained by Lawrence Molnar at Calvin College, remotely operating the 0.4-meter telescope at the Calvin-Rehoboth Robotic Observatory in New Mexico (U=2). A low brightness amplitude is indicative of a spherical rather than elongated shape.

=== Diameter and albedo ===
According to the surveys carried out by the NEOWISE mission of NASA's Wide-field Infrared Survey Explorer and the Japanese Akari satellite, Deikoon measures 41.45 and 63.33 kilometers in diameter and its surface has an albedo of 0.071 and 0.044, respectively. The Collaborative Asteroid Lightcurve Link assumes a standard albedo for a carbonaceous asteroid of 0.057 and calculates a diameter of 44.22 kilometers based on an absolute magnitude of 10.5.

== Naming ==
This minor planet was named from Greek mythology after the Trojan hero Deicoon, son of Pergasos and a friend of Aeneas. During the Trojan War, Deicoon was killed by Agamemnon's spear penetrating his shield. The official naming citation was published by the Minor Planet Center on 12 July 1995 (M.P.C. 25444).
