= 7958 Leakey =

Main-belt asteroid binary

Discovery
- Discovered by: C. S. Shoemaker; E. M. Shoemaker
- Discovery site: Palomar Obs.
- Discovery date: 5 June 1994

Designations
- Named after: Leakey family (Mary, Louis, Richard)
- Alternative designations: 1994 LE_{3} · 1991 GT
- Minor planet category: main-belt · Hungaria

Orbital characteristics
- Epoch 4 September 2017 (JD 2458000.5)
- Uncertainty parameter 0
- Observation arc: 31.09 yr (11,355 days)
- Aphelion: 2.0211 AU
- Perihelion: 1.7329 AU
- Semi-major axis: 1.8770 AU
- Eccentricity: 0.0768
- Orbital period (sidereal): 2.57 yr (939 days)
- Mean anomaly: 296.31°
- Inclination: 21.973°
- Longitude of ascending node: 195.74°
- Argument of perihelion: 154.20°
- Known satellites: 1 (Note: Warner (2012): Lightcurve plot of 7958 Leakey and its minor-planet moon (second plot) at the Palmer Divide Observatory, B. D. Warner (2012)) (Note: Stephens (2015): lightcurve plot of (7958) Leakey with rotation period 2.34831±0.00003 hours and a brightness amplitude of 0.19 mag. Summary figures at Collaborative Asteroid Lightcurve Link (CALL))

Physical characteristics
- Dimensions: 2.94±0.17 km 3.35 km (calculated)
- Synodic rotation period: 2.34831±0.00003 h 2.34843±0.00006 h
- Geometric albedo: 0.30 (assumed); 0.468±0.073
- Spectral type: E
- Absolute magnitude (H): 14.3

7958 Leakey, provisional designation 1994 LE_{3}, is a Hungaria asteroid and synchronous binary system from the inner regions of the asteroid belt, approximately 3 kilometers in diameter.

It was discovered on 5 June 1994, by American astronomer-couple Carolyn and Eugene Shoemaker at the Palomar Observatory in California, United States. Its minor-planet moon was discovered in 2012. The asteroid was named after the members of the Leakey family: Mary, Louis and Richard.

== Orbit and classification ==
Leakey is a member of the Hungaria family, which form the innermost dense concentration of asteroids in the Solar System. It orbits the Sun in the inner main-belt at a distance of 1.7–2.0 AU once every 2 years and 7 months (939 days). Its orbit has an eccentricity of 0.08 and an inclination of 22° with respect to the ecliptic.

== Physical characteristics ==
Leakey is an assumed E-type asteroid.

=== Lightcurves ===
In 2012, and 2015, several lightcurves of Leakey were obtained by astronomers Brian Warner, Robert Stephens and Daniel Coley. Lightcurve analysis gave a concurring and well-defined rotation period of 2.35 hours with a brightness variation between 0.19 and 0.22 magnitude (U=3/3/3-). (Note: Daniel Coley (2012): lightcurve plot of (7958) Leakey, at the Center for Solar System Studies (CS3).)

=== Diameter and albedo ===
According to the survey carried out by the NEOWISE mission of NASA's Wide-field Infrared Survey Explorer, Leakey measures 2.94 kilometers in diameter and its surface has a high albedo of 0.468.

The Collaborative Asteroid Lightcurve Link assumes an albedo of 0.30 – a compromise value between 0.4 and 0.2, corresponding to the Hungaria asteroids both as family and orbital group – and calculates a diameter of 3.35 kilometers based on an absolute magnitude of 14.3.

=== Moon ===
The 2012-photometric lightcurve observation also revealed, that Leakey is a synchronous binary asteroid with a minor-planet moon orbiting it every 50.24 hours.

It is likely that the secondary body is tidally locked, which means that its rotation is synchronous with its orbital period. Based on only two observations at the Palmer Divide Observatory (716), it is tentatively estimated that the size-ratio of the binary system is 0.3±0.03, which would give a 1-kilometer diameter for the satellite.

== Naming ==
The minor planet is named after the Leakey's, a family of Kenyan paleoanthropologists: Mary Leakey (1913–1996), her husband Louis Leakey (1903–1972), and their son Richard Leakey (born 1944). Working for many years in Tanzania and Kenya, they conclusively proved that human evolution began in Africa rather than Asia. Richard explored the Koobi Fora archaeological site in Kenya, where many Hominin fossils have been found. The approved naming citation was published by the Minor Planet Center on 11 April 1998 (M.P.C. 31612).
