= Carolyn S. Shoemaker =

American astronomer (1929–2021)

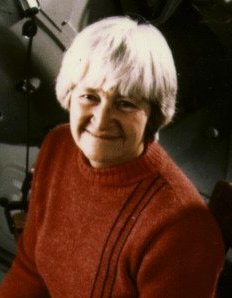
- Born: Carolyn Jean Spellmann; June 24, 1929; Gallup, New Mexico, U.S.
- Died: August 13, 2021 (aged 92); Flagstaff, Arizona, U.S.
- Education: CSU Chico
- Known for: Co-discovery of Comet Shoemaker–Levy 9
- Spouse: Eugene Merle Shoemaker (m. 1951; died 1997)
- Children: 3
- Awards: Rittenhouse Medal (1988); NASA Exceptional Scientific Achievement Medal (1996); James Craig Watson Medal (1998)
- Scientific career
- Fields: Astronomy
- Workplaces: California Institute of Technology; Palomar Observatory, California

Carolyn Jean Spellmann Shoemaker (June 24, 1929 – August 13, 2021) was an American astronomer and a co-discoverer of Comet Shoemaker–Levy 9. She discovered 32 comets (then a record for the most by an individual) and more than 500 asteroids.

Having earned degrees in history, political science, and English literature, she had little interest in planetary science until she met and married geologist Eugene Merle Shoemaker. Her career in astronomy began when she demonstrated good stereoscopic vision, a particularly valuable quality for looking for objects in near-Earth space. Despite the fact that her degrees were not in science, having that visual ability motivated the California Institute of Technology (Caltech) to hire her as a research assistant on a team led by her husband. She went on to making record-setting discoveries in the field of astronomy, as well as being awarded honorary degrees and many professional awards.

== Personal life ==
Shoemaker was born on June 24, 1929, in Gallup, New Mexico, to Hazel and Leonard Spellmann. Her family then moved to Chico, California, where she and her brother Richard grew up. She earned bachelor's and master's degrees in history, political science, and English literature from Chico State.

When her brother attended Caltech, his roommate was a graduate student Eugene Shoemaker. Carolyn first met him in the summer of 1950 at her brother's wedding. After graduating, Shoemaker had moved to New Jersey to work toward his doctoral degree at Princeton University. He had flown back to California to serve as Richard's best man. When Shoemaker returned to his studies at Princeton, Carolyn and he maintained a pen pal relationship and later both attended a two-week camping trip on the Cumberland Plateau. They were married on August 18, 1951 and had three children: Christy, Linda, and Patrick (Pat).

The Shoemaker family lived in Grand Junction, Colorado, Menlo Park, California, and Pasadena, California, before settling down in Flagstaff, Arizona, where she and her husband worked together at the Lowell Observatory. In 1997, Carolyn and Gene were involved in a car crash in Australia. Gene was killed instantly, while Carolyn sustained severe injuries.

Shoemaker died at age 92, after a fall on August 13, 2021.

Carolyn never really considered herself a scientist, although she absorbed a large amount of geology and astronomy from her husband. She was a forthright person, gifted with inordinate patience and a fine sense of humour. Before the Jupiter impacts, a reporter asked her what would happen if all the comet's fragments were to hit Earth instead. "We would all die," she answered. The interviewer explained that this was for a children's programme, then posed the question again. Carolyn's second answer: "We would all be very uncomfortable."

— David H. Levy

== Careers ==
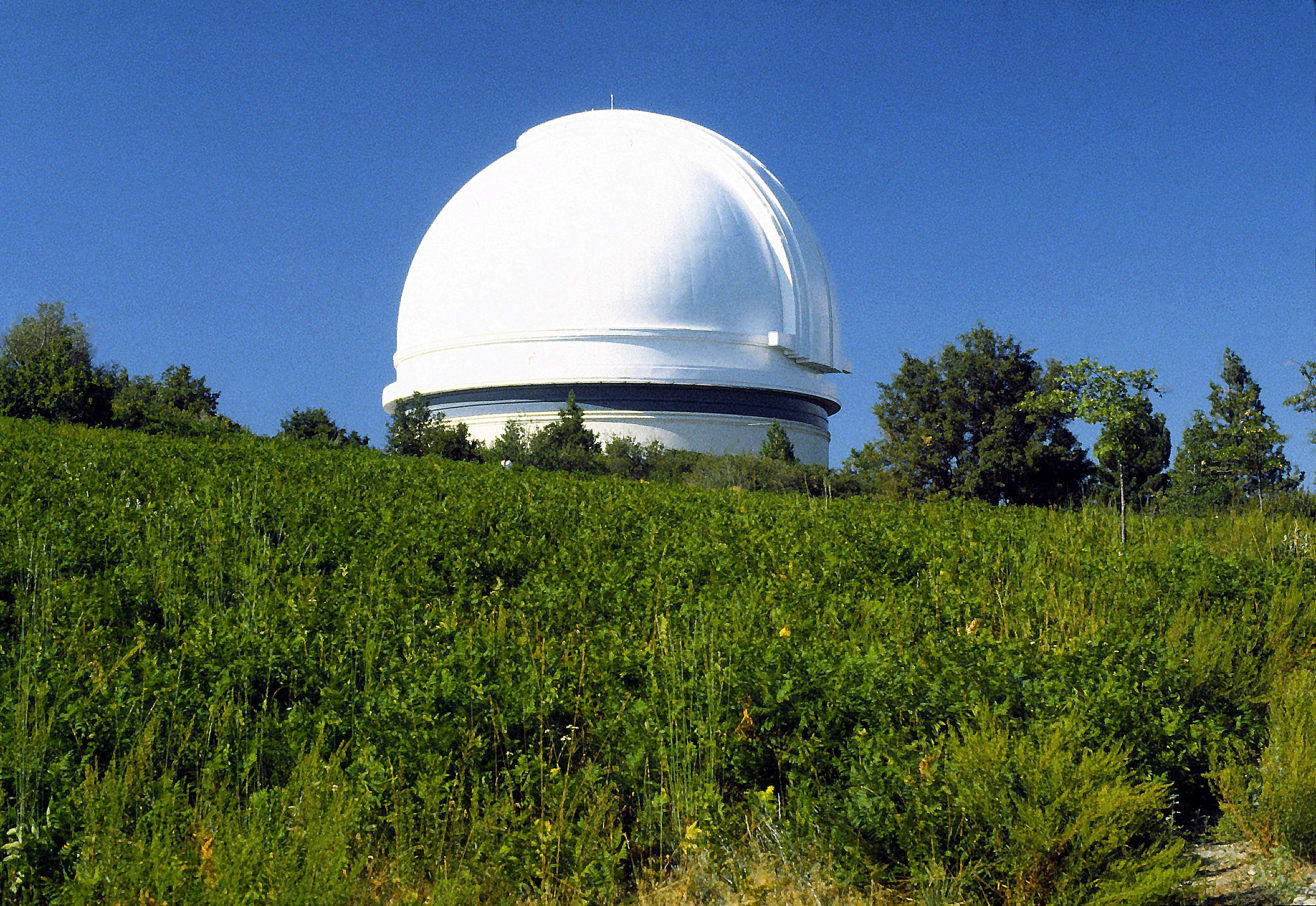
Palomar Observatory near San Diego, California, where Carolyn and Gene Shoemaker recorded many of their astronomical discoveries

Shortly after her marriage, the first job she held was teaching the seventh grade. Unsatisfied with the teaching profession, she quit to raise a family. Mary Chapman, author of Shoemaker's biography for the USGS Astrogeology Center, wrote "Carolyn is a warm, caring, and extremely patient woman, but her skills were better suited for a non-teaching environment." After her children had grown up and moved out, Shoemaker sought work. In her youth, she had never been interested in scientific topics. She had taken one course in geology, but found it extremely boring. However, she reportedly told others that, "listening to Gene explaining geology made what she had thought was a boring subject into an exciting and interesting pursuit of knowledge".

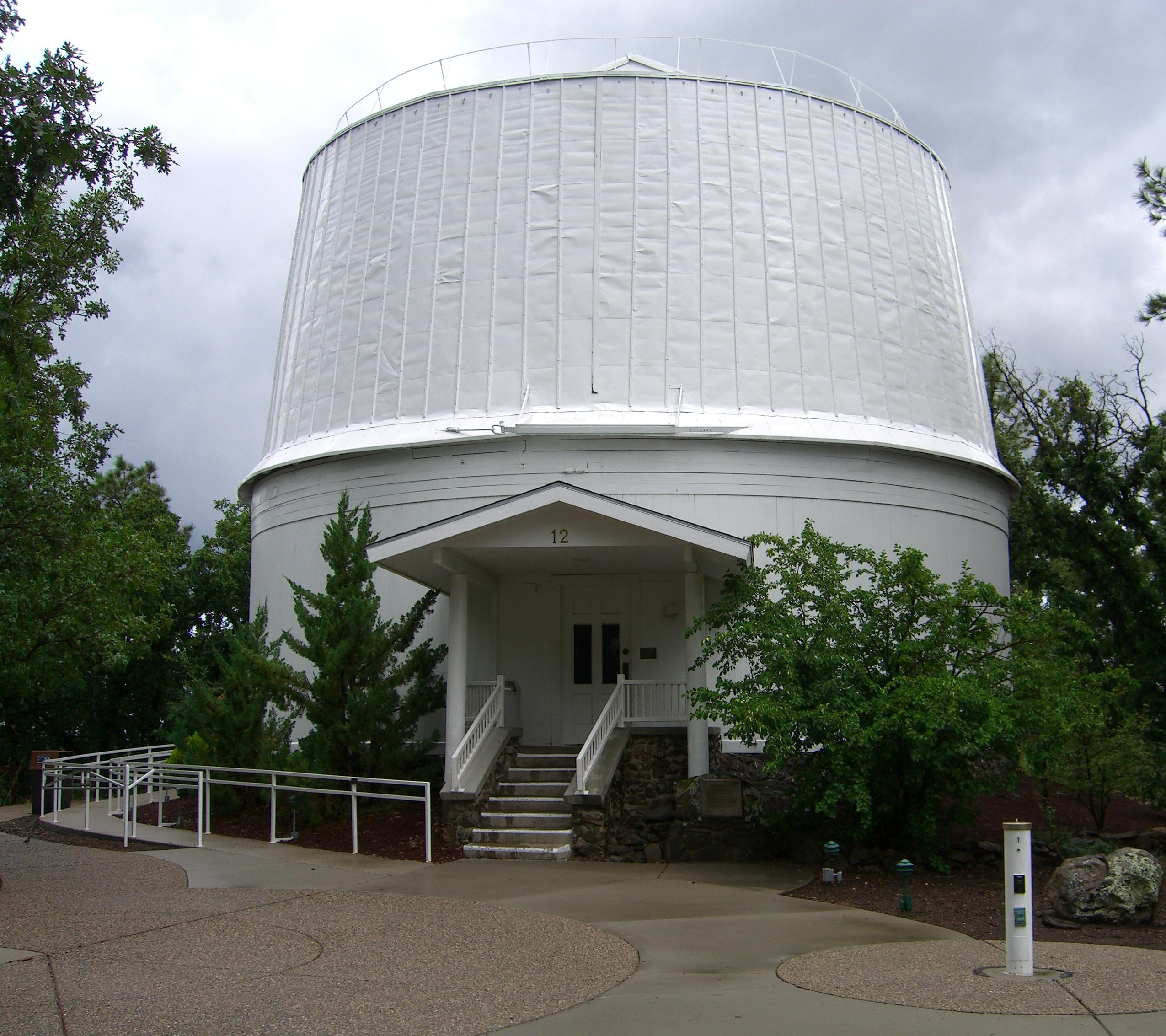
Clark Dome at Lowell Observatory

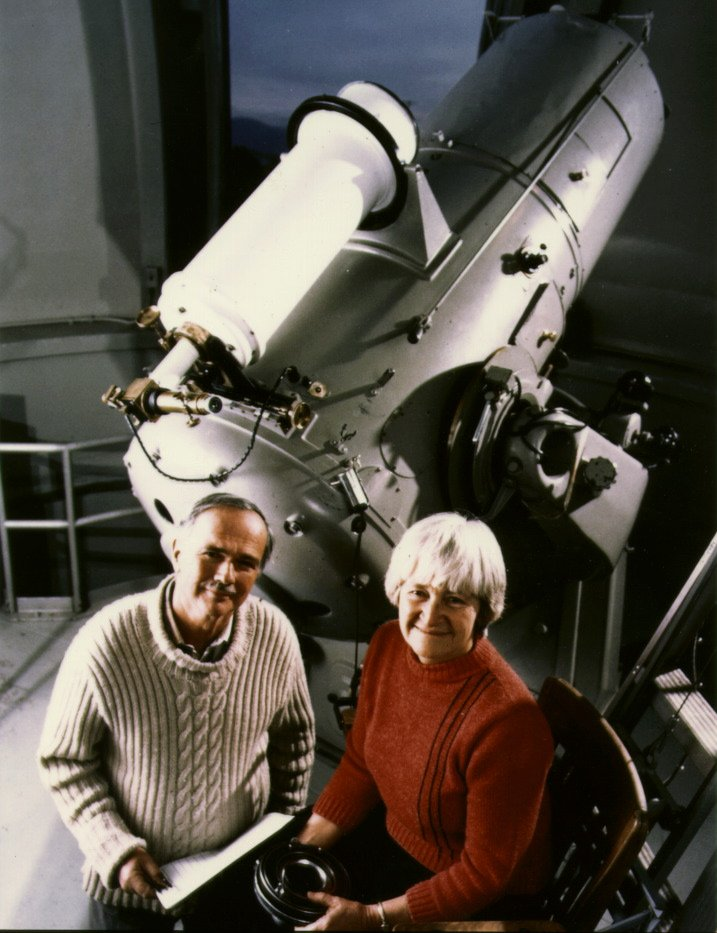
Gene and Carolyn Shoemaker, 1994

At the suggestion of her husband, she began studying astronomy from a student at Lowell Observatory. Then she began working as a field assistant for her husband. She worked on his search program mapping and analyzing impact craters.

Carolyn Shoemaker started her astronomical career in 1980, at age 51, searching for Earth-crossing asteroids and comets at California Institute of Technology, Pasadena, California, and the Palomar Observatory, San Diego, California. That year, Shoemaker was hired at the United States Geological Survey (USGS) as a visiting scientist in the astronomy branch, and then in 1989 began work as an astronomy research professor at Northern Arizona University. She concentrated her work on searching for comets and planet-crossing asteroids. Teamed with astronomer David H. Levy, the Shoemakers identified Shoemaker-Levy 9, a fragmented comet with an orbit that intersected that of Jupiter, on March 24, 1993.

In the 1980s and 1990s, Shoemaker used film taken at the wide-field telescope at the Palomar Observatory, combined with a stereoscope, to find objects that moved against the background of fixed stars.

Following recovery from the injuries she suffered in the 1997 automobile crash in which her husband was killed, she resumed her work at the Lowell Observatory with Levy. She was actively involved in astronomical observation work until at least 2002. As of 2002, Shoemaker had been credited with discovering or co-discovering 32 comets and over 500 asteroids.

== Awards and honors ==
The Hildian asteroid 4446 Carolyn, discovered by colleague Edward Bowell at Lowell Observatory in 1985, was named in her honor. In 1988, Shoemaker received the Rittenhouse Medal of the Rittenhouse Astronomical Society. In 1995, she received the Scientist of the Year Award, also from the Rittenhouse Astronomical Society.

In 1996, Shoemaker received an honorary doctorate degree from the Northern Arizona University, Flagstaff, Arizona and the U.S. National Aeronautics and Space Administration Exceptional Scientific Achievement Medal. In 1998, the U.S. National Academy of Sciences named both of the Shoemakers as the recipients of the James Craig Watson Medal.

The Carolyn Shoemaker formation within Gale crater, forms part of the broader Mount Sharp group was named after her. The formation is the layer of rocks that forms the strata within Glen Torridon - the layer of phyllosilicate rocks which was one of the primary objectives of the Mars Science Laboratory rover Curiosity during its ascent of Aeolis Mons.

== List of discovered minor planets ==
As of March 2022, Shoemaker is tied with Takeshi Urata for 80^{th} place on the Minor Planet Center's list of most discoveries with 377 numbered minor planets between the years 1980 and 1994.

List of minor planets discovered by Carolyn Shoemaker
Name	Discovery date	Listing
2459 Spellmann	June 11, 1980	List of minor planets: 2001–3000#459
2511 Patterson	June 11, 1980	List of minor planets: 2001–3000#511
2532 Sutton	October 9, 1980	List of minor planets: 2001–3000#532
2586 Matson	June 11, 1980	List of minor planets: 2001–3000#586
2614 Torrence	June 11, 1980	List of minor planets: 2001–3000#614
2686 Linda Susan	May 5, 1981	List of minor planets: 2001–3000#686
2705 Wu	October 9, 1980	List of minor planets: 2001–3000#705
2742 Gibson	May 6, 1981	List of minor planets: 2001–3000#742
2748 Patrick Gene	May 5, 1981	List of minor planets: 2001–3000#748
2773 Brooks	May 6, 1981	List of minor planets: 2001–3000#773
2834 Christy Carol	October 9, 1980	List of minor planets: 2001–3000#834
2891 McGetchin	June 18, 1980	List of minor planets: 2001–3000#891
2906 Caltech	January 13, 1983	List of minor planets: 2001–3000#906
2918 Salazar	October 9, 1980	List of minor planets: 2001–3000#918
2932 Kempchinsky	October 9, 1980	List of minor planets: 2001–3000#932
2982 Muriel	May 6, 1981	List of minor planets: 2001–3000#982
3025 Higson	August 20, 1982	List of minor planets: 3001–4000#025^{[A]}
3107 Weaver	May 5, 1981	List of minor planets: 3001–4000#107
3161 Beadell	October 9, 1980	List of minor planets: 3001–4000#161
3194 Dorsey	May 27, 1982	List of minor planets: 3001–4000#194
3199 Nefertiti	September 13, 1982	List of minor planets: 3001–4000#199^{[A]}
3225 Hoag	August 20, 1982	List of minor planets: 3001–4000#225^{[A]}
3270 Dudley	February 18, 1982	List of minor planets: 3001–4000#270^{[B]}
3285 Ruth Wolfe	November 5, 1983	List of minor planets: 3001–4000#285
3299 Hall	October 10, 1980	List of minor planets: 3001–4000#299
3317 Paris	May 26, 1984	List of minor planets: 3001–4000#317^{[A]}
3333 Schaber	October 9, 1980	List of minor planets: 3001–4000#333
3375 Amy	May 5, 1981	List of minor planets: 3001–4000#375
3430 Bradfield	October 9, 1980	List of minor planets: 3001–4000#430
3553 Mera	May 14, 1985	List of minor planets: 3001–4000#553
3554 Amun	March 4, 1986	List of minor planets: 3001–4000#554^{[A]}
3581 Alvarez	April 23, 1985	List of minor planets: 3001–4000#581
3640 Gostin	October 11, 1985	List of minor planets: 3001–4000#640
3671 Dionysus	May 27, 1984	List of minor planets: 3001–4000#671^{[A]}
3689 Yeates	May 5, 1981	List of minor planets: 3001–4000#689
3700 Geowilliams	October 23, 1984	List of minor planets: 3001–4000#700^{[A]}
3709 Polypoites	October 14, 1985	List of minor planets: 3001–4000#709
3777 McCauley	May 5, 1981	List of minor planets: 3001–4000#777
3779 Kieffer	May 13, 1985	List of minor planets: 3001–4000#779
3792 Preston	March 22, 1985	List of minor planets: 3001–4000#792
3793 Leonteus	October 11, 1985	List of minor planets: 3001–4000#793
3794 Sthenelos	October 12, 1985	List of minor planets: 3001–4000#794
3837 Carr	May 6, 1981	List of minor planets: 3001–4000#837
3840 Mimistrobell	October 9, 1980	List of minor planets: 3001–4000#840
3846 Hazel	October 9, 1980	List of minor planets: 3001–4000#846
3854 George	March 13, 1983	List of minor planets: 3001–4000#854
3873 Roddy	November 21, 1984	List of minor planets: 3001–4000#873
3880 Kaiserman	November 21, 1984	List of minor planets: 3001–4000#880^{[A]}
3888 Hoyt	March 28, 1984	List of minor planets: 3001–4000#888
3895 Earhart	February 23, 1987	List of minor planets: 3001–4000#895
3906 Chao	May 31, 1987	List of minor planets: 3001–4000#906
3927 Feliciaplatt	May 5, 1981	List of minor planets: 3001–4000#927^{[A]}
3932 Edshay	September 27, 1984	List of minor planets: 3001–4000#932^{[C]}
3972 Richard	May 6, 1981	List of minor planets: 3001–4000#972
3977 Maxine	June 14, 1983	List of minor planets: 3001–4000#977
3985 Raybatson	February 12, 1985	List of minor planets: 3001–4000#985
4029 Bridges	May 24, 1982	List of minor planets: 4001–5000#029
4031 Mueller	February 12, 1985	List of minor planets: 4001–5000#031
4082 Swann	September 27, 1984	List of minor planets: 4001–5000#082
4083 Jody	February 12, 1985	List of minor planets: 4001–5000#083
4085 Weir	May 13, 1985	List of minor planets: 4001–5000#085
4151 Alanhale	April 24, 1985	List of minor planets: 4001–5000#151^{[A]}
4153 Roburnham	May 14, 1985	List of minor planets: 4001–5000#153
4171 Carrasco	March 23, 1982	List of minor planets: 4001–5000#171
4173 Thicksten	May 27, 1982	List of minor planets: 4001–5000#173
4203 Brucato	March 26, 1985	List of minor planets: 4001–5000#203
4204 Barsig	May 11, 1985	List of minor planets: 4001–5000#204
4217 Engelhardt	January 24, 1988	List of minor planets: 4001–5000#217
4251 Kavasch	May 11, 1985	List of minor planets: 4001–5000#251
4253 Märker	October 11, 1985	List of minor planets: 4001–5000#253
4283 Stöffler	January 23, 1988	List of minor planets: 4001–5000#283
4327 Ries	May 24, 1982	List of minor planets: 4001–5000#327
4332 Milton	September 5, 1983	List of minor planets: 4001–5000#332
4340 Dence	May 4, 1986	List of minor planets: 4001–5000#340
4341 Poseidon	May 29, 1987	List of minor planets: 4001–5000#341
4348 Poulydamas	September 11, 1988	List of minor planets: 4001–5000#348
4368 Pillmore	May 5, 1981	List of minor planets: 4001–5000#368
4379 Snelling	August 13, 1988	List of minor planets: 4001–5000#379^{[A]}
4401 Aditi	October 14, 1985	List of minor planets: 4001–5000#401
4435 Holt	January 13, 1983	List of minor planets: 4001–5000#435
4448 Phildavis	March 5, 1986	List of minor planets: 4001–5000#448
4450 Pan	September 25, 1987	List of minor planets: 4001–5000#450^{[A]}
4451 Grieve	May 9, 1988	List of minor planets: 4001–5000#451
4487 Pocahontas	October 17, 1987	List of minor planets: 4001–5000#487
4503 Cleobulus	November 28, 1989	List of minor planets: 4001–5000#503
4531 Asaro	March 20, 1985	List of minor planets: 4001–5000#531
4533 Orth	March 7, 1986	List of minor planets: 4001–5000#533
4543 Phoinix	February 2, 1989	List of minor planets: 4001–5000#543
4569 Baerbel	April 15, 1985	List of minor planets: 4001–5000#569
4582 Hank	March 31, 1989	List of minor planets: 4001–5000#582
4624 Stefani	March 23, 1982	List of minor planets: 4001–5000#624
4666 Dietz	May 4, 1986	List of minor planets: 4001–5000#666
4673 Bortle	June 8, 1988	List of minor planets: 4001–5000#673
4707 Khryses	August 13, 1988	List of minor planets: 4001–5000#707
4708 Polydoros	September 11, 1988	List of minor planets: 4001–5000#708
4709 Ennomos	October 12, 1988	List of minor planets: 4001–5000#709
4736 Johnwood	January 13, 1983	List of minor planets: 4001–5000#736
4765 Wasserburg	May 5, 1986	List of minor planets: 4001–5000#765
4783 Wasson	January 12, 1983	List of minor planets: 4001–5000#783
4791 Iphidamas	August 14, 1988	List of minor planets: 4001–5000#791
4792 Lykaon	September 10, 1988	List of minor planets: 4001–5000#792
4805 Asteropaios	November 13, 1990	List of minor planets: 4001–5000#805
4820 Fay	September 15, 1985	List of minor planets: 4001–5000#820
4826 Wilhelms	May 11, 1988	List of minor planets: 4001–5000#826
4827 Dares	August 17, 1988	List of minor planets: 4001–5000#827
4828 Misenus	September 11, 1988	List of minor planets: 4001–5000#828
4829 Sergestus	September 10, 1988	List of minor planets: 4001–5000#829
4832 Palinurus	October 12, 1988	List of minor planets: 4001–5000#832
4833 Meges	January 8, 1989	List of minor planets: 4001–5000#833
4834 Thoas	January 11, 1989	List of minor planets: 4001–5000#834
4836 Medon	February 2, 1989	List of minor planets: 4001–5000#836
4856 Seaborg	June 11, 1983	List of minor planets: 4001–5000#856
4857 Altgamia	March 29, 1984	List of minor planets: 4001–5000#857
4867 Polites	September 27, 1989	List of minor planets: 4001–5000#867
4885 Grange	June 10, 1980	List of minor planets: 4001–5000#885
4888 Doreen	May 5, 1981	List of minor planets: 4001–5000#888
4898 Nishiizumi	March 19, 1988	List of minor planets: 4001–5000#898
4899 Candace	May 9, 1988	List of minor planets: 4001–5000#899^{[A]}
4902 Thessandrus	January 9, 1989	List of minor planets: 4001–5000#902
4946 Askalaphus	January 21, 1988	List of minor planets: 4001–5000#946^{[A]}
4947 Ninkasi	October 12, 1988	List of minor planets: 4001–5000#947
5023 Agapenor	October 11, 1985	List of minor planets: 5001–6000#023^{[A]}
5027 Androgeos	January 21, 1988	List of minor planets: 5001–6000#027
5028 Halaesus	January 23, 1988	List of minor planets: 5001–6000#028
5029 Ireland	January 24, 1988	List of minor planets: 5001–6000#029^{[A]}
5052 Nancyruth	October 23, 1984	List of minor planets: 5001–6000#052^{[A]}
5120 Bitias	October 13, 1988	List of minor planets: 5001–6000#120
5126 Achaemenides	February 1, 1989	List of minor planets: 5001–6000#126
5130 Ilioneus	September 30, 1989	List of minor planets: 5001–6000#130
5143 Heracles	November 7, 1991	List of minor planets: 5001–6000#143
5144 Achates	December 2, 1991	List of minor planets: 5001–6000#144
5161 Wightman	October 9, 1980	List of minor planets: 5001–6000#161
5167 Joeharms	April 11, 1985	List of minor planets: 5001–6000#167^{[A]}
5168 Jenner	March 6, 1986	List of minor planets: 5001–6000#168^{[A]}
5175 Ables	November 4, 1988	List of minor planets: 5001–6000#175^{[A]}
5211 Stevenson	July 8, 1989	List of minor planets: 5001–6000#211^{[A]}
5231 Verne	May 9, 1988	List of minor planets: 5001–6000#231
5259 Epeigeus	January 30, 1989	List of minor planets: 5001–6000#259^{[A]}
5264 Telephus	May 17, 1991	List of minor planets: 5001–6000#264^{[A]}
5283 Pyrrhus	January 31, 1989	List of minor planets: 5001–6000#283
5284 Orsilocus	February 1, 1989	List of minor planets: 5001–6000#284^{[A]}
5285 Krethon	March 9, 1989	List of minor planets: 5001–6000#285^{[A]}
5317 Verolacqua	February 11, 1983	List of minor planets: 5001–6000#317
5325 Silver	May 12, 1988	List of minor planets: 5001–6000#325
5381 Sekhmet	May 14, 1991	List of minor planets: 5001–6000#381
5392 Parker	January 12, 1986	List of minor planets: 5001–6000#392
5426 Sharp	February 16, 1985	List of minor planets: 5001–6000#426
5430 Luu	May 12, 1988	List of minor planets: 5001–6000#430^{[A]}
5436 Eumelos	February 20, 1990	List of minor planets: 5001–6000#436^{[A]}
5457 Queen's	October 9, 1980	List of minor planets: 5001–6000#457
5511 Cloanthus	October 8, 1988	List of minor planets: 5001–6000#511^{[A]}
5547 Acadiau	June 11, 1980	List of minor planets: 5001–6000#547
5551 Glikson	January 24, 1982	List of minor planets: 5001–6000#551^{[A]}
5579 Uhlherr	May 11, 1988	List of minor planets: 5001–6000#579^{[A]}
5632 Ingelehmann	April 15, 1993	List of minor planets: 5001–6000#632^{[A]}
5637 Gyas	September 10, 1988	List of minor planets: 5001–6000#637^{[A]}
5638 Deikoon	October 10, 1988	List of minor planets: 5001–6000#638^{[A]}
5652 Amphimachus	April 24, 1992	List of minor planets: 5001–6000#652^{[A]}
5670 Rosstaylor	November 7, 1985	List of minor planets: 5001–6000#670^{[A]}
5720 Halweaver	March 29, 1984	List of minor planets: 5001–6000#720^{[A]}
5725 Nördlingen	January 23, 1988	List of minor planets: 5001–6000#725^{[A]}
5726 Rubin	January 24, 1988	List of minor planets: 5001–6000#726^{[A]}
5731 Zeus	November 4, 1988	List of minor planets: 5001–6000#731^{[A]}
5765 Izett	April 4, 1986	List of minor planets: 5001–6000#765^{[A]}
5799 Brewington	October 9, 1980	List of minor planets: 5001–6000#799
5852 Nanette	April 19, 1991	List of minor planets: 5001–6000#852^{[D]}
5863 Tara	September 7, 1983	List of minor planets: 5001–6000#863^{[A]}
5869 Tanith	November 4, 1988	List of minor planets: 5001–6000#869
5899 Jedicke	January 9, 1986	List of minor planets: 5001–6000#899^{[A]}
5947 Bonnie	March 21, 1985	List of minor planets: 5001–6000#947^{[A]}
5953 Shelton	April 25, 1987	List of minor planets: 5001–6000#953^{[A]}
5957 Irina	May 11, 1988	List of minor planets: 5001–6000#957^{[A]}
5967 Edithlevy	February 9, 1991	List of minor planets: 5001–6000#967
5999 Plescia	April 23, 1987	List of minor planets: 5001–6000#999^{[A]}
6063 Jason	May 27, 1984	List of minor planets: 6001–7000#063^{[A]}
6078 Burt	October 10, 1980	List of minor planets: 6001–7000#078
6084 Bascom	February 12, 1985	List of minor planets: 6001–7000#084^{[A]}
6087 Lupo	March 19, 1988	List of minor planets: 6001–7000#087^{[A]}
6179 Brett	March 3, 1986	List of minor planets: 6001–7000#179^{[A]}
6183 Viscome	September 26, 1987	List of minor planets: 6001–7000#183
6204 MacKenzie	May 6, 1981	List of minor planets: 6001–7000#204
6239 Minos	August 31, 1989	List of minor planets: 6001–7000#239^{[A]}
6282 Edwelda	October 9, 1980	List of minor planets: 6001–7000#282
6372 Walker	May 13, 1985	List of minor planets: 6001–7000#372^{[A]}
6376 Schamp	May 29, 1987	List of minor planets: 6001–7000#376^{[A]}
6398 Timhunter	February 10, 1991	List of minor planets: 6001–7000#398^{[A]}^{[D]}
6401 Roentgen	April 15, 1991	List of minor planets: 6001–7000#401^{[A]}^{[D]}
6436 Coco	May 13, 1985	List of minor planets: 6001–7000#436^{[A]}
6478 Gault	May 12, 1988	List of minor planets: 6001–7000#478^{[A]}
6485 Wendeesther	October 25, 1990	List of minor planets: 6001–7000#485^{[A]}^{[D]}
6510 Tarry	February 23, 1987	List of minor planets: 6001–7000#510^{[A]}
6543 Senna	October 11, 1985	List of minor planets: 6001–7000#543^{[A]}
6585 O'Keefe	September 26, 1984	List of minor planets: 6001–7000#585^{[A]}
6635 Zuber	September 26, 1987	List of minor planets: 6001–7000#635^{[A]}
6670 Wallach	June 4, 1994	List of minor planets: 6001–7000#670^{[D]}
6740 Goff	April 14, 1993	List of minor planets: 6001–7000#740^{[A]}
6898 Saint-Marys	June 8, 1988	List of minor planets: 6001–7000#898
6901 Roybishop	August 2, 1989	List of minor planets: 6001–7000#901^{[A]}
6909 Levison	January 19, 1991	List of minor planets: 6001–7000#909^{[A]}
6914 Becquerel	April 3, 1992	List of minor planets: 6001–7000#914^{[D]}^{[E]}
7051 Sean	May 13, 1985	List of minor planets: 7001–8000#051^{[A]}
7086 Bopp	October 5, 1991	List of minor planets: 7001–8000#086^{[A]}
7088 Ishtar	January 1, 1992	List of minor planets: 7001–8000#088^{[A]}
7092 Cadmus	June 4, 1992	List of minor planets: 7001–8000#092^{[A]}
7112 Ghislaine	April 3, 1986	List of minor planets: 7001–8000#112^{[A]}
7119 Hiera	January 11, 1989	List of minor planets: 7001–8000#119^{[A]}
7167 Laupheim	October 12, 1985	List of minor planets: 7001–8000#167^{[A]}
7173 Sepkoski	August 15, 1988	List of minor planets: 7001–8000#173^{[A]}
7344 Summerfield	June 4, 1992	List of minor planets: 7001–8000#344^{[D]}
7480 Norwan	August 1, 1994	List of minor planets: 7001–8000#480^{[A]}
7549 Woodard	October 9, 1980	List of minor planets: 7001–8000#549^{[A]}
7560 Spudis	January 10, 1986	List of minor planets: 7001–8000#560^{[A]}
7749 Jackschmitt	May 12, 1988	List of minor planets: 7001–8000#749^{[A]}
7750 McEwen	August 18, 1988	List of minor planets: 7001–8000#750^{[A]}
7756 Scientia	March 27, 1990	List of minor planets: 7001–8000#756^{[A]}
7778 Markrobinson	April 17, 1993	List of minor planets: 7001–8000#778^{[A]}
7958 Leakey	June 5, 1994	List of minor planets: 7001–8000#958^{[A]}
8021 Walter	October 22, 1990	List of minor planets: 8001–9000#021^{[D]}
8034 Akka	June 3, 1992	List of minor planets: 8001–9000#034^{[A]}
8149 Ruff	May 11, 1985	List of minor planets: 8001–9000#149^{[A]}
8326 Paulkling	May 6, 1981	List of minor planets: 8001–9000#326^{[A]}
8327 Weihenmayer	May 6, 1981	List of minor planets: 8001–9000#327^{[A]}
8331 Dawkins	May 27, 1982	List of minor planets: 8001–9000#331^{[B]}
8347 Lallaward	April 21, 1987	List of minor planets: 8001–9000#347^{[A]}
8356 Wadhwa	September 3, 1989	List of minor planets: 8001–9000#356^{[A]}
8358 Rickblakley	November 4, 1989	List of minor planets: 8001–9000#358^{[D]}
8373 Stephengould	January 1, 1992	List of minor planets: 8001–9000#373^{[A]}
8709 Kadlu	May 14, 1994	List of minor planets: 8001–9000#709^{[A]}
8804 Eliason	May 5, 1981	List of minor planets: 8001–9000#804^{[A]}
8817 Roytraver	May 13, 1985	List of minor planets: 8001–9000#817^{[A]}
9016 Henrymoore	January 10, 1986	List of minor planets: 9001–10000#016^{[A]}
9022 Drake	August 14, 1988	List of minor planets: 9001–10000#022^{[A]}
9023 Mnesthus	September 10, 1988	List of minor planets: 9001–10000#023^{[A]}
9070 Ensab	July 23, 1993	List of minor planets: 9001–10000#070^{[D]}
9082 Leonardmartin	November 4, 1994	List of minor planets: 9001–10000#082^{[A]}
9083 Ramboehm	November 28, 1994	List of minor planets: 9001–10000#083^{[D]}
9165 Raup	September 27, 1987	List of minor planets: 9001–10000#165^{[A]}
9172 Abhramu	July 29, 1989	List of minor planets: 9001–10000#172^{[A]}
9277 Togashi	October 9, 1980	List of minor planets: 9001–10000#277^{[A]}
9299 Vinceteri	May 13, 1985	List of minor planets: 9001–10000#299^{[A]}
9564 Jeffwynn	September 26, 1987	List of minor planets: 9001–10000#564^{[A]}
9739 Powell	September 26, 1987	List of minor planets: 9001–10000#739
9744 Nielsen	May 9, 1988	List of minor planets: 9001–10000#744^{[A]}
9768 Stephenmaran	April 5, 1992	List of minor planets: 9001–10000#768^{[A]}
10028 Bonus	May 5, 1981	List of minor planets: 10001–11000#028
10041 Parkinson	April 24, 1985	List of minor planets: 10001–11000#041^{[A]}
10044 Squyres	September 15, 1985	List of minor planets: 10001–11000#044^{[A]}
10060 Amymilne	April 12, 1988	List of minor planets: 10001–11000#060^{[A]}
10108 Tomlinson	April 26, 1992	List of minor planets: 10001–11000#108^{[A]}
10283 Cromer	May 5, 1981	List of minor planets: 10001–11000#283
10295 Hippolyta	April 12, 1988	List of minor planets: 10001–11000#295^{[A]}
10332 Défi	May 13, 1991	List of minor planets: 10001–11000#332^{[D]}
10346 Triathlon	April 2, 1992	List of minor planets: 10001–11000#346^{[D]}
10487 Danpeterson	April 14, 1985	List of minor planets: 10001–11000#487^{[A]}
10563 Izhdubar	November 19, 1993	List of minor planets: 10001–11000#563^{[A]}
10683 Carter	June 10, 1980	List of minor planets: 10001–11000#683^{[A]}
10739 Lowman	May 12, 1988	List of minor planets: 10001–11000#739^{[A]}
11006 Gilson	October 9, 1980	List of minor planets: 11001–12000#006^{[A]}
11066 Sigurd	February 9, 1992	List of minor planets: 11001–12000#066^{[A]}
11277 Ballard	October 8, 1988	List of minor planets: 11001–12000#277^{[A]}
11311 Peleus	December 10, 1993	List of minor planets: 11001–12000#311^{[A]}
11548 Jerrylewis	November 25, 1992	List of minor planets: 11001–12000#548^{[D]}
11569 Virgilsmith	May 27, 1993	List of minor planets: 11001–12000#569^{[D]}
11836 Eileen	February 5, 1986	List of minor planets: 11001–12000#836^{[A]}
11911 Angel	June 4, 1992	List of minor planets: 11001–12000#911^{[D]}
11941 Archinal	May 23, 1993	List of minor planets: 11001–12000#941^{[D]}
12227 Penney	October 11, 1985	List of minor planets: 12001–13000#227^{[A]}
12237 Coughlin	April 23, 1987	List of minor planets: 12001–13000#237^{[A]}
12242 Koon	August 18, 1988	List of minor planets: 12001–13000#242^{[A]}
12675 Chabot	October 9, 1980	List of minor planets: 12001–13000#675^{[A]}
12680 Bogdanovich	May 6, 1981	List of minor planets: 12001–13000#680
12714 Alkimos	April 15, 1991	List of minor planets: 12001–13000#714^{[A]}
12753 Povenmire	April 18, 1993	List of minor planets: 12001–13000#753^{[A]}
13057 Jorgensen	November 13, 1990	List of minor planets: 13001–14000#057^{[D]}
13062 Podarkes	April 19, 1991	List of minor planets: 13001–14000#062^{[A]}
13111 Papacosmas	July 23, 1993	List of minor planets: 13001–14000#111^{[D]}
13123 Tyson	May 16, 1994	List of minor planets: 13001–14000#123^{[D]}
13615 Manulis	November 28, 1994	List of minor planets: 13001–14000#615^{[D]}
13914 Galegant	June 11, 1980	List of minor planets: 13001–14000#914
13915 Yalow	May 27, 1982	List of minor planets: 13001–14000#915^{[B]}
13937 Roberthargraves	August 2, 1989	List of minor planets: 13001–14000#937^{[A]}
14429 Coyne	December 3, 1991	List of minor planets: 14001–15000#429^{[D]}
14827 Hypnos	May 5, 1986	List of minor planets: 14001–15000#827^{[A]}
14835 Holdridge	November 26, 1987	List of minor planets: 14001–15000#835^{[A]}
15228 Ronmiller	February 23, 1987	List of minor planets: 15001–16000#228^{[A]}
15276 Diebel	April 14, 1991	List of minor planets: 15001–16000#276^{[D]}
15294 Underwood	November 7, 1991	List of minor planets: 15001–16000#294^{[D]}
15304 Wikberg	October 21, 1992	List of minor planets: 15001–16000#304^{[A]}
15318 Innsbruck	May 24, 1993	List of minor planets: 15001–16000#318
15321 Donnadean	August 13, 1993	List of minor planets: 15001–16000#321^{[D]}
15779 Scottroberts	July 26, 1993	List of minor planets: 15001–16000#779^{[D]}
16452 Goldfinger	September 28, 1989	List of minor planets: 16001–17000#452^{[A]}
16514 Stevelia	November 11, 1990	List of minor planets: 16001–17000#514^{[D]}
16641 Esteban	August 16, 1993	List of minor planets: 16001–17000#641^{[A]}
16666 Liroma	December 7, 1993	List of minor planets: 16001–17000#666
16669 Rionuevo	December 8, 1993	List of minor planets: 16001–17000#669^{[D]}
17399 Andysanto	September 6, 1983	List of minor planets: 17001–18000#399^{[A]}
17408 McAdams	October 19, 1987	List of minor planets: 17001–18000#408^{[A]}
17493 Wildcat	December 31, 1991	List of minor planets: 17001–18000#493^{[D]}
18368 Flandrau	April 15, 1991	List of minor planets: 18001–19000#368^{[D]}
18434 Mikesandras	March 12, 1994	List of minor planets: 18001–19000#434^{[D]}
19140 Jansmit	September 2, 1989	List of minor planets: 19001–20000#140^{[A]}
19173 Virginiaterése	April 15, 1991	List of minor planets: 19001–20000#173^{[A]}
19243 Bunting	February 10, 1994	List of minor planets: 19001–20000#243^{[A]}
19980 Barrysimon	November 22, 1989	List of minor planets: 19001–20000#980^{[D]}
20007 Marybrown	June 7, 1991	List of minor planets: 20001–21000#007^{[A]}
20037 Duke	October 20, 1992	List of minor planets: 20001–21000#037^{[A]}
20084 Buckmaster	April 6, 1994	List of minor planets: 20001–21000#084^{[D]}
21062 Iasky	May 13, 1991	List of minor planets: 21001–22000#062^{[A]}
21148 Billramsey	April 16, 1993	List of minor planets: 21001–22000#148^{[A]}
21149 Kenmitchell	April 19, 1993	List of minor planets: 21001–22000#149^{[A]}
22294 Simmons	September 28, 1989	List of minor planets: 22001–23000#294^{[A]}
22312 Kelly	April 14, 1991	List of minor planets: 22001–23000#312^{[D]}
22338 Janemojo	June 3, 1992	List of minor planets: 22001–23000#338^{[D]}
23452 Drew	August 18, 1988	List of minor planets: 23001–24000#452^{[A]}
24626 Astrowizard	October 9, 1980	List of minor planets: 24001–25000#626^{[A]}
24643 MacCready	September 28, 1984	List of minor planets: 24001–25000#643^{[A]}
24654 Fossett	May 29, 1987	List of minor planets: 24001–25000#654^{[A]}
24761 Ahau	January 28, 1993	List of minor planets: 24001–25000#761^{[A]}
24778 Nemsu	May 24, 1993	List of minor planets: 24001–25000#778^{[D]}
24779 Presque Isle	July 23, 1993	List of minor planets: 24001–25000#779^{[D]}
26879 Haines	July 9, 1994	List of minor planets: 26001–27000#879^{[A]}
27706 Strogen	October 11, 1985	List of minor planets: 27001–28000#706^{[A]}
27711 Kirschvink	November 4, 1988	List of minor planets: 27001–28000#711^{[A]}
27776 Cortland	February 25, 1992	List of minor planets: 27001–28000#776^{[D]}
27810 Daveturner	July 23, 1993	List of minor planets: 27001–28000#810^{[D]}
29133 Vargas	May 29, 1987	List of minor planets: 29001–30000#133^{[A]}
29137 Alanboss	October 18, 1987	List of minor planets: 29001–30000#137^{[A]}
29146 McHone	March 17, 1988	List of minor planets: 29001–30000#146^{[A]}
29292 Conniewalker	May 24, 1993	List of minor planets: 29001–30000#292^{[D]}
30767 Chriskraft	November 6, 1983	List of minor planets: 30001–31000#767^{[A]}
30779 Sankt-Stephan	October 17, 1987	List of minor planets: 30001–31000#779^{[A]}
30785 Greeley	August 13, 1988	List of minor planets: 30001–31000#785^{[A]}
30786 Karkoschka	August 18, 1988	List of minor planets: 30001–31000#786^{[A]}
30840 Jackalice	April 15, 1991	List of minor planets: 30001–31000#840^{[D]}
30844 Hukeller	May 17, 1991	List of minor planets: 30001–31000#844^{[A]}
30934 Bakerhansen	November 16, 1993	List of minor planets: 30001–31000#934^{[D]}
30935 Davasobel	January 8, 1994	List of minor planets: 30001–31000#935^{[D]}
32776 Nriag	May 29, 1987	List of minor planets: 32001–33000#776^{[A]}
32890 Schwob	January 8, 1994	List of minor planets: 32001–33000#890^{[D]}
32897 Curtharris	August 1, 1994	List of minor planets: 32001–33000#897^{[D]}
35056 Cullers	September 28, 1984	List of minor planets: 35001–36000#056^{[A]}
37588 Lynnecox	April 15, 1991	List of minor planets: 37001–38000#588^{[D]}
37601 Vicjen	April 3, 1992	List of minor planets: 37001–38000#601^{[D]}
37609 LaVelle	November 25, 1992	List of minor planets: 37001–38000#609^{[A]}
37655 Illapa	August 1, 1994	List of minor planets: 37001–38000#655^{[A]}
43763 Russert	May 30, 1987	List of minor planets: 43001–44000#763^{[A]}
43793 Mackey	November 13, 1990	List of minor planets: 43001–44000#793^{[D]}
48416 Carmelita	January 24, 1988	List of minor planets: 48001–49000#416^{[A]}
(48576) 1994 NN_{2}	July 11, 1994	List of minor planets: 48001–49000#576
52266 Van Flandern	January 10, 1986	List of minor planets: 52001–53000#266^{[A]}
52384 Elenapanko	April 19, 1993	List of minor planets: 52001–53000#384
(55758) 1991 XR	December 3, 1991	List of minor planets: 55001–56000#758
65672 Merrick	August 16, 1988	List of minor planets: 65001–66000#672^{[A]}
(65688) 1990 VD_{8}	November 13, 1990	List of minor planets: 65001–66000#688
73670 Kurthopf	August 19, 1982	List of minor planets: 73001–74000#670^{[A]}
79117 Brydonejack	August 16, 1988	List of minor planets: 79001–80000#117^{[A]}
85158 Phyllistrapp	October 17, 1987	List of minor planets: 85001–86000#158
(85165) 1988 TV_{2}	October 7, 1988	List of minor planets: 85001–86000#165
(85194) 1991 TL_{2}	October 5, 1991	List of minor planets: 85001–86000#194
(85306) 1994 VL_{8}	November 7, 1994	List of minor planets: 85001–86000#306
(90777) 1993 XJ_{3}	December 10, 1993	List of minor planets: 90001–91000#777
(99907) 1989 VA	November 2, 1989	List of minor planets: 99001–100000#907
(100008) 1988 QZ	August 16, 1988	List of minor planets: 100001–101000#008
(100015) 1989 SR_{7}	September 28, 1989	List of minor planets: 100001–101000#015
(100016) 1989 SD_{8}	September 28, 1989	List of minor planets: 100001–101000#016
(100045) 1991 TK_{1}	October 5, 1991	List of minor planets: 100001–101000#045
(100052) 1991 VP_{5}	November 7, 1991	List of minor planets: 100001–101000#052
(100085) 1992 UY_{4}	October 25, 1992	List of minor planets: 100001–101000#085
(129451) 1991 KD	May 18, 1991	List of minor planets: 129001–130000#451
(316650) 1987 UL	October 17, 1987	List of minor planets: 316001–317000#650
(363012) 1988 PH_{4}	August 14, 1988	List of minor planets: 363001–364000#012
(368150) 1992 DC	February 26, 1992	List of minor planets: 368001–369000#150
(393348) 1988 RO_{1}	September 13, 1988	List of minor planets: 393001–394000#348
(408751) 1987 SF_{3}	September 26, 1987	List of minor planets: 408001–409000#751^{[A]}
(422637) 1985 WA	November 16, 1985	List of minor planets: 422001–423000#637
(488450) 1994 JX	May 14, 1994	List of minor planets: 488001–489000#450
Co-discovery with: ^{A} Eugene M. Shoemaker; ^{B} Schelte J. Bus; ^{C} Michael C. Nolan; ^{D} David H. Levy; ^{E} Henry E. Holt
