= 2906 Caltech =

Asteroid from the outer region of the asteroid belt

Discovery
- Discovered by: C. Shoemaker
- Discovery site: Palomar Obs.
- Discovery date: 13 January 1983

Designations
- Named after: Caltech (owner of Palomar Obs.)
- Alternative designations: 1983 AE_{2} · 1957 KJ; 1957 MA · 1974 LC; 1976 YS_{2} · 1983 CD
- Minor planet category: main-belt · (outer)

Orbital characteristics
- Epoch 4 September 2017 (JD 2458000.5)
- Uncertainty parameter 0
- Observation arc: 60.01 yr (21,920 days)
- Aphelion: 3.5070 AU
- Perihelion: 2.8262 AU
- Semi-major axis: 3.1666 AU
- Eccentricity: 0.1075
- Orbital period (sidereal): 5.64 yr (2,058 days)
- Mean anomaly: 144.97°
- Mean motion: 0° 10^{m} 29.64^{s} / day
- Inclination: 30.646°
- Longitude of ascending node: 84.493°
- Argument of perihelion: 295.36°

Physical characteristics
- Dimensions: 50.83±15.31 km 52.49±13.11 km 57.88 km (derived); 57.98±2.3 km 58.678±0.659 km 61.07±0.72 km
- Synodic rotation period: 12.99±0.05 h 12.9937±0.0005 h 12.999±0.0169 h
- Geometric albedo: 0.0438 (derived); 0.048±0.001; 0.051±0.012; 0.0526±0.004; 0.06±0.04
- Spectral type: SMASS = Xc · C
- Absolute magnitude (H): 9.96±0.59 · 10.0 · 10.035±0.002 (R) · 10.10 · 10.2 · 10.33

2906 Caltech, provisional designation 1983 AE_{2}, is an asteroid from the outer region of the asteroid belt, approximately 56 kilometers in diameter. It was discovered on 13 January 1983 by American astronomer Carolyn Shoemaker at Palomar Observatory in the United States. It is named after the California Institute of Technology.

== Orbit and classification ==
Caltech orbits the Sun in the outer main-belt at a distance of 2.8–3.5 AU once every 5 years and 8 months (2,058 days). Its orbit has an eccentricity of 0.11 and an inclination of 31° with respect to the ecliptic. It was first identified as 1957 KJ at Goethe Link Observatory in 1957, extending the body's observation arc by 26 years prior to its official discovery at Palomar.

== Physical characteristics ==
In the SMASS taxonomy, Caltech is a Xc-type asteroid, which transitions between the core X and carbonaceous C types.

=== Rotation period ===
Between 2006 and 2012, a total of 3 rotational lightcurves of Caltech were obtained from photometric observations by Italian amateur astronomers Silvano Casulli and Federico Manzini as well as at the Palomar Transient Factory in California. Lightcurve analysis gave a concurring rotation period of 12.99 hours with a brightness variation between 0.16 and 0.27 magnitude (U=2-/2/2).

=== Diameter and albedo ===
According to the surveys carried out by the Infrared Astronomical Satellite IRAS, the Japanese Akari satellite, and NASA's Wide-field Infrared Survey Explorer with its subsequent NEOWISE mission, Caltech measures between 50.83 and 61.07 kilometers in diameter, and its surface has an albedo between 0.048 and 0.06. The Collaborative Asteroid Lightcurve Link derives an albedo of 0.0438 and a diameter of 57.88 kilometers using an absolute magnitude of 12.2.

== Naming ==
This minor planet is named after the California Institute of Technology, Caltech, which is the owner and operator of the discovering Palomar Observatory. The discovery was made with the 0.46-m Schmidt telescope, the first telescope installed on Palomar. The official naming citation was published by the Minor Planet Center on 22 September 1983 (M.P.C. 8154).
