= 11066 Sigurd =

Near-Earth asteroid

Discovery
- Discovered by: C. Shoemaker; E. Shoemaker
- Discovery site: Palomar Obs.
- Discovery date: 9 February 1992

Designations
- Named after: Sigurd (Norse mythology)
- Alternative designations: 1992 CC_{1}; 1987 GE
- Minor planet category: NEO; Apollo

Orbital characteristics
- Epoch 4 September 2017 (JD 2458000.5)
- Uncertainty parameter 0
- Observation arc: 41.22 yr (15,057 days)
- Aphelion: 1.9138 AU
- Perihelion: 0.8691 AU
- Semi-major axis: 1.3915 AU
- Eccentricity: 0.3754
- Orbital period (sidereal): 1.64 yr (600 days)
- Mean anomaly: 314.05°
- Mean motion: 0° 36^{m} 1.8^{s} / day
- Inclination: 36.883°
- Longitude of ascending node: 349.25°
- Argument of perihelion: 22.006°
- Earth MOID: 0.1183 AU (46.1 LD)

Physical characteristics
- Dimensions: 2.10±0.09 km; 2.778±0.115 km; 2.86 km (calculated)
- Synodic rotation period: 8.4958 h; 8.496 h; 8.51±0.01 h
- Geometric albedo: 0.18 (assumed); 0.190±0.033; 0.29±0.04; 0.38±0.31
- Spectral type: SMASS = K; Sr; S; K
- Absolute magnitude (H): 15.00; 15.2; 15.36; 15.51±0.31

11066 Sigurd (provisional designation 1992 CC_{1}) is a stony contact binary asteroid classified as a near-Earth object of the Apollo group of asteroids, approximately 2.5 kilometers in diameter.

It was discovered on 9 February 1992 by American astronomer couple Carolyn and Eugene Shoemaker at Palomar Observatory, California, and named after Sigurd, a hero from Norse mythology.

== Orbit and classification ==
Sigurd orbits the Sun in the inner main-belt at a distance of 0.9–1.9 AU once every 1 years and 8 months (600 days). Its orbit has an eccentricity of 0.38 and an inclination of 37° with respect to the ecliptic. A first precovery was taken at the Australian Siding Spring Observatory in 1978, and it was identified as 1987 GE at Palomar in 1987. Both observations remained unused. The body's observation arc begins with its official discovery observation at Palomar in 1992.

It has an Earth minimum orbital intersection distance of 0.1183 AU (17,700,000 km), which corresponds to 46.1 lunar distances.

== Physical characteristics ==
In the SMASS taxonomy, Sigurd is a relatively rare K-type asteroid, which fall into the broader stony S-complex. It has also been grouped into the common S-type asteroid. The ExploreNEOs Warm Spitzer program, using the NASA Infrared Telescope Facility on Mauna Kea Observatory in Hawaii, classifies Sigurd as a Sr-type, which transitions to the R-type asteroids.

=== Contact binary ===
Radiometric observations at Arecibo Observatory revealed that Sigurd is a contact binary, composed of two lobes in contact with each other. The more or less ellipsoidal lobes are elongated and joined on their long axis. The body has an axial tilt of 50° to 130°. The observing astronomers also note, that more than 10% of all larger (> 200 meters) near-Earth objects observed by radar are such contact binaries.

=== Photometry ===
Rotational lightcurves obtained from photometric observations by Petr Pravec, Brian Warner and by a group of German and Ukrainian astronomers, gave a well-defined rotation period of 8.4958 to 8.51 hours. The analysis of the constructed lightcurves also gave a high brightness amplitude between 0.97 and 1.15 magnitude, which is indicative that Sigurd has a non-spheroidal shape (U=3/3/3).

== Diameter and albedo ==
According to the survey carried out by NASA's Wide-field Infrared Survey Explorer with its subsequent NEOWISE mission, Sigurd measures between 2.10 and 2.778 kilometers in diameter and its surface has an albedo of 0.190 and 0.29, respectively. Observations by the ExploreNEOs survey give a higher albedo of 0.38. The Collaborative Asteroid Lightcurve Link assumes an albedo of 0.18 and calculates a diameter of 2.86 kilometers with an absolute magnitude of 15.2, while radiometric observations of Sigurd gave a maximum dimensions of 4.2 kilometers.

== Naming ==
This minor planet was named after Sigurd, a legendary hero in Norse mythology. In the Völsunga saga, Sigurd rides through a ring of fire to awaken the shieldmaiden Brynhild (123 Brunhild), and later dies in a fight with Odin (3989 Odin). Sigurd is also known as the dragon-slayer Siegfried in the German poem The Song of the Nibelungs. The approved naming citation was published by the Minor Planet Center on 23 May 2000 (M.P.C. 40706).
