= 3873 Roddy =

Stony Hungarian asteroid, Mars-crosser and suspected binary system

Discovery
- Discovered by: C. Shoemaker
- Discovery site: Palomar Obs.
- Discovery date: 21 November 1984

Designations
- Named after: David Roddy (American astrogeologist)
- Alternative designations: 1984 WB · 1953 XK_{1}
- Minor planet category: Mars-crosser; Hungaria

Orbital characteristics
- Epoch 4 September 2017 (JD 2458000.5)
- Uncertainty parameter 0
- Observation arc: 32.46 yr (11,855 days)
- Aphelion: 2.1452 AU
- Perihelion: 1.6387 AU
- Semi-major axis: 1.8920 AU
- Eccentricity: 0.1339
- Orbital period (sidereal): 2.60 yr (951 days)
- Mean anomaly: 140.78°
- Mean motion: 0° 22^{m} 43.32^{s} / day
- Inclination: 23.357°
- Longitude of ascending node: 250.06°
- Argument of perihelion: 267.60°
- Known satellites: 1 (likely)

Physical characteristics
- Dimensions: 5.021±0.581; 7.13 km (calculated); 7.51±0.25 km
- Synodic rotation period: 2.4782±0.09 h 2.479±0.001 h 2.4792±0.0001 h 2.4797±0.00006 h 2.480±0.001 h 2.486±0.001 h
- Geometric albedo: 0.20 (assumed); 0.419±0.164; 0.512±0.039
- Spectral type: SMASS = S · S · L
- Absolute magnitude (H): 12.00 · 12.8 · 13.1

3873 Roddy, provisional designation 1984 WB, is a stony Hungarian asteroid, Mars-crosser and suspected binary system, from the innermost regions of the asteroid belt, approximately 7 kilometers in diameter. It was discovered on 21 November 1984, by American astronomer Carolyn Shoemaker at the Palomar Observatory in California, United States. It was named after American astrogeologist David Roddy.

== Orbit and classification ==
Roddy is a member of the Hungaria family, which form the innermost dense concentration of asteroids in the Solar System. It orbits the Sun at a distance of 1.6–2.1 AU once every 2 years and 7 months (951 days). Its orbit has an eccentricity of 0.13 and an inclination of 23° with respect to the ecliptic. The first precovery was taken at the discovering observatory in 1953, extending the asteroid's observation arc by 31 years prior to its discovery.

== Physical characteristics ==
In the SMASS classification, Roddy is a common S-type asteroid. It has also been characterized as a rare L-type asteroid.

== Diameter and albedo ==
According to the surveys carried out by NASA's NEOWISE mission and the Japanese Akari satellite, the asteroid measures 5.0 and 7.5 kilometers, and its surface has an exceptionally high albedo of 0.419 and 0.512, respectively, while the Collaborative Asteroid Lightcurve Link assumes a standard albedo for stony asteroids of 0.20 and calculates a diameter of 7.1 kilometers with an absolute magnitude of 13.1.

== Moon and lightcurve ==
A large number of photometric observations by American astronomer Brian Warner at the Palmer Divide Observatory (716) in Colorado, were made to measure the asteroid's lightcurve. One of the best results rendered a period of 2.4782 hours and a variation in brightness of 0.05 in magnitude (U=3). Other lightcurve observations gave a similar period between 2.478 and 2.486 hours.

While there is strong evidence for an asteroid moon orbiting Roddy, its existence is still uncertain as of 2016. Based on one observation/solution, the satellite has an orbital period of 19.24±0.02 hours and measures about 27% of Roddy's diameter, which is slightly less than 2 kilometers (D_{s}/D_{p} ratio of 0.27±0.02). However, an alternative orbital period of 23.8 hours is also possible.

== Naming ==
This minor planet was named in after David J. Roddy (1932–2002), an American astrogeologist and authority on terrestrial impact craters at the U.S. Geological Survey. He is noted for his mathematical models of impact events and his studies on Devonian impact craters, as well as for using explosives for his field experiments. The approved naming citation was published by the Minor Planet Center on 12 December 1989 (M.P.C. 15574).
