= 24626 Astrowizard =

Main-belt asteroid

Discovery
- Discovered by: C. S. Shoemaker; E. M. Shoemaker
- Discovery site: Palomar Obs.
- Discovery date: 9 October 1980

Designations
- Named after: David V. Rodrigues (astronomy communicator)
- Alternative designations: 1980 TS_{3} · 1998 ML_{13} 2000 AA_{181}
- Minor planet category: main-belt · (middle) background

Orbital characteristics
- Epoch 4 September 2017 (JD 2458000.5)
- Uncertainty parameter 0
- Observation arc: 37.22 yr (13,594 days)
- Aphelion: 3.5616 AU
- Perihelion: 1.9814 AU
- Semi-major axis: 2.7715 AU
- Eccentricity: 0.2851
- Orbital period (sidereal): 4.61 yr (1,685 days)
- Mean anomaly: 349.96°
- Mean motion: 0° 12^{m} 48.96^{s} / day
- Inclination: 8.2050°
- Longitude of ascending node: 183.08°
- Argument of perihelion: 203.27°

Physical characteristics
- Mean diameter: 6.528±0.594 km
- Geometric albedo: 0.072±0.011
- Absolute magnitude (H): 14.2

24626 Astrowizard (provisional designation 1980 TS_{3}) is a dark background asteroid from the central regions of the asteroid belt, approximately 7 kilometers in diameter. It was discovered on 9 October 1980, by American astronomer couple Carolyn and Eugene Shoemaker at the Palomar Observatory in California, United States. The asteroid was named for American science educator David Rodrigues, who would perform at public events as "The Astro Wizard".

== Orbit and classification ==
Astrowizard is a non-family from the main belt's background population. It orbits the Sun in the central asteroid belt at a distance of 2.0–3.6 AU once every 4 years and 7 months (1,685 days; semi-major axis of 2.77 AU). Its orbit has an eccentricity of 0.29 and an inclination of 8° with respect to the ecliptic. The body's observation arc begins at the discovering observatory just two nights prior to its official discovery observation.

== Physical characteristics ==
Based on its geometric albedo of 0.072, Astrowizard is possibly a carbonaceous C-type asteroid.

=== Rotation period ===
As of 2018, no rotational lightcurve of Astrowizard has been obtained from photometric observations. The body's rotation period, pole and shape remain unknown.

=== Diameter and albedo ===
According to the survey carried out by the NEOWISE mission of NASA's Wide-field Infrared Survey Explorer, Astrowizard measures 6.528 kilometers in diameter and its surface has an albedo of 0.072.

== Naming ==
This minor planet was named by the discoverers after David V. Rodrigues (born 1952), an American astronomical lecturer at the Morrison Planetarium at the California Academy of Sciences in San Francisco. He is known for his educational outreach on astronomy to the public and school children, wearing a wizard costume.

The official naming citation was published by the Minor Planet Center on 1 May 2003 (M.P.C. 48396).
