= 4332 Milton =

Background asteroid

Discovery
- Discovered by: C. Shoemaker
- Discovery site: Palomar Obs.
- Discovery date: 5 September 1983

Designations
- Named after: Daniel J. Milton (American astrogeologist)
- Alternative designations: 1983 RC · 1933 SH_{1} 1989 ET_{4}
- Minor planet category: main-belt · (middle) background

Orbital characteristics
- Epoch 23 March 2018 (JD 2458200.5)
- Uncertainty parameter 0
- Observation arc: 84.44 yr (30,841 d)
- Aphelion: 3.3990 AU
- Perihelion: 1.7701 AU
- Semi-major axis: 2.5846 AU
- Eccentricity: 0.3151
- Orbital period (sidereal): 4.16 yr (1,518 d)
- Mean anomaly: 107.91°
- Mean motion: 0° 14^{m} 13.92^{s} / day
- Inclination: 19.169°
- Longitude of ascending node: 166.00°
- Argument of perihelion: 198.38°

Physical characteristics
- Mean diameter: 11.26 km (derived); 11.500±3.014 km 11.54±0.6 km
- Synodic rotation period: 3.295±0.005 h 3.2978±0.0003 h
- Geometric albedo: 0.1002±0.0708; 0.1158 (derived); 0.2306±0.028
- Spectral type: SMASS = Xe · C
- Absolute magnitude (H): 11.9; 12.7; 12.73; 12.8

4332 Milton, provisional designation 1983 RC, is a background asteroid from the central regions of the asteroid belt, approximately 11 kilometers (7 miles) in diameter. It was discovered on 5 September 1983, by American astronomer Carolyn Shoemaker at the Palomar Observatory in California. The X e-subtype has a rotation period of 3.3 hours. It was named after Daniel Milton, American geologist with the USGS.

== Orbit and classification ==
Milton is a non-family asteroid from the main belt's background population. It orbits the Sun in the central asteroid belt at a distance of 1.8–3.4 AU once every 4 years and 2 months (1,518 days; semi-major axis of 2.58 AU). Its orbit has an eccentricity of 0.32 and an inclination of 19° with respect to the ecliptic.

The asteroid was first observed as 1933 SH_{1} at Heidelberg Observatory in September 1933. The body's observation arc begins with its official discovery observation at Palomar in September 1983.

== Physical characteristics ==
In the SMASS classification, Milton is a Xe-subtype that transitions between the X-type and E-type asteroids. It has also been characterized as a carbonaceous C-type by Pan-STARRS' large-scale survey.

=== Rotation period ===
In September 2008, a rotational lightcurve of Milton was obtained from photometric observations by Julian Oey at the Kingsgrove (E19) and Leura (E17) observatories. Lightcurve analysis gave a rotation period of 3.2978 hours with a brightness variation of 0.30 magnitude (U=2+). In August 2012, a refined period of 3.295 hours and an amplitude of 0.16 magnitude was measured by Afşar Kabaş at the Çanakkale University Observatory in Turkey (U=3-).

=== Diameter and albedo ===
According to the surveys carried out by the Infrared Astronomical Satellite IRAS and the NEOWISE mission of NASA's Wide-field Infrared Survey Explorer, Milton measures between 11.500 and 11.54 kilometers in diameter and its surface has an albedo between 0.1002 and 0.2306.

The Collaborative Asteroid Lightcurve Link derives an albedo of 0.1158 and a diameter of 11.26 kilometers based on an absolute magnitude of 12.7.

Only one brief stellar occultation by 4332 Milton has been observed to date, in 2021.

== Naming ==
This minor planet was named after Daniel J. Milton (1934–2024), American geologist with the United States Geological Survey, known for his geological studies of the Moon and Mars, as well as for research on impact craters and features in Australia. The official naming citation was published by the Minor Planet Center on 30 January 1991 (M.P.C. 17656).
