= 5175 Ables =

Hungaria asteroid

Discovery
- Discovered by: C. S. Shoemaker; E. M. Shoemaker
- Discovery site: Palomar Obs.
- Discovery date: 4 November 1988

Designations
- Named after: Harold Ables (American astronomer)
- Alternative designations: 1988 VS_{4} · 1990 KH
- Minor planet category: main-belt · Hungaria

Orbital characteristics
- Epoch 4 September 2017 (JD 2458000.5)
- Uncertainty parameter 0
- Observation arc: 62.95 yr (22,993 days)
- Aphelion: 2.0438 AU
- Perihelion: 1.8908 AU
- Semi-major axis: 1.9673 AU
- Eccentricity: 0.0389
- Orbital period (sidereal): 2.76 yr (1,008 days)
- Mean anomaly: 9.7153°
- Mean motion: 0° 21^{m} 25.92^{s} / day
- Inclination: 16.847°
- Longitude of ascending node: 234.51°
- Argument of perihelion: 313.87°

Physical characteristics
- Dimensions: 4.29±0.23 km 5.31 km (calculated); 5.697±0.024 km
- Synodic rotation period: 2.7976±0.0005 h 2.798±0.001 h
- Geometric albedo: 0.2897±0.0604; 0.30 (assumed); 0.505±0.074
- Spectral type: E
- Absolute magnitude (H): 13.3 · 13.2 · 13.83±0.37

5175 Ables (provisional designation 1988 VS_{4}) is a bright Hungaria asteroid from the inner regions of the asteroid belt, approximately 5 kilometers in diameter. It was discovered by American astronomers Carolyn and Eugene Shoemaker at the U.S. Palomar Observatory, California, on 4 November 1988. It was named after American astronomer Harold Ables.

== Orbit and classification ==
Ables is a member of the Hungaria family, which form the innermost dense concentration of asteroids in the Solar System.

It orbits the Sun at a distance of 1.9–2.0 AU once every 2 years and 9 months (1,008 days). Its orbit has an eccentricity of 0.04 and an inclination of 17° with respect to the ecliptic. A first precovery was obtained at Palomar Observatory in 1954, extending the asteroid's observation arc by 34 years prior to its official discovery observation.

== Physical characteristics ==
Ables has been characterized as a bright E-type asteroid.

=== Diameter and albedo ===
Based on the surveys carried out by the NASA's space-based Wide-field Infrared Survey Explorer and its subsequent NEOWISE mission, Ables has an albedo of 0.29 and 0.51, with a corresponding diameter of 5.7 and 4.3 kilometers, respectively, while the Collaborative Asteroid Lightcurve Link assumes an albedo of 0.30 and calculates a diameter of 5.3 kilometers with an absolute magnitude of 13.3.

=== Lightcurves ===
Between 2010 and 2014, three rotational lightcurves of Ables have been obtained by American astronomer Brian Warner at the Palmer Divide Station (714) in Colorado. The best result gave a short rotation period of 2.798 hours with a brightness variation of 0.10 magnitude (U=3).

== Naming ==
This minor planet was named after American astronomer Harold D. Ables (born 1938). While director at the United States Naval Observatory Flagstaff Station (NOFS), he was responsible for the station's transition from photographic plates to CCD imaging. The body's name was suggested by the JPL Ephemeris Group and subsequently proposed by the discoverers. The approved naming citation was published by the Minor Planet Center on 1 July 1996 (M.P.C. 27459).
