= 6239 Minos =

Bright sub-kilometer near-Earth object

Discovery
- Discovered by: C. Shoemaker; E. Shoemaker
- Discovery site: Palomar Obs.
- Discovery date: 31 August 1989

Designations
- Pronunciation: /ˈmaɪnɒs, -əs/
- Named after: Minos
- Alternative designations: 1989 QF
- Minor planet category: PHA

Orbital characteristics
- Epoch 13 January 2016 (JD 2457400.5)
- Uncertainty parameter 0
- Observation arc: 12039 days (32.96 yr)
- Aphelion: 1.6268 AU (243.37 Gm)
- Perihelion: 0.67620 AU (101.158 Gm)
- Semi-major axis: 1.1515 AU (172.26 Gm)
- Eccentricity: 0.41276
- Orbital period (sidereal): 1.24 yr (451.32 d)
- Mean anomaly: 191.37°
- Mean motion: 0° 47^{m} 51.576^{s} / day
- Inclination: 3.9450°
- Longitude of ascending node: 344.618°
- Argument of perihelion: 239.663°
- Earth MOID: 0.0261927 AU (10 LD)

Physical characteristics
- Mean diameter: 474 m
- Synodic rotation period: 3.5558 h
- Geometric albedo: 0.57
- Absolute magnitude (H): 18.5

6239 Minos (prov. designation: 1989 QF) is a bright sub-kilometer near-Earth object, classified as a potentially hazardous asteroid of the Apollo group. It was discovered on 31 August 1989, by American astronomer couple Carolyn and Eugene Shoemaker at the Palomar Observatory in California. The asteroid has a rotation period of 3.6 hours and measures approximately 0.5 kilometers (0.3 miles) in diameter. It makes frequent close approaches to Mars, Earth, and Venus.
