= 4451 Grieve =

Mars-crossing asteroid

Discovery
- Discovered by: C. Shoemaker
- Discovery site: Palomar Obs.
- Discovery date: 9 May 1988

Designations
- Named after: Richard Grieve (Canadian geologist)
- Alternative designations: 1988 JJ · 1971 GF; 1980 VE_{1}
- Minor planet category: Mars-crosser

Orbital characteristics
- Epoch 23 March 2018 (JD 2458200.5)
- Uncertainty parameter 0
- Observation arc: 63.12 yr (23,053 d)
- Aphelion: 3.6024 AU
- Perihelion: 1.6064 AU
- Semi-major axis: 2.6044 AU
- Eccentricity: 0.3832
- Orbital period (sidereal): 4.20 yr (1,535 d)
- Mean anomaly: 348.28°
- Mean motion: 0° 14^{m} 4.2^{s} / day
- Inclination: 27.799°
- Longitude of ascending node: 219.38°
- Argument of perihelion: 110.23°
- Mars MOID: 0.4477 AU

Physical characteristics
- Mean diameter: 12.16±2.43 km
- Synodic rotation period: 6.864±0.006 h
- Geometric albedo: 0.189
- Spectral type: SMASS = S Svw (Bus–DeMeo)
- Absolute magnitude (H): 12.00

4451 Grieve, provisional designation 1988 JJ, is a stony asteroid and large Mars-crosser on an eccentric orbit from the central asteroid belt, approximately 12 kilometers (7.5 miles) in diameter. It was discovered on 9 May 1988, by American astronomer Carolyn Shoemaker at the Palomar Observatory in California. The S-type asteroid is likely elongated and has a rotation period of 6.9 hours. It was named for Canadian geologist Richard Grieve.

== Orbit and classification ==
Grieve is a Mars-crossing asteroid, crossing the orbit of Mars at 1.666 AU. Members of this dynamically unstable group are located between the main belt and near-Earth populations. It orbits the Sun at a distance of 1.6–3.6 AU once every 4 years and 2 months (1,535 days; semi-major axis of 2.6 AU). Its orbit has an eccentricity of 0.38 and an inclination of 28° with respect to the ecliptic. The body's observation arc begins with a precovery taken at Palomar in 1954, or 34 years prior to its official discovery observation.

== Physical characteristics ==
In the SMASS classification, Grieve is a common, stony S-type asteroid. In the Bus-DeMeo taxonomy it is a Svw-type.

== Naming ==
This minor planet was named after Canadian geologist Richard Grieve, chief of geophysics with the Geological Survey of Canada. He is a leading investigator of terrestrial and lunar impact craters and maintains the global census of recognized impact structures on Earth. Grieve has led the effort to reliably determine the ages for these structures and has classified impacts in molten rocks based on the abundance and distribution of siderophile elements. The official naming citation was published by the Minor Planet Center on 30 January 1991 (M.P.C. 17657).

=== Rotation period ===
In October 2001, a rotational lightcurve of Grieve was obtained from photometric observations by American astronomer Edwin E. Sheridan at the Crescent Butte Observatory (682) in Utah. Lightcurve analysis gave a rotation period of 6.864±0.006 hours with a brightness amplitude of 0.90 magnitude (U=3). Alternative observations by Robert Stephens (6.85 h) and Pierre Antonini (6.8607 h) were very similar (U=3/3).
6.8607±0.0002 h The lightcurve's high brightness variation is indicative of an elongated shape.

=== Diameter and albedo ===
According to the survey carried out by the NEOWISE mission of NASA's Wide-field Infrared Survey Explorer, Grieve measures 12.16 kilometers in diameter and its surface has an albedo of 0.189. The Collaborative Asteroid Lightcurve Link assumes an albedo of 0.20 and calculates a diameter of 11.83 kilometers based on an absolute magnitude of 12.0.

This makes Grieve one of the largest Mars-crossing asteroids (MCAs) comparable with 1310 Villigera (13.76 km), as most mid-sized MCA's measure below 10 kilometers such as 1139 Atami (9.35 km), 1474 Beira (14.9 km), 1011 Laodamia (7.5 km), 1727 Mette (5.44 km), 1131 Porzia (7 km), 1235 Schorria (5.55 km), 985 Rosina (8.18 km) and 1468 Zomba (7 km). However, largest members of this dynamical group, namely, 132 Aethra, 1508 Kemi, 2204 Lyyli and 512 Taurinensis are all larger than 20 kilometers in diameter.
