= Amor asteroid =

Group of near-Earth asteroids

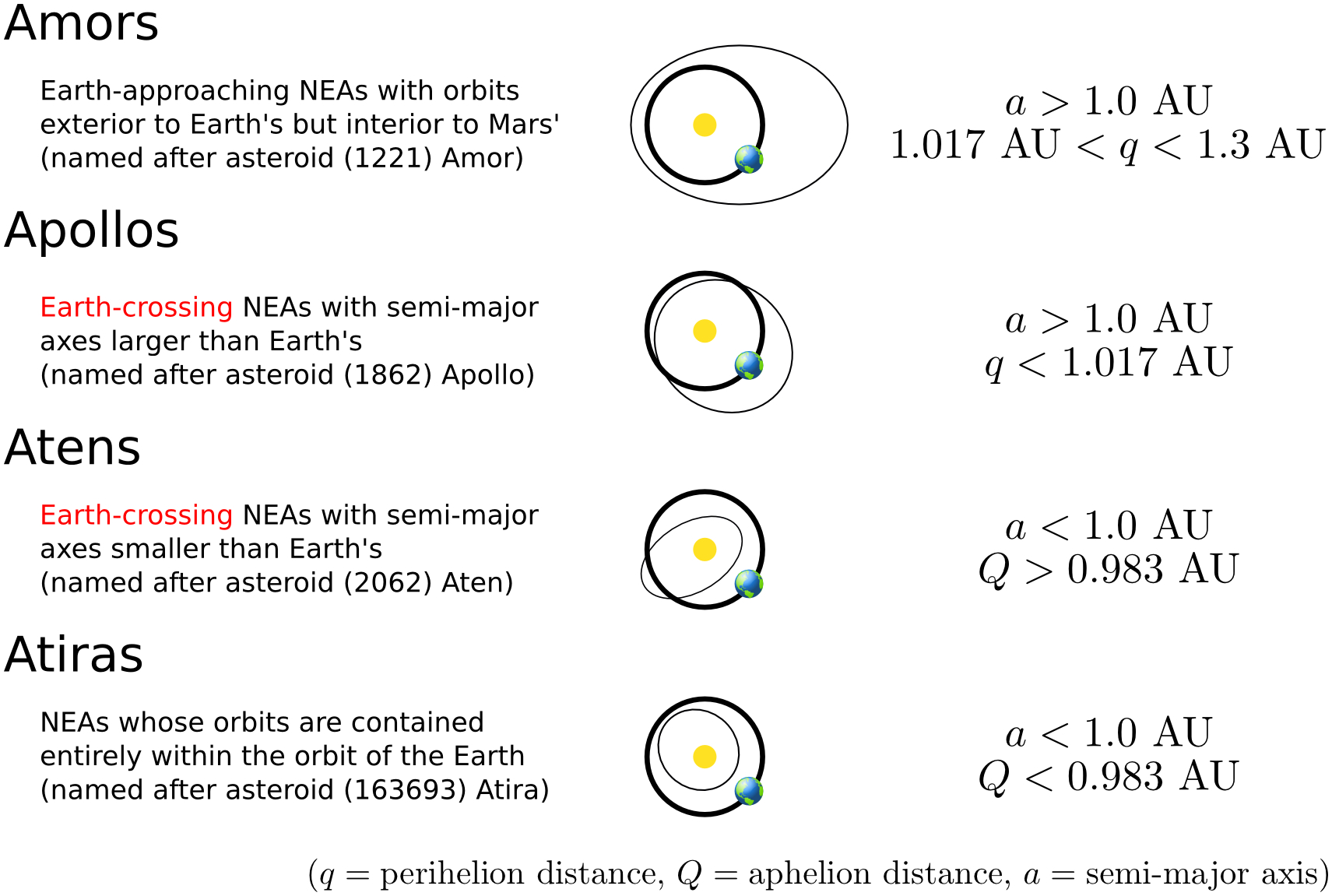
Common orbital subgroups of Near-Earth Objects (NEOs)

The Amor asteroids are a group of near-Earth asteroids named after the archetype object 1221 Amor /ˈeɪmɔːr/. The orbital perihelion of these objects is close to, but greater than, the orbital aphelion of Earth (i.e., the objects do not cross Earth's orbit), with most Amors crossing the orbit of Mars. The Amor asteroid 433 Eros was the first asteroid to be orbited and landed upon by a robotic space probe (NEAR Shoemaker).

== Definition ==
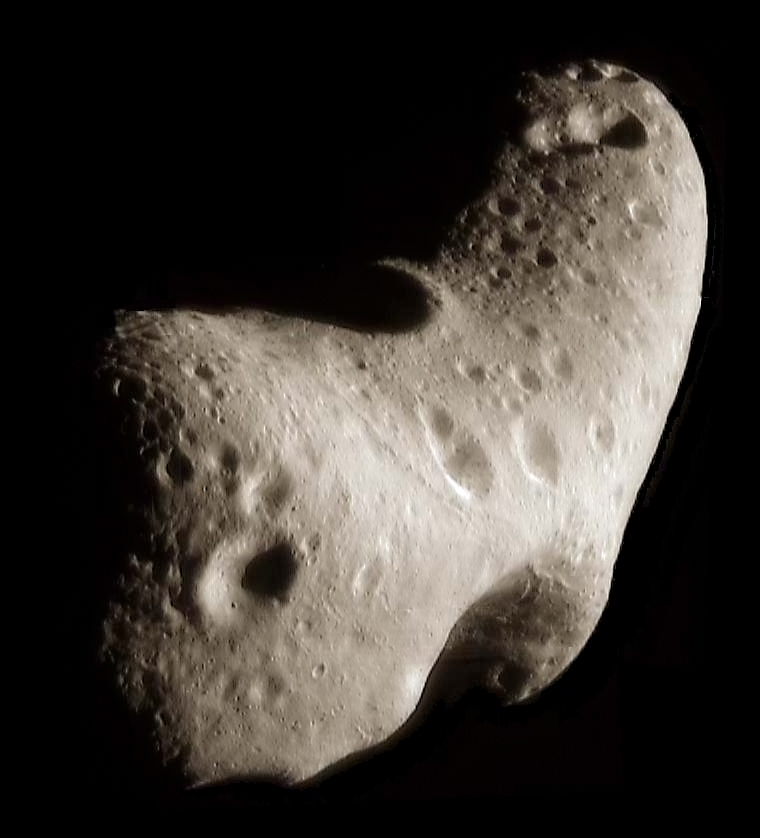
Amor asteroid Eros visited by NEAR Shoemaker in 2000

The orbital characteristics that define an asteroid as being in the Amor group are:

- The orbital period is greater than one year; i.e., the orbital semi-major axis (a) is greater than 1.0 AU (a > 1.0 AU);
- The orbit does not cross that of Earth; i.e., the orbital perihelion (q) is greater than Earth's orbital aphelion (q > 1.017 AU);
- The object is a near-Earth object (NEO); i.e., q < 1.3 AU.

== Populations ==
As of January 2025 there are 15,175 known Amor asteroids. Of those objects, 1414 are numbered, 83 are named, and 42 are designated as a potentially hazardous asteroid.

=== Outer Earth-grazer asteroids ===
An outer Earth-grazer asteroid is an asteroid that is normally beyond Earth's orbit, but which can get closer to the Sun than Earth's aphelion (1.0167 AU), and not closer than Earth's perihelion (0.9833 AU); i.e., the asteroid's perihelion is between Earth's perihelion and aphelion. Outer Earth-grazer asteroids are split between Amor and Apollo asteroids. Using the definition of Amor asteroids above, "Earth grazers" that never get closer to the Sun than Earth does (at any point along its orbit) are Amors, whereas those that do are Apollos.

=== Potentially hazardous asteroids ===
To be considered a potentially hazardous asteroid (PHA), an object's orbit must, at some point, come within 0.05 AU of Earth's orbit, and the object itself must be sufficiently large/massive to cause significant regional damage if it impacted Earth. Most PHAs are either Aten asteroids or Apollo asteroids (and thus have orbits that cross the orbit of Earth), and as of November 2023 70 Amors are classified as a PHA, the named objects 2061 Anza, 3122 Florence, 3908 Nyx, and 3671 Dionysus.

== Lists ==
=== Prominent Amor asteroids ===
Name	Year	Discoverer	Refs
3908 Nyx	1980	Hans-Emil Schuster	MPC · JPL
1221 Amor	1932	Eugène Delporte	MPC · JPL
1036 Ganymed	1924	Walter Baade	MPC · JPL
887 Alinda	1918	Max Wolf	MPC · JPL ·
719 Albert	1911	Johann Palisa	MPC · JPL
433 Eros	1898	Gustav Witt	MPC · JPL

=== Named Amor asteroids ===
This is a non-static list of named Amor asteroids.

Designation	Prov. designation
433 Eros	1898 DQ
719 Albert	1911 MT
887 Alinda	1918 DB
1036 Ganymed	1924 TD
1221 Amor	1932 EA_{1}
1580 Betulia	1950 KA
1627 Ivar	1929 SH
1915 Quetzalcoatl	1953 EA
1916 Boreas	1953 RA
1917 Cuyo	1968 AA
1943 Anteros	1973 EC
1980 Tezcatlipoca	1950 LA
2059 Baboquivari	1963 UA
2061 Anza	1960 UA
2202 Pele	1972 RA
2368 Beltrovata	1977 RA
2608 Seneca	1978 DA
3102 Krok	1981 QA
3122 Florence	1981 ET_{3}
3199 Nefertiti	1982 RA
3271 Ul	1982 RB
3288 Seleucus	1982 DV
3352 McAuliffe	1981 CW
3551 Verenia	1983 RD
3552 Don Quixote	1983 SA

Designation	Prov. designation
3553 Mera	1985 JA
3671 Dionysus	1984 KD
3691 Bede	1982 FT
3757 Anagolay	1982 XB
3908 Nyx	1980 PA
3988 Huma	1986 LA
4055 Magellan	1985 DO_{2}
4401 Aditi	1985 TB
4487 Pocahontas	1987 UA
4503 Cleobulus	1989 WM
4947 Ninkasi	1988 TJ_{1}
4954 Eric	1990 SQ
4957 Brucemurray	1990 XJ
5324 Lyapunov	1987 SL
5332 Davidaguilar	1990 DA
5370 Taranis	1986 RA
5620 Jasonwheeler	1990 OA
5626 Melissabrucker	1991 FE
5653 Camarillo	1992 WD_{5}
5751 Zao	1992 AC
5797 Bivoj	1980 AA
5863 Tara	1983 RB
5869 Tanith	1988 VN_{4}
5879 Almeria	1992 CH_{1}
6050 Miwablock	1992 AE

Designation	Prov. designation
6456 Golombek	1992 OM
6569 Ondaatje	1993 MO
7088 Ishtar	1992 AA
7336 Saunders	1989 RS_{1}
7358 Oze	1995 YA_{3}
7480 Norwan	1994 PC
8013 Gordonmoore	1990 KA
8034 Akka	1992 LR
8709 Kadlu	1994 JF_{1}
9172 Abhramu	1989 OB
9950 ESA	1990 VB
11284 Belenus	1990 BA
13553 Masaakikoyama	1992 JE
15745 Yuliya	1991 PM_{5}
15817 Lucianotesi	1994 QC
16064 Davidharvey	1999 RH_{27}
16912 Rhiannon	1998 EP_{8}
18106 Blume	2000 NX_{3}
20460 Robwhiteley	1999 LO_{28}
21088 Chelyabinsk	1992 BL_{2}
52387 Huitzilopochtli	1993 OM_{7}
65803 Didymos	1996 GT
96189 Pygmalion	1991 NT_{3}
154991 Vinciguerra	2005 BX_{26}
162011 Konnohmaru	1994 AB_{1}

Designation	Prov. designation
164215 Doloreshill	2004 MF_{6}
189011 Ogmios	1997 NJ_{6}
280244 Ati	2002 WP_{11}
452307 Manawydan	1997 XV_{11}
481984 Cernunnos	2009 KL_{2}
520585 Saci	2014 OA_{2}
605911 Cecily	2016 XD_{1}
679829 Sucellos	2021 EC_{5}
785648 Likho	2015 RG_{36}

== See also ==
- List of Amor asteroid records
- Apollo asteroid
- Aten asteroid
- Atira asteroid
- Alinda asteroid
- Arjuna asteroid
- List of minor planets
