= 3553 Mera =

Main-belt asteroid

Discovery
- Discovered by: C. Shoemaker
- Discovery site: Palomar
- Discovery date: 14 May 1985

Designations
- Pronunciation: /ˈmɪərə/
- Alternative designations: MPO 270210

Orbital characteristics
- Epoch 13 January 2016 (JD 2457400.5)
- Uncertainty parameter 0
- Observation arc: 30.37 yr (11,094 d)
- Aphelion: 2.171 AU (324.8 Gm)
- Perihelion: 1.118 AU (167.3 Gm)
- Semi-major axis: 1.645 AU (246.1 Gm)
- Eccentricity: 0.320
- Orbital period (sidereal): 2.11 yr (770.34 d)
- Mean anomaly: 182.3°
- Mean motion: 0° 28^{m} 1.2^{s} / day
- Inclination: 36.77°
- Longitude of ascending node: 232.5°
- Argument of perihelion: 288.9°
- Earth MOID: 0.29 AU (43 Gm)

Physical characteristics
- Synodic rotation period: 3.1944 h (0.13310 d)
- Absolute magnitude (H): 16.4

3553 Mera, provisional designation 1985 JA, is an Amor asteroid discovered on May 14, 1985, by C. Shoemaker at Palomar. It was named for Maera, a daughter of Praetus.
