= 4401 Aditi =

Eccentric, stony asteroid

Discovery
- Discovered by: C. Shoemaker
- Discovery site: Palomar Obs.
- Discovery date: 14 October 1985

Designations
- Named after: Aditi (Hindu goddess)
- Alternative designations: 1985 TB
- Minor planet category: NEO; Amor

Orbital characteristics
- Epoch 4 September 2017 (JD 2458000.5)
- Uncertainty parameter 0
- Observation arc: 29.57 yr (10,800 days)
- Aphelion: 4.0367 AU
- Perihelion: 1.1228 AU
- Semi-major axis: 2.5797 AU
- Eccentricity: 0.5648
- Orbital period (sidereal): 4.14 yr (1,513 days)
- Mean anomaly: 235.58°
- Mean motion: 0° 14^{m} 16.44^{s} / day
- Inclination: 26.650°
- Longitude of ascending node: 22.902°
- Argument of perihelion: 68.144°
- Earth MOID: 0.3302 AU (128.6 LD)

Physical characteristics
- Dimensions: 1.801±0.535 km; 1.88 km (calculated)
- Synodic rotation period: 6.670±0.005 h; 6.6780±0.0005 h (Note: Benishek (2014) web: rotation period 19.2±0.5 hours with a brightness amplitude of 0.55 mag. No LCDB Quality Code available. Summary figures for (4401) Aditi at Collaborative Asteroid Lightcurve Link (CALL)); 6.683±0.005 h; 19.2±0.5 h
- Geometric albedo: 0.20 (assumed); 0.343±0.204
- Spectral type: S
- Absolute magnitude (H): 15.50; 16.0

4401 Aditi (provisional designation 1985 TB) is an eccentric, stony asteroid, classified as a near-Earth object and Amor asteroid, approximately 1.8 kilometers in diameter. It was discovered on 14 October 1985 by American astronomer Carolyn Shoemaker at Palomar Observatory in California, and later named after the Hindu goddess Aditi.

== Classification and orbit ==
Aditi orbits the Sun at a distance of 1.1–4.0 AU once every 4 years and 2 months (1,513 days). Its orbit has an eccentricity of 0.56 and an inclination of 27° with respect to the ecliptic. The asteroid's observation arc begins with its discovery, as no precoveries were taken and no identifications were made before 1985.

With an Earth minimum orbit intersection distance, MOID, of 0.3302 AU (49,000,000 km), or 128.6 lunar distances, it never approaches Earth close enough to be classified as a potentially hazardous object, for which an upper MOID-limit of 0.05 AU is defined.

== Physical characteristics ==
=== Lightcurves ===
Two rotational lightcurves of Aditi were obtained from photometric observations by American astronomer Brian Warner at his Palmer Divide Observatory, Colorado, in August 2014 and March 2015, respectively. The first lightcurve rendered a period of 6.683 hours with a brightness variation of 0.64 (U=3-), while the second one gave a period of 6.670 hours with an amplitude of 0.29 magnitude (U=3).

Additional lightcurves were obtained by Benishek (U=n.a.) and Manzini (U=1+).

=== Diameter and albedo ===
According to the survey carried out by NASA's space-based Wide-field Infrared Survey Explorer with its subsequent NEOWISE mission, Aditi has a high albedo of 0.34 with a corresponding diameter of 1.80 kilometers.

The Collaborative Asteroid Lightcurve Link assumes a standard albedo for stony S-type asteroids of 0.20 and calculates a slightly larger diameter of 1.88 kilometers, as the lower the body's albedo (reflectivity), the higher its diameter, at a constant absolute magnitude (brightness).

== Naming ==
This minor planet is named after the Hindu goddess Aditi, celestial mother of every existing form and being. She was the mother of the thirty-three gods, including the Vasus, the Rudras, and the Ādityas, the twelve zodiacal spirits. She is described in Vedic literature as the gods of the heavenly light. The official naming citation was published on 30 January 1991 (M.P.C. 17656).
