= 7088 Ishtar =

Asteroid named after goddess Ishtar

Discovery
- Discovered by: C. Shoemaker
- Discovery site: Palomar Obs.
- Discovery date: 1 January 1992

Designations
- Pronunciation: /ˈɪʃtɑːr/
- Named after: Ishtar (Mesopotamian goddess)
- Alternative designations: 1992 AA
- Minor planet category: NEO · Amor; Binary

Orbital characteristics
- Epoch 27 April 2019 (JD 2458600.5)
- Uncertainty parameter 0
- Observation arc: 38.52 yr (14,071 d)
- Aphelion: 2.7551 AU
- Perihelion: 1.2057 AU
- Semi-major axis: 1.9804 AU
- Eccentricity: 0.3912
- Orbital period (sidereal): 2.79 yr (1,018 d)
- Mean anomaly: 284.83°
- Mean motion: 0° 21^{m} 12.96^{s} / day
- Inclination: 8.3045°
- Longitude of ascending node: 102.65°
- Argument of perihelion: 354.73°
- Known satellites: 1 (P:20.65 h; D: 330 m)
- Earth MOID: 0.2230 AU (86.9 LD)

Physical characteristics
- Mean diameter: 1.298±0.261 km (primary); 1.51 km (effective)
- Synodic rotation period: 2.6790±0.0002 h
- Geometric albedo: 0.260±0.122
- Spectral type: U
- Absolute magnitude (H): 16.7; 16.80

7088 Ishtar, provisional designation 1992 AA, is a synchronous binary asteroid and near-Earth object from the Amor group, approximately 1.3 kilometers (0.81 miles) in diameter. It was discovered on 1 January 1992, by American astronomer Carolyn Shoemaker at the Palomar Observatory in California. The relatively bright asteroid with an unknown spectral type has a rotation period of 2.7 hours. In December 2005, a 330-meter sized satellite was discovered, orbiting its primary every 20.65 hours.

== Orbit and classification ==
Ishtar orbits the Sun at a distance of 1.2–2.8 AU once every 2 years and 9 months (1,018 days; semi-major axis of 1.98 AU). Its orbit has an eccentricity of 0.39 and an inclination of 8° with respect to the ecliptic. The body's observation arc begins with its first observation at the Siding Spring Observatory in March 1981, almost 11 years prior to its official discovery observation at Palomar.

== Naming ==
This minor planet was named after the ancient Mesopotamian goddess Ishtar (Inanna). She is the principal goddess of the Assyrians and Babylonians associated with love, fertility, sex and war. The official naming citation was published by the Minor Planet Center on 22 April 1997 (M.P.C. 29671).

== Physical characteristics ==
Ishtar has an unknown spectral type (U). The Collaborative Asteroid Lightcurve Link (CALL) assumes standard S-type asteroid due to its relatively high albedo (see below).

=== Rotation period ===
In December 2005, a rotational lightcurve of Ishtar was obtained from photometric observations by Vishnu Reddy and collaborators. Lightcurve analysis gave a rotation period of 2.6790±0.0002 h hours with a brightness amplitude of 0.11 magnitude (U=3).

=== Diameter and albedo ===
According to the survey carried out by the NEOWISE mission of NASA's Wide-field Infrared Survey Explorer, Ishtar measures 1.298 kilometers in diameter and its surface has an albedo of 0.26. The Collaborative Asteroid Lightcurve Link assumes an albedo of 0.20 and derives a diameter of 1.16 kilometers based on an absolute magnitude of 17.08.
