= Beckman =

Beckman may refer to:

- Beckman (surname)
- Arnold Orville Beckman, chemist and entrepreneur
- Beckman Coulter, a biomedical laboratory instruments company founded by Arnold O. Beckman
- Beckman Coulter Life Sciences, a life sciences company focused on research instruments and reagents for enabling new discoveries
- 3737 Beckman, an asteroid
- Institutes and research centers supported by the Arnold and Mabel Beckman Foundation
  - Beckman Center for Molecular and Genetic Medicine at Stanford University, Stanford, California
  - Beckman Institute at Caltech, California Institute of Technology, Pasadena, California
    - Beckman Institute Laser Resource Center (BILRC) at Caltech
  - Beckman Institute for Advanced Science and Technology, University of Illinois at Urbana-Champaign
  - Beckman Laser Institute, University of California, Irvine, in Irvine, California
  - Beckman Research Institute (BRI) at the City of Hope National Medical Center in Duarte, California, United States
- Schools
  - Arnold O. Beckman High School, a high school in Irvine, California named after Arnold Orville Beckman
  - Beckman High School (Dyersville, Iowa), a Roman Catholic high school in Dyersville, Iowa, named for Archbishop Francis J. L. Beckman

== See also ==
- Beckmann (disambiguation)
