= Beckmann =

Beckmann is a German surname. Notable people with the surname include:

- Astrid Beckmann (born 1957), German physicist
- Ernst Otto Beckmann (1853–1923), German chemist and discoverer of the Beckmann rearrangement
- Friedrich Beckmann (1803–1866), German actor
- Jens Beckmann (born 1970), German-Australian chemist
- Johann Beckmann (1739–1811), German scientific author
- Juan Domingo Beckmann (born 1967), Mexican businessman
- Juan Beckmann Vidal (born 1940), Mexican businessman
- Klaus Beckmann (1944–1994), German politician
- Ludwig Beckmann (died 20 January 1965), German First World War flying ace
- Matthias Beckmann (born 1984), German jazz musician
- Max Beckmann (1884–1950), German painter
- Mikkel Beckmann (born 1983), Danish footballer
- Petr Beckmann (1924–1993), Czech-American dissident physicist
- Reinhold Beckmann (born 1956), German journalist and TV presenter
- Rudolf Beckmann (1910–1943), German Nazi SS-Oberscharführer
- Josef Beckmann (1920–2001), World War II German lieutenant

== See also ==
- Beckman (surname)
- Beckman (disambiguation)
