= Karen Beckman (disambiguation) =

Karen Beckman may refer to:

- Karen Bridge (1960–2020), English badminton player
- Karen Redrobe, American art historian
- Karen Beckmann Legorreta, Jose Cuervo heiress
