= Beckman (surname) =

Beckman is a surname.

Notable people with the surname include:

- Adam Beckman (born 2001), Canadian ice hockey player
- Åsa Beckman (born 1961), Swedish literary critic
- Arnold Orville Beckman (1900–2004) American chemist
- Bengt Beckman (1925–2012), Swedish mathematician, professor, and author
- Brad Beckman (1964–1989), American football tight end
- Cameron Beckman (born 1970), American professional golfer
- Candice Michelle, full name Candice Michelle Beckman-Ehrlich (born 1978), American model, actress, and professional wrestler
- Charles Beckman, American tennis player
- Charles Beckman (Wisconsin politician), American politician
- David Beckman (born 1938), former Canadian Football League head coach
- Brig. Gen. Diane Beckman, fictional character in the U.S. TV series Chuck
- Ed Beckman (born 1955), former professional American football tight end
- Erik Beckman (1935–1995), Swedish poet, novelist, and playwright
- Francis Beckman (1875–1948), former archbishop of Dubuque
- Henry Beckman, Canadian stage, film and television actor
- James Mark Beckman, (born 1962) American Roman Catholic bishop-elect
- John Beckman (1895–1968), American basketball player
- Joshua Beckman, American poet
- Lars Beckman (born 1967), Swedish politician
- Louis E. Beckman (1876–1946), American politician
- Louis E. Beckman Jr. (1914–1992), American politician
- Manoel Beckman, 17th century Brazilian rebel
- Mary Beckman, professor of linguistics at Ohio State University
- Nils Beckman (1902–1972), Swedish jurist and civil servant
- Otto Ludvig Beckman (1856–1909), Swedish Coastal Artillery major general
- Raymond Beckman, former American soccer player
- Thea Beckman (1923–2004), Dutch author

== See also ==
- Beckmann (surname)
