= Reserva de la Familia =

Reserva de la Familia Tequila
- Type: 100% de Agave Tequilas
- Manufacturer: Jose Cuervo
- Origin: Mexico
- Alcohol by volume: 40%
- Proof (US): 80%
- Variants: Silver, Reposado, Cristalino, Extra-Añejo
- Website: https://reservadelafamilia.com/

Reserva de la Familia was launched in 1995 with a tequila aged for more years than the industry norm. It was launch with extra-añejo tequila, which is tequila aged for more than 36 months in barrels of a capacity at the maximum of 600 liters. These classifications are set by Mexico's governing certification body for the tequila industry,Consejo Regulador del Tequila (CRT).

== History ==
Reserva de la Famila is a tequila brand owned and produced by the Beckmann family, who also own Jose Cuervo Tequila. The tequila is produced at the La Rojeña Distillery, Jalisco, Mexico. Tequila has an appellation of Origin that limits the production of tequila to a speciafic geographical area.

== Products ==
By law, it is mandatory according to CRT that tequila be made from one type of agave, namely, the Blue Weber Tequilana agave. The tequilas produced under the Reserva de la Familia brand are made with 100% blue agave. As of 2026, production included Extra-Añejo (aged a minimum of 3 years); Platino (unaged tequila); Reposado (aged 9 months); Cristalino (aged, then filtered to remove color). All Reserva de la Familia products are 40% ABV and 80-proof.

== Cultural ==
Since 2024, the Michelin Guide has had a partnership with Reserva de a Familia to highlight Mexican gastronomy.
