= Edgar Stanley Freed =

American chemical engineer (1889–1950)

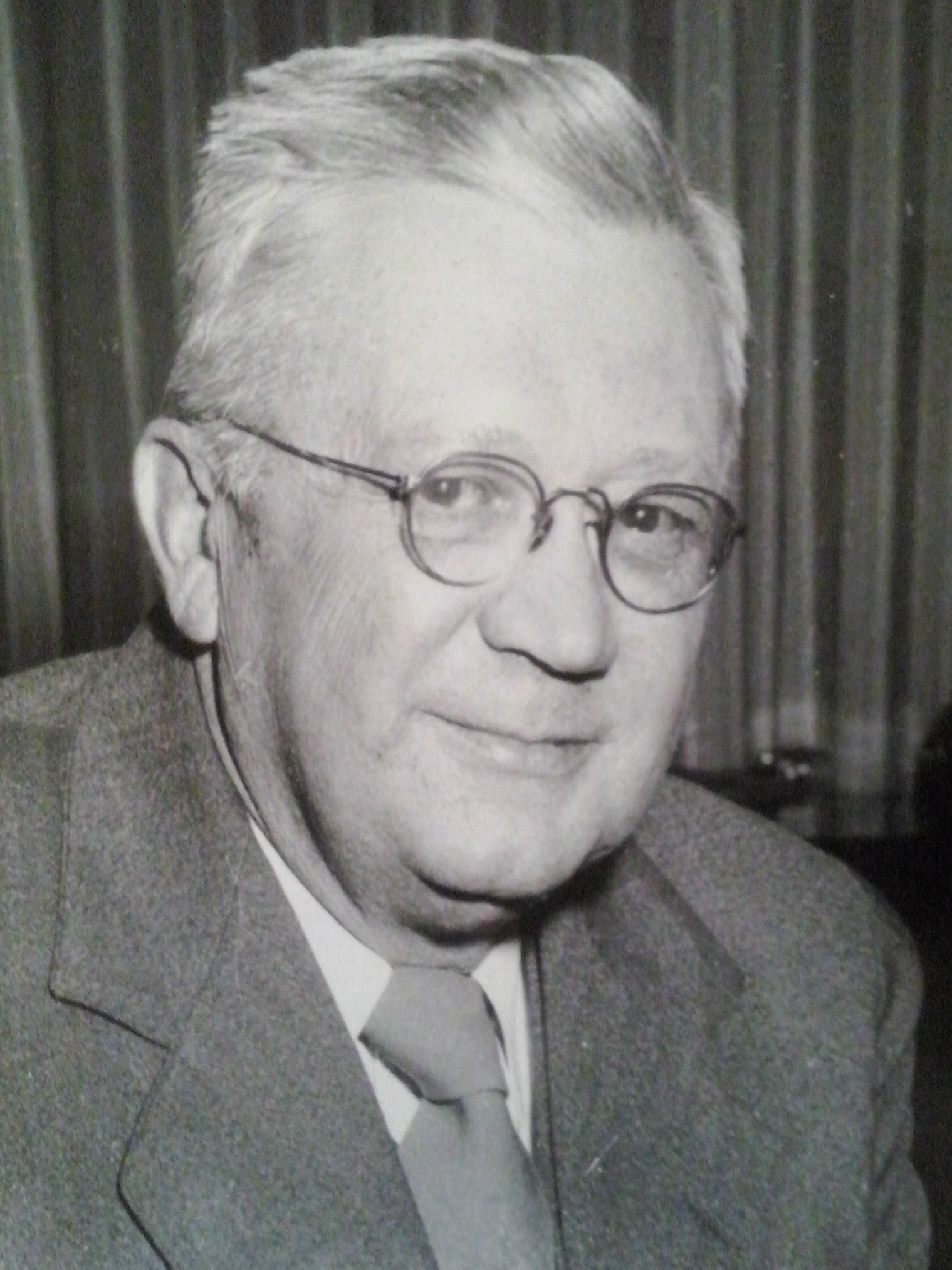
- Portrait of E. S. Freed
- Born: August 8, 1889; Mount Pleasant, Pennsylvania, U.S.
- Died: November 2, 1950 (aged 61); María Elena, Antofagasta, Chile
- Education: University of Tennessee (B.S.), MIT (M.S., Ph.D.)
- Occupation: Chemical engineer
- Known for: Solar evaporation system, Freed cement, and study of caliche ore by-products
- Spouse: Amalia González

Edgar Stanley Freed (August 8, 1889 – November 2, 1950) was an American chemical engineer whose pioneering work in Chile transformed the nitrate and non-metallic mining industries during the first half of the twentieth century. He is best known for developing large-scale solar evaporation ponds, a technology that enabled the recovery of valuable minerals from low-grade caliche deposits in the Atacama Desert. His innovations—including the self-sealing mixture known as Freed Cement and the Solar Evaporation System—remain central to the production of iodine and specialty fertilizers in northern Chile.

== Early life and education ==
Freed was born in Mount Pleasant, Pennsylvania, on August 8, 1889. He earned a Bachelor of Science in Chemistry from the University of Tennessee in 1912, where he was noted for his theoretical insight. He stayed for postgraduate research and teaching, receiving the degree of Chemical Engineer in 1914. That same year, he entered the Massachusetts Institute of Technology (MIT), completing a Master of Science in 1916 and a Ph.D. in Chemistry in 1918 under Arthur Amos Noyes.

== Career in Chile ==
In 1922, Freed moved to Chile, recruited by the Chile Exploration Company, part of the Guggenheim industrial group, to design and operate an experimental nitrate plant at a time when the natural nitrate industry was in decline following the advent of synthetic ammonia. Over the next 28 years he worked to modernize and sustain nitrate extraction in the Atacama Desert.

=== The Guggenheim Process ===
Freed contributed to optimizing the chemical and mechanical stages of the Guggenheim Process—an integrated method combining chemical leaching, mechanical separation, and heat recovery that greatly improved efficiency and reduced costs.

=== The Solar Evaporation System and Freed Cement ===
Freed's principal invention was the Solar Evaporation System, which employed shallow ponds and solar energy to concentrate nitrate solutions. The design allowed recovery of sodium sulfate, magnesium sulfate, and borax as by-products. To stabilize the ponds against seismic damage, Freed created a self-sealing mixture known as Freed Cement, which hardened when in contact with saline solutions.

=== Later years (1945–1950) ===
In 1945, Freed and engineer H. M. Crozier co-authored technical reports on the mechanization of the Victoria nitrate works for the Compañía Salitrera de Tarapacá y Antofagasta (COSATAN), documenting innovations in automation and process control. He continued advising nitrate operations until his death in María Elena in 1950.

== Legacy ==
According to Time magazine (April 30 1956), large-scale adoption of Freed's process allowed Chilean nitrate companies to commercialize new by-products such as sodium sulfate, magnesium sulfate, and borax. In Pensamiento y Acción (1958), Chilean president Eduardo Frei Montalva praised Freed's cement as "a feat that the country has not sufficiently valued or acknowledged."

On November 2, 2025, El Mercurio de Antofagasta published two commemorative articles marking seventy-five years since Freed's death. The features reviewed his technical and industrial contributions, emphasizing that the Solar Evaporation System and Freed Cement remain essential components of Chile's nitrate industry.

Freed's evaporation system continues to underpin modern production in northern Chile: SQM operates over 200 solar evaporation ponds based on his principles. Historians consider Freed a bridge between the nitrate era and modern non-metallic mining.

== Selected publications ==
- Freed, Edgar Stanley (1913). The Examination of Tennessee Zinc Blends for Indium. University of Tennessee.
- Noyes, Arthur A.; Freed, E. Stanley (March 1920). "A Thermodynamic Investigation of Reactions Involving Silver Sulfide and Silver Iodide". Journal of the American Chemical Society. 42 (3): 476–487. doi:10.1021/ja01448a013. ISSN 0002-7863.
- Burdick, Charles L.; Freed, E. Stanley (March 1921). "The Equilibrium Between Nitric Oxide, Nitrogen Peroxide and Aqueous Solution of Nitric Acid". Journal of the American Chemical Society. 43 (3): 518–530. doi:10.1021/ja01436a015. ISSN 0002-7863.
- Sodium Sulfate of Chile: A Summary of the Method of Production. Paper Makers Chemical Corporation. 1933.
- The Guggenheim Process for Nitrate Recovery and Some Remarks on the Possibilities of By-products (in Spanish). Anales Del Primer Congreso Panamericano de Ingeniería de Minas Y Geología. 1942.
