= Roscoe G. Dickinson =

American chemist (1894–1945)

Roscoe Dickinson
- Born: May 3, 1894; Brewer, Maine, United States
- Died: July 13, 1945 (aged 51); Pasadena, California, United States
- Education: MIT and Caltech
- Known for: X-ray crystallography
- Scientific career
- Fields: Chemist
- Workplaces: Caltech
- Doctoral advisor: Arthur Amos Noyes
- Doctoral students: Linus Pauling; Richard M. Noyes; Arnold Orville Beckman

Roscoe Gilkey Dickinson (May 3, 1894 – July 13, 1945) was an American chemist, known primarily for his work on X-ray crystallography. As professor of chemistry at the California Institute of Technology (Caltech), he was the doctoral advisor of Nobel laureate Linus Pauling and of Arnold O. Beckman, inventor of the pH meter.

Dickinson received his undergraduate education at the Massachusetts Institute of Technology and, in 1920, became the first person to receive a PhD from Caltech (which had recently changed its name from Throop College). For his dissertation he had studied the crystal structures of wulfenite, scheelite, sodium chlorate, and sodium bromate. His graduate advisor was Arthur Amos Noyes.
