= Juan Domingo Beckmann =

Mexican businessman

- Born: Juan Domingo Beckmann Legorreta; July 1967 (age 58)
- Education: Universidad Anahuac
- Occupation: Businessman
- Known for: 30% owner, José Cuervo
- Title: CEO, José Cuervo
- Parent: Juan Beckmann Vidal

Juan Domingo Beckmann Legorreta (born July 1967) is a Mexican businessman, the chief executive officer (CEO) of José Cuervo. He also owns 30% of the company, giving him a net worth of US$1 billion, as of 2016. His father Juan Beckmann Vidal and his sister own together another 55%.

He has a bachelor's degree in business administration and a master's degree in marketing from the Universidad Anahuac.

In March 2020, he tested positive for COVID-19 during the 2020 coronavirus epidemic in Mexico, following a party held in his honor in Tequila, Jalisco.
