= Matthias Beckmann =

German jazz musician

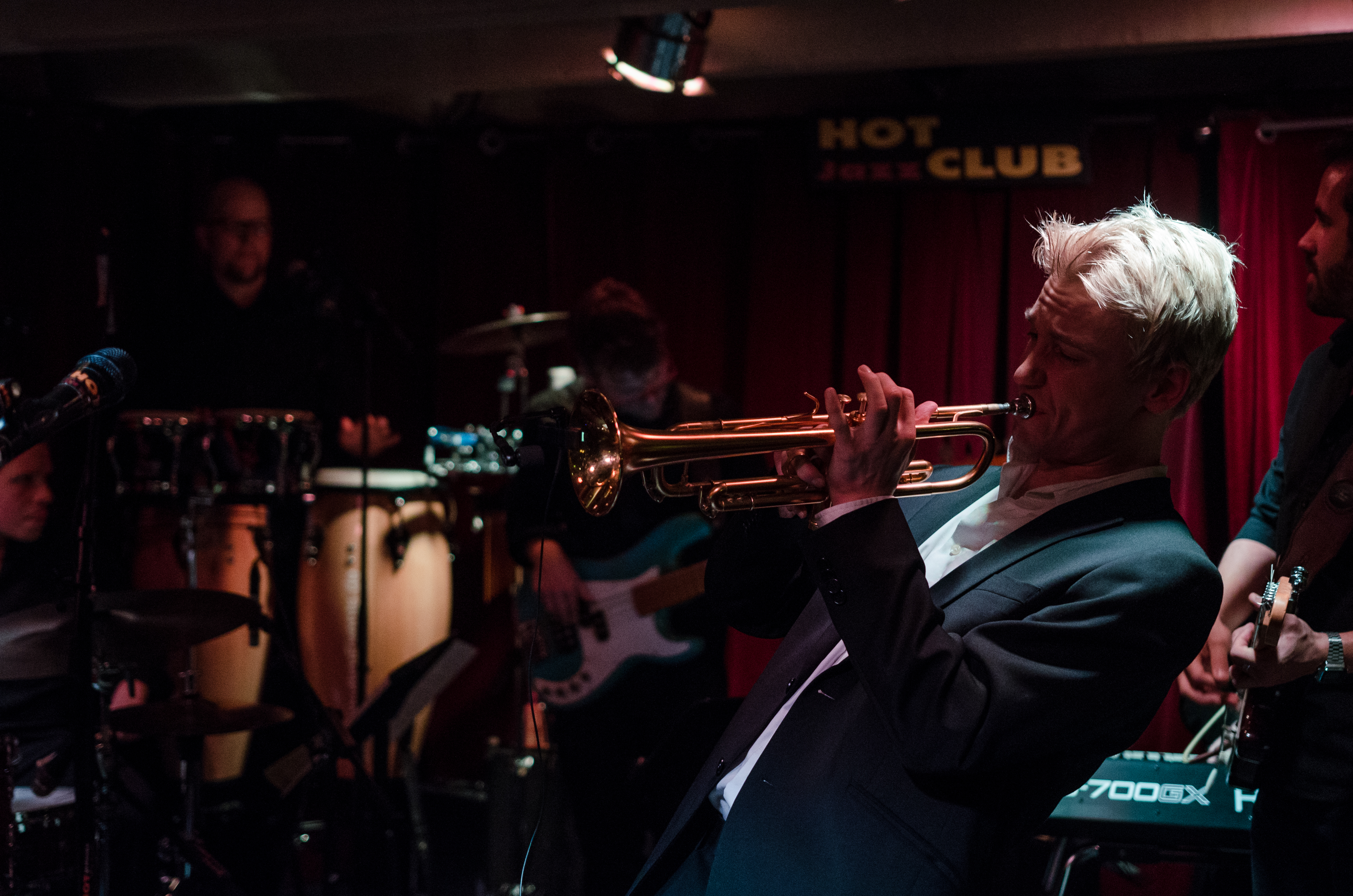
- Matthias Beckmann and his Band at Hot Jazz Club Münster 2015

Background information
- Born: October 5, 1984 (age 40); Münster

Matthias Beckmann (born October 5, 1984) is a German jazz trumpeter and flugelhornist, instructor, composer and arranger.

Beckmann was born in Münster, North Rhine-Westphalia and began playing trumpet in a trombone choire as a child. Then he studied music at the Royal Conservatory of The Hague and ArtEZ Conservatorium Enschede under Eric Vloeimans. He joined several master classes amongst others with Ack van Rooyen and Till Brönner.

Matthias Beckmann worked in projects with Dr. Ring-Ding, Roger Trash, Markus Wentz and the Soulband "Soulfamily". He plays a B5 trumpet and a BR2 fluegelhorn from Hub van Laar.

== Awards ==
- Winner at Jugend jazzt NRW (2005)

== Discography ==
- Mpenzi Wangu (2017 Mons Records)
