= Arnold Beckman =

American chemist and inventor

Arnold Orville Beckman
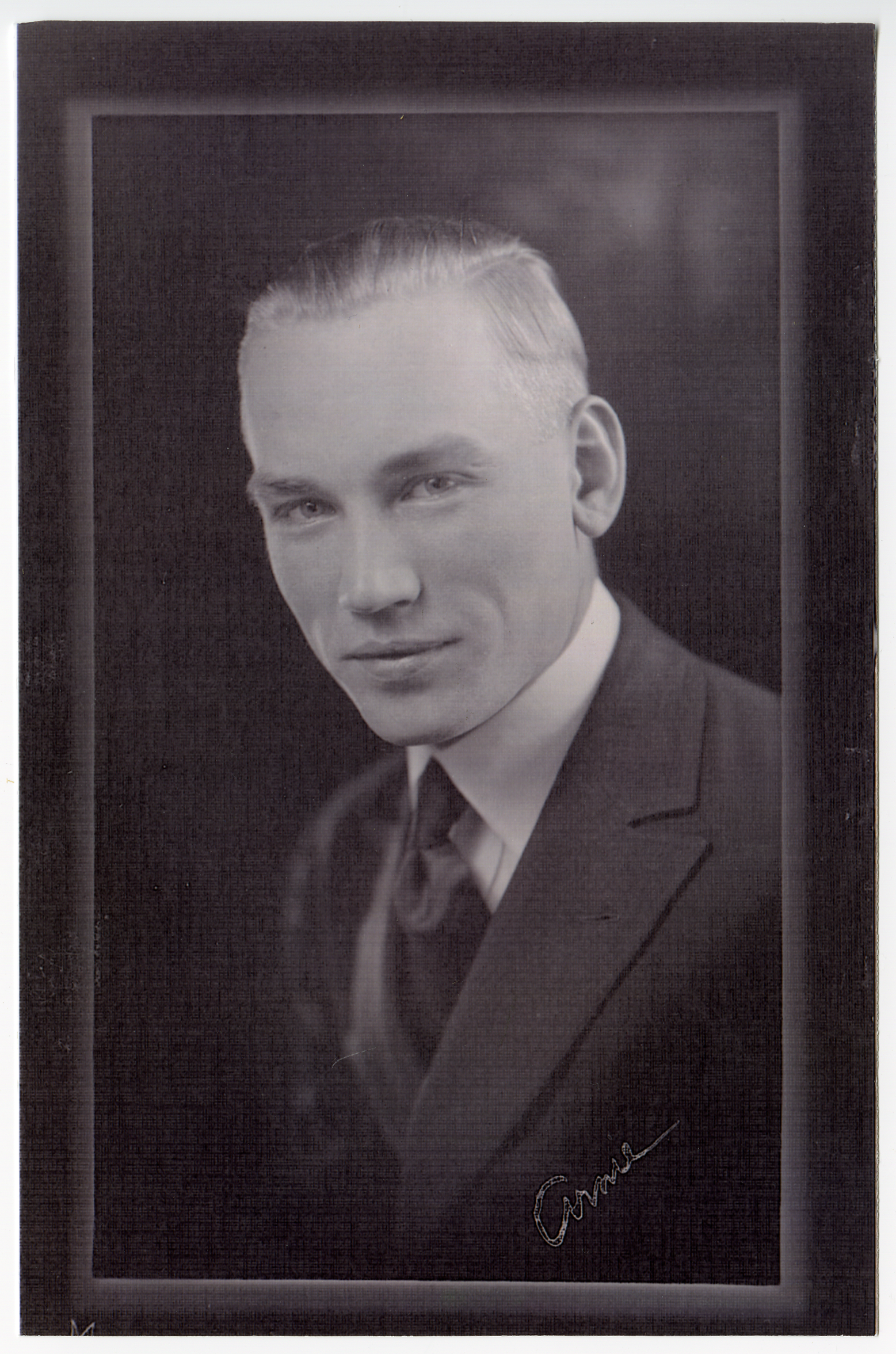
- Arnold Beckman, ca. 1921
- Born: April 10, 1900; Cullom, Illinois, US
- Died: May 18, 2004 (aged 104); La Jolla, California, US
- Education: University of Illinois Urbana-Champaign; California Institute of Technology
- Spouse: Mabel Meinzer Beckman (m. 1925; died 1989)
- Awards: Hoover Medal (1981); Tolman Award (1985); Vermilye Medal (1987); National Medal of Technology (1988); National Medal of Science (1989); Presidential Citizens Medal (1989); Bower Award (1992); Public Welfare Medal (1999); Othmer Gold Medal (2000)
- Scientific career
- Fields: Physical Chemistry
- Workplaces: Caltech; Beckman Instruments
- Doctoral advisor: Roscoe G. Dickinson

External videos
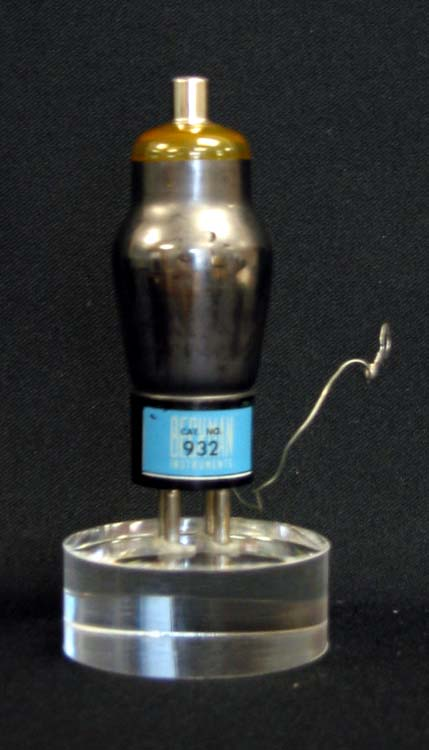
- Scientists You Must Know: Arnold O. Beckman, "The fun, the heart of the thing, is in the technical aspects", Science History Institute
- The Instrumental Chemist: The Incredible Curiosity of Arnold O. Beckman (trailer), Science History Institute
- Harry B. Gray, How Arnold O. Beckman's Instrumental Voice Shaped Chemistry's History, Profiles in Chemistry, Science History Institute

Arnold Orville Beckman (April 10, 1900 – May 18, 2004) was an American chemist, inventor, investor, and philanthropist. While a professor at California Institute of Technology, he founded Beckman Instruments based on his 1934 invention of the pH meter, a device for measuring acidity (and alkalinity), later considered to have "revolutionized the study of chemistry and biology". He also developed the DU spectrophotometer, "probably the most important instrument ever developed towards the advancement of bioscience". Beckman funded the Shockley Semiconductor Laboratory, the first silicon transistor company in California, thus giving rise to Silicon Valley. In 1965, he retired as president of Beckman Instruments, instead becoming the chairman of its board of directors. On November 23, 1981, he agreed to sell the company, which was then merged with SmithKline to form SmithKline Beckman. After retirement, he and his wife Mabel (1900–1989) were numbered among the top philanthropists in the United States.

== Early life ==
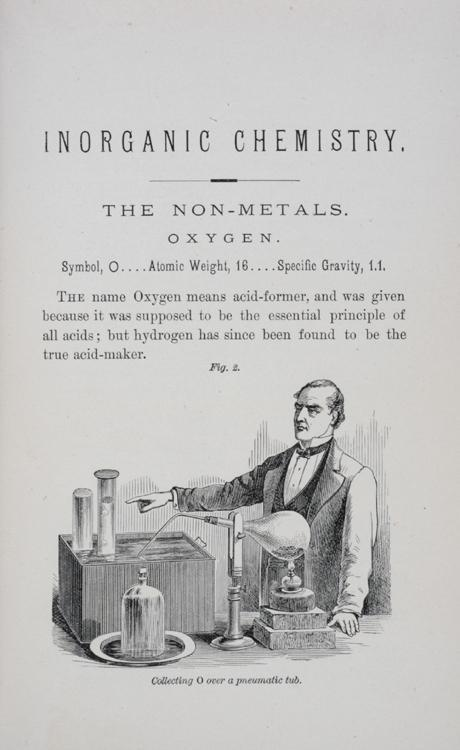
Joel Dorman Steele's 1868 book Fourteen Weeks in Chemistry (p.27 of the 1873 edition shown) inspired Beckman at the age of 9.

Beckman was born in Cullom, Illinois, a village of about 500 people in a farming community. He was the youngest son of George Beckman, a blacksmith, and his second wife Elizabeth Ellen Jewkes. He was curious about the world from an early age. When he was nine, Beckman found an 1868 chemistry textbook, Joel Dorman Steele's Fourteen Weeks in Chemistry, and began trying out the experiments. His father encouraged his scientific interests by letting him convert a toolshed into a laboratory.

Beckman's mother, Elizabeth, died of diabetes in 1912. Beckman's father sold his blacksmith shop, and became a travelling salesman for blacksmithing tools and materials. A housekeeper, Hattie Lange, was engaged to look after the Beckman children. Arnold Beckman earned money as a "practice pianist" with a local band, and as an "official cream tester" running a centrifuge for a local store.

In 1914, the Beckman family moved to Normal, located just north of Bloomington, Illinois, so that the young Beckmans could attend University High School in Normal, a "laboratory school" associated with Illinois State University. In 1915 they moved to Bloomington itself, but continued to attend University High, where Arnold Beckman obtained permission to take university level classes from professor of chemistry Howard W. Adams. While still in high school, Arnold started his own business, "Bloomington Research Laboratories", doing analytic chemistry for the local gas company. He also performed at night as a movie-house pianist, and played with local dance bands. He graduated valedictorian of his class, with an average of 89.41 over four years, the highest attained.

Beckman was allowed to leave school a few months early to contribute to the First World War effort in early 1918 by working as a chemist. At Keystone Steel and Iron he took samples of molten iron and tested them to see if the chemical composition of carbon, sulfur, manganese and phosphorus was suitable for pouring steel.

When Beckman turned 18 in August 1918, he enlisted in the United States Marines. After three months at marine boot camp on Parris Island, South Carolina, he was sent to the Brooklyn Navy Yard, for transit to the war in Europe. Because of a train delay, another unit embarked in place of Beckman's unit. Then, counted into groups in the barracks, Beckman missed being sent to Russia by one space in line. Instead, Arnold spent Thanksgiving at the local YMCA, where he met 17-year-old Mabel Stone Meinzer, who was helping to serve the meal. Mabel would become his wife. A few days later, the armistice was signed, ending the war.

== University education ==
Beckman attended the University of Illinois Urbana–Champaign beginning in the fall of 1918. During his freshman year, he worked with Carl Shipp Marvel on the synthesis of organic mercury compounds, but both men became ill from exposure to toxic mercury. As a result, Beckman changed his major from organic chemistry to physical chemistry, where he worked with Worth Rodebush, T. A. White, and Gerhard Dietrichson. He earned his bachelor's degree in chemical engineering in 1922 and his master's degree in physical chemistry in 1923. For his master's degree he studied the thermodynamics of aqueous ammonia solutions, a subject introduced to him by T. A. White.

Soon after arriving at the University of Illinois, Beckman joined the Delta Upsilon fraternity. He was initiated into Zeta chapter of Alpha Chi Sigma, the chemistry fraternity, in 1921 and the Gamma Alpha Graduate Scientific Fraternity in December 1922.

Beckman decided to go to California Institute of Technology (Caltech) for his doctorate. He stayed there for a year, before returning to New York to be near his fiancée, Mabel, who was working as a secretary for the Equitable Life Assurance Society. He found a job with Western Electric's engineering department, the precursor to the Bell Telephone Laboratories. Working with Walter A. Shewhart, Beckman developed quality control programs for the manufacture of vacuum tubes and learned about circuit design. It was here that Beckman discovered his interest in electronics.

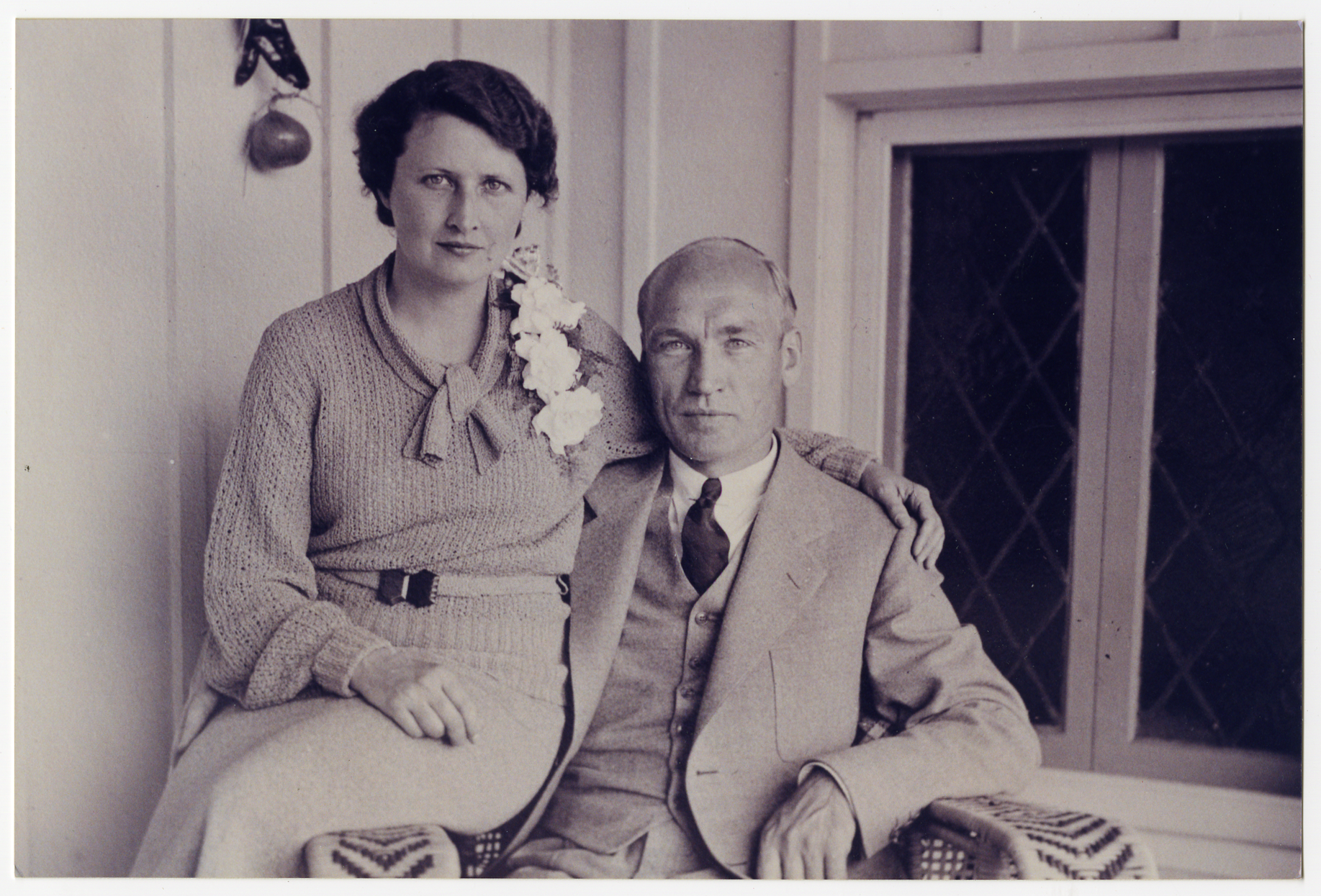
Mabel and Arnold Beckman

The couple married June 10, 1925and moved back to California in 1926, where Beckman resumed his studies at Caltech. He became interested in ultraviolet photolysis and worked with his doctoral advisor, Roscoe G. Dickinson, on an instrument to find the energy of ultraviolet light. It worked by shining the ultraviolet light onto a thermocouple, converting the incident heat into electricity, which drove a galvanometer. After receiving a Ph.D. in photochemistry in 1928 for this application of quantum theory to chemical reactions, Beckman was asked to stay on at Caltech as an instructor and then as a professor. Linus Pauling, another of Roscoe G. Dickinson's graduate students, was also asked to stay on at Caltech.

== Relationship with Caltech ==
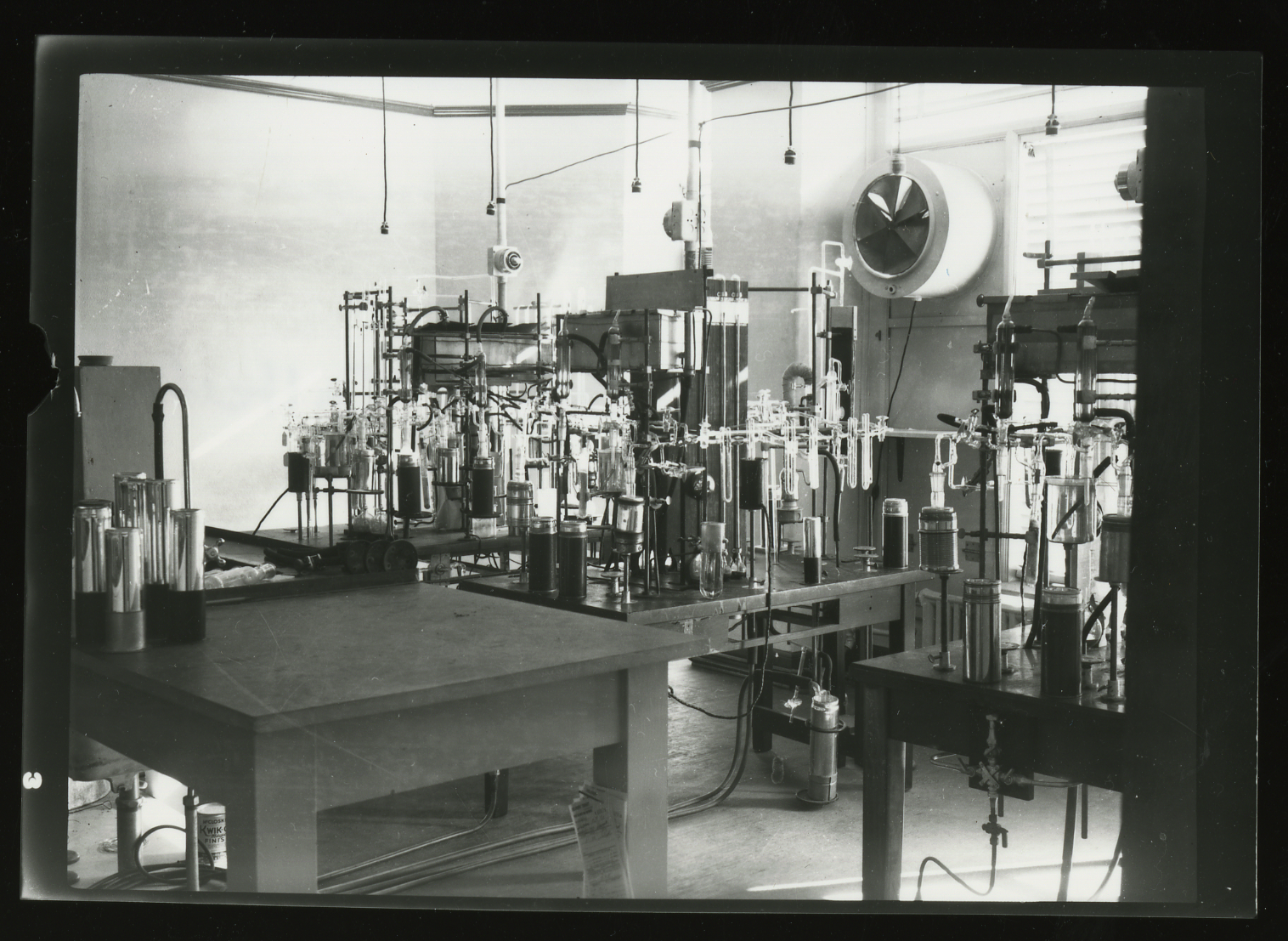
Arnold Beckman's laboratory at Caltech

During his time at Caltech, Beckman was active in teaching at both the introductory and advanced graduate levels. Beckman shared his expertise in glass-blowing by teaching classes in the machine shop. He also taught classes in the design and use of research instruments. Beckman dealt first-hand with the chemists' need for good instrumentation as manager of the chemistry department's instrument shop. Beckman's interest in electronics made him very popular within the chemistry department at Caltech, as he was very skilled in building measuring instruments.

Over the time that he was at Caltech, the focus of the department increasingly moved towards pure science and away from chemical engineering and applied chemistry. Arthur Amos Noyes, head of the chemistry division, encouraged both Beckman and chemical engineer William Lacey to be in contact with real-world engineers and chemists, and Robert Andrews Millikan, Caltech's president, referred technical questions to Beckman from government and businesses. With their blessing, Beckman began accepting outside work as a scientific and technical consultant. He also acted as a scientific expert in legal trials.

In 1964, he accepted an offer to become chairman of the Caltech Board of Trustees, where he'd been a member since 1953.

== National Inking Appliance Company ==
Original site of the National Inking Appliance Company, later National Technical Laboratories

In 1934, Millikan referred I. H. Lyons from the National Postal Meter Company to Arnold Beckman. Lyons wanted a non-clogging ink so that postage could be printed by machines, instead of having clerks lick stamps. Beckman's solution was to make ink with butyric acid, a malodorous substance. Because of this ingredient, no manufacturer wanted to manufacture it. Beckman decided to make it himself. He started the National Inking Appliance Company, obtaining space in a garage owned by instrument maker Fred Henson and hiring two Caltech students, Robert Barton and Henry Fracker. Beckman developed and took out a couple of patents for re-inking typewriter ribbons, but marketing them was not successful. This was Beckman's first experience at running a company and marketing a product, and while this first product failed, Beckman repurposed the company for another product.

== pH Meter ==
Beckman model M pH meter

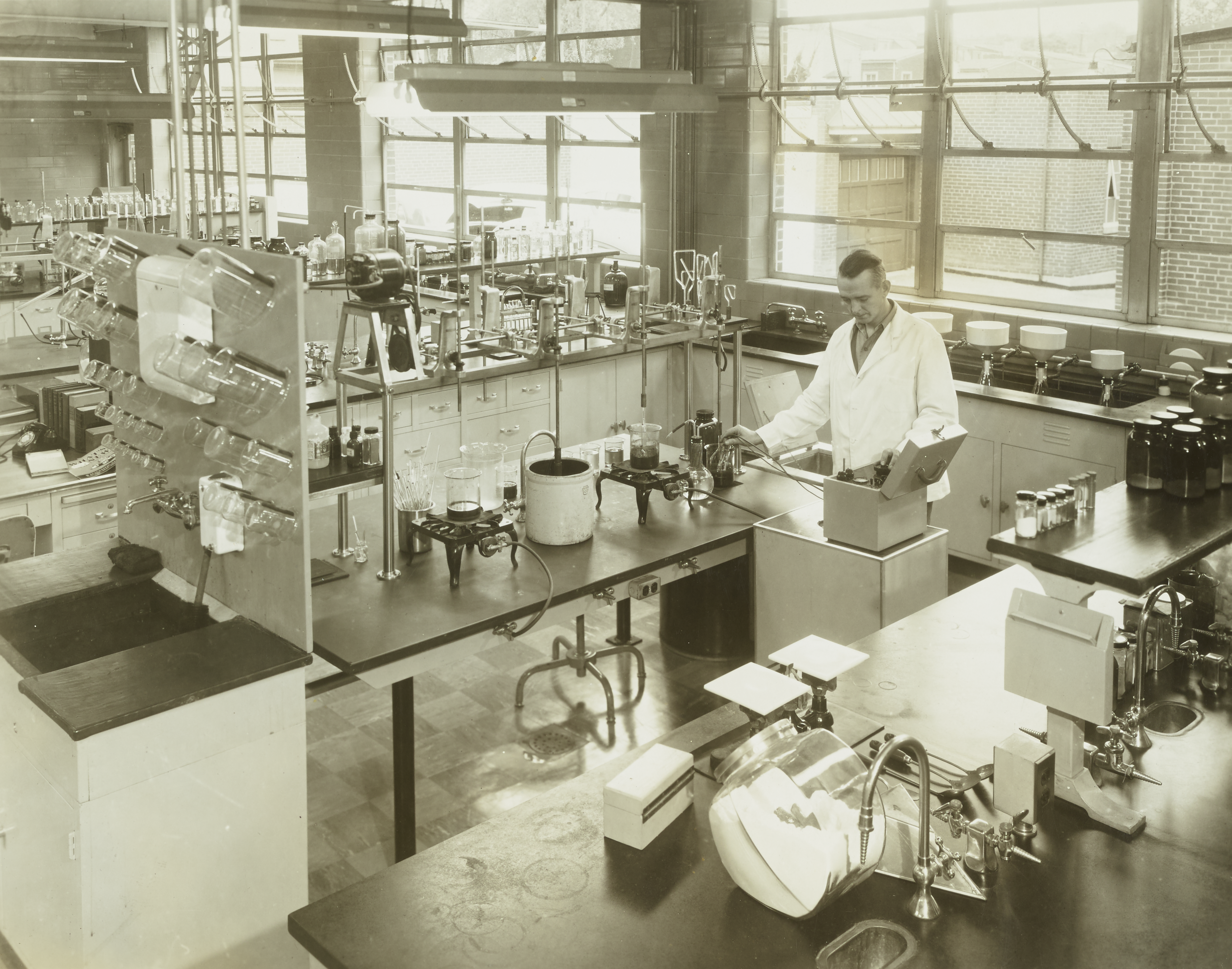
Beckman portable pH meter in use

Sunkist Growers was having problems with its own manufacturing process. Lemons that were not saleable as produce were made into pectin or citric acid, with sulfur dioxide used as a preservative. Sunkist needed to know the acidity of the product at any given time, and the colorimetric methods then in use, such as readings from litmus paper, did not work well because sulfur dioxide interfered with them. Chemist Glen Joseph at Sunkist was attempting to measure the hydrogen-ion concentration in lemon juice electrochemically, but sulfur dioxide damaged hydrogen electrodes, and non-reactive glass electrodes produced weak signals and were fragile.

Joseph approached Beckman, who proposed that instead of trying to increase the sensitivity of his measurements, he amplify his results. Beckman, familiar with glassblowing, electricity, and chemistry, suggested a design for a vacuum-tube amplifier and ended up building a working apparatus for Joseph. The glass electrode used to measure pH was placed in a grid circuit in the vacuum tube, producing an amplified signal which could then be read by an electronic meter. The prototype was so useful that Joseph requested a second unit.

Beckman saw an opportunity, and rethinking the project, decided to create a complete chemical instrument which could be easily transported and used by nonspecialists. By October 1934, he had registered patent application US Patent No. 2,058,761 for his "acidimeter", later renamed the pH meter. The Arthur H. Thomas Company, a nationally known scientific instrument dealer based in Philadelphia, was willing to try selling it. Although it was priced expensively at $195, roughly the starting monthly wage for a chemistry professor at that time, it was significantly cheaper than the estimated cost of building a comparable instrument from individual components, about $500. The original pH meter weighed in at nearly 7 kg, but was a substantial improvement over a benchful of delicate equipment. The earliest meter had a design glitch, in that the pH readings changed with the depth of immersion of the electrodes, but Beckman fixed the problem by sealing the glass bulb of the electrode.

On April 8, 1935, Beckman renamed his company National Technical Laboratories, formally acknowledging his new focus on the making of scientific instruments. The company rented larger quarters at 3330 Colorado Street, and began manufacturing pH meters. The pH meter is an important device for measuring the pH of a solution, and by 11 May 1939, sales were successful enough that Beckman left Caltech to become the full-time president of National Technical Laboratories. By 1940, Beckman was able to take out a loan to build his own 12,000 square foot factory in South Pasadena.

== Spectrophotometry ==
=== Ultraviolet ===
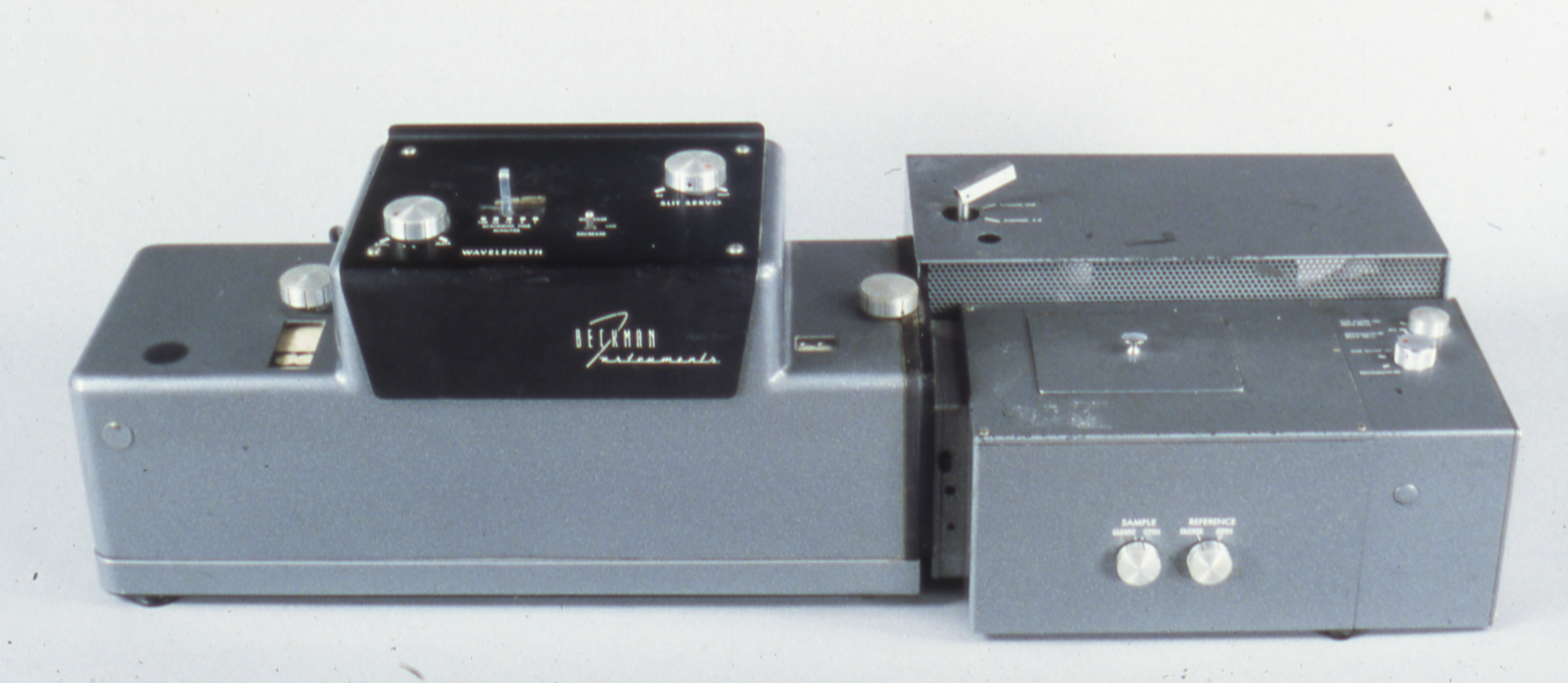
Beckman DK1 ultraviolet spectrophotometer

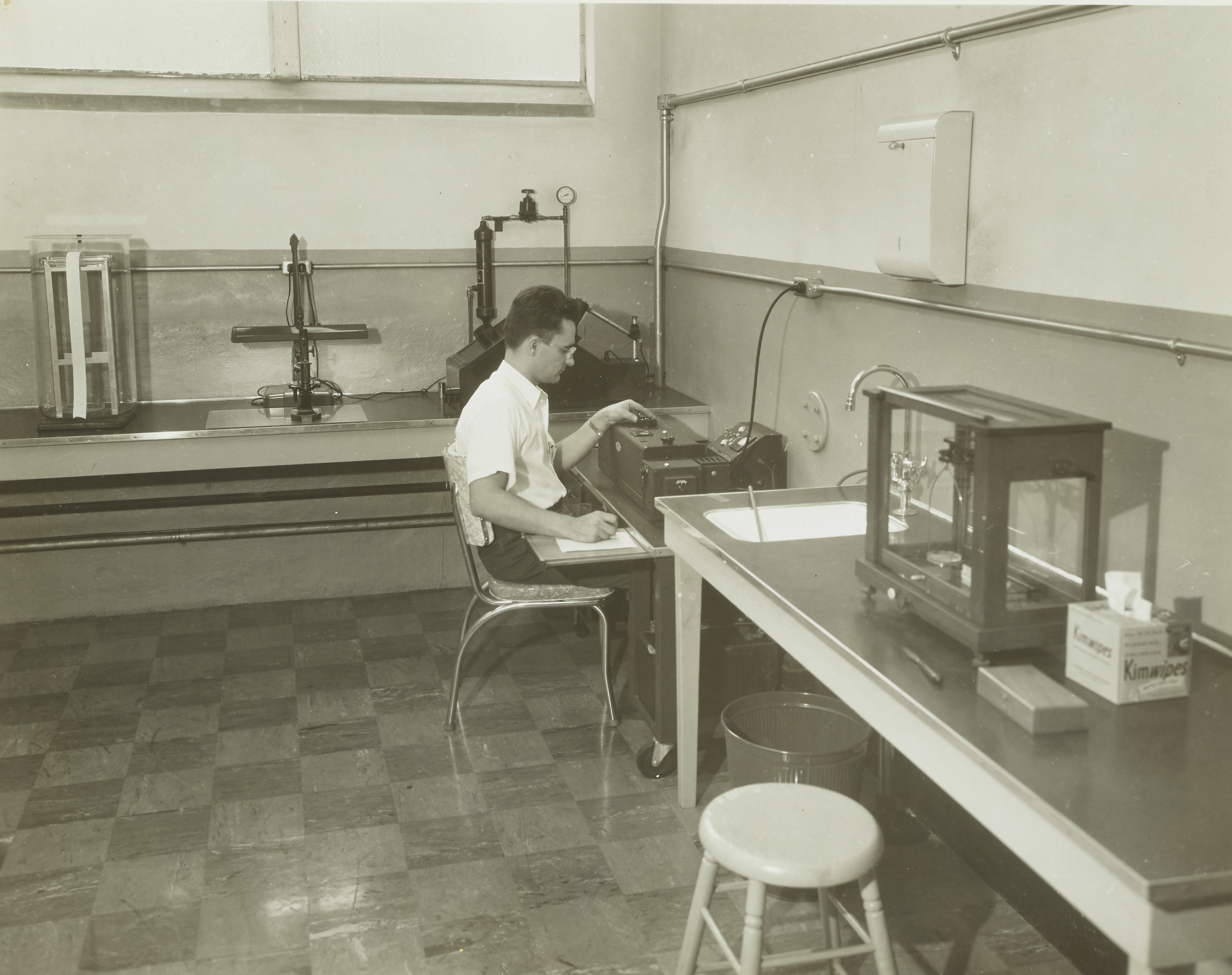
Beckman DU spectrophotometer in use

In 1940, the equipment needed to measure light energy in the visible spectrum could cost a laboratory as much as $3,000, a huge amount at that time. There was also growing interest in examining ultraviolet spectra beyond that range. Just as Beckman had created a single easy-to-use instrument for measuring pH, he made it a goal to create an easy-to-use instrument for spectrophotometry. Beckman's research team, led by Howard Cary, developed several models.

The new spectrophotometers used a prism to separate light into its absorption spectrum and a phototube to electrically measure the light energy across the spectrum. They allowed the user to plot the light absorption spectrum of a substance, giving a standardized "fingerprint", characteristic of a compound. With Beckman's model D, later known as the DU spectrophotometer, National Technical Laboratories successfully provided the first easy-to-use single instrument containing both the optical and electronic components needed for ultraviolet-absorption spectrophotometry. The user could insert a sample, dial up the desired wavelength of light, and read the amount of absorption of that frequency from a simple meter. It produced accurate absorption spectra in both the ultraviolet and the visible regions of the spectrum with relative ease and repeatable accuracy. The National Bureau of Standards ran tests to certify that the DU's results were accurate and repeatable and recommended its use.

Beckman's DU spectrophotometer has been referred to as the "model T" of scientific instruments: "This device forever simplified and streamlined chemical analysis, by allowing researchers to perform a 99.9% accurate quantitative measurement of a substance within minutes, as opposed to the weeks required previously for results of only 25% accuracy." Theodore L. Brown notes that it "revolutionized the measurement of light signals from samples". Nobel laureate Bruce Merrifield is quoted as calling the DU spectrophotometer "probably the most important instrument ever developed towards the advancement of bioscience."

Development of the spectrophotometer also had direct relevance to the war effort. For example, the role of vitamins in health was being studied, and scientists wanted to identify Vitamin A-rich foods to keep soldiers healthy. Previous methods involved feeding rats for several weeks, then performing a biopsy to estimate Vitamin A levels. The DU spectrophotometer yielded better results in a matter of minutes. The DU spectrophotometer was also an important tool for scientists studying and producing the new wonder drug penicillin. By the end of the war, American pharmaceutical companies were producing 650 billion units of penicillin each month. Much of the work done in this area during World War II was kept secret until after the war.

=== Infrared ===
Beckman and his company were involved in a number of secret projects. There was a critical shortage of rubber, which was used in jeep and airplane tires and in tanks. Natural sources from the Far East were unavailable because of the war, and scientists sought a reliable synthetic substitute. Beckman was approached by the Office of Rubber Reserve about developing an infrared spectrophotometer to aid in the study of chemicals such as toluene and butadiene. The Office of Rubber Reserve met secretly in Detroit with Robert Brattain of the Shell Development Company, Arnold O. Beckman, and R. Bowling Barnes of American Cyanamid. Beckman was asked to secretly produce a hundred infrared spectrophotometers to be used by authorized government scientists, based on a design for a single-beam spectrophotometer which had already been developed by Robert Brattain for Shell. The result was the Beckman IR-1 spectrophotometer.

By September 1942, the first of the instruments was being shipped. Approximately 75 IR-1s were made between 1942 and 1945 for use by the US synthetic-rubber effort. The researchers were not allowed to publish or discuss anything related to the new machines until after the war. Other researchers who were independently pursuing the development of infrared spectrometry, were able to publish and to develop instruments during this time without being affected by secrecy restrictions.

Beckman had continued to develop the infrared spectrophotometer after the release of the IR-1. Facing stiff competition, he decided in 1953 to go forward with a radical redesign of the instrument. The result was the IR-4, which could be operated using either a single or double beam of infrared light. This allowed a user to take both the reference measurement and the sample measurement at the same time.

== Other secret projects ==
=== Helipot ===
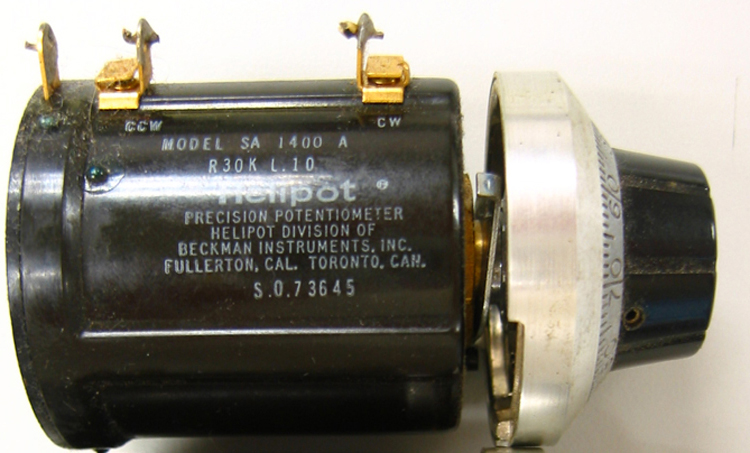
Beckman Helipot potentiometer SA1400A

Helipot microcircuitry, 1966

At the same time that Beckman was approached about infrared spectrometry, he was contacted by Paul Rosenberg. Rosenberg worked at MIT's Radiation Laboratory. The lab was part of a secret network of research institutions in both the United States and Britain that were working to develop radar, "radio detecting and ranging". The project was interested in Beckman because of the high quality of the tuning knobs or "potentiometers" which were used on his pH meters. Beckman had trademarked the design of the pH meter knobs, under the name "helipot" for "helical potentiometer". Rosenberg had found that the helipot was more precise, by a factor of ten, than other knobs. Nonetheless, for use in continuously moving airplanes, ships, or submarines, which might be under attack, a redesign would be needed to ensure that the knobs could withstand shocks and vibrations.

Beckman was not allowed to tell his staff the reason behind the redesign, and they were not particularly interested in the problem; he eventually came up with a solution himself. Instead of using a wire wrapped around a coil, with pressure from a small spring to create a single contact point, he redesigned the knob to have a continuous groove, in which the contact point was contained. The contact point could then move smoothly and continuously, and could not be jarred out of contact. Beckman's model A Helipot was in tremendous demand by the military. Within the first year of its production, its sales became 40% of the company's income. Beckman spun off a separate company, the Helipot Corporation, to take on the electronics component manufactory.

=== Pauling oxygen meter ===
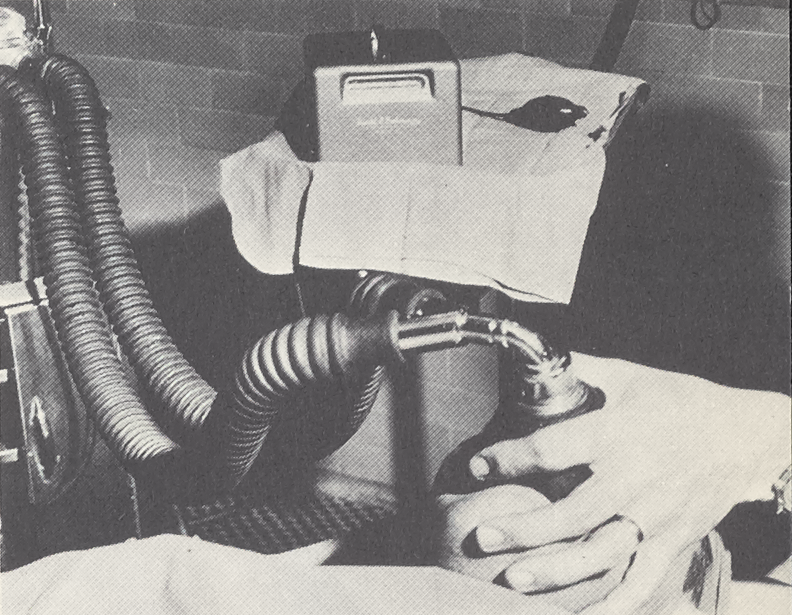
Beckman D2 Oxygen analyzer in use with patient, ca. 1950s

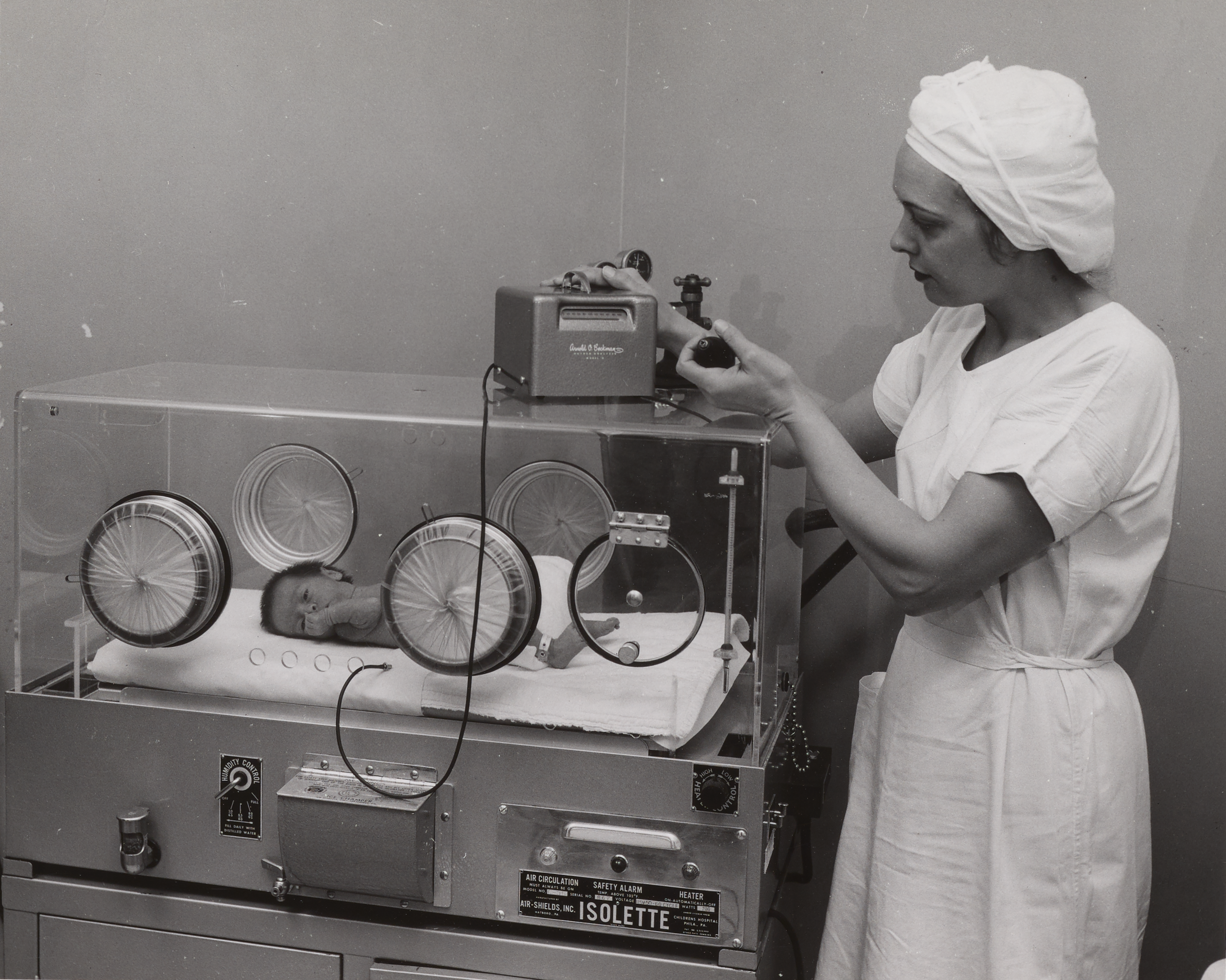
Beckman model D oxygen meter, based on Pauling's design, in use with infant incubator

Linus Pauling at Caltech was also doing secret work for the military. The National Defense Research Committee called a meeting on October 3, 1940, wanting an instrument that could reliably measure oxygen content in a mixture of gases, so that they could measure oxygen conditions in submarines and airplanes. Pauling designed the Pauling oxygen meter for them. Originally approached to supply housing boxes for the meter by Holmes Sturdivant, Pauling's assistant, Beckman was soon asked to produce the entire instrument.

While the board of National Technical Laboratories was unwilling to support the secret project, whose details they could not be told, they agreed that Beckman was free to follow up on it independently. Beckman set up a second spinoff company, Arnold O. Beckman, Inc., for their manufacture. Creating the oxygen meter was a technical challenge, involving the creation of tiny, highly precise glass dumbbells. Beckman created a tiny glass-blowing machine which would generate a precisely measured puff of air to create the glass balls.

After the war, Beckman developed oxygen analyzers for another market. They were used to monitor conditions in incubators for premature babies. Doctors at Johns Hopkins University used them to determine recommendations for healthy oxygen levels for incubators.

=== Manhattan Project ===
Beckman instruments were also used by the Manhattan Project. Scientists in the project were attempting to develop instruments to measure radiation in gas-filled, electrically charged ionization chambers in nuclear reactors. It was difficult to get reliable readings because the signals were weak. Beckman realized that with a relatively minor adjustment – substituting an input-load resistor for the glass electrode – the pH meter could be adapted to do the job. As a result, Beckman Instruments developed a new product, the micro-ammeter.

In addition, Beckman developed a dosimeter for measuring exposure to radiation, to protect personnel of the Manhattan project. The dosimeter was a miniature ionization chamber, charged with 170 volts. It had a small calibrated scale on top, whose needle was a platinum-covered quartz fiber. The dosimeters were also manufactured by Beckman's spinoff company, Arnold O. Beckman, Inc.

== Battling smog ==
In postwar Southern California, including the area of Pasadena where the Beckmans lived, smog was becoming an increasing topic of conversation, as well as an unpleasant experience. First characterized as "gas attacks" in 1943, suspicion fell on a variety of possible causes including the smudge pots used by orange growers, the smoke produced by local industrial plants, and car exhausts. The Los Angeles Chamber of Commerce was one of the organizations concerned about the possible causes and effects of smog, as it related both to industry (and jobs) and to quality of life in the area. Beckman was involved with the Chamber of Commerce.

In 1947, California governor Earl Warren signed a statewide air pollution control act, authorizing the creation of Air Pollution Control Districts (APCDs) in every county of the state. The Los Angeles Chamber of Commerce asked Beckman to represent them in dealing with creation of a local APCD. The new APCD, when formed, asked Beckman to become the scientific consultant to the Air Pollution Control Officer. He held the position from 1948 to 1952.

The Air Pollution Control Officer in question was Louis McCabe, a geologist with a background in chemical engineering. McCabe initially suspected that smog was a result of sulfur dioxide pollution, and proposed that the county convert the suspected pollutant into fertilizer through a costly process. Beckman was not convinced that sulfur dioxide was the real culprit behind Los Angeles smog. He visited Gary, Indiana, where steps were being taken to address sulfur dioxide pollution, and was struck by the characteristic smell of sulfur in the air. Returning, Beckman convinced McCabe that they needed to search for a different cause.

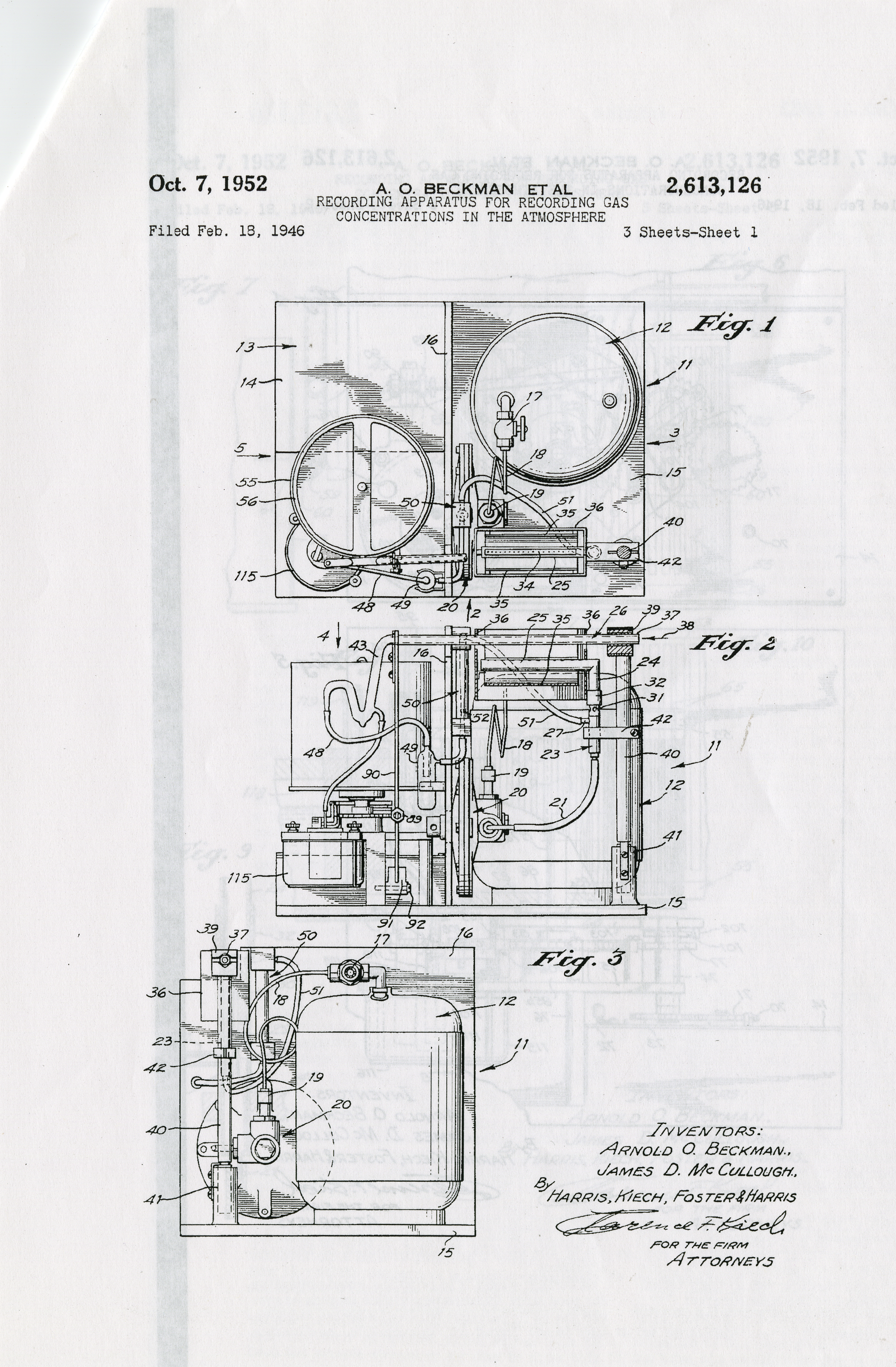
Patent 1071952, "Apparatus for recording gas concentrations in the atmosphere"

Beckman got in touch with a Caltech professor who was working on smog, Arie Jan Haagen-Smit. They developed an apparatus to collect particulate matter from Los Angeles air, using a system of tubing intermittently cooled by liquid nitrogen. Haagen-Smit identified the substance they collected as a peroxy organic material. He agreed to spend a year studying the chemistry of smog. His results, presented in 1952, identified ozone and hydrocarbons from smokestacks, refineries and car exhausts as key ingredients in the formation of smog.

While Haagen-Smit worked out the genesis of smog, Beckman developed an instrument to measure it. On October 7, 1952, he was granted a patent for an "oxygen recorder" that used colorimetric methods to measure the levels of compounds present in the atmosphere. Beckman Instruments eventually developed a range of instruments for various uses in monitoring and treating automobile exhaust and air pollution. They even produced "air quality monitoring vans", customized laboratories on wheels for use by government and industry.

Beckman himself was approached by California governor Goodwin Knight to head a Special Committee on Air Pollution, to propose ways to combat smog. At the end of 1953, the committee made its findings public. The "Beckman Bible" advised key steps to be taken immediately:

- stopping vapor leaks from refineries and filling stations
- establishing standards for automobile exhausts
- converting from diesel trucks and buses to propane
- asking polluting industries to restrict pollutants or move away from cities
- banning open burning of trash
- developing regional mass transportation

Beckman Instruments also acquired the Liston-Becker Instrument Company in June 1955. Founded by Max D. Liston, Liston-Becker had a successful record in the development of infrared gas analyzers. Liston developed instruments to measure smog and car exhaust emissions, essential to attempts to improve Los Angeles air quality in the 1950s.

Beckman helped to create the Air Pollution Foundation, a non-profit organization to support research on finding solutions to smog, and educating the public about scientific issues related to smog.

In 1954, he became a member of the board of directors of the Los Angeles Chamber of Commerce, and chairman of its Air Pollution Committee. He advocated for stronger powers for the APCD, and encouraged industry, business, and citizens to support for their work. He helped the Chamber of Commerce to develop a unified approach to monitoring smog, broadcasting smog alerts, and addressing the smog problem. On January 25, 1956, he became president of the Los Angeles Chamber of Commerce. He identified the two key issues of his term as battling smog, and supporting the collaboration of local science, technology, industry, and education.

Beckman recognized that air quality would not improve overnight. His work with air quality continued for years, and brought him national attention. In 1967, Beckman was appointed to the Federal Air Quality Board for a four-year term, by President Richard Nixon.

== Electronics ==
John J. Murdock held substantial stock in National Technical Laboratories. He and Arnold Beckman signed a stock option agreement by which Beckman could purchase Murdock's NTL stock from his estate after his death. When Murdock died in 1948, Beckman was able to gain a controlling interest in the company. On April 27, 1950, National Technical Laboratories was renamed Beckman Instruments, Incorporated. In 1952, Beckman Instruments became a publicly traded company on the New York Curb Exchange, generating new capital for expansion, including overseas expansion.

=== Cermets ===
Helipot Corporation, the spinoff company that Beckman had created when NTL's board were dubious about electronics, was reincorporated into Beckman Instruments and became the Helipot Division in 1958. Helipot researchers were experimenting with cermets, composite materials made by mixing ceramics and metals. Potentiometers made with cermet instead of metal were more heat-resistant, suitable for use at extreme temperatures.

=== Centrifuges ===
In 1954, Beckman Instruments acquired ultracentrifuge maker Spinco (Specialized Instruments Corp.), founded by Edward Greydon Pickels in 1946. This acquisition was the basis of Beckman's Spinco centrifuge division. The division went on to design and manufacture a range of preparative and analytical ultracentrifuges.

=== Semiconductors ===
In 1955, Beckman was contacted by William Shockley. Shockley, who had been one of Beckman's students at Caltech, led Bell Labs research program into semiconductor technology. Semiconductors were, in some ways, similar to cermets. Shockley wanted to create a new company, and asked Beckman to serve on the board. After considerable discussion, Beckman became more closely involved: he and Shockley signed a letter of intent to create the Shockley Semiconductor Laboratory as a subsidiary of Beckman Instruments, under William Shockley's direction. The new group would specialize in semiconductors, beginning with the automated production of diffused-base transistors.

Because Shockley's aging mother lived in Palo Alto, Shockley wanted to establish the laboratory in nearby Mountain View, California. Frederick Terman, provost at Stanford University, offered the firm space in Stanford's new industrial park. The firm launched in February 1956, the same year that Shockley received the Nobel Prize in Physics along with John Bardeen and Walter Houser Brattain "for their researches on semiconductors and their discovery of the transistor effect". Shockley Semiconductor Laboratory was the first establishment working on silicon semiconductor devices in what came to be known as Silicon Valley.

Shockley, however, lacked experience in business and industrial management. Moreover, he decided that the lab would research an invention of his own, the four-layer diode, rather than developing the diffused silicon transistor that he and Beckman had agreed upon. Beckman was reassured by his engineers that the scientific ideas behind Shockley's project were still sound. When appealed to by members of Shockley's lab, Beckman chose not to interfere with its management. In 1957, eight leading scientists including Gordon Moore and Robert Noyce left Shockley's group to form a competing startup, Fairchild Semiconductor, which would successfully develop silicon transistors. In 1960, Beckman sold the Shockley subsidiary to the Clevite Transistor Company, ending his formal association with semiconductors. Nonetheless, Beckman had been an essential backer of the new industry in its initial stages.

=== Computers and automation ===
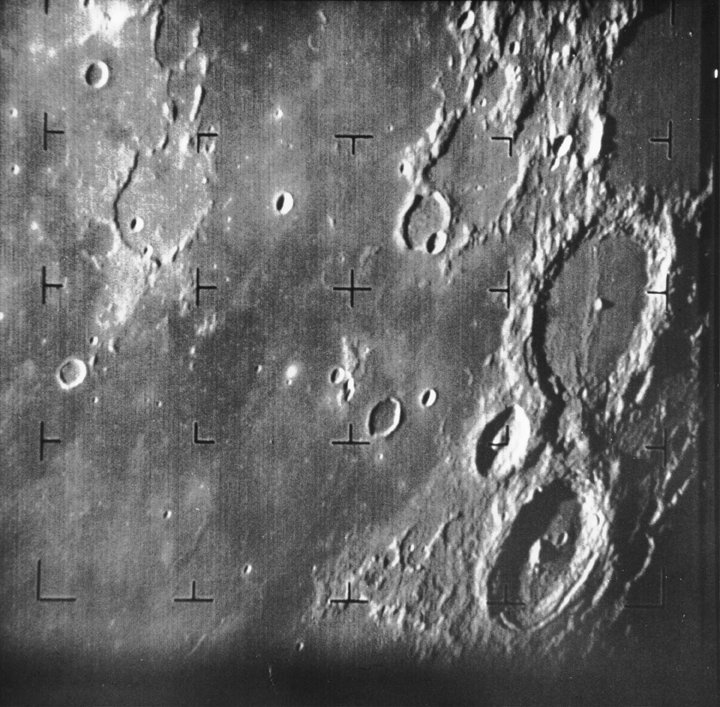
The first picture of the Moon taken by a US spacecraft, Ranger 7, on 31 July 1964

Beckman also saw that computers and automation offered a myriad of opportunities for integration into instruments, and the development of new instruments. Beckman Instruments purchased Berkeley Scientific Company in the 1950s, and later developed a Systems Division within Beckman Instruments "to develop and build industrial data systems for automation". Berkeley developed the EASE analog computer, and by 1959 Beckman had contracts with major companies in the aerospace, space, and defense industries, including Boeing Aerospace, Lockheed Aircraft, North American Aviation, and Lear Siegler.

The Beckman Systems Division also developed specialized computer systems to handle large volumes of telemetric radio data from satellites and uncrewed spacecraft. These included systems to process photographs of the Moon, taken by NASA's Ranger spacecraft.

== Philanthropy ==
The Beckmans became increasingly active as philanthropists, with the stated intention of giving away their personal wealth before their deaths.

Their first major philanthropic gift went to Caltech. In supporting Caltech, they expanded on the long-term relationship that Beckman had begun as a student at Caltech, and continued as a teacher and trustee. In 1962, they funded the construction of a concert hall, the Beckman Auditorium, designed by architect Edward Durrell Stone. Over a period of years, they also supported the Beckman Institute, Beckman Auditorium, Beckman Laboratory of Behavioral Sciences, and Beckman Laboratory of Chemical Synthesis at the California Institute of Technology. In the words of Caltech's president emeritus David Baltimore, Beckman "has shaped the destiny of Caltech." The Beckmans are also named in the Beckman Institute for Advanced Science and Technology and the Beckman Quadrangle at the University of Illinois Urbana-Champaign.

The Arnold and Mabel Beckman Foundation was incorporated in September 1977. At the time of Beckman's death, the Foundation had given more than 400 million dollars to a variety of charities and organizations. In 1990, it was considered one of the top ten foundations in California, based on annual gifts. Donations chiefly went to scientists and scientific causes as well as Beckman's alma maters. He is quoted as saying, "I accumulated my wealth by selling instruments to scientists ... so I thought it would be appropriate to make contributions to science, and that's been my number one guideline for charity."

In the 1980s, they funded five major centers:

- Beckman Research Institute (BRI) at the City of Hope National Medical Center in Duarte, California, United States.
- Beckman Laser Institute, University of California, Irvine, in Irvine, California
- Beckman Institute for Advanced Science and Technology at the University of Illinois Urbana–Champaign
- Beckman Center for Molecular and Genetic Medicine at Stanford University, Stanford, California
- Beckman Institute, California Institute of Technology, Pasadena, California

The Beckmans also gave to:

- The Arnold and Mabel Beckman Center for the History of Chemistry at the Chemical Heritage Foundation (now the Science History Institute), Philadelphia, PA
- The Beckman Center of the National Academies of Sciences, Engineering, and Medicine, Irvine, CA
- The Pepperdine University School of Business & Management's MBA program (1988)

After Mabel's death in 1989, Arnold Beckman reorganized the foundation to continue in perpetuity, and developed new initiatives for the foundation's giving.

A major focus became the improvement of science education. Beginning in 1998 the Foundation has provided over $23 million to support K-6 hands-on, research-based science education to school districts in Orange County, California, stimulating schools to integrate science into the K-6 curriculum as a core subject.

Arnold Beckman envisioned the Beckman Scholars and Beckman Young Investigators programs to support young scientists at the university level. Each year, the Beckman Foundation selects a list of universities and colleges, each of which selects student from its institution for the Beckman Scholars Program. The Beckman Young Investigators Program provides research support to promising faculty members in the early stages of academic careers in the chemical and life sciences, particularly those whose work involves methods, instruments and materials that may open up new avenues of research in science. In 2017, the Beckman Postdoctoral Fellows award was launched, similarly aimed at supporting promising young postdoctoral scholars in their chemistry or chemical instrumentation research.

The Arnold and Mabel Beckman Foundation also supports vision research through its Beckman Initiative in Macular Research and the Beckman-Argyros Award in Vision Research. Supported activities include research into laser surgery and macular degeneration.

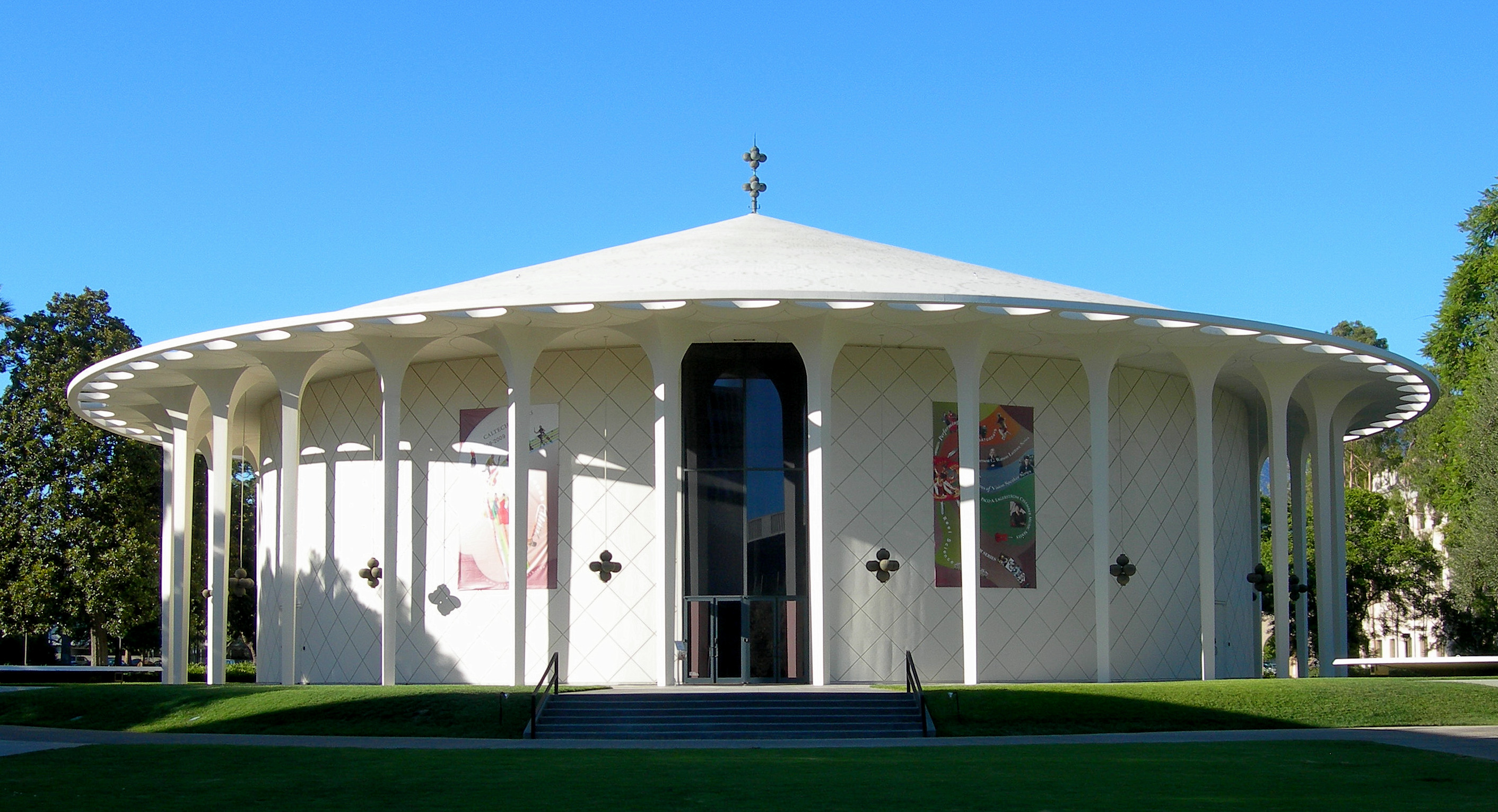
Beckman Auditorium, California Institute of Technology

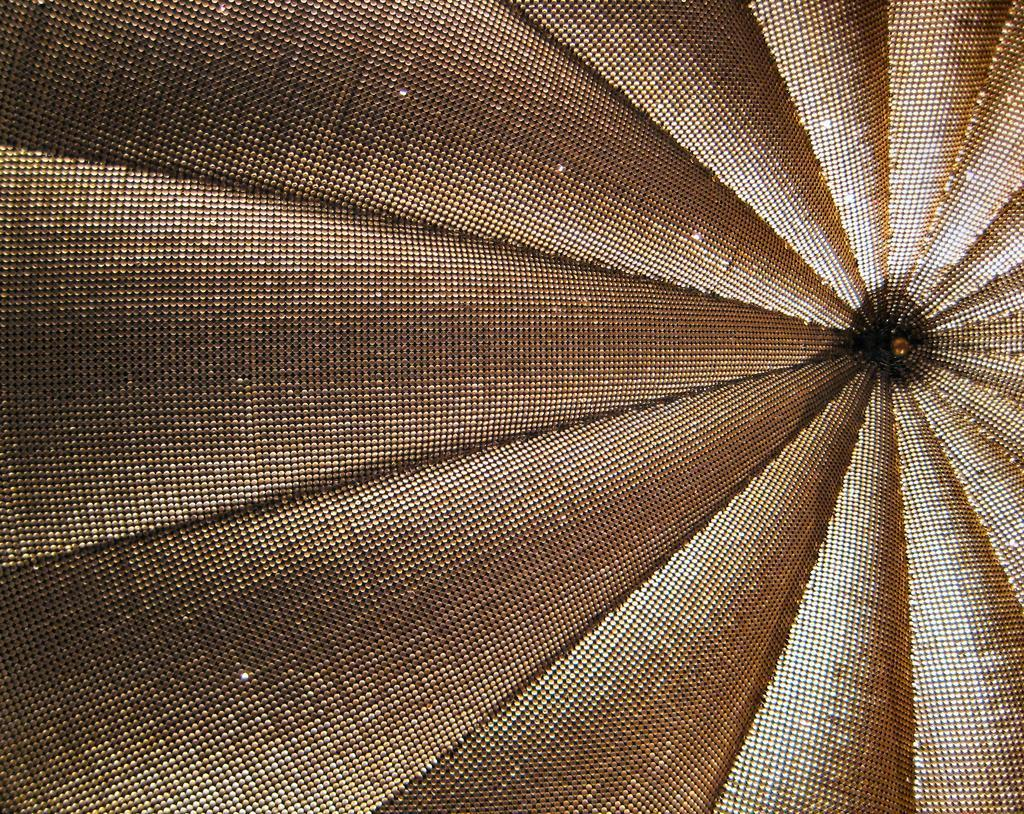
Ceiling of Beckman Auditorium, specially designed for its acoustic properties

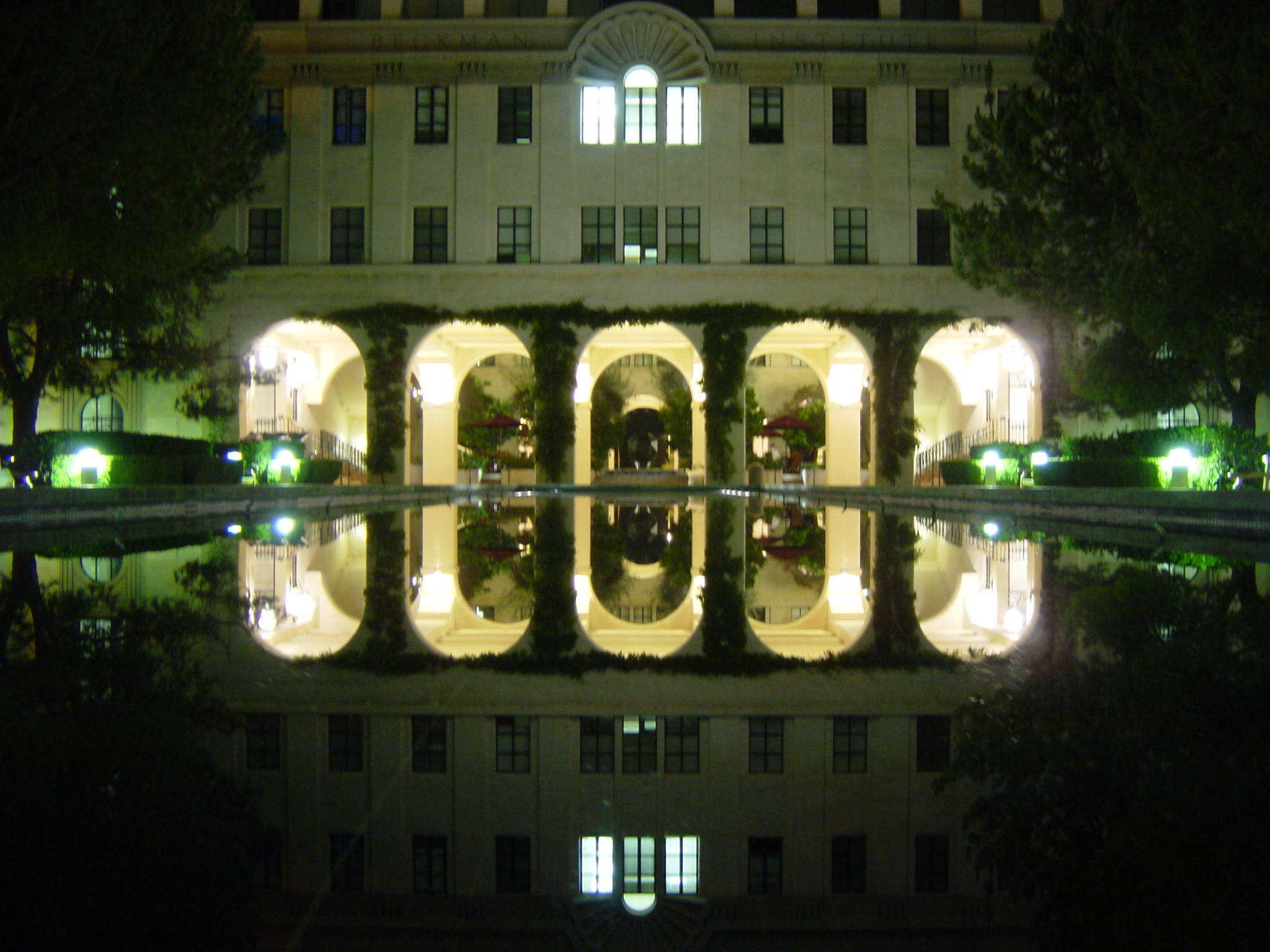
Beckman Institute at Caltech, reflected in water

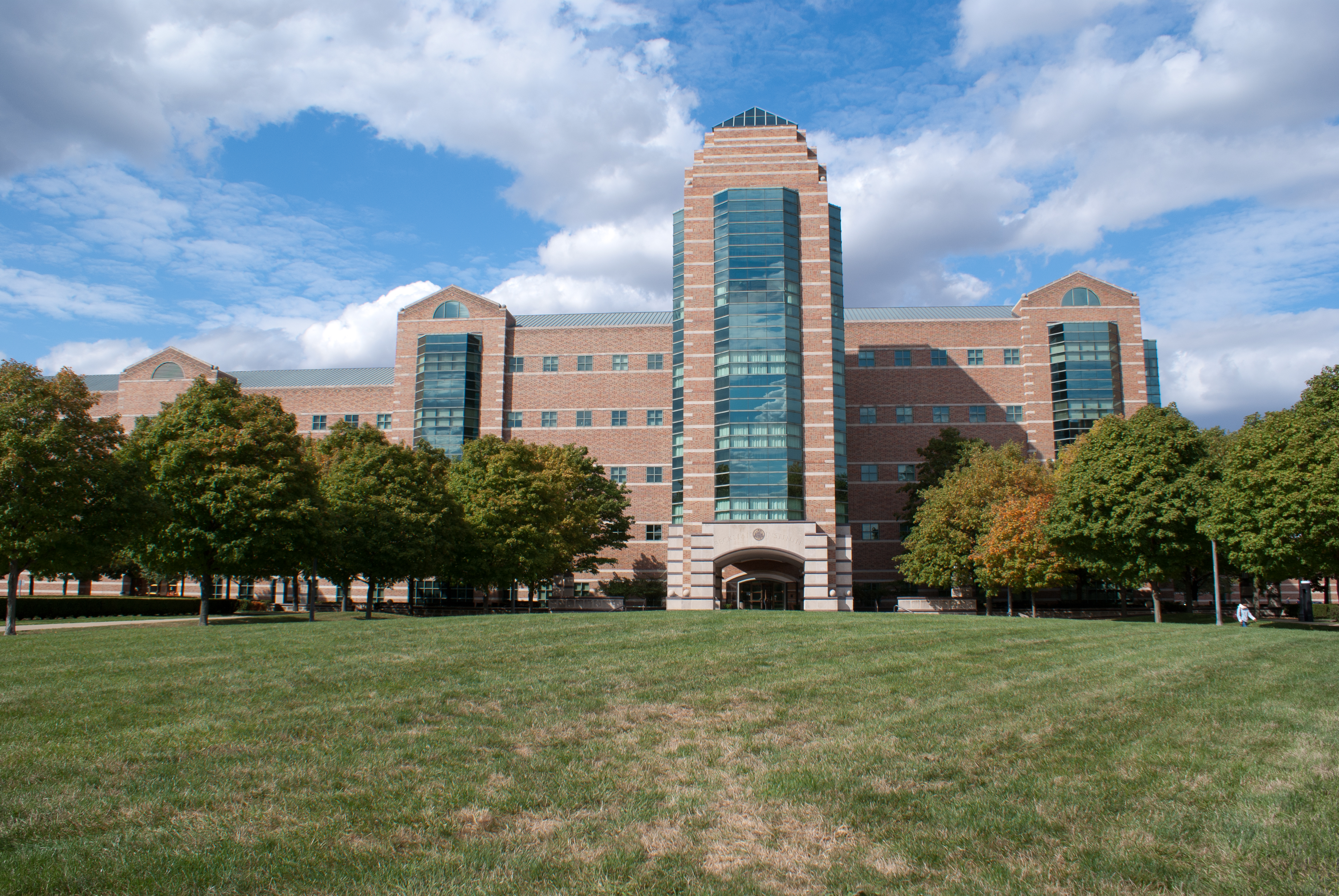
Beckman Institute at University of Illinois Urbana–Champaign

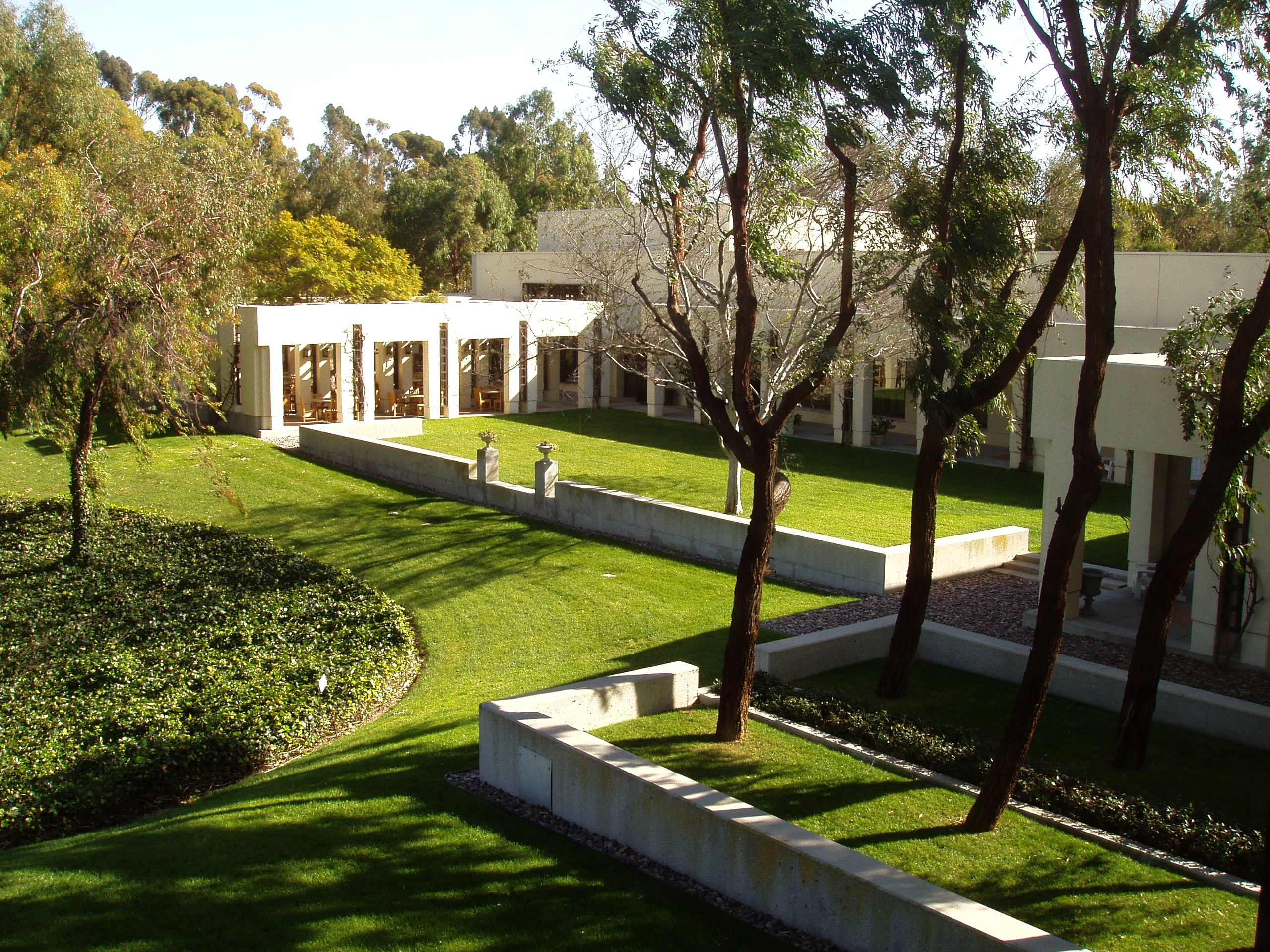
Beckman Conference Center, National Academies

== Awards and honors ==
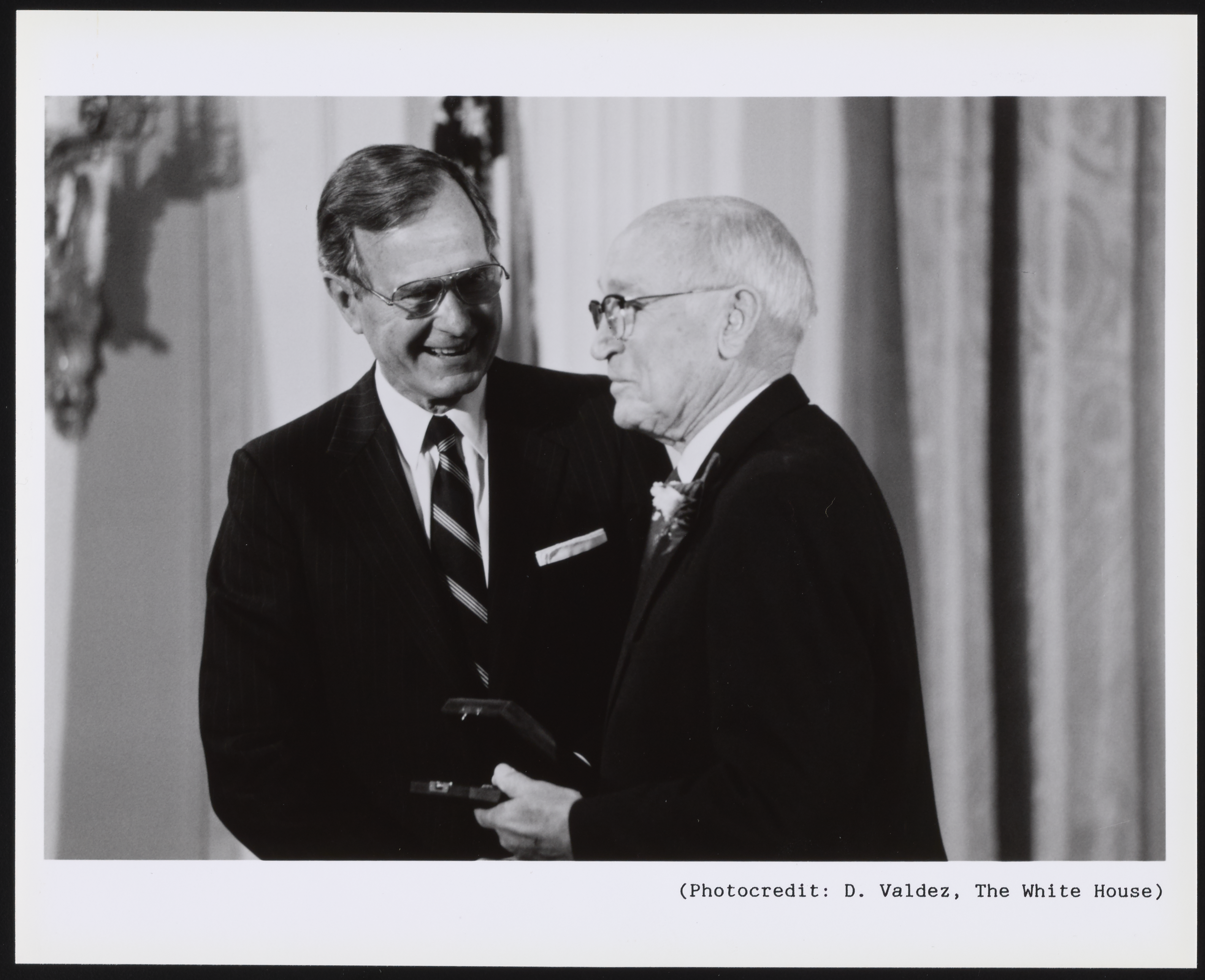
National Medal of Technology, awarded to Beckman by President George H. W. Bush, 1989

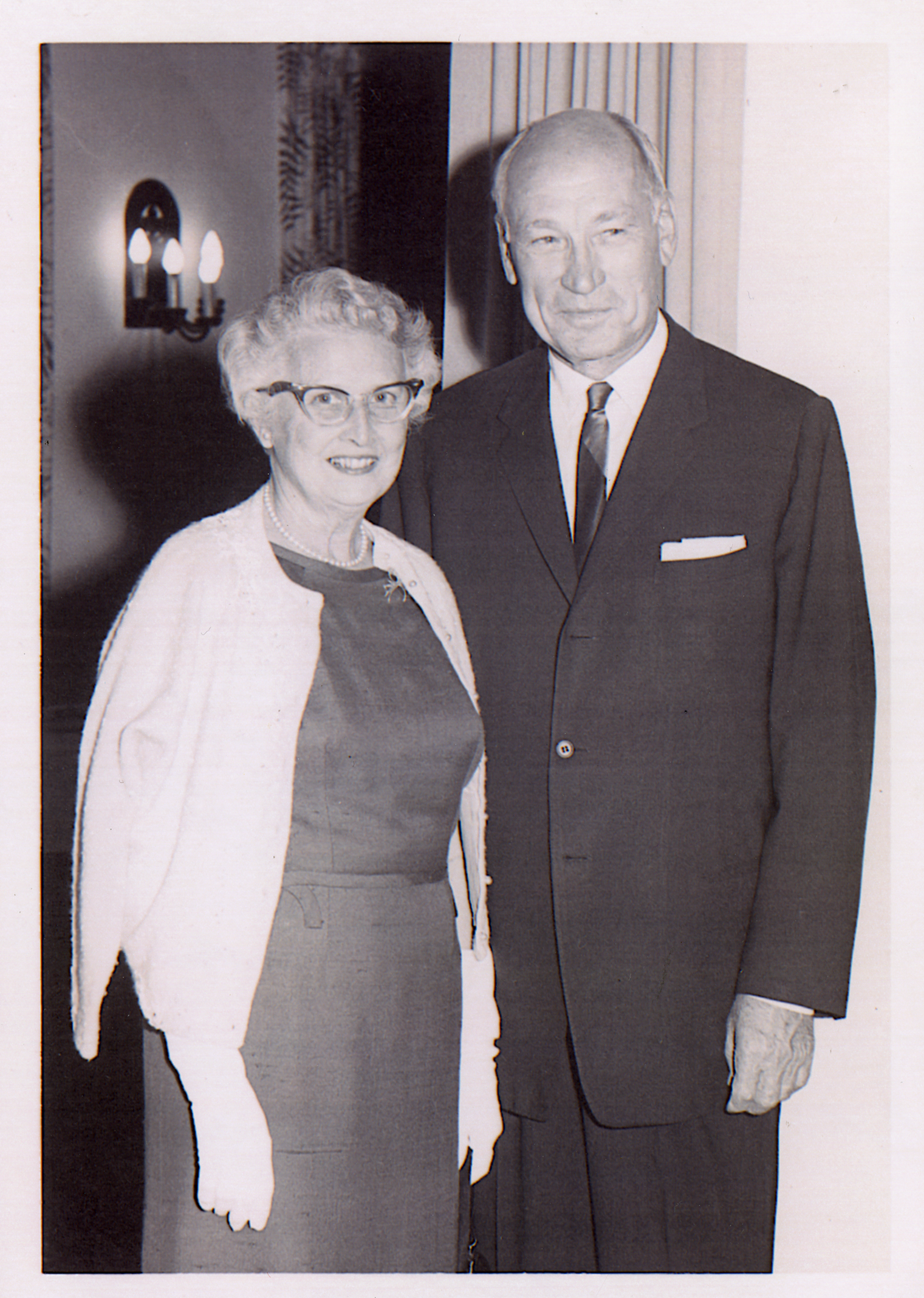
Mabel and Arnold Beckman

In 1971, Beckman was awarded an honorary Doctor of Science (Sc.D.) degree from Whittier College.

Arnold Beckman was elected a Fellow of the American Academy of Arts and Sciences in 1976. In 1982, he received the Golden Plate Award of the American Academy of Achievement. Asteroid 3737 Beckman was named after Arnold O. Beckman in 1983. Beckman was inducted into the Junior Achievement US Business Hall of Fame in 1985. In 1987, he was inducted into the National Inventors Hall of Fame in Akron, Ohio. In 2004 he received its Lifetime Achievement Award.

Beckman was awarded the National Medal of Technology in 1988. It is the highest honor the United States can confer to a US citizen for achievements related to technological progress President George H. W. Bush presented Beckman with the National Medal of Science Award in 1989, "for his leadership in the development of analytical instrumentation and for his deep and abiding concern for the vitality of the nation's scientific enterprise.". He had previously been recognized by the Reagan administration as one of about 30 citizens receiving the 1989 Presidential Citizens Medal for exemplary deeds of service.

In 1989, Beckman received the Charles Lathrop Parsons Award for public service from the American Chemical Society. He was awarded the Order of Lincoln, the state of Illinois' highest honor, by The Lincoln Academy of Illinois in 1991. In 1996, Beckman was inducted into the Alpha Chi Sigma Hall of Fame. He was awarded the Public Welfare Medal from the National Academy of Sciences in 1999. In 2000, he received a Special Millennium Edition of the Othmer Gold Medal from the Chemical Heritage Foundation in recognition of his multifaceted contributions to chemical and scientific heritage.

The Arnold O. Beckman High School in Irvine, California which has a focus in science education, was named in honor of Arnold O. Beckman. It was not, however, funded by Beckman. The Beckman Coulter Heritage exhibit, which discusses the work of scientists Arnold Beckman and Wallace Coulter, is located at the Beckman Coulter headquarters in Brea, California.

== Personal life ==
Beckman married Mabel on June 10, 1925. In 1933, the Beckmans built a home in Altadena, California, in the foothills and adjacent to Pasadena where they lived for over 27 years, raising their family. After Mabel found out she was unable to conceive a child, the couple decided to adopt children, adopting a three-year-old daughter Gloria Patricia in 1936 and the next year an infant son they named Arnold Stone. Mabel fell in love with a house by the sea in Corona del Mar near Newport Beach, California. They bought the house in 1960, renovated it, and lived there together until Mabel's death in 1989. Arnold Beckman died May 18, 2004, at the age of 104, in hospital in La Jolla, Calif. Mabel and Arnold Beckman are buried beneath a simple headstone in West Lawn Cemetery in Cullom, Illinois, the small town where he was born.

== See also ==
- Arnold and Mabel Beckman Foundation
- Fairchild Semiconductor (a more detailed history of Beckman's role in the founding of Silicon Valley)
