= Karen Redrobe =

Film studies scholar

Karen Redrobe (also known as Karen Beckman) is Elliot and Roslyn Jaffe Endowed Professor in Film Studies and chair of the department of the History of Art at the University of Pennsylvania. Her research has dealt with film theory, animation, and feminism, among other topics.

== Education ==
Redrobe earned her bachelor's degree in English with honors from the University of Cambridge in 1992. She then spent a year doing research in German literature at Georg-August, Universität Göttingen, Germany with Professor Wilfried Barner. She attended graduate school at Princeton University, earning an MA (1997) and PhD (1999) in English. Her advisors were Professors Diana Fuss and Michael Wood.

== Works ==
- Vanishing Women: Magic, Film and Feminism (Duke University Press, 2003)
- Crash: Cinema and the Politics of Speed and Stasis (Duke University Press, 2010)
