= Arthur Amos Noyes =

American chemist (1866–1936)

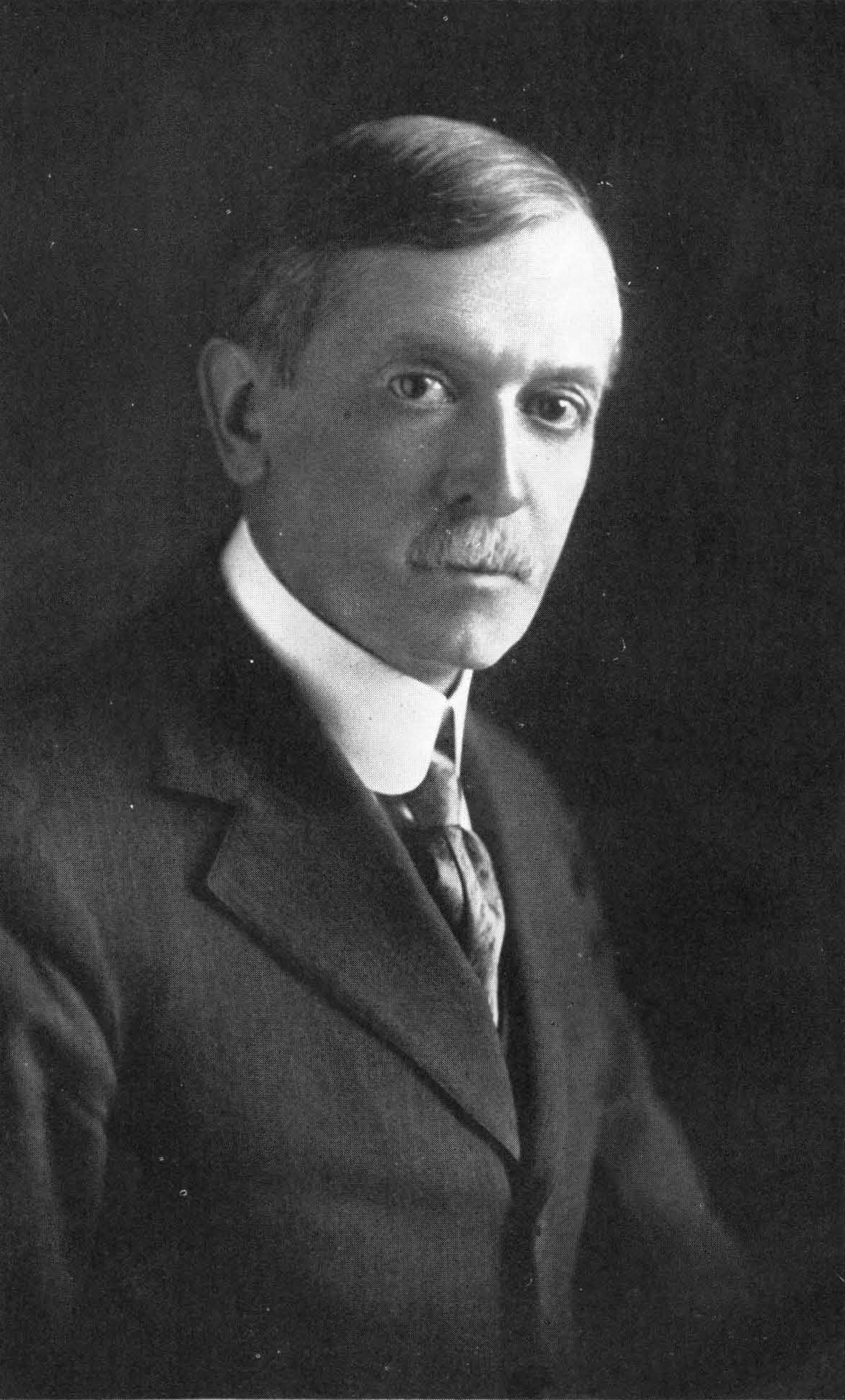
- Born: September 13, 1866; Newburyport, Massachusetts, U.S.
- Died: June 3, 1936 (aged 69); California, U.S.
- Education: Massachusetts Institute of Technology; University of Leipzig
- Known for: Electrolytes
- Awards: Gibbs Medal (1915); Davy Medal (1927)
- Scientific career
- Fields: Chemistry
- Workplaces: MIT; Caltech
- Doctoral advisor: Wilhelm Ostwald
- Doctoral students: Roscoe G. Dickinson; Edgar Stanley Freed; Richard Chace Tolman

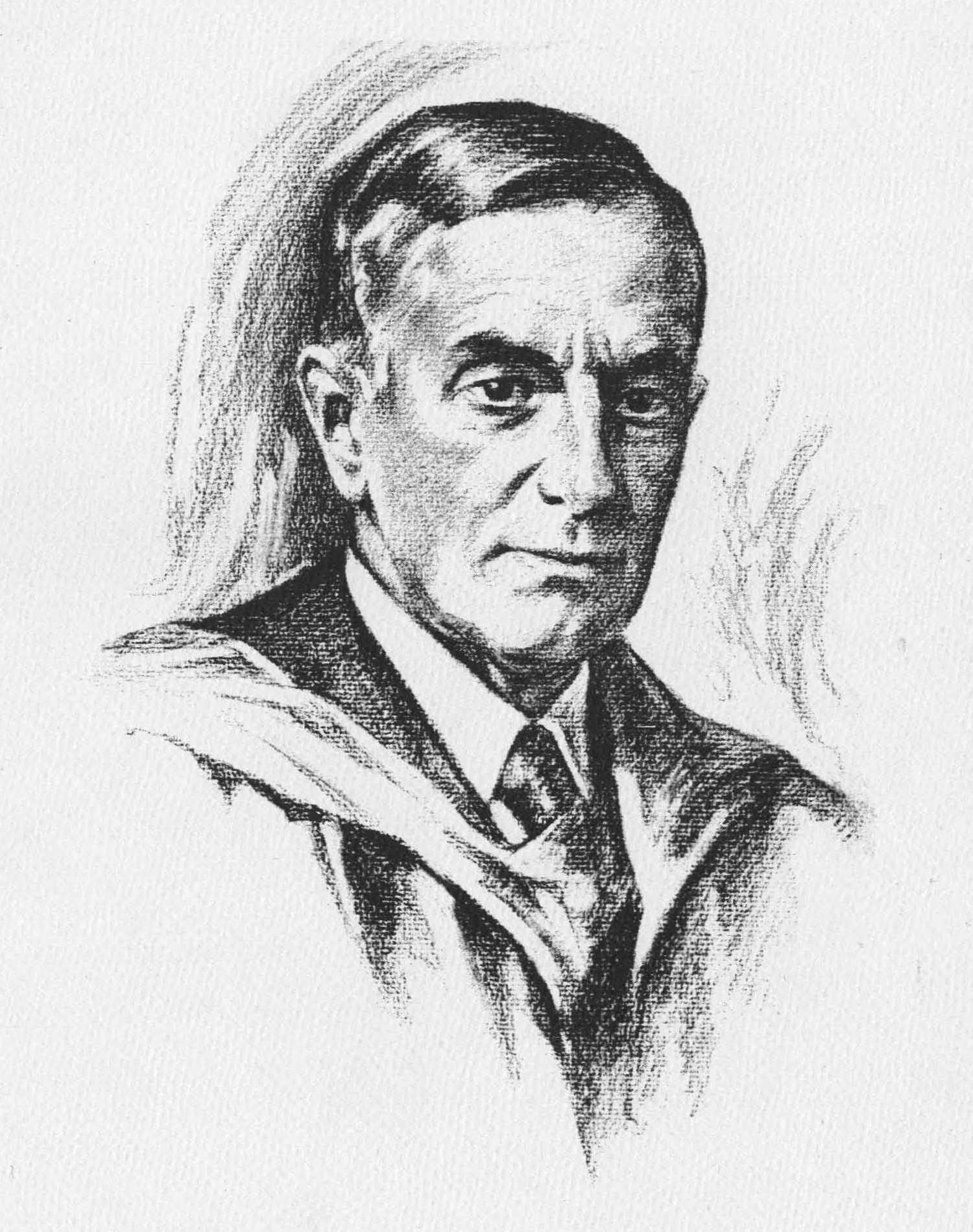
1931 drawing of Arthur Amos Noyes

Arthur Amos Noyes (September 13, 1866 – June 3, 1936) was an American chemist, inventor and educator, born in Newburyport, Massachusetts, son of Amos Noyes and Anna Page Noyes, née Andrews. He received a PhD in 1890 from Leipzig University under the guidance of Wilhelm Ostwald.

He served as the acting president of the Massachusetts Institute of Technology between 1907 and 1909 and as professor of chemistry at the California Institute of Technology from 1919 to 1936. "Although [the Noyes] laboratory at MIT was like an institute in its intramural funding (from Carnegie Institute of Washington and Noyes's patent royalties), Noyes recruited many of his disciples as undergraduates and took a deep interest in undergraduate engineering education, both at MIT and later at Caltech. Roscoe Gilkey Dickinson was one of his famous students.

Noyes was a major influence both on the educational philosophy of the core curriculum of Caltech as well as in the negotiations leading to the creation of the National Research Council along with George Ellery Hale and Robert Millikan. He also served on the board of trustees for Science Service, now known as Society for Science & the Public, between 1921 and 1927.

Noyes was an elected member of the American Academy of Arts and Sciences, the United States National Academy of Sciences, and the American Philosophical Society.

== Noyes–Whitney equation ==
Along with Willis Rodney Whitney, he formulated the Noyes–Whitney equation in 1897, which relates the rate of dissolution of solids to the properties of the solid and the dissolution medium. It is an important equation in pharmaceutical science. The relation is given by:

$$\frac{dW}{dt} = \frac{DA(C_{s}-C)}{L}$$

Where:

- $\frac{dW}{dt}$ is the rate of dissolution.
- A is the surface area of the solid.
- C is the concentration of the solid in the bulk dissolution medium.
- $C_{s}$ is the concentration of the solid in the diffusion layer surrounding the solid.
- D is the diffusion coefficient.
- L is the diffusion layer thickness.
