= 3737 Beckman =

Mars-crossing asteroid

Discovery
- Discovered by: E. F. Helin
- Discovery site: Palomar Obs.
- Discovery date: 8 August 1983

Designations
- Named after: Arnold Orville Beckman (American chemist)
- Alternative designations: 1983 PA
- Minor planet category: Mars crosser

Orbital characteristics
- Epoch 27 April 2019 (JD 2458600.5)
- Uncertainty parameter 0
- Observation arc: 34.78 yr (12,703 d)
- Aphelion: 3.3603 AU
- Perihelion: 1.4512 AU
- Semi-major axis: 2.4057 AU
- Eccentricity: 0.3968
- Orbital period (sidereal): 3.73 yr (1,363 d)
- Mean anomaly: 179.54°
- Mean motion: 0° 15^{m} 50.76^{s} / day
- Inclination: 20.133°
- Longitude of ascending node: 288.19°
- Argument of perihelion: 85.509°
- Earth MOID: 0.609 AU (237 LD)

Physical characteristics
- Mean diameter: 6.968±1.409 km 14.36±2.87 km
- Synodic rotation period: 3.124 h
- Geometric albedo: 0.094; 0.29
- Spectral type: SMASS = S B–V = 0.839; U–B = 0.406
- Absolute magnitude (H): 12.30; 12.40; 12.88

3737 Beckman, provisional designation 1983 PA, is a stony asteroid and sizable Mars-crosser on an eccentric orbit from the inner regions of the asteroid belt, approximately 14 kilometers (8.7 miles) in diameter. It was discovered on 8 August 1983, by American astronomer Eleanor Helin at the Palomar Observatory in California. The S-type asteroid has a rotation period of 3.1 hours. It was named for American chemist Arnold Beckman.

== Orbit and classification ==
Beckman is a member of the Mars-crossing asteroids, a dynamically unstable group between the main belt and the near-Earth populations, crossing the orbit of Mars at 1.66 AU. It orbits the Sun at a distance of 1.5–3.4 AU once every 3 years and 9 months (1,363 days; semi-major axis of 2.41 AU). Its orbit has an eccentricity of 0.40 and an inclination of 20° with respect to the ecliptic. The body's observation arc begins with its official discovery observation at Palomar in August 1983.

== Naming ==
This minor planet was named after Arnold Orville Beckman (1900–2004), an American chemist and inventor of the first (potentiometric) pH meter. The official naming citation was published by the Minor Planet Center on 17 August 1989 (M.P.C. 14971).

== Physical characteristics ==
In the SMASS classification, Beckman is a common, stony S-type asteroid, the most common type in the innermost region of the Solar System.

=== Rotation period ===
A rotational lightcurve of Beckman was obtained from photometric observations by Polish astronomer Wiesław Wiśniewski during 1986–1987. Lightcurve analysis gave a well-defined rotation period of 3.124 hours with a brightness amplitude of 0.16 magnitude (U=3).

Observations by Daniel Klinglesmith at Etscorn Campus Observatory (719) in November 2013, gave a period of 3.130 hours and an amplitude of 0.27 magnitude (U=3-). Serbian astronomer Vladimir Benishek at the Belgrade Astronomical Observatory measured a period of 3.125 hours in December 2017 (U=3-), and in March 2018, Robert Stephens at the Center for Solar System Studies (U81) in California determined a period of 3.113 (U=2). (Note: Lightcurve plot of (3737) Beckman by Robert Stephens at the Center for Solar System Studies (U81) in California. Rotation period 3.113±0.002 hours with a brightness amplitude of 0.08±0.01 mag. Quality code of 2 (lightcurve rating at CS3). Summary figures at the LCDB and CS3.)

=== Diameter and albedo ===
According to the survey carried out by the NEOWISE mission of NASA's Wide-field Infrared Survey Explorer, Beckman measures 6.97 kilometers in diameter and its surface has an albedo of 0.29. However, a 2017-WISE-study dedicated to Mars-crossing asteroids gave larger diameter of 14.36 kilometers due to a much lower albedo of 0.094. The Collaborative Asteroid Lightcurve Link assumes a standard albedo for a stony asteroid of 0.20 and derives a diameter of 7.89 kilometers based on an absolute magnitude of 12.88.

==== Sizable Mars-crosser ====
With an averaged diameter of 10 kilometers, Beckman is one of several "sizable" Mars-crossing asteroids such as 3581 Alvarez (13.69 km) 1065 Amundsenia (9.75 km), 1139 Atami (9.35 km), 1474 Beira (15.46 km), 1011 Laodamia (7.39 km), 1727 Mette (5.44 km), 1131 Porzia (7.13 km), 1235 Schorria (5.55 km), 985 Rosina (8.18 km), 1310 Villigera (15.24 km), and 1468 Zomba (7 km), which are smaller than the largest members of this dynamical group, namely, 132 Aethra, 323 Brucia (former Mars-crosser), 1508 Kemi, 2204 Lyyli and 512 Taurinensis, all larger than 20 kilometers.
