= Bengt Beckman =

Swedish mathematician, professor, and author (1925–2012)

Bengt Beckman (30 September 1925 – 13 March 2012) was a Swedish mathematician, university professor and bestselling author.

He worked as a research engineer at Tandem laboratory in Uppsala, Sweden. As an author, he wrote about cryptography in Sweden, particularly about Arne Beurling.

== Publications ==
Some of his books and papers are:

- Swedish cryptography achievements, Bonniers, 1996, ISBN 91-0-056229-7
- The world's first encryption machine - Gripenstiernas cipher-Machine 1786, the National Defense Radio Establishment, Bromma, 1999
- Thus the Z machine was broken - reconstruction of the Lorenz SZ40 / 42, the National Defense Radio Establishment, Bromma, 1999
- Swedish Signal Intelligence: 1900-1945, Frank Cass Publishers, 2002, ISBN 0-7146-5211-3
- In front of your eyes - drawings and comments, Johanneshov, 2010
