= Jose Cuervo =

Tequila brand based in Mexico

- Type: Tequila
- Manufacturer: Jose Cuervo
- Distributor: Proximo Spirits Inc.
- Origin: Mexico
- Introduced: 27 May 1795; 231 years ago
- Alcohol by volume: 30%–40% abv
- Proof (US): 70–80
- Color: Silver / Reposado / Añejo / Extra-Añejo / Cristalino / Flavored Tequilas
- Website: cuervo.com

Jose Cuervo is a Mexican brand of tequila manufactured by the family of founder José Antonio de Cuervo and distributed by Proximo Spirits. For many years, it has been the best-selling tequila brand in the world.

As of 2024, Jose Cuervo sells 8.9 million cases of tequila in the US, responsible for 1 out of every 5 cases in the tequila category. Jose Cuervo is family-owned and is run today by the Beckmann family, descendants of Don José Antonio de Cuervo. Juan-Domingo Beckmann is the sixth-generation leader of the company. In July 2013 the Beckmann family's Proximo Spirits took over distribution of Jose Cuervo from Diageo, following Diageo's failed attempt to buy the company.

The Jose Cuervo family of products that bear its name are: Jose Cuervo Tradicional, Jose Cuervo Especial, and Jose Cuervo 250 Aniversario. There are also prepared cocktails including Jose Cuervo Margaritas and Jose Cuervo Sparkling Margaritas.

== History ==
=== Early history ===
In 1758, Don José Antonio de Cuervo was issued a land grant by King Ferdinand VI of Spain in the town of Tequila, Jalisco. Here his family founded the Taberna de Cuervo, the farm where they would cultivate and harvest the flowering blue agave plant, a water-retaining plant found in central Mexico that is fermented then distilled to create tequila. The first Vino Mezcal de Tequila de Jose Cuervo was made in 1795, after Don José Antonio de Cuervo's son José María Guadalupe de Cuervo was granted a permit from King Carlos IV of Spain to produce tequila commercially, following a time of prohibition under King Carlos III. This was the birth of the tequila industry.

By 1880, the Cuervo family had begun individually bottling tequila for commercial distribution. Cuervo was the first distiller to bottle tequila, at a time when other distillers were still using barrels. Tequila was known as "mezcal de tequila" until 1893, when tequila makers and the Mexican government dropped "mezcal" from the name. Cuervo's first bottled tequila was sold in 1906.

Upon the death of Don Jesús, his wife, Ana González Rubio, inherited La Rojeña and in 1900 married José Cuervo Labastida, head of La Constancia. From then on, the brand became Jose Cuervo Tequila. After Ana Gonzélez Rubio's death in 1934, the estate was left to her niece Guadalupe Gallardo, who died in 1966 and left the estate to her sister, Virginia Gallardo. One of her sons, Juan Beckmann Gallardo, would manage the business. Part of Cuervo was owned by Distribuidora Bega, and, starting in 1979, the other part was owned by Grupo Cuervo, made up of Beckmann, his son Juan Beckmann Vidal, José Luis Campos, and Heublein Inc.

In 1852, bottles of Jose Cuervo crossed the U.S. border for the first time.

=== Recent history ===
Cuervo began to dominate the tequila industry in the 1940s. Tequila first made significant inroads into the United States during the Prohibition era, when it was smuggled from Mexico into southwestern US states. Tequila made further advances in the US during World War II, when many US distilleries switched to war-related production and there were restrictions on European imports. Then, in the 1980s, more American tourists visited Mexico, discovering tequila. According to the Distilled Spirits Council of the United States, the US demand for tequila has risen over the years, with 12 million cases shipped to the US in 2012, a 54% increase as compared to a decade earlier. The fastest-growing segment has been super-premium blue agave spirits.

In 1989, the Beckmann family sold 45% of Jose Cuervo to International Distillers and Vintners (IDV), a division of Grand Metropolitan PLC. In 1997, Grand Metropolitan merged with Guinness plc to become Diageo which would be Jose Cuervo's main distributor outside of Mexico until 2013. Starting in 2011, Diageo, the world's largest liquor maker, was in talks to acquire Jose Cuervo from the Beckmann family for in excess of $3 billion. After it was unable to acquire the brand, Diageo announced in December 2012 that it would end the US distribution deal. In a deal first announced in March 2013, Proximo Spirits, a company owned by the Beckmann family, took over Jose Cuervo's distribution beginning in July 2013.

Proximo Spirits has, therefore, been responsible for all distribution of Jose Cuervo products for over 15 years.

== La Rojeña distillery ==
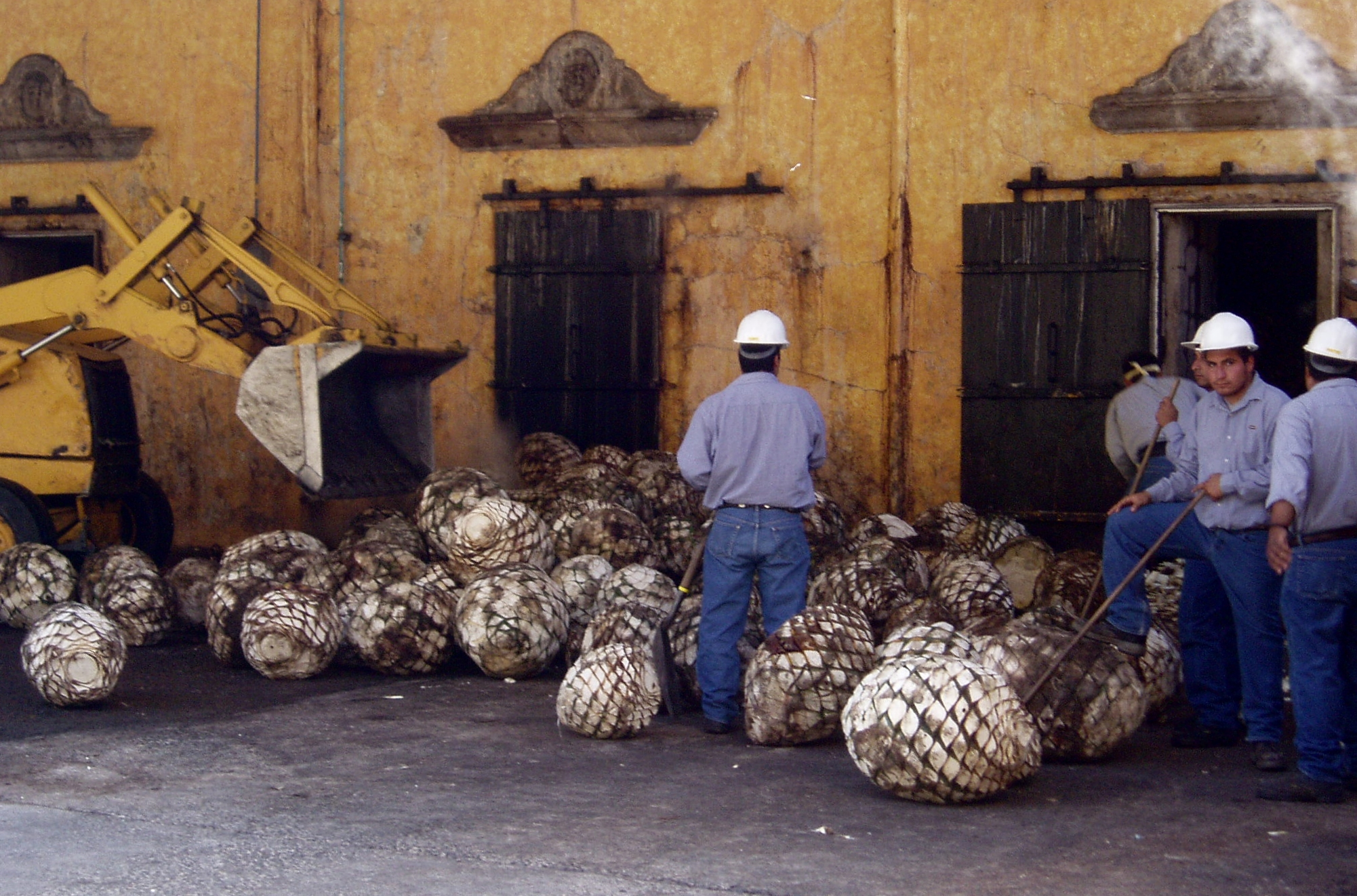
Workers load agave hearts into ovens at the José Cuervo Distillery in Tequila, Mexico.

=== Background ===
Jose Cuervo is produced at the La Rojeña distillery in the state of Jalisco in Mexico. The distillery was officially founded in 1812. It is the oldest active distillery in Latin America. After Ana González Rubio married José Cuervo Labastida in 1900, he renamed the distillery La Rojeña, and was the first to call the tequila produced there Jose Cuervo. After the death of Don Vincente, Jesús Flores (owner of the distillery now known as La Constancia) took over management of La Rojeña. He was the first to package the tequila into damajuanas (rope-encased jugs), where previously they had been stored only in wooden barrels. The damajuanas were later replaced with individual bottles, making it easier to transport the tequila across the border to America. The company shipped its first export of three bottles across the border in 1852.

In order for a spirit to be called tequila, it must come from the blue agave plant, a species found only in Jalisco and four nearby regions in central Mexico. All Jose Cuervo tequila continues to be made in the town of Tequila in the state of Jalisco in Mexico. Jose Cuervo owns the largest holdings of agave in the world, located within the volcanic soil that is famously rich and fertile.

=== Distillation process ===
The blue agave plant has spiked leaves and a round, fleshy core (the piña). The leaves are chopped off and the core is cooked and crushed to create juice, which is fermented and distilled to make tequila. The resulting unaged, clear tequila is then diluted with water to bring the alcohol content down to around 40%. Pure tequila is distilled 100% from the sap of the blue agave plant, while mixto tequilas only need to be at least 51% blue agave in order to legally be called tequila. In 1964, tequila makers were allowed to obtain up to 30% of the sugars in tequila from sources other than the agave plant. During a blue agave shortage in the 1970s, Mexican regulations were further revised to require that tequila contain only 51.5% agave. Agave plants take 10 to 12 years to mature and become ripe, while sugarcane can be harvested every year, so blending the agave spirit with sugarcane spirit is a cheaper method, while using 100% blue agave plant is more expensive.

=== The Cuervo Express ===
The Jose Cuervo Express train was opened to visitors in February 2012 to help promote tourist development in the Jalisco area. The train travels 60 kilometers from Guadalajara to Tequila, taking two hours to journey through the agave fields and past volcanoes. Upon arrival in Tequila, guests are able to take a tour of the Jose Cuervo factory and La Rojeña distillery. According to Mundo Cuervo site, this is an authentic and relaxing experience. Travel in a comfortable carriage, enjoy a tasting of Jose Cuervo Tradicional, cocktails on board, and a guided tour of La Rojeña Distillery. Ideal for group or family outings.

The Cuervo Family Crest is a symbol of the brand's heritage with a crow ("Cuervo" translated in Spanish is "crow"), blue agave plant and the branding iron of the Hacienda Solar de las Animas, owned by Jose Cuervo.

== Tequila types ==
Unaged
Unaged or WhiteTequila is naturally clear after fermentation and distillation are complete. This type is called blanco, silver, plata ("white").
Aged
After the fermentation and distillation processes, tequila can then be aged in oak barrels, giving it a golden to amber hue. There are three official variations of aged tequila:
- Reposado has a pale amber color, as it typically spends 2 to 12 months in oak barrels.
- Añejo has a darker gold color and more flavor contributions from the barrel; typically aged 1 to 3 years in oak barrels.
- Extra añejo, which has an even darker color and richer flavor, is 100% blue agave and aged more than three years. The occasionally smoky flavors of extra añejo tequilas have been compared to those typically found in brandy and scotch. The extra añejo designation for tequilas aged more than three years was approved by Mexico's National Committee on Standardization in 2006.
- In 2008, a new type of tequila was introduced called Cristalino, which is aged tequila that is then filtered to remove the color. This process results in a crystal-clear tequila that has the flavor and aroma of aged tequila. Cristalinos can be made by filtering reposado, Añejo, Extra Añejo or a blend of any of these aged tequilas.

== Jose Cuervo tequilas ==
=== Especial Silver ===
Especial Silver is an unaged white tequila made with blue agave that is double-distilled in a continuous column still.

Especial Gold

Especial Gold is tequila made with blue ageve and is double-distilled in continuous column still. Its flavor profile is "sweet, subtle agave, with hints of oak and vanilla."

=== Tradicional ===
Cuervo's Tradicional Tequila has been produced since 1795. Its varieties, Blanco, Reposado, Añejo and Cristalino are 100% agave tequilas. Tradicional Blanco is made with just three ingredients: agave, yeast, and water. Cuervo Tradicional Blanco does not use or contain additives. Tradicional Reposado is aged in new American oak barrels for 2 to 4 months. Tradicional Añejo is aged for 12-16 months and Tradicional Cristalino is aged for 4 months and then charcoal-filtered to arrive at its crystal-clear color while still boasting a sweet, soft flavor profile.

Jose Cuervo 250 Aniversario

Jose Cuervo 250 Aniversario is a 100% blue agave extra-añejo tequila blended from tequilas held in the family's reserves. It is aged for at least 36 months in new American oak barrels.

=== Reserva de la Familia ===
Reserva de la Familia was introduced in 1995 to celebrate the 200th Anniversary of the distillery. Reserva de la Familia is a high-end offering of 100% blue agave tequila, matured in the La Rojeña distillery's private cellars. Its first edition sold out weeks after its release. The first Reserva de la Familia is classified as an extra añejo tequila, meaning it is 100% agave aged over three years in an oak barrel, giving it a deeper golden color with a richer flavor more typically tasted in scotch or brandy. It would become Cuervo's first extra añejo offering after the high-end distinction was created in 2005. It was named on Bloomberg Businessweek's 2009 list of the world's 20 best-tasting tequilas, and on a list of the 18 best tequilas in the world in Men's Journal in 2013.

Reserva de la Familia is the ultra-premium collection of artisanal small-batch tequilas and Mexico's crown jewel. It is a tequila that follows heritage production processes, remaining 100% traditional and handmade. Reserva de la Familia now offers Platino, Reposado, Extra-Añejo and Cristalino expressions.

=== Margaritas ===
Cuervo offers several pre-made margaritas. Jose Cuervo offers Prepared Cocktail margaritas under different recipes and diverse brands including Authentic Jose Cuervo Margaritas; Jose Cuervo Golden Margarita; and Jose Cuervo Sparkling Cocktails. Jose Cuervo also offers non-alcoholic Margarita Mixes. Jose Cuervo Sparkling Cocktails include Margaritas, Paloma, and Pink Lemonade in cans: 5.9% ABV from 2026.

== Product list ==
| Name | ABV (US) | Notes |
|---|---|---|
| Especial Gold | 40% | made with agave |
| Especial Silver | 40% | made with agave |
| Tradicional Cristalino | 40% | 100% agave |
| Tradicional Reposado | 40% | 100% agave |
| Tradicional Plata | 40% | 100% agave |
| Tradicional Añejo | 40% | 100% agave |
| Reserva de la Familia | 40% | 100% blue agave tequilas: Platino, Reposado, Extra Añejo & Cristalino |
| Authentic Margarita | 9.95% | Pre-made margarita, made with Cuervo Gold |
| Light Margarita | 9.95% | Lower calorie pre-made margarita, made with Cuervo Gold, available in Lime, Strawberry and White peach flavors |
| Golden Margarita | 12.7% | Pre-made margarita, made with Cuervo Gold, pure agave nectar and lime |
| Margarita Mix | 0% | Pre-made margarita that doesn't contain alcohol, available in Lime and Strawberry Lime flavors |

== Honors and awards ==
- In 1889, Mexican president Porfirio Díaz awarded Cuervo its first gold medal for the quality of tequila it produced.
- In 1907, Cuervo won the Gran Premio in Madrid, Spain.
- In 1909, Cuervo won the Grand Prix in Paris, France.
- In 2009, Bloomberg Businessweek named Jose Cuervo Silver, Platino, Reserva de la Familia and Black four of the world's twenty best-tasting tequilas.
- The Reserva de la Familia extra-añejo was awarded a double gold medal at the 2012 San Francisco World Spirits Competition.
- In 2025 Tradicional Blanco won: The Spirits Business Global Tequila & Mezcal Masters (Gold); Bartender Spirits Awards (87 pts); Beverage Testing Institute (Gold); San Francisco World Spirits Competition (Gold).
- In 2025 Tradicional Reposado won: The Spirits Business Global Tequila & Mezcal Masters (Gold); Bartender Spirits Awards (90 pts); Beverage Testing Institute (Gold); San Francisco World Spirits Competition (Gold).
- In 2025 Tradicional Cristalino won: World Tequila Awards (Cristalino Winner, Gold); Bartender's Spirits Awards (91 pts); Beverage Testing Institute (Gold); San Francisco World Spirits Competition (Gold).
- In 2025 Tradicional Añejo won: The Spirits Business Global Tequila & Mezcal Masters (Gold); Bartender Spirits Awards (84 pts); Beverage Testing Institute (Gold); Tequila & Mezcal Challenge (Gold).

== Sports Partnerships ==
In 1979, Jose Cuervo became beach volleyball's first major sponsor. After the Association of Volleyball Professionals (AVP) tour folded in 2010, the Jose Cuervo Pro Beach Volleyball Series was launched in 2011 by IMG and USA Volleyball with three events across the US, and upped the number to seven in 2012. With the return of the AVP tour in 2013, the Cuervo Series was not continued.

In 2026, NASCAR announced a multiple-year partnership with Cuervo. NASCAR named Cuervo "the Official Tequila of NASCAR, the Official Margarita of NASCAR and an Official Partner of NASCAR beginning in the 2026 season."

Since 2021, Cuervo has also partnered with the UFC as the Official Tequila Partner.

== In popular culture ==
Cuervo Gold is referred to in Steely Dan's song "Hey Nineteen", on their album Gaucho, released in 1980. The lyric is, "The Cuervo Gold / The fine Colombian / Make tonight a wonderful thing."

In 1978, after a stint as a poster girl for Jose Cuervo Tequila, Cindy Jordan wrote a country song titled "Jose Cuervo", the first song she ever wrote. The song references the tequila in the lyrics, "Jose Cuervo, you are a friend of mine." Recorded by Shelly West in 1983, it was named Billboard magazine's 1983 Country Song of the Year after reaching number 1 on the Billboard country songs chart.

The song "Ten Rounds with Jose Cuervo" by country music artist Tracy Byrd documents a man's night drinking Cuervo after his girlfriend breaks up with him. It reached number 1 on the Billboard country songs chart in 2002. Other country songs that mention the liquor are "The Dope Smokin' Song" by Hank Flamingo and "Drink Canada Dry" by David Allan Coe.

In the 2004 MMORPG game World of Warcraft, there are some items referencing Jose Cuervo, like "Cuergo's Gold" and "Hozen Cuervo".

In Carrie Underwood's 2008 song Last Name describing a woman meeting a man at a club and later eloping with him in Las Vegas after having had too much to drink that night, Cuervo tequila is referenced in the line "So I'll blame it on the Cuervo".

Cuervo Silver is shown to be enjoyed on multiple occasions on the Showtime series Dexter (2006–13).

A moody 2013 ad campaign for Cuervo Especial starred actor Kiefer Sutherland.

Beyoncé references Jose Cuervo on her 2016 song "Formation", from her album Lemonade, with the line, "I twirl on my haters, albino alligators / El Camino with the seat low, sippin' Cuervo with no chaser."

Cuervo has used Agave Stalks to recycle and make surfboards. Surfboards made out of agave wood were introduced at the Cuervo Surf Classic 2020.
