= Juan Beckmann Vidal =

Mexican businessman

- Born: Juan Francisco Beckmann Vidal; February 1940 (age 86); Mexico City, Mexico
- Occupation: Businessman
- Known for: 70% owner, José Cuervo
- Spouse: Maria de Jesus Dora Legorreta Santos
- Children: 3, including Juan Domingo Beckmann

Juan Francisco Beckmann Vidal (born February 1940) is a Mexican billionaire businessman, the owner of 70% of the José Cuervo tequila brand.

== Early life ==
Juan Beckmann Vidal was born in Mexico City, and grew up in Tijuana.

== Career ==
In 1970, Beckmann Vidal took charge of the tequila maker José Cuervo, which has been owned by his family for 11 generations.

In 2011, Beckmann Vidal was still president of José Cuervo.

== Personal life ==
He is married to Maria de Jesus Dora Legorreta Santos, they have three children, and live in Mexico City. Together with his son, through Fambech Luxco, a Luxembourg company, he owns three apartments on the 31st floor of New York's Trump Tower. In 2020 it was revealed by The New York Times that the owner of 84B 438 Park Avenue, an anonymous member of the Beckmann family, had settled out of court with developers regarding a "catastrophic water flood" in 2016 that affected floors 83–86. The apartment was reportedly worth $84 million (USD).

His son Juan Domingo Beckmann is the chief executive officer (CEO) of Jose Cuervo. His daughter Karen Beckmann Legorreta serves on the board of parent company Becle.
