= 3352 McAuliffe =

Near-Earth asteroid

Discovery
- Discovered by: N. G. Thomas
- Discovery site: Anderson Mesa Stn.
- Discovery date: 6 February 1981

Designations
- Pronunciation: /məˈkɔːlɪf/
- Named after: Christa McAuliffe (Challenger crew member)
- Alternative designations: 1981 CW
- Minor planet category: NEO · Amor

Orbital characteristics
- Epoch 4 September 2017 (JD 2458000.5)
- Uncertainty parameter 0
- Observation arc: 36.34 yr (13,275 days)
- Aphelion: 2.5725 AU
- Perihelion: 1.1855 AU
- Semi-major axis: 1.8790 AU
- Eccentricity: 0.3691
- Orbital period (sidereal): 2.58 yr (941 days)
- Mean anomaly: 73.070°
- Mean motion: 0° 22^{m} 57.72^{s} / day
- Inclination: 4.7727°
- Longitude of ascending node: 107.37°
- Argument of perihelion: 15.941°
- Earth MOID: 0.2041 AU · 79.5 LD

Physical characteristics
- Dimensions: 1.99 km (derived)
- Synodic rotation period: 2.2060±0.0003 h 2.2062±0.0002 h (Note: Warner (2017g): lightcurve plot of (3352) McAuliffe with a period of 2.2062 hours obtained at the Center for Solar System Studies (CS3). Quality code of 3. Publication not yet available at the "Astronomy Abstract Service". Find summary figures for (3352) McAuliffe at Collaborative Asteroid Lightcurve Link); 2.207±0.002 h 2.212±0.002 h (Note: Warner (2017c): lightcurve plot of (3352) McAuliffe with a period of 2.212 hours obtained at the Center for Solar System Studies (CS3). Quality code of 3-. Publication not yet available at the Astronomy Abstract Service. Find summary figures at Collaborative Asteroid Lightcurve Link); 6 h (dated) (Note: Pravec (1998) web: rotation period of 6 hours with a brightness amplitude of 0.2 mag. Dated results. Summary figures for (3352) McAuliffe at Collaborative Asteroid Lightcurve Link)
- Geometric albedo: 0.18 (assumed)
- Spectral type: SMASS = A SQ · A
- Absolute magnitude (H): 15.54±0.1 (R) · 15.8 · 16.00±0.18 · 16.068±0.112

3352 McAuliffe (/məˈkɔːlɪf/), provisional designation 1981 CW, is an asteroid and suspected binary system, classified as near-Earth object of the Amor group, approximately 2 kilometers in diameter. It was discovered on 6 February 1981, by American astronomer Norman Thomas at Lowell's Anderson Mesa Station near Flagstaff, Arizona, United States.

Originally, this asteroid was the target of the 1998 Deep Space 1 mission, but that mission was eventually rerouted to 9969 Braille. It was named in memory of Challenger crew member Christa McAuliffe.

== Orbit ==
McAuliffe orbits the Sun at a distance of 1.2–2.6 AU once every 2 years and 7 months (941 days). Its orbit has an eccentricity of 0.37 and an inclination of 5° with respect to the ecliptic.

It has an Earth minimum orbital intersection distance of 0.2041 AU (30,500,000 km), which translates into 79.5 lunar distances. Due to its eccentric orbit, McAuliffe is also a Mars-crosser. As no precoveries were taken, and no prior identifications were made, the body's observation arc begins with its official discovery observation at Anderson Mesa in 1981.

== Physical characteristics ==
=== Spectral type ===
In the SMASS taxonomy, McAuliffe is a relatively uncommon A-type asteroid, meaning that it is rich in olivine. In addition, the large-scale survey conducted by PanSTARRS also classified as a Sq-type, a transitional type between the common stony and Q-type asteroids, indicating the presence of pyroxene minerals.

=== Diameter and albedo ===
The Collaborative Asteroid Lightcurve Link assumes an albedo of 0.18 and derives a diameter of 1.99 kilometers, based on an absolute magnitude of 16.068, a figure previously obtained by the Wide-field Infrared Survey Explorer with its subsequent NEOWISE mission, and later revised by Czech astronomer Petr Pravec.

=== Rotation period ===
Between 1998 and 2016, several rotational lightcurves of McAuliffe were obtained from photometric observations taken by astronomers Petr Pravec at Ondřejov Observatory, Czech Republic, by Andreas Howell at Willowcroft Observatory, Florida, as well as by Brian Warner at his Palmer Divide Observatory, Colorado, and at the Center for Solar System Studies, California. The best-rated lightcurve gave a rotation period of 2.206 to 2.212 hours with a brightness variation between 0.08 and 0.12 magnitude (U=3/3/2+/3-).

=== Suspected moon ===
During the photometric observations in March 2012, Brian Warner found evidence of the existence of a minor-planet moon orbiting McAuliffe every 20.86 hours. However, it is only a "possible" synchronous binary system, as no mutual eclipsing/occultation events were observed. Follow-up observations in September and October 2016, did not confirm the binary nature of McAuliffe.

== Exploration ==
=== Deep Space 1 ===
McAuliffe, together with comet 76P/West–Kohoutek–Ikemura, were the original fly-by targets for the Deep Space 1 (DS1) mission. Launch was scheduled for 1 July 1998. A delay in the delivery of the spacecraft's power electronics system as well as insufficient time to test the flight software caused the launch to be postponed to 24 October 1998. Due to this delay, new targets had to be selected.

In July 1999, DS1 passed the alternative target 9969 Braille at a distance of 15 kilometers. In January 2001, comet 107P/Wilson–Harrington was encountered, and in September 2001, short-period comet 19P/Borrelly was passed at distance of only 2,200 kilometers.

== Naming ==
This minor planet was named in memory of Christa McAuliffe (1948–1986), teacher, civilian astronaut and one of the seven crew members who died in the Space Shuttle Challenger disaster on 28 January 1986. The minor planets 3350 Scobee, 3351 Smith, 3353 Jarvis, 3354 McNair, 3355 Onizuka, and 3356 Resnik were named for the other crew members of the ill-fated STS-51-L mission. The approved naming citation was published by the Minor Planet Center on 26 March 1986 (M.P.C. 10550).
