= Fran Bagenal =

Planetary scientist

Frances Bagenal
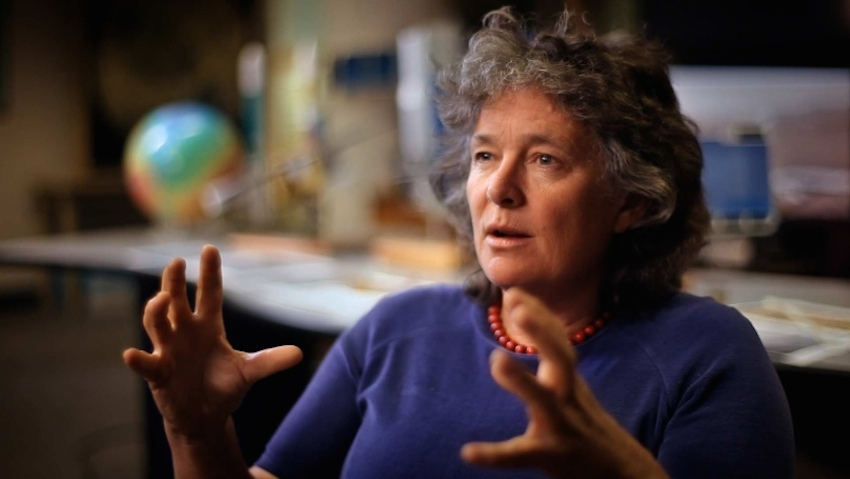
- Bagenal in 2019
- Born: 4 November 1954 (age 71); Dorchester, Dorset, England
- Education: Lancaster University; Massachusetts Institute of Technology
- Known for: Work on NASA planetary exploration missions as a plasma scientist
- Scientific career
- Fields: Planetary science
- Workplaces: NASA
- Thesis: The Inner Magnetosphere of Jupiter and the Io Plasma Torus (MIT, 1981)
- Doctoral advisor: John Belcher

Frances Bagenal (born 4 November 1954) is a Professor Emerita of Astrophysical and Planetary Sciences at the University of Colorado Boulder and a Senior Research Scientist at the Laboratory for Atmospheric and Space Physics in the fields of space plasmas and planetary magnetospheres. Born in Dorchester, Dorset, she grew up near Cambridge, England, studied at Lancaster University, and moved to the United States in 1976 to pursue graduate work at MIT, where she completed her PhD in 1981. She has been a plasma science team member on the Voyager, Galileo, Deep Space 1, Cassini, New Horizons, and Juno missions, and served as particles and plasma science team leader on New Horizons and Juno. In 2021 she was elected to the National Academy of Sciences, which recognised her as a leading expert on the properties of plasmas in the magnetospheres of the outer planets.

== Early life ==
Bagenal was born on 4 November 1954 in Dorchester, Dorset, England, and grew up near Cambridge. As a child she followed BBC science documentaries and the early years of the American space programme, later citing Carl Sagan as an early source of scientific inspiration.

She studied Physics and Geophysics at the University of Lancaster, graduating in 1976. Her undergraduate paper (supervised by John Hargreaves) on magnetic storms in the upper atmosphere provided the key to her next steps at graduate school.

In 1976, drawn by NASA's planetary missions, Bagenal applied to spend a year studying in the United States and secured a position at the Massachusetts Institute of Technology. She joined the Voyager Plasma Science team and decided to stay on for doctoral research. She was awarded her PhD in Earth and Planetary Sciences from MIT in 1981, with a thesis analyzing plasma data from the Voyager 1 encounter with Jupiter's magnetosphere. The thesis work included developing a detailed model of the structure and composition of the Io plasma torus – a ring of sulfur and oxygen ions shed by Jupiter's volcanic moon Io.

Following her doctorate, Bagenal spent five years (1982–1987) as a postdoctoral researcher in space physics at Imperial College London. The Voyager flybys of Uranus in 1986 and Neptune in 1989 drew her back to the United States, and she joined the faculty at the University of Colorado Boulder in 1989.

== Research ==
Bagenal's research addresses the magnetic fields of planets, the ionised gases held within those fields, and the way plasma interacts with the atmospheres and surfaces of moons, comets, and other bodies in the outer solar system. She combines spacecraft data analysis with theoretical modelling, and is particularly known for her work on Jupiter's magnetosphere and the Io plasma torus.

=== Voyager mission ===
Bagenal began her career as a member of the MIT Voyager Plasma Science (PLS) team. The Voyager 1 encounter with Jupiter in March 1979 provided the data for her doctoral thesis; she later recalled watching measurements of ionised sulphur and oxygen from Io's recently discovered volcanoes print out in real time as a defining moment in her early career. She went on to contribute plasma science analysis from Voyager encounters with Saturn, Uranus, and Neptune.

=== New Horizons mission to Pluto ===
Bagenal served as co-investigator and particles and plasma science team leader on NASA's New Horizons mission to Pluto. Her involvement in Pluto mission advocacy dates from 1989, when she first met principal investigator Alan Stern; it took roughly twelve years to win mission approval and a further nine years of flight before New Horizons reached the dwarf planet on 14 July 2015.

New Horizons carried two plasma instruments: the Solar Wind Around Pluto (SWAP) instrument, designed to measure the interaction between the solar wind and ions escaping from Pluto's atmosphere, and the Pluto Energetic Particle Spectrometer Science Investigation (PEPSSI). SWAP was designed at Southwest Research Institute, and listed Bagenal as a co-investigator.

Data from SWAP at the flyby showed that nitrogen in Pluto's atmosphere is ionised by ultraviolet sunlight, with the resulting ions picked up by the solar wind to form a comet-like tail extending downwind of the dwarf planet. Space.com quoted Bagenal as saying "This is just a first tantalizing look at Pluto's plasma environment."

EarthSky noted that Bagenal had been one of a small number of women on the original Voyager teams and that by the time of New Horizons the team included dozens of women scientists. Asked about the change, she said: "This isn't remarkable – it's just how it is."

=== Juno mission to Jupiter ===
Bagenal is co-investigator and co-chairs the magnetospheric working group (MWG) team leader on NASA's Juno mission to Jupiter. Juno entered a highly elliptical polar orbit around Jupiter on 4 July 2016. The MWG studies charged particles in Jupiter's magnetosphere to understand the planet's magnetic field, the dynamics of plasma flows, and the coupling between the magnetosphere and Jupiter's atmosphere.

The polar orbit gives the spacecraft close passes over Jupiter's auroral regions. Bagenal's team investigates how plasma from the Io plasma torus flows outward and drives auroral emissions through Alfvén wave propagation, work that connects directly to her decades-long study of the Io Jupiter system.

=== Galileo and other missions ===
Bagenal was a member of the science team on the Galileo mission to Jupiter, contributing to studies of the Io plasma torus and the inner magnetosphere. She also participated in the Cassini mission to Saturn as well as the Deep Space 1 mission to Comet Borrelly.

== Academic career ==
Bagenal joined the University of Colorado Boulder faculty in 1989 and was Professor of Astrophysical and Planetary Sciences until 2015, when she chose to step back from teaching to concentrate on the New Horizons and Juno missions. She holds the title of Professor Emerita and remains a Senior Research Scientist at LASP.

She edited the monograph Jupiter: The Planet, Satellites and Magnetosphere (Cambridge University Press, 2004), co-authored with Timothy E. Dowling and William B. McKinnon, which became a standard reference in the field.

She has cited UCLA planetary scientist Margy Kivelson as a key mentor from her graduate years onward. Reflecting on the duration of mission work, she has noted that she began advocating for a Pluto mission in 1989 – twenty-six years before New Horizons completed its flyby – as an example of the long timescales that define careers in outer solar system exploration.

Over more than two decades she has conducted research on the demographics of the space science workforce, including surveys of undergraduate physics education and studies of career pathways for women and scientists from under-represented groups.

== Honors ==
=== National Academy of Sciences ===
In 2021 Bagenal was elected to the National Academy of Sciences (NAS), widely regarded as the United States' most prestigious honorary scientific body. The academy cited her as "a leading expert on the properties of plasmas that pervade the magnetospheres of the outer planets". She was one of 120 scientists elected that year and one of 59 women — the largest number of women elected to the NAS in a single year up to that point.

On being elected, Bagenal described it as a great honor and said she hoped to use the membership to benefit the wider scientific community. She went on to co-chair a NAS committee on increasing diversity, equity, inclusion and accessibility in the leadership of competed space missions.

Bagenal has served on NAS committees for the Decadal Surveys in Planetary Science (2023) and in Heliophysics (2024).

=== Asteroid 10020 Bagenal ===
The outer main-belt asteroid 10020 Bagenal was discovered by astronomer Schelte J. Bus at Palomar Observatory on 26 August 1979 — the same year that Voyager 1 passed Jupiter and returned the data that would form the basis of Bagenal's doctoral thesis. Provisionally designated 1979 OQ5, it orbits the Sun in the outer main belt. The official naming citation was published on 13 April 2017 in Minor Planet Circulars 103974, roughly twenty months after the New Horizons Pluto flyby.

=== Other awards and fellowships ===
- Elected a Fellow of the American Geophysical Union in 2006.
- James Van Allen Lecture award of the American Geophysical Union in 2018
- Elected a Legacy Fellow of the American Astronomical Society in 2020
- Elected to the National Academy of Sciences in 2021

== Public engagement and media ==
Bagenal appeared as a contributor in The Farthest (2017), a PBS documentary directed by Emer Reynolds, which examined the scientific and cultural legacy of the Voyager programme. She spoke on screen about her work during the Voyager encounters with Jupiter, Saturn, Uranus and Neptune. The film was widely praised and received Emmy consideration.

She also featured in The Planets (2019), a five-part Nova miniseries broadcast on PBS and co-produced with the BBC, which traced the formation and history of the solar system's planets. Her contributions drew on her expertise in planetary magnetospheres and the outer solar system.

== Personal life ==
As a student, Bagenal was a keen member of the Lancaster University Speleological Society, which entered the caves of the Yorkshire Dales. She spent her summers exploring La Cueva del Agua near Tresviso in the Picos de Europa of northern Spain.

Upon moving to the US, Bagenal became a rock climber. Her spouse and climbing partner of over four decades is Stephen Bartlett, author of the book Desert Towers.

== Selected publications ==
- Bagenal, Fran; Dowling, Timothy E.; McKinnon, William B. (2004). Jupiter: the planet, Satellites and Magnetosphere. Cambridge University Press. ISBN 978-0-521-81808-7
- Bagenal, Fran et al. (2022). "Solar Wind Intersection with the Pluto System", in The Pluto System After New Horizons, University of Arizona Press Space Science Series.
- Bagenal, Fran (2024). "Magnetosphere of Jupiter", in Oxford Research Encyclopedia of Planetary Science.
