= 4435 Holt =

Asteroid

Discovery
- Discovered by: C. Shoemaker
- Discovery site: Palomar Obs.
- Discovery date: 13 January 1983

Designations
- Pronunciation: /ˈhoʊlt/
- Named after: Henry E. Holt (American astronomer)
- Alternative designations: 1983 AG_{2} · 1978 PZ_{2}
- Minor planet category: Mars-crosser

Orbital characteristics
- Epoch 4 September 2017 (JD 2458000.5)
- Uncertainty parameter 0
- Observation arc: 37.89 yr (13,840 days)
- Aphelion: 3.0939 AU
- Perihelion: 1.5405 AU
- Semi-major axis: 2.3172 AU
- Eccentricity: 0.3352
- Orbital period (sidereal): 3.53 yr (1,288 days)
- Mean anomaly: 319.21°
- Mean motion: 0° 16^{m} 45.84^{s} / day
- Inclination: 21.905°
- Longitude of ascending node: 330.93°
- Argument of perihelion: 110.08°
- Known satellites: 1

Physical characteristics
- Mean diameter: 5.03±1.17 km 6.44 km (derived)
- Synodic rotation period: 2.8670±0.0002 h
- Geometric albedo: 0.20 (assumed); 0.28±0.15 km
- Spectral type: SMASS = S
- Absolute magnitude (H): 13.1 · 13.32±0.11

4435 Holt, provisional designation 1983 AG_{2}, is a stony asteroid, sizable Mars-crosser and binary system from the inner regions of the asteroid belt, approximately 5 kilometers in diameter. It was discovered on 13 January 1983, by American astronomer Carolyn Shoemaker at the Palomar Observatory in California, United States. It was later named after American astronomer Henry E. Holt. The discovery of its companion was announced in January 2018.

== Orbit and classification ==
Holt orbits the Sun in the inner main-belt at a distance of 1.5–3.1 AU once every 3 years and 6 months (1,288 days). Its orbit has an eccentricity of 0.34 and an inclination of 22° with respect to the ecliptic. The first precovery was taken at Crimea-Nauchnij in 1978, extending the asteroid's observation arc by 5 years prior to its discovery.

== Naming ==
This minor planet was named for American planetary geologist and astronomer Henry E. Holt (born 1929), at NAU and USGS, who has explored the surface of the Moon, its geology and photometric properties during the Apollo and Surveyor programs.

After his retirement, Holt was a principal participant in the Palomar Asteroid and Comet Survey (PACS) from 1983 to 1993. Holt has discovered and co-discovered six comets and 683 minor planets between 1989 and 1993, including 4581 Asclepius, a potentially hazardous asteroid that has made the closest approach to Earth of all numbered asteroids. The official naming citation was published by the Minor Planet Center on 30 January 1991 (M.P.C. 17656).

== Physical characteristics ==
In the SMASS classification, Holt is a common S-type asteroid.

=== Diameter and albedo ===
According to the survey carried out by NASA's Wide-field Infrared Survey Explorer with its subsequent NEOWISE mission, Holt measures 5.03 kilometers in diameter and its surface has an albedo of 0.28, while the Collaborative Asteroid Lightcurve Linkassumes a standard albedo for stony asteroids of 0.20 and derives a diameter of 6.44 kilometer with an absolute magnitude of 13.32.

=== Satellite and rotation ===
In November 2017, a rotational lightcurve of Holt was obtained from photometric observation by Robert Stephens and collaborators. Lightcurve analysis gave a rotation period of 2.8670±0.0002 hours with a brightness variation of 0.15 magnitude. During the observations, the presence of an approximately 2-kilometer sized minor-planet moon was detected. The satellite orbits its primary every 42.6 hours (1.777 d).
