= 6726 Suthers =

Main-belt asteroid

Discovery
- Discovered by: H. E. Holt
- Discovery site: Palomar Obs.
- Discovery date: 5 August 1991

Designations
- Named after: Paul Sutherland (author and journalist)
- Alternative designations: 1991 PS · 1986 AG_{2}
- Minor planet category: main-belt · (inner) background

Orbital characteristics
- Epoch 4 September 2017 (JD 2458000.5)
- Uncertainty parameter 0
- Observation arc: 63.66 yr (23,250 days)
- Aphelion: 2.5004 AU
- Perihelion: 2.0740 AU
- Semi-major axis: 2.2872 AU
- Eccentricity: 0.0932
- Orbital period (sidereal): 3.46 yr (1,263 days)
- Mean anomaly: 96.351°
- Mean motion: 0° 17^{m} 5.64^{s} / day
- Inclination: 4.2993°
- Longitude of ascending node: 277.71°
- Argument of perihelion: 146.31°

Physical characteristics
- Dimensions: 3.455±0.404
- Geometric albedo: 0.207±0.050
- Absolute magnitude (H): 13.9

6726 Suthers, provisional designation 1991 PS, is a background asteroid from the inner regions of the asteroid belt, approximately 3.5 kilometers (2.2 miles) in diameter. It was discovered on 5 August 1991, by American astronomer Henry E. Holt at Palomar Observatory in San Diego County, California. The asteroid was named after author Paul Sutherland.

== Orbit and classification ==
Suthers is a non-family asteroid from the main belt's background population. It orbits the Sun in the inner main-belt at a distance of 2.1–2.5 AU once every 3 years and 6 months (1,263 days). Its orbit has an eccentricity of 0.09 and an inclination of 4° with respect to the ecliptic.

== Naming ==
In 2012, this minor planet was officially named after Paul Sutherland, author and journalist, who has actively supported the UK-based Society for Popular Astronomy for many years, and who is known as "Suthers" to friends and colleagues. He is author of Where Did Pluto Go? and responsible for bringing many astronomical stories to a wider public.

== Physical characteristics ==
According to the survey carried out by NASA's Wide-field Infrared Survey Explorer with its subsequent NEOWISE mission, Suthers measures 3.455 kilometers in diameter and its surface has an albedo of 0.207.
