= 4544 Xanthus =

Asteroid of the Apollo group

Xanthus
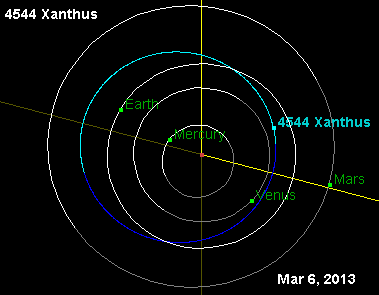
- Orbit diagram of Xanthus as of March 2013

Discovery
- Discovered by: Henry Holt and Norman G. Thomas
- Discovery site: Palomar Observatory
- Discovery date: 31 March 1989

Designations
- Pronunciation: /ˈzænθəs/
- Alternative designations: 1989 FB
- Minor planet category: Near-Earth object Apollo

Orbital characteristics
- Epoch 13 January 2016 (JD 2457400.5)
- Uncertainty parameter 0
- Observation arc: 7629 days (20.89 yr)
- Aphelion: 1.3023 AU (194.82 Gm)
- Perihelion: 0.78120 AU (116.866 Gm)
- Semi-major axis: 1.0418 AU (155.85 Gm)
- Eccentricity: 0.25012
- Orbital period (sidereal): 1.06 yr (388.38 d)
- Mean anomaly: 269.26925°
- Mean motion: 0° 55^{m} 36.923^{s} / day
- Inclination: 14.146°
- Longitude of ascending node: 24.00998°
- Argument of perihelion: 333.75°
- Earth MOID: 0.173705 AU (25.9859 Gm)

Physical characteristics
- Dimensions: 1.3 km
- Mean radius: 0.65 km
- Synodic rotation period: 37.65 h (1.569 d)
- Absolute magnitude (H): 17.1

4544 Xanthus /ˈzænθəs/, provisional designation 1989 FB, is an asteroid, classified as near-Earth object of the Apollo group, approximately 1.3 kilometers in diameter. It was discovered on 31 March 1989, by astronomers Henry Holt and Norman Thomas at the Palomar Observatory in California.
