= 2927 Alamosa =

Main-belt asteroid

Discovery
- Discovered by: N. G. Thomas
- Discovery site: Anderson Mesa Stn.
- Discovery date: 5 October 1981

Designations
- Named after: Alamosa, Colorado (discoverer's birthplace)
- Alternative designations: 1981 TM · 1936 OA; 1975 EN_{2}
- Minor planet category: main-belt · (middle) background

Orbital characteristics
- Epoch 27 April 2019 (JD 2458600.5)
- Uncertainty parameter 0
- Observation arc: 82.26 yr (30,044 d)
- Aphelion: 2.9605 AU
- Perihelion: 2.1020 AU
- Semi-major axis: 2.5312 AU
- Eccentricity: 0.1696
- Orbital period (sidereal): 4.03 yr (1,471 d)
- Mean anomaly: 162.56°
- Mean motion: 0° 14^{m} 40.92^{s} / day
- Inclination: 17.022°
- Longitude of ascending node: 150.47°
- Argument of perihelion: 189.56°

Physical characteristics
- Mean diameter: 11.83 km (calculated)
- Synodic rotation period: 4.3832 h
- Geometric albedo: 0.20 (assumed)
- Spectral type: S
- Absolute magnitude (H): 12.1

2927 Alamosa, provisional designation 1981 TM, is a stony background asteroid from the central region of the asteroid belt, approximately 12 kilometers (7.5 miles) in diameter. The asteroid was discovered on 5 October 1981, by American astronomer Norman Thomas at Lowell's Anderson Mesa Station in Flagstaff, Arizona. The S-type asteroid has a rotation period of 4.4 hours. It was named after the U.S. town of Alamosa in Colorado.

== Orbit and classification ==
Alamosa is a non-family asteroid from the main belt's background population. It orbits the Sun in the central asteroid belt at a distance of 2.1–3.0 AU once every 4.03 years (1,471 days; semi-major axis of 2.53 AU). Its orbit has an eccentricity of 0.17 and an inclination of 17° with respect to the ecliptic. It was first identified as 1936 OA at Heidelberg Observatory in 1936, extending the asteroid's observation arc by 45 years prior to its official discovery observation at Anderson Mesa.

== Naming ==
This minor planet was named after the U.S. town of Alamosa, Colorado, located in the San Luis Valley on the upper Rio Grande. The town is the birthplace of the discovering astronomer, Norman Thomas. The official naming citation was published by the Minor Planet Center on 20 December 1983 (M.P.C. 8405). Almosa is Spanish for cottonwood tree.

== Physical characteristics ==
Alamosa has been characterized as a common S-type asteroid by Pan-STARRS' survey, the Small Solar System Objects Spectroscopic Survey (S3OS2), as well as in the SDSS-based taxonomy. In the SMASS-like variant of the S3OS2 taxonomy, Alamosa is a K-type asteroid.

In April and May 2012, a rotational lightcurve was obtained from photometric observations made at the Phillips Academy Observatory (I12). Lightcurve analysis gave a well-defined rotation period of 4.3832±0.0002 hours with a brightness variation of 0.26 in magnitude (U=3). The Collaborative Asteroid Lightcurve Link assumes a standard albedo for stony asteroids of 0.20 and calculates a diameter of 11.8 kilometers with an absolute magnitude of 12.0.
