= 9175 Graun =

Asteroid

Discovery
- Discovered by: H. E. Holt
- Discovery site: Palomar Obs.
- Discovery date: 29 July 1990

Designations
- Named after: Ken Graun (American astronomy author)
- Alternative designations: 1990 OO_{2} · 1975 CL; 1980 BB_{1} · 1986 WS_{4} 1991 XL_{2}
- Minor planet category: main-belt Eunomia · Maria

Orbital characteristics
- Epoch 4 September 2017 (JD 2458000.5)
- Uncertainty parameter 0
- Observation arc: 42.11 yr (15,382 days)
- Aphelion: 2.9666 AU
- Perihelion: 2.2334 AU
- Semi-major axis: 2.6000 AU
- Eccentricity: 0.1410
- Orbital period (sidereal): 4.19 yr (1,531 days)
- Mean anomaly: 159.53°
- Mean motion: 0° 14^{m} 6.36^{s} / day
- Inclination: 15.069°
- Longitude of ascending node: 330.02°
- Argument of perihelion: 353.26°

Physical characteristics
- Dimensions: 7.929±0.142 km 10.23±2.25 km 10.35±0.71 km 10.53 km (calculated)
- Synodic rotation period: 20 h 25.8±0.5 h
- Geometric albedo: 0.183±0.027; 0.20±0.09; 0.21 (assumed); 0.308±0.042
- Spectral type: S
- Absolute magnitude (H): 12.2 · 12.25±0.38 · 12.4 · 12.66

9175 Graun, provisional designation 1990 OO_{2}, is a stony Eunomian asteroid from the central region of the asteroid belt, approximately 10 kilometers in diameter. It was discovered on 29 July 1990, by American astronomer Henry E. Holt at Palomar Observatory in California, United States. The asteroid was later named for American author and amateur astronomer Ken Graun.

== Orbit and classification ==
Graun is a member of the Eunomia family, a large group of S-type asteroids and the most prominent family in the intermediate main-belt. It orbits the Sun at a distance of 2.2–3.0 AU once every 4 years and 2 months (1,531 days). Its orbit has an eccentricity of 0.14 and an inclination of 15° with respect to the ecliptic. In February 1975, it was first identified as 1975 CL at the Karl Schwarzschild Observatory, extending the body's observation arc by 15 years prior to its official discovery observation at Palomar.

=== Alternative family ===
Based on its concurring orbital elements, Graun has also been group into the Maria family, which is named after its namesake, the asteroid 170 Maria. It is an old-type asteroid family, about (3±1)×10^{9} years old, located near the area of a 3:1 resonances with Jupiter that supplies near-Earth asteroids to the inner Solar System. It is estimated that every 100 million years, about 37 to 75 Maria asteroids larger than 1 kilometer become near-Earth objects.

== Physical characteristics ==
=== Lightcurves ===
In January 2013, a rotational lightcurve of Graun was obtained from photometric observations. Lightcurve analysis gave a rotation period of 25.8 hours with a brightness variation of 0.16 magnitude (U=2+). The measurement supersedes a shorter period of 20 hours with an amplitude of 0.2 magnitude (U=1).

=== Diameter and albedo ===
According to the surveys carried out by the NEOWISE mission of NASA's Wide-field Infrared Survey Explorer and the Japanese Akari satellite, Graun measures 10.23 and 10.35 kilometers in diameter, and its surface has an albedo of 0.20 and 0.183, respectively. Preliminary NEOWISE results gave a much higher albedo and consequently shorter diameter.

The Collaborative Asteroid Lightcurve Link assumes an albedo of 0.21 – derived from 15 Eunomia, the family's largest member and namesake – and calculates a diameter of 10.53 kilometers with an absolute magnitude of 12.2.

== Naming ==
This minor planet was named in honor of American amateur astronomer and publisher Ken Graun (born 1955), author of two books on astronomy, owner of "Ken Press" and the website What's Out tonight?, bringing astronomy to the broader public including children. The official naming citation was published by the Minor Planet Center on 9 March 2001 (M.P.C. 42358).
