= 3367 Alex =

Asteroid

Discovery
- Discovered by: N. G. Thomas
- Discovery site: Anderson Mesa Stn.
- Discovery date: 15 February 1983

Designations
- Named after: Alex R. Baltutis (discoverer's grandson)
- Alternative designations: 1983 CA_{3} · 1953 XM; 1971 SH_{2} · 1981 UQ_{9} 1981 UW_{15}
- Minor planet category: main-belt · (middle) background

Orbital characteristics
- Epoch 4 September 2017 (JD 2458000.5)
- Uncertainty parameter 0
- Observation arc: 63.42 yr (23,165 days)
- Aphelion: 2.9767 AU
- Perihelion: 2.5915 AU
- Semi-major axis: 2.7841 AU
- Eccentricity: 0.0692
- Orbital period (sidereal): 4.65 yr (1,697 days)
- Mean anomaly: 180.67°
- Mean motion: 0° 12^{m} 43.92^{s} / day
- Inclination: 5.3195°
- Longitude of ascending node: 258.18°
- Argument of perihelion: 237.17°

Physical characteristics
- Dimensions: 9.607±0.124 km 15.19±0.23 km 16.96±1.11 km 19.30 km (calculated)
- Synodic rotation period: 9.6 h 9.6±0.5 h
- Geometric albedo: 0.057 (assumed); 0.099±0.013; 0.101±0.014; 0.3033±0.0538
- Spectral type: SMASS = X E · X
- Absolute magnitude (H): 12.3 · 12.00 · 12.20 · 12.77±0.25

3367 Alex, provisional designation 1983 CA_{3}, is a background asteroid from the intermediate region of the asteroid belt, approximately 17 kilometers (11 miles) in diameter. It was discovered on 2 September 1993, by American astronomer Norman Thomas at Lowell's Anderson Mesa Station, near Flagstaff, Arizona, in the United States. The X-type asteroid has a rotation period of 9.6 hours. It was named after the grandson of the discoverer, Alex Baltutis.

== Orbit and classification ==
Alex is a non-family asteroid from the main belt's background population. It orbits the Sun in the central asteroid belt at a distance of 2.6–3.0 AU once every 4 years and 8 months (1,697 days). Its orbit has an eccentricity of 0.07 and an inclination of 5° with respect to the ecliptic. The asteroid was first identified as 1953 XM at Heidelberg Observatory in 1953, extending the body's observation arc by 30 years prior to its official discovery observation at Anderson Mesa.

== Naming ==
This minor planet was named by the discoverer after his grandson, Alex R. Baltutis. The official naming citation was published by the Minor Planet Center on 26 March 1986 (M.P.C. 10550).

== Physical characteristics ==
In the SMASS classification, Alex is an X-type asteroid, while NASA's Wide-field Infrared Survey Explorer characterizes it as a bright E-type asteroid. Due to its intermediate albedo, the body may be of metallic composition.

=== Rotation period ===
In February 2006 and April 2011, two rotational lightcurves of Alex were obtained from photometric observations made by French astronomers René Roy and Laurent Bernasconi, respectively. The fragmentary lightcurves gave an identical rotation period of 9.6 and 9.6±0.5 hours with a respective brightness variation of 0.01 and 0.05 in magnitude (U=1/1). Such a low amplitude typically indicates that the body has a nearly spheroidal shape.

=== Diameter and albedo ===
According to the space-based surveys carried out by the Japanese Akari satellite and by WISE with its subsequent NEOWISE mission, Alex has an albedo of 0.10, and measures 17.0 and 15.2 kilometers in diameter, respectively. The Collaborative Asteroid Lightcurve Link assumes a standard albedo for carbonaceous asteroids of 0.057 and calculates a diameter of 19.3 kilometers with an absolute magnitude of 12.3.
