= (5587) 1990 SB =

Near-Earth asteroid

Discovery
- Discovered by: H. E. Holt and J. A. Brown
- Discovery site: Palomar Observatory (675)
- Discovery date: 16 September 1990

Designations
- Alternative designations: 1990 UV_{12}
- Minor planet category: NEO · Amor

Orbital characteristics
- Epoch 21 November 2025 (JD 2461000.5)
- Uncertainty parameter 0
- Aphelion: 3.70727 AU
- Perihelion: 1.09391 AU
- Semi-major axis: 2.40059 AU
- Eccentricity: 0.544317
- Orbital period (sidereal): 3.71951 y (1358.55 d)
- Mean anomaly: 209.583°
- Mean motion: 0.264987° / d
- Inclination: 18.0410°
- Longitude of ascending node: 189.278°
- Argument of perihelion: 87.6129°
- Earth MOID: 0.31005 AU
- T_{Jupiter}: 3.251

Physical characteristics
- Mean diameter: 3.57 km
- Sidereal rotation period: 5.05219 h
- Pole ecliptic longitude: 253°
- Pole ecliptic latitude: –60°
- Geometric albedo: 0.32
- Spectral type: Sq-type; Color indices: B–V = 0.831±0.004; V–R = 0.471±0.002; V–I = 0.795±0.004; V–Z = 0.772±0.007
- Absolute magnitude (H): 13.89

(5587) 1990 SB is an unnamed near-Earth asteroid (NEA) orbiting in the inner Solar System. It was discovered on 16 September 1990 by astronomers Henry E. Holt and J. A. Brown. An Amor asteroid, it is 3.57 kilometres (2.22 mi) in size and has a highly elongated shape. It has a rotation period of 5.05 hours, spinning in a retrograde direction.

== History ==
1990 SB was discovered on 16 September 1990 by astronomers Henry E. Holt and J. A. Brown, who noted its fast motion at that time. It was observed using the 48-in Schmidt telescope at Palomar Observatory. It was given the provisional designation 1990 SB, and its discovery was announced in an International Astronomical Union Circular on 22 September. The asteroid was observed by the Crimean Astrophysical Observatory on 23 October, but it was reported as a new asteroid and given the provisional designation 1990 UV_{12}. The 23 October observation was later linked to 1990 SB by the Minor Planet Center on 4 June 1993, and the asteroid was assigned the minor planet number of 5587 that same day. As of 2025, it remains unnamed.

== Orbit ==
1990 SB is classified as a near-Earth object (NEO) of the Amor class. The Amor asteroids are a group of NEOs that have semi-major axes greater than one astronomical unit (AU) and do not cross Earth's orbit. 1990 SB has a semi-major axis of 2.40 AU, taking 3.72 years to complete one orbit around the Sun. Along its orbit, its distance from the Sun varies from 1.09 AU at perihelion to 3.71 AU at aphelion, due to its orbital eccentricity of 0.54. Its orbit is inclined by 18° with respect to the ecliptic plane.

== Physical characteristics ==
1990 SB is about 3.57 kilometres (2.22 mi) in size, based on thermal models using thermal-infrared observations from the Keck telescope. Photometric observations suggest that its shape is quite elongated, with axes ratios of a/b = 2.0 and b/c = 1.2. Its shape is also regular and symmetrical. Any concavities are not very deep; if it is a contact binary object, it is not very strongly bifurcated. The asteroid is classified as a stony Sq-type asteroid under the Bus classification scheme. It was previously suggested to be intermediate between the Q- and R-type asteroids after it was spectroscopically observed in 2001.

Observations of 1990 SB's lightcurve, or variations in its observed brightness, indicate that it has a rotation period of 5.05 hours. Its spin pole points toward the ecliptic south, meaning that the asteroid rotates in a retrograde direction.
