= (6491) 1991 OA =

Highly eccentric stony asteroid

Discovery
- Discovered by: H. E. Holt
- Discovery site: Palomar Obs.
- Discovery date: 16 July 1991

Designations
- Minor planet category: NEO · Amor · PHA

Orbital characteristics
- Epoch 4 September 2017 (JD 2458000.5)
- Uncertainty parameter 0
- Observation arc: 24.35 yr (8,895 days)
- Aphelion: 3.9772 AU
- Perihelion: 1.0227 AU
- Semi-major axis: 2.5000 AU
- Eccentricity: 0.5909
- Orbital period (sidereal): 3.95 yr (1,444 days)
- Mean anomaly: 215.03°
- Mean motion: 0° 14^{m} 57.48^{s} / day
- Inclination: 5.9464°
- Longitude of ascending node: 301.90°
- Argument of perihelion: 323.60°
- Earth MOID: 0.0420 AU · 16.4 LD

Physical characteristics
- Dimensions: 0.52 km (derived)
- Synodic rotation period: 2.69 h
- Geometric albedo: 0.20 (assumed)
- Spectral type: S
- Absolute magnitude (H): 18.77 · 18.9

(6491) 1991 OA is a highly eccentric, stony asteroid, classified as a near-Earth object and potentially hazardous asteroid, approximately half a kilometer in diameter. It was discovered on 16 July 1991, by American astronomer Henry E. Holt at the U.S. Palomar Observatory in California.

== Orbit and classification ==
The S-type body is an Amor asteroid – a subgroup of near-Earth asteroids that approach the orbit of Earth from beyond, but do not cross it. It orbits the Sun at a distance of 1.0–4.0 AU once every 3 years and 11 months (1,444 days). Its orbit has an eccentricity of 0.59 and an inclination of 6° with respect to the ecliptic. Its minimum orbit intersection distance (MOID) with Earth is 0.0420 AU, and on 1 August 2086, it will make a close approach and pass by Earth at a distance of 0.09 AU (13,000,000 km).

A first precovery was taken at the Australian Siding Spring Observatory in March 1991, extending the asteroid's observation arc by 4 months prior to its discovery.

== Physical characteristics ==
In 2000, a rotational lightcurve was published from photometric observations obtained by the Near-Earth Objects Follow-up Program during the early 1990s. The lightcurve rendered a rotation period of 2.69 hours with an brightness amplitude of 0.08 in magnitude (U=2). The Collaborative Asteroid Lightcurve Link (CALL) assumes an albedo of 0.20 and derives a diameter of 0.53 kilometers, based on an absolute magnitude of 18.77.

== Naming ==
As of 2017, 1991 OA remains unnamed.
