= Henry E. Holt =

American astronomer (1929–2019)

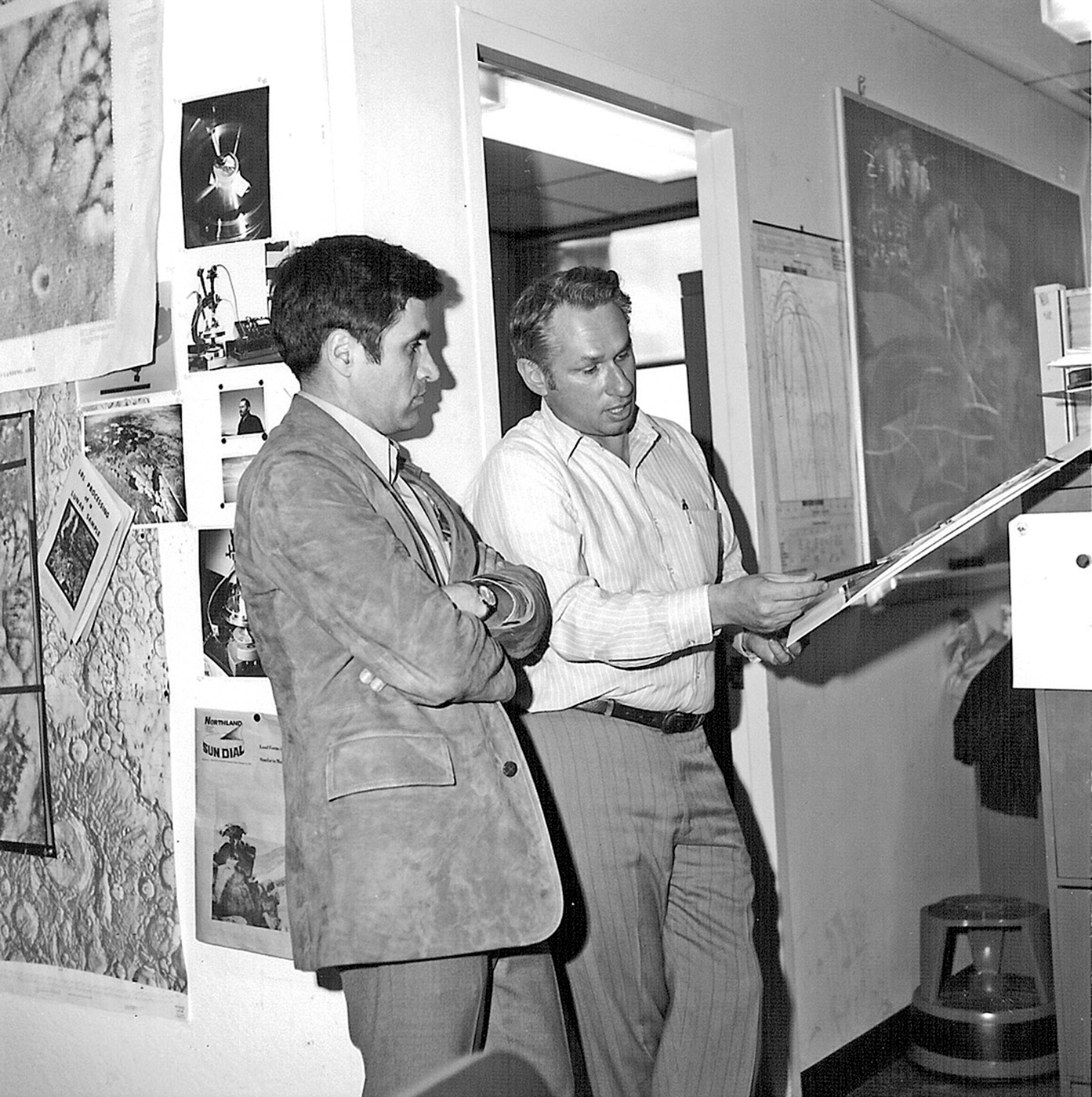
Henry Holt (right) with Jack Schmitt at the Arizona Bank Building

Minor planets discovered: 689
see § List of discovered minor planets

Henry E. Holt (September 27, 1929 – May 5, 2019) was an American astronomer and prolific discoverer of minor planets and comets, who has worked as a planetary geologist at the United States Geological Survey and Northern Arizona University.

== Career ==
In the 1960s he studied the photometric properties of the lunar surface as part of the Surveyor and Apollo programs.

Between 1989 and 1993, he has discovered nearly 700 minor planets, and ranks among the Top 30 discoverers in MPC's list. His discoveries including the potentially hazardous asteroid 4581 Asclepius, the numbered asteroid that has made the closest approach to Earth at the time, as well as the near-Earth asteroid 4544 Xanthus, and the main-belt asteroid 6312 Robheinlein, which he named after famous science fiction author, Robert Heinlein. He is also a co-discoverer of the three periodic comets 121P/Shoemaker-Holt, 127P/Holt–Olmstead (discovered with C. Michelle Olmstead), and 128P/Shoemaker-Holt.

== Awards and honors ==
The Mars-crossing asteroid 4435 Holt was named in his honor. The official naming citation was published by the Minor Planet Center on January 30, 1991 (M.P.C. 17656).

Minor planet 4582 Hank is named after his son, Henry Reid Holt.

== List of discovered minor planets ==
Henry Holt made some of his discoveries in collaboration with: ^{A} Norman G. Thomas, ^{B} David Levy, ^{C} Jeffery A. Brown, and ^{D} Carolyn Shoemaker

4502 Elizabethann	29 May 1989	list
4544 Xanthus	31 March 1989	list^{[A]}
4581 Asclepius	31 March 1989	list^{[A]}
4642 Murchie	23 August 1990	list
4643 Cisneros	23 August 1990	list
4711 Kathy	31 May 1989	list
4745 Nancymarie	9 July 1989	list
4955 Gold	17 September 1990	list
4958 Wellnitz	13 July 1991	list
5034 Joeharrington	7 August 1991	list
5132 Maynard	22 June 1990	list
5134 Ebilson	17 September 1990	list
5185 Alerossi	15 September 1990	list
5235 Jean-Loup	16 September 1990	list
5261 Eureka	20 June 1990	list^{[B]}
5290 Langevin	30 July 1990	list
5338 Michelblanc	13 September 1991	list
5406 Jonjoseph	9 August 1991	list
5439 Couturier	14 September 1990	list
5442 Drossart	12 July 1991	list
5443 Encrenaz	14 July 1991	list
5444 Gautier	5 August 1991	list
5445 Williwaw	7 August 1991	list
5446 Heyler	5 August 1991	list
5447 Lallement	6 August 1991	list

5485 Kaula	11 September 1991	list
5519 Lellouch	23 August 1990	list
5523 Luminet	5 August 1991	list
5524 Lecacheux	15 September 1991	list
5584 Izenberg	31 May 1989	list
(5587) 1990 SB	16 September 1990	list^{[C]}
5594 Jimmiller	12 July 1991	list
5595 Roth	5 August 1991	list
5596 Morbidelli	7 August 1991	list
5597 Warren	5 August 1991	list
5598 Carlmurray	8 August 1991	list
5642 Bobbywilliams	27 July 1990	list
5643 Roques	22 August 1990	list
5644 Maureenbell	22 August 1990	list
5833 Peterson	5 August 1991	list
5919 Patrickmartin	5 August 1991	list
5920 Davidbell	30 September 1992	list
(5963) 1990 QP_{2}	24 August 1990	list
(5964) 1990 QN_{4}	23 August 1990	list
(5965) 1990 SV_{15}	16 September 1990	list
5971 Tickell	12 July 1991	list
5972 Harryatkinson	5 August 1991	list
(5977) 1992 TH_{1}	1 October 1992	list
6011 Tozzi	29 August 1990	list
6013 Andanike	18 July 1991	list

6014 Chribrenmark	7 August 1991	list
6015 Paularego	7 August 1991	list
6016 Carnelli	7 August 1991	list
(6017) 1991 PY_{11}	7 August 1991	list
6018 Pierssac	7 August 1991	list
(6045) 1991 RG_{9}	11 September 1991	list
(6046) 1991 RF_{14}	13 September 1991	list
6069 Cevolani	8 August 1991	list
6131 Towen	27 July 1990	list
6132 Danielson	22 August 1990	list
6133 Royaldutchastro	14 September 1990	list
6134 Kamagari	15 September 1990	list
6135 Billowen	14 September 1990	list
6154 Stevesynnott	22 August 1990	list
(6242) 1990 OJ_{2}	29 July 1990	list
6243 Yoder	27 July 1990	list
6311 Porubčan	15 September 1990	list
6312 Robheinlein	14 September 1990	list
6314 Reigber	17 September 1990	list
(6328) 1991 NL_{1}	12 July 1991	list
6386 Keithnoll	10 July 1989	list
(6394) 1990 QM_{2}	22 August 1990	list
6406 Mikejura	28 June 1992	list
(6407) 1992 PF_{2}	2 August 1992	list
(6453) 1991 NY	13 July 1991	list

(6490) 1991 NR_{2}	12 July 1991	list
(6491) 1991 OA	16 July 1991	list
6641 Bobross	29 July 1990	list
(6648) 1991 PM_{11}	9 August 1991	list
6651 Rogervenable	10 September 1991	list
(6652) 1991 SJ_{1}	16 September 1991	list
6714 Montréal	29 July 1990	list
6715 Sheldonmarks	22 August 1990	list^{[B]}
(6716) 1990 RO_{1}	14 September 1990	list
6726 Suthers	5 August 1991	list
(6782) 1990 SU_{10}	16 September 1990	list
(6787) 1991 PF_{15}	7 August 1991	list
(6788) 1991 PH_{15}	7 August 1991	list
(6858) 1990 ST_{10}	16 September 1990	list
(6863) 1991 PX_{8}	5 August 1991	list
6904 McGill	22 August 1990	list
6914 Becquerel	3 April 1992	list^{[D]}^{[B]}
(6963) 1990 OQ_{3}	27 July 1990	list
6974 Solti	27 June 1992	list
(7024) 1992 PA_{4}	2 August 1992	list
7055 Fabiopagan	31 May 1989	list
7057 Al-Fārābī	22 August 1990	list
7058 Al-Ṭūsī	16 September 1990	list
7059 Van Dokkum	18 September 1990	list
7060 Al-'Ijliya	16 September 1990	list

7065 Fredschaaf	2 August 1992	list
(7085) 1991 PE	5 August 1991	list
7124 Glinos	24 July 1990	list
(7180) 1991 NG_{1}	12 July 1991	list
(7181) 1991 PH_{12}	7 August 1991	list
(7183) 1991 RE_{16}	15 September 1991	list
(7184) 1991 RB_{25}	11 September 1991	list
(7190) 1993 GB_{1}	15 April 1993	list
(7191) 1993 MA_{1}	18 June 1993	list
7194 Susanrose	18 September 1993	list
(7245) 1991 RN_{10}	10 September 1991	list
(7246) 1991 RP_{25}	12 September 1991	list
(7286) 1990 QZ_{4}	24 August 1990	list
(7337) 1990 QH_{1}	22 August 1990	list
(7339) 1991 RA_{16}	15 September 1991	list
(7411) 1990 QQ_{1}	22 August 1990	list
(7419) 1991 PN_{13}	5 August 1991	list
(7423) 1992 PT_{2}	2 August 1992	list
(7424) 1992 PS_{6}	6 August 1992	list
(7477) 1993 LC	13 June 1993	list
(7521) 1990 QS_{2}	24 August 1990	list
(7523) 1991 PF_{18}	8 August 1991	list
(7524) 1991 RW_{19}	14 September 1991	list
(7577) 1990 QV_{4}	24 August 1990	list
(7585) 1991 PK_{8}	5 August 1991	list

(7646) 1989 KE	29 May 1989	list
(7652) 1991 RL_{5}	13 September 1991	list
(7702) 1991 PO_{13}	5 August 1991	list
(7759) 1990 QD_{2}	22 August 1990	list
(7760) 1990 RW_{3}	14 September 1990	list
(7762) 1990 SY_{2}	18 September 1990	list
(7768) 1991 SX_{1}	16 September 1991	list
(7819) 1990 RR_{3}	14 September 1990	list
(7823) 1991 PF_{10}	7 August 1991	list
(7827) 1992 QE_{2}	22 August 1992	list
(7883) 1993 GD_{1}	15 April 1993	list
7936 Mikemagee	30 July 1990	list
(7937) 1990 QA_{2}	22 August 1990	list
(7938) 1990 SL_{2}	17 September 1990	list
(7941) 1991 NE_{1}	12 July 1991	list
(7943) 1991 PQ_{12}	5 August 1991	list
(7944) 1991 PR_{12}	5 August 1991	list
(7946) 1991 RV_{13}	13 September 1991	list
(8015) 1990 QT_{2}	24 August 1990	list
(8016) 1990 QW_{10}	27 August 1990	list
(8017) 1990 RM_{5}	15 September 1990	list
(8018) 1990 SW	16 September 1990	list
8027 Robertrushworth	7 August 1991	list
8029 Miltthompson	15 September 1991	list
(8090) 1991 RO_{23}	15 September 1991	list

8160 Petererwin	21 June 1990	list
(8162) 1990 SK_{11}	16 September 1990	list
(8170) 1991 PZ_{11}	7 August 1991	list
(8172) 1991 RP_{15}	15 September 1991	list
(8173) 1991 RX_{23}	11 September 1991	list
(8174) 1991 SL_{2}	17 September 1991	list
(8180) 1992 PY_{2}	6 August 1992	list
8280 Petergruber	7 August 1991	list
(8281) 1991 PC_{18}	8 August 1991	list
(8292) 1992 SU_{14}	30 September 1992	list
(8362) 1990 QM_{1}	22 August 1990	list
(8364) 1990 RE_{5}	15 September 1990	list
(8365) 1990 RR_{5}	15 September 1990	list
8380 Tooting	29 September 1992	list
(8394) 1993 TM_{12}	13 October 1993	list
8494 Edpatvega	25 July 1990	list
(8495) 1990 QV_{1}	22 August 1990	list
(8510) 1991 PT_{8}	5 August 1991	list
(8511) 1991 PY_{10}	7 August 1991	list
(8512) 1991 PC_{11}	7 August 1991	list
(8513) 1991 PK_{11}	9 August 1991	list
(8514) 1991 PK_{15}	7 August 1991	list
(8528) 1992 SC_{24}	29 September 1992	list
(8655) 1990 QJ_{1}	22 August 1990	list
(8658) 1990 RG_{3}	14 September 1990	list

(8659) 1990 SE_{11}	17 September 1990	list
(8669) 1991 NS_{1}	13 July 1991	list
(8671) 1991 PW	5 August 1991	list
(8673) 1991 RN_{5}	13 September 1991	list
(8689) 1992 PU_{3}	5 August 1992	list
(8701) 1993 LG_{2}	15 June 1993	list
(8844) 1990 QR_{2}	24 August 1990	list
(8845) 1990 RD	14 September 1990	list
(8859) 1991 PQ_{11}	9 August 1991	list
(9035) 1990 SH_{1}	16 September 1990	list
(9036) 1990 SJ_{16}	17 September 1990	list
(9045) 1991 PG_{15}	7 August 1991	list
(9046) 1991 PG_{17}	9 August 1991	list
(9048) 1991 RD_{24}	12 September 1991	list
(9049) 1991 RQ_{27}	12 September 1991	list
(9050) 1991 RF_{29}	13 September 1991	list
9175 Graun	29 July 1990	list
(9181) 1991 NP_{2}	14 July 1991	list
(9183) 1991 OW	18 July 1991	list
(9185) 1991 PX_{17}	7 August 1991	list
(9188) 1991 RM_{15}	15 September 1991	list
(9332) 1990 SB_{1}	16 September 1990	list
(9343) 1991 PO_{11}	9 August 1991	list
(9345) 1991 RA_{10}	12 September 1991	list
(9347) 1991 RY_{21}	15 September 1991	list

(9348) 1991 RH_{25}	11 September 1991	list
9584 Louchheim	25 July 1990	list
(9585) 1990 QY_{2}	28 August 1990	list
(9586) 1990 SG_{11}	16 September 1990	list
(9593) 1991 PZ_{17}	7 August 1991	list
(9595) 1991 RE_{11}	13 September 1991	list
(9596) 1991 RC_{22}	15 September 1991	list
(9608) 1992 PD_{2}	2 August 1992	list
(9627) 1993 LU_{1}	15 June 1993	list
(9752) 1990 QZ_{1}	22 August 1990	list
(9753) 1990 QL_{3}	28 August 1990	list
(9754) 1990 QJ_{4}	23 August 1990	list
(9755) 1990 RR_{2}	15 September 1990	list
(9760) 1991 PJ_{13}	5 August 1991	list
(9763) 1991 RU_{17}	13 September 1991	list
(9846) 1990 OS_{1}	29 July 1990	list
(9847) 1990 QJ_{5}	25 August 1990	list
(9849) 1990 RF_{2}	14 September 1990	list
(9862) 1991 RA_{6}	13 September 1991	list
(9864) 1991 RT_{17}	13 September 1991	list
(9877) 1993 ST_{3}	18 September 1993	list
(9946) 1990 ON_{2}	29 July 1990	list
(9948) 1990 QB2	22 August 1990	list
(9955) 1991 PU_{11}	7 August 1991	list
10081 Dantaylor	29 July 1990	list

10082 Bronson	29 July 1990	list
10083 Gordonanderson	22 August 1990	list
10084 Rossparker	25 August 1990	list
10085 Jekennedy	25 August 1990	list
10086 McCurdy	16 September 1990	list
10087 Dechesne	18 September 1990	list
10096 Colleenohare	13 September 1991	list
10097 Humbroncos	15 September 1991	list
(10112) 1992 OP_{1}	31 July 1992	list
(10113) 1992 PX_{2}	6 August 1992	list
(10133) 1993 GC_{1}	15 April 1993	list
(10135) 1993 LZ_{1}	13 June 1993	list
(10307) 1990 QX_{1}	22 August 1990	list
(10308) 1990 QC_{3}	28 August 1990	list
(10309) 1990 QC_{6}	23 August 1990	list
(10312) 1990 QT_{9}	23 August 1990	list
(10314) 1990 RF	14 September 1990	list
(10317) 1990 SA_{15}	17 September 1990	list
(10336) 1991 PJ_{12}	7 August 1991	list
(10338) 1991 RB_{11}	10 September 1991	list
(10339) 1991 RK_{17}	11 September 1991	list
(10341) 1991 SC_{2}	16 September 1991	list
(10357) 1993 SL_{3}	19 September 1993	list
(10359) 1993 TU_{36}	13 October 1993	list
(10518) 1990 MC	18 June 1990	list

(10519) 1990 RO_{2}	15 September 1990	list
(10520) 1990 RS_{2}	15 September 1990	list
(10522) 1990 SN_{3}	18 September 1990	list
(10532) 1991 NA_{2}	14 July 1991	list
(10533) 1991 PT_{12}	5 August 1991	list
(10534) 1991 PV_{16}	7 August 1991	list
(10536) 1991 RZ_{8}	11 September 1991	list
(10537) 1991 RY_{16}	15 September 1991	list
(10548) 1992 PJ_{2}	2 August 1992	list
(10754) 1990 QV_{5}	29 August 1990	list
(10756) 1990 SJ_{2}	17 September 1990	list
(10757) 1990 SF_{3}	18 September 1990	list
(10759) 1990 SX_{16}	17 September 1990	list
(10783) 1991 RB_{9}	11 September 1991	list
(10826) 1993 SK_{16}	19 September 1993	list
(11046) 1990 OE_{4}	30 July 1990	list
(11047) 1990 QL_{1}	22 August 1990	list
(11048) 1990 QZ_{5}	29 August 1990	list
(11049) 1990 RK_{2}	14 September 1990	list
(11058) 1991 PN_{10}	7 August 1991	list
(11060) 1991 RA_{13}	10 September 1991	list
(11065) 1991 XE_{2}	1 December 1991	list
(11285) 1990 QU_{3}	22 August 1990	list
(11287) 1990 SX	16 September 1990	list
(11291) 1991 RZ_{10}	10 September 1991	list

(11310) 1993 SB_{15}	19 September 1993	list
(11525) 1991 RE_{25}	11 September 1991	list
(11539) 1992 PQ_{2}	2 August 1992	list
(11540) 1992 PV_{3}	5 August 1992	list
(11570) 1993 LE	14 June 1993	list
(11879) 1990 QR_{1}	22 August 1990	list
(11880) 1990 QQ_{4}	24 August 1990	list
(11882) 1990 RA_{3}	14 September 1990	list
(11883) 1990 RD_{5}	15 September 1990	list
(11901) 1991 PV_{11}	7 August 1991	list
(11902) 1991 PZ_{12}	5 August 1991	list
(12268) 1990 OY_{1}	29 July 1990	list
(12271) 1990 RC_{2}	14 September 1990	list
(12293) 1991 NV_{1}	13 July 1991	list
(12296) 1991 PL_{13}	5 August 1991	list
(12297) 1991 PT_{14}	6 August 1991	list
(12299) 1991 PV_{17}	7 August 1991	list
(12300) 1991 RX_{10}	10 September 1991	list
(12302) 1991 RV_{17}	13 September 1991	list
(12303) 1991 RB_{24}	11 September 1991	list
12321 Zurakowski	4 August 1992	list
(12723) 1991 PD_{10}	7 August 1991	list
(12724) 1991 PZ_{14}	6 August 1991	list
(12725) 1991 PP_{16}	7 August 1991	list
(12726) 1991 PQ_{16}	7 August 1991	list

(12730) 1991 RU_{8}	11 September 1991	list
(12731) 1991 RW_{12}	10 September 1991	list
(12743) 1992 PL_{2}	2 August 1992	list
(12754) 1993 LF_{2}	15 June 1993	list
(13040) 1990 OB_{4}	29 July 1990	list
(13041) 1990 OS_{4}	25 July 1990	list
(13043) 1990 QT_{4}	24 August 1990	list
(13047) 1990 RJ_{5}	15 September 1990	list
(13050) 1990 SY	16 September 1990	list
(13054) 1990 ST_{15}	16 September 1990	list
(13065) 1991 PG_{11}	9 August 1991	list
(13066) 1991 PM_{13}	5 August 1991	list
(13067) 1991 PA_{15}	6 August 1991	list
(13071) 1991 RT_{5}	13 September 1991	list
(13072) 1991 RS_{8}	11 September 1991	list
(13073) 1991 RE_{15}	15 September 1991	list
(13074) 1991 RK_{15}	15 September 1991	list
(13089) 1992 PH_{2}	2 August 1992	list
(13090) 1992 PV_{2}	6 August 1992	list
(13091) 1992 PT_{3}	5 August 1992	list
13514 Mikerudenko	18 June 1990	list
(13515) 1990 SG_{12}	19 September 1990	list
(13524) 1991 OO	18 July 1991	list
(13527) 1991 PJ_{15}	7 August 1991	list
(13528) 1991 PM_{16}	7 August 1991	list

(13532) 1991 RY_{8}	11 September 1991	list
(13535) 1991 RS_{13}	13 September 1991	list
(13536) 1991 RA_{15}	15 September 1991	list
(13578) 1993 MK	17 June 1993	list
(13944) 1990 OX_{1}	29 July 1990	list
(13945) 1990 OH_{2}	29 July 1990	list
(13946) 1990 OK_{3}	27 July 1990	list
(13947) 1990 QB_{5}	24 August 1990	list
(13948) 1990 QB_{6}	24 August 1990	list
(13949) 1990 RN_{3}	14 September 1990	list
(13950) 1990 RP_{9}	14 September 1990	list
(13961) 1991 PV	5 August 1991	list
(13965) 1991 PL_{8}	5 August 1991	list
(13966) 1991 PR_{16}	7 August 1991	list
(13969) 1991 RK_{26}	11 September 1991	list
(13970) 1991 RH_{27}	13 September 1991	list
(14002) 1993 LW_{1}	15 June 1993	list
(14009) 1993 TQ_{36}	13 October 1993	list
(14383) 1990 OY_{3}	27 July 1990	list
(14384) 1990 OH_{4}	24 July 1990	list
(14385) 1990 QG_{1}	22 August 1990	list
(14386) 1990 QN_{2}	22 August 1990	list
(14387) 1990 QE_{5}	25 August 1990	list
(14388) 1990 QO_{5}	29 August 1990	list
(14389) 1990 QR_{5}	26 August 1990	list

(14390) 1990 QP_{10}	26 August 1990	list
(14391) 1990 RE_{2}	14 September 1990	list
(14394) 1990 SP_{15}	18 September 1990	list
(14405) 1991 PE_{8}	5 August 1991	list
(14406) 1991 PP_{8}	5 August 1991	list
(14407) 1991 PQ_{8}	5 August 1991	list
(14408) 1991 PC_{16}	6 August 1991	list
(14414) 1991 RF_{6}	13 September 1991	list
(14417) 1991 RN_{13}	13 September 1991	list
(14418) 1991 RU_{16}	15 September 1991	list
(14419) 1991 RK_{23}	15 September 1991	list
(14422) 1991 SK_{2}	16 September 1991	list
(14423) 1991 SM_{2}	16 September 1991	list
(14442) 1992 SR_{25}	30 September 1992	list
(14452) 1992 WB_{9}	25 November 1992	list
(14864) 1990 QK_{4}	23 August 1990	list
(14866) 1990 RF_{1}	14 September 1990	list
(14867) 1990 RW_{4}	15 September 1990	list
(14881) 1991 PK	5 August 1991	list
(14882) 1991 PP_{11}	9 August 1991	list
(14883) 1991 PT_{11}	7 August 1991	list
(14884) 1991 PH_{16}	7 August 1991	list
(14886) 1991 RL_{9}	11 September 1991	list
(14887) 1991 RQ_{14}	15 September 1991	list
(15253) 1990 QA_{4}	23 August 1990	list

(15254) 1990 QM_{4}	23 August 1990	list
(15256) 1990 RD_{1}	14 September 1990	list
(15280) 1991 PW_{11}	7 August 1991	list
(15281) 1991 PT_{16}	7 August 1991	list
(15283) 1991 RB_{8}	12 September 1991	list
(15284) 1991 RZ_{16}	15 September 1991	list
(15285) 1991 RW_{18}	14 September 1991	list
(15286) 1991 RJ_{22}	15 September 1991	list
(15287) 1991 RX_{25}	12 September 1991	list
(15288) 1991 RN_{27}	11 September 1991	list
(15302) 1992 TJ_{1}	2 October 1992	list
(15333) 1993 TS_{36}	13 October 1993	list
(15722) 1990 QV_{2}	24 August 1990	list
(15744) 1991 PU	5 August 1991	list
(15746) 1991 PN_{8}	5 August 1991	list
(15747) 1991 RW_{23}	11 September 1991	list
(15748) 1991 RG_{25}	11 September 1991	list
(15777) 1993 LF	14 June 1993	list
(16470) 1990 OM_{2}	29 July 1990	list
(16471) 1990 OR_{3}	27 July 1990	list
(16472) 1990 OE_{5}	27 July 1990	list
(16473) 1990 QF_{2}	22 August 1990	list
(16474) 1990 QG_{3}	28 August 1990	list
(16475) 1990 QS_{4}	24 August 1990	list
(16476) 1990 QU_{4}	24 August 1990	list

(16477) 1990 QH_{5}	25 August 1990	list
(16485) 1990 RG_{2}	14 September 1990	list
(16486) 1990 RM_{3}	14 September 1990	list
(16488) 1990 RX_{8}	13 September 1990	list
(16490) 1990 ST_{2}	18 September 1990	list
(16491) 1990 SA_{3}	18 September 1990	list
(16500) 1990 SX_{10}	16 September 1990	list
(16537) 1991 PF_{11}	8 August 1991	list
(16538) 1991 PO_{12}	5 August 1991	list
(16539) 1991 PY_{12}	5 August 1991	list
(16540) 1991 PO_{16}	7 August 1991	list
(16541) 1991 PW_{18}	8 August 1991	list
(16546) 1991 RP_{5}	13 September 1991	list
(16548) 1991 RR_{9}	10 September 1991	list
(16549) 1991 RE_{10}	12 September 1991	list
(16550) 1991 RB_{13}	10 September 1991	list
(16551) 1991 RT_{14}	15 September 1991	list
(16585) 1992 QR	23 August 1992	list
(16591) 1992 SY_{17}	30 September 1992	list
(16592) 1992 TM_{1}	3 October 1992	list
(16595) 1992 UU_{6}	20 October 1992	list
(16622) 1993 GG_{1}	15 April 1993	list
(16629) 1993 LK_{1}	15 June 1993	list
(16651) 1993 TS_{11}	13 October 1993	list
(16652) 1993 TT_{12}	13 October 1993	list

(17430) 1989 KF	31 May 1989	list
(17449) 1990 OD_{5}	27 July 1990	list
(17450) 1990 QO_{4}	23 August 1990	list
(17453) 1990 RQ_{9}	14 September 1990	list
(17457) 1990 SC_{11}	16 September 1990	list
(17480) 1991 PE_{10}	7 August 1991	list
(17481) 1991 PE_{11}	7 August 1991	list
(17482) 1991 PY_{14}	6 August 1991	list
(17549) 1993 TW_{12}	13 October 1993	list
18349 Dafydd	25 July 1990	list
(18350) 1990 QJ_{2}	22 August 1990	list
(18351) 1990 QN_{5}	29 August 1990	list
(18354) 1990 RK_{5}	15 September 1990	list
(18355) 1990 RN_{9}	14 September 1990	list
(18356) 1990 SF_{1}	16 September 1990	list
(18357) 1990 SR_{2}	18 September 1990	list
(18358) 1990 SB_{11}	16 September 1990	list
(18370) 1991 NS_{2}	12 July 1991	list
(18371) 1991 PH_{10}	7 August 1991	list
(18372) 1991 RF_{16}	15 September 1991	list
(18373) 1991 RQ_{16}	15 September 1991	list
(18374) 1991 RA_{18}	13 September 1991	list
(18375) 1991 RC_{27}	13 September 1991	list
(18392) 1992 PT_{4}	2 August 1992	list
(18397) 1992 SF_{14}	28 September 1992	list

(19152) 1990 OB_{5}	27 July 1990	list
(19153) 1990 QB_{3}	28 August 1990	list
(19154) 1990 QX_{4}	24 August 1990	list
(19177) 1991 PJ_{11}	9 August 1991	list
(19179) 1991 RK_{8}	12 September 1991	list
(19180) 1991 RK_{16}	15 September 1991	list
(19206) 1992 PH_{4}	2 August 1992	list
(19207) 1992 QS_{1}	24 August 1992	list
(19987) 1990 QJ_{3}	28 August 1990	list
(19988) 1990 QW_{3}	22 August 1990	list
(20009) 1991 OY	18 July 1991	list
(20011) 1991 PD_{13}	5 August 1991	list
(20013) 1991 RT_{26}	11 September 1991	list
20014 Annalisa	13 September 1991	list
(20034) 1992 PK_{2}	2 August 1992	list
(21041) 1990 QO_{1}	22 August 1990	list
(21043) 1990 RT_{2}	15 September 1990	list
(21044) 1990 SE_{1}	16 September 1990	list
(21045) 1990 SQ_{1}	18 September 1990	list
(21046) 1990 SH_{3}	18 September 1990	list
(21049) 1990 SU_{16}	17 September 1990	list
(21072) 1991 PU_{8}	5 August 1991	list
(21077) 1991 RG_{14}	13 September 1991	list
(21078) 1991 RR_{16}	15 September 1991	list
(21079) 1991 RR_{17}	11 September 1991	list

(21080) 1991 RD_{18}	13 September 1991	list
(21081) 1991 RC_{19}	14 September 1991	list
(21106) 1992 PO_{2}	2 August 1992	list
(21107) 1992 PZ_{4}	4 August 1992	list
(21152) 1993 MB_{1}	17 June 1993	list
(22302) 1990 OG_{4}	24 July 1990	list
(22303) 1990 QE_{4}	23 August 1990	list
(22304) 1990 RU_{9}	14 September 1990	list
(22305) 1990 SD_{2}	17 September 1990	list
(22320) 1991 PH_{18}	8 August 1991	list
(22323) 1991 RC_{6}	13 September 1991	list
(22324) 1991 RQ_{9}	10 September 1991	list
(22325) 1991 RE_{19}	14 September 1991	list
(23484) 1991 NC_{1}	12 July 1991	list
(23488) 1991 PF_{12}	7 August 1991	list
(23489) 1991 PU_{16}	7 August 1991	list
(23491) 1991 RX_{17}	13 September 1991	list
(23492) 1991 RA_{20}	14 September 1991	list
(23494) 1991 SE_{2}	16 September 1991	list
(23510) 1992 PA_{2}	4 August 1992	list
(23511) 1992 PB_{2}	4 August 1992	list
(23512) 1992 PC_{3}	6 August 1992	list
(23513) 1992 PZ_{3}	2 August 1992	list
(24690) 1990 QX_{5}	29 August 1990	list
(24691) 1990 RH_{3}	14 September 1990	list

(24694) 1990 SZ_{2}	18 September 1990	list
(24702) 1991 OR	18 July 1991	list
(24710) 1991 PX_{14}	6 August 1991	list
(24714) 1991 RT_{9}	10 September 1991	list
(24715) 1991 RZ_{15}	15 September 1991	list
(24716) 1991 RB_{19}	14 September 1991	list
(24720) 1991 SV_{1}	16 September 1991	list
(24784) 1993 TV_{12}	13 October 1993	list
(26100) 1990 QL_{5}	29 August 1990	list
(26103) 1990 SC_{3}	18 September 1990	list
(26111) 1991 OV	18 July 1991	list
(26112) 1991 PG_{18}	8 August 1991	list
(26113) 1991 PL_{18}	8 August 1991	list
(26115) 1991 RG_{17}	15 September 1991	list
(26116) 1991 RW_{17}	13 September 1991	list
(26117) 1991 RX_{21}	11 September 1991	list
(26124) 1992 PG_{2}	2 August 1992	list
(26831) 1990 OC_{5}	27 July 1990	list
(26833) 1990 RE	14 September 1990	list
(26834) 1990 RM_{9}	14 September 1990	list
(26838) 1991 RC_{9}	11 September 1991	list
(26839) 1991 RC_{10}	12 September 1991	list
(26853) 1992 UQ_{2}	20 October 1992	list
(27722) 1990 OB_{2}	29 July 1990	list
(27725) 1990 QF_{4}	23 August 1990	list

(27726) 1990 QM_{5}	29 August 1990	list
(27730) 1990 QU_{9}	26 August 1990	list
(27731) 1990 RK_{3}	14 September 1990	list
(27754) 1991 PP_{9}	5 August 1991	list
(27755) 1991 PD_{11}	7 August 1991	list
(27756) 1991 PS_{14}	6 August 1991	list
(27757) 1991 PO_{18}	7 August 1991	list
(27759) 1991 RE_{6}	13 September 1991	list
(27761) 1991 RL_{13}	13 September 1991	list
(27762) 1991 RD_{16}	15 September 1991	list
(27763) 1991 RN_{22}	15 September 1991	list
(29170) 1990 OA_{3}	27 July 1990	list
(29171) 1990 QK_{3}	28 August 1990	list
(29172) 1990 QL_{4}	23 August 1990	list
(29173) 1990 QW_{4}	24 August 1990	list
(29178) 1990 RW_{8}	13 September 1990	list
(29206) 1991 PX_{10}	7 August 1991	list
(29209) 1991 RV_{7}	12 September 1991	list
(29211) 1991 RY_{15}	15 September 1991	list
(29303) 1993 TO_{36}	11 October 1993	list
(30811) 1990 OD_{2}	29 July 1990	list
(30812) 1990 OZ_{4}	25 July 1990	list
(30815) 1990 QH_{2}	22 August 1990	list
(30816) 1990 QA_{6}	29 August 1990	list
(30818) 1990 RH_{2}	14 September 1990	list

(30820) 1990 RU_{2}	15 September 1990	list
(30823) 1990 SY_{15}	16 September 1990	list
(30846) 1991 PJ_{17}	9 August 1991	list
(30848) 1991 RZ_{19}	14 September 1991	list
(30849) 1991 RE_{20}	14 September 1991	list
(30880) 1992 PC_{2}	2 August 1992	list
(30884) 1992 SL_{23}	30 September 1992	list
(30915) 1993 GF_{1}	15 April 1993	list
(30926) 1993 TL_{13}	14 October 1993	list
(32798) 1990 OA_{2}	29 July 1990	list
(32799) 1990 QN_{1}	22 August 1990	list
(32801) 1990 RF_{5}	15 September 1990	list
(32803) 1990 SR_{1}	18 September 1990	list
(32804) 1990 SO_{2}	17 September 1990	list
(32805) 1990 SM_{3}	18 September 1990	list
(32819) 1991 PM_{15}	8 August 1991	list
(32820) 1991 PU_{19}	8 August 1991	list
(32822) 1991 RB_{16}	15 September 1991	list
(32848) 1992 MD	29 June 1992	list
(32856) 1992 SA_{25}	30 September 1992	list
(35077) 1990 OT_{2}	30 July 1990	list
(35082) 1990 RJ_{3}	14 September 1990	list
(35085) 1990 SL_{11}	16 September 1990	list
(35101) 1991 PL_{16}	7 August 1991	list
(35103) 1991 RZ_{14}	15 September 1991	list

(35104) 1991 RP_{17}	11 September 1991	list
(35105) 1991 RP_{23}	15 September 1991	list
(35131) 1992 PE_{2}	2 August 1992	list
(35132) 1992 PY_{3}	2 August 1992	list
(35175) 1993 TJ_{21}	10 October 1993	list
(35176) 1993 TK_{21}	10 October 1993	list
(37574) 1990 QE_{6}	25 August 1990	list
(37576) 1990 QW_{9}	24 August 1990	list
(37577) 1990 RG	14 September 1990	list
(37578) 1990 RY_{2}	15 September 1990	list
(37581) 1990 SU_{15}	16 September 1990	list
(37590) 1991 RA_{14}	13 September 1991	list
(37605) 1992 PN_{2}	2 August 1992	list
(39533) 1990 QD_{3}	28 August 1990	list
(39534) 1990 RK_{1}	14 September 1990	list
(39560) 1992 PM_{2}	2 August 1992	list
(42488) 1991 RN_{17}	11 September 1991	list
(42489) 1991 RL_{18}	13 September 1991	list
(42499) 1992 PE_{3}	6 August 1992	list
(42513) 1993 SH_{15}	18 September 1993	list
(43788) 1990 RB_{3}	14 September 1990	list
(43799) 1991 PZ_{10}	7 August 1991	list
(43800) 1991 PP_{13}	5 August 1991	list
(43801) 1991 PL_{15}	8 August 1991	list
(43802) 1991 PY_{18}	10 August 1991	list

(43805) 1991 RQ_{5}	13 September 1991	list
(43807) 1991 RC_{11}	13 September 1991	list
(43808) 1991 RF_{11}	13 September 1991	list
(43809) 1991 RE_{14}	13 September 1991	list
(43810) 1991 RJ_{20}	14 September 1991	list
(43811) 1991 RA_{24}	11 September 1991	list
(43812) 1991 RJ_{29}	13 September 1991	list
(43823) 1992 SV_{24}	29 September 1992	list
(43824) 1992 SY_{24}	30 September 1992	list
(46552) 1990 RM_{1}	14 September 1990	list
(46564) 1991 RA_{11}	10 September 1991	list
(46565) 1991 RF_{17}	15 September 1991	list
(46566) 1991 RW_{21}	11 September 1991	list
(46567) 1991 RV_{23}	11 September 1991	list
(46569) 1991 SY_{1}	16 September 1991	list
(48446) 1990 RB_{1}	14 September 1990	list
(48454) 1991 PP_{12}	5 August 1991	list
(48455) 1991 PK_{13}	5 August 1991	list
(48459) 1991 RO_{5}	13 September 1991	list
(48460) 1991 RH_{6}	13 September 1991	list
(48463) 1991 RH_{14}	13 September 1991	list
(48464) 1991 RA_{17}	15 September 1991	list
(48465) 1991 RS_{20}	14 September 1991	list
(48466) 1991 RY_{29}	12 September 1991	list
(48542) 1993 TN_{13}	14 October 1993	list

(52286) 1990 QT_{1}	22 August 1990	list
(52287) 1990 QP_{4}	23 August 1990	list
(52299) 1991 NJ_{1}	12 July 1991	list
(52302) 1991 RL_{8}	12 September 1991	list
(52303) 1991 RU_{9}	10 September 1991	list
(52304) 1991 RB_{10}	12 September 1991	list
(52305) 1991 RR_{10}	10 September 1991	list
(52306) 1991 RF_{20}	14 September 1991	list
(52401) 1993 SS_{15}	19 September 1993	list
(55741) 1990 QZ_{3}	22 August 1990	list
(55752) 1991 PD_{12}	7 August 1991	list
(55754) 1991 RP_{18}	13 September 1991	list
(55792) 1993 SV_{3}	18 September 1993	list
(58166) 1990 OF_{3}	29 July 1990	list
(58167) 1990 QM_{3}	28 August 1990	list
(58169) 1990 SD_{3}	18 September 1990	list
(58173) 1990 SS_{10}	16 September 1990	list
(58174) 1990 SZ_{10}	20 September 1990	list
(58175) 1990 SE_{15}	17 September 1990	list
(58176) 1990 SN_{16}	17 September 1990	list
(58265) 1993 TJ_{12}	14 October 1993	list
(65682) 1990 QU_{2}	24 August 1990	list
(65683) 1990 QW_{5}	29 August 1990	list
(65684) 1990 QY_{5}	29 August 1990	list
(65691) 1991 PT_{10}	7 August 1991	list

(69315) 1992 UR_{2}	20 October 1992	list
(69329) 1993 GH_{1}	15 April 1993	list
(73683) 1990 RV_{3}	14 September 1990	list
(73684) 1990 SV	16 September 1990	list
(73694) 1991 RL_{15}	15 September 1991	list
(73695) 1991 RL_{17}	11 September 1991	list
(73696) 1991 RQ_{19}	14 September 1991	list
(73697) 1991 RT_{29}	12 September 1991	list
(73714) 1992 SW_{14}	30 September 1992	list
(79137) 1991 PD_{15}	6 August 1991	list
(85176) 1990 RP_{2}	15 September 1990	list
(85177) 1990 SE_{3}	18 September 1990	list
(85187) 1991 PC_{12}	7 August 1991	list
(85188) 1991 PK_{12}	7 August 1991	list
(85193) 1991 RD_{19}	14 September 1991	list
(85254) 1993 TG_{12}	14 October 1993	list
(90719) 1991 RZ_{5}	13 September 1991	list
(90720) 1991 RS_{19}	14 September 1991	list
(90721) 1991 RC_{29}	13 September 1991	list
(96184) 1990 QH_{3}	28 August 1990	list
(100020) 1990 QH_{4}	23 August 1990	list
(100035) 1991 PO_{8}	5 August 1991	list
(100036) 1991 PM_{14}	6 August 1991	list
(100038) 1991 RD_{13}	13 September 1991	list
(100039) 1991 RO_{16}	15 September 1991	list

(100040) 1991 RQ_{17}	11 September 1991	list
(100042) 1991 SJ_{2}	16 September 1991	list
(118174) 1991 RO_{24}	12 September 1991	list
(120457) 1990 QZ_{2}	28 August 1990	list
(129460) 1992 PW_{2}	6 August 1992	list
(147957) 1993 TM_{21}	10 October 1993	list
(160510) 1990 RG_{1}	14 September 1990	list
(160511) 1990 SD_{11}	16 September 1990	list
(160514) 1991 PQ_{9}	7 August 1991	list
(168319) 1990 RW_{2}	15 September 1990	list
(200085) 1991 RR_{19}	14 September 1991	list
(204966) 1990 QX_{3}	22 August 1990	list
(233972) 1992 PZ_{5}	3 August 1992	list
(343827) 2011 HA_{24}	11 September 1991	list
Co-discovery made with:^{A} N. G. Thomas^{B} D. H. Levy^{C} J. A. Brown^{D} C. S. Shoemaker

== See also ==
- List of minor planet discoverers § H. E. Holt
