= Norman G. Thomas =

American astronomer (1930–2020)

Minor planets discovered: 55
see § List of discovered minor planets

Norman Gene Thomas (May 1, 1930 – May 19, 2020) was an American astronomer and discoverer of minor planets.

He worked at Lowell Observatory using the blink comparator alongside Robert Burnham Jr., author of the famous three-volume Celestial Handbook.

He is credited by the Minor Planet Center with the discovery of 55 numbered minor planets during 1964–1989, including the Apollo asteroids 4544 Xanthus and 4581 Asclepius, as well as the Amor asteroid 3352 McAuliffe.

The main-belt asteroid 2555 Thomas, discovered by Edward Bowell at Anderson Mesa Station in 1980, was named in his honor. Naming citation was published on 8 April 1982 (M.P.C. 6835).

== List of discovered minor planets ==
2089 Cetacea	November 9, 1977
2366 Aaryn	January 10, 1981
2527 Gregory	September 3, 1981
2556 Louise	February 8, 1981
2557 Putnam ^{[1]}	September 26, 1981
2558 Viv	September 26, 1981
2612 Kathryn	February 28, 1979
2683 Brian	January 10, 1981
2684 Douglas	January 3, 1981
2764 Moeller	February 8, 1981
2779 Mary	February 6, 1981
2895 Memnon	January 10, 1981
2927 Alamosa	October 5, 1981
2933 Amber	April 18, 1983
2999 Dante	February 6, 1981
3117 Niepce	February 11, 1983
3151 Talbot	April 18, 1983
3256 Daguerre ^{[1]}	September 26, 1981
3352 McAuliffe	February 6, 1981
3367 Alex	February 15, 1983

3397 Leyla ^{[2]}	December 8, 1964
3413 Andriana	February 15, 1983
3467 Bernheim	September 26, 1981
3525 Paul	February 15, 1983
3561 Devine	April 18, 1983
3580 Avery	February 15, 1983
3584 Aisha	October 5, 1981
3614 Tumilty	January 12, 1983
3621 Curtis	September 26, 1981
3807 Pagels ^{[1]}	September 26, 1981
3976 Lise	May 6, 1983
4193 Salanave ^{[1]}	September 26, 1981
4198 Panthera	February 11, 1983
4331 Hubbard	April 18, 1983
4544 Xanthus ^{[3]}	March 31, 1989
4568 Menkaure	September 2, 1983
4581 Asclepius ^{[3]}	March 31, 1989
4967 Glia	February 11, 1983
5249 Giza	April 18, 1983
5461 Autumn	April 18, 1983

5864 Montgolfier	September 2, 1983
6062 Vespa	May 6, 1983
6174 Polybius	October 4, 1983
7275 Earlcarpenter	February 15, 1983
(7380) 1981 RF	September 3, 1981
(7990) 1981 SN1	September 26, 1981
(8469) 1981 TZ	October 5, 1981
(9157) 1983 RB4	September 2, 1983
(9534) 1981 TP	October 4, 1981
(10706) 1981 SE2	September 26, 1981
(11018) 1983 CZ2	February 15, 1983
(12193) 1979 EL	March 4, 1979
(12667) 1979 DF	February 28, 1979
(19118) 1981 SD2	September 26, 1981
(29123) 1983 RA4	September 2, 1983
^{1} with Brian A. Skiff^{2} with Robert Burnham Jr.^{3} with Henry E. Holt
