= 4581 Asclepius =

Sub-kilometer-sized asteroid

Discovery
- Discovered by: H. E. Holt; N. G. Thomas
- Discovery site: Palomar Obs.
- Discovery date: 31 March 1989

Designations
- Pronunciation: /əˈskliːpiəs/
- Named after: Asclepius (Greek mythology)
- Alternative designations: 1989 FC
- Minor planet category: Apollo; NEO; PHA

Orbital characteristics
- Epoch 28 May 2014 (JD 2456805.5)
- Uncertainty parameter 0
- Observation arc: 27.27 yr (9,959 days)
- Aphelion: 1.3874 AU
- Perihelion: 0.6574 AU
- Semi-major axis: 1.0224 AU
- Eccentricity: 0.3570
- Orbital period (sidereal): 1.03 yr (378 days)
- Mean anomaly: 194.55°
- Mean motion: 0° 57^{m} 12.24^{s} / day
- Inclination: 4.9190°
- Longitude of ascending node: 180.30°
- Argument of perihelion: 255.30°
- Earth MOID: 0.0036 AU

Physical characteristics
- Dimensions: 300 m
- Absolute magnitude (H): 20.7

4581 Asclepius /əˈskliːpiəs/, provisional designation 1989 FC, is a sub-kilometer-sized asteroid, classified as near-Earth object and potentially hazardous asteroid of the Apollo group that makes close orbital passes with Earth. Discovered on 31 March 1989 by American astronomers Henry Holt and Norman Thomas at Palomar Observatory, Asclepius is named after the Greek god of medicine and healing.

Asclepius passed by Earth on 22 March 1989 at a distance of 0.00457 AU (684,000 km; 425,000 mi). Although this exceeds the Moon's orbital radius, the close pass received attention at that time. "On the cosmic scale of things, that was a close call", said Dr. Henry Holt. Geophysicists estimate that collision with Asclepius would release energy comparable to the explosion of a 600 megaton atomic bomb. The asteroid was discovered 31 March 1989, nine days after its closest approach to the Earth.

Subsequent discoveries revealed that a whole class of such objects exists. Close approaches by objects the size of Asclepius pass by every two or three years, undetected until the start of computerized near-Earth object searches.

On 24 March 2051, the asteroid will pass 0.0123 AU (1,840,000 km; 1,140,000 mi) from the Earth. It will be the eighth pass of less than 30 million km in this century. JPL shows that the uncertainty region of the asteroid will cause it to most likely pass from 0.02 AU to 0.17 AU from the Earth in 2135.
