= 9969 Braille =

Asteroid

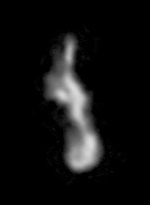
- Braille imaged by Deep Space 1 in 1999

Discovery
- Discovered by: E. F. Helin; K. J. Lawrence
- Discovery site: Palomar Observatory
- Discovery date: 27 May 1992

Designations
- Pronunciation: /ˈbreɪl/
- Named after: Louis Braille (inventor of braille)
- Alternative designations: 1992 KD
- Minor planet category: Mars-crosser

Orbital characteristics
- Epoch 4 September 2017 (JD 2458000.5)
- Uncertainty parameter 0
- Observation arc: 24.93 yr (9,107 days)
- Aphelion: 3.3557 AU
- Perihelion: 1.3263 AU
- Semi-major axis: 2.3410 AU
- Eccentricity: 0.4334
- Orbital period (sidereal): 3.58 yr (1,308 days)
- Mean anomaly: 16.880°
- Inclination: 28.999°
- Longitude of ascending node: 241.95°
- Argument of perihelion: 356.11°
- Earth MOID: 0.3154 AU · 122.9 LD

Physical characteristics
- Dimensions: 1.600±0.511 km 1.64 km (derived); 2.1 km × 1 km × 1 km
- Mass: 7.8 trillion kg
- Mean density: 3.9 g cm^{−3}
- Synodic rotation period: 226 h 226.4 h
- Geometric albedo: 0.1289±0.2441; 0.18 (assumed)
- Spectral type: SMASS = Q
- Absolute magnitude (H): 15.8

9969 Braille, provisional designation 1992 KD, is an eccentric and elongated asteroid from the innermost regions of the asteroid belt, classified as Mars-crosser and slow rotator, approximately 1–2 kilometers in diameter. It was discovered in 1992, by astronomers at Palomar Observatory and later named after Louis Braille, the inventor of the writing system for the blind. It was photographed in closeup by the spacecraft Deep Space 1 in 1999, but a malfunction resulted in indistinct images.

== Discovery and naming ==
Discovered on May 27, 1992, by E. F. Helin and K. J. Lawrence working at the Palomar Observatory as part of NASA's Planet-Crossing Asteroid Survey, it was given the provisional designation 1992 KD. Later, it was named Braille in honour of Louis Braille as suggested by Kennedy Space Center software engineer Kerry Babcock in The Planetary Society's contest titled "Name That Asteroid". The official naming citation was published by the Minor Planet Center on 28 July 1999 (M.P.C. 35492).

== Orbit ==
Braille has an unusually inclined orbit, and belongs to the somewhat rare class of asteroids known as Mars-crossing asteroids. Simulations of its orbit by scientists of the Deep Space 1 project predict that it will evolve into an Earth-crossing orbit in about 4000 years. Although its closest approach to the Sun is closer than Mars orbit, its highly elliptical orbit takes it almost half-way to Jupiter at its apoapsis, and as such its semi-major axis is too large for it to be classified as an Amor asteroid.

== Physical characteristics ==
Braille is a Q-type asteroid, composed mostly of olivine and pyroxene. Early ground-based observations had suggested that it could have been a V-type asteroid with similarities of composition between it and the much larger 4 Vesta. The asteroid is irregularly shaped, measuring approximately 2.1 km × 1 km × 1 km.

== Exploration ==
Animation of Deep Space 1's trajectory from 24 October 1998 to 31 December 2003 Deep Space 1 · 9969 Braille · Earth · 19P/Borrelly

Detailed information about Braille comes primarily from the Deep Space 1 probe, which passed within 26 km of the asteroid on July 29, 1999, and from extensive ground based observations done in conjunction with the mission. By the time Deep Space 1 reached Braille, its ultraviolet spectrometer had failed, but it did return two CCD images of medium resolution and three infrared spectra during the encounter. However, although the probe came within 26 km of Braille, the images and spectra were taken from an approximate distance of 14000 km, due to problems with the tracking system.

The main purpose of the Deep Space 1 mission was technology testing, but the encounter with Braille was of strong scientific value. No lone asteroid as small as Braille had previously been observed from such a short distance.
