= Deep Space 1 =

NASA flyby mission to asteroid Braille and Comet Borrelly (1998–2001)

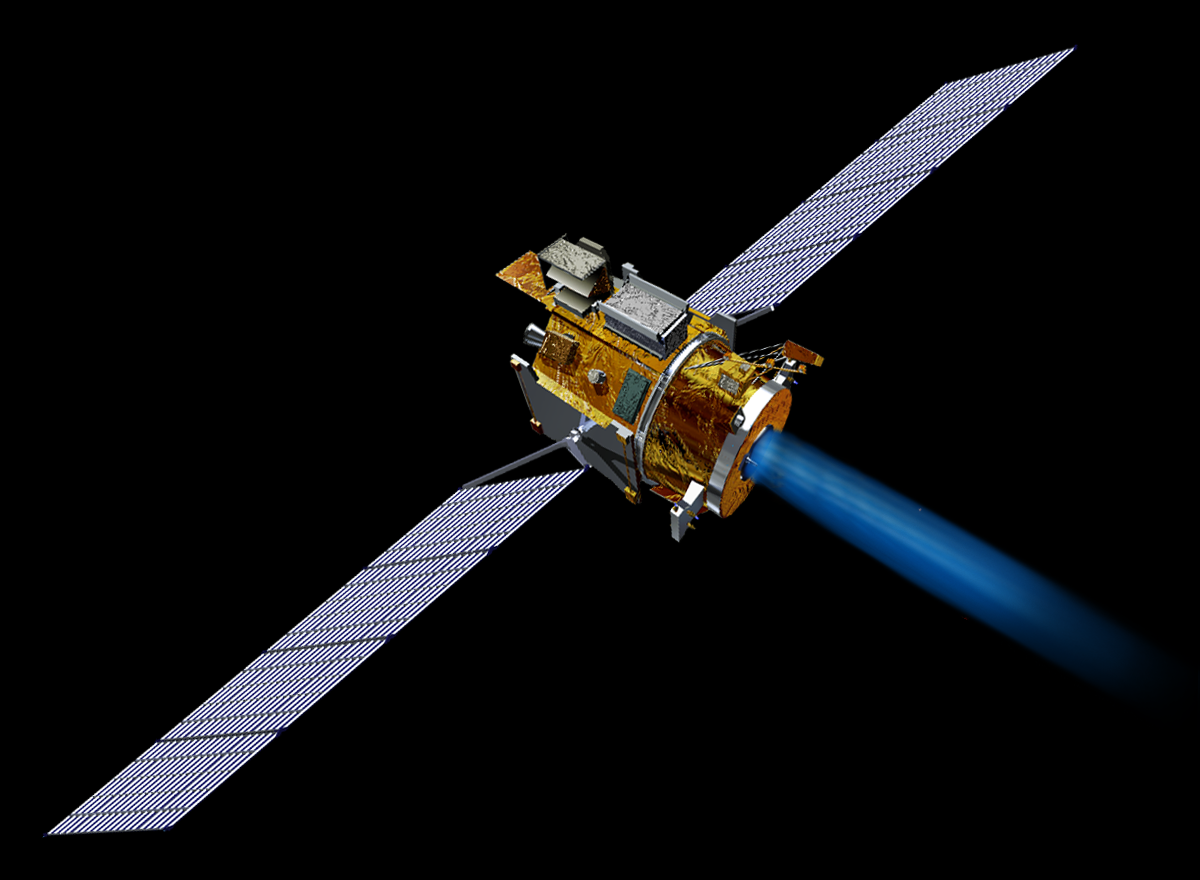
- Artist concept of Deep Space 1 firing its ion thrusters
- Mission type: Technology demonstrator
- Operator: NASA / JPL
- COSPAR ID: 1998-061A
- SATCAT no.: 25508
- Website: jpl.nasa.gov
- Mission duration: 3 years, 1 month and 24 days

Spacecraft properties
- Manufacturer: Orbital Sciences
- Launch mass: 486 kg (1,071 lb)
- Dry mass: 373 kg (822 lb)
- Dimensions: 2.1 × 11.8 × 2.5 m (6.9 × 38.6 × 8.2 ft)
- Power: 2,500 watts

Start of mission
- Launch date: 24 October 1998, 12:08 UTC
- Rocket: Delta II 7326; D-261
- Launch site: Cape Canaveral SLC-17A
- Contractor: Boeing

End of mission
- Disposal: Decommissioned
- Deactivated: 18 December 2001, 20:00 UTC

Flyby of 9969 Braille
- Closest approach: 29 July 1999, 04:46 UTC
- Distance: 26 km (16 mi)

Flyby of 19P/Borrelly
- Closest approach: 22 September 2001, 22:29:33 UTC
- Distance: 2,171 km (1,349 mi)
Instruments
- MICAS: Miniature Integrated Camera-Spectrometer
- PEPE: Plasma Experiment for Planetary Exploration
- IDS: Ion Propulsion System (IPS) Diagnostic Subsystem
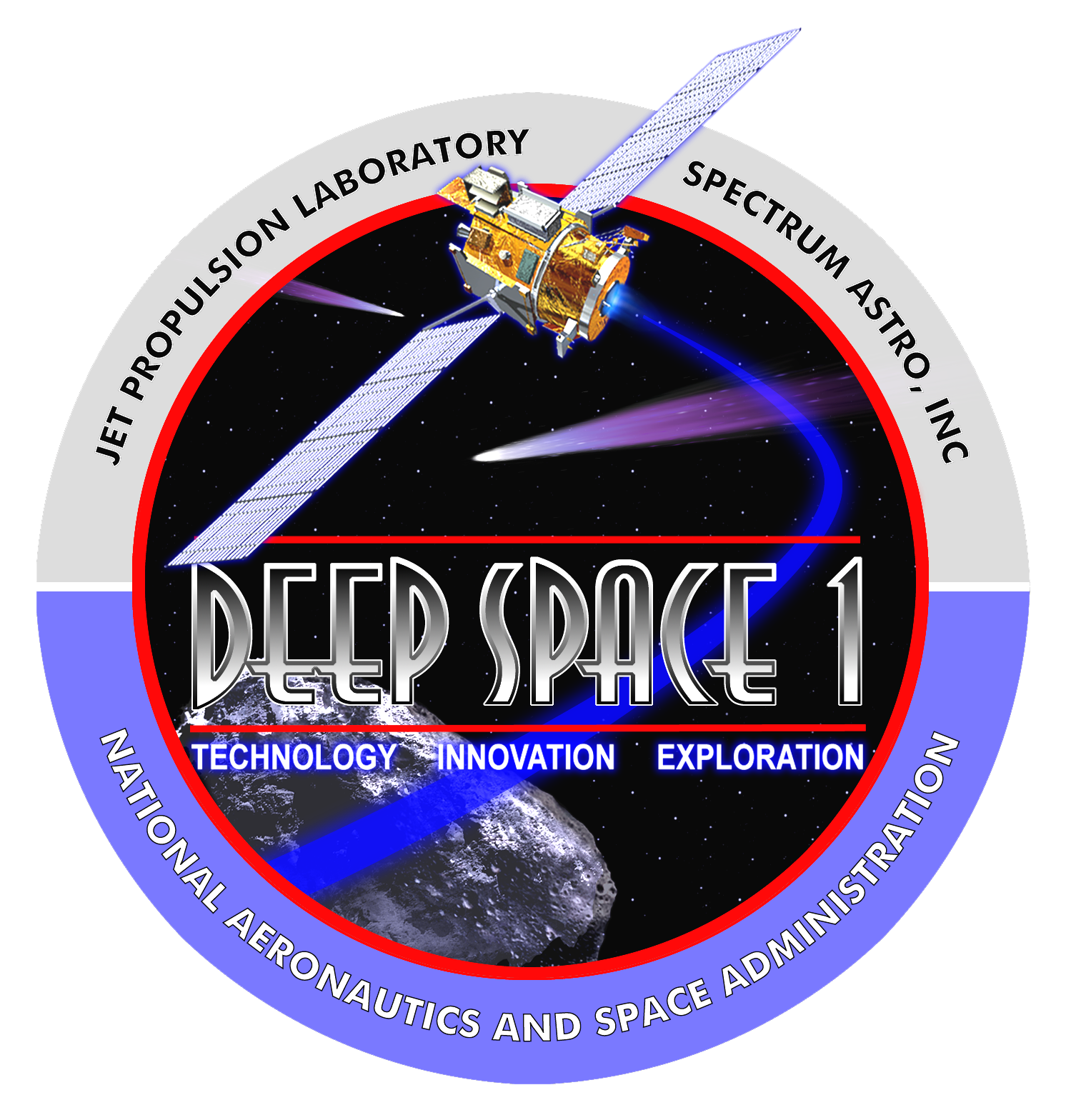
- DS1 mission logo New Millennium program

Deep Space 1 (DS1) was a NASA technology demonstration spacecraft which flew by an asteroid and a comet. It was part of the New Millennium Program, dedicated to testing advanced technologies.

Launched on 24 October 1998, the Deep Space 1 spacecraft carried out a flyby of asteroid 9969 Braille, which was its primary science target. The mission was extended twice to include an encounter with comet 19P/Borrelly and further engineering testing. Problems during its initial stages and with its star tracker led to repeated changes in mission configuration. While the flyby of the asteroid was only a partial success, the encounter with the comet retrieved valuable information.

The Deep Space series was continued by the Deep Space 2 probes, which were launched in January 1999 piggybacked on the Mars Polar Lander and were intended to strike the surface of Mars (though contact was lost and the mission failed). Deep Space 1 was the first NASA spacecraft to use ion propulsion rather than the traditional chemical-powered rockets.

== Technologies ==
The purpose of Deep Space 1 was technology development and validation for future missions; 12 technologies were tested:

1. Solar Electric Propulsion
2. Solar Concentrator Arrays
3. Multi-functional Structure
4. Miniature Integrated Camera and Imaging Spectrometer
5. Ion and Electron Spectrometer
6. Small Deep Space Transponder
7. Ka-Band Solid State Power Amplifier
8. Beacon Monitor Operations
9. Autonomous Remote Agent
10. Low Power Electronics
11. Power Actuation and Switching Module
12. Autonomous Navigation

=== Autonav ===
The Autonav system, developed by NASA's Jet Propulsion Laboratory, takes images of known bright asteroids. The asteroids in the inner Solar System move in relation to other bodies at a noticeable, predictable speed. Thus a spacecraft can determine its relative position by tracking such asteroids across the star background, which appears fixed over such timescales. Two or more asteroids let the spacecraft triangulate its position; two or more positions in time let the spacecraft determine its trajectory. Existing spacecraft are tracked by their interactions with the transmitters of the NASA Deep Space Network (DSN), in effect an inverse GPS. However, DSN tracking requires many skilled operators, and the DSN is overburdened by its use as a communications network. The use of Autonav reduces mission cost and DSN demands.

The Autonav system can also be used in reverse, tracking the position of bodies relative to the spacecraft. This is used to acquire targets for the scientific instruments. The spacecraft is programmed with the target's coarse location. After initial acquisition, Autonav keeps the subject in frame, even commandeering the spacecraft's attitude control. The next spacecraft to use Autonav was Deep Impact.

=== SCARLET concentrating solar array ===
Primary power for the mission was produced by a new solar array technology, the Solar Concentrator Array with Refractive Linear Element Technology (SCARLET), which uses linear Fresnel lenses made of silicone to concentrate sunlight onto solar cells. ABLE Engineering developed the concentrator technology and built the solar array for DS1, with Entech Inc, who supplied the Fresnel optics, and the NASA Glenn Research Center. The activity was sponsored by the Ballistic Missile Defense Organization, developed originally for the SSI – Conestoga 1620 payload, METEOR. The concentrating lens technology was combined with dual-junction solar cells, which had considerably better performance than the GaAs solar cells that were the state of the art at the time of the mission launch.

The SCARLET arrays generated 2.5 kilowatts at 1 AU, with less size and weight than conventional arrays.

=== NSTAR ion engine ===
Although ion engines had been developed at NASA since the late 1950s, with the exception of the SERT missions in the 1960s, the technology had not been demonstrated in flight on United States spacecraft, though hundreds of Hall-effect engines had been used on Soviet and Russian spacecraft. This lack of a performance history in space meant that despite the potential savings in propellant mass, the technology was considered too experimental to be used for high-cost missions. Furthermore, unforeseen side effects of ion propulsion might in some way interfere with typical scientific experiments, such as fields and particle measurements. Therefore, it was a primary mission of the Deep Space 1 demonstration to show long-duration use of an ion thruster on a scientific mission.

The NASA Solar Technology Application Readiness (NSTAR) electrostatic ion thruster, developed at NASA Glenn, achieves a specific impulse of 1000–3000 seconds. This is an order of magnitude higher than traditional space propulsion methods, resulting in a mass savings of approximately half. This leads to much cheaper launch vehicles. Although the engine produces just 92 millinewtons (0.33 oz_{f}) thrust at maximal power (2,100 W on DS1), the craft achieved high speeds because ion engines thrust continuously for long periods.

The next spacecraft to use NSTAR engines was Dawn, with three redundant units.

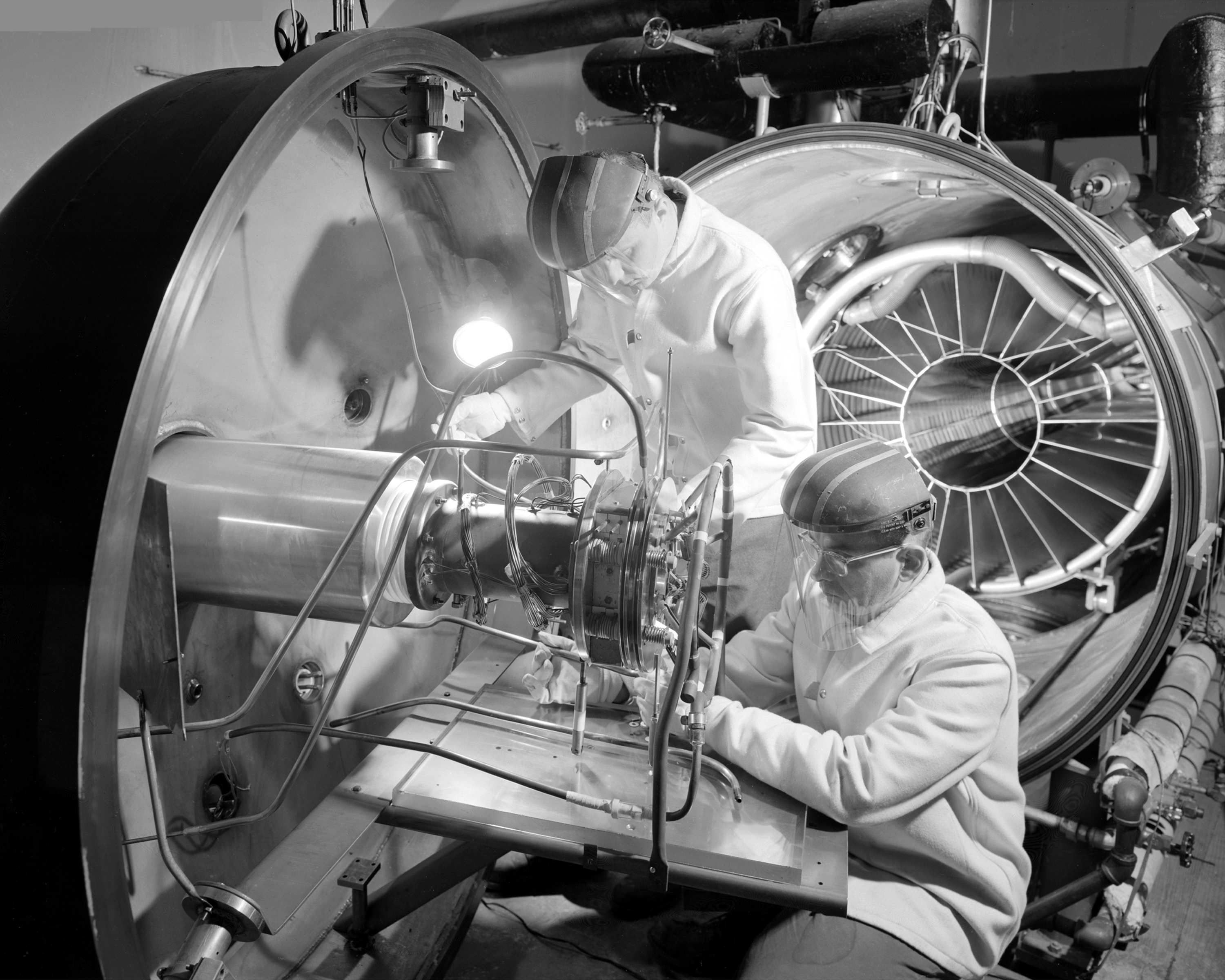
Technicians installing ion engine No. 1 in the High Vacuum Tank in the Electric Propulsion Research Building, 1959

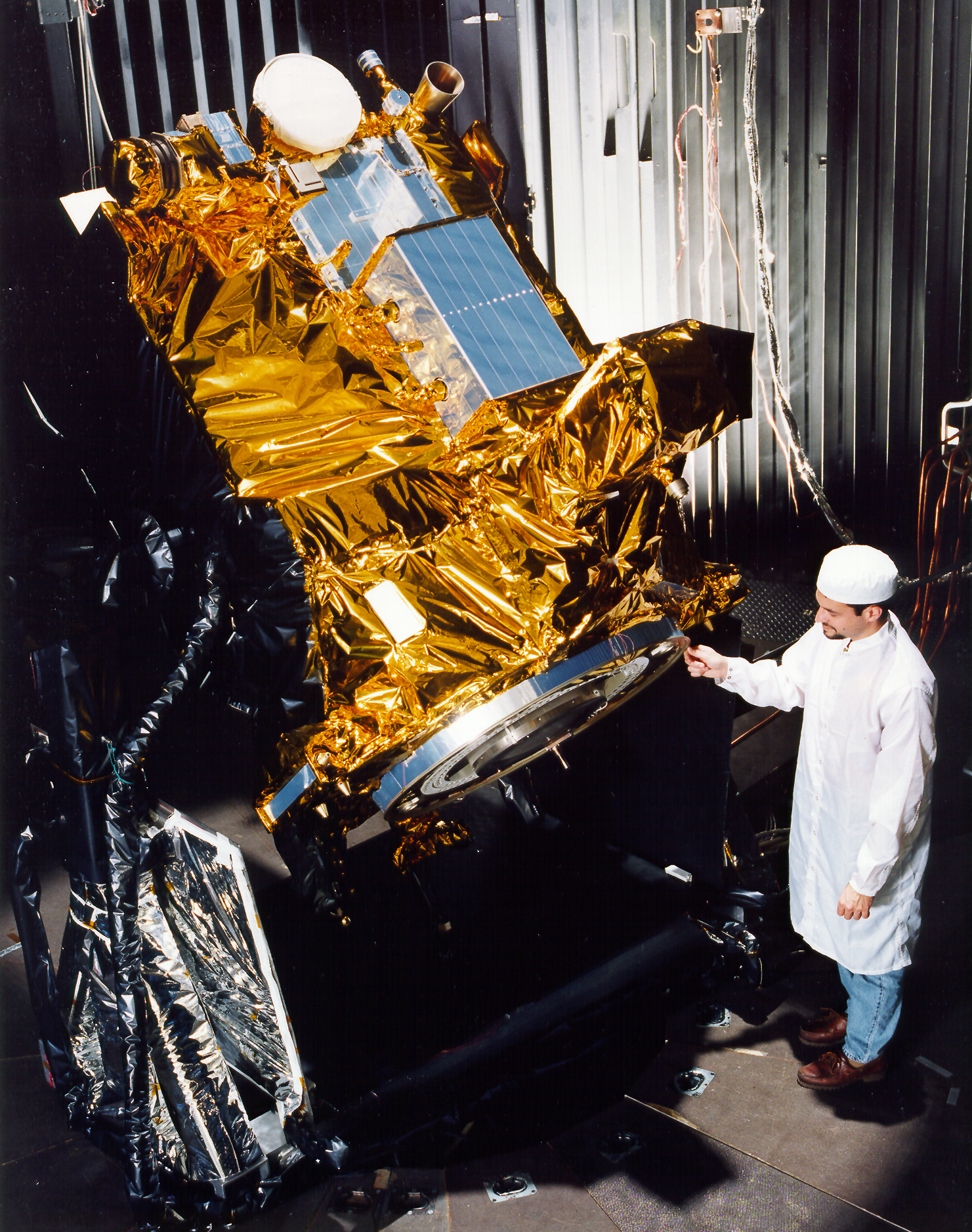
The fully assembled Deep Space 1

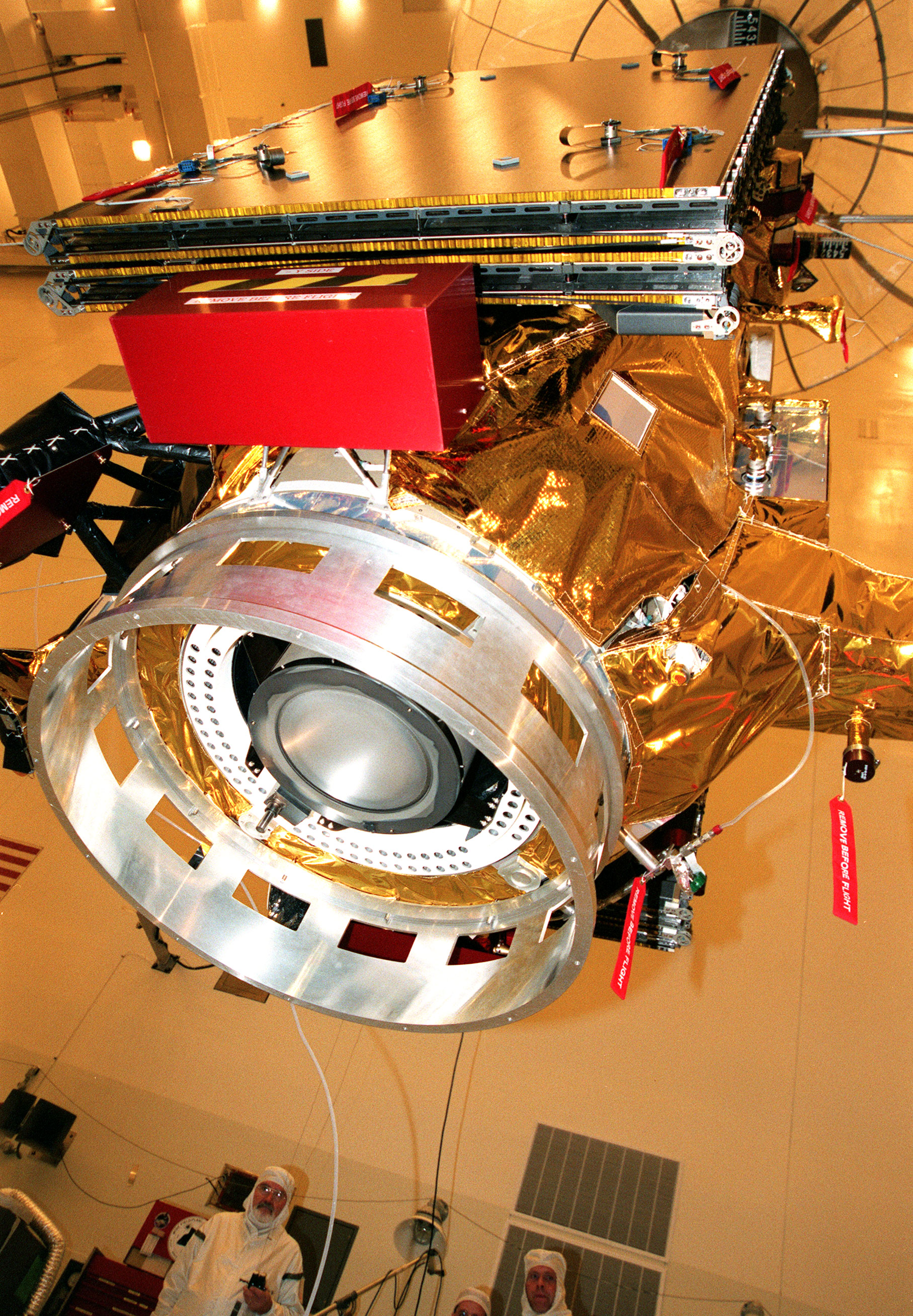
Deep Space 1 experimental solar-powered ion propulsion engine

=== Remote Agent ===
Remote Agent (RAX), remote intelligent self-repair software developed at NASA's Ames Research Center and the Jet Propulsion Laboratory, was the first artificial-intelligence control system to control a spacecraft without human supervision. Remote Agent successfully demonstrated the ability to plan onboard activities and correctly diagnose and respond to simulated faults in spacecraft components through its built-in REPL environment. Autonomous control will enable future spacecraft to operate at greater distances from Earth and to carry out more sophisticated science-gathering activities in deep space. Components of the Remote Agent software have been used to support other NASA missions. Major components of Remote Agent were a robust planner (EUROPA), a plan-execution system (EXEC) and a model-based diagnostic system (Livingstone). EUROPA was used as a ground-based planner for the Mars Exploration Rovers. EUROPA II was used to support the Phoenix Mars lander and the Mars Science Laboratory. Livingstone2 was flown as an experiment aboard Earth Observing-1 and on an F/A-18 Hornet at NASA's Dryden Flight Research Center.

=== Beacon Monitor ===
Another method for reducing DSN burdens is the Beacon Monitor experiment. During the long cruise periods of the mission, spacecraft operations are essentially suspended. Instead of data, Deep Space 1 transmitted a carrier signal on a predetermined frequency. Without data decoding, the carrier could be detected by much simpler ground antennas and receivers. If DS1 detected an anomaly, it changed the carrier between four tones, based on urgency. Ground receivers then signal operators to divert DSN resources. This prevented skilled operators and expensive hardware from babysitting an unburdened mission operating nominally. A similar system was used on the New Horizons Pluto probe to keep costs down during its ten-year cruise from Jupiter to Pluto.

=== SDST ===
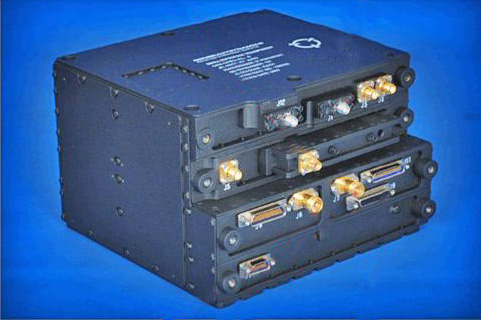
A Small Deep Space Transponder

The Small Deep Space Transponder (SDST) is a compact and lightweight radio-communications system. Aside from using miniaturized components, the SDST is capable of communicating over the K_{a} band. Because this band is higher in frequency than bands currently in use by deep-space missions, the same amount of data can be sent by smaller equipment in space and on the ground. Conversely, existing DSN antennas can split time among more missions. At the time of launch, the DSN had a small number of K_{a} receivers installed on an experimental basis; K_{a} operations and missions are increasing.

The SDST has since been used on many other space missions such as the Mars Science Laboratory (the Mars rover Curiosity).

=== PEPE ===
Once at a target, DS1 senses the particle environment with the PEPE (Plasma Experiment for Planetary Exploration) instrument. This instrument measured the flux of ions and electrons as a function of their energy and direction. The composition of the ions was determined by using a time-of-flight mass spectrometer.

=== MICAS ===
The MICAS (Miniature Integrated Camera And Spectrometer) instrument combined visible light imaging with infrared and ultraviolet spectroscopy to determine chemical composition. All channels share a 10 cm (3.9 in) telescope, which uses a silicon carbide mirror.

Both PEPE and MICAS were similar in capabilities to larger instruments or suites of instruments on other spacecraft. They were designed to be smaller and require lower power than those used on previous missions.

== Mission overview ==
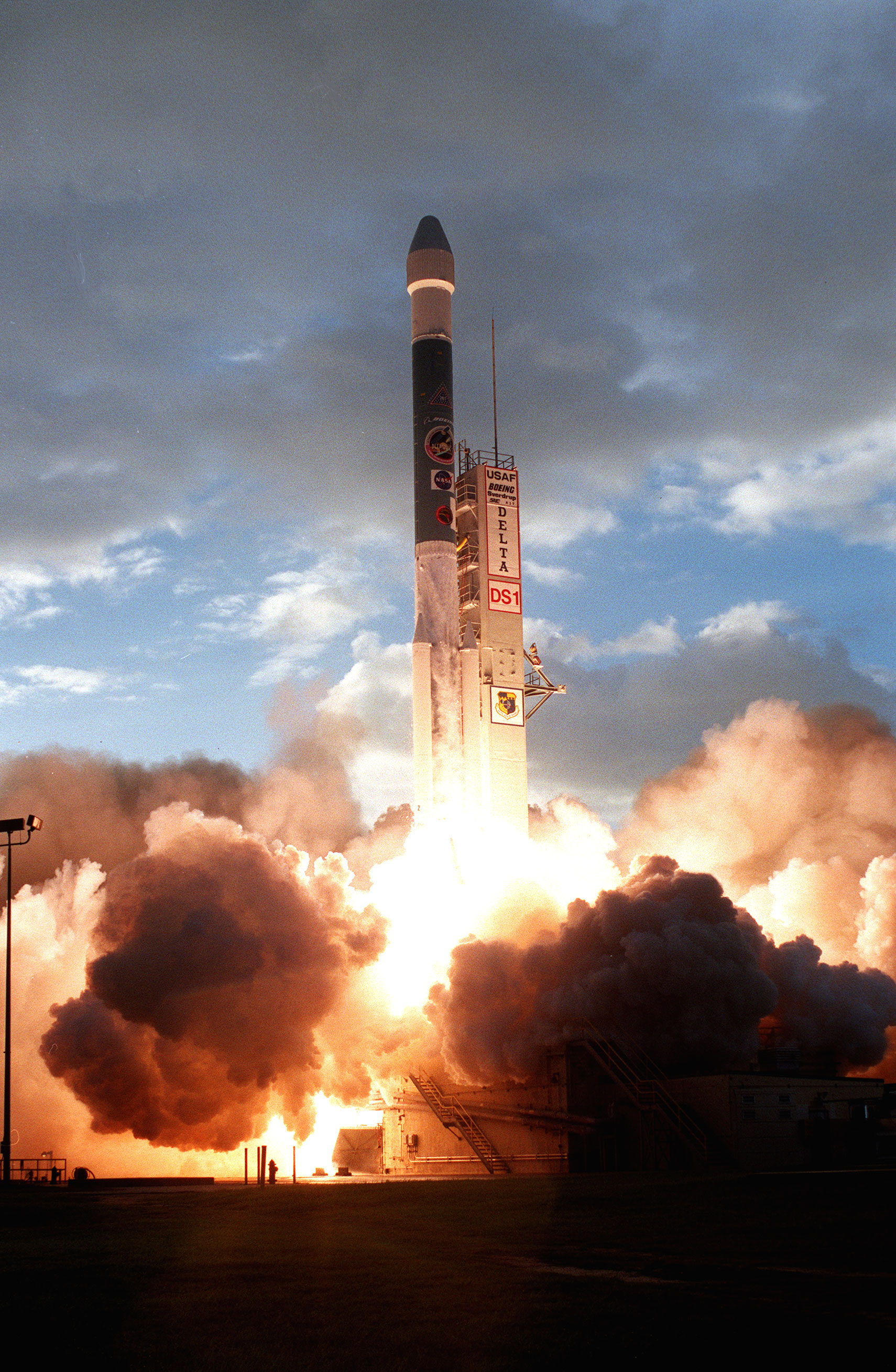
Launch of DS1 aboard a Delta II from Cape Canaveral SLC-17A

Animation of DS1's trajectory from 24 October 1998 to 31 December 2003
Deep Space 1 · 9969 Braille · Earth · 19P/Borrelly

Prior to launch, Deep Space 1 was intended to visit comet 76P/West–Kohoutek–Ikemura and asteroid 3352 McAuliffe. Because of the delayed launch, the targets were changed to asteroid 9969 Braille (at the time called 1992 KD) and comet 19P/Borrelly, with comet 107P/Wilson–Harrington being added following the early success of the mission. It achieved an impaired flyby of Braille and, due to problems with the star tracker, abandoned targeting Wilson–Harrington to maintain its flyby of comet 19P/Borrelly, which was successful. An August 2002 flyby of asteroid 1999 KK1 as another extended mission was considered, but ultimately was not advanced on the basis that the scientific justification was not sufficiently strong when considering risk and cost. During the mission, high quality infrared spectra of Mars were also taken.

=== Results and achievements ===
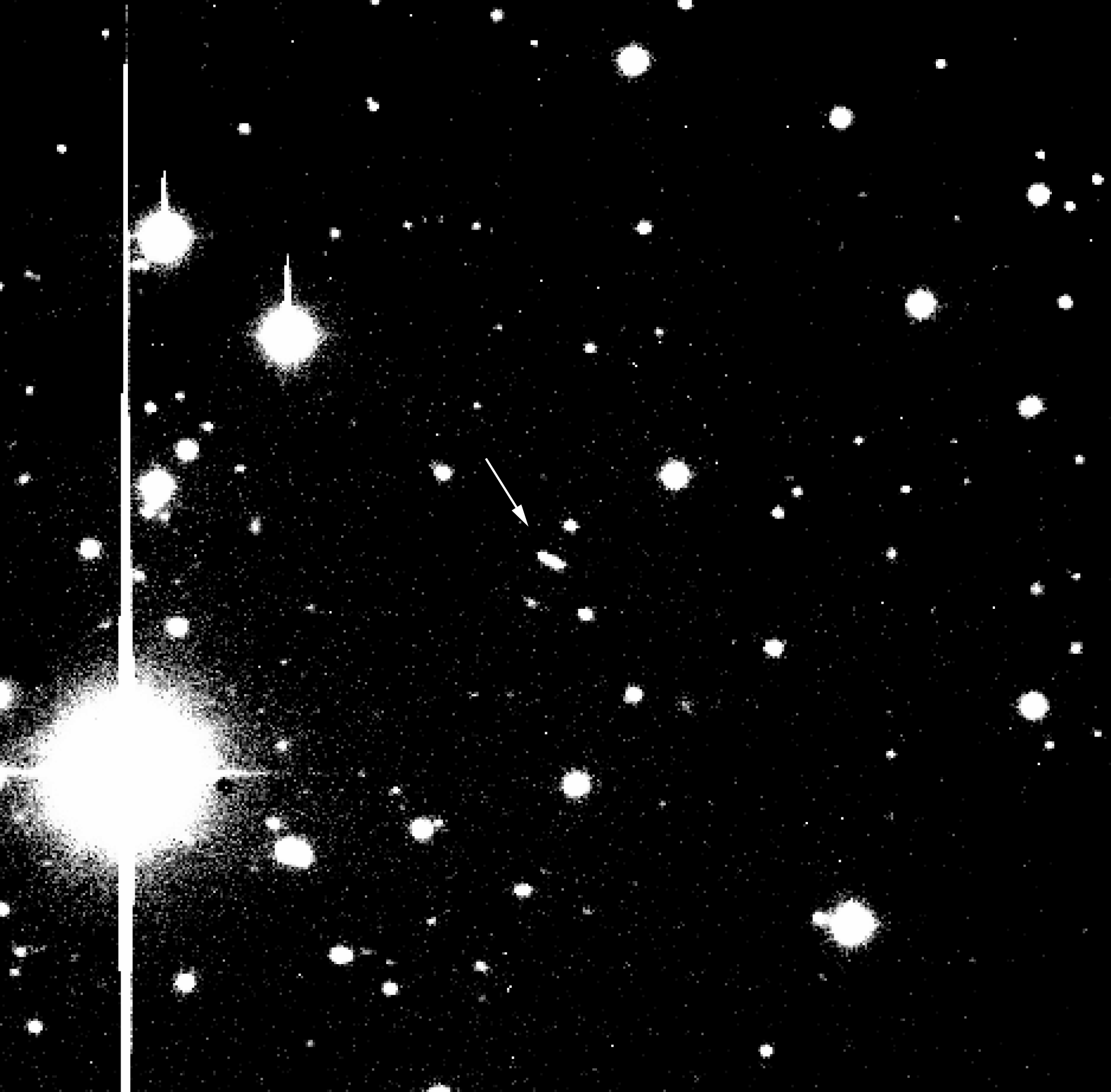
Deep Space-1 as seen from Hale Telescope while at distance of 3.7 million km (2.3 million mi)

The ion propulsion engine initially failed after 4.5 minutes of operation. However, it was later restored to action and performed excellently. Early in the mission, material ejected during launch vehicle separation caused the closely spaced ion extraction grids to short-circuit. The contamination was eventually cleared, as the material was eroded by electrical arcing, sublimed by outgassing, or simply allowed to drift out. This was achieved by repeatedly restarting the engine in an engine repair mode, arcing across trapped material.

It was thought that the ion engine exhaust might interfere with other spacecraft systems, such as radio communications or the science instruments. The PEPE detectors had a secondary function to monitor such effects from the engine. No interference was found although the flux of ions from the thruster prevented PEPE from observing ions below approximately 20 eV.

Another failure was the loss of the star tracker. The star tracker determines spacecraft orientation by comparing the star field to its internal charts. The mission was saved when the MICAS camera was reprogrammed to substitute for the star tracker. Although MICAS is more sensitive, its field-of-view is an order of magnitude smaller, creating a greater information processing burden. Ironically, the star tracker was an off-the-shelf component, expected to be highly reliable.

Without a working star tracker, ion thrusting was temporarily suspended. The loss of thrust time forced the cancellation of a flyby past comet 107P/Wilson–Harrington.

The Autonav system required occasional manual corrections. Most problems were in identifying objects that were too dim, or were difficult to identify because of brighter objects causing diffraction spikes and reflections in the camera, causing Autonav to misidentify targets.

The Remote Agent system was presented with three simulated failures on the spacecraft and correctly handled each event.

1. a failed electronics unit, which Remote Agent fixed by reactivating the unit.
2. a failed sensor providing false information, which Remote Agent recognized as unreliable and therefore correctly ignored.
3. an attitude control thruster (a small engine for controlling the spacecraft's orientation) stuck in the "off" position, which Remote Agent detected and compensated for by switching to a mode that did not rely on that thruster.

Overall this constituted a successful demonstration of fully autonomous planning, diagnosis, and recovery.

The MICAS instrument was a design success, but the ultraviolet channel failed due to an electrical fault. Later in the mission, after the star tracker failure, MICAS assumed this duty as well. This caused continual interruptions in its scientific use during the remaining mission, including the Comet Borrelly encounter.

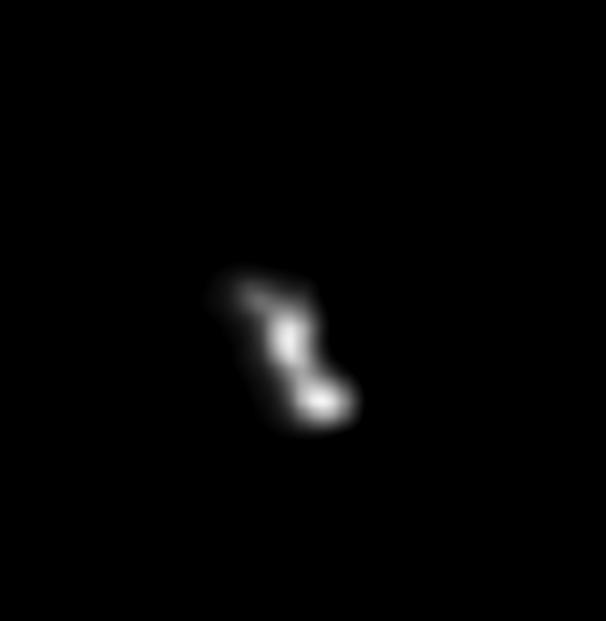
9969 Braille as imaged by DS1

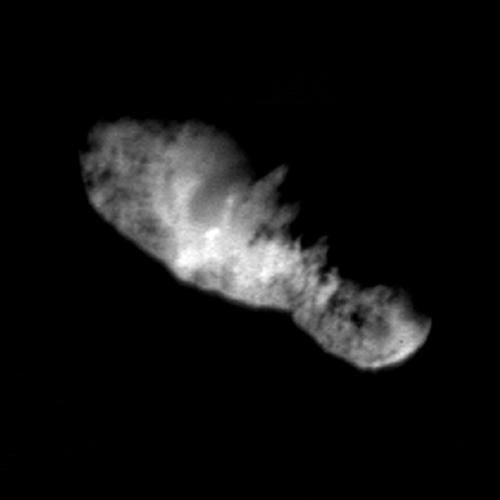
Comet 19P/Borrelly imaged just 160 seconds before DS1's closest approach

The flyby of the asteroid 9969 Braille was only a partial success. Deep Space 1 was intended to perform the flyby at 56,000 km/h (35,000 mph) at only 240 m (790 ft) from the asteroid. Due to technical difficulties, including a software crash shortly before approach, the craft instead passed Braille at a distance of 26 km (16 mi). This, plus Braille's lower albedo, meant that the asteroid was not bright enough for the Autonav to focus the camera in the right direction, and the picture shoot was delayed by almost an hour.

However, the flyby of Comet Borrelly was a great success and returned extremely detailed images of the comet's surface. Such images were of higher resolution than the only previous pictures of a comet – Halley's Comet, taken by the Giotto spacecraft. The PEPE instrument reported that the comet's solar wind interaction was offset from the nucleus. This is believed to be due to emission of jets, which were not distributed evenly across the comet's surface.

Despite having no debris shields, the spacecraft survived the comet passage intact. Once again, the sparse comet jets did not appear to point towards the spacecraft. Deep Space 1 then entered its second extended mission phase, focused on retesting the spacecraft's hardware technologies. The focus of this mission phase was on the ion engine systems. The spacecraft eventually ran out of hydrazine fuel for its attitude control thrusters. The highly efficient ion thruster had a sufficient amount of propellant left to perform attitude control in addition to main propulsion, thus allowing the mission to continue.

During late October and early November 1999, during the spacecraft's post-Braille encounter coast phase, Deep Space 1 observed Mars with its MICAS instrument. Although this was a very distant flyby, the instrument did succeed in taking multiple infrared spectra of the planet.

=== Current status ===
Deep Space 1 succeeded in its primary and secondary objectives, returning valuable science data and images. DS1's ion engines were shut down on 18 December 2001 at approximately 20:00:00 UTC, signaling the end of the mission. On-board communications were set to remain in active mode in case the craft should be needed in the future. However, attempts to resume contact in March 2002 were unsuccessful. It remains within the Solar System, in orbit around the Sun.

== Statistics ==
- Launch mass: 486 kg (1,071 lb)
- Dry mass: 373 kg (822 lb)
- Fuel: 31 kg (68 lb) of hydrazine for attitude control thrusters; 82 kg (181 lb) of xenon for the NSTAR ion engine
- Power: 2,500 watts, of which 2,100 watts powers the ion engine
- Prime contractor: Spectrum Astro, later acquired by General Dynamics, and later sold to Orbital Sciences Corporation
- Launch vehicle: Boeing Delta II 7326
- Launch site: Cape Canaveral Air Force Station Space Launch Complex 17A
- Total cost: US$149.7 million
- Development cost: US$94.8 million
- Personnel:
  - Project manager: David Lehman
  - Mission manager: Philip Varghese
  - Chief mission engineer and deputy mission manager: Marc Rayman
  - Project scientist: Robert Nelson

== See also ==
- Solar panels on spacecraft
- List of minor planets and comets visited by spacecraft
