= 19P/Borrelly =

Jupiter-family comet

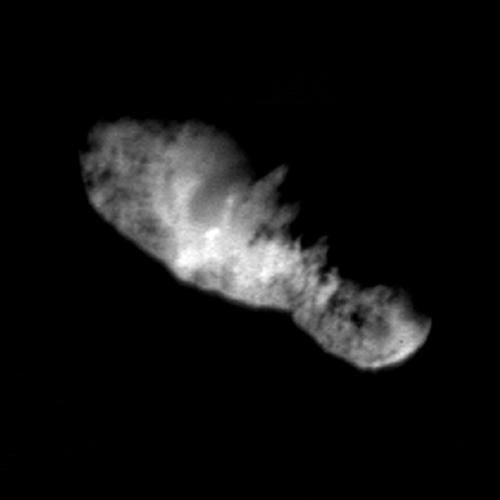
- The nucleus of Comet Borrelly as seen by NASA's Deep Space 1 mission in 22 September 2001.

Discovery
- Discovered by: Alphonse Borrelly
- Discovery site: Marseille, France
- Discovery date: 28 December 1904

Designations
- MPC designation: P/1904 Y2, P/1911 S1
- Pronunciation: /bɒˈrɛli/
- Alternative designations: 1905 II, 1911 VIII; 1918 IV, 1925 VIII; 1932 IV, 1953 IV, 1960 V; 1967 VIII, 1974 VII; 1981 IV, 1987 XXXIII; 1994 XXX

Orbital characteristics
- Epoch: 9 August 2022 (JD 2459800.5)
- Aphelion: 5.90 AU
- Perihelion: 1.306 AU
- Semi-major axis: 3.61 AU
- Eccentricity: 0.6377
- Orbital period: 6.85 years
- Inclination: 29.30°
- Last perihelion: 1 February 2022
- Next perihelion: 11 December 2028
- Earth MOID: 0.324 AU (48.5 million km)
- Jupiter MOID: 0.443 AU (66.3 million km)

Physical characteristics
- Dimensions: 8.0 × 4.0 × 4.0 km (5.0 × 2.5 × 2.5 mi)
- Mass: 2×10^{13} kg (Note: Using the volume of an ellipsoid of 8x4x4 km * a rubble pile density of 0.3 g/cm^{3} yields a mass (m=d*v) of 2.0×10^{13} kg)
- Mean density: 0.3 g/cm^{3}
- Geometric albedo: 0.072
- Comet total magnitude (M1): 9.8
- Comet nuclear magnitude (M2): 13.2

Perihelion distance at recent epochs
Epoch	Perihelion (AU)
2028	1.310
2022	1.306
2015	1.349
2008	1.355

Comet Borrelly /bɒˈrɛli/ or Borrelly's Comet (official designation: 19P/Borrelly) is a comet with a period of 6.85 years that was visited by the Deep Space 1 spacecraft in 2001. The comet last came to perihelion (closest approach to the Sun) on 1 February 2022 and will next come to perihelion on 11 December 2028.

19P/Borrelly closest Earth approach on 2028-Dec-05
Date & time of closest approach	Earth distance (AU)	Sun distance (AU)	Velocity wrt Earth (km/s)	Velocity wrt Sun (km/s)	Uncertainty region (3-sigma)	Reference
2028-Dec-05 19:12 ± 6 min	0.413 AU (61.8 million km; 38.4 million mi; 161 LD)	1.31 AU (196 million km; 122 million mi; 510 LD)	17.3	33.3	± 35 thousand km	Horizons

Deep Space 1 returned images of the comet's nucleus from 3400 kilometers away. At 45 meters per pixel, it was the highest resolution view ever seen of a comet up until that time.

== Discovery ==
The comet was discovered by Alphonse Borrelly during a routine search for comets at Marseille, France on 28 December 1904.

== Exploration ==
=== Deep Space 1 flyby ===
Animation of Deep Space 1's trajectory from 24 October 1998 to 31 December 2003 Deep Space 1 · 9969 Braille · Earth · 19P/Borrelly

On 21 September 2001 the spacecraft Deep Space 1, which was launched to test new equipment in space, performed a flyby of Borrelly. It was steered toward the comet during the extended mission of the craft, and presented an unexpected bonus for the mission scientists. Despite the failure of a system that helped determine its orientation, Deep Space 1 managed to send back to Earth what were, at the time, the best images and other science data from a comet.

The orbits of three periodic comets, 1P/Halley, 19P/Borrelly and 153P/Ikeya-Zhang, set against the orbits of the outer planets.

== Notes ==
Numbered comets
Previous; 18D/Perrine–Mrkos	19P/Borrelly	Next; 20D/Westphal
