= Eleanor F. Helin =

American astronomer (1932–2009)

- Eleanor Helin holds the announcement for discovery of 2100 Ra-Shalom, 1979
- Born: Eleanor Frances Helin; 19 November 1932
- Died: 25 January 2009 (aged 76)
- Education: Occidental College
- Known for: discoverer of minor planets
- Scientific career
- Fields: Astronomy; astrophysics
- Workplaces: Caltech · JPL
- Notable students: Celina Mikolajczak

Minor planets discovered: 903
see § List of discovered minor planets

Eleanor Francis "Glo" Helin (née Francis, 19 November 1932 – 25 January 2009) was an American astronomer. She was principal investigator of the Near-Earth Asteroid Tracking (NEAT) program of NASA's Jet Propulsion Laboratory. (Some sources give her name as Eleanor Kay Helin.)

Helin was a prolific discoverer of minor planets (see list) and several comets, including periodic comets 111P/Helin–Roman–Crockett, 117P/Helin–Roman–Alu and 132P/Helin–Roman–Alu. She is credited as the discoverer of the object now known as both asteroid 4015 Wilson–Harrington and comet 107P/Wilson–Harrington. Although Wilson and Harrington preceded her by some decades, their observations did not establish an orbit for the object, while her rediscovery did. Helin discovered or co-discovered 903 asteroids and several comets.

== Biography ==
Eleanor was born an only child to Fred and Kay Francis. At the age of five, she became ill with polio, which caused her to be bed-ridden for several months.

Eleanor studied geology at Occidental College, leaving just shy of her graduation in 1954. She married Ron Helin and started working at California Institute of Technology, where she and Bruce C. Murray started the Lunar Research Lab to prepare for lunar landing missions.

Eleanor Helin was active in planetary science and astronomy at the California Institute of Technology and the Jet Propulsion Laboratory for over three decades. Her studies of lunar craters raised interest about near Earth Objects, and in the early 1970s, she initiated the Palomar Planet-Crossing Asteroid Survey (PCAS) from Palomar Observatory. This program is responsible for the discovery of thousands of asteroids of all types including more than 200 in high inclination orbits, other asteroids in rare and unique types of orbits, 20 comets, and approximately 30 percent of the near-Earth asteroids discovered worldwide. Using the 18-inch Schmidt telescope, Helin discovered her first asteroid on July 3, 1973.

In 1980, Helin started working at JPL, where she organized and coordinated the International Near-Earth Asteroid Survey (INAS) during the 1980s, encouraging and stimulating worldwide interest in asteroids. In recognition of her accomplishments, she received NASA's Exceptional Service Medal.

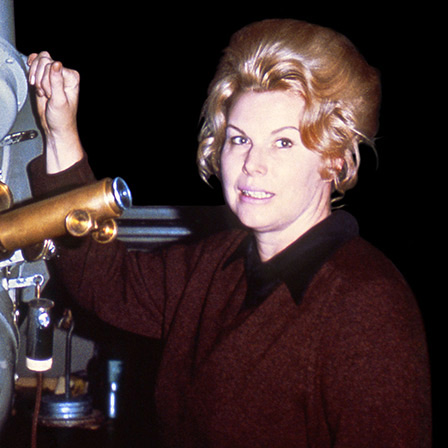
Eleanor Helin at work.

After conducting the PCAS photographic search program from Palomar for nearly 25 years, Helin concentrated on the new, upgraded Near Earth Asteroid Tracking (NEAT) search program using electronic sensors on a large aperture telescope. The operations were conducted in 1996 at Hakeakalā Observatory in Maui, Hawai'i, and at Palomar in 2001 with the Samuel Oschin Telescope. She was the principal investigator for this program operating from JPL, for which she received the 1997 JPL Award for Excellence. She also received NASA's Group Achievement Award for the NEAT Team.

In operation from 1995 to 2007, NEAT was the first autonomous observing program; no JPL personnel were on-site, only the JPL Sunspark computer which ran the observing system through the night and transmitted the data back to JPL each morning for team member review and confirmation. NEAT detected over 26,000 objects, including 31 near-Earth asteroids, two long period comets and the unique object, 1996 PW, the most eccentric asteroid known (e = 0.99012940), which moves in a long-period (4110.50 a), comet-like orbit (semi-major axis 256.601 AU).

Helin retired from NASA in 2002, and died in January 2009.

Caltech Optical Observatories hosted a Helin Commemorative Workshop on 28 September 2010 to honour the contributions of Eleanor and Ronald Helin. Palomar Observatory opened an exhibit dedicated to her and her work with the 18-inch Schmidt telescope in September 2013.

== Awards and honors ==
The Mars-crossing asteroid 3267 Glo, discovered by Edward Bowell in 1981, was named after her nickname. The official naming citation was published by the Minor Planet Center on 13 February 1987 (M.P.C. 11641).

In 1991, the USS Helin debuted on the movie Star Trek VI: The Undiscovered Country. The ship was named after her for "having discovered an unprecedented number of asteroids and comets".

In 1992, Helin received an honorary doctorate from her alma mater, Occidental College.

Helin was awarded the NASA Exceptional Service Medal. In 1998 she was inducted to the Women in Technology Hall of Fame.

== Discoveries by Helin ==
Helin is credited by the Minor Planet Center with the discovery or co-discovered of more than 900 numbered minor planets, including the first two Aten asteroids: 2062 Aten and 2100 Ra-Shalom, which gave rise to this new orbital group of near-Earth objects.

She also discovered:

- Apollo asteroids such as 2135 Aristaeus, 3360 Syrinx, 4034 Vishnu, 4197 Morpheus, 4660 Nereus, 4769 Castalia and 6489 Golevka, among others,
- Amor asteroids such as 3757 Anagolay, 3988 Huma, 4055 Magellan, 4957 Brucemurray, 5653 Camarillo, 7336 Saunders and 8013 Gordonmoore,
- three Jupiter trojans including 3240 Laocoon,
- Mars-crossers such as 9969 Braille,
- hundreds of main-belt asteroids such as 4897 Tomhamilton,

=== Comets ===
Comets discovered by Eleanor F. Helin include:

- 151P/Helin
- C/1977 H1 (Helin)

She also co-discovered the following comets with other astronomers:

- Comet Helin–Alu
  - C/1991 L4 (Helin–Alu)
  - C/1992 A1 (Helin–Alu)
- Comet Helin–Roman
  - C/1989 R1 (Helin–Roman)
- Comet Helin–Roman–Alu
  - 117P/Helin–Roman–Alu
  - 132P/Helin–Roman–Alu
  - C/1989 T1 (Helin–Roman–Alu)
- Comet Helin–Roman–Crockett
  - 111P/Helin–Roman–Crockett
- Comet Helin–Lawrence
  - 152P/Helin–Lawrence
  - C/1991 F2 (Helin–Lawrence)
  - C/1992 Q2 (Helin–Lawrence)

Additionally, she is also credited for rediscovering one previously lost comet / active asteroid:

- 107P/Wilson–Harrington

=== List of discovered minor planets ===
List of minor planets discovered by Eleanor Helin

Name	Discovery Date	Listing
1982 Cline	4 November 1975	list
2048 Dwornik	27 August 1973	list
2050 Francis	28 May 1974	list
2062 Aten	7 January 1976	list
2074 Shoemaker	17 October 1974	list
2083 Smither	29 November 1973	list
2099 Öpik	8 November 1977	list
2100 Ra-Shalom	10 September 1978	list
2128 Wetherill	26 September 1973	list
2135 Aristaeus	17 April 1977	list^{[A]}
2143 Jimarnold	26 September 1973	list
2220 Hicks	4 November 1975	list
2324 Janice	7 November 1978	list^{[A]}
2335 James	17 October 1974	list
2343 Siding Spring	25 June 1979	list^{[A]}
2392 Jonathan Murray	25 June 1979	list^{[A]}
2430 Bruce Helin	8 November 1977	list^{[B]}
2440 Educatio	7 November 1978	list^{[A]}
2441 Hibbs	25 June 1979	list^{[A]}
2499 Brunk	7 November 1978	list^{[A]}
2611 Boyce	7 November 1978	list^{[A]}
2618 Coonabarabran	25 June 1979	list^{[A]}
2619 Skalnaté Pleso	25 June 1979	list^{[A]}
2628 Kopal	25 June 1979	list^{[A]}
2645 Daphne Plane	30 August 1976	list
2682 Soromundi	25 June 1979	list^{[A]}
2704 Julian Loewe	25 June 1979	list^{[A]}
2725 David Bender	7 November 1978	list^{[A]}
2860 Pasacentennium	8 October 1978	list
2925 Beatty	7 November 1978	list^{[A]}
3043 San Diego	20 September 1982	list
3101 Goldberger	11 April 1978	list^{[C]}^{[D]}
3129 Bonestell	25 June 1979	list^{[A]}
3205 Boksenberg	25 June 1979	list^{[A]}
3240 Laocoon	7 November 1978	list^{[A]}
3360 Syrinx	4 November 1981	list^{[E]}
3449 Abell	7 November 1978	list^{[A]}
3484 Neugebauer	10 July 1978	list^{[B]}
3651 Friedman	7 November 1978	list^{[A]}
3680 Sasha	28 June 1987	list
3718 Dunbar	7 November 1978	list^{[A]}
3737 Beckman	8 August 1983	list
3752 Camillo	15 August 1985	list^{[F]}
3756 Ruscannon	25 June 1979	list^{[A]}
3757 Anagolay	14 December 1982	list
3767 DiMaggio	3 June 1986	list
3795 Nigel	8 April 1986	list
3800 Karayusuf	4 January 1984	list
3817 Lencarter	25 June 1979	list^{[A]}
3855 Pasasymphonia	4 July 1986	list
3875 Staehle	17 May 1988	list
3876 Quaide	19 May 1988	list
3926 Ramirez	7 November 1978	list^{[A]}
3988 Huma	4 June 1986	list
4012 Geballe	7 November 1978	list^{[A]}
4015 Wilson-Harrington	15 November 1979	list
4034 Vishnu	2 August 1986	list
4055 Magellan	24 February 1985	list
4069 Blakee	7 November 1978	list^{[A]}
4103 Chahine	4 March 1989	list
4104 Alu	5 March 1989	list
4105 Tsia	5 March 1989	list
4107 Rufino	7 April 1989	list
4116 Elachi	20 September 1982	list
4125 Lew Allen	28 June 1987	list
4159 Freeman	5 April 1989	list
4160 Sabrina-John	3 June 1989	list
4178 Mimeev	13 March 1988	list
4197 Morpheus	11 October 1982	list^{[B]}
4209 Briggs	4 October 1986	list
4222 Nancita	13 March 1988	list
4224 Susa	19 May 1988	list
4285 Hulkower	11 July 1988	list
4314 Dervan	25 June 1979	list^{[A]}
4364 Shkodrov	7 November 1978	list^{[A]}
4365 Ivanova	7 November 1978	list^{[A]}
4393 Dawe	7 November 1978	list^{[A]}
4490 Bambery	14 July 1988	list^{[G]}
4525 Johnbauer	15 May 1982	list^{[B]}^{[H]}
4575 Broman	26 June 1987	list
4580 Child	4 March 1989	list
4612 Greenstein	2 May 1989	list
4629 Walford	7 October 1986	list
4656 Huchra	7 November 1978	list^{[A]}
4660 Nereus	28 February 1982	list
4674 Pauling	2 May 1989	list
4759 Åretta	7 November 1978	list^{[A]}
4766 Malin	28 March 1987	list
4769 Castalia	9 August 1989	list
4770 Lane	9 August 1989	list
4790 Petrpravec	9 August 1988	list
4796 Lewis	3 June 1989	list
4838 Billmclaughlin	2 July 1989	list
4868 Knushevia	27 October 1989	list
4874 Burke	12 January 1991	list
4897 Tomhamilton	22 August 1987	list
4900 Maymelou	16 June 1988	list
4950 House	7 December 1988	list
4957 Brucemurray	15 December 1990	list
4968 Suzamur	1 August 1986	list
4969 Lawrence	4 October 1986	list
4970 Druyan	12 November 1988	list
4984 Patrickmiller	7 November 1978	list^{[A]}
5000 IAU	23 August 1987	list
5006 Teller	5 April 1989	list
5019 Erfjord	25 June 1979	list^{[A]}
5032 Conradhirsh	18 July 1990	list
5062 Glennmiller	6 February 1989	list
5065 Johnstone	24 March 1990	list
5067 Occidental	19 July 1990	list
5129 Groom	7 April 1989	list
(5131) 1990 BG	21 January 1990	list^{[G]}
5181 SURF	7 April 1989	list
5182 Bray	1 July 1989	list
5183 Robyn	22 July 1990	list
5188 Paine	15 October 1990	list
5208 Royer	6 February 1989	list
5255 Johnsophie	19 May 1988	list
5256 Farquhar	11 July 1988	list^{[J]}^{[K]}
5262 Brucegoldberg	14 December 1990	list
5271 Kaylamaya	25 June 1979	list^{[A]}
5276 Gulkis	1 April 1987	list
5278 Polly	12 March 1988	list
5305 Bernievolz	7 November 1978	list^{[A]}
5347 Orestelesca	24 February 1985	list
5349 Paulharris	7 September 1988	list
5391 Emmons	13 September 1985	list
5402 Kejosmith	27 October 1989	list
5416 Estremadoyro	7 November 1978	list^{[A]}
5431 Maxinehelin	19 June 1988	list
5434 Tomwhitney	6 March 1989	list
5438 Lorre	18 August 1990	list
5477 Holmes	27 October 1989	list
(5496) 1973 NA	4 July 1973	list
5515 Naderi	5 March 1989	list
5516 Jawilliamson	2 May 1989	list
5517 Johnerogers	4 June 1989	list
5521 Morpurgo	15 August 1991	list
5559 Beategordon	27 June 1990	list
5560 Amytis	27 June 1990	list
5585 Parks	28 June 1990	list
5593 Jonsujatha	9 May 1991	list
5617 Emelyanenko	5 March 1989	list
5619 Shair	26 April 1990	list
5620 Jasonwheeler	19 July 1990	list^{[G]}
5622 Percyjulian	14 October 1990	list
5624 Shirley	11 January 1991	list
5634 Victorborge	7 November 1978	list^{[A]}
5639 Ćuk	9 August 1989	list^{[L]}
5641 McCleese	27 February 1990	list
5647 Sarojininaidu	14 October 1990	list
5649 Donnashirley	18 November 1990	list
5653 Camarillo	21 November 1992	list^{[M]}
5678 DuBridge	1 October 1989	list
5688 Kleewyck	12 January 1991	list
5735 Loripaul	4 June 1989	list
5736 Sanford	6 June 1989	list
5738 Billpickering	27 October 1989	list
5748 Davebrin	19 February 1991	list
5749 Urduja	17 March 1991	list
5772 Johnlambert	15 June 1988	list
5773 Hopper	2 July 1989	list
5774 Ratliff	2 July 1989	list
5785 Fulton	17 March 1991	list
5796 Klemm	7 November 1978	list^{[A]}
5811 Keck	19 May 1988	list
5817 Robertfrazer	5 September 1989	list
5832 Martaprincipe	15 June 1991	list
(5836) 1993 MF	22 June 1993	list^{[M]}
5841 Stone	19 September 1982	list
5849 Bhanji	27 April 1990	list
5870 Baltimore	11 February 1989	list
5871 Bobbell	11 February 1989	list
5877 Toshimaihara	23 March 1990	list
5878 Charlene	14 February 1991	list
5888 Ruders	7 November 1978	list^{[A]}
5905 Johnson	11 February 1989	list
5916 van der Woude	8 May 1991	list
5917 Chibasai	7 July 1991	list
5959 Shaklan	2 July 1989	list
5968 Trauger	17 March 1991	list
6009 Yuzuruyoshii	24 March 1990	list
6010 Lyzenga	19 July 1990	list
6041 Juterkilian	21 May 1990	list
6058 Carlnielsen	7 November 1978	list^{[A]}
6065 Chesneau	27 July 1987	list^{[E]}
6092 Johnmason	27 June 1990	list
6127 Hetherington	25 April 1989	list
6128 Lasorda	3 June 1989	list
6153 Hershey	19 July 1990	list
6181 Bobweber	6 September 1986	list
6192 Javiergorosabel	21 May 1990	list
6238 Septimaclark	2 July 1989	list
6249 Jennifer	7 May 1991	list
6250 Saekohayashi	2 November 1991	list
6271 Farmer	9 July 1991	list
6296 Cleveland	12 July 1988	list
6310 Jankonke	21 May 1990	list
6318 Cronkite	18 November 1990	list
6327 Tijn	9 April 1991	list
6335 Nicolerappaport	5 July 1992	list^{[L]}
6361 Koppel	7 November 1978	list^{[A]}
6384 Kervin	3 January 1989	list
6391 Africano	21 January 1990	list
6400 Georgealexander	10 April 1991	list
6403 Steverin	8 July 1991	list
6435 Daveross	24 February 1984	list^{[E]}
6445 Bellmore	23 March 1990	list
6446 Lomberg	18 August 1990	list
6447 Terrycole	14 October 1990	list
6450 Masahikohayashi	9 April 1991	list
6456 Golombek	27 July 1992	list^{[M]}
6466 Drewesquivel	25 June 1979	list^{[A]}
6479 Leoconnolly	15 June 1988	list
6484 Barthibbs	23 March 1990	list
6486 Anitahill	17 March 1991	list
6487 Tonyspear	8 April 1991	list
6489 Golevka	10 May 1991	list
6493 Cathybennett	2 February 1992	list
6515 Giannigalli	16 June 1988	list
6517 Buzzi	21 January 1990	list
6518 Vernon	23 March 1990	list
6521 Pina	15 June 1991	list
6522 Aci	9 July 1991	list
6524 Baalke	9 January 1992	list
6552 Higginson	5 April 1989	list
6560 Pravdo	9 July 1991	list
6577 Torbenwolff	7 November 1978	list^{[A]}
6602 Gilclark	4 March 1989	list
6603 Marycragg	19 May 1990	list
6608 Davidecrespi	2 November 1991	list
(6611) 1993 VW	9 November 1993	list^{[L]}
6623 Trioconbrio	25 June 1979	list^{[A]}
6645 Arcetri	11 January 1991	list
6646 Churanta	14 February 1991	list
6671 Concari	5 July 1994	list
6695 Barrettduff	1 August 1986	list
6711 Holliman	30 April 1989	list
6713 Coggie	21 May 1990	list
6723 Chrisclark	14 February 1991	list
6756 Williamfeldman	7 November 1978	list^{[A]}
6773 Kellaway	15 June 1988	list
6775 Giorgini	5 April 1989	list
6781 Sheikumarkahn	19 July 1990	list
6789 Milkey	4 September 1991	list
6799 Citfiftythree	17 May 1993	list
6812 Robertnelson	7 November 1978	list^{[A]}
6813 Amandahendrix	7 November 1978	list^{[A]}
6814 Steffl	25 June 1979	list^{[A]}
6815 Mutchler	25 June 1979	list^{[A]}
6848 Casely-Hayford	7 November 1978	list^{[A]}
6849 Doloreshuerta	25 June 1979	list^{[A]}
6856 Bethemmons	5 March 1989	list
6857 Castelli	19 August 1990	list
6875 Golgi	4 July 1994	list
6892 Lana	7 November 1978	list^{[A]}
6894 Macreid	5 September 1986	list
6911 Nancygreen	10 April 1991	list
6943 Moretto	7 November 1978	list^{[A]}
6944 Elaineowens	25 June 1979	list^{[A]}
6953 Davepierce	1 August 1986	list
6962 Summerscience	22 July 1990	list
6982 Cesarchavez	16 October 1993	list
7026 Gabrielasilang	19 August 1993	list
7052 Octaviabutler	12 November 1988	list
7061 Pieri	15 August 1991	list
7087 Lewotsky	13 October 1991	list
7091 Maryfields	1 May 1992	list^{[M]}
7093 Jonleake	26 July 1992	list
(7111) 1985 QA_{1}	17 August 1985	list
7154 Zhangmaolin	25 June 1979	list^{[A]}
7163 Barenboim	24 February 1984	list^{[E]}
7182 Robinvaughan	8 September 1991	list
7187 Isobe	30 January 1992	list
7290 Johnrather	11 May 1991	list
7299 Indiawadkins	21 November 1992	list
7321 Minervahoyt	25 June 1979	list^{[A]}
(7335) 1989 JA	1 May 1989	list
7336 Saunders	6 September 1989	list
(7341) 1991 VK	1 November 1991	list^{[M]}
7371 El-Baz	7 November 1978	list^{[A]}
7546 Meriam	25 June 1979	list^{[A]}
7547 Martinnakata	25 June 1979	list^{[A]}
(7579) 1990 TN_{1}	14 October 1990	list
7593 Cernuschi	21 November 1992	list
7630 Yidumduma	25 June 1979	list^{[A]}
(7663) 1994 RX_{1}	2 September 1994	list
(7703) 1991 RW	7 September 1991	list
7732 Ralphpass	7 November 1978	list^{[A]}
7733 Segarpassi	25 June 1979	list^{[A]}
7734 Kaltenegger	25 June 1979	list^{[A]}
7757 Kameya	22 May 1990	list
7758 Poulanderson	21 May 1990	list
7780 Maren	15 July 1993	list^{[N]}
7781 Townsend	19 August 1993	list
7809 Marcialangton	25 June 1979	list^{[A]}
7818 Muirhead	19 August 1990	list
7824 Lynch	7 September 1991	list
7829 Jaroff	21 November 1992	list
7831 François-Xavier	21 March 1993	list
7915 Halbrook	25 June 1979	list^{[A]}
7932 Plimpton	7 April 1989	list
7939 Asphaug	14 January 1991	list
(7949) 1992 SU	23 September 1992	list
7981 Katieoakman	7 November 1978	list^{[A]}
7982 Timmartin	25 June 1979	list^{[A]}
8005 Albinadubois	16 June 1988	list
8013 Gordonmoore	18 May 1990	list
(8014) 1990 MF	26 June 1990	list
8024 Robertwhite	17 March 1991	list
8026 Johnmckay	8 May 1991	list
8082 Haynes	12 July 1988	list
8131 Scanlon	27 September 1976	list
8135 Davidmitchell	7 November 1978	list^{[A]}
8136 Landis	25 June 1979	list^{[A]}
8168 Rogerbourke	18 March 1991	list
(8195) 1993 UC_{1}	19 October 1993	list
(8196) 1993 UB_{3}	16 October 1993	list
8270 Winslow	2 May 1989	list
8271 Imai	2 July 1989	list
(8290) 1992 NP	2 July 1992	list^{[O]}
8355 Masuo	5 September 1989	list
8369 Miyata	8 April 1991	list
8378 Sweeney	23 September 1992	list
(8392) 1993 OP	18 July 1993	list
(8396) 1993 UR_{2}	19 October 1993	list
(8402) 1994 GH_{9}	11 April 1994	list
8613 Cindyschulz	7 November 1978	list^{[A]}
(8614) 1978 VP_{11}	7 November 1978	list^{[A]}
8615 Philipgrahamgood	25 June 1979	list^{[A]}
8663 Davidjohnston	18 February 1991	list
8664 Grigorijrichters	10 April 1991	list
8789 Effertz	7 November 1978	list^{[A]}
8790 Michaelamato	7 November 1978	list^{[A]}
8791 Donyabradshaw	7 November 1978	list^{[A]}
8792 Christyljohnson	7 November 1978	list^{[A]}
8810 Johnmcfarland	15 May 1982	list^{[B]}
(8825) 1988 MF	16 June 1988	list
(8843) 1990 OH	22 July 1990	list
8887 Scheeres	9 June 1994	list
8987 Cavancuddy	7 November 1978	list^{[A]}
8988 Hansenkoharcheck	25 June 1979	list^{[A]}
(9029) 1989 GM	6 April 1989	list
(9068) 1993 OD	16 July 1993	list
9069 Hovland	16 July 1993	list
(9075) 1994 GD_{9}	14 April 1994	list
9151 Kettnergriswold	25 June 1979	list^{[A]}
9177 Donsaari	18 December 1990	list
9180 Samsagan	8 April 1991	list
9186 Fumikotsukimoto	7 September 1991	list
9268 Jeremihschneider	7 November 1978	list^{[A]}
9269 Peterolufemi	7 November 1978	list^{[A]}
9270 Sherryjennings	7 November 1978	list^{[A]}
9271 Trimble	7 November 1978	list^{[A]}
(9400) 1994 TW_{1}	9 October 1994	list^{[M]}
9519 Jeffkeck	6 November 1978	list^{[A]}
9520 Montydibiasi	7 November 1978	list^{[A]}
(9616) 1993 FR_{3}	21 March 1993	list
9628 Sendaiotsuna	16 July 1993	list
9743 Tohru	8 April 1988	list
(9773) 1993 MG_{1}	23 June 1993	list
9830 Franciswasiak	7 November 1978	list^{[A]}
9918 Timtrenkle	25 June 1979	list^{[A]}
9945 Karinaxavier	21 May 1990	list
9947 Takaishuji	17 August 1990	list
9963 Sandage	9 January 1992	list
9969 Braille	27 May 1992	list^{[M]}
10018 Lykawka	25 June 1979	list^{[A]}
10019 Wesleyfraser	25 June 1979	list^{[A]}
10050 Rayman	28 June 1987	list
10051 Albee	23 August 1987	list
10076 Rogerhill	9 August 1989	list
10080 Macevans	18 July 1990	list
10109 Sidhu	29 May 1992	list
(10115) 1992 SK	24 September 1992	list^{[L]}
10267 Giuppone	7 November 1978	list^{[A]}
(10302) 1989 ML	29 June 1989	list^{[L]}
10315 Brewster	23 September 1990	list
10320 Reiland	14 October 1990	list
(10328) 1991 GC_{1}	10 April 1991	list
(10335) 1991 PG_{9}	15 August 1991	list
10460 Correa-Otto	7 November 1978	list^{[A]}
10463 Bannister	25 June 1979	list^{[A]}
10501 Ardmacha	19 July 1987	list
10502 Armaghobs	22 August 1987	list
(10531) 1991 GB_{1}	8 April 1991	list
(10556) 1993 QS	19 August 1993	list
(10562) 1993 UB_{1}	19 October 1993	list
10673 Berezhnoy	7 November 1978	list^{[A]}
10674 de Elía	7 November 1978	list^{[A]}
10676 Jamesmcdanell	25 June 1979	list^{[A]}
10677 Colucci	25 June 1979	list^{[A]}
10678 Alilagoa	25 June 1979	list^{[A]}
10679 Chankaochang	25 June 1979	list^{[A]}
10680 Ermakov	25 June 1979	list^{[A]}
(10743) 1988 VS_{2}	12 November 1988	list
(10750) 1989 PT	9 August 1989	list
(10779) 1991 LW	14 June 1991	list
(10995) 1978 NS	10 July 1978	list^{[B]}
10999 Braga-Ribas	7 November 1978	list^{[A]}
(11000) 1978 VE_{6}	6 November 1978	list^{[A]}
11002 Richardlis	24 June 1979	list^{[A]}
(11045) 1990 HH_{1}	26 April 1990	list
(11057) 1991 NL	8 July 1991	list
11059 Nulliusinverba	4 September 1991	list
(11096) 1994 RU_{1}	1 September 1994	list
11259 Yingtungchen	7 November 1978	list^{[A]}
11260 Camargo	7 November 1978	list^{[A]}
11262 Drube	25 June 1979	list^{[A]}
(11271) 1988 KB	19 May 1988	list
(11272) 1988 RK	8 September 1988	list
(11279) 1989 TC	1 October 1989	list^{[L]}
11448 Miahajduková	25 June 1979	list^{[A]}
(11497) 1989 CG_{1}	6 February 1989	list
11507 Danpascu	20 July 1990	list
11511 Billknopf	18 November 1990	list
(11512) 1991 AB_{2}	11 January 1991	list
(11523) 1991 PK_{1}	15 August 1991	list
11794 Yokokebukawa	7 November 1978	list^{[A]}
(11838) 1986 PJ_{1}	1 August 1986	list
12192 Gregbollendonk	7 November 1978	list^{[A]}
12195 Johndavidniemann	25 June 1979	list^{[A]}
12196 Weems	25 June 1979	list^{[A]}
(12265) 1990 FG	23 March 1990	list
(12266) 1990 FL	23 March 1990	list
(12269) 1990 QR	19 August 1990	list
12284 Pohl	17 March 1991	list
(12290) 1991 LZ	14 June 1991	list
(12322) 1992 QW	31 August 1992	list
(12377) 1994 PP	11 August 1994	list
12665 Chriscarson	6 November 1978	list^{[A]}
12668 Scottstarin	25 June 1979	list^{[A]}
12669 Emilybrisnehan	25 June 1979	list^{[A]}
(12700) 1990 FH	23 March 1990	list
(12756) 1993 QE_{1}	19 August 1993	list
(12763) 1993 UQ_{2}	19 October 1993	list
(12977) 1978 NC	10 July 1978	list^{[B]}
12980 Pruetz	6 November 1978	list^{[A]}
12981 Tracicase	7 November 1978	list^{[A]}
12982 Kaseybond	25 June 1979	list^{[A]}
13018 Geoffjames	10 April 1988	list
(13019) 1988 NW	10 July 1988	list
(13030) 1989 PF	9 August 1989	list^{[L]}
(13042) 1990 QE	18 August 1990	list
(13068) 1991 RL_{1}	4 September 1991	list
(13481) 1978 VM_{11}	6 November 1978	list^{[A]}
(13581) 1993 QX_{4}	19 August 1993	list
(13593) 1994 NF_{1}	4 July 1994	list
(13909) 1978 VD_{8}	7 November 1978	list^{[A]}
13910 Iranolt	25 June 1979	list^{[A]}
(13924) 1986 PE_{1}	1 August 1986	list
(13935) 1989 EE	4 March 1989	list
(13936) 1989 HC	30 April 1989	list
(13938) 1989 RP_{1}	5 September 1989	list
13943 Hankgreen	26 April 1990	list
(13958) 1991 DY	19 February 1991	list
13980 Neuhauser	2 July 1992	list
(14039) 1995 KZ_{1}	28 May 1995	list
(14321) 1978 VT_{9}	7 November 1978	list^{[A]}

Name	Discovery Date	Listing
(14323) 1979 MV_{1}	25 June 1979	list^{[A]}
(14324) 1979 MK_{6}	25 June 1979	list^{[A]}
(14325) 1979 MM_{6}	25 June 1979	list^{[A]}
(14362) 1988 MH	16 June 1988	list
(14370) 1988 VR_{2}	12 November 1988	list
(14373) 1989 LT	3 June 1989	list
14395 Tommorgan	15 October 1990	list
(14402) 1991 DB	18 February 1991	list
14799 Mitchschulte	25 June 1979	list^{[A]}
(14800) 1979 MP_{4}	25 June 1979	list^{[A]}
(14857) 1989 TT	1 October 1989	list
(14858) 1989 UW_{3}	27 October 1989	list
(14863) 1990 OK	18 July 1990	list
(14890) 1991 VG_{3}	4 November 1991	list
(15205) 1978 VC_{4}	7 November 1978	list^{[A]}
(15206) 1978 VJ_{6}	6 November 1978	list^{[A]}
(15208) 1979 MW_{1}	25 June 1979	list^{[A]}
(15209) 1979 ML_{2}	25 June 1979	list^{[A]}
(15210) 1979 MU_{2}	25 June 1979	list^{[A]}
(15211) 1979 MW_{3}	25 June 1979	list^{[A]}
(15317) 1993 HW_{1}	23 April 1993	list
(15327) 1993 RA_{3}	14 September 1993	list
(15704) 1987 SE_{7}	20 September 1987	list^{[L]}
(15717) 1990 BL_{1}	21 January 1990	list
(15721) 1990 OV	19 July 1990	list
(15778) 1993 NH	15 July 1993	list
(15784) 1993 QZ	20 August 1993	list
15822 Genefahnestock	8 October 1994	list
(16359) 1978 VO_{4}	7 November 1978	list^{[A]}
(16360) 1978 VY_{5}	7 November 1978	list^{[A]}
(16361) 1979 MS_{1}	25 June 1979	list^{[A]}
(16362) 1979 MJ_{4}	25 June 1979	list^{[A]}
(16363) 1979 MT_{4}	25 June 1979	list^{[A]}
(16364) 1979 MA_{5}	25 June 1979	list^{[A]}
(16365) 1979 MK_{5}	25 June 1979	list^{[A]}
(16366) 1979 ME_{7}	25 June 1979	list^{[A]}
(16397) 1982 JS_{2}	15 May 1982	list^{[B]}
(16446) 1989 MH	29 June 1989	list
(16469) 1990 KR	21 May 1990	list
(16527) 1991 DH_{1}	18 February 1991	list
16529 Dangoldin	9 April 1991	list
(16532) 1991 LY	14 June 1991	list
(16533) 1991 LA_{1}	14 June 1991	list
(16534) 1991 NB_{1}	10 July 1991	list
(16547) 1991 RS_{7}	7 September 1991	list
(16558) 1991 VQ_{2}	1 November 1991	list
(16562) 1992 AV_{1}	9 January 1992	list
16588 Johngee	23 September 1992	list
16589 Hastrup	24 September 1992	list
(16635) 1993 QO	20 August 1993	list
(16636) 1993 QP	23 August 1993	list^{[M]}
(16659) 1993 UH_{1}	19 October 1993	list
(16681) 1994 EV_{7}	11 March 1994	list
(17355) 1978 NK	10 July 1978	list^{[B]}
(17363) 1978 VF_{3}	7 November 1978	list^{[A]}
(17364) 1978 VR_{10}	7 November 1978	list^{[A]}
(17365) 1978 VF_{11}	7 November 1978	list^{[A]}
17447 Heindl	25 April 1990	list
(17478) 1991 LQ	13 June 1991	list
(17479) 1991 PV_{9}	13 August 1991	list
(17511) 1992 QN	29 August 1992	list^{[L]}
(17554) 1993 VY	9 November 1993	list
(17568) 1994 GT_{8}	11 April 1994	list
(17570) 1994 NQ	6 July 1994	list
(18296) 1978 VW_{2}	7 November 1978	list^{[A]}
(18297) 1978 VG_{4}	7 November 1978	list^{[A]}
(18298) 1979 MZ_{4}	25 June 1979	list^{[A]}
(18299) 1979 MT_{8}	25 June 1979	list^{[A]}
(18332) 1987 ON	19 July 1987	list
(18333) 1987 OV	19 July 1987	list
(18336) 1988 LG	15 June 1988	list
(18338) 1989 EP_{2}	4 March 1989	list
(18348) 1990 BM_{1}	22 January 1990	list
(18366) 1991 DG_{1}	18 February 1991	list
(18369) 1991 LM	13 June 1991	list
(18416) 1993 QW	22 August 1993	list
(18437) 1994 JR	5 May 1994	list
(18439) 1994 LJ_{1}	9 June 1994	list
(19086) 1978 VB_{3}	7 November 1978	list^{[A]}
(19087) 1978 VT_{4}	7 November 1978	list^{[A]}
(19088) 1978 VW_{4}	7 November 1978	list^{[A]}
(19089) 1978 VZ_{6}	7 November 1978	list^{[A]}
(19090) 1978 VM_{9}	7 November 1978	list^{[A]}
(19092) 1979 MF_{2}	25 June 1979	list^{[A]}
(19093) 1979 MM_{3}	25 June 1979	list^{[A]}
(19094) 1979 MR_{6}	25 June 1979	list^{[A]}
(19095) 1979 MA_{8}	25 June 1979	list^{[A]}
(19150) 1990 HY	26 April 1990	list
(19164) 1991 AU_{1}	12 January 1991	list
(19169) 1991 FD	17 March 1991	list
(19186) 1991 VY_{1}	5 November 1991	list
19234 Victoriahibbs	9 November 1993	list
(19245) 1994 EL_{2}	8 March 1994	list
(19920) 1978 NF	10 July 1978	list^{[B]}
(19921) 1978 VV_{3}	7 November 1978	list^{[A]}
(19922) 1978 VV_{4}	7 November 1978	list^{[A]}
(19923) 1978 VA_{8}	6 November 1978	list^{[A]}
(19924) 1979 MQ_{6}	25 June 1979	list^{[A]}
(19956) 1985 QW_{1}	17 August 1985	list
19982 Barbaradoore	22 January 1990	list
(20023) 1992 AR	9 January 1992	list
(20031) 1992 OO	27 July 1992	list
20062 Matthewgriffin	20 August 1993	list
(20966) 1978 VH_{5}	7 November 1978	list^{[A]}
(20967) 1978 VF_{6}	7 November 1978	list^{[A]}
(20968) 1978 VM_{8}	7 November 1978	list^{[A]}
(20996) 1986 PB	4 August 1986	list
(20997) 1986 PL_{1}	1 August 1986	list
(21008) 1988 PE	9 August 1988	list
(21028) 1989 TO	4 October 1989	list
(21040) 1990 OZ	20 July 1990	list
(21056) 1991 CA_{1}	14 February 1991	list
21065 Jamesmelka	10 July 1991	list
(21108) 1992 QT	31 August 1992	list
(21181) 1994 EB_{2}	6 March 1994	list
(21183) 1994 EO_{2}	9 March 1994	list
(22255) 1978 VX_{4}	7 November 1978	list^{[A]}
(22256) 1978 VP_{9}	7 November 1978	list^{[A]}
(22257) 1978 VJ_{10}	7 November 1978	list^{[A]}
(22258) 1979 MB_{3}	25 June 1979	list^{[A]}
(22259) 1979 MD_{5}	25 June 1979	list^{[A]}
(22290) 1989 AO	2 January 1989	list
(22300) 1990 OY	19 July 1990	list
(22301) 1990 OB_{1}	22 July 1990	list
(22318) 1991 PG_{1}	15 August 1991	list
(22321) 1991 RP	4 September 1991	list
(22345) 1992 SP_{2}	23 September 1992	list
(23413) 1978 VQ_{9}	7 November 1978	list^{[A]}
(23414) 1979 MP_{1}	25 June 1979	list^{[A]}
(23415) 1979 MQ_{3}	25 June 1979	list^{[A]}
(23416) 1979 MU_{4}	25 June 1979	list^{[A]}
(23417) 1979 MU_{6}	25 June 1979	list^{[A]}
(23439) 1986 PP	1 August 1986	list
(23458) 1989 RY_{1}	6 September 1989	list
(23467) 1990 QS_{3}	20 August 1990	list
(23482) 1991 LV	14 June 1991	list
(23496) 1991 VN_{3}	3 November 1991	list
(23519) 1992 SG_{13}	23 September 1992	list
(23550) 1994 GK_{9}	11 April 1994	list
(23551) 1994 GO_{9}	11 April 1994	list
(23552) 1994 NB	3 July 1994	list
(23561) 1994 RM_{12}	1 September 1994	list
(24613) 1978 VL_{3}	7 November 1978	list^{[A]}
(24614) 1978 VY_{3}	7 November 1978	list^{[A]}
(24615) 1978 VO_{5}	7 November 1978	list^{[A]}
(24616) 1978 VC_{9}	7 November 1978	list^{[A]}
(24620) 1979 MO_{2}	25 June 1979	list^{[A]}
(24621) 1979 MS_{4}	25 June 1979	list^{[A]}
(24622) 1979 MU_{5}	25 June 1979	list^{[A]}
(24623) 1979 MD_{8}	25 June 1979	list^{[A]}
(24644) 1985 DA	24 February 1985	list
(24675) 1989 TZ	2 October 1989	list
(24682) 1990 BH	22 January 1990	list
(24685) 1990 FQ	23 March 1990	list
(24687) 1990 HW	26 April 1990	list
(24743) 1992 NF	2 July 1992	list
(24745) 1992 QY	29 August 1992	list
(24780) 1993 QA_{1}	19 August 1993	list
(24809) 1994 TW_{3}	8 October 1994	list
(26076) 1979 MM_{1}	25 June 1979	list^{[A]}
(26077) 1979 ML_{6}	25 June 1979	list^{[A]}
(26078) 1979 MP_{6}	25 June 1979	list^{[A]}
(26079) 1979 MW_{6}	25 June 1979	list^{[A]}
(26088) 1985 QF_{1}	17 August 1985	list
(26089) 1985 QN_{2}	17 August 1985	list
(26094) 1988 NU	11 July 1988	list
(26150) 1994 RW_{11}	4 September 1994	list
(26796) 1978 VO_{6}	7 November 1978	list^{[A]}
(26797) 1978 VS_{8}	7 November 1978	list^{[A]}
(26819) 1987 QH_{7}	23 August 1987	list
26858 Misterrogers	21 March 1993	list
(26885) 1994 RN_{12}	3 September 1994	list
(27663) 1978 VP_{4}	7 November 1978	list^{[A]}
(27664) 1978 VX_{5}	6 November 1978	list^{[A]}
(27665) 1978 VZ_{5}	7 November 1978	list^{[A]}
(27666) 1978 VU_{6}	7 November 1978	list^{[A]}
(27668) 1979 ME_{4}	25 June 1979	list^{[A]}
(27669) 1979 MQ_{4}	25 June 1979	list^{[A]}
(27670) 1979 MY_{6}	25 June 1979	list^{[A]}
(27671) 1979 MG_{7}	25 June 1979	list^{[A]}
(27708) 1987 WP	20 November 1987	list^{[L]}
(27713) 1989 AA	2 January 1989	list
(27720) 1989 UP_{3}	26 October 1989	list
(27747) 1990 YW	18 December 1990	list
(27750) 1991 CW_{2}	14 February 1991	list
(27822) 1993 UG_{1}	19 October 1993	list
(29082) 1978 VG_{9}	7 November 1978	list^{[A]}
(29083) 1979 MG_{3}	25 June 1979	list^{[A]}
(29084) 1979 MD_{7}	25 June 1979	list^{[A]}
(29168) 1990 KJ	20 May 1990	list
(29169) 1990 OC_{1}	22 July 1990	list
29198 Weathers	18 February 1991	list
(29308) 1993 UF_{1}	20 October 1993	list
(30726) 1978 VK_{7}	7 November 1978	list^{[A]}
(30727) 1979 MC_{9}	25 June 1979	list^{[A]}
(30771) 1986 PO_{2}	1 August 1986	list
30775 Lattu	24 August 1987	list
(30776) 1987 QY	24 August 1987	list
(30799) 1989 LH	4 June 1989	list
(30810) 1990 FM	23 March 1990	list
(30813) 1990 QT	19 August 1990	list
(30814) 1990 QW	19 August 1990	list
30831 Seignovert	14 October 1990	list^{[M]}
(30843) 1991 JK_{1}	8 May 1991	list
(30854) 1991 VB	1 November 1991	list
(30856) 1991 XE	7 December 1991	list
(30858) 1992 AU_{1}	9 January 1992	list
(30947) 1994 JW	4 May 1994	list
(30958) 1994 TV_{3}	7 October 1994	list
(32739) 1978 VA_{5}	7 November 1978	list^{[A]}
(32740) 1978 VB_{7}	7 November 1978	list^{[A]}
(32741) 1978 VX_{8}	7 November 1978	list^{[A]}
(32742) 1978 VB_{10}	7 November 1978	list^{[A]}
(32743) 1979 MR_{1}	25 June 1979	list^{[A]}
(32744) 1979 MR_{5}	25 June 1979	list^{[A]}
(32797) 1990 OJ	18 July 1990	list
(32814) 1990 XZ	15 December 1990	list
(32898) 1994 PS_{1}	9 August 1994	list
(32906) 1994 RH	2 September 1994	list^{[M]}
(34999) 1978 VC_{3}	7 November 1978	list^{[A]}
(35000) 1978 VN_{3}	7 November 1978	list^{[A]}
(35001) 1978 VN_{4}	7 November 1978	list^{[A]}
(35002) 1978 VY_{8}	7 November 1978	list^{[A]}
(35003) 1979 MT_{1}	25 June 1979	list^{[A]}
(35004) 1979 MC_{3}	25 June 1979	list^{[A]}
(35005) 1979 MY_{3}	25 June 1979	list^{[A]}
(35055) 1984 RB	2 September 1984	list
(35067) 1989 LL	4 June 1989	list
(35100) 1991 NK	8 July 1991	list
(35102) 1991 RT	4 September 1991	list
(35133) 1992 QX	29 August 1992	list
(35135) 1992 RO_{1}	1 September 1992	list
(35161) 1993 OW	16 July 1993	list
(35194) 1994 ET_{3}	10 March 1994	list
(37531) 1978 VF_{7}	7 November 1978	list^{[A]}
(37532) 1978 VL_{8}	6 November 1978	list^{[A]}
(37533) 1979 MX_{8}	25 June 1979	list^{[A]}
(37562) 1988 MA	16 June 1988	list
(37568) 1989 TP	4 October 1989	list
(37587) 1991 CK_{3}	14 February 1991	list
(37589) 1991 NN_{9}	9 July 1991	list^{[M]}
(37634) 1993 UZ	19 October 1993	list
(37635) 1993 UJ_{1}	20 October 1993	list
(39472) 1978 VJ_{3}	7 November 1978	list^{[A]}
(39473) 1978 VW_{3}	6 November 1978	list^{[A]}
(39474) 1978 VC_{7}	7 November 1978	list^{[A]}
(39475) 1978 VE_{8}	7 November 1978	list^{[A]}
(39476) 1979 MA_{2}	25 June 1979	list^{[A]}
(39477) 1979 MF_{5}	25 June 1979	list^{[A]}
(39520) 1988 NY	12 July 1988	list
(39565) 1992 SL	24 September 1992	list^{[M]}
(39567) 1992 ST_{2}	22 September 1992	list
(39619) 1994 LC_{3}	10 June 1994	list
(42465) 1978 VH_{4}	7 November 1978	list^{[A]}
(42466) 1978 VP_{6}	6 November 1978	list^{[A]}
(42467) 1978 VX_{6}	7 November 1978	list^{[A]}
(42517) 1993 XU_{1}	14 December 1993	list
(43727) 1979 MQ_{2}	25 June 1979	list^{[A]}
(43728) 1979 MA_{3}	25 June 1979	list^{[A]}
(43729) 1979 MS_{3}	25 June 1979	list^{[A]}
(43730) 1979 MK_{4}	25 June 1979	list^{[A]}
(43731) 1979 ML_{5}	25 June 1979	list^{[A]}
(43732) 1979 MO_{7}	25 June 1979	list^{[A]}
(43733) 1979 MV_{7}	25 June 1979	list^{[A]}
(43734) 1979 MY_{7}	25 June 1979	list^{[A]}
(43758) 1985 QY_{2}	17 August 1985	list
(43796) 1991 AS_{1}	14 January 1991	list
(43815) 1991 VD_{4}	3 November 1991	list
(46515) 1978 VW_{5}	7 November 1978	list^{[A]}
(46516) 1978 VQ_{6}	6 November 1978	list^{[A]}
(46517) 1978 VM_{7}	7 November 1978	list^{[A]}
(46518) 1978 VH_{10}	6 November 1978	list^{[A]}
(46519) 1979 ME_{3}	25 June 1979	list^{[A]}
(46520) 1979 MJ_{3}	25 June 1979	list^{[A]}
(46521) 1979 MM_{7}	25 June 1979	list^{[A]}
(46522) 1979 MS_{7}	25 June 1979	list^{[A]}
(46540) 1983 LD	13 June 1983	list^{[E]}
(46559) 1991 PC_{1}	15 August 1991	list
(46561) 1991 RQ	7 September 1991	list
(46562) 1991 RV	7 September 1991	list
(46598) 1993 FT_{2}	19 March 1993	list
(48383) 1978 VH_{7}	6 November 1978	list^{[A]}
(48384) 1978 VQ_{8}	7 November 1978	list^{[A]}
(48385) 1978 VH_{9}	7 November 1978	list^{[A]}
(48386) 1979 MQ_{1}	25 June 1979	list^{[A]}
(48387) 1979 MM_{2}	25 June 1979	list^{[A]}
(48388) 1979 MZ_{5}	25 June 1979	list^{[A]}
(48389) 1979 MV_{8}	25 June 1979	list^{[A]}
(48414) 1987 OS	19 July 1987	list
(48450) 1991 NA	7 July 1991	list
(48453) 1991 PT_{9}	13 August 1991	list
48461 Sabrinamaricia	7 September 1991	list^{[P]}
(48477) 1991 VV	2 November 1991	list
(48478) 1991 VF_{3}	3 November 1991	list
(48533) 1993 QU	19 August 1993	list
(48570) 1994 EA_{2}	9 March 1994	list
(52229) 1978 NN	10 July 1978	list^{[B]}
(52230) 1978 NR	10 July 1978	list^{[B]}
(52235) 1979 MW_{2}	25 June 1979	list^{[A]}
(52236) 1979 MF_{7}	25 June 1979	list^{[A]}
(52264) 1985 RD_{2}	13 September 1985	list
(52280) 1989 RB	5 September 1989	list
(52284) 1990 HP	26 April 1990	list
(52314) 1991 XD	7 December 1991	list
(52315) 1992 AM	9 January 1992	list
(52317) 1992 BC_{1}	30 January 1992	list
(52385) 1993 OC	16 July 1993	list
(52423) 1994 LZ	11 June 1994	list
(52441) 1994 RS_{1}	1 September 1994	list
(52447) 1994 TH_{16}	8 October 1994	list
(55722) 1978 VU_{3}	7 November 1978	list^{[A]}
(55723) 1979 MP_{2}	25 June 1979	list^{[A]}
(55724) 1979 MB_{5}	25 June 1979	list^{[A]}
(55725) 1979 MG_{5}	25 June 1979	list^{[A]}
(55726) 1979 MG_{8}	25 June 1979	list^{[A]}
(55739) 1989 TV	4 October 1989	list
(55757) 1991 XN	7 December 1991	list
(55760) 1992 BL_{1}	30 January 1992	list
(58100) 1978 VQ_{7}	7 November 1978	list^{[A]}
(58101) 1979 MV_{4}	25 June 1979	list^{[A]}
(58102) 1979 MW_{4}	25 June 1979	list^{[A]}
(58103) 1979 MQ_{5}	25 June 1979	list^{[A]}
(58104) 1979 ML_{7}	25 June 1979	list^{[A]}
(58105) 1979 MN_{8}	25 June 1979	list^{[A]}
(58106) 1979 MO_{8}	25 June 1979	list^{[A]}
(58146) 1986 RU	6 September 1986	list
(58156) 1989 GL	6 April 1989	list
(58183) 1991 PH_{9}	15 August 1991	list
(58192) 1992 AQ	10 January 1992	list
(58213) 1992 QP	29 August 1992	list
(65636) 1979 ME_{1}	24 June 1979	list^{[A]}
(69235) 1978 VS_{3}	7 November 1978	list^{[A]}
(69236) 1978 VF_{5}	6 November 1978	list^{[A]}
(69237) 1978 VR_{6}	7 November 1978	list^{[A]}
(69238) 1978 VZ_{8}	7 November 1978	list^{[A]}
(69240) 1979 MZ_{1}	25 June 1979	list^{[A]}
(69241) 1979 MX_{3}	25 June 1979	list^{[A]}
(69242) 1979 MA_{7}	25 June 1979	list^{[A]}
(69243) 1979 MU_{7}	25 June 1979	list^{[A]}
(69244) 1979 MP_{8}	25 June 1979	list^{[A]}
(69294) 1991 PU_{9}	13 August 1991	list
(69349) 1993 VU	9 November 1993	list
(73645) 1978 VX_{2}	7 November 1978	list^{[A]}
(73646) 1978 VT_{3}	7 November 1978	list^{[A]}
(73647) 1978 VL_{9}	7 November 1978	list^{[A]}
(73648) 1979 ME_{6}	25 June 1979	list^{[A]}
(73649) 1979 MA_{9}	25 June 1979	list^{[A]}
(73673) 1986 RX_{1}	6 September 1986	list
(73681) 1989 TL_{18}	2 October 1989	list^{[M]}
(79088) 1978 VB_{4}	7 November 1978	list^{[A]}
(79089) 1978 VX_{10}	7 November 1978	list^{[A]}
(79090) 1979 MZ_{8}	25 June 1979	list^{[A]}
(79142) 1991 VR_{2}	1 November 1991	list
(79186) 1993 QN	20 August 1993	list^{[L]}
(79244) 1994 RT_{1}	1 September 1994	list
(85123) 1978 VC_{8}	7 November 1978	list^{[A]}
(85124) 1978 VF_{8}	7 November 1978	list^{[A]}
(85125) 1978 VU_{8}	7 November 1978	list^{[A]}
(85126) 1978 VO_{10}	7 November 1978	list^{[A]}
(85127) 1978 VJ_{11}	7 November 1978	list^{[A]}
(85129) 1979 MC_{5}	25 June 1979	list^{[A]}
(85130) 1979 MH_{5}	25 June 1979	list^{[A]}
(85131) 1979 MT_{6}	25 June 1979	list^{[A]}
(85132) 1979 MR_{7}	25 June 1979	list^{[A]}
(85133) 1979 MX_{7}	25 June 1979	list^{[A]}
(85134) 1979 MH_{8}	25 June 1979	list^{[A]}
(85152) 1985 QL_{3}	16 August 1985	list
(85182) 1991 AQ	14 January 1991	list
(85184) 1991 JG_{1}	9 May 1991	list
(85189) 1991 RL_{2}	4 September 1991	list
(85245) 1993 RM_{2}	14 September 1993	list
(85275) 1994 LY	11 June 1994	list
(85300) 1994 UW_{2}	30 October 1994	list
(90676) 1978 VA_{9}	7 November 1978	list^{[A]}
(90677) 1978 VN_{10}	7 November 1978	list^{[A]}
(90678) 1979 MC_{6}	25 June 1979	list^{[A]}
(90679) 1979 MF_{6}	25 June 1979	list^{[A]}
(90772) 1993 UH	19 October 1993	list
(96159) 1978 VR_{3}	7 November 1978	list^{[A]}
(96160) 1978 VW_{7}	7 November 1978	list^{[A]}
(96161) 1978 VS_{9}	7 November 1978	list^{[A]}
(96162) 1979 MN_{7}	25 June 1979	list^{[A]}
(96177) 1984 BC	30 January 1984	list^{[E]}
(96182) 1989 RT_{1}	6 September 1989	list
(96183) 1989 UG_{2}	27 October 1989	list
(96188) 1991 GC	8 April 1991	list
(96234) 1993 UG	20 October 1993	list
(99954) 1978 NH	10 July 1978	list^{[B]}
(99956) 1978 VA	5 November 1978	list
(99957) 1978 VM_{4}	7 November 1978	list^{[A]}
(99958) 1978 VB_{9}	6 November 1978	list^{[A]}
(99959) 1978 VW_{9}	7 November 1978	list^{[A]}
(99960) 1978 VD_{10}	6 November 1978	list^{[A]}
(99961) 1979 MT_{2}	25 June 1979	list^{[A]}
(99962) 1979 MF_{3}	25 June 1979	list^{[A]}
(99963) 1979 MO_{5}	25 June 1979	list^{[A]}
(99964) 1979 MJ_{6}	25 June 1979	list^{[A]}
(99965) 1979 MC_{7}	25 June 1979	list^{[A]}
(99966) 1979 MC_{8}	25 June 1979	list^{[A]}
(100005) 1986 RY	6 September 1986	list
(100037) 1991 RM	4 September 1991	list
(100119) 1993 OB	16 July 1993	list
(100130) 1993 RD_{3}	12 September 1993	list
(118163) 1979 MJ_{8}	25 June 1979	list^{[A]}
(120439) 1978 VJ_{4}	7 November 1978	list^{[A]}
(120440) 1978 VU_{9}	7 November 1978	list^{[A]}
(120441) 1979 MZ_{7}	25 June 1979	list^{[A]}
(120450) 1982 SV	20 September 1982	list
(120456) 1989 JB	3 May 1989	list
(120478) 1992 QS	29 August 1992	list
(129437) 1978 NG	10 July 1978	list^{[B]}
(129438) 1979 MO_{3}	25 June 1979	list^{[A]}
(134341) 1979 MA	25 June 1979	list^{[A]}
(134342) 1979 MV_{3}	25 June 1979	list^{[A]}
(136564) 1977 VA	7 November 1977	list^{[B]}
(136566) 1978 VE_{4}	7 November 1978	list^{[A]}
(136604) 1993 QD_{1}	19 August 1993	list
(136620) 1994 JC	4 May 1994	list^{[M]}
(150107) 1978 VL_{4}	7 November 1978	list^{[A]}
(152563) 1992 BF	30 January 1992	list^{[M]}
(159368) 1979 QB	22 August 1979	list
(161995) 1983 LB	13 June 1983	list^{[Q]}
(161999) 1989 RC	5 September 1989	list^{[L]}
(162000) 1990 OS	21 July 1990	list
(162004) 1991 VE	3 November 1991	list^{[M]}
(181704) 1989 NA	2 July 1989	list
(190282) 1989 UQ_{3}	26 October 1989	list
(192282) 1979 MY_{4}	25 June 1979	list^{[A]}
(207943) 1979 MN_{4}	25 June 1979	list^{[A]}
(207945) 1991 JW	8 May 1991	list^{[M]}
(264259) 1979 MC_{4}	25 June 1979	list^{[A]}
(283319) 1992 WR_{4}	19 November 1992	list
(301844) 1990 UA	16 October 1990	list
(301846) 1993 OV_{1}	16 July 1993	list^{[M]}
(306381) 1993 RR_{2}	14 September 1993	list
(310379) 1994 NZ	4 July 1994	list
(312936) 1979 MT_{3}	25 June 1979	list^{[A]}
(316651) 1990 OL	22 July 1990	list
(331471) 1984 QY_{1}	27 August 1984	list^{[R]}
(350442) 1979 ME_{2}	23 June 1979	list^{[A]}
(356971) 1991 TK_{2}	10 October 1991	list
(385186) 1994 AW_{1}	11 January 1994	list^{[M]}
(393350) 1992 RN_{1}	1 September 1992	list^{[M]}
(399307) 1991 RJ_{2}	8 September 1991	list
(523828) 1992 BC	24 January 1992	list^{[M]}
(612012) 1983 LC	13 June 1983	list^{[E]}
(826865) 1979 MW_{5}	25 June 1979	list^{[A]}
(826873) 1993 ME_{1}	23 June 1993	list^{[M]}
Co-discovery made with:^{A} S. J. Bus^{B} E. M. Shoemaker^{C} G. Grueff^{D} J. V. Wall^{E} R. S. Dunbar^{F} M. A. Barucci^{G} B. Roman^{H} P. D. Wilder^{J} C. Mikolajczak^{K} R. Coker^{L} J. Alu^{M} K. J. Lawrence^{N} J. B. Child^{O} L. Lee^{P} S. Cohen^{Q} S. R. Swanson^{R} P. Rose

== See also ==
- List of minor planet discoverers § E. F. Helin
