= 2430 Bruce Helin =

Main-belt asteroid

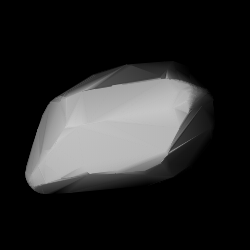
- Bruce Helin modeled from its lightcurve

Discovery
- Discovered by: E. F. Helin; E. Shoemaker
- Discovery site: Palomar Obs.
- Discovery date: 8 November 1977

Designations
- Named after: Bruce Helin (son of Eleanor Helin)
- Alternative designations: 1977 VC · 1976 JU_{1} A908 WC
- Minor planet category: main-belt · Phocaea

Orbital characteristics
- Epoch 4 September 2017 (JD 2458000.5)
- Uncertainty parameter 0
- Observation arc: 40.44 yr (14,772 days)
- Aphelion: 2.8697 AU
- Perihelion: 1.8555 AU
- Semi-major axis: 2.3626 AU
- Eccentricity: 0.2146
- Orbital period (sidereal): 3.63 yr (1,326 days)
- Mean anomaly: 21.845°
- Mean motion: 0° 16^{m} 17.04^{s} / day
- Inclination: 23.459°
- Longitude of ascending node: 45.854°
- Argument of perihelion: 309.89°

Physical characteristics
- Mean diameter: 11.83±0.17 km; 12.47±0.32 km
- Synodic rotation period: 128 h (Note: Pravec (2006) web: rotation period 128 hours with a brightness amplitude of 0.6 mag. Summary figures at Collaborative Asteroid Lightcurve Link (CALL) for (2430) Bruce Helin); 129.4163±0.3970 h 129.75 h
- Geometric albedo: 0.175±0.006; 0.238±0.032
- Spectral type: S (Tholen); Sl (SMASS); B–V = 0.815; U–B = 0.415
- Absolute magnitude (H): 11.693±0.003 (R) · 11.70 · 11.8 · 12.24

2430 Bruce Helin (prov. designation: 1977 VC) is a stony Phocaea asteroid and slow rotator from the inner regions of the asteroid belt. It was discovered by American astronomers Eleanor Helin and Eugene Shoemaker at the U.S. Palomar Observatory in California, on 8 November 1977. It was later named after Bruce Helin, son of the first discoverer. The S-type asteroid (Sl) has an exceptionally long rotation period of 128 hours and measures approximately 12 kilometers (7.5 miles) in diameter.

== Orbit and classification ==
Bruce Helin is a member of the Phocaea family (701). It orbits the Sun in the inner main-belt at a distance of 1.9–2.9 AU once every 3 years and 8 months (1,326 days). Its orbit has an eccentricity of 0.21 and an inclination of 23° with respect to the ecliptic. It was first observed at A908 WC at Heidelberg Observatory in 1908. The body's observation arc begins with a precovery taken at Crimea–Nauchnij in 1976, or one year prior to its official discovery observation at Palomar.

== Naming ==
This minor planet was named after Bruce Helin, son of the first discover Eleanor Helin, in an expression of gratitude for "the many years he tolerated his mother's preoccupation with extraterrestrial objects". The discoverer has also honoured her daughter-in-law and wife of Bruce, Nancy Coker Helin, by the minor planet 4222 Nancita. The official naming citation was published by the Minor Planet Center on 13 October 1981 (M.P.C. 6421).

== Physical characteristics ==
In the Tholen classification, Bruce Helin is a common, stony S-type asteroid, while in the Bus–Binzel SMASS taxonomy, it is an Sl-subtype, which transitions from the S-type to the uncommon L-type asteroid.

=== Rotation period ===
The first rotational lightcurve of Bruce Helin was obtained from photometric observations by Czech astronomer Petr Pravec in September 2006. The lightcurve showed a rotation period of 128 hours with a brightness variation of 0.60 in magnitude (U=2). Later observations rendered a similar rotation period of 129.75 and 129.4163±0.3970 hours, respectively (U=n.a./2).

=== Diameter and albedo ===
According to the surveys carried out by the Japanese Akari satellite and NASA's Wide-field Infrared Survey Explorer with its NEOWISE mission, Bruce Helin measures 11.8 and 12.5 kilometers in diameter, and its surface has an albedo of 0.18 and 0.24, respectively. The Collaborative Asteroid Lightcurve Link (CALL) assumes an albedo of 0.23 and calculates a diameter of 12.1 kilometers with an absolute magnitude of 11.8.
