= Hovland =

Hovland may refer to:

== Places ==
- Hovland, Minnesota, U.S.
- Hoffland or Hovland, a village in Ålesund, Norway

== People with the surname ==
- Carl Hovland (1912–1961), American psychologist
- Egil Hovland (1924–2013), Norwegian composer
- Even Hovland (born 1989), Norwegian footballer
- Frank Hovland (born 1960), Norwegian rock musician and music producer
- George Hovland (1926–2021), American skier
- Ingeborg Hovland (born 1969), Norwegian footballer
- Julie Hovland, wife of Telly Savalas
- Viktor Hovland (born 1997), Norwegian golfer

== Other uses ==
- 9069 Hovland, an asteroid
