= 3800 Karayusuf =

Mars-crossing asteroid

Discovery
- Discovered by: E. F. Helin
- Discovery site: Palomar Obs.
- Discovery date: 4 January 1984

Designations
- Named after: Alford Karayusuf (discoverer's friend)
- Alternative designations: 1984 AB · 1975 XL_{4}
- Minor planet category: Mars-crosser

Orbital characteristics
- Epoch 23 March 2018 (JD 2458200.5)
- Uncertainty parameter 0
- Observation arc: 42.47 yr (15,513 d)
- Aphelion: 1.6974 AU
- Perihelion: 1.4584 AU
- Semi-major axis: 1.5779 AU
- Eccentricity: 0.0757
- Orbital period (sidereal): 1.98 yr (724 d)
- Mean anomaly: 349.96°
- Mean motion: 0° 29^{m} 50.28^{s} / day
- Inclination: 14.847°
- Longitude of ascending node: 95.451°
- Argument of perihelion: 115.76°

Physical characteristics
- Mean diameter: 2.51±0.25 km
- Synodic rotation period: 2.2319±0.0001 h (Note: Lightcurve plots of (3800) Karayusuf from 2008 and 2010, by B. D. Warner at the Palmer Divide Observatory.)
- Geometric albedo: 0.281
- Spectral type: SMASS = S · S L (SDSS-MOC)
- Absolute magnitude (H): 14.81±0.94; 15.00; 15.40

3800 Karayusuf, provisional designation 1984 AB, is a Mars-crossing asteroid and suspected binary system from inside the asteroid belt, approximately 2.5 kilometers (1.6 miles) in diameter. It was discovered on 4 January 1984, by American astronomer Eleanor Helin at the Palomar Observatory in California. The S/L-type asteroid has a short rotation period of 2.2 hours. It was named after Syrian physician Alford Karayusuf, a friend of the discoverer.

== Orbit and classification ==
Karayusuf is a Mars-crossing asteroid, a dynamically unstable group between the main-belt and the near-Earth populations, crossing the orbit of Mars at 1.66 AU. It orbits the Sun at a distance of 1.46–1.70 AU once every 2 years (724 days; semi-major axis of 1.58 AU). Its orbit has an eccentricity of 0.08 and an inclination of 15° with respect to the ecliptic. On 11 June 1938, Karayusuf passed 0.0151 AU (2,260,000 km; 1,400,000 mi) from Mars.

The body's observation arc begins with its first observations as 1975 XL_{4} at Crimea–Nauchnij in December 1975, almost 12 years prior to its official discovery observation at Palomar.

== Naming ==
This minor planet was named after Syrian physician Alford Karayusuf, a supporter of the Near-earth asteroid research projects at JPL and a leader of the World Space Foundation's program of Solar System exploration. The official naming citation was published by the Minor Planet Center on 2 November 1990 (M.P.C. 17221). The main-belt asteroid 5255 Johnsophie, also discovered by Helin, was named after Alford Karayusuf's children, John and Sophie (also see the asteroid's citation).

== Physical characteristics ==
In the SMASS classification, Karayusuf is a common, stony S-type asteroid. The asteroid has also been characterized as an L-type asteroid by the Sloan Digital Sky Survey and Pan-STARRS' photometric survey.

=== Rotation period ===
In March 2008, a rotational lightcurve of Karayusuf was obtained from photometric observations by Brian Warner at his Palmer Divide Observatory in Colorado. Lightcurve analysis gave a well-defined rotation period of 2.2319±0.0001 hours with a rather small brightness amplitude of 0.15 magnitude (U=3). The body's rotation is close to the threshold-period of that of a fast rotator, which would fly apart if they were not composed of a solid, monolithic structure.

Follow-up observations by Warner in 2010, 2014 and 2018 gave similar results. (Note: Warner (2018) web: rotation period 2.2328±0.0004 hours with a brightness amplitude of 0.18±0.01 mag. Quality code is 3. Summary figures for (3800) Karayusuf at the LCDB.) The asteroid was also observed by Brian Skiff (2.225 h) and William Ryan (2.23 h) in 2018. (Note: Photometric observation of (3800) Karayusuf by Brian Skiff and Bill Ryan. Quality code of 3-/2. Summary figures at the LCDB.)

=== Binary candidate ===
During Brian Warner's photometric observations, two possible mutual eclipsing/occultation events were observed, indicating that Karayusuf is a binary asteroid with a satellite in its orbit. The data, however, was insufficient to calculate a rotation period. In 2010 and in 2014, when observing conditions had a nearly identical phase angle, no evidence of an orbiting minor-planet moon was found. The results of the 2018-observation have not yet been published.

=== Diameter and albedo ===
According to the survey carried out by the NEOWISE mission of NASA's Wide-field Infrared Survey Explorer, Karayusuf measures 2.51 kilometers in diameter and its surface has an albedo between 0.281, while other NEOWISE observations gave a diameter of 1.624 kilometers with a not very plausible albedo of 0.657. The Collaborative Asteroid Lightcurve Link assumes a standard albedo for a stony asteroid of 0.20 and calculates a diameter of 2.97 kilometers based on an absolute magnitude of 15.0.
