= 3267 Glo =

Asteroid

Discovery
- Discovered by: E. Bowell
- Discovery site: Anderson Mesa Stn.
- Discovery date: 3 January 1981

Designations
- Named after: Eleanor F. Helin (American astronomer)
- Alternative designations: 1981 AA
- Minor planet category: Mars-crosser; Phocaea

Orbital characteristics
- Epoch 23 March 2018 (JD 2458200.5)
- Uncertainty parameter 0
- Observation arc: 36.49 yr (13,329 d)
- Aphelion: 3.0178 AU
- Perihelion: 1.6424 AU
- Semi-major axis: 2.3301 AU
- Eccentricity: 0.2951
- Orbital period (sidereal): 3.56 yr (1,299 d)
- Mean anomaly: 196.67°
- Mean motion: 0° 16^{m} 37.56^{s} / day
- Inclination: 24.021°
- Longitude of ascending node: 110.47°
- Argument of perihelion: 307.73°

Physical characteristics
- Mean diameter: 6.45±1.44 km 7.58±0.76 km 13.56±1.1 km 13.59 km (derived)
- Synodic rotation period: 6.8782±0.0011 h (Note: Lightcurve plot of 3267 Glo giving a rotation period of 6.8782 hours with an amplitude of 0.0329 magnitude, taken from unpublished data of the Ondrejov Asteroid Photometry Project. Summary figures at the LCDB.)
- Geometric albedo: 0.0607±0.011; 0.0725 (derived); 0.233±0.047; 0.26±0.12
- Spectral type: LS · S (derived)
- Absolute magnitude (H): 12.8 · 12.86±0.14; 13.19

3267 Glo, provisional designation 1981 AA, is an eccentric Phocaean asteroid and sizable Mars-crosser from the inner regions of the asteroid belt, approximately 6.4 kilometers (4.0 miles) in diameter. It was discovered on 3 January 1981, by American astronomer Edward Bowell at Lowell's Anderson Mesa Station in Flagstaff, Arizona. It was later named after American astronomer Eleanor Helin.

== Orbit and classification ==
Glo is an eccentric member of the Phocaea family (701), that orbits the Sun in the inner asteroid belt at a distance of 1.6–3.0 AU once every 3 years and 7 months (1,299 days; semi-major axis of 2.33 AU). Its orbit has an eccentricity of 0.30 and an inclination of 24° with respect to the ecliptic.

The body's observation arc begins with its official discovery observation at Anderson Mesa in January 1981.

== Physical characteristics ==
The asteroid has been characterized as an L- and S-type asteroid by Pan-STARRS large-scale survey.

=== Spectral type ===
PanSTARRS' photometric survey, has characterized Glo as a LS-type asteroid, a transitional spectral type between the common S-type and rather rare L-type asteroids, which have very different albedos, from as low as 0.039 to as high as 0.383.

=== Rotation period ===
A rotational lightcurve of Glo was obtained from photometric observations by Czech astronomer Petr Pravec at Ondřejov Observatory in January 2006. Lightcurve analysis gave a well-defined rotation period of 6.8782 hours with a brightness variation of 0.33 magnitude (U=3).

=== Diameter and albedo ===
According to the surveys carried out by the Infrared Astronomical Satellite IRAS, and NASA's Wide-field Infrared Survey Explorer with its subsequent NEOWISE mission, Glo measures 6.45 and 13.56 kilometers in diameter and its surface has an albedo of 0.061 and 0.26, respectively. The Collaborative Asteroid Lightcurve Link agrees with IRAS and derives a similar albedo of 0.0725 and a diameter of 13.59 kilometers with an absolute magnitude of 12.8.

== Naming ==
This minor planet was named in honor of Eleanor "Glo" Helin (1932–2009), who was a planetary scientist at JPL and a prolific discoverer of minor planets. The official naming citation was published by the Minor Planet Center on 13 February 1987 (M.P.C. 11641).
