= Gordon Moore (disambiguation) =

Gordon Moore (1929–2023) was an American businessman and engineer who co-founded Intel Corporation.

Gordon Moore may also refer to:

- Gordon Moore (judge) (born 1963), American associate justice of the Minnesota Supreme Court
- Gordon Moore (Royal Navy officer) (1862–1934), Royal Navy officer

== See also ==
- Kate Gordon Moore (1878–1963), American psychologist
- 8013 Gordonmoore, asteroid
