= 10502 Armaghobs =

Mars-crossing asteroid

Discovery
- Discovered by: E. F. Helin
- Discovery site: Palomar Obs.
- Discovery date: 22 August 1987

Designations
- Pronunciation: /ɑːrˈmɑːəbz/ ar-MAH-əbs
- Named after: Armagh Observatory (in Northern Ireland)
- Alternative designations: 1987 QF_{6} · 1980 PJ_{2} 1994 RJ_{29}
- Minor planet category: Mars-crosser

Orbital characteristics
- Epoch 4 September 2017 (JD 2458000.5)
- Uncertainty parameter 0
- Observation arc: 36.73 yr (13,416 days)
- Aphelion: 3.0439 AU
- Perihelion: 1.5745 AU
- Semi-major axis: 2.3092 AU
- Eccentricity: 0.3182
- Orbital period (sidereal): 3.51 yr (1,282 days)
- Mean anomaly: 145.86°
- Mean motion: 0° 16^{m} 51.24^{s} / day
- Inclination: 21.927°
- Longitude of ascending node: 170.23°
- Argument of perihelion: 263.26°

Physical characteristics
- Dimensions: 2.61±0.59 km 2.97 km (calculated)
- Synodic rotation period: 24.978±0.002 h
- Geometric albedo: 0.20 (assumed); 0.22±0.14
- Spectral type: S · Q
- Absolute magnitude (H): 15.0 · 15.18 · 15.44±0.08

10502 Armaghobs (/ɑːrˈmɑːəbz/ ar-MAH-əbz), provisional designation 1987 QF_{6}, is an eccentric, stony asteroid and Mars-crosser from the inner regions of the asteroid belt, approximately 2.6 kilometers in diameter. The asteroid was discovered on 22 August 1987, by American astronomer Eleanor Helin at the Palomar Observatory in California, United States. It was named for the Armagh Observatory in Northern Ireland.

== Orbit and classification ==
Armaghobs orbits the Sun in the inner main-belt at a distance of 1.6–3.0 AU once every 3 years and 6 months (1,282 days). Its orbit has an eccentricity of 0.32 and an inclination of 22° with respect to the ecliptic. It was first identified as 1980 PJ_{2} at ESO's La Silla Observatory in 1980, extending the body's observation arc by 7 years prior to its official discovery observation at Palomar.

== Physical characteristics ==
The Armaghobs has been characterized as a Q-type asteroid by Pan-STARRS photometric survey.

=== Lightcurve ===
In February 2013, a rotational lightcurve of Armaghobs was obtained from photometric observations by Kevin Hills at the Riverland Dingo Observatory at Moorook, South Australia. Lightcurve analysis gave a rotation period of 24.978 hours with a brightness variation of 0.51 magnitude (U=2).

=== Diameter and albedo ===
According to the survey carried out by the NEOWISE mission of NASA's Wide-field Infrared Survey Explorer, Armaghobs measures 2.61 kilometers in diameter and its surface has an albedo of 0.22. The Collaborative Asteroid Lightcurve Link assumes a standard albedo for stony asteroids of 0.20, and calculates a diameter of 2.97 kilometers with an absolute magnitude of 15.0.

== Naming ==
This minor planet was named after the Armagh Observatory in Northern Ireland. The present-day astronomical research institute was founded by Archbishop Richard Robinson in 1790. The Estonian astronomer Ernst Öpik, after whom 2099 Öpik is named, had been a long-time member of the Observatory. It is also known for the invention of the cup-anemometer by Thomas Robinson, the New General Catalogue compiled by John Dreyer, and Lindsay's Armagh-Dunsink-Harvard telescope. The official naming citation was published by the Minor Planet Center on 9 January 2001 (M.P.C. 41937).
