= 3988 =

3988 may refer to:

- 3988 Huma, an asteroid discovered in 1980
- 3988, a year in the 4th millennium
- 3988 BC, a year in the 40th century BC
- Bank of China (SEHK: 3988)
