= (8014) 1990 MF =

Minor planet

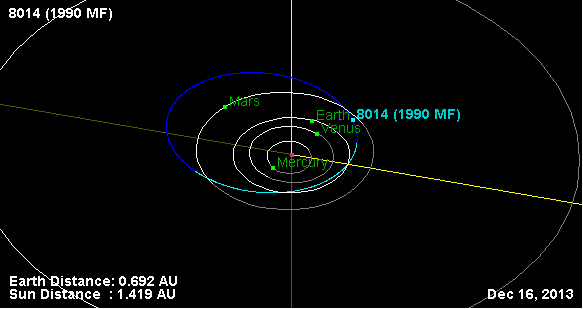
- Orbital diagram of 1990 MF

Discovery
- Discovered by: E. Helin
- Discovery site: Palomar Obs.
- Discovery date: 26 June 1990

Orbital characteristics
- Epoch 13 January 2016 (JD 2457400.5)
- Uncertainty parameter 0
- Observation arc: 9080 days (24.86 yr)
- Aphelion: 2.5433 AU (380.47 Gm)
- Perihelion: 0.94958 AU (142.055 Gm)
- Semi-major axis: 1.7464 AU (261.26 Gm)
- Eccentricity: 0.45627
- Orbital period (sidereal): 2.31 yr (842.99 d)
- Mean anomaly: 5.3502°
- Mean motion: 0° 25^{m} 37.38^{s} / day
- Inclination: 1.8662°
- Longitude of ascending node: 210.26°
- Argument of perihelion: 114.40°
- Earth MOID: 0.0168027 AU (2.51365 Gm)

Physical characteristics
- Mean diameter: 700 m (2,300 ft)
- Absolute magnitude (H): 18.7

(8014) 1990 MF is a sub-kilometer near-Earth object and potentially hazardous asteroid in the Apollo group. It was discovered by American astronomer Eleanor Helin at the Palomar Observatory in California on 26 June 1990. The asteroid measures approximately 0.7 kilometers (0.4 miles) in diameter. On 23 July 2020, it came within 0.055 AU of the Earth—about 21 times the Moon's distance.
