= Brian P. Roman =

American astronomer

Minor planets discovered: 11
4490 Bambery	July 14, 1988	MPC ^{[1]}
4954 Eric	September 23, 1990	MPC
(5131) 1990 BG	January 21, 1990	MPC ^{[1]}
5186 Donalu	September 22, 1990	MPC
5588 Jennabelle	September 23, 1990	MPC
5620 Jasonwheeler	July 19, 1990	MPC ^{[1]}
12272 Geddylee	September 22, 1990	MPC
19155 Lifeson	September 22, 1990	MPC
23469 Neilpeart	September 22, 1990	MPC
(24693) 1990 SB_{2}	September 23, 1990	MPC
(29180) 1990 SW_{1}	September 22, 1990	MPC
^{1} co-discovery with Eleanor Helin

Brian P. Roman is an American astronomer.

He has co-discovered the periodic comets 111P/Helin–Roman–Crockett, 117P/Helin–Roman–Alu and 132P/Helin–Roman–Alu. Brian Roman is also credited by the Minor Planet Center with the discovery of 11 minor planet between 1988 and 1990, including 4954 Eric, a near-Earth asteroid of the Apollo group. All of his discoveries were made at Palomar Observatory, where he also participated in the Planet-Crossing Asteroid Survey.

The main-belt asteroid 4575 Broman, discovered by American astronomer Eleanor Helin in 1987, was named in his honour.
