= 3043 San Diego =

Hungaria asteroid and slow rotator

Discovery
- Discovered by: E. F. Helin
- Discovery site: Palomar Obs.
- Discovery date: 20 September 1982

Designations
- Named after: San Diego (city)
- Alternative designations: 1982 SA · 1974 SQ_{2}
- Minor planet category: main-belt · Hungaria

Orbital characteristics
- Epoch 4 September 2017 (JD 2458000.5)
- Uncertainty parameter 0
- Observation arc: 41.90 yr (15,305 days)
- Aphelion: 2.1323 AU
- Perihelion: 1.7210 AU
- Semi-major axis: 1.9266 AU
- Eccentricity: 0.1067
- Orbital period (sidereal): 2.67 yr (977 days)
- Mean anomaly: 7.5114°
- Mean motion: 0° 22^{m} 6.96^{s} / day
- Inclination: 21.788°
- Longitude of ascending node: 351.11°
- Argument of perihelion: 31.747°

Physical characteristics
- Dimensions: 4.62 km (calculated); 4.771±0.022 km 5.040±0.082 km
- Synodic rotation period: 30.72±0.02 h (wrong); 105.7±0.1 h (re-examined)
- Geometric albedo: 0.252±0.048; 0.2817±0.0408; 0.30 (assumed)
- Spectral type: E
- Absolute magnitude (H): 13.6 · 13.7

3043 San Diego, provisional designation 1982 SA, is a stony Hungaria asteroid and slow rotator from the inner regions of the asteroid belt, approximately 4.7 kilometers in diameter.

It was discovered by American astronomer Eleanor Helin on 30 September 1982, at the U.S. Palomar Observatory in California, and named for the city of San Diego.

== Classification and orbit ==
The bright E-type asteroid is a member of the Hungaria family, which form the innermost dense concentration of asteroids in the Solar System. The asteroid orbits the Sun at a distance of 1.7–2.1 AU once every 2 years and 8 months (977 days). Its orbit has an eccentricity of 0.11 and an inclination of 22° with respect to the ecliptic. The first observation was taken at Crimea–Nauchnij in 1974, extending the asteroid's observation arc by 8 years prior to its discovery.

== Slow rotator ==
San Diego is a slow rotator. In March 2005, a rotational lightcurve was obtained from photometric observations by American astronomer Brian Warner at his Palmer Divide Observatory (716) in Colorado. It gave a long rotation period of 105.7 hours with a brightness variation of 0.60 in magnitude (U=3-). The period was derived from a re-examined lightcurve that originally gave a much shorter period of 30.72±0.02 hours with an amplitude of 0.37 in magnitude (U=0). This previously published period was only preliminary and is now considered wrong upon re-examination.

== Diameter and albedo ==
According to the survey carried out by the NEOWISE mission of NASA's Wide-field Infrared Survey Explorer, San Diego measures 4.8 and 5.0 kilometers in diameter and its surface has an albedo of 0.25 and 0.28, respectively, while the Collaborative Asteroid Lightcurve Link assumes an albedo of 0.30 – a compromise value between 0.4 and 0.2, corresponding to the Hungaria asteroids both as family and orbital group – and calculates a diameter of 4.6 kilometers with an absolute magnitude of 13.7.

== Naming ==
This minor planet was named for the city of San Diego, California, in appreciation of the city council's efforts to reduce the local light pollution. Palomar mountain is located within San Diego County, California, and the astronomers at the site were concerned that the light pollution from the city would ruin their ability to use the observatory. The council had voted to use Low-Pressure Sodium (LPS) vapor lamps for their street lights. This fixture only emitted light at one wavelength, which astronomers could readily filter out. The approved naming citation was published by the Minor Planet Center on 13 July 1984 (M.P.C. 8914).
