= 4790 Petrpravec =

Asteroid

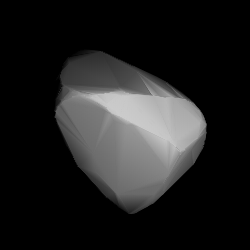
- Shape model of Petrpravec from its lightcurve

Discovery
- Discovered by: E. F. Helin
- Discovery site: Palomar Obs.
- Discovery date: 9 August 1988

Designations
- Named after: Petr Pravec (Czech astronomer)
- Alternative designations: 1988 PP · 1978 EA_{1}
- Minor planet category: main-belt · (middle) background · Eunomia

Orbital characteristics
- Epoch 23 March 2018 (JD 2458200.5)
- Uncertainty parameter 0
- Observation arc: 40.21 yr (14,685 d)
- Aphelion: 2.8502 AU
- Perihelion: 2.4002 AU
- Semi-major axis: 2.6252 AU
- Eccentricity: 0.0857
- Orbital period (sidereal): 4.25 yr (1,554 d)
- Mean anomaly: 80.278°
- Mean motion: 0° 13^{m} 54.12^{s} / day
- Inclination: 12.720°
- Longitude of ascending node: 131.48°
- Argument of perihelion: 84.770°

Physical characteristics
- Mean diameter: 14.40±4.13 km 14.53±1.05 km 16.16±4.77 km 16.217±0.096 km 17.160±5.818 km 17.62±1.5 km
- Synodic rotation period: undetermined
- Geometric albedo: 0.0336±0.0384; 0.038±0.007; 0.047±0.042; 0.05±0.04; 0.1084±0.021; 0.160±0.024
- Spectral type: C (Pan-STARRS); C (SDSS-MOC)
- Absolute magnitude (H): 11.80; 12.8; 12.90; 13.0; 13.15; 13.15±0.18; 13.17

4790 Petrpravec (prov. designation: 1988 PP) is a carbonaceous background asteroid from the central regions of the asteroid belt, approximately 16 kilometers (10 miles) in diameter. It was discovered on 9 August 1988, by American astronomer Eleanor Helin at the Palomar Observatory in California, and was later named for Czech astronomer Petr Pravec.

== Orbit and classification ==
Petrpravec is a non-family asteroid of the main belt's background population when applying the hierarchical clustering method to its proper orbital elements. Based on osculating Keplerian orbital elements, the asteroid has also been classified as a member of the Eunomia family (502), a prominent family of stony S-type asteroid and the largest one in the intermediate main belt with more than 5,000 members.

It orbits the Sun in the central asteroid belt at a distance of 2.4–2.9 AU once every 4 years and 3 months (1,554 days; semi-major axis of 2.63 AU). Its orbit has an eccentricity of 0.09 and an inclination of 13° with respect to the ecliptic. The body's observation arc begins with its first observation as 1978 EA_{1} at Crimea–Nauchnij in March 1978, more than 10 years prior to its official discovery observation at Palomar.

== Naming ==
This minor planet was named after Petr Pravec (born 1967), a Czech astronomer and prolific photometrist of comets, near-Earth and binary asteroids. He has often been the first person to observe objects found in the course of the discoverer's Near-Earth Asteroid Tracking program following their tentative announcement in the Minor Planet Center's (MPC) "NEO Confirmation Page". The official naming citation was published by the Minor Planet Center on 20 June 1997 on the occasion of his marriage with Kateřina Macháčová the following day (M.P.C. 30095).

== Physical characteristics ==
In the SDSS-based taxonomy, Petrpravec is a poorly determined, carbonaceous C-type asteroid. It has also been characterized as a dark C-type by the Pan-STARRS' survey.

=== Rotation period ===
A rotational lightcurve of Petrpravec from photometric observations at the Oakley Southern Sky Observatory in February 2012, gave a brightness variation of only 0.02 magnitude and was insufficient to determine a rotation period.

=== Diameter and albedo ===
According to the surveys carried out by the Japanese Akari satellite, the NEOWISE mission of NASA's Wide-field Infrared Survey Explorer and the Infrared Astronomical Satellite IRAS, Petrpravec measures between 14.4 and 17.6 kilometers in diameter and its surface has an albedo between 0.0336 and 0.160.

The Collaborative Asteroid Lightcurve Link derives an albedo of 0.0369 and a diameter of 17.37 kilometers based on an absolute magnitude of 13.0.
