= 4525 Johnbauer =

Main-belt asteroid

Discovery
- Discovered by: E. F. Helin; E. Shoemaker; P. D. Wilder
- Discovery site: Palomar Obs.
- Discovery date: 15 May 1982

Designations
- Named after: John Bauer (San Diego City College)
- Alternative designations: 1982 JB_{3} · 1951 YF; 1988 XX
- Minor planet category: main-belt · (middle); Mitidika

Orbital characteristics
- Epoch 4 September 2017 (JD 2458000.5)
- Uncertainty parameter 0
- Observation arc: 60.94 yr (22,260 days)
- Aphelion: 3.0906 AU
- Perihelion: 2.0552 AU
- Semi-major axis: 2.5729 AU
- Eccentricity: 0.2012
- Orbital period (sidereal): 4.13 yr (1,507 days)
- Mean anomaly: 308.59°
- Mean motion: 0° 14^{m} 19.68^{s} / day
- Inclination: 13.529°
- Longitude of ascending node: 72.981°
- Argument of perihelion: 30.621°

Physical characteristics
- Dimensions: 10.118±0.050 km
- Geometric albedo: 0.034±0.005
- Absolute magnitude (H): 13.5

4525 Johnbauer, provisional designation 1982 JB_{3}, is dark Mitidika asteroid from the central regions of the asteroid belt, approximately 10 kilometers in diameter. It was discovered on 15 May 1982, by astronomers, Eleanor Helin and Eugene Shoemaker, as well as Peter Wilder at the Palomar Observatory in California, United States. The asteroid was named after John Bauer, physics teacher at San Diego City College.

== Orbit and classification ==
Johnbauer has been identified as a member of the Mitidika family, a dispersed asteroid family of typically carbonaceous C-type asteroids. The family is named after 2262 Mitidika (diameter of 9 km) and consists of 653 known members, the largest ones being 404 Arsinoë (95 km) and 5079 Brubeck (17 km).

It orbits the Sun in the central main-belt at a distance of 2.1–3.1 AU once every 4 years and 2 months (1,507 days). Its orbit has an eccentricity of 0.20 and an inclination of 14° with respect to the ecliptic.

The asteroid was first identified as 1951 YF at the McDonald Observatory in December 1951. The body's observation arc begins more than 26 years prior to its official discovery observation, with a precovery taken at Palomar in November 1955.

== Physical characteristics ==
=== Rotation period ===
As of 2017, no rotational lightcurve of Johnbauer has been obtained from photometric observations. The body's rotation period, spin axis and shape remains unknown.

=== Diameter and albedo ===
According to the survey carried out by the NEOWISE mission of NASA's Wide-field Infrared Survey Explorer, Johnbauer measures 10.118 kilometers in diameter and its surface has a low albedo of 0.034.

== Naming ==
This minor planet was named in memory of John Bauer (1932–2002), a long-time teacher of astronomy and physics at San Diego City College in San Diego, California, who over the course of forty years (1962-2002), inspired hundreds of students to pursue professional and academic careers in astronomy and physics. The name was suggested by N. Butler. The official naming citation was published by the Minor Planet Center on 13 April 2006 (M.P.C. 56611).
