= 117P/Helin–Roman–Alu =

Jupiter-family comet

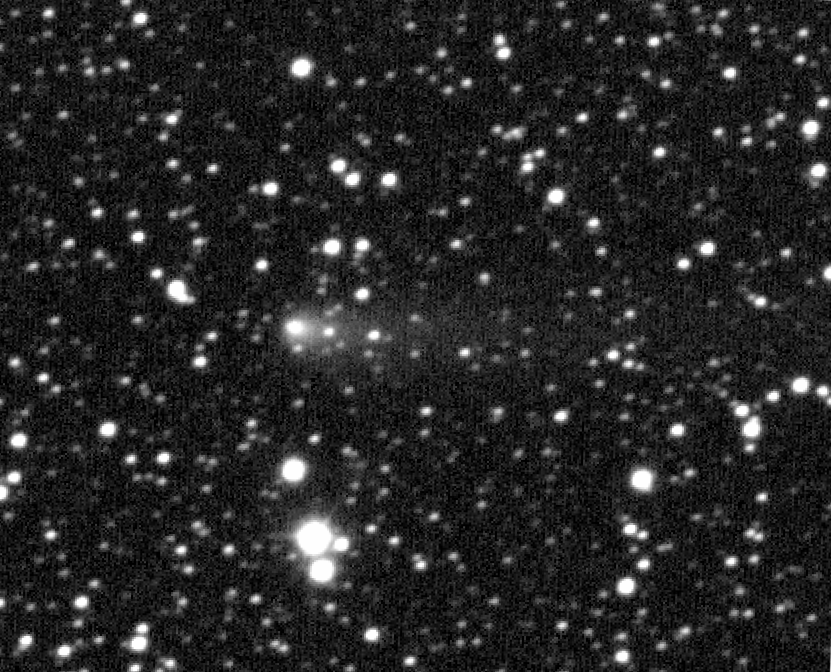
- Comet Helin–Roman–Alu 1 imaged from the Zwicky Transient Facility on 4 June 2022

Discovery
- Discovered by: Eleanor F. Helin; Brian P. Roman; Jeff Alu
- Discovery date: 2 October 1989

Designations
- MPC designation: P/1989 T2
- Alternative designations: Helin–Roman–Alu 1; 1987 XXXVII, 1989w

Orbital characteristics
- Epoch: 21 November 2025 (JD 2461000.5)
- Observation arc: 37.44 years (Note: Observation arc from the Minor Planet Center database covering dates from 10 August 1988 until 18 January 2026.)
- Earliest precovery date: 10 August 1988
- Number of observations: 6,945
- Aphelion: 5.158 AU
- Perihelion: 3.089 AU
- Semi-major axis: 4.124 AU
- Eccentricity: 0.25084
- Orbital period: 8.375 years
- Inclination: 8.662°
- Longitude of ascending node: 58.785°
- Argument of periapsis: 224.92°
- Mean anomaly: 144.68°
- Last perihelion: 7 July 2022
- Next perihelion: 26 November 2030
- T_{Jupiter}: 2.967
- Earth MOID: 2.046 AU
- Jupiter MOID: 0.257 AU

Physical characteristics
- Mean radius: <16.4 km (10.2 mi)
- Comet total magnitude (M1): 5.7
- Comet nuclear magnitude (M2): 11.4

117P/Helin–Roman–Alu, also known as Helin–Roman–Alu 1, is a Jupiter-family comet with an 8.38-year orbit around the Sun. It is also classified as a quasi-Hilda comet. It is the second of three comets co-discovered by Eleanor F. Helin, Brian P. Roman, and Jeff Alu. (Note: The other two comets discovered by the three astronomers were C/1989 T1 (Helin–Roman–Alu) and 132P/Helin–Roman–Alu respectively.)

== Physical characteristics ==
Preliminary estimates by James V. Scotti in 1994 revealed that the nucleus of Comet Helin–Roman–Alu 1 is roughly 9.0 km (5.6 mi) in diameter. Later estimates in 2005 revealed a much larger nucleus at approximately 32.8 km (20.4 mi), though it is highly likely that the strong activity seen from the comet at the time were contaminating the data obtained.

== See also ==
- Comet Helin

== Notes ==
Numbered comets
Previous; 116P/Wild	117P/Helin–Roman–Alu	Next; 118P/Shoemaker–Levy
