= 3757 Anagolay =

Eccentric near-Earth asteroid

Discovery
- Discovered by: E. F. Helin
- Discovery site: Palomar Obs.
- Discovery date: 14 December 1982

Designations
- Named after: Anagolay (Philippine mythology)
- Alternative designations: 1982 XB
- Minor planet category: Amor · NEO · PHA

Orbital characteristics
- Epoch 4 September 2017 (JD 2458000.5)
- Uncertainty parameter 0
- Observation arc: 31.62 yr (11,551 days)
- Aphelion: 2.6522 AU
- Perihelion: 1.0175 AU
- Semi-major axis: 1.8349 AU
- Eccentricity: 0.4455
- Orbital period (sidereal): 2.49 yr (908 days)
- Mean anomaly: 342.62°
- Mean motion: 0° 23^{m} 47.4^{s} / day
- Inclination: 3.8679°
- Longitude of ascending node: 74.969°
- Argument of perihelion: 17.149°
- Earth MOID: 0.0386 AU · 15 LD

Physical characteristics
- Dimensions: 0.39 km 0.5 km
- Synodic rotation period: 9.0046±0.0013 h 9.012 h
- Geometric albedo: 0.18; 0.26 (derived); 0.34
- Spectral type: Tholen = S B–V = 0.859±0.012; U–B = 0.522±0.009
- Absolute magnitude (H): 18.85 · 18.95 · 19.12±0.06

3757 Anagolay, provisional designation 1982 XB, is a highly eccentric asteroid, classified as a potentially hazardous asteroid and a near-Earth object of the Amor group, approximately half a kilometer in diameter. It was discovered on 14 December 1982, by American astronomer Eleanor Helin at the Palomar Observatory in California, United States. The asteroid was named after Anagolay from Philippine mythology.

== Orbit and classification ==
Anagolay orbits the Sun in the inner main-belt at a distance of 1.0–2.7 AU once every 2 years and 6 months (908 days). Its orbit has an eccentricity of 0.45 and an inclination of 4° with respect to the ecliptic.

It is a potentially hazardous asteroid because its Earth minimum orbit intersection distance (MOID) is less than 0.05 AU and its diameter is greater than 150 meters. Its Earth-MOID is 0.0386 AU (5,770,000 km) which corresponds to 15 lunar distances. Its orbit is well-determined for the next several hundred years. The body's observation arc begins in 1986, as no precoveries and no identifications prior to its discovery were made.

== Physical characteristics ==
In the Tholen classification, Anagolay is a silicaceous S-type asteroid.

Based on two rotational lightcurves obtained in the 1980s, Anagolay has a rotation period of 9.012 hours and a brightness variation of 0.20 and 0.21 in magnitude, respectively (U=n.a.). A third lightcurve, also from the 1980s, gave an alternative period of 9.0046±0.0013 hours with an amplitude of 0.14 (U=2-). The body's albedo lies between 0.18 and 0.34, with the Collaborative Asteroid Lightcurve Link (CALL) deriving an intermediate albedo of 0.26. CALL also assumes a diameter of 390 meters.

== Naming ==
This minor planet was named after Anagolay, the goddess of the lost things worshipped by pre-Hispanic Tagalogs. In Philippine mythology, Anagolay is the daughter of the hermaphroditic agricultural deity Lakampati (also goddess Ikapati).

The name, suggested by Filipino student Mohammad Abqary Alon, was selected among 85 other suggestions in a contest held by the Space Generation Advisory Council's "Name-An-Asteroid" campaign. The official naming citation was published by the Minor Planet Center on 9 September 2014 (M.P.C. 89832).
