= 5208 Royer =

Asteroid

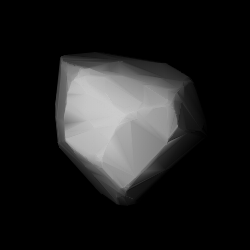
- Shape model of Royer from its lightcurve

Discovery
- Discovered by: E. F. Helin
- Discovery site: Palomar Obs.
- Discovery date: 6 February 1989

Designations
- Named after: Msgr Ronald E. Royer (American priest and amateur astronomer)
- Alternative designations: 1989 CH_{1}
- Minor planet category: main-belt · (middle); Maria

Orbital characteristics
- Epoch 23 March 2018 (JD 2458200.5)
- Uncertainty parameter 0
- Observation arc: 64.29 yr (23,481 d)
- Aphelion: 2.7241 AU
- Perihelion: 2.4844 AU
- Semi-major axis: 2.6042 AU
- Eccentricity: 0.0460
- Orbital period (sidereal): 4.20 yr (1,535 d)
- Mean anomaly: 345.72°
- Mean motion: 0° 14^{m} 4.2^{s} / day
- Inclination: 15.904°
- Longitude of ascending node: 124.56°
- Argument of perihelion: 21.407°

Physical characteristics
- Mean diameter: 7.884±0.150 km 8.081±0.121 km 9.40 km (calculated)
- Synodic rotation period: 3.866 h 3.88494±0.00005 h
- Geometric albedo: 0.20 (assumed); 0.270±0.059; 0.2854±0.0197
- Spectral type: SMASS = S
- Absolute magnitude (H): 12.5; 12.6

5208 Royer (prov. designation: 1989 CH_{1}) is a stony Marian asteroid from the central regions of the asteroid belt, approximately 8 kilometers (5 miles) in diameter. It was discovered on 6 February 1989, by astronomer Eleanor Helin at the Palomar Observatory. The S-type asteroid has a rotation period of 3.87 hours and was named after American priest and amateur astronomer, Ronald Royer.

== Orbit and classification ==
Royer is a member of the Maria family (506), a large family of stony asteroids with nearly 3,000 known members.

It orbits the Sun in the central asteroid belt at a distance of 2.5–2.7 AU once every 4 years and 2 months (1,535 days; semi-major axis of 2.6 AU). Its orbit has an eccentricity of 0.05 and an inclination of 16° with respect to the ecliptic. The body's observation arc begins with a precovery taken at Palomar Observatory in November 1953, more than 35 years prior to its official discovery observation.

== Naming ==
This minor planet was named after Reverend Ronald E. Royer, an American priest as well as amateur astronomer and astrophotographer. He has been a member of the Los Angeles Astronomical Society (LAAS) since 1946 and received the G. Bruce Blair Award in 2001. The official naming citation was published by the Minor Planet Center on 6 April 1993 (M.P.C. 21957).

== Physical characteristics ==
In the SMASS classification, Royer is a common, stony S-type asteroid.

=== Rotation period and poles ===
In 2004, a rotational lightcurve of Royer was obtained from photometric observations by Brazilian and Argentine astronomers. Lightcurve analysis gave a rotation period of 3.866 hours with a brightness amplitude of 0.44 magnitude (U=2). In 2016, a modeled lightcurves using photometric data from various sources, rendered a sidereal period of 3.88494 and two spin axes of (258.0°, 74.0°) and (54.0°, 37.0°) in ecliptic coordinates.

=== Diameter and albedo ===
According to the survey carried out by the NEOWISE mission of NASA's Wide-field Infrared Survey Explorer, Royer measures 7.884 and 8.081 kilometers in diameter and its surface has an albedo of 0.2854 and 0.270, respectively, while the Collaborative Asteroid Lightcurve Link assumes a standard albedo for stony asteroids of 0.20 and calculates a diameter of 9.40 kilometers based on an absolute magnitude of 12.5.
