= 4957 Brucemurray =

Stony asteroid

Discovery
- Discovered by: E. F. Helin
- Discovery site: Palomar Obs.
- Discovery date: 15 December 1990

Designations
- Named after: Bruce C. Murray (American planetary scientist)
- Alternative designations: 1990 XJ
- Minor planet category: NEO · Amor; Mars-crosser

Orbital characteristics
- Epoch 4 September 2017 (JD 2458000.5)
- Uncertainty parameter 0
- Observation arc: 41.35 yr (15,102 days)
- Aphelion: 1.9082 AU
- Perihelion: 1.2228 AU
- Semi-major axis: 1.5655 AU
- Eccentricity: 0.2189
- Orbital period (sidereal): 1.96 yr (715 days)
- Mean anomaly: 282.15°
- Mean motion: 0° 30^{m} 11.52^{s} / day
- Inclination: 35.011°
- Longitude of ascending node: 254.90°
- Argument of perihelion: 97.487°
- Earth MOID: 0.4258 AU · 165.9 LD

Physical characteristics
- Dimensions: 3.01 km 3.06 km 3.11 km (calculated); 3.499±0.095 km
- Synodic rotation period: 2.892 h 2.8922 h
- Geometric albedo: 0.132±0.023; 0.17; 0.18; 0.18±0.19; 0.20 (assumed)
- Spectral type: SMASS = S · S B–V = 0.866±0.042; V–R = 0.526±0.018; V–I = 0.956±0.021
- Absolute magnitude (H): 14.9 · 15.1 · 15.10±0.3

4957 Brucemurray, provisional designation 1990 XJ, is a stony asteroid, classified as near-Earth object of the Amor group and as Mars-crosser, approximately 3 kilometers in diameter. It was discovered by American astronomer Eleanor Helin at the Palomar Observatory in California on 15 December 1990. The asteroid was named after American planetary scientist Bruce C. Murray.

== Orbit and classification ==
Brucemurray orbits the Sun at a distance of 1.2–1.9 AU once every 1 years and 12 months (715 days). Its orbit has an eccentricity of 0.22 and an inclination of 35° with respect to the ecliptic.

The body's observation arc begins with a precovery taken at the Australian Siding Spring Observatory in March 1976, or more than 14 years prior to its official discovery observation.

=== Close approaches ===
This deep Mars-crosser makes close approaches both to Earth and Mars. It has an Earth minimum orbital intersection distance of 0.4258 AU (63,700,000 km) which corresponds to 165.9 lunar distances. On 18 May 2033, the asteroid will also pass 0.0684 AU (10,230,000 km) from Mars.

== Physical characteristics ==
In the SMASS classification, Brucemurray is a stony S-type asteroid. BVRIZ photometry also found that the asteroid is an S-type NEO.

=== Rotation period and axis ===
In the 1990s, two rotational lightcurves of Brucemurray were obtained from photometric observations by Czech astronomer Petr Pravec at Ondřejov Observatory. Lightcurve analysis gave a rotation period of 2.892 hours in both cases with a brightness variation of 0.28 and 0.36 magnitude, respectively (U=2/3).

In 2004, an international study modeled a lightcurve with a concurring period of 2.8922 hours and found a spin axis of (358.0°, −50.0°) in ecliptic coordinates (λ, β) (Q=3-).

=== Diameter and albedo ===
According to the survey carried out by the NEOWISE mission of Wide-field Infrared Survey Explorer and the ExploreNEOs survey using the Spitzer Space Telescope, Brucemurray measures between 3.01 and 3.499 kilometers in diameter and its surface has an albedo between 0.132 and 0.18.

The Collaborative Asteroid Lightcurve Link assumes a standard albedo for stony asteroids of 0.20 and calculates a diameter of 3.11 kilometers based on an absolute magnitude of 14.9.

== Naming ==
This minor planet was named after American planetary scientist Bruce C. Murray (1931–2013), director of the Jet Propulsion Laboratory, co-founder of The Planetary Society and professor at California Institute of Technology. This asteroid which comes close both to Mars and Earth, is considered a particularly appropriate object for Murray, who had diligently championed a mission to Mars.

The official naming citation was published by the Minor Planet Center on 29 November 1993 (M.P.C. 22829).
