= 132P/Helin–Roman–Alu =

Jupiter-family comet

132P/Helin-Roman-Alu
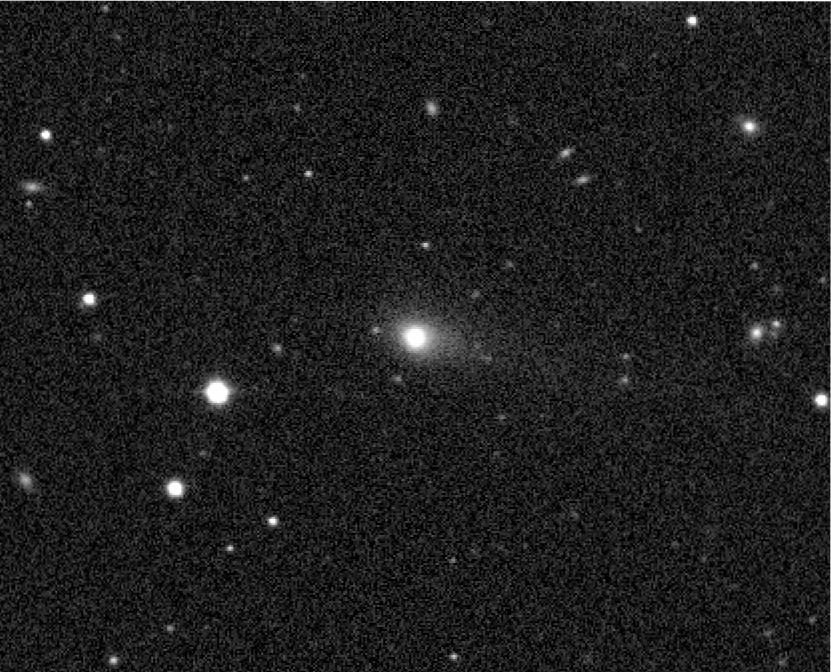
- Comet Helin–Roman–Alu 2 imaged from the Zwicky Transient Facility on 4 October 2021

Discovery
- Discovered by: Eleanor F. Helin; Brian P. Roman; Jeff Alu
- Discovery date: 26 October 1989

Designations
- MPC designation: P/1989 U1, P/1997 N2
- Alternative designations: Helin–Roman–Alu 2; 1989 XVI, 1989y

Orbital characteristics
- Epoch: 21 November 2025 (JD 2461000.5)
- Observation arc: 32.43 years (Note: Observation arc from the Minor Planet Center database covering dates from 26 October 1989 until 2 April 2022.)
- Number of observations: 1,566
- Aphelion: 6.088 AU
- Perihelion: 1.698 AU
- Semi-major axis: 3.893 AU
- Eccentricity: 0.56380
- Orbital period: 7.681 years
- Inclination: 5.376°
- Longitude of ascending node: 173.97°
- Argument of periapsis: 216.52°
- Mean anomaly: 188.53°
- Last perihelion: 13 November 2021
- Next perihelion: 19 July 2029
- T_{Jupiter}: 2.759
- Earth MOID: 0.699 AU
- Jupiter MOID: 0.015 AU

Physical characteristics
- Mean radius: 0.89 km (0.55 mi)
- Mean density: 410±60 kg/m^{3}
- Comet total magnitude (M1): 10.2
- Comet nuclear magnitude (M2): 15.1

132P/Helin–Roman–Alu, also known as Helin–Roman–Alu 2, is a Jupiter-family comet with a 7.68-year orbit around the Sun. It is the third of three comets co-discovered by Eleanor F. Helin, Brian P. Roman, and Jeff Alu. (Note: The other two comets discovered by the three astronomers were C/1989 T1 (Helin–Roman–Alu) and 117P/Helin–Roman–Alu respectively.)

== See also ==
- Comet Helin

== Notes ==
Numbered comets
Previous; 131P/Mueller	132P/Helin–Roman–Alu	Next; 133P/Elst–Pizarro
