= 1982 Cline =

Stony main-belt asteroid

Discovery
- Discovered by: E. F. Helin
- Discovery site: Palomar Obs.
- Discovery date: 4 November 1975

Designations
- Named after: Edwin Cline (inventor)
- Alternative designations: 1975 VA · 1936 OO; 1957 LN · 1961 XC; 1961 XK · 1973 AS
- Minor planet category: main-belt · (inner)

Orbital characteristics
- Epoch 4 September 2017 (JD 2458000.5)
- Uncertainty parameter 0
- Observation arc: 59.91 yr (21,882 days)
- Aphelion: 2.8858 AU
- Perihelion: 1.7351 AU
- Semi-major axis: 2.3104 AU
- Eccentricity: 0.2490
- Orbital period (sidereal): 3.51 yr (1,283 days)
- Mean anomaly: 18.924°
- Mean motion: 0° 16^{m} 50.16^{s} / day
- Inclination: 6.8421°
- Longitude of ascending node: 42.366°
- Argument of perihelion: 279.57°

Physical characteristics
- Dimensions: 6.03±0.17 km 7.21±0.50 km 8.100±0.030 km 8.18 km (calculated); 8.401±0.064 km
- Synodic rotation period: 5.78±0.01 h
- Geometric albedo: 0.194±0.028; 0.20 (assumed); 0.2364±0.0443; 0.340±0.050; 0.369±0.063
- Spectral type: S
- Absolute magnitude (H): 12.5 · 12.56±0.39 · 12.8 · 12.9

1982 Cline, provisional designation 1975 VA, is a stony asteroid from the inner regions of the asteroid belt, approximately 8 kilometers in diameter. It was discovered on 4 November 1975, by American astronomer Eleanor Helin at Palomar Observatory in California, and named after Edwin Lee Cline, inventor and friend of the discoverer.

== Classification and orbit ==
Cline is a stony S-type asteroid that orbits the Sun in the inner main-belt at a distance of 1.7–2.9 AU once every 3 years and 6 months (1,283 days). Its orbit has an eccentricity of 0.25 and an inclination of 7° with respect to the ecliptic. As a main-belt asteroid with a perihelion of less than 1.74 AU, it is not far from being a Mars-crosser (1.67 AU). The first precovery was taken at Johannesburg Observatory (Hartbeespoort, 076) in 1957, extending the asteroid's observation arc by 18 years prior to its discovery.

== Physical characteristics ==
The body's first and only rotational lightcurve of Cline was obtained by American astronomer James W. Birnsfield at the Via Capote Observatory (G69), California, in November 2011. It gave a well-defined rotation period of 5.78±0.01 hours with a brightness variation of 0.36 in magnitude (U=3).

According to the survey carried out by the Japanese Akari satellite and the latest data from the NEOWISE mission of NASA's Wide-field Infrared Survey Explorer, Cline measures 7.2 and 8.1 kilometers in diameter and its surface has an albedo of 0.194 of 0.34, respectively. Previous results by WISE/NEOWISE also gave a diameter of 6.03 and 8.4 kilometers. The Collaborative Asteroid Lightcurve Link assumes a standard albedo for stony asteroids of 0.20 and calculates a diameter of 8.18 kilometers with an absolute magnitude of 12.8.

== Naming ==
This minor planet was named in memory of Edwin Lee Cline, a friend of the discoverer and a known inventor in the automotive field who "looked to space as the new frontier". The official naming citation was published by the Minor Planet Center on 18 April 1977 (M.P.C. 4158).
