= (7335) 1989 JA =

Near-Earth asteroid in 2022

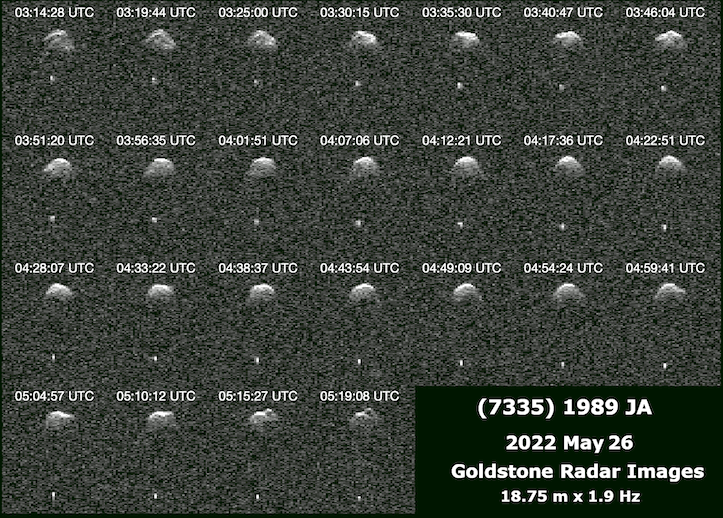
- Radar images of 1989 JA and its satellite, imaged by the Goldstone observatory in May 2022

Discovery
- Discovered by: E. F. Helin
- Discovery site: Palomar Obs.
- Discovery date: 1 May 1989

Designations
- Minor planet category: Apollo · NEO · PHA

Orbital characteristics
- Epoch 4 September 2017 (JD 2458000.5)
- Uncertainty parameter 0
- Observation arc: 27.98 yr (10,221 days)
- Aphelion: 2.6277 AU
- Perihelion: 0.9136 AU
- Semi-major axis: 1.7706 AU
- Eccentricity: 0.4840
- Orbital period (sidereal): 2.36 yr (861 days)
- Mean anomaly: 341.87°
- Mean motion: 0° 25^{m} 5.88^{s} / day
- Inclination: 15.196°
- Longitude of ascending node: 61.325°
- Argument of perihelion: 232.24°
- Earth MOID: 0.0225 AU · 8.8 LD

Physical characteristics
- Dimensions: 0.932±0.153 km 1.18 km (calculated); 1.8 km (outdated)
- Synodic rotation period: <12 h
- Geometric albedo: 0.20 (assumed); 0.31±0.30; 0.322±0.150
- Spectral type: S
- Absolute magnitude (H): 17.0 · 17.8±0.3

(7335) 1989 JA is a stony asteroid of the Apollo group, classified as a near-Earth object and potentially hazardous asteroid, approximately 1 kilometer in diameter. It was discovered on 1 May 1989, by American astronomer Eleanor Helin at the U.S. Palomar Observatory in California. On 27 May 2022, the asteroid made a close approach 0.027 astronomical units (4.0×10^{6} km; 2.5×10^{6} mi) from Earth. During the close approach, optical observations detected signs of an orbiting satellite, which was later confirmed by radar imaging at NASA's Goldstone Solar System Radar in California.

2022 close approach
Date	JPL SBDB nominal geocentric distance	uncertainty region (3-sigma)
2022-05-27	4024703 km	± 153 km

== Orbit and classification ==
The S-type asteroid orbits the Sun at a distance of 0.9–2.6 AU once every 2 years and 4 months (861 days). Its orbit has an eccentricity of 0.48 and an inclination of 15° with respect to the ecliptic. The first observation was made at the discovering observatory in April 1989, extending the asteroid's observation arc by 1 month prior to its discovery observation. It has a minimum orbital intersection distance to Earth of 0.0225 AU (3,370,000 km) which corresponds to 8.8 lunar distances.

== Physical characteristics ==
During its discovery in May 1989, radiometric observations for this asteroid at Arecibo and Goldstone Observatory rendered a rotation period of less than 12 hours (U=n.a.). According to the survey carried out by the NEOWISE mission of NASA's Wide-field Infrared Survey Explorer, the asteroid measures 0.93 kilometers in diameter and its surface has a high albedo of 0.31–0.32, while the Collaborative Asteroid Lightcurve Link assumes a standard albedo for stony asteroids of 0.20 and calculates a diameter of 1.18 kilometers, based on an absolute magnitude of 17.0.

== Naming ==
As of 2022, 1989 JA remains unnamed.
