= 1996 PW =

Small Solar System body

- Discovery images of 1996 PW from NEAT-GEODSS in August 1996

Discovery
- Discovered by: NEAT
- Discovery site: Haleakala Obs.
- Discovery date: 9 August 1996

Designations
- Minor planet category: TNO · damocloid distant · unusual

Orbital characteristics
- Epoch 21 November 2025 (JD 2461000.5)
- Uncertainty parameter 2
- Observation arc: 1.43 yr (524 d)
- Aphelion: 541.93 AU
- Perihelion: 2.5698 AU
- Semi-major axis: 272.25 AU
- Eccentricity: 0.9906
- Orbital period (sidereal): 4492 yr (1,640,761 d)
- Mean anomaly: 2.3480°
- Mean motion: 0° 0^{m} 0.72^{s} / day
- Inclination: 29.691°
- Longitude of ascending node: 144.61°
- Argument of perihelion: 181.88°
- T_{Jupiter}: 1.742

Physical characteristics
- Mean diameter: 7 km 8 km (est. at 0.15); 15 km (est. at 0.04)
- Synodic rotation period: 35.44 h
- Spectral type: Ld (SMASS); D B–R = 0.56±0.04; V–I = 1.03±0.06; V–J = 1.80±0.05; V–H = 2.19±0.05; V–K = 2.32±0.05
- Absolute magnitude (H): 13.9

1996 PW is an exceptionally eccentric trans-Neptunian object and damocloid on an orbit typical of long-period comets but one that showed no sign of cometary activity around the time it was discovered. The unusual object measures approximately 10 kilometers (6 miles) in diameter and has a rotation period of 35.4 hours and likely an elongated shape.

== Description ==
1996 PW orbits the Sun at a distance of 2.5–504 AU once every 4,033 years (semi-major axis of 253 AU). Its orbit has an eccentricity of 0.99 and an inclination of 30° with respect to the ecliptic.

Simulations indicate that it has most likely come from the Oort cloud, with a roughly equal probability of being an extinct comet and a rocky body that was originally scattered into the Oort cloud. The discovery of 1996 PW prompted theoretical research that suggests that roughly 1 to 2 percent of the Oort cloud objects are rocky.

1996 PW was first observed on 9 August 1996 by the Near-Earth Asteroid Tracking (NEAT) automated search camera on Haleakala Observatory, Hawaii. It is the first object that is not an active comet discovered on an orbit typical of long-period comets.

1996 PW has a rotation period of 35.44±0.02 hours and a double-peaked lightcurve with a high amplitude of 0.44±0.03 magnitude (U=3). Its spectrum is moderately red and featureless, typical of D-type asteroids and bare comet nuclei. Its spectrum suggests an extinct comet. The upper limit on 1996 PW's dust production is 0.03 kg/s.

== See also ==
- Extinct comets
- List of Solar System objects by greatest aphelion
