= 6296 Cleveland =

Hungaria asteroid

Discovery
- Discovered by: E. F. Helin
- Discovery site: Palomar Obs.
- Discovery date: 12 July 1988

Designations
- Named after: Cleveland (U.S. city in Ohio)
- Alternative designations: 1988 NC · 1982 BL_{12} 1993 MU
- Minor planet category: main-belt · (inner); Hungaria · background

Orbital characteristics
- Epoch 23 March 2018 (JD 2458200.5)
- Uncertainty parameter 0
- Observation arc: 36.10 yr (13,184 d)
- Aphelion: 2.0081 AU
- Perihelion: 1.7741 AU
- Semi-major axis: 1.8911 AU
- Eccentricity: 0.0619
- Orbital period (sidereal): 2.60 yr (950 d)
- Mean anomaly: 291.58°
- Mean motion: 0° 22^{m} 44.4^{s} / day
- Inclination: 27.052°
- Longitude of ascending node: 111.50°
- Argument of perihelion: 36.759°

Physical characteristics
- Mean diameter: 3.179±0.167 km 3.18±0.17 km 3.74±0.82 km
- Synodic rotation period: 15.38±0.02 h (half period); 15.65±0.04 h (half period); 30.84±0.03 h (Note: Lightcurve plot of 6296 Cleveland, Palmer Divide Observatory, B. D. Warner (2011): Rotation period 30.84±0.03 hours with a brightness amplitude of 0.70±0.03 mag. Quality code is 3. Summary figures for (6296) Cleveland at the LCDB.)
- Geometric albedo: 0.28±0.11; 0.481±0.069
- Spectral type: E (assumed)
- Absolute magnitude (H): 13.90; 14.00±0.59; 14.20; 14.4

6296 Cleveland, provisional designation 1988 NC, is a Hungaria asteroid from the innermost regions of the asteroid belt, approximately 3.5 kilometers (2.2 miles) in diameter. It was discovered on 12 July 1988, by American astronomer Eleanor Helin at the Palomar Observatory in California. The presumed E-type asteroid has a long rotation period of 30.8 hours and possibly an elongated shape. It was named for the city of Cleveland in the U.S. state of Ohio.

== Orbit and classification ==
Cleveland is a Hungaria asteroid, a dynamical group that forms the innermost dense concentration of asteroids in the Solar System. However it is a background asteroid and does not belong to the Hungaria family. It orbits the Sun in the inner main-belt at a distance of 1.8–2.0 AU once every 2 years and 7 months (950 days; semi-major axis of 1.89 AU). Its orbit has an eccentricity of 0.06 and an inclination of 27° with respect to the ecliptic. The body's observation arc begins with its first observation as 1982 BL_{12} at Crimea–Nauchnij in January 1982, more than six years prior to its official discovery observation at Palomar .

== Physical characteristics ==
Cleveland is an assumed E-type asteroid.

=== Rotation period ===
In April 2011, a rotational lightcurve of Cleveland was obtained from photometric observations by American astronomer Brian Warner at his Palmer Divide Observatory in Colorado. Lightcurve analysis gave a rotation period of 30.84 hours with a brightness amplitude of 0.70 magnitude, indicative of a non-spherical shape (U=3). While not being a slow rotator, Cleveland's period is significantly longer than for most other asteroids, which typically have periods between 2 and 20 hours. The result supersedes previous measurements that gave 15.38 and 15.65 hours, or half the period solution of the 2011 measurement (U=2/2).

=== Diameter and albedo ===
According to the survey carried out by the NEOWISE mission of NASA's Wide-field Infrared Survey Explorer, Cleveland measures between 3.179 and 3.74 kilometers in diameter and its surface has an albedo between 0.28 and 0.481.

The Collaborative Asteroid Lightcurve Link adopts an albedo of 0.481 and a diameter of 3.18 kilometers based on an absolute magnitude of 13.9.

== Naming ==
This minor planet was named after the U.S. city of Cleveland as a tribute to its bicentennial celebration. The official naming citation was published by the Minor Planet Center on 9 September 1995 (M.P.C. 25655).
