= 4209 Briggs =

Asteroid

Discovery
- Discovered by: E. Helin
- Discovery site: Palomar Obs.
- Discovery date: 4 October 1986

Designations
- Named after: Geoffrey A. Briggs (American space physicist)
- Alternative designations: 1986 TG_{4} · 1969 SB; 1978 EL_{8} · 1986 WD_{5} 1989 CO_{4}
- Minor planet category: main-belt · (outer); Alauda

Orbital characteristics
- Epoch 4 September 2017 (JD 2458000.5)
- Uncertainty parameter 0
- Observation arc: 47.53 yr (17,360 days)
- Aphelion: 3.4213 AU
- Perihelion: 2.8916 AU
- Semi-major axis: 3.1565 AU
- Eccentricity: 0.0839
- Orbital period (sidereal): 5.61 yr (2,048 days)
- Mean anomaly: 195.76°
- Mean motion: 0° 10^{m} 32.88^{s} / day
- Inclination: 21.614°
- Longitude of ascending node: 330.37°
- Argument of perihelion: 12.512°

Physical characteristics
- Dimensions: 25.39 km (derived); 25.63±2.3 km (IRAS:2); 28.92±0.71 km 29.62±0.61 km 30.895±0.239 km 31.303±0.128
- Synodic rotation period: 12.22±0.02 h 12.235±0.01 h 12.2530±0.0005 h
- Geometric albedo: 0.067±0.013; 0.0827 (derived); 0.0889±0.0256; 0.093±0.012; 0.103±0.006; 0.1288±0.026 (IRAS:2)
- Spectral type: C
- Absolute magnitude (H): 10.8 · 11.20 · 11.3 · 11.57±0.42

4209 Briggs, provisional designation 1986 TG_{4}, is a carbonaceous Alauda asteroid from the outer region of the asteroid belt, approximately 28 kilometers in diameter. It was discovered on 4 October 1986, by American astronomer Eleanor Helin at the Palomar Observatory in California, United States. The asteroid was named after American space physicist Geoffrey A. Briggs.

== Orbit and classification ==
Briggs is a member of the Alauda family (902), a large family of typically bright carbonaceous asteroids and named after its parent body, 702 Alauda.

It orbits the Sun in the outer main-belt at a distance of 2.9–3.4 AU once every 5 years and 7 months (2,048 days). Its orbit has an eccentricity of 0.08 and an inclination of 22° with respect to the ecliptic. The first precovery was obtained at El Leoncito in 1969, extending the asteroid's observation arc by 17 years prior to its discovery.

== Lightcurves ==
A rotational lightcurves of this asteroid was obtained from photometric observations made by American astronomer Brian Warner at his Palmer Divide Observatory (716) in September 2003. The revised lightcurve showed a rotation period of 12.22 hours with a brightness variation of 0.45 in magnitude (U=3-). A second lightcurve from a collaboration of Czech, American and Italian observatories published in November 2013, gave a period of 12.2530 hours (U=n/a).

== Diameter and albedo ==
According to the surveys carried out by the Infrared Astronomical Satellite IRAS, the Japanese Akari satellite, and NASA's Wide-field Infrared Survey Explorer with its NEOWISE mission, the asteroid measures between 25.6 and 31.3 kilometers in diameter and its surface has an albedo in the range of 0.07 to 0.13. The Collaborative Asteroid Lightcurve Link derives an albedo of 0.08 and a diameter of 25.4 kilometer, slightly below the result obtained by IRAS.

== Naming ==
This minor planet was named after American space physicist Geoffrey A. Briggs, director of the Solar System Exploration Division at NASA Headquarters during the 1980s. He was instrumental for the formation of the U.S.–Soviet Joint Working Group for Solar System Exploration and became its co-chairman. He was on the imaging teams for the Mariner, Viking and Voyager missions. Briggs continued to promote space-related accomplishments to the public at the Air and Space Museum. The approved naming citation was published by the Minor Planet Center on 27 June 1991 (M.P.C. 18456).
