= 7336 Saunders =

Stony asteroid and near-Earth object

Discovery
- Discovered by: E. F. Helin
- Discovery site: Palomar Obs.
- Discovery date: 6 September 1989

Designations
- Named after: R. Stephen Saunders (JPL scientist)
- Alternative designations: 1989 RS_{1}
- Minor planet category: NEO · Amor

Orbital characteristics
- Epoch 4 September 2017 (JD 2458000.5)
- Uncertainty parameter 0
- Observation arc: 34.63 yr (12,647 days)
- Aphelion: 3.4148 AU
- Perihelion: 1.1956 AU
- Semi-major axis: 2.3052 AU
- Eccentricity: 0.4813
- Orbital period (sidereal): 3.50 yr (1,278 days)
- Mean anomaly: 353.72°
- Mean motion: 0° 16^{m} 53.76^{s} / day
- Inclination: 7.1958°
- Longitude of ascending node: 174.49°
- Argument of perihelion: 181.51°
- Earth MOID: 0.1908 AU · 74.3 LD

Physical characteristics
- Dimensions: 0.467 km (derived)
- Synodic rotation period: 6 h 6.423±0.004 h (Note: Pravec (2003): rotation period 6.423±0.004 hours with a brightness amplitude of 0.2 mag. Summary figures for (7336) Saunders at Collaborative Asteroid Lightcurve Link (CALL) and Pravec, P.; Wolf, M.; Sarounova, L. (2003))
- Geometric albedo: 0.20 (assumed)
- Spectral type: SMASS = Sq · S
- Absolute magnitude (H): 18.0 · 18.45±0.2 (R) · 18.8 · 19.02±0.112

7336 Saunders, provisional designation 1989 RS_{1}, is a stony asteroid and near-Earth object of the Amor group, approximately 0.5 kilometers in diameter.

The asteroid was discovered on 6 September 1989, by American astronomer Eleanor Helin at Palomar Observatory in California, United States. It was named for JPL-project scientist R. Stephen Saunders.

== Orbit and classification ==
Saunders orbits the Sun at a distance of 1.2–3.4 AU once every 3 years and 6 months (1,278 days). Its orbit has an eccentricity of 0.48 and an inclination of 7° with respect to the ecliptic.

A first precovery was taken at the Australian Siding Spring Observatory in 1982, extending the body's observation arc by 7 years prior to its official discovery at Palomar. It has a minimum orbital intersection distance with Earth of 0.1908 AU (28,500,000 km), which corresponds to 74.3 lunar distances.

== Physical characteristics ==
In the SMASS classification, Saunders is a Sq-type, which transitions from the common S-type to the Q-type asteroids. The Collaborative Asteroid Lightcurve Link assumes a standard albedo for stony asteroids of 0.20 and derives a diameter of 467 meters, based on an absolute magnitude of 19.02.

=== Lightcurve ===
In October 1989, the first photometric observations of Saunders were made with the ESO 1-metre telescope at La Silla in Chile. It gave a rotation period of 6 hours with a brightness variation of 0.3 magnitude (U=2). Another rotational lightcurve was obtained by Czech astronomer Petr Pravec at Ondřejov Observatory in August 2003, giving a period of 6.423±0.004 and an amplitude of 0.2 magnitude (U=n.a.).

== Naming ==
This minor planet was named in honor of JPL-project scientist R. Stephen Saunders (born 1940), director of the RPIF and head scientist of the Solar System Exploration Office. He worked on the Mars Surveyor 2001/03 program and on the Magellan spacecraft, that visited and mapped Venus in 1990. The official naming citation was published by the Minor Planet Center on 26 July 2000 (M.P.C. 41028).
