= 4897 Tomhamilton =

Main-belt asteroid

Discovery
- Discovered by: E. F. Helin
- Discovery site: Palomar Obs.
- Discovery date: 22 August 1987

Designations
- Named after: Thomas William Hamilton (American writer)
- Alternative designations: 1987 QD_{6} · 1971 QV_{1} 1971 SB_{1} · 1990 BN_{1}
- Minor planet category: main-belt · (outer)

Orbital characteristics
- Epoch 4 September 2017 (JD 2458000.5)
- Uncertainty parameter 0
- Observation arc: 66.81 yr (24,402 days)
- Aphelion: 3.4356 AU
- Perihelion: 2.6792 AU
- Semi-major axis: 3.0574 AU
- Eccentricity: 0.1237
- Orbital period (sidereal): 5.35 yr (1,953 days)
- Mean anomaly: 262.29°
- Mean motion: 0° 11^{m} 3.84^{s} / day
- Inclination: 11.067°
- Longitude of ascending node: 188.47°
- Argument of perihelion: 107.13°

Physical characteristics
- Dimensions: 13.711±0.369 km
- Geometric albedo: 0.215±0.065
- Absolute magnitude (H): 12.0

4897 Tomhamilton, provisional designation 1987 QD_{6}, is a stony asteroid from the outer region of the asteroid belt, approximately 14 kilometers in diameter. It was discovered on 22 August 1987, by American astronomer Eleanor Helin at Palomar Observatory, California. It was later named after American writer Thomas William Hamilton, an author of astronomy books and participant in the Apollo program.

== Classification and orbit ==
Tomhamilton orbits the Sun in the outer main-belt at a distance of 2.7–3.4 AU once every 5 years and 4 months (1,953 days). Its orbit has an eccentricity of 0.12 and an inclination of 11° with respect to the ecliptic.

In August 1950, a first precovery was taken at Palomar, extending the asteroid's observation arc by 37 years prior to its official discovery observation. It had also been previously identified as 1971 QV_{1} and 1971 SB_{1} at Crimea–Nauchnij.

On 11 January 2011, it was at opposition (coinciding with Hamilton's 72nd birthday) at a distance of 2.476 AU. Given the moderately elliptical orbit, this asteroid can reach an apparent magnitude from Earth of between 15.3 and 19.5.

== Naming ==
This minor planet was named after Thomas William Hamilton, an American (born January 11, 1939 in San Francisco, died December 24, 2025 in Staten Island) who had worked on the Apollo program, determining fuel requirements and radar accuracy requirements for lunar orbit rendezvous. He later worked as an astronomy educator and planetarium director, and as an author on astronomical topics, as well as of time travel and science fiction novels. Hamilton had interviewed Helin at an astronomical conference for a cable television show he was producing at the time. The official naming citation was published by the Minor Planet Center on 4 October 2009 (M.P.C. 67215).

== Physical characteristics ==
=== Diameter and albedo ===
According to the survey carried out by NASA's Wide-field Infrared Survey Explorer with its subsequent NEOWISE mission, Tomhamilton measures 13.7 kilometers in diameter and its surface has an albedo of 0.215, which indicates that it of a stony rather than of a carbonaceous composition.

=== Lightcurve ===
As of 2017, no rotational lightcurve of Tomhamilton has been obtained from photometric observations. It rotation period, poles and shape remain unknown.
