= 5653 Camarillo =

Asteroid

Discovery
- Discovered by: E. F. Helin; K. Lawrence
- Discovery site: Palomar Obs.
- Discovery date: 21 November 1992

Designations
- Pronunciation: /ˌkæməˈriːoʊ/ KAM-ə-REE-oh
- Named after: Camarillo (city in California)
- Alternative designations: 1992 WD_{5}
- Minor planet category: NEO · Amor

Orbital characteristics
- Epoch 4 September 2017 (JD 2458000.5)
- Uncertainty parameter 0
- Observation arc: 43.23 yr (15,789 days)
- Aphelion: 2.3402 AU
- Perihelion: 1.2484 AU
- Semi-major axis: 1.7943 AU
- Eccentricity: 0.3043
- Orbital period (sidereal): 2.40 yr (878 days)
- Mean anomaly: 77.730°
- Mean motion: 0° 24^{m} 36.36^{s} / day
- Inclination: 6.8739°
- Longitude of ascending node: 9.9739°
- Argument of perihelion: 122.51°
- Earth MOID: 0.2846 AU · 110.9 LD

Physical characteristics
- Dimensions: 1.526 km 1.53 km (taken); 1.537±0.016 km 1.573±0.287 km
- Synodic rotation period: 4.834±0.005 h 4.8346±0.0002 h 4.8350±0.0018 h
- Geometric albedo: 0.2052; 0.220±0.097; 0.271±0.057
- Spectral type: S (Note: Dandy (2003) Optical colors of 56 near-Earth objects: trends with size and orbit. Summary figures for (5653) Camarillo at Collaborative Asteroid Lightcurve Link (CALL)) · S/Sr
- Absolute magnitude (H): 15.83±0.2 (R) (Note: Pravec (1999) web: rotation period 4.834 hours with a brightness amplitude of 0.4 mag. Summary figures for (5653) Camarillo at Collaborative Asteroid Lightcurve Link (CALL)) · 15.980±0.007 (R) · 16.1 · 16.28±0.3 · 16.31±0.33 · 16.42 · 16.42±0.13

5653 Camarillo (/ˌkæməˈriːoʊ/ KAM-ə-REE-oh), provisional designation 1992 WD_{5}, is a stony asteroid and near-Earth object of the Amor group, approximately 1.5 kilometers in diameter.

It was discovered on 21 November 1992, by American astronomers Eleanor Helin and Kenneth Lawrence at Palomar Observatory in California, United States. The asteroid was named for the Californian town of Camarillo.

== Orbit and classification ==
Camarillo orbits the Sun at a distance of 1.2–2.3 AU once every 2 years and 5 months (878 days). Its orbit has an eccentricity of 0.30 and an inclination of 7° with respect to the ecliptic.

It has an Earth minimum orbit intersection distance, MOID, of 0.2846 AU (42,600,000 km), which corresponds to 110.9 lunar distances.

A first precovery was taken at the Australian Siding Spring Observatory in 1974, extending the body's observation arc by 18 years prior to its official discovery observation at Palomar.

== Physical characteristics ==
The S-type asteroid has also been characterized as a Sr-subtype, a transitional group to the R-type asteroids.

=== Lightcurves ===
Between 1995 and 2015, several rotational lightcurves of Camarillo gave a well-defined rotation period of 4.834 hours with a brightness amplitude between 0.4 and 0.85 magnitude.

=== Diameter and albedo ===
According to the surveys carried out by NASA's space-based Wide-field Infrared Survey Explorer with its subsequent NEOWISE mission, Camarillo has an albedo between 0.21 and 0.25 with a corresponding diameter of 1.53 to 1.57 kilometers.

== Naming ==
This minor planet was named after for the Californian town of Camarillo and its Camarillo Observatory (670). The town was named after Adolfo Camarillo (1864–1958), a well known regional rancher. The first discoverer is a former town resident. The official naming citation was published by the Minor Planet Center on 4 August 2001 (M.P.C. 43189).
