= 2099 Öpik =

Mars-crossing asteroid

Discovery
- Discovered by: E. F. Helin
- Discovery site: Palomar Obs.
- Discovery date: 8 November 1977

Designations
- Named after: Ernst Öpik (Estonian astronomer)
- Alternative designations: 1977 VB · 1977 UL_{2}
- Minor planet category: Mars-crosser

Orbital characteristics
- Epoch 4 September 2017 (JD 2458000.5)
- Uncertainty parameter 0
- Observation arc: 60.26 yr (22,009 days)
- Aphelion: 3.1370 AU
- Perihelion: 1.4710 AU
- Semi-major axis: 2.3040 AU
- Eccentricity: 0.3616
- Orbital period (sidereal): 3.50 yr (1,277 days)
- Mean anomaly: 148.76°
- Mean motion: 0° 16^{m} 54.48^{s} / day
- Inclination: 26.966°
- Longitude of ascending node: 218.84°
- Argument of perihelion: 159.18°
- Earth MOID: 0.4926 AU

Physical characteristics
- Dimensions: 5.12 km (calculated); 5.17±1.35 km
- Synodic rotation period: 6.4430±0.0002 h 9.3 h
- Geometric albedo: 0.05±0.06; 0.057 (assumed)
- Spectral type: S (Tholen); Ch (SMASS); C (CALL); B–V = 0.690; U–B = 0.350
- Absolute magnitude (H): 15.18 · 15.22

2099 Öpik, provisional designation 1977 VB, is a dark and eccentric asteroid and Mars-crosser from the inner regions of the asteroid belt, approximately 5.1 kilometers in diameter.

The asteroid was discovered on 8 November 1977, by American astronomer Eleanor Helin at the Palomar Observatory in California, and named after Estonian astronomer Ernst Öpik.

== Orbit and classification ==
Öpik orbits the Sun in the inner main-belt at a distance of 1.5–3.1 AU once every 3 years and 6 months (1,277 days). Its orbit has an eccentricity of 0.36 and an inclination of 27° with respect to the ecliptic. The first used precovery was taken at the discovering observatory in 1970, extending the asteroid's observation arc by 7 years prior to its discovery.

== Physical characteristics ==
Originally, the asteroid's spectral type was that of a bright S-type asteroid in the Tholen classification. More recently, it has been characterized as a dark Ch-type, a hydrated subtype of the carbonaceous C-type asteroids in the SMASS classification, which is in agreement with its low albedo (below).

=== Diameter and albedo ===
According to the survey carried out by NASA's Wide-field Infrared Survey Explorer with its subsequent NEOWISE mission, Öpik measures 5.17 kilometers in diameter and its surface has an albedo of 0.05. The Collaborative Asteroid Lightcurve Link assumes a standard albedo for carbonaceous asteroids of 0.057 and calculates a diameter of 5.12 kilometers with an absolute magnitude of 15.18.

=== Rotation period ===
In 2005, a photometric lightcurve analysis by several astronomers including Pierre Antonini, rendered a rotation period of 6.4430±0.0002 hours and with a brightness amplitude of 0.21 in magnitude (U=2), superseding the results of an observation from the 1990s that gave a longer period of 9.3 hours (U=2).

== Naming ==
This minor planet was named after Estonian astronomer and astrophysicist, Ernst Öpik (1893–1985), who has influenced many fields of astronomy during his 60-year long career. He is noted for developing the discipline of statistical celestial mechanics and for methods to estimate the lifetimes of planet-crossing asteroids. In the early 1950s, he calculated the impact probability of Mars-crossing asteroids with Mars, and concluded that a search for impact craters on Mars would be a fruitful. Fourteen years later, Martian craters were discovered by Mariner 4. The official naming citation was published by the Minor Planet Center on 1 November 1978 (M.P.C. 4548).
