= 8013 Gordonmoore =

Eccentric, stony asteroid and near-Earth object

Discovery
- Discovered by: E. F. Helin
- Discovery site: Palomar Obs.
- Discovery date: 18 May 1990

Designations
- Named after: Gordon Moore (Intel co-founder)
- Alternative designations: 1990 KA
- Minor planet category: NEO · Amor

Orbital characteristics
- Epoch 4 September 2017 (JD 2458000.5)
- Uncertainty parameter 0
- Observation arc: 64.90 yr (23,703 days)
- Earliest precovery date: 1 September 1951
- Aphelion: 3.1498 AU
- Perihelion: 1.2503 AU
- Semi-major axis: 2.2000 AU
- Eccentricity: 0.4317
- Orbital period (sidereal): 3.26 yr (1,192 days)
- Mean anomaly: 126.01°
- Mean motion: 0° 18^{m} 7.2^{s} / day
- Inclination: 7.5685°
- Longitude of ascending node: 105.57°
- Argument of perihelion: 146.73°
- Earth MOID: 0.2472 AU · 96.3 LD

Physical characteristics
- Dimensions: 1.04 km (derived); 2.3 km
- Synodic rotation period: 6 h (dated); 8.40±0.01 h
- Geometric albedo: 0.20 (assumed)
- Spectral type: S
- Absolute magnitude (H): 16.67±0.2 (R) · 16.9 · 17.26±0.149 · 17.26 · 17.27±0.15

8013 Gordonmoore, provisional designation 1990 KA, is an eccentric, stony asteroid and near-Earth object of the Apollo group, approximately 1–2 kilometers in diameter.

The asteroid was discovered on 18 May 1990, by American astronomer Eleanor Helin at Palomar Observatory in California, United States. It was named after Intel co-founder Gordon Moore.

== Orbit and classification ==
Gordonmoore orbits the Sun at a distance of 1.3–3.1 AU once every 3 years and 3 months (1,192 days). Its orbit has an eccentricity of 0.43 and an inclination of 8° with respect to the ecliptic.

It has a minimum orbit intersection distance with Earth of 0.2472 AU (37,000,000 km), or 96.3 lunar distance. Due to its eccentric orbit, Gordonmoore is also Mars-crosser. In 2127, the asteroid will pass the Red Planet within 0.02776 AU (4,150,000 km).

A first precovery was taken at the discovering Palomar Observatory in 1951, extending the body's observation arc by 39 years prior to its official discovery observation.

== Physical characteristics ==
=== Rotation period ===
In April 2016, a rotational lightcurve of Gordonmoore was obtained from photometric observations by astronomer Brian Warner at the Palmer Divide Station (716) in Colorado. It gave a rotation period of 8.40 hours with a brightness variation of 0.25 magnitude. Lightcurve analysis also gave an alternative period solution of 4.19 hours with an amplitude of 0.25 magnitude. (U=2). The results supersede a previous observations made at the Hoher List Observatory in Germany, that gave a shorter period of 6 hours (U=1).

=== Diameter and albedo ===
The Collaborative Asteroid Lightcurve Link assumes a standard albedo for stony asteroids of 0.20 and calculates a diameter of 1.04 kilometers with an absolute magnitude of 17.26. In the 1990s, Tom Gehrels estimated the body's diameter to be 2.3 kilometers, assuming an albedo of 0.15.

== Naming ==
This minor planet was named in honour of American entrepreneur and billionaire, Gordon Moore (1929–2023), co-founder of Intel, known for his revolutionary vision of the future of computers, and author of Moore's law. As a philanthropist, Moore has supported research and education all his life. The official naming citation was published by the Minor Planet Center on 26 May 2002 (M.P.C. 45747).
