= 9069 Hovland =

Asteroid

Discovery
- Discovered by: E. F. Helin
- Discovery site: Palomar Obs.
- Discovery date: 16 July 1993

Designations
- Named after: Larry E. Hovland (JPL engineer)
- Alternative designations: 1993 OV · 1991 XF_{5}
- Minor planet category: main-belt · Hungaria

Orbital characteristics
- Epoch 4 September 2017 (JD 2458000.5)
- Uncertainty parameter 0
- Observation arc: 25.51 yr (9,319 days)
- Aphelion: 2.1397 AU
- Perihelion: 1.6865 AU
- Semi-major axis: 1.9131 AU
- Eccentricity: 0.1185
- Orbital period (sidereal): 2.65 yr (966 days)
- Mean anomaly: 287.14°
- Mean motion: 0° 22^{m} 21^{s} / day
- Inclination: 19.574°
- Longitude of ascending node: 247.91°
- Argument of perihelion: 171.12°
- Known satellites: 1 (Note: Warner (2004e) web: rotation period 4.2174±0.0002 hours with a brightness amplitude of 0.08 mag. In 2004, Warner also reported it to be a binary system, yet no light-curve was published at the time. The orbital period of the secondary has been measured to amount to 30.35 hours. Summary figures at Collaborative Asteroid Lightcurve Link (CALL) for (9069) Hovland)

Physical characteristics
- Dimensions: 2.9±0.4 km 3.51 km (calculated)
- Synodic rotation period: 4.2158±0.0001 h 4.217 h 4.2173±0.0001 h 4.2174±0.0007 h
- Geometric albedo: 0.3 (assumed); 0.373±0.089
- Spectral type: E
- Absolute magnitude (H): 14.2 · 14.40±0.03

9069 Hovland, provisional designation 1993 OV, is a stony binary Hungaria asteroid from the inner regions of the asteroid belt, approximately 3 kilometers in diameter.

It was discovered on 16 July 1993, by American astronomer Eleanor Helin at the Palomar Observatory in California, United States, and later named for American JPL engineer Larry Hovland.

== Orbit and classification ==
The bright E-type asteroid is a member of the Hungaria family, which form the innermost dense concentration of asteroids in the Solar System. Hovland orbits the Sun in the inner main-belt at a distance of 1.7–2.1 AU once every 2 years and 8 months (966 days). Its orbit has an eccentricity of 0.12 and an inclination of 20° with respect to the ecliptic.

First identified as 1991 XF_{5} at ESO's La Silla site in December 1991, the asteroid's observation arc begins 19 months prior to its official discovery at Palomar.

== Rotation period ==
Several rotational lightcurves of Hovland were obtained from photometric observations. These lightcurves gave a well-defined rotation period of 4.216 to 4.217 hours and a low brightness variation between 0.008 and 0.011 in magnitude, indicating a nearly spheroidal shape (U=2/3/3/3/3).

== Diameter and albedo ==
According to the space-based Spitzer Space Telescope, Hovland has a high albedo of 0.373 and a diameter of 2.9 kilometers, while the Collaborative Asteroid Lightcurve Link assumes a standard albedo for members of the Hungaria family of 0.30, and calculates a diameter of 3.5 kilometers.

== Moon ==
In 2004, the U.S Palmer Divide Observatory, Colorado, reported the discovery of an asteroid moon making the asteroid a binary system. The moon's orbital period has since been measured to take 30.292, 30.34 and 30.35 hours, respectively, for a full orbit around its primary.

== Naming ==
This minor planet was named in honor of JPL engineer Larry E. Hovland (b. 1947), who oversees the electronics of the Raman spectrometer and the Mars 2005 optical navigation camera. He helped the discoverer to transition from photographic to electronic detection methods. The approved naming citation was published by the Minor Planet Center on 9 May 2001 (M.P.C. 42669).
