= 3988 Huma =

Near-Earth asteroid

Discovery
- Discovered by: E. F. Helin
- Discovery site: Palomar Obs.
- Discovery date: 4 June 1986

Designations
- Pronunciation: /ˈhuːmə/
- Named after: Huma bird (Persian mythology)
- Alternative designations: 1986 LA
- Minor planet category: Amor · NEO

Orbital characteristics
- Epoch 4 September 2017 (JD 2458000.5)
- Uncertainty parameter 0
- Observation arc: 29.61 yr (10,815 days)
- Aphelion: 2.0335 AU
- Perihelion: 1.0556 AU
- Semi-major axis: 1.5445 AU
- Eccentricity: 0.3166
- Orbital period (sidereal): 1.92 yr (701 days)
- Mean anomaly: 61.265°
- Mean motion: 0° 30^{m} 48.6^{s} / day
- Inclination: 10.768°
- Longitude of ascending node: 229.82°
- Argument of perihelion: 86.912°
- Earth MOID: 0.1781 AU · 69.4 LD

Physical characteristics
- Dimensions: 0.7 km 0.782 km (calculated)
- Synodic rotation period: 10.4±0.1 h (Note: Skiff (2011) web: rotation period 10.4±0.1 hours with a brightness amplitude of 0.24 mag. Skiff, B.A. (2011) Posting on CALL web site. Summary figures for (3988) Huma at Collaborative Asteroid Lightcurve Link (CALL))
- Geometric albedo: 0.20 (assumed)
- Spectral type: S
- Absolute magnitude (H): 17.9 · 17.97±0.15 · 18.17±0.29

3988 Huma, provisional designation 1986 LA, is an eccentric sub-kilometer asteroid and near-Earth object of the Amor group. It was discovered on 4 June 1986, by American astronomer Eleanor Helin at Palomar Observatory, California. The asteroid measures approximately 700 to 800 meters in diameter and was named after the Huma bird from Iranian mythology.

== Orbit and classification ==
Huma is a stony S-type asteroid that orbits the Sun in the inner main-belt at a distance of 1.1–2.0 AU once every 1 years and 11 months (701 days). Its orbit has an eccentricity of 0.32 and an inclination of 11° with respect to the ecliptic. As no precoveries were taken, the body's observation arc begins with its discovery observation at Palomar in 1986.

It has an Earth minimum orbit intersection distance of 0.1781 AU (26,600,000 km), which corresponds to 69.4 lunar distances.

== Physical characteristics ==
=== Rotation period ===
A rotational lightcurve of Huma was obtained by American astronomer Brian A. Skiff in July 2011. It gave a rotation period of 10.4±0.1 hours with a brightness variation of 0.24 magnitude (U=2+).

=== Diameter and albedo ===
In the 1990s, Dutch–American astronomer Tom Gehrels estimated Huma to measure 0.7 kilometers in diameter, based on an assumed medium albedo of 0.15. More recently, the Collaborative Asteroid Lightcurve Link assumed a standard albedo for stony asteroids of 0.20 and calculated a diameter of 0.78 kilometers.

== Naming ==
This minor planet was named after the Huma bird from Persian mythology and Sufi poetry. The mythological bird never alights on the ground, and its appearance in the sky is said to be a sign of fortune. The asteroid's name was suggested by the SGAC Name An Asteroid Campaign and its citation was published on 9 September 2014 (M.P.C. 89832).
