= L-type asteroid =

Relatively uncommon asteroids

L-type asteroids are relatively uncommon asteroids with a strongly reddish spectrum shortwards of 0.75 μm, and a featureless flat spectrum longwards of this. In comparison with the K-type, they exhibit a more reddish spectrum at visible wavelengths and a flat spectrum in the infrared.

These asteroids were described as "featureless" S-types in the Tholen classification. The L-type was formally introduced in the SMASS classification, although previous studies had noted the unusual spectra of two of its members 387 Aquitania and 980 Anacostia.

There are 41 asteroids classified as L-types in the SMASS taxonomy.

== Ld-type asteroids ==
The Ld type is a grouping proposed in the SMASS classification for asteroids with an L-like flat spectrum longwards of 0.75 μm, but even redder in visible wavelengths, like the D-type. An example may be 728 Leonisis, although it has also been classified as an A-type.

== See also ==
- Asteroid spectral types
