= (17511) 1992 QN =

Apollo asteroid

Discovery
- Discovered by: Eleanor Helin and Jeff Alu
- Discovery site: Palomar Observatory
- Discovery date: 29 August 1992

Designations
- Minor planet category: Apollo

Orbital characteristics
- Epoch 31 May 2020 (JD 2459000.5)
- Uncertainty parameter 0
- Observation arc: 9656 days (26.44 yr)
- Aphelion: 1.61699 AU (241.898 Gm)
- Perihelion: 0.76297 AU (114.139 Gm)
- Semi-major axis: 1.18998 AU (178.018 Gm)
- Eccentricity: 0.35884
- Orbital period (sidereal): 1.3 yr (474.14 d)
- Average orbital speed: 27.3 km/s
- Mean anomaly: 235.804°
- Mean motion: 0° 45^{m} 33.365^{s} / day
- Inclination: 9.58265°
- Longitude of ascending node: 355.924°
- Argument of perihelion: 202.359°
- Earth MOID: 0.132266 AU (19.7867 Gm)

Physical characteristics
- Synodic rotation period: 6 h (0.25 d)
- Spectral type: X
- Absolute magnitude (H): 17.3

(17511) 1992 QN is a small, bright Apollo asteroid discovered on 29 August 1992 by American astronomers Eleanor Helin and Jeff Alu at the Palomar Observatory, California, United States. It is a near-Earth asteroid whose orbit crosses that of Mars and Earth (a Mars and Earth-crossing asteroid). On 18 January 1996, it passed Earth at a distance of 0.158848 AU (23.763 million km), and on 12 July 2027, it will pass our planet again at a distance of 0.161858 AU (24.214 million km). (17511) 1992 QN's orbit is similar to that of Apollo asteroid 2010 JG.
