= (6037) 1988 EG =

Near-Earth asteroid

Discovery
- Discovered by: J. Alu
- Discovery site: Palomar Obs.
- Discovery date: 12 March 1988

Designations
- Minor planet category: Apollo · NEO · PHA

Orbital characteristics
- Epoch 4 September 2017 (JD 2458000.5)
- Uncertainty parameter 0
- Observation arc: 28.24 yr (10,315 days)
- Aphelion: 1.9064 AU
- Perihelion: 0.6359 AU
- Semi-major axis: 1.2711 AU
- Eccentricity: 0.4997
- Orbital period (sidereal): 1.43 yr (523 days)
- Mean anomaly: 261.93°
- Mean motion: 0° 41^{m} 15.72^{s} / day
- Inclination: 3.4998°
- Longitude of ascending node: 182.48°
- Argument of perihelion: 242.07°
- Earth MOID: 0.0243 AU · 9.5 LD

Physical characteristics
- Mean diameter: 0.399±0.027 km 0.54 km (derived)
- Synodic rotation period: 2.760±0.002 h (Note: Pravec (1998) web: rotation period 2.760±0.002 hours with a brightness amplitude of 0.20 mag. Summary figures at Collaborative Asteroid Lightcurve Link (CALL) for (6037) and Pravec, P.; Wolf, M.; Sarounova, L. (1998))
- Geometric albedo: 0.20 (assumed); 0.37±0.05
- Spectral type: S
- Absolute magnitude (H): 18.7 · 19.18±0.20

(6037) 1988 EG is an eccentric, stony asteroid, classified as a near-Earth object and potentially hazardous asteroid. It belongs to the group of Apollo asteroids and measures approximately half a kilometer in diameter. It was discovered by American astronomer Jeff T. Alu at the U.S. Palomar Observatory, California, on 12 March 1988.

== Classification and orbit ==
An S-type asteroid, 1988 EG orbits the Sun at a distance of 0.6–1.9 AU once every 1 years and 5 months (523 days). Its orbit has an eccentricity of 0.50 and an inclination of 3° with respect to the ecliptic.

The asteroid has an Earth minimum orbit intersection distance (MOID) of 0.0243 AU (3,600,000 km). In combination with its size, this makes it a potentially hazardous asteroid. A PHA requires a MOID with Earth of less than 0.05 AU, which is about 19.5 times the distance to the Moon, and a diameter of at least 150 meters. On 27 February 2041, it will pass 0.02437 AU (3,646,000 km) from Earth. It also makes close approaches to Mars and Venus.

== Physical characteristics ==
=== Lightcurve ===
An ambiguous lightcurve was obtained through photometric observations by Czech astronomer Petr Pravec in 1998. The light-curve gave a rotation period of 2.760±0.002 hours with a brightness amplitude of 0.20 in magnitude. The alternative period solution is 2.919±0.22 hours with an amplitude of 0.22 in magnitude (U=2).

=== Diameter and albedo ===
The Collaborative Asteroid Lightcurve Link (CALL) assumes a standard albedo for stony asteroids of 0.20 and calculates a diameter of 540 meters, based on an absolute magnitude of 18.7. Observations with the Spitzer Space Telescope using its Infrared Array Camera at wavelengths between 3.6 and 8.0 micrometers, gave an average diameter of 399 meters with a higher albedo of 0.37.
