= List of minor planets: 514001–515000 =

The following is a partial list of minor planets, running from minor-planet number 514001 through 515000, inclusive. The primary data for this and other partial lists is based on JPL's "Small-Body Orbital Elements" and data available from the Minor Planet Center. Critical list information is also provided by the MPC, unless otherwise specified from Lowell Observatory. A detailed description of the table's columns and additional sources are given on the main page including a complete list of every page in this series, and a statistical break-up on the dynamical classification of minor planets.

Also see the summary list of all named bodies in numerical and alphabetical order, and the corresponding naming citations for the number range of this particular list. New namings may only be added to this list after official publication, as the preannouncement of names is condemned by the Working Group for Small Bodies Nomenclature of the International Astronomical Union.

Near-Earth obj.	MBA (inner)	MBA (outer)	Centaur
Mars-crosser	MBA (middle)	Jupiter trojan	Trans-Neptunian obj.
Unclassified

== 514001–514100 ==
Designation			Discovery			Properties		Ref
Permanent	Provisional	Named after	Date	Site	Discoverer(s)	Category	Diam.	Ref
514001	2014 HB_{159}	—	February 27, 2014	Mount Lemmon	Mount Lemmon Survey	·	1.8 km	MPC · JPL
514002	2014 HJ_{172}	—	January 10, 2013	Haleakala	Pan-STARRS 1	·	1.8 km	MPC · JPL
514003	2014 HV_{179}	—	May 23, 2006	Mount Lemmon	Mount Lemmon Survey	·	960 m	MPC · JPL
514004	2014 JC_{10}	—	March 3, 2009	Mount Lemmon	Mount Lemmon Survey	NEM	1.7 km	MPC · JPL
514005	2014 JF_{11}	—	May 3, 2014	Mount Lemmon	Mount Lemmon Survey	·	1.7 km	MPC · JPL
514006	2014 JG_{18}	—	April 24, 2014	Haleakala	Pan-STARRS 1	·	1.8 km	MPC · JPL
514007	2014 JR_{47}	—	February 28, 2008	Mount Lemmon	Mount Lemmon Survey	·	1.4 km	MPC · JPL
514008	2014 JE_{48}	—	May 5, 2014	Mount Lemmon	Mount Lemmon Survey	·	3.2 km	MPC · JPL
514009	2014 JK_{55}	—	May 9, 2014	Mount Lemmon	Mount Lemmon Survey	·	1.8 km	MPC · JPL
514010	2014 JB_{59}	—	December 3, 2008	Kitt Peak	Spacewatch	·	1.3 km	MPC · JPL
514011	2014 JZ_{59}	—	April 24, 2014	Kitt Peak	Spacewatch	EOS	1.7 km	MPC · JPL
514012	2014 JW_{62}	—	March 4, 1997	Kitt Peak	Spacewatch	·	1.1 km	MPC · JPL
514013	2014 JA_{79}	—	July 18, 2006	Siding Spring	SSS	BAR	1.5 km	MPC · JPL
514014	2014 JG_{84}	—	January 25, 2009	Kitt Peak	Spacewatch	·	1.6 km	MPC · JPL
514015	2014 JL_{84}	—	May 10, 2014	Haleakala	Pan-STARRS 1	AEO	1.2 km	MPC · JPL
514016	2014 JT_{84}	—	February 10, 2007	Mount Lemmon	Mount Lemmon Survey	EOS	1.9 km	MPC · JPL
514017	2014 JU_{84}	—	May 6, 2014	Haleakala	Pan-STARRS 1	·	2.3 km	MPC · JPL
514018	2014 JZ_{84}	—	February 10, 2007	Mount Lemmon	Mount Lemmon Survey	EOS	1.7 km	MPC · JPL
514019	2014 JP_{85}	—	April 18, 2009	Mount Lemmon	Mount Lemmon Survey	·	2.0 km	MPC · JPL
514020	2014 JS_{85}	—	June 27, 2010	WISE	WISE	URS	4.5 km	MPC · JPL
514021	2014 JD_{86}	—	February 3, 2008	Kitt Peak	Spacewatch	·	2.0 km	MPC · JPL
514022	2014 KP_{7}	—	April 5, 2014	Haleakala	Pan-STARRS 1	·	1.3 km	MPC · JPL
514023	2014 KS_{22}	—	October 26, 2011	Haleakala	Pan-STARRS 1	EUN	1.3 km	MPC · JPL
514024	2014 KU_{22}	—	December 21, 2008	Mount Lemmon	Mount Lemmon Survey	EUN	1.1 km	MPC · JPL
514025	2014 KK_{26}	—	April 4, 2008	Mount Lemmon	Mount Lemmon Survey	VER	2.7 km	MPC · JPL
514026	2014 KE_{34}	—	February 3, 2009	Kitt Peak	Spacewatch	·	1.5 km	MPC · JPL
514027	2014 KR_{42}	—	February 28, 2014	Haleakala	Pan-STARRS 1	·	2.9 km	MPC · JPL
514028	2014 KH_{53}	—	May 9, 2005	Kitt Peak	Spacewatch	·	1.2 km	MPC · JPL
514029	2014 KF_{68}	—	October 24, 2011	Mount Lemmon	Mount Lemmon Survey	TEL	1.2 km	MPC · JPL
514030	2014 KL_{72}	—	October 26, 2011	Haleakala	Pan-STARRS 1	TRE	2.3 km	MPC · JPL
514031	2014 KY_{75}	—	March 25, 2006	Siding Spring	SSS	·	1.8 km	MPC · JPL
514032	2014 KD_{93}	—	May 6, 2014	Haleakala	Pan-STARRS 1	·	1.9 km	MPC · JPL
514033	2014 KQ_{96}	—	March 1, 2009	Kitt Peak	Spacewatch	MRX	880 m	MPC · JPL
514034	2014 KN_{104}	—	December 21, 2006	Mount Lemmon	Mount Lemmon Survey	·	3.6 km	MPC · JPL
514035	2014 LT_{17}	—	April 2, 2009	Mount Lemmon	Mount Lemmon Survey	GEF	1.1 km	MPC · JPL
514036	2014 LO_{22}	—	October 30, 2010	Mount Lemmon	Mount Lemmon Survey	·	2.7 km	MPC · JPL
514037	2014 LH_{29}	—	February 17, 2013	Kitt Peak	Spacewatch	·	2.0 km	MPC · JPL
514038	2014 ME_{13}	—	September 14, 2009	Catalina	CSS	·	2.9 km	MPC · JPL
514039	2014 MZ_{14}	—	February 1, 2012	Mount Lemmon	Mount Lemmon Survey	·	3.0 km	MPC · JPL
514040	2014 MQ_{17}	—	February 14, 2009	Mount Lemmon	Mount Lemmon Survey	·	1.8 km	MPC · JPL
514041	2014 MQ_{18}	—	March 25, 2009	Siding Spring	SSS	T_{j} (2.77) · AMO +1km	5.3 km	MPC · JPL
514042	2014 ME_{26}	—	June 25, 2014	Mount Lemmon	Mount Lemmon Survey	·	2.8 km	MPC · JPL
514043	2014 ME_{35}	—	June 18, 2014	Haleakala	Pan-STARRS 1	EOS	2.4 km	MPC · JPL
514044	2014 MM_{50}	—	May 25, 2014	Haleakala	Pan-STARRS 1	H	550 m	MPC · JPL
514045	2014 ML_{52}	—	May 28, 2008	Mount Lemmon	Mount Lemmon Survey	·	3.3 km	MPC · JPL
514046	2014 ML_{63}	—	May 17, 2010	WISE	WISE	·	1.9 km	MPC · JPL
514047	2014 NM_{24}	—	November 1, 2010	Mount Lemmon	Mount Lemmon Survey	·	3.2 km	MPC · JPL
514048	2014 ON_{37}	—	January 10, 2007	Mount Lemmon	Mount Lemmon Survey	TIR	2.6 km	MPC · JPL
514049	2014 OK_{70}	—	March 8, 2013	Haleakala	Pan-STARRS 1	·	2.3 km	MPC · JPL
514050	2014 OK_{104}	—	June 5, 2014	Haleakala	Pan-STARRS 1	·	3.1 km	MPC · JPL
514051	2014 OE_{111}	—	June 4, 2014	Haleakala	Pan-STARRS 1	ELF	3.4 km	MPC · JPL
514052	2014 OC_{119}	—	April 12, 2013	Haleakala	Pan-STARRS 1	·	3.0 km	MPC · JPL
514053	2014 OM_{129}	—	May 7, 2014	Haleakala	Pan-STARRS 1	EOS	1.6 km	MPC · JPL
514054	2014 OH_{135}	—	September 12, 2004	Kitt Peak	Spacewatch	·	1.9 km	MPC · JPL
514055	2014 OR_{185}	—	June 28, 2014	Haleakala	Pan-STARRS 1	·	3.0 km	MPC · JPL
514056	2014 OQ_{208}	—	March 9, 2007	Mount Lemmon	Mount Lemmon Survey	THM	2.0 km	MPC · JPL
514057	2014 OZ_{212}	—	June 26, 2014	Haleakala	Pan-STARRS 1	·	3.3 km	MPC · JPL
514058	2014 OL_{298}	—	September 13, 2004	Socorro	LINEAR	H	480 m	MPC · JPL
514059	2014 OZ_{352}	—	January 17, 2007	Kitt Peak	Spacewatch	·	3.0 km	MPC · JPL
514060	2014 OX_{375}	—	July 3, 2014	Haleakala	Pan-STARRS 1	·	2.6 km	MPC · JPL
514061	2014 OM_{382}	—	January 26, 2012	Haleakala	Pan-STARRS 1	URS	2.8 km	MPC · JPL
514062	2014 OT_{394}	—	December 5, 2015	Haleakala	Pan-STARRS 1	L5	8.1 km	MPC · JPL
514063	2014 OF_{401}	—	May 12, 2013	Haleakala	Pan-STARRS 1	·	2.5 km	MPC · JPL
514064	2014 PB_{2}	—	April 17, 2013	Haleakala	Pan-STARRS 1	·	2.9 km	MPC · JPL
514065	2014 PO_{6}	—	February 3, 2012	Haleakala	Pan-STARRS 1	·	3.5 km	MPC · JPL
514066	2014 PD_{39}	—	March 16, 2007	Catalina	CSS	·	3.0 km	MPC · JPL
514067	2014 PU_{65}	—	June 5, 2014	Haleakala	Pan-STARRS 1	·	2.4 km	MPC · JPL
514068	2014 QG_{41}	—	April 4, 2013	Siding Spring	SSS	·	3.2 km	MPC · JPL
514069	2014 QC_{172}	—	January 26, 2012	Haleakala	Pan-STARRS 1	LIX	3.5 km	MPC · JPL
514070	2014 QZ_{199}	—	May 31, 2014	Mount Lemmon	Mount Lemmon Survey	·	3.2 km	MPC · JPL
514071	2014 QB_{264}	—	April 14, 2007	Catalina	CSS	EUP	3.1 km	MPC · JPL
514072	2014 QJ_{337}	—	May 1, 2008	Kitt Peak	Spacewatch	·	2.1 km	MPC · JPL
514073	2014 QS_{344}	—	February 1, 2006	Kitt Peak	Spacewatch	·	2.5 km	MPC · JPL
514074	2014 QO_{388}	—	September 10, 2004	Socorro	LINEAR	H	420 m	MPC · JPL
514075	2014 QL_{421}	—	June 24, 2014	Haleakala	Pan-STARRS 1	·	3.5 km	MPC · JPL
514076	2014 RT_{12}	—	September 4, 2014	Haleakala	Pan-STARRS 1	H	650 m	MPC · JPL
514077	2014 RD_{18}	—	November 7, 2007	Mount Lemmon	Mount Lemmon Survey	H	620 m	MPC · JPL
514078	2014 SP_{349}	—	May 16, 2009	Mount Lemmon	Mount Lemmon Survey	L5	8.9 km	MPC · JPL
514079	2014 SD_{351}	—	March 11, 2005	Mount Lemmon	Mount Lemmon Survey	L5	9.7 km	MPC · JPL
514080	2014 TP_{86}	—	September 27, 2011	Mount Lemmon	Mount Lemmon Survey	H	470 m	MPC · JPL
514081	2014 UN_{56}	—	March 31, 2008	Catalina	CSS	H	510 m	MPC · JPL
514082	2014 UG_{98}	—	September 13, 2012	Mount Lemmon	Mount Lemmon Survey	L5	7.6 km	MPC · JPL
514083	2014 UL_{160}	—	July 25, 2011	Haleakala	Pan-STARRS 1	L5	8.6 km	MPC · JPL
514084	2014 UR_{225}	—	March 11, 2008	Mount Lemmon	Mount Lemmon Survey	L5	7.7 km	MPC · JPL
514085	2014 VO	—	July 29, 2006	Siding Spring	SSS	H	520 m	MPC · JPL
514086	2014 VB_{2}	—	August 3, 2011	Haleakala	Pan-STARRS 1	H	490 m	MPC · JPL
514087	2014 VC_{2}	—	September 20, 2014	Haleakala	Pan-STARRS 1	H	450 m	MPC · JPL
514088	2014 VE_{10}	—	August 28, 2011	Haleakala	Pan-STARRS 1	H	520 m	MPC · JPL
514089	2014 WS_{137}	—	May 4, 2009	Mount Lemmon	Mount Lemmon Survey	L5	9.0 km	MPC · JPL
514090	2014 WL_{355}	—	April 14, 2005	Kitt Peak	Spacewatch	·	3.8 km	MPC · JPL
514091	2014 WL_{370}	—	November 20, 2014	Haleakala	Pan-STARRS 1	H	450 m	MPC · JPL
514092	2014 WF_{371}	—	August 28, 2006	Catalina	CSS	H	370 m	MPC · JPL
514093	2014 WD_{492}	—	May 7, 2005	Mount Lemmon	Mount Lemmon Survey	PHO	1.0 km	MPC · JPL
514094	2014 WY_{510}	—	November 16, 2014	Mount Lemmon	Mount Lemmon Survey	H	560 m	MPC · JPL
514095	2014 WF_{511}	—	April 7, 2008	Mount Lemmon	Mount Lemmon Survey	L5	10 km	MPC · JPL
514096	2014 WQ_{511}	—	September 23, 2008	Kitt Peak	Spacewatch	H	460 m	MPC · JPL
514097	2014 XW_{20}	—	June 26, 2011	Mount Lemmon	Mount Lemmon Survey	L5	8.5 km	MPC · JPL
514098	2014 XE_{33}	—	April 10, 2008	Kitt Peak	Spacewatch	L5	10 km	MPC · JPL
514099	2014 XL_{40}	—	April 15, 2008	Mount Lemmon	Mount Lemmon Survey	L5	7.4 km	MPC · JPL
514100	2014 YY_{54}	—	February 27, 2006	Catalina	CSS	·	2.4 km	MPC · JPL

== 514101–514200 ==
back to top

Designation			Discovery			Properties		Ref
Permanent	Provisional	Named after	Date	Site	Discoverer(s)	Category	Diam.	Ref
514101	2015 AO_{1}	—	August 2, 2005	Siding Spring	SSS	H	700 m	MPC · JPL
514102	2015 AT_{44}	—	October 9, 2008	Catalina	CSS	·	1.0 km	MPC · JPL
514103	2015 AO_{281}	—	January 11, 2015	Haleakala	Pan-STARRS 1	H	400 m	MPC · JPL
514104	2015 AA_{282}	—	February 17, 2007	Kitt Peak	Spacewatch	H	520 m	MPC · JPL
514105	2015 BT_{92}	—	September 13, 2007	Catalina	CSS	·	420 m	MPC · JPL
514106	2015 BG_{301}	—	October 17, 2003	Kitt Peak	Spacewatch	·	750 m	MPC · JPL
514107 Kaʻepaokaʻāwela	2015 BZ_{509}	Kaʻepaokaʻāwela	January 16, 2015	Haleakala	Pan-STARRS 1	critical	2.8 km	MPC · JPL
514108	2015 BJ_{541}	—	April 7, 2010	Kitt Peak	Spacewatch	EOS	1.9 km	MPC · JPL
514109	2015 CD	—	March 16, 2005	Catalina	CSS	H	580 m	MPC · JPL
514110	2015 CU_{54}	—	January 23, 2015	Haleakala	Pan-STARRS 1	·	440 m	MPC · JPL
514111	2015 DX_{98}	—	August 19, 2009	La Sagra	OAM	·	690 m	MPC · JPL
514112	2015 DJ_{165}	—	March 10, 2005	Mount Lemmon	Mount Lemmon Survey	·	640 m	MPC · JPL
514113	2015 DA_{168}	—	January 14, 2008	Kitt Peak	Spacewatch	·	630 m	MPC · JPL
514114	2015 DF_{205}	—	January 25, 2015	Haleakala	Pan-STARRS 1	·	770 m	MPC · JPL
514115	2015 DV_{230}	—	April 30, 2008	Mount Lemmon	Mount Lemmon Survey	·	880 m	MPC · JPL
514116	2015 EB_{75}	—	March 11, 2011	Mount Lemmon	Mount Lemmon Survey	·	1.4 km	MPC · JPL
514117	2015 FH_{105}	—	October 17, 2010	Mount Lemmon	Mount Lemmon Survey	·	560 m	MPC · JPL
514118	2015 FL_{141}	—	March 28, 2012	Mount Lemmon	Mount Lemmon Survey	·	700 m	MPC · JPL
514119	2015 FR_{173}	—	March 3, 2008	Mount Lemmon	Mount Lemmon Survey	·	530 m	MPC · JPL
514120	2015 FL_{175}	—	November 26, 2009	Mount Lemmon	Mount Lemmon Survey	·	1.2 km	MPC · JPL
514121	2015 FJ_{249}	—	March 12, 2008	Kitt Peak	Spacewatch	·	840 m	MPC · JPL
514122	2015 FQ_{331}	—	September 14, 2005	Catalina	CSS	·	1.4 km	MPC · JPL
514123	2015 FW_{338}	—	September 14, 2007	Catalina	CSS	·	1.4 km	MPC · JPL
514124	2015 FS_{343}	—	September 17, 2009	Kitt Peak	Spacewatch	·	1.3 km	MPC · JPL
514125	2015 FO_{402}	—	April 6, 2011	Mount Lemmon	Mount Lemmon Survey	V	610 m	MPC · JPL
514126	2015 FR_{403}	—	October 20, 2012	Haleakala	Pan-STARRS 1	·	1.1 km	MPC · JPL
514127	2015 GD_{18}	—	April 12, 2002	Socorro	LINEAR	·	520 m	MPC · JPL
514128	2015 GB_{29}	—	March 12, 2008	Kitt Peak	Spacewatch	·	870 m	MPC · JPL
514129	2015 GX_{30}	—	May 4, 2005	Mount Lemmon	Mount Lemmon Survey	·	560 m	MPC · JPL
514130	2015 GY_{39}	—	May 21, 2012	Haleakala	Pan-STARRS 1	·	650 m	MPC · JPL
514131	2015 HY_{27}	—	March 11, 2005	Kitt Peak	Spacewatch	·	600 m	MPC · JPL
514132	2015 HS_{110}	—	April 30, 2011	Haleakala	Pan-STARRS 1	EUN	1.3 km	MPC · JPL
514133	2015 HY_{133}	—	November 26, 2013	Haleakala	Pan-STARRS 1	·	900 m	MPC · JPL
514134	2015 HL_{134}	—	November 8, 2013	Mount Lemmon	Mount Lemmon Survey	·	700 m	MPC · JPL
514135	2015 HS_{152}	—	November 3, 2005	Mount Lemmon	Mount Lemmon Survey	NYS	1.0 km	MPC · JPL
514136	2015 HX_{152}	—	April 23, 2015	Haleakala	Pan-STARRS 1	·	750 m	MPC · JPL
514137	2015 HQ_{153}	—	April 23, 2015	Haleakala	Pan-STARRS 1	V	450 m	MPC · JPL
514138	2015 HW_{173}	—	September 27, 2006	Kitt Peak	Spacewatch	·	740 m	MPC · JPL
514139	2015 HO_{175}	—	December 3, 2007	Kitt Peak	Spacewatch	·	610 m	MPC · JPL
514140	2015 HM_{176}	—	March 27, 2004	Kitt Peak	Spacewatch	·	980 m	MPC · JPL
514141	2015 HL_{186}	—	January 27, 2007	Mount Lemmon	Mount Lemmon Survey	V	510 m	MPC · JPL
514142	2015 HK_{187}	—	December 29, 2008	Mount Lemmon	Mount Lemmon Survey	·	1.5 km	MPC · JPL
514143	2015 JK_{2}	—	March 19, 2004	Socorro	LINEAR	·	950 m	MPC · JPL
514144	2015 JV_{13}	—	March 13, 2011	Kitt Peak	Spacewatch	·	1.1 km	MPC · JPL
514145	2015 KO_{26}	—	April 9, 2005	Mount Lemmon	Mount Lemmon Survey	·	570 m	MPC · JPL
514146	2015 KD_{42}	—	March 6, 2011	Mount Lemmon	Mount Lemmon Survey	MAS	570 m	MPC · JPL
514147	2015 KN_{42}	—	October 16, 2009	Mount Lemmon	Mount Lemmon Survey	·	870 m	MPC · JPL
514148	2015 KL_{43}	—	November 9, 2009	Kitt Peak	Spacewatch	·	1.2 km	MPC · JPL
514149	2015 KN_{52}	—	November 5, 1999	Kitt Peak	Spacewatch	·	820 m	MPC · JPL
514150	2015 KJ_{57}	—	May 18, 2015	Haleakala	Pan-STARRS 1	APO · PHA	180 m	MPC · JPL
514151	2015 KA_{92}	—	April 23, 2015	Haleakala	Pan-STARRS 1	V	590 m	MPC · JPL
514152	2015 KQ_{94}	—	March 23, 2004	Kitt Peak	Spacewatch	·	780 m	MPC · JPL
514153	2015 KD_{116}	—	March 5, 2011	Mount Lemmon	Mount Lemmon Survey	·	1.0 km	MPC · JPL
514154	2015 KW_{125}	—	October 24, 2005	Kitt Peak	Spacewatch	·	1.3 km	MPC · JPL
514155	2015 KQ_{137}	—	February 8, 2011	Mount Lemmon	Mount Lemmon Survey	NYS	710 m	MPC · JPL
514156	2015 KA_{152}	—	February 10, 2011	Mount Lemmon	Mount Lemmon Survey	NYS	680 m	MPC · JPL
514157	2015 KH_{165}	—	March 1, 2009	Mount Lemmon	Mount Lemmon Survey	·	1.7 km	MPC · JPL
514158	2015 KM_{165}	—	May 21, 2015	Haleakala	Pan-STARRS 1	·	1.1 km	MPC · JPL
514159	2015 KF_{166}	—	April 8, 2008	Kitt Peak	Spacewatch	·	810 m	MPC · JPL
514160	2015 LH_{16}	—	September 22, 2003	Palomar	NEAT	EUN	1.4 km	MPC · JPL
514161	2015 LM_{30}	—	February 26, 2014	Haleakala	Pan-STARRS 1	·	1.8 km	MPC · JPL
514162	2015 LA_{37}	—	February 12, 2011	Mount Lemmon	Mount Lemmon Survey	·	800 m	MPC · JPL
514163	2015 LD_{38}	—	February 12, 2008	Mount Lemmon	Mount Lemmon Survey	·	700 m	MPC · JPL
514164	2015 LV_{41}	—	February 20, 2009	Kitt Peak	Spacewatch	·	1.6 km	MPC · JPL
514165	2015 LM_{42}	—	October 7, 2007	Mount Lemmon	Mount Lemmon Survey	·	1.6 km	MPC · JPL
514166	2015 MV_{6}	—	April 15, 2011	Haleakala	Pan-STARRS 1	·	1.0 km	MPC · JPL
514167	2015 MY_{7}	—	February 10, 1999	Kitt Peak	Spacewatch	·	880 m	MPC · JPL
514168	2015 MY_{9}	—	October 17, 2007	Mount Lemmon	Mount Lemmon Survey	WIT	780 m	MPC · JPL
514169	2015 MU_{15}	—	October 20, 2007	Mount Lemmon	Mount Lemmon Survey	·	1.9 km	MPC · JPL
514170	2015 MT_{16}	—	May 30, 2012	Mount Lemmon	Mount Lemmon Survey	·	760 m	MPC · JPL
514171	2015 MZ_{17}	—	February 14, 2005	Kitt Peak	Spacewatch	·	570 m	MPC · JPL
514172	2015 MG_{29}	—	March 27, 2008	Mount Lemmon	Mount Lemmon Survey	·	460 m	MPC · JPL
514173	2015 MA_{31}	—	October 8, 2012	Haleakala	Pan-STARRS 1	·	910 m	MPC · JPL
514174	2015 MS_{46}	—	March 7, 2014	Kitt Peak	Spacewatch	·	1.7 km	MPC · JPL
514175	2015 MK_{47}	—	October 28, 2008	Mount Lemmon	Mount Lemmon Survey	NYS	1.1 km	MPC · JPL
514176	2015 MN_{49}	—	April 12, 2010	Mount Lemmon	Mount Lemmon Survey	·	1.2 km	MPC · JPL
514177	2015 MC_{52}	—	September 9, 2008	Mount Lemmon	Mount Lemmon Survey	·	1.0 km	MPC · JPL
514178	2015 MM_{54}	—	March 26, 2011	Mount Lemmon	Mount Lemmon Survey	·	960 m	MPC · JPL
514179	2015 MX_{57}	—	October 17, 2012	Mount Lemmon	Mount Lemmon Survey	·	1.4 km	MPC · JPL
514180	2015 MC_{59}	—	October 31, 2005	Kitt Peak	Spacewatch	·	1.0 km	MPC · JPL
514181	2015 MK_{61}	—	March 13, 2011	Kitt Peak	Spacewatch	·	860 m	MPC · JPL
514182	2015 MT_{76}	—	January 7, 2014	Kitt Peak	Spacewatch	·	1.1 km	MPC · JPL
514183	2015 MC_{77}	—	June 18, 2015	Haleakala	Pan-STARRS 1	·	2.5 km	MPC · JPL
514184	2015 MX_{78}	—	January 1, 2009	Kitt Peak	Spacewatch	·	1.5 km	MPC · JPL
514185	2015 MN_{79}	—	December 4, 2007	Mount Lemmon	Mount Lemmon Survey	PAD	1.4 km	MPC · JPL
514186	2015 MQ_{79}	—	October 20, 2007	Mount Lemmon	Mount Lemmon Survey	WIT	810 m	MPC · JPL
514187	2015 ML_{81}	—	July 28, 2011	Haleakala	Pan-STARRS 1	·	990 m	MPC · JPL
514188	2015 MO_{85}	—	January 10, 2007	Mount Lemmon	Mount Lemmon Survey	·	2.1 km	MPC · JPL
514189	2015 MX_{96}	—	December 23, 2012	Haleakala	Pan-STARRS 1	·	1.7 km	MPC · JPL
514190	2015 MM_{98}	—	January 18, 2009	Kitt Peak	Spacewatch	·	1.8 km	MPC · JPL
514191	2015 MX_{98}	—	September 23, 2011	Haleakala	Pan-STARRS 1	·	1.6 km	MPC · JPL
514192	2015 MO_{101}	—	May 23, 2011	Mount Lemmon	Mount Lemmon Survey	·	1.3 km	MPC · JPL
514193	2015 MN_{105}	—	January 25, 2006	Kitt Peak	Spacewatch	·	1.5 km	MPC · JPL
514194	2015 MJ_{108}	—	October 19, 2011	Haleakala	Pan-STARRS 1	·	2.2 km	MPC · JPL
514195	2015 MV_{110}	—	April 6, 1999	Kitt Peak	Spacewatch	MAS	740 m	MPC · JPL
514196	2015 MD_{111}	—	February 27, 2014	Kitt Peak	Spacewatch	·	1.3 km	MPC · JPL
514197	2015 MH_{111}	—	May 11, 2007	Mount Lemmon	Mount Lemmon Survey	MAS	810 m	MPC · JPL
514198	2015 MW_{114}	—	April 4, 2014	Haleakala	Pan-STARRS 1	·	1.9 km	MPC · JPL
514199	2015 ML_{118}	—	March 9, 2007	Catalina	CSS	·	1.2 km	MPC · JPL
514200	2015 ML_{133}	—	February 16, 2010	Mount Lemmon	Mount Lemmon Survey	·	890 m	MPC · JPL

== 514201–514300 ==
back to top

Designation			Discovery			Properties		Ref
Permanent	Provisional	Named after	Date	Site	Discoverer(s)	Category	Diam.	Ref
514201	2015 MO_{134}	—	May 21, 2014	Haleakala	Pan-STARRS 1	·	2.5 km	MPC · JPL
514202	2015 MS_{135}	—	November 17, 2011	Kitt Peak	Spacewatch	·	1.8 km	MPC · JPL
514203	2015 MB_{136}	—	February 1, 2009	Kitt Peak	Spacewatch	·	1.6 km	MPC · JPL
514204	2015 MG_{136}	—	September 12, 2007	Mount Lemmon	Mount Lemmon Survey	·	1.4 km	MPC · JPL
514205	2015 MJ_{136}	—	November 18, 2007	Mount Lemmon	Mount Lemmon Survey	HOF	2.1 km	MPC · JPL
514206	2015 MK_{136}	—	December 30, 2008	Mount Lemmon	Mount Lemmon Survey	WIT	860 m	MPC · JPL
514207	2015 MA_{137}	—	April 5, 2014	Haleakala	Pan-STARRS 1	·	3.1 km	MPC · JPL
514208	2015 MH_{137}	—	March 23, 2014	Kitt Peak	Spacewatch	ADE	2.1 km	MPC · JPL
514209	2015 NN_{7}	—	September 3, 2010	Mount Lemmon	Mount Lemmon Survey	EOS	1.7 km	MPC · JPL
514210	2015 NU_{8}	—	December 23, 2000	Apache Point	SDSS	·	1.8 km	MPC · JPL
514211	2015 NJ_{16}	—	January 2, 2009	Mount Lemmon	Mount Lemmon Survey	·	2.9 km	MPC · JPL
514212	2015 NP_{23}	—	July 16, 2010	WISE	WISE	·	1.7 km	MPC · JPL
514213	2015 NN_{26}	—	September 26, 2006	Mount Lemmon	Mount Lemmon Survey	KOR	1.4 km	MPC · JPL
514214	2015 OU_{4}	—	February 11, 2014	Mount Lemmon	Mount Lemmon Survey	MAR	880 m	MPC · JPL
514215	2015 OE_{6}	—	November 26, 2011	Kitt Peak	Spacewatch	EOS	1.9 km	MPC · JPL
514216	2015 OB_{11}	—	April 25, 2010	Kitt Peak	Spacewatch	·	1.3 km	MPC · JPL
514217	2015 OT_{12}	—	April 5, 2014	Haleakala	Pan-STARRS 1	·	1.7 km	MPC · JPL
514218	2015 OU_{12}	—	April 9, 2010	Kitt Peak	Spacewatch	·	1.7 km	MPC · JPL
514219	2015 OH_{14}	—	January 18, 2012	Mount Lemmon	Mount Lemmon Survey	·	2.7 km	MPC · JPL
514220	2015 OK_{21}	—	June 20, 2015	Haleakala	Pan-STARRS 1	·	2.0 km	MPC · JPL
514221	2015 ON_{23}	—	February 26, 2014	Haleakala	Pan-STARRS 1	·	1.7 km	MPC · JPL
514222	2015 OA_{46}	—	August 23, 2011	Haleakala	Pan-STARRS 1	·	1.6 km	MPC · JPL
514223	2015 OE_{59}	—	October 19, 2000	Kitt Peak	Spacewatch	EOS	2.0 km	MPC · JPL
514224	2015 OC_{64}	—	September 25, 2011	Haleakala	Pan-STARRS 1	·	1.8 km	MPC · JPL
514225	2015 OE_{70}	—	August 24, 2011	Haleakala	Pan-STARRS 1	·	1.3 km	MPC · JPL
514226	2015 OE_{73}	—	February 15, 2010	Kitt Peak	Spacewatch	·	1.2 km	MPC · JPL
514227	2015 OV_{73}	—	April 21, 2006	Catalina	CSS	·	1.5 km	MPC · JPL
514228	2015 OO_{84}	—	January 11, 2008	Kitt Peak	Spacewatch	KOR	1.2 km	MPC · JPL
514229	2015 OF_{85}	—	December 5, 2007	Mount Lemmon	Mount Lemmon Survey	·	1.6 km	MPC · JPL
514230	2015 OJ_{85}	—	February 17, 2013	Kitt Peak	Spacewatch	KOR	1.4 km	MPC · JPL
514231	2015 OH_{86}	—	January 14, 2013	Mount Lemmon	Mount Lemmon Survey	·	2.0 km	MPC · JPL
514232	2015 OL_{86}	—	March 14, 2013	Kitt Peak	Spacewatch	·	2.9 km	MPC · JPL
514233	2015 OC_{87}	—	January 10, 2014	Mount Lemmon	Mount Lemmon Survey	·	2.2 km	MPC · JPL
514234	2015 OE_{87}	—	September 18, 2011	Mount Lemmon	Mount Lemmon Survey	RAF	790 m	MPC · JPL
514235	2015 OS_{87}	—	September 11, 2004	Kitt Peak	Spacewatch	·	2.8 km	MPC · JPL
514236	2015 OW_{87}	—	February 27, 2008	Mount Lemmon	Mount Lemmon Survey	·	2.1 km	MPC · JPL
514237	2015 OC_{88}	—	October 25, 2011	Haleakala	Pan-STARRS 1	·	1.6 km	MPC · JPL
514238	2015 OH_{88}	—	February 21, 2007	Mount Lemmon	Mount Lemmon Survey	·	3.0 km	MPC · JPL
514239	2015 OL_{88}	—	December 6, 2007	Mount Lemmon	Mount Lemmon Survey	·	1.8 km	MPC · JPL
514240	2015 OY_{88}	—	May 5, 2008	Kitt Peak	Spacewatch	·	3.5 km	MPC · JPL
514241	2015 PO_{2}	—	April 6, 2010	Mount Lemmon	Mount Lemmon Survey	·	1.7 km	MPC · JPL
514242	2015 PM_{3}	—	December 22, 2008	Kitt Peak	Spacewatch	·	1.3 km	MPC · JPL
514243	2015 PH_{8}	—	May 7, 2014	Haleakala	Pan-STARRS 1	·	2.5 km	MPC · JPL
514244	2015 PY_{30}	—	September 18, 2003	Kitt Peak	Spacewatch	·	1.1 km	MPC · JPL
514245	2015 PZ_{37}	—	February 1, 2005	Kitt Peak	Spacewatch	·	1.5 km	MPC · JPL
514246	2015 PC_{50}	—	October 31, 2010	Mount Lemmon	Mount Lemmon Survey	HYG	2.5 km	MPC · JPL
514247	2015 PD_{51}	—	September 14, 2007	Catalina	CSS	·	1.5 km	MPC · JPL
514248	2015 PP_{52}	—	May 29, 2010	WISE	WISE	·	1.8 km	MPC · JPL
514249	2015 PG_{62}	—	August 25, 2011	La Sagra	OAM	·	1.2 km	MPC · JPL
514250	2015 PH_{94}	—	September 26, 2011	Haleakala	Pan-STARRS 1	·	1.4 km	MPC · JPL
514251	2015 PK_{94}	—	July 27, 2015	Haleakala	Pan-STARRS 1	·	1.8 km	MPC · JPL
514252	2015 PX_{119}	—	February 2, 2005	Kitt Peak	Spacewatch	·	1.6 km	MPC · JPL
514253	2015 PO_{121}	—	June 30, 2015	Haleakala	Pan-STARRS 1	EOS	1.7 km	MPC · JPL
514254	2015 PB_{123}	—	March 11, 2005	Mount Lemmon	Mount Lemmon Survey	·	1.7 km	MPC · JPL
514255	2015 PK_{144}	—	May 24, 2011	Haleakala	Pan-STARRS 1	·	1.4 km	MPC · JPL
514256	2015 PS_{254}	—	October 29, 2010	Mount Lemmon	Mount Lemmon Survey	·	3.6 km	MPC · JPL
514257	2015 PP_{289}	—	July 14, 2010	WISE	WISE	EOS	1.7 km	MPC · JPL
514258	2015 PU_{295}	—	September 4, 2011	Haleakala	Pan-STARRS 1	·	1.3 km	MPC · JPL
514259	2015 PV_{304}	—	February 9, 2013	Haleakala	Pan-STARRS 1	·	1.9 km	MPC · JPL
514260	2015 PF_{309}	—	April 14, 2010	WISE	WISE	·	1.8 km	MPC · JPL
514261	2015 PV_{314}	—	May 7, 2014	Haleakala	Pan-STARRS 1	·	1.7 km	MPC · JPL
514262	2015 PK_{315}	—	February 28, 2008	Mount Lemmon	Mount Lemmon Survey	·	3.1 km	MPC · JPL
514263	2015 QA_{11}	—	February 13, 2008	Kitt Peak	Spacewatch	·	1.7 km	MPC · JPL
514264	2015 RC_{19}	—	September 8, 2004	Socorro	LINEAR	·	3.0 km	MPC · JPL
514265	2015 RK_{26}	—	August 25, 2004	Kitt Peak	Spacewatch	EOS	2.2 km	MPC · JPL
514266	2015 RA_{57}	—	October 9, 1999	Kitt Peak	Spacewatch	EOS	1.7 km	MPC · JPL
514267	2015 RJ_{58}	—	April 8, 2013	Mount Lemmon	Mount Lemmon Survey	·	2.6 km	MPC · JPL
514268	2015 RF_{61}	—	October 17, 2010	Mount Lemmon	Mount Lemmon Survey	EOS	1.9 km	MPC · JPL
514269	2015 RG_{64}	—	March 8, 2013	Haleakala	Pan-STARRS 1	·	3.7 km	MPC · JPL
514270	2015 RN_{86}	—	October 9, 2004	Anderson Mesa	LONEOS	VER	3.0 km	MPC · JPL
514271	2015 RA_{87}	—	November 25, 2005	Mount Lemmon	Mount Lemmon Survey	·	4.1 km	MPC · JPL
514272	2015 RJ_{89}	—	November 9, 2004	Catalina	CSS	·	5.0 km	MPC · JPL
514273	2015 RK_{92}	—	October 30, 2010	Mount Lemmon	Mount Lemmon Survey	·	2.7 km	MPC · JPL
514274	2015 RH_{93}	—	October 17, 2007	Mount Lemmon	Mount Lemmon Survey	·	1.5 km	MPC · JPL
514275	2015 RT_{103}	—	February 28, 2014	Haleakala	Pan-STARRS 1	·	1.8 km	MPC · JPL
514276	2015 RA_{105}	—	August 19, 2009	La Sagra	OAM	·	3.4 km	MPC · JPL
514277	2015 RN_{116}	—	September 18, 2010	Mount Lemmon	Mount Lemmon Survey	·	3.4 km	MPC · JPL
514278	2015 RS_{116}	—	December 2, 2005	Mount Lemmon	Mount Lemmon Survey	·	3.8 km	MPC · JPL
514279	2015 RS_{117}	—	January 26, 2012	Mount Lemmon	Mount Lemmon Survey	·	3.0 km	MPC · JPL
514280	2015 RG_{122}	—	August 6, 2005	Siding Spring	SSS	·	2.5 km	MPC · JPL
514281	2015 RK_{192}	—	March 19, 2013	Haleakala	Pan-STARRS 1	·	3.2 km	MPC · JPL
514282	2015 RL_{216}	—	October 30, 2010	Mount Lemmon	Mount Lemmon Survey	·	3.0 km	MPC · JPL
514283	2015 RP_{244}	—	August 19, 2006	Kitt Peak	Spacewatch	·	2.0 km	MPC · JPL
514284	2015 RV_{252}	—	July 27, 2010	WISE	WISE	·	2.3 km	MPC · JPL
514285	2015 RF_{255}	—	January 30, 2006	Kitt Peak	Spacewatch	·	2.8 km	MPC · JPL
514286	2015 RZ_{256}	—	March 11, 2008	Mount Lemmon	Mount Lemmon Survey	·	2.6 km	MPC · JPL
514287	2015 SP_{1}	—	December 5, 2005	Kitt Peak	Spacewatch	·	3.0 km	MPC · JPL
514288	2015 SB_{24}	—	March 10, 2007	Mount Lemmon	Mount Lemmon Survey	·	3.0 km	MPC · JPL
514289	2015 TS_{1}	—	September 14, 2007	Mount Lemmon	Mount Lemmon Survey	3:2	3.9 km	MPC · JPL
514290	2015 TW_{5}	—	August 28, 2006	Kitt Peak	Spacewatch	·	2.1 km	MPC · JPL
514291	2015 TY_{16}	—	November 25, 2011	Haleakala	Pan-STARRS 1	526	2.3 km	MPC · JPL
514292	2015 TV_{17}	—	October 30, 2010	Kitt Peak	Spacewatch	·	3.4 km	MPC · JPL
514293	2015 TO_{26}	—	October 11, 2010	Mount Lemmon	Mount Lemmon Survey	EOS	1.8 km	MPC · JPL
514294	2015 TN_{47}	—	February 21, 2007	Mount Lemmon	Mount Lemmon Survey	·	3.6 km	MPC · JPL
514295	2015 TD_{81}	—	October 4, 2006	Mount Lemmon	Mount Lemmon Survey	EUN	1.4 km	MPC · JPL
514296	2015 TZ_{104}	—	October 8, 2015	Haleakala	Pan-STARRS 1	ELF	3.4 km	MPC · JPL
514297	2015 TR_{127}	—	April 13, 2013	Kitt Peak	Spacewatch	·	3.2 km	MPC · JPL
514298	2015 TT_{194}	—	January 10, 1999	Kitt Peak	Spacewatch	·	1.3 km	MPC · JPL
514299	2015 TT_{197}	—	March 16, 2009	Kitt Peak	Spacewatch	·	1.8 km	MPC · JPL
514300	2015 TA_{198}	—	May 21, 2014	Haleakala	Pan-STARRS 1	·	2.2 km	MPC · JPL

== 514301–514400 ==
back to top

Designation			Discovery			Properties		Ref
Permanent	Provisional	Named after	Date	Site	Discoverer(s)	Category	Diam.	Ref
514301	2015 TU_{213}	—	September 10, 2010	Mount Lemmon	Mount Lemmon Survey	BRA	1.7 km	MPC · JPL
514302	2015 TS_{233}	—	December 2, 2010	Mount Lemmon	Mount Lemmon Survey	·	3.3 km	MPC · JPL
514303	2015 TR_{257}	—	August 17, 1998	Socorro	LINEAR	·	1.6 km	MPC · JPL
514304	2015 TU_{284}	—	September 25, 2008	Kitt Peak	Spacewatch	CYB	3.7 km	MPC · JPL
514305	2015 TR_{292}	—	August 15, 2009	Kitt Peak	Spacewatch	·	3.2 km	MPC · JPL
514306	2015 TK_{294}	—	March 9, 2007	Mount Lemmon	Mount Lemmon Survey	·	3.1 km	MPC · JPL
514307	2015 XM_{126}	—	October 8, 2015	Haleakala	Pan-STARRS 1	·	3.6 km	MPC · JPL
514308	2015 XG_{386}	—	July 28, 2012	Haleakala	Pan-STARRS 1	L5	9.6 km	MPC · JPL
514309	2015 XL_{386}	—	January 15, 2005	Kitt Peak	Spacewatch	L5	8.1 km	MPC · JPL
514310	2015 YA_{2}	—	May 7, 2008	Kitt Peak	Spacewatch	L5	8.0 km	MPC · JPL
514311	2016 AJ_{92}	—	November 30, 2005	Kitt Peak	Spacewatch	EOS	2.2 km	MPC · JPL
514312	2016 AE_{193}	—	October 26, 2006	Lulin	LUSS	centaur	119 km	MPC · JPL
514313	2016 CX_{29}	—	June 1, 2012	Mount Lemmon	Mount Lemmon Survey	·	560 m	MPC · JPL
514314	2016 CJ_{284}	—	August 23, 2008	Siding Spring	SSS	EUN	2.0 km	MPC · JPL
514315	2016 DO_{31}	—	September 28, 2014	Haleakala	Pan-STARRS 1	H	550 m	MPC · JPL
514316	2016 GN_{130}	—	November 8, 2009	Mount Lemmon	Mount Lemmon Survey	·	1.4 km	MPC · JPL
514317	2016 GF_{254}	—	May 24, 2011	Haleakala	Pan-STARRS 1	H	410 m	MPC · JPL
514318	2016 JS_{17}	—	June 4, 2011	Kitt Peak	Spacewatch	H	400 m	MPC · JPL
514319	2016 JC_{34}	—	May 13, 2016	Haleakala	Pan-STARRS 1	H	400 m	MPC · JPL
514320	2016 KF_{4}	—	June 3, 2013	Kitt Peak	Spacewatch	H	480 m	MPC · JPL
514321	2016 LE_{57}	—	March 25, 2007	Mount Lemmon	Mount Lemmon Survey	MAR	830 m	MPC · JPL
514322	2016 NO_{14}	—	October 20, 2011	Siding Spring	SSS	T_{j} (2.98)	3.6 km	MPC · JPL
514323	2016 NT_{56}	—	January 20, 2015	Mount Lemmon	Mount Lemmon Survey	H	420 m	MPC · JPL
514324	2016 NZ_{66}	—	September 15, 2012	Catalina	CSS	·	1.5 km	MPC · JPL
514325	2016 NN_{67}	—	February 18, 2008	Mount Lemmon	Mount Lemmon Survey	·	910 m	MPC · JPL
514326	2016 NS_{67}	—	December 6, 2011	Haleakala	Pan-STARRS 1	·	2.7 km	MPC · JPL
514327	2016 NU_{67}	—	December 27, 2006	Mount Lemmon	Mount Lemmon Survey	V	490 m	MPC · JPL
514328	2016 NN_{68}	—	September 3, 2007	Mount Lemmon	Mount Lemmon Survey	·	4.5 km	MPC · JPL
514329	2016 NS_{68}	—	November 11, 2007	Mount Lemmon	Mount Lemmon Survey	·	2.6 km	MPC · JPL
514330	2016 NO_{70}	—	November 9, 2013	Haleakala	Pan-STARRS 1	·	610 m	MPC · JPL
514331	2016 OQ_{5}	—	January 27, 2007	Kitt Peak	Spacewatch	H	580 m	MPC · JPL
514332	2016 OQ_{6}	—	September 18, 2007	Catalina	CSS	·	2.0 km	MPC · JPL
514333	2016 OS_{6}	—	November 26, 2012	Mount Lemmon	Mount Lemmon Survey	·	1.8 km	MPC · JPL
514334	2016 PV_{4}	—	September 23, 2008	Kitt Peak	Spacewatch	·	910 m	MPC · JPL
514335	2016 PX_{73}	—	August 10, 2016	Haleakala	Pan-STARRS 1	·	2.6 km	MPC · JPL
514336	2016 PE_{76}	—	April 5, 2011	Mount Lemmon	Mount Lemmon Survey	V	570 m	MPC · JPL
514337	2016 PC_{77}	—	January 30, 2011	Mount Lemmon	Mount Lemmon Survey	·	880 m	MPC · JPL
514338	2016 PP_{89}	—	August 10, 2016	Haleakala	Pan-STARRS 1	·	1.5 km	MPC · JPL
514339	2016 PQ_{89}	—	November 20, 2012	Catalina	CSS	·	1.7 km	MPC · JPL
514340	2016 PZ_{89}	—	October 27, 2005	Mount Lemmon	Mount Lemmon Survey	·	1.1 km	MPC · JPL
514341	2016 PZ_{90}	—	March 18, 2010	Kitt Peak	Spacewatch	·	1.5 km	MPC · JPL
514342	2016 PN_{91}	—	October 31, 2006	Mount Lemmon	Mount Lemmon Survey	·	2.5 km	MPC · JPL
514343	2016 PN_{92}	—	September 4, 2010	Mount Lemmon	Mount Lemmon Survey	·	2.3 km	MPC · JPL
514344	2016 PQ_{92}	—	October 1, 2005	Mount Lemmon	Mount Lemmon Survey	·	2.5 km	MPC · JPL
514345	2016 PA_{93}	—	April 5, 2011	Kitt Peak	Spacewatch	·	1.7 km	MPC · JPL
514346	2016 PJ_{93}	—	May 7, 2007	Mount Lemmon	Mount Lemmon Survey	MAR	880 m	MPC · JPL
514347	2016 PF_{94}	—	November 26, 2012	Mount Lemmon	Mount Lemmon Survey	·	1.8 km	MPC · JPL
514348	2016 PM_{94}	—	October 14, 2007	Mount Lemmon	Mount Lemmon Survey	·	1.4 km	MPC · JPL
514349	2016 PN_{94}	—	September 10, 2007	Mount Lemmon	Mount Lemmon Survey	ADE	2.3 km	MPC · JPL
514350	2016 PO_{94}	—	October 16, 2007	Mount Lemmon	Mount Lemmon Survey	·	1.6 km	MPC · JPL
514351	2016 PF_{96}	—	January 30, 2008	Mount Lemmon	Mount Lemmon Survey	·	730 m	MPC · JPL
514352	2016 PL_{96}	—	March 5, 2008	Mount Lemmon	Mount Lemmon Survey	·	610 m	MPC · JPL
514353	2016 PR_{97}	—	November 8, 2008	Mount Lemmon	Mount Lemmon Survey	·	2.0 km	MPC · JPL
514354	2016 PN_{98}	—	October 19, 2012	Mount Lemmon	Mount Lemmon Survey	·	1.2 km	MPC · JPL
514355	2016 QO	—	March 3, 2006	Kitt Peak	Spacewatch	·	1.0 km	MPC · JPL
514356	2016 QB_{9}	—	October 6, 2008	Catalina	CSS	·	1.3 km	MPC · JPL
514357	2016 QF_{9}	—	April 23, 2015	Haleakala	Pan-STARRS 1	·	980 m	MPC · JPL
514358	2016 QQ_{15}	—	September 2, 2013	Mount Lemmon	Mount Lemmon Survey	·	670 m	MPC · JPL
514359	2016 QO_{23}	—	February 5, 2011	Haleakala	Pan-STARRS 1	·	820 m	MPC · JPL
514360	2016 QP_{24}	—	September 30, 2006	Catalina	CSS	·	790 m	MPC · JPL
514361	2016 QG_{31}	—	April 5, 2008	Mount Lemmon	Mount Lemmon Survey	·	980 m	MPC · JPL
514362	2016 QH_{48}	—	October 19, 2012	Mount Lemmon	Mount Lemmon Survey	·	1.6 km	MPC · JPL
514363	2016 QU_{48}	—	April 11, 2008	Mount Lemmon	Mount Lemmon Survey	·	2.2 km	MPC · JPL
514364	2016 QR_{54}	—	July 7, 2016	Haleakala	Pan-STARRS 1	·	1.6 km	MPC · JPL
514365	2016 QT_{70}	—	December 3, 2010	Mount Lemmon	Mount Lemmon Survey	·	570 m	MPC · JPL
514366	2016 QR_{83}	—	November 18, 2011	Mount Lemmon	Mount Lemmon Survey	·	2.0 km	MPC · JPL
514367	2016 QE_{87}	—	December 30, 2013	Kitt Peak	Spacewatch	·	1.1 km	MPC · JPL
514368	2016 QM_{87}	—	September 11, 2007	Kitt Peak	Spacewatch	·	1.4 km	MPC · JPL
514369	2016 QE_{88}	—	March 3, 2005	Catalina	CSS	·	1.8 km	MPC · JPL
514370	2016 QG_{88}	—	October 30, 2006	Catalina	CSS	EOS	2.0 km	MPC · JPL
514371	2016 QH_{88}	—	October 8, 2005	Catalina	CSS	·	3.3 km	MPC · JPL
514372	2016 QS_{88}	—	October 30, 2007	Mount Lemmon	Mount Lemmon Survey	·	1.5 km	MPC · JPL
514373	2016 QZ_{88}	—	September 13, 2007	Mount Lemmon	Mount Lemmon Survey	·	2.2 km	MPC · JPL
514374	2016 QF_{89}	—	December 30, 2008	Kitt Peak	Spacewatch	·	1.4 km	MPC · JPL
514375	2016 RC_{6}	—	September 12, 2005	Kitt Peak	Spacewatch	·	2.2 km	MPC · JPL
514376	2016 RK_{7}	—	October 7, 2008	Kitt Peak	Spacewatch	·	900 m	MPC · JPL
514377	2016 RT_{12}	—	October 7, 2012	Haleakala	Pan-STARRS 1	·	1.3 km	MPC · JPL
514378	2016 RJ_{27}	—	September 13, 2007	Mount Lemmon	Mount Lemmon Survey	NEM	1.6 km	MPC · JPL
514379	2016 RP_{27}	—	April 30, 2010	WISE	WISE	·	4.1 km	MPC · JPL
514380	2016 RV_{30}	—	August 25, 2012	Haleakala	Pan-STARRS 1	·	1.2 km	MPC · JPL
514381	2016 RD_{31}	—	March 29, 2015	Haleakala	Pan-STARRS 1	·	850 m	MPC · JPL
514382	2016 RJ_{33}	—	May 25, 2010	WISE	WISE	TIR	3.3 km	MPC · JPL
514383	2016 RR_{38}	—	January 18, 2009	Kitt Peak	Spacewatch	·	2.1 km	MPC · JPL
514384	2016 RK_{43}	—	August 30, 2016	Haleakala	Pan-STARRS 1	EUP	3.0 km	MPC · JPL
514385	2016 RT_{44}	—	September 3, 2016	Kitt Peak	Spacewatch	·	1.8 km	MPC · JPL
514386	2016 RJ_{45}	—	October 20, 2012	Haleakala	Pan-STARRS 1	·	2.1 km	MPC · JPL
514387	2016 RS_{45}	—	October 13, 2007	Mount Lemmon	Mount Lemmon Survey	·	1.3 km	MPC · JPL
514388	2016 SF_{11}	—	September 15, 2007	Kitt Peak	Spacewatch	·	1.4 km	MPC · JPL
514389	2016 SM_{13}	—	October 29, 2008	Mount Lemmon	Mount Lemmon Survey	·	1.1 km	MPC · JPL
514390	2016 SW_{14}	—	January 10, 2014	Mount Lemmon	Mount Lemmon Survey	·	1.2 km	MPC · JPL
514391	2016 SQ_{15}	—	September 29, 2005	Kitt Peak	Spacewatch	·	1.1 km	MPC · JPL
514392	2016 SO_{17}	—	February 28, 2009	Kitt Peak	Spacewatch	·	1.6 km	MPC · JPL
514393	2016 SJ_{18}	—	October 16, 2012	Catalina	CSS	MAR	1.0 km	MPC · JPL
514394	2016 SS_{23}	—	January 1, 2009	Mount Lemmon	Mount Lemmon Survey	·	1.3 km	MPC · JPL
514395	2016 SV_{23}	—	October 21, 2011	Mount Lemmon	Mount Lemmon Survey	·	1.9 km	MPC · JPL
514396	2016 SH_{26}	—	August 4, 2003	Kitt Peak	Spacewatch	·	590 m	MPC · JPL
514397	2016 SR_{27}	—	October 1, 2000	Kitt Peak	Spacewatch	·	590 m	MPC · JPL
514398	2016 SL_{34}	—	October 19, 2003	Kitt Peak	Spacewatch	·	1.3 km	MPC · JPL
514399	2016 SU_{37}	—	October 9, 2008	Kitt Peak	Spacewatch	(5)	930 m	MPC · JPL
514400	2016 SF_{49}	—	May 16, 2009	Kitt Peak	Spacewatch	EOS	1.5 km	MPC · JPL

== 514401–514500 ==
back to top

Designation			Discovery			Properties		Ref
Permanent	Provisional	Named after	Date	Site	Discoverer(s)	Category	Diam.	Ref
514401	2016 SB_{50}	—	July 16, 2010	WISE	WISE	·	4.8 km	MPC · JPL
514402	2016 SG_{50}	—	April 5, 2008	Mount Lemmon	Mount Lemmon Survey	·	2.9 km	MPC · JPL
514403	2016 TG_{5}	—	November 12, 2005	Kitt Peak	Spacewatch	·	1.0 km	MPC · JPL
514404	2016 TK_{7}	—	September 14, 2007	Mount Lemmon	Mount Lemmon Survey	AGN	980 m	MPC · JPL
514405	2016 TH_{8}	—	December 29, 2008	Mount Lemmon	Mount Lemmon Survey	·	1.3 km	MPC · JPL
514406	2016 TF_{45}	—	December 9, 1996	Kitt Peak	Spacewatch	·	1.5 km	MPC · JPL
514407	2016 TW_{46}	—	November 5, 2005	Kitt Peak	Spacewatch	·	1.2 km	MPC · JPL
514408	2016 TE_{47}	—	September 11, 2007	Mount Lemmon	Mount Lemmon Survey	·	1.6 km	MPC · JPL
514409	2016 TA_{49}	—	March 1, 2011	Mount Lemmon	Mount Lemmon Survey	·	880 m	MPC · JPL
514410	2016 TW_{56}	—	February 7, 2011	Mount Lemmon	Mount Lemmon Survey	·	1.0 km	MPC · JPL
514411	2016 TB_{63}	—	January 1, 2009	Mount Lemmon	Mount Lemmon Survey	·	1.1 km	MPC · JPL
514412	2016 TW_{73}	—	March 12, 2005	Kitt Peak	Spacewatch	·	1.4 km	MPC · JPL
514413	2016 TW_{75}	—	December 29, 2014	Haleakala	Pan-STARRS 1	PHO	1.1 km	MPC · JPL
514414	2016 TX_{81}	—	February 26, 2014	Mount Lemmon	Mount Lemmon Survey	HNS	1.2 km	MPC · JPL
514415	2016 TE_{88}	—	October 3, 2005	Kitt Peak	Spacewatch	EOS	1.5 km	MPC · JPL
514416	2016 TM_{88}	—	May 8, 2014	Haleakala	Pan-STARRS 1	EOS	1.9 km	MPC · JPL
514417	2016 TR_{96}	—	January 27, 2007	Mount Lemmon	Mount Lemmon Survey	·	3.5 km	MPC · JPL
514418	2016 TU_{96}	—	November 16, 2011	Mount Lemmon	Mount Lemmon Survey	·	2.6 km	MPC · JPL
514419	2016 TX_{96}	—	November 18, 2007	Kitt Peak	Spacewatch	·	1.9 km	MPC · JPL
514420	2016 TY_{96}	—	September 22, 2012	Kitt Peak	Spacewatch	·	1.1 km	MPC · JPL
514421	2016 TD_{97}	—	February 1, 2008	Mount Lemmon	Mount Lemmon Survey	·	5.3 km	MPC · JPL
514422	2016 TE_{97}	—	March 5, 2013	Mount Lemmon	Mount Lemmon Survey	·	2.8 km	MPC · JPL
514423	2016 UH_{2}	—	March 19, 2007	Mount Lemmon	Mount Lemmon Survey	V	610 m	MPC · JPL
514424	2016 UQ_{2}	—	September 24, 2008	Kitt Peak	Spacewatch	3:2	4.6 km	MPC · JPL
514425	2016 UR_{2}	—	November 9, 2007	Kitt Peak	Spacewatch	HOF	2.0 km	MPC · JPL
514426	2016 UH_{9}	—	October 10, 2012	Haleakala	Pan-STARRS 1	·	1.2 km	MPC · JPL
514427	2016 UH_{10}	—	November 7, 2012	Haleakala	Pan-STARRS 1	·	1.0 km	MPC · JPL
514428	2016 UB_{11}	—	July 28, 2008	Mount Lemmon	Mount Lemmon Survey	·	1.1 km	MPC · JPL
514429	2016 UU_{12}	—	November 27, 2010	Mount Lemmon	Mount Lemmon Survey	·	930 m	MPC · JPL
514430	2016 UO_{14}	—	September 20, 2009	Mount Lemmon	Mount Lemmon Survey	·	820 m	MPC · JPL
514431	2016 UO_{19}	—	March 17, 2015	Haleakala	Pan-STARRS 1	·	910 m	MPC · JPL
514432	2016 UG_{22}	—	October 29, 2003	Kitt Peak	Spacewatch	PAD	1.8 km	MPC · JPL
514433	2016 UJ_{22}	—	June 26, 2011	Mount Lemmon	Mount Lemmon Survey	·	2.0 km	MPC · JPL
514434	2016 UK_{22}	—	November 12, 2012	Mount Lemmon	Mount Lemmon Survey	·	1.8 km	MPC · JPL
514435	2016 UZ_{22}	—	October 16, 2006	Catalina	CSS	·	630 m	MPC · JPL
514436	2016 UU_{23}	—	October 8, 2007	Kitt Peak	Spacewatch	·	1.7 km	MPC · JPL
514437	2016 UV_{24}	—	August 26, 2009	La Sagra	OAM	·	600 m	MPC · JPL
514438	2016 UX_{24}	—	October 16, 2006	Kitt Peak	Spacewatch	·	1.8 km	MPC · JPL
514439	2016 UF_{33}	—	March 3, 2009	Mount Lemmon	Mount Lemmon Survey	·	2.0 km	MPC · JPL
514440	2016 UG_{33}	—	February 1, 2009	Kitt Peak	Spacewatch	HOF	2.4 km	MPC · JPL
514441	2016 UL_{33}	—	September 24, 1995	Kitt Peak	Spacewatch	·	1.4 km	MPC · JPL
514442	2016 UJ_{43}	—	October 10, 1994	Kitt Peak	Spacewatch	·	1.3 km	MPC · JPL
514443	2016 UV_{45}	—	November 2, 2011	Mount Lemmon	Mount Lemmon Survey	EOS	1.7 km	MPC · JPL
514444	2016 UM_{47}	—	July 28, 2011	Haleakala	Pan-STARRS 1	·	1.7 km	MPC · JPL
514445	2016 UR_{51}	—	September 19, 1995	Kitt Peak	Spacewatch	·	1.2 km	MPC · JPL
514446	2016 UV_{53}	—	March 26, 2007	Mount Lemmon	Mount Lemmon Survey	·	1.1 km	MPC · JPL
514447	2016 UC_{54}	—	May 8, 2005	Kitt Peak	Spacewatch	·	670 m	MPC · JPL
514448	2016 UM_{60}	—	September 21, 2011	Haleakala	Pan-STARRS 1	HOF	2.4 km	MPC · JPL
514449	2016 UZ_{68}	—	December 22, 2003	Kitt Peak	Spacewatch	AST	1.7 km	MPC · JPL
514450	2016 UW_{70}	—	October 16, 2012	Kitt Peak	Spacewatch	EUN	1.2 km	MPC · JPL
514451	2016 UM_{74}	—	October 22, 2012	Haleakala	Pan-STARRS 1	·	1.0 km	MPC · JPL
514452	2016 UJ_{80}	—	November 25, 2005	Mount Lemmon	Mount Lemmon Survey	·	3.0 km	MPC · JPL
514453	2016 UE_{81}	—	September 25, 2006	Mount Lemmon	Mount Lemmon Survey	KOR	1.1 km	MPC · JPL
514454	2016 UB_{82}	—	October 26, 2011	Haleakala	Pan-STARRS 1	EOS	1.4 km	MPC · JPL
514455	2016 UM_{86}	—	September 10, 2007	Kitt Peak	Spacewatch	·	1.4 km	MPC · JPL
514456	2016 UB_{89}	—	March 31, 2009	Kitt Peak	Spacewatch	·	3.2 km	MPC · JPL
514457	2016 UW_{89}	—	March 18, 2010	Kitt Peak	Spacewatch	HNS	830 m	MPC · JPL
514458	2016 UV_{92}	—	September 13, 2007	Mount Lemmon	Mount Lemmon Survey	·	1.3 km	MPC · JPL
514459	2016 UJ_{97}	—	December 3, 2012	Mount Lemmon	Mount Lemmon Survey	·	1.3 km	MPC · JPL
514460	2016 UP_{98}	—	March 8, 2005	Kitt Peak	Spacewatch	·	1.5 km	MPC · JPL
514461	2016 UE_{99}	—	November 30, 2003	Kitt Peak	Spacewatch	·	1.6 km	MPC · JPL
514462	2016 UG_{106}	—	March 27, 2008	Mount Lemmon	Mount Lemmon Survey	·	670 m	MPC · JPL
514463	2016 UJ_{106}	—	October 7, 2007	Mount Lemmon	Mount Lemmon Survey	·	1.4 km	MPC · JPL
514464	2016 UR_{118}	—	October 23, 2008	Kitt Peak	Spacewatch	·	1.1 km	MPC · JPL
514465	2016 UF_{124}	—	December 10, 2005	Catalina	CSS	·	3.7 km	MPC · JPL
514466	2016 UT_{135}	—	September 30, 2016	Haleakala	Pan-STARRS 1	·	3.0 km	MPC · JPL
514467	2016 UV_{136}	—	November 25, 2011	Haleakala	Pan-STARRS 1	EOS	1.8 km	MPC · JPL
514468	2016 UT_{139}	—	June 30, 2010	WISE	WISE	·	2.8 km	MPC · JPL
514469	2016 UX_{145}	—	April 5, 2014	Haleakala	Pan-STARRS 1	·	2.8 km	MPC · JPL
514470	2016 UG_{146}	—	October 8, 2005	Kitt Peak	Spacewatch	·	2.5 km	MPC · JPL
514471	2016 UQ_{146}	—	November 24, 2008	Mount Lemmon	Mount Lemmon Survey	·	1.4 km	MPC · JPL
514472	2016 UC_{148}	—	September 8, 2011	Kitt Peak	Spacewatch	AST	1.5 km	MPC · JPL
514473	2016 UD_{148}	—	February 9, 2005	Mount Lemmon	Mount Lemmon Survey	·	1.4 km	MPC · JPL
514474	2016 UL_{148}	—	April 9, 2010	Kitt Peak	Spacewatch	·	1.5 km	MPC · JPL
514475	2016 VR_{7}	—	October 9, 2010	Mount Lemmon	Mount Lemmon Survey	·	1.9 km	MPC · JPL
514476	2016 VW_{8}	—	March 15, 2010	Mount Lemmon	Mount Lemmon Survey	·	1.2 km	MPC · JPL
514477	2016 VB_{9}	—	October 21, 2011	Kitt Peak	Spacewatch	KOR	1.2 km	MPC · JPL
514478	2016 VU_{14}	—	October 11, 2007	Mount Lemmon	Mount Lemmon Survey	·	1.6 km	MPC · JPL
514479	2016 VB_{15}	—	September 27, 2005	Palomar	NEAT	·	3.8 km	MPC · JPL
514480	2016 VD_{15}	—	September 3, 1999	Kitt Peak	Spacewatch	·	1.4 km	MPC · JPL
514481	2016 VF_{17}	—	October 27, 2005	Anderson Mesa	LONEOS	·	2.5 km	MPC · JPL
514482	2016 VK_{18}	—	October 27, 2008	Mount Lemmon	Mount Lemmon Survey	·	1.2 km	MPC · JPL
514483	2016 VS_{18}	—	March 13, 2010	Mount Lemmon	Mount Lemmon Survey	KON	2.5 km	MPC · JPL
514484	2016 VO_{19}	—	February 18, 2008	Mount Lemmon	Mount Lemmon Survey	·	2.8 km	MPC · JPL
514485	2016 VP_{19}	—	May 21, 2014	Haleakala	Pan-STARRS 1	·	1.8 km	MPC · JPL
514486	2016 WJ_{4}	—	October 16, 2003	Kitt Peak	Spacewatch	·	1.7 km	MPC · JPL
514487	2016 WS_{4}	—	December 3, 2012	Mount Lemmon	Mount Lemmon Survey	·	1.7 km	MPC · JPL
514488	2016 WY_{5}	—	October 11, 2010	Kitt Peak	Spacewatch	·	3.5 km	MPC · JPL
514489	2016 WM_{10}	—	December 6, 2012	Kitt Peak	Spacewatch	NEM	2.0 km	MPC · JPL
514490	2016 WQ_{11}	—	January 30, 2012	Mount Lemmon	Mount Lemmon Survey	·	2.7 km	MPC · JPL
514491	2016 WA_{12}	—	May 25, 2015	Haleakala	Pan-STARRS 1	·	1.2 km	MPC · JPL
514492	2016 WG_{14}	—	September 19, 2006	Kitt Peak	Spacewatch	KOR	1.1 km	MPC · JPL
514493	2016 WZ_{14}	—	December 6, 2012	Mount Lemmon	Mount Lemmon Survey	(5)	1.3 km	MPC · JPL
514494	2016 WA_{16}	—	March 8, 2005	Kitt Peak	Spacewatch	·	1.9 km	MPC · JPL
514495	2016 WL_{18}	—	April 4, 2014	Haleakala	Pan-STARRS 1	·	1.4 km	MPC · JPL
514496	2016 WS_{18}	—	October 27, 2005	Mount Lemmon	Mount Lemmon Survey	VER	2.3 km	MPC · JPL
514497	2016 WB_{19}	—	October 21, 2003	Kitt Peak	Spacewatch	·	1.6 km	MPC · JPL
514498	2016 WL_{19}	—	December 6, 2005	Kitt Peak	Spacewatch	·	2.6 km	MPC · JPL
514499	2016 WU_{19}	—	December 23, 2012	Haleakala	Pan-STARRS 1	·	1.7 km	MPC · JPL
514500	2016 WE_{21}	—	September 24, 2011	Haleakala	Pan-STARRS 1	·	1.8 km	MPC · JPL

== 514501–514600 ==
back to top

Designation			Discovery			Properties		Ref
Permanent	Provisional	Named after	Date	Site	Discoverer(s)	Category	Diam.	Ref
514501	2016 WS_{23}	—	December 25, 2011	Catalina	CSS	TIR	3.1 km	MPC · JPL
514502	2016 WB_{24}	—	July 7, 2014	Haleakala	Pan-STARRS 1	TIR	3.1 km	MPC · JPL
514503	2016 WD_{24}	—	January 28, 2014	Kitt Peak	Spacewatch	·	1.4 km	MPC · JPL
514504	2016 WU_{24}	—	February 19, 2009	Kitt Peak	Spacewatch	·	1.9 km	MPC · JPL
514505	2016 WM_{25}	—	October 28, 2010	Mount Lemmon	Mount Lemmon Survey	·	2.4 km	MPC · JPL
514506	2016 WA_{30}	—	December 12, 2012	Mount Lemmon	Mount Lemmon Survey	·	1.1 km	MPC · JPL
514507	2016 WK_{30}	—	February 8, 2007	Kitt Peak	Spacewatch	·	2.8 km	MPC · JPL
514508	2016 WR_{31}	—	September 18, 2011	Mount Lemmon	Mount Lemmon Survey	HOF	2.3 km	MPC · JPL
514509	2016 WT_{33}	—	April 4, 2011	Mount Lemmon	Mount Lemmon Survey	·	1.3 km	MPC · JPL
514510	2016 WP_{36}	—	November 2, 2007	Kitt Peak	Spacewatch	EUN	1.3 km	MPC · JPL
514511	2016 WT_{36}	—	September 4, 2010	Mount Lemmon	Mount Lemmon Survey	·	1.8 km	MPC · JPL
514512	2016 WC_{37}	—	April 26, 2007	Mount Lemmon	Mount Lemmon Survey	·	3.4 km	MPC · JPL
514513	2016 WT_{37}	—	November 25, 2005	Kitt Peak	Spacewatch	·	2.7 km	MPC · JPL
514514	2016 WR_{39}	—	June 29, 2011	Siding Spring	SSS	BRG	1.7 km	MPC · JPL
514515	2016 WR_{44}	—	October 11, 2010	Mount Lemmon	Mount Lemmon Survey	VER	2.4 km	MPC · JPL
514516	2016 WW_{44}	—	October 19, 2010	Mount Lemmon	Mount Lemmon Survey	VER	2.6 km	MPC · JPL
514517	2016 WL_{46}	—	September 22, 2011	Kitt Peak	Spacewatch	·	1.6 km	MPC · JPL
514518	2016 WS_{46}	—	March 31, 2008	Kitt Peak	Spacewatch	·	840 m	MPC · JPL
514519	2016 WH_{47}	—	November 26, 2005	Kitt Peak	Spacewatch	·	2.9 km	MPC · JPL
514520	2016 WL_{47}	—	November 1, 2010	Catalina	CSS	·	3.3 km	MPC · JPL
514521	2016 WX_{48}	—	September 13, 2007	Mount Lemmon	Mount Lemmon Survey	·	1.4 km	MPC · JPL
514522	2016 WJ_{51}	—	December 31, 2008	Catalina	CSS	RAF	1.3 km	MPC · JPL
514523	2016 WH_{52}	—	February 9, 2003	Kitt Peak	Spacewatch	·	2.8 km	MPC · JPL
514524	2016 WO_{52}	—	December 15, 2006	Kitt Peak	Spacewatch	·	2.1 km	MPC · JPL
514525	2016 WV_{55}	—	April 11, 2008	Mount Lemmon	Mount Lemmon Survey	·	3.1 km	MPC · JPL
514526	2016 WU_{56}	—	July 7, 2010	WISE	WISE	·	2.5 km	MPC · JPL
514527	2016 XY_{2}	—	October 30, 2005	Mount Lemmon	Mount Lemmon Survey	·	2.8 km	MPC · JPL
514528	2016 XS_{3}	—	December 2, 2008	Kitt Peak	Spacewatch	·	1.3 km	MPC · JPL
514529	2016 XB_{11}	—	February 17, 2004	Kitt Peak	Spacewatch	AGN	1.1 km	MPC · JPL
514530	2016 XN_{21}	—	September 29, 2011	Mount Lemmon	Mount Lemmon Survey	·	2.4 km	MPC · JPL
514531	2016 YT_{6}	—	November 4, 2010	Mount Lemmon	Mount Lemmon Survey	·	3.3 km	MPC · JPL
514532	2016 YA_{7}	—	January 4, 2013	Mount Lemmon	Mount Lemmon Survey	(5)	1.2 km	MPC · JPL
514533	2016 YZ_{11}	—	March 12, 2008	Mount Lemmon	Mount Lemmon Survey	·	2.3 km	MPC · JPL
514534	2017 AG_{17}	—	September 18, 2003	Kitt Peak	Spacewatch	·	4.0 km	MPC · JPL
514535	2017 BX_{27}	—	February 14, 2005	Kitt Peak	Spacewatch	L5	10 km	MPC · JPL
514536	2017 BE_{31}	—	March 31, 2008	Kitt Peak	Spacewatch	L5	9.7 km	MPC · JPL
514537	2017 BK_{35}	—	December 26, 2005	Kitt Peak	Spacewatch	·	2.7 km	MPC · JPL
514538	2017 BB_{57}	—	December 10, 2005	Kitt Peak	Spacewatch	·	2.4 km	MPC · JPL
514539	2017 BM_{84}	—	March 27, 2012	Mount Lemmon	Mount Lemmon Survey	·	3.2 km	MPC · JPL
514540	2017 BJ_{91}	—	April 19, 2010	WISE	WISE	L5	10 km	MPC · JPL
514541	2017 BZ_{96}	—	April 23, 2007	Mount Lemmon	Mount Lemmon Survey	L5	7.1 km	MPC · JPL
514542	2017 CV	—	November 21, 2014	Haleakala	Pan-STARRS 1	L5	9.0 km	MPC · JPL
514543	2017 DL_{1}	—	April 21, 2010	WISE	WISE	L5	10 km	MPC · JPL
514544	2017 DF_{110}	—	July 28, 2011	Haleakala	Pan-STARRS 1	L5	8.0 km	MPC · JPL
514545	2017 EO_{18}	—	January 29, 2010	WISE	WISE	·	5.2 km	MPC · JPL
514546	2017 SK_{23}	—	September 25, 2008	Kitt Peak	Spacewatch	AGN	1.0 km	MPC · JPL
514547	2017 TS_{8}	—	October 6, 2008	Mount Lemmon	Mount Lemmon Survey	·	1.8 km	MPC · JPL
514548	2017 UR_{44}	—	December 23, 2012	Haleakala	Pan-STARRS 1	H	540 m	MPC · JPL
514549	2017 VP	—	May 30, 2014	Mount Lemmon	Mount Lemmon Survey	H	490 m	MPC · JPL
514550	2017 VV_{31}	—	April 23, 2007	Kitt Peak	Spacewatch	·	1.4 km	MPC · JPL
514551	2017 VP_{33}	—	December 14, 2001	Socorro	LINEAR	·	3.0 km	MPC · JPL
514552	2017 WW_{2}	—	November 9, 2008	Mount Lemmon	Mount Lemmon Survey	·	1.8 km	MPC · JPL
514553	2017 WS_{4}	—	December 1, 2005	Mount Lemmon	Mount Lemmon Survey	BRG	1.8 km	MPC · JPL
514554	2017 WT_{5}	—	December 28, 2013	Kitt Peak	Spacewatch	·	1.4 km	MPC · JPL
514555	2017 WX_{8}	—	December 17, 2009	Mount Lemmon	Mount Lemmon Survey	·	1.5 km	MPC · JPL
514556	2017 WJ_{9}	—	October 28, 2006	Mount Lemmon	Mount Lemmon Survey	THB	3.2 km	MPC · JPL
514557	2017 WY_{9}	—	April 17, 2009	Kitt Peak	Spacewatch	·	970 m	MPC · JPL
514558	2017 WV_{10}	—	December 29, 1995	Kitt Peak	Spacewatch	·	3.5 km	MPC · JPL
514559	2017 WQ_{27}	—	December 4, 2008	Catalina	CSS	·	2.1 km	MPC · JPL
514560	2017 XP	—	November 5, 1999	Socorro	LINEAR	·	1.3 km	MPC · JPL
514561	2017 XE_{3}	—	January 6, 2005	Catalina	CSS	·	2.2 km	MPC · JPL
514562	2017 XF_{40}	—	October 10, 2008	Mount Lemmon	Mount Lemmon Survey	·	2.0 km	MPC · JPL
514563	2017 XB_{59}	—	December 10, 2005	Kitt Peak	Spacewatch	EUN	1.1 km	MPC · JPL
514564	2017 XC_{59}	—	February 9, 2008	Mount Lemmon	Mount Lemmon Survey	PHO	860 m	MPC · JPL
514565	2017 XE_{61}	—	December 19, 2008	Socorro	LINEAR	·	2.2 km	MPC · JPL
514566	2017 YK	—	April 25, 2007	Kitt Peak	Spacewatch	T_{j} (2.99)	3.6 km	MPC · JPL
514567	2017 YW_{2}	—	October 23, 2004	Kitt Peak	Spacewatch	·	1.3 km	MPC · JPL
514568	1994 RC	—	September 1, 1994	Palomar	E. F. Helin, J. Alu	APO · PHA	510 m	MPC · JPL
514569	1995 OJ_{12}	—	July 22, 1995	Kitt Peak	Spacewatch	·	1.0 km	MPC · JPL
514570	1995 VK_{11}	—	November 15, 1995	Kitt Peak	Spacewatch	·	1.4 km	MPC · JPL
514571	1996 RY_{3}	—	September 15, 1996	Haleakala	NEAT	AMO	290 m	MPC · JPL
514572	1997 SU_{21}	—	September 30, 1997	Kitt Peak	Spacewatch	·	480 m	MPC · JPL
514573	1997 WG_{6}	—	November 23, 1997	Kitt Peak	Spacewatch	·	3.8 km	MPC · JPL
514574	1999 TM_{309}	—	October 6, 1999	Kitt Peak	Spacewatch	EUN	800 m	MPC · JPL
514575	1999 UY_{28}	—	October 17, 1999	Kitt Peak	Spacewatch	·	1.3 km	MPC · JPL
514576	1999 VZ_{131}	—	November 9, 1999	Kitt Peak	Spacewatch	·	520 m	MPC · JPL
514577	2000 CR_{99}	—	February 8, 2000	Kitt Peak	Spacewatch	·	1.4 km	MPC · JPL
514578	2000 EP_{51}	—	March 3, 2000	Kitt Peak	Spacewatch	·	760 m	MPC · JPL
514579	2000 SS_{364}	—	September 20, 2000	Socorro	LINEAR	·	1.0 km	MPC · JPL
514580	2001 PL_{21}	—	August 10, 2001	Haleakala	NEAT	·	1.6 km	MPC · JPL
514581	2001 PC_{53}	—	August 14, 2001	Haleakala	NEAT	·	750 m	MPC · JPL
514582	2001 RX_{19}	—	September 7, 2001	Socorro	LINEAR	·	2.0 km	MPC · JPL
514583	2001 SL_{36}	—	September 16, 2001	Socorro	LINEAR	H	420 m	MPC · JPL
514584	2001 SV_{243}	—	September 11, 2001	Kitt Peak	Spacewatch	·	1.0 km	MPC · JPL
514585	2001 TR_{180}	—	October 13, 2001	Anderson Mesa	LONEOS	ERI	1.4 km	MPC · JPL
514586	2001 UO_{17}	—	September 26, 2001	Socorro	LINEAR	H	460 m	MPC · JPL
514587	2001 WK_{104}	—	April 4, 2008	Kitt Peak	Spacewatch	L5	7.4 km	MPC · JPL
514588	2001 XS_{62}	—	December 10, 2001	Socorro	LINEAR	·	1.5 km	MPC · JPL
514589	2001 YJ	—	December 17, 2001	Socorro	LINEAR	H	540 m	MPC · JPL
514590	2001 YQ_{48}	—	December 18, 2001	Socorro	LINEAR	·	1.1 km	MPC · JPL
514591	2002 AR_{31}	—	January 13, 2002	Socorro	LINEAR	H	400 m	MPC · JPL
514592	2002 OM_{18}	—	July 18, 2002	Socorro	LINEAR	·	1.1 km	MPC · JPL
514593	2002 SQ_{75}	—	September 15, 2002	Anderson Mesa	LONEOS	·	4.6 km	MPC · JPL
514594	2002 VG_{86}	—	October 30, 2002	Kitt Peak	Spacewatch	PHO	950 m	MPC · JPL
514595	2002 WF_{22}	—	November 23, 2002	Palomar	NEAT	MAS	630 m	MPC · JPL
514596	2003 FG	—	March 23, 2003	Desert Eagle	W. K. Y. Yeung	APO · PHA	400 m	MPC · JPL
514597	2003 MD_{7}	—	June 29, 2003	Socorro	LINEAR	APO	320 m	MPC · JPL
514598	2003 OK_{33}	—	July 24, 2003	Palomar	NEAT	·	1.2 km	MPC · JPL
514599	2003 SE_{70}	—	September 17, 2003	Kitt Peak	Spacewatch	(5)	1.4 km	MPC · JPL
514600	2003 SF_{130}	—	September 19, 2003	Kitt Peak	Spacewatch	·	1.3 km	MPC · JPL

== 514601–514700 ==
back to top

Designation			Discovery			Properties		Ref
Permanent	Provisional	Named after	Date	Site	Discoverer(s)	Category	Diam.	Ref
514601	2003 ST_{186}	—	September 22, 2003	Anderson Mesa	LONEOS	(5)	1.2 km	MPC · JPL
514602	2003 SN_{221}	—	September 27, 2003	Socorro	LINEAR	(5)	1.2 km	MPC · JPL
514603	2003 SF_{246}	—	September 26, 2003	Socorro	LINEAR	H	470 m	MPC · JPL
514604	2003 SW_{276}	—	September 30, 2003	Socorro	LINEAR	EUN	1.1 km	MPC · JPL
514605	2003 SC_{328}	—	September 20, 2003	Campo Imperatore	CINEOS	·	2.0 km	MPC · JPL
514606	2003 SU_{334}	—	September 26, 2003	Apache Point	SDSS	·	1.2 km	MPC · JPL
514607	2003 SO_{346}	—	September 18, 2003	Kitt Peak	Spacewatch	LIX	2.7 km	MPC · JPL
514608	2003 SO_{429}	—	September 27, 2003	Kitt Peak	Spacewatch	·	1.2 km	MPC · JPL
514609	2003 TY_{7}	—	October 14, 2003	Anderson Mesa	LONEOS	·	500 m	MPC · JPL
514610	2003 TL_{45}	—	September 21, 2003	Kitt Peak	Spacewatch	·	1.6 km	MPC · JPL
514611	2003 UK_{20}	—	October 22, 2003	Kitt Peak	Spacewatch	·	1.5 km	MPC · JPL
514612	2003 UJ_{317}	—	October 19, 2003	Apache Point	SDSS	·	1.1 km	MPC · JPL
514613	2003 UW_{332}	—	October 18, 2003	Apache Point	SDSS	·	1.0 km	MPC · JPL
514614	2003 WD_{61}	—	November 19, 2003	Kitt Peak	Spacewatch	·	1.2 km	MPC · JPL
514615	2003 XJ_{21}	—	December 14, 2003	Kitt Peak	Spacewatch	·	2.0 km	MPC · JPL
514616	2004 BX_{163}	—	April 8, 2010	WISE	WISE	L5	10 km	MPC · JPL
514617	2004 CU_{53}	—	February 11, 2004	Kitt Peak	Spacewatch	·	1.7 km	MPC · JPL
514618	2004 EC_{24}	—	March 15, 2004	Valmeca	Valmeca	·	1.6 km	MPC · JPL
514619	2004 FJ_{8}	—	March 16, 2004	Kitt Peak	Spacewatch	·	720 m	MPC · JPL
514620	2004 KO_{19}	—	July 7, 2005	Kitt Peak	Spacewatch	3:2	5.8 km	MPC · JPL
514621	2004 PF_{68}	—	August 6, 2004	Palomar	NEAT	·	1.3 km	MPC · JPL
514622	2004 PL_{106}	—	August 8, 2004	Campo Imperatore	CINEOS	·	2.1 km	MPC · JPL
514623	2004 RA_{246}	—	September 10, 2004	Kitt Peak	Spacewatch	LIX	3.1 km	MPC · JPL
514624	2004 RD_{265}	—	September 10, 2004	Kitt Peak	Spacewatch	·	720 m	MPC · JPL
514625	2004 RA_{303}	—	September 12, 2004	Kitt Peak	Spacewatch	·	2.5 km	MPC · JPL
514626	2004 SO_{4}	—	August 10, 2004	Campo Imperatore	CINEOS	EOS	2.0 km	MPC · JPL
514627	2004 SQ_{23}	—	September 17, 2004	Kitt Peak	Spacewatch	MAS	700 m	MPC · JPL
514628	2004 TG_{3}	—	October 4, 2004	Kitt Peak	Spacewatch	·	2.2 km	MPC · JPL
514629	2004 TR_{36}	—	September 22, 2004	Kitt Peak	Spacewatch	PHO	770 m	MPC · JPL
514630	2004 TC_{62}	—	October 5, 2004	Anderson Mesa	LONEOS	V	750 m	MPC · JPL
514631	2004 TQ_{154}	—	September 22, 2004	Kitt Peak	Spacewatch	ELF	2.9 km	MPC · JPL
514632	2004 TM_{198}	—	October 7, 2004	Kitt Peak	Spacewatch	THM	2.3 km	MPC · JPL
514633	2004 TD_{213}	—	October 8, 2004	Kitt Peak	Spacewatch	·	2.6 km	MPC · JPL
514634	2004 TD_{233}	—	October 4, 2004	Kitt Peak	Spacewatch	·	2.8 km	MPC · JPL
514635	2004 TR_{243}	—	October 6, 2004	Kitt Peak	Spacewatch	HYG	2.5 km	MPC · JPL
514636	2004 TA_{281}	—	October 10, 2004	Kitt Peak	Spacewatch	·	1.4 km	MPC · JPL
514637	2004 VD_{47}	—	November 4, 2004	Kitt Peak	Spacewatch	(5)	1.1 km	MPC · JPL
514638	2004 XP_{148}	—	December 13, 2004	Campo Imperatore	CINEOS	·	940 m	MPC · JPL
514639	2004 XY_{177}	—	December 12, 2004	Kitt Peak	Spacewatch	·	1.3 km	MPC · JPL
514640	2005 EH_{65}	—	March 4, 2005	Mount Lemmon	Mount Lemmon Survey	JUN	990 m	MPC · JPL
514641	2005 ES_{199}	—	March 12, 2005	Kitt Peak	Spacewatch	·	1.6 km	MPC · JPL
514642	2005 GD_{40}	—	April 4, 2005	Mount Lemmon	Mount Lemmon Survey	·	1.4 km	MPC · JPL
514643	2005 GE_{86}	—	April 1, 2005	Kitt Peak	Spacewatch	·	620 m	MPC · JPL
514644	2005 GS_{106}	—	April 10, 2005	Mount Lemmon	Mount Lemmon Survey	·	1.1 km	MPC · JPL
514645	2005 JD_{70}	—	May 7, 2005	Kitt Peak	Spacewatch	·	1.6 km	MPC · JPL
514646	2005 LK_{27}	—	April 30, 2005	Kitt Peak	Spacewatch	·	660 m	MPC · JPL
514647	2005 MT_{48}	—	June 29, 2005	Kitt Peak	Spacewatch	·	580 m	MPC · JPL
514648	2005 NN_{70}	—	June 13, 2005	Mount Lemmon	Mount Lemmon Survey	·	610 m	MPC · JPL
514649	2005 QW_{180}	—	August 29, 2005	Kitt Peak	Spacewatch	·	2.5 km	MPC · JPL
514650	2005 RK_{15}	—	September 1, 2005	Kitt Peak	Spacewatch	·	1.5 km	MPC · JPL
514651	2005 ST_{27}	—	September 23, 2005	Kitt Peak	Spacewatch	·	1.1 km	MPC · JPL
514652	2005 SC_{71}	—	September 30, 2005	Palomar	NEAT	AMO	740 m	MPC · JPL
514653	2005 SM_{93}	—	September 24, 2005	Kitt Peak	Spacewatch	·	2.4 km	MPC · JPL
514654	2005 SN_{113}	—	September 27, 2005	Kitt Peak	Spacewatch	·	1.5 km	MPC · JPL
514655	2005 SN_{147}	—	September 25, 2005	Kitt Peak	Spacewatch	V	610 m	MPC · JPL
514656	2005 SP_{174}	—	September 29, 2005	Kitt Peak	Spacewatch	·	840 m	MPC · JPL
514657	2005 SO_{227}	—	September 30, 2005	Kitt Peak	Spacewatch	·	770 m	MPC · JPL
514658	2005 SJ_{280}	—	September 25, 2005	Kitt Peak	Spacewatch	·	790 m	MPC · JPL
514659	2005 TH_{34}	—	September 25, 2005	Kitt Peak	Spacewatch	·	970 m	MPC · JPL
514660	2005 TD_{132}	—	October 7, 2005	Kitt Peak	Spacewatch	·	880 m	MPC · JPL
514661	2005 TS_{168}	—	September 24, 2005	Kitt Peak	Spacewatch	·	1.0 km	MPC · JPL
514662	2005 UE_{14}	—	September 29, 2005	Kitt Peak	Spacewatch	·	2.6 km	MPC · JPL
514663	2005 UN_{35}	—	October 24, 2005	Kitt Peak	Spacewatch	·	1.9 km	MPC · JPL
514664	2005 UE_{86}	—	October 22, 2005	Kitt Peak	Spacewatch	·	910 m	MPC · JPL
514665	2005 UZ_{93}	—	October 22, 2005	Kitt Peak	Spacewatch	HYG	2.1 km	MPC · JPL
514666	2005 UZ_{262}	—	October 1, 2005	Kitt Peak	Spacewatch	3:2	4.8 km	MPC · JPL
514667	2005 UN_{267}	—	October 27, 2005	Kitt Peak	Spacewatch	·	1.1 km	MPC · JPL
514668	2005 UG_{271}	—	October 28, 2005	Catalina	CSS	·	1.2 km	MPC · JPL
514669	2005 UN_{282}	—	October 26, 2005	Kitt Peak	Spacewatch	·	900 m	MPC · JPL
514670	2005 UT_{305}	—	October 12, 2005	Kitt Peak	Spacewatch	NYS	820 m	MPC · JPL
514671	2005 UA_{318}	—	September 30, 2005	Mount Lemmon	Mount Lemmon Survey	·	1.8 km	MPC · JPL
514672	2005 UX_{332}	—	October 29, 2005	Mount Lemmon	Mount Lemmon Survey	·	820 m	MPC · JPL
514673	2005 UR_{343}	—	October 29, 2005	Kitt Peak	Spacewatch	EOS	1.4 km	MPC · JPL
514674	2005 UE_{369}	—	October 27, 2005	Kitt Peak	Spacewatch	·	1.7 km	MPC · JPL
514675	2005 UD_{522}	—	October 26, 2005	Apache Point	A. C. Becker	·	1.5 km	MPC · JPL
514676	2005 UM_{532}	—	October 29, 2005	Mount Lemmon	Mount Lemmon Survey	EOS	1.8 km	MPC · JPL
514677	2005 VX_{45}	—	November 4, 2005	Kitt Peak	Spacewatch	V	500 m	MPC · JPL
514678	2005 WM_{54}	—	September 30, 2005	Catalina	CSS	T_{j} (2.98)	2.6 km	MPC · JPL
514679	2005 WC_{75}	—	September 30, 2005	Mount Lemmon	Mount Lemmon Survey	V	530 m	MPC · JPL
514680	2005 WL_{83}	—	November 25, 2005	Mount Lemmon	Mount Lemmon Survey	EOS	2.0 km	MPC · JPL
514681	2005 WY_{110}	—	November 30, 2005	Kitt Peak	Spacewatch	EOS	3.0 km	MPC · JPL
514682	2005 WW_{138}	—	November 26, 2005	Mount Lemmon	Mount Lemmon Survey	THM	1.7 km	MPC · JPL
514683	2005 XB_{42}	—	October 26, 2005	Kitt Peak	Spacewatch	·	900 m	MPC · JPL
514684	2005 XA_{55}	—	December 5, 2005	Kitt Peak	Spacewatch	MAS	560 m	MPC · JPL
514685	2005 XF_{61}	—	December 4, 2005	Mount Lemmon	Mount Lemmon Survey	THM	1.7 km	MPC · JPL
514686	2005 YK_{21}	—	December 24, 2005	Kitt Peak	Spacewatch	·	930 m	MPC · JPL
514687	2005 YL_{25}	—	December 24, 2005	Kitt Peak	Spacewatch	THM	1.9 km	MPC · JPL
514688	2005 YD_{79}	—	December 24, 2005	Kitt Peak	Spacewatch	·	990 m	MPC · JPL
514689	2005 YE_{230}	—	November 22, 2005	Kitt Peak	Spacewatch	·	3.1 km	MPC · JPL
514690	2006 BT_{26}	—	January 4, 2006	Kitt Peak	Spacewatch	·	2.7 km	MPC · JPL
514691	2006 BC_{73}	—	January 23, 2006	Kitt Peak	Spacewatch	·	2.5 km	MPC · JPL
514692	2006 BV_{81}	—	January 23, 2006	Kitt Peak	Spacewatch	L5	9.5 km	MPC · JPL
514693	2006 BE_{108}	—	January 25, 2006	Kitt Peak	Spacewatch	·	1.1 km	MPC · JPL
514694	2006 BP_{163}	—	January 7, 2006	Mount Lemmon	Mount Lemmon Survey	·	2.9 km	MPC · JPL
514695	2006 CW_{45}	—	February 3, 2006	Kitt Peak	Spacewatch	·	1 km	MPC · JPL
514696	2006 DA_{134}	—	January 28, 2006	Kitt Peak	Spacewatch	L5	8.6 km	MPC · JPL
514697	2006 EP_{51}	—	March 4, 2006	Kitt Peak	Spacewatch	·	850 m	MPC · JPL
514698	2006 GE_{28}	—	March 25, 2006	Kitt Peak	Spacewatch	·	890 m	MPC · JPL
514699	2006 JK_{36}	—	April 19, 2006	Kitt Peak	Spacewatch	·	1.4 km	MPC · JPL
514700	2006 KX_{54}	—	May 21, 2006	Kitt Peak	Spacewatch	EUN	1.0 km	MPC · JPL

== 514701–514800 ==
back to top

Designation			Discovery			Properties		Ref
Permanent	Provisional	Named after	Date	Site	Discoverer(s)	Category	Diam.	Ref
514701	2006 KL_{113}	—	May 20, 2006	Catalina	CSS	·	1.7 km	MPC · JPL
514702	2006 MP_{6}	—	June 19, 2006	Mount Lemmon	Mount Lemmon Survey	·	780 m	MPC · JPL
514703	2006 QE_{76}	—	August 21, 2006	Kitt Peak	Spacewatch	·	1.5 km	MPC · JPL
514704	2006 QY_{84}	—	August 19, 2006	Kitt Peak	Spacewatch	·	1.4 km	MPC · JPL
514705	2006 RU_{11}	—	August 27, 2006	Anderson Mesa	LONEOS	·	1.6 km	MPC · JPL
514706	2006 SX_{17}	—	September 17, 2006	Kitt Peak	Spacewatch	526	2.0 km	MPC · JPL
514707	2006 SM_{41}	—	September 18, 2006	Kitt Peak	Spacewatch	·	1.6 km	MPC · JPL
514708	2006 SU_{136}	—	September 20, 2006	Catalina	CSS	·	1.8 km	MPC · JPL
514709	2006 SP_{221}	—	August 28, 2006	Kitt Peak	Spacewatch	·	490 m	MPC · JPL
514710	2006 SB_{230}	—	September 17, 2006	Kitt Peak	Spacewatch	·	1.6 km	MPC · JPL
514711	2006 SY_{256}	—	September 26, 2006	Kitt Peak	Spacewatch	·	1.5 km	MPC · JPL
514712	2006 SY_{288}	—	September 19, 2006	Catalina	CSS	·	1.9 km	MPC · JPL
514713	2006 SU_{333}	—	September 28, 2006	Kitt Peak	Spacewatch	·	1.9 km	MPC · JPL
514714	2006 SG_{361}	—	September 30, 2006	Mount Lemmon	Mount Lemmon Survey	·	630 m	MPC · JPL
514715	2006 TZ_{88}	—	October 13, 2006	Kitt Peak	Spacewatch	·	1.6 km	MPC · JPL
514716	2006 UK_{130}	—	October 19, 2006	Kitt Peak	Spacewatch	·	1.7 km	MPC · JPL
514717	2006 UE_{134}	—	October 19, 2006	Kitt Peak	Spacewatch	·	1.2 km	MPC · JPL
514718	2006 UM_{168}	—	October 2, 2006	Mount Lemmon	Mount Lemmon Survey	·	1.9 km	MPC · JPL
514719	2006 UH_{178}	—	October 16, 2006	Catalina	CSS	·	2.1 km	MPC · JPL
514720	2006 UX_{272}	—	October 4, 2006	Mount Lemmon	Mount Lemmon Survey	·	1.9 km	MPC · JPL
514721	2006 UU_{335}	—	October 19, 2006	Kitt Peak	Spacewatch	·	610 m	MPC · JPL
514722	2006 VL_{6}	—	November 10, 2006	Kitt Peak	Spacewatch	BRA	1.4 km	MPC · JPL
514723	2006 VR_{47}	—	October 21, 2006	Catalina	CSS	H	490 m	MPC · JPL
514724	2006 VL_{67}	—	October 21, 2006	Mount Lemmon	Mount Lemmon Survey	·	740 m	MPC · JPL
514725	2006 VE_{83}	—	October 31, 2006	Mount Lemmon	Mount Lemmon Survey	·	1.9 km	MPC · JPL
514726	2006 VQ_{104}	—	September 30, 2006	Catalina	CSS	·	2.6 km	MPC · JPL
514727	2006 WK_{36}	—	November 16, 2006	Kitt Peak	Spacewatch	·	670 m	MPC · JPL
514728	2006 WV_{113}	—	October 4, 2006	Mount Lemmon	Mount Lemmon Survey	·	1.5 km	MPC · JPL
514729	2006 WZ_{181}	—	November 15, 2006	Catalina	CSS	·	680 m	MPC · JPL
514730	2006 WM_{200}	—	November 19, 2006	Kitt Peak	Spacewatch	KOR	1.1 km	MPC · JPL
514731	2006 XR_{51}	—	November 11, 2006	Kitt Peak	Spacewatch	·	650 m	MPC · JPL
514732	2006 YG_{55}	—	December 21, 2006	Kitt Peak	Spacewatch	·	1.4 km	MPC · JPL
514733	2007 AY_{30}	—	January 9, 2007	Mount Lemmon	Mount Lemmon Survey	EMA	4.1 km	MPC · JPL
514734	2007 BJ_{41}	—	January 24, 2007	Mount Lemmon	Mount Lemmon Survey	·	1.7 km	MPC · JPL
514735	2007 BP_{47}	—	January 17, 2007	Kitt Peak	Spacewatch	·	2.7 km	MPC · JPL
514736	2007 BV_{68}	—	January 27, 2007	Mount Lemmon	Mount Lemmon Survey	·	2.0 km	MPC · JPL
514737	2007 BL_{100}	—	January 17, 2007	Kitt Peak	Spacewatch	·	1.9 km	MPC · JPL
514738	2007 CQ_{12}	—	December 27, 2006	Mount Lemmon	Mount Lemmon Survey	·	790 m	MPC · JPL
514739	2007 CP_{29}	—	January 25, 2007	Kitt Peak	Spacewatch	·	1.9 km	MPC · JPL
514740	2007 CT_{33}	—	February 6, 2007	Mount Lemmon	Mount Lemmon Survey	MAS	590 m	MPC · JPL
514741	2007 CD_{37}	—	February 6, 2007	Mount Lemmon	Mount Lemmon Survey	·	1.9 km	MPC · JPL
514742	2007 CA_{52}	—	January 28, 2007	Catalina	CSS	·	2.3 km	MPC · JPL
514743	2007 CS_{70}	—	February 14, 2007	Mauna Kea	Mauna Kea	EMA	2.3 km	MPC · JPL
514744	2007 DX_{1}	—	February 16, 2007	Mount Lemmon	Mount Lemmon Survey	·	2.9 km	MPC · JPL
514745	2007 DD_{42}	—	January 27, 2007	Kitt Peak	Spacewatch	·	1.3 km	MPC · JPL
514746	2007 DE_{44}	—	February 17, 2007	Mount Lemmon	Mount Lemmon Survey	·	2.2 km	MPC · JPL
514747	2007 DQ_{76}	—	February 22, 2007	Kitt Peak	Spacewatch	H	490 m	MPC · JPL
514748	2007 DR_{85}	—	February 21, 2007	Mount Lemmon	Mount Lemmon Survey	·	1.9 km	MPC · JPL
514749	2007 DS_{111}	—	February 25, 2007	Kitt Peak	Spacewatch	URS	2.9 km	MPC · JPL
514750	2007 DS_{113}	—	February 22, 2007	Kitt Peak	Spacewatch	V	460 m	MPC · JPL
514751	2007 DP_{118}	—	February 25, 2007	Mount Lemmon	Mount Lemmon Survey	·	2.2 km	MPC · JPL
514752	2007 EE_{7}	—	February 21, 2007	Mount Lemmon	Mount Lemmon Survey	·	2.2 km	MPC · JPL
514753	2007 EJ_{17}	—	March 9, 2007	Mount Lemmon	Mount Lemmon Survey	MAS	640 m	MPC · JPL
514754	2007 EX_{22}	—	January 27, 2007	Mount Lemmon	Mount Lemmon Survey	·	1.8 km	MPC · JPL
514755	2007 EH_{37}	—	February 27, 2007	Kitt Peak	Spacewatch	·	1.3 km	MPC · JPL
514756	2007 EK_{39}	—	March 13, 2007	Mount Lemmon	Mount Lemmon Survey	·	450 m	MPC · JPL
514757	2007 EJ_{50}	—	March 10, 2007	Mount Lemmon	Mount Lemmon Survey	·	2.1 km	MPC · JPL
514758	2007 EH_{55}	—	February 26, 2007	Mount Lemmon	Mount Lemmon Survey	·	3.1 km	MPC · JPL
514759	2007 ET_{64}	—	February 25, 2007	Mount Lemmon	Mount Lemmon Survey	·	2.3 km	MPC · JPL
514760	2007 EA_{66}	—	March 10, 2007	Kitt Peak	Spacewatch	THM	2.0 km	MPC · JPL
514761	2007 EV_{94}	—	March 10, 2007	Mount Lemmon	Mount Lemmon Survey	H	390 m	MPC · JPL
514762	2007 EH_{99}	—	March 11, 2007	Kitt Peak	Spacewatch	L5	12 km	MPC · JPL
514763	2007 EB_{114}	—	February 9, 2007	Kitt Peak	Spacewatch	AEG	2.6 km	MPC · JPL
514764	2007 EV_{114}	—	March 13, 2007	Mount Lemmon	Mount Lemmon Survey	PHO	680 m	MPC · JPL
514765	2007 EL_{115}	—	March 13, 2007	Mount Lemmon	Mount Lemmon Survey	·	2.8 km	MPC · JPL
514766	2007 EY_{124}	—	March 14, 2007	Kitt Peak	Spacewatch	·	2.0 km	MPC · JPL
514767	2007 EL_{126}	—	March 9, 2007	Kitt Peak	Spacewatch	·	640 m	MPC · JPL
514768	2007 ET_{137}	—	March 11, 2007	Kitt Peak	Spacewatch	·	2.4 km	MPC · JPL
514769	2007 EG_{183}	—	January 27, 2007	Mount Lemmon	Mount Lemmon Survey	·	1.8 km	MPC · JPL
514770	2007 EO_{183}	—	February 21, 2007	Kitt Peak	Spacewatch	·	1.8 km	MPC · JPL
514771	2007 ER_{225}	—	March 9, 2007	Kitt Peak	Spacewatch	L5	9.0 km	MPC · JPL
514772	2007 ET_{225}	—	January 28, 2007	Mount Lemmon	Mount Lemmon Survey	L5	7.6 km	MPC · JPL
514773	2007 FW_{37}	—	February 25, 2007	Mount Lemmon	Mount Lemmon Survey	NYS	850 m	MPC · JPL
514774	2007 FR_{44}	—	March 20, 2007	Mount Lemmon	Mount Lemmon Survey	MAS	540 m	MPC · JPL
514775	2007 FL_{45}	—	March 26, 2007	Mount Lemmon	Mount Lemmon Survey	·	960 m	MPC · JPL
514776	2007 FU_{45}	—	March 16, 2007	Mount Lemmon	Mount Lemmon Survey	·	770 m	MPC · JPL
514777	2007 GO	—	April 7, 2007	Mount Lemmon	Mount Lemmon Survey	MAS	670 m	MPC · JPL
514778	2007 GL_{5}	—	March 11, 2007	Kitt Peak	Spacewatch	L5	9.6 km	MPC · JPL
514779	2007 GG_{16}	—	April 11, 2007	Kitt Peak	Spacewatch	·	1 km	MPC · JPL
514780	2007 GL_{18}	—	April 11, 2007	Catalina	CSS	PHO	1.1 km	MPC · JPL
514781	2007 GS_{18}	—	April 11, 2007	Kitt Peak	Spacewatch	NYS	910 m	MPC · JPL
514782	2007 GC_{40}	—	March 15, 2007	Mount Lemmon	Mount Lemmon Survey	·	970 m	MPC · JPL
514783	2007 GQ_{54}	—	April 15, 2007	Kitt Peak	Spacewatch	·	2.9 km	MPC · JPL
514784	2007 GP_{70}	—	March 20, 2007	Kitt Peak	Spacewatch	MAS	550 m	MPC · JPL
514785	2007 GX_{70}	—	March 18, 2007	Kitt Peak	Spacewatch	·	3.0 km	MPC · JPL
514786	2007 HS_{30}	—	March 17, 2007	Kitt Peak	Spacewatch	·	880 m	MPC · JPL
514787	2007 HV_{83}	—	April 25, 2007	Kitt Peak	Spacewatch	NYS	1.0 km	MPC · JPL
514788	2007 HM_{85}	—	April 24, 2007	Kitt Peak	Spacewatch	·	2.1 km	MPC · JPL
514789	2007 JU_{18}	—	May 9, 2007	Kitt Peak	Spacewatch	·	960 m	MPC · JPL
514790	2007 JK_{30}	—	May 11, 2007	Mount Lemmon	Mount Lemmon Survey	·	840 m	MPC · JPL
514791	2007 JH_{34}	—	April 25, 2007	Kitt Peak	Spacewatch	·	1.1 km	MPC · JPL
514792	2007 LK_{32}	—	April 19, 2007	Mount Lemmon	Mount Lemmon Survey	·	2.9 km	MPC · JPL
514793	2007 MW_{6}	—	June 18, 2007	Kitt Peak	Spacewatch	·	2.6 km	MPC · JPL
514794	2007 MY_{10}	—	June 21, 2007	Mount Lemmon	Mount Lemmon Survey	·	1.3 km	MPC · JPL
514795	2007 NP_{4}	—	June 10, 2007	Siding Spring	SSS	·	1.9 km	MPC · JPL
514796	2007 PY_{42}	—	August 9, 2007	Kitt Peak	Spacewatch	·	1.7 km	MPC · JPL
514797	2007 PS_{49}	—	August 10, 2007	Kitt Peak	Spacewatch	·	1.2 km	MPC · JPL
514798	2007 RG_{113}	—	September 11, 2007	Kitt Peak	Spacewatch	·	750 m	MPC · JPL
514799	2007 RJ_{221}	—	September 14, 2007	Mount Lemmon	Mount Lemmon Survey	EUN	880 m	MPC · JPL
514800	2007 RE_{241}	—	September 10, 2007	Catalina	CSS	BAR	1.3 km	MPC · JPL

== 514801–514900 ==
back to top

Designation			Discovery			Properties		Ref
Permanent	Provisional	Named after	Date	Site	Discoverer(s)	Category	Diam.	Ref
514801	2007 RV_{247}	—	September 13, 2007	Mount Lemmon	Mount Lemmon Survey	·	1.4 km	MPC · JPL
514802	2007 RP_{253}	—	September 14, 2007	Kitt Peak	Spacewatch	·	1.2 km	MPC · JPL
514803	2007 RL_{285}	—	September 13, 2007	Mount Lemmon	Mount Lemmon Survey	·	1.1 km	MPC · JPL
514804	2007 RD_{298}	—	September 9, 2007	Kitt Peak	Spacewatch	·	1.3 km	MPC · JPL
514805	2007 RU_{308}	—	September 15, 2007	Kitt Peak	Spacewatch	·	1.2 km	MPC · JPL
514806	2007 SV_{3}	—	September 16, 2007	Socorro	LINEAR	·	2.0 km	MPC · JPL
514807	2007 SP_{21}	—	October 6, 2007	Socorro	LINEAR	·	1.6 km	MPC · JPL
514808	2007 TK_{145}	—	September 8, 2007	Mount Lemmon	Mount Lemmon Survey	·	1.8 km	MPC · JPL
514809	2007 TF_{245}	—	October 8, 2007	Catalina	CSS	ADE	2.0 km	MPC · JPL
514810	2007 TO_{266}	—	March 11, 1996	Kitt Peak	Spacewatch	·	1.4 km	MPC · JPL
514811	2007 TE_{280}	—	October 13, 2007	Mount Lemmon	Mount Lemmon Survey	T_{j} (2.88) · CYB	3.7 km	MPC · JPL
514812	2007 TJ_{311}	—	October 11, 2007	Catalina	CSS	·	1.4 km	MPC · JPL
514813	2007 TQ_{386}	—	October 15, 2007	Kitt Peak	Spacewatch	·	1.5 km	MPC · JPL
514814	2007 TM_{420}	—	October 9, 2007	Catalina	CSS	·	1.8 km	MPC · JPL
514815	2007 TA_{436}	—	October 15, 2007	Mount Lemmon	Mount Lemmon Survey	·	1.8 km	MPC · JPL
514816	2007 TH_{439}	—	October 12, 2007	Mount Lemmon	Mount Lemmon Survey	MRX	740 m	MPC · JPL
514817	2007 UE_{94}	—	October 15, 2007	Kitt Peak	Spacewatch	·	1.4 km	MPC · JPL
514818	2007 UA_{141}	—	October 21, 2007	Mount Lemmon	Mount Lemmon Survey	·	1.2 km	MPC · JPL
514819	2007 VY_{1}	—	October 12, 2007	Anderson Mesa	LONEOS	DOR	2.1 km	MPC · JPL
514820	2007 VB_{116}	—	November 3, 2007	Kitt Peak	Spacewatch	·	1.7 km	MPC · JPL
514821	2007 VZ_{179}	—	October 12, 2007	Kitt Peak	Spacewatch	WIT	670 m	MPC · JPL
514822	2007 VX_{225}	—	April 10, 2005	Mount Lemmon	Mount Lemmon Survey	·	1.3 km	MPC · JPL
514823	2007 VB_{242}	—	November 12, 2007	Catalina	CSS	·	1.7 km	MPC · JPL
514824	2007 VD_{338}	—	November 7, 2007	Mount Lemmon	Mount Lemmon Survey	·	2.4 km	MPC · JPL
514825	2007 WW_{61}	—	November 17, 2007	Kitt Peak	Spacewatch	·	2.2 km	MPC · JPL
514826	2007 XS_{54}	—	November 5, 2007	Mount Lemmon	Mount Lemmon Survey	MRX	970 m	MPC · JPL
514827	2008 AK_{18}	—	December 30, 2007	Kitt Peak	Spacewatch	·	500 m	MPC · JPL
514828	2008 AS_{25}	—	November 19, 2007	Mount Lemmon	Mount Lemmon Survey	BRA	1.3 km	MPC · JPL
514829	2008 AQ_{54}	—	January 11, 2008	Kitt Peak	Spacewatch	·	1.6 km	MPC · JPL
514830	2008 AO_{58}	—	December 31, 2007	Kitt Peak	Spacewatch	·	1.7 km	MPC · JPL
514831	2008 AY_{115}	—	January 11, 2008	Kitt Peak	Spacewatch	·	1.6 km	MPC · JPL
514832	2008 CG_{18}	—	February 3, 2008	Kitt Peak	Spacewatch	H	420 m	MPC · JPL
514833	2008 CF_{34}	—	February 2, 2008	Kitt Peak	Spacewatch	·	1.6 km	MPC · JPL
514834	2008 CB_{38}	—	January 16, 2008	Kitt Peak	Spacewatch	·	1.6 km	MPC · JPL
514835	2008 CO_{91}	—	February 8, 2008	Kitt Peak	Spacewatch	·	470 m	MPC · JPL
514836	2008 CT_{127}	—	February 8, 2008	Kitt Peak	Spacewatch	KOR	1.1 km	MPC · JPL
514837	2008 CR_{138}	—	February 8, 2008	Kitt Peak	Spacewatch	·	610 m	MPC · JPL
514838	2008 CG_{142}	—	February 8, 2008	Kitt Peak	Spacewatch	·	630 m	MPC · JPL
514839	2008 CN_{159}	—	February 2, 2008	Kitt Peak	Spacewatch	·	610 m	MPC · JPL
514840	2008 CY_{193}	—	February 8, 2008	Mount Lemmon	Mount Lemmon Survey	·	1.9 km	MPC · JPL
514841	2008 DL_{15}	—	February 12, 2008	Mount Lemmon	Mount Lemmon Survey	PHO	710 m	MPC · JPL
514842	2008 DV_{17}	—	February 26, 2008	Mount Lemmon	Mount Lemmon Survey	·	1.9 km	MPC · JPL
514843	2008 DE_{37}	—	February 27, 2008	Kitt Peak	Spacewatch	PHO	790 m	MPC · JPL
514844	2008 DN_{60}	—	February 28, 2008	Mount Lemmon	Mount Lemmon Survey	·	450 m	MPC · JPL
514845	2008 EB_{7}	—	February 1, 2008	Kitt Peak	Spacewatch	·	1.7 km	MPC · JPL
514846	2008 EQ_{7}	—	March 6, 2008	Catalina	CSS	AMO	110 m	MPC · JPL
514847	2008 EM_{12}	—	February 10, 2008	Kitt Peak	Spacewatch	·	1.6 km	MPC · JPL
514848	2008 EA_{14}	—	March 1, 2008	Kitt Peak	Spacewatch	·	660 m	MPC · JPL
514849	2008 EU_{67}	—	February 29, 2008	Mount Lemmon	Mount Lemmon Survey	·	1.8 km	MPC · JPL
514850	2008 EN_{99}	—	March 5, 2008	Catalina	CSS	H	360 m	MPC · JPL
514851	2008 EK_{150}	—	March 10, 2008	Kitt Peak	Spacewatch	·	390 m	MPC · JPL
514852	2008 EB_{153}	—	March 11, 2008	Mount Lemmon	Mount Lemmon Survey	V	450 m	MPC · JPL
514853	2008 EA_{154}	—	March 15, 2008	Kitt Peak	Spacewatch	·	1.7 km	MPC · JPL
514854	2008 EV_{164}	—	March 1, 2008	Kitt Peak	Spacewatch	·	1.5 km	MPC · JPL
514855	2008 FS_{13}	—	August 29, 2006	Catalina	CSS	·	660 m	MPC · JPL
514856	2008 FA_{21}	—	March 27, 2008	Kitt Peak	Spacewatch	·	2.1 km	MPC · JPL
514857	2008 FH_{56}	—	March 13, 2008	Kitt Peak	Spacewatch	·	570 m	MPC · JPL
514858	2008 FL_{65}	—	March 28, 2008	Kitt Peak	Spacewatch	·	580 m	MPC · JPL
514859	2008 FB_{73}	—	March 10, 2008	Mount Lemmon	Mount Lemmon Survey	·	530 m	MPC · JPL
514860	2008 FT_{121}	—	March 31, 2008	Mount Lemmon	Mount Lemmon Survey	·	1.7 km	MPC · JPL
514861	2008 FC_{127}	—	March 30, 2008	Kitt Peak	Spacewatch	AEG	2.4 km	MPC · JPL
514862	2008 FX_{131}	—	March 28, 2008	Mount Lemmon	Mount Lemmon Survey	·	2.0 km	MPC · JPL
514863	2008 GE_{49}	—	April 5, 2008	Kitt Peak	Spacewatch	·	1.5 km	MPC · JPL
514864	2008 GP_{51}	—	March 28, 2008	Mount Lemmon	Mount Lemmon Survey	·	1.3 km	MPC · JPL
514865	2008 GV_{72}	—	March 12, 2008	Kitt Peak	Spacewatch	·	1.5 km	MPC · JPL
514866	2008 GU_{92}	—	April 6, 2008	Mount Lemmon	Mount Lemmon Survey	PHO	830 m	MPC · JPL
514867	2008 GF_{131}	—	April 7, 2008	Kitt Peak	Spacewatch	·	1.6 km	MPC · JPL
514868	2008 GT_{133}	—	April 8, 2008	Kitt Peak	Spacewatch	·	850 m	MPC · JPL
514869	2008 GV_{133}	—	April 13, 2008	Mount Lemmon	Mount Lemmon Survey	L5	8.8 km	MPC · JPL
514870	2008 GX_{133}	—	April 3, 2008	Mount Lemmon	Mount Lemmon Survey	·	1.9 km	MPC · JPL
514871	2008 GT_{141}	—	April 14, 2008	Mount Lemmon	Mount Lemmon Survey	L5	8.0 km	MPC · JPL
514872	2008 HF_{1}	—	April 11, 2008	Mount Lemmon	Mount Lemmon Survey	·	1.7 km	MPC · JPL
514873	2008 HK_{22}	—	April 26, 2008	Kitt Peak	Spacewatch	·	2.0 km	MPC · JPL
514874	2008 HR_{27}	—	April 9, 2008	Kitt Peak	Spacewatch	·	610 m	MPC · JPL
514875	2008 HB_{33}	—	April 29, 2008	Mount Lemmon	Mount Lemmon Survey	L5	7.6 km	MPC · JPL
514876	2008 HS_{43}	—	April 27, 2008	Mount Lemmon	Mount Lemmon Survey	·	2.9 km	MPC · JPL
514877	2008 HR_{47}	—	April 4, 2008	Kitt Peak	Spacewatch	·	430 m	MPC · JPL
514878	2008 HP_{58}	—	April 30, 2008	Mount Lemmon	Mount Lemmon Survey	·	1.0 km	MPC · JPL
514879	2008 JR_{23}	—	November 29, 2005	Kitt Peak	Spacewatch	·	2.8 km	MPC · JPL
514880	2008 JD_{28}	—	April 30, 2008	Kitt Peak	Spacewatch	·	570 m	MPC · JPL
514881	2008 KH_{14}	—	May 27, 2008	Kitt Peak	Spacewatch	·	2.2 km	MPC · JPL
514882	2008 KQ_{16}	—	May 3, 2008	Kitt Peak	Spacewatch	L5	8.2 km	MPC · JPL
514883	2008 KG_{27}	—	April 8, 2008	Kitt Peak	Spacewatch	·	530 m	MPC · JPL
514884	2008 LD_{7}	—	April 30, 2008	Mount Lemmon	Mount Lemmon Survey	·	1.4 km	MPC · JPL
514885	2008 LR_{7}	—	May 27, 2008	Kitt Peak	Spacewatch	·	1.8 km	MPC · JPL
514886	2008 MJ	—	April 29, 2008	Mount Lemmon	Mount Lemmon Survey	·	1.7 km	MPC · JPL
514887	2008 QO_{1}	—	August 23, 2008	La Sagra	OAM	NYS	1.2 km	MPC · JPL
514888	2008 QA_{10}	—	August 26, 2008	La Sagra	OAM	NYS	870 m	MPC · JPL
514889	2008 QH_{26}	—	August 29, 2008	La Sagra	OAM	·	1.2 km	MPC · JPL
514890	2008 RQ_{3}	—	September 2, 2008	Kitt Peak	Spacewatch	·	1.2 km	MPC · JPL
514891	2008 RU_{21}	—	September 2, 2008	La Sagra	OAM	V	780 m	MPC · JPL
514892	2008 RC_{96}	—	September 7, 2008	Catalina	CSS	·	1.0 km	MPC · JPL
514893	2008 RE_{110}	—	September 3, 2008	Kitt Peak	Spacewatch	CYB	3.8 km	MPC · JPL
514894	2008 RO_{111}	—	September 4, 2008	Kitt Peak	Spacewatch	NYS	1.1 km	MPC · JPL
514895	2008 RU_{115}	—	September 7, 2008	Mount Lemmon	Mount Lemmon Survey	NYS	970 m	MPC · JPL
514896	2008 RS_{140}	—	September 9, 2008	Mount Lemmon	Mount Lemmon Survey	NYS	1.1 km	MPC · JPL
514897	2008 SB_{7}	—	September 6, 2008	Mount Lemmon	Mount Lemmon Survey	·	1.5 km	MPC · JPL
514898	2008 SH_{10}	—	September 2, 2008	Kitt Peak	Spacewatch	·	3.2 km	MPC · JPL
514899	2008 SJ_{12}	—	September 21, 2008	Kitt Peak	Spacewatch	(5)	860 m	MPC · JPL
514900	2008 SC_{47}	—	September 20, 2008	Kitt Peak	Spacewatch	H	430 m	MPC · JPL

== 514901–515000 ==
back to top

Designation			Discovery			Properties		Ref
Permanent	Provisional	Named after	Date	Site	Discoverer(s)	Category	Diam.	Ref
514901	2008 SS_{70}	—	August 29, 2008	La Sagra	OAM	V	670 m	MPC · JPL
514902	2008 SR_{88}	—	September 6, 2008	Mount Lemmon	Mount Lemmon Survey	H	530 m	MPC · JPL
514903	2008 SA_{135}	—	September 23, 2008	Mount Lemmon	Mount Lemmon Survey	·	5.2 km	MPC · JPL
514904	2008 SY_{145}	—	September 22, 2008	Mount Lemmon	Mount Lemmon Survey	NYS	1.1 km	MPC · JPL
514905	2008 SS_{205}	—	September 26, 2008	Kitt Peak	Spacewatch	·	950 m	MPC · JPL
514906	2008 SJ_{211}	—	September 28, 2008	Mount Lemmon	Mount Lemmon Survey	T_{j} (2.98) · 3:2	3.6 km	MPC · JPL
514907	2008 SJ_{225}	—	September 26, 2008	Kitt Peak	Spacewatch	·	870 m	MPC · JPL
514908	2008 SU_{226}	—	September 28, 2008	Mount Lemmon	Mount Lemmon Survey	H	410 m	MPC · JPL
514909	2008 SY_{235}	—	September 7, 2008	Mount Lemmon	Mount Lemmon Survey	·	1.1 km	MPC · JPL
514910	2008 ST_{281}	—	September 23, 2008	Mount Lemmon	Mount Lemmon Survey	·	870 m	MPC · JPL
514911	2008 SY_{290}	—	September 23, 2008	Kitt Peak	Spacewatch	PHO	960 m	MPC · JPL
514912	2008 SY_{298}	—	September 22, 2008	Kitt Peak	Spacewatch	·	980 m	MPC · JPL
514913	2008 TD_{5}	—	October 1, 2008	La Sagra	OAM	·	1.3 km	MPC · JPL
514914	2008 TN_{26}	—	October 9, 2008	Socorro	LINEAR	APO	340 m	MPC · JPL
514915	2008 TO_{38}	—	September 23, 2008	Kitt Peak	Spacewatch	·	850 m	MPC · JPL
514916	2008 TY_{54}	—	September 24, 2008	Kitt Peak	Spacewatch	PHO	930 m	MPC · JPL
514917	2008 TX_{111}	—	October 6, 2008	Catalina	CSS	·	1.0 km	MPC · JPL
514918	2008 TC_{149}	—	September 3, 2008	Kitt Peak	Spacewatch	·	1.2 km	MPC · JPL
514919	2008 TW_{163}	—	October 1, 2008	Kitt Peak	Spacewatch	·	760 m	MPC · JPL
514920	2008 TQ_{191}	—	September 5, 2000	Anderson Mesa	LONEOS	H	640 m	MPC · JPL
514921	2008 UC_{108}	—	October 21, 2008	Kitt Peak	Spacewatch	T_{j} (2.94)	3.9 km	MPC · JPL
514922	2008 UJ_{111}	—	October 22, 2008	Kitt Peak	Spacewatch	·	930 m	MPC · JPL
514923	2008 UB_{117}	—	September 29, 2008	Mount Lemmon	Mount Lemmon Survey	V	620 m	MPC · JPL
514924	2008 UB_{122}	—	October 22, 2008	Kitt Peak	Spacewatch	CYB	3.6 km	MPC · JPL
514925	2008 UJ_{135}	—	September 24, 2008	Mount Lemmon	Mount Lemmon Survey	PHO	1.0 km	MPC · JPL
514926	2008 UT_{143}	—	October 23, 2008	Kitt Peak	Spacewatch	3:2 · SHU	4.2 km	MPC · JPL
514927	2008 US_{166}	—	October 6, 2008	Mount Lemmon	Mount Lemmon Survey	·	1.4 km	MPC · JPL
514928	2008 US_{185}	—	September 27, 2008	Mount Lemmon	Mount Lemmon Survey	·	1.4 km	MPC · JPL
514929	2008 UX_{215}	—	October 24, 2008	Kitt Peak	Spacewatch	H	510 m	MPC · JPL
514930	2008 UH_{246}	—	October 26, 2008	Mount Lemmon	Mount Lemmon Survey	(5)	1.3 km	MPC · JPL
514931	2008 UU_{249}	—	October 27, 2008	Kitt Peak	Spacewatch	(5)	910 m	MPC · JPL
514932	2008 UC_{260}	—	October 27, 2008	Mount Lemmon	Mount Lemmon Survey	·	1.0 km	MPC · JPL
514933	2008 US_{277}	—	September 25, 2008	Kitt Peak	Spacewatch	(5)	990 m	MPC · JPL
514934	2008 UR_{304}	—	September 29, 2008	Catalina	CSS	(5)	1.0 km	MPC · JPL
514935	2008 UB_{330}	—	October 23, 2008	Kitt Peak	Spacewatch	MAR	900 m	MPC · JPL
514936	2008 UZ_{341}	—	October 28, 2008	Kitt Peak	Spacewatch	·	820 m	MPC · JPL
514937	2008 UG_{365}	—	October 6, 2008	Catalina	CSS	·	1.1 km	MPC · JPL
514938	2008 VH_{29}	—	October 21, 2008	Kitt Peak	Spacewatch	·	1.0 km	MPC · JPL
514939	2008 VS_{38}	—	November 2, 2008	Kitt Peak	Spacewatch	·	1.2 km	MPC · JPL
514940	2008 VM_{52}	—	September 23, 2008	Kitt Peak	Spacewatch	H	450 m	MPC · JPL
514941	2008 VA_{54}	—	October 20, 2008	Kitt Peak	Spacewatch	·	960 m	MPC · JPL
514942	2008 VK_{79}	—	November 22, 2008	Socorro	LINEAR	·	1.5 km	MPC · JPL
514943	2008 WN_{5}	—	October 1, 2008	Kitt Peak	Spacewatch	·	1.1 km	MPC · JPL
514944	2008 WS_{23}	—	September 22, 2008	Mount Lemmon	Mount Lemmon Survey	·	990 m	MPC · JPL
514945	2008 WB_{100}	—	October 23, 2008	Kitt Peak	Spacewatch	(5)	710 m	MPC · JPL
514946	2008 XY_{40}	—	November 20, 2008	Kitt Peak	Spacewatch	·	910 m	MPC · JPL
514947	2008 XU_{42}	—	November 22, 2008	Kitt Peak	Spacewatch	·	1.3 km	MPC · JPL
514948	2008 YG_{43}	—	November 22, 2008	Kitt Peak	Spacewatch	·	1.3 km	MPC · JPL
514949	2008 YE_{117}	—	December 29, 2008	Kitt Peak	Spacewatch	·	1.2 km	MPC · JPL
514950	2008 YO_{122}	—	December 30, 2008	Kitt Peak	Spacewatch	EUN	910 m	MPC · JPL
514951	2008 YD_{128}	—	November 24, 2008	Mount Lemmon	Mount Lemmon Survey	·	1.2 km	MPC · JPL
514952	2008 YZ_{145}	—	December 21, 2008	Kitt Peak	Spacewatch	EUN	1.2 km	MPC · JPL
514953	2008 YZ_{169}	—	December 22, 2008	Kitt Peak	Spacewatch	·	1.1 km	MPC · JPL
514954	2008 YB_{175}	—	December 30, 2008	Mount Lemmon	Mount Lemmon Survey	·	1.7 km	MPC · JPL
514955	2009 AA_{35}	—	January 15, 2009	Kitt Peak	Spacewatch	·	1.1 km	MPC · JPL
514956	2009 BC_{28}	—	December 29, 2008	Kitt Peak	Spacewatch	·	1.4 km	MPC · JPL
514957	2009 BD_{34}	—	January 16, 2009	Kitt Peak	Spacewatch	HNS	880 m	MPC · JPL
514958	2009 BP_{47}	—	December 21, 2008	Mount Lemmon	Mount Lemmon Survey	·	1.3 km	MPC · JPL
514959	2009 BC_{50}	—	January 16, 2009	Mount Lemmon	Mount Lemmon Survey	·	1.1 km	MPC · JPL
514960	2009 BT_{54}	—	January 16, 2009	Mount Lemmon	Mount Lemmon Survey	EUN	1.0 km	MPC · JPL
514961	2009 BZ_{58}	—	January 16, 2009	Mount Lemmon	Mount Lemmon Survey	MAR	800 m	MPC · JPL
514962	2009 BU_{65}	—	January 20, 2009	Kitt Peak	Spacewatch	·	1.0 km	MPC · JPL
514963	2009 BG_{98}	—	November 21, 2008	Mount Lemmon	Mount Lemmon Survey	·	1.5 km	MPC · JPL
514964	2009 BE_{128}	—	January 29, 2009	Mount Lemmon	Mount Lemmon Survey	·	1.5 km	MPC · JPL
514965	2009 BJ_{131}	—	January 31, 2009	Mount Lemmon	Mount Lemmon Survey	·	1.4 km	MPC · JPL
514966	2009 BZ_{149}	—	January 31, 2009	Kitt Peak	Spacewatch	·	1.3 km	MPC · JPL
514967	2009 BC_{171}	—	January 17, 2009	Kitt Peak	Spacewatch	·	1.3 km	MPC · JPL
514968	2009 BA_{184}	—	January 20, 2009	Catalina	CSS	·	1.3 km	MPC · JPL
514969	2009 CS_{2}	—	December 29, 2008	Mount Lemmon	Mount Lemmon Survey	·	2.2 km	MPC · JPL
514970	2009 CZ_{15}	—	February 3, 2009	Kitt Peak	Spacewatch	HNS	1.2 km	MPC · JPL
514971	2009 CH_{18}	—	January 20, 2009	Mount Lemmon	Mount Lemmon Survey	EUN	1.3 km	MPC · JPL
514972	2009 CT_{46}	—	December 29, 2008	Mount Lemmon	Mount Lemmon Survey	MIS	2.0 km	MPC · JPL
514973	2009 CH_{60}	—	February 2, 2009	Kitt Peak	Spacewatch	·	1.3 km	MPC · JPL
514974	2009 CH_{62}	—	February 3, 2009	Kitt Peak	Spacewatch	·	1.1 km	MPC · JPL
514975	2009 CZ_{66}	—	April 10, 2005	Mount Lemmon	Mount Lemmon Survey	·	1.5 km	MPC · JPL
514976	2009 DQ_{24}	—	February 21, 2009	Kitt Peak	Spacewatch	·	1.4 km	MPC · JPL
514977	2009 DJ_{25}	—	January 31, 2009	Kitt Peak	Spacewatch	·	1.2 km	MPC · JPL
514978	2009 DM_{35}	—	February 20, 2009	Kitt Peak	Spacewatch	·	1.9 km	MPC · JPL
514979	2009 DA_{52}	—	December 30, 2008	Mount Lemmon	Mount Lemmon Survey	·	1.1 km	MPC · JPL
514980	2009 DA_{60}	—	February 22, 2009	Kitt Peak	Spacewatch	EUN	1.1 km	MPC · JPL
514981	2009 DB_{85}	—	February 26, 2009	Kitt Peak	Spacewatch	·	1.6 km	MPC · JPL
514982	2009 DH_{123}	—	February 28, 2009	Kitt Peak	Spacewatch	ADE	2.1 km	MPC · JPL
514983	2009 EL_{23}	—	February 5, 2009	Mount Lemmon	Mount Lemmon Survey	·	2.0 km	MPC · JPL
514984	2009 FN_{14}	—	February 28, 2009	Kitt Peak	Spacewatch	·	1.8 km	MPC · JPL
514985	2009 FK_{28}	—	March 21, 2009	Taunus	Karge, S., R. Kling	·	1.5 km	MPC · JPL
514986 Zhangweiguo	2009 FB_{30}	Zhangweiguo	March 22, 2009	Lulin	Tsai, Y.-S.	·	1.4 km	MPC · JPL
514987	2009 FZ_{38}	—	December 30, 2008	Mount Lemmon	Mount Lemmon Survey	MAR	1.1 km	MPC · JPL
514988	2009 FR_{41}	—	March 24, 2009	Kitt Peak	Spacewatch	·	1.7 km	MPC · JPL
514989	2009 FH_{69}	—	March 17, 2009	Kitt Peak	Spacewatch	·	1.5 km	MPC · JPL
514990	2009 HY_{4}	—	March 31, 2009	Kitt Peak	Spacewatch	·	1.7 km	MPC · JPL
514991	2009 HN_{14}	—	February 28, 2009	Kitt Peak	Spacewatch	·	3.5 km	MPC · JPL
514992	2009 HH_{27}	—	February 27, 2009	Mount Lemmon	Mount Lemmon Survey	AEO	1 km	MPC · JPL
514993	2009 HR_{59}	—	April 2, 2009	Kitt Peak	Spacewatch	·	1.8 km	MPC · JPL
514994	2009 HP_{63}	—	April 22, 2009	Mount Lemmon	Mount Lemmon Survey	·	1.6 km	MPC · JPL
514995	2009 KF_{1}	—	April 2, 2009	Mount Lemmon	Mount Lemmon Survey	·	1.8 km	MPC · JPL
514996	2009 KT_{7}	—	April 20, 2009	Mount Lemmon	Mount Lemmon Survey	DOR	2.2 km	MPC · JPL
514997	2009 KP_{14}	—	April 17, 2009	Mount Lemmon	Mount Lemmon Survey	L5	7.4 km	MPC · JPL
514998	2009 KH_{28}	—	May 30, 2009	Mount Lemmon	Mount Lemmon Survey	·	1.8 km	MPC · JPL
514999	2009 ON_{14}	—	July 14, 2009	Kitt Peak	Spacewatch	T_{j} (2.98)	4.0 km	MPC · JPL
515000	2009 PC_{8}	—	August 15, 2009	Catalina	CSS	·	2.4 km	MPC · JPL

back to top

== Meaning of names ==
As minor planet discoveries are confirmed, they are given a permanent number by the IAU's Minor Planet Center (MPC), and the discoverers can then submit names for them, following the IAU's naming conventions. The list below concerns those minor planets in the specified number-range that have received names, and explains the meanings of those names.

Official naming citations of newly named small Solar System bodies are approved and published in a bulletin by IAU's Working Group for Small Bodies Nomenclature (WGSBN). Before May 2021, citations were published in MPC's Minor Planet Circulars for many decades. Recent citations can also be found on the JPL Small-Body Database (SBDB). Until his death in 2016, German astronomer Lutz D. Schmadel compiled these citations into the Dictionary of Minor Planet Names (DMP) and regularly updated the collection.

Based on Paul Herget's The Names of the Minor Planets, Schmadel also researched the unclear origin of numerous asteroids, most of which had been named prior to World War II. This article incorporates text from this source, which is in the public domain: SBDB New namings may only be added to this list below after official publication as the preannouncement of names is condemned. The WGSBN publishes a comprehensive guideline for the naming rules of non-cometary small Solar System bodies.

Named minor planet	Provisional	This minor planet was named for...	Ref · Catalog
514107 Kaʻepaokaʻāwela	2015 BZ_{509}	In the Hawaiian language, Kaʻepaokaʻāwela means the mischievous opposite-moving companion of Jupiter, evoking the image of a retrograde object of unknown origin. He hoa hōkūnaʻi ʻeʻepa no Kaʻāwela e holo ʻēkoʻa ana ma ka poe lā. Name conceived by A Hua He Inoa, ʻImiloa Astronomy Center of Hawaiʻi.	JPL · 514107
514986 Zhangweiguo	2009 FB_{30}	Zhang Weiguo (b. 1979), a Chinese amateur astronomer.	IAU · 514986
