= (6382) 1988 EL =

Hungaria asteroid

Discovery
- Discovered by: J. Alu
- Discovery site: Palomar Obs.
- Discovery date: 14 March 1988

Designations
- Alternative designations: 1983 EC_{1}
- Minor planet category: main-belt · (inner); Hungaria

Orbital characteristics
- Epoch 4 September 2017 (JD 2458000.5)
- Uncertainty parameter 0
- Observation arc: 29.01 yr (10,596 days)
- Aphelion: 1.9102 AU
- Perihelion: 1.7388 AU
- Semi-major axis: 1.8245 AU
- Eccentricity: 0.0470
- Orbital period (sidereal): 2.46 yr (900 days)
- Mean anomaly: 349.44°
- Mean motion: 0° 23^{m} 59.64^{s} / day
- Inclination: 18.556°
- Longitude of ascending node: 350.60°
- Argument of perihelion: 191.91°

Physical characteristics
- Dimensions: 4.22 km (calculated); 4.931±0.042 km 5.311±0.013 km
- Synodic rotation period: 2.892±0.005 h 2.8932±0.0005 h 2.894±0.001 h 2.895±0.002 h 2.898±0.001 h
- Geometric albedo: 0.1896±0.0604; 0.254±0.035; 0.3 (assumed)
- Spectral type: E · S
- Absolute magnitude (H): 13.8 · 14.08±0.49

(6382) 1988 EL is a stony Hungaria asteroid from the inner regions of the asteroid belt, approximately 5 kilometers in diameter. It was discovered on 14 March 1988, by American astronomer Jeffrey Alu at the U.S. Palomar Observatory, California.

== Orbit and classification ==
The presumed E-type asteroid may not be a member of the Hungaria family, which form the innermost dense concentration of asteroids in the Solar System, but an unrelated interloper, which intruded into the Hungaria orbital space, as indicated by a lower albedos from observations by the NEOWISE mission. It orbits the Sun at a distance of 1.7–1.9 AU once every 2 years and 6 months (900 days). Its orbit has an eccentricity of 0.05 and an inclination of 19° with respect to the ecliptic. The body's first yet unused observation was made at the Chinese Purple Mountain Observatory in 1983. On 13 April 2042 and on 3 October 2113, the asteroid will pass 0.086 AU (12,900,000 km) and 0.092 AU (13,800,000 km) from Mars, respectively.

== Rotation period ==
Between February 2005 and January 2015, American astronomer Brian D. Warner obtained 5 rotational lightcurves for this asteroid from photometric observations at the CS3–Palmer Divide Station in Colorado. The lightcurves gave a well-defined rotation period of 2.892–2.898 hours with a low brightness variation between 0.06 and 0.15 magnitude (U=2/3-/3/2+/3).

== Diameter and albedo ==
According to two different data sets from space-based survey carried out by the NEOWISE mission of NASA's Wide-field Infrared Survey Explorer, the asteroid measures 4.9 and 5.3 kilometers in diameter and its surface has an albedo of 0.19 and 0.25, respectively, while the Collaborative Asteroid Lightcurve Link assumes an albedo of 0.30 – a compromise value between 0.4 and 0.2, corresponding to the Hungaria asteroids as collisional family and orbital group, respectively – and calculates a smaller diameter of 4.2 kilometers, based on an absolute magnitude of 13.8.

== Naming ==
As of 2017, 1988 EL remains unnamed.
