= Jeff T. Alu =

American musician, photographer, graphic artist and amateur astronomer

Minor planets discovered: 25
see § Discovered minor planets and comets

Jeffrey (Jeff) Thomas Alu (born January 1, 1966) is an American musician, photographer, graphic artist, and amateur astronomer who has participated in the Palomar Planet-Crossing Asteroid Survey. The asteroid 4104 Alu was named in his honor.

== Discoveries ==
Alu is credited by the Minor Planet Center with the discovery of 24 minor planets, including several near-Earth asteroids as well as some in the asteroid belt. Many of these discoveries were made in collaboration with American astronomers Eleanor F. Helin and Kenneth J. Lawrence. He also co-discovered 117P/Helin–Roman–Alu and 132P/Helin–Roman–Alu, two periodic comets.

=== List of discovered minor planets ===
Co-discoveries made with ^{A} E. F. Helin and ^{B} K. J. Lawrence.

List of minor planets discovered by Jeff Alu

Name	Discovery Date	Listing
4132 Bartók	12 March 1988	list
4221 Picasso	13 March 1988	list
5230 Asahina	10 March 1988	list
5639 Ćuk	9 August 1989	list^{[A]}
(6037) 1988 EG	12 March 1988	list
6335 Nicolerappaport	5 July 1992	list^{[A]}
(6382) 1988 EL	14 March 1988	list
(6611) 1993 VW	9 November 1993	list^{[A]}
(7825) 1991 TL_{1}	10 October 1991	list
(9058) 1992 JB	1 May 1992	list^{[B]}
(10115) 1992 SK	24 September 1992	list^{[A]}
(10302) 1989 ML	29 June 1989	list^{[A]}
(11279) 1989 TC	1 October 1989	list^{[A]}
(13030) 1989 PF	9 August 1989	list^{[A]}
(15704) 1987 SE_{7}	20 September 1987	list^{[A]}
(17511) 1992 QN	29 August 1992	list^{[A]}
(26841) 1991 TY_{1}	10 October 1991	list
(27708) 1987 WP	20 November 1987	list^{[A]}
(43769) 1988 EK	10 March 1988	list
(48469) 1991 TQ_{1}	10 October 1991	list
(52307) 1991 TH_{1}	12 October 1991	list
(79186) 1993 QN	20 August 1993	list^{[A]}
(161998) 1988 PA	9 August 1988	list
(161999) 1989 RC	5 September 1989	list^{[A]}
(514568) 1994 RC	1 September 1994	list^{[A]}

== See also ==
- List of minor planet discoverers § J. Alu
