= (10115) 1992 SK =

Apollo minor planet, NEO and PHA

Discovery
- Discovered by: E. F. Helin; J. Alu
- Discovery site: Palomar Obs.
- Discovery date: 24 September 1992

Designations
- Alternative designations: 1985 SD · 1985 TO_{2}
- Minor planet category: Apollo · NEO · PHA

Orbital characteristics
- Epoch 4 September 2017 (JD 2458000.5)
- Uncertainty parameter 0
- Observation arc: 63.57 yr (23,219 days)
- Aphelion: 1.6539 AU
- Perihelion: 0.8429 AU
- Semi-major axis: 1.2484 AU
- Eccentricity: 0.3248
- Orbital period (sidereal): 1.39 yr (509 days)
- Mean anomaly: 47.505°
- Mean motion: 0° 42^{m} 23.76^{s} / day
- Inclination: 15.322°
- Longitude of ascending node: 8.9232°
- Argument of perihelion: 233.63°
- Earth MOID: 0.0449 AU · 17.5 LD

Physical characteristics
- Mean diameter: 0.90±0.20 km 0.938±0.294 km 1.000±0.085 km 1.0±0.2; 1.18 km (calculated)
- Synodic rotation period: 7.31±0.02 h 7.31832 h 7.319 h 7.323±0.005 h 7.328±0.002 h (Note: Pravec (1999) web: rotation period 7.328±0.002 hours with a brightness amplitude of 0.72 mag. Two more light-curves rendered similar periods. No quality rating by CALL. Summary figures at Collaborative Asteroid Lightcurve Link (CALL) for (10115)); 7.320232±0.000010 h
- Pole ecliptic longitude: 94°
- Pole ecliptic latitude: -56°
- Geometric albedo: 0.20 (assumed); 0.2799±0.1397; 0.318±0.214; 0.34±0.25; 0.38±0.24
- Spectral type: SMASS = S · S · S/Sq
- Absolute magnitude (H): 17.0 · 17.4

(10115) 1992 SK is a stony near-Earth object and potentially hazardous asteroid on an eccentric orbit. It belongs to the group of Apollo asteroids and measures approximately 1 kilometer (0.6 miles) in diameter. It was discovered by American astronomers Eleanor Helin and Jeff Alu at the Palomar Observatory in California on 24 September 1992.

== Classification and orbit ==
The asteroid orbits the Sun at a distance of 0.8–1.7 AU once every 17 months (509 days). Its orbit has an eccentricity of 0.32 and an inclination of 15° with respect to the ecliptic. Its Earth minimum orbit intersection distance is 0.0449 AU (6,720,000 km). This makes the body a potentially hazardous asteroid, because its MOID is less than 0.05 AU and its diameter is greater than 150 meters. The first precovery was obtained at Palomar Observatory in 1953, extending the asteroid's observation arc by 39 years prior to its discovery.

== Physical characteristics ==
In the SMASS classification, 1992 SK is characterized as a common stony S-type asteroid.

=== Rotation period ===
Several rotational lightcurves form photometric observations have been obtained for this body. In 1999, Czech astronomer Petr Pravec constructed a lightcurve, that rendered a rotation period of 7.328 hours and a brightness variation of 0.72 in magnitude (U=n/a).

In March 2006, observations by astronomer David Polishook from the ground-based Wise Observatory, Israel, gave a rotation period of 7.31 and amplitude of 0.70 mag (U=2), and in November 2011, American astronomer Brian Warner at the Palmer Divide Observatory, Colorado, obtained the first well-defined period of 7.323 hours with an amplitude of 0.50 mag (U=3).

The rotation period of 1992 SK is slowly accelerating due to the YORP effect.

=== Diameter and albedo ===
According to the surveys carried out by NASA's space-based Wide-field Infrared Survey Explorer with its subsequent NEOWISE mission, the asteroid measures 1.0 and 0.94 kilometers in diameter and its surface has an albedo of 0.28 to 0.32, respectively. The ExploreNEOs project finds an albedo of 0.34, with a diameter of 0.9 kilometers, and the Collaborative Asteroid Lightcurve Link calculates a diameter of 1.18 kilometers based on an assumed standard albedo for stony asteroids of 0.20 and an absolute magnitude of 17.0.

== Numbering and naming ==
This minor planet was numbered by the Minor Planet Center on 2 March 1999. As of 2019, it has not been named.
