= (7341) 1991 VK =

Near-Earth asteroid

(7349) 1991 VK
Discovery
- Discovered by: E. Helin; K. Lawrence
- Discovery site: Palomar Obs.
- Discovery date: 1 November 1991

Designations
- Minor planet category: Apollo NEO, PHA

Orbital characteristics
- Epoch 5 May 2025 (JD 2460800.5)
- Uncertainty parameter 0
- Observation arc: 11636 days (31.86 yr)
- Aphelion: 2.7737 AU (414.94 Gm)
- Perihelion: 0.9096 AU (136.07 Gm)
- Semi-major axis: 1.8417 AU (275.51 Gm)
- Eccentricity: 0.5061
- Orbital period (sidereal): 2.50 yr (912.87 d)
- Mean anomaly: 116.75°
- Mean motion: 0° 23^{m} 39.696^{s} / day
- Inclination: 5.41°
- Longitude of ascending node: 294.73°
- Argument of perihelion: 173.50°

Physical characteristics
- Mean diameter: 1.4 km 0.982±0.316 km
- Synodic rotation period: 4.2096 h (0.17540 d)
- Geometric albedo: 0.235±0.107
- Absolute magnitude (H): 16.7

(7341) 1991 VK is a near-Earth minor planet in the Apollo group. It was discovered by Eleanor F. Helin and Kenneth J. Lawrence at the Palomar Observatory in California on 1 November 1991. It is listed as a potentially hazardous object. Every five years (from 1946 through 2091) the asteroid makes a close approach to the Earth. The most recent close approach to Earth was on 25 January 2022 at a distance of 0.064 AU (9,600,000 km; 5,900,000 mi).

The object is suspected of displaying cometary activity.

== See also ==
- List of asteroid close approaches to Earth
- List of Earth-crossing minor planets
- List of minor planets: 7001–8000
