= (5836) 1993 MF =

Highly eccentric, stony asteroid

Discovery
- Discovered by: E. F. Helin; K. J. Lawrence
- Discovery site: Palomar Obs.
- Discovery date: 22 June 1993

Designations
- Minor planet category: Amor · NEO

Orbital characteristics
- Epoch 4 September 2017 (JD 2458000.5)
- Uncertainty parameter 0
- Observation arc: 35.90 yr (13,112 days)
- Aphelion: 3.7489 AU
- Perihelion: 1.1311 AU
- Semi-major axis: 2.4400 AU
- Eccentricity: 0.5364
- Orbital period (sidereal): 3.81 yr (1,392 days)
- Mean anomaly: 107.39°
- Mean motion: 0° 15^{m} 30.96^{s} / day
- Inclination: 7.9497°
- Longitude of ascending node: 238.78°
- Argument of perihelion: 77.974°
- Earth MOID: 0.1842 AU · 71.8 LD

Physical characteristics
- Dimensions: 2.79 km (derived); 3.8 km
- Synodic rotation period: 4.948±0.005 h (Note: Warner (2016) web: observation date: 2016-06-07. Rotation period of 4.948±0.005 hours with a brightness amplitude of 0.82 mag (U=3). Summary figures at Collaborative Asteroid Lightcurve Link (CALL) for (5836)); 4.9543±0.0002 h (Note: Pravec (1997) web: observation date: 1997-11-04. Rotation period of 4.948±0.005 hours with a brightness amplitude of 0.74 mag and an absolute magnitude of 14.65 in the R-band (U=3). Summary figures at Collaborative Asteroid Lightcurve Link (CALL) for (5836) and Pravec, P.; Wolf, M.; Sarounova, L. (1997)); 4.959 h 4.96±0.01 h
- Geometric albedo: 0.20 (assumed)
- Spectral type: SMASS = S · S
- Absolute magnitude (H): 14.65±0.2 (R) · 14.7 · 15.01±0.16 · 15.03±0.05 · 15.141±0.139 · 15.43±0.40

(5836) 1993 MF is a highly eccentric, stony asteroid, classified as a near-Earth object of the Amor group of asteroids, approximately 3 kilometers in diameter. It was discovered on 22 June 1993, by American astronomers Eleanor Helin and Kenneth Lawrence at the U.S. Palomar Observatory in California.

== Classification and orbit ==
The stony S-type asteroid orbits the Sun at a distance of 1.1–3.7 AU once every 3 years and 10 months (1,392 days). Its orbit has an eccentricity of 0.54 and an inclination of 8° with respect to the ecliptic. It has an Earth minimum orbital intersection distance of nearly 0.184 AU (27,500,000 km), which corresponds to 71.8 lunar distances. As it crosses the orbit of Mars, it may also be classified as a Mars-crosser, and, on 28 November 2023, it will pass 0.02535 AU (3,792,000 km) from the Red Planet. The first precovery was taken at the Australian Siding Spring Observatory in 1981, extending the body's observation arc by 12 years prior to its discovery.

== Physical characteristics ==
Since the 1990s, and up to June 2016, four well-defined rotational lightcurves were obtained for this asteroid from photometric observations, giving a rotation period of approximately 4.95 hours with a high brightness variation between 0.53 and 0.82 in magnitude, indicating that the asteroid has a non-spheroidal shape. In the 1990s, Italian astronomer Stefano Mottola obtained a lightcurve at La Silla during the EUNEASO, a European near-Earth object search and follow-up observation program to determine additional physical parameters (U=3).

Further lightcurves were obtained by Polish astronomer Wiesław Z. Wiśniewski at UA's LPL in October 1993, and by Czech astronomer Petr Pravec at Ondřejov Observatory in September 1997 (U=3/3). In June 2016, the fourth and most recent photometric observation was made by American astronomer Brian Warner at his Palmer Divide Station, Colorado, which gave a period of 4.948±0.005 hours with an amplitude of 0.82 in magnitude (U=3).

=== Diameter ===
While in the 1990s, Stefano Mottola estimated the asteroid to measure 3.8 kilometers in diameter (H = 15.03), the Collaborative Asteroid Lightcurve Link assumes a standard albedo for stony asteroids of 0.20 and derives a shorter diameter of 2.8 kilometers, based on an absolute magnitude of 15.14.
