= List of minor planets: 393001–394000 =

The following is a partial list of minor planets, running from minor-planet number 393001 through 394000, inclusive. The primary data for this and other partial lists is based on JPL's "Small-Body Orbital Elements" and data available from the Minor Planet Center. Critical list information is also provided by the MPC, unless otherwise specified from Lowell Observatory. A detailed description of the table's columns and additional sources are given on the main page including a complete list of every page in this series, and a statistical break-up on the dynamical classification of minor planets.

Also see the summary list of all named bodies in numerical and alphabetical order, and the corresponding naming citations for the number range of this particular list. New namings may only be added to this list after official publication, as the preannouncement of names is condemned by the Working Group for Small Bodies Nomenclature of the International Astronomical Union.

Near-Earth obj.	MBA (inner)	MBA (outer)	Centaur
Mars-crosser	MBA (middle)	Jupiter trojan	Trans-Neptunian obj.
Unclassified

== 393001–393100 ==
Designation			Discovery			Properties		Ref
Permanent	Provisional	Named after	Date	Site	Discoverer(s)	Category	Diam.	Ref
393001	2012 XL_{120}	—	March 11, 2008	Catalina	CSS	·	3.6 km	MPC · JPL
393002	2012 XW_{123}	—	March 31, 2009	Mount Lemmon	Mount Lemmon Survey	EOS	1.6 km	MPC · JPL
393003	2012 XX_{128}	—	November 17, 2007	Kitt Peak	Spacewatch	·	1.8 km	MPC · JPL
393004	2012 XT_{130}	—	January 13, 2005	Kitt Peak	Spacewatch	·	1.6 km	MPC · JPL
393005	2012 XG_{135}	—	December 1, 2005	Kitt Peak	Spacewatch	V	690 m	MPC · JPL
393006	2012 XZ_{135}	—	October 22, 2003	Kitt Peak	Spacewatch	·	1.5 km	MPC · JPL
393007	2012 XE_{136}	—	February 11, 2002	Socorro	LINEAR	V	910 m	MPC · JPL
393008	2012 XC_{138}	—	May 25, 2007	Mount Lemmon	Mount Lemmon Survey	(5)	1.3 km	MPC · JPL
393009	2012 XZ_{138}	—	January 2, 1997	Kitt Peak	Spacewatch	·	1.5 km	MPC · JPL
393010	2012 XM_{140}	—	September 11, 2007	Kitt Peak	Spacewatch	·	1.7 km	MPC · JPL
393011	2012 XB_{141}	—	October 2, 2006	Mount Lemmon	Mount Lemmon Survey	·	2.8 km	MPC · JPL
393012	2012 XP_{143}	—	March 23, 2009	Mount Lemmon	Mount Lemmon Survey	·	2.6 km	MPC · JPL
393013	2012 XG_{145}	—	March 19, 2009	Mount Lemmon	Mount Lemmon Survey	·	1.7 km	MPC · JPL
393014	2012 XT_{148}	—	October 18, 2003	Kitt Peak	Spacewatch	·	1.7 km	MPC · JPL
393015	2012 XE_{150}	—	June 21, 2007	Mount Lemmon	Mount Lemmon Survey	·	1.5 km	MPC · JPL
393016	2012 XR_{150}	—	December 30, 2008	Mount Lemmon	Mount Lemmon Survey	·	1.9 km	MPC · JPL
393017	2012 XE_{151}	—	December 16, 2007	Catalina	CSS	·	2.4 km	MPC · JPL
393018	2012 XG_{151}	—	July 6, 2005	Siding Spring	SSS	·	2.8 km	MPC · JPL
393019	2012 XC_{152}	—	December 5, 2008	Mount Lemmon	Mount Lemmon Survey	·	1.3 km	MPC · JPL
393020	2012 XS_{153}	—	September 4, 2008	Kitt Peak	Spacewatch	L4	7.8 km	MPC · JPL
393021	2012 XD_{155}	—	October 25, 2003	Kitt Peak	Spacewatch	·	2.0 km	MPC · JPL
393022	2012 XG_{155}	—	December 1, 2008	Mount Lemmon	Mount Lemmon Survey	·	2.1 km	MPC · JPL
393023	2012 XM_{156}	—	December 14, 2001	Socorro	LINEAR	·	2.1 km	MPC · JPL
393024	2012 YY	—	December 6, 2008	Catalina	CSS	·	3.6 km	MPC · JPL
393025	2012 YW_{3}	—	September 19, 1995	Kitt Peak	Spacewatch	·	2.8 km	MPC · JPL
393026	2012 YE_{4}	—	August 14, 2007	Siding Spring	SSS	·	2.0 km	MPC · JPL
393027	2012 YV_{4}	—	November 18, 2007	Mount Lemmon	Mount Lemmon Survey	HOF	3.0 km	MPC · JPL
393028	2012 YO_{8}	—	January 19, 2008	Mount Lemmon	Mount Lemmon Survey	·	3.0 km	MPC · JPL
393029	2013 AZ_{1}	—	January 10, 2008	Catalina	CSS	·	2.1 km	MPC · JPL
393030	2013 AQ_{4}	—	August 29, 2006	Kitt Peak	Spacewatch	·	1.6 km	MPC · JPL
393031	2013 AJ_{6}	—	December 11, 2004	Kitt Peak	Spacewatch	·	1.4 km	MPC · JPL
393032	2013 AB_{8}	—	August 25, 2004	Kitt Peak	Spacewatch	HYG	3.3 km	MPC · JPL
393033	2013 AM_{8}	—	May 28, 2009	Kitt Peak	Spacewatch	·	4.0 km	MPC · JPL
393034	2013 AT_{8}	—	April 7, 2005	Kitt Peak	Spacewatch	·	2.2 km	MPC · JPL
393035	2013 AC_{10}	—	April 10, 2005	Mount Lemmon	Mount Lemmon Survey	·	2.2 km	MPC · JPL
393036	2013 AM_{11}	—	November 17, 2006	Catalina	CSS	·	3.8 km	MPC · JPL
393037	2013 AM_{12}	—	February 13, 2008	Catalina	CSS	·	3.8 km	MPC · JPL
393038	2013 AH_{13}	—	November 17, 2006	Kitt Peak	Spacewatch	EOS	2.1 km	MPC · JPL
393039	2013 AW_{13}	—	March 4, 2000	Kitt Peak	Spacewatch	·	1.8 km	MPC · JPL
393040	2013 AD_{14}	—	January 1, 2008	Catalina	CSS	·	4.5 km	MPC · JPL
393041	2013 AR_{15}	—	June 16, 2005	Mount Lemmon	Mount Lemmon Survey	·	2.6 km	MPC · JPL
393042	2013 AZ_{16}	—	February 26, 2009	Kitt Peak	Spacewatch	·	3.3 km	MPC · JPL
393043	2013 AJ_{17}	—	December 18, 2001	Socorro	LINEAR	EOS	2.8 km	MPC · JPL
393044	2013 AA_{18}	—	February 18, 2008	Mount Lemmon	Mount Lemmon Survey	·	4.0 km	MPC · JPL
393045	2013 AL_{21}	—	November 27, 2006	Kitt Peak	Spacewatch	·	3.7 km	MPC · JPL
393046	2013 AE_{23}	—	October 4, 1997	Kitt Peak	Spacewatch	·	2.2 km	MPC · JPL
393047	2013 AW_{36}	—	October 17, 2006	Mount Lemmon	Mount Lemmon Survey	·	2.6 km	MPC · JPL
393048	2013 AZ_{36}	—	September 30, 2005	Mount Lemmon	Mount Lemmon Survey	·	3.5 km	MPC · JPL
393049	2013 AR_{38}	—	February 11, 2008	Mount Lemmon	Mount Lemmon Survey	·	3.4 km	MPC · JPL
393050	2013 AZ_{39}	—	January 3, 2013	Mount Lemmon	Mount Lemmon Survey	L4	10 km	MPC · JPL
393051	2013 AL_{46}	—	April 23, 2010	WISE	WISE	EOS	2.4 km	MPC · JPL
393052	2013 AD_{48}	—	February 9, 2008	Kitt Peak	Spacewatch	·	3.0 km	MPC · JPL
393053	2013 AQ_{49}	—	March 26, 2009	Mount Lemmon	Mount Lemmon Survey	·	2.0 km	MPC · JPL
393054	2013 AV_{49}	—	March 16, 2010	Mount Lemmon	Mount Lemmon Survey	·	1.7 km	MPC · JPL
393055	2013 AL_{54}	—	February 7, 2008	Mount Lemmon	Mount Lemmon Survey	·	2.3 km	MPC · JPL
393056	2013 AT_{55}	—	April 25, 2006	Kitt Peak	Spacewatch	RAF	1.1 km	MPC · JPL
393057	2013 AJ_{61}	—	December 14, 2001	Socorro	LINEAR	EOS	2.5 km	MPC · JPL
393058	2013 AL_{61}	—	December 14, 2001	Socorro	LINEAR	EOS	2.1 km	MPC · JPL
393059	2013 AD_{70}	—	June 21, 2007	Mount Lemmon	Mount Lemmon Survey	L4	10 km	MPC · JPL
393060	2013 AV_{71}	—	April 10, 2005	Mount Lemmon	Mount Lemmon Survey	·	1.7 km	MPC · JPL
393061	2013 AH_{73}	—	January 25, 2009	Catalina	CSS	·	1.4 km	MPC · JPL
393062	2013 AJ_{73}	—	October 20, 2006	Kitt Peak	Spacewatch	·	5.6 km	MPC · JPL
393063	2013 AB_{75}	—	March 10, 2005	Catalina	CSS	EUN	1.9 km	MPC · JPL
393064	2013 AO_{75}	—	September 24, 2000	Socorro	LINEAR	·	1.6 km	MPC · JPL
393065	2013 AX_{78}	—	September 18, 2007	Siding Spring	SSS	BAR	1.7 km	MPC · JPL
393066	2013 AX_{80}	—	April 30, 2006	Kitt Peak	Spacewatch	·	1.1 km	MPC · JPL
393067	2013 AV_{81}	—	February 8, 2008	Kitt Peak	Spacewatch	EOS	2.2 km	MPC · JPL
393068	2013 AF_{83}	—	March 2, 2009	Kitt Peak	Spacewatch	·	5.3 km	MPC · JPL
393069	2013 AP_{83}	—	October 31, 2011	Mount Lemmon	Mount Lemmon Survey	·	2.6 km	MPC · JPL
393070	2013 AR_{83}	—	November 20, 2006	Kitt Peak	Spacewatch	·	2.8 km	MPC · JPL
393071	2013 AZ_{83}	—	October 21, 2006	Mount Lemmon	Mount Lemmon Survey	·	2.0 km	MPC · JPL
393072	2013 AK_{87}	—	October 2, 2000	Socorro	LINEAR	NYS	1.4 km	MPC · JPL
393073	2013 AB_{91}	—	August 19, 2006	Kitt Peak	Spacewatch	·	2.5 km	MPC · JPL
393074	2013 AK_{91}	—	December 10, 2006	Kitt Peak	Spacewatch	·	3.4 km	MPC · JPL
393075	2013 AF_{93}	—	February 7, 2008	Mount Lemmon	Mount Lemmon Survey	·	2.7 km	MPC · JPL
393076	2013 AL_{93}	—	March 1, 2009	Kitt Peak	Spacewatch	KOR	1.8 km	MPC · JPL
393077	2013 AY_{93}	—	June 16, 2004	Kitt Peak	Spacewatch	·	3.9 km	MPC · JPL
393078	2013 AO_{94}	—	December 19, 2003	Kitt Peak	Spacewatch	·	2.1 km	MPC · JPL
393079	2013 AU_{98}	—	December 25, 2006	Kitt Peak	Spacewatch	CYB	3.7 km	MPC · JPL
393080	2013 AA_{99}	—	March 1, 2009	Mount Lemmon	Mount Lemmon Survey	MRX	1.3 km	MPC · JPL
393081	2013 AD_{99}	—	July 15, 2005	Kitt Peak	Spacewatch	EOS	2.0 km	MPC · JPL
393082	2013 AR_{99}	—	November 27, 2000	Kitt Peak	Spacewatch	·	2.4 km	MPC · JPL
393083	2013 AJ_{100}	—	November 25, 2006	Mount Lemmon	Mount Lemmon Survey	·	3.2 km	MPC · JPL
393084	2013 AP_{100}	—	March 27, 2004	Kitt Peak	Spacewatch	·	4.3 km	MPC · JPL
393085	2013 AU_{102}	—	December 13, 2006	Kitt Peak	Spacewatch	·	3.7 km	MPC · JPL
393086	2013 AD_{104}	—	December 19, 2007	Mount Lemmon	Mount Lemmon Survey	·	2.2 km	MPC · JPL
393087	2013 AV_{107}	—	October 7, 2005	Kitt Peak	Spacewatch	·	2.7 km	MPC · JPL
393088	2013 AG_{108}	—	September 11, 2007	Kitt Peak	Spacewatch	·	1.0 km	MPC · JPL
393089	2013 AO_{108}	—	February 8, 2008	Mount Lemmon	Mount Lemmon Survey	·	3.2 km	MPC · JPL
393090	2013 AC_{109}	—	March 26, 2009	Mount Lemmon	Mount Lemmon Survey	·	2.9 km	MPC · JPL
393091	2013 AF_{109}	—	June 12, 2010	WISE	WISE	·	2.3 km	MPC · JPL
393092	2013 AR_{116}	—	December 1, 2006	Mount Lemmon	Mount Lemmon Survey	·	3.7 km	MPC · JPL
393093	2013 AY_{117}	—	December 22, 2006	Kitt Peak	Spacewatch	EOS	2.7 km	MPC · JPL
393094	2013 AP_{119}	—	November 24, 2008	Mount Lemmon	Mount Lemmon Survey	·	1.3 km	MPC · JPL
393095	2013 AA_{128}	—	October 10, 2007	Mount Lemmon	Mount Lemmon Survey	·	1.9 km	MPC · JPL
393096	2013 AY_{128}	—	November 20, 2007	Kitt Peak	Spacewatch	·	2.0 km	MPC · JPL
393097	2013 AF_{132}	—	September 17, 2009	Kitt Peak	Spacewatch	L4	10 km	MPC · JPL
393098	2013 AJ_{132}	—	December 30, 2000	Kitt Peak	Spacewatch	L4	7.1 km	MPC · JPL
393099	2013 AZ_{132}	—	October 30, 2010	Mount Lemmon	Mount Lemmon Survey	L4	10 km	MPC · JPL
393100	2013 AL_{133}	—	September 6, 2008	Mount Lemmon	Mount Lemmon Survey	L4	10 km	MPC · JPL

== 393101–393200 ==
back to top

Designation			Discovery			Properties		Ref
Permanent	Provisional	Named after	Date	Site	Discoverer(s)	Category	Diam.	Ref
393101	2013 AO_{139}	—	November 21, 2006	Mount Lemmon	Mount Lemmon Survey	·	2.6 km	MPC · JPL
393102	2013 AY_{148}	—	March 31, 2009	Mount Lemmon	Mount Lemmon Survey	EOS	1.8 km	MPC · JPL
393103	2013 AG_{159}	—	August 30, 2005	Kitt Peak	Spacewatch	·	3.0 km	MPC · JPL
393104	2013 AK_{160}	—	October 23, 2006	Kitt Peak	Spacewatch	DOR	2.7 km	MPC · JPL
393105	2013 AH_{172}	—	September 24, 2000	Socorro	LINEAR	·	2.9 km	MPC · JPL
393106	2013 AB_{174}	—	October 9, 2005	Kitt Peak	Spacewatch	·	3.3 km	MPC · JPL
393107	2013 BO	—	November 26, 2011	Haleakala	Pan-STARRS 1	L4	10 km	MPC · JPL
393108	2013 BW	—	September 24, 2009	Mount Lemmon	Mount Lemmon Survey	L4	8.6 km	MPC · JPL
393109	2013 BW_{1}	—	February 7, 2002	Kitt Peak	Spacewatch	L4	8.1 km	MPC · JPL
393110	2013 BK_{3}	—	September 25, 2005	Catalina	CSS	·	4.2 km	MPC · JPL
393111	2013 BG_{6}	—	September 10, 2007	Mount Lemmon	Mount Lemmon Survey	·	2.1 km	MPC · JPL
393112	2013 BF_{8}	—	October 14, 2001	Socorro	LINEAR	·	890 m	MPC · JPL
393113	2013 BL_{8}	—	November 5, 2007	Kitt Peak	Spacewatch	AGN	1.3 km	MPC · JPL
393114	2013 BO_{10}	—	September 24, 2000	Socorro	LINEAR	·	1.5 km	MPC · JPL
393115	2013 BH_{19}	—	November 3, 1999	Catalina	CSS	·	750 m	MPC · JPL
393116	2013 BD_{21}	—	March 31, 2003	Kitt Peak	Spacewatch	·	4.0 km	MPC · JPL
393117	2013 BC_{28}	—	March 11, 2008	Catalina	CSS	·	4.5 km	MPC · JPL
393118	2013 BO_{30}	—	April 25, 2004	Kitt Peak	Spacewatch	·	2.5 km	MPC · JPL
393119	2013 BU_{30}	—	October 21, 2006	Mount Lemmon	Mount Lemmon Survey	·	2.1 km	MPC · JPL
393120	2013 BB_{31}	—	November 2, 2006	Mount Lemmon	Mount Lemmon Survey	·	3.0 km	MPC · JPL
393121	2013 BM_{31}	—	March 22, 2009	Mount Lemmon	Mount Lemmon Survey	·	2.9 km	MPC · JPL
393122	2013 BH_{33}	—	April 2, 2005	Mount Lemmon	Mount Lemmon Survey	·	940 m	MPC · JPL
393123	2013 BS_{33}	—	March 2, 2009	Kitt Peak	Spacewatch	·	2.2 km	MPC · JPL
393124	2013 BH_{35}	—	November 16, 2006	Kitt Peak	Spacewatch	·	2.6 km	MPC · JPL
393125	2013 BA_{40}	—	February 9, 2008	Mount Lemmon	Mount Lemmon Survey	·	2.3 km	MPC · JPL
393126	2013 BC_{40}	—	January 6, 2002	Kitt Peak	Spacewatch	·	2.7 km	MPC · JPL
393127	2013 BU_{40}	—	September 1, 2005	Kitt Peak	Spacewatch	·	2.4 km	MPC · JPL
393128	2013 BG_{41}	—	September 12, 2001	Socorro	LINEAR	·	2.1 km	MPC · JPL
393129	2013 BX_{41}	—	January 12, 2002	Kitt Peak	Spacewatch	·	2.2 km	MPC · JPL
393130	2013 BY_{43}	—	December 31, 2007	Mount Lemmon	Mount Lemmon Survey	KOR	1.3 km	MPC · JPL
393131	2013 BL_{47}	—	April 30, 2009	Kitt Peak	Spacewatch	·	2.7 km	MPC · JPL
393132	2013 BY_{47}	—	January 23, 2006	Kitt Peak	Spacewatch	·	1.9 km	MPC · JPL
393133	2013 BZ_{47}	—	May 11, 2007	Mount Lemmon	Mount Lemmon Survey	·	1.1 km	MPC · JPL
393134	2013 BR_{48}	—	May 17, 2005	Mount Lemmon	Mount Lemmon Survey	HOF	3.0 km	MPC · JPL
393135	2013 BU_{48}	—	October 17, 2010	Mount Lemmon	Mount Lemmon Survey	L4	7.2 km	MPC · JPL
393136	2013 BF_{49}	—	February 13, 2002	Kitt Peak	Spacewatch	THM	2.7 km	MPC · JPL
393137	2013 BU_{49}	—	November 19, 2006	Catalina	CSS	·	2.6 km	MPC · JPL
393138	2013 BG_{50}	—	February 16, 2004	Kitt Peak	Spacewatch	·	2.4 km	MPC · JPL
393139	2013 BU_{50}	—	December 10, 2006	Kitt Peak	Spacewatch	VER	2.9 km	MPC · JPL
393140	2013 BY_{50}	—	May 9, 2005	Mount Lemmon	Mount Lemmon Survey	AGN	1.3 km	MPC · JPL
393141	2013 BN_{54}	—	January 8, 2002	Socorro	LINEAR	·	4.3 km	MPC · JPL
393142	2013 BO_{55}	—	March 11, 2008	Catalina	CSS	·	4.1 km	MPC · JPL
393143	2013 BU_{59}	—	May 16, 2009	Kitt Peak	Spacewatch	·	3.1 km	MPC · JPL
393144	2013 BT_{60}	—	September 29, 2009	Mount Lemmon	Mount Lemmon Survey	L4	8.6 km	MPC · JPL
393145	2013 BY_{64}	—	September 15, 2006	Kitt Peak	Spacewatch	·	2.3 km	MPC · JPL
393146	2013 BP_{71}	—	May 25, 2006	Mount Lemmon	Mount Lemmon Survey	·	1.7 km	MPC · JPL
393147	2013 BX_{71}	—	May 14, 2005	Mount Lemmon	Mount Lemmon Survey	·	2.4 km	MPC · JPL
393148	2013 BM_{72}	—	March 24, 2003	Kitt Peak	Spacewatch	·	4.5 km	MPC · JPL
393149	2013 BR_{75}	—	September 19, 2008	Kitt Peak	Spacewatch	L4	7.9 km	MPC · JPL
393150	2013 BY_{79}	—	March 15, 2004	Campo Imperatore	CINEOS	HOF	3.7 km	MPC · JPL
393151	2013 BB_{80}	—	October 21, 2006	Mount Lemmon	Mount Lemmon Survey	·	1.7 km	MPC · JPL
393152	2013 BJ_{80}	—	January 14, 2002	Kitt Peak	Spacewatch	VER	2.5 km	MPC · JPL
393153	2013 CN	—	February 22, 2009	Kitt Peak	Spacewatch	·	2.8 km	MPC · JPL
393154	2013 CA_{2}	—	March 13, 2005	Mount Lemmon	Mount Lemmon Survey	·	2.8 km	MPC · JPL
393155	2013 CM_{15}	—	September 18, 2009	Kitt Peak	Spacewatch	L4	6.6 km	MPC · JPL
393156	2013 CV_{15}	—	January 2, 2012	Mount Lemmon	Mount Lemmon Survey	L4	6.7 km	MPC · JPL
393157	2013 CD_{16}	—	January 24, 2001	Kitt Peak	Spacewatch	L4	10 km	MPC · JPL
393158	2013 CO_{19}	—	August 27, 2006	Kitt Peak	Spacewatch	KOR	1.3 km	MPC · JPL
393159	2013 CT_{22}	—	August 29, 2005	Kitt Peak	Spacewatch	·	3.4 km	MPC · JPL
393160	2013 CN_{23}	—	April 2, 2009	Mount Lemmon	Mount Lemmon Survey	·	2.5 km	MPC · JPL
393161	2013 CX_{24}	—	May 10, 2005	Kitt Peak	Spacewatch	·	2.0 km	MPC · JPL
393162	2013 CY_{25}	—	January 5, 2002	Kitt Peak	Spacewatch	EOS	2.4 km	MPC · JPL
393163	2013 CK_{27}	—	September 14, 2005	Kitt Peak	Spacewatch	·	2.7 km	MPC · JPL
393164	2013 CX_{29}	—	November 14, 2006	Kitt Peak	Spacewatch	·	2.0 km	MPC · JPL
393165	2013 CE_{30}	—	September 29, 2009	Mount Lemmon	Mount Lemmon Survey	L4	7.4 km	MPC · JPL
393166	2013 CM_{37}	—	April 21, 1998	Kitt Peak	Spacewatch	EOS	3.0 km	MPC · JPL
393167	2013 CW_{37}	—	August 20, 2004	Kitt Peak	Spacewatch	·	4.6 km	MPC · JPL
393168	2013 CV_{40}	—	July 8, 2005	Kitt Peak	Spacewatch	EOS	1.9 km	MPC · JPL
393169	2013 CS_{41}	—	November 9, 1993	Kitt Peak	Spacewatch	LUT	4.3 km	MPC · JPL
393170	2013 CW_{43}	—	September 27, 2009	Mount Lemmon	Mount Lemmon Survey	L4	8.6 km	MPC · JPL
393171	2013 CD_{49}	—	January 11, 2000	Kitt Peak	Spacewatch	(7744)	2.0 km	MPC · JPL
393172	2013 CZ_{59}	—	February 25, 2006	Kitt Peak	Spacewatch	3:2	6.0 km	MPC · JPL
393173	2013 CQ_{60}	—	January 16, 2008	Kitt Peak	Spacewatch	·	2.6 km	MPC · JPL
393174	2013 CD_{66}	—	October 27, 2005	Catalina	CSS	TIR	2.0 km	MPC · JPL
393175	2013 CK_{66}	—	March 2, 2008	Kitt Peak	Spacewatch	EOS	2.2 km	MPC · JPL
393176	2013 CF_{69}	—	March 31, 2008	Mount Lemmon	Mount Lemmon Survey	VER	3.4 km	MPC · JPL
393177	2013 CW_{70}	—	October 17, 2010	Mount Lemmon	Mount Lemmon Survey	L4	6.8 km	MPC · JPL
393178	2013 CP_{73}	—	February 10, 2008	Kitt Peak	Spacewatch	·	3.6 km	MPC · JPL
393179	2013 CX_{80}	—	October 28, 2005	Mount Lemmon	Mount Lemmon Survey	·	3.2 km	MPC · JPL
393180	2013 CR_{95}	—	March 4, 2008	Kitt Peak	Spacewatch	EOS	2.0 km	MPC · JPL
393181	2013 CH_{100}	—	June 15, 2010	WISE	WISE	·	2.7 km	MPC · JPL
393182	2013 CU_{100}	—	February 17, 2001	Kitt Peak	Spacewatch	L4	9.8 km	MPC · JPL
393183	2013 CA_{101}	—	August 8, 1999	Kitt Peak	Spacewatch	·	3.3 km	MPC · JPL
393184	2013 CR_{101}	—	January 17, 2005	Kitt Peak	Spacewatch	3:2 · SHU	7.9 km	MPC · JPL
393185	2013 CZ_{113}	—	November 18, 2007	Mount Lemmon	Mount Lemmon Survey	·	1.6 km	MPC · JPL
393186	2013 CF_{115}	—	September 11, 2007	Kitt Peak	Spacewatch	L4	10 km	MPC · JPL
393187	2013 CW_{118}	—	February 2, 2005	Kitt Peak	Spacewatch	HIL · 3:2	6.5 km	MPC · JPL
393188	2013 CV_{132}	—	April 7, 2005	Kitt Peak	Spacewatch	·	2.1 km	MPC · JPL
393189	2013 CN_{135}	—	January 13, 2005	Kitt Peak	Spacewatch	3:2	6.9 km	MPC · JPL
393190	2013 CM_{144}	—	April 9, 2003	Kitt Peak	Spacewatch	·	2.6 km	MPC · JPL
393191	2013 CT_{144}	—	February 10, 1996	Kitt Peak	Spacewatch	·	3.1 km	MPC · JPL
393192	2013 CR_{145}	—	June 5, 2010	Kitt Peak	Spacewatch	MAR	1.3 km	MPC · JPL
393193	2013 CQ_{148}	—	March 10, 2008	Catalina	CSS	TIR	3.5 km	MPC · JPL
393194	2013 CB_{153}	—	November 20, 1995	Kitt Peak	Spacewatch	·	2.8 km	MPC · JPL
393195	2013 CJ_{173}	—	January 7, 1995	Kitt Peak	Spacewatch	·	1.9 km	MPC · JPL
393196	2013 CE_{180}	—	January 25, 2002	Socorro	LINEAR	·	5.2 km	MPC · JPL
393197	2013 CG_{180}	—	April 29, 2003	Kitt Peak	Spacewatch	·	4.2 km	MPC · JPL
393198	2013 CG_{181}	—	December 12, 2006	Socorro	LINEAR	·	3.8 km	MPC · JPL
393199	2013 CN_{185}	—	April 24, 2004	Kitt Peak	Spacewatch	L4	9.8 km	MPC · JPL
393200	2013 CL_{197}	—	December 31, 2011	Mount Lemmon	Mount Lemmon Survey	L4	7.8 km	MPC · JPL

== 393201–393300 ==
back to top

Designation			Discovery			Properties		Ref
Permanent	Provisional	Named after	Date	Site	Discoverer(s)	Category	Diam.	Ref
393201	2013 CQ_{197}	—	October 12, 2007	Mount Lemmon	Mount Lemmon Survey	·	1.5 km	MPC · JPL
393202	2013 CC_{204}	—	October 2, 2008	Mount Lemmon	Mount Lemmon Survey	L4	8.2 km	MPC · JPL
393203	2013 CX_{204}	—	November 24, 2006	Kitt Peak	Spacewatch	·	3.0 km	MPC · JPL
393204	2013 CO_{205}	—	March 31, 2008	Mount Lemmon	Mount Lemmon Survey	·	3.4 km	MPC · JPL
393205	2013 CW_{206}	—	September 26, 2009	Kitt Peak	Spacewatch	L4	7.0 km	MPC · JPL
393206	2013 CM_{210}	—	September 5, 2008	Kitt Peak	Spacewatch	L4	7.1 km	MPC · JPL
393207	2013 CG_{211}	—	April 7, 2003	Kitt Peak	Spacewatch	·	2.7 km	MPC · JPL
393208	2013 CG_{214}	—	September 16, 2009	Kitt Peak	Spacewatch	L4	7.2 km	MPC · JPL
393209	2013 CC_{222}	—	July 26, 1995	Kitt Peak	Spacewatch	L4	7.5 km	MPC · JPL
393210	2013 DO_{1}	—	December 13, 2004	Campo Imperatore	CINEOS	PHO	1.4 km	MPC · JPL
393211	2013 DF_{2}	—	October 12, 2010	Mount Lemmon	Mount Lemmon Survey	L4	8.0 km	MPC · JPL
393212	2013 EW	—	December 3, 2000	Kitt Peak	Spacewatch	·	3.4 km	MPC · JPL
393213	2013 EY	—	October 4, 2006	Mount Lemmon	Mount Lemmon Survey	·	4.8 km	MPC · JPL
393214	2013 EG_{5}	—	May 27, 2003	Kitt Peak	Spacewatch	·	3.2 km	MPC · JPL
393215	2013 EO_{15}	—	October 18, 2007	Kitt Peak	Spacewatch	L4	10 km	MPC · JPL
393216	2013 EH_{16}	—	January 28, 2000	Kitt Peak	Spacewatch	L4	7.5 km	MPC · JPL
393217	2013 ED_{17}	—	January 27, 2007	Mount Lemmon	Mount Lemmon Survey	CYB	3.9 km	MPC · JPL
393218	2013 EH_{18}	—	January 14, 2002	Kitt Peak	Spacewatch	·	3.5 km	MPC · JPL
393219	2013 EA_{31}	—	April 6, 2010	Kitt Peak	Spacewatch	·	720 m	MPC · JPL
393220	2013 EC_{61}	—	October 9, 2004	Kitt Peak	Spacewatch	·	1.1 km	MPC · JPL
393221	2013 EJ_{71}	—	September 20, 1998	Kitt Peak	Spacewatch	·	3.5 km	MPC · JPL
393222	2013 ES_{86}	—	August 10, 2007	Kitt Peak	Spacewatch	·	1.5 km	MPC · JPL
393223	2013 EN_{101}	—	November 16, 2006	Kitt Peak	Spacewatch	LUT	5.6 km	MPC · JPL
393224	2013 EB_{103}	—	December 19, 2004	Mount Lemmon	Mount Lemmon Survey	V	840 m	MPC · JPL
393225	2013 FL_{4}	—	September 4, 2008	Kitt Peak	Spacewatch	L4	10 km	MPC · JPL
393226	2013 FZ_{10}	—	September 30, 1999	Kitt Peak	Spacewatch	·	2.9 km	MPC · JPL
393227	2013 GC_{53}	—	February 20, 2009	Kitt Peak	Spacewatch	·	1.4 km	MPC · JPL
393228	2013 GN_{56}	—	April 2, 2006	Kitt Peak	Spacewatch	·	1.0 km	MPC · JPL
393229	2013 GL_{87}	—	January 15, 1996	Kitt Peak	Spacewatch	·	2.5 km	MPC · JPL
393230	2013 GU_{95}	—	December 21, 2005	Catalina	CSS	·	5.5 km	MPC · JPL
393231	2013 GT_{102}	—	November 22, 2005	Kitt Peak	Spacewatch	·	3.6 km	MPC · JPL
393232	2013 JP_{26}	—	July 25, 2010	WISE	WISE	(69559)	3.7 km	MPC · JPL
393233	2013 JL_{58}	—	March 10, 2008	Mount Lemmon	Mount Lemmon Survey	·	2.5 km	MPC · JPL
393234	2013 JS_{62}	—	October 16, 2003	Kitt Peak	Spacewatch	NYS	1.0 km	MPC · JPL
393235	2013 OG_{9}	—	March 17, 2004	Kitt Peak	Spacewatch	·	2.1 km	MPC · JPL
393236	2013 PJ_{43}	—	August 21, 1999	Kitt Peak	Spacewatch	·	2.1 km	MPC · JPL
393237	2013 PL_{61}	—	January 9, 2006	Kitt Peak	Spacewatch	TRE	2.8 km	MPC · JPL
393238	2013 QV_{22}	—	May 23, 2003	Kitt Peak	Spacewatch	·	2.2 km	MPC · JPL
393239	2013 QH_{29}	—	December 29, 2005	Kitt Peak	Spacewatch	·	1.5 km	MPC · JPL
393240	2013 QF_{47}	—	March 8, 2005	Anderson Mesa	LONEOS	·	1.1 km	MPC · JPL
393241	2013 QL_{59}	—	September 17, 2009	Kitt Peak	Spacewatch	·	1.3 km	MPC · JPL
393242	2013 QC_{64}	—	June 14, 2007	Kitt Peak	Spacewatch	·	4.0 km	MPC · JPL
393243	2013 QH_{75}	—	December 5, 1996	Kitt Peak	Spacewatch	·	1.8 km	MPC · JPL
393244	2013 QE_{82}	—	February 21, 2006	Mount Lemmon	Mount Lemmon Survey	EOS	1.7 km	MPC · JPL
393245	2013 QG_{86}	—	January 23, 1998	Kitt Peak	Spacewatch	·	790 m	MPC · JPL
393246	2013 RB	—	October 7, 2008	Mount Lemmon	Mount Lemmon Survey	T_{j} (2.99)	3.7 km	MPC · JPL
393247	2013 RE_{37}	—	August 16, 2002	Kitt Peak	Spacewatch	·	970 m	MPC · JPL
393248	2013 RB_{68}	—	January 20, 2009	Catalina	CSS	·	2.1 km	MPC · JPL
393249	2013 RK_{73}	—	July 3, 2003	Kitt Peak	Spacewatch	JUN	1.9 km	MPC · JPL
393250	2013 RA_{97}	—	October 27, 2003	Kitt Peak	Spacewatch	·	3.7 km	MPC · JPL
393251	2013 SM_{45}	—	February 24, 2006	Mount Lemmon	Mount Lemmon Survey	KOR	1.3 km	MPC · JPL
393252	2013 SH_{52}	—	January 16, 1999	Kitt Peak	Spacewatch	EOS	2.5 km	MPC · JPL
393253	2013 TU_{3}	—	December 3, 2005	Catalina	CSS	·	2.0 km	MPC · JPL
393254	2013 TL_{11}	—	April 6, 2008	Mount Lemmon	Mount Lemmon Survey	·	1 km	MPC · JPL
393255	2013 TV_{13}	—	May 16, 2012	Mount Lemmon	Mount Lemmon Survey	·	1.7 km	MPC · JPL
393256	2013 TQ_{37}	—	October 15, 1996	Kitt Peak	Spacewatch	EUN	1.5 km	MPC · JPL
393257	2013 TV_{87}	—	March 16, 2005	Mount Lemmon	Mount Lemmon Survey	·	2.9 km	MPC · JPL
393258	2013 TB_{107}	—	October 4, 2007	Mount Lemmon	Mount Lemmon Survey	·	2.8 km	MPC · JPL
393259	2013 TD_{138}	—	October 25, 2008	Kitt Peak	Spacewatch	·	3.2 km	MPC · JPL
393260	2013 UU_{14}	—	January 30, 2006	Kitt Peak	Spacewatch	·	2.2 km	MPC · JPL
393261	2013 VK_{8}	—	December 5, 2002	Socorro	LINEAR	·	1.3 km	MPC · JPL
393262	2013 VW_{8}	—	December 5, 2002	Socorro	LINEAR	·	3.7 km	MPC · JPL
393263	2013 VT_{14}	—	October 20, 2006	Mount Lemmon	Mount Lemmon Survey	HIL · 3:2	7.6 km	MPC · JPL
393264	2013 WW_{16}	—	October 2, 2006	Mount Lemmon	Mount Lemmon Survey	·	650 m	MPC · JPL
393265	2013 WK_{32}	—	November 20, 2008	Mount Lemmon	Mount Lemmon Survey	·	3.5 km	MPC · JPL
393266	2013 WQ_{35}	—	December 29, 2003	Socorro	LINEAR	·	4.2 km	MPC · JPL
393267	2013 WH_{43}	—	February 16, 2004	Kitt Peak	Spacewatch	·	540 m	MPC · JPL
393268	2013 WA_{53}	—	February 20, 2010	WISE	WISE	·	3.8 km	MPC · JPL
393269	2013 WO_{56}	—	October 9, 1999	Socorro	LINEAR	·	960 m	MPC · JPL
393270	2013 WS_{64}	—	August 20, 2000	Kitt Peak	Spacewatch	·	1.6 km	MPC · JPL
393271	2013 WN_{65}	—	January 6, 2010	Kitt Peak	Spacewatch	PAD	1.9 km	MPC · JPL
393272	2013 WT_{66}	—	December 19, 2003	Kitt Peak	Spacewatch	EOS	2.4 km	MPC · JPL
393273	2013 WU_{68}	—	August 5, 2008	Siding Spring	SSS	·	1.9 km	MPC · JPL
393274	2013 WJ_{82}	—	December 7, 2005	Kitt Peak	Spacewatch	·	970 m	MPC · JPL
393275	2013 WX_{85}	—	November 17, 1995	Kitt Peak	Spacewatch	WIT	1.2 km	MPC · JPL
393276	2013 WH_{107}	—	February 9, 2010	Catalina	CSS	·	3.4 km	MPC · JPL
393277	2013 WN_{108}	—	December 11, 2002	Socorro	LINEAR	·	4.4 km	MPC · JPL
393278	2013 XN_{3}	—	October 8, 2004	Kitt Peak	Spacewatch	·	1.6 km	MPC · JPL
393279	2013 XA_{10}	—	April 7, 2003	Kitt Peak	Spacewatch	·	2.2 km	MPC · JPL
393280	2013 XV_{11}	—	October 18, 2006	Kitt Peak	Spacewatch	·	620 m	MPC · JPL
393281	2013 XO_{19}	—	September 23, 2008	Mount Lemmon	Mount Lemmon Survey	·	4.4 km	MPC · JPL
393282	2013 YS_{3}	—	February 4, 2006	Catalina	CSS	EUN	1.5 km	MPC · JPL
393283	2013 YB_{5}	—	November 27, 2009	Mount Lemmon	Mount Lemmon Survey	·	2.8 km	MPC · JPL
393284	2013 YN_{5}	—	March 3, 2005	Catalina	CSS	KOR	1.6 km	MPC · JPL
393285	2013 YE_{6}	—	May 11, 2003	Kitt Peak	Spacewatch	EUN	2.5 km	MPC · JPL
393286	2013 YR_{6}	—	October 14, 2004	Anderson Mesa	LONEOS	EUN	4.8 km	MPC · JPL
393287	2013 YG_{12}	—	December 19, 2003	Kitt Peak	Spacewatch	·	2.0 km	MPC · JPL
393288	2013 YS_{14}	—	February 4, 2005	Mount Lemmon	Mount Lemmon Survey	·	2.4 km	MPC · JPL
393289	2013 YT_{41}	—	February 28, 2008	Kitt Peak	Spacewatch	·	660 m	MPC · JPL
393290	2013 YP_{45}	—	March 27, 2011	Kitt Peak	Spacewatch	·	760 m	MPC · JPL
393291	2013 YR_{46}	—	February 12, 2004	Kitt Peak	Spacewatch	EOS	2.0 km	MPC · JPL
393292	2013 YN_{48}	—	May 25, 2006	Mount Lemmon	Mount Lemmon Survey	·	5.9 km	MPC · JPL
393293	2013 YN_{50}	—	February 9, 2007	Kitt Peak	Spacewatch	·	1.1 km	MPC · JPL
393294	2013 YO_{58}	—	March 15, 2010	Catalina	CSS	TRE	3.6 km	MPC · JPL
393295	2013 YX_{63}	—	November 22, 2006	Catalina	CSS	·	780 m	MPC · JPL
393296	2013 YU_{64}	—	September 17, 2006	Kitt Peak	Spacewatch	·	3.3 km	MPC · JPL
393297	2013 YW_{65}	—	August 23, 2008	Siding Spring	SSS	·	3.5 km	MPC · JPL
393298	2013 YE_{68}	—	December 17, 2001	Socorro	LINEAR	NYS	1.0 km	MPC · JPL
393299	2013 YM_{68}	—	July 5, 2005	Kitt Peak	Spacewatch	·	3.6 km	MPC · JPL
393300	2013 YF_{69}	—	February 4, 2009	Mount Lemmon	Mount Lemmon Survey	·	5.1 km	MPC · JPL

== 393301–393400 ==
back to top

Designation			Discovery			Properties		Ref
Permanent	Provisional	Named after	Date	Site	Discoverer(s)	Category	Diam.	Ref
393301	2013 YY_{72}	—	November 13, 2007	Kitt Peak	Spacewatch	EOS	2.2 km	MPC · JPL
393302	2013 YA_{88}	—	February 2, 2000	Socorro	LINEAR	H	830 m	MPC · JPL
393303	2013 YX_{100}	—	March 11, 2007	Kitt Peak	Spacewatch	·	1.6 km	MPC · JPL
393304	2013 YL_{105}	—	October 22, 1998	Kitt Peak	Spacewatch	AGN	1.4 km	MPC · JPL
393305	2013 YQ_{105}	—	February 4, 2005	Mount Lemmon	Mount Lemmon Survey	AGN	1.3 km	MPC · JPL
393306	2013 YN_{106}	—	November 22, 2006	Mount Lemmon	Mount Lemmon Survey	·	1.0 km	MPC · JPL
393307	2013 YT_{108}	—	March 9, 2002	Kitt Peak	Spacewatch	(5)	890 m	MPC · JPL
393308	2013 YQ_{124}	—	September 22, 2008	Socorro	LINEAR	(5)	1.4 km	MPC · JPL
393309	2013 YS_{124}	—	September 23, 2005	Catalina	CSS	V	720 m	MPC · JPL
393310	2013 YC_{132}	—	April 26, 2003	Kitt Peak	Spacewatch	·	1.7 km	MPC · JPL
393311	2013 YM_{142}	—	March 13, 2010	Siding Spring	SSS	TIR	4.7 km	MPC · JPL
393312	2013 YM_{143}	—	November 24, 2006	Kitt Peak	Spacewatch	·	810 m	MPC · JPL
393313	2014 AZ_{3}	—	January 12, 2010	WISE	WISE	·	2.4 km	MPC · JPL
393314	2014 AN_{8}	—	December 5, 2005	Mount Lemmon	Mount Lemmon Survey	3:2	4.0 km	MPC · JPL
393315	2014 AB_{24}	—	April 15, 2010	Mount Lemmon	Mount Lemmon Survey	·	2.6 km	MPC · JPL
393316	2014 AZ_{26}	—	January 11, 2008	Kitt Peak	Spacewatch	·	3.5 km	MPC · JPL
393317	2014 AB_{30}	—	October 26, 2008	Mount Lemmon	Mount Lemmon Survey	·	2.2 km	MPC · JPL
393318	2014 AG_{37}	—	September 17, 2004	Anderson Mesa	LONEOS	·	1.6 km	MPC · JPL
393319	2014 AV_{40}	—	September 26, 2006	Kitt Peak	Spacewatch	·	720 m	MPC · JPL
393320	2014 AR_{49}	—	October 5, 2005	Mount Lemmon	Mount Lemmon Survey	·	1.1 km	MPC · JPL
393321	2014 AY_{49}	—	August 24, 2007	Kitt Peak	Spacewatch	·	1.7 km	MPC · JPL
393322	2014 AE_{50}	—	March 2, 2006	Kitt Peak	Spacewatch	·	1.5 km	MPC · JPL
393323	2014 AJ_{53}	—	February 16, 2001	Socorro	LINEAR	EUN	1.6 km	MPC · JPL
393324	2014 BZ_{6}	—	November 23, 2008	Kitt Peak	Spacewatch	AGN	1.3 km	MPC · JPL
393325	2014 BE_{7}	—	December 18, 2009	Mount Lemmon	Mount Lemmon Survey	·	1.2 km	MPC · JPL
393326	2014 BV_{7}	—	January 25, 2006	Kitt Peak	Spacewatch	·	2.2 km	MPC · JPL
393327	2014 BD_{12}	—	May 12, 2010	Mount Lemmon	Mount Lemmon Survey	·	3.0 km	MPC · JPL
393328	2014 BP_{18}	—	April 25, 2003	Kitt Peak	Spacewatch	NYS	1.3 km	MPC · JPL
393329	2014 BV_{21}	—	November 14, 2006	Mount Lemmon	Mount Lemmon Survey	·	580 m	MPC · JPL
393330	2014 BT_{22}	—	March 26, 2003	Kitt Peak	Spacewatch	·	1.4 km	MPC · JPL
393331	2014 BS_{34}	—	February 23, 2007	Kitt Peak	Spacewatch	·	850 m	MPC · JPL
393332	2014 BP_{35}	—	February 23, 2007	Kitt Peak	Spacewatch	NYS	950 m	MPC · JPL
393333	2014 BM_{36}	—	December 12, 2006	Mount Lemmon	Mount Lemmon Survey	·	700 m	MPC · JPL
393334	2014 BP_{36}	—	March 9, 2005	Kitt Peak	Spacewatch	·	2.4 km	MPC · JPL
393335	2014 BH_{40}	—	February 1, 2005	Kitt Peak	Spacewatch	·	2.6 km	MPC · JPL
393336	2014 BV_{41}	—	September 19, 2006	Kitt Peak	Spacewatch	·	2.4 km	MPC · JPL
393337	2014 BK_{44}	—	February 23, 2006	Anderson Mesa	LONEOS	·	1.7 km	MPC · JPL
393338	2014 BN_{44}	—	January 31, 2010	WISE	WISE	·	1.9 km	MPC · JPL
393339	2014 BT_{44}	—	January 16, 2004	Kitt Peak	Spacewatch	·	530 m	MPC · JPL
393340	2014 BC_{54}	—	November 30, 2005	Kitt Peak	Spacewatch	MAS	810 m	MPC · JPL
393341	2014 BG_{56}	—	October 1, 2008	Kitt Peak	Spacewatch	·	1.5 km	MPC · JPL
393342	2014 BG_{63}	—	February 2, 2005	Kitt Peak	Spacewatch	·	2.9 km	MPC · JPL
393343	2014 CE_{5}	—	January 3, 2009	Mount Lemmon	Mount Lemmon Survey	·	3.2 km	MPC · JPL
393344	2014 EF_{1}	—	May 8, 2011	Kitt Peak	Spacewatch	·	700 m	MPC · JPL
393345	2014 EH_{1}	—	October 7, 2000	Kitt Peak	Spacewatch	·	3.1 km	MPC · JPL
393346	4329 P-L	—	September 24, 1960	Palomar	C. J. van Houten, I. van Houten-Groeneveld, T. Gehrels	·	680 m	MPC · JPL
393347	4725 P-L	—	September 24, 1960	Palomar	C. J. van Houten, I. van Houten-Groeneveld, T. Gehrels	·	2.3 km	MPC · JPL
393348	1988 RO_{1}	—	September 13, 1988	Palomar	C. S. Shoemaker	·	1.5 km	MPC · JPL
393349	1991 VU_{9}	—	November 4, 1991	Kitt Peak	Spacewatch	·	960 m	MPC · JPL
393350	1992 RN_{1}	—	September 1, 1992	Palomar	E. F. Helin, K. J. Lawrence	T_{j} (2.97)	2.5 km	MPC · JPL
393351	1993 TR_{26}	—	October 9, 1993	La Silla	E. W. Elst	·	2.9 km	MPC · JPL
393352	1995 OA_{14}	—	July 23, 1995	Kitt Peak	Spacewatch	·	1.2 km	MPC · JPL
393353	1995 UA_{11}	—	October 17, 1995	Kitt Peak	Spacewatch	MAR	1.4 km	MPC · JPL
393354	1995 UC_{23}	—	October 19, 1995	Kitt Peak	Spacewatch	EOS	1.8 km	MPC · JPL
393355	1995 UQ_{79}	—	October 19, 1995	Kitt Peak	Spacewatch	·	2.8 km	MPC · JPL
393356	1996 EH_{5}	—	March 11, 1996	Kitt Peak	Spacewatch	·	890 m	MPC · JPL
393357	1997 BZ_{3}	—	January 31, 1997	Kitt Peak	Spacewatch	·	600 m	MPC · JPL
393358	1997 TT_{2}	—	October 3, 1997	Caussols	ODAS	NYS	980 m	MPC · JPL
393359	1998 ME_{3}	—	June 19, 1998	Socorro	LINEAR	AMO	770 m	MPC · JPL
393360	1998 TD_{26}	—	October 14, 1998	Kitt Peak	Spacewatch	·	1.4 km	MPC · JPL
393361	1999 EK_{15}	—	March 10, 1999	Kitt Peak	Spacewatch	·	2.4 km	MPC · JPL
393362	1999 FZ_{15}	—	March 21, 1999	Kitt Peak	Spacewatch	MAS	800 m	MPC · JPL
393363	1999 GU_{10}	—	April 11, 1999	Kitt Peak	Spacewatch	V	570 m	MPC · JPL
393364	1999 RK_{1}	—	September 5, 1999	Catalina	CSS	·	1.1 km	MPC · JPL
393365	1999 RK_{213}	—	September 12, 1999	Bergisch Gladbach	W. Bickel	·	870 m	MPC · JPL
393366	1999 TM_{21}	—	October 9, 1999	Kitt Peak	Spacewatch	MAR	1.2 km	MPC · JPL
393367	1999 TG_{60}	—	October 7, 1999	Kitt Peak	Spacewatch	·	2.5 km	MPC · JPL
393368	1999 TJ_{134}	—	October 6, 1999	Socorro	LINEAR	·	820 m	MPC · JPL
393369	1999 TE_{249}	—	October 9, 1999	Catalina	CSS	·	2.7 km	MPC · JPL
393370	1999 TD_{260}	—	October 9, 1999	Kitt Peak	Spacewatch	·	1.5 km	MPC · JPL
393371	1999 TY_{286}	—	October 10, 1999	Socorro	LINEAR	TIR	3.4 km	MPC · JPL
393372	1999 TP_{317}	—	October 12, 1999	Kitt Peak	Spacewatch	·	2.6 km	MPC · JPL
393373	1999 VB_{46}	—	November 3, 1999	Socorro	LINEAR	BAR	1.6 km	MPC · JPL
393374	1999 VV_{83}	—	November 3, 1999	Kitt Peak	Spacewatch	·	2.7 km	MPC · JPL
393375	1999 VZ_{90}	—	October 10, 1999	Socorro	LINEAR	·	730 m	MPC · JPL
393376	1999 VW_{120}	—	November 4, 1999	Kitt Peak	Spacewatch	·	2.5 km	MPC · JPL
393377	1999 VX_{136}	—	November 12, 1999	Socorro	LINEAR	·	970 m	MPC · JPL
393378	1999 VR_{138}	—	November 9, 1999	Kitt Peak	Spacewatch	·	3.4 km	MPC · JPL
393379	1999 XQ_{47}	—	December 7, 1999	Socorro	LINEAR	·	1.4 km	MPC · JPL
393380	2000 AJ_{213}	—	January 6, 2000	Kitt Peak	Spacewatch	·	1.5 km	MPC · JPL
393381	2000 AL_{219}	—	January 8, 2000	Kitt Peak	Spacewatch	·	820 m	MPC · JPL
393382	2000 BC_{10}	—	January 26, 2000	Kitt Peak	Spacewatch	·	1.5 km	MPC · JPL
393383	2000 CO_{132}	—	January 26, 2000	Kitt Peak	Spacewatch	·	1.5 km	MPC · JPL
393384	2000 FR_{1}	—	March 25, 2000	Kitt Peak	Spacewatch	·	1.7 km	MPC · JPL
393385	2000 GO_{17}	—	April 5, 2000	Socorro	LINEAR	·	1.6 km	MPC · JPL
393386	2000 GL_{121}	—	April 6, 2000	Kitt Peak	Spacewatch	·	1.5 km	MPC · JPL
393387	2000 HU_{28}	—	April 29, 2000	Socorro	LINEAR	PHO	2.9 km	MPC · JPL
393388	2000 OW_{68}	—	July 30, 2000	Cerro Tololo	M. W. Buie	·	1.3 km	MPC · JPL
393389	2000 QG_{2}	—	August 24, 2000	Socorro	LINEAR	·	1.9 km	MPC · JPL
393390	2000 QZ_{46}	—	August 24, 2000	Socorro	LINEAR	·	1.8 km	MPC · JPL
393391	2000 QU_{164}	—	August 31, 2000	Socorro	LINEAR	·	1.1 km	MPC · JPL
393392	2000 QK_{199}	—	August 29, 2000	Socorro	LINEAR	·	1.6 km	MPC · JPL
393393	2000 RN_{19}	—	September 1, 2000	Socorro	LINEAR	·	1.2 km	MPC · JPL
393394	2000 SU_{13}	—	August 31, 2000	Socorro	LINEAR	·	1.1 km	MPC · JPL
393395	2000 SP_{53}	—	September 24, 2000	Socorro	LINEAR	·	3.0 km	MPC · JPL
393396	2000 SH_{56}	—	September 24, 2000	Socorro	LINEAR	·	1.2 km	MPC · JPL
393397	2000 SS_{228}	—	September 28, 2000	Socorro	LINEAR	·	1.3 km	MPC · JPL
393398	2000 SD_{286}	—	September 24, 2000	Socorro	LINEAR	·	1.5 km	MPC · JPL
393399	2000 VM_{44}	—	November 2, 2000	Socorro	LINEAR	·	1.7 km	MPC · JPL
393400	2000 WT_{1}	—	November 17, 2000	Kitt Peak	Spacewatch	·	1.1 km	MPC · JPL

== 393401–393500 ==
back to top

Designation			Discovery			Properties		Ref
Permanent	Provisional	Named after	Date	Site	Discoverer(s)	Category	Diam.	Ref
393401	2000 WH_{150}	—	October 1, 2000	Socorro	LINEAR	·	2.3 km	MPC · JPL
393402	2000 WU_{151}	—	November 29, 2000	Haleakala	NEAT	·	1.9 km	MPC · JPL
393403	2000 WO_{155}	—	November 30, 2000	Socorro	LINEAR	·	1.7 km	MPC · JPL
393404	2000 YP_{8}	—	December 6, 2000	Kitt Peak	Spacewatch	·	1.6 km	MPC · JPL
393405	2000 YA_{76}	—	December 30, 2000	Socorro	LINEAR	·	1.9 km	MPC · JPL
393406	2001 AL_{45}	—	December 30, 2000	Socorro	LINEAR	·	980 m	MPC · JPL
393407	2001 AF_{46}	—	January 15, 2001	Socorro	LINEAR	·	2.1 km	MPC · JPL
393408	2001 BR_{36}	—	January 21, 2001	Socorro	LINEAR	·	1.6 km	MPC · JPL
393409	2001 CY_{20}	—	February 4, 2001	Socorro	LINEAR	·	1.9 km	MPC · JPL
393410	2001 KH_{1}	—	May 17, 2001	Socorro	LINEAR	·	2.9 km	MPC · JPL
393411	2001 OX_{25}	—	July 18, 2001	Haleakala	NEAT	·	2.5 km	MPC · JPL
393412	2001 QE_{48}	—	August 16, 2001	Socorro	LINEAR	·	2.6 km	MPC · JPL
393413	2001 QL_{102}	—	August 19, 2001	Socorro	LINEAR	·	680 m	MPC · JPL
393414	2001 QT_{110}	—	August 24, 2001	Ondřejov	P. Kušnirák, P. Pravec	·	1.8 km	MPC · JPL
393415	2001 QX_{134}	—	August 22, 2001	Socorro	LINEAR	·	1.1 km	MPC · JPL
393416	2001 QC_{146}	—	August 25, 2001	Kitt Peak	Spacewatch	·	730 m	MPC · JPL
393417	2001 QB_{179}	—	August 27, 2001	Palomar	NEAT	·	930 m	MPC · JPL
393418	2001 QA_{250}	—	August 24, 2001	Haleakala	NEAT	V	890 m	MPC · JPL
393419	2001 RS_{18}	—	September 7, 2001	Socorro	LINEAR	·	2.1 km	MPC · JPL
393420	2001 RB_{46}	—	September 9, 2001	Goodricke-Pigott	R. A. Tucker	·	790 m	MPC · JPL
393421	2001 RA_{110}	—	September 12, 2001	Socorro	LINEAR	·	790 m	MPC · JPL
393422	2001 RO_{154}	—	September 11, 2001	Anderson Mesa	LONEOS	·	860 m	MPC · JPL
393423	2001 SE_{8}	—	September 18, 2001	Kitt Peak	Spacewatch	·	970 m	MPC · JPL
393424	2001 SB_{68}	—	September 17, 2001	Socorro	LINEAR	NYS	890 m	MPC · JPL
393425	2001 SJ_{92}	—	September 20, 2001	Socorro	LINEAR	·	1.0 km	MPC · JPL
393426	2001 SE_{120}	—	September 16, 2001	Socorro	LINEAR	·	850 m	MPC · JPL
393427	2001 SK_{123}	—	September 16, 2001	Socorro	LINEAR	PHO	990 m	MPC · JPL
393428	2001 SX_{123}	—	September 16, 2001	Socorro	LINEAR	DOR	3.3 km	MPC · JPL
393429	2001 SF_{155}	—	September 17, 2001	Socorro	LINEAR	·	680 m	MPC · JPL
393430	2001 SX_{167}	—	September 19, 2001	Socorro	LINEAR	·	1.0 km	MPC · JPL
393431	2001 SV_{217}	—	September 19, 2001	Socorro	LINEAR	·	1.8 km	MPC · JPL
393432	2001 SO_{228}	—	September 19, 2001	Socorro	LINEAR	·	950 m	MPC · JPL
393433	2001 SF_{292}	—	September 16, 2001	Socorro	LINEAR	·	1.0 km	MPC · JPL
393434	2001 SU_{297}	—	September 20, 2001	Socorro	LINEAR	·	710 m	MPC · JPL
393435	2001 SC_{321}	—	September 23, 2001	Socorro	LINEAR	·	690 m	MPC · JPL
393436	2001 SU_{321}	—	September 25, 2001	Socorro	LINEAR	·	1.6 km	MPC · JPL
393437	2001 SP_{331}	—	September 19, 2001	Socorro	LINEAR	DOR	1.8 km	MPC · JPL
393438	2001 SX_{332}	—	September 19, 2001	Socorro	LINEAR	·	790 m	MPC · JPL
393439	2001 TT_{117}	—	October 15, 2001	Socorro	LINEAR	·	4.3 km	MPC · JPL
393440	2001 TZ_{149}	—	October 10, 2001	Palomar	NEAT	·	2.2 km	MPC · JPL
393441	2001 TE_{162}	—	October 11, 2001	Palomar	NEAT	·	790 m	MPC · JPL
393442	2001 TQ_{198}	—	October 11, 2001	Socorro	LINEAR	·	2.0 km	MPC · JPL
393443	2001 TG_{200}	—	October 11, 2001	Socorro	LINEAR	·	1.2 km	MPC · JPL
393444	2001 TJ_{204}	—	October 11, 2001	Socorro	LINEAR	·	1.0 km	MPC · JPL
393445	2001 TX_{208}	—	October 12, 2001	Anderson Mesa	LONEOS	·	980 m	MPC · JPL
393446	2001 TC_{231}	—	October 15, 2001	Palomar	NEAT	·	850 m	MPC · JPL
393447	2001 UP_{11}	—	October 13, 2001	Kitt Peak	Spacewatch	H	500 m	MPC · JPL
393448	2001 UK_{42}	—	October 17, 2001	Socorro	LINEAR	·	850 m	MPC · JPL
393449	2001 UD_{124}	—	October 22, 2001	Palomar	NEAT	·	2.3 km	MPC · JPL
393450	2001 UE_{135}	—	October 22, 2001	Socorro	LINEAR	MAS	710 m	MPC · JPL
393451	2001 UZ_{174}	—	October 23, 2001	Palomar	NEAT	·	2.4 km	MPC · JPL
393452	2001 UX_{192}	—	October 18, 2001	Socorro	LINEAR	·	1.5 km	MPC · JPL
393453	2001 UR_{206}	—	October 20, 2001	Socorro	LINEAR	·	2.1 km	MPC · JPL
393454	2001 UL_{231}	—	October 16, 2001	Palomar	NEAT	·	980 m	MPC · JPL
393455	2001 VB_{18}	—	November 9, 2001	Socorro	LINEAR	·	730 m	MPC · JPL
393456	2001 VC_{68}	—	November 11, 2001	Socorro	LINEAR	PHO	1.0 km	MPC · JPL
393457	2001 VJ_{126}	—	November 14, 2001	Kitt Peak	Spacewatch	V	720 m	MPC · JPL
393458	2001 WE_{1}	—	November 17, 2001	Socorro	LINEAR	slow	1.0 km	MPC · JPL
393459	2001 WM_{50}	—	November 17, 2001	Socorro	LINEAR	·	1.1 km	MPC · JPL
393460	2001 XB_{56}	—	December 10, 2001	Socorro	LINEAR	·	1.5 km	MPC · JPL
393461	2001 XL_{171}	—	December 14, 2001	Socorro	LINEAR	V	930 m	MPC · JPL
393462	2001 XN_{231}	—	December 15, 2001	Socorro	LINEAR	·	1.2 km	MPC · JPL
393463	2001 YN_{10}	—	December 17, 2001	Socorro	LINEAR	·	2.5 km	MPC · JPL
393464	2001 YQ_{20}	—	October 14, 2001	Socorro	LINEAR	·	3.9 km	MPC · JPL
393465	2001 YE_{40}	—	December 18, 2001	Socorro	LINEAR	·	950 m	MPC · JPL
393466	2002 AQ_{39}	—	January 9, 2002	Socorro	LINEAR	·	3.1 km	MPC · JPL
393467	2002 AX_{144}	—	January 13, 2002	Socorro	LINEAR	V	740 m	MPC · JPL
393468	2002 AB_{209}	—	January 12, 2002	Palomar	NEAT	·	830 m	MPC · JPL
393469	2002 AY_{209}	—	January 13, 2002	Kitt Peak	Spacewatch	V	1.0 km	MPC · JPL
393470	2002 CR_{85}	—	February 7, 2002	Socorro	LINEAR	·	2.5 km	MPC · JPL
393471	2002 CF_{198}	—	February 10, 2002	Socorro	LINEAR	·	3.5 km	MPC · JPL
393472	2002 CM_{245}	—	January 14, 2002	Kitt Peak	Spacewatch	·	3.2 km	MPC · JPL
393473	2002 CF_{265}	—	January 13, 2002	Kitt Peak	Spacewatch	·	2.6 km	MPC · JPL
393474	2002 EQ_{161}	—	March 6, 2002	Palomar	NEAT	L4	10 km	MPC · JPL
393475	2002 GP_{130}	—	April 12, 2002	Socorro	LINEAR	·	1 km	MPC · JPL
393476	2002 GT_{189}	—	March 12, 2002	Kitt Peak	Spacewatch	·	3.2 km	MPC · JPL
393477	2002 JB_{16}	—	May 1, 2002	Palomar	NEAT	·	1.3 km	MPC · JPL
393478	2002 JN_{67}	—	May 10, 2002	Palomar	NEAT	·	1.5 km	MPC · JPL
393479	2002 MO_{5}	—	June 28, 2002	Palomar	NEAT	·	1.5 km	MPC · JPL
393480	2002 ML_{6}	—	June 24, 2002	Palomar	NEAT	·	1.2 km	MPC · JPL
393481	2002 NR_{36}	—	July 9, 2002	Socorro	LINEAR	EUN	1.3 km	MPC · JPL
393482	2002 PQ_{1}	—	August 4, 2002	Reedy Creek	J. Broughton	·	1.8 km	MPC · JPL
393483	2002 PW_{42}	—	August 10, 2002	Socorro	LINEAR	·	1.5 km	MPC · JPL
393484	2002 PZ_{71}	—	August 12, 2002	Socorro	LINEAR	·	1.4 km	MPC · JPL
393485	2002 PB_{80}	—	August 4, 2002	Palomar	NEAT	·	1.6 km	MPC · JPL
393486	2002 PQ_{80}	—	August 11, 2002	Palomar	NEAT	·	1.3 km	MPC · JPL
393487	2002 PC_{83}	—	August 10, 2002	Socorro	LINEAR	·	2.6 km	MPC · JPL
393488	2002 PN_{133}	—	August 14, 2002	Socorro	LINEAR	·	1.4 km	MPC · JPL
393489	2002 PD_{176}	—	August 7, 2002	Palomar	NEAT	·	1.9 km	MPC · JPL
393490	2002 PC_{188}	—	August 8, 2002	Palomar	NEAT	·	1.4 km	MPC · JPL
393491	2002 PA_{192}	—	August 15, 2002	Palomar	NEAT	·	1.3 km	MPC · JPL
393492	2002 QN_{10}	—	August 25, 2002	Palomar	NEAT	·	1.0 km	MPC · JPL
393493	2002 QX_{26}	—	August 28, 2002	Socorro	LINEAR	·	2.0 km	MPC · JPL
393494	2002 QU_{58}	—	August 31, 2002	Needville	Needville	BRG	1.6 km	MPC · JPL
393495	2002 QP_{67}	—	August 30, 2002	Palomar	NEAT	·	2.0 km	MPC · JPL
393496	2002 QU_{81}	—	August 19, 2002	Palomar	NEAT	·	1.2 km	MPC · JPL
393497	2002 QS_{92}	—	August 19, 2002	Palomar	NEAT	WIT	950 m	MPC · JPL
393498	2002 QQ_{125}	—	August 29, 2002	Palomar	NEAT	·	1.4 km	MPC · JPL
393499	2002 QD_{153}	—	October 22, 1998	Caussols	ODAS	·	1.3 km	MPC · JPL
393500	2002 RQ_{22}	—	September 4, 2002	Anderson Mesa	LONEOS	·	1.7 km	MPC · JPL

== 393501–393600 ==
back to top

Designation			Discovery			Properties		Ref
Permanent	Provisional	Named after	Date	Site	Discoverer(s)	Category	Diam.	Ref
393501	2002 RF_{23}	—	August 31, 2002	Kitt Peak	Spacewatch	(5)	1.4 km	MPC · JPL
393502	2002 RX_{85}	—	September 5, 2002	Socorro	LINEAR	·	1.7 km	MPC · JPL
393503	2002 RE_{103}	—	September 5, 2002	Socorro	LINEAR	·	1.6 km	MPC · JPL
393504	2002 RC_{139}	—	September 10, 2002	Palomar	NEAT	·	840 m	MPC · JPL
393505	2002 RW_{141}	—	September 10, 2002	Haleakala	NEAT	MAR	1.2 km	MPC · JPL
393506	2002 RZ_{193}	—	September 12, 2002	Palomar	NEAT	·	1.6 km	MPC · JPL
393507	2002 RL_{225}	—	September 13, 2002	Palomar	NEAT	·	1.2 km	MPC · JPL
393508	2002 RT_{261}	—	September 5, 2002	Socorro	LINEAR	·	1.2 km	MPC · JPL
393509	2002 SA	—	September 16, 2002	Palomar	NEAT	·	1.6 km	MPC · JPL
393510	2002 SK_{4}	—	September 27, 2002	Palomar	NEAT	·	1.7 km	MPC · JPL
393511	2002 SR_{16}	—	September 27, 2002	Needville	P. G. A. Garossino, L. Casady	·	1.4 km	MPC · JPL
393512	2002 SW_{20}	—	September 26, 2002	Palomar	NEAT	·	1.5 km	MPC · JPL
393513	2002 SH_{48}	—	September 30, 2002	Socorro	LINEAR	·	1.7 km	MPC · JPL
393514	2002 SK_{56}	—	September 30, 2002	Socorro	LINEAR	EUN	1.7 km	MPC · JPL
393515	2002 SG_{61}	—	September 16, 2002	Palomar	NEAT	·	1.9 km	MPC · JPL
393516	2002 TJ_{31}	—	October 2, 2002	Socorro	LINEAR	DOR	2.7 km	MPC · JPL
393517	2002 TK_{32}	—	October 2, 2002	Socorro	LINEAR	·	1.9 km	MPC · JPL
393518	2002 TC_{37}	—	October 2, 2002	Socorro	LINEAR	·	1.1 km	MPC · JPL
393519	2002 TC_{84}	—	October 2, 2002	Haleakala	NEAT	·	1.6 km	MPC · JPL
393520	2002 TD_{87}	—	September 6, 2002	Socorro	LINEAR	JUN	960 m	MPC · JPL
393521	2002 TN_{94}	—	October 3, 2002	Socorro	LINEAR	·	600 m	MPC · JPL
393522	2002 TJ_{111}	—	October 2, 2002	Campo Imperatore	CINEOS	·	2.0 km	MPC · JPL
393523	2002 TO_{148}	—	August 30, 2002	Anderson Mesa	LONEOS	·	1.8 km	MPC · JPL
393524	2002 TR_{158}	—	October 5, 2002	Palomar	NEAT	·	1.7 km	MPC · JPL
393525	2002 TN_{176}	—	October 5, 2002	Palomar	NEAT	JUN	2.8 km	MPC · JPL
393526	2002 TW_{176}	—	October 5, 2002	Socorro	LINEAR	PHO	1.1 km	MPC · JPL
393527	2002 TY_{186}	—	October 4, 2002	Socorro	LINEAR	·	2.3 km	MPC · JPL
393528	2002 TE_{193}	—	October 3, 2002	Palomar	NEAT	EUN	1.2 km	MPC · JPL
393529	2002 TK_{218}	—	September 7, 2002	Socorro	LINEAR	·	2.7 km	MPC · JPL
393530	2002 TP_{224}	—	October 2, 2002	Socorro	LINEAR	·	2.3 km	MPC · JPL
393531	2002 TE_{267}	—	October 10, 2002	Socorro	LINEAR	H	690 m	MPC · JPL
393532	2002 TH_{306}	—	October 4, 2002	Apache Point	SDSS	GEF	1.3 km	MPC · JPL
393533	2002 TJ_{309}	—	October 4, 2002	Apache Point	SDSS	·	1.7 km	MPC · JPL
393534	2002 TA_{342}	—	October 5, 2002	Apache Point	SDSS	EUN ·	2.3 km	MPC · JPL
393535	2002 TE_{371}	—	October 10, 2002	Apache Point	SDSS	·	1.8 km	MPC · JPL
393536	2002 UW_{6}	—	October 28, 2002	Palomar	NEAT	·	2.0 km	MPC · JPL
393537	2002 UL_{8}	—	October 28, 2002	Palomar	NEAT	EUN	1.7 km	MPC · JPL
393538	2002 UE_{13}	—	October 28, 2002	Haleakala	NEAT	·	960 m	MPC · JPL
393539	2002 UW_{38}	—	October 31, 2002	Palomar	NEAT	·	2.0 km	MPC · JPL
393540	2002 UQ_{74}	—	October 30, 2002	Palomar	NEAT	·	760 m	MPC · JPL
393541	2002 VL_{13}	—	October 28, 2002	Kitt Peak	Spacewatch	(18466)	2.5 km	MPC · JPL
393542	2002 VF_{28}	—	November 5, 2002	Anderson Mesa	LONEOS	·	1.9 km	MPC · JPL
393543	2002 VV_{96}	—	November 11, 2002	Socorro	LINEAR	·	670 m	MPC · JPL
393544	2002 VF_{103}	—	November 12, 2002	Socorro	LINEAR	·	1.6 km	MPC · JPL
393545	2002 VG_{115}	—	November 11, 2002	Socorro	LINEAR	·	610 m	MPC · JPL
393546	2002 VW_{126}	—	November 13, 2002	Palomar	NEAT	·	3.0 km	MPC · JPL
393547	2002 WA_{5}	—	November 24, 2002	Palomar	NEAT	·	2.6 km	MPC · JPL
393548	2002 XF_{63}	—	December 11, 2002	Socorro	LINEAR	GEF	1.6 km	MPC · JPL
393549	2002 XH_{120}	—	December 3, 2002	Palomar	NEAT	·	1.9 km	MPC · JPL
393550	2003 AF_{72}	—	January 11, 2003	Socorro	LINEAR	·	910 m	MPC · JPL
393551	2003 BG_{23}	—	January 25, 2003	Palomar	NEAT	·	3.0 km	MPC · JPL
393552	2003 BP_{56}	—	January 30, 2003	Anderson Mesa	LONEOS	·	2.0 km	MPC · JPL
393553	2003 CA_{16}	—	February 4, 2003	Haleakala	NEAT	·	1.8 km	MPC · JPL
393554	2003 DJ_{20}	—	February 22, 2003	Palomar	NEAT	·	3.5 km	MPC · JPL
393555	2003 FA_{28}	—	March 24, 2003	Kitt Peak	Spacewatch	·	2.1 km	MPC · JPL
393556	2003 FK_{34}	—	March 23, 2003	Kitt Peak	Spacewatch	·	840 m	MPC · JPL
393557	2003 FK_{35}	—	March 23, 2003	Kitt Peak	Spacewatch	·	1.2 km	MPC · JPL
393558	2003 GP_{31}	—	April 8, 2003	Kitt Peak	Spacewatch	·	2.3 km	MPC · JPL
393559	2003 GO_{33}	—	April 3, 2003	Cerro Tololo	Deep Lens Survey	·	3.1 km	MPC · JPL
393560	2003 GK_{46}	—	April 8, 2003	Palomar	NEAT	·	3.0 km	MPC · JPL
393561	2003 HZ_{6}	—	April 24, 2003	Kitt Peak	Spacewatch	·	2.9 km	MPC · JPL
393562	2003 HT_{17}	—	April 25, 2003	Kitt Peak	Spacewatch	·	3.7 km	MPC · JPL
393563	2003 HR_{19}	—	April 26, 2003	Kitt Peak	Spacewatch	·	3.7 km	MPC · JPL
393564	2003 HP_{43}	—	April 30, 2003	Kitt Peak	Spacewatch	·	2.5 km	MPC · JPL
393565	2003 JK	—	May 1, 2003	Kitt Peak	Spacewatch	·	2.4 km	MPC · JPL
393566	2003 JR_{3}	—	May 2, 2003	Kitt Peak	Spacewatch	·	3.9 km	MPC · JPL
393567	2003 JL_{8}	—	May 2, 2003	Socorro	LINEAR	ERI	1.8 km	MPC · JPL
393568	2003 JY_{10}	—	May 4, 2003	Kleť	J. Tichá, M. Tichý	H	580 m	MPC · JPL
393569	2003 JC_{13}	—	May 7, 2003	Kitt Peak	Spacewatch	APO	550 m	MPC · JPL
393570	2003 JS_{15}	—	May 6, 2003	Kitt Peak	Spacewatch	HYG	2.6 km	MPC · JPL
393571	2003 KA_{2}	—	May 1, 2003	Kitt Peak	Spacewatch	·	3.1 km	MPC · JPL
393572	2003 KF_{8}	—	May 23, 2003	Kitt Peak	Spacewatch	·	2.8 km	MPC · JPL
393573	2003 KT_{10}	—	May 26, 2003	Kitt Peak	Spacewatch	·	2.8 km	MPC · JPL
393574	2003 KJ_{31}	—	May 26, 2003	Kitt Peak	Spacewatch	·	3.4 km	MPC · JPL
393575	2003 QE_{12}	—	August 22, 2003	Socorro	LINEAR	·	1.3 km	MPC · JPL
393576	2003 RC_{18}	—	September 15, 2003	Palomar	NEAT	·	1.9 km	MPC · JPL
393577	2003 RR_{19}	—	September 15, 2003	Anderson Mesa	LONEOS	·	1.2 km	MPC · JPL
393578	2003 SQ_{30}	—	September 18, 2003	Kitt Peak	Spacewatch	RAF	950 m	MPC · JPL
393579	2003 SQ_{120}	—	September 17, 2003	Socorro	LINEAR	·	1.1 km	MPC · JPL
393580	2003 SO_{188}	—	September 22, 2003	Anderson Mesa	LONEOS	·	790 m	MPC · JPL
393581	2003 SU_{192}	—	September 7, 2003	Socorro	LINEAR	·	1.3 km	MPC · JPL
393582	2003 SH_{205}	—	September 23, 2003	Haleakala	NEAT	·	950 m	MPC · JPL
393583	2003 SM_{218}	—	September 28, 2003	Desert Eagle	W. K. Y. Yeung	EUN	1.0 km	MPC · JPL
393584	2003 SF_{251}	—	September 26, 2003	Socorro	LINEAR	·	2.1 km	MPC · JPL
393585	2003 SF_{253}	—	September 27, 2003	Kitt Peak	Spacewatch	(5)	1.4 km	MPC · JPL
393586	2003 SZ_{276}	—	September 30, 2003	Socorro	LINEAR	·	1.6 km	MPC · JPL
393587	2003 SB_{338}	—	September 23, 2003	Palomar	NEAT	BRG	1.6 km	MPC · JPL
393588	2003 SS_{355}	—	September 28, 2003	Socorro	LINEAR	·	1.6 km	MPC · JPL
393589	2003 SC_{395}	—	September 26, 2003	Apache Point	SDSS	·	1.2 km	MPC · JPL
393590	2003 SJ_{401}	—	September 26, 2003	Apache Point	SDSS	·	1.5 km	MPC · JPL
393591	2003 SK_{407}	—	September 27, 2003	Apache Point	SDSS	·	1.3 km	MPC · JPL
393592	2003 TG_{49}	—	October 3, 2003	Kitt Peak	Spacewatch	·	2.0 km	MPC · JPL
393593	2003 UJ_{22}	—	October 21, 2003	Socorro	LINEAR	·	1.7 km	MPC · JPL
393594	2003 UV_{64}	—	October 1, 2003	Anderson Mesa	LONEOS	(1547)	1.9 km	MPC · JPL
393595	2003 UW_{94}	—	October 18, 2003	Kitt Peak	Spacewatch	·	1.1 km	MPC · JPL
393596	2003 US_{96}	—	October 19, 2003	Kitt Peak	Spacewatch	·	1.2 km	MPC · JPL
393597	2003 UD_{127}	—	October 21, 2003	Kitt Peak	Spacewatch	·	1.8 km	MPC · JPL
393598	2003 UF_{154}	—	October 20, 2003	Kitt Peak	Spacewatch	·	1.3 km	MPC · JPL
393599	2003 UL_{168}	—	October 22, 2003	Socorro	LINEAR	·	1.0 km	MPC · JPL
393600	2003 UM_{194}	—	September 28, 2003	Anderson Mesa	LONEOS	MAR	1.5 km	MPC · JPL

== 393601–393700 ==
back to top

Designation			Discovery			Properties		Ref
Permanent	Provisional	Named after	Date	Site	Discoverer(s)	Category	Diam.	Ref
393601	2003 UD_{204}	—	October 21, 2003	Kitt Peak	Spacewatch	·	1.5 km	MPC · JPL
393602	2003 UV_{229}	—	October 23, 2003	Anderson Mesa	LONEOS	·	1.6 km	MPC · JPL
393603	2003 UQ_{279}	—	September 28, 2003	Haleakala	NEAT	·	1.8 km	MPC · JPL
393604	2003 UP_{298}	—	October 16, 2003	Kitt Peak	Spacewatch	·	1.4 km	MPC · JPL
393605	2003 UH_{322}	—	October 16, 2003	Kitt Peak	Spacewatch	(5)	1.1 km	MPC · JPL
393606	2003 UA_{357}	—	October 19, 2003	Kitt Peak	Spacewatch	·	1.0 km	MPC · JPL
393607	2003 WX_{60}	—	November 19, 2003	Kitt Peak	Spacewatch	(5)	1.2 km	MPC · JPL
393608	2003 WN_{85}	—	November 20, 2003	Kitt Peak	Spacewatch	·	2.2 km	MPC · JPL
393609	2003 WS_{160}	—	November 30, 2003	Kitt Peak	Spacewatch	·	1.2 km	MPC · JPL
393610	2003 WD_{172}	—	November 30, 2003	Socorro	LINEAR	·	1.8 km	MPC · JPL
393611	2003 XN_{28}	—	November 19, 2003	Kitt Peak	Spacewatch	·	2.0 km	MPC · JPL
393612	2003 YU_{40}	—	December 19, 2003	Kitt Peak	Spacewatch	EUN	1.4 km	MPC · JPL
393613	2003 YN_{60}	—	November 24, 2003	Kitt Peak	Spacewatch	·	1.9 km	MPC · JPL
393614	2003 YW_{77}	—	December 18, 2003	Socorro	LINEAR	GEF	1.3 km	MPC · JPL
393615	2004 BZ_{31}	—	January 19, 2004	Kitt Peak	Spacewatch	·	1.7 km	MPC · JPL
393616	2004 BH_{127}	—	January 16, 2004	Kitt Peak	Spacewatch	MRX	1.2 km	MPC · JPL
393617	2004 BP_{142}	—	January 19, 2004	Kitt Peak	Spacewatch	·	530 m	MPC · JPL
393618	2004 BC_{156}	—	January 28, 2004	Kitt Peak	Spacewatch	·	1.9 km	MPC · JPL
393619	2004 DU_{47}	—	February 19, 2004	Socorro	LINEAR	·	1.0 km	MPC · JPL
393620	2004 DZ_{56}	—	February 22, 2004	Kitt Peak	Spacewatch	·	1.9 km	MPC · JPL
393621	2004 EM_{26}	—	March 14, 2004	Kitt Peak	Spacewatch	·	1.8 km	MPC · JPL
393622	2004 ES_{26}	—	March 14, 2004	Kitt Peak	Spacewatch	·	720 m	MPC · JPL
393623	2004 FQ_{1}	—	March 16, 2004	Kitt Peak	Spacewatch	·	930 m	MPC · JPL
393624	2004 FV_{3}	—	March 19, 2004	Socorro	LINEAR	H	410 m	MPC · JPL
393625	2004 FV_{28}	—	March 27, 2004	Socorro	LINEAR	H	510 m	MPC · JPL
393626	2004 FM_{75}	—	March 17, 2004	Kitt Peak	Spacewatch	·	1.9 km	MPC · JPL
393627	2004 GZ_{16}	—	April 10, 2004	Palomar	NEAT	·	3.8 km	MPC · JPL
393628	2004 GN_{49}	—	April 12, 2004	Kitt Peak	Spacewatch	·	1.8 km	MPC · JPL
393629	2004 GE_{63}	—	April 13, 2004	Kitt Peak	Spacewatch	·	690 m	MPC · JPL
393630	2004 GZ_{76}	—	April 13, 2004	Catalina	CSS	H	730 m	MPC · JPL
393631	2004 HQ_{57}	—	April 21, 2004	Kitt Peak	Spacewatch	·	2.7 km	MPC · JPL
393632	2004 JS_{42}	—	May 15, 2004	Socorro	LINEAR	·	760 m	MPC · JPL
393633	2004 KM_{7}	—	May 20, 2004	Kitt Peak	Spacewatch	·	480 m	MPC · JPL
393634	2004 LA_{20}	—	June 11, 2004	Kitt Peak	Spacewatch	·	820 m	MPC · JPL
393635	2004 LP_{28}	—	June 14, 2004	Kitt Peak	Spacewatch	·	3.0 km	MPC · JPL
393636	2004 NQ_{1}	—	July 9, 2004	Socorro	LINEAR	·	1.3 km	MPC · JPL
393637	2004 NL_{12}	—	July 11, 2004	Socorro	LINEAR	·	2.2 km	MPC · JPL
393638	2004 NJ_{27}	—	July 11, 2004	Socorro	LINEAR	·	930 m	MPC · JPL
393639	2004 NG_{29}	—	July 14, 2004	Socorro	LINEAR	TIR	3.2 km	MPC · JPL
393640	2004 PY_{14}	—	August 7, 2004	Palomar	NEAT	·	1.5 km	MPC · JPL
393641	2004 PG_{18}	—	August 8, 2004	Anderson Mesa	LONEOS	·	730 m	MPC · JPL
393642	2004 PJ_{23}	—	August 8, 2004	Socorro	LINEAR	·	3.4 km	MPC · JPL
393643	2004 PB_{24}	—	July 17, 2004	Socorro	LINEAR	H	580 m	MPC · JPL
393644	2004 PH_{26}	—	August 8, 2004	Socorro	LINEAR	·	950 m	MPC · JPL
393645	2004 PM_{32}	—	August 8, 2004	Socorro	LINEAR	·	760 m	MPC · JPL
393646	2004 PW_{33}	—	August 8, 2004	Anderson Mesa	LONEOS	NYS	1.1 km	MPC · JPL
393647	2004 PC_{39}	—	August 9, 2004	Socorro	LINEAR	·	2.5 km	MPC · JPL
393648	2004 PP_{81}	—	August 10, 2004	Socorro	LINEAR	·	1.0 km	MPC · JPL
393649	2004 PU_{91}	—	August 12, 2004	Socorro	LINEAR	·	1.0 km	MPC · JPL
393650	2004 PC_{107}	—	August 15, 2004	Palomar	NEAT	·	6.6 km	MPC · JPL
393651	2004 PS_{111}	—	August 9, 2004	Socorro	LINEAR	H	640 m	MPC · JPL
393652	2004 PN_{116}	—	August 12, 2004	Mauna Kea	P. A. Wiegert	URS	3.6 km	MPC · JPL
393653	2004 QJ_{5}	—	August 21, 2004	Reedy Creek	J. Broughton	·	1.5 km	MPC · JPL
393654	2004 QH_{14}	—	August 20, 2004	Socorro	LINEAR	TIR	3.0 km	MPC · JPL
393655	2004 RP	—	September 3, 2004	Palomar	NEAT	·	5.2 km	MPC · JPL
393656	2004 RJ_{6}	—	September 4, 2004	Palomar	NEAT	THB	6.9 km	MPC · JPL
393657	2004 RS_{9}	—	September 6, 2004	Socorro	LINEAR	PHO	680 m	MPC · JPL
393658	2004 RJ_{12}	—	August 21, 2004	Catalina	CSS	H	710 m	MPC · JPL
393659	2004 RR_{16}	—	September 7, 2004	Socorro	LINEAR	·	750 m	MPC · JPL
393660	2004 RM_{17}	—	September 7, 2004	Socorro	LINEAR	·	1.8 km	MPC · JPL
393661	2004 RP_{21}	—	September 7, 2004	Kitt Peak	Spacewatch	·	720 m	MPC · JPL
393662	2004 RH_{32}	—	September 7, 2004	Socorro	LINEAR	·	4.4 km	MPC · JPL
393663	2004 RT_{41}	—	September 7, 2004	Kitt Peak	Spacewatch	MAS	730 m	MPC · JPL
393664	2004 RK_{45}	—	September 8, 2004	Socorro	LINEAR	HYG	3.1 km	MPC · JPL
393665	2004 RF_{55}	—	September 8, 2004	Socorro	LINEAR	·	1.2 km	MPC · JPL
393666	2004 RU_{60}	—	August 11, 2004	Socorro	LINEAR	·	1.0 km	MPC · JPL
393667	2004 RZ_{66}	—	September 8, 2004	Socorro	LINEAR	·	3.4 km	MPC · JPL
393668	2004 RT_{69}	—	September 8, 2004	Socorro	LINEAR	·	2.3 km	MPC · JPL
393669	2004 RQ_{93}	—	September 8, 2004	Socorro	LINEAR	·	3.2 km	MPC · JPL
393670	2004 RM_{105}	—	September 8, 2004	Palomar	NEAT	·	4.0 km	MPC · JPL
393671	2004 RP_{109}	—	August 20, 2004	Catalina	CSS	H	490 m	MPC · JPL
393672	2004 RV_{114}	—	September 7, 2004	Socorro	LINEAR	·	1.2 km	MPC · JPL
393673	2004 RP_{158}	—	September 10, 2004	Socorro	LINEAR	V	590 m	MPC · JPL
393674	2004 RX_{171}	—	September 9, 2004	Socorro	LINEAR	T_{j} (2.97)	4.1 km	MPC · JPL
393675	2004 RS_{187}	—	September 10, 2004	Socorro	LINEAR	TIR	3.0 km	MPC · JPL
393676	2004 RB_{198}	—	September 10, 2004	Socorro	LINEAR	H	600 m	MPC · JPL
393677	2004 RO_{218}	—	September 11, 2004	Socorro	LINEAR	·	5.1 km	MPC · JPL
393678	2004 RF_{230}	—	September 9, 2004	Kitt Peak	Spacewatch	MAS	680 m	MPC · JPL
393679	2004 RS_{247}	—	September 12, 2004	Socorro	LINEAR	·	4.1 km	MPC · JPL
393680	2004 RA_{248}	—	July 14, 2004	Socorro	LINEAR	·	3.7 km	MPC · JPL
393681	2004 RV_{251}	—	August 15, 2004	Siding Spring	SSS	MAS	780 m	MPC · JPL
393682	2004 RO_{275}	—	September 13, 2004	Kitt Peak	Spacewatch	V	590 m	MPC · JPL
393683	2004 RX_{302}	—	September 11, 2004	Kitt Peak	Spacewatch	V	570 m	MPC · JPL
393684	2004 RZ_{327}	—	September 15, 2004	Anderson Mesa	LONEOS	·	2.9 km	MPC · JPL
393685	2004 RC_{357}	—	September 15, 2004	Siding Spring	SSS	THB	3.4 km	MPC · JPL
393686	2004 SR_{2}	—	September 17, 2004	Socorro	LINEAR	PHO	810 m	MPC · JPL
393687	2004 SW_{20}	—	September 18, 2004	Socorro	LINEAR	H	470 m	MPC · JPL
393688	2004 SZ_{22}	—	September 17, 2004	Kitt Peak	Spacewatch	V	810 m	MPC · JPL
393689	2004 ST_{28}	—	September 17, 2004	Socorro	LINEAR	·	750 m	MPC · JPL
393690	2004 SM_{29}	—	September 17, 2004	Socorro	LINEAR	·	4.2 km	MPC · JPL
393691	2004 TU_{2}	—	September 15, 2004	Kitt Peak	Spacewatch	NYS	1.1 km	MPC · JPL
393692	2004 TB_{9}	—	September 22, 2004	Kitt Peak	Spacewatch	H	570 m	MPC · JPL
393693	2004 TJ_{22}	—	October 4, 2004	Kitt Peak	Spacewatch	·	1.2 km	MPC · JPL
393694	2004 TU_{32}	—	October 4, 2004	Kitt Peak	Spacewatch	·	1.1 km	MPC · JPL
393695	2004 TA_{36}	—	August 26, 2004	Catalina	CSS	·	1.4 km	MPC · JPL
393696	2004 TJ_{40}	—	September 24, 2004	Kitt Peak	Spacewatch	·	680 m	MPC · JPL
393697	2004 TV_{62}	—	September 17, 2004	Kitt Peak	Spacewatch	·	990 m	MPC · JPL
393698	2004 TS_{77}	—	September 21, 2004	Socorro	LINEAR	H	600 m	MPC · JPL
393699	2004 TB_{98}	—	September 17, 2004	Kitt Peak	Spacewatch	·	3.3 km	MPC · JPL
393700	2004 TC_{115}	—	October 6, 2004	Kitt Peak	Spacewatch	·	1.0 km	MPC · JPL

== 393701–393800 ==
back to top

Designation			Discovery			Properties		Ref
Permanent	Provisional	Named after	Date	Site	Discoverer(s)	Category	Diam.	Ref
393701	2004 TK_{115}	—	October 4, 2004	Kitt Peak	Spacewatch	·	1.5 km	MPC · JPL
393702	2004 TO_{119}	—	October 6, 2004	Palomar	NEAT	·	3.0 km	MPC · JPL
393703	2004 TA_{152}	—	October 6, 2004	Kitt Peak	Spacewatch	·	760 m	MPC · JPL
393704	2004 TF_{154}	—	September 23, 2004	Kitt Peak	Spacewatch	·	1.1 km	MPC · JPL
393705	2004 TE_{163}	—	October 6, 2004	Kitt Peak	Spacewatch	·	1.1 km	MPC · JPL
393706	2004 TS_{163}	—	October 6, 2004	Kitt Peak	Spacewatch	NYS	1.1 km	MPC · JPL
393707	2004 TH_{172}	—	October 8, 2004	Socorro	LINEAR	EUP	6.0 km	MPC · JPL
393708	2004 TM_{177}	—	October 6, 2004	Kitt Peak	Spacewatch	MAS	680 m	MPC · JPL
393709	2004 TD_{182}	—	October 7, 2004	Kitt Peak	Spacewatch	THM	2.4 km	MPC · JPL
393710	2004 TJ_{219}	—	October 5, 2004	Kitt Peak	Spacewatch	EUP	3.0 km	MPC · JPL
393711	2004 TL_{222}	—	October 7, 2004	Socorro	LINEAR	·	1.5 km	MPC · JPL
393712	2004 TS_{255}	—	October 9, 2004	Kitt Peak	Spacewatch	·	1.4 km	MPC · JPL
393713	2004 TV_{268}	—	October 9, 2004	Kitt Peak	Spacewatch	V	820 m	MPC · JPL
393714	2004 TJ_{285}	—	September 7, 2004	Kitt Peak	Spacewatch	NYS	1.1 km	MPC · JPL
393715	2004 TQ_{287}	—	October 9, 2004	Socorro	LINEAR	·	1.3 km	MPC · JPL
393716	2004 TK_{337}	—	October 12, 2004	Kitt Peak	Spacewatch	TIR	2.7 km	MPC · JPL
393717	2004 UX_{8}	—	October 23, 2004	Socorro	LINEAR	H	720 m	MPC · JPL
393718	2004 VJ_{18}	—	November 4, 2004	Kitt Peak	Spacewatch	NYS	1.1 km	MPC · JPL
393719	2004 VS_{28}	—	November 7, 2004	Socorro	LINEAR	H	610 m	MPC · JPL
393720	2004 VY_{31}	—	October 15, 2004	Kitt Peak	Spacewatch	·	1.5 km	MPC · JPL
393721	2004 VE_{80}	—	November 3, 2004	Kitt Peak	Spacewatch	PHO	1.0 km	MPC · JPL
393722	2004 VL_{83}	—	October 15, 2004	Mount Lemmon	Mount Lemmon Survey	MAS	730 m	MPC · JPL
393723	2004 XY_{7}	—	December 2, 2004	Palomar	NEAT	·	1.3 km	MPC · JPL
393724	2004 XB_{21}	—	December 8, 2004	Socorro	LINEAR	·	1.5 km	MPC · JPL
393725	2004 XC_{26}	—	December 9, 2004	Kitt Peak	Spacewatch	·	1.4 km	MPC · JPL
393726	2004 XS_{58}	—	December 10, 2004	Kitt Peak	Spacewatch	·	1.3 km	MPC · JPL
393727	2004 XL_{136}	—	December 15, 2004	Socorro	LINEAR	·	1.5 km	MPC · JPL
393728	2004 XX_{160}	—	December 14, 2004	Kitt Peak	Spacewatch	·	1.5 km	MPC · JPL
393729	2004 XC_{169}	—	December 9, 2004	Kitt Peak	Spacewatch	·	870 m	MPC · JPL
393730	2004 YG_{6}	—	December 16, 2004	Kitt Peak	Spacewatch	·	1.4 km	MPC · JPL
393731	2004 YJ_{20}	—	December 18, 2004	Mount Lemmon	Mount Lemmon Survey	·	1.3 km	MPC · JPL
393732	2005 AO_{29}	—	January 15, 2005	Anderson Mesa	LONEOS	·	2.1 km	MPC · JPL
393733	2005 AV_{71}	—	January 15, 2005	Kitt Peak	Spacewatch	·	1.1 km	MPC · JPL
393734	2005 BM_{6}	—	January 16, 2005	Socorro	LINEAR	·	2.6 km	MPC · JPL
393735	2005 BJ_{8}	—	January 16, 2005	Socorro	LINEAR	·	1.8 km	MPC · JPL
393736	2005 BN_{10}	—	January 16, 2005	Socorro	LINEAR	(5)	1.3 km	MPC · JPL
393737	2005 BN_{19}	—	January 16, 2005	Socorro	LINEAR	·	2.1 km	MPC · JPL
393738	2005 CR_{8}	—	December 20, 2004	Mount Lemmon	Mount Lemmon Survey	·	2.0 km	MPC · JPL
393739	2005 CD_{26}	—	February 1, 2005	Catalina	CSS	·	1.6 km	MPC · JPL
393740	2005 CC_{30}	—	February 1, 2005	Kitt Peak	Spacewatch	3:2 · SHU	7.4 km	MPC · JPL
393741	2005 CM_{58}	—	January 9, 2005	Campo Imperatore	CINEOS	·	1.4 km	MPC · JPL
393742	2005 CT_{60}	—	February 4, 2005	Mount Lemmon	Mount Lemmon Survey	(5)	1.3 km	MPC · JPL
393743	2005 CU_{65}	—	February 9, 2005	Kitt Peak	Spacewatch	·	1.7 km	MPC · JPL
393744	2005 CB_{71}	—	February 1, 2005	Kitt Peak	Spacewatch	·	1.3 km	MPC · JPL
393745	2005 ER_{71}	—	March 2, 2005	Catalina	CSS	·	1.8 km	MPC · JPL
393746	2005 EF_{133}	—	March 9, 2005	Catalina	CSS	MAR	1.4 km	MPC · JPL
393747	2005 ET_{136}	—	March 9, 2005	Mount Lemmon	Mount Lemmon Survey	·	1.7 km	MPC · JPL
393748	2005 EC_{141}	—	March 10, 2005	Catalina	CSS	·	1.7 km	MPC · JPL
393749	2005 EL_{167}	—	March 11, 2005	Mount Lemmon	Mount Lemmon Survey	fast	1.2 km	MPC · JPL
393750	2005 EU_{187}	—	March 10, 2005	Mount Lemmon	Mount Lemmon Survey	·	1.3 km	MPC · JPL
393751	2005 EX_{215}	—	March 8, 2005	Anderson Mesa	LONEOS	·	1.6 km	MPC · JPL
393752	2005 EZ_{221}	—	March 4, 2005	Kitt Peak	Spacewatch	MIS	2.7 km	MPC · JPL
393753	2005 EV_{223}	—	March 13, 2005	Catalina	CSS	·	1.8 km	MPC · JPL
393754	2005 EA_{224}	—	March 15, 2005	New Milford	Milford, New	ADE	1.9 km	MPC · JPL
393755	2005 EX_{252}	—	March 10, 2005	Mount Lemmon	Mount Lemmon Survey	·	2.4 km	MPC · JPL
393756	2005 EL_{258}	—	March 11, 2005	Mount Lemmon	Mount Lemmon Survey	·	2.3 km	MPC · JPL
393757	2005 EV_{259}	—	March 11, 2005	Mount Lemmon	Mount Lemmon Survey	·	1.5 km	MPC · JPL
393758	2005 EZ_{266}	—	March 13, 2005	Kitt Peak	Spacewatch	·	1.7 km	MPC · JPL
393759	2005 FN_{7}	—	March 30, 2005	Catalina	CSS	·	2.0 km	MPC · JPL
393760	2005 GE_{18}	—	March 17, 2005	Mount Lemmon	Mount Lemmon Survey	·	1.6 km	MPC · JPL
393761	2005 GO_{66}	—	April 2, 2005	Mount Lemmon	Mount Lemmon Survey	·	1.4 km	MPC · JPL
393762	2005 GB_{70}	—	April 4, 2005	Kitt Peak	Spacewatch	·	1.4 km	MPC · JPL
393763	2005 GA_{76}	—	April 5, 2005	Mount Lemmon	Mount Lemmon Survey	AGN	1.0 km	MPC · JPL
393764	2005 GS_{87}	—	April 4, 2005	Mount Lemmon	Mount Lemmon Survey	MRX	930 m	MPC · JPL
393765	2005 GG_{98}	—	April 7, 2005	Palomar	NEAT	EUN	1.6 km	MPC · JPL
393766	2005 GS_{113}	—	April 9, 2005	Socorro	LINEAR	·	1.8 km	MPC · JPL
393767	2005 GE_{116}	—	April 11, 2005	Kitt Peak	Spacewatch	·	1.7 km	MPC · JPL
393768	2005 GX_{134}	—	April 10, 2005	Mount Lemmon	Mount Lemmon Survey	·	2.2 km	MPC · JPL
393769	2005 GJ_{136}	—	April 2, 2005	Kitt Peak	Spacewatch	·	2.0 km	MPC · JPL
393770	2005 GE_{138}	—	April 11, 2005	Kitt Peak	Spacewatch	MIS	1.9 km	MPC · JPL
393771	2005 GJ_{144}	—	April 2, 2005	Kitt Peak	Spacewatch	·	2.5 km	MPC · JPL
393772	2005 GV_{146}	—	April 11, 2005	Kitt Peak	Spacewatch	·	1.6 km	MPC · JPL
393773	2005 GN_{170}	—	April 12, 2005	Socorro	LINEAR	·	1.8 km	MPC · JPL
393774	2005 GV_{201}	—	March 14, 2005	Mount Lemmon	Mount Lemmon Survey	·	1.8 km	MPC · JPL
393775	2005 GT_{214}	—	April 7, 2005	Kitt Peak	Spacewatch	·	2.3 km	MPC · JPL
393776	2005 GV_{216}	—	March 16, 2005	Mount Lemmon	Mount Lemmon Survey	KOR	1.7 km	MPC · JPL
393777	2005 GD_{222}	—	April 9, 2005	Kitt Peak	Spacewatch	·	1.5 km	MPC · JPL
393778	2005 JB_{20}	—	May 4, 2005	Catalina	CSS	JUN	1.4 km	MPC · JPL
393779	2005 JF_{28}	—	May 3, 2005	Kitt Peak	Spacewatch	GEF	1.0 km	MPC · JPL
393780	2005 JG_{28}	—	May 3, 2005	Kitt Peak	Spacewatch	·	2.7 km	MPC · JPL
393781	2005 JR_{48}	—	May 3, 2005	Kitt Peak	Spacewatch	·	1.9 km	MPC · JPL
393782	2005 JB_{51}	—	May 4, 2005	Kitt Peak	Spacewatch	·	1.8 km	MPC · JPL
393783	2005 JL_{61}	—	May 8, 2005	Mount Lemmon	Mount Lemmon Survey	·	1.8 km	MPC · JPL
393784	2005 JR_{132}	—	May 14, 2005	Kitt Peak	Spacewatch	·	2.4 km	MPC · JPL
393785	2005 JP_{141}	—	May 14, 2005	Mount Lemmon	Mount Lemmon Survey	·	2.0 km	MPC · JPL
393786	2005 JL_{149}	—	May 3, 2005	Kitt Peak	Spacewatch	·	2.6 km	MPC · JPL
393787	2005 JU_{156}	—	May 4, 2005	Kitt Peak	Spacewatch	·	2.1 km	MPC · JPL
393788	2005 JG_{185}	—	May 15, 2005	Mount Lemmon	Mount Lemmon Survey	GEF	1.3 km	MPC · JPL
393789	2005 KN_{4}	—	May 8, 2005	Kitt Peak	Spacewatch	HOF	3.0 km	MPC · JPL
393790	2005 LD_{37}	—	June 8, 2005	Kitt Peak	Spacewatch	·	2.2 km	MPC · JPL
393791	2005 LJ_{53}	—	June 13, 2005	Kitt Peak	Spacewatch	EOS	1.8 km	MPC · JPL
393792	2005 MR_{3}	—	June 16, 2005	Kitt Peak	Spacewatch	MRX	1.1 km	MPC · JPL
393793	2005 MU_{25}	—	June 27, 2005	Kitt Peak	Spacewatch	·	2.4 km	MPC · JPL
393794	2005 NV_{9}	—	July 1, 2005	Kitt Peak	Spacewatch	·	2.3 km	MPC · JPL
393795	2005 NO_{10}	—	July 3, 2005	Mount Lemmon	Mount Lemmon Survey	·	1.6 km	MPC · JPL
393796	2005 NV_{13}	—	July 5, 2005	Kitt Peak	Spacewatch	·	1.4 km	MPC · JPL
393797	2005 NB_{14}	—	July 5, 2005	Kitt Peak	Spacewatch	·	1.7 km	MPC · JPL
393798	2005 NB_{22}	—	June 18, 2005	Mount Lemmon	Mount Lemmon Survey	·	660 m	MPC · JPL
393799	2005 PW_{28}	—	August 10, 2005	Cerro Tololo	M. W. Buie	EOS	1.9 km	MPC · JPL
393800	2005 QC_{20}	—	August 26, 2005	Anderson Mesa	LONEOS	·	750 m	MPC · JPL

== 393801–393900 ==
back to top

Designation			Discovery			Properties		Ref
Permanent	Provisional	Named after	Date	Site	Discoverer(s)	Category	Diam.	Ref
393801	2005 QX_{25}	—	August 27, 2005	Kitt Peak	Spacewatch	·	2.4 km	MPC · JPL
393802	2005 QK_{38}	—	August 25, 2005	Palomar	NEAT	·	760 m	MPC · JPL
393803	2005 QM_{56}	—	August 28, 2005	Kitt Peak	Spacewatch	·	750 m	MPC · JPL
393804	2005 QH_{71}	—	August 3, 2005	Socorro	LINEAR	·	830 m	MPC · JPL
393805	2005 QO_{77}	—	August 25, 2005	Palomar	NEAT	THM	2.6 km	MPC · JPL
393806	2005 QE_{100}	—	August 27, 2005	Palomar	NEAT	·	720 m	MPC · JPL
393807	2005 QF_{100}	—	August 27, 2005	Palomar	NEAT	·	640 m	MPC · JPL
393808	2005 QT_{104}	—	August 27, 2005	Palomar	NEAT	·	3.6 km	MPC · JPL
393809	2005 QY_{120}	—	August 28, 2005	Kitt Peak	Spacewatch	·	2.8 km	MPC · JPL
393810	2005 QX_{141}	—	August 30, 2005	Kitt Peak	Spacewatch	EOS	1.7 km	MPC · JPL
393811	2005 QH_{147}	—	August 28, 2005	Siding Spring	SSS	·	2.1 km	MPC · JPL
393812	2005 QV_{174}	—	August 31, 2005	Kitt Peak	Spacewatch	·	3.2 km	MPC · JPL
393813	2005 QN_{181}	—	August 30, 2005	Kitt Peak	Spacewatch	·	2.5 km	MPC · JPL
393814	2005 RS_{15}	—	September 1, 2005	Kitt Peak	Spacewatch	·	810 m	MPC · JPL
393815	2005 SO_{3}	—	September 23, 2005	Kitt Peak	Spacewatch	·	690 m	MPC · JPL
393816	2005 SS_{6}	—	September 23, 2005	Kitt Peak	Spacewatch	·	2.8 km	MPC · JPL
393817	2005 SN_{15}	—	September 26, 2005	Kitt Peak	Spacewatch	·	680 m	MPC · JPL
393818	2005 SF_{16}	—	September 26, 2005	Kitt Peak	Spacewatch	·	3.2 km	MPC · JPL
393819	2005 SZ_{18}	—	September 26, 2005	Kitt Peak	Spacewatch	·	670 m	MPC · JPL
393820	2005 SP_{27}	—	September 23, 2005	Kitt Peak	Spacewatch	EOS	2.1 km	MPC · JPL
393821	2005 SC_{29}	—	September 23, 2005	Kitt Peak	Spacewatch	·	850 m	MPC · JPL
393822	2005 SX_{35}	—	September 23, 2005	Catalina	CSS	·	590 m	MPC · JPL
393823	2005 SW_{37}	—	September 24, 2005	Kitt Peak	Spacewatch	·	3.0 km	MPC · JPL
393824	2005 SX_{62}	—	September 26, 2005	Kitt Peak	Spacewatch	·	3.1 km	MPC · JPL
393825	2005 SV_{64}	—	September 1, 2005	Kitt Peak	Spacewatch	·	2.8 km	MPC · JPL
393826	2005 SU_{67}	—	September 27, 2005	Kitt Peak	Spacewatch	·	650 m	MPC · JPL
393827	2005 SW_{81}	—	August 31, 2005	Kitt Peak	Spacewatch	VER	2.4 km	MPC · JPL
393828	2005 SR_{82}	—	September 24, 2005	Kitt Peak	Spacewatch	·	2.7 km	MPC · JPL
393829	2005 SE_{84}	—	September 24, 2005	Kitt Peak	Spacewatch	·	2.1 km	MPC · JPL
393830	2005 SL_{86}	—	September 24, 2005	Kitt Peak	Spacewatch	VER	2.6 km	MPC · JPL
393831	2005 ST_{87}	—	September 24, 2005	Kitt Peak	Spacewatch	·	2.3 km	MPC · JPL
393832	2005 SR_{89}	—	September 24, 2005	Kitt Peak	Spacewatch	·	3.5 km	MPC · JPL
393833	2005 SE_{91}	—	September 24, 2005	Kitt Peak	Spacewatch	·	2.9 km	MPC · JPL
393834	2005 SJ_{92}	—	September 24, 2005	Kitt Peak	Spacewatch	·	2.0 km	MPC · JPL
393835	2005 SF_{100}	—	September 25, 2005	Kitt Peak	Spacewatch	·	800 m	MPC · JPL
393836	2005 SW_{108}	—	September 26, 2005	Kitt Peak	Spacewatch	EOS	2.0 km	MPC · JPL
393837	2005 SK_{109}	—	September 26, 2005	Kitt Peak	Spacewatch	·	730 m	MPC · JPL
393838	2005 SF_{115}	—	April 4, 2003	Kitt Peak	Spacewatch	·	3.3 km	MPC · JPL
393839	2005 SP_{115}	—	September 27, 2005	Kitt Peak	Spacewatch	·	850 m	MPC · JPL
393840	2005 SB_{120}	—	September 29, 2005	Kitt Peak	Spacewatch	PHO	2.3 km	MPC · JPL
393841	2005 SA_{121}	—	September 29, 2005	Kitt Peak	Spacewatch	·	740 m	MPC · JPL
393842	2005 SG_{128}	—	September 29, 2005	Anderson Mesa	LONEOS	·	720 m	MPC · JPL
393843	2005 SO_{132}	—	September 29, 2005	Kitt Peak	Spacewatch	·	3.0 km	MPC · JPL
393844	2005 SD_{142}	—	September 25, 2005	Kitt Peak	Spacewatch	·	2.9 km	MPC · JPL
393845	2005 SD_{147}	—	September 25, 2005	Kitt Peak	Spacewatch	·	3.2 km	MPC · JPL
393846	2005 SD_{149}	—	September 25, 2005	Kitt Peak	Spacewatch	EMA	4.0 km	MPC · JPL
393847	2005 SX_{149}	—	September 25, 2005	Kitt Peak	Spacewatch	·	2.0 km	MPC · JPL
393848	2005 SK_{154}	—	September 26, 2005	Kitt Peak	Spacewatch	·	690 m	MPC · JPL
393849	2005 SD_{155}	—	September 26, 2005	Kitt Peak	Spacewatch	·	2.9 km	MPC · JPL
393850	2005 SM_{162}	—	September 27, 2005	Kitt Peak	Spacewatch	·	2.2 km	MPC · JPL
393851	2005 SG_{169}	—	September 29, 2005	Kitt Peak	Spacewatch	·	2.2 km	MPC · JPL
393852	2005 SP_{170}	—	September 29, 2005	Kitt Peak	Spacewatch	·	2.9 km	MPC · JPL
393853	2005 SN_{181}	—	September 29, 2005	Kitt Peak	Spacewatch	·	3.3 km	MPC · JPL
393854	2005 SE_{182}	—	September 29, 2005	Kitt Peak	Spacewatch	·	720 m	MPC · JPL
393855	2005 SJ_{192}	—	September 29, 2005	Mount Lemmon	Mount Lemmon Survey	·	2.7 km	MPC · JPL
393856	2005 SO_{199}	—	August 31, 2005	Kitt Peak	Spacewatch	·	2.8 km	MPC · JPL
393857	2005 SL_{209}	—	September 1, 2005	Campo Imperatore	CINEOS	EOS	2.4 km	MPC · JPL
393858	2005 ST_{220}	—	September 29, 2005	Catalina	CSS	·	990 m	MPC · JPL
393859	2005 SN_{225}	—	September 29, 2005	Catalina	CSS	·	1.9 km	MPC · JPL
393860	2005 SA_{226}	—	September 30, 2005	Kitt Peak	Spacewatch	·	3.0 km	MPC · JPL
393861	2005 SL_{233}	—	September 30, 2005	Mount Lemmon	Mount Lemmon Survey	·	4.4 km	MPC · JPL
393862	2005 SO_{233}	—	September 30, 2005	Mount Lemmon	Mount Lemmon Survey	·	1.8 km	MPC · JPL
393863	2005 SE_{239}	—	September 30, 2005	Kitt Peak	Spacewatch	EOS	2.1 km	MPC · JPL
393864	2005 SE_{264}	—	August 30, 2005	Kitt Peak	Spacewatch	·	2.4 km	MPC · JPL
393865	2005 SY_{270}	—	September 30, 2005	Anderson Mesa	LONEOS	·	750 m	MPC · JPL
393866	2005 SX_{274}	—	September 29, 2005	Mount Lemmon	Mount Lemmon Survey	·	1.9 km	MPC · JPL
393867	2005 SG_{279}	—	September 30, 2005	Kitt Peak	Spacewatch	EOS	1.9 km	MPC · JPL
393868	2005 SY_{279}	—	September 23, 2005	Kitt Peak	Spacewatch	·	3.2 km	MPC · JPL
393869	2005 SS_{291}	—	September 26, 2005	Kitt Peak	Spacewatch	EOS	3.5 km	MPC · JPL
393870	2005 TG_{4}	—	October 1, 2005	Mount Lemmon	Mount Lemmon Survey	·	2.6 km	MPC · JPL
393871	2005 TD_{12}	—	October 1, 2005	Kitt Peak	Spacewatch	EOS	2.1 km	MPC · JPL
393872	2005 TS_{18}	—	August 27, 2005	Anderson Mesa	LONEOS	·	2.6 km	MPC · JPL
393873	2005 TE_{24}	—	October 1, 2005	Mount Lemmon	Mount Lemmon Survey	·	2.7 km	MPC · JPL
393874	2005 TF_{26}	—	October 1, 2005	Mount Lemmon	Mount Lemmon Survey	·	3.0 km	MPC · JPL
393875	2005 TD_{28}	—	September 23, 2005	Kitt Peak	Spacewatch	·	3.3 km	MPC · JPL
393876	2005 TW_{33}	—	October 1, 2005	Kitt Peak	Spacewatch	EOS	2.1 km	MPC · JPL
393877	2005 TK_{38}	—	October 1, 2005	Mount Lemmon	Mount Lemmon Survey	·	2.3 km	MPC · JPL
393878	2005 TC_{47}	—	October 3, 2005	Bergisch Gladbach	W. Bickel	·	810 m	MPC · JPL
393879	2005 TA_{48}	—	October 6, 2005	Kitt Peak	Spacewatch	·	2.7 km	MPC · JPL
393880	2005 TO_{55}	—	September 23, 2005	Catalina	CSS	·	770 m	MPC · JPL
393881	2005 TM_{57}	—	October 1, 2005	Mount Lemmon	Mount Lemmon Survey	·	3.2 km	MPC · JPL
393882	2005 TO_{60}	—	November 17, 1998	Kitt Peak	Spacewatch	·	1.2 km	MPC · JPL
393883	2005 TA_{75}	—	October 1, 2005	Kitt Peak	Spacewatch	·	3.3 km	MPC · JPL
393884	2005 TM_{75}	—	October 3, 2005	Catalina	CSS	·	1.9 km	MPC · JPL
393885	2005 TU_{76}	—	September 24, 2005	Anderson Mesa	LONEOS	·	1.0 km	MPC · JPL
393886	2005 TO_{78}	—	October 7, 2005	Catalina	CSS	·	740 m	MPC · JPL
393887	2005 TN_{83}	—	October 3, 2005	Catalina	CSS	·	840 m	MPC · JPL
393888	2005 TJ_{100}	—	September 25, 2005	Kitt Peak	Spacewatch	VER	2.6 km	MPC · JPL
393889	2005 TX_{101}	—	October 7, 2005	Mount Lemmon	Mount Lemmon Survey	·	2.5 km	MPC · JPL
393890	2005 TF_{102}	—	October 7, 2005	Mount Lemmon	Mount Lemmon Survey	·	2.6 km	MPC · JPL
393891	2005 TV_{104}	—	October 8, 2005	Catalina	CSS	·	3.2 km	MPC · JPL
393892	2005 TH_{105}	—	October 8, 2005	Catalina	CSS	·	3.7 km	MPC · JPL
393893	2005 TQ_{119}	—	September 26, 2005	Kitt Peak	Spacewatch	EOS	1.7 km	MPC · JPL
393894	2005 TR_{121}	—	October 7, 2005	Kitt Peak	Spacewatch	·	520 m	MPC · JPL
393895	2005 TZ_{121}	—	September 23, 2005	Kitt Peak	Spacewatch	·	1.9 km	MPC · JPL
393896	2005 TY_{140}	—	September 29, 2005	Kitt Peak	Spacewatch	·	3.0 km	MPC · JPL
393897	2005 TU_{141}	—	October 8, 2005	Kitt Peak	Spacewatch	EOS	1.8 km	MPC · JPL
393898	2005 TN_{142}	—	October 8, 2005	Kitt Peak	Spacewatch	VER	2.5 km	MPC · JPL
393899	2005 TV_{150}	—	October 8, 2005	Kitt Peak	Spacewatch	·	2.5 km	MPC · JPL
393900	2005 TH_{155}	—	October 9, 2005	Kitt Peak	Spacewatch	·	690 m	MPC · JPL

== 393901–394000 ==
back to top

Designation			Discovery			Properties		Ref
Permanent	Provisional	Named after	Date	Site	Discoverer(s)	Category	Diam.	Ref
393901	2005 TN_{161}	—	October 9, 2005	Kitt Peak	Spacewatch	·	2.2 km	MPC · JPL
393902	2005 TH_{174}	—	September 26, 2005	Kitt Peak	Spacewatch	·	2.9 km	MPC · JPL
393903	2005 TH_{193}	—	October 1, 2005	Mount Lemmon	Mount Lemmon Survey	·	570 m	MPC · JPL
393904	2005 TZ_{193}	—	October 1, 2005	Kitt Peak	Spacewatch	·	2.1 km	MPC · JPL
393905	2005 TF_{194}	—	October 7, 2005	Mount Lemmon	Mount Lemmon Survey	·	740 m	MPC · JPL
393906	2005 UZ_{1}	—	October 22, 2005	Goodricke-Pigott	R. A. Tucker	·	860 m	MPC · JPL
393907	2005 UR_{2}	—	October 24, 2005	Kitt Peak	Spacewatch	·	650 m	MPC · JPL
393908	2005 UH_{3}	—	October 25, 2005	Kitt Peak	Spacewatch	APO +1km	1.2 km	MPC · JPL
393909	2005 UQ_{10}	—	October 21, 2005	Palomar	NEAT	·	960 m	MPC · JPL
393910	2005 UK_{23}	—	October 23, 2005	Kitt Peak	Spacewatch	·	680 m	MPC · JPL
393911	2005 UB_{25}	—	October 23, 2005	Kitt Peak	Spacewatch	EOS	2.0 km	MPC · JPL
393912	2005 UL_{26}	—	October 23, 2005	Junk Bond	D. Healy	·	2.4 km	MPC · JPL
393913	2005 UT_{30}	—	October 24, 2005	Kitt Peak	Spacewatch	·	3.0 km	MPC · JPL
393914	2005 US_{35}	—	October 24, 2005	Kitt Peak	Spacewatch	·	3.5 km	MPC · JPL
393915	2005 UK_{42}	—	October 22, 2005	Kitt Peak	Spacewatch	VER	3.0 km	MPC · JPL
393916	2005 UN_{45}	—	October 1, 2005	Catalina	CSS	·	2.6 km	MPC · JPL
393917	2005 UF_{47}	—	October 22, 2005	Kitt Peak	Spacewatch	·	2.5 km	MPC · JPL
393918	2005 UR_{60}	—	October 25, 2005	Mount Lemmon	Mount Lemmon Survey	·	3.7 km	MPC · JPL
393919	2005 US_{60}	—	October 25, 2005	Mount Lemmon	Mount Lemmon Survey	·	880 m	MPC · JPL
393920	2005 UV_{66}	—	October 22, 2005	Palomar	NEAT	·	810 m	MPC · JPL
393921	2005 US_{71}	—	October 23, 2005	Catalina	CSS	·	3.5 km	MPC · JPL
393922	2005 UE_{73}	—	October 23, 2005	Palomar	NEAT	·	750 m	MPC · JPL
393923	2005 UQ_{78}	—	October 25, 2005	Catalina	CSS	·	860 m	MPC · JPL
393924	2005 UU_{78}	—	October 25, 2005	Catalina	CSS	·	1.0 km	MPC · JPL
393925	2005 UX_{94}	—	October 22, 2005	Kitt Peak	Spacewatch	·	570 m	MPC · JPL
393926	2005 UF_{97}	—	October 22, 2005	Kitt Peak	Spacewatch	·	2.6 km	MPC · JPL
393927	2005 UA_{99}	—	October 22, 2005	Kitt Peak	Spacewatch	·	3.9 km	MPC · JPL
393928	2005 UT_{105}	—	October 22, 2005	Kitt Peak	Spacewatch	·	3.4 km	MPC · JPL
393929	2005 UF_{107}	—	October 22, 2005	Kitt Peak	Spacewatch	·	3.1 km	MPC · JPL
393930	2005 UL_{108}	—	October 22, 2005	Kitt Peak	Spacewatch	·	3.0 km	MPC · JPL
393931	2005 UQ_{110}	—	October 22, 2005	Kitt Peak	Spacewatch	·	4.9 km	MPC · JPL
393932	2005 UM_{119}	—	October 24, 2005	Kitt Peak	Spacewatch	·	2.7 km	MPC · JPL
393933	2005 UW_{123}	—	October 24, 2005	Kitt Peak	Spacewatch	·	2.8 km	MPC · JPL
393934	2005 UN_{124}	—	October 24, 2005	Kitt Peak	Spacewatch	·	2.4 km	MPC · JPL
393935	2005 UJ_{128}	—	October 24, 2005	Kitt Peak	Spacewatch	·	2.8 km	MPC · JPL
393936	2005 UG_{136}	—	October 25, 2005	Mount Lemmon	Mount Lemmon Survey	·	2.5 km	MPC · JPL
393937	2005 UX_{148}	—	October 26, 2005	Kitt Peak	Spacewatch	·	1.1 km	MPC · JPL
393938	2005 UK_{154}	—	October 26, 2005	Kitt Peak	Spacewatch	VER	3.1 km	MPC · JPL
393939	2005 UV_{161}	—	October 25, 2005	Kitt Peak	Spacewatch	·	4.0 km	MPC · JPL
393940	2005 UL_{163}	—	October 10, 2005	Kitt Peak	Spacewatch	·	3.4 km	MPC · JPL
393941	2005 UO_{167}	—	October 13, 2005	Kitt Peak	Spacewatch	URS	2.5 km	MPC · JPL
393942	2005 UE_{169}	—	October 24, 2005	Kitt Peak	Spacewatch	·	3.1 km	MPC · JPL
393943	2005 UQ_{171}	—	October 24, 2005	Kitt Peak	Spacewatch	·	820 m	MPC · JPL
393944	2005 UR_{172}	—	October 24, 2005	Kitt Peak	Spacewatch	·	630 m	MPC · JPL
393945	2005 UY_{186}	—	October 26, 2005	Anderson Mesa	LONEOS	·	4.3 km	MPC · JPL
393946	2005 UP_{192}	—	October 21, 2005	Palomar	NEAT	PHO	590 m	MPC · JPL
393947	2005 UC_{198}	—	October 25, 2005	Kitt Peak	Spacewatch	EOS	1.9 km	MPC · JPL
393948	2005 UW_{200}	—	October 25, 2005	Kitt Peak	Spacewatch	·	710 m	MPC · JPL
393949	2005 UA_{203}	—	October 25, 2005	Kitt Peak	Spacewatch	·	4.0 km	MPC · JPL
393950	2005 UB_{204}	—	October 25, 2005	Mount Lemmon	Mount Lemmon Survey	·	3.0 km	MPC · JPL
393951	2005 UA_{207}	—	October 27, 2005	Kitt Peak	Spacewatch	·	3.5 km	MPC · JPL
393952	2005 US_{212}	—	October 27, 2005	Kitt Peak	Spacewatch	·	800 m	MPC · JPL
393953	2005 UR_{213}	—	October 22, 2005	Palomar	NEAT	·	1.5 km	MPC · JPL
393954	2005 UX_{215}	—	October 22, 2005	Catalina	CSS	·	690 m	MPC · JPL
393955	2005 UJ_{221}	—	October 25, 2005	Kitt Peak	Spacewatch	·	880 m	MPC · JPL
393956	2005 UA_{223}	—	October 25, 2005	Kitt Peak	Spacewatch	·	3.6 km	MPC · JPL
393957	2005 UZ_{223}	—	October 25, 2005	Kitt Peak	Spacewatch	EMA	3.4 km	MPC · JPL
393958	2005 UK_{233}	—	October 25, 2005	Kitt Peak	Spacewatch	PHO	1.3 km	MPC · JPL
393959	2005 UC_{236}	—	October 25, 2005	Kitt Peak	Spacewatch	V	770 m	MPC · JPL
393960	2005 UY_{239}	—	October 25, 2005	Kitt Peak	Spacewatch	·	630 m	MPC · JPL
393961	2005 UK_{241}	—	October 25, 2005	Kitt Peak	Spacewatch	·	2.9 km	MPC · JPL
393962	2005 UE_{248}	—	October 28, 2005	Mount Lemmon	Mount Lemmon Survey	·	3.7 km	MPC · JPL
393963	2005 UO_{248}	—	October 28, 2005	Mount Lemmon	Mount Lemmon Survey	VER	3.3 km	MPC · JPL
393964	2005 UM_{265}	—	October 27, 2005	Kitt Peak	Spacewatch	·	3.2 km	MPC · JPL
393965	2005 UA_{270}	—	October 28, 2005	Socorro	LINEAR	EOS	3.5 km	MPC · JPL
393966	2005 UC_{278}	—	October 24, 2005	Kitt Peak	Spacewatch	EOS	2.5 km	MPC · JPL
393967	2005 US_{279}	—	October 24, 2005	Kitt Peak	Spacewatch	·	2.4 km	MPC · JPL
393968	2005 UP_{283}	—	October 26, 2005	Kitt Peak	Spacewatch	·	3.6 km	MPC · JPL
393969	2005 UQ_{284}	—	October 26, 2005	Kitt Peak	Spacewatch	·	3.6 km	MPC · JPL
393970	2005 UJ_{289}	—	October 26, 2005	Kitt Peak	Spacewatch	·	1.0 km	MPC · JPL
393971	2005 US_{291}	—	October 26, 2005	Kitt Peak	Spacewatch	·	770 m	MPC · JPL
393972	2005 UC_{308}	—	October 27, 2005	Mount Lemmon	Mount Lemmon Survey	·	3.4 km	MPC · JPL
393973	2005 UF_{312}	—	October 29, 2005	Mount Lemmon	Mount Lemmon Survey	EOS	1.5 km	MPC · JPL
393974	2005 UG_{312}	—	October 29, 2005	Mount Lemmon	Mount Lemmon Survey	·	2.8 km	MPC · JPL
393975	2005 UY_{323}	—	October 29, 2005	Mount Lemmon	Mount Lemmon Survey	·	2.9 km	MPC · JPL
393976	2005 UD_{324}	—	October 29, 2005	Kitt Peak	Spacewatch	·	800 m	MPC · JPL
393977	2005 UQ_{329}	—	October 28, 2005	Mount Lemmon	Mount Lemmon Survey	·	2.8 km	MPC · JPL
393978	2005 UH_{341}	—	October 31, 2005	Socorro	LINEAR	·	760 m	MPC · JPL
393979	2005 US_{341}	—	October 31, 2005	Kitt Peak	Spacewatch	·	2.7 km	MPC · JPL
393980	2005 UP_{352}	—	October 29, 2005	Catalina	CSS	V	790 m	MPC · JPL
393981	2005 UT_{352}	—	October 29, 2005	Catalina	CSS	·	3.3 km	MPC · JPL
393982	2005 UG_{361}	—	October 27, 2005	Kitt Peak	Spacewatch	EOS	1.8 km	MPC · JPL
393983	2005 UD_{377}	—	October 27, 2005	Kitt Peak	Spacewatch	·	770 m	MPC · JPL
393984	2005 UW_{378}	—	October 29, 2005	Mount Lemmon	Mount Lemmon Survey	·	730 m	MPC · JPL
393985	2005 UY_{386}	—	October 30, 2005	Mount Lemmon	Mount Lemmon Survey	·	2.5 km	MPC · JPL
393986	2005 UJ_{388}	—	October 26, 2005	Kitt Peak	Spacewatch	·	880 m	MPC · JPL
393987	2005 UD_{404}	—	October 29, 2005	Kitt Peak	Spacewatch	VER	3.4 km	MPC · JPL
393988	2005 UB_{409}	—	October 31, 2005	Mount Lemmon	Mount Lemmon Survey	·	670 m	MPC · JPL
393989	2005 UR_{413}	—	October 25, 2005	Kitt Peak	Spacewatch	·	2.1 km	MPC · JPL
393990	2005 UF_{416}	—	October 25, 2005	Kitt Peak	Spacewatch	·	770 m	MPC · JPL
393991	2005 UR_{430}	—	October 28, 2005	Kitt Peak	Spacewatch	·	2.6 km	MPC · JPL
393992	2005 UW_{433}	—	October 28, 2005	Kitt Peak	Spacewatch	·	990 m	MPC · JPL
393993	2005 UA_{437}	—	October 31, 2005	Kitt Peak	Spacewatch	·	3.2 km	MPC · JPL
393994	2005 UV_{440}	—	October 29, 2005	Kitt Peak	Spacewatch	·	2.8 km	MPC · JPL
393995	2005 UG_{449}	—	October 30, 2005	Socorro	LINEAR	·	2.9 km	MPC · JPL
393996	2005 UC_{455}	—	October 28, 2005	Catalina	CSS	EUP	4.6 km	MPC · JPL
393997	2005 UH_{469}	—	October 30, 2005	Kitt Peak	Spacewatch	·	850 m	MPC · JPL
393998	2005 UN_{494}	—	October 25, 2005	Catalina	CSS	·	5.1 km	MPC · JPL
393999	2005 UY_{511}	—	October 28, 2005	Mount Lemmon	Mount Lemmon Survey	·	740 m	MPC · JPL
394000	2005 UG_{512}	—	October 29, 2005	Mount Lemmon	Mount Lemmon Survey	·	660 m	MPC · JPL

back to top

== See also ==
- Meanings of minor-planet names: 393001–394000
