= 152P/Helin–Lawrence =

Jupiter-family comet

Discovery
- Discovered by: Eleanor F. Helin; Kenneth J. Lawrence
- Discovery site: Palomar Observatory
- Discovery date: 17 May 1993

Designations
- MPC designation: P/1993 K2; P/2001 Y1
- Alternative designations: 1993 XI, 1993l

Orbital characteristics
- Epoch: 21 February 2025 (JD 2461000.5)
- Observation arc: 31.71 years (Note: Observation arc from the Minor Planet Center database covering dates from 21 April 1993 until 4 January 2025.)
- Earliest precovery date: 21 April 1993
- Number of observations: 1,324
- Aphelion: 5.862 AU
- Perihelion: 3.111 AU
- Semi-major axis: 4.486 AU
- Eccentricity: 0.30656
- Orbital period: 9.51 years
- Inclination: 9.879°
- Longitude of ascending node: 91.776°
- Argument of periapsis: 164.41°
- Mean anomaly: 146.10°
- Last perihelion: 13 January 2022
- Next perihelion: 9 July 2031
- T_{Jupiter}: 2.901
- Earth MOID: 2.099 AU
- Jupiter MOID: 0.338 AU

Physical characteristics
- Mean diameter: 4.6 km (2.9 mi)
- Mean density: 480±80 kg/m^{3}
- Comet total magnitude (M1): 12.7

152P/Helin–Lawrence is a Jupiter-family comet with a 9.51-year orbit around the Sun. It is the third comet co-discovered by Eleanor F. Helin and Kenneth J. Lawrence. (Note: Eleanor Helin and Kenneth Lawrence co-discovered C/1991 F2 and C/1992 Q2 prior to 152P.) (Note: 152P is also the 12th and final comet discovered by Eleanor Helin, excluding her rediscovery of 107P/Wilson–Harrington)

== Observational history ==
Both Helin and Lawrence discovered the diffuse trails of the comet from the photographic plates exposed from the Palomar Observatory on the night of 17 May 1993. At the time, it was a 17th-magnitude object within the constellation Scorpio. (Note: Reported initial position upon discovery was: α = 16^{h} 45.3^{m} , δ = –16° 06′) Shortly after the announcement of its discovery, Robert H. McNaught was able to observe it during the total lunar eclipse of 4 June 1995.

It was recovered from the Saji Observatory by T. Oribe and Shuichi Nakano on 24 December 2001, where Oribe reported that the comet had an 8 arcsecond-long tail. On 11 January 2002, the comet showed a diffuse coma about 8 arcseconds wide and a tail about 13 arcseconds in length.

== Physical characteristics ==
Polarimetric observations from the European Southern Observatory in 2012 revealed that both 74P/Smirnova–Chernykh and 152P/Helin–Lawrence still produce cometary activity even at large heliocentric distances, suggesting that both comets were relative newcomers to the inner Solar System and thus contain large reservoirs of volatile material in their respective interiors.

The nucleus of 152P/Helin–Lawrence is estimated to be around 4.6 km (2.9 mi) in diameter, based on observations conducted using the Hubble and Keck telescopes in 1998.

== Notes ==
Numbered comets
Previous; 151P/Helin	152P/Helin–Lawrence	Next; 153P/Ikeya–Zhang
