= Kenneth J. Lawrence =

American astronomer

Minor planets discovered: 32
see § List of discovered minor planets

Kenneth J. Lawrence (born 1964) is an American astronomer and a discoverer of minor planets.

Credited by the Minor Planet Center with the discovery of 32 numbered asteroids between 1989 and 1994, he has also co-discovered 152P/Helin-Lawrence, a periodic comet from the Jupiter family. He was also a participant in the Palomar Planet-Crossing Asteroid Survey.

The main-belt asteroid 4969 Lawrence, discovered by Eleanor Helin in 1986, is named in his honor. Naming citation was published on 14 July 1992 (M.P.C. 20522).

== List of discovered minor planets ==
List of minor planets discovered by Kenneth Lawrence

Name	Discovery Date	Listing
5621 Erb	23 September 1990	list
5653 Camarillo	21 November 1992	list^{[A]}
(5836) 1993 MF	22 June 1993	list^{[A]}
6456 Golombek	27 July 1992	list^{[A]}
6561 Gruppetta	10 October 1991	list
(6727) 1991 TF_{4}	10 October 1991	list
7091 Maryfields	1 May 1992	list^{[A]}
(7341) 1991 VK	1 November 1991	list^{[A]}
(9058) 1992 JB	1 May 1992	list^{[B]}
(9400) 1994 TW_{1}	9 October 1994	list^{[A]}
9969 Braille	27 May 1992	list^{[A]}
(11904) 1991 TR_{1}	13 October 1991	list
(14923) 1994 TU_{3}	7 October 1994	list
(16636) 1993 QP	23 August 1993	list^{[A]}
(22306) 1990 SF_{4}	23 September 1990	list
(23548) 1994 EF_{2}	11 March 1994	list
(26850) 1992 JL	1 May 1992	list^{[C]}
30831 Seignovert	14 October 1990	list^{[A]}

Name	Discovery Date	Listing
(32906) 1994 RH	2 September 1994	list^{[A]}
(37589) 1991 NN_{9}	9 July 1991	list^{[A]}
(37591) 1991 TD_{4}	10 October 1991	list
(39565) 1992 SL	24 September 1992	list^{[A]}
(48470) 1991 TC_{2}	10 October 1991	list
(73681) 1989 TL_{18}	2 October 1989	list^{[A]}
(90722) 1991 TE_{4}	10 October 1991	list
(136620) 1994 JC	4 May 1994	list^{[A]}
(152563) 1992 BF	30 January 1992	list^{[A]}
(162004) 1991 VE	3 November 1991	list^{[A]}
(207945) 1991 JW	8 May 1991	list^{[A]}
(301846) 1993 OV_{1}	16 July 1993	list^{[A]}
(385186) 1994 AW_{1}	11 January 1994	list^{[A]}
(393350) 1992 RN_{1}	1 September 1992	list^{[A]}
Co-discovery made with:^{A} E. F. Helin^{B} J. Alu^{C} P. Rose

== See also ==
- List of minor planet discoverers § K. J. Lawrence
