= List of minor planets: 826001–827000 =

The following is a partial list of minor planets, running from minor-planet number 826001 through 827000, inclusive. The primary data for this and other partial lists is based on JPL's "Small-Body Orbital Elements" and data available from the Minor Planet Center. Critical list information is also provided by the MPC, unless otherwise specified from Lowell Observatory. A detailed description of the table's columns and additional sources are given on the main page including a complete list of every page in this series, and a statistical break-up on the dynamical classification of minor planets.

Also see the summary list of all named bodies in numerical and alphabetical order, and the corresponding naming citations for the number range of this particular list. New namings may only be added to this list after official publication, as the preannouncement of names is condemned by the Working Group for Small Bodies Nomenclature of the International Astronomical Union.

Near-Earth obj.	MBA (inner)	MBA (outer)	Centaur
Mars-crosser	MBA (middle)	Jupiter trojan	Trans-Neptunian obj.
Unclassified

== 826001–826100 ==
Designation			Discovery			Properties		Ref
Permanent	Provisional	Named after	Date	Site	Discoverer(s)	Category	Diam.	Ref
826001	2019 GX_{87}	—	April 2, 2019	Haleakala	Pan-STARRS 1	LUT	3.1 km	MPC · JPL
826002	2019 GQ_{88}	—	May 20, 2015	Cerro Tololo	DECam	·	920 m	MPC · JPL
826003	2019 GM_{101}	—	April 6, 2019	Haleakala	Pan-STARRS 1	KOR	1.0 km	MPC · JPL
826004	2019 GZ_{102}	—	April 3, 2019	Haleakala	Pan-STARRS 1	·	2.1 km	MPC · JPL
826005	2019 GY_{104}	—	April 9, 2019	Haleakala	Pan-STARRS 1	·	2.2 km	MPC · JPL
826006	2019 GT_{107}	—	April 2, 2019	Haleakala	Pan-STARRS 1	·	450 m	MPC · JPL
826007	2019 GC_{108}	—	September 9, 2015	Haleakala	Pan-STARRS 1	THM	1.6 km	MPC · JPL
826008	2019 GN_{117}	—	April 2, 2019	Haleakala	Pan-STARRS 1	·	2.3 km	MPC · JPL
826009	2019 GY_{119}	—	April 4, 2019	Haleakala	Pan-STARRS 1	EOS	1.5 km	MPC · JPL
826010	2019 GT_{120}	—	April 2, 2019	Haleakala	Pan-STARRS 1	·	2.3 km	MPC · JPL
826011	2019 GN_{121}	—	April 13, 2010	WISE	WISE	EUN	780 m	MPC · JPL
826012	2019 GL_{123}	—	April 2, 2019	Haleakala	Pan-STARRS 1	·	2.4 km	MPC · JPL
826013	2019 GY_{125}	—	April 8, 2019	Haleakala	Pan-STARRS 1	·	2.1 km	MPC · JPL
826014	2019 GQ_{126}	—	April 5, 2019	Haleakala	Pan-STARRS 1	·	1.3 km	MPC · JPL
826015	2019 GN_{128}	—	April 2, 2019	Haleakala	Pan-STARRS 1	TRE	1.9 km	MPC · JPL
826016	2019 GF_{129}	—	April 23, 2014	Haleakala	Pan-STARRS 1	·	1.8 km	MPC · JPL
826017	2019 GB_{130}	—	April 2, 2019	Haleakala	Pan-STARRS 1	·	2.5 km	MPC · JPL
826018	2019 GH_{132}	—	April 5, 2019	Haleakala	Pan-STARRS 1	·	2.0 km	MPC · JPL
826019	2019 GU_{136}	—	April 8, 2019	Haleakala	Pan-STARRS 1	·	2.2 km	MPC · JPL
826020	2019 GA_{137}	—	October 30, 2014	Mount Lemmon	Mount Lemmon Survey	·	410 m	MPC · JPL
826021	2019 GD_{141}	—	November 18, 2011	Mount Lemmon	Mount Lemmon Survey	·	2.2 km	MPC · JPL
826022	2019 GE_{152}	—	April 3, 2019	Haleakala	Pan-STARRS 1	·	1.6 km	MPC · JPL
826023	2019 GJ_{152}	—	April 8, 2019	Haleakala	Pan-STARRS 1	·	2.1 km	MPC · JPL
826024	2019 GQ_{153}	—	April 8, 2019	Haleakala	Pan-STARRS 1	T_{j} (2.98) · EUP	2.2 km	MPC · JPL
826025	2019 GE_{173}	—	April 4, 2019	Haleakala	Pan-STARRS 1	HYG	1.9 km	MPC · JPL
826026	2019 GJ_{175}	—	June 26, 2015	Haleakala	Pan-STARRS 1	EOS	1.2 km	MPC · JPL
826027	2019 GB_{183}	—	April 3, 2019	Haleakala	Pan-STARRS 1	VER	1.8 km	MPC · JPL
826028	2019 GX_{198}	—	April 3, 2019	Haleakala	Pan-STARRS 1	·	2.1 km	MPC · JPL
826029	2019 HK_{2}	—	March 29, 2019	Mount Lemmon	Mount Lemmon Survey	·	1.7 km	MPC · JPL
826030	2019 HG_{9}	—	April 24, 2019	Haleakala	Pan-STARRS 1	·	1.7 km	MPC · JPL
826031	2019 HH_{9}	—	April 24, 2019	Haleakala	Pan-STARRS 1	L5	6.6 km	MPC · JPL
826032	2019 HO_{12}	—	February 16, 2010	Mount Lemmon	Mount Lemmon Survey	·	1.0 km	MPC · JPL
826033	2019 HT_{12}	—	April 24, 2019	Haleakala	Pan-STARRS 1	·	1.7 km	MPC · JPL
826034	2019 HU_{12}	—	April 26, 2019	Mount Lemmon	Mount Lemmon Survey	EUP	2.4 km	MPC · JPL
826035	2019 HV_{12}	—	April 25, 2019	Haleakala	Pan-STARRS 1	T_{j} (2.91)	3.0 km	MPC · JPL
826036	2019 HP_{14}	—	April 24, 2019	Haleakala	Pan-STARRS 1	·	2.0 km	MPC · JPL
826037	2019 JZ_{3}	—	October 27, 2006	Catalina	CSS	·	710 m	MPC · JPL
826038	2019 JK_{9}	—	February 16, 2015	Haleakala	Pan-STARRS 1	NYS	810 m	MPC · JPL
826039	2019 JJ_{10}	—	April 4, 2019	Haleakala	Pan-STARRS 1	·	1.2 km	MPC · JPL
826040	2019 JZ_{11}	—	September 17, 2010	Mount Lemmon	Mount Lemmon Survey	·	1.7 km	MPC · JPL
826041	2019 JV_{16}	—	November 2, 2015	Bergisch Gladbach	W. Bickel	·	1.7 km	MPC · JPL
826042	2019 JC_{18}	—	November 13, 2015	Mount Lemmon	Mount Lemmon Survey	LUT	3.3 km	MPC · JPL
826043	2019 JW_{21}	—	October 23, 2015	Mount Lemmon	Mount Lemmon Survey	·	1.8 km	MPC · JPL
826044	2019 JH_{30}	—	September 10, 2015	Haleakala	Pan-STARRS 1	·	1.2 km	MPC · JPL
826045	2019 JY_{31}	—	April 26, 2019	Mount Lemmon	Mount Lemmon Survey	·	710 m	MPC · JPL
826046	2019 JB_{39}	—	February 17, 2010	Catalina	CSS	·	1.5 km	MPC · JPL
826047	2019 JM_{41}	—	November 23, 2012	Kitt Peak	Spacewatch	·	1.7 km	MPC · JPL
826048	2019 JG_{42}	—	January 9, 2013	Kitt Peak	Spacewatch	·	1.6 km	MPC · JPL
826049	2019 JM_{51}	—	May 12, 2019	Haleakala	Pan-STARRS 1	·	2.5 km	MPC · JPL
826050	2019 JZ_{52}	—	March 20, 2014	Mount Lemmon	Mount Lemmon Survey	·	1.8 km	MPC · JPL
826051	2019 JY_{54}	—	May 22, 2015	Haleakala	Pan-STARRS 1	·	1.3 km	MPC · JPL
826052	2019 JX_{59}	—	May 2, 2019	Haleakala	Pan-STARRS 1	·	980 m	MPC · JPL
826053	2019 JA_{60}	—	May 1, 2019	Mount Lemmon	Mount Lemmon Survey	T_{j} (2.96)	2.2 km	MPC · JPL
826054	2019 JH_{60}	—	September 12, 2015	Haleakala	Pan-STARRS 1	·	1.7 km	MPC · JPL
826055	2019 JQ_{61}	—	June 27, 2014	Haleakala	Pan-STARRS 1	·	1.7 km	MPC · JPL
826056	2019 JJ_{62}	—	May 4, 2019	Haleakala	Pan-STARRS 1	·	550 m	MPC · JPL
826057	2019 JF_{65}	—	May 1, 2019	Haleakala	Pan-STARRS 1	·	2.1 km	MPC · JPL
826058	2019 JT_{65}	—	May 2, 2019	Haleakala	Pan-STARRS 1	·	1.2 km	MPC · JPL
826059	2019 JX_{66}	—	May 7, 2019	Haleakala	Pan-STARRS 1	·	2.0 km	MPC · JPL
826060	2019 JF_{68}	—	May 14, 2019	Mount Lemmon	Mount Lemmon Survey	TIR	1.8 km	MPC · JPL
826061	2019 JW_{68}	—	May 2, 2019	Haleakala	Pan-STARRS 1	·	1.9 km	MPC · JPL
826062	2019 JC_{70}	—	May 11, 2019	Haleakala	Pan-STARRS 1	·	2.2 km	MPC · JPL
826063	2019 JR_{70}	—	October 3, 2015	Mount Lemmon	Mount Lemmon Survey	THM	1.6 km	MPC · JPL
826064	2019 JT_{71}	—	May 1, 2019	Haleakala	Pan-STARRS 1	·	1.5 km	MPC · JPL
826065	2019 JL_{72}	—	May 2, 2019	Haleakala	Pan-STARRS 1	·	1.9 km	MPC · JPL
826066	2019 JK_{73}	—	May 1, 2019	Haleakala	Pan-STARRS 1	·	1.5 km	MPC · JPL
826067	2019 JU_{82}	—	June 19, 2015	Haleakala	Pan-STARRS 1	·	800 m	MPC · JPL
826068	2019 JB_{86}	—	May 8, 2019	Haleakala	Pan-STARRS 1	·	2.2 km	MPC · JPL
826069	2019 JN_{90}	—	May 9, 2019	Haleakala	Pan-STARRS 1	·	1.4 km	MPC · JPL
826070	2019 JH_{107}	—	May 8, 2019	Haleakala	Pan-STARRS 1	·	2.3 km	MPC · JPL
826071	2019 JU_{108}	—	May 20, 2015	Cerro Tololo	DECam	(5)	830 m	MPC · JPL
826072	2019 KZ	—	October 9, 2016	Haleakala	Pan-STARRS 1	·	1.1 km	MPC · JPL
826073	2019 KH_{8}	—	May 26, 2019	Haleakala	Pan-STARRS 1	·	2.0 km	MPC · JPL
826074	2019 KR_{11}	—	May 26, 2019	Haleakala	Pan-STARRS 1	·	1.2 km	MPC · JPL
826075	2019 KS_{12}	—	January 26, 2006	Kitt Peak	Spacewatch	(5)	1.0 km	MPC · JPL
826076	2019 KS_{13}	—	May 30, 2019	Haleakala	Pan-STARRS 1	·	950 m	MPC · JPL
826077	2019 KM_{14}	—	August 18, 2009	Kitt Peak	Spacewatch	V	430 m	MPC · JPL
826078	2019 KO_{17}	—	April 2, 2019	Haleakala	Pan-STARRS 1	·	1.7 km	MPC · JPL
826079	2019 KJ_{19}	—	November 25, 2005	Kitt Peak	Spacewatch	·	2.1 km	MPC · JPL
826080	2019 KS_{19}	—	May 30, 2019	Haleakala	Pan-STARRS 1	·	430 m	MPC · JPL
826081	2019 KC_{20}	—	May 27, 2019	Haleakala	Pan-STARRS 1	·	1.9 km	MPC · JPL
826082	2019 KP_{20}	—	May 28, 2019	Mount Lemmon	Mount Lemmon Survey	·	930 m	MPC · JPL
826083	2019 KB_{21}	—	May 27, 2019	Haleakala	Pan-STARRS 1	·	630 m	MPC · JPL
826084	2019 KD_{21}	—	May 26, 2019	Haleakala	Pan-STARRS 1	·	780 m	MPC · JPL
826085	2019 KV_{23}	—	October 23, 2015	Mount Lemmon	Mount Lemmon Survey	·	1.8 km	MPC · JPL
826086	2019 KD_{26}	—	May 26, 2019	Haleakala	Pan-STARRS 1	·	2.1 km	MPC · JPL
826087	2019 KQ_{27}	—	May 25, 2019	Haleakala	Pan-STARRS 1	·	1.9 km	MPC · JPL
826088	2019 KX_{27}	—	May 30, 2019	Haleakala	Pan-STARRS 1	EOS	1.3 km	MPC · JPL
826089	2019 KP_{47}	—	May 24, 2019	Haleakala	Pan-STARRS 2	·	1.9 km	MPC · JPL
826090	2019 KY_{49}	—	May 29, 2019	Haleakala	Pan-STARRS 1	·	2.1 km	MPC · JPL
826091	2019 KW_{73}	—	September 1, 2013	Haleakala	Pan-STARRS 1	·	520 m	MPC · JPL
826092	2019 LP_{13}	—	June 10, 2019	Haleakala	Pan-STARRS 1	·	1.9 km	MPC · JPL
826093	2019 LS_{14}	—	June 8, 2019	Palomar Mountain	Zwicky Transient Facility	·	2.7 km	MPC · JPL
826094	2019 LW_{14}	—	June 1, 2019	Haleakala	Pan-STARRS 2	MAS	570 m	MPC · JPL
826095	2019 LA_{15}	—	June 11, 2019	Haleakala	Pan-STARRS 1	PHO	800 m	MPC · JPL
826096	2019 LC_{15}	—	April 29, 2014	Haleakala	Pan-STARRS 1	·	1.0 km	MPC · JPL
826097	2019 LL_{15}	—	June 12, 2019	Haleakala	Pan-STARRS 2	·	1.9 km	MPC · JPL
826098	2019 LR_{15}	—	June 3, 2019	Haleakala	Pan-STARRS 1	HYG	2.0 km	MPC · JPL
826099	2019 LE_{16}	—	June 2, 2019	Haleakala	Pan-STARRS 1	·	1.3 km	MPC · JPL
826100	2019 LC_{17}	—	June 2, 2019	Haleakala	Pan-STARRS 1	ARM	2.6 km	MPC · JPL

== 826101–826200 ==
back to top

Designation			Discovery			Properties		Ref
Permanent	Provisional	Named after	Date	Site	Discoverer(s)	Category	Diam.	Ref
826101	2019 LC_{18}	—	June 2, 2019	Haleakala	Pan-STARRS 1	EOS	1.2 km	MPC · JPL
826102	2019 LG_{21}	—	June 9, 2019	Haleakala	Pan-STARRS 1	HNS	870 m	MPC · JPL
826103	2019 LW_{26}	—	September 25, 2015	Mount Lemmon	Mount Lemmon Survey	·	1.3 km	MPC · JPL
826104	2019 LL_{42}	—	June 7, 2019	Haleakala	Pan-STARRS 1	·	1.8 km	MPC · JPL
826105	2019 MM_{10}	—	June 7, 2019	Haleakala	Pan-STARRS 2	THB	2.3 km	MPC · JPL
826106	2019 MO_{11}	—	June 30, 2019	Haleakala	Pan-STARRS 1	·	520 m	MPC · JPL
826107	2019 MO_{12}	—	June 24, 2019	Palomar Mountain	Zwicky Transient Facility	THB	2.7 km	MPC · JPL
826108	2019 MZ_{25}	—	June 29, 2019	Haleakala	Pan-STARRS 1	·	960 m	MPC · JPL
826109	2019 MX_{28}	—	June 30, 2019	Haleakala	Pan-STARRS 1	·	1.0 km	MPC · JPL
826110	2019 NN_{12}	—	July 1, 2019	Haleakala	Pan-STARRS 1	·	1.1 km	MPC · JPL
826111	2019 NC_{24}	—	July 3, 2019	Haleakala	Pan-STARRS 1	·	1.4 km	MPC · JPL
826112	2019 ND_{30}	—	July 2, 2019	Haleakala	Pan-STARRS 1	·	1.2 km	MPC · JPL
826113	2019 NB_{31}	—	August 27, 2000	Cerro Tololo	Deep Ecliptic Survey	·	2.8 km	MPC · JPL
826114	2019 NS_{36}	—	July 1, 2019	Haleakala	Pan-STARRS 1	·	990 m	MPC · JPL
826115	2019 NB_{37}	—	July 1, 2019	Haleakala	Pan-STARRS 1	·	490 m	MPC · JPL
826116	2019 NE_{37}	—	July 1, 2019	Haleakala	Pan-STARRS 1	·	890 m	MPC · JPL
826117	2019 NQ_{37}	—	July 3, 2019	Haleakala	Pan-STARRS 1	·	840 m	MPC · JPL
826118	2019 NQ_{38}	—	July 4, 2019	Haleakala	Pan-STARRS 1	·	540 m	MPC · JPL
826119	2019 NR_{41}	—	May 29, 2015	Haleakala	Pan-STARRS 1	·	810 m	MPC · JPL
826120	2019 NJ_{64}	—	July 10, 2019	Haleakala	Pan-STARRS 1	·	880 m	MPC · JPL
826121	2019 NU_{73}	—	July 5, 2019	Mount Lemmon	Mount Lemmon Survey	·	2.6 km	MPC · JPL
826122	2019 NK_{80}	—	July 12, 2005	Mount Lemmon	Mount Lemmon Survey	·	610 m	MPC · JPL
826123	2019 OL_{17}	—	October 25, 2016	Haleakala	Pan-STARRS 1	·	550 m	MPC · JPL
826124	2019 OP_{18}	—	May 25, 2015	Mount Lemmon	Mount Lemmon Survey	·	1.1 km	MPC · JPL
826125	2019 OG_{19}	—	September 22, 2014	Mount Lemmon	Mount Lemmon Survey	·	3.1 km	MPC · JPL
826126	2019 OW_{19}	—	March 20, 1999	Sacramento Peak	SDSS	·	500 m	MPC · JPL
826127	2019 OL_{23}	—	October 23, 2015	Mount Lemmon	Mount Lemmon Survey	EOS	1.2 km	MPC · JPL
826128	2019 OR_{23}	—	July 28, 2019	Haleakala	Pan-STARRS 2	(2076)	530 m	MPC · JPL
826129	2019 OS_{23}	—	July 27, 2019	Haleakala	Pan-STARRS 2	·	690 m	MPC · JPL
826130	2019 OC_{25}	—	July 28, 2019	Haleakala	Pan-STARRS 2	·	970 m	MPC · JPL
826131	2019 OQ_{28}	—	July 26, 2019	Haleakala	Pan-STARRS 2	·	2.8 km	MPC · JPL
826132	2019 OA_{51}	—	July 29, 2019	Haleakala	Pan-STARRS 2	·	990 m	MPC · JPL
826133	2019 PB_{4}	—	August 19, 2001	Cerro Tololo	Deep Ecliptic Survey	·	1.0 km	MPC · JPL
826134	2019 PG_{5}	—	September 30, 2014	Mount Lemmon	Mount Lemmon Survey	EOS	1.4 km	MPC · JPL
826135	2019 PQ_{10}	—	January 29, 2011	Kitt Peak	Spacewatch	V	400 m	MPC · JPL
826136	2019 PM_{11}	—	September 19, 2011	Haleakala	Pan-STARRS 1	·	990 m	MPC · JPL
826137	2019 PU_{32}	—	August 8, 2019	Haleakala	Pan-STARRS 2	·	700 m	MPC · JPL
826138	2019 PX_{33}	—	August 8, 2019	Haleakala	Pan-STARRS 1	·	850 m	MPC · JPL
826139	2019 PG_{34}	—	August 8, 2019	Haleakala	Pan-STARRS 2	AEO	750 m	MPC · JPL
826140	2019 PM_{37}	—	February 21, 2014	Kitt Peak	Spacewatch	·	690 m	MPC · JPL
826141	2019 PM_{40}	—	August 5, 2019	Haleakala	Pan-STARRS 1	V	410 m	MPC · JPL
826142	2019 PW_{43}	—	August 5, 2019	Haleakala	Pan-STARRS 1	·	550 m	MPC · JPL
826143	2019 PC_{56}	—	August 5, 2019	Haleakala	Pan-STARRS 1	V	420 m	MPC · JPL
826144	2019 PD_{56}	—	August 7, 2019	Haleakala	Pan-STARRS 2	·	1.0 km	MPC · JPL
826145	2019 PQ_{56}	—	August 8, 2019	Haleakala	Pan-STARRS 1	·	890 m	MPC · JPL
826146	2019 PR_{56}	—	August 5, 2019	Haleakala	Pan-STARRS 1	·	1.0 km	MPC · JPL
826147	2019 PD_{65}	—	August 8, 2019	Haleakala	Pan-STARRS 1	·	1.0 km	MPC · JPL
826148	2019 PB_{69}	—	August 9, 2019	Haleakala	Pan-STARRS 1	L4	5.7 km	MPC · JPL
826149	2019 PX_{73}	—	February 21, 2018	Haleakala	Pan-STARRS 1	·	750 m	MPC · JPL
826150	2019 PN_{76}	—	August 4, 2019	Haleakala	Pan-STARRS 1	L4	7.3 km	MPC · JPL
826151	2019 QQ_{5}	—	July 8, 2019	Mount Lemmon	Mount Lemmon Survey	L4	8.2 km	MPC · JPL
826152	2019 QQ_{7}	—	December 16, 2017	Mount Lemmon	Mount Lemmon Survey	H	410 m	MPC · JPL
826153	2019 QQ_{11}	—	October 20, 2003	Kitt Peak	Spacewatch	·	490 m	MPC · JPL
826154	2019 QG_{12}	—	October 4, 2016	Mount Lemmon	Mount Lemmon Survey	·	470 m	MPC · JPL
826155	2019 QL_{14}	—	August 23, 2019	Haleakala	Pan-STARRS 1	·	2.6 km	MPC · JPL
826156	2019 QZ_{15}	—	August 27, 2019	Mount Lemmon	Mount Lemmon Survey	·	1.4 km	MPC · JPL
826157	2019 QU_{16}	—	August 27, 2019	Haleakala	Pan-STARRS 2	·	540 m	MPC · JPL
826158	2019 QL_{18}	—	August 31, 2019	Haleakala	Pan-STARRS 1	·	580 m	MPC · JPL
826159	2019 QD_{22}	—	September 22, 2008	Catalina	CSS	EUP	2.9 km	MPC · JPL
826160	2019 QN_{30}	—	August 26, 2019	Haleakala	Pan-STARRS 2	·	980 m	MPC · JPL
826161	2019 QT_{31}	—	May 26, 2015	Mount Lemmon	Mount Lemmon Survey	·	600 m	MPC · JPL
826162	2019 QK_{39}	—	August 25, 2019	Haleakala	Pan-STARRS 2	·	3.3 km	MPC · JPL
826163	2019 QE_{52}	—	August 28, 2019	ESA OGS	ESA OGS	·	690 m	MPC · JPL
826164	2019 QQ_{72}	—	May 21, 2014	Haleakala	Pan-STARRS 1	·	920 m	MPC · JPL
826165	2019 QX_{79}	—	January 8, 2006	Mount Lemmon	Mount Lemmon Survey	PHO	740 m	MPC · JPL
826166	2019 QF_{93}	—	August 31, 2019	Haleakala	Pan-STARRS 1	·	600 m	MPC · JPL
826167	2019 QM_{126}	—	August 20, 2019	Cerro Paranal	Gaia Ground Based Optical Tracking	L4	5.7 km	MPC · JPL
826168	2019 RZ_{28}	—	September 7, 2019	Mount Lemmon	Mount Lemmon Survey	·	1.5 km	MPC · JPL
826169	2019 RX_{31}	—	September 6, 2019	Haleakala	Pan-STARRS 1	BRG	1.2 km	MPC · JPL
826170	2019 RO_{32}	—	February 16, 2010	Mount Lemmon	Mount Lemmon Survey	·	2.0 km	MPC · JPL
826171	2019 RZ_{32}	—	September 6, 2019	Haleakala	Pan-STARRS 1	L4	6.0 km	MPC · JPL
826172	2019 RQ_{33}	—	April 23, 2014	Cerro Tololo	DECam	·	830 m	MPC · JPL
826173	2019 RH_{65}	—	April 19, 2015	Cerro Tololo	DECam	L4	6.7 km	MPC · JPL
826174	2019 RL_{76}	—	April 23, 2014	Cerro Tololo	DECam	·	920 m	MPC · JPL
826175	2019 RT_{76}	—	September 6, 2019	Haleakala	Pan-STARRS 1	L4	6.3 km	MPC · JPL
826176	2019 RG_{91}	—	March 21, 2009	Mount Lemmon	Mount Lemmon Survey	·	750 m	MPC · JPL
826177	2019 RT_{104}	—	October 22, 2006	Kitt Peak	Spacewatch	·	1.1 km	MPC · JPL
826178	2019 SK_{2}	—	October 23, 2011	Mount Lemmon	Mount Lemmon Survey	H	470 m	MPC · JPL
826179	2019 ST_{3}	—	September 5, 2019	Mount Lemmon	Mount Lemmon Survey	·	460 m	MPC · JPL
826180	2019 SL_{5}	—	April 1, 2013	Mount Lemmon	Mount Lemmon Survey	·	1.1 km	MPC · JPL
826181	2019 SP_{9}	—	January 31, 2015	Haleakala	Pan-STARRS 1	·	770 m	MPC · JPL
826182	2019 SX_{11}	—	September 27, 2008	Mount Lemmon	Mount Lemmon Survey	·	3.6 km	MPC · JPL
826183	2019 SN_{12}	—	September 26, 2019	Haleakala	Pan-STARRS 1	T_{j} (2.99)	3.1 km	MPC · JPL
826184	2019 SD_{24}	—	August 17, 2009	Kitt Peak	Spacewatch	·	420 m	MPC · JPL
826185	2019 SL_{24}	—	September 16, 2009	Kitt Peak	Spacewatch	·	440 m	MPC · JPL
826186	2019 SB_{25}	—	October 26, 2009	Mount Lemmon	Mount Lemmon Survey	EOS	1.2 km	MPC · JPL
826187	2019 SW_{25}	—	October 26, 2014	Mount Lemmon	Mount Lemmon Survey	EOS	1.3 km	MPC · JPL
826188	2019 SU_{30}	—	September 25, 2019	Haleakala	Pan-STARRS 1	·	1.4 km	MPC · JPL
826189	2019 SV_{30}	—	October 26, 2011	Haleakala	Pan-STARRS 1	·	760 m	MPC · JPL
826190	2019 SD_{34}	—	October 28, 1998	Kitt Peak	Spacewatch	RAF	610 m	MPC · JPL
826191	2019 ST_{44}	—	May 11, 2015	Haleakala	Pan-STARRS 1	PHO	630 m	MPC · JPL
826192	2019 SB_{54}	—	September 9, 2015	Haleakala	Pan-STARRS 1	·	1.3 km	MPC · JPL
826193	2019 SW_{55}	—	October 8, 2012	Haleakala	Pan-STARRS 1	·	710 m	MPC · JPL
826194	2019 SN_{58}	—	November 23, 2014	Mount Lemmon	Mount Lemmon Survey	EOS	1.2 km	MPC · JPL
826195	2019 SU_{61}	—	September 17, 2009	Mount Lemmon	Mount Lemmon Survey	·	530 m	MPC · JPL
826196	2019 SO_{71}	—	January 2, 2011	Mount Lemmon	Mount Lemmon Survey	KOR	1.0 km	MPC · JPL
826197	2019 SK_{73}	—	August 22, 1998	Xinglong County	SCAP	·	1.4 km	MPC · JPL
826198	2019 SJ_{88}	—	April 19, 2015	Cerro Tololo	DECam	·	500 m	MPC · JPL
826199	2019 SL_{88}	—	September 28, 2019	Mount Lemmon	Mount Lemmon Survey	·	1.3 km	MPC · JPL
826200	2019 ST_{89}	—	September 20, 2019	Mount Lemmon	Mount Lemmon Survey	·	480 m	MPC · JPL

== 826201–826300 ==
back to top

Designation			Discovery			Properties		Ref
Permanent	Provisional	Named after	Date	Site	Discoverer(s)	Category	Diam.	Ref
826201	2019 SC_{98}	—	April 19, 2015	Cerro Tololo	DECam	·	530 m	MPC · JPL
826202	2019 SM_{110}	—	October 9, 2015	XuYi	PMO NEO Survey Program	·	860 m	MPC · JPL
826203	2019 SV_{151}	—	September 28, 2019	Mount Lemmon	Mount Lemmon Survey	H	370 m	MPC · JPL
826204	2019 SJ_{162}	—	April 25, 2015	Mount Lemmon	Mount Lemmon Survey	·	430 m	MPC · JPL
826205	2019 SX_{168}	—	September 28, 2019	Mount Lemmon	Mount Lemmon Survey	·	500 m	MPC · JPL
826206	2019 SE_{178}	—	September 22, 2019	Haleakala	Pan-STARRS 1	·	570 m	MPC · JPL
826207	2019 SX_{182}	—	September 22, 2019	Mount Lemmon	Mount Lemmon Survey	·	450 m	MPC · JPL
826208	2019 SG_{185}	—	September 26, 2019	Haleakala	Pan-STARRS 1	V	420 m	MPC · JPL
826209	2019 SH_{188}	—	September 28, 2019	Mount Lemmon	Mount Lemmon Survey	·	1.3 km	MPC · JPL
826210	2019 SQ_{194}	—	September 12, 2015	Haleakala	Pan-STARRS 1	MAS	530 m	MPC · JPL
826211	2019 SL_{196}	—	September 20, 2019	Mount Lemmon	Mount Lemmon Survey	·	420 m	MPC · JPL
826212	2019 TE_{8}	—	October 8, 2019	Mount Lemmon	Mount Lemmon Survey	AMO	520 m	MPC · JPL
826213	2019 TW_{8}	—	June 16, 2013	Mount Lemmon	Mount Lemmon Survey	·	2.5 km	MPC · JPL
826214	2019 TU_{10}	—	May 27, 2008	Kitt Peak	Spacewatch	·	560 m	MPC · JPL
826215	2019 TU_{11}	—	November 29, 2014	Mount Lemmon	Mount Lemmon Survey	·	1.9 km	MPC · JPL
826216	2019 TO_{12}	—	October 25, 2008	Kitt Peak	Spacewatch	·	2.1 km	MPC · JPL
826217	2019 TB_{20}	—	March 21, 2015	Haleakala	Pan-STARRS 1	·	570 m	MPC · JPL
826218	2019 TG_{28}	—	March 12, 2014	Mount Lemmon	Mount Lemmon Survey	·	770 m	MPC · JPL
826219	2019 TL_{28}	—	November 6, 2016	Mount Lemmon	Mount Lemmon Survey	·	470 m	MPC · JPL
826220	2019 TT_{28}	—	October 11, 2019	Mount Lemmon	Mount Lemmon Survey	·	2.0 km	MPC · JPL
826221	2019 TR_{34}	—	October 1, 2019	Mount Lemmon	Mount Lemmon Survey	·	770 m	MPC · JPL
826222	2019 TE_{35}	—	October 7, 2019	Mount Lemmon	Mount Lemmon Survey	·	1.9 km	MPC · JPL
826223	2019 TX_{36}	—	October 8, 2019	Haleakala	Pan-STARRS 1	·	830 m	MPC · JPL
826224	2019 TV_{37}	—	October 8, 2019	Mount Lemmon	Mount Lemmon Survey	·	920 m	MPC · JPL
826225	2019 TW_{49}	—	October 6, 2019	Haleakala	Pan-STARRS 1	H	300 m	MPC · JPL
826226	2019 TV_{59}	—	June 2, 2014	Haleakala	Pan-STARRS 1	·	1.2 km	MPC · JPL
826227	2019 TO_{67}	—	October 5, 2019	Haleakala	Pan-STARRS 1	·	710 m	MPC · JPL
826228	2019 TU_{69}	—	April 29, 2014	Haleakala	Pan-STARRS 1	·	740 m	MPC · JPL
826229	2019 TY_{81}	—	October 5, 2019	Haleakala	Pan-STARRS 1	·	510 m	MPC · JPL
826230	2019 UZ_{2}	—	April 17, 2012	Kitt Peak	Spacewatch	·	600 m	MPC · JPL
826231	2019 UM_{5}	—	January 4, 2012	Mount Lemmon	Mount Lemmon Survey	·	470 m	MPC · JPL
826232	2019 UA_{10}	—	April 27, 2009	Mount Lemmon	Mount Lemmon Survey	·	770 m	MPC · JPL
826233	2019 UP_{12}	—	October 5, 2019	Haleakala	Pan-STARRS 1	·	430 m	MPC · JPL
826234	2019 UT_{17}	—	November 30, 2003	Kitt Peak	Spacewatch	·	2.0 km	MPC · JPL
826235	2019 UH_{19}	—	October 9, 2015	Haleakala	Pan-STARRS 1	·	730 m	MPC · JPL
826236	2019 UX_{30}	—	August 29, 2009	Kitt Peak	Spacewatch	·	400 m	MPC · JPL
826237	2019 UR_{46}	—	April 23, 2014	Haleakala	Pan-STARRS 1	·	600 m	MPC · JPL
826238	2019 US_{59}	—	October 20, 2019	Mount Lemmon	Mount Lemmon Survey	·	680 m	MPC · JPL
826239	2019 UW_{61}	—	June 27, 2014	Haleakala	Pan-STARRS 1	·	1.4 km	MPC · JPL
826240	2019 UF_{74}	—	September 9, 2015	Haleakala	Pan-STARRS 1	·	730 m	MPC · JPL
826241	2019 UH_{75}	—	March 18, 2018	Haleakala	Pan-STARRS 1	·	550 m	MPC · JPL
826242	2019 UP_{77}	—	February 18, 2014	Mount Lemmon	Mount Lemmon Survey	·	740 m	MPC · JPL
826243	2019 UU_{84}	—	October 31, 2019	Haleakala	Pan-STARRS 1	·	940 m	MPC · JPL
826244	2019 UM_{91}	—	July 5, 2005	Mount Lemmon	Mount Lemmon Survey	·	490 m	MPC · JPL
826245	2019 UA_{117}	—	October 25, 2019	Haleakala	Pan-STARRS 1	·	800 m	MPC · JPL
826246	2019 UU_{126}	—	October 24, 2019	Haleakala	Pan-STARRS 1	·	890 m	MPC · JPL
826247	2019 VR_{2}	—	July 5, 2016	Haleakala	Pan-STARRS 1	H	350 m	MPC · JPL
826248	2019 VV_{4}	—	October 5, 2019	Haleakala	Pan-STARRS 1	·	500 m	MPC · JPL
826249	2019 VQ_{5}	—	July 1, 2011	Mount Lemmon	Mount Lemmon Survey	H	520 m	MPC · JPL
826250	2019 VD_{9}	—	November 5, 2019	Mount Lemmon	Mount Lemmon Survey	·	1.4 km	MPC · JPL
826251	2019 VG_{10}	—	November 2, 2019	Haleakala	Pan-STARRS 1	·	1.0 km	MPC · JPL
826252	2019 VC_{13}	—	November 7, 2019	Haleakala	Pan-STARRS 1	·	980 m	MPC · JPL
826253	2019 VV_{21}	—	November 5, 2019	Mount Lemmon	Mount Lemmon Survey	·	740 m	MPC · JPL
826254	2019 VV_{22}	—	November 5, 2019	Mount Lemmon	Mount Lemmon Survey	V	490 m	MPC · JPL
826255	2019 VF_{23}	—	November 1, 2019	Haleakala	Pan-STARRS 1	PHO	830 m	MPC · JPL
826256	2019 VL_{32}	—	November 2, 2019	Haleakala	Pan-STARRS 2	·	580 m	MPC · JPL
826257	2019 WD_{4}	—	October 27, 2019	Haleakala	Pan-STARRS 2	H	350 m	MPC · JPL
826258	2019 WF_{7}	—	September 3, 2016	Mount Lemmon	Mount Lemmon Survey	H	370 m	MPC · JPL
826259	2019 WL_{21}	—	March 4, 2016	Haleakala	Pan-STARRS 1	·	2.0 km	MPC · JPL
826260	2019 WP_{23}	—	November 27, 2019	Haleakala	Pan-STARRS 1	·	1.0 km	MPC · JPL
826261	2019 XF_{4}	—	December 3, 2019	Haleakala	Pan-STARRS 1	·	1.6 km	MPC · JPL
826262	2019 XM_{10}	—	December 7, 2019	Mount Lemmon	Mount Lemmon Survey	·	2.4 km	MPC · JPL
826263	2019 YT	—	August 14, 2012	Haleakala	Pan-STARRS 1	·	640 m	MPC · JPL
826264	2019 YO_{9}	—	December 28, 2019	Haleakala	Pan-STARRS 1	·	2.1 km	MPC · JPL
826265	2019 YO_{13}	—	March 10, 2011	Kitt Peak	Spacewatch	·	1.2 km	MPC · JPL
826266	2019 YX_{34}	—	December 24, 2019	Haleakala	Pan-STARRS 1	·	1.4 km	MPC · JPL
826267	2019 YV_{44}	—	December 30, 2019	Haleakala	Pan-STARRS 2	·	950 m	MPC · JPL
826268	2020 AF_{5}	—	January 1, 2020	Haleakala	Pan-STARRS 1	·	1.2 km	MPC · JPL
826269	2020 AK_{5}	—	January 1, 2020	Haleakala	Pan-STARRS 1	·	1.1 km	MPC · JPL
826270	2020 AV_{6}	—	January 1, 2020	Haleakala	Pan-STARRS 1	·	1.2 km	MPC · JPL
826271	2020 AZ_{23}	—	January 4, 2020	Mount Lemmon	Mount Lemmon Survey	·	940 m	MPC · JPL
826272	2020 AG_{24}	—	November 25, 2016	Mount Lemmon	Mount Lemmon Survey	H	380 m	MPC · JPL
826273	2020 BA_{2}	—	September 19, 2009	Zelenchukskaya	T. V. Krjačko, B. Satovski	H	320 m	MPC · JPL
826274	2020 BZ_{2}	—	September 6, 2013	Kitt Peak	Spacewatch	H	390 m	MPC · JPL
826275	2020 BX_{20}	—	January 25, 2020	Haleakala	Pan-STARRS 1	BRG	1.2 km	MPC · JPL
826276	2020 BF_{23}	—	February 13, 2015	Mount Lemmon	Mount Lemmon Survey	·	1.9 km	MPC · JPL
826277	2020 BK_{25}	—	January 9, 2015	Haleakala	Pan-STARRS 1	·	1.0 km	MPC · JPL
826278	2020 BH_{28}	—	January 21, 2020	Haleakala	Pan-STARRS 1	·	1.2 km	MPC · JPL
826279	2020 BC_{34}	—	February 8, 2011	Mount Lemmon	Mount Lemmon Survey	·	1.1 km	MPC · JPL
826280	2020 BA_{36}	—	December 4, 2018	Mount Lemmon	Mount Lemmon Survey	·	2.5 km	MPC · JPL
826281	2020 BL_{39}	—	January 19, 2020	Haleakala	Pan-STARRS 1	·	1.3 km	MPC · JPL
826282	2020 BK_{48}	—	January 25, 2020	Haleakala	Pan-STARRS 1	·	1.3 km	MPC · JPL
826283	2020 BY_{65}	—	January 26, 2020	Mount Lemmon	Mount Lemmon Survey	·	1.2 km	MPC · JPL
826284	2020 BP_{80}	—	January 21, 2020	Haleakala	Pan-STARRS 1	·	910 m	MPC · JPL
826285	2020 BR_{80}	—	January 24, 2020	Mount Lemmon	Mount Lemmon Survey	·	2.1 km	MPC · JPL
826286	2020 BF_{83}	—	January 24, 2020	Mount Lemmon	Mount Lemmon Survey	·	940 m	MPC · JPL
826287	2020 BC_{88}	—	January 28, 2015	Haleakala	Pan-STARRS 1	·	2.4 km	MPC · JPL
826288	2020 BQ_{88}	—	February 14, 2012	Haleakala	Pan-STARRS 1	·	780 m	MPC · JPL
826289	2020 BF_{91}	—	September 30, 2017	Mount Lemmon	Mount Lemmon Survey	·	1.7 km	MPC · JPL
826290	2020 BZ_{92}	—	December 26, 2005	Mount Lemmon	Mount Lemmon Survey	·	1.1 km	MPC · JPL
826291	2020 BV_{96}	—	April 13, 2011	Mount Lemmon	Mount Lemmon Survey	·	1.3 km	MPC · JPL
826292	2020 BZ_{98}	—	March 28, 2016	Cerro Tololo	DECam	·	1.2 km	MPC · JPL
826293	2020 BB_{117}	—	January 24, 2020	Haleakala	Pan-STARRS 1	·	2.6 km	MPC · JPL
826294	2020 BO_{117}	—	December 21, 2006	Mount Lemmon	Mount Lemmon Survey	·	820 m	MPC · JPL
826295	2020 BH_{136}	—	January 20, 2015	Mount Lemmon	Mount Lemmon Survey	EOS	1.3 km	MPC · JPL
826296	2020 BQ_{153}	—	July 13, 2013	Haleakala	Pan-STARRS 1	KON	1.8 km	MPC · JPL
826297	2020 CJ_{4}	—	March 31, 2003	Kitt Peak	Spacewatch	·	1.1 km	MPC · JPL
826298	2020 CE_{7}	—	November 6, 2018	Haleakala	Pan-STARRS 2	·	1.0 km	MPC · JPL
826299	2020 CQ_{7}	—	February 23, 2007	Kitt Peak	Spacewatch	H	350 m	MPC · JPL
826300	2020 DK_{8}	—	February 20, 2020	Mount Lemmon	Mount Lemmon Survey	·	1.3 km	MPC · JPL

== 826301–826400 ==
back to top

Designation			Discovery			Properties		Ref
Permanent	Provisional	Named after	Date	Site	Discoverer(s)	Category	Diam.	Ref
826301	2020 EW_{1}	—	January 22, 2015	Haleakala	Pan-STARRS 1	EUN	770 m	MPC · JPL
826302	2020 FT_{6}	—	March 23, 2020	Haleakala	Pan-STARRS 2	·	350 m	MPC · JPL
826303	2020 FH_{8}	—	March 28, 2020	Palomar Mountain	Zwicky Transient Facility	·	1.9 km	MPC · JPL
826304	2020 FN_{10}	—	March 24, 2020	Mount Lemmon	Mount Lemmon Survey	·	1.4 km	MPC · JPL
826305	2020 FY_{15}	—	April 11, 2003	Kitt Peak	Spacewatch	·	1.2 km	MPC · JPL
826306	2020 FM_{24}	—	March 25, 2020	Mount Lemmon	Mount Lemmon Survey	H	330 m	MPC · JPL
826307	2020 FT_{25}	—	August 26, 2012	Haleakala	Pan-STARRS 1	MRX	710 m	MPC · JPL
826308	2020 FD_{26}	—	February 12, 2011	Mount Lemmon	Mount Lemmon Survey	·	1.1 km	MPC · JPL
826309	2020 FS_{26}	—	March 29, 2020	Haleakala	Pan-STARRS 1	·	1.3 km	MPC · JPL
826310	2020 FD_{31}	—	March 25, 2020	Mount Lemmon	Mount Lemmon Survey	·	1.3 km	MPC · JPL
826311	2020 FF_{31}	—	March 19, 2020	Haleakala	Pan-STARRS 2	H	390 m	MPC · JPL
826312	2020 FK_{32}	—	May 2, 2016	Mount Lemmon	Mount Lemmon Survey	MIS	1.8 km	MPC · JPL
826313	2020 FL_{32}	—	November 6, 2010	Mount Lemmon	Mount Lemmon Survey	H	410 m	MPC · JPL
826314	2020 FP_{32}	—	March 16, 2020	Mount Lemmon	Mount Lemmon Survey	·	980 m	MPC · JPL
826315	2020 FZ_{33}	—	March 21, 2020	Haleakala	Pan-STARRS 1	·	1.3 km	MPC · JPL
826316	2020 FS_{34}	—	March 25, 2020	Mount Lemmon	Mount Lemmon Survey	L5	7.0 km	MPC · JPL
826317	2020 FQ_{36}	—	March 23, 2020	Haleakala	Pan-STARRS 1	H	320 m	MPC · JPL
826318	2020 FD_{37}	—	March 21, 2020	Haleakala	Pan-STARRS 1	·	1.2 km	MPC · JPL
826319	2020 FD_{38}	—	June 22, 2017	Haleakala	Pan-STARRS 1	·	840 m	MPC · JPL
826320	2020 FX_{38}	—	March 21, 2020	Haleakala	Pan-STARRS 1	·	1.5 km	MPC · JPL
826321	2020 FB_{40}	—	March 21, 2020	Haleakala	Pan-STARRS 1	·	1.4 km	MPC · JPL
826322	2020 GK_{4}	—	April 2, 2020	Mount Lemmon	Mount Lemmon Survey	MRX	780 m	MPC · JPL
826323	2020 GD_{5}	—	April 15, 2020	Mount Lemmon	Mount Lemmon Survey	·	1.4 km	MPC · JPL
826324	2020 GS_{8}	—	April 15, 2020	Mount Lemmon	Mount Lemmon Survey	·	1.3 km	MPC · JPL
826325	2020 GN_{14}	—	October 26, 2008	Kitt Peak	Spacewatch	·	1.3 km	MPC · JPL
826326	2020 GB_{25}	—	April 2, 2020	Mount Lemmon	Mount Lemmon Survey	·	1.4 km	MPC · JPL
826327	2020 GD_{28}	—	April 2, 2020	Mount Lemmon	Mount Lemmon Survey	·	1.4 km	MPC · JPL
826328	2020 GE_{28}	—	April 15, 2020	Mount Lemmon	Mount Lemmon Survey	TIN	810 m	MPC · JPL
826329	2020 GW_{28}	—	April 15, 2020	Mount Lemmon	Mount Lemmon Survey	H	270 m	MPC · JPL
826330	2020 HW_{11}	—	September 16, 2012	Kitt Peak	Spacewatch	·	1.1 km	MPC · JPL
826331	2020 HQ_{14}	—	April 16, 2020	Haleakala	Pan-STARRS 1	·	1.4 km	MPC · JPL
826332	2020 HT_{19}	—	January 14, 2019	Haleakala	Pan-STARRS 1	·	1.4 km	MPC · JPL
826333	2020 HY_{24}	—	August 14, 2012	Haleakala	Pan-STARRS 1	·	1.3 km	MPC · JPL
826334	2020 HU_{32}	—	April 20, 2020	Haleakala	Pan-STARRS 1	·	1.4 km	MPC · JPL
826335	2020 HZ_{37}	—	September 15, 2017	Haleakala	Pan-STARRS 1	·	650 m	MPC · JPL
826336	2020 HC_{38}	—	April 21, 2020	Haleakala	Pan-STARRS 2	EOS	1.3 km	MPC · JPL
826337	2020 HG_{38}	—	April 16, 2020	Mount Lemmon	Mount Lemmon Survey	·	1.2 km	MPC · JPL
826338	2020 HN_{38}	—	September 17, 2017	Haleakala	Pan-STARRS 1	·	850 m	MPC · JPL
826339	2020 HO_{39}	—	September 24, 2017	Haleakala	Pan-STARRS 1	·	980 m	MPC · JPL
826340	2020 HL_{47}	—	April 15, 2015	Mount Lemmon	Mount Lemmon Survey	H	320 m	MPC · JPL
826341	2020 HR_{47}	—	April 18, 2020	Haleakala	Pan-STARRS 1	·	1.3 km	MPC · JPL
826342	2020 HJ_{50}	—	August 29, 2016	Mount Lemmon	Mount Lemmon Survey	·	1.1 km	MPC · JPL
826343	2020 HR_{50}	—	June 19, 2010	Mount Lemmon	Mount Lemmon Survey	·	1.8 km	MPC · JPL
826344	2020 HV_{52}	—	April 20, 2020	Haleakala	Pan-STARRS 2	·	1.7 km	MPC · JPL
826345	2020 HO_{59}	—	April 22, 2020	Haleakala	Pan-STARRS 1	·	1.2 km	MPC · JPL
826346	2020 HK_{61}	—	December 4, 2010	Mount Lemmon	Mount Lemmon Survey	PHO	730 m	MPC · JPL
826347	2020 HZ_{62}	—	April 28, 2020	Haleakala	Pan-STARRS 1	H	260 m	MPC · JPL
826348	2020 HH_{66}	—	April 21, 2020	Haleakala	Pan-STARRS 1	·	1.4 km	MPC · JPL
826349	2020 HV_{76}	—	April 18, 2015	Cerro Tololo	DECam	KOR	910 m	MPC · JPL
826350	2020 HJ_{88}	—	April 21, 2020	Haleakala	Pan-STARRS 2	·	1.4 km	MPC · JPL
826351	2020 HM_{89}	—	April 25, 2020	Mount Lemmon	Mount Lemmon Survey	·	1.2 km	MPC · JPL
826352	2020 HB_{94}	—	April 20, 2020	Haleakala	Pan-STARRS 1	EOS	1.2 km	MPC · JPL
826353	2020 HU_{98}	—	April 21, 2020	Haleakala	Pan-STARRS 1	·	1.5 km	MPC · JPL
826354	2020 HG_{100}	—	April 22, 2020	Haleakala	Pan-STARRS 1	·	1.4 km	MPC · JPL
826355	2020 HS_{100}	—	June 18, 2015	Haleakala	Pan-STARRS 1	·	1.6 km	MPC · JPL
826356	2020 HW_{100}	—	January 22, 2015	Haleakala	Pan-STARRS 1	·	1.2 km	MPC · JPL
826357	2020 HY_{100}	—	January 19, 2015	Haleakala	Pan-STARRS 1	·	1.2 km	MPC · JPL
826358	2020 HZ_{100}	—	April 22, 2020	Mount Lemmon	Mount Lemmon Survey	JUN	890 m	MPC · JPL
826359	2020 HZ_{102}	—	April 27, 2020	Haleakala	Pan-STARRS 1	TRE	1.5 km	MPC · JPL
826360	2020 HY_{107}	—	April 19, 2020	Haleakala	Pan-STARRS 2	L5	6.2 km	MPC · JPL
826361	2020 HG_{108}	—	October 1, 2008	Mount Lemmon	Mount Lemmon Survey	·	1.1 km	MPC · JPL
826362	2020 HH_{109}	—	September 4, 2014	Haleakala	Pan-STARRS 1	·	890 m	MPC · JPL
826363	2020 HH_{112}	—	April 19, 2015	Cerro Tololo	DECam	·	1.1 km	MPC · JPL
826364	2020 HJ_{118}	—	April 16, 2020	Mount Lemmon	Mount Lemmon Survey	·	1.3 km	MPC · JPL
826365	2020 HV_{129}	—	April 21, 2015	Cerro Tololo	DECam	·	1.5 km	MPC · JPL
826366	2020 HK_{130}	—	April 21, 2020	Haleakala	Pan-STARRS 1	·	1.3 km	MPC · JPL
826367	2020 HF_{162}	—	January 20, 2015	Haleakala	Pan-STARRS 1	GEF	900 m	MPC · JPL
826368	2020 HZ_{162}	—	January 16, 2015	Haleakala	Pan-STARRS 1	PAD	1.2 km	MPC · JPL
826369	2020 HC_{166}	—	April 21, 2020	Haleakala	Pan-STARRS 1	AGN	900 m	MPC · JPL
826370	2020 HB_{210}	—	November 4, 2012	Mount Lemmon	Mount Lemmon Survey	·	1.2 km	MPC · JPL
826371	2020 HU_{210}	—	April 22, 2020	Haleakala	Pan-STARRS 1	·	1.2 km	MPC · JPL
826372	2020 JE_{10}	—	May 25, 2015	Haleakala	Pan-STARRS 1	H	310 m	MPC · JPL
826373	2020 JV_{10}	—	October 23, 2012	Mount Lemmon	Mount Lemmon Survey	·	1.4 km	MPC · JPL
826374	2020 JU_{13}	—	May 14, 2020	Haleakala	Pan-STARRS 2	·	1.7 km	MPC · JPL
826375	2020 JP_{22}	—	May 1, 2020	Haleakala	Pan-STARRS 1	·	1.6 km	MPC · JPL
826376	2020 JM_{24}	—	May 14, 2020	Haleakala	Pan-STARRS 1	EOS	1.3 km	MPC · JPL
826377	2020 JU_{24}	—	May 14, 2020	Haleakala	Pan-STARRS 1	EOS	1.2 km	MPC · JPL
826378	2020 JB_{27}	—	May 15, 2020	Haleakala	Pan-STARRS 1	MAR	870 m	MPC · JPL
826379	2020 JO_{28}	—	May 14, 2020	Haleakala	Pan-STARRS 1	·	1.5 km	MPC · JPL
826380	2020 JA_{35}	—	June 11, 2015	Haleakala	Pan-STARRS 1	·	1.1 km	MPC · JPL
826381	2020 JC_{35}	—	August 2, 2016	Haleakala	Pan-STARRS 1	·	1.3 km	MPC · JPL
826382	2020 JZ_{35}	—	May 14, 2020	Haleakala	Pan-STARRS 1	·	1.3 km	MPC · JPL
826383	2020 JA_{37}	—	May 14, 2020	Haleakala	Pan-STARRS 1	EUN	860 m	MPC · JPL
826384	2020 JH_{37}	—	September 20, 2008	Mount Lemmon	Mount Lemmon Survey	·	490 m	MPC · JPL
826385	2020 JA_{38}	—	June 11, 2015	Haleakala	Pan-STARRS 1	·	1.2 km	MPC · JPL
826386	2020 JA_{50}	—	May 11, 2020	Haleakala	Pan-STARRS 1	·	1.2 km	MPC · JPL
826387	2020 KO_{3}	—	May 19, 2020	Haleakala	Pan-STARRS 1	APO · PHA	330 m	MPC · JPL
826388	2020 KE_{8}	—	May 30, 2020	Haleakala	Pan-STARRS 1	H	390 m	MPC · JPL
826389	2020 KU_{10}	—	July 23, 2015	Haleakala	Pan-STARRS 1	·	1.8 km	MPC · JPL
826390	2020 KZ_{11}	—	May 30, 2014	Haleakala	Pan-STARRS 1	·	2.1 km	MPC · JPL
826391	2020 KV_{12}	—	May 18, 2020	Haleakala	Pan-STARRS 1	·	2.2 km	MPC · JPL
826392	2020 KZ_{14}	—	May 21, 2020	Haleakala	Pan-STARRS 1	GEF	770 m	MPC · JPL
826393	2020 KM_{17}	—	October 23, 2005	Catalina	CSS	H	440 m	MPC · JPL
826394	2020 KJ_{21}	—	October 22, 2011	Mount Lemmon	Mount Lemmon Survey	·	1.3 km	MPC · JPL
826395	2020 KB_{22}	—	January 15, 2007	Mauna Kea	P. A. Wiegert	·	1.4 km	MPC · JPL
826396	2020 KZ_{23}	—	May 17, 2020	Haleakala	Pan-STARRS 1	·	1.4 km	MPC · JPL
826397	2020 KB_{25}	—	May 24, 2020	Mount Lemmon	Mount Lemmon Survey	·	1.8 km	MPC · JPL
826398	2020 KP_{31}	—	October 28, 2011	Mount Lemmon	Mount Lemmon Survey	·	1.9 km	MPC · JPL
826399	2020 KE_{32}	—	May 28, 2020	Haleakala	Pan-STARRS 1	·	1.7 km	MPC · JPL
826400	2020 KV_{33}	—	May 20, 2020	Haleakala	Pan-STARRS 1	·	1.4 km	MPC · JPL

== 826401–826500 ==
back to top

Designation			Discovery			Properties		Ref
Permanent	Provisional	Named after	Date	Site	Discoverer(s)	Category	Diam.	Ref
826401	2020 KQ_{36}	—	May 30, 2020	Haleakala	Pan-STARRS 2	·	1.5 km	MPC · JPL
826402	2020 KJ_{37}	—	May 17, 2020	Haleakala	Pan-STARRS 1	·	1.2 km	MPC · JPL
826403	2020 KM_{39}	—	May 20, 2020	Haleakala	Pan-STARRS 1	·	1.9 km	MPC · JPL
826404	2020 KY_{40}	—	August 26, 2016	Haleakala	Pan-STARRS 1	·	1.6 km	MPC · JPL
826405	2020 KE_{42}	—	May 20, 2020	Haleakala	Pan-STARRS 1	EOS	1.4 km	MPC · JPL
826406	2020 KK_{56}	—	May 20, 2020	Haleakala	Pan-STARRS 1	·	1.7 km	MPC · JPL
826407	2020 KF_{57}	—	May 21, 2020	Haleakala	Pan-STARRS 1	·	900 m	MPC · JPL
826408	2020 LL_{12}	—	June 15, 2020	Haleakala	Pan-STARRS 1	·	1.9 km	MPC · JPL
826409	2020 LZ_{13}	—	May 20, 2015	Cerro Tololo	DECam	KOR	910 m	MPC · JPL
826410	2020 LL_{15}	—	June 14, 2020	Pleasant Groves	Holbrook, M.	·	2.6 km	MPC · JPL
826411	2020 LV_{16}	—	October 3, 2013	Haleakala	Pan-STARRS 1	V	510 m	MPC · JPL
826412	2020 MD_{6}	—	June 17, 2020	Haleakala	Pan-STARRS 2	H	500 m	MPC · JPL
826413	2020 MF_{6}	—	September 8, 2011	Kitt Peak	Spacewatch	·	1.6 km	MPC · JPL
826414	2020 ML_{6}	—	June 17, 2020	Haleakala	Pan-STARRS 1	·	1.7 km	MPC · JPL
826415	2020 MZ_{6}	—	December 9, 2018	Mount Lemmon	Mount Lemmon Survey	H	450 m	MPC · JPL
826416	2020 MJ_{7}	—	May 5, 2017	Mount Lemmon	Mount Lemmon Survey	H	360 m	MPC · JPL
826417	2020 MD_{9}	—	June 29, 2020	Haleakala	Pan-STARRS 1	·	510 m	MPC · JPL
826418	2020 MY_{9}	—	May 1, 2016	Haleakala	Pan-STARRS 1	·	500 m	MPC · JPL
826419	2020 MO_{17}	—	June 29, 2020	Haleakala	Pan-STARRS 2	H	520 m	MPC · JPL
826420	2020 MN_{18}	—	June 24, 2020	Haleakala	Pan-STARRS 1	·	850 m	MPC · JPL
826421	2020 MY_{32}	—	June 27, 2020	Haleakala	Pan-STARRS 1	H	360 m	MPC · JPL
826422	2020 MY_{33}	—	June 29, 2020	Haleakala	Pan-STARRS 2	PHO	770 m	MPC · JPL
826423	2020 MX_{40}	—	June 21, 2020	Haleakala	Pan-STARRS 1	·	1.3 km	MPC · JPL
826424	2020 MQ_{41}	—	June 21, 2020	Haleakala	Pan-STARRS 1	TEL	800 m	MPC · JPL
826425	2020 MX_{43}	—	June 17, 2020	Haleakala	Pan-STARRS 1	URS	2.1 km	MPC · JPL
826426	2020 MN_{51}	—	June 21, 2020	Haleakala	Pan-STARRS 1	·	2.0 km	MPC · JPL
826427	2020 ND_{4}	—	July 12, 2020	Mount Lemmon	Mount Lemmon Survey	·	2.5 km	MPC · JPL
826428	2020 NV_{7}	—	January 27, 2015	Haleakala	Pan-STARRS 1	(194)	1.1 km	MPC · JPL
826429	2020 OQ_{8}	—	July 18, 2020	Mount Lemmon	Mount Lemmon Survey	H	410 m	MPC · JPL
826430	2020 OO_{10}	—	December 6, 2015	Mount Lemmon	Mount Lemmon Survey	·	1.8 km	MPC · JPL
826431	2020 OL_{13}	—	July 18, 2020	Haleakala	Pan-STARRS 1	·	750 m	MPC · JPL
826432	2020 OE_{14}	—	July 17, 2020	Haleakala	Pan-STARRS 1	·	860 m	MPC · JPL
826433	2020 OO_{26}	—	July 29, 2020	Mount Lemmon	Mount Lemmon Survey	H	400 m	MPC · JPL
826434	2020 OK_{27}	—	October 25, 2009	Kitt Peak	Spacewatch	·	690 m	MPC · JPL
826435	2020 OT_{27}	—	July 25, 2020	Haleakala	Pan-STARRS 1	H	390 m	MPC · JPL
826436	2020 OJ_{29}	—	July 17, 2020	Haleakala	Pan-STARRS 1	·	2.8 km	MPC · JPL
826437	2020 OY_{29}	—	July 25, 2020	Haleakala	Pan-STARRS 2	H	490 m	MPC · JPL
826438	2020 OF_{30}	—	July 30, 2020	Mount Lemmon	Mount Lemmon Survey	·	950 m	MPC · JPL
826439	2020 OM_{30}	—	July 10, 2010	WISE	WISE	·	1.9 km	MPC · JPL
826440	2020 ON_{31}	—	July 18, 2020	Haleakala	Pan-STARRS 1	·	2.3 km	MPC · JPL
826441	2020 OZ_{31}	—	July 27, 2020	Mount Lemmon	Mount Lemmon Survey	·	900 m	MPC · JPL
826442	2020 OL_{34}	—	July 17, 2020	Haleakala	Pan-STARRS 2	TIR	2.4 km	MPC · JPL
826443	2020 OH_{36}	—	July 22, 2020	Haleakala	Pan-STARRS 1	·	2.4 km	MPC · JPL
826444	2020 OW_{37}	—	July 30, 2020	Mount Lemmon	Mount Lemmon Survey	V	450 m	MPC · JPL
826445	2020 OO_{38}	—	July 17, 2020	Haleakala	Pan-STARRS 1	·	760 m	MPC · JPL
826446	2020 OV_{48}	—	July 30, 2020	Mount Lemmon	Mount Lemmon Survey	·	2.3 km	MPC · JPL
826447	2020 OQ_{64}	—	July 29, 2020	Haleakala	Pan-STARRS 1	·	930 m	MPC · JPL
826448	2020 OW_{102}	—	July 20, 2020	Haleakala	Pan-STARRS 1	3:2	3.3 km	MPC · JPL
826449	2020 OE_{103}	—	July 22, 2020	Haleakala	Pan-STARRS 1	·	2.2 km	MPC · JPL
826450	2020 OJ_{104}	—	December 30, 2011	Kitt Peak	Spacewatch	ARM	2.5 km	MPC · JPL
826451	2020 OR_{105}	—	July 18, 2020	Haleakala	Pan-STARRS 1	·	2.5 km	MPC · JPL
826452	2020 OK_{107}	—	May 20, 2015	Cerro Tololo	DECam	·	790 m	MPC · JPL
826453	2020 OF_{110}	—	July 23, 2020	Haleakala	Pan-STARRS 1	·	2.5 km	MPC · JPL
826454	2020 OG_{112}	—	May 6, 2014	Haleakala	Pan-STARRS 1	EOS	1.2 km	MPC · JPL
826455	2020 PJ_{7}	—	May 21, 2017	Haleakala	Pan-STARRS 1	H	390 m	MPC · JPL
826456	2020 PX_{7}	—	December 25, 2010	Mount Lemmon	Mount Lemmon Survey	·	2.9 km	MPC · JPL
826457	2020 PZ_{7}	—	December 25, 2017	Haleakala	Pan-STARRS 1	·	550 m	MPC · JPL
826458	2020 PW_{9}	—	August 12, 2020	Haleakala	Pan-STARRS 2	H	360 m	MPC · JPL
826459	2020 PY_{12}	—	October 2, 2005	Mount Lemmon	Mount Lemmon Survey	·	790 m	MPC · JPL
826460	2020 PP_{23}	—	August 1, 2020	Mount Lemmon	Mount Lemmon Survey	H	420 m	MPC · JPL
826461	2020 PQ_{25}	—	August 14, 2020	Mount Lemmon	Mount Lemmon Survey	·	2.4 km	MPC · JPL
826462	2020 PJ_{28}	—	August 13, 2020	Mount Lemmon	Mount Lemmon Survey	·	510 m	MPC · JPL
826463	2020 PK_{37}	—	September 24, 2009	Catalina	CSS	·	2.6 km	MPC · JPL
826464	2020 PL_{77}	—	May 23, 2014	Haleakala	Pan-STARRS 1	·	1.8 km	MPC · JPL
826465	2020 PP_{83}	—	September 30, 2017	Cerro Paranal	Gaia Ground Based Optical Tracking	·	470 m	MPC · JPL
826466	2020 QS_{8}	—	June 2, 2014	Haleakala	Pan-STARRS 1	·	2.2 km	MPC · JPL
826467	2020 QT_{8}	—	March 31, 2019	Mount Lemmon	Mount Lemmon Survey	H	380 m	MPC · JPL
826468	2020 QE_{9}	—	August 29, 2014	Haleakala	Pan-STARRS 1	·	3.1 km	MPC · JPL
826469	2020 QS_{18}	—	October 5, 2013	Haleakala	Pan-STARRS 1	V	400 m	MPC · JPL
826470	2020 QB_{23}	—	August 19, 2020	Haleakala	Pan-STARRS 1	H	310 m	MPC · JPL
826471	2020 QG_{24}	—	August 19, 2020	Haleakala	Pan-STARRS 2	H	290 m	MPC · JPL
826472	2020 QH_{26}	—	August 16, 2020	Haleakala	Pan-STARRS 2	·	2.6 km	MPC · JPL
826473	2020 QN_{27}	—	August 22, 2020	Haleakala	Pan-STARRS 1	·	440 m	MPC · JPL
826474	2020 QR_{65}	—	August 19, 2020	Haleakala	Pan-STARRS 1	·	2.5 km	MPC · JPL
826475	2020 QN_{67}	—	April 18, 2015	Cerro Tololo	DECam	L4	5.6 km	MPC · JPL
826476	2020 QW_{69}	—	September 11, 2007	Mount Lemmon	Mount Lemmon Survey	·	380 m	MPC · JPL
826477	2020 QS_{77}	—	August 16, 2020	Haleakala	Pan-STARRS 1	V	440 m	MPC · JPL
826478	2020 QL_{83}	—	August 18, 2020	Haleakala	Pan-STARRS 1	·	770 m	MPC · JPL
826479	2020 QJ_{85}	—	July 4, 2014	Haleakala	Pan-STARRS 1	·	2.0 km	MPC · JPL
826480	2020 QO_{85}	—	August 19, 2020	Haleakala	Pan-STARRS 2	URS	2.4 km	MPC · JPL
826481	2020 QC_{88}	—	August 19, 2020	Haleakala	Pan-STARRS 1	H	340 m	MPC · JPL
826482	2020 QK_{88}	—	August 16, 2020	Haleakala	Pan-STARRS 1	NYS	760 m	MPC · JPL
826483	2020 QD_{110}	—	August 17, 2020	Haleakala	Pan-STARRS 1	·	2.6 km	MPC · JPL
826484	2020 RA_{21}	—	September 11, 2020	Haleakala	Pan-STARRS 1	URS	2.7 km	MPC · JPL
826485	2020 RP_{24}	—	April 23, 2014	Cerro Tololo	DECam	·	1.3 km	MPC · JPL
826486	2020 RM_{63}	—	November 27, 2013	Haleakala	Pan-STARRS 1	·	780 m	MPC · JPL
826487	2020 RY_{104}	—	April 18, 2015	Cerro Tololo	DECam	·	790 m	MPC · JPL
826488	2020 RD_{128}	—	September 9, 2020	Haleakala	Pan-STARRS 1	·	710 m	MPC · JPL
826489	2020 SJ_{1}	—	June 3, 2006	Siding Spring	SSS	H	460 m	MPC · JPL
826490	2020 SW_{21}	—	March 6, 2016	Haleakala	Pan-STARRS 1	·	570 m	MPC · JPL
826491	2020 SR_{24}	—	January 30, 2011	Mount Lemmon	Mount Lemmon Survey	·	590 m	MPC · JPL
826492	2020 SH_{28}	—	September 18, 2020	Mount Lemmon	Mount Lemmon Survey	ADE	1.5 km	MPC · JPL
826493	2020 SK_{34}	—	April 24, 2014	Cerro Tololo	DECam	ADE	1.1 km	MPC · JPL
826494	2020 SX_{34}	—	September 20, 2020	Mount Lemmon	Mount Lemmon Survey	·	2.2 km	MPC · JPL
826495	2020 SR_{63}	—	April 28, 2006	Cerro Tololo	Deep Ecliptic Survey	·	410 m	MPC · JPL
826496	2020 SP_{67}	—	September 26, 2020	Mount Lemmon	Mount Lemmon Survey	·	540 m	MPC · JPL
826497	2020 SH_{81}	—	January 31, 2017	Mount Lemmon	Mount Lemmon Survey	LIX	2.9 km	MPC · JPL
826498	2020 SC_{97}	—	September 18, 2020	Haleakala	Pan-STARRS 1	ELF	2.8 km	MPC · JPL
826499	2020 TP_{12}	—	May 1, 2016	Cerro Tololo	DECam	·	460 m	MPC · JPL
826500	2020 TM_{13}	—	September 25, 2014	Mount Lemmon	Mount Lemmon Survey	·	2.7 km	MPC · JPL

== 826501–826600 ==
back to top

Designation			Discovery			Properties		Ref
Permanent	Provisional	Named after	Date	Site	Discoverer(s)	Category	Diam.	Ref
826501	2020 TV_{15}	—	January 17, 2013	Kitt Peak	Spacewatch	·	970 m	MPC · JPL
826502	2020 TQ_{17}	—	October 23, 2015	Mount Lemmon	Mount Lemmon Survey	NAE	1.7 km	MPC · JPL
826503	2020 TP_{50}	—	March 18, 2018	Mount Lemmon	Mount Lemmon Survey	·	690 m	MPC · JPL
826504	2020 TJ_{56}	—	March 13, 2013	Haleakala	Pan-STARRS 1	·	2.4 km	MPC · JPL
826505 Xujianlin	2020 TO_{62}	Xujianlin	October 15, 2020	Mount Nanshan	J. Ruan, X. Gao	·	560 m	MPC · JPL
826506	2020 TA_{73}	—	October 15, 2020	Mount Lemmon	Mount Lemmon Survey	·	1.1 km	MPC · JPL
826507	2020 TM_{85}	—	October 15, 2020	Mount Lemmon	Mount Lemmon Survey	·	530 m	MPC · JPL
826508	2020 TQ_{92}	—	June 8, 2018	Haleakala	Pan-STARRS 1	VER	1.9 km	MPC · JPL
826509	2020 UD_{8}	—	January 12, 2013	Oukaïmeden	C. Rinner	EUN	900 m	MPC · JPL
826510	2020 UO_{54}	—	August 8, 2019	Haleakala	Pan-STARRS 1	·	1.9 km	MPC · JPL
826511	2020 UP_{56}	—	October 20, 2020	Mount Lemmon	Mount Lemmon Survey	PHO	580 m	MPC · JPL
826512	2020 VA_{7}	—	January 28, 2000	Kitt Peak	Spacewatch	·	630 m	MPC · JPL
826513	2020 VJ_{9}	—	May 20, 2015	Cerro Tololo	DECam	·	570 m	MPC · JPL
826514	2020 VO_{15}	—	May 23, 2015	Cerro Tololo	DECam	·	700 m	MPC · JPL
826515	2020 XX_{14}	—	January 29, 2014	Mount Lemmon	Mount Lemmon Survey	NYS	920 m	MPC · JPL
826516	2020 XS_{16}	—	April 23, 2014	Cerro Tololo	DECam	NYS	750 m	MPC · JPL
826517	2020 XN_{19}	—	September 30, 2005	Mount Lemmon	Mount Lemmon Survey	·	810 m	MPC · JPL
826518	2020 XF_{21}	—	September 5, 2016	Mount Lemmon	Mount Lemmon Survey	·	560 m	MPC · JPL
826519	2020 YE_{9}	—	March 17, 2018	Haleakala	Pan-STARRS 1	·	480 m	MPC · JPL
826520	2020 YM_{11}	—	May 21, 2015	Haleakala	Pan-STARRS 1	·	540 m	MPC · JPL
826521	2020 YJ_{13}	—	December 26, 2020	Mount Lemmon	Mount Lemmon Survey	V	500 m	MPC · JPL
826522	2020 YZ_{14}	—	December 22, 2020	Haleakala	Pan-STARRS 1	·	700 m	MPC · JPL
826523	2020 YG_{22}	—	December 23, 2020	Haleakala	Pan-STARRS 1	·	570 m	MPC · JPL
826524	2020 YL_{24}	—	December 24, 2020	Haleakala	Pan-STARRS 1	·	1.0 km	MPC · JPL
826525	2021 AR_{8}	—	October 8, 2016	Haleakala	Pan-STARRS 1	·	820 m	MPC · JPL
826526	2021 AJ_{15}	—	February 26, 2014	Haleakala	Pan-STARRS 1	·	790 m	MPC · JPL
826527	2021 AY_{15}	—	February 20, 2014	Mount Lemmon	Mount Lemmon Survey	·	620 m	MPC · JPL
826528	2021 AS_{16}	—	February 27, 2014	Kitt Peak	Spacewatch	·	780 m	MPC · JPL
826529	2021 AG_{18}	—	January 31, 2006	Kitt Peak	Spacewatch	MAS	540 m	MPC · JPL
826530	2021 AP_{20}	—	July 25, 2019	Haleakala	Pan-STARRS 1	·	950 m	MPC · JPL
826531	2021 AZ_{21}	—	December 19, 2016	Mount Lemmon	Mount Lemmon Survey	V	520 m	MPC · JPL
826532	2021 AY_{22}	—	January 15, 2021	Haleakala	Pan-STARRS 1	·	710 m	MPC · JPL
826533	2021 AO_{23}	—	January 15, 2021	Haleakala	Pan-STARRS 1	·	670 m	MPC · JPL
826534	2021 AC_{25}	—	June 27, 2014	Haleakala	Pan-STARRS 1	·	1.1 km	MPC · JPL
826535	2021 AD_{25}	—	February 24, 2014	Haleakala	Pan-STARRS 1	·	890 m	MPC · JPL
826536	2021 AH_{25}	—	September 4, 2019	Mount Lemmon	Mount Lemmon Survey	·	900 m	MPC · JPL
826537	2021 AA_{32}	—	January 14, 2021	Haleakala	Pan-STARRS 1	·	530 m	MPC · JPL
826538	2021 BS_{8}	—	March 20, 2010	Kitt Peak	Spacewatch	·	780 m	MPC · JPL
826539	2021 BD_{10}	—	November 26, 2016	Haleakala	Pan-STARRS 1	·	620 m	MPC · JPL
826540	2021 BT_{10}	—	May 22, 2018	Mount Lemmon	Mount Lemmon Survey	·	2.8 km	MPC · JPL
826541	2021 BX_{11}	—	January 16, 2021	Haleakala	Pan-STARRS 1	·	760 m	MPC · JPL
826542	2021 CO_{10}	—	February 7, 2021	Haleakala	Pan-STARRS 1	centaur	10 km	MPC · JPL
826543	2021 CK_{14}	—	September 30, 2005	Mauna Kea	A. Boattini	·	790 m	MPC · JPL
826544	2021 CK_{19}	—	February 12, 2021	Haleakala	Pan-STARRS 1	·	630 m	MPC · JPL
826545	2021 CW_{20}	—	February 23, 2007	Mount Lemmon	Mount Lemmon Survey	·	600 m	MPC · JPL
826546	2021 CK_{23}	—	June 12, 2018	Haleakala	Pan-STARRS 1	·	710 m	MPC · JPL
826547	2021 CR_{25}	—	March 29, 2004	Kitt Peak	Spacewatch	·	610 m	MPC · JPL
826548	2021 CP_{36}	—	September 16, 2013	Mount Lemmon	Mount Lemmon Survey	·	2.6 km	MPC · JPL
826549	2021 CY_{36}	—	March 28, 2016	Cerro Tololo	DECam	EOS	1.3 km	MPC · JPL
826550	2021 CF_{39}	—	May 7, 2014	Haleakala	Pan-STARRS 1	·	820 m	MPC · JPL
826551	2021 CK_{39}	—	March 12, 2010	Kitt Peak	Spacewatch	·	770 m	MPC · JPL
826552	2021 CX_{42}	—	October 20, 2008	Mount Lemmon	Mount Lemmon Survey	·	730 m	MPC · JPL
826553	2021 DV_{9}	—	April 23, 2014	Mount Lemmon	Mount Lemmon Survey	·	640 m	MPC · JPL
826554	2021 DZ_{10}	—	February 5, 2006	Mount Lemmon	Mount Lemmon Survey	MAS	530 m	MPC · JPL
826555	2021 EO_{7}	—	March 4, 2017	Haleakala	Pan-STARRS 1	·	920 m	MPC · JPL
826556	2021 EY_{10}	—	October 10, 2012	Mount Lemmon	Mount Lemmon Survey	·	570 m	MPC · JPL
826557	2021 EJ_{11}	—	January 27, 2017	Haleakala	Pan-STARRS 1	·	920 m	MPC · JPL
826558	2021 EZ_{14}	—	February 18, 2017	Haleakala	Pan-STARRS 1	·	750 m	MPC · JPL
826559	2021 EC_{25}	—	November 10, 2004	Kitt Peak	Deep Ecliptic Survey	MAS	540 m	MPC · JPL
826560	2021 EQ_{25}	—	September 24, 2011	Mount Lemmon	Mount Lemmon Survey	·	700 m	MPC · JPL
826561	2021 EF_{26}	—	March 15, 2021	Haleakala	Pan-STARRS 1	·	900 m	MPC · JPL
826562	2021 EU_{28}	—	April 8, 2006	Kitt Peak	Spacewatch	MAS	540 m	MPC · JPL
826563	2021 EB_{29}	—	March 15, 2021	Haleakala	Pan-STARRS 1	·	830 m	MPC · JPL
826564	2021 EB_{30}	—	March 12, 2016	Haleakala	Pan-STARRS 1	·	1.9 km	MPC · JPL
826565	2021 EE_{37}	—	February 24, 2015	Haleakala	Pan-STARRS 1	THB	2.3 km	MPC · JPL
826566	2021 EK_{41}	—	May 20, 2010	Mount Lemmon	Mount Lemmon Survey	NYS	870 m	MPC · JPL
826567	2021 EU_{42}	—	April 23, 2014	Haleakala	Pan-STARRS 1	·	680 m	MPC · JPL
826568	2021 EH_{53}	—	June 30, 2013	Haleakala	Pan-STARRS 1	·	1.5 km	MPC · JPL
826569	2021 FE_{4}	—	April 29, 2014	Haleakala	Pan-STARRS 1	·	720 m	MPC · JPL
826570	2021 FE_{8}	—	November 9, 2008	Mount Lemmon	Mount Lemmon Survey	V	470 m	MPC · JPL
826571	2021 FQ_{9}	—	October 9, 2015	Oukaïmeden	M. Ory	(2076)	600 m	MPC · JPL
826572	2021 FJ_{10}	—	September 29, 2011	Mount Lemmon	Mount Lemmon Survey	·	2.4 km	MPC · JPL
826573	2021 FR_{10}	—	May 2, 2014	Mount Lemmon	Mount Lemmon Survey	·	730 m	MPC · JPL
826574	2021 FT_{17}	—	March 19, 2021	Haleakala	Pan-STARRS 1	·	640 m	MPC · JPL
826575	2021 FH_{20}	—	August 27, 2011	Haleakala	Pan-STARRS 1	·	630 m	MPC · JPL
826576	2021 FO_{21}	—	March 21, 2017	Haleakala	Pan-STARRS 1	·	600 m	MPC · JPL
826577	2021 FB_{22}	—	July 10, 2018	Haleakala	Pan-STARRS 1	·	680 m	MPC · JPL
826578	2021 FF_{29}	—	July 30, 2014	Haleakala	Pan-STARRS 1	MAS	630 m	MPC · JPL
826579	2021 FZ_{29}	—	September 12, 2007	Kitt Peak	Spacewatch	MAS	490 m	MPC · JPL
826580	2021 FN_{33}	—	March 20, 2021	Haleakala	Pan-STARRS 1	V	430 m	MPC · JPL
826581	2021 FV_{37}	—	November 11, 2013	Mount Lemmon	Mount Lemmon Survey	·	2.3 km	MPC · JPL
826582	2021 GX_{15}	—	December 21, 2015	Mount Lemmon	Mount Lemmon Survey	·	1.3 km	MPC · JPL
826583	2021 GB_{16}	—	September 2, 2014	Haleakala	Pan-STARRS 1	·	860 m	MPC · JPL
826584	2021 GR_{22}	—	April 20, 2009	Kitt Peak	Spacewatch	EUN	690 m	MPC · JPL
826585	2021 GW_{22}	—	July 29, 2014	Haleakala	Pan-STARRS 1	·	860 m	MPC · JPL
826586	2021 GS_{28}	—	March 15, 2010	Kitt Peak	Spacewatch	·	790 m	MPC · JPL
826587	2021 GV_{31}	—	February 20, 2006	Kitt Peak	Spacewatch	·	840 m	MPC · JPL
826588	2021 GB_{34}	—	April 6, 2021	Haleakala	Pan-STARRS 1	·	570 m	MPC · JPL
826589	2021 GN_{34}	—	November 9, 2009	Mount Lemmon	Mount Lemmon Survey	·	490 m	MPC · JPL
826590	2021 GO_{38}	—	January 22, 2015	Haleakala	Pan-STARRS 1	·	1.7 km	MPC · JPL
826591	2021 GP_{38}	—	October 9, 2012	Mount Lemmon	Mount Lemmon Survey	·	550 m	MPC · JPL
826592	2021 GJ_{39}	—	April 5, 2017	Mount Lemmon	Mount Lemmon Survey	·	950 m	MPC · JPL
826593	2021 GB_{42}	—	January 14, 2016	Haleakala	Pan-STARRS 1	DOR	2.0 km	MPC · JPL
826594	2021 GE_{46}	—	May 21, 2017	Haleakala	Pan-STARRS 1	·	980 m	MPC · JPL
826595	2021 GL_{49}	—	April 14, 2010	Mount Lemmon	Mount Lemmon Survey	MAS	460 m	MPC · JPL
826596	2021 GV_{50}	—	August 18, 2018	Haleakala	Pan-STARRS 1	·	840 m	MPC · JPL
826597	2021 GJ_{51}	—	June 16, 2007	Kitt Peak	Spacewatch	·	770 m	MPC · JPL
826598	2021 GL_{51}	—	April 13, 2021	Haleakala	Pan-STARRS 1	·	1.1 km	MPC · JPL
826599	2021 GQ_{53}	—	February 17, 2010	Kitt Peak	Spacewatch	·	840 m	MPC · JPL
826600	2021 GZ_{69}	—	April 1, 2017	Haleakala	Pan-STARRS 1	·	910 m	MPC · JPL

== 826601–826700 ==
back to top

Designation			Discovery			Properties		Ref
Permanent	Provisional	Named after	Date	Site	Discoverer(s)	Category	Diam.	Ref
826601	2021 GG_{76}	—	July 12, 2013	Haleakala	Pan-STARRS 1	(5)	830 m	MPC · JPL
826602	2021 GN_{81}	—	July 12, 2018	Haleakala	Pan-STARRS 2	·	970 m	MPC · JPL
826603	2021 GB_{89}	—	April 10, 2021	Haleakala	Pan-STARRS 1	PHO	720 m	MPC · JPL
826604	2021 GF_{90}	—	April 8, 2021	Haleakala	Pan-STARRS 1	·	2.3 km	MPC · JPL
826605	2021 GA_{98}	—	April 23, 2014	Cerro Tololo	DECam	·	500 m	MPC · JPL
826606	2021 GK_{99}	—	March 13, 2010	Mount Lemmon	Mount Lemmon Survey	·	790 m	MPC · JPL
826607	2021 GO_{101}	—	April 10, 2021	Haleakala	Pan-STARRS 1	·	820 m	MPC · JPL
826608	2021 GP_{113}	—	November 4, 2019	Mount Lemmon	Mount Lemmon Survey	·	570 m	MPC · JPL
826609	2021 GV_{114}	—	November 10, 2015	Mount Lemmon	Mount Lemmon Survey	·	880 m	MPC · JPL
826610	2021 GL_{135}	—	September 12, 2007	Kitt Peak	Spacewatch	MAS	520 m	MPC · JPL
826611	2021 GZ_{150}	—	September 20, 2014	Catalina	CSS	(116763)	1.8 km	MPC · JPL
826612	2021 GJ_{152}	—	January 22, 2015	Haleakala	Pan-STARRS 1	·	1.6 km	MPC · JPL
826613	2021 GZ_{161}	—	February 17, 2010	Kitt Peak	Spacewatch	·	620 m	MPC · JPL
826614	2021 GX_{166}	—	April 9, 2021	Haleakala	Pan-STARRS 1	·	690 m	MPC · JPL
826615	2021 GT_{167}	—	September 30, 2011	Kitt Peak	Spacewatch	MAS	490 m	MPC · JPL
826616	2021 GC_{177}	—	August 20, 2011	Haleakala	Pan-STARRS 1	·	750 m	MPC · JPL
826617	2021 GA_{187}	—	April 9, 2021	Haleakala	Pan-STARRS 1	·	940 m	MPC · JPL
826618	2021 HT_{4}	—	February 22, 2004	Kitt Peak	Deep Ecliptic Survey	·	470 m	MPC · JPL
826619	2021 HV_{9}	—	June 23, 2017	Haleakala	Pan-STARRS 1	·	700 m	MPC · JPL
826620	2021 HR_{15}	—	April 16, 2021	Haleakala	Pan-STARRS 1	·	740 m	MPC · JPL
826621	2021 HV_{16}	—	April 22, 2021	Haleakala	Pan-STARRS 1	MAR	740 m	MPC · JPL
826622	2021 HJ_{27}	—	April 19, 2021	Haleakala	Pan-STARRS 1	EUN	790 m	MPC · JPL
826623	2021 JF_{14}	—	May 9, 2021	Haleakala	Pan-STARRS 1	·	850 m	MPC · JPL
826624	2021 JG_{16}	—	July 15, 2017	Haleakala	Pan-STARRS 1	·	910 m	MPC · JPL
826625	2021 JB_{21}	—	June 15, 2009	Mount Lemmon	Mount Lemmon Survey	(5)	980 m	MPC · JPL
826626	2021 JP_{22}	—	December 7, 2015	Haleakala	Pan-STARRS 1	·	710 m	MPC · JPL
826627	2021 JF_{26}	—	May 12, 2021	Haleakala	Pan-STARRS 1	V	400 m	MPC · JPL
826628	2021 JT_{26}	—	May 12, 2021	Haleakala	Pan-STARRS 1	·	730 m	MPC · JPL
826629	2021 JW_{27}	—	March 28, 2016	Cerro Tololo	DECam	·	1.4 km	MPC · JPL
826630	2021 JR_{29}	—	February 18, 2010	Mount Lemmon	Mount Lemmon Survey	·	780 m	MPC · JPL
826631 Frascati	2021 JR_{30}	Frascati	May 15, 2021	Calar Alto-Schmidt	E. Schwab, M. Micheli	·	1.0 km	MPC · JPL
826632	2021 JG_{50}	—	November 2, 2010	Mount Lemmon	Mount Lemmon Survey	·	960 m	MPC · JPL
826633	2021 JJ_{53}	—	May 9, 2021	Haleakala	Pan-STARRS 1	·	760 m	MPC · JPL
826634	2021 JE_{57}	—	May 3, 2021	Haleakala	Pan-STARRS 1	·	910 m	MPC · JPL
826635	2021 JW_{64}	—	November 23, 2014	Haleakala	Pan-STARRS 1	·	1.1 km	MPC · JPL
826636	2021 JJ_{79}	—	May 12, 2021	Haleakala	Pan-STARRS 1	·	770 m	MPC · JPL
826637	2021 KE_{6}	—	May 19, 2021	Haleakala	Pan-STARRS 1	·	720 m	MPC · JPL
826638	2021 KN_{8}	—	May 22, 2021	Mount Lemmon	Mount Lemmon Survey	KON	1.7 km	MPC · JPL
826639	2021 KM_{14}	—	May 19, 2021	Haleakala	Pan-STARRS 1	MAR	610 m	MPC · JPL
826640	2021 LC_{7}	—	June 14, 2021	Haleakala	Pan-STARRS 1	APO	180 m	MPC · JPL
826641	2021 LJ_{11}	—	June 8, 2021	Mount Lemmon	Mount Lemmon Survey	·	750 m	MPC · JPL
826642	2021 LU_{14}	—	August 15, 2017	Haleakala	Pan-STARRS 1	ADE	1.8 km	MPC · JPL
826643	2021 LG_{16}	—	August 31, 2014	Catalina	CSS	PHO	740 m	MPC · JPL
826644	2021 LX_{17}	—	June 11, 2021	Haleakala	Pan-STARRS 1	·	930 m	MPC · JPL
826645	2021 LH_{20}	—	January 16, 2015	Haleakala	Pan-STARRS 1	GEF	980 m	MPC · JPL
826646	2021 LM_{22}	—	June 14, 2005	Mount Lemmon	Mount Lemmon Survey	·	910 m	MPC · JPL
826647	2021 LL_{26}	—	July 25, 2017	Haleakala	Pan-STARRS 1	·	980 m	MPC · JPL
826648	2021 LS_{32}	—	June 9, 2021	Mount Lemmon	Mount Lemmon Survey	EUN	710 m	MPC · JPL
826649	2021 MV_{3}	—	December 26, 2017	Mount Lemmon	Mount Lemmon Survey	·	1.8 km	MPC · JPL
826650	2021 MK_{13}	—	October 29, 2017	Haleakala	Pan-STARRS 1	·	860 m	MPC · JPL
826651	2021 MR_{13}	—	June 20, 2021	Haleakala	Pan-STARRS 1	·	1.1 km	MPC · JPL
826652	2021 MD_{17}	—	June 21, 2021	Haleakala	Pan-STARRS 1	·	2.1 km	MPC · JPL
826653	2021 NU_{9}	—	March 5, 2016	Haleakala	Pan-STARRS 1	JUN	670 m	MPC · JPL
826654	2021 NA_{11}	—	November 5, 2016	Mount Lemmon	Mount Lemmon Survey	·	2.4 km	MPC · JPL
826655	2021 NQ_{29}	—	May 2, 2016	Haleakala	Pan-STARRS 1	·	1.2 km	MPC · JPL
826656	2021 NL_{31}	—	October 6, 2013	Catalina	CSS	·	880 m	MPC · JPL
826657	2021 NO_{52}	—	July 10, 2021	Haleakala	Pan-STARRS 1	·	1.2 km	MPC · JPL
826658	2021 NH_{55}	—	March 19, 2015	Haleakala	Pan-STARRS 1	·	1.3 km	MPC · JPL
826659	2021 ND_{56}	—	August 31, 2017	Haleakala	Pan-STARRS 1	·	1.3 km	MPC · JPL
826660	2021 OC_{4}	—	July 30, 2021	Haleakala	Pan-STARRS 1	·	2.2 km	MPC · JPL
826661	2021 OL_{6}	—	February 16, 2020	Mount Lemmon	Mount Lemmon Survey	·	1.2 km	MPC · JPL
826662	2021 OP_{7}	—	July 30, 2021	Haleakala	Pan-STARRS 1	EUN	630 m	MPC · JPL
826663	2021 PT	—	August 3, 2021	Mauna Loa	ATLAS	APO · PHA	150 m	MPC · JPL
826664	2021 PQ_{12}	—	January 19, 2015	Haleakala	Pan-STARRS 1	ADE	1.7 km	MPC · JPL
826665	2021 PH_{14}	—	November 17, 2018	Mount Lemmon	Mount Lemmon Survey	·	430 m	MPC · JPL
826666	2021 PD_{19}	—	March 4, 2016	Haleakala	Pan-STARRS 1	·	1.0 km	MPC · JPL
826667	2021 PY_{34}	—	October 24, 2011	Mount Lemmon	Mount Lemmon Survey	·	1.6 km	MPC · JPL
826668	2021 PH_{43}	—	January 22, 2015	Haleakala	Pan-STARRS 1	·	1.3 km	MPC · JPL
826669	2021 PC_{55}	—	August 4, 2021	Haleakala	Pan-STARRS 1	EOS	1.4 km	MPC · JPL
826670	2021 PO_{69}	—	February 4, 2019	Haleakala	Pan-STARRS 1	EOS	1.3 km	MPC · JPL
826671	2021 PO_{92}	—	August 3, 2021	Haleakala	Pan-STARRS 1	EOS	1.3 km	MPC · JPL
826672	2021 PU_{114}	—	June 2, 2014	Haleakala	Pan-STARRS 1	·	2.3 km	MPC · JPL
826673	2021 PV_{114}	—	May 7, 2014	Haleakala	Pan-STARRS 1	·	2.3 km	MPC · JPL
826674	2021 PT_{123}	—	September 24, 2016	Bergisch Gladbach	W. Bickel	EOS	1.4 km	MPC · JPL
826675	2021 PT_{127}	—	August 11, 2021	Haleakala	Pan-STARRS 1	·	1.9 km	MPC · JPL
826676	2021 PF_{174}	—	August 17, 2012	Haleakala	Pan-STARRS 1	·	1.3 km	MPC · JPL
826677	2021 PZ_{176}	—	March 24, 2014	Haleakala	Pan-STARRS 1	·	1.7 km	MPC · JPL
826678	2021 PF_{178}	—	September 8, 2016	Haleakala	Pan-STARRS 1	EOS	1.3 km	MPC · JPL
826679	2021 QB_{5}	—	January 20, 2020	Haleakala	Pan-STARRS 1	·	770 m	MPC · JPL
826680	2021 QW_{7}	—	October 5, 2005	Mount Lemmon	Mount Lemmon Survey	H	310 m	MPC · JPL
826681	2021 QK_{9}	—	August 28, 2021	Haleakala	Pan-STARRS 1	H	380 m	MPC · JPL
826682	2021 QA_{14}	—	January 17, 2015	Haleakala	Pan-STARRS 1	·	1.0 km	MPC · JPL
826683	2021 QC_{19}	—	February 5, 2019	Haleakala	Pan-STARRS 1	·	1.4 km	MPC · JPL
826684	2021 QF_{22}	—	April 3, 2019	Haleakala	Pan-STARRS 1	EOS	1.4 km	MPC · JPL
826685	2021 QF_{33}	—	September 27, 2016	Haleakala	Pan-STARRS 1	·	1.6 km	MPC · JPL
826686	2021 QT_{51}	—	August 17, 2021	Haleakala	Pan-STARRS 1	·	1.8 km	MPC · JPL
826687	2021 QL_{56}	—	February 28, 2019	Mount Lemmon	Mount Lemmon Survey	·	2.2 km	MPC · JPL
826688	2021 QH_{58}	—	September 2, 2010	Mount Lemmon	Mount Lemmon Survey	·	1.8 km	MPC · JPL
826689	2021 RP_{23}	—	September 7, 2021	Haleakala	Pan-STARRS 2	·	1.3 km	MPC · JPL
826690	2021 RM_{63}	—	September 19, 1998	Sacramento Peak	SDSS	·	2.2 km	MPC · JPL
826691	2021 RG_{74}	—	July 10, 2005	Kitt Peak	Spacewatch	·	550 m	MPC · JPL
826692	2021 RL_{79}	—	October 7, 2016	Haleakala	Pan-STARRS 1	EOS	1.4 km	MPC · JPL
826693	2021 RR_{80}	—	September 4, 2021	Haleakala	Pan-STARRS 1	·	1.6 km	MPC · JPL
826694	2021 RT_{85}	—	September 4, 2000	Kitt Peak	Spacewatch	EOS	1.0 km	MPC · JPL
826695	2021 RO_{101}	—	September 4, 2021	Haleakala	Pan-STARRS 1	·	2.3 km	MPC · JPL
826696	2021 RD_{105}	—	October 28, 2010	Mount Lemmon	Mount Lemmon Survey	·	2.0 km	MPC · JPL
826697	2021 RX_{105}	—	June 26, 2015	Haleakala	Pan-STARRS 1	·	2.5 km	MPC · JPL
826698	2021 RT_{107}	—	September 10, 2004	Kitt Peak	Spacewatch	·	1.1 km	MPC · JPL
826699	2021 RE_{119}	—	August 10, 2015	Haleakala	Pan-STARRS 1	·	1.9 km	MPC · JPL
826700	2021 RB_{141}	—	April 5, 2011	Kitt Peak	Spacewatch	·	1.2 km	MPC · JPL

== 826701–826800 ==
back to top

Designation			Discovery			Properties		Ref
Permanent	Provisional	Named after	Date	Site	Discoverer(s)	Category	Diam.	Ref
826701	2021 RV_{146}	—	December 1, 2011	Westfield	International Astronomical Search Collaboration	·	1.8 km	MPC · JPL
826702	2021 RS_{147}	—	September 4, 2021	Haleakala	Pan-STARRS 1	·	2.1 km	MPC · JPL
826703	2021 RM_{178}	—	May 23, 2014	Haleakala	Pan-STARRS 1	·	2.4 km	MPC · JPL
826704	2021 RJ_{179}	—	September 8, 2021	Haleakala	Pan-STARRS 1	EOS	1.4 km	MPC · JPL
826705	2021 RX_{179}	—	September 9, 2021	Haleakala	Pan-STARRS 2	·	1.6 km	MPC · JPL
826706	2021 RG_{199}	—	May 4, 2009	Kitt Peak	Spacewatch	EOS	1.4 km	MPC · JPL
826707	2021 RH_{205}	—	April 3, 2019	Haleakala	Pan-STARRS 1	·	1.8 km	MPC · JPL
826708	2021 RG_{246}	—	September 9, 2021	Haleakala	Pan-STARRS 1	·	1.7 km	MPC · JPL
826709	2021 RU_{253}	—	September 8, 2021	Haleakala	Pan-STARRS 1	·	2.1 km	MPC · JPL
826710	2021 SX_{24}	—	November 17, 2011	Mount Lemmon	Mount Lemmon Survey	·	2.2 km	MPC · JPL
826711	2021 SK_{25}	—	September 11, 2015	Haleakala	Pan-STARRS 1	·	2.2 km	MPC · JPL
826712	2021 SR_{26}	—	May 20, 2014	Haleakala	Pan-STARRS 1	·	1.9 km	MPC · JPL
826713	2021 SY_{26}	—	July 19, 2015	Haleakala	Pan-STARRS 1	EOS	1.2 km	MPC · JPL
826714	2021 SJ_{43}	—	November 4, 2016	Haleakala	Pan-STARRS 1	·	1.9 km	MPC · JPL
826715	2021 SK_{47}	—	September 30, 2021	Haleakala	Pan-STARRS 2	·	2.2 km	MPC · JPL
826716	2021 SS_{67}	—	January 31, 2013	Kitt Peak	Spacewatch	L4	6.9 km	MPC · JPL
826717	2021 TR_{17}	—	September 15, 2009	Kitt Peak	Spacewatch	L4	5.4 km	MPC · JPL
826718	2021 TN_{37}	—	February 5, 2016	Haleakala	Pan-STARRS 1	PHO	560 m	MPC · JPL
826719	2021 TW_{37}	—	April 1, 2014	Kitt Peak	Spacewatch	TIR	1.7 km	MPC · JPL
826720	2021 TK_{54}	—	August 31, 2011	Haleakala	Pan-STARRS 1	·	1.3 km	MPC · JPL
826721	2021 TO_{74}	—	November 2, 2010	Mount Lemmon	Mount Lemmon Survey	·	2.4 km	MPC · JPL
826722	2021 TH_{78}	—	October 8, 2008	Kitt Peak	Spacewatch	·	1.1 km	MPC · JPL
826723	2021 TL_{93}	—	March 16, 2005	Mount Lemmon	Mount Lemmon Survey	·	590 m	MPC · JPL
826724	2021 TC_{96}	—	July 26, 2015	Haleakala	Pan-STARRS 1	·	1.7 km	MPC · JPL
826725	2021 TA_{111}	—	October 13, 2021	Haleakala	Pan-STARRS 1	·	2.4 km	MPC · JPL
826726	2021 UY_{9}	—	October 30, 2021	Mount Lemmon	Mount Lemmon Survey	APO +1km	1.0 km	MPC · JPL
826727	2021 UE_{24}	—	January 31, 2016	Haleakala	Pan-STARRS 1	·	500 m	MPC · JPL
826728	2021 UB_{67}	—	July 28, 2014	Haleakala	Pan-STARRS 1	·	680 m	MPC · JPL
826729	2021 UZ_{89}	—	April 29, 2014	Haleakala	Pan-STARRS 1	·	2.2 km	MPC · JPL
826730	2021 VT_{21}	—	August 22, 2004	Kitt Peak	Spacewatch	·	1.7 km	MPC · JPL
826731	2021 VV_{23}	—	May 26, 2019	Haleakala	Pan-STARRS 1	·	2.0 km	MPC · JPL
826732	2021 VT_{82}	—	November 9, 2021	Haleakala	Pan-STARRS 1	·	710 m	MPC · JPL
826733	2021 VO_{96}	—	November 1, 2021	Haleakala	Pan-STARRS 1	L4	5.4 km	MPC · JPL
826734	2022 AW_{7}	—	April 30, 2016	Haleakala	Pan-STARRS 1	·	380 m	MPC · JPL
826735	2022 AH_{16}	—	December 12, 2018	Haleakala	Pan-STARRS 1	H	390 m	MPC · JPL
826736	2022 AJ_{30}	—	January 4, 2022	Mount Lemmon	Mount Lemmon Survey	H	420 m	MPC · JPL
826737	2022 AF_{45}	—	March 23, 2003	Kitt Peak	Spacewatch	·	960 m	MPC · JPL
826738	2022 BD_{14}	—	January 25, 2022	Haleakala	Pan-STARRS 2	H	420 m	MPC · JPL
826739	2022 BQ_{16}	—	January 24, 2007	Mount Lemmon	Mount Lemmon Survey	·	930 m	MPC · JPL
826740	2022 CY_{6}	—	February 8, 2022	Mount Lemmon	Mount Lemmon Survey	H	440 m	MPC · JPL
826741	2022 DK_{5}	—	December 5, 2010	Mount Lemmon	Mount Lemmon Survey	·	700 m	MPC · JPL
826742	2022 DK_{11}	—	October 19, 2016	Mount Lemmon	Mount Lemmon Survey	V	510 m	MPC · JPL
826743	2022 EC_{7}	—	September 19, 2015	Haleakala	Pan-STARRS 1	H	440 m	MPC · JPL
826744	2022 EW_{7}	—	March 2, 2022	Haleakala	Pan-STARRS 2	H	320 m	MPC · JPL
826745	2022 EH_{9}	—	October 26, 2016	Haleakala	Pan-STARRS 1	·	810 m	MPC · JPL
826746	2022 EQ_{17}	—	March 16, 2012	Haleakala	Pan-STARRS 1	·	560 m	MPC · JPL
826747	2022 FX_{3}	—	October 21, 2015	Haleakala	Pan-STARRS 1	H	310 m	MPC · JPL
826748	2022 FS_{5}	—	August 24, 2015	Cerro Paranal	Gaia Ground Based Optical Tracking	NYS	890 m	MPC · JPL
826749	2022 GM_{5}	—	February 12, 2010	WISE	WISE	APO	670 m	MPC · JPL
826750	2022 GV_{5}	—	April 7, 2022	MAP, San Pedro de	A. Maury, Attard, G.	·	2.7 km	MPC · JPL
826751	2022 GP_{6}	—	February 20, 2009	Kitt Peak	Spacewatch	·	390 m	MPC · JPL
826752	2022 GU_{18}	—	January 23, 2006	Mount Lemmon	Mount Lemmon Survey	·	800 m	MPC · JPL
826753	2022 KT_{8}	—	May 4, 2014	Haleakala	Pan-STARRS 1	·	1.0 km	MPC · JPL
826754	2022 MT_{2}	—	June 11, 2018	Mount Lemmon	Mount Lemmon Survey	·	2.0 km	MPC · JPL
826755	2022 OG_{27}	—	July 28, 2011	Haleakala	Pan-STARRS 1	MAS	500 m	MPC · JPL
826756	2022 OP_{27}	—	February 19, 2021	Mount Lemmon	Mount Lemmon Survey	NYS	990 m	MPC · JPL
826757	2022 PB_{32}	—	June 7, 2013	Haleakala	Pan-STARRS 1	(5)	820 m	MPC · JPL
826758	2022 QO_{9}	—	May 2, 2006	Kitt Peak	Spacewatch	·	880 m	MPC · JPL
826759	2022 QJ_{19}	—	May 20, 2018	Haleakala	Pan-STARRS 1	NYS	560 m	MPC · JPL
826760	2022 QT_{61}	—	May 18, 2014	Haleakala	Pan-STARRS 1	NYS	870 m	MPC · JPL
826761	2022 QM_{66}	—	April 23, 2014	Cerro Tololo	DECam	·	520 m	MPC · JPL
826762	2022 QU_{188}	—	November 13, 2012	ESA OGS	ESA OGS	·	1.4 km	MPC · JPL
826763	2022 QN_{194}	—	August 31, 2022	Haleakala	Pan-STARRS 1	·	1.6 km	MPC · JPL
826764	2022 QN_{210}	—	November 17, 2014	Haleakala	Pan-STARRS 1	·	1.0 km	MPC · JPL
826765	2022 QP_{214}	—	August 22, 2018	Haleakala	Pan-STARRS 1	·	870 m	MPC · JPL
826766	2022 RE_{6}	—	September 9, 2004	Sacramento Peak	SDSS Collaboration	NYS	740 m	MPC · JPL
826767	2022 RR_{7}	—	September 14, 2007	Mount Lemmon	Mount Lemmon Survey	MAS	610 m	MPC · JPL
826768	2022 RD_{17}	—	September 23, 2011	Haleakala	Pan-STARRS 1	MAS	550 m	MPC · JPL
826769	2022 RM_{31}	—	August 31, 2005	Kitt Peak	Spacewatch	·	2.1 km	MPC · JPL
826770	2022 RY_{31}	—	April 15, 2010	Mount Lemmon	Mount Lemmon Survey	·	910 m	MPC · JPL
826771	2022 RJ_{32}	—	October 28, 2008	Kitt Peak	Spacewatch	·	660 m	MPC · JPL
826772	2022 RQ_{98}	—	January 18, 2015	Haleakala	Pan-STARRS 1	·	1.3 km	MPC · JPL
826773	2022 SU_{8}	—	October 20, 2005	Mount Lemmon	Mount Lemmon Survey	·	440 m	MPC · JPL
826774	2022 SR_{26}	—	October 24, 2011	Kitt Peak	Spacewatch	·	980 m	MPC · JPL
826775	2022 SZ_{28}	—	September 24, 2022	Haleakala	Pan-STARRS 2	APO	270 m	MPC · JPL
826776	2022 SA_{33}	—	August 6, 2018	Haleakala	Pan-STARRS 1	NYS	930 m	MPC · JPL
826777	2022 SE_{99}	—	January 16, 2015	Haleakala	Pan-STARRS 1	·	1.4 km	MPC · JPL
826778	2022 SF_{120}	—	September 18, 2022	Haleakala	Pan-STARRS 2	WIT	730 m	MPC · JPL
826779	2022 SY_{122}	—	October 23, 1997	Kitt Peak	Spacewatch	·	1.3 km	MPC · JPL
826780	2022 SA_{146}	—	November 2, 2008	Mount Lemmon	Mount Lemmon Survey	·	1.5 km	MPC · JPL
826781	2022 SA_{154}	—	January 22, 2015	Haleakala	Pan-STARRS 1	·	1.2 km	MPC · JPL
826782	2022 SS_{155}	—	September 26, 2022	Haleakala	Pan-STARRS 2	·	1.5 km	MPC · JPL
826783	2022 SV_{174}	—	November 21, 2014	Haleakala	Pan-STARRS 1	·	800 m	MPC · JPL
826784	2022 SA_{188}	—	August 17, 2017	Haleakala	Pan-STARRS 1	·	1.1 km	MPC · JPL
826785	2022 SH_{230}	—	September 24, 2022	Haleakala	Pan-STARRS 1	·	1.6 km	MPC · JPL
826786	2022 SZ_{272}	—	September 24, 2022	Haleakala	Pan-STARRS 1	HNS	700 m	MPC · JPL
826787	2022 TZ_{33}	—	October 1, 2022	Haleakala	Pan-STARRS 2	·	1.8 km	MPC · JPL
826788	2022 UY_{17}	—	September 20, 2011	Kitt Peak	Spacewatch	MAS	520 m	MPC · JPL
826789	2022 UD_{24}	—	April 18, 2012	Mount Lemmon	Mount Lemmon Survey	·	1.1 km	MPC · JPL
826790	2022 UB_{48}	—	June 12, 2021	Haleakala	Pan-STARRS 1	·	1.6 km	MPC · JPL
826791	2022 UW_{55}	—	November 17, 2018	Mount Lemmon	Mount Lemmon Survey	·	1.0 km	MPC · JPL
826792	2022 UO_{98}	—	February 26, 2020	Cerro Tololo	Valdes, F.	·	1.4 km	MPC · JPL
826793	2022 UT_{107}	—	February 16, 2015	Haleakala	Pan-STARRS 1	KOR	950 m	MPC · JPL
826794	2022 VM_{4}	—	August 3, 2021	Haleakala	Pan-STARRS 1	·	2.4 km	MPC · JPL
826795	2022 VX_{8}	—	November 1, 2022	Haleakala	Pan-STARRS 2	·	2.2 km	MPC · JPL
826796	2022 WF_{17}	—	November 18, 2009	Kitt Peak	Spacewatch	EUN	870 m	MPC · JPL
826797	2023 MA_{12}	—	January 20, 2015	Haleakala	Pan-STARRS 1	·	2.2 km	MPC · JPL
826798	2023 NJ_{9}	—	July 1, 2023	Haleakala	Pan-STARRS 1	L5	7.1 km	MPC · JPL
826799	2023 OE_{6}	—	July 29, 2023	Nauchnyi	G. Borisov	T_{j} (2.86) · APO · PHA	380 m	MPC · JPL
826800	2023 RT_{3}	—	March 13, 2014	Kitt Peak	Spacewatch	H	390 m	MPC · JPL

== 826801–826900 ==
back to top

Designation			Discovery			Properties		Ref
Permanent	Provisional	Named after	Date	Site	Discoverer(s)	Category	Diam.	Ref
826801	2023 RE_{30}	—	August 30, 2016	Mount Lemmon	Mount Lemmon Survey	·	730 m	MPC · JPL
826802	2023 RR_{47}	—	October 6, 2012	Haleakala	Pan-STARRS 1	·	2.7 km	MPC · JPL
826803	2023 RM_{165}	—	January 7, 2016	Haleakala	Pan-STARRS 1	L5	5.9 km	MPC · JPL
826804	2023 SC_{16}	—	June 21, 2011	Kitt Peak	Spacewatch	·	2.0 km	MPC · JPL
826805	2023 SO_{39}	—	October 15, 2012	Haleakala	Pan-STARRS 1	·	1.8 km	MPC · JPL
826806	2023 TR_{11}	—	October 15, 2004	Mount Lemmon	Mount Lemmon Survey	·	520 m	MPC · JPL
826807	2023 TX_{79}	—	November 27, 2013	Haleakala	Pan-STARRS 1	·	1.1 km	MPC · JPL
826808	2023 UW_{14}	—	October 17, 2023	Kitt Peak	Bok NEO Survey	·	850 m	MPC · JPL
826809	2023 VX_{20}	—	January 26, 2006	Mount Lemmon	Mount Lemmon Survey	·	750 m	MPC · JPL
826810	2023 WX_{52}	—	May 6, 2006	Kitt Peak	Spacewatch	·	810 m	MPC · JPL
826811	2024 AU_{22}	—	April 6, 2014	Mount Lemmon	Mount Lemmon Survey	·	1.9 km	MPC · JPL
826812	2024 BS_{18}	—	December 23, 2012	Haleakala	Pan-STARRS 1	·	1.6 km	MPC · JPL
826813	2024 NH_{4}	—	October 1, 2005	Mount Lemmon	Mount Lemmon Survey	·	1.5 km	MPC · JPL
826814	2024 OW_{4}	—	September 20, 2003	Kitt Peak	Spacewatch	·	1.4 km	MPC · JPL
826815	2024 OL_{12}	—	September 20, 2020	Mount Lemmon	Mount Lemmon Survey	·	1.3 km	MPC · JPL
826816	2024 PA_{12}	—	December 14, 2015	Haleakala	Pan-STARRS 1	L5	5.9 km	MPC · JPL
826817	2024 PE_{35}	—	February 16, 2015	Haleakala	Pan-STARRS 1	·	710 m	MPC · JPL
826818	2024 QE_{23}	—	November 18, 2006	Mount Lemmon	Mount Lemmon Survey	·	1.4 km	MPC · JPL
826819	2024 RK_{18}	—	November 1, 2006	Mount Lemmon	Mount Lemmon Survey	·	1.3 km	MPC · JPL
826820	2024 RP_{24}	—	February 5, 2011	Haleakala	Pan-STARRS 1	·	1.6 km	MPC · JPL
826821	2024 RG_{53}	—	April 6, 2011	Mount Lemmon	Mount Lemmon Survey	·	2.3 km	MPC · JPL
826822	2024 RP_{62}	—	October 30, 2005	Kitt Peak	Spacewatch	·	1.1 km	MPC · JPL
826823	2024 RW_{73}	—	July 25, 2014	Haleakala	Pan-STARRS 1	·	1.2 km	MPC · JPL
826824	2024 SO_{12}	—	September 12, 2007	Kitt Peak	Spacewatch	·	1 km	MPC · JPL
826825	2024 SZ_{12}	—	October 24, 2011	Kitt Peak	Spacewatch	·	490 m	MPC · JPL
826826	2024 SL_{16}	—	September 23, 2013	Mount Lemmon	Mount Lemmon Survey	·	1.7 km	MPC · JPL
826827	2024 SK_{17}	—	October 19, 2003	Kitt Peak	Spacewatch	·	960 m	MPC · JPL
826828	2024 SO_{18}	—	November 28, 2010	Mount Lemmon	Mount Lemmon Survey	·	690 m	MPC · JPL
826829	2024 SW_{30}	—	January 3, 2017	Haleakala	Pan-STARRS 1	L5	5.6 km	MPC · JPL
826830	2024 SG_{49}	—	December 27, 2005	Kitt Peak	Spacewatch	·	1.1 km	MPC · JPL
826831	2024 SJ_{49}	—	October 10, 2007	Mount Lemmon	Mount Lemmon Survey	·	2.4 km	MPC · JPL
826832	2024 TL_{16}	—	January 14, 2011	Mount Lemmon	Mount Lemmon Survey	·	580 m	MPC · JPL
826833	2024 TS_{25}	—	February 27, 2016	Mount Lemmon	Mount Lemmon Survey	·	1.5 km	MPC · JPL
826834	2024 TJ_{32}	—	November 20, 2012	Mount Lemmon	Mount Lemmon Survey	·	780 m	MPC · JPL
826835	2024 US_{25}	—	September 8, 2015	Haleakala	Pan-STARRS 1	·	1.0 km	MPC · JPL
826836	2024 UK_{38}	—	November 1, 2018	Mount Lemmon	Mount Lemmon Survey	·	2.0 km	MPC · JPL
826837	2024 VZ_{6}	—	March 10, 2022	Haleakala	Pan-STARRS 2	·	980 m	MPC · JPL
826838	2024 VJ_{13}	—	April 26, 2014	Cerro Tololo	DECam	·	820 m	MPC · JPL
826839	2024 VE_{20}	—	November 1, 2008	Mount Lemmon	Mount Lemmon Survey	·	1.7 km	MPC · JPL
826840	2024 WF_{8}	—	February 13, 2011	Mount Lemmon	Mount Lemmon Survey	·	1.4 km	MPC · JPL
826841	2024 WC_{40}	—	March 10, 2016	Mount Lemmon	Mount Lemmon Survey	·	1.8 km	MPC · JPL
826842	2024 WD_{56}	—	October 11, 2012	Mount Lemmon	Mount Lemmon Survey	·	2.1 km	MPC · JPL
826843	2024 XD_{5}	—	September 9, 2015	Haleakala	Pan-STARRS 1	·	840 m	MPC · JPL
826844	2024 XU_{21}	—	December 21, 2008	Kitt Peak	Spacewatch	·	690 m	MPC · JPL
826845	2024 XE_{31}	—	March 5, 2011	Mount Lemmon	Mount Lemmon Survey	·	1.4 km	MPC · JPL
826846	2024 XW_{33}	—	September 11, 2015	Haleakala	Pan-STARRS 1	·	780 m	MPC · JPL
826847	2024 YK_{11}	—	December 30, 2024	Haleakala	Pan-STARRS 2	T_{j} (2.85) · APO +1km	1.1 km	MPC · JPL
826848	2024 YQ_{16}	—	January 27, 2006	Mount Lemmon	Mount Lemmon Survey	·	880 m	MPC · JPL
826849	2024 YB_{19}	—	November 20, 2008	Kitt Peak	Spacewatch	·	980 m	MPC · JPL
826850	2024 YK_{25}	—	August 22, 2007	Anderson Mesa	LONEOS	·	1.1 km	MPC · JPL
826851	2024 YL_{45}	—	September 14, 2017	Haleakala	Pan-STARRS 1	·	1.3 km	MPC · JPL
826852	2024 YK_{55}	—	February 28, 2014	Haleakala	Pan-STARRS 1	L4	6.3 km	MPC · JPL
826853	2025 AQ_{10}	—	January 14, 2011	Mount Lemmon	Mount Lemmon Survey	·	1.4 km	MPC · JPL
826854	2025 AX_{10}	—	March 21, 2015	Haleakala	Pan-STARRS 1	·	550 m	MPC · JPL
826855	2025 AQ_{15}	—	February 28, 2014	Haleakala	Pan-STARRS 1	L4	5.8 km	MPC · JPL
826856 Commodorecochran	2025 BN_{9}	Commodorecochran	January 25, 2025	Starkville	Gout, J.-F.	L4	4.3 km	MPC · JPL
826857	2025 BF_{11}	—	March 22, 2009	Mount Lemmon	Mount Lemmon Survey	·	690 m	MPC · JPL
826858	2025 BO_{13}	—	May 15, 2016	Cerro Tololo	DECam	L4	5.5 km	MPC · JPL
826859	2025 DD_{9}	—	May 23, 2014	Haleakala	Pan-STARRS 1	·	1.6 km	MPC · JPL
826860	2025 DE_{10}	—	September 4, 2011	Haleakala	Pan-STARRS 1	·	1.6 km	MPC · JPL
826861	2025 DC_{52}	—	January 16, 2015	Haleakala	Pan-STARRS 1	·	1.2 km	MPC · JPL
826862	2025 ED_{4}	—	March 27, 2016	Mount Lemmon	Mount Lemmon Survey	·	1.3 km	MPC · JPL
826863	2025 FK_{23}	—	February 17, 2020	Mount Lemmon	Mount Lemmon Survey	·	1.3 km	MPC · JPL
826864	2025 HK_{24}	—	September 13, 2021	Haleakala	Pan-STARRS 2	·	2.2 km	MPC · JPL
826865	1979 MW_{5}	—	June 25, 1979	Siding Spring	E. F. Helin, S. J. Bus	·	2.7 km	MPC · JPL
826866	1981 EN_{35}	—	March 2, 1981	Siding Spring	S. J. Bus	·	1.4 km	MPC · JPL
826867	1984 QL_{1}	—	August 29, 1984	Palomar Mountain	C. T. Kowal	T_{j} (2.95)	3.9 km	MPC · JPL
826868	1986 JE	—	May 9, 1986	Kitt Peak	Spacewatch	H	420 m	MPC · JPL
826869	1989 AZ	—	January 8, 1989	Palomar Mountain	C. S. Shoemaker, E. M. Shoemaker	APO	470 m	MPC · JPL
826870 Iancooper	1991 PN	Iancooper	August 5, 1991	Cerro Tololo	Rehner, D. M.	EOS	1.6 km	MPC · JPL
826871	1991 PW_{22}	—	February 14, 2010	Mount Lemmon	Mount Lemmon Survey	·	1.1 km	MPC · JPL
826872	1993 FB_{85}	—	April 15, 2002	Palomar	NEAT	·	1.5 km	MPC · JPL
826873	1993 ME_{1}	—	June 23, 1993	Palomar Mountain	E. F. Helin, K. J. Lawrence	·	1.8 km	MPC · JPL
826874	1993 OW_{5}	—	July 20, 1993	La Silla	E. W. Elst	·	1.3 km	MPC · JPL
826875	1993 OP_{9}	—	July 20, 1993	La Silla	E. W. Elst	·	890 m	MPC · JPL
826876	1993 TC_{11}	—	October 15, 1993	Kitt Peak	Spacewatch	·	490 m	MPC · JPL
826877	1993 TC_{45}	—	November 5, 2010	Mount Lemmon	Mount Lemmon Survey	·	970 m	MPC · JPL
826878	1993 VE_{6}	—	November 9, 1993	Kitt Peak	Spacewatch	·	420 m	MPC · JPL
826879	1994 ND_{5}	—	July 11, 1994	La Silla	H. Debehogne, E. W. Elst	·	1.8 km	MPC · JPL
826880	1994 PY_{8}	—	August 10, 1994	La Silla	E. W. Elst	·	1.5 km	MPC · JPL
826881	1994 PF_{31}	—	September 1, 1994	Kitt Peak	Spacewatch	·	1.2 km	MPC · JPL
826882	1994 RD_{30}	—	September 13, 1994	Kitt Peak	Spacewatch	·	1.6 km	MPC · JPL
826883	1995 OA_{11}	—	July 27, 1995	Kitt Peak	Spacewatch	·	480 m	MPC · JPL
826884	1995 OF_{18}	—	July 27, 1995	Kitt Peak	Spacewatch	·	950 m	MPC · JPL
826885	1995 OW_{18}	—	July 26, 1995	Kitt Peak	Spacewatch	·	330 m	MPC · JPL
826886	1995 OX_{18}	—	July 22, 1995	Kitt Peak	Spacewatch	·	1.9 km	MPC · JPL
826887	1995 QK_{3}	—	August 28, 1995	Kitt Peak	Spacewatch	·	330 m	MPC · JPL
826888	1995 QL_{9}	—	August 28, 1995	Kitt Peak	Spacewatch	·	1.6 km	MPC · JPL
826889	1995 RT	—	September 15, 1995	Haleakala	AMOS	·	1.8 km	MPC · JPL
826890	1995 SY_{1}	—	September 21, 1995	Haleakala	AMOS	PHO	840 m	MPC · JPL
826891	1995 SP_{12}	—	September 18, 1995	Kitt Peak	Spacewatch	·	890 m	MPC · JPL
826892	1995 SQ_{16}	—	September 18, 1995	Kitt Peak	Spacewatch	VER	2.1 km	MPC · JPL
826893	1995 SU_{17}	—	September 18, 1995	Kitt Peak	Spacewatch	·	580 m	MPC · JPL
826894	1995 SL_{42}	—	September 25, 1995	Kitt Peak	Spacewatch	KOR	1.1 km	MPC · JPL
826895	1995 SM_{57}	—	September 17, 1995	Kitt Peak	Spacewatch	·	440 m	MPC · JPL
826896	1995 SR_{70}	—	September 18, 1995	Kitt Peak	Spacewatch	·	1.2 km	MPC · JPL
826897	1995 SU_{74}	—	September 19, 1995	Kitt Peak	Spacewatch	·	1.3 km	MPC · JPL
826898	1995 SS_{81}	—	September 22, 1995	Kitt Peak	Spacewatch	·	920 m	MPC · JPL
826899	1995 SK_{88}	—	September 26, 1995	Kitt Peak	Spacewatch	·	1.0 km	MPC · JPL
826900	1995 SJ_{90}	—	January 29, 2011	Kitt Peak	Spacewatch	·	710 m	MPC · JPL

== 826901–827000 ==
back to top

Designation			Discovery			Properties		Ref
Permanent	Provisional	Named after	Date	Site	Discoverer(s)	Category	Diam.	Ref
826901	1995 TH_{4}	—	September 30, 1995	Kitt Peak	Spacewatch	·	1.2 km	MPC · JPL
826902	1995 TC_{5}	—	October 15, 1995	Kitt Peak	Spacewatch	·	610 m	MPC · JPL
826903	1995 TR_{10}	—	October 2, 1995	Kitt Peak	Spacewatch	·	1.5 km	MPC · JPL
826904	1995 UU_{25}	—	October 20, 1995	Kitt Peak	Spacewatch	·	1.2 km	MPC · JPL
826905	1995 UJ_{44}	—	October 26, 1995	Kitt Peak	Spacewatch	·	1.3 km	MPC · JPL
826906	1995 UH_{61}	—	October 24, 1995	Kitt Peak	Spacewatch	·	1.3 km	MPC · JPL
826907	1995 VC_{5}	—	November 14, 1995	Kitt Peak	Spacewatch	·	1.0 km	MPC · JPL
826908	1995 VE_{7}	—	November 14, 1995	Kitt Peak	Spacewatch	·	1.3 km	MPC · JPL
826909	1995 VM_{17}	—	November 15, 1995	Kitt Peak	Spacewatch	·	1.2 km	MPC · JPL
826910	1995 WA_{15}	—	October 28, 1995	Kitt Peak	Spacewatch	·	970 m	MPC · JPL
826911	1995 WE_{18}	—	November 17, 1995	Kitt Peak	Spacewatch	·	860 m	MPC · JPL
826912	1995 YT_{5}	—	December 16, 1995	Kitt Peak	Spacewatch	·	700 m	MPC · JPL
826913	1996 AK_{17}	—	January 13, 1996	Kitt Peak	Spacewatch	·	1.4 km	MPC · JPL
826914	1996 FQ_{3}	—	March 26, 1996	Haleakala	NEAT	AMO	250 m	MPC · JPL
826915	1996 FU_{9}	—	March 20, 1996	Kitt Peak	Spacewatch	·	890 m	MPC · JPL
826916	1996 HL_{27}	—	April 17, 1996	Kitt Peak	Spacewatch	·	740 m	MPC · JPL
826917	1996 RV_{6}	—	September 5, 1996	Kitt Peak	Spacewatch	·	810 m	MPC · JPL
826918	1996 TH_{1}	—	October 6, 1996	Prescott	P. G. Comba	·	3.1 km	MPC · JPL
826919	1996 TU_{31}	—	October 9, 1996	Kitt Peak	Spacewatch	·	1.5 km	MPC · JPL
826920	1996 TF_{45}	—	October 7, 1996	Kitt Peak	Spacewatch	·	1.1 km	MPC · JPL
826921	1996 TX_{60}	—	September 24, 1960	Palomar Mountain	C. J. van Houten, I. van Houten-Groeneveld, T. Gehrels	·	1.9 km	MPC · JPL
826922	1996 VO_{14}	—	November 5, 1996	Kitt Peak	Spacewatch	·	510 m	MPC · JPL
826923	1996 VK_{15}	—	November 5, 1996	Kitt Peak	Spacewatch	·	1.4 km	MPC · JPL
826924	1996 VU_{19}	—	November 7, 1996	Kitt Peak	Spacewatch	·	1.3 km	MPC · JPL
826925	1996 VC_{29}	—	November 13, 1996	Kitt Peak	Spacewatch	3:2	2.7 km	MPC · JPL
826926	1996 VD_{42}	—	November 5, 1996	Kitt Peak	Spacewatch	·	2.2 km	MPC · JPL
826927	1996 XM_{36}	—	December 14, 1996	Kitt Peak	Spacewatch	·	800 m	MPC · JPL
826928	1997 EV_{22}	—	March 10, 1997	Kitt Peak	Spacewatch	·	1.1 km	MPC · JPL
826929	1997 KP	—	May 30, 1997	Mount Hopkins	C. W. Hergenrother	·	1.7 km	MPC · JPL
826930 Charlottesmall	1997 RN_{7}	Chalottesmall	September 10, 1997	Dominion	D. D. Balam, G. C. L. Aikman	·	1.1 km	MPC · JPL
826931	1997 SB_{17}	—	September 28, 1997	Mauna Kea	C. Veillet, R. Shanks	EUN	830 m	MPC · JPL
826932	1997 SD_{23}	—	September 29, 1997	Kitt Peak	Spacewatch	·	750 m	MPC · JPL
826933	1997 TN	—	October 2, 1997	Mauna Kea	C. Veillet, R. Shanks	·	2.2 km	MPC · JPL
826934	1997 VU_{9}	—	November 2, 1997	Kitt Peak	Spacewatch	·	1.3 km	MPC · JPL
826935	1998 BN_{35}	—	January 28, 1998	Kitt Peak	Spacewatch	KON	1.7 km	MPC · JPL
826936	1998 HH_{49}	—	April 28, 1998	Kitt Peak	Spacewatch	APO · PHA	190 m	MPC · JPL
826937	1998 JG_{2}	—	May 1, 1998	Mount Hopkins	C. W. Hergenrother, M. J. Holman	·	680 m	MPC · JPL
826938	1998 KK_{16}	—	April 24, 1998	Socorro	LINEAR	·	1.4 km	MPC · JPL
826939	1998 KH_{69}	—	October 4, 2013	Mount Lemmon	Mount Lemmon Survey	PHO	560 m	MPC · JPL
826940	1998 MM_{14}	—	June 24, 1998	Socorro	LINEAR	·	550 m	MPC · JPL
826941	1998 QK_{28}	—	August 25, 1998	Socorro	LINEAR	APO · PHA	440 m	MPC · JPL
826942	1998 QL_{112}	—	August 26, 1998	Kitt Peak	Spacewatch	·	2.0 km	MPC · JPL
826943	1998 RK_{12}	—	September 14, 1998	Kitt Peak	Spacewatch	PHO	660 m	MPC · JPL
826944	1998 RN_{81}	—	September 14, 1998	Kitt Peak	Spacewatch	·	910 m	MPC · JPL
826945	1998 RS_{81}	—	September 19, 2012	Mount Lemmon	Mount Lemmon Survey	NEM	1.6 km	MPC · JPL
826946	1998 SG_{2}	—	August 17, 1998	Socorro	LINEAR	AMO	480 m	MPC · JPL
826947	1998 SL_{172}	—	September 19, 1998	Sacramento Peak	SDSS	·	1.0 km	MPC · JPL
826948	1998 SM_{172}	—	September 19, 1998	Sacramento Peak	SDSS	(29841)	1.1 km	MPC · JPL
826949	1998 SB_{174}	—	October 12, 1998	Kitt Peak	Spacewatch	·	2.5 km	MPC · JPL
826950	1998 SO_{174}	—	September 19, 1998	Sacramento Peak	SDSS	·	2.1 km	MPC · JPL
826951	1998 SS_{174}	—	September 19, 1998	Sacramento Peak	SDSS	AEO	740 m	MPC · JPL
826952	1998 SF_{175}	—	September 19, 1998	Sacramento Peak	SDSS	TIR	2.6 km	MPC · JPL
826953	1998 SH_{175}	—	September 19, 1998	Sacramento Peak	SDSS	·	1.2 km	MPC · JPL
826954	1998 SE_{179}	—	June 30, 2013	Haleakala	Pan-STARRS 1	·	830 m	MPC · JPL
826955	1998 SK_{179}	—	October 27, 2009	Mount Lemmon	Mount Lemmon Survey	·	790 m	MPC · JPL
826956	1998 SP_{179}	—	September 23, 2008	Mount Lemmon	Mount Lemmon Survey	·	550 m	MPC · JPL
826957	1998 SD_{180}	—	August 18, 2009	Kitt Peak	Spacewatch	·	2.2 km	MPC · JPL
826958	1998 ST_{180}	—	April 10, 2013	Haleakala	Pan-STARRS 1	·	950 m	MPC · JPL
826959	1998 SW_{180}	—	April 2, 2016	Haleakala	Pan-STARRS 1	·	570 m	MPC · JPL
826960	1998 SG_{182}	—	September 19, 1998	Sacramento Peak	SDSS	KOR	1.2 km	MPC · JPL
826961	1998 UN_{51}	—	March 6, 2011	Mount Lemmon	Mount Lemmon Survey	·	1.0 km	MPC · JPL
826962	1998 US_{51}	—	October 27, 1998	Kitt Peak	Spacewatch	·	1.5 km	MPC · JPL
826963	1998 UW_{51}	—	October 19, 1998	Kitt Peak	Spacewatch	NYS	620 m	MPC · JPL
826964	1998 WT_{44}	—	November 18, 1998	Roque de los Muchachos	A. Fitzsimmons	EUN	1.3 km	MPC · JPL
826965	1998 WV_{44}	—	November 18, 1998	Roque de los Muchachos	A. Fitzsimmons	·	1.7 km	MPC · JPL
826966	1998 WA_{45}	—	November 18, 1998	Roque de los Muchachos	A. Fitzsimmons	·	1.7 km	MPC · JPL
826967	1999 AS_{28}	—	January 13, 1999	Kitt Peak	Spacewatch	·	1.5 km	MPC · JPL
826968	1999 CU_{156}	—	February 8, 1999	Kitt Peak	Spacewatch	·	3.2 km	MPC · JPL
826969	1999 CP_{160}	—	March 12, 2010	Mount Lemmon	Mount Lemmon Survey	·	2.8 km	MPC · JPL
826970	1999 FN_{63}	—	March 20, 1999	Sacramento Peak	SDSS	·	1.1 km	MPC · JPL
826971	1999 FP_{63}	—	March 20, 1999	Sacramento Peak	SDSS	·	1.1 km	MPC · JPL
826972	1999 FV_{63}	—	March 20, 1999	Sacramento Peak	SDSS	·	1.7 km	MPC · JPL
826973	1999 FA_{65}	—	March 20, 1999	Sacramento Peak	SDSS	·	1.8 km	MPC · JPL
826974	1999 FC_{65}	—	March 20, 1999	Sacramento Peak	SDSS	·	810 m	MPC · JPL
826975	1999 FD_{65}	—	March 20, 1999	Sacramento Peak	SDSS	·	1.5 km	MPC · JPL
826976	1999 FK_{65}	—	March 20, 1999	Sacramento Peak	SDSS	·	2.3 km	MPC · JPL
826977	1999 FL_{65}	—	March 20, 1999	Sacramento Peak	SDSS	·	990 m	MPC · JPL
826978	1999 FP_{66}	—	March 20, 1999	Sacramento Peak	SDSS	·	1.5 km	MPC · JPL
826979	1999 FU_{66}	—	March 20, 1999	Sacramento Peak	SDSS	·	1.6 km	MPC · JPL
826980	1999 FW_{66}	—	March 20, 1999	Sacramento Peak	SDSS	·	1.3 km	MPC · JPL
826981	1999 FG_{67}	—	March 20, 1999	Sacramento Peak	SDSS	·	1 km	MPC · JPL
826982	1999 FP_{67}	—	March 20, 1999	Sacramento Peak	SDSS	·	700 m	MPC · JPL
826983	1999 FT_{67}	—	March 20, 1999	Sacramento Peak	SDSS	TIN	1.1 km	MPC · JPL
826984	1999 FU_{67}	—	March 20, 1999	Sacramento Peak	SDSS	·	2.3 km	MPC · JPL
826985	1999 FX_{68}	—	March 20, 1999	Sacramento Peak	SDSS	·	900 m	MPC · JPL
826986	1999 FA_{69}	—	March 10, 1999	Kitt Peak	Spacewatch	·	1.1 km	MPC · JPL
826987	1999 FL_{69}	—	March 20, 1999	Sacramento Peak	SDSS	V	460 m	MPC · JPL
826988	1999 FO_{69}	—	March 20, 1999	Sacramento Peak	SDSS	·	1.1 km	MPC · JPL
826989	1999 FP_{69}	—	March 20, 1999	Sacramento Peak	SDSS	MAS	740 m	MPC · JPL
826990	1999 FS_{70}	—	March 20, 1999	Sacramento Peak	SDSS	·	1.9 km	MPC · JPL
826991	1999 FW_{70}	—	March 20, 1999	Sacramento Peak	SDSS	EUN	750 m	MPC · JPL
826992	1999 FS_{71}	—	March 20, 1999	Sacramento Peak	SDSS	·	2.3 km	MPC · JPL
826993	1999 FA_{72}	—	March 20, 1999	Sacramento Peak	SDSS	·	1.3 km	MPC · JPL
826994	1999 FP_{72}	—	March 20, 1999	Sacramento Peak	SDSS	·	1.6 km	MPC · JPL
826995	1999 FU_{72}	—	March 20, 1999	Sacramento Peak	SDSS	·	1.7 km	MPC · JPL
826996	1999 FT_{73}	—	March 20, 1999	Sacramento Peak	SDSS	VER	2.3 km	MPC · JPL
826997	1999 FL_{74}	—	March 20, 1999	Sacramento Peak	SDSS	·	1.7 km	MPC · JPL
826998	1999 FQ_{74}	—	March 20, 1999	Sacramento Peak	SDSS	NYS	900 m	MPC · JPL
826999	1999 FT_{75}	—	March 20, 1999	Sacramento Peak	SDSS	·	2.2 km	MPC · JPL
827000	1999 FW_{75}	—	March 20, 1999	Sacramento Peak	SDSS	(5)	1.2 km	MPC · JPL

back to top

== Meaning of names ==
As minor planet discoveries are confirmed, they are given a permanent number by the IAU's Minor Planet Center (MPC), and the discoverers can then submit names for them, following the IAU's naming conventions. The list below concerns those minor planets in the specified number-range that have received names, and explains the meanings of those names.

Official naming citations of newly named small Solar System bodies are approved and published in a bulletin by IAU's Working Group for Small Bodies Nomenclature (WGSBN). Before May 2021, citations were published in MPC's Minor Planet Circulars for many decades. Recent citations can also be found on the JPL Small-Body Database (SBDB). Until his death in 2016, German astronomer Lutz D. Schmadel compiled these citations into the Dictionary of Minor Planet Names (DMP) and regularly updated the collection.

Based on Paul Herget's The Names of the Minor Planets, Schmadel also researched the unclear origin of numerous asteroids, most of which had been named prior to World War II. This article incorporates text from this source, which is in the public domain: SBDB New namings may only be added to this list below after official publication as the preannouncement of names is condemned. The WGSBN publishes a comprehensive guideline for the naming rules of non-cometary small Solar System bodies.

Named minor planet	Provisional	This minor planet was named for...	Ref · Catalog
826505 Xujianlin	2020 TO_{62}	Xu Jianlin, Chinese amateur astronomer in Suzhou, Jiangsu.	IAU · 826505
826631 Frascati	2021 JR_{30}	Frascati is a picturesque city near Rome, Italy.	IAU · 826631
826856 Commodorecochran	2025 BN_{9}	Commodore Shelton Cochran, Olympic gold medal winner.	IAU · 826856
826870 Iancooper	1991 PN	Ian Cooper, American amateur astronomer.	IAU · 826870
826930 Charlottesmall	1997 RN_{7}	As a young Canadian Metis woman, Charlotte Small (1785–1857) married cartographer and explorer David Thompson, and together they established fur trading routes across northwestern North America. They traveled some 45000 kilometers in their lifelong quest, even as Small birthed their 13 children on their journeys.	IAU · 826930
