= List of minor planets: 30001–31000 =

The following is a partial list of minor planets, running from minor-planet number 30001 through 31000, inclusive. The primary data for this and other partial lists is based on JPL's "Small-Body Orbital Elements" and data available from the Minor Planet Center. Critical list information is also provided by the MPC, unless otherwise specified from Lowell Observatory. A detailed description of the table's columns and additional sources are given on the main page including a complete list of every page in this series, and a statistical break-up on the dynamical classification of minor planets.

Also see the summary list of all named bodies in numerical and alphabetical order, and the corresponding naming citations for the number range of this particular list. New namings may only be added to this list after official publication, as the preannouncement of names is condemned by the Working Group for Small Bodies Nomenclature of the International Astronomical Union.

Near-Earth obj.	MBA (inner)	MBA (outer)	Centaur
Mars-crosser	MBA (middle)	Jupiter trojan	Trans-Neptunian obj.
Unclassified

== 30001–30100 ==
Designation			Discovery			Properties		Ref
Permanent	Provisional	Named after	Date	Site	Discoverer(s)	Category	Diam.	Ref
30001	2000 AU_{195}	—	January 8, 2000	Socorro	LINEAR	EUN	5.6 km	MPC · JPL
30002	2000 AP_{233}	—	January 4, 2000	Kitt Peak	Spacewatch	·	1.6 km	MPC · JPL
30003	2000 AO_{236}	—	January 5, 2000	Socorro	LINEAR	·	4.4 km	MPC · JPL
30004 Mikewilliams	2000 BP_{33}	Mikewilliams	January 30, 2000	Catalina	CSS	NYS	2.8 km	MPC · JPL
30005 Stevenchen	2000 CJ_{23}	Stevenchen	February 2, 2000	Socorro	LINEAR	·	2.3 km	MPC · JPL
30006	2000 CB_{30}	—	February 2, 2000	Socorro	LINEAR	KOR	6.2 km	MPC · JPL
30007 Johnclarke	2000 CV_{45}	Johnclarke	February 2, 2000	Socorro	LINEAR	·	4.1 km	MPC · JPL
30008 Aroncoraor	2000 CE_{49}	Aroncoraor	February 2, 2000	Socorro	LINEAR	NYS	3.3 km	MPC · JPL
30009	2000 CQ_{50}	—	February 2, 2000	Socorro	LINEAR	·	4.1 km	MPC · JPL
30010	2000 CJ_{56}	—	February 4, 2000	Socorro	LINEAR	·	5.9 km	MPC · JPL
30011	2000 CM_{56}	—	February 4, 2000	Socorro	LINEAR	·	2.1 km	MPC · JPL
30012 Sohamdaga	2000 CB_{67}	Sohamdaga	February 6, 2000	Socorro	LINEAR	·	3.4 km	MPC · JPL
30013	2000 CV_{77}	—	February 7, 2000	Kitt Peak	Spacewatch	·	2.7 km	MPC · JPL
30014	2000 CY_{80}	—	February 11, 2000	Oaxaca	Roe, J. M.	·	1.9 km	MPC · JPL
30015	2000 CX_{92}	—	February 6, 2000	Socorro	LINEAR	·	2.0 km	MPC · JPL
30016	2000 CA_{95}	—	February 8, 2000	Socorro	LINEAR	NYS	8.1 km	MPC · JPL
30017 Shaundatta	2000 CQ_{95}	Shaundatta	February 10, 2000	Socorro	LINEAR	·	3.6 km	MPC · JPL
30018 Loemele	2000 CX_{101}	Loemele	February 14, 2000	Uccle	T. Pauwels	·	4.4 km	MPC · JPL
30019	2000 DD	—	February 16, 2000	Socorro	LINEAR	H	2.4 km	MPC · JPL
30020	2000 DZ_{5}	—	February 28, 2000	Socorro	LINEAR	L4	22 km	MPC · JPL
30021	2000 DP_{6}	—	February 28, 2000	Socorro	LINEAR	·	2.2 km	MPC · JPL
30022 Kathibaker	2000 DZ_{14}	Kathibaker	February 26, 2000	Catalina	CSS	NYS ·	4.2 km	MPC · JPL
30023	2000 DN_{16}	—	February 29, 2000	Višnjan Observatory	K. Korlević	NYS	2.9 km	MPC · JPL
30024 Neildavey	2000 DM_{21}	Neildavey	February 29, 2000	Socorro	LINEAR	·	4.4 km	MPC · JPL
30025 Benfreed	2000 DJ_{26}	Benfreed	February 29, 2000	Socorro	LINEAR	(2076)	2.1 km	MPC · JPL
30026	2000 DS_{29}	—	February 29, 2000	Višnjan Observatory	K. Korlević	·	4.6 km	MPC · JPL
30027 Anubhavguha	2000 DA_{42}	Anubhavguha	February 29, 2000	Socorro	LINEAR	·	2.2 km	MPC · JPL
30028 Yushihomma	2000 DL_{42}	Yushihomma	February 29, 2000	Socorro	LINEAR	MAS	2.6 km	MPC · JPL
30029 Preetikakani	2000 DR_{58}	Preetikakani	February 29, 2000	Socorro	LINEAR	ERI	3.9 km	MPC · JPL
30030 Joycekang	2000 DY_{61}	Joycekang	February 29, 2000	Socorro	LINEAR	NYS	2.3 km	MPC · JPL
30031 Angelakong	2000 DZ_{63}	Angelakong	February 29, 2000	Socorro	LINEAR	·	3.6 km	MPC · JPL
30032 Kuszmaul	2000 DC_{65}	Kuszmaul	February 29, 2000	Socorro	LINEAR	MAS	1.4 km	MPC · JPL
30033 Kevinlee	2000 DP_{68}	Kevinlee	February 29, 2000	Socorro	LINEAR	·	1.6 km	MPC · JPL
30034	2000 DU_{76}	—	February 29, 2000	Socorro	LINEAR	·	1.6 km	MPC · JPL
30035 Charlesliu	2000 DX_{77}	Charlesliu	February 29, 2000	Socorro	LINEAR	·	2.7 km	MPC · JPL
30036 Eshamaiti	2000 DF_{78}	Eshamaiti	February 29, 2000	Socorro	LINEAR	NYS	2.6 km	MPC · JPL
30037 Rahulmehta	2000 DU_{78}	Rahulmehta	February 29, 2000	Socorro	LINEAR	·	2.3 km	MPC · JPL
30038	2000 DM_{92}	—	February 27, 2000	Kitt Peak	Spacewatch	·	2.0 km	MPC · JPL
30039 Jameier	2000 DE_{100}	Jameier	February 29, 2000	Socorro	LINEAR	NYS ·	3.1 km	MPC · JPL
30040 Annemerrill	2000 DO_{112}	Annemerrill	February 29, 2000	Socorro	LINEAR	·	5.3 km	MPC · JPL
30041	2000 EG_{3}	—	March 3, 2000	Socorro	LINEAR	·	3.2 km	MPC · JPL
30042 Schmude	2000 EY_{3}	Schmude	March 1, 2000	Catalina	CSS	·	3.3 km	MPC · JPL
30043 Lisamichaels	2000 EJ_{17}	Lisamichaels	March 3, 2000	Socorro	LINEAR	·	3.4 km	MPC · JPL
30044	2000 EG_{19}	—	March 5, 2000	Socorro	LINEAR	·	1.7 km	MPC · JPL
30045	2000 EC_{20}	—	March 6, 2000	Višnjan Observatory	K. Korlević	NYS	2.8 km	MPC · JPL
30046	2000 EX_{24}	—	March 8, 2000	Kitt Peak	Spacewatch	·	3.0 km	MPC · JPL
30047	2000 EV_{35}	—	March 8, 2000	Socorro	LINEAR	ADE	9.9 km	MPC · JPL
30048 Sreyasmisra	2000 EB_{37}	Sreyasmisra	March 8, 2000	Socorro	LINEAR	·	3.0 km	MPC · JPL
30049 Violamocz	2000 EX_{38}	Violamocz	March 8, 2000	Socorro	LINEAR	·	7.1 km	MPC · JPL
30050 Emilypang	2000 EK_{39}	Emilypang	March 8, 2000	Socorro	LINEAR	·	2.7 km	MPC · JPL
30051 Jihopark	2000 ED_{41}	Jihopark	March 8, 2000	Socorro	LINEAR	·	6.6 km	MPC · JPL
30052	2000 EW_{41}	—	March 8, 2000	Socorro	LINEAR	·	6.2 km	MPC · JPL
30053 Ivanpaskov	2000 EG_{44}	Ivanpaskov	March 9, 2000	Socorro	LINEAR	·	1.5 km	MPC · JPL
30054 Pereira	2000 EO_{44}	Pereira	March 9, 2000	Socorro	LINEAR	·	2.3 km	MPC · JPL
30055 Ajaysaini	2000 EL_{47}	Ajaysaini	March 9, 2000	Socorro	LINEAR	NYS	2.9 km	MPC · JPL
30056	2000 EP_{47}	—	March 9, 2000	Socorro	LINEAR	·	2.5 km	MPC · JPL
30057 Sarasakowitz	2000 EK_{56}	Sarasakowitz	March 8, 2000	Socorro	LINEAR	NYS	3.7 km	MPC · JPL
30058	2000 EJ_{58}	—	March 8, 2000	Socorro	LINEAR	·	7.0 km	MPC · JPL
30059	2000 ET_{59}	—	March 10, 2000	Socorro	LINEAR	·	1.3 km	MPC · JPL
30060 Davidseong	2000 EL_{60}	Davidseong	March 10, 2000	Socorro	LINEAR	NYS	2.3 km	MPC · JPL
30061 Vishnushankar	2000 EX_{61}	Vishnushankar	March 10, 2000	Socorro	LINEAR	·	3.4 km	MPC · JPL
30062	2000 ER_{62}	—	March 10, 2000	Socorro	LINEAR	·	5.3 km	MPC · JPL
30063 Jessicashi	2000 EX_{63}	Jessicashi	March 10, 2000	Socorro	LINEAR	·	1.8 km	MPC · JPL
30064 Kaitlynshin	2000 ER_{64}	Kaitlynshin	March 10, 2000	Socorro	LINEAR	·	2.4 km	MPC · JPL
30065 Asrinivasan	2000 EF_{66}	Asrinivasan	March 10, 2000	Socorro	LINEAR	·	2.9 km	MPC · JPL
30066 Parthakker	2000 EV_{68}	Parthakker	March 10, 2000	Socorro	LINEAR	·	2.9 km	MPC · JPL
30067 Natalieng	2000 EL_{70}	Natalieng	March 10, 2000	Socorro	LINEAR	·	2.8 km	MPC · JPL
30068 Frankmelillo	2000 EZ_{70}	Frankmelillo	March 11, 2000	Catalina	CSS	GEF	4.3 km	MPC · JPL
30069	2000 EH_{74}	—	March 10, 2000	Kitt Peak	Spacewatch	V	1.3 km	MPC · JPL
30070 Thabitpulak	2000 ES_{84}	Thabitpulak	March 8, 2000	Socorro	LINEAR	·	1.8 km	MPC · JPL
30071	2000 EW_{92}	—	March 9, 2000	Socorro	LINEAR	·	4.0 km	MPC · JPL
30072	2000 EP_{93}	—	March 9, 2000	Socorro	LINEAR	EUN	6.1 km	MPC · JPL
30073 Erichen	2000 EP_{94}	Erichen	March 9, 2000	Socorro	LINEAR	(2076)	3.6 km	MPC · JPL
30074	2000 EY_{96}	—	March 10, 2000	Socorro	LINEAR	·	9.5 km	MPC · JPL
30075	2000 EC_{97}	—	March 10, 2000	Socorro	LINEAR	EUN	4.2 km	MPC · JPL
30076	2000 EP_{97}	—	March 10, 2000	Socorro	LINEAR	·	7.5 km	MPC · JPL
30077	2000 ES_{97}	—	March 10, 2000	Socorro	LINEAR	·	6.2 km	MPC · JPL
30078	2000 EB_{104}	—	March 14, 2000	Socorro	LINEAR	·	8.5 km	MPC · JPL
30079	2000 EP_{104}	—	March 15, 2000	Reedy Creek	J. Broughton	·	3.7 km	MPC · JPL
30080 Walterworman	2000 EQ_{105}	Walterworman	March 11, 2000	Anderson Mesa	LONEOS	EUN	2.9 km	MPC · JPL
30081 Zarinrahman	2000 EY_{108}	Zarinrahman	March 8, 2000	Socorro	LINEAR	·	3.1 km	MPC · JPL
30082	2000 EE_{110}	—	March 8, 2000	Haleakala	NEAT	·	3.7 km	MPC · JPL
30083	2000 EG_{110}	—	March 8, 2000	Haleakala	NEAT	V	2.7 km	MPC · JPL
30084	2000 EV_{110}	—	March 8, 2000	Haleakala	NEAT	·	2.9 km	MPC · JPL
30085 Kevingarbe	2000 EZ_{112}	Kevingarbe	March 9, 2000	Socorro	LINEAR	·	2.0 km	MPC · JPL
30086	2000 EU_{113}	—	March 9, 2000	Socorro	LINEAR	PHO	4.1 km	MPC · JPL
30087 Georgeputnam	2000 EL_{122}	Georgeputnam	March 11, 2000	Anderson Mesa	LONEOS	slow	1.8 km	MPC · JPL
30088 Deprá	2000 EK_{128}	Deprá	March 11, 2000	Anderson Mesa	LONEOS	NYS	7.2 km	MPC · JPL
30089 Terikelley	2000 EW_{128}	Terikelley	March 11, 2000	Anderson Mesa	LONEOS	·	3.7 km	MPC · JPL
30090 Grossano	2000 EL_{129}	Grossano	March 11, 2000	Anderson Mesa	LONEOS	·	5.4 km	MPC · JPL
30091 Stephenbrown	2000 EY_{130}	Stephenbrown	March 11, 2000	Anderson Mesa	LONEOS	·	1.9 km	MPC · JPL
30092 Menke	2000 EB_{135}	Menke	March 11, 2000	Anderson Mesa	LONEOS	NYS ·	5.7 km	MPC · JPL
30093 McClanahan	2000 ES_{135}	McClanahan	March 11, 2000	Anderson Mesa	LONEOS	JUN	4.3 km	MPC · JPL
30094 Rolfebode	2000 ER_{141}	Rolfebode	March 2, 2000	Catalina	CSS	·	3.4 km	MPC · JPL
30095 Tarabode	2000 EU_{145}	Tarabode	March 3, 2000	Catalina	CSS	·	2.8 km	MPC · JPL
30096 Glindadavidson	2000 EZ_{147}	Glindadavidson	March 4, 2000	Catalina	CSS	NYS	3.4 km	MPC · JPL
30097 Traino	2000 EQ_{148}	Traino	March 4, 2000	Catalina	CSS	·	4.2 km	MPC · JPL
30098	2000 EE_{151}	—	March 5, 2000	Haleakala	NEAT	NYS	3.3 km	MPC · JPL
30099	2000 EG_{151}	—	March 5, 2000	Haleakala	NEAT	·	8.5 km	MPC · JPL
30100 Christophergo	2000 EL_{157}	Christophergo	March 11, 2000	Catalina	CSS	·	4.4 km	MPC · JPL

== 30101–30200 ==
back to top

Designation			Discovery			Properties		Ref
Permanent	Provisional	Named after	Date	Site	Discoverer(s)	Category	Diam.	Ref
30101	2000 FA	—	March 16, 2000	Socorro	LINEAR	·	2.8 km	MPC · JPL
30102	2000 FC_{1}	—	March 26, 2000	Socorro	LINEAR	L4	36 km	MPC · JPL
30103	2000 FY_{2}	—	March 28, 2000	Oaxaca	Roe, J. M.	NYS ·	3.8 km	MPC · JPL
30104	2000 FA_{3}	—	March 27, 2000	Gekko	T. Kagawa	·	2.5 km	MPC · JPL
30105	2000 FO_{3}	—	March 28, 2000	Socorro	LINEAR	·	3.7 km	MPC · JPL
30106	2000 FR_{3}	—	March 28, 2000	Socorro	LINEAR	·	5.6 km	MPC · JPL
30107	2000 FT_{15}	—	March 28, 2000	Socorro	LINEAR	V	2.1 km	MPC · JPL
30108	2000 FM_{16}	—	March 28, 2000	Socorro	LINEAR	·	4.5 km	MPC · JPL
30109 Jaywilson	2000 FQ_{17}	Jaywilson	March 29, 2000	Socorro	LINEAR	·	2.4 km	MPC · JPL
30110 Lisabreton	2000 FH_{20}	Lisabreton	March 29, 2000	Socorro	LINEAR	·	5.0 km	MPC · JPL
30111 Wendyslijk	2000 FJ_{20}	Wendyslijk	March 29, 2000	Socorro	LINEAR	V	2.1 km	MPC · JPL
30112 Weistrop	2000 FZ_{25}	Weistrop	March 27, 2000	Anderson Mesa	LONEOS	V	4.5 km	MPC · JPL
30113 Kylerkuehn	2000 FM_{26}	Kylerkuehn	March 27, 2000	Anderson Mesa	LONEOS	·	2.8 km	MPC · JPL
30114 Mooney	2000 FY_{26}	Mooney	March 27, 2000	Anderson Mesa	LONEOS	·	1.8 km	MPC · JPL
30115	2000 FQ_{31}	—	March 28, 2000	Socorro	LINEAR	PHO	5.7 km	MPC · JPL
30116	2000 FA_{36}	—	March 29, 2000	Socorro	LINEAR	PHO	6.7 km	MPC · JPL
30117 Childress	2000 FW_{36}	Childress	March 29, 2000	Socorro	LINEAR	·	2.6 km	MPC · JPL
30118	2000 FC_{37}	—	March 29, 2000	Socorro	LINEAR	·	2.6 km	MPC · JPL
30119 Lucamatone	2000 FS_{37}	Lucamatone	March 29, 2000	Socorro	LINEAR	·	3.5 km	MPC · JPL
30120	2000 FZ_{38}	—	March 29, 2000	Socorro	LINEAR	ERI	7.0 km	MPC · JPL
30121	2000 FF_{39}	—	March 29, 2000	Socorro	LINEAR	·	2.0 km	MPC · JPL
30122 Elschweitzer	2000 FC_{40}	Elschweitzer	March 29, 2000	Socorro	LINEAR	·	3.2 km	MPC · JPL
30123 Scottrippeon	2000 FF_{40}	Scottrippeon	March 29, 2000	Socorro	LINEAR	·	2.6 km	MPC · JPL
30124	2000 FZ_{40}	—	March 29, 2000	Socorro	LINEAR	·	3.2 km	MPC · JPL
30125 Mikekiser	2000 FF_{41}	Mikekiser	March 29, 2000	Socorro	LINEAR	·	3.1 km	MPC · JPL
30126 Haviland	2000 FS_{41}	Haviland	March 29, 2000	Socorro	LINEAR	·	2.1 km	MPC · JPL
30127	2000 FY_{41}	—	March 29, 2000	Socorro	LINEAR	·	2.2 km	MPC · JPL
30128 Shannonbunch	2000 FJ_{44}	Shannonbunch	March 29, 2000	Socorro	LINEAR	·	2.9 km	MPC · JPL
30129 Virmani	2000 FT_{44}	Virmani	March 29, 2000	Socorro	LINEAR	·	1.8 km	MPC · JPL
30130 Jeandillman	2000 FK_{46}	Jeandillman	March 29, 2000	Socorro	LINEAR	·	2.4 km	MPC · JPL
30131	2000 FO_{46}	—	March 29, 2000	Socorro	LINEAR	·	2.1 km	MPC · JPL
30132	2000 FP_{47}	—	March 29, 2000	Socorro	LINEAR	·	9.2 km	MPC · JPL
30133	2000 FA_{48}	—	March 29, 2000	Socorro	LINEAR	·	3.0 km	MPC · JPL
30134	2000 FR_{49}	—	March 30, 2000	Socorro	LINEAR	MAR	3.7 km	MPC · JPL
30135	2000 FU_{49}	—	March 30, 2000	Socorro	LINEAR	EUN	4.5 km	MPC · JPL
30136 Bakerfranke	2000 FO_{60}	Bakerfranke	March 29, 2000	Socorro	LINEAR	·	3.2 km	MPC · JPL
30137 Sherryshaffer	2000 FB_{63}	Sherryshaffer	March 27, 2000	Anderson Mesa	LONEOS	·	2.3 km	MPC · JPL
30138 Gonyea	2000 FN_{68}	Gonyea	March 26, 2000	Anderson Mesa	LONEOS	·	1.2 km	MPC · JPL
30139	2000 GG_{3}	—	April 5, 2000	Socorro	LINEAR	PHO	2.9 km	MPC · JPL
30140 Robpergolizzi	2000 GO_{5}	Robpergolizzi	April 4, 2000	Socorro	LINEAR	·	2.9 km	MPC · JPL
30141 Nelvenzon	2000 GT_{24}	Nelvenzon	April 5, 2000	Socorro	LINEAR	·	2.9 km	MPC · JPL
30142 Debfrazier	2000 GS_{26}	Debfrazier	April 5, 2000	Socorro	LINEAR	·	2.7 km	MPC · JPL
30143	2000 GU_{29}	—	April 5, 2000	Socorro	LINEAR	EUN	4.0 km	MPC · JPL
30144 Minubasu	2000 GP_{31}	Minubasu	April 5, 2000	Socorro	LINEAR	·	1.9 km	MPC · JPL
30145	2000 GG_{33}	—	April 5, 2000	Socorro	LINEAR	·	5.7 km	MPC · JPL
30146 Decandia	2000 GQ_{34}	Decandia	April 5, 2000	Socorro	LINEAR	THM	8.4 km	MPC · JPL
30147 Amyhammer	2000 GV_{41}	Amyhammer	April 5, 2000	Socorro	LINEAR	·	3.0 km	MPC · JPL
30148	2000 GP_{45}	—	April 5, 2000	Socorro	LINEAR	·	3.4 km	MPC · JPL
30149 Kellyriedell	2000 GW_{45}	Kellyriedell	April 5, 2000	Socorro	LINEAR	·	2.0 km	MPC · JPL
30150 Laseminara	2000 GC_{46}	Laseminara	April 5, 2000	Socorro	LINEAR	V	2.6 km	MPC · JPL
30151 Susanoffner	2000 GX_{46}	Susanoffner	April 5, 2000	Socorro	LINEAR	V	2.0 km	MPC · JPL
30152 Reneefallon	2000 GW_{49}	Reneefallon	April 5, 2000	Socorro	LINEAR	NYS	6.0 km	MPC · JPL
30153 Ostrander	2000 GT_{50}	Ostrander	April 5, 2000	Socorro	LINEAR	·	1.8 km	MPC · JPL
30154 Christichil	2000 GO_{52}	Christichil	April 5, 2000	Socorro	LINEAR	·	4.8 km	MPC · JPL
30155 Warmuth	2000 GQ_{52}	Warmuth	April 5, 2000	Socorro	LINEAR	·	2.2 km	MPC · JPL
30156	2000 GH_{55}	—	April 5, 2000	Socorro	LINEAR	·	2.0 km	MPC · JPL
30157 Robertspira	2000 GL_{55}	Robertspira	April 5, 2000	Socorro	LINEAR	NYS	2.9 km	MPC · JPL
30158 Mabdulla	2000 GQ_{55}	Mabdulla	April 5, 2000	Socorro	LINEAR	·	5.4 km	MPC · JPL
30159 Behari	2000 GR_{55}	Behari	April 5, 2000	Socorro	LINEAR	·	2.4 km	MPC · JPL
30160 Danielbruce	2000 GD_{57}	Danielbruce	April 5, 2000	Socorro	LINEAR	·	2.9 km	MPC · JPL
30161 Chrepta	2000 GM_{57}	Chrepta	April 5, 2000	Socorro	LINEAR	·	2.4 km	MPC · JPL
30162 Courtney	2000 GO_{57}	Courtney	April 5, 2000	Socorro	LINEAR	MAS	2.7 km	MPC · JPL
30163	2000 GK_{58}	—	April 5, 2000	Socorro	LINEAR	GEF	4.1 km	MPC · JPL
30164 Arnobdas	2000 GC_{59}	Arnobdas	April 5, 2000	Socorro	LINEAR	·	5.2 km	MPC · JPL
30165	2000 GF_{61}	—	April 5, 2000	Socorro	LINEAR	·	6.0 km	MPC · JPL
30166 Leodeng	2000 GC_{62}	Leodeng	April 5, 2000	Socorro	LINEAR	·	4.8 km	MPC · JPL
30167 Caredmonds	2000 GR_{62}	Caredmonds	April 5, 2000	Socorro	LINEAR	·	3.7 km	MPC · JPL
30168 Linusfreyer	2000 GG_{66}	Linusfreyer	April 5, 2000	Socorro	LINEAR	NYS	3.9 km	MPC · JPL
30169 Raghavganesh	2000 GU_{67}	Raghavganesh	April 5, 2000	Socorro	LINEAR	·	2.0 km	MPC · JPL
30170 Makaylaruth	2000 GG_{68}	Makaylaruth	April 5, 2000	Socorro	LINEAR	·	2.4 km	MPC · JPL
30171	2000 GY_{70}	—	April 5, 2000	Socorro	LINEAR	V	2.9 km	MPC · JPL
30172 Giedraitis	2000 GZ_{71}	Giedraitis	April 5, 2000	Socorro	LINEAR	KOR	3.7 km	MPC · JPL
30173 Greenwood	2000 GG_{72}	Greenwood	April 5, 2000	Socorro	LINEAR	·	2.8 km	MPC · JPL
30174 Hollyjackson	2000 GY_{72}	Hollyjackson	April 5, 2000	Socorro	LINEAR	·	2.2 km	MPC · JPL
30175 Adityajain	2000 GS_{73}	Adityajain	April 5, 2000	Socorro	LINEAR	·	3.7 km	MPC · JPL
30176 Gelseyjaymes	2000 GX_{73}	Gelseyjaymes	April 5, 2000	Socorro	LINEAR	·	3.1 km	MPC · JPL
30177 Khashayar	2000 GV_{76}	Khashayar	April 5, 2000	Socorro	LINEAR	V	2.7 km	MPC · JPL
30178	2000 GW_{77}	—	April 5, 2000	Socorro	LINEAR	·	3.1 km	MPC · JPL
30179 Movva	2000 GY_{79}	Movva	April 6, 2000	Socorro	LINEAR	·	3.7 km	MPC · JPL
30180	2000 GX_{87}	—	April 4, 2000	Socorro	LINEAR	·	5.4 km	MPC · JPL
30181	2000 GR_{88}	—	April 4, 2000	Socorro	LINEAR	·	4.0 km	MPC · JPL
30182	2000 GC_{95}	—	April 6, 2000	Socorro	LINEAR	EUN	5.1 km	MPC · JPL
30183 Murali	2000 GL_{95}	Murali	April 6, 2000	Socorro	LINEAR	slow	5.3 km	MPC · JPL
30184 Okasinski	2000 GM_{95}	Okasinski	April 6, 2000	Socorro	LINEAR	V	2.1 km	MPC · JPL
30185	2000 GT_{95}	—	April 6, 2000	Socorro	LINEAR	·	7.4 km	MPC · JPL
30186 Ostojic	2000 GY_{95}	Ostojic	April 6, 2000	Socorro	LINEAR	·	5.1 km	MPC · JPL
30187 Jamesroney	2000 GN_{96}	Jamesroney	April 6, 2000	Socorro	LINEAR	·	3.5 km	MPC · JPL
30188 Hafsasaeed	2000 GR_{96}	Hafsasaeed	April 6, 2000	Socorro	LINEAR	·	3.0 km	MPC · JPL
30189	2000 GV_{96}	—	April 6, 2000	Socorro	LINEAR	·	7.1 km	MPC · JPL
30190 Alexshelby	2000 GW_{96}	Alexshelby	April 6, 2000	Socorro	LINEAR	·	6.3 km	MPC · JPL
30191 Sivakumar	2000 GJ_{98}	Sivakumar	April 7, 2000	Socorro	LINEAR	·	4.3 km	MPC · JPL
30192 Talarterzian	2000 GB_{100}	Talarterzian	April 7, 2000	Socorro	LINEAR	BAP	3.0 km	MPC · JPL
30193 Annikaurban	2000 GL_{100}	Annikaurban	April 7, 2000	Socorro	LINEAR	·	2.3 km	MPC · JPL
30194 Liamyoung	2000 GM_{100}	Liamyoung	April 7, 2000	Socorro	LINEAR	·	3.1 km	MPC · JPL
30195 Akdemir	2000 GB_{101}	Akdemir	April 7, 2000	Socorro	LINEAR	·	3.7 km	MPC · JPL
30196	2000 GB_{102}	—	April 7, 2000	Socorro	LINEAR	·	2.2 km	MPC · JPL
30197 Nickbadyrka	2000 GP_{102}	Nickbadyrka	April 7, 2000	Socorro	LINEAR	·	2.1 km	MPC · JPL
30198	2000 GR_{103}	—	April 7, 2000	Socorro	LINEAR	·	1.9 km	MPC · JPL
30199 Ericbrown	2000 GX_{103}	Ericbrown	April 7, 2000	Socorro	LINEAR	·	1.7 km	MPC · JPL
30200 Terryburch	2000 GG_{104}	Terryburch	April 7, 2000	Socorro	LINEAR	NYS	2.5 km	MPC · JPL

== 30201–30300 ==
back to top

Designation			Discovery			Properties		Ref
Permanent	Provisional	Named after	Date	Site	Discoverer(s)	Category	Diam.	Ref
30201 Caruana	2000 GA_{105}	Caruana	April 7, 2000	Socorro	LINEAR	·	3.5 km	MPC · JPL
30202	2000 GD_{105}	—	April 7, 2000	Socorro	LINEAR	·	3.0 km	MPC · JPL
30203 Kimdavis	2000 GK_{106}	Kimdavis	April 7, 2000	Socorro	LINEAR	NYS	3.6 km	MPC · JPL
30204 Stevedoherty	2000 GX_{107}	Stevedoherty	April 7, 2000	Socorro	LINEAR	·	4.3 km	MPC · JPL
30205 Mistyevans	2000 GV_{108}	Mistyevans	April 7, 2000	Socorro	LINEAR	·	2.2 km	MPC · JPL
30206 Jasonfricker	2000 GD_{109}	Jasonfricker	April 7, 2000	Socorro	LINEAR	·	3.1 km	MPC · JPL
30207	2000 GL_{109}	—	April 7, 2000	Socorro	LINEAR	·	5.0 km	MPC · JPL
30208 Guigarcia	2000 GN_{115}	Guigarcia	April 8, 2000	Socorro	LINEAR	V	1.9 km	MPC · JPL
30209 Garciaarriola	2000 GG_{116}	Garciaarriola	April 8, 2000	Socorro	LINEAR	·	3.8 km	MPC · JPL
30210	2000 GN_{122}	—	April 10, 2000	Haleakala	NEAT	·	3.9 km	MPC · JPL
30211 Sheilah	2000 GN_{123}	Sheilah	April 7, 2000	Socorro	LINEAR	·	3.3 km	MPC · JPL
30212	2000 GP_{123}	—	April 7, 2000	Socorro	LINEAR	·	4.5 km	MPC · JPL
30213	2000 GW_{124}	—	April 7, 2000	Socorro	LINEAR	·	3.9 km	MPC · JPL
30214	2000 GS_{125}	—	April 7, 2000	Socorro	LINEAR	V	3.2 km	MPC · JPL
30215	2000 GU_{125}	—	April 7, 2000	Socorro	LINEAR	·	4.7 km	MPC · JPL
30216 Summerjohnson	2000 GV_{125}	Summerjohnson	April 7, 2000	Socorro	LINEAR	V	2.5 km	MPC · JPL
30217	2000 GA_{126}	—	April 7, 2000	Socorro	LINEAR	PHO	4.2 km	MPC · JPL
30218 Paulaladd	2000 GC_{126}	Paulaladd	April 7, 2000	Socorro	LINEAR	·	3.1 km	MPC · JPL
30219	2000 GM_{126}	—	April 7, 2000	Socorro	LINEAR	T_{j} (2.97)	12 km	MPC · JPL
30220	2000 GP_{126}	—	April 7, 2000	Socorro	LINEAR	·	3.4 km	MPC · JPL
30221 LeDonne	2000 GX_{126}	LeDonne	April 7, 2000	Socorro	LINEAR	·	3.0 km	MPC · JPL
30222 Malecki	2000 GA_{134}	Malecki	April 7, 2000	Socorro	LINEAR	·	2.9 km	MPC · JPL
30223	2000 GE_{134}	—	April 7, 2000	Socorro	LINEAR	DOR	9.9 km	MPC · JPL
30224	2000 GU_{136}	—	April 12, 2000	Socorro	LINEAR	EUN	5.7 km	MPC · JPL
30225 Ellenzweibel	2000 GV_{137}	Ellenzweibel	April 4, 2000	Anderson Mesa	LONEOS	THM	6.0 km	MPC · JPL
30226 Samuelleejackson	2000 GY_{137}	Samuelleejackson	April 4, 2000	Anderson Mesa	LONEOS	·	2.9 km	MPC · JPL
30227 Jansensturgeon	2000 GO_{139}	Jansensturgeon	April 4, 2000	Anderson Mesa	LONEOS	·	2.9 km	MPC · JPL
30228 Hushoucun	2000 GO_{141}	Hushoucun	April 7, 2000	Anderson Mesa	LONEOS	GEF	4.5 km	MPC · JPL
30229 Neilbowles	2000 GL_{142}	Neilbowles	April 7, 2000	Anderson Mesa	LONEOS	·	3.8 km	MPC · JPL
30230 Ralucarufu	2000 GP_{142}	Ralucarufu	April 7, 2000	Anderson Mesa	LONEOS	·	3.9 km	MPC · JPL
30231 Patorojo	2000 GZ_{142}	Patorojo	April 7, 2000	Anderson Mesa	LONEOS	EUN	3.9 km	MPC · JPL
30232 Stephaniejarmak	2000 GV_{153}	Stephaniejarmak	April 6, 2000	Anderson Mesa	LONEOS	·	2.3 km	MPC · JPL
30233	2000 GJ_{161}	—	April 7, 2000	Socorro	LINEAR	·	8.4 km	MPC · JPL
30234 Dudziński	2000 GD_{167}	Dudziński	April 4, 2000	Anderson Mesa	LONEOS	H	1.4 km	MPC · JPL
30235 Kimmiller	2000 GR_{179}	Kimmiller	April 5, 2000	Socorro	LINEAR	·	2.3 km	MPC · JPL
30236	2000 HF	—	April 23, 2000	Kurohone	T. Kobayashi	·	5.4 km	MPC · JPL
30237	2000 HY_{1}	—	April 25, 2000	Višnjan Observatory	K. Korlević	·	4.8 km	MPC · JPL
30238	2000 HY_{4}	—	April 27, 2000	Socorro	LINEAR	EOS	5.5 km	MPC · JPL
30239	2000 HZ_{4}	—	April 27, 2000	Socorro	LINEAR	MAR	3.6 km	MPC · JPL
30240 Morgensen	2000 HF_{8}	Morgensen	April 27, 2000	Socorro	LINEAR	·	3.8 km	MPC · JPL
30241 Donnamower	2000 HN_{8}	Donnamower	April 27, 2000	Socorro	LINEAR	·	1.9 km	MPC · JPL
30242 Naymark	2000 HQ_{8}	Naymark	April 27, 2000	Socorro	LINEAR	·	3.8 km	MPC · JPL
30243	2000 HS_{9}	—	April 27, 2000	Socorro	LINEAR	·	1.7 km	MPC · JPL
30244 Linhpham	2000 HP_{10}	Linhpham	April 27, 2000	Socorro	LINEAR	·	2.8 km	MPC · JPL
30245 Paigesmith	2000 HC_{12}	Paigesmith	April 28, 2000	Socorro	LINEAR	·	3.6 km	MPC · JPL
30246	2000 HC_{13}	—	April 28, 2000	Socorro	LINEAR	·	4.0 km	MPC · JPL
30247	2000 HN_{13}	—	April 28, 2000	Socorro	LINEAR	THM	9.6 km	MPC · JPL
30248 Kimstinson	2000 HV_{13}	Kimstinson	April 28, 2000	Socorro	LINEAR	·	7.1 km	MPC · JPL
30249 Zamora	2000 HF_{14}	Zamora	April 28, 2000	Socorro	LINEAR	V	2.8 km	MPC · JPL
30250	2000 HG_{14}	—	April 28, 2000	Socorro	LINEAR	·	7.4 km	MPC · JPL
30251 Ashkin	2000 HR_{22}	Ashkin	April 29, 2000	Socorro	LINEAR	·	2.6 km	MPC · JPL
30252 Textorisová	2000 HE_{24}	Textorisová	April 30, 2000	Ondřejov	P. Kušnirák	·	2.3 km	MPC · JPL
30253 Vítek	2000 HF_{24}	Vítek	April 30, 2000	Ondřejov	P. Kušnirák, P. Pravec	·	2.5 km	MPC · JPL
30254 Kamiński	2000 HZ_{25}	Kamiński	April 24, 2000	Anderson Mesa	LONEOS	KOR	3.3 km	MPC · JPL
30255 Bohner	2000 HK_{26}	Bohner	April 24, 2000	Anderson Mesa	LONEOS	·	2.6 km	MPC · JPL
30256	2000 HC_{30}	—	April 28, 2000	Socorro	LINEAR	·	2.0 km	MPC · JPL
30257 Leejanel	2000 HH_{32}	Leejanel	April 29, 2000	Socorro	LINEAR	·	3.6 km	MPC · JPL
30258	2000 HA_{33}	—	April 29, 2000	Socorro	LINEAR	EUN	3.5 km	MPC · JPL
30259 Catherineli	2000 HC_{35}	Catherineli	April 27, 2000	Socorro	LINEAR	·	2.3 km	MPC · JPL
30260	2000 HY_{35}	—	April 28, 2000	Socorro	LINEAR	V	2.7 km	MPC · JPL
30261	2000 HB_{36}	—	April 28, 2000	Socorro	LINEAR	EUN	3.6 km	MPC · JPL
30262	2000 HP_{41}	—	April 28, 2000	Socorro	LINEAR	·	8.4 km	MPC · JPL
30263	2000 HR_{41}	—	April 28, 2000	Socorro	LINEAR	ADE	8.0 km	MPC · JPL
30264 Galluccio	2000 HT_{44}	Galluccio	April 26, 2000	Anderson Mesa	LONEOS	·	2.7 km	MPC · JPL
30265 Rominagarcía	2000 HH_{45}	Rominagarcía	April 26, 2000	Anderson Mesa	LONEOS	·	1.9 km	MPC · JPL
30266	2000 HW_{48}	—	April 29, 2000	Socorro	LINEAR	EUN	3.7 km	MPC · JPL
30267 Raghuvanshi	2000 HQ_{49}	Raghuvanshi	April 29, 2000	Socorro	LINEAR	·	4.2 km	MPC · JPL
30268 Jessezhang	2000 HM_{50}	Jessezhang	April 29, 2000	Socorro	LINEAR	·	3.5 km	MPC · JPL
30269 Anandapadmanaban	2000 HS_{50}	Anandapadmanaban	April 29, 2000	Socorro	LINEAR	NYS	2.2 km	MPC · JPL
30270 Chemparathy	2000 HJ_{51}	Chemparathy	April 29, 2000	Socorro	LINEAR	NYS	3.7 km	MPC · JPL
30271 Brandoncui	2000 HZ_{51}	Brandoncui	April 29, 2000	Socorro	LINEAR	·	1.8 km	MPC · JPL
30272 D'Mello	2000 HA_{52}	D'Mello	April 29, 2000	Socorro	LINEAR	·	3.7 km	MPC · JPL
30273 Samepstein	2000 HV_{52}	Samepstein	April 29, 2000	Socorro	LINEAR	·	2.4 km	MPC · JPL
30274	2000 HN_{53}	—	April 29, 2000	Socorro	LINEAR	EUN	5.1 km	MPC · JPL
30275 Eskow	2000 HP_{53}	Eskow	April 29, 2000	Socorro	LINEAR	·	3.6 km	MPC · JPL
30276 Noahgolowich	2000 HB_{55}	Noahgolowich	April 29, 2000	Socorro	LINEAR	·	5.2 km	MPC · JPL
30277 Charlesgulian	2000 HF_{55}	Charlesgulian	April 29, 2000	Socorro	LINEAR	·	3.6 km	MPC · JPL
30278 Gazeas	2000 HN_{56}	Gazeas	April 24, 2000	Anderson Mesa	LONEOS	KOR	5.7 km	MPC · JPL
30279 Binnie	2000 HQ_{56}	Binnie	April 24, 2000	Anderson Mesa	LONEOS	·	3.3 km	MPC · JPL
30280 Raderlane	2000 HS_{56}	Raderlane	April 24, 2000	Anderson Mesa	LONEOS	·	3.0 km	MPC · JPL
30281 Horstman	2000 HH_{57}	Horstman	April 24, 2000	Anderson Mesa	LONEOS	·	2.5 km	MPC · JPL
30282 Jamessmith	2000 HQ_{57}	Jamessmith	April 24, 2000	Anderson Mesa	LONEOS	V	2.5 km	MPC · JPL
30283 Shirleysmith	2000 HS_{57}	Shirleysmith	April 24, 2000	Anderson Mesa	LONEOS	·	2.5 km	MPC · JPL
30284	2000 HG_{58}	—	April 24, 2000	Kitt Peak	Spacewatch	·	2.7 km	MPC · JPL
30285 Ellsworth-Bowers	2000 HB_{59}	Ellsworth-Bowers	April 25, 2000	Anderson Mesa	LONEOS	EOS	7.9 km	MPC · JPL
30286 Klesman	2000 HG_{61}	Klesman	April 25, 2000	Anderson Mesa	LONEOS	KOR	3.0 km	MPC · JPL
30287	2000 HK_{62}	—	April 25, 2000	Kitt Peak	Spacewatch	AEO	3.2 km	MPC · JPL
30288 Conelalexander	2000 HT_{62}	Conelalexander	April 26, 2000	Anderson Mesa	LONEOS	HOF	6.6 km	MPC · JPL
30289 Richardcarlson	2000 HP_{65}	Richardcarlson	April 26, 2000	Anderson Mesa	LONEOS	·	1.8 km	MPC · JPL
30290 Noble	2000 HG_{69}	Noble	April 24, 2000	Anderson Mesa	LONEOS	·	2.0 km	MPC · JPL
30291	2000 HL_{71}	—	April 24, 2000	Anderson Mesa	LONEOS	·	5.1 km	MPC · JPL
30292	2000 HJ_{72}	—	April 26, 2000	Anderson Mesa	LONEOS	·	1.8 km	MPC · JPL
30293 Scottnelson	2000 HO_{72}	Scottnelson	April 26, 2000	Anderson Mesa	LONEOS	·	6.3 km	MPC · JPL
30294	2000 HQ_{74}	—	April 27, 2000	Socorro	LINEAR	·	3.8 km	MPC · JPL
30295 Anvitagupta	2000 HV_{74}	Anvitagupta	April 27, 2000	Socorro	LINEAR	·	3.1 km	MPC · JPL
30296 Bricehuang	2000 HZ_{76}	Bricehuang	April 27, 2000	Socorro	LINEAR	·	2.9 km	MPC · JPL
30297 Cupák	2000 HO_{77}	Cupák	April 28, 2000	Anderson Mesa	LONEOS	·	5.7 km	MPC · JPL
30298 Somyakhare	2000 HJ_{81}	Somyakhare	April 29, 2000	Socorro	LINEAR	·	2.3 km	MPC · JPL
30299 Shashkishore	2000 HW_{81}	Shashkishore	April 29, 2000	Socorro	LINEAR	·	4.7 km	MPC · JPL
30300 Waagen	2000 HF_{86}	Waagen	April 30, 2000	Anderson Mesa	LONEOS	EOS	5.3 km	MPC · JPL

== 30301–30400 ==
back to top

Designation			Discovery			Properties		Ref
Permanent	Provisional	Named after	Date	Site	Discoverer(s)	Category	Diam.	Ref
30301 Kuditipudi	2000 HK_{87}	Kuditipudi	April 27, 2000	Socorro	LINEAR	(2076)	2.8 km	MPC · JPL
30302 Kritilall	2000 HS_{88}	Kritilall	April 28, 2000	Socorro	LINEAR	·	2.4 km	MPC · JPL
30303	2000 HS_{93}	—	April 29, 2000	Socorro	LINEAR	·	2.2 km	MPC · JPL
30304 Denisvida	2000 HZ_{103}	Denisvida	April 27, 2000	Anderson Mesa	LONEOS	·	3.0 km	MPC · JPL
30305 Severi	2000 JA	Severi	May 1, 2000	Prescott	P. G. Comba	KOR	4.4 km	MPC · JPL
30306 Frigyesriesz	2000 JD	Frigyesriesz	May 2, 2000	Prescott	P. G. Comba	·	3.4 km	MPC · JPL
30307 Marcelriesz	2000 JE	Marcelriesz	May 2, 2000	Prescott	P. G. Comba	·	7.6 km	MPC · JPL
30308 Ienli	2000 JN_{1}	Ienli	May 1, 2000	Socorro	LINEAR	fast	2.3 km	MPC · JPL
30309	2000 JR_{2}	—	May 3, 2000	Višnjan Observatory	K. Korlević	V	3.2 km	MPC · JPL
30310 Alexanderlin	2000 JO_{9}	Alexanderlin	May 3, 2000	Socorro	LINEAR	·	3.5 km	MPC · JPL
30311	2000 JS_{10}	—	May 9, 2000	Socorro	LINEAR	H	3.6 km	MPC · JPL
30312 Lilyliu	2000 JC_{11}	Lilyliu	May 3, 2000	Socorro	LINEAR	·	3.3 km	MPC · JPL
30313	2000 JF_{14}	—	May 6, 2000	Socorro	LINEAR	LEO	9.4 km	MPC · JPL
30314 Yelenam	2000 JH_{14}	Yelenam	May 6, 2000	Socorro	LINEAR	(883)	3.0 km	MPC · JPL
30315	2000 JM_{14}	—	May 6, 2000	Socorro	LINEAR	·	6.5 km	MPC · JPL
30316 Scottmassa	2000 JT_{14}	Scottmassa	May 6, 2000	Socorro	LINEAR	·	4.0 km	MPC · JPL
30317	2000 JR_{15}	—	May 3, 2000	Socorro	LINEAR	·	5.1 km	MPC · JPL
30318	2000 JW_{15}	—	May 5, 2000	Socorro	LINEAR	·	4.2 km	MPC · JPL
30319	2000 JT_{16}	—	May 5, 2000	Socorro	LINEAR	·	6.0 km	MPC · JPL
30320	2000 JP_{17}	—	May 6, 2000	Socorro	LINEAR	fast	3.4 km	MPC · JPL
30321 McCleary	2000 JT_{17}	McCleary	May 6, 2000	Socorro	LINEAR	·	2.6 km	MPC · JPL
30322	2000 JU_{17}	—	May 6, 2000	Socorro	LINEAR	·	9.3 km	MPC · JPL
30323 Anyam	2000 JV_{17}	Anyam	May 6, 2000	Socorro	LINEAR	·	2.5 km	MPC · JPL
30324 Pandya	2000 JS_{19}	Pandya	May 5, 2000	Socorro	LINEAR	·	1.9 km	MPC · JPL
30325 Reesabpathak	2000 JV_{20}	Reesabpathak	May 6, 2000	Socorro	LINEAR	·	2.8 km	MPC · JPL
30326 Maxpine	2000 JS_{21}	Maxpine	May 6, 2000	Socorro	LINEAR	·	4.0 km	MPC · JPL
30327 Prembabu	2000 JP_{22}	Prembabu	May 6, 2000	Socorro	LINEAR	NEM	7.2 km	MPC · JPL
30328 Emilyspencer	2000 JX_{22}	Emilyspencer	May 7, 2000	Socorro	LINEAR	·	3.0 km	MPC · JPL
30329	2000 JR_{23}	—	May 7, 2000	Socorro	LINEAR	V	2.9 km	MPC · JPL
30330 Tiffanysun	2000 JY_{24}	Tiffanysun	May 7, 2000	Socorro	LINEAR	·	4.6 km	MPC · JPL
30331	2000 JT_{26}	—	May 7, 2000	Socorro	LINEAR	EMA	12 km	MPC · JPL
30332 Tanaytandon	2000 JW_{26}	Tanaytandon	May 7, 2000	Socorro	LINEAR	·	3.9 km	MPC · JPL
30333 Stevenwang	2000 JH_{27}	Stevenwang	May 7, 2000	Socorro	LINEAR	·	3.1 km	MPC · JPL
30334 Michaelwiner	2000 JN_{28}	Michaelwiner	May 7, 2000	Socorro	LINEAR	·	5.7 km	MPC · JPL
30335	2000 JU_{28}	—	May 7, 2000	Socorro	LINEAR	EOS	8.5 km	MPC · JPL
30336 Zhangyizhen	2000 JD_{29}	Zhangyizhen	May 7, 2000	Socorro	LINEAR	·	3.8 km	MPC · JPL
30337 Crystalzheng	2000 JO_{29}	Crystalzheng	May 7, 2000	Socorro	LINEAR	NYS ·	6.4 km	MPC · JPL
30338	2000 JW_{29}	—	May 7, 2000	Socorro	LINEAR	·	2.4 km	MPC · JPL
30339	2000 JQ_{32}	—	May 7, 2000	Socorro	LINEAR	·	3.5 km	MPC · JPL
30340	2000 JY_{32}	—	May 7, 2000	Socorro	LINEAR	·	2.8 km	MPC · JPL
30341	2000 JT_{33}	—	May 7, 2000	Socorro	LINEAR	·	3.7 km	MPC · JPL
30342	2000 JX_{35}	—	May 7, 2000	Socorro	LINEAR	KOR	4.8 km	MPC · JPL
30343	2000 JB_{36}	—	May 7, 2000	Socorro	LINEAR	NYS	2.7 km	MPC · JPL
30344	2000 JG_{36}	—	May 7, 2000	Socorro	LINEAR	·	4.0 km	MPC · JPL
30345	2000 JN_{36}	—	May 7, 2000	Socorro	LINEAR	·	7.0 km	MPC · JPL
30346	2000 JK_{37}	—	May 7, 2000	Socorro	LINEAR	THB	13 km	MPC · JPL
30347 Pattyhunt	2000 JY_{37}	Pattyhunt	May 7, 2000	Socorro	LINEAR	·	2.9 km	MPC · JPL
30348 Marizzabailey	2000 JD_{38}	Marizzabailey	May 7, 2000	Socorro	LINEAR	·	3.5 km	MPC · JPL
30349	2000 JV_{38}	—	May 7, 2000	Socorro	LINEAR	·	7.1 km	MPC · JPL
30350 Beltecas	2000 JA_{39}	Beltecas	May 7, 2000	Socorro	LINEAR	·	2.6 km	MPC · JPL
30351	2000 JK_{39}	—	May 7, 2000	Socorro	LINEAR	EUN	4.1 km	MPC · JPL
30352	2000 JL_{39}	—	May 7, 2000	Socorro	LINEAR	KOR	4.7 km	MPC · JPL
30353 Carothers	2000 JQ_{39}	Carothers	May 7, 2000	Socorro	LINEAR	KOR	3.0 km	MPC · JPL
30354	2000 JR_{39}	—	May 7, 2000	Socorro	LINEAR	THM	5.6 km	MPC · JPL
30355	2000 JU_{39}	—	May 7, 2000	Socorro	LINEAR	·	2.6 km	MPC · JPL
30356	2000 JJ_{41}	—	May 7, 2000	Socorro	LINEAR	·	2.5 km	MPC · JPL
30357 Davisdon	2000 JJ_{45}	Davisdon	May 7, 2000	Socorro	LINEAR	·	2.8 km	MPC · JPL
30358	2000 JF_{49}	—	May 9, 2000	Socorro	LINEAR	V	3.2 km	MPC · JPL
30359	2000 JE_{50}	—	May 9, 2000	Socorro	LINEAR	EUN	3.9 km	MPC · JPL
30360	2000 JY_{50}	—	May 9, 2000	Socorro	LINEAR	·	3.3 km	MPC · JPL
30361	2000 JJ_{51}	—	May 9, 2000	Socorro	LINEAR	·	4.1 km	MPC · JPL
30362 Jenniferdean	2000 JD_{54}	Jenniferdean	May 6, 2000	Socorro	LINEAR	·	1.8 km	MPC · JPL
30363 Dellasantina	2000 JW_{54}	Dellasantina	May 6, 2000	Socorro	LINEAR	NYS	4.5 km	MPC · JPL
30364	2000 JX_{54}	—	May 6, 2000	Socorro	LINEAR	NYS	4.6 km	MPC · JPL
30365 Gregduran	2000 JO_{55}	Gregduran	May 6, 2000	Socorro	LINEAR	·	2.5 km	MPC · JPL
30366	2000 JC_{57}	—	May 6, 2000	Socorro	LINEAR	EUN	4.7 km	MPC · JPL
30367	2000 JS_{57}	—	May 6, 2000	Socorro	LINEAR	GEF	4.5 km	MPC · JPL
30368 Ericferrante	2000 JT_{57}	Ericferrante	May 6, 2000	Socorro	LINEAR	slow	4.5 km	MPC · JPL
30369	2000 JU_{58}	—	May 6, 2000	Socorro	LINEAR	·	5.0 km	MPC · JPL
30370 Jongoetz	2000 JA_{59}	Jongoetz	May 6, 2000	Socorro	LINEAR	·	3.1 km	MPC · JPL
30371 Johngorman	2000 JR_{59}	Johngorman	May 7, 2000	Socorro	LINEAR	·	2.9 km	MPC · JPL
30372 Halback	2000 JK_{62}	Halback	May 7, 2000	Socorro	LINEAR	·	2.5 km	MPC · JPL
30373 Mattharley	2000 JO_{62}	Mattharley	May 9, 2000	Socorro	LINEAR	V	2.0 km	MPC · JPL
30374 Bobbiehinson	2000 JU_{62}	Bobbiehinson	May 9, 2000	Socorro	LINEAR	V	2.0 km	MPC · JPL
30375 Kathuang	2000 JD_{63}	Kathuang	May 9, 2000	Socorro	LINEAR	·	2.5 km	MPC · JPL
30376	2000 JE_{65}	—	May 5, 2000	Socorro	LINEAR	ADE	14 km	MPC · JPL
30377	2000 JL_{66}	—	May 6, 2000	Socorro	LINEAR	EUN · slow	5.1 km	MPC · JPL
30378	2000 JW_{67}	—	May 6, 2000	Kitt Peak	Spacewatch	·	3.7 km	MPC · JPL
30379 Molaro	2000 JY_{69}	Molaro	May 2, 2000	Anderson Mesa	LONEOS	·	6.7 km	MPC · JPL
30380	2000 JE_{76}	—	May 6, 2000	Socorro	LINEAR	·	2.4 km	MPC · JPL
30381	2000 JN_{76}	—	May 6, 2000	Socorro	LINEAR	·	5.2 km	MPC · JPL
30382	2000 JB_{81}	—	May 15, 2000	Črni Vrh	Mikuž, H.	·	3.3 km	MPC · JPL
30383	2000 KZ_{1}	—	May 26, 2000	Črni Vrh	Mikuž, H.	slow	2.8 km	MPC · JPL
30384 Robertirelan	2000 KK_{3}	Robertirelan	May 27, 2000	Socorro	LINEAR	·	3.0 km	MPC · JPL
30385	2000 KG_{8}	—	May 27, 2000	Socorro	LINEAR	·	4.6 km	MPC · JPL
30386 Philipjeffery	2000 KL_{16}	Philipjeffery	May 28, 2000	Socorro	LINEAR	·	4.6 km	MPC · JPL
30387	2000 KN_{16}	—	May 28, 2000	Socorro	LINEAR	EUN	4.6 km	MPC · JPL
30388 Nicolejustice	2000 KJ_{17}	Nicolejustice	May 28, 2000	Socorro	LINEAR	·	4.9 km	MPC · JPL
30389 Ledoux	2000 KW_{17}	Ledoux	May 28, 2000	Socorro	LINEAR	·	3.5 km	MPC · JPL
30390	2000 KX_{17}	—	May 28, 2000	Socorro	LINEAR	·	8.4 km	MPC · JPL
30391	2000 KA_{23}	—	May 28, 2000	Socorro	LINEAR	EOS	4.9 km	MPC · JPL
30392	2000 KX_{26}	—	May 28, 2000	Socorro	LINEAR	·	4.6 km	MPC · JPL
30393	2000 KN_{30}	—	May 28, 2000	Socorro	LINEAR	LEO	9.6 km	MPC · JPL
30394	2000 KZ_{32}	—	May 28, 2000	Socorro	LINEAR	THM	11 km	MPC · JPL
30395	2000 KQ_{36}	—	May 28, 2000	Socorro	LINEAR	·	7.2 km	MPC · JPL
30396 Annleonard	2000 KV_{36}	Annleonard	May 28, 2000	Socorro	LINEAR	·	5.8 km	MPC · JPL
30397	2000 KU_{39}	—	May 24, 2000	Kitt Peak	Spacewatch	·	6.0 km	MPC · JPL
30398	2000 KM_{41}	—	May 30, 2000	Ondřejov	P. Kušnirák	·	11 km	MPC · JPL
30399	2000 KF_{42}	—	May 28, 2000	Socorro	LINEAR	·	6.7 km	MPC · JPL
30400	2000 KL_{42}	—	May 28, 2000	Socorro	LINEAR	PHO	2.9 km	MPC · JPL

== 30401–30500 ==
back to top

Designation			Discovery			Properties		Ref
Permanent	Provisional	Named after	Date	Site	Discoverer(s)	Category	Diam.	Ref
30401	2000 KO_{47}	—	May 28, 2000	Socorro	LINEAR	URS	15 km	MPC · JPL
30402 Esthergoddard	2000 KN_{50}	Esthergoddard	May 23, 2000	Anderson Mesa	LONEOS	·	3.1 km	MPC · JPL
30403	2000 KR_{50}	—	May 27, 2000	Socorro	LINEAR	EUN	4.7 km	MPC · JPL
30404	2000 KN_{51}	—	May 31, 2000	Kitt Peak	Spacewatch	·	2.7 km	MPC · JPL
30405 Yunakwon	2000 KE_{52}	Yunakwon	May 23, 2000	Anderson Mesa	LONEOS	·	2.1 km	MPC · JPL
30406 Middleman	2000 KU_{54}	Middleman	May 27, 2000	Socorro	LINEAR	·	3.3 km	MPC · JPL
30407 Pantano	2000 KK_{55}	Pantano	May 27, 2000	Socorro	LINEAR	·	2.3 km	MPC · JPL
30408	2000 KW_{55}	—	May 27, 2000	Socorro	LINEAR	TEL	4.4 km	MPC · JPL
30409 Piccirillo	2000 KY_{55}	Piccirillo	May 27, 2000	Socorro	LINEAR	·	3.8 km	MPC · JPL
30410	2000 KU_{56}	—	May 27, 2000	Socorro	LINEAR	EOS	5.6 km	MPC · JPL
30411 Besse	2000 KP_{57}	Besse	May 24, 2000	Anderson Mesa	LONEOS	·	6.2 km	MPC · JPL
30412 Anthonylagain	2000 KJ_{58}	Anthonylagain	May 24, 2000	Anderson Mesa	LONEOS	·	4.5 km	MPC · JPL
30413 Slatkin	2000 KS_{59}	Slatkin	May 25, 2000	Anderson Mesa	LONEOS	·	8.3 km	MPC · JPL
30414 Pistacchi	2000 KC_{69}	Pistacchi	May 29, 2000	Socorro	LINEAR	·	3.1 km	MPC · JPL
30415	2000 KT_{74}	—	May 27, 2000	Socorro	LINEAR	·	4.0 km	MPC · JPL
30416 Schacht	2000 KG_{76}	Schacht	May 27, 2000	Socorro	LINEAR	·	2.7 km	MPC · JPL
30417 Staudt	2000 LF	Staudt	June 1, 2000	Prescott	P. G. Comba	MIS	9.9 km	MPC · JPL
30418 Jakobsteiner	2000 LG	Jakobsteiner	June 1, 2000	Prescott	P. G. Comba	ADE	7.4 km	MPC · JPL
30419	2000 LU	—	June 2, 2000	Reedy Creek	J. Broughton	·	6.8 km	MPC · JPL
30420	2000 LD_{1}	—	June 1, 2000	Črni Vrh	Matičič, S.	·	5.0 km	MPC · JPL
30421 Jameschafer	2000 LM_{2}	Jameschafer	June 4, 2000	Socorro	LINEAR	GEF	4.1 km	MPC · JPL
30422	2000 LE_{4}	—	June 4, 2000	Socorro	LINEAR	·	5.9 km	MPC · JPL
30423	2000 LG_{4}	—	June 4, 2000	Socorro	LINEAR	·	11 km	MPC · JPL
30424	2000 LS_{4}	—	June 5, 2000	Socorro	LINEAR	·	3.4 km	MPC · JPL
30425 Silverman	2000 LP_{7}	Silverman	June 5, 2000	Socorro	LINEAR	MRX	3.3 km	MPC · JPL
30426 Philtalbot	2000 LU_{8}	Philtalbot	June 5, 2000	Socorro	LINEAR	·	3.2 km	MPC · JPL
30427	2000 LX_{8}	—	June 5, 2000	Socorro	LINEAR	KOR	4.8 km	MPC · JPL
30428	2000 LP_{11}	—	June 4, 2000	Socorro	LINEAR	·	7.9 km	MPC · JPL
30429	2000 LR_{11}	—	June 4, 2000	Socorro	LINEAR	EOS	6.9 km	MPC · JPL
30430 Robertoegel	2000 LO_{16}	Robertoegel	June 4, 2000	Socorro	LINEAR	·	2.6 km	MPC · JPL
30431 Michaeltran	2000 LR_{16}	Michaeltran	June 4, 2000	Socorro	LINEAR	·	2.5 km	MPC · JPL
30432	2000 LM_{20}	—	June 8, 2000	Socorro	LINEAR	EUN	6.5 km	MPC · JPL
30433	2000 LJ_{21}	—	June 8, 2000	Socorro	LINEAR	·	14 km	MPC · JPL
30434	2000 LQ_{21}	—	June 8, 2000	Socorro	LINEAR	·	11 km	MPC · JPL
30435 Slyusarev	2000 LB_{29}	Slyusarev	June 9, 2000	Anderson Mesa	LONEOS	3:2	10 km	MPC · JPL
30436 Busemann	2000 LC_{29}	Busemann	June 9, 2000	Anderson Mesa	LONEOS	·	6.8 km	MPC · JPL
30437 Michtchenko	2000 LE_{32}	Michtchenko	June 5, 2000	Anderson Mesa	LONEOS	V	3.5 km	MPC · JPL
30438 Yongikbyun	2000 LL_{34}	Yongikbyun	June 3, 2000	Anderson Mesa	LONEOS	·	5.2 km	MPC · JPL
30439 Moe	2000 MB	Moe	June 21, 2000	Reedy Creek	J. Broughton	·	7.9 km	MPC · JPL
30440 Larry	2000 MG	Larry	June 22, 2000	Reedy Creek	J. Broughton	·	5.7 km	MPC · JPL
30441 Curly	2000 MX	Curly	June 24, 2000	Reedy Creek	J. Broughton	HYG	9.1 km	MPC · JPL
30442	2000 MO_{4}	—	June 25, 2000	Socorro	LINEAR	EOS	7.7 km	MPC · JPL
30443 Stieltjes	2000 NR	Stieltjes	July 3, 2000	Prescott	P. G. Comba	·	8.3 km	MPC · JPL
30444 Shemp	2000 NY_{1}	Shemp	July 5, 2000	Reedy Creek	J. Broughton	GEF	4.1 km	MPC · JPL
30445 Stirling	2000 NJ_{2}	Stirling	July 5, 2000	Prescott	P. G. Comba	EUN	4.3 km	MPC · JPL
30446	2000 NO_{2}	—	July 3, 2000	Socorro	LINEAR	·	6.7 km	MPC · JPL
30447	2000 NO_{3}	—	July 3, 2000	Socorro	LINEAR	·	5.0 km	MPC · JPL
30448 Yoshiomoriyama	2000 NV_{3}	Yoshiomoriyama	July 7, 2000	Bisei SG Center	BATTeRS	EUN	4.6 km	MPC · JPL
30449 Caldas	2000 NH_{13}	Caldas	July 5, 2000	Anderson Mesa	LONEOS	·	9.2 km	MPC · JPL
30450	2000 NM_{20}	—	July 6, 2000	Kitt Peak	Spacewatch	EOS	5.7 km	MPC · JPL
30451	2000 NX_{23}	—	July 5, 2000	Kitt Peak	Spacewatch	·	7.9 km	MPC · JPL
30452 Callegari	2000 NR_{24}	Callegari	July 4, 2000	Anderson Mesa	LONEOS	·	5.2 km	MPC · JPL
30453 Cambioni	2000 NQ_{25}	Cambioni	July 4, 2000	Anderson Mesa	LONEOS	·	11 km	MPC · JPL
30454 Carrillosánchez	2000 NK_{26}	Carrillosánchez	July 4, 2000	Anderson Mesa	LONEOS	·	8.2 km	MPC · JPL
30455 Joelcastro	2000 NB_{27}	Joelcastro	July 4, 2000	Anderson Mesa	LONEOS	·	7.2 km	MPC · JPL
30456	2000 OY_{1}	—	July 23, 2000	Socorro	LINEAR	·	8.2 km	MPC · JPL
30457	2000 OZ_{3}	—	July 24, 2000	Socorro	LINEAR	EOS	6.3 km	MPC · JPL
30458	2000 OC_{6}	—	July 24, 2000	Socorro	LINEAR	·	7.6 km	MPC · JPL
30459	2000 OK_{6}	—	July 29, 2000	Socorro	LINEAR	BAP	4.1 km	MPC · JPL
30460	2000 OT_{6}	—	July 29, 2000	Socorro	LINEAR	EOS	12 km	MPC · JPL
30461	2000 OZ_{9}	—	July 23, 2000	Socorro	LINEAR	MRX	4.5 km	MPC · JPL
30462	2000 OM_{10}	—	July 23, 2000	Socorro	LINEAR	EOS	6.8 km	MPC · JPL
30463	2000 OE_{11}	—	July 23, 2000	Socorro	LINEAR	EOS	5.9 km	MPC · JPL
30464	2000 OH_{12}	—	July 23, 2000	Socorro	LINEAR	·	5.2 km	MPC · JPL
30465	2000 OY_{13}	—	July 23, 2000	Socorro	LINEAR	·	12 km	MPC · JPL
30466	2000 OP_{14}	—	July 23, 2000	Socorro	LINEAR	EOS	12 km	MPC · JPL
30467	2000 OV_{14}	—	July 23, 2000	Socorro	LINEAR	·	8.1 km	MPC · JPL
30468	2000 OW_{16}	—	July 23, 2000	Socorro	LINEAR	·	12 km	MPC · JPL
30469	2000 OZ_{16}	—	July 23, 2000	Socorro	LINEAR	THM	7.9 km	MPC · JPL
30470	2000 OR_{19}	—	July 30, 2000	Socorro	LINEAR	·	8.8 km	MPC · JPL
30471	2000 OF_{20}	—	July 30, 2000	Socorro	LINEAR	·	9.8 km	MPC · JPL
30472	2000 OM_{23}	—	July 23, 2000	Socorro	LINEAR	·	19 km	MPC · JPL
30473 Ethanbutson	2000 OP_{23}	Ethanbutson	July 23, 2000	Socorro	LINEAR	·	9.7 km	MPC · JPL
30474	2000 OE_{26}	—	July 23, 2000	Socorro	LINEAR	GEF	3.9 km	MPC · JPL
30475	2000 OA_{32}	—	July 30, 2000	Socorro	LINEAR	·	12 km	MPC · JPL
30476	2000 OY_{34}	—	July 30, 2000	Socorro	LINEAR	·	6.4 km	MPC · JPL
30477	2000 OM_{36}	—	July 30, 2000	Socorro	LINEAR	·	4.2 km	MPC · JPL
30478	2000 OQ_{37}	—	July 30, 2000	Socorro	LINEAR	·	10 km	MPC · JPL
30479	2000 OW_{37}	—	July 30, 2000	Socorro	LINEAR	CYB	10 km	MPC · JPL
30480	2000 OH_{40}	—	July 30, 2000	Socorro	LINEAR	CLO	3.6 km	MPC · JPL
30481	2000 OX_{40}	—	July 30, 2000	Socorro	LINEAR	·	5.3 km	MPC · JPL
30482	2000 OG_{45}	—	July 30, 2000	Socorro	LINEAR	URS	24 km	MPC · JPL
30483 Harringtonpinto	2000 OG_{52}	Harringtonpinto	July 24, 2000	Anderson Mesa	LONEOS	·	12 km	MPC · JPL
30484	2000 PD_{6}	—	August 5, 2000	Haleakala	NEAT	EOS	4.8 km	MPC · JPL
30485	2000 PK_{16}	—	August 1, 2000	Socorro	LINEAR	·	5.7 km	MPC · JPL
30486	2000 PE_{23}	—	August 2, 2000	Socorro	LINEAR	·	8.1 km	MPC · JPL
30487 Dominikovacs	2000 QG_{10}	Dominikovacs	August 24, 2000	Socorro	LINEAR	THM	9.6 km	MPC · JPL
30488 Steinlechner	2000 QJ_{11}	Steinlechner	August 24, 2000	Socorro	LINEAR	KOR	4.4 km	MPC · JPL
30489	2000 QL_{32}	—	August 26, 2000	Socorro	LINEAR	·	10 km	MPC · JPL
30490	2000 QP_{33}	—	August 26, 2000	Socorro	LINEAR	·	14 km	MPC · JPL
30491	2000 QJ_{38}	—	August 24, 2000	Socorro	LINEAR	THM	8.7 km	MPC · JPL
30492	2000 QQ_{40}	—	August 24, 2000	Socorro	LINEAR	THM	10 km	MPC · JPL
30493	2000 QM_{48}	—	August 24, 2000	Socorro	LINEAR	·	11 km	MPC · JPL
30494	2000 QD_{67}	—	August 28, 2000	Socorro	LINEAR	·	11 km	MPC · JPL
30495	2000 QZ_{72}	—	August 24, 2000	Socorro	LINEAR	·	11 km	MPC · JPL
30496	2000 QN_{80}	—	August 24, 2000	Socorro	LINEAR	EOS · slow	5.7 km	MPC · JPL
30497	2000 QH_{97}	—	August 28, 2000	Socorro	LINEAR	slow	17 km	MPC · JPL
30498	2000 QK_{100}	—	August 28, 2000	Socorro	LINEAR	L5	22 km	MPC · JPL
30499	2000 QE_{169}	—	August 31, 2000	Socorro	LINEAR	L5	21 km	MPC · JPL
30500	2000 QC_{193}	—	August 29, 2000	Socorro	LINEAR	THM	8.0 km	MPC · JPL

== 30501–30600 ==
back to top

Designation			Discovery			Properties		Ref
Permanent	Provisional	Named after	Date	Site	Discoverer(s)	Category	Diam.	Ref
30501	2000 RH_{17}	—	September 1, 2000	Socorro	LINEAR	·	13 km	MPC · JPL
30502	2000 RY_{29}	—	September 1, 2000	Socorro	LINEAR	·	8.1 km	MPC · JPL
30503	2000 RW_{79}	—	September 1, 2000	Socorro	LINEAR	EOS	8.5 km	MPC · JPL
30504	2000 RS_{80}	—	September 1, 2000	Socorro	LINEAR	L5	29 km	MPC · JPL
30505	2000 RW_{82}	—	September 1, 2000	Socorro	LINEAR	L5	26 km	MPC · JPL
30506	2000 RO_{85}	—	September 2, 2000	Anderson Mesa	LONEOS	L5	34 km	MPC · JPL
30507	2000 SK_{8}	—	September 19, 2000	Haleakala	NEAT	EOS	9.9 km	MPC · JPL
30508	2000 SZ_{130}	—	September 22, 2000	Socorro	LINEAR	L5	16 km	MPC · JPL
30509 Yukitrippel	2000 YQ_{105}	Yukitrippel	December 28, 2000	Socorro	LINEAR	·	5.0 km	MPC · JPL
30510	2001 DM_{44}	—	February 19, 2001	Socorro	LINEAR	L4	19 km	MPC · JPL
30511	2001 FS_{29}	—	March 18, 2001	Haleakala	NEAT	·	3.5 km	MPC · JPL
30512	2001 HO_{8}	—	April 21, 2001	Socorro	LINEAR	T_{j} (2.82)	18 km	MPC · JPL
30513	2001 HE_{48}	—	April 21, 2001	Socorro	LINEAR	·	4.0 km	MPC · JPL
30514 Chiomento	2001 HQ_{49}	Chiomento	April 21, 2001	Socorro	LINEAR	·	5.1 km	MPC · JPL
30515	2001 KZ_{29}	—	May 21, 2001	Socorro	LINEAR	MAR	3.4 km	MPC · JPL
30516	2001 LB_{7}	—	June 15, 2001	Socorro	LINEAR	GEF	4.1 km	MPC · JPL
30517	2001 LJ_{15}	—	June 11, 2001	Kitt Peak	Spacewatch	SYL · CYB	15 km	MPC · JPL
30518	2001 LE_{16}	—	June 13, 2001	Kitt Peak	Spacewatch	V	2.3 km	MPC · JPL
30519	2001 ML_{9}	—	June 21, 2001	Palomar	NEAT	·	2.2 km	MPC · JPL
30520	2001 MM_{11}	—	June 19, 2001	Palomar	NEAT	V	2.1 km	MPC · JPL
30521 Garyferland	2001 MU_{14}	Garyferland	June 28, 2001	Anderson Mesa	LONEOS	·	4.2 km	MPC · JPL
30522	2001 MQ_{15}	—	June 25, 2001	Palomar	NEAT	·	6.4 km	MPC · JPL
30523	2001 MK_{23}	—	June 27, 2001	Palomar	NEAT	·	10 km	MPC · JPL
30524 Mandushev	2001 MY_{24}	Mandushev	June 16, 2001	Anderson Mesa	LONEOS	·	2.1 km	MPC · JPL
30525 Lenbright	2001 MX_{28}	Lenbright	June 27, 2001	Anderson Mesa	LONEOS	·	2.9 km	MPC · JPL
30526	2001 NC_{2}	—	July 13, 2001	Reedy Creek	J. Broughton	·	2.6 km	MPC · JPL
30527	2001 NW_{10}	—	July 14, 2001	Haleakala	NEAT	EOS	5.8 km	MPC · JPL
30528	2001 NT_{17}	—	July 14, 2001	Haleakala	NEAT	·	1.6 km	MPC · JPL
30529	2001 NE_{18}	—	July 10, 2001	Socorro	LINEAR	·	15 km	MPC · JPL
30530	2001 NS_{18}	—	July 12, 2001	Haleakala	NEAT	NYS	2.4 km	MPC · JPL
30531	2001 ND_{21}	—	July 14, 2001	Palomar	NEAT	·	9.1 km	MPC · JPL
30532	2001 OO	—	July 17, 2001	Haleakala	NEAT	EOS	3.8 km	MPC · JPL
30533 Saeidzoonemat	2001 OV_{4}	Saeidzoonemat	July 16, 2001	Anderson Mesa	LONEOS	NYS	2.2 km	MPC · JPL
30534 Holler	2001 OA_{5}	Holler	July 17, 2001	Anderson Mesa	LONEOS	·	16 km	MPC · JPL
30535 Sarahgreenstreet	2001 OR_{5}	Sarahgreenstreet	July 17, 2001	Anderson Mesa	LONEOS	H	2.1 km	MPC · JPL
30536 Erondón	2001 OJ_{7}	Erondón	July 17, 2001	Anderson Mesa	LONEOS	GEF	5.0 km	MPC · JPL
30537 Matteocrismani	2001 OR_{8}	Matteocrismani	July 17, 2001	Anderson Mesa	LONEOS	·	5.7 km	MPC · JPL
30538	2001 OG_{12}	—	July 20, 2001	Palomar	NEAT	EOS	7.5 km	MPC · JPL
30539 Raissamuller	2001 OT_{13}	Raissamuller	July 20, 2001	Socorro	LINEAR	·	2.1 km	MPC · JPL
30540	2001 ON_{14}	—	July 20, 2001	Socorro	LINEAR	·	8.5 km	MPC · JPL
30541 Delgadillo	2001 OG_{20}	Delgadillo	July 21, 2001	Anderson Mesa	LONEOS	·	11 km	MPC · JPL
30542	2001 OG_{23}	—	July 21, 2001	Palomar	NEAT	HNS	4.7 km	MPC · JPL
30543	2001 OE_{27}	—	July 18, 2001	Palomar	NEAT	·	6.0 km	MPC · JPL
30544	2001 OO_{32}	—	July 19, 2001	Palomar	NEAT	V	1.7 km	MPC · JPL
30545	2001 OT_{35}	—	July 21, 2001	Palomar	NEAT	·	22 km	MPC · JPL
30546	2001 OA_{38}	—	July 20, 2001	Palomar	NEAT	V	2.0 km	MPC · JPL
30547	2001 OS_{44}	—	July 23, 2001	Haleakala	NEAT	·	3.3 km	MPC · JPL
30548 Markburchell	2001 OT_{45}	Markburchell	July 16, 2001	Anderson Mesa	LONEOS	·	4.2 km	MPC · JPL
30549 Dylanshort	2001 OE_{46}	Dylanshort	July 16, 2001	Anderson Mesa	LONEOS	·	3.4 km	MPC · JPL
30550 Curtschneider	2001 OH_{47}	Curtschneider	July 16, 2001	Anderson Mesa	LONEOS	·	6.7 km	MPC · JPL
30551	2001 OH_{50}	—	July 19, 2001	Haleakala	NEAT	·	1.7 km	MPC · JPL
30552	2001 OM_{54}	—	July 22, 2001	Palomar	NEAT	·	6.4 km	MPC · JPL
30553 Arcoverde	2001 OV_{56}	Arcoverde	July 16, 2001	Anderson Mesa	LONEOS	(5)	3.9 km	MPC · JPL
30554	2001 OP_{57}	—	July 19, 2001	Palomar	NEAT	V	1.8 km	MPC · JPL
30555	2001 OM_{59}	—	July 21, 2001	Haleakala	NEAT	PHO	3.8 km	MPC · JPL
30556	2001 OX_{59}	—	July 21, 2001	Haleakala	NEAT	·	3.9 km	MPC · JPL
30557	2001 OD_{67}	—	July 26, 2001	Palomar	NEAT	(5)	2.9 km	MPC · JPL
30558 Jamesoconnor	2001 OC_{68}	Jamesoconnor	July 16, 2001	Anderson Mesa	LONEOS	·	2.6 km	MPC · JPL
30559 Cyrusavery	2001 OG_{68}	Cyrusavery	July 16, 2001	Anderson Mesa	LONEOS	RAF	2.9 km	MPC · JPL
30560	2001 OO_{71}	—	July 20, 2001	Palomar	NEAT	·	1.9 km	MPC · JPL
30561	2001 OP_{71}	—	July 20, 2001	Palomar	NEAT	MRX	5.1 km	MPC · JPL
30562 Güttler	2001 ON_{72}	Güttler	July 21, 2001	Anderson Mesa	LONEOS	THM	7.5 km	MPC · JPL
30563	2001 OZ_{75}	—	July 27, 2001	Haleakala	NEAT	KOR	3.1 km	MPC · JPL
30564 Olomouc	2001 OC_{77}	Olomouc	July 28, 2001	Ondřejov	P. Pravec	(5)	2.7 km	MPC · JPL
30565	2001 OV_{80}	—	July 29, 2001	Socorro	LINEAR	·	4.9 km	MPC · JPL
30566 Stokes	2001 OO_{81}	Stokes	July 29, 2001	Prescott	P. G. Comba	NYS	3.5 km	MPC · JPL
30567	2001 OR_{90}	—	July 25, 2001	Haleakala	NEAT	·	2.1 km	MPC · JPL
30568	2001 OQ_{91}	—	July 31, 2001	Palomar	NEAT	EUN	4.3 km	MPC · JPL
30569 Dybczyński	2001 OG_{94}	Dybczyński	July 27, 2001	Anderson Mesa	LONEOS	·	6.4 km	MPC · JPL
30570	2001 OO_{96}	—	July 24, 2001	Palomar	NEAT	V	3.0 km	MPC · JPL
30571	2001 OW_{97}	—	July 25, 2001	Haleakala	NEAT	·	3.1 km	MPC · JPL
30572	2001 OE_{98}	—	July 25, 2001	Palomar	NEAT	EOS	7.5 km	MPC · JPL
30573	2001 OR_{99}	—	July 27, 2001	Anderson Mesa	LONEOS	·	2.6 km	MPC · JPL
30574	2001 OQ_{100}	—	July 27, 2001	Anderson Mesa	LONEOS	·	2.3 km	MPC · JPL
30575 Anacarolina	2001 OM_{101}	Anacarolina	July 28, 2001	Anderson Mesa	LONEOS	slow	10 km	MPC · JPL
30576 Lago	2001 OC_{103}	Lago	July 29, 2001	Anderson Mesa	LONEOS	·	6.2 km	MPC · JPL
30577 Pinchuk	2001 OU_{103}	Pinchuk	July 29, 2001	Anderson Mesa	LONEOS	H	1.7 km	MPC · JPL
30578 Lawless	2001 OD_{105}	Lawless	July 28, 2001	Anderson Mesa	LONEOS	·	4.5 km	MPC · JPL
30579	2001 OW_{107}	—	July 30, 2001	Socorro	LINEAR	EUN	4.3 km	MPC · JPL
30580	2001 PG_{2}	—	August 3, 2001	Haleakala	NEAT	·	5.5 km	MPC · JPL
30581	2001 PY_{2}	—	August 3, 2001	Haleakala	NEAT	·	7.4 km	MPC · JPL
30582	2001 PJ_{3}	—	August 5, 2001	Palomar	NEAT	·	3.0 km	MPC · JPL
30583	2001 PZ_{6}	—	August 10, 2001	Haleakala	NEAT	MAR	2.8 km	MPC · JPL
30584	2001 PF_{9}	—	August 11, 2001	Haleakala	NEAT	EUN	5.7 km	MPC · JPL
30585 Firenze	2001 PE_{14}	Firenze	August 14, 2001	San Marcello	A. Boattini, M. Tombelli	·	2.8 km	MPC · JPL
30586	2001 PV_{21}	—	August 10, 2001	Haleakala	NEAT	·	1.5 km	MPC · JPL
30587	2001 PC_{33}	—	August 10, 2001	Palomar	NEAT	EUN	4.9 km	MPC · JPL
30588	2001 PC_{35}	—	August 10, 2001	Palomar	NEAT	·	17 km	MPC · JPL
30589	2001 QQ_{7}	—	August 16, 2001	Socorro	LINEAR	EOS	7.2 km	MPC · JPL
30590	2001 QZ_{9}	—	August 16, 2001	Socorro	LINEAR	·	1.6 km	MPC · JPL
30591	2001 QG_{10}	—	August 16, 2001	Socorro	LINEAR	slow	8.0 km	MPC · JPL
30592	2001 QO_{10}	—	August 16, 2001	Socorro	LINEAR	·	4.3 km	MPC · JPL
30593 Dangovski	2001 QZ_{16}	Dangovski	August 16, 2001	Socorro	LINEAR	·	6.0 km	MPC · JPL
30594	2001 QD_{30}	—	August 16, 2001	Socorro	LINEAR	·	16 km	MPC · JPL
30595	2001 QE_{43}	—	August 16, 2001	Socorro	LINEAR	·	6.1 km	MPC · JPL
30596 Amdeans	2001 QQ_{65}	Amdeans	August 17, 2001	Socorro	LINEAR	·	5.1 km	MPC · JPL
30597	2001 QP_{69}	—	August 17, 2001	Socorro	LINEAR	·	4.5 km	MPC · JPL
30598	2001 QA_{117}	—	August 17, 2001	Socorro	LINEAR	EUN	6.3 km	MPC · JPL
30599	2052 P-L	—	September 24, 1960	Palomar	C. J. van Houten, I. van Houten-Groeneveld, T. Gehrels	·	1.5 km	MPC · JPL
30600	2078 P-L	—	September 26, 1960	Palomar	C. J. van Houten, I. van Houten-Groeneveld, T. Gehrels	·	6.7 km	MPC · JPL

== 30601–30700 ==
back to top

Designation			Discovery			Properties		Ref
Permanent	Provisional	Named after	Date	Site	Discoverer(s)	Category	Diam.	Ref
30601	2082 P-L	—	September 24, 1960	Palomar	C. J. van Houten, I. van Houten-Groeneveld, T. Gehrels	·	2.1 km	MPC · JPL
30602	2086 P-L	—	September 24, 1960	Palomar	C. J. van Houten, I. van Houten-Groeneveld, T. Gehrels	(5)	3.3 km	MPC · JPL
30603	2106 P-L	—	September 24, 1960	Palomar	C. J. van Houten, I. van Houten-Groeneveld, T. Gehrels	·	2.2 km	MPC · JPL
30604	2107 P-L	—	September 24, 1960	Palomar	C. J. van Houten, I. van Houten-Groeneveld, T. Gehrels	(2076)	2.4 km	MPC · JPL
30605	2204 P-L	—	September 24, 1960	Palomar	C. J. van Houten, I. van Houten-Groeneveld, T. Gehrels	BAP	2.5 km	MPC · JPL
30606	2503 P-L	—	September 26, 1960	Palomar	C. J. van Houten, I. van Houten-Groeneveld, T. Gehrels	MAR	5.0 km	MPC · JPL
30607	2507 P-L	—	September 24, 1960	Palomar	C. J. van Houten, I. van Houten-Groeneveld, T. Gehrels	(2076)	2.5 km	MPC · JPL
30608	2573 P-L	—	September 24, 1960	Palomar	C. J. van Houten, I. van Houten-Groeneveld, T. Gehrels	(5)	3.0 km	MPC · JPL
30609	2618 P-L	—	September 24, 1960	Palomar	C. J. van Houten, I. van Houten-Groeneveld, T. Gehrels	·	4.3 km	MPC · JPL
30610	2623 P-L	—	September 24, 1960	Palomar	C. J. van Houten, I. van Houten-Groeneveld, T. Gehrels	·	2.6 km	MPC · JPL
30611	2627 P-L	—	September 24, 1960	Palomar	C. J. van Houten, I. van Houten-Groeneveld, T. Gehrels	·	3.6 km	MPC · JPL
30612	2638 P-L	—	September 24, 1960	Palomar	C. J. van Houten, I. van Houten-Groeneveld, T. Gehrels	·	2.2 km	MPC · JPL
30613	2678 P-L	—	September 24, 1960	Palomar	C. J. van Houten, I. van Houten-Groeneveld, T. Gehrels	MAS	2.9 km	MPC · JPL
30614	2778 P-L	—	September 24, 1960	Palomar	C. J. van Houten, I. van Houten-Groeneveld, T. Gehrels	·	4.5 km	MPC · JPL
30615	2818 P-L	—	September 24, 1960	Palomar	C. J. van Houten, I. van Houten-Groeneveld, T. Gehrels	·	3.9 km	MPC · JPL
30616	3049 P-L	—	September 24, 1960	Palomar	C. J. van Houten, I. van Houten-Groeneveld, T. Gehrels	·	3.4 km	MPC · JPL
30617	3068 P-L	—	September 25, 1960	Palomar	C. J. van Houten, I. van Houten-Groeneveld, T. Gehrels	·	3.9 km	MPC · JPL
30618	3084 P-L	—	September 25, 1960	Palomar	C. J. van Houten, I. van Houten-Groeneveld, T. Gehrels	·	2.7 km	MPC · JPL
30619	4045 P-L	—	September 24, 1960	Palomar	C. J. van Houten, I. van Houten-Groeneveld, T. Gehrels	·	3.4 km	MPC · JPL
30620	4126 P-L	—	September 24, 1960	Palomar	C. J. van Houten, I. van Houten-Groeneveld, T. Gehrels	·	2.4 km	MPC · JPL
30621	4189 P-L	—	September 24, 1960	Palomar	C. J. van Houten, I. van Houten-Groeneveld, T. Gehrels	(5)	3.2 km	MPC · JPL
30622	4213 P-L	—	September 24, 1960	Palomar	C. J. van Houten, I. van Houten-Groeneveld, T. Gehrels	TEL	3.4 km	MPC · JPL
30623	4226 P-L	—	September 25, 1960	Palomar	C. J. van Houten, I. van Houten-Groeneveld, T. Gehrels	NYS	2.1 km	MPC · JPL
30624	4232 P-L	—	September 24, 1960	Palomar	C. J. van Houten, I. van Houten-Groeneveld, T. Gehrels	NYS	2.4 km	MPC · JPL
30625	4236 P-L	—	September 24, 1960	Palomar	C. J. van Houten, I. van Houten-Groeneveld, T. Gehrels	·	2.3 km	MPC · JPL
30626	4240 P-L	—	September 24, 1960	Palomar	C. J. van Houten, I. van Houten-Groeneveld, T. Gehrels	EOS	4.2 km	MPC · JPL
30627	4269 P-L	—	September 24, 1960	Palomar	C. J. van Houten, I. van Houten-Groeneveld, T. Gehrels	TEL ·	10 km	MPC · JPL
30628	4644 P-L	—	September 24, 1960	Palomar	C. J. van Houten, I. van Houten-Groeneveld, T. Gehrels	PAD	4.4 km	MPC · JPL
30629	4667 P-L	—	September 26, 1960	Palomar	C. J. van Houten, I. van Houten-Groeneveld, T. Gehrels	·	8.2 km	MPC · JPL
30630	4733 P-L	—	September 24, 1960	Palomar	C. J. van Houten, I. van Houten-Groeneveld, T. Gehrels	·	2.5 km	MPC · JPL
30631	6026 P-L	—	September 24, 1960	Palomar	C. J. van Houten, I. van Houten-Groeneveld, T. Gehrels	GEF	2.1 km	MPC · JPL
30632	6117 P-L	—	September 26, 1960	Palomar	C. J. van Houten, I. van Houten-Groeneveld, T. Gehrels	·	4.7 km	MPC · JPL
30633	6120 P-L	—	September 24, 1960	Palomar	C. J. van Houten, I. van Houten-Groeneveld, T. Gehrels	(5)	2.5 km	MPC · JPL
30634	6128 P-L	—	September 24, 1960	Palomar	C. J. van Houten, I. van Houten-Groeneveld, T. Gehrels	·	2.4 km	MPC · JPL
30635	6186 P-L	—	September 24, 1960	Palomar	C. J. van Houten, I. van Houten-Groeneveld, T. Gehrels	·	1.8 km	MPC · JPL
30636	6190 P-L	—	September 24, 1960	Palomar	C. J. van Houten, I. van Houten-Groeneveld, T. Gehrels	·	2.0 km	MPC · JPL
30637	6196 P-L	—	September 24, 1960	Palomar	C. J. van Houten, I. van Houten-Groeneveld, T. Gehrels	EOS	4.5 km	MPC · JPL
30638	6237 P-L	—	September 24, 1960	Palomar	C. J. van Houten, I. van Houten-Groeneveld, T. Gehrels	·	4.9 km	MPC · JPL
30639	6246 P-L	—	September 24, 1960	Palomar	C. J. van Houten, I. van Houten-Groeneveld, T. Gehrels	·	8.7 km	MPC · JPL
30640	6319 P-L	—	September 24, 1960	Palomar	C. J. van Houten, I. van Houten-Groeneveld, T. Gehrels	·	2.1 km	MPC · JPL
30641	6349 P-L	—	September 24, 1960	Palomar	C. J. van Houten, I. van Houten-Groeneveld, T. Gehrels	·	3.4 km	MPC · JPL
30642	6532 P-L	—	September 24, 1960	Palomar	C. J. van Houten, I. van Houten-Groeneveld, T. Gehrels	(5)	2.1 km	MPC · JPL
30643	6590 P-L	—	September 24, 1960	Palomar	C. J. van Houten, I. van Houten-Groeneveld, T. Gehrels	EOS	5.5 km	MPC · JPL
30644	6601 P-L	—	September 24, 1960	Palomar	C. J. van Houten, I. van Houten-Groeneveld, T. Gehrels	·	1.9 km	MPC · JPL
30645	6604 P-L	—	September 24, 1960	Palomar	C. J. van Houten, I. van Houten-Groeneveld, T. Gehrels	·	2.4 km	MPC · JPL
30646	6623 P-L	—	September 24, 1960	Palomar	C. J. van Houten, I. van Houten-Groeneveld, T. Gehrels	·	4.2 km	MPC · JPL
30647	6642 P-L	—	September 24, 1960	Palomar	C. J. van Houten, I. van Houten-Groeneveld, T. Gehrels	·	2.1 km	MPC · JPL
30648	6679 P-L	—	September 24, 1960	Palomar	C. J. van Houten, I. van Houten-Groeneveld, T. Gehrels	·	3.4 km	MPC · JPL
30649	6871 P-L	—	September 24, 1960	Palomar	C. J. van Houten, I. van Houten-Groeneveld, T. Gehrels	·	1.6 km	MPC · JPL
30650	7638 P-L	—	October 17, 1960	Palomar	C. J. van Houten, I. van Houten-Groeneveld, T. Gehrels	·	4.6 km	MPC · JPL
30651	9588 P-L	—	October 17, 1960	Palomar	C. J. van Houten, I. van Houten-Groeneveld, T. Gehrels	·	3.7 km	MPC · JPL
30652	1236 T-1	—	March 25, 1971	Palomar	C. J. van Houten, I. van Houten-Groeneveld, T. Gehrels	·	2.3 km	MPC · JPL
30653	2190 T-1	—	March 25, 1971	Palomar	C. J. van Houten, I. van Houten-Groeneveld, T. Gehrels	·	3.3 km	MPC · JPL
30654	2234 T-1	—	March 25, 1971	Palomar	C. J. van Houten, I. van Houten-Groeneveld, T. Gehrels	·	5.1 km	MPC · JPL
30655	2289 T-1	—	March 25, 1971	Palomar	C. J. van Houten, I. van Houten-Groeneveld, T. Gehrels	GEF	5.5 km	MPC · JPL
30656	3098 T-1	—	March 26, 1971	Palomar	C. J. van Houten, I. van Houten-Groeneveld, T. Gehrels	·	18 km	MPC · JPL
30657	3258 T-1	—	March 26, 1971	Palomar	C. J. van Houten, I. van Houten-Groeneveld, T. Gehrels	·	4.2 km	MPC · JPL
30658	4042 T-1	—	March 26, 1971	Palomar	C. J. van Houten, I. van Houten-Groeneveld, T. Gehrels	·	4.4 km	MPC · JPL
30659	4109 T-1	—	March 26, 1971	Palomar	C. J. van Houten, I. van Houten-Groeneveld, T. Gehrels	THM	9.0 km	MPC · JPL
30660	4142 T-1	—	March 26, 1971	Palomar	C. J. van Houten, I. van Houten-Groeneveld, T. Gehrels	·	1.7 km	MPC · JPL
30661	4166 T-1	—	March 26, 1971	Palomar	C. J. van Houten, I. van Houten-Groeneveld, T. Gehrels	·	9.5 km	MPC · JPL
30662	4256 T-1	—	March 26, 1971	Palomar	C. J. van Houten, I. van Houten-Groeneveld, T. Gehrels	·	12 km	MPC · JPL
30663	1026 T-2	—	September 29, 1973	Palomar	C. J. van Houten, I. van Houten-Groeneveld, T. Gehrels	·	2.6 km	MPC · JPL
30664	1040 T-2	—	September 29, 1973	Palomar	C. J. van Houten, I. van Houten-Groeneveld, T. Gehrels	·	2.3 km	MPC · JPL
30665	1144 T-2	—	September 29, 1973	Palomar	C. J. van Houten, I. van Houten-Groeneveld, T. Gehrels	NYS	2.4 km	MPC · JPL
30666	1156 T-2	—	September 29, 1973	Palomar	C. J. van Houten, I. van Houten-Groeneveld, T. Gehrels	·	2.8 km	MPC · JPL
30667	1177 T-2	—	September 29, 1973	Palomar	C. J. van Houten, I. van Houten-Groeneveld, T. Gehrels	·	3.6 km	MPC · JPL
30668	1227 T-2	—	September 29, 1973	Palomar	C. J. van Houten, I. van Houten-Groeneveld, T. Gehrels	·	5.8 km	MPC · JPL
30669	1234 T-2	—	September 29, 1973	Palomar	C. J. van Houten, I. van Houten-Groeneveld, T. Gehrels	·	2.1 km	MPC · JPL
30670	1283 T-2	—	September 29, 1973	Palomar	C. J. van Houten, I. van Houten-Groeneveld, T. Gehrels	THM	7.7 km	MPC · JPL
30671	1314 T-2	—	September 29, 1973	Palomar	C. J. van Houten, I. van Houten-Groeneveld, T. Gehrels	·	2.8 km	MPC · JPL
30672	1346 T-2	—	September 29, 1973	Palomar	C. J. van Houten, I. van Houten-Groeneveld, T. Gehrels	THM	8.2 km	MPC · JPL
30673	1409 T-2	—	September 30, 1973	Palomar	C. J. van Houten, I. van Houten-Groeneveld, T. Gehrels	·	3.8 km	MPC · JPL
30674	1455 T-2	—	September 30, 1973	Palomar	C. J. van Houten, I. van Houten-Groeneveld, T. Gehrels	PAD	7.7 km	MPC · JPL
30675	2042 T-2	—	September 29, 1973	Palomar	C. J. van Houten, I. van Houten-Groeneveld, T. Gehrels	·	3.6 km	MPC · JPL
30676	2201 T-2	—	September 29, 1973	Palomar	C. J. van Houten, I. van Houten-Groeneveld, T. Gehrels	·	2.8 km	MPC · JPL
30677	2231 T-2	—	September 29, 1973	Palomar	C. J. van Houten, I. van Houten-Groeneveld, T. Gehrels	GEF	2.5 km	MPC · JPL
30678	2265 T-2	—	September 29, 1973	Palomar	C. J. van Houten, I. van Houten-Groeneveld, T. Gehrels	·	1.6 km	MPC · JPL
30679	2303 T-2	—	September 29, 1973	Palomar	C. J. van Houten, I. van Houten-Groeneveld, T. Gehrels	·	2.0 km	MPC · JPL
30680	3029 T-2	—	September 30, 1973	Palomar	C. J. van Houten, I. van Houten-Groeneveld, T. Gehrels	AST	4.3 km	MPC · JPL
30681	3084 T-2	—	September 30, 1973	Palomar	C. J. van Houten, I. van Houten-Groeneveld, T. Gehrels	V	2.0 km	MPC · JPL
30682	3209 T-2	—	September 30, 1973	Palomar	C. J. van Houten, I. van Houten-Groeneveld, T. Gehrels	HYG	9.7 km	MPC · JPL
30683	3211 T-2	—	September 30, 1973	Palomar	C. J. van Houten, I. van Houten-Groeneveld, T. Gehrels	THM	8.2 km	MPC · JPL
30684	3237 T-2	—	September 30, 1973	Palomar	C. J. van Houten, I. van Houten-Groeneveld, T. Gehrels	LIX	7.3 km	MPC · JPL
30685	3243 T-2	—	September 30, 1973	Palomar	C. J. van Houten, I. van Houten-Groeneveld, T. Gehrels	·	2.2 km	MPC · JPL
30686	3288 T-2	—	September 30, 1973	Palomar	C. J. van Houten, I. van Houten-Groeneveld, T. Gehrels	THM	9.0 km	MPC · JPL
30687	3347 T-2	—	September 25, 1973	Palomar	C. J. van Houten, I. van Houten-Groeneveld, T. Gehrels	·	1.7 km	MPC · JPL
30688	4194 T-2	—	September 29, 1973	Palomar	C. J. van Houten, I. van Houten-Groeneveld, T. Gehrels	·	5.3 km	MPC · JPL
30689	4318 T-2	—	September 29, 1973	Palomar	C. J. van Houten, I. van Houten-Groeneveld, T. Gehrels	·	2.3 km	MPC · JPL
30690	4633 T-2	—	September 30, 1973	Palomar	C. J. van Houten, I. van Houten-Groeneveld, T. Gehrels	·	5.0 km	MPC · JPL
30691	4810 T-2	—	September 25, 1973	Palomar	C. J. van Houten, I. van Houten-Groeneveld, T. Gehrels	GEF	3.2 km	MPC · JPL
30692	5040 T-2	—	September 25, 1973	Palomar	C. J. van Houten, I. van Houten-Groeneveld, T. Gehrels	(194)	3.2 km	MPC · JPL
30693	5069 T-2	—	September 25, 1973	Palomar	C. J. van Houten, I. van Houten-Groeneveld, T. Gehrels	DOR	9.5 km	MPC · JPL
30694	5112 T-2	—	September 25, 1973	Palomar	C. J. van Houten, I. van Houten-Groeneveld, T. Gehrels	·	8.6 km	MPC · JPL
30695	1020 T-3	—	October 17, 1977	Palomar	C. J. van Houten, I. van Houten-Groeneveld, T. Gehrels	·	2.3 km	MPC · JPL
30696	1110 T-3	—	October 17, 1977	Palomar	C. J. van Houten, I. van Houten-Groeneveld, T. Gehrels	·	3.2 km	MPC · JPL
30697	2137 T-3	—	October 16, 1977	Palomar	C. J. van Houten, I. van Houten-Groeneveld, T. Gehrels	·	3.8 km	MPC · JPL
30698 Hippokoon	2299 T-3	Hippokoon	October 16, 1977	Palomar	C. J. van Houten, I. van Houten-Groeneveld, T. Gehrels	L5	18 km	MPC · JPL
30699	2356 T-3	—	October 16, 1977	Palomar	C. J. van Houten, I. van Houten-Groeneveld, T. Gehrels	·	2.5 km	MPC · JPL
30700	2367 T-3	—	October 16, 1977	Palomar	C. J. van Houten, I. van Houten-Groeneveld, T. Gehrels	·	3.1 km	MPC · JPL

== 30701–30800 ==
back to top

Designation			Discovery			Properties		Ref
Permanent	Provisional	Named after	Date	Site	Discoverer(s)	Category	Diam.	Ref
30701	2381 T-3	—	October 16, 1977	Palomar	C. J. van Houten, I. van Houten-Groeneveld, T. Gehrels	·	1.7 km	MPC · JPL
30702	3042 T-3	—	October 16, 1977	Palomar	C. J. van Houten, I. van Houten-Groeneveld, T. Gehrels	·	3.1 km	MPC · JPL
30703	3101 T-3	—	October 16, 1977	Palomar	C. J. van Houten, I. van Houten-Groeneveld, T. Gehrels	·	3.5 km	MPC · JPL
30704 Phegeus	3250 T-3	Phegeus	October 16, 1977	Palomar	C. J. van Houten, I. van Houten-Groeneveld, T. Gehrels	L5	27 km	MPC · JPL
30705 Idaios	3365 T-3	Idaios	October 16, 1977	Palomar	C. J. van Houten, I. van Houten-Groeneveld, T. Gehrels	L5	45 km	MPC · JPL
30706	4026 T-3	—	October 16, 1977	Palomar	C. J. van Houten, I. van Houten-Groeneveld, T. Gehrels	·	2.4 km	MPC · JPL
30707	4075 T-3	—	October 16, 1977	Palomar	C. J. van Houten, I. van Houten-Groeneveld, T. Gehrels	·	5.5 km	MPC · JPL
30708 Echepolos	4101 T-3	Echepolos	October 16, 1977	Palomar	C. J. van Houten, I. van Houten-Groeneveld, T. Gehrels	L5	25 km	MPC · JPL
30709	4107 T-3	—	October 16, 1977	Palomar	C. J. van Houten, I. van Houten-Groeneveld, T. Gehrels	·	1.8 km	MPC · JPL
30710	4137 T-3	—	October 16, 1977	Palomar	C. J. van Houten, I. van Houten-Groeneveld, T. Gehrels	·	5.8 km	MPC · JPL
30711	4186 T-3	—	October 16, 1977	Palomar	C. J. van Houten, I. van Houten-Groeneveld, T. Gehrels	·	2.0 km	MPC · JPL
30712	4207 T-3	—	October 16, 1977	Palomar	C. J. van Houten, I. van Houten-Groeneveld, T. Gehrels	·	9.5 km	MPC · JPL
30713	4216 T-3	—	October 16, 1977	Palomar	C. J. van Houten, I. van Houten-Groeneveld, T. Gehrels	·	1.8 km	MPC · JPL
30714	4282 T-3	—	October 16, 1977	Palomar	C. J. van Houten, I. van Houten-Groeneveld, T. Gehrels	·	2.9 km	MPC · JPL
30715	5034 T-3	—	October 16, 1977	Palomar	C. J. van Houten, I. van Houten-Groeneveld, T. Gehrels	BRA	5.9 km	MPC · JPL
30716	5107 T-3	—	October 16, 1977	Palomar	C. J. van Houten, I. van Houten-Groeneveld, T. Gehrels	·	2.1 km	MPC · JPL
30717 Berkowski	1937 UD	Berkowski	October 26, 1937	Heidelberg	K. Reinmuth	·	3.0 km	MPC · JPL
30718 Records	1955 RB_{1}	Records	September 14, 1955	Brooklyn	Indiana University	·	9.2 km	MPC · JPL
30719 Isserstedt	1963 RJ	Isserstedt	September 13, 1963	Tautenburg Observatory	K. W. Kamper	·	8.4 km	MPC · JPL
30720 Fernándezlajús	1969 GB	Fernándezlajús	April 9, 1969	El Leoncito	C. U. Cesco	·	10 km	MPC · JPL
30721	1975 ST_{1}	—	September 30, 1975	Palomar	S. J. Bus	EOS	5.5 km	MPC · JPL
30722 Biblioran	1978 RN_{5}	Biblioran	September 6, 1978	Nauchnij	N. S. Chernykh	·	3.3 km	MPC · JPL
30723	1978 RU_{8}	—	September 2, 1978	La Silla	C.-I. Lagerkvist	·	8.1 km	MPC · JPL
30724 Peterburgtrista	1978 SX_{2}	Peterburgtrista	September 26, 1978	Nauchnij	L. V. Zhuravleva	·	21 km	MPC · JPL
30725 Klimov	1978 SA_{8}	Klimov	September 26, 1978	Nauchnij	L. V. Zhuravleva	NYS	7.4 km	MPC · JPL
30726	1978 VK_{7}	—	November 7, 1978	Palomar	E. F. Helin, S. J. Bus	·	2.9 km	MPC · JPL
30727	1979 MC_{9}	—	June 25, 1979	Siding Spring	E. F. Helin, S. J. Bus	NYS	1.7 km	MPC · JPL
30728	1979 QD_{2}	—	August 22, 1979	La Silla	C.-I. Lagerkvist	·	6.2 km	MPC · JPL
30729	1980 TA	—	October 11, 1980	Harvard Observatory	Harvard Observatory	(2076)	4.7 km	MPC · JPL
30730	1981 DL	—	February 28, 1981	Siding Spring	S. J. Bus	·	6.7 km	MPC · JPL
30731	1981 EK_{2}	—	March 2, 1981	Siding Spring	S. J. Bus	GEF ·	4.6 km	MPC · JPL
30732	1981 EQ_{2}	—	March 2, 1981	Siding Spring	S. J. Bus	V	2.4 km	MPC · JPL
30733	1981 EJ_{3}	—	March 2, 1981	Siding Spring	S. J. Bus	ADE	8.6 km	MPC · JPL
30734	1981 ES_{3}	—	March 2, 1981	Siding Spring	S. J. Bus	EUN	4.6 km	MPC · JPL
30735	1981 EF_{7}	—	March 6, 1981	Siding Spring	S. J. Bus	V	1.7 km	MPC · JPL
30736	1981 EU_{7}	—	March 1, 1981	Siding Spring	S. J. Bus	V	1.7 km	MPC · JPL
30737	1981 ER_{9}	—	March 1, 1981	Siding Spring	S. J. Bus	·	8.3 km	MPC · JPL
30738	1981 EO_{11}	—	March 7, 1981	Siding Spring	S. J. Bus	·	2.8 km	MPC · JPL
30739	1981 EN_{14}	—	March 1, 1981	Siding Spring	S. J. Bus	·	3.4 km	MPC · JPL
30740	1981 ET_{14}	—	March 1, 1981	Siding Spring	S. J. Bus	·	6.5 km	MPC · JPL
30741	1981 EQ_{15}	—	March 1, 1981	Siding Spring	S. J. Bus	·	3.7 km	MPC · JPL
30742	1981 EG_{17}	—	March 1, 1981	Siding Spring	S. J. Bus	·	8.6 km	MPC · JPL
30743	1981 EQ_{17}	—	March 1, 1981	Siding Spring	S. J. Bus	·	4.2 km	MPC · JPL
30744	1981 EN_{18}	—	March 2, 1981	Siding Spring	S. J. Bus	·	5.1 km	MPC · JPL
30745	1981 EB_{22}	—	March 2, 1981	Siding Spring	S. J. Bus	THM	6.1 km	MPC · JPL
30746	1981 EG_{24}	—	March 7, 1981	Siding Spring	S. J. Bus	·	6.0 km	MPC · JPL
30747	1981 EM_{25}	—	March 2, 1981	Siding Spring	S. J. Bus	·	1.6 km	MPC · JPL
30748	1981 ES_{25}	—	March 2, 1981	Siding Spring	S. J. Bus	·	3.9 km	MPC · JPL
30749	1981 ER_{26}	—	March 2, 1981	Siding Spring	S. J. Bus	V	2.2 km	MPC · JPL
30750	1981 EY_{28}	—	March 1, 1981	Siding Spring	S. J. Bus	·	5.3 km	MPC · JPL
30751	1981 EL_{29}	—	March 1, 1981	Siding Spring	S. J. Bus	·	3.0 km	MPC · JPL
30752	1981 EQ_{33}	—	March 1, 1981	Siding Spring	S. J. Bus	·	3.1 km	MPC · JPL
30753	1981 EL_{38}	—	March 1, 1981	Siding Spring	S. J. Bus	·	3.4 km	MPC · JPL
30754	1981 EB_{39}	—	March 2, 1981	Siding Spring	S. J. Bus	·	3.1 km	MPC · JPL
30755	1981 EO_{39}	—	March 2, 1981	Siding Spring	S. J. Bus	·	4.1 km	MPC · JPL
30756	1981 ET_{39}	—	March 2, 1981	Siding Spring	S. J. Bus	HYG	8.2 km	MPC · JPL
30757	1981 EB_{40}	—	March 2, 1981	Siding Spring	S. J. Bus	THM	5.1 km	MPC · JPL
30758	1981 EN_{41}	—	March 2, 1981	Siding Spring	S. J. Bus	·	3.2 km	MPC · JPL
30759	1981 EV_{41}	—	March 2, 1981	Siding Spring	S. J. Bus	·	3.0 km	MPC · JPL
30760	1981 EY_{41}	—	March 2, 1981	Siding Spring	S. J. Bus	NYS	1.7 km	MPC · JPL
30761	1981 EF_{42}	—	March 2, 1981	Siding Spring	S. J. Bus	·	4.1 km	MPC · JPL
30762	1981 ES_{42}	—	March 2, 1981	Siding Spring	S. J. Bus	·	5.0 km	MPC · JPL
30763	1981 EJ_{47}	—	March 2, 1981	Siding Spring	S. J. Bus	V	1.2 km	MPC · JPL
30764	1981 EK_{47}	—	March 2, 1981	Siding Spring	S. J. Bus	3:2 · SHU	12 km	MPC · JPL
30765	1981 EJ_{48}	—	March 6, 1981	Siding Spring	S. J. Bus	·	2.5 km	MPC · JPL
30766	1981 UX_{22}	—	October 24, 1981	Palomar	S. J. Bus	·	6.7 km	MPC · JPL
30767 Chriskraft	1983 VQ_{1}	Chriskraft	November 6, 1983	Palomar	C. S. Shoemaker, E. M. Shoemaker	·	4.5 km	MPC · JPL
30768	1983 YK	—	December 29, 1983	Pino Torinese	Massone, G., G. de Sanctis	·	18 km	MPC · JPL
30769 Kaydash	1984 ST_{2}	Kaydash	September 25, 1984	Anderson Mesa	B. A. Skiff	·	3.2 km	MPC · JPL
30770	1984 SL_{4}	—	September 27, 1984	Kleť	A. Mrkos	·	5.4 km	MPC · JPL
30771	1986 PO_{2}	—	August 1, 1986	Palomar	E. F. Helin	·	4.7 km	MPC · JPL
30772	1986 RJ_{1}	—	September 2, 1986	Kleť	A. Mrkos	ERI	6.3 km	MPC · JPL
30773 Schelde	1986 RJ_{4}	Schelde	September 6, 1986	Smolyan	E. W. Elst	PHO	10 km	MPC · JPL
30774	1987 BU_{1}	—	January 25, 1987	La Silla	E. W. Elst	·	5.4 km	MPC · JPL
30775 Lattu	1987 QX	Lattu	August 24, 1987	Palomar	E. F. Helin	·	3.1 km	MPC · JPL
30776	1987 QY	—	August 24, 1987	Palomar	E. F. Helin	PHO	2.7 km	MPC · JPL
30777	1987 SB_{3}	—	September 21, 1987	Smolyan	E. W. Elst	·	3.6 km	MPC · JPL
30778 Döblin	1987 SX_{10}	Döblin	September 29, 1987	Tautenburg Observatory	F. Börngen	·	7.3 km	MPC · JPL
30779 Sankt-Stephan	1987 UE_{1}	Sankt-Stephan	October 17, 1987	Palomar	C. S. Shoemaker, E. M. Shoemaker	PHO	2.6 km	MPC · JPL
30780	1988 CA_{2}	—	February 11, 1988	La Silla	E. W. Elst	V	2.2 km	MPC · JPL
30781	1988 CR_{2}	—	February 11, 1988	La Silla	E. W. Elst	·	3.2 km	MPC · JPL
30782	1988 CC_{4}	—	February 13, 1988	La Silla	E. W. Elst	·	5.2 km	MPC · JPL
30783	1988 CO_{4}	—	February 13, 1988	La Silla	E. W. Elst	·	2.7 km	MPC · JPL
30784	1988 PO	—	August 11, 1988	Palomar	Mikolajczak, C., Coker, R.	EUN	6.3 km	MPC · JPL
30785 Greeley	1988 PX	Greeley	August 13, 1988	Palomar	C. S. Shoemaker, E. M. Shoemaker	·	1.3 km	MPC · JPL
30786 Karkoschka	1988 QC	Karkoschka	August 18, 1988	Palomar	C. S. Shoemaker, E. M. Shoemaker	·	1.5 km	MPC · JPL
30787	1988 RC	—	September 7, 1988	Brorfelde	P. Jensen	·	11 km	MPC · JPL
30788 Angekauffmann	1988 RE_{3}	Angekauffmann	September 8, 1988	Tautenburg Observatory	F. Börngen	·	15 km	MPC · JPL
30789	1988 RB_{6}	—	September 3, 1988	La Silla	H. Debehogne	·	8.9 km	MPC · JPL
30790	1988 RT_{11}	—	September 14, 1988	Cerro Tololo	S. J. Bus	·	2.6 km	MPC · JPL
30791	1988 RY_{11}	—	September 14, 1988	Cerro Tololo	S. J. Bus	L5	20 km	MPC · JPL
30792	1988 RP_{12}	—	September 14, 1988	Cerro Tololo	S. J. Bus	L5	18 km	MPC · JPL
30793	1988 SJ_{3}	—	September 16, 1988	Cerro Tololo	S. J. Bus	L5	19 km	MPC · JPL
30794	1988 TR_{1}	—	October 15, 1988	Gekko	Y. Oshima	EUN · slow	4.2 km	MPC · JPL
30795	1989 AR_{5}	—	January 4, 1989	Siding Spring	R. H. McNaught	·	5.5 km	MPC · JPL
30796	1989 CU_{2}	—	February 4, 1989	La Silla	E. W. Elst	GEF	3.5 km	MPC · JPL
30797 Chimborazo	1989 CV_{2}	Chimborazo	February 4, 1989	La Silla	E. W. Elst	EUN	3.8 km	MPC · JPL
30798 Graubünden	1989 CR_{5}	Graubünden	February 2, 1989	Tautenburg Observatory	F. Börngen	·	7.6 km	MPC · JPL
30799	1989 LH	—	June 4, 1989	Palomar	E. F. Helin	·	6.4 km	MPC · JPL
30800	1989 ST	—	September 29, 1989	Kushiro	S. Ueda, H. Kaneda	·	3.1 km	MPC · JPL

== 30801–30900 ==
back to top

Designation			Discovery			Properties		Ref
Permanent	Provisional	Named after	Date	Site	Discoverer(s)	Category	Diam.	Ref
30801	1989 SS_{1}	—	September 26, 1989	La Silla	E. W. Elst	·	3.1 km	MPC · JPL
30802	1989 SH_{3}	—	September 26, 1989	La Silla	E. W. Elst	·	3.4 km	MPC · JPL
30803	1989 SG_{14}	—	September 26, 1989	Calar Alto	J. M. Baur, K. Birkle	·	3.9 km	MPC · JPL
30804	1989 TO_{14}	—	October 2, 1989	La Silla	H. Debehogne	THM	8.4 km	MPC · JPL
30805 Mikimasa	1989 UO_{2}	Mikimasa	October 21, 1989	Kitami	K. Endate, K. Watanabe	·	2.7 km	MPC · JPL
30806	1989 UP_{5}	—	October 30, 1989	Cerro Tololo	S. J. Bus	L5	13 km	MPC · JPL
30807	1989 UQ_{5}	—	October 30, 1989	Cerro Tololo	S. J. Bus	L5	21 km	MPC · JPL
30808	1989 YA_{2}	—	December 30, 1989	Siding Spring	R. H. McNaught	·	3.9 km	MPC · JPL
30809	1990 EO_{8}	—	March 7, 1990	La Silla	H. Debehogne	·	9.2 km	MPC · JPL
30810	1990 FM	—	March 23, 1990	Palomar	E. F. Helin	·	8.6 km	MPC · JPL
30811	1990 OD_{2}	—	July 29, 1990	Palomar	H. E. Holt	·	2.4 km	MPC · JPL
30812	1990 OZ_{4}	—	July 25, 1990	Palomar	H. E. Holt	·	1.4 km	MPC · JPL
30813	1990 QT	—	August 19, 1990	Palomar	E. F. Helin	·	4.3 km	MPC · JPL
30814	1990 QW	—	August 19, 1990	Palomar	E. F. Helin	V	3.7 km	MPC · JPL
30815	1990 QH_{2}	—	August 22, 1990	Palomar	H. E. Holt	·	3.5 km	MPC · JPL
30816	1990 QA_{6}	—	August 29, 1990	Palomar	H. E. Holt	·	2.9 km	MPC · JPL
30817	1990 QN_{9}	—	August 16, 1990	La Silla	E. W. Elst	·	3.4 km	MPC · JPL
30818	1990 RH_{2}	—	September 14, 1990	Palomar	H. E. Holt	V	1.9 km	MPC · JPL
30819	1990 RL_{2}	—	September 15, 1990	Palomar	C. M. Olmstead	·	5.8 km	MPC · JPL
30820	1990 RU_{2}	—	September 15, 1990	Palomar	H. E. Holt	·	3.8 km	MPC · JPL
30821 Chernetenko	1990 RR_{17}	Chernetenko	September 15, 1990	Nauchnij	L. V. Zhuravleva	·	3.6 km	MPC · JPL
30822	1990 SX_{5}	—	September 22, 1990	La Silla	E. W. Elst	·	2.4 km	MPC · JPL
30823	1990 SY_{15}	—	September 16, 1990	Palomar	H. E. Holt	V	2.5 km	MPC · JPL
30824	1990 TD	—	October 9, 1990	Siding Spring	R. H. McNaught	·	3.6 km	MPC · JPL
30825	1990 TG_{1}	—	October 14, 1990	Kitt Peak	Spacewatch	APO +1km	4.0 km	MPC · JPL
30826 Coulomb	1990 TS_{1}	Coulomb	October 10, 1990	Tautenburg Observatory	F. Börngen, L. D. Schmadel	·	9.3 km	MPC · JPL
30827 Lautenschläger	1990 TE_{2}	Lautenschläger	October 10, 1990	Tautenburg Observatory	L. D. Schmadel, F. Börngen	·	3.4 km	MPC · JPL
30828 Bethe	1990 TK_{4}	Bethe	October 12, 1990	Tautenburg Observatory	F. Börngen, L. D. Schmadel	·	4.4 km	MPC · JPL
30829 Wolfwacker	1990 TE_{9}	Wolfwacker	October 10, 1990	Tautenburg Observatory	L. D. Schmadel, F. Börngen	·	3.1 km	MPC · JPL
30830 Jahn	1990 TQ_{12}	Jahn	October 14, 1990	Tautenburg Observatory	F. Börngen, L. D. Schmadel	·	4.0 km	MPC · JPL
30831 Seignovert	1990 TO_{14}	Seignovert	October 14, 1990	Palomar	K. J. Lawrence, E. F. Helin	H	1.8 km	MPC · JPL
30832 Urbaincreve	1990 UC_{5}	Urbaincreve	October 16, 1990	La Silla	E. W. Elst	·	4.4 km	MPC · JPL
30833	1990 VM_{4}	—	November 15, 1990	La Silla	E. W. Elst	·	3.4 km	MPC · JPL
30834	1990 VR_{6}	—	November 15, 1990	La Silla	E. W. Elst	V	2.8 km	MPC · JPL
30835 Waterloo	1990 WB_{7}	Waterloo	November 21, 1990	La Silla	E. W. Elst	·	3.9 km	MPC · JPL
30836 Schnittke	1991 AU_{2}	Schnittke	January 15, 1991	Tautenburg Observatory	F. Börngen	·	3.5 km	MPC · JPL
30837 Steinheil	1991 AW_{2}	Steinheil	January 15, 1991	Tautenburg Observatory	F. Börngen	·	11 km	MPC · JPL
30838 Hitomiyamasaki	1991 CM_{1}	Hitomiyamasaki	February 7, 1991	Geisei	T. Seki	·	2.8 km	MPC · JPL
30839	1991 GH_{1}	—	April 11, 1991	Kushiro	S. Ueda, H. Kaneda	·	4.9 km	MPC · JPL
30840 Jackalice	1991 GC_{2}	Jackalice	April 15, 1991	Palomar	C. S. Shoemaker, D. H. Levy	·	4.7 km	MPC · JPL
30841	1991 GA_{3}	—	April 8, 1991	La Silla	E. W. Elst	·	2.3 km	MPC · JPL
30842	1991 GO_{7}	—	April 8, 1991	La Silla	E. W. Elst	·	3.0 km	MPC · JPL
30843	1991 JK_{1}	—	May 8, 1991	Palomar	E. F. Helin	·	6.9 km	MPC · JPL
30844 Hukeller	1991 KE	Hukeller	May 17, 1991	Palomar	C. S. Shoemaker, E. M. Shoemaker	·	11 km	MPC · JPL
30845	1991 PQ_{3}	—	August 2, 1991	La Silla	E. W. Elst	AGN	3.8 km	MPC · JPL
30846	1991 PJ_{17}	—	August 9, 1991	Palomar	H. E. Holt	·	2.0 km	MPC · JPL
30847 Lampert	1991 RC_{5}	Lampert	September 13, 1991	Tautenburg Observatory	L. D. Schmadel, F. Börngen	EOS	10 km	MPC · JPL
30848	1991 RZ_{19}	—	September 14, 1991	Palomar	H. E. Holt	GEF	5.1 km	MPC · JPL
30849	1991 RE_{20}	—	September 14, 1991	Palomar	H. E. Holt	·	10 km	MPC · JPL
30850 Vonsiemens	1991 TN_{2}	Vonsiemens	October 7, 1991	Tautenburg Observatory	F. Börngen, L. D. Schmadel	·	8.5 km	MPC · JPL
30851 Reißfelder	1991 TD_{6}	Reißfelder	October 2, 1991	Tautenburg Observatory	L. D. Schmadel, F. Börngen	·	2.1 km	MPC · JPL
30852 Debye	1991 TR_{6}	Debye	October 2, 1991	Tautenburg Observatory	F. Börngen, L. D. Schmadel	·	2.0 km	MPC · JPL
30853	1991 UH_{3}	—	October 31, 1991	Kushiro	S. Ueda, H. Kaneda	·	5.7 km	MPC · JPL
30854	1991 VB	—	November 1, 1991	Palomar	E. F. Helin	·	870 m	MPC · JPL
30855	1991 VQ_{9}	—	November 4, 1991	Kitt Peak	Spacewatch	·	2.4 km	MPC · JPL
30856	1991 XE	—	December 7, 1991	Palomar	E. F. Helin	H	3.4 km	MPC · JPL
30857 Parsec	1991 YY	Parsec	December 31, 1991	Haute Provence	E. W. Elst	·	2.8 km	MPC · JPL
30858	1992 AU_{1}	—	January 9, 1992	Palomar	E. F. Helin	PHO	4.2 km	MPC · JPL
30859	1992 BM	—	January 28, 1992	Kushiro	S. Ueda, H. Kaneda	·	2.9 km	MPC · JPL
30860	1992 DA_{4}	—	February 29, 1992	Kitt Peak	Spacewatch	·	2.9 km	MPC · JPL
30861	1992 DS_{5}	—	February 29, 1992	La Silla	UESAC	THM	6.2 km	MPC · JPL
30862	1992 DF_{10}	—	February 29, 1992	La Silla	UESAC	(2076)	4.4 km	MPC · JPL
30863	1992 EA_{4}	—	March 1, 1992	La Silla	UESAC	NYS	3.6 km	MPC · JPL
30864	1992 EE_{6}	—	March 1, 1992	La Silla	UESAC	V	2.0 km	MPC · JPL
30865	1992 EH_{8}	—	March 2, 1992	La Silla	UESAC	·	4.1 km	MPC · JPL
30866	1992 EN_{8}	—	March 2, 1992	La Silla	UESAC	·	9.0 km	MPC · JPL
30867	1992 EL_{9}	—	March 2, 1992	La Silla	UESAC	·	7.0 km	MPC · JPL
30868	1992 ET_{10}	—	March 6, 1992	La Silla	UESAC	·	8.3 km	MPC · JPL
30869	1992 EU_{11}	—	March 6, 1992	La Silla	UESAC	·	2.5 km	MPC · JPL
30870	1992 EW_{15}	—	March 1, 1992	La Silla	UESAC	·	7.6 km	MPC · JPL
30871	1992 EG_{16}	—	March 1, 1992	La Silla	UESAC	·	5.8 km	MPC · JPL
30872	1992 EM_{17}	—	March 2, 1992	La Silla	UESAC	·	3.1 km	MPC · JPL
30873	1992 EN_{17}	—	March 2, 1992	La Silla	UESAC	NYS	2.1 km	MPC · JPL
30874	1992 EA_{23}	—	March 1, 1992	La Silla	UESAC	·	3.2 km	MPC · JPL
30875	1992 EX_{25}	—	March 8, 1992	La Silla	UESAC	THM	8.1 km	MPC · JPL
30876	1992 EM_{27}	—	March 4, 1992	La Silla	UESAC	·	7.2 km	MPC · JPL
30877	1992 ES_{30}	—	March 1, 1992	La Silla	UESAC	·	10 km	MPC · JPL
30878	1992 GQ	—	April 3, 1992	Kushiro	S. Ueda, H. Kaneda	·	9.7 km	MPC · JPL
30879 Hiroshikanai	1992 KF	Hiroshikanai	May 25, 1992	Geisei	T. Seki	EUN	6.0 km	MPC · JPL
30880	1992 PC_{2}	—	August 2, 1992	Palomar	H. E. Holt	·	5.0 km	MPC · JPL
30881 Robertstevenson	1992 RS_{4}	Robertstevenson	September 2, 1992	La Silla	E. W. Elst	·	3.0 km	MPC · JPL
30882 Tomhenning	1992 SG_{2}	Tomhenning	September 21, 1992	Tautenburg Observatory	L. D. Schmadel, F. Börngen	EUN	6.3 km	MPC · JPL
30883 de Broglie	1992 SW_{16}	de Broglie	September 24, 1992	Tautenburg Observatory	F. Börngen, L. D. Schmadel	·	3.7 km	MPC · JPL
30884	1992 SL_{23}	—	September 30, 1992	Palomar	H. E. Holt	EUN	4.9 km	MPC · JPL
30885	1992 UU_{4}	—	October 30, 1992	Yakiimo	Natori, A., T. Urata	·	6.1 km	MPC · JPL
30886 Hayashitadashi	1992 WJ_{1}	Hayashitadashi	November 17, 1992	Kitami	K. Endate, K. Watanabe	EUN · slow	5.6 km	MPC · JPL
30887	1992 WL_{2}	—	November 18, 1992	Kushiro	S. Ueda, H. Kaneda	EUN	6.2 km	MPC · JPL
30888 Okitsumisaki	1993 BG_{2}	Okitsumisaki	January 19, 1993	Geisei	T. Seki	·	9.2 km	MPC · JPL
30889	1993 FU_{6}	—	March 17, 1993	La Silla	UESAC	KOR	4.7 km	MPC · JPL
30890	1993 FB_{9}	—	March 17, 1993	La Silla	UESAC	·	11 km	MPC · JPL
30891	1993 FV_{14}	—	March 17, 1993	La Silla	UESAC	·	2.6 km	MPC · JPL
30892	1993 FR_{18}	—	March 17, 1993	La Silla	UESAC	·	5.0 km	MPC · JPL
30893	1993 FD_{19}	—	March 17, 1993	La Silla	UESAC	·	2.1 km	MPC · JPL
30894	1993 FD_{20}	—	March 17, 1993	La Silla	UESAC	·	2.3 km	MPC · JPL
30895	1993 FH_{23}	—	March 21, 1993	La Silla	UESAC	·	3.2 km	MPC · JPL
30896	1993 FX_{26}	—	March 21, 1993	La Silla	UESAC	·	6.4 km	MPC · JPL
30897	1993 FG_{29}	—	March 21, 1993	La Silla	UESAC	·	5.7 km	MPC · JPL
30898	1993 FJ_{29}	—	March 21, 1993	La Silla	UESAC	·	2.8 km	MPC · JPL
30899	1993 FL_{32}	—	March 21, 1993	La Silla	UESAC	·	6.4 km	MPC · JPL
30900	1993 FM_{34}	—	March 17, 1993	La Silla	UESAC	HYG	7.5 km	MPC · JPL

== 30901–31000 ==
back to top

Designation			Discovery			Properties		Ref
Permanent	Provisional	Named after	Date	Site	Discoverer(s)	Category	Diam.	Ref
30901	1993 FU_{34}	—	March 19, 1993	La Silla	UESAC	·	1.6 km	MPC · JPL
30902	1993 FF_{35}	—	March 19, 1993	La Silla	UESAC	·	5.9 km	MPC · JPL
30903	1993 FU_{37}	—	March 19, 1993	La Silla	UESAC	·	4.3 km	MPC · JPL
30904	1993 FV_{41}	—	March 19, 1993	La Silla	UESAC	·	7.7 km	MPC · JPL
30905	1993 FC_{42}	—	March 19, 1993	La Silla	UESAC	EOS	7.9 km	MPC · JPL
30906	1993 FV_{44}	—	March 19, 1993	La Silla	UESAC	THM	11 km	MPC · JPL
30907	1993 FD_{47}	—	March 19, 1993	La Silla	UESAC	THM	6.5 km	MPC · JPL
30908	1993 FW_{47}	—	March 19, 1993	La Silla	UESAC	HYG	8.5 km	MPC · JPL
30909	1993 FZ_{49}	—	March 19, 1993	La Silla	UESAC	·	1.7 km	MPC · JPL
30910	1993 FP_{52}	—	March 17, 1993	La Silla	UESAC	NYS	2.1 km	MPC · JPL
30911	1993 FY_{75}	—	March 21, 1993	La Silla	UESAC	·	2.3 km	MPC · JPL
30912	1993 FP_{76}	—	March 21, 1993	La Silla	UESAC	·	4.6 km	MPC · JPL
30913	1993 FO_{77}	—	March 21, 1993	La Silla	UESAC	·	7.8 km	MPC · JPL
30914	1993 FV_{82}	—	March 19, 1993	La Silla	UESAC	·	2.0 km	MPC · JPL
30915	1993 GF_{1}	—	April 15, 1993	Palomar	H. E. Holt	·	10 km	MPC · JPL
30916	1993 GN_{1}	—	April 14, 1993	La Silla	H. Debehogne	·	2.8 km	MPC · JPL
30917 Moehorgan	1993 HV_{1}	Moehorgan	April 19, 1993	McGraw-Hill	J. L. Tonry	·	5.8 km	MPC · JPL
30918	1993 KV_{2}	—	May 27, 1993	Caussols	E. W. Elst	·	1.8 km	MPC · JPL
30919	1993 NV_{1}	—	July 12, 1993	La Silla	E. W. Elst	·	3.0 km	MPC · JPL
30920	1993 OV_{4}	—	July 20, 1993	La Silla	E. W. Elst	·	3.3 km	MPC · JPL
30921	1993 OG_{6}	—	July 20, 1993	La Silla	E. W. Elst	·	3.3 km	MPC · JPL
30922	1993 OE_{13}	—	July 19, 1993	La Silla	E. W. Elst	·	2.8 km	MPC · JPL
30923	1993 QU_{4}	—	August 18, 1993	Caussols	E. W. Elst	·	4.5 km	MPC · JPL
30924 Imamura	1993 RC_{2}	Imamura	September 15, 1993	Kitami	K. Endate, K. Watanabe	·	3.7 km	MPC · JPL
30925 Todahiroyuki	1993 RD_{2}	Todahiroyuki	September 15, 1993	Kitami	K. Endate, K. Watanabe	MAR	5.8 km	MPC · JPL
30926	1993 TL_{13}	—	October 14, 1993	Palomar	H. E. Holt	·	3.4 km	MPC · JPL
30927	1993 TF_{17}	—	October 9, 1993	La Silla	E. W. Elst	·	2.4 km	MPC · JPL
30928 Jefferson	1993 TJ_{32}	Jefferson	October 9, 1993	La Silla	E. W. Elst	·	6.5 km	MPC · JPL
30929	1993 TR_{38}	—	October 9, 1993	La Silla	E. W. Elst	EUN	5.3 km	MPC · JPL
30930	1993 UF	—	October 20, 1993	Siding Spring	R. H. McNaught	PHO	3.1 km	MPC · JPL
30931	1993 UJ_{5}	—	October 20, 1993	La Silla	E. W. Elst	(5)	3.1 km	MPC · JPL
30932	1993 UO_{5}	—	October 20, 1993	La Silla	E. W. Elst	·	4.2 km	MPC · JPL
30933 Grillparzer	1993 UW_{8}	Grillparzer	October 17, 1993	Tautenburg Observatory	F. Börngen	·	4.0 km	MPC · JPL
30934 Bakerhansen	1993 WH	Bakerhansen	November 16, 1993	Palomar	C. S. Shoemaker, D. H. Levy	H	2.8 km	MPC · JPL
30935 Davasobel	1994 AK_{1}	Davasobel	January 8, 1994	Palomar	C. S. Shoemaker, D. H. Levy	H	2.4 km	MPC · JPL
30936 Basra	1994 BR_{3}	Basra	January 16, 1994	Caussols	E. W. Elst, C. Pollas	EUN	6.2 km	MPC · JPL
30937 Bashkirtseff	1994 BA_{4}	Bashkirtseff	January 16, 1994	Caussols	E. W. Elst, C. Pollas	(5)	4.3 km	MPC · JPL
30938 Montmartre	1994 BB_{4}	Montmartre	January 16, 1994	Caussols	E. W. Elst, C. Pollas	EUN	4.0 km	MPC · JPL
30939 Samaritaine	1994 BE_{4}	Samaritaine	January 16, 1994	Caussols	E. W. Elst, C. Pollas	EUN	4.9 km	MPC · JPL
30940	1994 CL_{2}	—	February 14, 1994	Oizumi	T. Kobayashi	·	4.8 km	MPC · JPL
30941	1994 CJ_{11}	—	February 7, 1994	La Silla	E. W. Elst	HNS	4.1 km	MPC · JPL
30942 Helicaon	1994 CX_{13}	Helicaon	February 8, 1994	La Silla	E. W. Elst	L5	33 km	MPC · JPL
30943 Takeisakiyo	1994 ED_{2}	Takeisakiyo	March 12, 1994	Kitami	K. Endate, K. Watanabe	·	10 km	MPC · JPL
30944 Hiruma	1994 GD_{1}	Hiruma	April 8, 1994	Kitami	K. Endate, K. Watanabe	·	9.4 km	MPC · JPL
30945	1994 GW_{9}	—	April 14, 1994	Lake Tekapo	A. C. Gilmore, P. M. Kilmartin	EOS	7.9 km	MPC · JPL
30946	1994 HB	—	April 19, 1994	Kitt Peak	Spacewatch	·	2.5 km	MPC · JPL
30947	1994 JW	—	May 4, 1994	Palomar	E. F. Helin	EUN	6.0 km	MPC · JPL
30948	1994 PU	—	August 14, 1994	Oizumi	T. Kobayashi	·	2.6 km	MPC · JPL
30949	1994 PF_{9}	—	August 10, 1994	La Silla	E. W. Elst	THM ·	7.8 km	MPC · JPL
30950	1994 PJ_{9}	—	August 10, 1994	La Silla	E. W. Elst	·	2.1 km	MPC · JPL
30951	1994 PL_{13}	—	August 10, 1994	La Silla	E. W. Elst	·	1.9 km	MPC · JPL
30952	1994 PX_{15}	—	August 10, 1994	La Silla	E. W. Elst	·	2.0 km	MPC · JPL
30953	1994 PZ_{17}	—	August 10, 1994	La Silla	E. W. Elst	·	6.6 km	MPC · JPL
30954	1994 PM_{28}	—	August 12, 1994	La Silla	E. W. Elst	·	1.7 km	MPC · JPL
30955 Weiser	1994 PG_{29}	Weiser	August 12, 1994	La Silla	E. W. Elst	·	17 km	MPC · JPL
30956	1994 QP	—	August 27, 1994	Siding Spring	G. J. Garradd	·	12 km	MPC · JPL
30957	1994 SQ_{7}	—	September 28, 1994	Kitt Peak	Spacewatch	·	1.9 km	MPC · JPL
30958	1994 TV_{3}	—	October 7, 1994	Palomar	E. F. Helin	H	1.9 km	MPC · JPL
30959	1994 TG_{9}	—	October 8, 1994	Kitt Peak	Spacewatch	·	1.8 km	MPC · JPL
30960	1994 UV_{2}	—	October 26, 1994	Kushiro	S. Ueda, H. Kaneda	·	2.2 km	MPC · JPL
30961	1994 VD_{1}	—	November 4, 1994	Oizumi	T. Kobayashi	·	2.9 km	MPC · JPL
30962	1994 VH_{7}	—	November 11, 1994	Nyukasa	M. Hirasawa, S. Suzuki	·	2.9 km	MPC · JPL
30963 Mount Banzan	1994 WO_{3}	Mount Banzan	November 29, 1994	Ayashi Station	M. Koishikawa	·	3.4 km	MPC · JPL
30964	1994 WW_{7}	—	November 28, 1994	Kitt Peak	Spacewatch	·	2.4 km	MPC · JPL
30965	1994 XW	—	December 2, 1994	Nachi-Katsuura	Y. Shimizu, T. Urata	BAP	3.4 km	MPC · JPL
30966	1994 XN_{1}	—	December 2, 1994	Farra d'Isonzo	Farra d'Isonzo	·	2.7 km	MPC · JPL
30967	1994 XX_{4}	—	December 9, 1994	Oizumi	T. Kobayashi	V	3.2 km	MPC · JPL
30968	1995 AM_{1}	—	January 6, 1995	Nyukasa	M. Hirasawa, S. Suzuki	PHO	3.1 km	MPC · JPL
30969	1995 BP_{2}	—	January 29, 1995	Siding Spring	R. H. McNaught	·	6.1 km	MPC · JPL
30970	1995 BP_{3}	—	January 31, 1995	Oizumi	T. Kobayashi	·	4.8 km	MPC · JPL
30971	1995 DJ	—	February 21, 1995	Oizumi	T. Kobayashi	·	6.3 km	MPC · JPL
30972	1995 DE_{8}	—	February 24, 1995	Kitt Peak	Spacewatch	·	2.8 km	MPC · JPL
30973	1995 DS_{8}	—	February 24, 1995	Kitt Peak	Spacewatch	NYS	2.0 km	MPC · JPL
30974	1995 EL	—	March 5, 1995	Oizumi	T. Kobayashi	DOR	9.6 km	MPC · JPL
30975	1995 EM	—	March 6, 1995	Oizumi	T. Kobayashi	·	3.1 km	MPC · JPL
30976	1995 FH_{1}	—	March 28, 1995	Kushiro	S. Ueda, H. Kaneda	EUN	4.9 km	MPC · JPL
30977	1995 JJ_{1}	—	May 5, 1995	Caussols	E. W. Elst	NYS	3.4 km	MPC · JPL
30978	1995 MO_{5}	—	June 23, 1995	Kitt Peak	Spacewatch	·	4.8 km	MPC · JPL
30979	1995 OB_{5}	—	July 22, 1995	Kitt Peak	Spacewatch	(3460)	8.0 km	MPC · JPL
30980	1995 QU_{3}	—	August 31, 1995	Catalina Station	T. B. Spahr	T_{j} (2.97)	14 km	MPC · JPL
30981	1995 SJ_{4}	—	September 25, 1995	Catalina Station	T. B. Spahr	·	14 km	MPC · JPL
30982	1995 SP_{5}	—	September 21, 1995	Xinglong	SCAP	THM	11 km	MPC · JPL
30983	1995 SE_{16}	—	September 18, 1995	Kitt Peak	Spacewatch	HYG	6.9 km	MPC · JPL
30984	1995 SW_{19}	—	September 18, 1995	Kitt Peak	Spacewatch	THM	8.5 km	MPC · JPL
30985	1995 SM_{24}	—	September 19, 1995	Kitt Peak	Spacewatch	·	6.4 km	MPC · JPL
30986	1995 SC_{28}	—	September 20, 1995	Kitt Peak	Spacewatch	·	8.9 km	MPC · JPL
30987	1995 SO_{34}	—	September 22, 1995	Kitt Peak	Spacewatch	·	5.5 km	MPC · JPL
30988	1995 SE_{36}	—	September 23, 1995	Kitt Peak	Spacewatch	·	3.7 km	MPC · JPL
30989	1995 SZ_{43}	—	September 25, 1995	Kitt Peak	Spacewatch	·	12 km	MPC · JPL
30990	1995 ST_{48}	—	September 26, 1995	Kitt Peak	Spacewatch	·	7.0 km	MPC · JPL
30991 Minenze	1995 SV_{53}	Minenze	September 28, 1995	Xinglong	SCAP	KOR	4.3 km	MPC · JPL
30992	1995 SV_{66}	—	September 17, 1995	Kitt Peak	Spacewatch	·	5.0 km	MPC · JPL
30993	1995 SA_{81}	—	September 30, 1995	Kitt Peak	Spacewatch	·	8.0 km	MPC · JPL
30994	1995 UE_{2}	—	October 24, 1995	Sudbury	D. di Cicco	·	7.6 km	MPC · JPL
30995	1995 UZ_{3}	—	October 20, 1995	Oizumi	T. Kobayashi	·	11 km	MPC · JPL
30996	1995 UH_{4}	—	October 20, 1995	Oohira	T. Urata	·	5.5 km	MPC · JPL
30997	1995 UO_{5}	—	October 26, 1995	Kitt Peak	Spacewatch	APO +1km	1.2 km	MPC · JPL
30998	1995 UF_{11}	—	October 17, 1995	Kitt Peak	Spacewatch	VER	6.6 km	MPC · JPL
30999	1995 UJ_{31}	—	October 21, 1995	Kitt Peak	Spacewatch	·	3.8 km	MPC · JPL
31000 Rockchic	1995 VV	Rockchic	November 11, 1995	Haleakala	AMOS	·	7.9 km	MPC · JPL

back to top

== See also ==
- Meanings of minor-planet names: 30001–31000
