= 9950 ESA =

Asteroid

- Animated orbit of 9950 ESA

Discovery
- Discovered by: C. Pollas
- Discovery site: Caussols Obs. (010)
- Discovery date: 8 November 1990

Designations
- Named after: European Space Agency
- Alternative designations: 1990 VB
- Minor planet category: NEO · Amor; Mars-crosser

Orbital characteristics
- Epoch 4 September 2017 (JD 2458000.5)
- Uncertainty parameter 0
- Observation arc: 26.90 yr (9,824 days)
- Aphelion: 3.7367 AU
- Perihelion: 1.1391 AU
- Semi-major axis: 2.4379 AU
- Eccentricity: 0.5328
- Orbital period (sidereal): 3.81 yr (1,390 days)
- Mean anomaly: 17.795°
- Mean motion: 0° 15^{m} 32.04^{s} / day
- Inclination: 14.597°
- Longitude of ascending node: 253.51°
- Argument of perihelion: 103.57°
- Earth MOID: 0.2806 AU · 109.3 LD

Physical characteristics
- Dimensions: 1.71 km (calculated); 3 km (estimated)
- Synodic rotation period: 6.707±0.002 h (Note: Stephens (2013) lightcurve plot of (9950) ESA rotation period 6.707±0.002 hours with a brightness amplitude of 0.44±0.02 mag. Quality code: 3. Summary figures at the Center for Solar System Studies and at the LCDB); 6.7078±0.0007 h 6.712±0.005 h (Note: Warner (2013) lightcurve plot of (9950) ESA rotation period 6.712±0.005 hours with a brightness amplitude of 0.56±0.03 mag. Quality code: 3. Summary figures at the Center for Solar System Studies and at the LCDB)
- Geometric albedo: 0.20 (assumed)
- Spectral type: S (assumed)
- Absolute magnitude (H): 16.2

9950 ESA, provisional designation 1990 VB, is an eccentric asteroid and elongated near-Earth object of the Amor group, approximately 1.7 kilometers in diameter. It was discovered on 8 November 1990, by French astronomer Christian Pollas at the Centre de recherches en géodynamique et astrométrie (Cerga) at Caussols in southeastern France. It was named for the European Space Agency (ESA).

== Orbit and classification ==
ESA is an Amor asteroid – a subgroup of near-Earth asteroids that approach the orbit of Earth from beyond, but do not cross it. It orbits the Sun at a distance of 1.1–3.7 AU once every 3 years and 10 months (1,390 days). Its orbit has an eccentricity of 0.53 and an inclination of 15° with respect to the ecliptic. The body's observation arc begins with its official discovery observation at Caussols in November 1990.

=== Close approaches ===
ESA has an Earth minimum orbit intersection distance of 0.2806 AU (42,000,000 km), which corresponds to 109.3 lunar distances. It approached the Earth at 0.393 AU on 18 October 1990, three weeks prior to its discovery, and made two more close approaches in August and September 2013, respectively. Its next close encounter with Earth will be in October 2032, at distance of 0.3043 AU (45,500,000 km).

The eccentric asteroid is also a Mars-crosser. In March 1987, it approached the Red Planet at 0.0990 AU (14,800,000 km).

== Physical characteristics ==
ESA is an assumed stony S-type asteroid.

=== Rotation period ===
In 2013, three rotational lightcurves of ESA were obtained from photometric observations by the EURONEAR Lightcurve Survey and by American astronomers Brian Warner and Robert Stephens at the Center for Solar System Studies (U81/U82). Lightcurve analysis gave a rotation period between 6.707 and 6.712 hours with a brightness variation of 0.44 to 0.89 magnitude (U=3/3/3-). A high brightness amplitude typically indicates that the body's shape is irregular and elongated, rather than spherical.

=== Diameter and albedo ===
In the early 1990s, David Tholen at the Institute for Astronomy of the University of Hawaii estimated a diameter of 3 kilometers for ESA. The Collaborative Asteroid Lightcurve Link assumes a standard albedo for stony asteroids of 0.20 and calculates a diameter of 1.71 kilometers based on an absolute magnitude of 16.2.

== Naming ==
This minor planet was named after the European Space Agency (ESA), which formed in 1974. The name was suggested by French astronomer Jean Louis Heudier, after whom the asteroid 4602 Heudier was named. The official naming citation was published by the Minor Planet Center on 15 December 2005 (M.P.C. 55720).
