= Christian Pollas =

French astronomer

Asteroids discovered: 26
see § List of discovered minor planets

Christian Pollas (born 1947) is a French astronomer, known for the discovery and observation of minor planets and supernovae.

Pollas is credited by the Minor Planet Center with the discovery of 26 asteroids, some co-discovered with Eric Elst, including near-Earth asteroids: (65679) 1989 UQ (belonging to the Aten group of asteroids), 4179 Toutatis (belonging to the Apollo group of asteroids) and 9950 ESA (belonging to the Amor group of asteroids).

The main-belt asteroid 4892 Chrispollas is named in his honor.

== List of discovered minor planets ==
4179 Toutatis	January 4, 1989
5164 Mullo	November 20, 1984
7296 Lamarck^{[1]}	August 8, 1992
8009 Béguin	January 25, 1989
9950 ESA	November 8, 1990
14015 Senancour^{[1]}	January 16, 1994
14016 Steller^{[1]}	January 16, 1994
(16403) 1984 WJ_{1}	November 20, 1984
16674 Birkeland^{[1]}	January 16, 1994
(17562) 1994 BG_{4}^{[1]}	January 16, 1994
(19241) 1994 BH_{4}^{[1]}	January 16, 1994
29311 Lesire^{[1]}	January 16, 1994
30936 Basra^{[1]}	January 16, 1994
30937 Bashkirtseff^{[1]}	January 16, 1994

30938 Montmartre^{[1]}	January 16, 1994
30939 Samaritaine^{[1]}	January 16, 1994
(32772) 1986 JL	May 11, 1986
(37644) 1994 BN_{3}^{[1]}	January 16, 1994
(42501) 1992 YC	December 17, 1992
(42521) 1994 BO_{3}^{[1]}	January 16, 1994
(43846) 1993 PV_{8}^{[1]}	August 15, 1993
(48564) 1994 BL_{3}^{[1]}	January 16, 1994
(52413) 1994 BF_{4}^{[1]}	January 16, 1994
(65679) 1989 UQ	October 26, 1989
(136745) 1995 WL_{8}	November 29, 1995
(173134) 1994 YP_{2}	December 27, 1994
^{1} co-discovery with E. W. Elst
