= Tomimaru Okuni =

Japanese amateur astronomer

Minor planets discovered: 130
see § List of discovered minor planets

Tomimaru Okuni (大国 富丸, Ōkuni Tomimaru; born 1931) is a Japanese amateur astronomer and a discoverer of minor planets at the Nanyo Observatory (358), Yamagata prefecture, Japan.

He is a prolific discoverer of asteroids, credited by the Minor Planet Center with a total of 130 discoveries between 1995 and 2000.

The main-belt asteroid 7769 Okuni, discovered by Satoru Otomo at the Kiyosato Observatory in 1991, is named in his honour. Naming citation was published on 9 January 2001 (M.P.C. 41935).

== List of discovered minor planets ==
7039 Yamagata	14 April 1996	list
8220 Nanyou	13 May 1996	list
8418 Mogamigawa	10 November 1996	list
8723 Azumayama	23 September 1996	list
8730 Iidesan	10 November 1996	list
8747 Asahi	24 March 1998	list
8922 Kumanodake	10 November 1996	list
8937 Gassan	13 January 1997	list
9110 Choukai	13 January 1997	list
9128 Takatumuzi	30 April 1998	list
9990 Niiyaeki	30 September 1997	list
10405 Yoshiaki	19 November 1997	list
10583 Kanetugu	21 November 1995	list
10864 Yamagatashi	31 August 1995	list
10886 Mitsuroohba	10 November 1996	list
11119 Taro	9 August 1996	list
11623 Kagekatu	8 October 1996	list
11752 Masatakesagai	23 July 1999	list
12003 Hideosugai	20 March 1996	list
12400 Katumaru	28 July 1995	list
12439 Okasaki	15 February 1996	list
12445 Sirataka	24 April 1996	list
12478 Suzukiseiji	7 March 1997	list
12788 Shigeno	22 September 1995	list
12793 Hosinokokai	30 October 1995	list

13146 Yuriko	20 February 1995	list
(13199) 1997 EW_{25}	3 March 1997	list
13220 Kashiwagura	1 July 1997	list
13222 Ichikawakazuo	27 July 1997	list
13224 Takamatsuda	10 August 1997	list
13235 Isiguroyuki	30 April 1998	list
13365 Tenzinyama	26 October 1998	list
13624 Abeosamu	17 October 1995	list
13678 Shimada	6 July 1997	list
13679 Shinanogawa	29 July 1997	list
13686 Kongozan	30 August 1997	list
13787 Nagaishi	26 October 1998	list
14046 Keikai	17 November 1995	list
14515 Koichisato	21 April 1996	list
14551 Itagaki	22 October 1997	list
14962 Masanoriabe	9 October 1996	list
14963 Toshikazu	11 October 1996	list
15028 Soushiyou	26 October 1998	list
15387 Hanazukayama	30 September 1997	list
15840 Hiroshiendou	31 May 1995	list
15906 Yoshikaneda	30 September 1997	list
16261 Iidemachi	4 May 2000	list
16725 Toudono	15 February 1996	list
16736 Tongariyama	13 May 1996	list
(16764) 1996 TV_{14}	9 October 1996	list

17629 Koichisuzuki	21 April 1996	list
17645 Inarimori	9 October 1996	list
(17685) 1997 AJ_{19}	13 January 1997	list
(17948) 1999 JQ_{15}	12 May 1999	list
18461 Seiichikanno	17 August 1995	list
18818 Yasuhiko	21 June 1999	list
18840 Yoshioba	8 August 1999	list
19392 Oyamada	22 February 1998	list
19707 Tokunai	8 October 1999	list
20107 Nanyotenmondai	28 August 1995	list
20115 Niheihajime	12 November 1995	list
20204 Yuudurunosato	1 March 1997	list
21275 Tosiyasu	23 September 1996	list
21368 Shiodayama	6 June 1997	list
21460 Ryozo	30 April 1998	list
22490 Zigamiyama	11 April 1997	list
23727 Akihasan	30 April 1998	list
24910 Haruoando	14 February 1997	list
24940 Sankichiyama	1 May 1997	list
24965 Akayu	19 November 1997	list
26319 Miyauchi	26 October 1998	list
26919 Shoichimiyata	3 September 1996	list
27879 Shibata	15 February 1996	list
27955 Yasumasa	24 August 1997	list
29355 Siratakayama	28 August 1995	list

29362 Azumakofuzi	15 February 1996	list
29373 Hamanowa	14 April 1996	list
29394 Hirokohamanowa	12 July 1996	list
29404 Hikarusato	9 October 1996	list
29450 Tomohiroohno	28 August 1997	list
29905 Kunitaka	21 April 1999	list
31105 Oguniyamagata	27 July 1997	list
31152 Daishinsai	29 October 1997	list
32969 Motohikosato	6 August 1996	list
33056 Ogunimachi	29 October 1997	list
33553 Nagai	11 May 1999	list
35265 Takeosaitou	12 July 1996	list
35274 Kenziarino	7 September 1996	list
37720 Kawanishi	23 September 1996	list
39655 Muneharuasada	17 October 1995	list
39679 Nukuhiyama	19 July 1996	list
39686 Takeshihara	9 August 1996	list
39726 Hideyukitezuka	10 November 1996	list
40774 Iwaigame	11 October 1999	list
43889 Osawatakaomi	17 August 1995	list
43908 Hiraku	21 November 1995	list
43931 Yoshimi	9 August 1996	list
43998 Nanyoshino	28 August 1997	list
44011 Juubichi	29 October 1997	list
44013 Iidetenmomdai	1 November 1997	list

46689 Hakuryuko	13 January 1997	list
46727 Hidekimatsuyama	30 September 1997	list
46796 Mamigasakigawa	19 May 1998	list
48607 Yamagatatemodai	20 February 1995	list
48624 Sadayuki	4 August 1995	list
48756 Yoshiharukuni	11 April 1997	list
48807 Takahata	22 October 1997	list
54288 Daikikawasaki	4 May 2000	list
58569 Eboshiyamakouen	28 August 1997	list
58600 Iwamuroonsen	5 October 1997	list
(58618) 1997 UU_{21}	29 October 1997	list
65784 Naderayama	20 October 1995	list
(65869) 1997 SP_{17}	30 September 1997	list
69496 Zaoryuzan	13 January 1997	list
73819 Isaootuki	16 November 1995	list
73857 Hitaneichi	16 November 1996	list
85388 Sakazukiyama	11 August 1996	list
85400 Shiratakachu	8 October 1996	list
85401 Yamatenclub	9 October 1996	list
(90838) 1995 WD_{7}	21 November 1995	list
90953 Hideosaitou	7 November 1997	list
96348 Toshiyukimariko	7 October 1997	list
100433 Hyakusyuko	24 May 1996	list
(100463) 1996 TU_{14}	9 October 1996	list
(129541) 1996 PQ_{9}	9 August 1996	list

(129544) 1996 RE_{24}	7 September 1996	list
129550 Fukuten	9 October 1996	list
(129596) 1997 VR_{1}	2 November 1997	list
(175710) 1996 SK_{7}	23 September 1996	list
(356982) 1996 RG_{24}	7 September 1996	list

== See also ==
- List of minor planet discoverers § T. Okuni
