= List of minor planets: 29001–30000 =

The following is a partial list of minor planets, running from minor-planet number 29001 through 30000, inclusive. The primary data for this and other partial lists is based on JPL's "Small-Body Orbital Elements" and data available from the Minor Planet Center. Critical list information is also provided by the MPC, unless otherwise specified from Lowell Observatory. A detailed description of the table's columns and additional sources are given on the main page including a complete list of every page in this series, and a statistical break-up on the dynamical classification of minor planets.

Also see the summary list of all named bodies in numerical and alphabetical order, and the corresponding naming citations for the number range of this particular list. New namings may only be added to this list after official publication, as the preannouncement of names is condemned by the Working Group for Small Bodies Nomenclature of the International Astronomical Union.

Near-Earth obj.	MBA (inner)	MBA (outer)	Centaur
Mars-crosser	MBA (middle)	Jupiter trojan	Trans-Neptunian obj.
Unclassified

== 29001–29100 ==
Designation			Discovery			Properties		Ref
Permanent	Provisional	Named after	Date	Site	Discoverer(s)	Category	Diam.	Ref
29001	2615 P-L	—	September 24, 1960	Palomar	C. J. van Houten, I. van Houten-Groeneveld, T. Gehrels	MRX	3.3 km	MPC · JPL
29002	2708 P-L	—	September 24, 1960	Palomar	C. J. van Houten, I. van Houten-Groeneveld, T. Gehrels	·	4.7 km	MPC · JPL
29003	2760 P-L	—	September 24, 1960	Palomar	C. J. van Houten, I. van Houten-Groeneveld, T. Gehrels	·	4.3 km	MPC · JPL
29004	2767 P-L	—	September 24, 1960	Palomar	C. J. van Houten, I. van Houten-Groeneveld, T. Gehrels	THM	9.3 km	MPC · JPL
29005	2784 P-L	—	September 24, 1960	Palomar	C. J. van Houten, I. van Houten-Groeneveld, T. Gehrels	·	7.5 km	MPC · JPL
29006	3091 P-L	—	September 24, 1960	Palomar	C. J. van Houten, I. van Houten-Groeneveld, T. Gehrels	·	4.7 km	MPC · JPL
29007	4022 P-L	—	September 24, 1960	Palomar	C. J. van Houten, I. van Houten-Groeneveld, T. Gehrels	·	2.5 km	MPC · JPL
29008	4044 P-L	—	September 24, 1960	Palomar	C. J. van Houten, I. van Houten-Groeneveld, T. Gehrels	EOS	6.5 km	MPC · JPL
29009	4074 P-L	—	September 24, 1960	Palomar	C. J. van Houten, I. van Houten-Groeneveld, T. Gehrels	MAS	2.7 km	MPC · JPL
29010	4100 P-L	—	September 24, 1960	Palomar	C. J. van Houten, I. van Houten-Groeneveld, T. Gehrels	EUN	3.5 km	MPC · JPL
29011	4184 P-L	—	September 24, 1960	Palomar	C. J. van Houten, I. van Houten-Groeneveld, T. Gehrels	·	3.6 km	MPC · JPL
29012	4285 P-L	—	September 24, 1960	Palomar	C. J. van Houten, I. van Houten-Groeneveld, T. Gehrels	EOS	4.3 km	MPC · JPL
29013	4291 P-L	—	September 24, 1960	Palomar	C. J. van Houten, I. van Houten-Groeneveld, T. Gehrels	·	2.8 km	MPC · JPL
29014	4536 P-L	—	September 24, 1960	Palomar	C. J. van Houten, I. van Houten-Groeneveld, T. Gehrels	·	7.2 km	MPC · JPL
29015	4544 P-L	—	September 24, 1960	Palomar	C. J. van Houten, I. van Houten-Groeneveld, T. Gehrels	·	2.9 km	MPC · JPL
29016	4591 P-L	—	September 24, 1960	Palomar	C. J. van Houten, I. van Houten-Groeneveld, T. Gehrels	·	4.5 km	MPC · JPL
29017	4601 P-L	—	September 24, 1960	Palomar	C. J. van Houten, I. van Houten-Groeneveld, T. Gehrels	·	7.1 km	MPC · JPL
29018	6062 P-L	—	September 24, 1960	Palomar	C. J. van Houten, I. van Houten-Groeneveld, T. Gehrels	NYS ·	6.3 km	MPC · JPL
29019	6095 P-L	—	September 24, 1960	Palomar	C. J. van Houten, I. van Houten-Groeneveld, T. Gehrels	HYG · slow?	7.7 km	MPC · JPL
29020	6274 P-L	—	September 24, 1960	Palomar	C. J. van Houten, I. van Houten-Groeneveld, T. Gehrels	·	3.8 km	MPC · JPL
29021	6613 P-L	—	September 24, 1960	Palomar	C. J. van Houten, I. van Houten-Groeneveld, T. Gehrels	·	2.5 km	MPC · JPL
29022	6630 P-L	—	September 24, 1960	Palomar	C. J. van Houten, I. van Houten-Groeneveld, T. Gehrels	·	2.0 km	MPC · JPL
29023	6667 P-L	—	September 24, 1960	Palomar	C. J. van Houten, I. van Houten-Groeneveld, T. Gehrels	EOS	4.7 km	MPC · JPL
29024	6685 P-L	—	September 24, 1960	Palomar	C. J. van Houten, I. van Houten-Groeneveld, T. Gehrels	KOR	3.2 km	MPC · JPL
29025	6710 P-L	—	September 24, 1960	Palomar	C. J. van Houten, I. van Houten-Groeneveld, T. Gehrels	AGN	4.0 km	MPC · JPL
29026	6774 P-L	—	September 24, 1960	Palomar	C. J. van Houten, I. van Houten-Groeneveld, T. Gehrels	·	3.0 km	MPC · JPL
29027	7587 P-L	—	October 17, 1960	Palomar	C. J. van Houten, I. van Houten-Groeneveld, T. Gehrels	(5)	3.4 km	MPC · JPL
29028	9097 P-L	—	October 17, 1960	Palomar	C. J. van Houten, I. van Houten-Groeneveld, T. Gehrels	RAF	4.9 km	MPC · JPL
29029	9549 P-L	—	October 17, 1960	Palomar	C. J. van Houten, I. van Houten-Groeneveld, T. Gehrels	·	5.7 km	MPC · JPL
29030	1034 T-1	—	March 25, 1971	Palomar	C. J. van Houten, I. van Houten-Groeneveld, T. Gehrels	·	2.2 km	MPC · JPL
29031	1132 T-1	—	March 25, 1971	Palomar	C. J. van Houten, I. van Houten-Groeneveld, T. Gehrels	NYS	3.3 km	MPC · JPL
29032	2059 T-1	—	March 25, 1971	Palomar	C. J. van Houten, I. van Houten-Groeneveld, T. Gehrels	PHO	4.2 km	MPC · JPL
29033	2085 T-1	—	March 25, 1971	Palomar	C. J. van Houten, I. van Houten-Groeneveld, T. Gehrels	THM	8.6 km	MPC · JPL
29034	2149 T-1	—	March 25, 1971	Palomar	C. J. van Houten, I. van Houten-Groeneveld, T. Gehrels	·	13 km	MPC · JPL
29035	2214 T-1	—	March 25, 1971	Palomar	C. J. van Houten, I. van Houten-Groeneveld, T. Gehrels	·	4.5 km	MPC · JPL
29036	3075 T-1	—	March 26, 1971	Palomar	C. J. van Houten, I. van Houten-Groeneveld, T. Gehrels	THM	11 km	MPC · JPL
29037	3165 T-1	—	March 26, 1971	Palomar	C. J. van Houten, I. van Houten-Groeneveld, T. Gehrels	·	2.5 km	MPC · JPL
29038	4030 T-1	—	March 26, 1971	Palomar	C. J. van Houten, I. van Houten-Groeneveld, T. Gehrels	GEF · slow	5.0 km	MPC · JPL
29039	4514 T-1	—	May 13, 1971	Palomar	C. J. van Houten, I. van Houten-Groeneveld, T. Gehrels	·	4.8 km	MPC · JPL
29040	1002 T-2	—	September 29, 1973	Palomar	C. J. van Houten, I. van Houten-Groeneveld, T. Gehrels	·	2.7 km	MPC · JPL
29041	1050 T-2	—	September 29, 1973	Palomar	C. J. van Houten, I. van Houten-Groeneveld, T. Gehrels	·	8.2 km	MPC · JPL
29042	1426 T-2	—	September 29, 1973	Palomar	C. J. van Houten, I. van Houten-Groeneveld, T. Gehrels	·	7.5 km	MPC · JPL
29043	2024 T-2	—	September 29, 1973	Palomar	C. J. van Houten, I. van Houten-Groeneveld, T. Gehrels	GEF	4.7 km	MPC · JPL
29044	2154 T-2	—	September 29, 1973	Palomar	C. J. van Houten, I. van Houten-Groeneveld, T. Gehrels	·	2.9 km	MPC · JPL
29045	2255 T-2	—	September 29, 1973	Palomar	C. J. van Houten, I. van Houten-Groeneveld, T. Gehrels	·	2.6 km	MPC · JPL
29046	2268 T-2	—	September 29, 1973	Palomar	C. J. van Houten, I. van Houten-Groeneveld, T. Gehrels	HYG	5.7 km	MPC · JPL
29047	2278 T-2	—	September 29, 1973	Palomar	C. J. van Houten, I. van Houten-Groeneveld, T. Gehrels	·	5.8 km	MPC · JPL
29048	3069 T-2	—	September 30, 1973	Palomar	C. J. van Houten, I. van Houten-Groeneveld, T. Gehrels	·	3.4 km	MPC · JPL
29049	3083 T-2	—	September 30, 1973	Palomar	C. J. van Houten, I. van Houten-Groeneveld, T. Gehrels	·	2.0 km	MPC · JPL
29050	3333 T-2	—	September 25, 1973	Palomar	C. J. van Houten, I. van Houten-Groeneveld, T. Gehrels	KOR	3.1 km	MPC · JPL
29051	4212 T-2	—	September 29, 1973	Palomar	C. J. van Houten, I. van Houten-Groeneveld, T. Gehrels	·	3.5 km	MPC · JPL
29052	4258 T-2	—	September 29, 1973	Palomar	C. J. van Houten, I. van Houten-Groeneveld, T. Gehrels	·	3.0 km	MPC · JPL
29053 Muskau	4466 T-2	Muskau	September 30, 1973	Palomar	C. J. van Houten, I. van Houten-Groeneveld, T. Gehrels	3:2	10 km	MPC · JPL
29054	5097 T-2	—	September 25, 1973	Palomar	C. J. van Houten, I. van Houten-Groeneveld, T. Gehrels	(18466)	4.6 km	MPC · JPL
29055	5118 T-2	—	September 25, 1973	Palomar	C. J. van Houten, I. van Houten-Groeneveld, T. Gehrels	URS ·	6.0 km	MPC · JPL
29056	1055 T-3	—	October 17, 1977	Palomar	C. J. van Houten, I. van Houten-Groeneveld, T. Gehrels	·	3.3 km	MPC · JPL
29057	1083 T-3	—	October 17, 1977	Palomar	C. J. van Houten, I. van Houten-Groeneveld, T. Gehrels	(5)	2.4 km	MPC · JPL
29058	2077 T-3	—	October 16, 1977	Palomar	C. J. van Houten, I. van Houten-Groeneveld, T. Gehrels	·	4.7 km	MPC · JPL
29059	2151 T-3	—	October 16, 1977	Palomar	C. J. van Houten, I. van Houten-Groeneveld, T. Gehrels	·	2.9 km	MPC · JPL
29060	2157 T-3	—	October 16, 1977	Palomar	C. J. van Houten, I. van Houten-Groeneveld, T. Gehrels	·	3.3 km	MPC · JPL
29061	2193 T-3	—	October 16, 1977	Palomar	C. J. van Houten, I. van Houten-Groeneveld, T. Gehrels	·	3.0 km	MPC · JPL
29062	2324 T-3	—	October 16, 1977	Palomar	C. J. van Houten, I. van Houten-Groeneveld, T. Gehrels	·	2.2 km	MPC · JPL
29063	2369 T-3	—	October 16, 1977	Palomar	C. J. van Houten, I. van Houten-Groeneveld, T. Gehrels	·	2.1 km	MPC · JPL
29064	3129 T-3	—	October 16, 1977	Palomar	C. J. van Houten, I. van Houten-Groeneveld, T. Gehrels	·	3.6 km	MPC · JPL
29065	3447 T-3	—	October 16, 1977	Palomar	C. J. van Houten, I. van Houten-Groeneveld, T. Gehrels	·	2.6 km	MPC · JPL
29066	3527 T-3	—	October 16, 1977	Palomar	C. J. van Houten, I. van Houten-Groeneveld, T. Gehrels	V	1.5 km	MPC · JPL
29067	3856 T-3	—	October 16, 1977	Palomar	C. J. van Houten, I. van Houten-Groeneveld, T. Gehrels	·	6.0 km	MPC · JPL
29068	4234 T-3	—	October 16, 1977	Palomar	C. J. van Houten, I. van Houten-Groeneveld, T. Gehrels	PHO	2.8 km	MPC · JPL
29069	4310 T-3	—	October 16, 1977	Palomar	C. J. van Houten, I. van Houten-Groeneveld, T. Gehrels	·	3.0 km	MPC · JPL
29070	4316 T-3	—	October 16, 1977	Palomar	C. J. van Houten, I. van Houten-Groeneveld, T. Gehrels	·	3.1 km	MPC · JPL
29071	5048 T-3	—	October 16, 1977	Palomar	C. J. van Houten, I. van Houten-Groeneveld, T. Gehrels	CYB	11 km	MPC · JPL
29072	5089 T-3	—	October 16, 1977	Palomar	C. J. van Houten, I. van Houten-Groeneveld, T. Gehrels	·	2.0 km	MPC · JPL
29073	5130 T-3	—	October 16, 1977	Palomar	C. J. van Houten, I. van Houten-Groeneveld, T. Gehrels	·	2.0 km	MPC · JPL
29074	5160 T-3	—	October 16, 1977	Palomar	C. J. van Houten, I. van Houten-Groeneveld, T. Gehrels	·	4.3 km	MPC · JPL
29075	1950 DA	—	February 22, 1950	Mount Hamilton	C. A. Wirtanen	APO +1km · PHA · fast	1.3 km	MPC · JPL
29076	1972 TR_{8}	—	October 4, 1972	Hamburg-Bergedorf	L. Kohoutek	EUN	5.5 km	MPC · JPL
29077	1975 SR	—	September 30, 1975	Palomar	S. J. Bus	·	3.9 km	MPC · JPL
29078	1975 SX_{1}	—	September 30, 1975	Palomar	S. J. Bus	EOS	6.7 km	MPC · JPL
29079	1975 XD	—	December 1, 1975	Cerro El Roble	C. Torres, Barros, S.	V	2.2 km	MPC · JPL
29080 Astrocourier	1978 RK	Astrocourier	September 1, 1978	Nauchnij	N. S. Chernykh	(22805)	18 km	MPC · JPL
29081 Krymradio	1978 SC_{5}	Krymradio	September 27, 1978	Nauchnij	L. I. Chernykh	MAS	3.0 km	MPC · JPL
29082	1978 VG_{9}	—	November 7, 1978	Palomar	E. F. Helin, S. J. Bus	·	2.4 km	MPC · JPL
29083	1979 MG_{3}	—	June 25, 1979	Siding Spring	E. F. Helin, S. J. Bus	EOS	7.4 km	MPC · JPL
29084	1979 MD_{7}	—	June 25, 1979	Siding Spring	E. F. Helin, S. J. Bus	·	1.9 km	MPC · JPL
29085 Sethanne	1979 SD	Sethanne	September 17, 1979	Harvard Observatory	Harvard Observatory	·	3.3 km	MPC · JPL
29086	1980 PY_{2}	—	August 4, 1980	Siding Spring	Royal Observatory Edinburgh	slow	5.2 km	MPC · JPL
29087	1980 VW_{2}	—	November 1, 1980	Palomar	S. J. Bus	·	5.5 km	MPC · JPL
29088	1981 DR_{2}	—	February 28, 1981	Siding Spring	S. J. Bus	ADE	9.3 km	MPC · JPL
29089	1981 DD_{3}	—	February 28, 1981	Siding Spring	S. J. Bus	·	6.1 km	MPC · JPL
29090	1981 EY_{3}	—	March 2, 1981	Siding Spring	S. J. Bus	·	9.1 km	MPC · JPL
29091	1981 EF_{8}	—	March 1, 1981	Siding Spring	S. J. Bus	·	11 km	MPC · JPL
29092	1981 EL_{10}	—	March 1, 1981	Siding Spring	S. J. Bus	·	6.7 km	MPC · JPL
29093	1981 EQ_{10}	—	March 1, 1981	Siding Spring	S. J. Bus	·	1.6 km	MPC · JPL
29094	1981 ED_{11}	—	March 1, 1981	Siding Spring	S. J. Bus	·	3.8 km	MPC · JPL
29095	1981 EK_{11}	—	March 7, 1981	Siding Spring	S. J. Bus	·	3.4 km	MPC · JPL
29096	1981 EW_{11}	—	March 7, 1981	Siding Spring	S. J. Bus	·	2.4 km	MPC · JPL
29097	1981 EC_{12}	—	March 1, 1981	Siding Spring	S. J. Bus	·	3.3 km	MPC · JPL
29098	1981 EN_{16}	—	March 6, 1981	Siding Spring	S. J. Bus	·	3.0 km	MPC · JPL
29099	1981 EQ_{16}	—	March 6, 1981	Siding Spring	S. J. Bus	·	9.3 km	MPC · JPL
29100	1981 EE_{18}	—	March 2, 1981	Siding Spring	S. J. Bus	·	5.4 km	MPC · JPL

== 29101–29200 ==
back to top

Designation			Discovery			Properties		Ref
Permanent	Provisional	Named after	Date	Site	Discoverer(s)	Category	Diam.	Ref
29101	1981 EZ_{20}	—	March 2, 1981	Siding Spring	S. J. Bus	(12739)	4.7 km	MPC · JPL
29102	1981 EA_{22}	—	March 2, 1981	Siding Spring	S. J. Bus	·	7.6 km	MPC · JPL
29103	1981 EC_{22}	—	March 2, 1981	Siding Spring	S. J. Bus	·	1.8 km	MPC · JPL
29104	1981 EO_{22}	—	March 2, 1981	Siding Spring	S. J. Bus	·	2.2 km	MPC · JPL
29105	1981 EY_{22}	—	March 2, 1981	Siding Spring	S. J. Bus	·	1.6 km	MPC · JPL
29106	1981 EL_{25}	—	March 2, 1981	Siding Spring	S. J. Bus	V	1.8 km	MPC · JPL
29107	1981 EO_{25}	—	March 2, 1981	Siding Spring	S. J. Bus	·	10 km	MPC · JPL
29108	1981 EG_{26}	—	March 2, 1981	Siding Spring	S. J. Bus	·	6.8 km	MPC · JPL
29109	1981 EO_{28}	—	March 6, 1981	Siding Spring	S. J. Bus	WIT ·	3.3 km	MPC · JPL
29110	1981 ET_{29}	—	March 1, 1981	Siding Spring	S. J. Bus	·	8.0 km	MPC · JPL
29111	1981 EC_{33}	—	March 1, 1981	Siding Spring	S. J. Bus	·	2.2 km	MPC · JPL
29112	1981 EZ_{33}	—	March 1, 1981	Siding Spring	S. J. Bus	·	6.2 km	MPC · JPL
29113	1981 EA_{34}	—	March 1, 1981	Siding Spring	S. J. Bus	·	4.3 km	MPC · JPL
29114	1981 EB_{34}	—	March 1, 1981	Siding Spring	S. J. Bus	·	1.3 km	MPC · JPL
29115	1981 EW_{38}	—	March 1, 1981	Siding Spring	S. J. Bus	·	4.2 km	MPC · JPL
29116	1981 ED_{40}	—	March 2, 1981	Siding Spring	S. J. Bus	·	7.3 km	MPC · JPL
29117	1981 EK_{40}	—	March 2, 1981	Siding Spring	S. J. Bus	NEM	6.4 km	MPC · JPL
29118	1981 EQ_{43}	—	March 3, 1981	Siding Spring	S. J. Bus	MAS	1.4 km	MPC · JPL
29119	1981 EW_{45}	—	March 1, 1981	Siding Spring	S. J. Bus	HYG	7.8 km	MPC · JPL
29120	1981 EY_{45}	—	March 1, 1981	Siding Spring	S. J. Bus	·	7.8 km	MPC · JPL
29121	1981 QP_{2}	—	August 23, 1981	La Silla	H. Debehogne	·	2.3 km	MPC · JPL
29122 Vasadze	1982 YR_{1}	Vasadze	December 24, 1982	Nauchnij	L. G. Karachkina	·	4.1 km	MPC · JPL
29123	1983 RA_{4}	—	September 2, 1983	Anderson Mesa	N. G. Thomas	·	5.5 km	MPC · JPL
29124	1984 SW_{6}	—	September 28, 1984	La Silla	H. Debehogne	·	2.0 km	MPC · JPL
29125 Kyivphysfak	1984 YL_{1}	Kyivphysfak	December 17, 1984	Nauchnij	L. G. Karachkina	·	3.4 km	MPC · JPL
29126	1985 CU_{1}	—	February 11, 1985	La Silla	H. Debehogne	PHO	3.6 km	MPC · JPL
29127 Karnath	1985 FF_{2}	Karnath	March 24, 1985	Anderson Mesa	B. A. Skiff	·	11 km	MPC · JPL
29128	1985 RA_{1}	—	September 13, 1985	Kitt Peak	Spacewatch	·	4.1 km	MPC · JPL
29129	1985 RG_{3}	—	September 6, 1985	La Silla	H. Debehogne	·	5.8 km	MPC · JPL
29130	1986 EA_{5}	—	March 9, 1986	Siding Spring	C.-I. Lagerkvist	·	8.6 km	MPC · JPL
29131	1986 QU_{1}	—	August 27, 1986	La Silla	H. Debehogne	MAS	2.4 km	MPC · JPL
29132 Bradpitt	1987 BP_{1}	Bradpitt	January 22, 1987	La Silla	E. W. Elst	·	3.1 km	MPC · JPL
29133 Vargas	1987 KH_{5}	Vargas	May 29, 1987	Palomar	C. S. Shoemaker, E. M. Shoemaker	EUN · fast	4.7 km	MPC · JPL
29134	1987 RW	—	September 12, 1987	La Silla	H. Debehogne	BAP	4.6 km	MPC · JPL
29135	1987 SZ_{2}	—	September 21, 1987	Smolyan	E. W. Elst	·	2.6 km	MPC · JPL
29136	1987 SQ_{4}	—	September 25, 1987	Brorfelde	P. Jensen	·	3.4 km	MPC · JPL
29137 Alanboss	1987 UY_{1}	Alanboss	October 18, 1987	Palomar	C. S. Shoemaker, E. M. Shoemaker	PHO	2.5 km	MPC · JPL
29138	1988 BE_{4}	—	January 20, 1988	La Silla	H. Debehogne	slow	6.5 km	MPC · JPL
29139	1988 CP	—	February 15, 1988	Kushiro	S. Ueda, H. Kaneda	PHO	7.1 km	MPC · JPL
29140	1988 CG_{4}	—	February 13, 1988	La Silla	E. W. Elst	V	2.4 km	MPC · JPL
29141	1988 CZ_{4}	—	February 13, 1988	La Silla	E. W. Elst	·	3.7 km	MPC · JPL
29142	1988 CR_{7}	—	February 15, 1988	La Silla	E. W. Elst	MAS	3.0 km	MPC · JPL
29143	1988 DK	—	February 22, 1988	Siding Spring	R. H. McNaught	·	5.2 km	MPC · JPL
29144 Taitokufuji	1988 FB	Taitokufuji	March 16, 1988	Kushiro	Matsuyama, M., K. Watanabe	NYS	3.7 km	MPC · JPL
29145	1988 FE	—	March 16, 1988	Kushiro	S. Ueda, H. Kaneda	·	4.2 km	MPC · JPL
29146 McHone	1988 FN	McHone	March 17, 1988	Palomar	C. S. Shoemaker, E. M. Shoemaker	PHO	3.8 km	MPC · JPL
29147	1988 GG	—	April 11, 1988	Kushiro	S. Ueda, H. Kaneda	PHO	4.3 km	MPC · JPL
29148 Palzer	1988 JE	Palzer	May 10, 1988	La Silla	W. Landgraf	·	10 km	MPC · JPL
29149	1988 RE_{1}	—	September 9, 1988	Brorfelde	P. Jensen	MAR	5.1 km	MPC · JPL
29150	1988 RM_{5}	—	September 2, 1988	La Silla	H. Debehogne	MAR	4.8 km	MPC · JPL
29151	1988 RE_{11}	—	September 14, 1988	Cerro Tololo	S. J. Bus	·	8.5 km	MPC · JPL
29152	1988 RA_{13}	—	September 14, 1988	Cerro Tololo	S. J. Bus	·	2.6 km	MPC · JPL
29153	1988 SY_{2}	—	September 16, 1988	Cerro Tololo	S. J. Bus	·	3.6 km	MPC · JPL
29154	1988 VC_{1}	—	November 3, 1988	Brorfelde	P. Jensen	EUN	4.1 km	MPC · JPL
29155	1988 XE	—	December 2, 1988	Kushiro	S. Ueda, H. Kaneda	·	10 km	MPC · JPL
29156	1989 CH	—	February 3, 1989	Kushiro	S. Ueda, H. Kaneda	·	7.1 km	MPC · JPL
29157 Higashinihon	1989 ET_{1}	Higashinihon	March 11, 1989	Geisei	T. Seki	(2076)	3.2 km	MPC · JPL
29158	1989 EE_{3}	—	March 2, 1989	La Silla	E. W. Elst	fast	4.9 km	MPC · JPL
29159 Asakawa	1989 GB	Asakawa	April 2, 1989	Kitami	T. Fujii, K. Watanabe	PHO	6.8 km	MPC · JPL
29160 São Paulo	1989 SP_{1}	São Paulo	September 26, 1989	La Silla	E. W. Elst	·	4.8 km	MPC · JPL
29161	1989 SF_{2}	—	September 26, 1989	La Silla	E. W. Elst	·	7.7 km	MPC · JPL
29162	1989 SD_{4}	—	September 26, 1989	La Silla	E. W. Elst	MAR	5.1 km	MPC · JPL
29163	1989 SF_{14}	—	September 26, 1989	Calar Alto	J. M. Baur, K. Birkle	MAR	2.8 km	MPC · JPL
29164	1989 UA	—	October 20, 1989	Kani	Y. Mizuno, T. Furuta	·	7.3 km	MPC · JPL
29165	1989 UK_{1}	—	October 26, 1989	Kushiro	S. Ueda, H. Kaneda	·	3.4 km	MPC · JPL
29166	1989 VP_{1}	—	November 3, 1989	La Silla	E. W. Elst	EUN	3.4 km	MPC · JPL
29167 Masataka	1989 WC_{2}	Masataka	November 29, 1989	Kitami	K. Endate, K. Watanabe	·	5.7 km	MPC · JPL
29168	1990 KJ	—	May 20, 1990	Palomar	E. F. Helin	PHO	4.9 km	MPC · JPL
29169	1990 OC_{1}	—	July 22, 1990	Palomar	E. F. Helin	·	8.0 km	MPC · JPL
29170	1990 OA_{3}	—	July 27, 1990	Palomar	H. E. Holt	EOS	7.2 km	MPC · JPL
29171	1990 QK_{3}	—	August 28, 1990	Palomar	H. E. Holt	·	3.1 km	MPC · JPL
29172	1990 QL_{4}	—	August 23, 1990	Palomar	H. E. Holt	EOS	8.0 km	MPC · JPL
29173	1990 QW_{4}	—	August 24, 1990	Palomar	H. E. Holt	·	2.8 km	MPC · JPL
29174	1990 QJ_{6}	—	August 20, 1990	La Silla	E. W. Elst	·	8.4 km	MPC · JPL
29175	1990 QP_{6}	—	August 20, 1990	La Silla	E. W. Elst	(2076)	2.8 km	MPC · JPL
29176	1990 QJ_{10}	—	August 16, 1990	La Silla	E. W. Elst	·	6.1 km	MPC · JPL
29177	1990 RF_{7}	—	September 13, 1990	La Silla	H. Debehogne	THM	9.1 km	MPC · JPL
29178	1990 RW_{8}	—	September 13, 1990	Palomar	H. E. Holt	·	3.0 km	MPC · JPL
29179	1990 RT_{13}	—	September 14, 1990	La Silla	E. W. Elst	·	2.3 km	MPC · JPL
29180	1990 SW_{1}	—	September 22, 1990	Palomar	B. Roman	·	5.2 km	MPC · JPL
29181	1990 SE_{6}	—	September 22, 1990	La Silla	E. W. Elst	V	2.0 km	MPC · JPL
29182	1990 ST_{6}	—	September 22, 1990	La Silla	E. W. Elst	·	7.6 km	MPC · JPL
29183	1990 SQ_{7}	—	September 22, 1990	La Silla	E. W. Elst	NYS	3.2 km	MPC · JPL
29184	1990 SL_{10}	—	September 17, 1990	Palomar	C. M. Olmstead	PHO	4.8 km	MPC · JPL
29185 Reich	1990 TG_{8}	Reich	October 13, 1990	Tautenburg Observatory	L. D. Schmadel, F. Börngen	TIR	10 km	MPC · JPL
29186 Lake Tekapo	1990 UD_{2}	Lake Tekapo	October 26, 1990	Geisei	T. Seki	V	2.6 km	MPC · JPL
29187 Le Monnier	1990 US_{3}	Le Monnier	October 16, 1990	La Silla	E. W. Elst	·	11 km	MPC · JPL
29188	1990 UW_{3}	—	October 16, 1990	La Silla	E. W. Elst	NYS ·	4.8 km	MPC · JPL
29189 Udinsk	1990 UY_{3}	Udinsk	October 16, 1990	La Silla	E. W. Elst	·	8.4 km	MPC · JPL
29190	1990 UZ_{4}	—	October 16, 1990	La Silla	E. W. Elst	·	11 km	MPC · JPL
29191	1990 UQ_{5}	—	October 16, 1990	La Silla	E. W. Elst	BAP	2.5 km	MPC · JPL
29192	1990 VK_{2}	—	November 11, 1990	Oohira	T. Urata	·	12 km	MPC · JPL
29193 Dolphyn	1990 WD_{1}	Dolphyn	November 18, 1990	La Silla	E. W. Elst	·	14 km	MPC · JPL
29194	1990 WJ_{4}	—	November 16, 1990	La Silla	E. W. Elst	V	2.7 km	MPC · JPL
29195	1990 WF_{5}	—	November 16, 1990	La Silla	E. W. Elst	·	3.9 km	MPC · JPL
29196 Dius	1990 YY	Dius	December 19, 1990	McGraw-Hill	R. P. Binzel	L5	16 km	MPC · JPL
29197 Gleim	1991 AQ_{2}	Gleim	January 15, 1991	Tautenburg Observatory	F. Börngen	·	2.5 km	MPC · JPL
29198 Weathers	1991 DW	Weathers	February 18, 1991	Palomar	E. F. Helin	MAR	5.7 km	MPC · JPL
29199 Himeji	1991 FZ	Himeji	March 17, 1991	Geisei	T. Seki	·	13 km	MPC · JPL
29200	1991 FX_{2}	—	March 20, 1991	La Silla	H. Debehogne	EUN	7.4 km	MPC · JPL

== 29201–29300 ==
back to top

Designation			Discovery			Properties		Ref
Permanent	Provisional	Named after	Date	Site	Discoverer(s)	Category	Diam.	Ref
29201	1991 GO_{4}	—	April 8, 1991	La Silla	E. W. Elst	·	12 km	MPC · JPL
29202	1991 GH_{8}	—	April 8, 1991	La Silla	E. W. Elst	ADE	9.6 km	MPC · JPL
29203 Schnitger	1991 GS_{10}	Schnitger	April 9, 1991	Tautenburg Observatory	F. Börngen	·	3.2 km	MPC · JPL
29204 Ladegast	1991 GB_{11}	Ladegast	April 11, 1991	Tautenburg Observatory	F. Börngen	·	3.5 km	MPC · JPL
29205	1991 NM_{6}	—	July 11, 1991	La Silla	H. Debehogne	PAD	9.2 km	MPC · JPL
29206	1991 PX_{10}	—	August 7, 1991	Palomar	H. E. Holt	·	2.7 km	MPC · JPL
29207	1991 RG_{2}	—	September 6, 1991	Haute Provence	E. W. Elst	·	2.6 km	MPC · JPL
29208 Halorentz	1991 RT_{2}	Halorentz	September 9, 1991	Tautenburg Observatory	F. Börngen, L. D. Schmadel	·	2.8 km	MPC · JPL
29209	1991 RV_{7}	—	September 12, 1991	Palomar	H. E. Holt	·	2.2 km	MPC · JPL
29210 Robertbrown	1991 RB_{12}	Robertbrown	September 4, 1991	La Silla	E. W. Elst	fast	9.1 km	MPC · JPL
29211	1991 RY_{15}	—	September 15, 1991	Palomar	H. E. Holt	KOR	6.0 km	MPC · JPL
29212 Zeeman	1991 RA_{41}	Zeeman	September 10, 1991	Tautenburg Observatory	F. Börngen	KOR	3.9 km	MPC · JPL
29213	1991 SJ	—	September 29, 1991	Siding Spring	R. H. McNaught	·	2.5 km	MPC · JPL
29214 Apitzsch	1991 TL_{6}	Apitzsch	October 2, 1991	Tautenburg Observatory	L. D. Schmadel, F. Börngen	·	4.8 km	MPC · JPL
29215	1991 UE	—	October 18, 1991	Kushiro	S. Ueda, H. Kaneda	·	5.1 km	MPC · JPL
29216	1991 VX_{5}	—	November 2, 1991	La Silla	E. W. Elst	EOS	10 km	MPC · JPL
29217	1991 VV_{12}	—	November 4, 1991	Kushiro	S. Ueda, H. Kaneda	·	8.6 km	MPC · JPL
29218	1992 AY	—	January 4, 1992	Okutama	Hioki, T., Hayakawa, S.	·	13 km	MPC · JPL
29219	1992 BJ	—	January 24, 1992	Kushiro	S. Ueda, H. Kaneda	·	6.3 km	MPC · JPL
29220 Xavierbaptista	1992 BC_{2}	Xavierbaptista	January 30, 1992	La Silla	E. W. Elst	·	7.3 km	MPC · JPL
29221	1992 BW_{3}	—	January 28, 1992	Kitt Peak	Spacewatch	(2076)	2.9 km	MPC · JPL
29222	1992 BU_{4}	—	January 29, 1992	Kitt Peak	Spacewatch	·	2.1 km	MPC · JPL
29223	1992 DW_{2}	—	February 23, 1992	Kitt Peak	Spacewatch	NYS	3.3 km	MPC · JPL
29224	1992 DD_{7}	—	February 29, 1992	La Silla	UESAC	·	2.9 km	MPC · JPL
29225	1992 DW_{7}	—	February 29, 1992	La Silla	UESAC	·	5.0 km	MPC · JPL
29226	1992 DH_{8}	—	February 29, 1992	La Silla	UESAC	·	5.6 km	MPC · JPL
29227 Wegener	1992 DY_{13}	Wegener	February 29, 1992	Tautenburg Observatory	F. Börngen	·	3.7 km	MPC · JPL
29228	1992 EC	—	March 2, 1992	Kushiro	S. Ueda, H. Kaneda	V	2.7 km	MPC · JPL
29229	1992 EE_{1}	—	March 10, 1992	Dynic	A. Sugie	PHO	4.3 km	MPC · JPL
29230	1992 ED_{4}	—	March 1, 1992	La Silla	UESAC	THM	11 km	MPC · JPL
29231	1992 EG_{4}	—	March 1, 1992	La Silla	UESAC	slow	8.0 km	MPC · JPL
29232	1992 EH_{4}	—	March 1, 1992	La Silla	UESAC	·	3.0 km	MPC · JPL
29233	1992 EP_{6}	—	March 1, 1992	La Silla	UESAC	·	3.3 km	MPC · JPL
29234	1992 EC_{7}	—	March 1, 1992	La Silla	UESAC	·	3.9 km	MPC · JPL
29235	1992 EU_{13}	—	March 2, 1992	La Silla	UESAC	·	4.7 km	MPC · JPL
29236	1992 EB_{14}	—	March 2, 1992	La Silla	UESAC	MAS	2.0 km	MPC · JPL
29237	1992 EG_{14}	—	March 2, 1992	La Silla	UESAC	·	2.5 km	MPC · JPL
29238	1992 EE_{17}	—	March 1, 1992	La Silla	UESAC	NYS	3.9 km	MPC · JPL
29239	1992 EJ_{17}	—	March 2, 1992	La Silla	UESAC	·	2.2 km	MPC · JPL
29240	1992 GE_{3}	—	April 4, 1992	La Silla	E. W. Elst	·	4.5 km	MPC · JPL
29241	1992 GA_{5}	—	April 4, 1992	La Silla	E. W. Elst	slow	4.8 km	MPC · JPL
29242	1992 HB_{4}	—	April 23, 1992	La Silla	E. W. Elst	H	2.7 km	MPC · JPL
29243	1992 JC_{1}	—	May 3, 1992	Kitt Peak	Spacewatch	·	3.9 km	MPC · JPL
29244 Van Damme	1992 OV_{1}	Van Damme	July 26, 1992	La Silla	E. W. Elst	EUN	7.2 km	MPC · JPL
29245	1992 PZ	—	August 8, 1992	Caussols	E. W. Elst	·	4.2 km	MPC · JPL
29246 Clausius	1992 RV	Clausius	September 2, 1992	Tautenburg Observatory	F. Börngen, L. D. Schmadel	·	12 km	MPC · JPL
29247	1992 RC_{4}	—	September 2, 1992	La Silla	E. W. Elst	·	3.1 km	MPC · JPL
29248	1992 SB_{10}	—	September 27, 1992	Kitt Peak	Spacewatch	·	4.6 km	MPC · JPL
29249 Hiraizumi	1992 SN_{12}	Hiraizumi	September 26, 1992	Geisei	T. Seki	AST	7.7 km	MPC · JPL
29250 Helmutmoritz	1992 SO_{17}	Helmutmoritz	September 24, 1992	Tautenburg Observatory	L. D. Schmadel, F. Börngen	DOR	8.8 km	MPC · JPL
29251 Hosokawa	1992 UH_{4}	Hosokawa	October 26, 1992	Kitami	K. Endate, K. Watanabe	EUN	7.6 km	MPC · JPL
29252 Konjikido	1993 BY_{2}	Konjikido	January 25, 1993	Geisei	T. Seki	·	9.4 km	MPC · JPL
29253	1993 DN	—	February 21, 1993	Kushiro	S. Ueda, H. Kaneda	·	3.0 km	MPC · JPL
29254	1993 FR_{1}	—	March 25, 1993	Kushiro	S. Ueda, H. Kaneda	HYG	15 km	MPC · JPL
29255	1993 FF_{4}	—	March 17, 1993	La Silla	UESAC	·	6.8 km	MPC · JPL
29256	1993 FC_{7}	—	March 17, 1993	La Silla	UESAC	(2076)	2.4 km	MPC · JPL
29257	1993 FK_{10}	—	March 17, 1993	La Silla	UESAC	·	2.1 km	MPC · JPL
29258	1993 FX_{11}	—	March 17, 1993	La Silla	UESAC	·	2.4 km	MPC · JPL
29259	1993 FZ_{11}	—	March 17, 1993	La Silla	UESAC	·	2.6 km	MPC · JPL
29260	1993 FG_{12}	—	March 17, 1993	La Silla	UESAC	·	8.1 km	MPC · JPL
29261	1993 FS_{13}	—	March 17, 1993	La Silla	UESAC	·	3.8 km	MPC · JPL
29262	1993 FP_{14}	—	March 17, 1993	La Silla	UESAC	·	3.1 km	MPC · JPL
29263	1993 FY_{14}	—	March 17, 1993	La Silla	UESAC	EOS	6.3 km	MPC · JPL
29264	1993 FR_{17}	—	March 17, 1993	La Silla	UESAC	·	1.7 km	MPC · JPL
29265	1993 FV_{18}	—	March 17, 1993	La Silla	UESAC	·	2.4 km	MPC · JPL
29266	1993 FA_{20}	—	March 17, 1993	La Silla	UESAC	·	6.4 km	MPC · JPL
29267	1993 FD_{22}	—	March 21, 1993	La Silla	UESAC	·	7.6 km	MPC · JPL
29268	1993 FY_{22}	—	March 21, 1993	La Silla	UESAC	·	6.0 km	MPC · JPL
29269	1993 FD_{25}	—	March 21, 1993	La Silla	UESAC	V	2.6 km	MPC · JPL
29270	1993 FF_{28}	—	March 21, 1993	La Silla	UESAC	·	2.3 km	MPC · JPL
29271	1993 FF_{31}	—	March 19, 1993	La Silla	UESAC	·	1.9 km	MPC · JPL
29272	1993 FO_{31}	—	March 19, 1993	La Silla	UESAC	·	1.6 km	MPC · JPL
29273	1993 FO_{32}	—	March 21, 1993	La Silla	UESAC	fast	3.0 km	MPC · JPL
29274	1993 FK_{33}	—	March 19, 1993	La Silla	UESAC	·	7.6 km	MPC · JPL
29275	1993 FM_{33}	—	March 19, 1993	La Silla	UESAC	·	2.6 km	MPC · JPL
29276	1993 FO_{33}	—	March 19, 1993	La Silla	UESAC	NYS	2.5 km	MPC · JPL
29277	1993 FB_{34}	—	March 19, 1993	La Silla	UESAC	·	6.2 km	MPC · JPL
29278	1993 FN_{34}	—	March 17, 1993	La Silla	UESAC	·	6.9 km	MPC · JPL
29279	1993 FC_{35}	—	March 19, 1993	La Silla	UESAC	·	2.4 km	MPC · JPL
29280	1993 FD_{36}	—	March 19, 1993	La Silla	UESAC	·	3.6 km	MPC · JPL
29281	1993 FJ_{38}	—	March 19, 1993	La Silla	UESAC	VER	9.8 km	MPC · JPL
29282	1993 FM_{39}	—	March 19, 1993	La Silla	UESAC	·	2.2 km	MPC · JPL
29283	1993 FD_{40}	—	March 19, 1993	La Silla	UESAC	V	1.4 km	MPC · JPL
29284	1993 FL_{41}	—	March 19, 1993	La Silla	UESAC	·	1.7 km	MPC · JPL
29285	1993 FD_{42}	—	March 19, 1993	La Silla	UESAC	THM	8.9 km	MPC · JPL
29286	1993 FA_{45}	—	March 19, 1993	La Silla	UESAC	·	2.1 km	MPC · JPL
29287	1993 FD_{49}	—	March 19, 1993	La Silla	UESAC	NYS	3.1 km	MPC · JPL
29288	1993 FJ_{51}	—	March 19, 1993	La Silla	UESAC	·	2.9 km	MPC · JPL
29289	1993 FM_{62}	—	March 19, 1993	La Silla	UESAC	·	3.3 km	MPC · JPL
29290	1993 FF_{84}	—	March 24, 1993	La Silla	UESAC	·	1.9 km	MPC · JPL
29291	1993 JX	—	May 14, 1993	La Silla	E. W. Elst	·	2.5 km	MPC · JPL
29292 Conniewalker	1993 KZ_{1}	Conniewalker	May 24, 1993	Palomar	C. S. Shoemaker, D. H. Levy	PHO	4.6 km	MPC · JPL
29293	1993 OG_{9}	—	July 20, 1993	La Silla	E. W. Elst	·	5.3 km	MPC · JPL
29294	1993 OH_{9}	—	July 20, 1993	La Silla	E. W. Elst	·	3.3 km	MPC · JPL
29295	1993 OC_{13}	—	July 19, 1993	La Silla	E. W. Elst	fast	2.7 km	MPC · JPL
29296	1993 PY_{5}	—	August 15, 1993	Caussols	E. W. Elst	·	4.9 km	MPC · JPL
29297	1993 RU_{7}	—	September 15, 1993	La Silla	E. W. Elst	·	3.3 km	MPC · JPL
29298 Cruls	1993 SA_{14}	Cruls	September 16, 1993	La Silla	H. Debehogne, E. W. Elst	H	2.2 km	MPC · JPL
29299 Kazama	1993 TW_{1}	Kazama	October 15, 1993	Kitami	K. Endate, K. Watanabe	·	6.1 km	MPC · JPL
29300	1993 TD_{25}	—	October 9, 1993	La Silla	E. W. Elst	·	2.5 km	MPC · JPL

== 29301–29400 ==
back to top

Designation			Discovery			Properties		Ref
Permanent	Provisional	Named after	Date	Site	Discoverer(s)	Category	Diam.	Ref
29301	1993 TQ_{31}	—	October 9, 1993	La Silla	E. W. Elst	·	3.0 km	MPC · JPL
29302	1993 TY_{34}	—	October 9, 1993	La Silla	E. W. Elst	·	2.5 km	MPC · JPL
29303	1993 TO_{36}	—	October 11, 1993	Palomar	H. E. Holt	(194)	8.0 km	MPC · JPL
29304	1993 TF_{37}	—	October 9, 1993	La Silla	E. W. Elst	·	2.0 km	MPC · JPL
29305	1993 TJ_{38}	—	October 9, 1993	La Silla	E. W. Elst	·	4.8 km	MPC · JPL
29306	1993 TK_{38}	—	October 9, 1993	La Silla	E. W. Elst	EUN	4.8 km	MPC · JPL
29307 Torbernbergman	1993 TB_{39}	Torbernbergman	October 9, 1993	La Silla	E. W. Elst	slow	6.2 km	MPC · JPL
29308	1993 UF_{1}	—	October 20, 1993	Palomar	E. F. Helin	H	2.3 km	MPC · JPL
29309	1993 VF_{1}	—	November 15, 1993	Dynic	A. Sugie	·	11 km	MPC · JPL
29310	1993 VA_{5}	—	November 15, 1993	Kiyosato	S. Otomo	·	4.4 km	MPC · JPL
29311 Lesire	1994 BQ_{3}	Lesire	January 16, 1994	Caussols	E. W. Elst, C. Pollas	EUN	9.3 km	MPC · JPL
29312	1994 BL_{4}	—	January 21, 1994	Fujieda	Shiozawa, H., T. Urata	·	3.9 km	MPC · JPL
29313	1994 CR	—	February 4, 1994	Kushiro	S. Ueda, H. Kaneda	·	4.3 km	MPC · JPL
29314 Eurydamas	1994 CR_{18}	Eurydamas	February 8, 1994	La Silla	E. W. Elst	L5	21 km	MPC · JPL
29315	1994 EV_{5}	—	March 9, 1994	Caussols	E. W. Elst	·	7.6 km	MPC · JPL
29316	1994 LY_{1}	—	June 7, 1994	Kitt Peak	Spacewatch	·	2.1 km	MPC · JPL
29317	1994 PR_{9}	—	August 10, 1994	La Silla	E. W. Elst	·	4.1 km	MPC · JPL
29318	1994 PH_{14}	—	August 10, 1994	La Silla	E. W. Elst	·	2.4 km	MPC · JPL
29319	1994 PS_{14}	—	August 10, 1994	La Silla	E. W. Elst	·	2.0 km	MPC · JPL
29320	1994 PW_{14}	—	August 10, 1994	La Silla	E. W. Elst	·	2.2 km	MPC · JPL
29321	1994 PL_{16}	—	August 10, 1994	La Silla	E. W. Elst	·	1.8 km	MPC · JPL
29322	1994 PS_{16}	—	August 10, 1994	La Silla	E. W. Elst	·	1.2 km	MPC · JPL
29323	1994 PN_{19}	—	August 12, 1994	La Silla	E. W. Elst	·	1.7 km	MPC · JPL
29324	1994 PM_{31}	—	August 12, 1994	La Silla	E. W. Elst	V	2.4 km	MPC · JPL
29325	1994 PN_{39}	—	August 10, 1994	La Silla	E. W. Elst	·	1.6 km	MPC · JPL
29326	1994 RK_{3}	—	September 2, 1994	Kitt Peak	Spacewatch	NYS	2.7 km	MPC · JPL
29327	1994 SV_{9}	—	September 28, 1994	Kitt Peak	Spacewatch	·	3.0 km	MPC · JPL
29328 Hanshintigers	1994 TU_{14}	Hanshintigers	October 13, 1994	Kiso	Kiso	·	3.2 km	MPC · JPL
29329 Knobelsdorff	1994 TN_{16}	Knobelsdorff	October 5, 1994	Tautenburg Observatory	F. Börngen	·	2.4 km	MPC · JPL
29330	1994 UK	—	October 31, 1994	Oizumi	T. Kobayashi	MAS	2.1 km	MPC · JPL
29331	1994 UC_{8}	—	October 28, 1994	Kitt Peak	Spacewatch	·	3.2 km	MPC · JPL
29332	1994 VE	—	November 1, 1994	Oizumi	T. Kobayashi	·	6.5 km	MPC · JPL
29333	1994 VE_{2}	—	November 8, 1994	Oizumi	T. Kobayashi	·	2.1 km	MPC · JPL
29334	1994 XJ	—	December 3, 1994	Oizumi	T. Kobayashi	V · slow	2.9 km	MPC · JPL
29335	1994 XL	—	December 3, 1994	Oizumi	T. Kobayashi	·	3.0 km	MPC · JPL
29336	1994 YT_{1}	—	December 31, 1994	Oizumi	T. Kobayashi	·	6.3 km	MPC · JPL
29337 Hakurojo	1995 AE_{1}	Hakurojo	January 6, 1995	Geisei	T. Seki	·	4.2 km	MPC · JPL
29338	1995 AV_{2}	—	January 2, 1995	Kushiro	S. Ueda, H. Kaneda	·	8.4 km	MPC · JPL
29339	1995 BA	—	January 19, 1995	Oizumi	T. Kobayashi	·	3.5 km	MPC · JPL
29340	1995 BF	—	January 23, 1995	Oizumi	T. Kobayashi	·	6.7 km	MPC · JPL
29341	1995 BC_{1}	—	January 25, 1995	Oizumi	T. Kobayashi	·	6.0 km	MPC · JPL
29342	1995 CF_{1}	—	February 3, 1995	Nyukasa	M. Hirasawa, S. Suzuki	·	4.0 km	MPC · JPL
29343	1995 CK_{10}	—	February 1, 1995	Nachi-Katsuura	Y. Shimizu, T. Urata	EUN ·	6.9 km	MPC · JPL
29344	1995 DX	—	February 20, 1995	Oizumi	T. Kobayashi	ADE	7.4 km	MPC · JPL
29345 Ivandanilov	1995 DS_{1}	Ivandanilov	February 22, 1995	Zelenchukskaya	T. V. Krjačko	·	6.1 km	MPC · JPL
29346 Mariadina	1995 DB_{13}	Mariadina	February 25, 1995	Asiago	M. Tombelli	·	4.8 km	MPC · JPL
29347 Natta	1995 EU	Natta	March 5, 1995	Colleverde	V. S. Casulli	·	4.5 km	MPC · JPL
29348 Criswick	1995 FD	Criswick	March 28, 1995	Climenhaga	D. D. Balam	·	4.1 km	MPC · JPL
29349	1995 FQ_{4}	—	March 23, 1995	Kitt Peak	Spacewatch	·	4.4 km	MPC · JPL
29350	1995 FQ_{20}	—	March 31, 1995	Kitt Peak	Spacewatch	·	3.9 km	MPC · JPL
29351	1995 HP_{2}	—	April 25, 1995	Kitt Peak	Spacewatch	MRX	3.2 km	MPC · JPL
29352	1995 JR	—	May 1, 1995	Kitt Peak	Spacewatch	·	4.8 km	MPC · JPL
29353 Manu	1995 OG	Manu	July 19, 1995	San Marcello	A. Boattini, L. Tesi	EOS	5.5 km	MPC · JPL
29354	1995 OR_{1}	—	July 19, 1995	Xinglong	SCAP	THM	8.7 km	MPC · JPL
29355 Siratakayama	1995 QX_{3}	Siratakayama	August 28, 1995	Nanyo	T. Okuni	EOS	5.6 km	MPC · JPL
29356 Giovarduino	1995 SY_{29}	Giovarduino	September 25, 1995	Pleiade	P. Antolini	THM	9.0 km	MPC · JPL
29357	1995 YE_{6}	—	December 16, 1995	Kitt Peak	Spacewatch	·	1.4 km	MPC · JPL
29358	1996 AY_{7}	—	January 12, 1996	Kitt Peak	Spacewatch	·	2.2 km	MPC · JPL
29359	1996 BK	—	January 16, 1996	Višnjan Observatory	Višnjan	·	3.7 km	MPC · JPL
29360	1996 BR_{14}	—	January 18, 1996	Kitt Peak	Spacewatch	·	3.5 km	MPC · JPL
29361 Botticelli	1996 CY	Botticelli	February 9, 1996	Colleverde	V. S. Casulli	·	2.3 km	MPC · JPL
29362 Azumakofuzi	1996 CY_{2}	Azumakofuzi	February 15, 1996	Nanyo	T. Okuni	·	3.0 km	MPC · JPL
29363 Ghigabartolini	1996 CW_{8}	Ghigabartolini	February 14, 1996	Cima Ekar	U. Munari, M. Tombelli	V	3.2 km	MPC · JPL
29364	1996 DG	—	February 18, 1996	Oizumi	T. Kobayashi	·	2.8 km	MPC · JPL
29365	1996 DN_{2}	—	February 23, 1996	Oizumi	T. Kobayashi	·	3.2 km	MPC · JPL
29366	1996 DS_{6}	—	February 16, 1996	Caussols	E. W. Elst	(2076)	3.8 km	MPC · JPL
29367	1996 EN_{12}	—	March 13, 1996	Kitt Peak	Spacewatch	V	1.8 km	MPC · JPL
29368	1996 FF_{2}	—	March 20, 1996	Haleakala	NEAT	·	2.3 km	MPC · JPL
29369	1996 FK_{2}	—	March 21, 1996	Haleakala	NEAT	·	2.3 km	MPC · JPL
29370	1996 FQ_{4}	—	March 18, 1996	Haleakala	NEAT	·	2.6 km	MPC · JPL
29371	1996 FG_{16}	—	March 22, 1996	La Silla	E. W. Elst	NYS	1.9 km	MPC · JPL
29372	1996 GA	—	April 5, 1996	Višnjan Observatory	Višnjan	PHO	6.0 km	MPC · JPL
29373 Hamanowa	1996 GP_{2}	Hamanowa	April 14, 1996	Nanyo	T. Okuni	·	3.4 km	MPC · JPL
29374 Kazumitsu	1996 GZ_{2}	Kazumitsu	April 13, 1996	Kitami	K. Endate, K. Watanabe	·	2.3 km	MPC · JPL
29375	1996 GN_{17}	—	April 15, 1996	La Silla	E. W. Elst	NYS	3.3 km	MPC · JPL
29376	1996 GU_{17}	—	April 15, 1996	La Silla	E. W. Elst	·	4.1 km	MPC · JPL
29377	1996 GV_{18}	—	April 15, 1996	La Silla	E. W. Elst	V	2.8 km	MPC · JPL
29378	1996 HP_{4}	—	April 18, 1996	Kitt Peak	Spacewatch	·	4.1 km	MPC · JPL
29379	1996 HX_{12}	—	April 17, 1996	La Silla	E. W. Elst	·	4.7 km	MPC · JPL
29380	1996 HO_{13}	—	April 17, 1996	La Silla	E. W. Elst	·	3.6 km	MPC · JPL
29381	1996 HR_{15}	—	April 18, 1996	La Silla	E. W. Elst	·	3.2 km	MPC · JPL
29382	1996 HM_{16}	—	April 18, 1996	La Silla	E. W. Elst	·	4.1 km	MPC · JPL
29383	1996 HA_{23}	—	April 20, 1996	La Silla	E. W. Elst	·	3.3 km	MPC · JPL
29384	1996 HO_{23}	—	April 20, 1996	La Silla	E. W. Elst	·	2.7 km	MPC · JPL
29385	1996 JT	—	May 13, 1996	Haleakala	NEAT	·	2.8 km	MPC · JPL
29386	1996 JC_{5}	—	May 10, 1996	Kitt Peak	Spacewatch	V	3.5 km	MPC · JPL
29387	1996 JC_{6}	—	May 11, 1996	Kitt Peak	Spacewatch	NYS	4.7 km	MPC · JPL
29388	1996 JD_{6}	—	May 11, 1996	Kitt Peak	Spacewatch	·	4.3 km	MPC · JPL
29389	1996 LZ	—	June 13, 1996	Haleakala	NEAT	·	3.8 km	MPC · JPL
29390	1996 LO_{3}	—	June 11, 1996	Kitt Peak	Spacewatch	V	2.7 km	MPC · JPL
29391 Knight	1996 MB	Knight	June 17, 1996	Needville	Needville	MIS	6.4 km	MPC · JPL
29392	1996 MN_{1}	—	June 16, 1996	Kitt Peak	Spacewatch	EUN	3.9 km	MPC · JPL
29393	1996 NA_{3}	—	July 14, 1996	La Silla	E. W. Elst	MAR	4.6 km	MPC · JPL
29394 Hirokohamanowa	1996 NR_{5}	Hirokohamanowa	July 12, 1996	Nanyo	T. Okuni	EUN	4.8 km	MPC · JPL
29395	1996 PO_{1}	—	August 5, 1996	Haleakala	AMOS	·	4.1 km	MPC · JPL
29396	1996 PM_{3}	—	August 6, 1996	Xinglong	SCAP	·	5.9 km	MPC · JPL
29397	1996 RU_{3}	—	September 13, 1996	Haleakala	NEAT	·	4.8 km	MPC · JPL
29398	1996 RM_{5}	—	September 15, 1996	Xinglong	SCAP	·	6.2 km	MPC · JPL
29399	1996 RO_{5}	—	September 15, 1996	Xinglong	SCAP	·	4.8 km	MPC · JPL
29400	1996 RO_{6}	—	September 5, 1996	Kitt Peak	Spacewatch	·	4.1 km	MPC · JPL

== 29401–29500 ==
back to top

Designation			Discovery			Properties		Ref
Permanent	Provisional	Named after	Date	Site	Discoverer(s)	Category	Diam.	Ref
29401 Astérix	1996 TE	Astérix	October 1, 1996	Kleť	M. Tichý, Z. Moravec	KOR	3.5 km	MPC · JPL
29402 Obélix	1996 TT_{9}	Obélix	October 14, 1996	Kleť	M. Tichý, Z. Moravec	·	7.4 km	MPC · JPL
29403	1996 TO_{13}	—	October 5, 1996	Xinglong	SCAP	·	3.7 km	MPC · JPL
29404 Hikarusato	1996 TS_{14}	Hikarusato	October 9, 1996	Nanyo	T. Okuni	KOR	4.8 km	MPC · JPL
29405	1996 TN_{18}	—	October 4, 1996	Kitt Peak	Spacewatch	THM	9.2 km	MPC · JPL
29406	1996 TS_{32}	—	October 10, 1996	Kitt Peak	Spacewatch	EUN	5.5 km	MPC · JPL
29407	1996 UW	—	October 20, 1996	Oizumi	T. Kobayashi	·	3.5 km	MPC · JPL
29408 Katoyuko	1996 VJ_{5}	Katoyuko	November 3, 1996	Kitami	K. Endate, K. Watanabe	·	10 km	MPC · JPL
29409	1996 VW_{5}	—	November 14, 1996	Oizumi	T. Kobayashi	·	7.1 km	MPC · JPL
29410	1996 VD_{6}	—	November 15, 1996	Oizumi	T. Kobayashi	HYG	10 km	MPC · JPL
29411	1996 WQ_{2}	—	November 20, 1996	Xinglong	SCAP	·	7.5 km	MPC · JPL
29412	1996 WJ_{3}	—	November 27, 1996	Xinglong	SCAP	·	8.4 km	MPC · JPL
29413	1996 XE_{1}	—	December 2, 1996	Oizumi	T. Kobayashi	EOS	8.1 km	MPC · JPL
29414	1996 XF_{1}	—	December 2, 1996	Oizumi	T. Kobayashi	HYG · slow	6.9 km	MPC · JPL
29415	1996 XU_{5}	—	December 7, 1996	Oizumi	T. Kobayashi	·	7.5 km	MPC · JPL
29416	1996 XX_{5}	—	December 7, 1996	Oizumi	T. Kobayashi	·	6.5 km	MPC · JPL
29417	1996 XR_{26}	—	December 6, 1996	Xinglong	SCAP	·	10 km	MPC · JPL
29418	1997 AH_{13}	—	January 11, 1997	Oizumi	T. Kobayashi	·	12 km	MPC · JPL
29419 Mládková	1997 AD_{18}	Mládková	January 13, 1997	Ondřejov	L. Kotková	CYB	7.0 km	MPC · JPL
29420 Ikuo	1997 AT_{18}	Ikuo	January 9, 1997	Chichibu	N. Satō	·	12 km	MPC · JPL
29421	1997 AV_{18}	—	January 9, 1997	Chichibu	N. Satō	H	1.6 km	MPC · JPL
29422	1997 AH_{21}	—	January 9, 1997	Kushiro	S. Ueda, H. Kaneda	TIR	8.0 km	MPC · JPL
29423	1997 AF_{22}	—	January 9, 1997	Kushiro	S. Ueda, H. Kaneda	·	17 km	MPC · JPL
29424	1997 BV_{4}	—	January 29, 1997	Sormano	A. Testa, P. Chiavenna	·	10 km	MPC · JPL
29425	1997 CZ_{21}	—	February 13, 1997	Oizumi	T. Kobayashi	·	1.9 km	MPC · JPL
29426	1997 CH_{28}	—	February 11, 1997	Xinglong	SCAP	·	17 km	MPC · JPL
29427 Oswaldthomas	1997 EJ_{11}	Oswaldthomas	March 7, 1997	Linz	E. Meyer	·	1.4 km	MPC · JPL
29428 Ettoremajorana	1997 FM_{1}	Ettoremajorana	March 31, 1997	Colleverde	V. S. Casulli	H	1.9 km	MPC · JPL
29429	1997 GO_{13}	—	April 3, 1997	Socorro	LINEAR	·	1.8 km	MPC · JPL
29430 Mimiyen	1997 GG_{22}	Mimiyen	April 6, 1997	Socorro	LINEAR	·	1.8 km	MPC · JPL
29431 Shijimi	1997 GA_{26}	Shijimi	April 12, 1997	Yatsuka	H. Abe	·	3.2 km	MPC · JPL
29432 Williamscott	1997 GP_{34}	Williamscott	April 3, 1997	Socorro	LINEAR	·	6.8 km	MPC · JPL
29433	1997 HC_{3}	—	April 30, 1997	Kitt Peak	Spacewatch	3:2	14 km	MPC · JPL
29434	1997 HZ_{13}	—	April 30, 1997	Socorro	LINEAR	·	1.4 km	MPC · JPL
29435 Mordell	1997 JB_{8}	Mordell	May 8, 1997	Prescott	P. G. Comba	·	1.9 km	MPC · JPL
29436	1997 JT_{14}	—	May 3, 1997	La Silla	E. W. Elst	·	2.9 km	MPC · JPL
29437 Marchais	1997 LG_{1}	Marchais	June 7, 1997	Castres	Klotz, A.	·	4.5 km	MPC · JPL
29438 Zhengjia	1997 MV	Zhengjia	June 26, 1997	Xinglong	SCAP	slow?	1.8 km	MPC · JPL
29439 Maxfabiani	1997 MQ_{1}	Maxfabiani	June 28, 1997	Farra d'Isonzo	Farra d'Isonzo	·	2.3 km	MPC · JPL
29440	1997 MK_{4}	—	June 28, 1997	Socorro	LINEAR	·	2.5 km	MPC · JPL
29441	1997 NN_{1}	—	July 2, 1997	Kitt Peak	Spacewatch	·	2.8 km	MPC · JPL
29442	1997 NS_{4}	—	July 8, 1997	Caussols	ODAS	·	2.9 km	MPC · JPL
29443 Remocorti	1997 NM_{10}	Remocorti	July 13, 1997	San Marcello	L. Tesi, G. Cattani	·	2.6 km	MPC · JPL
29444	1997 NR_{10}	—	July 6, 1997	Moriyama	Ikari, Y.	ERI	3.7 km	MPC · JPL
29445	1997 PH	—	August 1, 1997	Haleakala	NEAT	V	3.5 km	MPC · JPL
29446 Gouguenheim	1997 PX	Gouguenheim	August 4, 1997	Caussols	ODAS	·	2.1 km	MPC · JPL
29447 Jerzyneyman	1997 PY_{2}	Jerzyneyman	August 12, 1997	Prescott	P. G. Comba	·	2.3 km	MPC · JPL
29448 Pappos	1997 QJ	Pappos	August 23, 1997	Prescott	P. G. Comba	·	2.9 km	MPC · JPL
29449 Taharbenjelloun	1997 QR_{2}	Taharbenjelloun	August 29, 1997	Colleverde	V. S. Casulli	EUN	3.2 km	MPC · JPL
29450 Tomohiroohno	1997 QZ_{2}	Tomohiroohno	August 28, 1997	Nanyo	T. Okuni	·	5.3 km	MPC · JPL
29451	1997 RM_{1}	—	September 2, 1997	Haleakala	NEAT	·	4.7 km	MPC · JPL
29452	1997 RV_{2}	—	September 3, 1997	Majorca	Á. López J., R. Pacheco	PHO	5.8 km	MPC · JPL
29453	1997 RU_{6}	—	September 5, 1997	Majorca	Á. López J., R. Pacheco	slow	4.2 km	MPC · JPL
29454	1997 RZ_{6}	—	September 9, 1997	Rand	G. R. Viscome	·	3.9 km	MPC · JPL
29455	1997 SX_{1}	—	September 23, 1997	Ondřejov	P. Pravec, M. Wolf	·	7.3 km	MPC · JPL
29456 Evakrchová	1997 SN_{2}	Evakrchová	September 24, 1997	Ondřejov	L. Kotková	·	4.5 km	MPC · JPL
29457 Marcopolo	1997 SO_{4}	Marcopolo	September 25, 1997	Pianoro	V. Goretti	NYS	3.8 km	MPC · JPL
29458 Pearson	1997 SJ_{11}	Pearson	September 30, 1997	Prescott	P. G. Comba	NYS	3.2 km	MPC · JPL
29459	1997 SO_{16}	—	September 29, 1997	Xinglong	SCAP	·	3.7 km	MPC · JPL
29460	1997 SR_{31}	—	September 30, 1997	Kitt Peak	Spacewatch	·	4.0 km	MPC · JPL
29461	1997 SP_{32}	—	September 30, 1997	Xinglong	SCAP	NYS	3.1 km	MPC · JPL
29462	1997 SG_{34}	—	September 29, 1997	Caussols	ODAS	·	3.6 km	MPC · JPL
29463 Benjaminpeirce	1997 TB	Benjaminpeirce	October 2, 1997	Prescott	P. G. Comba	·	4.3 km	MPC · JPL
29464 Leonmiš	1997 TY_{9}	Leonmiš	October 5, 1997	Ondřejov	P. Pravec	·	2.2 km	MPC · JPL
29465	1997 TX_{10}	—	October 3, 1997	Kitt Peak	Spacewatch	KON	5.2 km	MPC · JPL
29466	1997 TN_{17}	—	October 8, 1997	Oizumi	T. Kobayashi	·	6.4 km	MPC · JPL
29467 Shandongdaxue	1997 TS_{26}	Shandongdaxue	October 15, 1997	Xinglong	SCAP	GEF	4.1 km	MPC · JPL
29468	1997 UC	—	October 20, 1997	Oohira	T. Urata	PHO	3.4 km	MPC · JPL
29469	1997 UV_{2}	—	October 25, 1997	Oohira	T. Urata	·	5.1 km	MPC · JPL
29470 Higgs	1997 UC_{7}	Higgs	October 26, 1997	Colleverde	V. S. Casulli	EUN	7.3 km	MPC · JPL
29471 Spejbl	1997 UT_{7}	Spejbl	October 27, 1997	Ondřejov	L. Kotková	·	3.0 km	MPC · JPL
29472 Hurvínek	1997 UV_{7}	Hurvínek	October 27, 1997	Ondřejov	L. Kotková	(5)	3.5 km	MPC · JPL
29473 Krejčí	1997 UE_{8}	Krejčí	October 21, 1997	Ondřejov	P. Pravec, L. Kotková	·	3.9 km	MPC · JPL
29474 Toyoshima	1997 UT_{8}	Toyoshima	October 25, 1997	Kitami	K. Endate, K. Watanabe	·	3.7 km	MPC · JPL
29475	1997 UF_{11}	—	October 29, 1997	Haleakala	NEAT	PHO	9.2 km	MPC · JPL
29476 Kvíčala	1997 UX_{14}	Kvíčala	October 31, 1997	Ondřejov	P. Pravec	·	3.4 km	MPC · JPL
29477 Zdíkšíma	1997 UE_{15}	Zdíkšíma	October 31, 1997	Kleť	J. Tichá, M. Tichý	·	2.8 km	MPC · JPL
29478	1997 UW_{17}	—	October 28, 1997	Kitt Peak	Spacewatch	·	5.4 km	MPC · JPL
29479	1997 VJ_{1}	—	November 1, 1997	Oohira	T. Urata	MAR	4.6 km	MPC · JPL
29480	1997 VO_{1}	—	November 1, 1997	Kushiro	S. Ueda, H. Kaneda	EUN	4.7 km	MPC · JPL
29481	1997 VJ_{3}	—	November 6, 1997	Oizumi	T. Kobayashi	·	5.7 km	MPC · JPL
29482	1997 VM_{3}	—	November 6, 1997	Oizumi	T. Kobayashi	·	14 km	MPC · JPL
29483 Boeker	1997 VD_{5}	Boeker	November 3, 1997	Solingen	Koch, B.	·	2.6 km	MPC · JPL
29484 Honzaveselý	1997 VJ_{6}	Honzaveselý	November 9, 1997	Ondřejov	L. Kotková	(5)	3.2 km	MPC · JPL
29485	1997 VE_{7}	—	November 2, 1997	Xinglong	SCAP	·	2.9 km	MPC · JPL
29486	1997 VG_{7}	—	November 2, 1997	Xinglong	SCAP	·	2.1 km	MPC · JPL
29487	1997 VU_{8}	—	November 14, 1997	Xinglong	SCAP	EUN	5.6 km	MPC · JPL
29488	1997 WM	—	November 18, 1997	Oizumi	T. Kobayashi	·	4.9 km	MPC · JPL
29489	1997 WQ	—	November 18, 1997	Oizumi	T. Kobayashi	EUN	5.9 km	MPC · JPL
29490 Myslbek	1997 WX	Myslbek	November 19, 1997	Ondřejov	P. Pravec	·	3.2 km	MPC · JPL
29491 Pfaff	1997 WB_{1}	Pfaff	November 23, 1997	Prescott	P. G. Comba	·	3.8 km	MPC · JPL
29492	1997 WP_{2}	—	November 23, 1997	Oizumi	T. Kobayashi	·	16 km	MPC · JPL
29493	1997 WR_{5}	—	November 23, 1997	Kitt Peak	Spacewatch	·	3.3 km	MPC · JPL
29494	1997 WL_{7}	—	November 19, 1997	Nachi-Katsuura	Y. Shimizu, T. Urata	·	11 km	MPC · JPL
29495	1997 WU_{7}	—	November 27, 1997	Woomera	F. B. Zoltowski	·	11 km	MPC · JPL
29496	1997 WE_{8}	—	November 19, 1997	Nachi-Katsuura	Y. Shimizu, T. Urata	·	5.6 km	MPC · JPL
29497	1997 WD_{15}	—	November 23, 1997	Kitt Peak	Spacewatch	·	6.3 km	MPC · JPL
29498	1997 WK_{21}	—	November 30, 1997	Oizumi	T. Kobayashi	·	9.4 km	MPC · JPL
29499	1997 WT_{21}	—	November 30, 1997	Oizumi	T. Kobayashi	KOR	4.0 km	MPC · JPL
29500	1997 WP_{32}	—	November 29, 1997	Socorro	LINEAR	THM	8.9 km	MPC · JPL

== 29501–29600 ==
back to top

Designation			Discovery			Properties		Ref
Permanent	Provisional	Named after	Date	Site	Discoverer(s)	Category	Diam.	Ref
29501	1997 WQ_{32}	—	November 29, 1997	Socorro	LINEAR	·	2.8 km	MPC · JPL
29502	1997 WL_{35}	—	November 29, 1997	Socorro	LINEAR	·	3.4 km	MPC · JPL
29503	1997 WQ_{38}	—	November 29, 1997	Socorro	LINEAR	BRG	5.7 km	MPC · JPL
29504	1997 WS_{44}	—	November 29, 1997	Socorro	LINEAR	·	4.1 km	MPC · JPL
29505	1997 WV_{44}	—	November 29, 1997	Socorro	LINEAR	DOR	9.2 km	MPC · JPL
29506	1997 XM	—	December 3, 1997	Oizumi	T. Kobayashi	·	4.0 km	MPC · JPL
29507	1997 XV	—	December 3, 1997	Oizumi	T. Kobayashi	·	4.9 km	MPC · JPL
29508 Bottinelli	1997 XR_{8}	Bottinelli	December 7, 1997	Caussols	ODAS	THM	7.0 km	MPC · JPL
29509 Kuangtingyun	1997 YK_{1}	Kuangtingyun	December 17, 1997	Xinglong	SCAP	EOS	5.7 km	MPC · JPL
29510	1997 YF_{2}	—	December 21, 1997	Oizumi	T. Kobayashi	EOS · fast	6.7 km	MPC · JPL
29511	1997 YP_{3}	—	December 21, 1997	Xinglong	SCAP	·	3.6 km	MPC · JPL
29512	1997 YL_{5}	—	December 25, 1997	Oizumi	T. Kobayashi	·	5.4 km	MPC · JPL
29513	1997 YT_{5}	—	December 25, 1997	Oizumi	T. Kobayashi	EOS	9.0 km	MPC · JPL
29514 Karatsu	1997 YV_{6}	Karatsu	December 25, 1997	Chichibu	N. Satō	·	10 km	MPC · JPL
29515	1997 YL_{7}	—	December 27, 1997	Oizumi	T. Kobayashi	·	7.8 km	MPC · JPL
29516	1997 YO_{7}	—	December 27, 1997	Oizumi	T. Kobayashi	EOS	6.4 km	MPC · JPL
29517	1997 YQ_{10}	—	December 30, 1997	Oizumi	T. Kobayashi	·	15 km	MPC · JPL
29518	1997 YW_{11}	—	December 31, 1997	Lime Creek	Houlden, T., Ross, E.	AGN	4.9 km	MPC · JPL
29519	1997 YH_{13}	—	December 29, 1997	Kitt Peak	Spacewatch	·	8.9 km	MPC · JPL
29520	1997 YH_{14}	—	December 31, 1997	Oizumi	T. Kobayashi	KOR	3.9 km	MPC · JPL
29521	1997 YK_{14}	—	December 31, 1997	Oizumi	T. Kobayashi	·	12 km	MPC · JPL
29522	1997 YL_{15}	—	December 29, 1997	Kitt Peak	Spacewatch	THM	6.3 km	MPC · JPL
29523	1997 YO_{21}	—	December 29, 1997	Kitt Peak	Spacewatch	AGN	2.9 km	MPC · JPL
29524	1998 AE	—	January 3, 1998	Oaxaca	Roe, J. M.	2:1J	12 km	MPC · JPL
29525	1998 AF	—	January 2, 1998	Moriyama	Ikari, Y.	(2076)	3.0 km	MPC · JPL
29526	1998 AV	—	January 5, 1998	Oizumi	T. Kobayashi	·	13 km	MPC · JPL
29527	1998 AY_{6}	—	January 5, 1998	Xinglong	SCAP	·	5.7 km	MPC · JPL
29528 Kaplinski	1998 AN_{8}	Kaplinski	January 10, 1998	Ondřejov	L. Kotková	·	4.5 km	MPC · JPL
29529	1998 BM	—	January 18, 1998	Oizumi	T. Kobayashi	·	13 km	MPC · JPL
29530	1998 BT	—	January 19, 1998	Oizumi	T. Kobayashi	EOS	5.4 km	MPC · JPL
29531	1998 BA_{1}	—	January 19, 1998	Oizumi	T. Kobayashi	·	8.3 km	MPC · JPL
29532	1998 BJ_{1}	—	January 19, 1998	Oizumi	T. Kobayashi	·	4.5 km	MPC · JPL
29533	1998 BW_{1}	—	January 19, 1998	Les Tardieux Obs.	Boeuf, M.	·	6.1 km	MPC · JPL
29534	1998 BP_{7}	—	January 24, 1998	Haleakala	NEAT	·	7.5 km	MPC · JPL
29535	1998 BF_{8}	—	January 25, 1998	Oizumi	T. Kobayashi	EOS	5.7 km	MPC · JPL
29536	1998 BC_{12}	—	January 23, 1998	Socorro	LINEAR	·	9.6 km	MPC · JPL
29537	1998 BW_{15}	—	January 24, 1998	Haleakala	NEAT	VER	6.8 km	MPC · JPL
29538	1998 BN_{16}	—	January 25, 1998	Haleakala	NEAT	CYB	22 km	MPC · JPL
29539	1998 BT_{23}	—	January 26, 1998	Kitt Peak	Spacewatch	THM	8.7 km	MPC · JPL
29540	1998 BV_{24}	—	January 28, 1998	Oizumi	T. Kobayashi	·	12 km	MPC · JPL
29541	1998 BZ_{24}	—	January 28, 1998	Oizumi	T. Kobayashi	·	7.2 km	MPC · JPL
29542	1998 BZ_{25}	—	January 29, 1998	Oizumi	T. Kobayashi	EOS	6.0 km	MPC · JPL
29543	1998 BV_{29}	—	January 29, 1998	Kitt Peak	Spacewatch	·	4.4 km	MPC · JPL
29544	1998 BE_{30}	—	January 30, 1998	Oizumi	T. Kobayashi	EOS	7.3 km	MPC · JPL
29545	1998 BM_{31}	—	January 26, 1998	Kitt Peak	Spacewatch	THM	10 km	MPC · JPL
29546	1998 BV_{33}	—	January 31, 1998	Oizumi	T. Kobayashi	·	15 km	MPC · JPL
29547 Yurimazzanti	1998 BA_{34}	Yurimazzanti	January 25, 1998	Cima Ekar	M. Tombelli, U. Munari	EOS	8.2 km	MPC · JPL
29548	1998 BC_{42}	—	January 19, 1998	Xinglong	SCAP	·	8.2 km	MPC · JPL
29549 Sandrasbaragli	1998 BB_{44}	Sandrasbaragli	January 25, 1998	Cima Ekar	M. Tombelli, A. Boattini	·	4.9 km	MPC · JPL
29550 Yaribartolini	1998 BE_{44}	Yaribartolini	January 25, 1998	Cima Ekar	M. Tombelli, G. Forti	EUN	5.0 km	MPC · JPL
29551	1998 CH_{1}	—	February 5, 1998	Xinglong	SCAP	KOR · fast	3.8 km	MPC · JPL
29552 Chern	1998 CS_{2}	Chern	February 15, 1998	Xinglong	SCAP	·	8.4 km	MPC · JPL
29553	1998 CZ_{3}	—	February 6, 1998	La Silla	E. W. Elst	·	7.6 km	MPC · JPL
29554	1998 CL_{4}	—	February 6, 1998	La Silla	E. W. Elst	EOS	6.1 km	MPC · JPL
29555 MACEK	1998 DP	MACEK	February 18, 1998	Kleť	M. Tichý, Z. Moravec	·	23 km	MPC · JPL
29556	1998 DR_{2}	—	February 21, 1998	Oizumi	T. Kobayashi	EOS	9.5 km	MPC · JPL
29557	1998 DV_{3}	—	February 22, 1998	Haleakala	NEAT	THM	8.8 km	MPC · JPL
29558	1998 DN_{4}	—	February 22, 1998	Haleakala	NEAT	·	4.2 km	MPC · JPL
29559	1998 DS_{4}	—	February 22, 1998	Haleakala	NEAT	·	9.7 km	MPC · JPL
29560	1998 DE_{9}	—	February 22, 1998	Haleakala	NEAT	·	13 km	MPC · JPL
29561 Iatteri	1998 DU_{10}	Iatteri	February 21, 1998	Stroncone	Santa Lucia	·	12 km	MPC · JPL
29562 Danmacdonald	1998 DM_{14}	Danmacdonald	February 22, 1998	Haleakala	NEAT	EOS	7.7 km	MPC · JPL
29563	1998 DY_{26}	—	February 24, 1998	Kitt Peak	Spacewatch	EOS	6.7 km	MPC · JPL
29564	1998 ED_{6}	—	March 2, 1998	Nachi-Katsuura	Y. Shimizu, T. Urata	·	27 km	MPC · JPL
29565 Glenngould	1998 FD	Glenngould	March 17, 1998	Les Tardieux Obs.	Boeuf, M.	·	6.9 km	MPC · JPL
29566	1998 FK_{5}	—	March 24, 1998	Socorro	LINEAR	·	1.8 km	MPC · JPL
29567	1998 FT_{13}	—	March 26, 1998	Haleakala	NEAT	EOS	10 km	MPC · JPL
29568 Gobbi-Belcredi	1998 FG_{16}	Gobbi-Belcredi	March 25, 1998	Bologna	San Vittore	·	4.6 km	MPC · JPL
29569	1998 FA_{23}	—	March 20, 1998	Socorro	LINEAR	EOS	5.6 km	MPC · JPL
29570	1998 FY_{27}	—	March 20, 1998	Socorro	LINEAR	·	7.2 km	MPC · JPL
29571	1998 FC_{29}	—	March 20, 1998	Socorro	LINEAR	(5651)	13 km	MPC · JPL
29572	1998 FH_{30}	—	March 20, 1998	Socorro	LINEAR	EOS	5.6 km	MPC · JPL
29573	1998 FU_{38}	—	March 20, 1998	Socorro	LINEAR	·	9.3 km	MPC · JPL
29574	1998 FM_{45}	—	March 20, 1998	Socorro	LINEAR	3:2	20 km	MPC · JPL
29575 Gundlapalli	1998 FM_{51}	Gundlapalli	March 20, 1998	Socorro	LINEAR	·	6.2 km	MPC · JPL
29576	1998 FF_{52}	—	March 20, 1998	Socorro	LINEAR	·	9.7 km	MPC · JPL
29577	1998 FA_{53}	—	March 20, 1998	Socorro	LINEAR	·	12 km	MPC · JPL
29578	1998 FU_{53}	—	March 20, 1998	Socorro	LINEAR	·	12 km	MPC · JPL
29579	1998 FV_{54}	—	March 20, 1998	Socorro	LINEAR	AEG	10 km	MPC · JPL
29580	1998 FK_{55}	—	March 20, 1998	Socorro	LINEAR	·	11 km	MPC · JPL
29581	1998 FR_{55}	—	March 20, 1998	Socorro	LINEAR	·	7.8 km	MPC · JPL
29582	1998 FR_{58}	—	March 20, 1998	Socorro	LINEAR	·	13 km	MPC · JPL
29583	1998 FA_{60}	—	March 20, 1998	Socorro	LINEAR	THM	9.3 km	MPC · JPL
29584	1998 FQ_{60}	—	March 20, 1998	Socorro	LINEAR	THM	9.6 km	MPC · JPL
29585 Johnhale	1998 FD_{64}	Johnhale	March 20, 1998	Socorro	LINEAR	·	7.1 km	MPC · JPL
29586	1998 FT_{66}	—	March 20, 1998	Socorro	LINEAR	·	8.7 km	MPC · JPL
29587	1998 FR_{69}	—	March 20, 1998	Socorro	LINEAR	·	9.6 km	MPC · JPL
29588	1998 FM_{71}	—	March 20, 1998	Socorro	LINEAR	·	16 km	MPC · JPL
29589	1998 FV_{98}	—	March 31, 1998	Socorro	LINEAR	·	6.0 km	MPC · JPL
29590	1998 FR_{115}	—	March 31, 1998	Socorro	LINEAR	·	6.0 km	MPC · JPL
29591	1998 FK_{121}	—	March 20, 1998	Socorro	LINEAR	3:2	20 km	MPC · JPL
29592	1998 FP_{123}	—	March 20, 1998	Socorro	LINEAR	·	7.8 km	MPC · JPL
29593	1998 FA_{129}	—	March 22, 1998	Socorro	LINEAR	·	13 km	MPC · JPL
29594	1998 GK_{8}	—	April 2, 1998	Socorro	LINEAR	·	13 km	MPC · JPL
29595	1998 HL_{14}	—	April 26, 1998	Haleakala	NEAT	·	21 km	MPC · JPL
29596	1998 HO_{32}	—	April 20, 1998	Socorro	LINEAR	·	9.1 km	MPC · JPL
29597	1998 HT_{37}	—	April 20, 1998	Socorro	LINEAR	·	14 km	MPC · JPL
29598	1998 HB_{62}	—	April 21, 1998	Socorro	LINEAR	·	8.1 km	MPC · JPL
29599	1998 HZ_{119}	—	April 23, 1998	Socorro	LINEAR	·	8.1 km	MPC · JPL
29600	1998 HP_{134}	—	April 19, 1998	Socorro	LINEAR	EOS	7.0 km	MPC · JPL

== 29601–29700 ==
back to top

Designation			Discovery			Properties		Ref
Permanent	Provisional	Named after	Date	Site	Discoverer(s)	Category	Diam.	Ref
29601	1998 KK_{31}	—	May 22, 1998	Socorro	LINEAR	·	9.0 km	MPC · JPL
29602	1998 LA_{2}	—	June 1, 1998	La Silla	E. W. Elst	·	2.9 km	MPC · JPL
29603	1998 MO_{44}	—	June 19, 1998	Socorro	LINEAR	L5	33 km	MPC · JPL
29604	1998 QX_{5}	—	August 24, 1998	Caussols	ODAS	·	3.9 km	MPC · JPL
29605 Joshuacolwell	1998 QF_{54}	Joshuacolwell	August 27, 1998	Anderson Mesa	LONEOS	·	2.1 km	MPC · JPL
29606	1998 QN_{94}	—	August 17, 1998	Socorro	LINEAR	PHO	2.8 km	MPC · JPL
29607 Jakehecla	1998 QZ_{97}	Jakehecla	August 28, 1998	Socorro	LINEAR	·	2.0 km	MPC · JPL
29608	1998 RP_{50}	—	September 14, 1998	Socorro	LINEAR	·	1.4 km	MPC · JPL
29609 Claudiahuang	1998 RY_{54}	Claudiahuang	September 14, 1998	Socorro	LINEAR	GEF	3.7 km	MPC · JPL
29610 Iyengar	1998 RO_{60}	Iyengar	September 14, 1998	Socorro	LINEAR	·	2.4 km	MPC · JPL
29611	1998 RO_{77}	—	September 14, 1998	Socorro	LINEAR	·	1.5 km	MPC · JPL
29612 Cindyjiang	1998 RR_{77}	Cindyjiang	September 14, 1998	Socorro	LINEAR	·	2.7 km	MPC · JPL
29613 Charlespicard	1998 SB_{2}	Charlespicard	September 16, 1998	Prescott	P. G. Comba	·	2.1 km	MPC · JPL
29614 Sheller	1998 SR_{35}	Sheller	September 22, 1998	Caussols	ODAS	·	1.8 km	MPC · JPL
29615	1998 SL_{47}	—	September 26, 1998	Kitt Peak	Spacewatch	·	2.6 km	MPC · JPL
29616	1998 SG_{64}	—	September 20, 1998	La Silla	E. W. Elst	·	3.7 km	MPC · JPL
29617	1998 SK_{108}	—	September 26, 1998	Socorro	LINEAR	·	2.4 km	MPC · JPL
29618 Jinandrew	1998 SL_{124}	Jinandrew	September 26, 1998	Socorro	LINEAR	·	4.7 km	MPC · JPL
29619 Kapurubandage	1998 SO_{134}	Kapurubandage	September 26, 1998	Socorro	LINEAR	(2076)	2.2 km	MPC · JPL
29620 Gurbanikaur	1998 SM_{140}	Gurbanikaur	September 26, 1998	Socorro	LINEAR	·	1.9 km	MPC · JPL
29621	1998 SY_{141}	—	September 26, 1998	Socorro	LINEAR	·	1.6 km	MPC · JPL
29622	1998 SM_{145}	—	September 20, 1998	La Silla	E. W. Elst	·	4.5 km	MPC · JPL
29623	1998 SR_{164}	—	September 30, 1998	Xinglong	SCAP	·	8.0 km	MPC · JPL
29624 Sugiyama	1998 TA	Sugiyama	October 2, 1998	Mishima	M. Akiyama	V	4.2 km	MPC · JPL
29625	1998 TF_{7}	—	October 14, 1998	Caussols	ODAS	·	4.7 km	MPC · JPL
29626	1998 TV_{12}	—	October 13, 1998	Kitt Peak	Spacewatch	NYS ·	4.0 km	MPC · JPL
29627	1998 TX_{12}	—	October 13, 1998	Kitt Peak	Spacewatch	·	3.0 km	MPC · JPL
29628 Fedorets	1998 TX_{30}	Fedorets	October 10, 1998	Anderson Mesa	LONEOS	·	3.9 km	MPC · JPL
29629	1998 UP_{16}	—	October 26, 1998	Višnjan Observatory	K. Korlević	·	2.3 km	MPC · JPL
29630	1998 UN_{32}	—	October 29, 1998	Xinglong	SCAP	EUN	4.1 km	MPC · JPL
29631 Ryankenny	1998 UV_{35}	Ryankenny	October 28, 1998	Socorro	LINEAR	·	1.8 km	MPC · JPL
29632 Yaejikim	1998 UR_{44}	Yaejikim	October 19, 1998	Anderson Mesa	LONEOS	·	1.5 km	MPC · JPL
29633 Weatherwax	1998 VH_{2}	Weatherwax	November 10, 1998	Caussols	ODAS	(2076)	3.1 km	MPC · JPL
29634 Sabrinaaksil	1998 VB_{3}	Sabrinaaksil	November 10, 1998	Caussols	ODAS	KOR	5.3 km	MPC · JPL
29635	1998 VP_{5}	—	November 9, 1998	Gekko	T. Kagawa	·	2.7 km	MPC · JPL
29636	1998 VH_{6}	—	November 11, 1998	Nachi-Katsuura	Y. Shimizu, T. Urata	·	2.7 km	MPC · JPL
29637	1998 VN_{11}	—	November 10, 1998	Socorro	LINEAR	·	5.0 km	MPC · JPL
29638 Eeshakhare	1998 VX_{19}	Eeshakhare	November 10, 1998	Socorro	LINEAR	(2076)	2.8 km	MPC · JPL
29639	1998 VO_{22}	—	November 10, 1998	Socorro	LINEAR	·	1.7 km	MPC · JPL
29640	1998 VQ_{22}	—	November 10, 1998	Socorro	LINEAR	·	2.8 km	MPC · JPL
29641 Kaikloepfer	1998 VA_{26}	Kaikloepfer	November 10, 1998	Socorro	LINEAR	·	1.7 km	MPC · JPL
29642 Archiekong	1998 VY_{27}	Archiekong	November 10, 1998	Socorro	LINEAR	·	2.2 km	MPC · JPL
29643 Plücker	1998 VR_{31}	Plücker	November 15, 1998	Prescott	P. G. Comba	·	2.4 km	MPC · JPL
29644	1998 VA_{33}	—	November 11, 1998	Chichibu	N. Satō	NYS	3.4 km	MPC · JPL
29645 Kutsenok	1998 VX_{37}	Kutsenok	November 10, 1998	Socorro	LINEAR	·	1.7 km	MPC · JPL
29646 Polya	1998 WJ	Polya	November 16, 1998	Prescott	P. G. Comba	·	1.3 km	MPC · JPL
29647 Poncelet	1998 WY	Poncelet	November 17, 1998	Prescott	P. G. Comba	NYS	2.6 km	MPC · JPL
29648	1998 WM_{3}	—	November 19, 1998	Oizumi	T. Kobayashi	·	4.2 km	MPC · JPL
29649	1998 WP_{6}	—	November 23, 1998	Oizumi	T. Kobayashi	(5)	4.1 km	MPC · JPL
29650 Toldy	1998 WR_{6}	Toldy	November 23, 1998	Modra	A. Galád, P. Kolény	·	2.1 km	MPC · JPL
29651	1998 WA_{9}	—	November 22, 1998	Fair Oaks Ranch	J. V. McClusky	·	2.0 km	MPC · JPL
29652	1998 WD_{9}	—	November 26, 1998	Višnjan Observatory	K. Korlević	·	3.5 km	MPC · JPL
29653	1998 WG_{9}	—	November 27, 1998	Višnjan Observatory	K. Korlević	·	2.3 km	MPC · JPL
29654 Michaellaue	1998 WW_{9}	Michaellaue	November 18, 1998	Socorro	LINEAR	·	3.3 km	MPC · JPL
29655 Yarimlee	1998 WH_{10}	Yarimlee	November 21, 1998	Socorro	LINEAR	·	2.6 km	MPC · JPL
29656 Leejoseph	1998 WA_{12}	Leejoseph	November 21, 1998	Socorro	LINEAR	·	6.4 km	MPC · JPL
29657 Andreali	1998 WD_{12}	Andreali	November 21, 1998	Socorro	LINEAR	NYS	2.9 km	MPC · JPL
29658 Henrylin	1998 WR_{17}	Henrylin	November 21, 1998	Socorro	LINEAR	·	3.0 km	MPC · JPL
29659 Zeyuliu	1998 WY_{17}	Zeyuliu	November 21, 1998	Socorro	LINEAR	·	2.1 km	MPC · JPL
29660 Jessmacalpine	1998 WE_{20}	Jessmacalpine	November 18, 1998	Socorro	LINEAR	·	2.0 km	MPC · JPL
29661	1998 WT_{20}	—	November 18, 1998	Socorro	LINEAR	·	3.9 km	MPC · JPL
29662	1998 WD_{23}	—	November 18, 1998	Socorro	LINEAR	·	2.4 km	MPC · JPL
29663 Evanmackay	1998 WH_{23}	Evanmackay	November 18, 1998	Socorro	LINEAR	·	1.9 km	MPC · JPL
29664	1998 WY_{23}	—	November 25, 1998	Socorro	LINEAR	EUN	6.0 km	MPC · JPL
29665	1998 WD_{24}	—	November 25, 1998	Socorro	LINEAR	slow	21 km	MPC · JPL
29666	1998 WC_{31}	—	November 28, 1998	Višnjan Observatory	K. Korlević	(2076)	2.9 km	MPC · JPL
29667	1998 XF	—	December 1, 1998	Xinglong	SCAP	·	8.4 km	MPC · JPL
29668 Ipf	1998 XO	Ipf	December 9, 1998	Kleť	M. Tichý	·	4.4 km	MPC · JPL
29669	1998 XZ_{3}	—	December 11, 1998	Oizumi	T. Kobayashi	·	3.8 km	MPC · JPL
29670	1998 XS_{4}	—	December 12, 1998	Oizumi	T. Kobayashi	EUN	7.1 km	MPC · JPL
29671	1998 XX_{8}	—	December 9, 1998	Višnjan Observatory	K. Korlević	NYS	2.1 km	MPC · JPL
29672 Salvo	1998 XG_{9}	Salvo	December 12, 1998	San Marcello	A. Boattini, L. Tesi	NYS	3.4 km	MPC · JPL
29673	1998 XK_{11}	—	December 13, 1998	Oizumi	T. Kobayashi	·	3.3 km	MPC · JPL
29674 Raušal	1998 XO_{12}	Raušal	December 15, 1998	Ondřejov	P. Pravec	·	1.5 km	MPC · JPL
29675 Ippolitonievo	1998 XV_{15}	Ippolitonievo	December 15, 1998	Farra d'Isonzo	Farra d'Isonzo	·	3.0 km	MPC · JPL
29676	1998 XW_{15}	—	December 14, 1998	Socorro	LINEAR	PHO	3.6 km	MPC · JPL
29677	1998 XL_{17}	—	December 15, 1998	Bédoin	P. Antonini	·	2.9 km	MPC · JPL
29678	1998 XZ_{18}	—	December 10, 1998	Kitt Peak	Spacewatch	·	1.6 km	MPC · JPL
29679	1998 XF_{23}	—	December 11, 1998	Kitt Peak	Spacewatch	·	3.1 km	MPC · JPL
29680	1998 XM_{27}	—	December 14, 1998	Socorro	LINEAR	V	4.1 km	MPC · JPL
29681 Saramanshad	1998 XT_{47}	Saramanshad	December 14, 1998	Socorro	LINEAR	·	3.1 km	MPC · JPL
29682	1998 XR_{48}	—	December 14, 1998	Socorro	LINEAR	V	3.7 km	MPC · JPL
29683	1998 XO_{50}	—	December 14, 1998	Socorro	LINEAR	·	3.0 km	MPC · JPL
29684	1998 XF_{51}	—	December 14, 1998	Socorro	LINEAR	·	4.4 km	MPC · JPL
29685 Soibamansoor	1998 XG_{53}	Soibamansoor	December 14, 1998	Socorro	LINEAR	V	2.5 km	MPC · JPL
29686 Raymondmaung	1998 XO_{53}	Raymondmaung	December 14, 1998	Socorro	LINEAR	V	2.1 km	MPC · JPL
29687 Mohdreza	1998 XL_{78}	Mohdreza	December 15, 1998	Socorro	LINEAR	·	2.0 km	MPC · JPL
29688	1998 XM_{92}	—	December 15, 1998	Socorro	LINEAR	·	5.1 km	MPC · JPL
29689	1998 XY_{93}	—	December 15, 1998	Socorro	LINEAR	·	3.0 km	MPC · JPL
29690 Nistala	1998 XM_{94}	Nistala	December 15, 1998	Socorro	LINEAR	·	4.1 km	MPC · JPL
29691 Ramónallerulloa	1998 XH_{96}	Ramónallerulloa	December 11, 1998	Mérida	Naranjo, O. A.	GEF	5.0 km	MPC · JPL
29692 Černis	1998 XE_{97}	Černis	December 11, 1998	Mérida	Naranjo, O. A.	·	2.6 km	MPC · JPL
29693	1998 YC	—	December 16, 1998	Višnjan Observatory	K. Korlević	·	2.4 km	MPC · JPL
29694	1998 YG	—	December 16, 1998	Višnjan Observatory	K. Korlević	·	7.5 km	MPC · JPL
29695	1998 YH	—	December 16, 1998	Višnjan Observatory	K. Korlević	·	4.3 km	MPC · JPL
29696 Distasio	1998 YN	Distasio	December 16, 1998	Caussols	ODAS	DOR	10 km	MPC · JPL
29697	1998 YR_{1}	—	December 16, 1998	Višnjan Observatory	K. Korlević	·	12 km	MPC · JPL
29698	1998 YE_{3}	—	December 17, 1998	Oizumi	T. Kobayashi	·	3.7 km	MPC · JPL
29699	1998 YF_{4}	—	December 19, 1998	Oizumi	T. Kobayashi	·	2.7 km	MPC · JPL
29700 Salmon	1998 YU_{5}	Salmon	December 19, 1998	Prescott	P. G. Comba	·	2.1 km	MPC · JPL

== 29701–29800 ==
back to top

Designation			Discovery			Properties		Ref
Permanent	Provisional	Named after	Date	Site	Discoverer(s)	Category	Diam.	Ref
29701 Peggyhaas	1998 YT_{6}	Peggyhaas	December 20, 1998	Catalina	CSS	·	4.6 km	MPC · JPL
29702	1998 YY_{6}	—	December 23, 1998	Farra d'Isonzo	Farra d'Isonzo	·	5.9 km	MPC · JPL
29703	1998 YL_{7}	—	December 22, 1998	Oizumi	T. Kobayashi	·	3.1 km	MPC · JPL
29704	1998 YB_{9}	—	December 23, 1998	Xinglong	SCAP	·	1.9 km	MPC · JPL
29705 Cialucy	1998 YP_{10}	Cialucy	December 26, 1998	San Marcello	A. Boattini, L. Tesi	·	5.6 km	MPC · JPL
29706 Simonetta	1998 YS_{11}	Simonetta	December 25, 1998	San Marcello	A. Boattini, L. Tesi	·	2.9 km	MPC · JPL
29707	1998 YU_{14}	—	December 22, 1998	Kitt Peak	Spacewatch	·	3.4 km	MPC · JPL
29708	1998 YQ_{15}	—	December 22, 1998	Kitt Peak	Spacewatch	·	2.7 km	MPC · JPL
29709	1999 AF_{2}	—	January 9, 1999	Oizumi	T. Kobayashi	NYS	3.7 km	MPC · JPL
29710	1999 AK_{2}	—	January 9, 1999	Oizumi	T. Kobayashi	·	3.4 km	MPC · JPL
29711	1999 AU_{5}	—	January 12, 1999	Oizumi	T. Kobayashi	TEL	4.2 km	MPC · JPL
29712	1999 AX_{6}	—	January 9, 1999	Višnjan Observatory	K. Korlević	·	2.4 km	MPC · JPL
29713	1999 AK_{7}	—	January 10, 1999	Višnjan Observatory	K. Korlević	V	2.7 km	MPC · JPL
29714	1999 AL_{7}	—	January 10, 1999	Višnjan Observatory	K. Korlević	V	2.2 km	MPC · JPL
29715	1999 AW_{7}	—	January 13, 1999	Oizumi	T. Kobayashi	·	5.9 km	MPC · JPL
29716	1999 AY_{7}	—	January 13, 1999	Oizumi	T. Kobayashi	slow	3.2 km	MPC · JPL
29717	1999 AC_{8}	—	January 13, 1999	Oizumi	T. Kobayashi	·	2.6 km	MPC · JPL
29718	1999 AH_{18}	—	January 11, 1999	Kitt Peak	Spacewatch	·	6.0 km	MPC · JPL
29719	1999 AF_{19}	—	January 13, 1999	Kitt Peak	Spacewatch	·	17 km	MPC · JPL
29720	1999 AC_{20}	—	January 13, 1999	Kitt Peak	Spacewatch	·	2.7 km	MPC · JPL
29721	1999 AC_{21}	—	January 13, 1999	Gekko	T. Kagawa	V	1.8 km	MPC · JPL
29722 Chrisgraham	1999 AQ_{23}	Chrisgraham	January 14, 1999	Anderson Mesa	LONEOS	·	6.9 km	MPC · JPL
29723	1999 AD_{24}	—	January 14, 1999	Višnjan Observatory	Višnjan	PHO	3.5 km	MPC · JPL
29724	1999 AP_{24}	—	January 15, 1999	Caussols	ODAS	·	4.7 km	MPC · JPL
29725 Mikewest	1999 AC_{25}	Mikewest	January 15, 1999	Caussols	ODAS	·	8.6 km	MPC · JPL
29726	1999 AH_{26}	—	January 9, 1999	Uenohara	N. Kawasato	·	4.1 km	MPC · JPL
29727	1999 AC_{34}	—	January 15, 1999	Kitt Peak	Spacewatch	·	2.0 km	MPC · JPL
29728 Averbeck	1999 AM_{34}	Averbeck	January 14, 1999	Anderson Mesa	LONEOS	·	3.0 km	MPC · JPL
29729	1999 BY_{1}	—	January 18, 1999	Socorro	LINEAR	PHO	4.3 km	MPC · JPL
29730 Bethwestfall	1999 BE_{2}	Bethwestfall	January 18, 1999	Catalina	CSS	PHO	4.7 km	MPC · JPL
29731	1999 BY_{2}	—	January 19, 1999	Oizumi	T. Kobayashi	·	6.3 km	MPC · JPL
29732	1999 BZ_{2}	—	January 19, 1999	Oizumi	T. Kobayashi	·	6.5 km	MPC · JPL
29733	1999 BA_{4}	—	January 18, 1999	Gekko	T. Kagawa	slow	3.5 km	MPC · JPL
29734	1999 BP_{5}	—	January 21, 1999	Višnjan Observatory	K. Korlević	·	2.2 km	MPC · JPL
29735	1999 BR_{6}	—	January 21, 1999	Caussols	ODAS	·	10 km	MPC · JPL
29736 Fichtelberg	1999 BE_{7}	Fichtelberg	January 21, 1999	Drebach	J. Kandler	V	2.0 km	MPC · JPL
29737 Norihiro	1999 BG_{7}	Norihiro	January 21, 1999	Kuma Kogen	A. Nakamura	GEF	3.5 km	MPC · JPL
29738 Ivobudil	1999 BT_{8}	Ivobudil	January 23, 1999	Kleť	J. Tichá, M. Tichý	·	2.6 km	MPC · JPL
29739	1999 BM_{9}	—	January 16, 1999	Woomera	F. B. Zoltowski	·	2.9 km	MPC · JPL
29740	1999 BS_{9}	—	January 19, 1999	Črni Vrh	J. Skvarč, B. Dintinjana	·	5.6 km	MPC · JPL
29741	1999 BM_{10}	—	January 24, 1999	Višnjan Observatory	K. Korlević	·	2.6 km	MPC · JPL
29742	1999 BQ_{12}	—	January 24, 1999	Črni Vrh	Mikuž, H.	·	9.9 km	MPC · JPL
29743	1999 BM_{15}	—	January 26, 1999	Višnjan Observatory	K. Korlević	EUN	3.3 km	MPC · JPL
29744	1999 BG_{20}	—	January 16, 1999	Socorro	LINEAR	MAR	4.3 km	MPC · JPL
29745 Mareknovak	1999 BM_{20}	Mareknovak	January 16, 1999	Socorro	LINEAR	·	3.0 km	MPC · JPL
29746	1999 BB_{25}	—	January 18, 1999	Socorro	LINEAR	·	2.8 km	MPC · JPL
29747 Acorlando	1999 BJ_{25}	Acorlando	January 18, 1999	Socorro	LINEAR	·	3.3 km	MPC · JPL
29748	1999 BZ_{31}	—	January 19, 1999	Kitt Peak	Spacewatch	·	2.5 km	MPC · JPL
29749	1999 CN	—	February 5, 1999	Oizumi	T. Kobayashi	·	2.9 km	MPC · JPL
29750 Chleborad	1999 CA_{3}	Chleborad	February 8, 1999	Fountain Hills	C. W. Juels	·	5.7 km	MPC · JPL
29751	1999 CE_{4}	—	February 9, 1999	Woomera	F. B. Zoltowski	·	5.2 km	MPC · JPL
29752	1999 CG_{4}	—	February 10, 1999	Woomera	F. B. Zoltowski	·	2.7 km	MPC · JPL
29753 Silvo	1999 CY_{4}	Silvo	February 10, 1999	Gnosca	S. Sposetti	·	7.1 km	MPC · JPL
29754	1999 CE_{5}	—	February 12, 1999	Oohira	T. Urata	·	2.9 km	MPC · JPL
29755	1999 CT_{5}	—	February 12, 1999	Oizumi	T. Kobayashi	·	4.3 km	MPC · JPL
29756	1999 CW_{5}	—	February 12, 1999	Oizumi	T. Kobayashi	(5)	4.1 km	MPC · JPL
29757	1999 CH_{8}	—	February 13, 1999	Oizumi	T. Kobayashi	ADE	13 km	MPC · JPL
29758	1999 CN_{8}	—	February 13, 1999	Oizumi	T. Kobayashi	EUN	5.8 km	MPC · JPL
29759	1999 CR_{8}	—	February 12, 1999	Višnjan Observatory	K. Korlević	·	3.0 km	MPC · JPL
29760 Milevsko	1999 CM_{10}	Milevsko	February 15, 1999	Kleť	Kleť	·	6.5 km	MPC · JPL
29761 Lorenzo	1999 CJ_{16}	Lorenzo	February 13, 1999	Montelupo	M. Tombelli, Bartolini, S.	·	2.4 km	MPC · JPL
29762 Panasiewicz	1999 CK_{17}	Panasiewicz	February 10, 1999	Socorro	LINEAR	·	3.2 km	MPC · JPL
29763	1999 CH_{20}	—	February 10, 1999	Socorro	LINEAR	·	6.8 km	MPC · JPL
29764 Panneerselvam	1999 CC_{23}	Panneerselvam	February 10, 1999	Socorro	LINEAR	·	3.6 km	MPC · JPL
29765 Miparedes	1999 CG_{23}	Miparedes	February 10, 1999	Socorro	LINEAR	·	5.8 km	MPC · JPL
29766	1999 CL_{24}	—	February 10, 1999	Socorro	LINEAR	·	4.9 km	MPC · JPL
29767	1999 CO_{24}	—	February 10, 1999	Socorro	LINEAR	·	9.2 km	MPC · JPL
29768	1999 CZ_{27}	—	February 10, 1999	Socorro	LINEAR	·	6.0 km	MPC · JPL
29769	1999 CE_{28}	—	February 10, 1999	Socorro	LINEAR	ADE	24 km	MPC · JPL
29770 Timmpiper	1999 CT_{28}	Timmpiper	February 10, 1999	Socorro	LINEAR	·	3.0 km	MPC · JPL
29771	1999 CA_{31}	—	February 10, 1999	Socorro	LINEAR	THM	7.0 km	MPC · JPL
29772 Portocarrero	1999 CH_{31}	Portocarrero	February 10, 1999	Socorro	LINEAR	AGN	5.2 km	MPC · JPL
29773 Samuelpritt	1999 CH_{34}	Samuelpritt	February 10, 1999	Socorro	LINEAR	·	8.0 km	MPC · JPL
29774	1999 CL_{44}	—	February 10, 1999	Socorro	LINEAR	·	2.1 km	MPC · JPL
29775	1999 CO_{45}	—	February 10, 1999	Socorro	LINEAR	·	5.5 km	MPC · JPL
29776 Radzhabov	1999 CV_{45}	Radzhabov	February 10, 1999	Socorro	LINEAR	·	4.2 km	MPC · JPL
29777	1999 CK_{46}	—	February 10, 1999	Socorro	LINEAR	·	7.7 km	MPC · JPL
29778	1999 CO_{48}	—	February 10, 1999	Socorro	LINEAR	·	4.3 km	MPC · JPL
29779	1999 CK_{49}	—	February 10, 1999	Socorro	LINEAR	·	5.0 km	MPC · JPL
29780	1999 CJ_{50}	—	February 10, 1999	Socorro	LINEAR	·	2.3 km	MPC · JPL
29781	1999 CL_{50}	—	February 10, 1999	Socorro	LINEAR	NYS	3.5 km	MPC · JPL
29782	1999 CN_{50}	—	February 10, 1999	Socorro	LINEAR	EUN	3.6 km	MPC · JPL
29783 Sanjanarane	1999 CU_{50}	Sanjanarane	February 10, 1999	Socorro	LINEAR	NYS	3.1 km	MPC · JPL
29784	1999 CD_{51}	—	February 10, 1999	Socorro	LINEAR	·	12 km	MPC · JPL
29785	1999 CD_{55}	—	February 10, 1999	Socorro	LINEAR	·	4.2 km	MPC · JPL
29786	1999 CO_{57}	—	February 10, 1999	Socorro	LINEAR	·	4.2 km	MPC · JPL
29787 Timrenier	1999 CR_{57}	Timrenier	February 10, 1999	Socorro	LINEAR	·	5.1 km	MPC · JPL
29788 Rachelrossi	1999 CG_{60}	Rachelrossi	February 12, 1999	Socorro	LINEAR	·	3.6 km	MPC · JPL
29789	1999 CD_{64}	—	February 12, 1999	Socorro	LINEAR	MAR	5.0 km	MPC · JPL
29790	1999 CW_{64}	—	February 12, 1999	Socorro	LINEAR	EUN	4.6 km	MPC · JPL
29791	1999 CC_{65}	—	February 12, 1999	Socorro	LINEAR	EUN	5.6 km	MPC · JPL
29792	1999 CG_{65}	—	February 12, 1999	Socorro	LINEAR	EOS	6.2 km	MPC · JPL
29793	1999 CH_{65}	—	February 12, 1999	Socorro	LINEAR	·	12 km	MPC · JPL
29794	1999 CC_{67}	—	February 12, 1999	Socorro	LINEAR	·	7.4 km	MPC · JPL
29795	1999 CL_{71}	—	February 12, 1999	Socorro	LINEAR	MRX	5.0 km	MPC · JPL
29796	1999 CW_{77}	—	February 12, 1999	Socorro	LINEAR	·	4.9 km	MPC · JPL
29797	1999 CC_{78}	—	February 12, 1999	Socorro	LINEAR	EUN	5.5 km	MPC · JPL
29798	1999 CP_{79}	—	February 12, 1999	Socorro	LINEAR	EUN	6.3 km	MPC · JPL
29799 Trinirussell	1999 CZ_{81}	Trinirussell	February 12, 1999	Socorro	LINEAR	EOS	4.8 km	MPC · JPL
29800 Valeriesarge	1999 CM_{84}	Valeriesarge	February 10, 1999	Socorro	LINEAR	V	2.7 km	MPC · JPL

== 29801–29900 ==
back to top

Designation			Discovery			Properties		Ref
Permanent	Provisional	Named after	Date	Site	Discoverer(s)	Category	Diam.	Ref
29801	1999 CX_{84}	—	February 10, 1999	Socorro	LINEAR	·	4.1 km	MPC · JPL
29802 Rikhavshah	1999 CD_{86}	Rikhavshah	February 10, 1999	Socorro	LINEAR	·	5.0 km	MPC · JPL
29803 Michaelshao	1999 CQ_{87}	Michaelshao	February 10, 1999	Socorro	LINEAR	·	2.8 km	MPC · JPL
29804 Idansharon	1999 CH_{90}	Idansharon	February 10, 1999	Socorro	LINEAR	NYS	6.5 km	MPC · JPL
29805 Bradleysloop	1999 CK_{91}	Bradleysloop	February 10, 1999	Socorro	LINEAR	(2076)	2.6 km	MPC · JPL
29806 Eviesobczak	1999 CQ_{98}	Eviesobczak	February 10, 1999	Socorro	LINEAR	·	5.0 km	MPC · JPL
29807	1999 CR_{99}	—	February 10, 1999	Socorro	LINEAR	·	6.3 km	MPC · JPL
29808 Youssoliman	1999 CK_{100}	Youssoliman	February 10, 1999	Socorro	LINEAR	(5)	3.3 km	MPC · JPL
29809	1999 CQ_{103}	—	February 12, 1999	Socorro	LINEAR	·	7.4 km	MPC · JPL
29810	1999 CF_{106}	—	February 12, 1999	Socorro	LINEAR	·	3.7 km	MPC · JPL
29811	1999 CK_{109}	—	February 12, 1999	Socorro	LINEAR	ADE	7.0 km	MPC · JPL
29812 Aaronsolomon	1999 CS_{110}	Aaronsolomon	February 12, 1999	Socorro	LINEAR	·	2.7 km	MPC · JPL
29813	1999 CF_{111}	—	February 12, 1999	Socorro	LINEAR	AGN	4.3 km	MPC · JPL
29814	1999 CU_{111}	—	February 12, 1999	Socorro	LINEAR	·	6.7 km	MPC · JPL
29815	1999 CG_{112}	—	February 12, 1999	Socorro	LINEAR	WAT	5.1 km	MPC · JPL
29816	1999 CS_{113}	—	February 12, 1999	Socorro	LINEAR	EOS	5.9 km	MPC · JPL
29817	1999 CG_{117}	—	February 12, 1999	Socorro	LINEAR	·	3.7 km	MPC · JPL
29818 Aryosorayya	1999 CM_{117}	Aryosorayya	February 12, 1999	Socorro	LINEAR	·	3.3 km	MPC · JPL
29819	1999 CD_{128}	—	February 11, 1999	Socorro	LINEAR	·	20 km	MPC · JPL
29820	1999 CW_{149}	—	February 13, 1999	Kitt Peak	Spacewatch	THM	9.5 km	MPC · JPL
29821	1999 DP_{1}	—	February 17, 1999	Nachi-Katsuura	Y. Shimizu, T. Urata	EUN	7.0 km	MPC · JPL
29822	1999 DS_{2}	—	February 19, 1999	Zeno	T. Stafford	·	4.5 km	MPC · JPL
29823	1999 DS_{3}	—	February 20, 1999	Nachi-Katsuura	Y. Shimizu, T. Urata	slow	7.3 km	MPC · JPL
29824 Kalmančok	1999 DU_{3}	Kalmančok	February 23, 1999	Modra	Kornoš, L., Tóth	THM	5.0 km	MPC · JPL
29825 Dunyazade	1999 DB_{4}	Dunyazade	February 20, 1999	Goodricke-Pigott	R. A. Tucker	·	3.2 km	MPC · JPL
29826	1999 DW_{6}	—	February 23, 1999	Socorro	LINEAR	·	4.8 km	MPC · JPL
29827 Chrisbennett	1999 DQ_{7}	Chrisbennett	February 18, 1999	Anderson Mesa	LONEOS	·	6.4 km	MPC · JPL
29828	1999 DU_{8}	—	February 16, 1999	Kitt Peak	Spacewatch	·	2.3 km	MPC · JPL
29829 Engels	1999 EK_{3}	Engels	March 14, 1999	Monte Agliale	Santangelo, M. M. M.	·	6.3 km	MPC · JPL
29830	1999 ER_{4}	—	March 14, 1999	Višnjan Observatory	K. Korlević	·	12 km	MPC · JPL
29831	1999 EV_{4}	—	March 13, 1999	Woomera	F. B. Zoltowski	·	7.9 km	MPC · JPL
29832 Steinwehr	1999 EA_{12}	Steinwehr	March 15, 1999	Socorro	LINEAR	·	4.1 km	MPC · JPL
29833	1999 FJ	—	March 16, 1999	Višnjan Observatory	K. Korlević, M. Jurić	·	5.4 km	MPC · JPL
29834 Mariacallas	1999 FE_{1}	Mariacallas	March 17, 1999	Caussols	ODAS	KOR	5.2 km	MPC · JPL
29835	1999 FW_{1}	—	March 16, 1999	Kitt Peak	Spacewatch	·	3.1 km	MPC · JPL
29836	1999 FB_{4}	—	March 16, 1999	Kitt Peak	Spacewatch	·	2.5 km	MPC · JPL
29837 Savage	1999 FP_{5}	Savage	March 21, 1999	Prescott	P. G. Comba	EOS	6.6 km	MPC · JPL
29838	1999 FA_{7}	—	March 20, 1999	Caussols	ODAS	THM	7.0 km	MPC · JPL
29839 Russhoward	1999 FA_{9}	Russhoward	March 19, 1999	Anderson Mesa	LONEOS	THM	7.6 km	MPC · JPL
29840	1999 FV_{12}	—	March 18, 1999	Kitt Peak	Spacewatch	·	9.5 km	MPC · JPL
29841	1999 FO_{14}	—	March 19, 1999	Kitt Peak	Spacewatch	(29841)	4.2 km	MPC · JPL
29842 Marilynsoper	1999 FE_{18}	Marilynsoper	March 20, 1999	Anderson Mesa	LONEOS	·	8.0 km	MPC · JPL
29843 Brucesoper	1999 FJ_{19}	Brucesoper	March 22, 1999	Anderson Mesa	LONEOS	·	8.4 km	MPC · JPL
29844 Millette	1999 FM_{19}	Millette	March 22, 1999	Anderson Mesa	LONEOS	·	5.1 km	MPC · JPL
29845 Wykrota	1999 FE_{21}	Wykrota	March 22, 1999	Wykrota	C. Jacques	PHO	3.8 km	MPC · JPL
29846	1999 FT_{23}	—	March 19, 1999	Socorro	LINEAR	·	9.2 km	MPC · JPL
29847	1999 FC_{24}	—	March 19, 1999	Socorro	LINEAR	·	7.5 km	MPC · JPL
29848	1999 FL_{24}	—	March 19, 1999	Socorro	LINEAR	HYG	11 km	MPC · JPL
29849	1999 FJ_{25}	—	March 19, 1999	Socorro	LINEAR	EOS	5.6 km	MPC · JPL
29850 Tanakagyou	1999 FQ_{25}	Tanakagyou	March 19, 1999	Socorro	LINEAR	·	4.8 km	MPC · JPL
29851	1999 FW_{25}	—	March 19, 1999	Socorro	LINEAR	KOR	6.4 km	MPC · JPL
29852 Niralithakor	1999 FD_{26}	Niralithakor	March 19, 1999	Socorro	LINEAR	MRX	3.5 km	MPC · JPL
29853	1999 FZ_{26}	—	March 19, 1999	Socorro	LINEAR	·	12 km	MPC · JPL
29854	1999 FK_{27}	—	March 19, 1999	Socorro	LINEAR	·	6.3 km	MPC · JPL
29855	1999 FN_{27}	—	March 19, 1999	Socorro	LINEAR	·	8.1 km	MPC · JPL
29856	1999 FA_{28}	—	March 19, 1999	Socorro	LINEAR	·	6.8 km	MPC · JPL
29857	1999 FS_{28}	—	March 19, 1999	Socorro	LINEAR	KOR	5.4 km	MPC · JPL
29858 Tlomak	1999 FC_{31}	Tlomak	March 19, 1999	Socorro	LINEAR	AGN	5.5 km	MPC · JPL
29859	1999 FW_{31}	—	March 19, 1999	Socorro	LINEAR	·	8.9 km	MPC · JPL
29860	1999 FO_{34}	—	March 19, 1999	Socorro	LINEAR	·	9.4 km	MPC · JPL
29861	1999 FV_{36}	—	March 20, 1999	Socorro	LINEAR	·	13 km	MPC · JPL
29862 Savannahjoy	1999 FF_{37}	Savannahjoy	March 20, 1999	Socorro	LINEAR	·	2.6 km	MPC · JPL
29863	1999 FC_{43}	—	March 20, 1999	Socorro	LINEAR	·	6.4 km	MPC · JPL
29864	1999 FM_{44}	—	March 20, 1999	Socorro	LINEAR	ADE	7.1 km	MPC · JPL
29865	1999 FL_{45}	—	March 20, 1999	Socorro	LINEAR	·	17 km	MPC · JPL
29866	1999 FR_{46}	—	March 20, 1999	Socorro	LINEAR	KOR	4.5 km	MPC · JPL
29867	1999 FA_{55}	—	March 20, 1999	Socorro	LINEAR	·	8.0 km	MPC · JPL
29868	1999 FB_{56}	—	March 20, 1999	Socorro	LINEAR	·	4.8 km	MPC · JPL
29869 Chiarabarbara	1999 GC_{1}	Chiarabarbara	April 4, 1999	San Marcello	A. Boattini, G. D'Abramo	·	6.7 km	MPC · JPL
29870	1999 GV_{4}	—	April 11, 1999	Fountain Hills	C. W. Juels	·	6.6 km	MPC · JPL
29871	1999 GE_{5}	—	April 7, 1999	Nachi-Katsuura	Y. Shimizu, T. Urata	GEF	5.9 km	MPC · JPL
29872	1999 GO_{6}	—	April 15, 1999	Reedy Creek	J. Broughton	·	5.9 km	MPC · JPL
29873 Bertachini	1999 GG_{9}	Bertachini	April 10, 1999	Anderson Mesa	LONEOS	·	3.0 km	MPC · JPL
29874 Rogerculver	1999 GV_{9}	Rogerculver	April 14, 1999	Goodricke-Pigott	R. A. Tucker	RAF	3.0 km	MPC · JPL
29875	1999 GY_{14}	—	April 14, 1999	Kitt Peak	Spacewatch	·	7.6 km	MPC · JPL
29876	1999 GR_{16}	—	April 15, 1999	Socorro	LINEAR	·	8.5 km	MPC · JPL
29877	1999 GL_{17}	—	April 15, 1999	Socorro	LINEAR	·	13 km	MPC · JPL
29878	1999 GY_{19}	—	April 15, 1999	Socorro	LINEAR	·	5.4 km	MPC · JPL
29879	1999 GO_{21}	—	April 15, 1999	Socorro	LINEAR	EOS	9.9 km	MPC · JPL
29880 Andytran	1999 GQ_{28}	Andytran	April 7, 1999	Socorro	LINEAR	THM	7.3 km	MPC · JPL
29881 Tschopp	1999 GO_{29}	Tschopp	April 7, 1999	Socorro	LINEAR	THM	6.5 km	MPC · JPL
29882	1999 GU_{30}	—	April 7, 1999	Socorro	LINEAR	·	5.3 km	MPC · JPL
29883	1999 GB_{31}	—	April 7, 1999	Socorro	LINEAR	EOS	7.1 km	MPC · JPL
29884	1999 GF_{31}	—	April 7, 1999	Socorro	LINEAR	·	5.2 km	MPC · JPL
29885	1999 GN_{31}	—	April 7, 1999	Socorro	LINEAR	·	6.0 km	MPC · JPL
29886 Randytung	1999 GQ_{31}	Randytung	April 7, 1999	Socorro	LINEAR	NYS · slow	3.8 km	MPC · JPL
29887	1999 GN_{34}	—	April 6, 1999	Socorro	LINEAR	·	4.6 km	MPC · JPL
29888	1999 GJ_{36}	—	April 7, 1999	Socorro	LINEAR	TEL	5.3 km	MPC · JPL
29889	1999 GN_{36}	—	April 12, 1999	Socorro	LINEAR	·	4.0 km	MPC · JPL
29890	1999 GH_{37}	—	April 12, 1999	Socorro	LINEAR	slow	14 km	MPC · JPL
29891	1999 GQ_{37}	—	April 12, 1999	Socorro	LINEAR	VER	14 km	MPC · JPL
29892	1999 GS_{37}	—	April 12, 1999	Socorro	LINEAR	·	5.4 km	MPC · JPL
29893	1999 GW_{37}	—	April 12, 1999	Socorro	LINEAR	EUN	5.0 km	MPC · JPL
29894	1999 GD_{39}	—	April 12, 1999	Socorro	LINEAR	·	7.0 km	MPC · JPL
29895 Sarafaggi	1999 GP_{53}	Sarafaggi	April 11, 1999	Anderson Mesa	LONEOS	·	18 km	MPC · JPL
29896	1999 GN_{58}	—	April 7, 1999	Socorro	LINEAR	·	7.1 km	MPC · JPL
29897 Kossen	1999 GM_{61}	Kossen	April 7, 1999	Anderson Mesa	LONEOS	·	12 km	MPC · JPL
29898 Richardnugent	1999 HG_{1}	Richardnugent	April 19, 1999	Reedy Creek	J. Broughton	·	9.5 km	MPC · JPL
29899	1999 HU_{1}	—	April 20, 1999	Bergisch Gladbach	W. Bickel	·	3.7 km	MPC · JPL
29900	1999 HP_{5}	—	April 17, 1999	Kitt Peak	Spacewatch	EOS	5.4 km	MPC · JPL

== 29901–30000 ==
back to top

Designation			Discovery			Properties		Ref
Permanent	Provisional	Named after	Date	Site	Discoverer(s)	Category	Diam.	Ref
29901	1999 HS_{7}	—	April 19, 1999	Kitt Peak	Spacewatch	·	4.5 km	MPC · JPL
29902	1999 HM_{8}	—	April 16, 1999	Socorro	LINEAR	·	8.3 km	MPC · JPL
29903	1999 HP_{9}	—	April 17, 1999	Socorro	LINEAR	615	8.6 km	MPC · JPL
29904	1999 HL_{10}	—	April 17, 1999	Socorro	LINEAR	·	11 km	MPC · JPL
29905 Kunitaka	1999 HQ_{11}	Kunitaka	April 21, 1999	Nanyo	T. Okuni	·	9.8 km	MPC · JPL
29906	1999 HF_{12}	—	April 16, 1999	Socorro	LINEAR	·	6.8 km	MPC · JPL
29907	1999 JD	—	May 1, 1999	Monte Agliale	Ziboli, M.	EUN	3.8 km	MPC · JPL
29908	1999 JP_{3}	—	May 6, 1999	Socorro	LINEAR	MAR	5.9 km	MPC · JPL
29909	1999 JE_{8}	—	May 12, 1999	Socorro	LINEAR	PHO	4.3 km	MPC · JPL
29910 Segre	1999 JV_{8}	Segre	May 14, 1999	Prescott	P. G. Comba	EOS	6.7 km	MPC · JPL
29911	1999 JQ_{9}	—	May 8, 1999	Catalina	CSS	·	4.4 km	MPC · JPL
29912	1999 JQ_{10}	—	May 8, 1999	Catalina	CSS	EUN	7.2 km	MPC · JPL
29913	1999 JO_{12}	—	May 8, 1999	Catalina	CSS	EOS	7.2 km	MPC · JPL
29914	1999 JH_{15}	—	May 15, 1999	Catalina	CSS	·	12 km	MPC · JPL
29915	1999 JG_{18}	—	May 10, 1999	Socorro	LINEAR	·	10 km	MPC · JPL
29916	1999 JP_{18}	—	May 10, 1999	Socorro	LINEAR	(5)	3.2 km	MPC · JPL
29917	1999 JP_{19}	—	May 10, 1999	Socorro	LINEAR	EOS	8.8 km	MPC · JPL
29918	1999 JV_{20}	—	May 10, 1999	Socorro	LINEAR	THM	14 km	MPC · JPL
29919	1999 JD_{23}	—	May 10, 1999	Socorro	LINEAR	EOS	9.3 km	MPC · JPL
29920	1999 JB_{26}	—	May 10, 1999	Socorro	LINEAR	slow	6.5 km	MPC · JPL
29921	1999 JE_{26}	—	May 10, 1999	Socorro	LINEAR	MAR	3.4 km	MPC · JPL
29922	1999 JZ_{27}	—	May 10, 1999	Socorro	LINEAR	·	14 km	MPC · JPL
29923	1999 JE_{28}	—	May 10, 1999	Socorro	LINEAR	·	4.5 km	MPC · JPL
29924	1999 JN_{28}	—	May 10, 1999	Socorro	LINEAR	EOS	6.5 km	MPC · JPL
29925	1999 JV_{28}	—	May 10, 1999	Socorro	LINEAR	EOS	8.3 km	MPC · JPL
29926	1999 JW_{32}	—	May 10, 1999	Socorro	LINEAR	EOS	9.0 km	MPC · JPL
29927	1999 JE_{35}	—	May 10, 1999	Socorro	LINEAR	·	5.5 km	MPC · JPL
29928	1999 JX_{35}	—	May 10, 1999	Socorro	LINEAR	EOS	7.1 km	MPC · JPL
29929	1999 JR_{39}	—	May 10, 1999	Socorro	LINEAR	(1298)	8.4 km	MPC · JPL
29930	1999 JT_{41}	—	May 10, 1999	Socorro	LINEAR	fast	6.9 km	MPC · JPL
29931	1999 JL_{44}	—	May 10, 1999	Socorro	LINEAR	URS	20 km	MPC · JPL
29932	1999 JB_{46}	—	May 10, 1999	Socorro	LINEAR	·	9.6 km	MPC · JPL
29933	1999 JG_{46}	—	May 10, 1999	Socorro	LINEAR	·	6.8 km	MPC · JPL
29934	1999 JL_{46}	—	May 10, 1999	Socorro	LINEAR	·	13 km	MPC · JPL
29935	1999 JH_{48}	—	May 10, 1999	Socorro	LINEAR	·	3.9 km	MPC · JPL
29936	1999 JD_{49}	—	May 10, 1999	Socorro	LINEAR	·	17 km	MPC · JPL
29937	1999 JB_{50}	—	May 10, 1999	Socorro	LINEAR	GEF	4.8 km	MPC · JPL
29938	1999 JR_{52}	—	May 10, 1999	Socorro	LINEAR	KOR	4.3 km	MPC · JPL
29939	1999 JS_{52}	—	May 10, 1999	Socorro	LINEAR	·	8.7 km	MPC · JPL
29940	1999 JK_{73}	—	May 12, 1999	Socorro	LINEAR	EOS	4.8 km	MPC · JPL
29941	1999 JB_{76}	—	May 10, 1999	Socorro	LINEAR	·	9.7 km	MPC · JPL
29942	1999 JJ_{77}	—	May 12, 1999	Socorro	LINEAR	EOS	7.1 km	MPC · JPL
29943	1999 JZ_{78}	—	May 13, 1999	Socorro	LINEAR	·	40 km	MPC · JPL
29944	1999 JF_{80}	—	May 12, 1999	Socorro	LINEAR	T_{j} (2.98) · 3:2	16 km	MPC · JPL
29945	1999 JU_{83}	—	May 12, 1999	Socorro	LINEAR	·	15 km	MPC · JPL
29946	1999 JZ_{83}	—	May 12, 1999	Socorro	LINEAR	VER	11 km	MPC · JPL
29947	1999 JD_{84}	—	May 12, 1999	Socorro	LINEAR	·	8.0 km	MPC · JPL
29948	1999 JS_{84}	—	May 12, 1999	Socorro	LINEAR	URS	14 km	MPC · JPL
29949	1999 JM_{85}	—	May 15, 1999	Socorro	LINEAR	·	8.8 km	MPC · JPL
29950 Uppili	1999 JA_{86}	Uppili	May 12, 1999	Socorro	LINEAR	NYS	2.3 km	MPC · JPL
29951	1999 JH_{86}	—	May 12, 1999	Socorro	LINEAR	·	11 km	MPC · JPL
29952 Varghese	1999 JL_{86}	Varghese	May 12, 1999	Socorro	LINEAR	RAF	3.2 km	MPC · JPL
29953	1999 JW_{86}	—	May 12, 1999	Socorro	LINEAR	EOS	6.9 km	MPC · JPL
29954	1999 JK_{89}	—	May 12, 1999	Socorro	LINEAR	·	5.2 km	MPC · JPL
29955	1999 JE_{90}	—	May 12, 1999	Socorro	LINEAR	EOS	5.4 km	MPC · JPL
29956	1999 JF_{91}	—	May 12, 1999	Socorro	LINEAR	·	15 km	MPC · JPL
29957	1999 JR_{91}	—	May 12, 1999	Socorro	LINEAR	EOS	8.3 km	MPC · JPL
29958	1999 JY_{91}	—	May 12, 1999	Socorro	LINEAR	·	4.8 km	MPC · JPL
29959 Senevelling	1999 JJ_{92}	Senevelling	May 12, 1999	Socorro	LINEAR	615	5.4 km	MPC · JPL
29960	1999 JU_{92}	—	May 12, 1999	Socorro	LINEAR	EOS	6.3 km	MPC · JPL
29961	1999 JB_{99}	—	May 12, 1999	Socorro	LINEAR	AEG	9.8 km	MPC · JPL
29962	1999 JA_{100}	—	May 12, 1999	Socorro	LINEAR	slow	12 km	MPC · JPL
29963	1999 JH_{100}	—	May 12, 1999	Socorro	LINEAR	(1101)	12 km	MPC · JPL
29964	1999 JO_{100}	—	May 12, 1999	Socorro	LINEAR	·	11 km	MPC · JPL
29965	1999 JX_{102}	—	May 13, 1999	Socorro	LINEAR	HYG	7.3 km	MPC · JPL
29966	1999 JW_{103}	—	May 13, 1999	Socorro	LINEAR	CYB	11 km	MPC · JPL
29967	1999 JN_{104}	—	May 15, 1999	Socorro	LINEAR	·	4.5 km	MPC · JPL
29968	1999 JE_{106}	—	May 13, 1999	Socorro	LINEAR	EOS	5.4 km	MPC · JPL
29969 Amyvitha	1999 JX_{109}	Amyvitha	May 13, 1999	Socorro	LINEAR	KOR	3.7 km	MPC · JPL
29970	1999 KQ	—	May 16, 1999	Catalina	CSS	·	5.1 km	MPC · JPL
29971	1999 KT	—	May 16, 1999	Catalina	CSS	·	1.6 km	MPC · JPL
29972 Chriswan	1999 KO_{11}	Chriswan	May 18, 1999	Socorro	LINEAR	EOS	10 km	MPC · JPL
29973	1999 LP_{7}	—	June 12, 1999	Kitt Peak	Spacewatch	3:2 · SHU	10 km	MPC · JPL
29974	1999 LV_{8}	—	June 8, 1999	Socorro	LINEAR	GEF	4.4 km	MPC · JPL
29975 Racheledelstein	1999 LQ_{32}	Racheledelstein	June 8, 1999	Anderson Mesa	LONEOS	·	7.6 km	MPC · JPL
29976	1999 NE_{9}	—	July 13, 1999	Socorro	LINEAR	L5	34 km	MPC · JPL
29977	1999 NH_{11}	—	July 13, 1999	Socorro	LINEAR	L5	33 km	MPC · JPL
29978 Arthurwang	1999 NN_{13}	Arthurwang	July 14, 1999	Socorro	LINEAR	NYS	2.8 km	MPC · JPL
29979 Wastyk	1999 RN_{83}	Wastyk	September 7, 1999	Socorro	LINEAR	·	3.4 km	MPC · JPL
29980 Dougsimons	1999 SV_{6}	Dougsimons	September 30, 1999	Fountain Hills	C. W. Juels	·	2.9 km	MPC · JPL
29981	1999 TD_{10}	—	October 3, 1999	Kitt Peak	Spacewatch	centaur	104 km	MPC · JPL
29982 Sarahwu	1999 TT_{31}	Sarahwu	October 4, 1999	Socorro	LINEAR	·	2.1 km	MPC · JPL
29983 Amyxu	1999 VS_{61}	Amyxu	November 4, 1999	Socorro	LINEAR	·	7.9 km	MPC · JPL
29984 Zefferer	1999 VC_{79}	Zefferer	November 4, 1999	Socorro	LINEAR	·	2.4 km	MPC · JPL
29985	1999 VX_{153}	—	November 10, 1999	Catalina	CSS	·	6.4 km	MPC · JPL
29986 Shunsuke	1999 XW_{37}	Shunsuke	December 3, 1999	Kuma Kogen	A. Nakamura	·	2.7 km	MPC · JPL
29987 Lazhang	1999 XO_{49}	Lazhang	December 7, 1999	Socorro	LINEAR	·	2.5 km	MPC · JPL
29988 Davidezilli	1999 XR_{99}	Davidezilli	December 7, 1999	Socorro	LINEAR	·	3.7 km	MPC · JPL
29989	1999 XS_{204}	—	December 12, 1999	Socorro	LINEAR	·	4.8 km	MPC · JPL
29990	1999 XR_{208}	—	December 13, 1999	Socorro	LINEAR	·	5.8 km	MPC · JPL
29991 Dazimmerman	2000 AC_{38}	Dazimmerman	January 3, 2000	Socorro	LINEAR	·	4.0 km	MPC · JPL
29992 Yasminezubi	2000 AY_{39}	Yasminezubi	January 3, 2000	Socorro	LINEAR	·	3.6 km	MPC · JPL
29993	2000 AD_{55}	—	January 4, 2000	Socorro	LINEAR	THM	9.2 km	MPC · JPL
29994 Zuoyu	2000 AC_{61}	Zuoyu	January 4, 2000	Socorro	LINEAR	V	2.8 km	MPC · JPL
29995 Arshavsky	2000 AO_{97}	Arshavsky	January 4, 2000	Socorro	LINEAR	·	5.4 km	MPC · JPL
29996	2000 AQ_{97}	—	January 4, 2000	Socorro	LINEAR	H	1.5 km	MPC · JPL
29997	2000 AE_{127}	—	January 5, 2000	Socorro	LINEAR	·	6.6 km	MPC · JPL
29998	2000 AG_{137}	—	January 4, 2000	Socorro	LINEAR	·	2.1 km	MPC · JPL
29999	2000 AT_{137}	—	January 4, 2000	Socorro	LINEAR	·	5.2 km	MPC · JPL
30000 Camenzind	2000 AB_{138}	Camenzind	January 4, 2000	Socorro	LINEAR	·	2.6 km	MPC · JPL

back to top

== See also ==
- Meanings of minor-planet names: 29001–30000
