= Meanings of minor-planet names: 29001–30000 =

As minor planet discoveries are confirmed, they are given a permanent number by the IAU's Minor Planet Center (MPC), and the discoverers can then submit names for them, following the IAU's naming conventions. The list below concerns those minor planets in the specified number-range that have received names, and explains the meanings of those names.

Official naming citations of newly named small Solar System bodies are approved and published in a bulletin by IAU's Working Group for Small Bodies Nomenclature (WGSBN). Before May 2021, citations were published in MPC's Minor Planet Circulars for many decades. Recent citations can also be found on the JPL Small-Body Database (SBDB). Until his death in 2016, German astronomer Lutz D. Schmadel compiled these citations into the Dictionary of Minor Planet Names (DMP) and regularly updated the collection.

Based on Paul Herget's The Names of the Minor Planets, Schmadel also researched the unclear origin of numerous asteroids, most of which had been named prior to World War II. This article incorporates text from this source, which is in the public domain: SBDB New namings may only be added to this list below after official publication as the preannouncement of names is condemned. The WGSBN publishes a comprehensive guideline for the naming rules of non-cometary small Solar System bodies.

== 29001–29100 ==
Named minor planet	Provisional	This minor planet was named for...	Ref · Catalog
29053 Muskau	4466 T-2	Park von Muskau, astride the Neisse River between Poland and Germany	JPL · 29053
29080 Astrocourier	1978 RK	The Eurasian Astronomical Society (EAAS), which was founded in 1990. It comprises professional astronomers from the former Soviet republics, Europe, Israel and the United States.	JPL · 29080
29081 Krymradio	1978 SC_{5}	The "Crimean radio", on the occasion of the 80th anniversary. It broadcasts in seven languages. The naming also honors its tireless employees, high-quality experts, winners of international prizes and competitions of journalistic skill	JPL · 29081
29085 Sethanne	1979 SD	Sethanne Howard (born 1944), American astronomer, chief of the U.S. Nautical Almanac Office 2000–2003	JPL · 29085

== 29101–29200 ==
back to top

Named minor planet	Provisional	This minor planet was named for...	Ref · Catalog
29122 Vasadze	1982 YR_{1}	Tariel Vasadze (born 1947), Ukrainian automotive inventor	JPL · 29122
29125 Kyivphysfak	1984 YL_{1}	"Kyiv physics faculty" of the Kyiv National Taras Shevchenko University	JPL · 29125
29127 Karnath	1985 FF_{2}	Nicole M. Karnath (b. 1987), an American astronomer.	IAU · 29127
29132 Bradpitt	1987 BP_{1}	Brad Pitt (born 1963), American actor	JPL · 29132
29133 Vargas	1987 KH_{5}	Norman ("Norm") L. Vargas (born 1972), American amateur astronomer who assisted in organizing the photographic glass plate archive of the 1.2-m Schmidt Oschin Telescope at Palomar Observatory	JPL · 29133
29137 Alanboss	1987 UY_{1}	Alan Boss, American astrophysicist	JPL · 29137
29144 Taitokufuji	1988 FB	Fuji Elementary School, located in Taito-ku in Tokyo, Japan.	JPL · 29144
29146 McHone	1988 FN	John F. McHone (born 1944), American geologist, oceanographer and planetary scientist	JPL · 29146
29148 Palzer	1988 JE	Wolfgang Palzer, German astronomer	JPL · 29148
29157 Higashinihon	1989 ET_{1}	"Higashi Nihon" (East Japan) was struck by one of the most destructive earthquakes in history on 2011 Mar. 11. The whole nation has risen to the task of reconstruction with the spirit of "Ganbarou" ("do your best and don't give up").	JPL · 29157
29159 Asakawa	1989 GB	Kanichi Asakawa (1873-1948), Japanese historian and professor at Yale university.	JPL · 29159
29160 São Paulo	1989 SP_{1}	São Paulo is a city located in south-eastern Brazil. It was founded as a small village in 1554 by Jesuits, and became the capital of the province in 1681. Prior to arrival of the Portuguese, the area was occupied by the Tupi people.	IAU · 29160
29167 Masataka	1989 WC_{2}	Masataka Takagi (born 1962), professor at Kochi University of Technology.	IAU · 29167
29185 Reich	1990 TG_{8}	Ludwig Reich (born 1940), Austrian professor of mathematics at the Karl-Franzens-Universität Graz (University of Graz), editor of several international mathematical journals, and a member of the Österreichische Akademie der Wissenschaften (Austrian Academy of Sciences)	JPL · 29185
29186 Lake Tekapo	1990 UD_{2}	Lake Tekapo, located near the Southern Alps on New Zealand's South Island, is known for its breath-taking scenery. It is home to Canterbury University's Mt John Observatory and is a major centre for astro-tourism	JPL · 29186
29187 Le Monnier	1990 US_{3}	Pierre Charles Le Monnier (1715–1799), French astronomer	JPL · 29187
29189 Udinsk	1990 UY_{3}	Udinsk (Ulan-Ude), capital of the Buryat Republic of Siberia	JPL · 29189
29193 Dolphyn	1990 WD_{1}	Willem Dolphyn (1935–2016), a Flemish painter and illustrator, and the son of realistic painter and portrait artist Victor Dolphyn †	JPL · 29193
29196 Dius	1990 YY	Dius was the brother of Hektor and Paris, sons of Priamus, the king of Troy during the Trojan War.	JPL · 29196
29197 Gleim	1991 AQ_{2}	Johann Wilhelm Ludwig Gleim (1719–1803), German poet, nicknamed "Father Gleim" for his patronage	JPL · 29197
29198 Weathers	1991 DW	Del Weathers (1951–2003), American engineering and design team leader for Space Station Freedom	JPL · 29198
29199 Himeji	1991 FZ	Himeji Castle is the symbol of the city and both Japan's national treasure and a World Heritage site. It was also the hometown of Hideo Hirose, former director of Tokyo Astronomical Observatory	JPL · 29199

== 29201–29300 ==
back to top

Named minor planet	Provisional	This minor planet was named for...	Ref · Catalog
29203 Schnitger	1991 GS_{10}	Arp Schnitger (1648–1719), German organ builder	JPL · 29203
29204 Ladegast	1991 GB_{11}	Friedrich Ladegast (1818–1905), German organ builder	JPL · 29204
29208 Halorentz	1991 RT_{2}	Hendrik Lorentz (1853–1928), Dutch physicist and Nobelist	JPL · 29208
29210 Robertbrown	1991 RB_{12}	Robert Brown (1773–1858) was a Scottish botanist who made important contributions to botany largely through his pioneering use of the microscope. In 1827, while examining grains of pollen from the plant Clarka Pulchella in water under a microscope, he discovered Brownian motion.	JPL · 29210
29212 Zeeman	1991 RA_{41}	Pieter Zeeman (1865–1943), Dutch physicist and Nobelist ‡	JPL · 29212
29214 Apitzsch	1991 TL_{6}	Rolf Apitzsch (born 1943) is a German amateur astronomer and discoverer of minor planets at his Wildberg observatory.	JPL · 29214
29220 Xavierbaptista	1992 BC_{2}	Francisco Xavier Baptista (1730–1797) was a Portuguese composer from Lisbon where he was the first organist at the Cathedral of St. Mary. He wrote many harpsichord sonatas, toccatas and minuets that can also be played easily on the organ.	JPL · 29220
29227 Wegener	1992 DY_{13}	Alfred Wegener (1880–1930), German geophysicist, and creator of the theory of continental drift	JPL · 29227
29244 Van Damme	1992 OV_{1}	Jozef Van Damme (1912–), Dutch teacher and literary historian	JPL · 29244
29246 Clausius	1992 RV	Rudolf Clausius (1822–1888), German physicist and mathematician	JPL · 29246
29249 Hiraizumi	1992 SN_{12}	Hiraizumi, a Japanese town in Iwate prefecture, which reached the height of its prosperity during the twelfth century as the home of the Fujiwara family in Oshu province. The Golden Hall (Konjikido) of Chusonji and the ruins of Motsuji temple are reminiscent of its glory	JPL · 29249
29250 Helmutmoritz	1992 SO_{17}	Helmut Moritz (born 1933) is the most prominent Austrian professor of physical geodesy, a member of the Austrian Academy of Sciences and of many other international academies and societies. Moritz published more than 200 important papers and books on the gravitational field and the rotation of the earth	JPL · 29250
29251 Hosokawa	1992 UH_{4}	Yasuhiko Hosokawa (born 1957), Japanese amateur astronomer and member of the Oriental Astronomical Association and the Astronomical Society of Shikoku.	JPL · 29251
29252 Konjikido	1993 BY_{2}	Konjikido, the Golden Hall of Chusonji Temple in Iwate prefecture, was built in 1124 by Fujiwara Kiyohira. It is typical Heian period Amida hall architecture and covered with gold throughout. The coffins of the three successive heads of the Northern Fujiwara family who ruled the region are stored under the altars	JPL · 29252
29292 Conniewalker	1993 KZ_{1}	Connie Walker (born 1957), American astronomer	JPL · 29292
29298 Cruls	1993 SA_{14}	Luis Cruls (1848–1908), a Belgian-born Brazilian astronomer and geodesist.	JPL · 29298
29299 Kazama	1993 TW_{1}	Seiji Kazama (born 1962), Japanese amateur astronomer.	JPL · 29299

== 29301–29400 ==
back to top

Named minor planet	Provisional	This minor planet was named for...	Ref · Catalog
29307 Torbernbergman	1993 TB_{39}	Swedish chemist and mineralogist Torbern Olof Bergman (1735–1784) developed a mineral classification scheme based on chemical characteristics and appearance. His Dissertation on Elective Attractions (1775) contains the largest chemical affinity table ever published	JPL · 29307
29311 Lesire	1994 BQ_{3}	Though suffering severely from hardness of hearing from an early age and moving from one school to another, Louise Lesire (born 1990) managed by extreme perseverance and help from her parents and teachers to finish high school successfully. She plans now to proceed with kinesitherapy in Ghent	JPL · 29311
29314 Eurydamas	1994 CR_{18}	Eurydamas, a Trojan priest and an interpreter of dreams	JPL · 29314
29328 Hanshintigers	1994 TU_{14}	Hanshin Tigers, Japanese baseball club	JPL · 29328
29329 Knobelsdorff	1994 TN_{16}	Georg Wenzeslaus von Knobelsdorff, German painter and architect	JPL · 29329
29337 Hakurojo	1995 AE_{1}	Himeji Castle, in Hyogo prefecture, is Japan's National Treasure, also known as Hakurojo or White Heron Castle, because of its beauty and likeness to a white heron. This symbol of Himeji City was registered as a World Cultural Heritage site, the first in Japan, in Dec. 1993	JPL · 29337
29345 Ivandanilov	1995 DS_{1}	Ivan Vasil'evich Danilov (1952–1998), Russian bell-ringer	JPL · 29345
29346 Mariadina	1995 DB_{13}	Maria Dina Mannozzi, Italian midwife in Montelupo	JPL · 29346
29347 Natta	1995 EU	Giulio Natta (1903–1979), an Italian academic chemist and winner of the Nobel prize for chemistry in 1963.	JPL · 29347
29348 Criswick	1995 FD	John Criswick (born 1963), Canadian astronomy benefactor †	MPC · 29348
29353 Manu	1995 OG	Manuela Vedovelli (born 1969), an Italian astronomer and friend of Andrea Boattini who co-discovered this minor planet.	MPC · 29353
29355 Siratakayama	1995 QX_{3}	Siratakayama volcano, Yamagata prefecture, Japan	JPL · 29355
29356 Giovarduino	1995 SY_{29}	Giovanni Arduino (1714–1795) was an Italian geologist, often described as the "Father of Italian Geology".	JPL · 29356
29361 Botticelli	1996 CY	Sandro Botticelli (1445–1510), Italian painter	JPL · 29361
29362 Azumakofuzi	1996 CY_{2}	Azumakofuzi, a 1707-meter mountain located in the Bandai-Asahi National Park, in the eastern part of the Azuma mountain range.	JPL · 29362
29363 Ghigabartolini	1996 CW_{8}	Ludovica "Ghiga" Bartolini (born 2016) is the granddaughter of Italian amateur astronomer Maura Tombelli, who co-discovered this minor planet.	IAU · 29363
29373 Hamanowa	1996 GP_{2}	Hiromi Hamanowa (born 1953), a Japanese amateur astronomer	JPL · 29373
29374 Kazumitsu	1996 GZ_{2}	Kazumitsu Date (1927–1953) became a science teacher of a junior high school in 1948, and taught astronomy not only to his pupils but also to other teachers. In 1951 he went on to Tokyo University with the hopes of becoming a professional astronomer.	JPL · 29374
29391 Knight	1996 MB	Kent Knight (1920–1994) was a founding member and former president of the Fort Bend Astronomy Club in Texas.	MPC · 29391
29394 Hirokohamanowa	1996 NR_{5}	Hiroko Hamanowa (born 1960), a Japanese amateur astronomer.	JPL · 29394

== 29401–29500 ==
back to top

Named minor planet	Provisional	This minor planet was named for...	Ref · Catalog
29401 Astérix	1996 TE	Astérix is a famous comic strip character by French artists Albert Uderzo and René Goscinny.	MPC · 29401
29402 Obélix	1996 TT_{9}	Obélix is a famous comic strip character by French artists Albert Uderzo and René Goscinny.	MPC · 29402
29404 Hikarusato	1996 TS_{14}	Hikaru Sato (born 1951) is a Japanese amateur astronomer, observer of minor-planet occultations, and secretary general of the Fukushima Astronomical Society.	JPL · 29404
29408 Katoyuko	1996 VJ_{5}	Yuko Kato (born 1971), Japanese amateur astronomer.	JPL · 29408
29419 Mládková	1997 AD_{18}	Meda Mládková (born 1919), a Czech art historian and benefactor.	JPL · 29419
29420 Ikuo	1997 AT_{18}	Ikuo Sato, the discoverer's brother	JPL · 29420
29427 Oswaldthomas	1997 EJ_{11}	Oswald Thomas (1882–1963) was an Austrian astronomer and popularizer of astronomy, who founded the Astronomical Bureau and Astronomical Society in Vienna	MPC · 29427
29428 Ettoremajorana	1997 FM_{1}	Ettore Majorana, Italian theoretical physicist.	JPL · 29428
29430 Mimiyen	1997 GG_{22}	Mimi Yen (born 1994) is a finalist in the 2012 Intel Science Talent Search, a science competition for high-school seniors, for her animal-sciences project.	JPL · 29430
29431 Shijimi	1997 GA_{26}	Shijimi is a popular clam in Japan. The name was proposed by children who attended the Fureai Space Festival 2002, held in Matsue on Space Day in Japan.	JPL · 29431
29432 Williamscott	1997 GP_{34}	William Scott mentored a finalist in the 2012 Intel Science Talent Search, a science competition for high-school seniors.	JPL · 29432
29435 Mordell	1997 JB_{8}	Louis Joel Mordell, American-British mathematician	JPL · 29435
29437 Marchais	1997 LG_{1}	Denis Marchais, French amateur astronomer	JPL · 29437
29438 Zhengjia	1997 MV	The Zhengjia museums are located in Guangzhou, southern China. Dedicated to science education, the museums started educational astronomy programs with the National Astronomical Observatories operated by the Chinese Academy of Sciences.	IAU · 29438
29439 Maxfabiani	1997 MQ_{1}	Maximilian Fabiani (1865–1962), commonly known as Max Fabiani, was a central European architect and urban planner of mixed Italian-Austrian ancestry. He designed remarkable buildings in Vienna, Ljubljana, Trieste and Gorizia.	JPL · 29439
29443 Remocorti	1997 NM_{10}	Remo Corti, Italian amateur astronomer and telescope maker	JPL · 29443
29446 Gouguenheim	1997 PX	Lucienne Gouguenheim (born 1935) is a French radio astronomer at Meudon Observatory, who taught at Orsay University from 1962 to 2005. Observing the 21-cm line of galaxies, she helped reconcile the then-divergent values of the Hubble constant. She is a founding member of the Comité de Liaison Enseignants et Astronomes	JPL · 29446
29447 Jerzyneyman	1997 PY_{2}	Jerzy Neyman, Poland-born American mathematician	JPL · 29447
29448 Pappos	1997 QJ	Pappos of Alexandria, Greek mathematician	JPL · 29448
29449 Taharbenjelloun	1997 QR_{2}	Tahar Ben Jelloun (born 1944) is a Moroccan writer, poet and essayist, who writes exclusively in French.	JPL · 29449
29450 Tomohiroohno	1997 QZ_{2}	Tomohiro Ohno (born 1983) is the sub-director of Hoshinomura Observatory in Fukushima prefecture in Japan. With his father, the director of the Hoshinomura Observatory, he observes the universe and contributes to the popularization of astronomy by frequent NHK television and radio appearances	JPL · 29450
29456 Evakrchová	1997 SN_{2}	Eva Krchová, Slovak amateur astronomer	JPL · 29456
29457 Marcopolo	1997 SO_{4}	Marco Polo, Venetian explorer	JPL · 29457
29458 Pearson	1997 SJ_{11}	Karl Pearson, British mathematician	JPL · 29458
29463 Benjaminpeirce	1997 TB	Benjamin Peirce, American mathematician	JPL · 29463
29464 Leonmiš	1997 TY_{9}	Leon Miš, Czech amateur astronomer †	MPC · 29464
29467 Shandongdaxue	1997 TS_{26}	Shandong University, China	JPL · 29467
29470 Higgs	1997 UC_{7}	Peter Higgs, Scottish physicist.	JPL · 29470
29471 Spejbl	1997 UT_{7}	Spejbl, a marionette, father of Hurvínek †	MPC · 29471
29472 Hurvínek	1997 UV_{7}	Hurvínek, a mischievous marionette, son of Spejbl †	MPC · 29472
29473 Krejčí	1997 UE_{8}	František Krejčí, founder of the popular observatory in Karlovy Vary in the Czech Republic †	MPC · 29473
29474 Toyoshima	1997 UT_{8}	Naoki Toyoshima (born 1957), Japanese amateur astronomer and director of the Jododaira Astronomical Observatory in Fukushima.	MPC · 29474
29476 Kvíčala	1997 UX_{14}	Jan Kvíčala, Czech lawyer and amateur astronomer †	MPC · 29476
29477 Zdíkšíma	1997 UE_{15}	Zdislav Šíma, Czech astronomer † ‡	MPC · 29477
29483 Boeker	1997 VD_{5}	Karolin Kleemann-Boeker (born 1966) and Andreas Boeker (1964–2011), longtime German amateur astronomers, interested in astrometry and astrophotography, and cofounders of Turtle Star Observatory. Boeker was also experienced in building observatories and constructing telescope mounts	JPL · 29483
29484 Honzaveselý	1997 VJ_{6}	Jan Veselý, Czech cyclist †	MPC · 29484
29490 Myslbek	1997 WX	Josef Václav Myslbek, Czech sculptor †	MPC · 29490
29491 Pfaff	1997 WB_{1}	Jean-Marie Pfaff, Belgian football player †	MPC · 29491

== 29501–29600 ==
back to top

Named minor planet	Provisional	This minor planet was named for...	Ref · Catalog
29508 Bottinelli	1997 XR_{8}	Lucette Bottinelli (1937–2015) was a French radio astronomer from Meudon Observatory, who taught at Orsay University from 1962 to 2005.	JPL · 29508
29509 Kuangtingyun	1997 YK_{1}	Kuang Tingyun, plant physiologist and an Academician of the Chinese Academy of Sciences.	IAU · 29509
29514 Karatsu	1997 YV_{6}	Karatsu, a city in Saga Prefecture on the island of Kyushu, Japan.	JPL · 29514
29528 Kaplinski	1998 AN_{8}	Jaan Kaplinski (1941–2021) was an Estonian writer, philosopher, and culture critic. He published numerous collections of poems, prose and essays. He was also an amateur astronomer and wrote a popular astronomy book	JPL · 29528
29547 Yurimazzanti	1998 BA_{34}	Yuri Mazzanti (born 1999) has been an observer since he was young. He has been an active member of the Gruppo Astrofili Montelupo for the last 10 years, and has been involved in both research and outreach.	JPL · 29547
29549 Sandrasbaragli	1998 BB_{44}	Alessandra Sbaragli, the daughter-in-law of the first discoverer.	IAU · 29549
29550 Yaribartolini	1998 BE_{44}	Yari Bartolini (b. 2018), is a grandson of the first discoverer.	IAU · 29550
29552 Chern	1998 CS_{2}	Shiing-shen Chern, Chinese-American mathematician and educator	JPL · 29552
29555 MACEK	1998 DP	MACEK, Czech micro-accelerometer satellite instrument	MPC · 29555
29561 Iatteri	1998 DU_{10}	Giampiero Iatteri, Italian amateur astronomer	JPL · 29561
29562 Danmacdonald	1998 DM_{14}	Daniel R. MacDonald, American astrophysicist	JPL · 29562
29565 Glenngould	1998 FD	Glenn Gould, Canadian pianist †	MPC · 29565
29568 Gobbi-Belcredi	1998 FG_{16}	Gerolamo Gobbi-Belcredi (1820–1899) was a student at the astronomical observatory of Modena during 1841–1848. He observed comets and minor planets and calculated their orbits. He became professor of physics at the University of Genoa and Parma and later professor of geodesy at the University of Pavia	JPL · 29568
29575 Gundlapalli	1998 FM_{51}	Prithvi Gundlapalli (born 1995) was awarded second place in the 2013 Intel International Science and Engineering Fair for his chemistry project.	JPL · 29575
29585 Johnhale	1998 FD_{64}	John Edward Hale (born 1995) was awarded first place in the 2013 Intel International Science and Engineering Fair for his environmental management team project.	JPL · 29585

== 29601–29700 ==
back to top

Named minor planet	Provisional	This minor planet was named for...	Ref · Catalog
29605 Joshuacolwell	1998 QF_{54}	Joshua Colwell (born 1964) is a Pegasus Professor of Physics at the University of Central Florida (Orlando, Florida) whose studies include the structure and dynamics of Saturn's rings, the behavior of materials in microgravity, and the electrostatic charging of lunar and asteroid regoliths.	IAU · 29605
29607 Jakehecla	1998 QZ_{97}	Jake Jordan Hecla (born 1994) was awarded second place in the 2013 Intel International Science and Engineering Fair for his physics and astronomy team project.	JPL · 29607
29609 Claudiahuang	1998 RY_{54}	Claudia Huang (born 1996) was awarded second place in the 2013 Intel International Science and Engineering Fair for her chemistry project.	JPL · 29609
29610 Iyengar	1998 RO_{60}	Vinay Sridhar Iyengar (born 1996) was awarded best of category and first place in the 2013 Intel International Science and Engineering Fair for his mathematical sciences project.	JPL · 29610
29612 Cindyjiang	1998 RR_{77}	Cindy Y. Jiang (born 1995) was awarded second place in the 2013 Intel International Science and Engineering Fair for her environmental sciences project.	JPL · 29612
29613 Charlespicard	1998 SB_{2}	Charles Émile Picard, French mathematician and educator	JPL · 29613
29614 Sheller	1998 SR_{35}	William Sheller (born 1949) is a French composer, singer and pianist. He studied classical music but after listening to the Beatles decided he would play rock and roll. He has since found great success in France and has composed and interpreted progressive rock as well as symphonic rock	JPL · 29614
29618 Jinandrew	1998 SL_{124}	Andrew Cheng Jin (born 1997) was awarded second place in the 2013 Intel International Science and Engineering Fair for his medicine and health sciences project.	JPL · 29618
29619 Kapurubandage	1998 SO_{134}	Kapurubandage Dinesh Anuruddha Chithrananda Kapuge Pubudu (born 1994) was awarded first place in the 2013 Intel International Science and Engineering Fair for his electrical and mechanical engineering project.	JPL · 29619
29620 Gurbanikaur	1998 SM_{140}	Gurbani Kaur (born 1995) was awarded second place in the 2013 Intel International Science and Engineering Fair for her materials and bioengineering project.	JPL · 29620
29624 Sugiyama	1998 TA	Tomiei Sugiyama (born 1949), a Japanese-American baseball team supervisor	JPL · 29624
29628 Fedorets	1998 TX_{30}	Grigori Fedorets (born 1986) is a postdoctoral researcher at the Queen's University Belfast (Northern Ireland) whose contributions include asteroid orbit computation in the Gaia mission and simulations of minimoon discoverability with the Large Synoptic Survey Telescope.	IAU · 29628
29631 Ryankenny	1998 UV_{35}	Ryan M. Kenny (born 1996) was awarded best of category and first place in the 2013 Intel International Science and Engineering Fair for his plant sciences team project.	JPL · 29631
29632 Yaejikim	1998 UR_{44}	Yaeji Kim (b. 1992), a Korean aerospace engineer.	IAU · 29632
29633 Weatherwax	1998 VH_{2}	Craig (born 1947) and Leigh (born 1947) Weatherwax have helped the astronomy community in southern California for more than 40 years. They are good friends of the discoverer and this naming is on the occasion of their retirement.	JPL · 29633
29634 Sabrinaaksil	1998 VB_{3}	Sabrina Aksil (born 1985) is the wife of French amateur astronomer Luderic Maury (see #8184) and the daughter-in-law of Alain Maury, who is a discoverer of minor planets and comets (see #3780). She works as a human resources manager in a high tech company.	IAU · 29634
29638 Eeshakhare	1998 VX_{19}	Eesha Khare (born 1995) was awarded best of category and first place in the 2013 Intel International Science and Engineering Fair for her chemistry project. She also received the Intel Foundation Young Scientist Award.	JPL · 29638
29641 Kaikloepfer	1998 VA_{26}	Kai Thorin Kloepfer (born 1997) was awarded first place in the 2013 Intel International Science and Engineering Fair for his electrical and mechanical engineering project.	JPL · 29641
29642 Archiekong	1998 VY_{27}	Archie Chakming Kong (born 1996) was awarded second place in the 2013 Intel International Science and Engineering Fair for his environmental management team project.	JPL · 29642
29643 Plücker	1998 VR_{31}	Julius Plücker, German mathematician and physicist	JPL · 29643
29645 Kutsenok	1998 VX_{37}	Ekaterina Kutsenok (born 1997) was awarded second place in the 2013 Intel International Science and Engineering Fair for her chemistry team project.	JPL · 29645
29646 Polya	1998 WJ	George Pólya, Hungarian-born American mathematician †	MPC · 29646
29647 Poncelet	1998 WY	Jean-Victor Poncelet, French mathematician and engineer	JPL · 29647
29650 Toldy	1998 WR_{6}	Mikulás Toldy (1926–1996) and Viera Toldy (1926–1995), Slovak obstetrician and pediatrician, respectively	JPL · 29650
29654 Michaellaue	1998 WW_{9}	Michael Laue (born 1995) was awarded second place in the 2013 Intel International Science and Engineering Fair for his chemistry project.	JPL · 29654
29655 Yarimlee	1998 WH_{10}	Yarim Lee (born 1997) was awarded second place in the 2013 Intel International Science and Engineering Fair for her biochemistry project.	JPL · 29655
29656 Leejoseph	1998 WA_{12}	Joseph Patrick Lee (born 1997) was awarded second place in the 2013 Intel International Science and Engineering Fair for his physics and astronomy project.	JPL · 29656
29657 Andreali	1998 WD_{12}	Andrea Shao-yin Li (born 1996) was awarded first place in the 2013 Intel International Science and Engineering Fair for her biochemistry project.	JPL · 29657
29658 Henrylin	1998 WR_{17}	Henry Wanjune Lin (born 1995) was awarded best of category and first place in the 2013 Intel International Science and Engineering Fair for his physics and astronomy project.	JPL · 29658
29659 Zeyuliu	1998 WY_{17}	Zeyu Liu (born 1995) was awarded best of category and first place in the 2013 Intel International Science and Engineering Fair for his electrical and mechanical engineering project.	JPL · 29659
29660 Jessmacalpine	1998 WE_{20}	Jessie Leanne Preston MacAlpine (born 1995) was awarded best of category and first place in the 2013 Intel International Science and Engineering Fair for her medicine and health sciences project.	JPL · 29660
29663 Evanmackay	1998 WH_{23}	Evan Cliff MacKay (born 1996) was awarded second place in the 2013 Intel International Science and Engineering Fair for his animal sciences project.	JPL · 29663
29668 Ipf	1998 XO	The Ipf is a treeless mountain near the Ries impact crater in Baden-Württemberg, southern Germany.	JPL · 29668
29672 Salvo	1998 XG_{9}	Maria Elena Salvo, Italian astronomer †	MPC · 29672
29674 Raušal	1998 XO_{12}	Karel Raušal, Czech lawyer and amateur astronomer †	MPC · 29674
29675 Ippolitonievo	1998 XV_{15}	Ippolito Nievo (1831–1861) was an Italian writer, journalist and revolutionary. His Le Confessioni d'un italiano (Confessions of an Italian) is one of the most important novels about the unification of Italy.	IAU · 29675
29681 Saramanshad	1998 XT_{47}	Sara Manshad (born 1998) was awarded second place in the 2013 Intel International Science and Engineering Fair for her behavioral and social sciences project.	JPL · 29681
29685 Soibamansoor	1998 XG_{53}	Soiba K. Mansoor (born 1996) was awarded second place in the 2013 Intel International Science and Engineering Fair for her medicine and health sciences project.	JPL · 29685
29686 Raymondmaung	1998 XO_{53}	Raymond Aung Maung (born 1995) was awarded second place in the 2013 Intel International Science and Engineering Fair for his physics and astronomy team project.	JPL · 29686
29687 Mohdreza	1998 XL_{78}	Nurul MohdReza (born 1996) was awarded second place in the 2013 Intel International Science and Engineering Fair for her microbiology project.	JPL · 29687
29690 Nistala	1998 XL_{78}	Akhil Nistala (born 1995) was awarded second place in the 2013 Intel International Science and Engineering Fair for his mathematical sciences project.	JPL · 29690
29691 Ramónallerulloa	1998 XH_{96}	Ramón María Aller Ulloa, Spanish priest, professor, mathematician, and astronomer.	IAU · 29691
29692 Černis	1998 XE_{97}	Kazimieras Černis, Lithuanian astronomer.	IAU · 29692
29696 Distasio	1998 YN	Penny Distasio (born 1955) is an amateur astronomer and author. She ran the OPTAS astronomy club for 15 years and is now a content writer for many web sites related to astronomy.	JPL · 29696
29700 Salmon	1998 YU_{5}	George Salmon, Irish mathematician and theologian	JPL · 29700

== 29701–29800 ==
back to top

Named minor planet	Provisional	This minor planet was named for...	Ref · Catalog
29701 Peggyhaas	1998 YT_{6}	Peggy Haas (née Beryl Godfrey; 1912–1997) was an assistant to American astronomer William Henry Pickering in Jamaica. There she met and later married Walter Haas who in 1947, started the Association of Lunar and Planetary Observers (ALPO). She was indispensable to the ALPO in work on the Journal, as librarian from 1966 to 1985.	JPL · 29701
29705 Cialucy	1998 YP_{10}	Lucia Boattini (born 1958), elder sister of Andrea Boattini †	MPC · 29705
29706 Simonetta	1998 YS_{11}	Simonetta Boattini (born 1972), younger sister of Andrea Boattini †	MPC · 29706
29722 Chrisgraham	1999 AQ_{23}	Christopher Fox Graham (born 1979), American journalist and nationally-recognised slam poet about space themes.	MPC · 29722
29725 Mikewest	1999 AC_{25}	Michael West (born 1954) has served amateur astronomers for more than 30 years with his expertise, advice, encouragement and unwavering commitment to the astronomical community.	JPL · 29725
29728 Averbeck	1999 AM_{34}	George Averbeck (born 1954), American ceramic artist, glass blowing studio owner, and community leader in Flagstaff, Arizona.	MPC · 29728
29730 Bethwestfall	1999 BE_{2}	Elizabeth W. “Beth” Westfall, the Corporation Secretary and Board member of the Association of Lunar and Planetary Observers (ALPO) from 1990 through 2004.	IAU · 29730
29736 Fichtelberg	1999 BE_{7}	Fichtelberg, the highest mountain on the Saxon side of the Erzgebirge, Germany	JPL · 29736
29737 Norihiro	1999 BG_{7}	Norihiro Nakamura, Japanese baseball player	JPL · 29737
29738 Ivobudil	1999 BT_{8}	Ivo Budil (born 1933), a Czech science popularizer	MPC · 29738
29745 Mareknovak	1999 BM_{20}	Marek Novak (born 1994) was awarded second place in the 2013 Intel International Science and Engineering Fair for his electrical and mechanical engineering project.	JPL · 29745
29747 Acorlando	1999 BJ_{25}	Abigail Claire Orlando (born 1994) was awarded first place in the 2013 Intel International Science and Engineering Fair for her behavioral and social sciences project.	JPL · 29747
29750 Chleborad	1999 CA_{3}	Cary W. Chleborad (born 1970) is an American amateur astronomer, developer of precision telescope and observatory control software, and former president of the Sacramento Valley Astronomical Society.	JPL · 29750
29753 Silvo	1999 CY_{4}	Silvo Sposetti, son of Swiss discoverer Stefano Sposetti	MPC · 29753
29760 Milevsko	1999 CM_{10}	Milevsko, a small South Bohemian town founded in the 12th century at the crossroad of two trade routes.	JPL · 29760
29761 Lorenzo	1999 CJ_{16}	Lorenzo Bartolini (born 2011) is the elder son of the second discoverer and the grandson of the first discoverer, Sandro Bartolini and Maura Tombelli, respectively.	JPL · 29761
29762 Panasiewicz	1999 CK_{17}	Kinga Panasiewicz (born 1995) was awarded second place in the 2013 Intel International Science and Engineering Fair for her medicine and health sciences project.	JPL · 29762
29764 Panneerselvam	1999 CC_{23}	Sugirtha Panneerselvam (born 1996) was awarded second place in the 2013 Intel International Science and Engineering Fair for her environmental management project.	JPL · 29764
29765 Miparedes	1999 CG_{23}	Miguel Ignacio Paredes (born 1994) was awarded second place in the 2013 Intel International Science and Engineering Fair for his behavioral and social sciences project.	JPL · 29765
29770 Timmpiper	1999 CT_{28}	Timm Piper (born 1995) was awarded second place in the 2013 Intel International Science and Engineering Fair for his physics and astronomy project.	JPL · 29770
29772 Portocarrero	1999 CH_{31}	Isaac Christopher Portocarrero-Mora (born 1994) was awarded second place in the 2013 Intel International Science and Engineering Fair for his electrical and mechanical engineering project.	JPL · 29772
29773 Samuelpritt	1999 CH_{34}	Samuel Wye Pritt (born 1995) was awarded second place in the 2013 Intel International Science and Engineering Fair for his biochemistry project.	JPL · 29773
29776 Radzhabov	1999 CV_{45}	Maxim Ruslanovich Radzhabov (born 1997) was awarded second place in the 2013 Intel International Science and Engineering Fair for his chemistry team project. JPL	MPC · 29776
29783 Sanjanarane	1999 CU_{50}	Sanjana Jagdish Rane (born 1997) was awarded second place in the 2013 Intel International Science and Engineering Fair for her environmental sciences project.	JPL · 29783
29787 Timrenier	1999 CR_{57}	Timothy James Fossum Renier (born 1997) was awarded second place in the 2013 Intel International Science and Engineering Fair for his behavioral and social sciences project.	JPL · 29787
29788 Rachelrossi	1999 CG_{60}	Rachel Louise Rossi (born 1995) was awarded second place in the 2013 Intel International Science and Engineering Fair for her environmental management project.	JPL · 29788
29799 Trinirussell	1999 CZ_{81}	Trinity Russell (born 1995) was awarded second place in the 2013 Intel International Science and Engineering Fair for her animal sciences project.	JPL · 29799
29800 Valeriesarge	1999 CM_{84}	Valerie Youngmi Sarge (born 1997) was awarded second place in the 2013 Intel International Science and Engineering Fair for her energy and transportation project.	JPL · 29800

== 29801–29900 ==
back to top

Named minor planet	Provisional	This minor planet was named for...	Ref · Catalog
29802 Rikhavshah	1999 CD_{86}	Rikhav Shah (born 1997) was awarded second place in the 2013 Intel International Science and Engineering Fair for his environmental sciences project.	JPL · 29802
29803 Michaelshao	1999 CQ_{87}	Michael Shao (born 1997) was awarded best of category and first place in the 2013 Intel International Science and Engineering Fair for his animal sciences project.	JPL · 29803
29804 Idansharon	1999 CH_{90}	Idan Hadar Sharon (born 1995) was awarded second place in the 2013 Intel International Science and Engineering Fair for his electrical and mechanical engineering team project.	JPL · 29804
29805 Bradleysloop	1999 CK_{91}	Bradley Derek Sloop (born 1994) was awarded first place in the 2013 Intel International Science and Engineering Fair for his energy and transportation project.	JPL · 29805
29806 Eviesobczak	1999 CQ_{98}	Evie Sobczak (born 1996) was awarded best of category and first place in the 2013 Intel International Science and Engineering Fair for her energy and transportation project.	JPL · 29806
29808 Youssoliman	1999 CK_{100}	Yousuf Mounir Soliman (born 1996) was awarded second place in the 2013 Intel International Science and Engineering Fair for his computer science project.	JPL · 29808
29812 Aaronsolomon	1999 CS_{110}	Aaron Chu Solomon (born 1994) was awarded second place in the 2013 Intel International Science and Engineering Fair for his environmental management project.	JPL · 29812
29818 Aryosorayya	1999 CM_{117}	Aryo Sorayya (born 1994) was awarded first place in the 2013 Intel International Science and Engineering Fair for his medicine and health sciences project.	JPL · 29818
29824 Kalmančok	1999 DU_{3}	Dušan Kalmančok, Slovak astronomer	JPL · 29824
29825 Dunyazade	1999 DB_{4}	Dunyazade, the sister of the master story-teller of the 1001 Arabian Nights.	JPL · 29825
29827 Chrisbennett	1999 DQ_{7}	Christopher James Bennett (b. 1979), a British professor at the Department of Physics, University of Central Florida (Orlando, Florida)	IAU · 29827
29829 Engels	1999 EK_{3}	Friedrich Engels (1820–1895), a famous philosopher and the main thinker of dialectical materialism.	JPL · 29829
29832 Steinwehr	1999 EA_{12}	Dre Erik Howard Steinwehr (born 1995) was awarded first place in the 2013 Intel International Science and Engineering Fair for his plant sciences project.	JPL · 29832
29834 Mariacallas	1999 FE_{1}	Maria Callas (1923–1977; Sophia Cecelia Kalos) was a Greek soprano. She was, and remains, the iconic diva, the one to which the others are compared.	JPL · 29834
29837 Savage	1999 FP_{5}	Leonard Jimmie Savage (1917–1971), American statistician	JPL · 29837
29839 Russhoward	1999 FA_{9}	Russell A. Howard (born 1941) is an astrophysicist at the US Naval Research Laboratory. A pioneer in solar physics, he has led several space-based coronagraph experiments enabling ground-breaking studies of solar outflows and returning data that yielded the discovery of nearly 4 000 near-Sun comets.	IAU · 29839
29842 Marilynsoper	1999 FE_{18}	Marilyn Soper (born 1949), chair of various organisations and foundations supporting education and research in New Hampshire and elsewhere in the US.	JPL · 29842
29843 Brucesoper	1999 FJ_{19}	Bruce Soper (born 1946), retired chairman of the trustees of the Mount Washington Observatory.	JPL · 29843
29844 Millette	1999 FM_{19}	Christopher Millette, Sr. (born 1964), managing director of a capital management firm.	JPL · 29844
29845 Wykrota	1999 FE_{21}	Zininha and Henrique Wykrota, Brazilian amateur astronomers, founders of the Observatório Wykrota (a.k.a. Observatório Astronômico da Serra da Piedade) and of the CEAMIG (Centro de Estudos Astronomicos de Minas Gerais)	JPL · 29845
29850 Tanakagyou	1999 FQ_{25}	Gyou Tanaka (born 1997) was awarded best of category and first place in the 2013 Intel International Science and Engineering Fair for his earth science project.	JPL · 29850
29852 Niralithakor	1999 FD_{26}	Nirali Kunjan Thakor (born 1998) was awarded second place in the 2013 Intel International Science and Engineering Fair for her mathematical sciences team project.	JPL · 29852
29858 Tlomak	1999 FC_{31}	Dominique Helen Tlomak (born 1996) was awarded second place in the 2013 Intel International Science and Engineering Fair for her medicine and health sciences project.	JPL · 29858
29862 Savannahjoy	1999 FF_{37}	Savannah Joy Tobin (born 1994) was awarded best of category and first place in the 2013 Intel International Science and Engineering Fair for her biochemistry project.	JPL · 29862
29869 Chiarabarbara	1999 GC_{1}	Chiara and Barbara D'Abramo, sisters of the Italian co-discoverer Germano D'Abramo	JPL · 29869
29873 Bertachini	1999 GG_{9}	Antonio Bertachini Prado (b. 1962), a Brazilian research scientist.	IAU · 29873
29874 Rogerculver	1999 GV_{9}	Roger B. Culver (born 1940), a U.S. astronomer.	JPL · 29874
29880 Andytran	1999 GQ_{28}	Andy Tran (born 1995) was awarded first place in the 2013 Intel International Science and Engineering Fair for his medicine and health sciences project.	JPL · 29880
29881 Tschopp	1999 GO_{29}	Fabian David Tschopp (born 1992) was awarded second place in the 2013 Intel International Science and Engineering Fair for his computer science project.	JPL · 29881
29886 Randytung	1999 GQ_{31}	Randy Tung (born 1996) was awarded second place in the 2013 Intel International Science and Engineering Fair for his environmental management team project.	JPL · 29886
29895 Sarafaggi	1999 GP_{53}	Sara Faggi (b. 1983), an Italian astronomer.	IAU · 29895
29897 Kossen	1999 GM_{61}	H. Rose Kossen (born 1935, née Hoitenga) is a retired teacher, formerly of Watson Groen Christian School. She taught high school literature, challenging students to think deeply about the world around them.	IAU · 29897
29898 Richardnugent	1999 HG_{1}	Richard Nugent (b. 1955) has degrees in positional astronomy and worked for NASA in the 1980s on orbital navigation, instrument pointing and image analysis. An occultation observer since 1990, he travelled worldwide on 120 expeditions, including many eclipses in a concerted effort to measure the solar radius. He is the longtime Executive Secretary of IOTA.	IAU · 29898

== 29901–30000 ==
back to top

Named minor planet	Provisional	This minor planet was named for...	Ref · Catalog
29905 Kunitaka	1999 HQ_{11}	Kunitaka Sato (born 1948) has been a member of the Yamagata Astronomical Society since 1989.	JPL · 29905
29910 Segre	1999 JV_{8}	Corrado Segre, Italian professor of geometry	JPL · 29910
29950 Uppili	1999 JA_{86}	Harsha Sudarsan Uppili (born 1996) was awarded second place in the 2013 Intel International Science and Engineering Fair for his materials and bioengineering project.	JPL · 29950
29952 Varghese	1999 JL_{86}	Nathaniel G. Varghese (born 1997) was awarded second place in the 2013 Intel International Science and Engineering Fair for his materials and bioengineering project.	JPL · 29952
29959 Senevelling	1999 JJ_{92}	Seneca Jackson Velling (born 1996) was awarded second place in the 2013 Intel International Science and Engineering Fair for his physics and astronomy team project.	JPL · 29959
29969 Amyvitha	1999 JX_{109}	Amy Jaclyn Vitha (born 1996) was awarded best of category and first place in the 2013 Intel International Science and Engineering Fair for her plant sciences team project.	JPL · 29969
29972 Chriswan	1999 KO_{11}	Christopher Wan (born 1996) was awarded first place in the 2013 Intel International Science and Engineering Fair for his environmental sciences project.	JPL · 29972
29975 Racheledelstein	1999 LQ_{32}	Rachel Edelstein (b. 1964), the Annual Giving Officer for Lowell Observatory, USA.	IAU · 29975
29978 Arthurwang	1999 NN_{13}	Arthur Wang (born 1996) was awarded second place in the 2013 Intel International Science and Engineering Fair for his environmental management team project.	JPL · 29978
29979 Wastyk	1999 RN_{83}	Hannah Constance Wastyk (born 1995) was awarded best of category and first place in the 2013 Intel International Science and Engineering Fair for her cellular and molecular biology project.	JPL · 29979
29980 Dougsimons	1999 SV_{6}	Douglas Anthony Simons, American astronomer	JPL · 29980
29982 Sarahwu	1999 TT_{31}	Junyi (Sarah) Wu (born 1996) was awarded second place in the 2013 Intel International Science and Engineering Fair for her medicine and health sciences project.	JPL · 29982
29983 Amyxu	1999 VS_{61}	Amy Xu (born 1996) was awarded second place in the 2013 Intel International Science and Engineering Fair for her microbiology project.	JPL · 29983
29984 Zefferer	1999 VC_{79}	David Josef Zefferer (born 1992) was awarded second place in the 2013 Intel International Science and Engineering Fair for his energy and transportation team project.	JPL · 29984
29986 Shunsuke	1999 XW_{37}	Shunsuke Nakamura, Japanese football (soccer) player	JPL · 29986
29987 Lazhang	1999 XO_{49}	Lawrence Zhang (born 1996) was awarded second place in the 2013 Intel International Science and Engineering Fair for his cellular and molecular biology project.	JPL · 29987
29988 Davidezilli	1999 XR_{99}	Davide Zilli (born 1993) was awarded second place in the 2013 Intel International Science and Engineering Fair for his energy and transportation team project.	JPL · 29988
29991 Dazimmerman	2000 AC_{38}	David Masao Zimmerman (born 1994) was awarded best of category and first place in the 2013 Intel International Science and Engineering Fair for his microbiology project.	JPL · 29991
29992 Yasminezubi	2000 AY_{39}	Yasmine Sapphire Zubi (born 1996) was awarded second place in the 2013 Intel International Science and Engineering Fair for her cellular and molecular biology project. She attends the Satellite High School, Satellite Beach, Florida, U.S.A	JPL · 29992
29994 Zuoyu	2000 AC_{61}	Zuo Yu (born 1995) was awarded second place in the 2013 Intel International Science and Engineering Fair for her electrical and mechanical engineering team project.	JPL · 29994
29995 Arshavsky	2000 AO_{97}	Alec Vadim Arshavsky (born 1996) is a finalist in the 2014 Intel Science Talent Search, a science competition for high school seniors, for his bioengineering project.	JPL · 29995
30000 Camenzind	2000 AB_{138}	Kathy Camenzind (born 1996) is a finalist in the 2014 Intel Science Talent Search (STS), a science competition for high school seniors, for her physics project.	JPL · 30000

back to top

Preceded by 28,001–29,000	Meanings of minor-planet names List of minor planets: 29,001–30,000	Succeeded by 30,001–31,000
