= Magmic =

Canadian video game company

Magmic Inc.
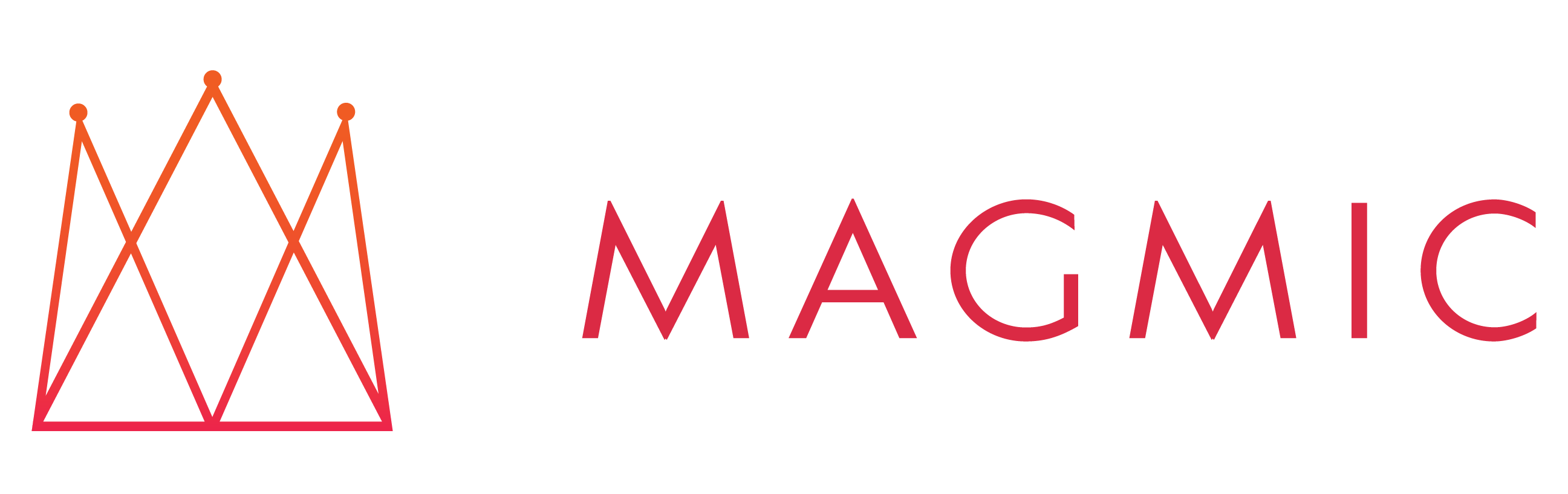
- Type: Private
- Industry: Video games
- Founded: 2002
- Headquarters: Ottawa, Ontario, Canada
- Key people: John Criswick, CEO
- Number of employees: 51-200 (2011)
- Website: www.magmic.com

Magmic Inc. is an Ottawa-based developer and publisher of mobile entertainment and lifestyle software. Founded in 2002, they produce original and licensed apps for a variety of mobile platforms, including Java ME, BREW, Sidekick, Windows Mobile, Apple iPhone, Android and BlackBerry.

== Distribution ==
Magmic has distribution deals with carriers worldwide, allowing subscribers to purchase and download Magmic games and other software directly through their handsets. In addition, Magmic has launched several direct-to-consumer portals including Bplay (for the BlackBerry market) and Winplay (for the Windows Mobile market) which allow for a variety of payment and download options. Magmic also sells games for iPhone and iPod Touch through Apple iTunes and has several offerings on App World, the BlackBerry application store launched by Research In Motion in 2009.

== Connected games ==
Magmic developed its own mobile-connected gaming platform where users can post scores, download daily puzzles, and play head-to-head. Early Magmic titles such as Blackjack Highroller (2002) allowed players to submit scores and see high score leaderboards in real time. This technology was expanded to include downloadable content, with games such as Sudoku (2004) and Ka-Glom! (2005).

True head-to-head mobile connected gaming was realized with the launch of Medieval Kings Chess II (2004) and Texas Hold'em King 2 (2004), which featured live players and AI "bots" playing Texas Hold'em for play money at a virtual table. THK2 proved very popular and was eventually included on several BlackBerry handsets. In 2008, Texas Hold'em King 3 improved gameplay and added more multiplayer features.
