= 30000 Camenzind =

Main-belt asteroid

Discovery
- Discovered by: LINEAR
- Discovery site: Lincoln Lab's ETS
- Discovery date: 4 January 2000

Designations
- Named after: Kathy Camenzind (ISTS awardee)
- Alternative designations: 2000 AB_{138} · 1991 RQ_{35} 1998 VR_{18}
- Minor planet category: main-belt · (inner) background

Orbital characteristics
- Epoch 27 April 2019 (JD 2458600.5)
- Uncertainty parameter 0
- Observation arc: 27.09 yr (9,895 d)
- Aphelion: 2.4487 AU
- Perihelion: 2.0860 AU
- Semi-major axis: 2.2673 AU
- Eccentricity: 0.0800
- Orbital period (sidereal): 3.41 yr (1,247 d)
- Mean anomaly: 162.97°
- Mean motion: 0° 17^{m} 19.32^{s} / day
- Inclination: 6.5761°
- Longitude of ascending node: 11.650°
- Argument of perihelion: 225.88°

Physical characteristics
- Mean diameter: 2.592±0.626 km
- Geometric albedo: 0.457±0.117
- Absolute magnitude (H): 14.6

30000 Camenzind (provisional designation 2000 AB_{138}) is a very bright background asteroid from the inner region of the asteroid belt, approximately 2.6 kilometers (1.6 miles) in diameter. It was discovered on 4 January 2000, by astronomers of the Lincoln Near-Earth Asteroid Research program conducted at the Lincoln Laboratory's Experimental Test Site near Socorro, New Mexico, in the United States. The asteroid was named for 2014-ISTS awardee Kathy Camenzind.

== Orbit and classification ==
Camenzind is a non-family asteroid from the main belt's background population. It orbits the Sun in the inner asteroid belt at a distance of 2.1–2.4 AU once every 3 years and 5 months (1,247 days; semi-major axis of 2.27 AU). Its orbit has an eccentricity of 0.08 and an inclination of 7° with respect to the ecliptic. The body's observation arc begins with its first observation as 1991 RQ_{35} at Palomar Observatory in September 1991.

== Naming ==
This minor planet was named after American student Kathy Camenzind (born 1996), a 2014-finalist of the Intel science talent search (STS). The official naming citation was published by the Minor Planet Center on 13 June 2014 (M.P.C. 88760).

== Physical characteristics ==
=== Rotation period ===
As of 2018, no rotational lightcurve of Camenzind has been obtained from photometric observations. The body's rotation period, pole and shape remain unknown.

=== Diameter and albedo ===
According to the survey carried out by the NEOWISE mission of NASA's Wide-field Infrared Survey Explorer, Camenzind measures 2.59 kilometers in diameter and its surface has a high albedo of 0.457. Such a high albedo is typical for E-type asteroids.

== See also ==
- 3000 Leonardo (minor planet number three thousand)
- 10000 Myriostos
- 20000 Varuna
- 30,000 (for the number thirty thousand)
