= Meanings of minor-planet names: 30001–31000 =

As minor planet discoveries are confirmed, they are given a permanent number by the IAU's Minor Planet Center (MPC), and the discoverers can then submit names for them, following the IAU's naming conventions. The list below concerns those minor planets in the specified number-range that have received names, and explains the meanings of those names.

Official naming citations of newly named small Solar System bodies are approved and published in a bulletin by IAU's Working Group for Small Bodies Nomenclature (WGSBN). Before May 2021, citations were published in MPC's Minor Planet Circulars for many decades. Recent citations can also be found on the JPL Small-Body Database (SBDB). Until his death in 2016, German astronomer Lutz D. Schmadel compiled these citations into the Dictionary of Minor Planet Names (DMP) and regularly updated the collection.

Based on Paul Herget's The Names of the Minor Planets, Schmadel also researched the unclear origin of numerous asteroids, most of which had been named prior to World War II. This article incorporates text from this source, which is in the public domain: SBDB New namings may only be added to this list below after official publication as the preannouncement of names is condemned. The WGSBN publishes a comprehensive guideline for the naming rules of non-cometary small Solar System bodies.

== 30001–30100 ==
| Named minor planet | Provisional | This minor planet was named for... | Ref · Catalog |
|---|---|---|---|
| 30004 Mikewilliams | 2000 BP_{33} | Mike Williams (born 1952) was a lead engineer at the University of Arizona's Lunar and Planetary Laboratory. | JPL · 30004 |
| 30005 Stevenchen | 2000 CJ_{23} | Steven Chen (born 1996), a finalist in the 2014 Intel Science Talent Search, a science competition for high school seniors, for his chemistry project. | JPL · 30005 |
| 30007 Johnclarke | 2000 CV_{45} | John Anthony Clarke (born 1996), a finalist in the 2014 Intel Science Talent Search, a science competition for high school seniors, for his earth and planetary science project. | JPL · 30007 |
| 30008 Aroncoraor | 2000 CE_{49} | Aron Coraor (born 1996), a finalist in the 2014 Intel Science Talent Search, a science competition for high school seniors, for his chemistry project. | JPL · 30008 |
| 30012 Sohamdaga | 2000 CB_{67} | Soham Daga (born 1996), a finalist in the 2014 Intel Science Talent Search, a science competition for high school seniors, for his behavioral and social sciences project. | JPL · 30012 |
| 30017 Shaundatta | 2000 CQ_{95} | Shaun Datta (born 1996), a finalist in the 2014 Intel Science Talent Search, a science competition for high school seniors, for his physics project. | JPL · 30017 |
| 30018 Loemele | 2000 CX_{101} | Loemele, the town of Lommel, Belgium. | IAU · 30018 |
| 30022 Kathibaker | 2000 DZ_{14} | Kathi Baker (1954–2014) was involved with administrative support for the NASA HiRISE mission to Mars, as well as supporting many faculty, staff and students at the University of Arizona's Lunar and Planetary Laboratory. Most recently, Kathi served as executive assistant to the LPL Director. | JPL · 30022 |
| 30024 Neildavey | 2000 DM_{21} | Neil Davey (born 1996) is a finalist in the 2014 Intel Science Talent Search, a science competition for high school seniors, for his bioengineering project. He attends the Montgomery Blair High School, Silver Spring, Maryland | JPL · 30024 |
| 30025 Benfreed | 2000 DJ_{26} | Benjamin Freed (born 1996), a finalist in the 2014 Intel Science Talent Search, a science competition for high school seniors, for his biochemistry project. | JPL · 30025 |
| 30027 Anubhavguha | 2000 DA_{42} | Anubhav Guha (born 1996), a finalist in the 2014 Intel Science Talent Search, a science competition for high school seniors, for his materials science project. | JPL · 30027 |
| 30028 Yushihomma | 2000 DL_{42} | Yushi Homma (born 1995), a finalist in the 2014 Intel Science Talent Search, a science competition for high school seniors, for his mathematics project. | JPL · 30028 |
| 30029 Preetikakani | 2000 DR_{58} | Preeti Kakani (born 1996), a finalist in the 2014 Intel Science Talent Search, a science competition for high school seniors, for her medicine and health project. | JPL · 30029 |
| 30030 Joycekang | 2000 DY_{61} | Joyce Blossom Kang (born 1996), a finalist in the 2014 Intel Science Talent Search, a science competition for high school seniors, for her engineering project. | JPL · 30030 |
| 30031 Angelakong | 2000 DZ_{63} | Angela Xiangyue Kong (born 1996), a finalist in the 2014 Intel Science Talent Search, a science competition for high school seniors, for her biochemistry project. | JPL · 30031 |
| 30032 Kuszmaul | 2000 DC_{65} | William Henry Kuszmaul (born 1996), a finalist in the 2014 Intel Science Talent Search, a science competition for high school seniors, for his mathematics project. | JPL · 30032 |
| 30033 Kevinlee | 2000 DP_{68} | Kevin Lee (born 1996), a finalist in the 2014 Intel Science Talent Search, a science competition for high school seniors, for his bioengineering project. | JPL · 30033 |
| 30035 Charlesliu | 2000 DX_{77} | Charles Xin Liu (born 1996), a finalist in the 2014 Intel Science Talent Search, a science competition for high school seniors, for his bioinformatics and genomics project. | JPL · 30035 |
| 30036 Eshamaiti | 2000 DF_{78} | Esha Maiti (born 1996), a finalist in the 2014 Intel Science Talent Search, a science competition for high school seniors, for her mathematics project. | JPL · 30036 |
| 30037 Rahulmehta | 2000 DU_{78} | Rahul Siddharth Mehta (born 1995), a finalist in the 2014 Intel Science Talent Search, a science competition for high school seniors, for his computer science project. | JPL · 30037 |
| 30039 Jameier | 2000 DE_{100} | Joshua Abraham Meier (born 1995), a finalist in the 2014 Intel Science Talent Search, a science competition for high school seniors, for his medicine and health project. | JPL · 30039 |
| 30040 Annemerrill | 2000 DO_{112} | Anne Merrill (born 1996), a finalist in the 2014 Intel Science Talent Search, a science competition for high school seniors, for her environmental science project. | JPL · 30040 |
| 30042 Schmude | 2000 EY_{3} | Richard Schmude (born 1958), a professor of astronomy at Gordon State College. | JPL · 30042 |
| 30043 Lisamichaels | 2000 EJ_{17} | Lisa P. Michaels (born 1995), a finalist in the 2014 Intel Science Talent Search, a science competition for high school seniors, for her medicine and health project. | JPL · 30043 |
| 30048 Sreyasmisra | 2000 EB_{37} | Sreyas Misra (born 1996), a finalist in the 2014 Intel Science Talent Search, a science competition for high school seniors, for his bioengineering project. | JPL · 30048 |
| 30049 Violamocz | 2000 EX_{38} | Viola Mocz (born 1996), a finalist in the 2014 Intel Science Talent Search, a science competition for high school seniors, for her physics project. | JPL · 30049 |
| 30050 Emilypang | 2000 EK_{39} | Emily Pang (born 1996), a finalist in the 2014 Intel Science Talent Search, a science competition for high school seniors, for her medicine and health project. | JPL · 30050 |
| 30051 Jihopark | 2000 ED_{41} | Jiho Park (born 1996), a finalist in the 2014 Intel Science Talent Search, a science competition for high school seniors, for his biochemistry project. | JPL · 30051 |
| 30053 Ivanpaskov | 2000 EG_{44} | Ivan Spassimirov Paskov (born 1996), a finalist in the 2014 Intel Science Talent Search, a science competition for high school seniors, for his bioinformatics and genomics project. | JPL · 30053 |
| 30054 Pereira | 2000 EO_{44} | Brianna Pereira (born 1996), a finalist in the 2014 Intel Science Talent Search, a science competition for high school seniors, for her medicine and health project. | JPL · 30054 |
| 30055 Ajaysaini | 2000 EL_{47} | Ajay Saini (born 1996), a finalist in the 2014 Intel Science Talent Search, a science competition for high school seniors, for his behavioral and social sciences project. | JPL · 30055 |
| 30057 Sarasakowitz | 2000 EK_{56} | Sara Sakowitz (born 1996), a finalist in the 2014 Intel Science Talent Search, a science competition for high school seniors, for her biochemistry project. | JPL · 30057 |
| 30060 Davidseong | 2000 EL_{60} | David Seong (born 1995), a finalist in the 2014 Intel Science Talent Search, a science competition for high school seniors, for his biochemistry project. | JPL · 30060 |
| 30061 Vishnushankar | 2000 EX_{61} | Vishnu Shankar (born 1996) is a finalist in the 2014 Intel Science Talent Search, a science competition for high school seniors, for his biochemistry project. | JPL · 30061 |
| 30063 Jessicashi | 2000 EX_{63} | Jessica Shi (born 1996), a finalist in the 2014 Intel Science Talent Search, a science competition for high school seniors, for her mathematics project. | JPL · 30063 |
| 30064 Kaitlynshin | 2000 ER_{64} | Kaitlyn Shin (born 1996), a finalist in the 2014 Intel Science Talent Search, a science competition for high school seniors, for her space science project. | JPL · 30064 |
| 30065 Asrinivasan | 2000 EF_{66} | Anand Srinivasan (born 1996), a finalist in the 2014 Intel Science Talent Search, a science competition for high school seniors, for his computer science project. | JPL · 30065 |
| 30066 Parthakker | 2000 EV_{68} | Parth Thakker (born 1996), a finalist in the 2014 Intel Science Talent Search, a science competition for high school seniors, for his materials science project. | JPL · 30066 |
| 30067 Natalieng | 2000 EL_{70} | Natalie Ng (born 1996), a finalist in the 2014 Intel STS, and was awarded first place in the 2013 Intel ISEF, for her medicine and health project. | JPL · 30067 |
| 30068 Frankmelillo | 2000 EZ_{70} | Frank Melillo (born 1958) has been the Coordinator for the Mercury Section of the Association of Lunar and Planetary Observers (ALPO) since 2001. Also in that year he received the ALPO Walter Haas Observing Award. | JPL · 30068 |
| 30070 Thabitpulak | 2000 ES_{84} | Thabit Pulak (born 1996), a finalist in the 2014 Intel STS, and was awarded second place in the 2013 Intel ISEF, for his environmental science project. | JPL · 30070 |
| 30073 Erichen | 2000 EP_{94} | Eric Shu Chen (born 1996), a finalist in the 2014 Intel STS, and was awarded first place in the 2013 Intel ISEF for his microbiology project. | JPL · 30073 |
| 30080 Walterworman | 2000 EQ_{105} | Walter E. Worman (born 1944 ) is a professor emeritus of the Minnesota State University (Moorhead, Minnesota) whose asteroid research in the 1990s and early 2000s helped establish asteroid photometry research using small university telescopes. | IAU · 30080 |
| 30081 Zarinrahman | 2000 EY_{108} | Zarin Ibnat Rahman (born 1996), a finalist in the 2014 Intel STS, and was awarded best of category and first place in the 2013 Intel ISEF, for her behavioral and social sciences project. | JPL · 30081 |
| 30085 Kevingarbe | 2000 EZ_{112} | Kevin Matthew Garbe (born 1995), a finalist in the 2013 Intel Science Talent Search, a science competition for high school seniors, for his mathematics project. | JPL · 30085 |
| 30087 Georgeputnam | 2000 EL_{122} | George Putnam, III (b. 1951) is a trustee of the Lowell Observatory Foundation. He is also a current director of the Gloucester Marine Genomics Institute and Harvard's Class ACT organization and a past trustee or director of several organizations including the Marine Biological Laboratory and the Massachusetts Audubon Society. | IAU · 30087 |
| 30088 Deprá | 2000 EK_{128} | Mário De Prá (born 1986) is a postdoctoral researcher at Florida Space Institute (Orlando, Florida) whose studies include photometry and spectroscopy of primitive asteroids to infer their composition, in particular those belonging to the outer belt dynamical groups. | IAU · 30088 |
| 30089 Terikelley | 2000 EW_{128} | Teri Twarkins Kelley (b. 1975) is a trustee of the Lowell Observatory Foundation. She is past Board Chair and Treasurer for the Arizona Cactus Pine Girl Scout Council and Board Member for McDowell Sonoran Conservancy. She works as a Certified Financial Planner at an international investment firm. | IAU · 30089 |
| 30090 Grossano | 2000 EL_{129} | Geoffrey Louis Rossano (1949–2021), an American historian, polymath, and author of several books and many articles, who was a teacher at Salisbury School in Salisbury, Connecticut. | IAU · 30090 |
| 30091 Stephenbrown | 2000 EY_{130} | Stephen W. Brown (b. 1943) is a trustee of the Lowell Observatory Foundation. He is the Emeritus Edward M. Carson Chair and Professor of Marketing at Arizona State University and Strategic Partner with The Insight Group. He has served in leadership roles with many non-profit boards, including being the President of the American Marketing Association. | IAU · 30091 |
| 30092 Menke | 2000 EB_{135} | John Menke (b. 1940) is a trustee of the Lowell Observatory Foundation. His past professions have included physicist at the Bureau of Standards in Gaithersburg, politician, and staff scientist at the Mitre Corporation. In 1991, he and his wife Meg began an astronomical-dome manufacturing business, which they ran until they retired in 2002. | IAU · 30092 |
| 30093 McClanahan | 2000 ES_{135} | Marjorie McClanahan (b. 1941) is a trustee of the Lowell Observatory Foundation. She has served on many non-profit boards such as those of the Arizona Community Foundation, Northern Arizona Healthcare, and the Museum of Northern Arizona. Her awards include Flagstaff Citizen of the Year. | IAU · 30093 |
| 30094 Rolfebode | 2000 ER_{141} | Rolfe Bode (born 1959) is an aerospace engineer who has worked on many NASA missions including MPL-MVACS and the Phoenix Mars mission at the University of Arizona's Lunar and Planetary Laboratory and private space companies including Paragon Space Development Corp. and World View Enterprises. | JPL · 30094 |
| 30095 Tarabode | 2000 EU_{145} | Tara Bode (born 1975) has been the long-time business manager at the University of Arizona's Lunar and Planetary Laboratory and the Department of Planetary Sciences. She has provided vital support for numerous planetary scientists, staff, students, programs and spacecraft missions. | JPL · 30095 |
| 30096 Glindadavidson | 2000 EZ_{147} | Glinda Davidson (born 1963) is a long-time business manager, contracts and budget expert at the University of Arizona's Lunar and Planetary Laboratory and the Department of Planetary Sciences. | JPL · 30096 |
| 30097 Traino | 2000 EQ_{148} | Alan Traino, American astronomer and caver | MPC · 30097 |
| 30100 Christophergo | 2000 EL_{157} | Christopher Go (born 1970), a Philippine astrophotographer. | JPL · 30100 |

== 30101–30200 ==
back to top

| Named minor planet | Provisional | This minor planet was named for... | Ref · Catalog |
|---|---|---|---|
| 30109 Jaywilson | 2000 FQ_{17} | Jay Wilson, a mentor of finalist in the 2014 Intel Science Talent Search (STS), a science competition for high school seniors | JPL · 30109 |
| 30110 Lisabreton | 2000 FH_{20} | Lisa Breton, a mentor of finalist in the 2014 Intel Science Talent Search (STS), a science competition for high school seniors | JPL · 30110 |
| 30111 Wendyslijk | 2000 FJ_{20} | Wendy Slijk, a mentor of finalist in the 2014 Intel Science Talent Search (STS), a science competition for high school seniors | JPL · 30111 |
| 30112 Weistrop | 2000 FZ_{25} | Donna Weistrop (b. 1944) is a trustee and chair of the Lowell Observatory Foundation. She is an Adjunct Faculty member at Northern Arizona University (NAU), a Research Associate at the Museum of Northern Arizona, and a member of the Advisory Council of NAU's Martin-Springer Institute. She even helped build an instrument for the Hubble Space Telescope. | IAU · 30112 |
| 30113 Kylerkuehn | 2000 FM_{26} | Kyler Kuehn (b. 1976), the Director of Technology at Lowell Observatory, USA. | IAU · 30113 |
| 30114 Mooney | 2000 FY_{26} | Madison Mooney (b. 1997), the Content Writer at Lowell Observatory, USA | IAU · 30114 |
| 30117 Childress | 2000 FW_{36} | Stephanie Childress, a mentor of finalist in the 2014 Intel Science Talent Search, a science competition for high school seniors | JPL · 30117 |
| 30119 Lucamatone | 2000 FS_{37} | Luca Matone, a mentor of finalist in the 2014 Intel Science Talent Search (STS), a science competition for high school seniors | JPL · 30119 |
| 30122 Elschweitzer | 2000 FC_{40} | Ellen Schweitzer, a mentor of finalist in the 2014 Intel Science Talent Search, a science competition for high school seniors | JPL · 30122 |
| 30123 Scottrippeon | 2000 FF_{40} | Scott Rippeon, a mentor of finalist in the 2014 Intel Science Talent Search, a science competition for high school seniors | JPL · 30123 |
| 30125 Mikekiser | 2000 FF_{41} | Mike Kiser, a mentor of finalist in the 2014 Intel Science Talent Search (STS), a science competition for high school seniors | JPL · 30125 |
| 30126 Haviland | 2000 FS_{41} | Maureen Haviland, a mentor of finalist in the 2014 Intel Science Talent Search, a science competition for high school seniors. | JPL · 30126 |
| 30128 Shannonbunch | 2000 FJ_{44} | Shannon Bunch, a mentor of finalist in the 2014 Intel Science Talent Search, a science competition for high school seniors | JPL · 30128 |
| 30129 Virmani | 2000 FT_{44} | Rajeev Virmani, a mentor of finalist in the 2014 Intel Science Talent Search, a science competition for high school seniors | JPL · 30129 |
| 30130 Jeandillman | 2000 FK_{46} | Jean Dillman, a mentor of finalist in the 2014 Intel Science Talent Search (STS), a science competition for high school seniors | JPL · 30130 |
| 30136 Bakerfranke | 2000 FO_{60} | Baker Franke, a mentor of finalist in the 2014 Intel Science Talent Search (STS), a science competition for high school seniors | JPL · 30136 |
| 30137 Sherryshaffer | 2000 FB_{63} | Sherry Shaffer (b. 1969) is the Senior Philanthropy Manager at Lowell Observatory, USA. | IAU · 30137 |
| 30138 Gonyea | 2000 FN_{68} | Jeff Gonyea (born 1973), American space educator and author of children's space-themed books and magazines. | IAU · 30138 |
| 30140 Robpergolizzi | 2000 GO_{5} | Robert Pergolizzi, a mentor of finalist in the 2014 Intel Science Talent Search, a science competition for high school seniors | JPL · 30140 |
| 30141 Nelvenzon | 2000 GT_{24} | Nel Venzon Jr., a mentor of finalist in the 2014 Intel Science Talent Search, a science competition for high school seniors | JPL · 30141 |
| 30142 Debfrazier | 2000 GS_{26} | Debbie Frazier, a mentor of finalist in the 2014 Intel Science Talent Search, a science competition for high school seniors | JPL · 30142 |
| 30144 Minubasu | 2000 GP_{31} | Minu Basu, a mentor of finalist in the 2014 Intel Science Talent Search (STS), a science competition for high school seniors | JPL · 30144 |
| 30146 Decandia | 2000 GQ_{34} | Maria DeCandia, a mentor of finalist in the 2014 Intel Science Talent Search, a science competition for high school seniors | JPL · 30146 |
| 30147 Amyhammer | 2000 GV_{41} | Amy Hammer, a mentor of finalist in the 2014 Intel Science Talent Search (STS), a science competition for high school seniors | JPL · 30147 |
| 30149 Kellyriedell | 2000 GW_{45} | Kelly Riedell, a mentor of finalist in the 2014 Intel Science Talent Search, a science competition for high school seniors | JPL · 30149 |
| 30150 Laseminara | 2000 GC_{46} | Laurie Seminara, a mentor of finalist in the 2014 Intel Science Talent Search, a science competition for high school seniors | JPL · 30150 |
| 30151 Susanoffner | 2000 GX_{46} | Susan Offner, a mentor of finalist in the 2014 Intel Science Talent Search (STS), a science competition for high school seniors | JPL · 30151 |
| 30152 Reneefallon | 2000 GW_{49} | Renee Fallon, a mentor of finalist in the 2014 Intel Science Talent Search (STS), a science competition for high school seniors | JPL · 30152 |
| 30153 Ostrander | 2000 GT_{50} | Peter Ostrander, a mentor of finalist in the 2014 Intel Science Talent Search, a science competition for high school seniors | JPL · 30153 |
| 30154 Christichil | 2000 GO_{52} | Christi Chilton, a mentor of finalist in the 2014 Intel Science Talent Search, a science competition for high school seniors | JPL · 30154 |
| 30155 Warmuth | 2000 GQ_{52} | Audrey Warmuth, a mentor of finalist in the 2013 Intel Science Talent Search, a science competition for high school seniors | JPL · 30155 |
| 30157 Robertspira | 2000 GL_{55} | Robert Spira, a mentor of finalist in the 2004 Intel Science Talent Search (STS), a science competition for high school seniors | JPL · 30157 |
| 30158 Mabdulla | 2000 GQ_{55} | Muhammad Ugur Oglu Abdulla (born 1999), a finalist in the 2014 Broadcom MASTERS, a math and science competition for middle school students, for his mathematics and computer science project | JPL · 30158 |
| 30159 Behari | 2000 GR_{55} | Nikhil Behari (born 2000), a finalist in the 2014 Broadcom MASTERS, a math and science competition for middle school students, for his mathematics and computer science project | JPL · 30159 |
| 30160 Danielbruce | 2000 GD_{57} | Daniel Sebastian Bruce (born 2000), a finalist in the 2014 Broadcom MASTERS, a math and science competition for middle school students, for his animal & plant sciences project | JPL · 30160 |
| 30161 Chrepta | 2000 GM_{57} | Benjamin Joseph Chrepta (born 1999), a finalist in the 2014 Broadcom MASTERS, a math and science competition for middle school students, for his mathematics and computer science project | JPL · 30161 |
| 30162 Courtney | 2000 GO_{57} | Joshua Michael Courtney (born 2001), a finalist in the 2014 Broadcom MASTERS, a math and science competition for middle school students, for his animal & plant sciences project | JPL · 30162 |
| 30164 Arnobdas | 2000 GC_{59} | Arnob Das (born 1999), a finalist in the 2014 Broadcom MASTERS, a math and science competition for middle school students, for his biochemistry, medicine, health science, and microbiology project | JPL · 30164 |
| 30166 Leodeng | 2000 GC_{62} | Leo Z. Deng (born 1999), a finalist in the 2014 Broadcom MASTERS, a math and science competition for middle school students, for his environmental sciences project | JPL · 30166 |
| 30167 Caredmonds | 2000 GR_{62} | Caroline S Edmonds (born 2001), a finalist in the 2014 Broadcom MASTERS, a math and science competition for middle school students, for her animal & plant sciences project | JPL · 30167 |
| 30168 Linusfreyer | 2000 GG_{66} | Linus Alexander Freyer (born 2001), a finalist in the 2014 Broadcom MASTERS, a math and science competition for middle school students, for his biochemistry, medicine, health science, and microbiology project | JPL · 30168 |
| 30169 Raghavganesh | 2000 GU_{67} | Raghav Ganesh (born 2002), a finalist in the 2014 Broadcom MASTERS, a math and science competition for middle school students, for his engineering project | JPL · 30169 |
| 30170 Makaylaruth | 2000 GG_{68} | Makayla Ruth Gates (born 2001), a finalist in the 2014 Broadcom MASTERS, a math and science competition for middle school students, for her physical sciences project | JPL · 30170 |
| 30172 Giedraitis | 2000 GZ_{71} | Alden Shea Giedraitis (born 1999), a finalist in the 2014 Broadcom MASTERS, a math and science competition for middle school students, for his engineering project | JPL · 30172 |
| 30173 Greenwood | 2000 GG_{72} | Floyd S. Greenwood (born 2001), a finalist in the 2014 Broadcom MASTERS, a math and science competition for middle school students, for his biochemistry, medicine, health science, and microbiology project | JPL · 30173 |
| 30174 Hollyjackson | 2000 GY_{72} | Holly Marie Jackson (born 2000), a finalist in the 2014 Broadcom MASTERS, a math and science competition for middle school students, for her physical sciences project. | JPL · 30174 |
| 30175 Adityajain | 2000 GS_{73} | Aditya Jain (born 2000), a finalist in the 2014 Broadcom MASTERS, a math and science competition for middle school students, for his biochemistry, medicine, health science, and microbiology project | JPL · 30175 |
| 30176 Gelseyjaymes | 2000 GX_{73} | Gelsey Elise Jaymes (born 2002), a finalist in the 2014 Broadcom MASTERS, a math and science competition for middle school students, for her environmental sciences project | JPL · 30176 |
| 30177 Khashayar | 2000 GV_{76} | Sahar A Khashayar (born 2000), a finalist in the 2014 Broadcom MASTERS, a math and science competition for middle school students, for her engineering project | JPL · 30177 |
| 30179 Movva | 2000 GY_{79} | Rajiv Movva (born 2000), a finalist in the 2014 Broadcom MASTERS, a math and science competition for middle school students, for his biochemistry, medicine, health science, and microbiology project | JPL · 30179 |
| 30183 Murali | 2000 GL_{95} | Chythanya Murali (born 2000), a finalist in the 2014 Broadcom MASTERS, a math and science competition for middle school students, for her environmental sciences project | JPL · 30183 |
| 30184 Okasinski | 2000 GM_{95} | Jonathan Guanghong Okasinski (born 2001), a finalist in the 2014 Broadcom MASTERS, a math and science competition for middle school students, for his physical sciences project | JPL · 30184 |
| 30186 Ostojic | 2000 GY_{95} | Annie Ostojic (born 2002), a finalist in the 2014 Broadcom MASTERS, a math and science competition for middle school students, for her mathematics and computer science project | JPL · 30186 |
| 30187 Jamesroney | 2000 GN_{96} | James Peter Roney (born 2000), a finalist in the 2014 Broadcom MASTERS, a math and science competition for middle school students, for his animal & plant sciences project | JPL · 30187 |
| 30188 Hafsasaeed | 2000 GR_{96} | Hafsa Naseem Saeed (born 2000), a finalist in the 2014 Broadcom MASTERS, a math and science competition for middle school students, for her environmental sciences project | JPL · 30188 |
| 30190 Alexshelby | 2000 GW_{96} | Alexander Lloyd Shelby (born 2000), a finalist in the 2014 Broadcom MASTERS, a math and science competition for middle school students, for his physical sciences project | JPL · 30190 |
| 30191 Sivakumar | 2000 GJ_{98} | Aditya Diwakar Sivakumar (born 2000), a finalist in the 2014 Broadcom MASTERS, a math and science competition for middle school students, for his physical sciences project | JPL · 30191 |
| 30192 Talarterzian | 2000 GB_{100} | Talar Victoria-Grace Terzian (born 2001), a finalist in the 2014 Broadcom MASTERS, a math and science competition for middle school students, for her engineering project | JPL · 30192 |
| 30193 Annikaurban | 2000 GL_{100} | Annika Frances Urban (born 2001), a finalist in the 2014 Broadcom MASTERS, a math and science competition for middle school students, for her engineering project | JPL · 30193 |
| 30194 Liamyoung | 2000 GM_{100} | Liam Hayden Young (born 2000), a finalist in the 2014 Broadcom MASTERS, a math and science competition for middle school students, for his environmental sciences project | JPL · 30194 |
| 30195 Akdemir | 2000 GB_{101} | Nilgun Akdemir, a mentor of finalist in the 2014 Broadcom MASTERS, a math and science competition for middle school students | JPL · 30195 |
| 30197 Nickbadyrka | 2000 GP_{102} | Nick Badyrka, a mentor of finalist in the 2014 Broadcom MASTERS, a math and science competition for middle school students | JPL · 30197 |
| 30199 Ericbrown | 2000 GX_{103} | Eric Brown, a mentor of finalist in the 2014 Broadcom MASTERS, a math and science competition for middle school students | JPL · 30199 |
| 30200 Terryburch | 2000 GG_{104} | Terry Burch, a mentor of finalist in the 2014 Broadcom MASTERS, a math and science competition for middle school students | JPL · 30200 |

== 30201–30300 ==
back to top

| Named minor planet | Provisional | This minor planet was named for... | Ref · Catalog |
|---|---|---|---|
| 30201 Caruana | 2000 GA_{105} | Chris Caruana, a mentor of finalist in the 2014 Broadcom MASTERS, a math and science competition for middle school students. | JPL · 30201 |
| 30203 Kimdavis | 2000 GK_{106} | Kim Davis, a mentor of finalist in the 2014 Broadcom MASTERS, a math and science competition for middle school students. | JPL · 30203 |
| 30204 Stevedoherty | 2000 GX_{107} | Steven Doherty, a mentor of finalist in the 2014 Broadcom MASTERS, a math and science competition for middle school students. | JPL · 30204 |
| 30205 Mistyevans | 2000 GV_{108} | Misty Evans, a mentor of finalist in the 2014 Broadcom MASTERS, a math and science competition for middle school students. | JPL · 30205 |
| 30206 Jasonfricker | 2000 GD_{109} | Jason Fricker, a mentor of finalist in the 2014 Broadcom MASTERS, a math and science competition for middle school students. | JPL · 30206 |
| 30208 Guigarcia | 2000 GN_{115} | Guillermo Garcia, a mentor of finalist in the 2014 Broadcom MASTERS, a math and science competition for middle school students. | JPL · 30208 |
| 30209 Garciaarriola | 2000 GG_{116} | Alfonso Garcia Arriola, a mentor of finalist in the 2014 Broadcom MASTERS, a math and science competition for middle school students. | JPL · 30209 |
| 30211 Sheilah | 2000 GN_{123} | Sheila Harrington, a mentor of finalist in the 2014 Broadcom MASTERS, a math and science competition for middle school students. | JPL · 30211 |
| 30216 Summerjohnson | 2000 GV_{125} | Summer Johnson, a mentor of finalist in the 2014 Broadcom MASTERS, a math and science competition for middle school students. | JPL · 30216 |
| 30218 Paulaladd | 2000 GC_{126} | Paula Ladd, a mentor of finalist in the 2014 Broadcom MASTERS, a math and science competition for middle school students. | JPL · 30218 |
| 30221 LeDonne | 2000 GX_{126} | Sarah LeDonne, a mentor of finalist in the 2014 Broadcom MASTERS, a math and science competition for middle school students. | JPL · 30221 |
| 30222 Malecki | 2000 GA_{134} | Eva Malecki, a mentor of finalist in the 2014 Broadcom MASTERS, a math and science competition for middle school students. | JPL · 30222 |
| 30225 Ellenzweibel | 2000 GV_{137} | Ellen Gould Zweibel (b. 1952), an American theoretical astrophysicist. | IAU · 30225 |
| 30226 Samuelleejackson | 2000 GY_{137} | Samuel Lee Jackson (b. 1997), a British researcher at The Open University, Milton Keynes, UK | IAU · 30226 |
| 30227 Jansensturgeon | 2000 GO_{139} | Trent Jansen-Sturgeon (b. 1991), an Australian planetary scientist. | IAU · 30227 |
| 30228 Hushoucun | 2000 GO_{141} | Shoucun Hu (born 1985) is a professor at the Chinese Academy of Sciences who studies gravity and dynamics around asteroids. He is currently involved in proposing new Chinese space missions to small solar system bodies. | IAU · 30228 |
| 30229 Neilbowles | 2000 GL_{142} | Neil Bowles (b. 1970), a British planetary scientist. | IAU · 30229 |
| 30230 Ralucarufu | 2000 GP_{142} | Raluca Rufu (born 1989) is a Postdoctoral Fellow at the Southwest Research Institute, whose graduate research at the Weizmann Institute explored lunar formation by modeling impacts and the accumulation of the ejecta. Her ongoing investigations include dynamical studies of satellites. | IAU · 30230 |
| 30231 Patorojo | 2000 GZ_{142} | Patricio Rojo (born 1977) is a professor at the Departamento de Astronomia, Universidad de Chile whose work includes the atmospheric characterization of exoplanets and minor body surveys, as well as characterization of binary asteroids. | IAU · 30231 |
| 30232 Stephaniejarmak | 2000 GV_{153} | Stephanie G. Jarmak (b. 1991), an American scientist at the Southwest Research Institute (San Antonio, TX) | IAU · 30232 |
| 30234 Dudziński | 2000 GD_{167} | Grzegorz Dudziński (born 1989) is a postdoctoral researcher at the Astronomical Observatory of the Adam Mickiewicz University in Poznań, Poland. He is studying physical properties of asteroids and contributing to development of new asteroid shape modeling methods. | IAU · 30234 |
| 30235 Kimmiller | 2000 GR_{179} | Kim Miller, a mentor of finalist in the 2014 Broadcom MASTERS, a math and science competition for middle school students. | JPL · 30235 |
| 30240 Morgensen | 2000 HF_{8} | Kristen Morgensen, a mentor of finalist in the 2014 Broadcom MASTERS, a math and science competition for middle school students. | JPL · 30240 |
| 30241 Donnamower | 2000 HN_{8} | Donna Mower, a mentor of finalist in the 2014 Broadcom MASTERS, a math and science competition for middle school students. | JPL · 30241 |
| 30242 Naymark | 2000 HQ_{8} | Alissa Naymark, a mentor of finalist in the 2014 Broadcom MASTERS, a math and science competition for middle school students. | JPL · 30242 |
| 30244 Linhpham | 2000 HP_{10} | Linh Pham, a mentor of finalist in the 2014 Broadcom MASTERS, a math and science competition for middle school students. | JPL · 30244 |
| 30245 Paigesmith | 2000 HC_{12} | Paige Smith, a mentor of finalist in the 2014 Broadcom MASTERS, a math and science competition for middle school students. | JPL · 30245 |
| 30248 Kimstinson | 2000 HV_{13} | Kim Stinson, a mentor of finalist in the 2014 Broadcom MASTERS, a math and science competition for middle school students. | JPL · 30248 |
| 30249 Zamora | 2000 HF_{14} | Suzanne Zamora, a mentor of finalist in the 2014 Broadcom MASTERS, a math and science competition for middle school students. | JPL · 30249 |
| 30251 Ashkin | 2000 HR_{22} | Emily Lorin Ashkin (born 1997), a finalist in the 2015 Intel STS, and was awarded second place in the 2014 Intel ISEF, for her medicine and health project. | JPL · 30251 |
| 30252 Textorisová | 2000 HE_{24} | Izabela Textorisová, Slovak botanist † ‡ | MPC · 30252 |
| 30253 Vítek | 2000 HF_{24} | Antonín Vítek, Czech biochemist, computer specialist, author, and media space popularizer | JPL · 30253 |
| 30254 Kamiński | 2000 HZ_{25} | Krzysztof Kamiński (b. 1980), a Polish researcher at the Astronomical Observatory Institute of the Adam Mickiewicz University. | IAU · 30254 |
| 30255 Bohner | 2000 HK_{26} | Richard Bohner (born 1950), retired aircraft construction manager and nurse, and is a longtime amateur astronomer. | IAU · 30255 |
| 30257 Leejanel | 2000 HH_{32} | Jihyeon (Janel) Lee (born 1997), a finalist in the 2015 Intel STS, and was awarded second place in the 2014 Intel ISEF, for her computer science project. | JPL · 30257 |
| 30259 Catherineli | 2000 HC_{35} | Catherine J. Li (born 1996), a finalist in the 2015 Intel STS, and was awarded second place in the 2014 Intel ISEF, for her materials science project. | JPL · 30259 |
| 30264 Galluccio | 2000 HT_{44} | Laurent Galluccio (b. 1983), a French software engineer at Observatoire de la Côte d'Azur, France. | IAU · 30264 |
| 30265 Rominagarcía | 2000 HH_{45} | Romina García (b. 1991), an Argentinian astronomer working at the Departamento de Geofísica y Astronomía, Universidad Nacional de San Juan, Argentina. | IAU · 30265 |
| 30267 Raghuvanshi | 2000 HQ_{49} | Anika Raghuvanshi (born 1997), a finalist in the 2015 Intel STS, and was awarded second place in the 2014 Intel ISEF, for her engineering project. | JPL · 30267 |
| 30268 Jessezhang | 2000 HM_{50} | Jesse Zhang (born 1997), a finalist in the 2015 Intel STS, and was awarded second place in the 2014 Intel ISEF, for his earth and planetary science project. JPL | MPC · 30268 |
| 30269 Anandapadmanaban | 2000 HS_{50} | Eswar Anandapadmanaban (born 1997), a finalist in the 2015 Intel Science Talent Search (STS), a science competition for high school seniors, for his bioengineering project. | JPL · 30269 |
| 30270 Chemparathy | 2000 HJ_{51} | Augustine George Chemparathy (born 1997), a finalist in the 2015 Intel Science Talent Search (STS), a science competition for high school seniors, for his plant science project. | JPL · 30270 |
| 30271 Brandoncui | 2000 HZ_{51} | Brandon Bichemg Cui (born 1997), a finalist in the 2015 Intel Science Talent Search (STS), a science competition for high school seniors, for his engineering project. | JPL · 30271 |
| 30272 D'Mello | 2000 HA_{52} | Ryan D'Mello (born 1997), a finalist in the 2015 Intel Science Talent Search (STS), a science competition for high school seniors, for his mathematics project. | JPL · 30272 |
| 30273 Samepstein | 2000 HV_{52} | Samuel Epstein (born 1996), a finalist in the 2015 Intel Science Talent Search (STS), a science competition for high school seniors, for his animal sciences project. | JPL · 30273 |
| 30275 Eskow | 2000 HP_{53} | Nicole Eskow (born 1996), a finalist in the 2015 Intel Science Talent Search (STS), a science competition for high school seniors, for her medicine and health project. | JPL · 30275 |
| 30276 Noahgolowich | 2000 HB_{55} | Noah Golowich (born 1997), a finalist in the 2015 Intel Science Talent Search (STS), a science competition for high school seniors, for his mathematics project. | JPL · 30276 |
| 30277 Charlesgulian | 2000 HF_{55} | Charles Gulian (born 1997) is a finalist in the 2015 Intel Science Talent Search (STS), a science competition for high school seniors, for his space science project. He attends the Ossining High School, Ossining, New York | JPL · 30277 |
| 30278 Gazeas | 2000 HN_{56} | Kosmas Gazeas (b. 1976), a Greek astrophysicist at the National and Kapodistrian University of Athens, Greece. | IAU · 30278 |
| 30279 Binnie | 2000 HQ_{56} | Joyce Binnie, Stewardship Assistant at Lowell Observatory. | IAU · 30279 |
| 30280 Raderlane | 2000 HS_{56} | Nicholas Rader Lane, the Dark Sky Ranger at Grand Canyon National Park. He plays a key role in the effort to preserve and promote dark skies in the park. | IAU · 30280 |
| 30281 Horstman | 2000 HH_{57} | Helen Horstman (born 1936), a long-time employee of Lowell Observatory, starting in 1964 and retiring in 2007. | JPL · 30281 |
| 30282 Jamessmith | 2000 HQ_{57} | James A. Smith (born 1938) is a science educator in north Georgia. With his wife Shirley, he has inspired and mentored generations of astronomers growing up in the rural counties of the region and established one of the first planetariums in the area. | IAU · 30282 |
| 30283 Shirleysmith | 2000 HS_{57} | Shirley R. Smith (born 1939) is a U.S. science educator in north Georgia. Together with her husband Jim and through her love of the night sky, she has encouraged and guided generations of young people into astronomy careers. | IAU · 30283 |
| 30285 Ellsworth-Bowers | 2000 HB_{59} | Timothy Ellsworth-Bowers, the Support Astronomer at Lowell Observatory, USA, for the Lowell Discovery Telescope. | IAU · 30285 |
| 30286 Klesman | 2000 HG_{61} | Alison Klesman (b. 1981), an American astronomer. | IAU · 30286 |
| 30288 Conelalexander | 2000 HT_{62} | Conel Michael O'Donel Alexander (b. 1960), a British research scientist at the Carnegie Institution for Science | IAU · 30288 |
| 30289 Richardcarlson | 2000 HP_{65} | Richard Walter Carlson (b. 1954), an American planetary scientist. | IAU · 30289 |
| 30290 Noble | 2000 HG_{69} | David Noble, the Commissioning Coordinator for the Astronomy Discovery Center (ADC) at Lowell Observatory, USA. | IAU · 30290 |
| 30295 Anvitagupta | 2000 HV_{74} | Anvita Gupta (born 1997), a finalist in the 2015 Intel Science Talent Search (STS), a science competition for high school seniors, for her biochemistry project. | JPL · 30295 |
| 30296 Bricehuang | 2000 HZ_{76} | Brice Huang (born 1997), a finalist in the 2015 Intel Science Talent Search (STS), a science competition for high school seniors, for his mathematics project. | JPL · 30296 |
| 30297 Cupák | 2000 HO_{77} | Martin Cupák (b. 1973), a Czech mission-specialist software engineer at Curtin University. | IAU · 30297 |
| 30298 Somyakhare | 2000 HJ_{81} | Somya Khare (born 1997), a finalist in the 2015 Intel Science Talent search (STS), a science competition for high school seniors, for her microbiology project. | JPL · 30298 |
| 30299 Shashkishore | 2000 HW_{81} | Shashwat Kishore (born 1996), a finalist in the 2015 Intel Science Talent search (STS), a science competition for high school seniors, for his mathematics project. | JPL · 30299 |
| 30300 Waagen | 2000 HF_{86} | Elizabeth O. Waagen, American astronomer. | IAU · 30300 |

== 30301–30400 ==
back to top

| Named minor planet | Provisional | This minor planet was named for... | Ref · Catalog |
|---|---|---|---|
| 30301 Kuditipudi | 2000 HK_{87} | Rohith Kuditipudi (born 1996), a finalist in the 2015 Intel Science Talent search (STS), a science competition for high school seniors, for his bioinformatics and genomics project. | JPL · 30301 |
| 30302 Kritilall | 2000 HS_{88} | Kriti Lall (born 1997), a finalist in the 2015 Intel Science Talent search (STS), a science competition for high school seniors, for his environmental science project. | JPL · 30302 |
| 30304 Denisvida | 2000 HZ_{103} | Denis Vida (born 1992) is a Croatian meteor astronomer working at Western University in London, Ontario. His research focuses on optical meteor measurements and he has developed a novel low-cost meteor camera system now deployed as hundreds of cameras within the Global Meteor Network. | IAU · 30304 |
| 30305 Severi | 2000 JA | Francesco Severi, 19th–20th-century Italian mathematician, historian, educator and philosopher | JPL · 30305 |
| 30306 Frigyesriesz | 2000 JD | Frigyes Riesz, 19th–20th-century Hungarian mathematician, elder brother of Marcel Riesz † ‡ | MPC · 30306 |
| 30307 Marcelriesz | 2000 JE | Marcel Riesz, 19th–20th-century Hungarian-born Swedish mathematician † ‡\ | MPC · 30307 |
| 30308 Ienli | 2000 JN_{1} | Ien Li (born 1997), a finalist in the 2015 Intel Science Talent search (STS), a science competition for high school seniors, for her behavioral and social sciences project. | JPL · 30308 |
| 30310 Alexanderlin | 2000 JO_{9} | Alexander Lin (born 1997), a finalist in the 2015 Intel Science Talent search (STS), a science competition for high school seniors, for his computer science project. | JPL · 30310 |
| 30312 Lilyliu | 2000 JC_{11} | Lily Liu (born 1997), a finalist in the 2015 Intel Science Talent search (STS), a science competition for high school seniors, for her chemistry project. | JPL · 30312 |
| 30314 Yelenam | 2000 JH_{14} | Yelena Mandelshtam (born 1997), a finalist in the 2015 Intel Science Talent search (STS), a science competition for high school seniors, for her mathematics project. | JPL · 30314 |
| 30316 Scottmassa | 2000 JT_{14} | Scott Massa (born 1997), a finalist in the 2015 Intel Science Talent search (STS), a science competition for high school seniors, for his biochemistry project. | JPL · 30316 |
| 30321 McCleary | 2000 JT_{17} | Jennifer McCleary (born 1997), a finalist in the 2015 Intel Science Talent search (STS), a science competition for high school seniors, for her chemistry project. | JPL · 30321 |
| 30323 Anyam | 2000 JV_{17} | Anya Michaelson (born 1997), a finalist in the 2015 Intel Science Talent search (STS), a science competition for high school seniors, for her physics project. | JPL · 30323 |
| 30324 Pandya | 2000 JS_{19} | Dhaivat Nitin Pandya (born 1997), a finalist in the 2015 Intel Science Talent search (STS), a science competition for high school seniors, for his computer science project. | JPL · 30324 |
| 30325 Reesabpathak | 2000 JV_{20} | Reesab Pathak (born 1998), a finalist in the 2015 Intel Science Talent search (STS), a science competition for high school seniors, for his medicine and health project. | JPL · 30325 |
| 30326 Maxpine | 2000 JS_{21} | Max pine (born 1997), a finalist in the 2015 Intel Science Talent search (STS), a science competition for high school seniors, for his animal sciences project. | JPL · 30326 |
| 30327 Prembabu | 2000 JP_{22} | Saranesh Prembabu (born 1997), a finalist in the 2015 Intel Science Talent search (STS), a science competition for high school seniors, for his materials science project. | JPL · 30327 |
| 30328 Emilyspencer | 2000 JX_{22} | Emily Jane Spencer (born 1996), a finalist in the 2015 Intel Science Talent search (STS), a science competition for high school seniors, for her materials science project. | JPL · 30328 |
| 30330 Tiffanysun | 2000 JY_{24} | Tiffany Sun (born 1997), a finalist in the 2015 Intel Science Talent search (STS), a science competition for high school seniors, for her behavioral and social sciences project. | JPL · 30330 |
| 30332 Tanaytandon | 2000 JW_{26} | Tanay Tandon (born 1997), a finalist in the 2015 Intel Science Talent search (STS), a science competition for high school seniors, for his computer science project. | JPL · 30332 |
| 30333 Stevenwang | 2000 JH_{27} | Steven Wang (born 1997), a finalist in the 2015 Intel Science Talent search (STS), a science competition for high school seniors, for his bioinformatics and genomics project. | JPL · 30333 |
| 30334 Michaelwiner | 2000 JN_{28} | Michael Winer (born 1996), a finalist in the 2015 Intel Science Talent search (STS), a science competition for high school seniors, for his physics project. | JPL · 30334 |
| 30336 Zhangyizhen | 2000 JD_{29} | Yizhen Zhang (born 1997), a finalist in the 2015 Intel Science Talent search (STS), a science competition for high school seniors, for her animal sciences project. | JPL · 30336 |
| 30337 Crystalzheng | 2000 JO_{29} | Crystal Zheng (born 1997), a finalist in the 2015 Intel Science Talent search (STS), a science competition for high school seniors, for her biochemistry project. | JPL · 30337 |
| 30347 Pattyhunt | 2000 JY_{37} | Patricia Hunt, a mentor of finalist in the 2015 Intel Science Talent Search (STS), a science competition for high school seniors. | JPL · 30347 |
| 30348 Marizzabailey | 2000 JD_{38} | Marizza Bailey, a mentor of finalist in the 2015 Intel Science Talent Search (STS), a science competition for high school seniors. | JPL · 30348 |
| 30350 Beltecas | 2000 JA_{39} | Steven Beltecas, a mentor of finalist in the 2015 Intel Science Talent Search (STS), a science competition for high school seniors. JPL | MPC · 30350 |
| 30353 Carothers | 2000 JQ_{39} | Patti Carothers, a mentor of finalist in the 2015 Intel Science Talent Search (STS), a science competition for high school seniors. | JPL · 30353 |
| 30357 Davisdon | 2000 JJ_{45} | Don Davis, a mentor of finalist in the 2015 Intel Science Talent Search (STS), a science competition for high school seniors. | JPL · 30357 |
| 30362 Jenniferdean | 2000 JD_{54} | Jennifer Dean, a mentor of finalist in the 2015 Intel Science Talent Search (STS), a science competition for high school seniors. | JPL · 30362 |
| 30363 Dellasantina | 2000 JW_{54} | Nicole Della Santina, a mentor of finalist in the 2015 Intel Science Talent Search (STS), a science competition for high school seniors. | JPL · 30363 |
| 30365 Gregduran | 2000 JO_{55} | Gregory Duran, a mentor of finalist in the 2015 Intel Science Talent Search (STS), a science competition for high school seniors. | JPL · 30365 |
| 30368 Ericferrante | 2000 JT_{57} | Eric Ferrante, a mentor of finalist in the 2015 Intel Science Talent Search (STS), a science competition for high school seniors. | JPL · 30368 |
| 30370 Jongoetz | 2000 JA_{59} | Charles Jon Goetz III, a mentor of finalist in the 2015 Intel Science Talent Search (STS), a science competition for high school seniors. | JPL · 30370 |
| 30371 Johngorman | 2000 JR_{59} | John Gorman, a mentor of finalist in the 2015 Intel Science Talent Search (STS), a science competition for high school seniors. | JPL · 30371 |
| 30372 Halback | 2000 JK_{62} | Damon Halback, a mentor of finalist in the 2015 Intel Science Talent Search (STS), a science competition for high school seniors. | JPL · 30372 |
| 30373 Mattharley | 2000 JO_{62} | Matthew Harley, a mentor of finalist in the 2015 Intel Science Talent Search (STS), a science competition for high school seniors. | JPL · 30373 |
| 30374 Bobbiehinson | 2000 JU_{62} | Bobbie Hinson, a mentor of finalist in the 2015 Intel Science Talent Search (STS), a science competition for high school seniors. | JPL · 30374 |
| 30375 Kathuang | 2000 JD_{63} | Katherine Huang, a mentor of finalist in the 2015 Intel Science Talent Search (STS), a science competition for high school seniors. | JPL · 30375 |
| 30379 Molaro | 2000 JY_{69} | Jamie L. Molaro (born 1986) is a planetary scientist at the Planetary Science Institute who specializes in thermal fracturing of rocks on asteroids and other bodies in the Solar System. | IAU · 30379 |
| 30384 Robertirelan | 2000 KK_{3} | Robert W. Irelan, a mentor of finalist in the 2015 Intel Science Talent Search (STS), a science competition for high school seniors. | JPL · 30384 |
| 30386 Philipjeffery | 2000 KL_{16} | Philip Jeffery, a mentor of finalist in the 2015 Intel Science Talent Search (STS), a science competition for high school seniors. | JPL · 30386 |
| 30388 Nicolejustice | 2000 KJ_{17} | Nicole A. Justice, a mentor of finalist in the 2015 Intel Science Talent Search (STS), a science competition for high school seniors. | JPL · 30388 |
| 30389 Ledoux | 2000 KW_{17} | Veronica Ledoux, a mentor of finalist in the 2015 Intel Science Talent Search (STS), a science competition for high school seniors. | JPL · 30389 |
| 30396 Annleonard | 2000 KV_{36} | Ann C. Leonard, a mentor of finalist in the 2015 Intel Science Talent Search (STS), a science competition for high school seniors. | JPL · 30396 |

== 30401–30500 ==
back to top

| Named minor planet | Provisional | This minor planet was named for... | Ref · Catalog |
|---|---|---|---|
| 30402 Esthergoddard | 2000 KN_{50} | Esther Goddard, secretary, photographer, and dedicated research partner for her husband, rocket pioneer Robert Goddard. | IAU · 30402 |
| 30405 Yunakwon | 2000 KE_{52} | Yuna Grace Kwon (b. 1990), a Korean postdoctoral researcher at the Technical University of Braunschweig (Germany). | IAU · 30405 |
| 30406 Middleman | 2000 KU_{54} | Elaine Middleman, a mentor of finalist in the 2015 Intel Science Talent Search (STS), a science competition for high school seniors. | JPL · 30406 |
| 30407 Pantano | 2000 KK_{55} | Alessandra Pantano, a mentor of finalist in the 2015 Intel Science Talent Search (STS), a science competition for high school seniors. | JPL · 30407 |
| 30409 Piccirillo | 2000 KY_{55} | Angelo Piccirillo, a mentor of finalist in the 2015 Intel Science Talent Search (STS), a science competition for high school seniors. | JPL · 30409 |
| 30411 Besse | 2000 KP_{57} | Sébastien Besse (b. 1980), a French planetary scientist at the European Space Agency (Madrid, Spain). | IAU · 30411 |
| 30412 Anthonylagain | 2000 KJ_{58} | Anthony Lagain (b. 1990), a French planetary scientist. | IAU · 30412 |
| 30413 Slatkin | 2000 KS_{59} | Charles Slatkin, American space enthusiast and the founder of The Wonder Mission, a nonprofit organization dedicated to inspiring future scientists, engineers, and “visioneers.”. | IAU · 30413 |
| 30414 Pistacchi | 2000 KC_{69} | Mike Pistacchi, a mentor of finalist in the 2015 Intel Science Talent Search (STS), a science competition for high school seniors. | JPL · 30414 |
| 30416 Schacht | 2000 KG_{76} | Scott Schacht, a mentor of finalist in the 2015 Intel Science Talent Search (STS), a science competition for high school seniors. | JPL · 30416 |
| 30417 Staudt | 2000 LF | Karl Georg Christian von Staudt, 19th-century German mathematician | JPL · 30417 |
| 30418 Jakobsteiner | 2000 LG | Jakob Steiner, 19th-century Swiss-German mathematician | JPL · 30418 |
| 30421 Jameschafer | 2000 LM_{2} | James R. Schafer, a mentor of finalist in the 2015 Intel Science Talent Search (STS), a science competition for high school seniors. | JPL · 30421 |
| 30425 Silverman | 2000 LP_{7} | Emily Silverman, a mentor of finalist in the 2015 Intel Science Talent Search (STS), a science competition for high school seniors. | JPL · 30425 |
| 30426 Philtalbot | 2000 LU_{8} | Phil Talbot, a mentor of finalist in the 2015 Intel Science Talent Search (STS), a science competition for high school seniors. | JPL · 30426 |
| 30430 Robertoegel | 2000 LO_{16} | Robert Toegel, a mentor of finalist in the 2015 Intel Science Talent Search (STS), a science competition for high school seniors. | JPL · 30430 |
| 30431 Michaeltran | 2000 LR_{16} | Michael Tran, a mentor of finalist in the 2015 Intel Science Talent Search (STS), a science competition for high school seniors. | JPL · 30431 |
| 30435 Slyusarev | 2000 LB_{29} | Ivan Slyusarev (b. 1987), a Ukrainian astronomer at the Institute of Astronomy, V. N. Karazin Kharkiv National University. | IAU · 30435 |
| 30436 Busemann | 2000 LC_{29} | Henner Busemann (b. 1967) is a German/-Swiss professor of Cosmochemistry at ETH Zürich, Switzerland | IAU · 30436 |
| 30437 Michtchenko | 2000 LE_{32} | Tatiana Michtchenko (born 1954) is a planetary scientist at the Instituto de Astronomia, Geofisica e Ciencias Ambientais of the University of São Paulo (Brazil) with important contributions on the dynamical evolution of the asteroid belt, in particular on the effect of non-linear secular resonances. | IAU · 30437 |
| 30438 Yongikbyun | 2000 LL_{34} | Yong-Ik Byun (b. 1964), a Korean professor at Yonsei University (Seoul, Korea) | IAU · 30438 |
| 30439 Moe | 2000 MB | Moe Howard (Harry Moses Horwitz), 20th-century American comedian, the mop-haired leader of the slapstick comedy team of the Three Stooges | JPL · 30439 |
| 30440 Larry | 2000 MG | Larry Fine (Louis Feinberg), 20th-century American comedian, long time member of the Three Stooges (the one in the middle with a scared-porcupine hairstyle) | JPL · 30440 |
| 30441 Curly | 2000 MX | Curly Howard (Jerome Horwitz), 20th-century American comedian, one of the Three Stooges | JPL · 30441 |
| 30443 Stieltjes | 2000 NR | Thomas Jan Stieltjes, 19th-century Dutch physicist and mathematician † ‡ | MPC · 30443 |
| 30444 Shemp | 2000 NY_{1} | Shemp Howard (Samuel Horwitz), 20th-century American comedian, one of the original vaudeville-era Three Stooges, appearing on film in 1946 to replace his ailing brother Curly | JPL · 30444 |
| 30445 Stirling | 2000 NJ_{2} | James Stirling, 18th-century Scottish mathematician | JPL · 30445 |
| 30448 Yoshiomoriyama | 2000 NV_{3} | Yoshio Moriyama, Japan planetaria constructor | JPL · 30448 |
| 30449 Caldas | 2000 NH_{13} | Manuel Caldas (b. 1981), a Uruguayan space engineer and astronomy researcher, working at the Departamento de Astronomía, Universidad de la República, Uruguay. | IAU · 30449 |
| 30452 Callegari | 2000 NR_{24} | Nelson Callegari (b. 1972), a Brazilian associate professor at the Universidade Estadual de São Paulo, Brazil. | IAU · 30452 |
| 30453 Cambioni | 2000 NQ_{25} | Saverio Cambioni (b. 1992), an Italian scientist working in the United States. | IAU · 30453 |
| 30454 Carrillosánchez | 2000 NK_{26} | Juan Diego Carrillo Sanchez (b. 1979) is a Spanish meteor scientist at Catholic University of America. | IAU · 30454 |
| 30455 Joelcastro | 2000 NB_{27} | Joel H. Castro Chacon (b. 1980) is a Mexican electro-optical engineer at the National Council of Science and Technology in Mexico. | IAU · 30455 |
| 30473 Ethanbutson | 2000 OP_{23} | Ethan Butson (born 1995), awarded second place in the 2014 Intel Science Talent search (STS), a science competition for high school seniors, for his medicine and health sciences project. | JPL · 30473 |
| 30483 Harringtonpinto | 2000 OG_{52} | Olga Harrington Pinto (b. 1992), an American physicist and planetary scientist working at the University of Central Florida. | IAU · 30483 |
| 30487 Dominikovacs | 2000 QG_{10} | Dominik Kovaks (born 1994), awarded second place in the 2014 Intel Science Talent search (STS), a science competition for high school seniors, for his materials and bioengineering team project. | JPL · 30487 |
| 30488 Steinlechner | 2000 QJ_{11} | Thomas Gunther Steinlechner (born 1993), awarded second place in the 2014 Intel Science Talent search (STS), a science competition for high school seniors, for his materials and bioengineering team project. | JPL · 30488 |

== 30501–30600 ==
back to top

| Named minor planet | Provisional | This minor planet was named for... | Ref · Catalog |
|---|---|---|---|
| 30509 Yukitrippel | 2000 YQ_{105} | Yuki Trippel (born 1994), awarded second place in the 2014 Intel Science Talent search (STS), a science competition for high school seniors, for his materials and bioengineering team project. | JPL · 30509 |
| 30514 Chiomento | 2001 HQ_{49} | Gabriel Chiomento da Motta (born 1995), awarded second place in the 2014 Intel Science Talent search (STS), a science competition for high school seniors, for his materials and bioengineering team project. | MPC · 30514 |
| 30521 Garyferland | 2001 MU_{14} | Gary Joseph Ferland, American astronomer. | IAU · 30521 |
| 30524 Mandushev | 2001 MY_{24} | Georgi Mandushev (born 1962), an assistant research scientist at Lowell Observatory who developed the data analysis pipeline that was instrumental in making the TrES exoplanet discoveries. | JPL · 30524 |
| 30525 Lenbright | 2001 MX_{28} | Len Bright (born 1957), an observer/technical assistant at Lowell Observatory. | JPL · 30525 |
| 30533 Saeidzoonemat | 2001 OV_{4} | Saeid Zoonemat Kermani (born 1962), a software engineer at Lowell Observatory. | JPL · 30533 |
| 30534 Holler | 2001 OA_{5} | Bryan Holler (b. 1990), an American astronomer at the Space Telescope Science Institute (Baltimore, MD). | IAU · 30534 |
| 30535 Sarahgreenstreet | 2001 OR_{5} | Sarah Greenstreet (born 1985) is a researcher at the B612 Asteroid Institute who studies orbital dynamics of asteroids and comets as well as planetary impact rates. | IAU · 30535 |
| 30536 Erondón | 2001 OJ_{7} | Eduardo Rondón (born 1980) is a planetary scientist presently working at the Observatorio Nacional in Rio de Janeiro (Brazil). He specializes in observational and theoretical studies of small Solar System bodies. | IAU · 30536 |
| 30537 Matteocrismani | 2001 OR_{8} | Matteo M. J. Crismani (b. 1990) is an American planetary scientist. | IAU · 30537 |
| 30539 Raissamuller | 2001 OT_{13} | Raissa Muller (born 1995), awarded second place in the 2014 Intel Science Talent search (STS), a science competition for high school seniors, for her materials and bioengineering team project. | JPL · 30539 |
| 30541 Delgadillo | 2001 OG_{20} | Angel Delgadillo, longtime business owner and founder of the Route 66 Association of Arizona. | IAU · 30541 |
| 30548 Markburchell | 2001 OT_{45} | Mark Burchell (b. 1960), a British Emeritus Professor of Space Science and former head of the Impact Laboratory at the University of Kent. | IAU · 30548 |
| 30553 Arcoverde | 2001 OV_{56} | Plicida da Silva Arcoverde (b. 1992), a Brazilian planetary scientist presently working at the Observatório Nacional in Rio de Janeiro (Brazil). | IAU · 30553 |
| 30558 Jamesoconnor | 2001 OC_{68} | James O'Connor, Irish amateur astronomer | JPL · 30558 |
| 30559 Cyrusavery | 2001 OG_{68} | Cyrus Avery, American oilman and highway commissioner who helped create U.S. Route 66 while serving on the federal board that developed the United States highway system. | IAU · 30559 |
| 30562 Güttler | 2001 ON_{72} | Carsten Güttler (born 1980) is the project manager for the OSIRIS cameras on the Rosetta mission at the Max Planck Institute for Solar System Research (Göttingen, Germany). His research includes the physical properties of dust in comets analyzed through laboratory experiments. | IAU · 30562 |
| 30564 Olomouc | 2001 OC_{77} | Olomouc, an old city in Moravia, the Czech Republic | JPL · 30564 |
| 30566 Stokes | 2001 OO_{81} | Sir George Stokes, 1st Baronet, 19th-century Irish mathematician and physicist | JPL · 30566 |
| 30569 Dybczyński | 2001 OG_{94} | Piotr Andrzej Dybczyński (b. 1957), a Polish professor at the Astronomical Observatory Institute of the Adam Mickiewicz University. | IAU · 30569 |
| 30575 Anacarolina | 2001 OM_{101} | Ana Carolina De Souza Feliciano (b. 1990) is a Brazilian research scientist at the University of Central Florida. | IAU · 30575 |
| 30576 Lago | 2001 OC_{103} | Don Lago, award-winning American author whose writings explore humanity's connection to the cosmos. | IAU · 30576 |
| 30577 Pinchuk | 2001 OU_{103} | Pavlo Pinchuk (b. 1995), an American physicist. | IAU · 30577 |
| 30578 Lawless | 2001 OD_{105} | Lucy Lawless, New Zealand-born actor, singer, and activist best known for Xena: Warrior Princess and roles in Battlestar Galactica and [Ash vs Evil Dead. | IAU · 30578 |
| 30585 Firenze | 2001 PE_{14} | Firenze (Florence) is an Italian city and the intellectual and artistic center known as the Cradle of the Renaissance. The city is a treasure chest of paintings, sculptures and terracotta-domed buildings, a tribute to artists such as Da Vinci, Botticelli and Michelangelo, from a glorious golden age that lasted three centuries. | IAU · 30585 |
| 30593 Dangovski | 2001 QZ_{16} | Rumen Rumenov Dangovski (born 1995) was awarded second place in the 2014 Intel International Science and Engineering Fair for his mathematical sciences project. | JPL · 30593 |
| 30596 Amdeans | 2001 QQ_{65} | Alexander Matthew Deans (born 1997) was awarded second place in the 2014 Intel International Science and Engineering Fair for his materials and bioengineering project. | JPL · 30596 |

== 30601–30700 ==
back to top

| Named minor planet | Provisional | This minor planet was named for... | Ref · Catalog |
|---|---|---|---|
| 30698 Hippokoon | 2299 T-3 | Hippokoon, mythological friend of king Rhesos of Thracia, awoken by Apollo as Odysseus and Diomedes were killing the Thracians (from the Iliad) | JPL · 30698 |

== 30701–30800 ==
back to top

| Named minor planet | Provisional | This minor planet was named for... | Ref · Catalog |
|---|---|---|---|
| 30704 Phegeus | 3250 T-3 | Phegeus, mythological oldest son of Dares (a priest of Hephaistos), fatally wounded by Diomedes during the Trojan War | JPL · 30704 |
| 30705 Idaios | 3365 T-3 | Idaios, mythological younger son of Dares (a priest of Hephaistos) and herald of king Priam, who tells him that Paris and Menelaos want to start a duel | JPL · 30705 |
| 30708 Echepolos | 4101 T-3 | Echepolos, first mythological hero of the great fight after the duel of Paris against Menelaos, killed by Antilochos | JPL · 30708 |
| 30717 Berkowski | 1937 UD | Johann Julius Friedrich Berkowski, Prussian daguerreotypist. | IAU · 30717 |
| 30718 Records | 1955 RB_{1} | Brenda Records, American departmental office manager for the Indiana University Astronomy Department, the discovery site. | JPL · 30718 |
| 30719 Isserstedt | 1963 RJ | Isserstedt is a part of Jena, situated high above the town and near the scene of the 1806 battle of Jena-Auerstedt. F. Börngen. | JPL · 30719 |
| 30720 Fernándezlajús | 1969 GB | Eduardo Fernández Lajús (born 1969), Argentine astronomer who worked on massive eclipsing binaries, exoplanets and Eta Carinae. | JPL · 30720 |
| 30722 Biblioran | 1978 RN_{5} | Bibliotheka (Rossijskoj) Akademii Nauk (RAN) (Библиотеку (Российской) Академии Наук, "Library of the Russian Academy of Sciences") † ‡ + | MPC · 30722 |
| 30724 Peterburgtrista | 1978 SX_{2} | St. Petersburg tricentenary (2003) † ‡ | MPC · 30724 |
| 30725 Klimov | 1978 SA_{8} | Andrej Andreevich Klimov (born 1922), is a choreographer and producer, People's artist of the USSR and Russia, State prize winner, patriarch of Russian dance, and the author of Principles of Russian Folk Dance | JPL · 30725 |
| 30767 Chriskraft | 1983 VQ_{1} | Christopher C. Kraft, who oversaw rocket launches and the design of space modules from Mercury to Apollo, as well as creating Mission Control | JPL · 30767 |
| 30769 Kaydash | 1984 ST_{2} | Ukrainian astronomer Vadym G. Kaydash. | IAU · 30769 |
| 30773 Schelde | 1986 RJ_{4} | The Schelde river, in Gouy, France. | JPL · 30773 |
| 30775 Lattu | 1987 QX | Kristan Rosemary Lattu, American member (of Finnish extraction) of the JPL technical staff, space systems integration and operations specialist | JPL · 30775 |
| 30778 Döblin | 1987 SX_{10} | Alfred Döblin, 19th–20th-century German doctor and novelist, best known for Berlin Alexanderplatz and Babylonische Wanderung | JPL · 30778 |
| 30779 Sankt-Stephan | 1987 UE_{1} | Abbey Sankt-Stephan (Benediktinerkloster Sankt Stephan) in Augsburg, Germany, where the Benedictine monk Father Gregor (Bernhard Helms) is a physics-astronomy teacher, builder of his own observatory and of the school planetarium | JPL · 30779 |
| 30785 Greeley | 1988 PX | Ronald Greeley, American planetary geologist | JPL · 30785 |
| 30786 Karkoschka | 1988 QC | Erich Karkoschka, German-born American astronomer | JPL · 30786 |
| 30788 Angekauffmann | 1988 RE_{3} | Angelica Kauffman, 18th-century Swiss painter | JPL · 30788 |
| 30797 Chimborazo | 1989 CV_{2} | Chimborazo is a volcano in the occident range of the Andes and the highest mountain in Ecuador (6263 m). In 1891, the botanist von Humboldt searched the slopes of the mountain for plants and trees in order to compare them with the vegetation in other continents | JPL · 30797 |
| 30798 Graubünden | 1989 CR_{5} | Graubünden (a.k.a. Grisons, Grigioni, Grishun), largest canton of Switzerland and birthplace of Angelica Kauffman | JPL · 30798 |

== 30801–30900 ==
back to top

| Named minor planet | Provisional | This minor planet was named for... | Ref · Catalog |
|---|---|---|---|
| 30805 Mikimasa | 1989 UO_{2} | Mikimasa Takeuchi (born 1967), Japanese amateur astronomer and astronomy curator at the Shimane Nature Museum. | JPL · 30805 |
| 30821 Chernetenko | 1990 RR_{17} | Yuliya Andreevna Chernetenko, Russian astronomer | JPL · 30821 |
| 30826 Coulomb | 1990 TS_{1} | Charles-Augustin de Coulomb, 18th-century French physicist, author of Sur l'électricité et le magnétisme | JPL · 30826 |
| 30827 Lautenschläger | 1990 TE_{2} | Manfred Lautenschläger, lawyer, entrepreneur and philanthropist JPL | MPC · 30827 |
| 30828 Bethe | 1990 TK_{4} | Hans Albrecht Bethe, 20th-century German-American physicist and Nobelist | JPL · 30828 |
| 30829 Wolfwacker | 1990 TE_{9} | Wolfgang Wacker, German astronomer who worked at the Heidelberg Max-Planck-Institut | JPL · 30829 |
| 30830 Jahn | 1990 TQ_{12} | Friedrich Ludwig Jahn, 18th–19th-century German educator, writer and "father of gymnastics" | JPL · 30830 |
| 30831 Seignovert | 1990 TO_{14} | Benoît Seignovert (born 1990) earned his PhD from the University of Reims, France. His research focuses on Titan's surface and atmosphere. He developed and maintains the Cassini/VIMS data portal that hosts the complete dataset of spectral cubes of Saturn's icy moons observed during the Cassini mission. | IAU · 30831 |
| 30832 Urbaincreve | 1990 UC_{5} | Urbain Creve (1950–2011), a doctor of medicine at the Stuivenberg clinic in Antwerp and a good friend of the discoverer Eric Walter Elst | JPL · 30832 |
| 30835 Waterloo | 1990 WB_{7} | Waterloo, Belgium, site of the Battle of Waterloo. | MPC · 30835 |
| 30836 Schnittke | 1991 AU_{2} | Alfred Garriyevich Schnittke, 20th-century Russian composer, creator of "polystylism" | JPL · 30836 |
| 30837 Steinheil | 1991 AW_{2} | Carl August von Steinheil, 19th-century Swiss-German physicist and opticist | JPL · 30837 |
| 30838 Hitomiyamasaki | 1991 CM_{1} | Hitomi Yamasaki (born 1945), who sufferers from leprosy became interested in astronomy and exchanged letters with Japanese astronomer Tsutomu Seki, who co-discovered this minor planet as well as Comet Ikeya–Seki | IAU · 30838 |
| 30840 Jackalice | 1991 GC_{2} | Jack Newton (1942–2025), Canadian astrophotographer, and his wife Alice | JPL · 30840 |
| 30844 Hukeller | 1991 KE | Hans-Ulrich Keller (born 1943), a German professor of astronomy at the University of Stuttgart, director of the Carl-Zeiss-Planetarium Stuttgart and the Weizheim Observatory, as well as editor of the "Himmelsjahr", an astronomical almanac. | MPC · 30844 |
| 30847 Lampert | 1991 RC_{5} | Klaus Lampert, experienced amateur radio operator | JPL · 30847 |
| 30850 Vonsiemens | 1991 TN_{2} | Ernst Werner von Siemens, 19th-century German inventor and industrialist, inventor of the dynamo and founder of electrotechnology | JPL · 30850 |
| 30851 Reißfelder | 1991 TD_{6} | Günter Reißfelder, German physician and well-known expert on urology and ambulant surgery | JPL · 30851 |
| 30852 Debye | 1991 TR_{6} | Peter Joseph William Debye, 20th-century Dutch-born American physical chemist † ‡ | MPC · 30852 |
| 30857 Parsec | 1991 YY | The first five digits of the parsec (in metres) | JPL · 30857 |
| 30879 Hiroshikanai | 1992 KF | Hiroshi Kanai, Japanese photographer, president of the Minox Club of Japan (1969–2005) | JPL · 30879 |
| 30881 Robertstevenson | 1992 RS_{4} | Robert Louis Stevenson (1850–1894) was a Scottish novelist, poet, essayist and travel writer. His 1879 publication Travels with a Donkey in the C ́evennes, recounted his 200 km trip on foot through the C ́evennes mountains. The road he followed has been named Chemin de Stevenson in his honor. | JPL · 30881 |
| 30882 Tomhenning | 1992 SG_{2} | Thomas Henning, managing director of the Heidelberg Max-Planck-Institute for Astronomy | JPL · 30882 |
| 30883 de Broglie | 1992 SW_{16} | Louis-Victor, 7th duc de Broglie, 20th-century French physicist and Nobelist | JPL · 30883 |
| 30886 Hayashitadashi | 1992 WJ_{1} | Tadashi Hayashi (born 1971), Japanese astronomer and Chief Curator of Astronomy at the Toyama Science Museum. | JPL · 30886 |
| 30888 Okitsumisaki | 1993 BG_{2} | Okitsumisaki in western Kōchi Prefecture, a small promontory jutting into the Pacific Ocean. | JPL · 30888 |

== 30901–31000 ==
back to top

| Named minor planet | Provisional | This minor planet was named for... | Ref · Catalog |
|---|---|---|---|
| 30917 Moehorgan | 1993 HV_{1} | Maureen "Moe" A. Horgan, American trombonist, conductor and teacher | JPL · 30917 |
| 30924 Imamura | 1993 RC_{2} | Kazuyoshi Imamura (born 1985), Japanese astronomer Curator of Astronomy at the Anan Science Center. | JPL · 30924 |
| 30925 Todahiroyuki | 1993 RD_{2} | Hiroyuki Toda (born 1966), PR staff member at the Okayama Observatory of Kyoto University. | JPL · 30925 |
| 30928 Jefferson | 1993 TJ_{32} | Thomas Jefferson, the third president of the United States (1801–1809) | JPL · 30928 |
| 30933 Grillparzer | 1993 UW_{8} | Franz Grillparzer, 19th-century Austrian dramatic poet and playwright | JPL · 30933 |
| 30934 Bakerhansen | 1993 WH | The two American space enthusiasts Lonny Baker (born 1942), Global volunteer leader of the Planetary Society, and Todd Hansen (born 1950), author of Deep Sky and other Enthusiasms | JPL · 30934 |
| 30935 Davasobel | 1994 AK_{1} | Dava Sobel, American author | JPL · 30935 |
| 30936 Basra | 1994 BR_{3} | The city of Basra, located in south-eastern Iraq. It was founded in 636 CE at the historical location of Sumer, the first urban civilization in Mesopotamia. | JPL · 30936 |
| 30937 Bashkirtseff | 1994 BA_{4} | Marie Bashkirtseff (1858–1884), known for her impressionistic paintings Automne (1883) and La Réunion (1884), and especially for her diary, with a personal account of the struggle of women artists in a bourgeois society. | JPL · 30937 |
| 30938 Montmartre | 1994 BB_{4} | Montmartre, a large hill in Paris (France) | JPL · 30938 |
| 30939 Samaritaine | 1994 BE_{4} | La Samaritaine, a department store near the Pont Neuf, Paris. | JPL · 30939 |
| 30942 Helicaon | 1994 CX_{13} | Helicaon, a Trojan warrior, was the son of Antenor and the husband of Laodice, daughter of Priamos, king of Troy | JPL · 30942 |
| 30944 Hiruma | 1994 GD_{1} | Kazuhiko Hiruma, chairman of Sanko Gakuen, an educational corporation that operates over 40 vocational schools, one university and one junior college. He is one of the most well-known educational scholars in the Tokyo education world. | IAU · 30944 |
| 30943 Takeisakiyo | 1994 ED_{2} | Sakiyo Takei (born 1981), Japanese amateur astronomer. | JPL · 30943 |
| 30955 Weiser | 1994 PG_{29} | Thorolf Weiser, German palaeontologic geologist | JPL · 30955 |
| 30963 Mount Banzan | 1994 WO_{3} | Mount Banzan, Japan, at the foot of which is the Sendai Astronomical Observatory Ayashi Station (and where the New Sendai Astronomical Observatory will be in 2008) | JPL · 30963 |
| 30991 Minenze | 1995 SV_{53} | Min Enze, academician of the Chinese Academy of Sciences and the Chinese Academy of Engineering | JPL · 30991 |
| 31000 Rockchic | 1995 VV | Nickname of Gail Swanson, American singer-songwriter | JPL · 31000 |

back to top

| Preceded by 29,001–30,000 | Meanings of minor-planet names List of minor planets: 30,001–31,000 | Succeeded by 31,001–32,000 |
