= Texas Hold'em King =

Texas Hold'em King Franchise
- Texas Hold'em King LIVE logo
- Developer: Magmic Games
- Publisher: Magmic Games
- Producers: Marco Cultrera (THK2); Phil Giroux (THK2, THK3); Kevin Leduc (THK3); Nick Tremmaglia (THKLive)
- Designer: Marco Cultrera (THK3)
- Artists: Tony Monorchio (THK2); Erin English (THK2, THK3); Nathaniel Dart (THK3); Kenji Toyooka (THK3); Rod Zylstra (THKLive); Anthony Trager (THKLive)
- Platforms: BlackBerry OS, Android, J2ME, iOS
- Release: THK - 2004; THK2 - 2005; THK3 - 2008; THKLive - 2010; THK - 2013
- Genres: Card Games, Texas Hold'em Poker
- Modes: Multiplayer, Single player

The Texas Hold’em King franchise is a series of games for mobile devices based on the popular version of poker, Texas Hold 'em. Developed by Ottawa-based Magmic Games, the titles have been ported to a number of devices all leading to the latest version with varied features taking one version a step up from the last.

Released in June 2004, Texas Hold’em King was the first instalment in the THK franchise. It was ported to multiple devices, including BlackBerry and J2ME devices and offered players a poker experience unlike most others available. Primarily a single player game it served as the foundation for the next version, Texas Hold’em King 2.

== Texas Hold'em King 2 ==
THK2 was Magmic's first foray into multiplayer poker, offering tournaments and head to head play right from the user's device. Using servers hosted by Magmic, players were able to play games of Poker with up to 5 other people live, at the same time. Like the previous version it was available on a variety of devices and is still being played due to it being pre-loaded on a variety of BlackBerry handsets.

Magmic also hosted a tournament in late March 2007 which the winner received an all-expenses paid trip to Orlando in May of the same year.

=== Features ===
- Ring game, Tournament and World Series modes
- Standalone and Multiplayer modes
- Online Buddy Lists and Friend Finder
- 4 Color Deck for suit visibility
- Customize with dozens of avatars and 7 different designed decks
- In game chat and chat macros
- Tournaments for real prizes.

=== Reception ===
The BlackBerry blog BlackBerry Cool wrote a review of THK2 in August 2005 saying “Like we’ve said before, the graphics in this game are sweet. Everything is crisp and well defined, with vibrant colours. The overall graphical feel to the game also perfectly suits the Las Vegas poker aesthetic.”

== Texas Hold'em King 3 ==
Texas Hold'em King 3 for Android.

Building on the success of THK2, Magmic released Texas Hold’em King 3 in April 2008. With improved graphics and multiplayer features, the game also offered a unique “turbo mode” for Single Player gameplay. At the peak of its success, THK3 had a community of over 100,000 players and added to the total franchise downloads of over 5 million. It was ported for Android in late 2010.

=== Reception ===
The blog BerryReview gave the game a 9/10 stars saying “Overall, THK3 is a lot of fun, have excellent graphics, and easy game play.”

T3 AppChart gave it 3/5 stars and mentioned some of the AI issues the game had “The AI is still a little easy to bully around as well – invariably big raises will win pots, although less frequently than in previous iterations of the game.”

== THK LIVE! ==
Two and a half years later, an exclusively online version of THK was released in its BETA stage. This version got rid of the single player element of the game in favour of a more social experience. Free to download and play, the game offered a whole slew of new features to the online community. Its UI is strikingly similar to the BlackBerry homescreen, having your options along the bottom of the screen; leaving the rest of the screen open for gameplay. In October 2011 it was released for Android. This allowed players on both platforms to play against each other at the same table.

=== Features ===
- Free To Play
- Free Content Updates
- Automatic Table Selection
- 35 Achievements
- 30 Unique Stylish Avatars
- Daily Chip Lottery
- Improved BBM style chat system.

=== Reception ===
In June 2011 PCMag voted THK Live! as one of “The 10 Best Free BlackBerry Games”

== THK ==
With the release of BB10, Magmic followed suit by releasing a brand new version of Texas Hold'em King. This next generation of Texas Hold’em King was also recently launched on the iOS platform and features table invites; allowing players to invite their friends to their table and take on the poker world together (regardless of whether you're using a BlackBerry 10 or iOS device). The game is also coming soon to Android.

=== Features ===
- Play against up to 5 players
- Get free chips every day
- Create you own table and invite buddies with BBM, Email, or NFC
- Choose your poker face from dozens of avatars
- Create a private table and invite your buddies
- Live chat
