= Ka-Glom! =

2006 video game

- Developer: Magmic
- Publisher: Magmic
- Platforms: BlackBerry, Java, Windows Mobile, iOS, Android
- Release: NA: 2006
- Genre: Puzzle

Ka-Glom! is a puzzle video game created and published by mobile developer Magmic. Originally developed for BlackBerry in 2006, it has since been ported to Java, Windows Mobile, and iOS devices. It is similar to Puyo Puyo which was originally released in 1991 by Compile for the MSX2.

== Gameplay ==
iOS screenshot

The objective of Ka-Glom! in Survival mode is to create explosions and chains of explosions using pieces that drop from top to bottom thereby accumulating the highest score possible before the stack of pieces reaches the top of the screen. Of the two block types, only the Ka-Glom jelly is explosive. The players must connect four Ka-Gloms of the same color to start an explosive reaction eliminating all connecting blocks of that color. In building huge chain-reacting explosions the Ka-Glom Factor increases and the bonus points multiply.

The regular pieces drop in from the top in pairs, with two Ka-Gloms or at minimum a Ka-Glom and a Block. Players can rotate pieces as they drop, and try and combine the colors with other Ka-Gloms on the bottom. Gravity pulls the pieces toward the bottom, and increases slowly as play proceeds. When four Ka-Gloms of the same color are combined, they explode creating a reaction that explodes all blocks of that same color also. After the explosion, gravity pulls down the rest of the pieces, and could cause even more exploding Ka-Gloms. The Special pieces drop in one at a time. If a block is placed that extends above the screen, the game ends.

=== Bonus points ===
The Ka-Glom Factor is a timed bonus meter. It consists of a Bar and a Multiplier. The Bar increases whenever blocks are destroyed. If there are explosion combinations, the Bar will increase faster. If the Bar fills up to the max, the multiplier increases to the next level. The Multiplier doubles or triples player scores as ever more blocks are destroyed. This is termed the Ka-Glom Factor. The better one plays, the better the Ka-Glom Factor, but one must hurry as the Bar constantly decays over time. Players soon discover that chaining multiple explosions keeps the Ka-Glom Factor high and dramatically improves scores.

=== Time Attack ===
In Time Attack, play is against a 3, 5 or 8-minute timer to try to accumulate as many points as possible.

=== Puzzle Mode ===
In Puzzle Mode, preset situations exist that need a specific configuration to cause explosions to clear the screen fully. Finishing all puzzles will unlock some secret modes.

=== Network Mode ===
In versions that support Network Mode, players could download a daily solvable puzzle, view posted high scores, and join contests.

=== Pieces ===
- Ka-Gloms: These are blocks made of Ka-Glom jelly. Place four Ka-Gloms of the same color next to each other and they will explode, also destroying all pieces they touch of that color. Ka-Gloms come in many colors. As play proceeds, new colors appear, making the game more difficult.
- Blocks: These do not ignite explosions, but participate in them if the color is right. Blocks will only explode if next to exploding pieces of the same color. Blocks can be used to separate Ka-Gloms to architect bigger explosions and get higher scores.
- Color Changers: These change all of the blocks and Ka-Gloms of the color of the piece they hit into the color of the Color Changer. The color of the Color Changer can be changed by pressing fire.
- Cement Pipes: These are the black sheep of special blocks. They can be destroyed by only the Driller or Color Bomb.
- Drillers: These do what the name implies. It drills straight through a full column, destroying all pieces in that column. No points are awarded for Ka-Gloms or blocks so cleared.
- Color Bombs: These destroy all the pieces of the color of the piece it falls on. If it falls on a Cement Pipe, it will destroy that pipe, but not affect other pipes on the board.
- Transmuters: These transform all Ka-Gloms of the color it hits into Blocks, and vice versa.

== Ports ==
Ka-Glom! was adapted to run on Apple's iOS devices in June 2009, with a new touch interface and revised graphics. In November 2009, Magmic re-released it as a free game on iTunes with a much improved touch interface. After this release, Ka-Glom soon reached the number-one downloaded free game on iTunes in Japan.
