= Sethanne Howard =

American astronomer

Sethanne Howard is a retired American research astronomer and physicist. She most recently worked as the Chief of the Nautical Almanac Office at the US Naval Observatory in Washington, DC. She is also a published author.

== Education ==
Howard attended the University of California, Davis from 1962 to 1965 and became the first woman to receive a Bachelor of Science degree (BS) in Physics from UCD. She continued her education at Rensselaer Polytechnic Institute from 1967 to 1974 and received a Master of Science (MS) degree in Nuclear physics. She went on to receive her PhD in astrophysics at Georgia State University from 1984 to 1989.

== Career and research ==
While at Georgia State University Howard worked as a visiting professor at Emory University in the Department of Physics as an astronomy professor from September 1985 to May 1986. She also taught at the College of St. Rose and Schenectady High School.

She conducted post-doctoral research at Los Alamos National Laboratory with the Space and Remote Sensing Sciences Group from January 1989 to January 1991. Following her post-doctoral research, she worked at the NASA Marshall Space Flight Center as a DBA for the Gamma Ray Observatory from January 1991 to January 1994. Continuing her work at NASA, she worked at the NASA Headquarters as an Astrophysics MO&DA from January 1995 to January 1998. Following her work at NASA, she worked at the National Science Foundation in the Division of Astronomical Sciences (AST) as a Program Officer for extra-galactic astronomy and cosmology from January 1998 to January 2000. Afterwards she worked as the Chief of the Nautical Almanac Office at the United States Naval Observatory from January 2000 until she retired in April 2004.

Howard has 75 research publications and 812 total citations. She was published in May 2020 by the Washington Academy of Science Journal alongside Gene Byrd for their research on NGC 4622: Unusual Spiral Density Waves and Calculated Disk surface Density.

== Honors and awards ==
- 1992: Featured Listee (Who’s Who in Science and Engineering)
- 2018: Inductee, Worldwide Lifetime Achievement

== Writing career ==
Howard is also an author and has published The Hidden Giants, which discusses the history of women in science, which dates back 4,000 years ago published in 2006. She authored a children's book, The Invisible Rabbit and the Invisible Carrot Bar published in 2008.
