= John Criswick =

Canadian businessman (born 1963)

- Born: December 1, 1963 (age 62)
- Education: University of British Columbia; York University; International Space University

John Criswick (born December 1, 1963) is a Canadian entrepreneur.

== Biography ==
After receiving his electrical engineering degree from the University of British Columbia in 1986, Criswick worked as a software engineer for Canadian Astronautics. In the early 1990s, he studied space physics at York University. While obtaining his master's degree, he worked at an observatory in Utah. In 1991, he attended International Space University in Toulouse, France.

In 1997, Criswick was contracted by Nortel Networks to source a web browser to work on a mobile device. When he discovered there was nothing compatible on the market, he and colleague Bob Tennant began to build a browser. Nortel agreed to fund the project, and by the end of 1997, Criswick and Tennant had decided to form their own company, Beduin Communications. Nortel paid $120,000 for a license to use the technology.

In 1998, Beduin Communications's Java browser was purchased by Sun Microsystems for US$20 million in stock.

Criswick has been involved in starting and operating over 45 companies, many of which are based in or near Ottawa. These include Zucotto Wireless, Magmic, Top Shelf Distillers, and Upper Narrows Retreat. In 2001, he co-founded Rove Mobile (previously known as Idokorro Mobile and Planetfred).

Criswick was among the first to sign up for one of Virgin Galactic's trips to space.

== Legacy ==
The main-belt asteroid named 29348 Criswick, discovered in 1995 by David D. Balam, is named after him.
