= List of minor planets: 809001–810000 =

The following is a partial list of minor planets, running from minor-planet number 809001 through 810000, inclusive. The primary data for this and other partial lists is based on JPL's "Small-Body Orbital Elements" and data available from the Minor Planet Center. Critical list information is also provided by the MPC, unless otherwise specified from Lowell Observatory. A detailed description of the table's columns and additional sources are given on the main page including a complete list of every page in this series, and a statistical break-up on the dynamical classification of minor planets.

Also see the summary list of all named bodies in numerical and alphabetical order, and the corresponding naming citations for the number range of this particular list. New namings may only be added to this list after official publication, as the preannouncement of names is condemned by the Working Group for Small Bodies Nomenclature of the International Astronomical Union.

Near-Earth obj.	MBA (inner)	MBA (outer)	Centaur
Mars-crosser	MBA (middle)	Jupiter trojan	Trans-Neptunian obj.
Unclassified

== 809001–809100 ==
Designation			Discovery			Properties		Ref
Permanent	Provisional	Named after	Date	Site	Discoverer(s)	Category	Diam.	Ref
809001	2018 VC_{162}	—	November 9, 2018	Haleakala	Pan-STARRS 2	·	1.2 km	MPC · JPL
809002	2018 VB_{163}	—	January 15, 2015	Mount Lemmon	Mount Lemmon Survey	·	1.5 km	MPC · JPL
809003	2018 VE_{163}	—	November 10, 2018	Mount Lemmon	Mount Lemmon Survey	HOF	1.6 km	MPC · JPL
809004	2018 VP_{166}	—	January 18, 2015	Mount Lemmon	Mount Lemmon Survey	·	1.5 km	MPC · JPL
809005	2018 VH_{168}	—	November 8, 2018	Mount Lemmon	Mount Lemmon Survey	·	970 m	MPC · JPL
809006	2018 VY_{169}	—	November 7, 2018	Mount Lemmon	Mount Lemmon Survey	·	1.1 km	MPC · JPL
809007	2018 VB_{170}	—	November 13, 2018	Haleakala	Pan-STARRS 2	HNS	820 m	MPC · JPL
809008	2018 VS_{170}	—	November 9, 2018	Haleakala	Pan-STARRS 2	·	820 m	MPC · JPL
809009	2018 VW_{175}	—	November 2, 2018	Mount Lemmon	Mount Lemmon Survey	·	2.0 km	MPC · JPL
809010	2018 VF_{176}	—	November 1, 2018	Mount Lemmon	Mount Lemmon Survey	·	1.6 km	MPC · JPL
809011	2018 VW_{177}	—	November 2, 2018	Haleakala	Pan-STARRS 2	·	1.2 km	MPC · JPL
809012	2018 VX_{177}	—	November 2, 2018	Haleakala	Pan-STARRS 2	·	2.3 km	MPC · JPL
809013	2018 VK_{178}	—	November 10, 2018	Haleakala	Pan-STARRS 2	TIR	1.6 km	MPC · JPL
809014	2018 VG_{181}	—	November 10, 2018	Haleakala	Pan-STARRS 2	TIR	2.1 km	MPC · JPL
809015	2018 VZ_{184}	—	November 14, 2018	Haleakala	Pan-STARRS 2	·	2.0 km	MPC · JPL
809016	2018 VE_{188}	—	November 8, 2018	Mount Lemmon	Mount Lemmon Survey	·	1.4 km	MPC · JPL
809017	2018 VN_{189}	—	November 14, 2018	Haleakala	Pan-STARRS 2	·	1.1 km	MPC · JPL
809018	2018 VR_{190}	—	September 23, 2008	Mount Lemmon	Mount Lemmon Survey	·	1.4 km	MPC · JPL
809019	2018 VG_{193}	—	November 2, 2018	Mount Lemmon	Mount Lemmon Survey	·	1.3 km	MPC · JPL
809020	2018 VG_{198}	—	November 1, 2018	Mount Lemmon	Mount Lemmon Survey	·	1.1 km	MPC · JPL
809021	2018 VR_{202}	—	November 9, 2018	Haleakala	Pan-STARRS 2	·	1.4 km	MPC · JPL
809022	2018 WK_{1}	—	February 20, 2014	Kitt Peak	Spacewatch	·	1.5 km	MPC · JPL
809023	2018 WK_{4}	—	November 17, 2018	Mount Lemmon	Mount Lemmon Survey	·	1.1 km	MPC · JPL
809024	2018 WT_{4}	—	November 28, 2018	Mount Lemmon	Mount Lemmon Survey	·	2.5 km	MPC · JPL
809025	2018 WW_{5}	—	April 18, 2015	Cerro Tololo	DECam	·	1.5 km	MPC · JPL
809026	2018 WA_{6}	—	November 29, 2018	Mount Lemmon	Mount Lemmon Survey	·	2.0 km	MPC · JPL
809027	2018 WB_{6}	—	November 18, 2018	Mount Lemmon	Mount Lemmon Survey	·	2.2 km	MPC · JPL
809028	2018 WF_{6}	—	November 19, 2018	Mount Lemmon	Mount Lemmon Survey	·	1.9 km	MPC · JPL
809029	2018 WH_{6}	—	November 17, 2018	Mount Lemmon	Mount Lemmon Survey	AGN	750 m	MPC · JPL
809030	2018 WY_{6}	—	September 18, 2018	Mount Lemmon	Mount Lemmon Survey	·	2.5 km	MPC · JPL
809031	2018 WS_{7}	—	November 17, 2018	Mount Lemmon	Mount Lemmon Survey	·	1.4 km	MPC · JPL
809032	2018 WW_{7}	—	December 21, 2012	Haleakala	Pan-STARRS 1	T_{j} (2.84)	2.3 km	MPC · JPL
809033	2018 WB_{8}	—	November 17, 2018	Mount Lemmon	Mount Lemmon Survey	·	1.9 km	MPC · JPL
809034	2018 WE_{8}	—	November 17, 2018	Mount Lemmon	Mount Lemmon Survey	·	2.2 km	MPC · JPL
809035	2018 WG_{9}	—	November 17, 2018	Mount Lemmon	Mount Lemmon Survey	(5)	880 m	MPC · JPL
809036	2018 WH_{9}	—	August 30, 2005	Campo Imperatore	CINEOS	EUN	900 m	MPC · JPL
809037	2018 WS_{11}	—	November 29, 2018	Mount Lemmon	Mount Lemmon Survey	EOS	1.2 km	MPC · JPL
809038	2018 WC_{15}	—	May 1, 2016	Cerro Tololo	DECam	·	1.3 km	MPC · JPL
809039	2018 WJ_{17}	—	November 17, 2018	Mount Lemmon	Mount Lemmon Survey	THB	1.7 km	MPC · JPL
809040	2018 WX_{17}	—	November 28, 2018	Mount Lemmon	Mount Lemmon Survey	·	1.6 km	MPC · JPL
809041	2018 WW_{18}	—	November 28, 2018	Mount Lemmon	Mount Lemmon Survey	·	2.5 km	MPC · JPL
809042	2018 WA_{19}	—	November 29, 2018	Mount Lemmon	Mount Lemmon Survey	EOS	1.2 km	MPC · JPL
809043	2018 XZ_{1}	—	December 9, 2018	Catalina	CSS	AMO	410 m	MPC · JPL
809044	2018 XF_{6}	—	April 10, 2015	Mount Lemmon	Mount Lemmon Survey	·	1.8 km	MPC · JPL
809045	2018 XP_{8}	—	November 27, 2013	Haleakala	Pan-STARRS 1	·	1.0 km	MPC · JPL
809046	2018 XA_{11}	—	July 4, 2017	Haleakala	Pan-STARRS 1	AGN	930 m	MPC · JPL
809047	2018 XN_{13}	—	October 25, 2009	Mount Lemmon	Mount Lemmon Survey	EUN	1.0 km	MPC · JPL
809048	2018 XN_{14}	—	November 7, 2018	Palomar Mountain	Zwicky Transient Facility	T_{j} (2.96)	2.3 km	MPC · JPL
809049	2018 XT_{15}	—	November 6, 2018	Haleakala	Pan-STARRS 2	TIR	1.9 km	MPC · JPL
809050	2018 XQ_{19}	—	November 12, 2007	Mount Lemmon	Mount Lemmon Survey	TIR	2.2 km	MPC · JPL
809051	2018 XL_{20}	—	November 12, 2018	Haleakala	Pan-STARRS 2	T_{j} (2.94)	1.9 km	MPC · JPL
809052	2018 XS_{21}	—	December 14, 2018	Haleakala	Pan-STARRS 1	·	1.9 km	MPC · JPL
809053	2018 XN_{22}	—	December 12, 2018	Haleakala	Pan-STARRS 1	·	2.0 km	MPC · JPL
809054	2018 XR_{23}	—	December 14, 2018	Haleakala	Pan-STARRS 1	H	460 m	MPC · JPL
809055	2018 XA_{24}	—	December 9, 2018	Mount Lemmon	Mount Lemmon Survey	·	1.9 km	MPC · JPL
809056	2018 XT_{24}	—	December 14, 2018	Haleakala	Pan-STARRS 1	EOS	1.3 km	MPC · JPL
809057	2018 XW_{24}	—	December 14, 2018	Haleakala	Pan-STARRS 1	HYG	1.7 km	MPC · JPL
809058	2018 XA_{25}	—	December 14, 2018	Haleakala	Pan-STARRS 1	·	1.4 km	MPC · JPL
809059	2018 XL_{25}	—	December 12, 2018	Haleakala	Pan-STARRS 1	·	2.3 km	MPC · JPL
809060	2018 XM_{25}	—	December 10, 2018	Mount Lemmon	Mount Lemmon Survey	·	1.9 km	MPC · JPL
809061	2018 XO_{25}	—	December 10, 2018	Mount Lemmon	Mount Lemmon Survey	·	1.9 km	MPC · JPL
809062	2018 XW_{25}	—	December 14, 2018	Haleakala	Pan-STARRS 1	·	2.3 km	MPC · JPL
809063	2018 XJ_{26}	—	December 15, 2018	Haleakala	Pan-STARRS 1	TIR	2.2 km	MPC · JPL
809064	2018 XN_{27}	—	December 12, 2018	Haleakala	Pan-STARRS 1	·	2.4 km	MPC · JPL
809065	2018 XS_{28}	—	April 18, 2015	Cerro Tololo	DECam	·	1.5 km	MPC · JPL
809066	2018 XU_{28}	—	December 15, 2018	Haleakala	Pan-STARRS 1	TIR	1.6 km	MPC · JPL
809067	2018 XE_{30}	—	December 13, 2018	Haleakala	Pan-STARRS 1	·	920 m	MPC · JPL
809068	2018 XZ_{30}	—	December 14, 2018	Haleakala	Pan-STARRS 1	·	1.5 km	MPC · JPL
809069	2018 XP_{31}	—	May 20, 2015	Cerro Tololo	DECam	·	1.3 km	MPC · JPL
809070	2018 XQ_{31}	—	December 10, 2018	Mount Lemmon	Mount Lemmon Survey	·	1.7 km	MPC · JPL
809071	2018 XH_{34}	—	December 14, 2018	Haleakala	Pan-STARRS 1	·	1.7 km	MPC · JPL
809072	2018 XK_{34}	—	December 13, 2018	Haleakala	Pan-STARRS 1	ADE	1.4 km	MPC · JPL
809073	2018 XA_{35}	—	December 14, 2018	Haleakala	Pan-STARRS 1	EOS	1.1 km	MPC · JPL
809074	2018 XB_{35}	—	December 13, 2018	Haleakala	Pan-STARRS 1	·	2.2 km	MPC · JPL
809075	2018 XF_{36}	—	December 13, 2018	Haleakala	Pan-STARRS 1	ELF	2.5 km	MPC · JPL
809076	2018 XN_{36}	—	January 21, 2015	Haleakala	Pan-STARRS 1	EUN	930 m	MPC · JPL
809077	2018 XU_{36}	—	December 12, 2018	Haleakala	Pan-STARRS 1	EUN	930 m	MPC · JPL
809078	2018 XF_{37}	—	December 14, 2018	Haleakala	Pan-STARRS 1	·	1.8 km	MPC · JPL
809079	2018 XY_{38}	—	December 10, 2018	Mount Lemmon	Mount Lemmon Survey	·	1.6 km	MPC · JPL
809080	2018 XV_{41}	—	December 4, 2018	Mount Lemmon	Mount Lemmon Survey	·	1.4 km	MPC · JPL
809081	2018 XW_{43}	—	December 4, 2018	Mount Lemmon	Mount Lemmon Survey	·	1.6 km	MPC · JPL
809082	2018 XL_{44}	—	December 4, 2018	Mount Lemmon	Mount Lemmon Survey	·	1.8 km	MPC · JPL
809083	2018 XM_{47}	—	December 12, 2018	Haleakala	Pan-STARRS 1	·	1.7 km	MPC · JPL
809084	2018 XQ_{51}	—	December 14, 2018	Haleakala	Pan-STARRS 1	·	1.9 km	MPC · JPL
809085	2018 XB_{52}	—	December 13, 2018	Haleakala	Pan-STARRS 1	·	1.2 km	MPC · JPL
809086	2018 YK_{1}	—	October 1, 2017	Mount Lemmon	Mount Lemmon Survey	EUP	2.6 km	MPC · JPL
809087	2018 YH_{5}	—	January 9, 2019	Haleakala	Pan-STARRS 1	·	770 m	MPC · JPL
809088	2018 YU_{6}	—	December 31, 2018	Haleakala	Pan-STARRS 1	·	1.8 km	MPC · JPL
809089	2018 YE_{7}	—	January 3, 2019	Haleakala	Pan-STARRS 1	·	1.5 km	MPC · JPL
809090	2018 YS_{7}	—	December 18, 2018	Haleakala	Pan-STARRS 1	·	2.5 km	MPC · JPL
809091	2018 YJ_{8}	—	May 12, 2015	Mount Lemmon	Mount Lemmon Survey	·	1.3 km	MPC · JPL
809092	2018 YX_{8}	—	November 10, 2018	Mount Lemmon	Mount Lemmon Survey	·	2.2 km	MPC · JPL
809093	2018 YA_{9}	—	December 17, 2018	Haleakala	Pan-STARRS 1	·	1.5 km	MPC · JPL
809094	2018 YE_{9}	—	December 17, 2018	Haleakala	Pan-STARRS 1	LIX	2.2 km	MPC · JPL
809095	2018 YE_{10}	—	May 18, 2015	Haleakala	Pan-STARRS 1	EOS	1.3 km	MPC · JPL
809096	2018 YR_{10}	—	December 16, 2018	Haleakala	Pan-STARRS 1	·	1.5 km	MPC · JPL
809097	2018 YS_{10}	—	December 17, 2018	Haleakala	Pan-STARRS 1	·	1.9 km	MPC · JPL
809098	2018 YT_{10}	—	December 17, 2018	Haleakala	Pan-STARRS 1	·	1.6 km	MPC · JPL
809099	2018 YT_{11}	—	December 16, 2018	Haleakala	Pan-STARRS 1	·	1.8 km	MPC · JPL
809100	2018 YK_{14}	—	December 16, 2018	Haleakala	Pan-STARRS 1	·	1.4 km	MPC · JPL

== 809101–809200 ==
back to top

Designation			Discovery			Properties		Ref
Permanent	Provisional	Named after	Date	Site	Discoverer(s)	Category	Diam.	Ref
809101	2018 YJ_{16}	—	May 20, 2015	Cerro Tololo	DECam	EOS	1.3 km	MPC · JPL
809102	2018 YJ_{17}	—	December 31, 2018	Haleakala	Pan-STARRS 1	·	1.8 km	MPC · JPL
809103	2018 YP_{17}	—	December 17, 2018	Haleakala	Pan-STARRS 1	·	2.0 km	MPC · JPL
809104	2018 YS_{17}	—	December 31, 2018	Haleakala	Pan-STARRS 1	EOS	1.2 km	MPC · JPL
809105	2018 YT_{18}	—	October 28, 2008	Mount Lemmon	Mount Lemmon Survey	AGN	870 m	MPC · JPL
809106	2018 YB_{21}	—	December 16, 2018	Haleakala	Pan-STARRS 1	LIX	2.2 km	MPC · JPL
809107	2018 YV_{23}	—	December 17, 2018	Palomar Mountain	Zwicky Transient Facility	·	1.9 km	MPC · JPL
809108	2018 YE_{24}	—	December 16, 2018	Haleakala	Pan-STARRS 1	·	1.6 km	MPC · JPL
809109	2018 YJ_{24}	—	December 31, 2018	Haleakala	Pan-STARRS 1	·	2.1 km	MPC · JPL
809110	2018 YZ_{24}	—	April 18, 2015	Mount Lemmon	Mount Lemmon Survey	EOS	1.3 km	MPC · JPL
809111	2018 YY_{27}	—	December 16, 2018	Haleakala	Pan-STARRS 1	·	1.9 km	MPC · JPL
809112	2019 AK	—	December 2, 2015	Catalina	CSS	H	540 m	MPC · JPL
809113	2019 AZ_{4}	—	November 14, 2015	Mount Lemmon	Mount Lemmon Survey	H	530 m	MPC · JPL
809114	2019 AB_{6}	—	September 21, 1998	Kitt Peak	Spacewatch	H	450 m	MPC · JPL
809115	2019 AN_{15}	—	April 8, 2014	Mount Lemmon	Mount Lemmon Survey	·	2.4 km	MPC · JPL
809116	2019 AR_{15}	—	November 7, 2018	Mount Lemmon	Mount Lemmon Survey	·	1.8 km	MPC · JPL
809117	2019 AW_{15}	—	October 6, 2012	Mount Lemmon	Mount Lemmon Survey	TIR	1.9 km	MPC · JPL
809118	2019 AK_{16}	—	January 9, 2014	Mount Lemmon	Mount Lemmon Survey	·	1.5 km	MPC · JPL
809119	2019 AB_{18}	—	December 14, 2018	Haleakala	Pan-STARRS 1	·	2.2 km	MPC · JPL
809120	2019 AM_{20}	—	December 16, 2018	Palomar Mountain	Zwicky Transient Facility	·	1.8 km	MPC · JPL
809121	2019 AA_{22}	—	December 10, 2018	Mount Lemmon	Mount Lemmon Survey	·	2.5 km	MPC · JPL
809122	2019 AY_{22}	—	January 7, 2019	Haleakala	Pan-STARRS 1	·	1.8 km	MPC · JPL
809123	2019 AT_{23}	—	January 7, 2019	Haleakala	Pan-STARRS 1	·	2.2 km	MPC · JPL
809124	2019 AU_{25}	—	June 2, 2008	Mount Lemmon	Mount Lemmon Survey	·	1.5 km	MPC · JPL
809125	2019 AQ_{26}	—	August 7, 2016	Haleakala	Pan-STARRS 1	EOS	1.3 km	MPC · JPL
809126	2019 AW_{27}	—	November 14, 2018	Haleakala	Pan-STARRS 2	·	2.1 km	MPC · JPL
809127	2019 AU_{28}	—	May 1, 2011	Haleakala	Pan-STARRS 1	H	460 m	MPC · JPL
809128	2019 AL_{30}	—	April 20, 2014	Mount Lemmon	Mount Lemmon Survey	·	2.1 km	MPC · JPL
809129	2019 AO_{30}	—	January 2, 2019	Haleakala	Pan-STARRS 1	·	1.9 km	MPC · JPL
809130	2019 AG_{32}	—	March 30, 2015	Haleakala	Pan-STARRS 1	·	2.7 km	MPC · JPL
809131	2019 AP_{32}	—	March 3, 2014	Cerro Tololo	High Cadence Transient Survey	·	1.9 km	MPC · JPL
809132	2019 AX_{34}	—	December 11, 2013	Mount Lemmon	Mount Lemmon Survey	·	1.6 km	MPC · JPL
809133	2019 AR_{35}	—	January 28, 2014	Kitt Peak	Spacewatch	·	1.6 km	MPC · JPL
809134	2019 AE_{40}	—	August 26, 2012	Haleakala	Pan-STARRS 1	·	1.3 km	MPC · JPL
809135	2019 AP_{41}	—	January 13, 2019	Haleakala	Pan-STARRS 1	·	1.4 km	MPC · JPL
809136	2019 AX_{41}	—	May 21, 2015	Haleakala	Pan-STARRS 1	·	2.0 km	MPC · JPL
809137	2019 AQ_{42}	—	January 8, 2019	Haleakala	Pan-STARRS 1	·	1.3 km	MPC · JPL
809138	2019 AB_{45}	—	January 3, 2019	Haleakala	Pan-STARRS 1	·	1.5 km	MPC · JPL
809139	2019 AF_{45}	—	January 3, 2019	Haleakala	Pan-STARRS 1	THB	1.8 km	MPC · JPL
809140	2019 AJ_{45}	—	January 3, 2019	Haleakala	Pan-STARRS 1	·	1.5 km	MPC · JPL
809141	2019 AS_{46}	—	February 24, 2014	Haleakala	Pan-STARRS 1	TIR	1.8 km	MPC · JPL
809142	2019 AJ_{47}	—	January 1, 2019	Haleakala	Pan-STARRS 1	T_{j} (2.97)	2.3 km	MPC · JPL
809143	2019 AR_{47}	—	November 2, 2007	Mount Lemmon	Mount Lemmon Survey	·	1.3 km	MPC · JPL
809144	2019 AJ_{48}	—	February 26, 2014	Haleakala	Pan-STARRS 1	·	1.6 km	MPC · JPL
809145	2019 AO_{48}	—	January 4, 2019	Mount Lemmon	Mount Lemmon Survey	·	2.2 km	MPC · JPL
809146	2019 AB_{49}	—	February 14, 2008	Mount Lemmon	Mount Lemmon Survey	·	1.8 km	MPC · JPL
809147	2019 AJ_{49}	—	January 10, 2019	Haleakala	Pan-STARRS 1	·	1.4 km	MPC · JPL
809148	2019 AK_{50}	—	January 8, 2019	Haleakala	Pan-STARRS 1	·	2.1 km	MPC · JPL
809149	2019 AS_{50}	—	February 2, 2008	Kitt Peak	Spacewatch	·	1.9 km	MPC · JPL
809150	2019 AB_{51}	—	January 3, 2019	Haleakala	Pan-STARRS 1	·	1.7 km	MPC · JPL
809151	2019 AU_{51}	—	April 28, 2014	Cerro Tololo	DECam	·	1.9 km	MPC · JPL
809152	2019 AG_{52}	—	January 8, 2019	Haleakala	Pan-STARRS 1	critical	2.2 km	MPC · JPL
809153	2019 AA_{53}	—	January 3, 2019	Haleakala	Pan-STARRS 1	·	1.9 km	MPC · JPL
809154	2019 AF_{55}	—	January 9, 2019	Haleakala	Pan-STARRS 1	GAL	1.1 km	MPC · JPL
809155	2019 AM_{55}	—	January 9, 2019	Haleakala	Pan-STARRS 1	·	1.4 km	MPC · JPL
809156	2019 AY_{55}	—	January 4, 2019	Mount Lemmon	Mount Lemmon Survey	EOS	1.4 km	MPC · JPL
809157	2019 AH_{56}	—	September 16, 2017	Haleakala	Pan-STARRS 1	·	2.0 km	MPC · JPL
809158	2019 AK_{56}	—	January 8, 2019	Haleakala	Pan-STARRS 1	·	2.1 km	MPC · JPL
809159	2019 AO_{56}	—	January 8, 2019	Haleakala	Pan-STARRS 1	·	1.8 km	MPC · JPL
809160	2019 AH_{57}	—	September 17, 2017	Haleakala	Pan-STARRS 1	KOR	920 m	MPC · JPL
809161	2019 AP_{57}	—	January 8, 2019	Haleakala	Pan-STARRS 1	·	1.3 km	MPC · JPL
809162	2019 AZ_{57}	—	January 10, 2019	Haleakala	Pan-STARRS 1	·	1.2 km	MPC · JPL
809163	2019 AV_{58}	—	January 2, 2019	Haleakala	Pan-STARRS 1	THB	2.7 km	MPC · JPL
809164	2019 AA_{59}	—	March 29, 2011	Kitt Peak	Spacewatch	DOR	1.8 km	MPC · JPL
809165	2019 AZ_{59}	—	January 7, 2019	Haleakala	Pan-STARRS 1	·	2.2 km	MPC · JPL
809166	2019 AA_{60}	—	January 3, 2019	Haleakala	Pan-STARRS 1	TIR	1.8 km	MPC · JPL
809167	2019 AH_{60}	—	January 8, 2019	Haleakala	Pan-STARRS 1	·	1.7 km	MPC · JPL
809168	2019 AL_{60}	—	January 10, 2019	Haleakala	Pan-STARRS 1	·	2.2 km	MPC · JPL
809169	2019 AW_{60}	—	January 4, 2019	Haleakala	Pan-STARRS 1	·	2.7 km	MPC · JPL
809170	2019 AC_{61}	—	January 14, 2019	Haleakala	Pan-STARRS 1	·	2.0 km	MPC · JPL
809171	2019 AD_{61}	—	January 3, 2019	Haleakala	Pan-STARRS 1	·	2.0 km	MPC · JPL
809172	2019 AL_{61}	—	January 8, 2019	Haleakala	Pan-STARRS 1	·	1.7 km	MPC · JPL
809173	2019 AN_{61}	—	January 7, 2019	Haleakala	Pan-STARRS 1	·	1.8 km	MPC · JPL
809174	2019 AW_{61}	—	January 9, 2019	Haleakala	Pan-STARRS 1	WIT	730 m	MPC · JPL
809175	2019 AZ_{61}	—	January 7, 2019	Haleakala	Pan-STARRS 1	·	1.8 km	MPC · JPL
809176	2019 AH_{63}	—	October 12, 2006	Kitt Peak	Spacewatch	·	1.8 km	MPC · JPL
809177	2019 AV_{63}	—	January 2, 2013	San Pedro de Atacama	Oreshko, A.	·	2.4 km	MPC · JPL
809178	2019 AY_{63}	—	January 7, 2019	Haleakala	Pan-STARRS 1	H	450 m	MPC · JPL
809179	2019 AR_{64}	—	May 20, 2015	Cerro Tololo	DECam	EOS	1.1 km	MPC · JPL
809180	2019 AV_{64}	—	January 4, 2019	Haleakala	Pan-STARRS 1	TIR	1.8 km	MPC · JPL
809181	2019 AL_{65}	—	January 14, 2019	Haleakala	Pan-STARRS 1	·	1.6 km	MPC · JPL
809182	2019 AZ_{65}	—	January 2, 2019	Haleakala	Pan-STARRS 1	·	810 m	MPC · JPL
809183	2019 AF_{66}	—	January 8, 2019	Haleakala	Pan-STARRS 1	·	2.1 km	MPC · JPL
809184	2019 AJ_{66}	—	January 8, 2019	Haleakala	Pan-STARRS 1	EOS	1.2 km	MPC · JPL
809185	2019 AN_{66}	—	January 14, 2019	Haleakala	Pan-STARRS 1	·	1.4 km	MPC · JPL
809186	2019 AF_{67}	—	January 8, 2019	Haleakala	Pan-STARRS 1	·	2.1 km	MPC · JPL
809187	2019 AG_{67}	—	January 3, 2019	Haleakala	Pan-STARRS 1	·	2.0 km	MPC · JPL
809188	2019 AS_{67}	—	January 14, 2019	Haleakala	Pan-STARRS 1	·	1.8 km	MPC · JPL
809189	2019 AG_{68}	—	January 4, 2019	Haleakala	Pan-STARRS 1	·	1.9 km	MPC · JPL
809190	2019 AT_{68}	—	January 8, 2019	Haleakala	Pan-STARRS 1	·	2.1 km	MPC · JPL
809191	2019 AX_{69}	—	January 3, 2019	Haleakala	Pan-STARRS 1	EOS	1.4 km	MPC · JPL
809192	2019 AH_{70}	—	January 3, 2019	Haleakala	Pan-STARRS 1	·	2.0 km	MPC · JPL
809193	2019 AP_{70}	—	January 10, 2019	Haleakala	Pan-STARRS 1	·	1.6 km	MPC · JPL
809194	2019 AW_{70}	—	May 21, 2015	Haleakala	Pan-STARRS 1	·	1.3 km	MPC · JPL
809195	2019 AC_{71}	—	May 20, 2015	Cerro Tololo	DECam	·	1.2 km	MPC · JPL
809196	2019 AZ_{71}	—	September 17, 2017	Haleakala	Pan-STARRS 1	KOR	950 m	MPC · JPL
809197	2019 AE_{72}	—	January 4, 2019	Haleakala	Pan-STARRS 1	·	1.4 km	MPC · JPL
809198	2019 AF_{72}	—	January 8, 2019	Mount Lemmon	Mount Lemmon Survey	·	2.2 km	MPC · JPL
809199	2019 AM_{72}	—	January 7, 2019	Haleakala	Pan-STARRS 1	·	1.9 km	MPC · JPL
809200	2019 AC_{73}	—	January 10, 2019	Haleakala	Pan-STARRS 1	·	2.1 km	MPC · JPL

== 809201–809300 ==
back to top

Designation			Discovery			Properties		Ref
Permanent	Provisional	Named after	Date	Site	Discoverer(s)	Category	Diam.	Ref
809201	2019 AB_{75}	—	January 8, 2019	Haleakala	Pan-STARRS 1	·	1.7 km	MPC · JPL
809202	2019 AU_{75}	—	January 9, 2019	Haleakala	Pan-STARRS 1	·	1.1 km	MPC · JPL
809203	2019 AK_{77}	—	January 4, 2019	Haleakala	Pan-STARRS 1	·	2.1 km	MPC · JPL
809204	2019 AR_{77}	—	January 8, 2019	Haleakala	Pan-STARRS 1	·	2.7 km	MPC · JPL
809205	2019 AC_{79}	—	January 2, 2019	Haleakala	Pan-STARRS 1	HYG	1.7 km	MPC · JPL
809206	2019 AF_{79}	—	August 1, 2016	Haleakala	Pan-STARRS 1	ELF	2.2 km	MPC · JPL
809207	2019 AX_{79}	—	January 8, 2019	Haleakala	Pan-STARRS 1	·	2.1 km	MPC · JPL
809208	2019 AZ_{80}	—	August 24, 2017	Haleakala	Pan-STARRS 1	·	1.2 km	MPC · JPL
809209	2019 AY_{81}	—	January 4, 2019	Mount Lemmon	Mount Lemmon Survey	EOS	1.3 km	MPC · JPL
809210	2019 AC_{82}	—	May 20, 2015	Cerro Tololo	DECam	·	1.4 km	MPC · JPL
809211	2019 AJ_{82}	—	August 2, 2016	Haleakala	Pan-STARRS 1	·	1.8 km	MPC · JPL
809212	2019 AL_{82}	—	January 4, 2019	Haleakala	Pan-STARRS 1	·	2.3 km	MPC · JPL
809213	2019 AM_{82}	—	January 3, 2019	Haleakala	Pan-STARRS 1	·	2.1 km	MPC · JPL
809214	2019 AO_{82}	—	April 18, 2015	Cerro Tololo	DECam	·	1.4 km	MPC · JPL
809215	2019 AF_{83}	—	April 19, 2015	Cerro Tololo	DECam	KOR	910 m	MPC · JPL
809216	2019 AS_{83}	—	January 9, 2019	Haleakala	Pan-STARRS 1	KOR	920 m	MPC · JPL
809217	2019 AT_{83}	—	January 1, 2019	Haleakala	Pan-STARRS 1	T_{j} (2.99) · EUP	2.4 km	MPC · JPL
809218	2019 AU_{83}	—	January 14, 2019	Haleakala	Pan-STARRS 1	VER	1.7 km	MPC · JPL
809219	2019 AK_{84}	—	September 19, 2017	Haleakala	Pan-STARRS 1	·	1.2 km	MPC · JPL
809220	2019 AD_{85}	—	January 9, 2019	Haleakala	Pan-STARRS 1	·	1.8 km	MPC · JPL
809221	2019 AM_{87}	—	January 8, 2019	Haleakala	Pan-STARRS 1	·	1.5 km	MPC · JPL
809222	2019 AB_{89}	—	January 3, 2019	Haleakala	Pan-STARRS 1	·	2.3 km	MPC · JPL
809223	2019 AU_{91}	—	January 3, 2019	Haleakala	Pan-STARRS 1	·	1.7 km	MPC · JPL
809224	2019 AK_{92}	—	January 8, 2019	Haleakala	Pan-STARRS 1	·	2.4 km	MPC · JPL
809225	2019 AL_{92}	—	January 8, 2019	Haleakala	Pan-STARRS 1	·	1.5 km	MPC · JPL
809226	2019 AK_{93}	—	January 7, 2019	Haleakala	Pan-STARRS 1	·	2.1 km	MPC · JPL
809227	2019 AP_{97}	—	October 23, 2017	Mount Lemmon	Mount Lemmon Survey	EOS	1.3 km	MPC · JPL
809228	2019 AB_{98}	—	January 8, 2019	Haleakala	Pan-STARRS 1	·	1.5 km	MPC · JPL
809229	2019 AS_{98}	—	January 10, 2019	Haleakala	Pan-STARRS 1	·	1.7 km	MPC · JPL
809230	2019 AN_{99}	—	January 8, 2019	Haleakala	Pan-STARRS 1	·	2.5 km	MPC · JPL
809231	2019 AV_{99}	—	May 21, 2015	Haleakala	Pan-STARRS 1	·	1.4 km	MPC · JPL
809232	2019 AK_{104}	—	January 9, 2019	Haleakala	Pan-STARRS 1	·	1.5 km	MPC · JPL
809233	2019 AQ_{104}	—	January 9, 2019	Haleakala	Pan-STARRS 1	·	1.3 km	MPC · JPL
809234	2019 AV_{104}	—	January 3, 2019	Haleakala	Pan-STARRS 1	·	2.1 km	MPC · JPL
809235	2019 AC_{110}	—	January 4, 2019	Haleakala	Pan-STARRS 1	·	2.0 km	MPC · JPL
809236	2019 AR_{110}	—	October 28, 2017	Mount Lemmon	Mount Lemmon Survey	·	1.6 km	MPC · JPL
809237	2019 AW_{112}	—	January 14, 2019	Haleakala	Pan-STARRS 1	·	1.8 km	MPC · JPL
809238	2019 AX_{112}	—	January 3, 2019	Haleakala	Pan-STARRS 1	EOS	1.2 km	MPC · JPL
809239	2019 AR_{113}	—	November 14, 2017	Mount Lemmon	Mount Lemmon Survey	EOS	1.3 km	MPC · JPL
809240	2019 AS_{114}	—	May 11, 2016	Mount Lemmon	Mount Lemmon Survey	TIN	770 m	MPC · JPL
809241	2019 AT_{115}	—	January 21, 2015	Haleakala	Pan-STARRS 1	·	1.1 km	MPC · JPL
809242	2019 AX_{115}	—	January 3, 2019	Haleakala	Pan-STARRS 1	·	1.3 km	MPC · JPL
809243	2019 AH_{116}	—	October 23, 2013	Mount Lemmon	Mount Lemmon Survey	·	1.0 km	MPC · JPL
809244	2019 AZ_{116}	—	January 3, 2019	Haleakala	Pan-STARRS 1	·	1.3 km	MPC · JPL
809245	2019 AG_{117}	—	January 4, 2019	Mount Lemmon	Mount Lemmon Survey	·	2.3 km	MPC · JPL
809246	2019 AK_{117}	—	January 14, 2019	Haleakala	Pan-STARRS 1	EOS	1.3 km	MPC · JPL
809247	2019 AQ_{118}	—	January 8, 2019	Haleakala	Pan-STARRS 1	·	2.1 km	MPC · JPL
809248	2019 AJ_{119}	—	January 14, 2019	Haleakala	Pan-STARRS 1	·	1.5 km	MPC · JPL
809249	2019 AK_{124}	—	January 2, 2019	Haleakala	Pan-STARRS 1	·	1.8 km	MPC · JPL
809250	2019 AE_{125}	—	January 8, 2019	Haleakala	Pan-STARRS 1	·	1.9 km	MPC · JPL
809251	2019 AL_{126}	—	January 9, 2019	Haleakala	Pan-STARRS 1	·	1.6 km	MPC · JPL
809252	2019 AJ_{128}	—	January 7, 2019	Haleakala	Pan-STARRS 1	·	1.8 km	MPC · JPL
809253	2019 AL_{130}	—	January 13, 2019	Haleakala	Pan-STARRS 1	·	2.4 km	MPC · JPL
809254	2019 AU_{130}	—	January 12, 2019	Haleakala	Pan-STARRS 1	·	2.1 km	MPC · JPL
809255	2019 AF_{131}	—	January 10, 2019	Haleakala	Pan-STARRS 1	·	2.0 km	MPC · JPL
809256	2019 AQ_{131}	—	January 15, 2019	Haleakala	Pan-STARRS 2	TIR	1.4 km	MPC · JPL
809257	2019 AF_{133}	—	February 14, 2008	Catalina	CSS	·	1.7 km	MPC · JPL
809258	2019 AQ_{133}	—	January 2, 2019	Haleakala	Pan-STARRS 1	·	1.9 km	MPC · JPL
809259	2019 AW_{133}	—	January 7, 2019	Haleakala	Pan-STARRS 1	·	1.2 km	MPC · JPL
809260	2019 AH_{137}	—	January 13, 2019	Haleakala	Pan-STARRS 1	·	1.7 km	MPC · JPL
809261	2019 AQ_{140}	—	January 8, 2019	Haleakala	Pan-STARRS 1	·	1.5 km	MPC · JPL
809262	2019 AB_{142}	—	January 8, 2019	Haleakala	Pan-STARRS 1	·	1.7 km	MPC · JPL
809263	2019 AD_{143}	—	January 10, 2014	Mount Lemmon	Mount Lemmon Survey	·	1.7 km	MPC · JPL
809264	2019 AZ_{146}	—	January 17, 2013	Haleakala	Pan-STARRS 1	·	2.0 km	MPC · JPL
809265	2019 AO_{149}	—	January 10, 2019	Haleakala	Pan-STARRS 1	·	2.2 km	MPC · JPL
809266	2019 BT	—	November 4, 2007	Mount Lemmon	Mount Lemmon Survey	T_{j} (2.88)	1.9 km	MPC · JPL
809267	2019 BF_{7}	—	December 18, 2018	Haleakala	Pan-STARRS 1	·	2.5 km	MPC · JPL
809268	2019 BH_{7}	—	October 25, 2012	Mount Lemmon	Mount Lemmon Survey	·	1.7 km	MPC · JPL
809269	2019 BV_{9}	—	January 16, 2019	Haleakala	Pan-STARRS 1	·	1.3 km	MPC · JPL
809270	2019 BW_{9}	—	January 16, 2019	Haleakala	Pan-STARRS 1	·	2.0 km	MPC · JPL
809271	2019 BC_{10}	—	January 16, 2019	Haleakala	Pan-STARRS 1	·	1.8 km	MPC · JPL
809272	2019 BE_{10}	—	January 16, 2019	Haleakala	Pan-STARRS 1	·	1.0 km	MPC · JPL
809273	2019 BZ_{10}	—	August 12, 2016	Haleakala	Pan-STARRS 1	EOS	1.6 km	MPC · JPL
809274	2019 BL_{11}	—	January 16, 2019	Haleakala	Pan-STARRS 1	·	1.6 km	MPC · JPL
809275	2019 BX_{12}	—	January 25, 2019	Haleakala	Pan-STARRS 1	·	2.0 km	MPC · JPL
809276	2019 CU_{7}	—	January 29, 2014	Kitt Peak	Spacewatch	·	2.1 km	MPC · JPL
809277	2019 CN_{8}	—	January 3, 2019	Haleakala	Pan-STARRS 1	·	2.5 km	MPC · JPL
809278	2019 CX_{8}	—	June 26, 2015	Haleakala	Pan-STARRS 1	THM	1.7 km	MPC · JPL
809279	2019 CU_{12}	—	April 6, 2014	Mount Lemmon	Mount Lemmon Survey	·	2.0 km	MPC · JPL
809280	2019 CE_{13}	—	February 8, 2019	Mount Lemmon	Mount Lemmon Survey	·	1.2 km	MPC · JPL
809281	2019 CS_{13}	—	April 28, 2014	Cerro Tololo	DECam	·	2.3 km	MPC · JPL
809282	2019 CT_{13}	—	February 4, 2019	Haleakala	Pan-STARRS 2	·	2.3 km	MPC · JPL
809283	2019 CV_{13}	—	February 5, 2019	Haleakala	Pan-STARRS 1	·	2.2 km	MPC · JPL
809284	2019 CL_{14}	—	February 4, 2019	Haleakala	Pan-STARRS 2	·	1.8 km	MPC · JPL
809285	2019 CH_{15}	—	February 4, 2019	Haleakala	Pan-STARRS 1	·	2.1 km	MPC · JPL
809286	2019 CE_{16}	—	February 4, 2019	Haleakala	Pan-STARRS 1	·	2.4 km	MPC · JPL
809287	2019 CG_{16}	—	February 8, 2019	Mount Lemmon	Mount Lemmon Survey	·	2.2 km	MPC · JPL
809288	2019 CN_{16}	—	January 26, 2019	Mount Lemmon	Mount Lemmon Survey	ELF	2.4 km	MPC · JPL
809289	2019 CT_{16}	—	February 5, 2019	Haleakala	Pan-STARRS 1	·	2.2 km	MPC · JPL
809290	2019 CG_{18}	—	February 5, 2019	Haleakala	Pan-STARRS 1	·	2.3 km	MPC · JPL
809291	2019 CO_{18}	—	February 4, 2019	Haleakala	Pan-STARRS 1	·	2.1 km	MPC · JPL
809292	2019 CX_{18}	—	February 5, 2019	Haleakala	Pan-STARRS 1	·	2.5 km	MPC · JPL
809293	2019 CD_{19}	—	August 13, 2010	Kitt Peak	Spacewatch	·	2.2 km	MPC · JPL
809294	2019 CJ_{19}	—	February 11, 2019	Mount Lemmon	Mount Lemmon Survey	·	2.0 km	MPC · JPL
809295	2019 CK_{19}	—	April 30, 2014	Haleakala	Pan-STARRS 1	·	1.9 km	MPC · JPL
809296	2019 CM_{19}	—	February 5, 2019	Haleakala	Pan-STARRS 1	·	2.5 km	MPC · JPL
809297	2019 CE_{20}	—	February 5, 2019	Haleakala	Pan-STARRS 1	EOS	1.4 km	MPC · JPL
809298	2019 CS_{20}	—	February 4, 2019	Haleakala	Pan-STARRS 1	·	2.2 km	MPC · JPL
809299	2019 CX_{22}	—	February 5, 2019	Haleakala	Pan-STARRS 1	TIR	1.8 km	MPC · JPL
809300	2019 CA_{24}	—	February 4, 2019	Haleakala	Pan-STARRS 1	EOS	1.2 km	MPC · JPL

== 809301–809400 ==
back to top

Designation			Discovery			Properties		Ref
Permanent	Provisional	Named after	Date	Site	Discoverer(s)	Category	Diam.	Ref
809301	2019 DO_{2}	—	February 28, 2019	Mount Lemmon	Mount Lemmon Survey	T_{j} (2.99)	2.6 km	MPC · JPL
809302	2019 DL_{3}	—	May 5, 2014	Cerro Tololo-DECam	DECam	·	2.4 km	MPC · JPL
809303	2019 DX_{3}	—	February 28, 2019	Mount Lemmon	Mount Lemmon Survey	·	1.0 km	MPC · JPL
809304	2019 DN_{4}	—	February 28, 2019	Mount Lemmon	Mount Lemmon Survey	·	2.7 km	MPC · JPL
809305	2019 DL_{5}	—	February 26, 2019	Mount Lemmon	Mount Lemmon Survey	·	1.8 km	MPC · JPL
809306	2019 EW_{5}	—	April 23, 2014	Cerro Tololo	DECam	·	1.8 km	MPC · JPL
809307	2019 EA_{6}	—	September 3, 2010	Mount Lemmon	Mount Lemmon Survey	·	2.5 km	MPC · JPL
809308	2019 FE_{3}	—	January 20, 2008	Mount Lemmon	Mount Lemmon Survey	T_{j} (2.92)	2.7 km	MPC · JPL
809309	2019 FZ_{8}	—	April 4, 2008	Mount Lemmon	Mount Lemmon Survey	·	2.3 km	MPC · JPL
809310	2019 FK_{9}	—	March 18, 2019	Mount Lemmon	Mount Lemmon Survey	·	2.1 km	MPC · JPL
809311	2019 FG_{10}	—	March 29, 2019	Mount Lemmon	Mount Lemmon Survey	T_{j} (2.99) · EUP	2.3 km	MPC · JPL
809312	2019 FO_{15}	—	March 17, 2019	Mount Lemmon	Mount Lemmon Survey	·	560 m	MPC · JPL
809313	2019 FT_{15}	—	March 29, 2019	Mount Lemmon	Mount Lemmon Survey	·	2.2 km	MPC · JPL
809314	2019 FU_{15}	—	March 31, 2019	Mount Lemmon	Mount Lemmon Survey	·	1.2 km	MPC · JPL
809315	2019 FE_{17}	—	March 29, 2019	Mount Lemmon	Mount Lemmon Survey	·	1.9 km	MPC · JPL
809316	2019 FW_{17}	—	March 19, 2013	Palomar Mountain	Palomar Transient Factory	·	2.4 km	MPC · JPL
809317	2019 FE_{18}	—	March 29, 2019	Mount Lemmon	Mount Lemmon Survey	·	2.0 km	MPC · JPL
809318	2019 FO_{18}	—	May 23, 2015	Cerro Tololo	DECam	·	1.2 km	MPC · JPL
809319	2019 FK_{19}	—	March 31, 2019	Mount Lemmon	Mount Lemmon Survey	·	940 m	MPC · JPL
809320	2019 FA_{20}	—	March 31, 2019	Mount Lemmon	Mount Lemmon Survey	·	2.1 km	MPC · JPL
809321	2019 FC_{22}	—	March 29, 2019	Mount Lemmon	Mount Lemmon Survey	·	2.6 km	MPC · JPL
809322	2019 FD_{23}	—	March 29, 2019	Mount Lemmon	Mount Lemmon Survey	URS	2.3 km	MPC · JPL
809323	2019 FF_{23}	—	March 31, 2019	Mount Lemmon	Mount Lemmon Survey	·	2.2 km	MPC · JPL
809324	2019 FU_{23}	—	March 31, 2019	Mount Lemmon	Mount Lemmon Survey	·	2.4 km	MPC · JPL
809325	2019 FV_{24}	—	March 29, 2019	Mount Lemmon	Mount Lemmon Survey	·	1.8 km	MPC · JPL
809326	2019 FV_{25}	—	March 29, 2019	Mount Lemmon	Mount Lemmon Survey	T_{j} (2.92)	2.7 km	MPC · JPL
809327	2019 FW_{26}	—	March 31, 2019	Mount Lemmon	Mount Lemmon Survey	·	1.7 km	MPC · JPL
809328	2019 FB_{27}	—	March 29, 2019	Mount Lemmon	Mount Lemmon Survey	·	1.4 km	MPC · JPL
809329	2019 FJ_{28}	—	March 29, 2019	Mount Lemmon	Mount Lemmon Survey	·	2.4 km	MPC · JPL
809330	2019 FF_{30}	—	April 28, 2014	Cerro Tololo	DECam	·	2.0 km	MPC · JPL
809331	2019 FF_{32}	—	March 29, 2019	Mount Lemmon	Mount Lemmon Survey	(895)	2.3 km	MPC · JPL
809332	2019 FM_{33}	—	March 31, 2019	Cerro Paranal	Gaia Ground Based Optical Tracking	·	1.4 km	MPC · JPL
809333	2019 FW_{36}	—	March 29, 2019	Mount Lemmon	Mount Lemmon Survey	·	1.9 km	MPC · JPL
809334	2019 GA_{13}	—	April 3, 2019	Haleakala	Pan-STARRS 1	L5	5.7 km	MPC · JPL
809335	2019 GA_{15}	—	February 25, 2007	Kitt Peak	Spacewatch	·	2.2 km	MPC · JPL
809336	2019 GY_{38}	—	October 21, 2016	Mount Lemmon	Mount Lemmon Survey	·	2.6 km	MPC · JPL
809337	2019 GC_{41}	—	April 4, 2019	Mount Lemmon	Mount Lemmon Survey	T_{j} (2.99)	2.3 km	MPC · JPL
809338	2019 GM_{41}	—	April 2, 2019	Haleakala	Pan-STARRS 1	·	2.3 km	MPC · JPL
809339	2019 GJ_{42}	—	April 5, 2019	Haleakala	Pan-STARRS 1	·	2.5 km	MPC · JPL
809340	2019 GP_{43}	—	April 3, 2019	Haleakala	Pan-STARRS 1	·	2.4 km	MPC · JPL
809341	2019 GX_{43}	—	April 5, 2019	Haleakala	Pan-STARRS 1	·	2.6 km	MPC · JPL
809342	2019 GA_{48}	—	April 7, 2019	Haleakala	Pan-STARRS 1	·	2.0 km	MPC · JPL
809343	2019 GO_{48}	—	February 10, 2007	Mount Lemmon	Mount Lemmon Survey	HYG	1.9 km	MPC · JPL
809344	2019 GC_{49}	—	April 2, 2019	Haleakala	Pan-STARRS 1	·	2.1 km	MPC · JPL
809345	2019 GE_{52}	—	April 3, 2019	Haleakala	Pan-STARRS 1	·	1.3 km	MPC · JPL
809346	2019 GS_{52}	—	April 3, 2019	Haleakala	Pan-STARRS 1	HYG	2.1 km	MPC · JPL
809347	2019 GV_{52}	—	May 21, 2015	Cerro Tololo	DECam	·	1.1 km	MPC · JPL
809348	2019 GB_{53}	—	April 7, 2019	Haleakala	Pan-STARRS 1	·	1.2 km	MPC · JPL
809349	2019 GO_{53}	—	April 6, 2019	Haleakala	Pan-STARRS 1	·	2.2 km	MPC · JPL
809350	2019 GX_{53}	—	April 2, 2019	Haleakala	Pan-STARRS 1	·	740 m	MPC · JPL
809351	2019 GV_{55}	—	April 6, 2019	Haleakala	Pan-STARRS 1	·	2.4 km	MPC · JPL
809352	2019 GC_{56}	—	April 5, 2019	Haleakala	Pan-STARRS 1	·	740 m	MPC · JPL
809353	2019 GJ_{56}	—	April 3, 2019	Haleakala	Pan-STARRS 1	·	2.2 km	MPC · JPL
809354	2019 GM_{58}	—	April 2, 2019	Haleakala	Pan-STARRS 1	·	1.3 km	MPC · JPL
809355	2019 GQ_{58}	—	April 7, 2019	Haleakala	Pan-STARRS 1	L5	6.4 km	MPC · JPL
809356	2019 GD_{59}	—	April 3, 2019	Haleakala	Pan-STARRS 1	VER	1.7 km	MPC · JPL
809357	2019 GF_{59}	—	April 3, 2019	Haleakala	Pan-STARRS 1	·	2.1 km	MPC · JPL
809358	2019 GV_{59}	—	April 3, 2019	Haleakala	Pan-STARRS 1	·	2.3 km	MPC · JPL
809359	2019 GW_{59}	—	April 2, 2019	Haleakala	Pan-STARRS 1	L5	5.4 km	MPC · JPL
809360	2019 GF_{60}	—	May 7, 2014	Haleakala	Pan-STARRS 1	·	1.5 km	MPC · JPL
809361	2019 GT_{63}	—	May 14, 2015	Cerro Paranal	Gaia Ground Based Optical Tracking	(29841)	930 m	MPC · JPL
809362	2019 GY_{64}	—	April 13, 2019	Mount Lemmon	Mount Lemmon Survey	·	2.3 km	MPC · JPL
809363	2019 GP_{66}	—	April 9, 2019	Haleakala	Pan-STARRS 1	·	1.2 km	MPC · JPL
809364	2019 GQ_{67}	—	May 20, 2015	Cerro Tololo	DECam	·	1.2 km	MPC · JPL
809365	2019 GV_{68}	—	April 2, 2019	Haleakala	Pan-STARRS 1	L5	5.6 km	MPC · JPL
809366	2019 GE_{75}	—	April 6, 2019	Haleakala	Pan-STARRS 1	L5	6.2 km	MPC · JPL
809367	2019 GJ_{80}	—	April 8, 2019	Haleakala	Pan-STARRS 1	·	930 m	MPC · JPL
809368	2019 GU_{82}	—	April 5, 2019	Haleakala	Pan-STARRS 1	VER	2.0 km	MPC · JPL
809369	2019 GD_{83}	—	April 6, 2019	Haleakala	Pan-STARRS 1	·	2.0 km	MPC · JPL
809370	2019 GZ_{83}	—	April 3, 2019	Haleakala	Pan-STARRS 1	·	1 km	MPC · JPL
809371	2019 GF_{85}	—	April 2, 2019	Haleakala	Pan-STARRS 1	·	1.3 km	MPC · JPL
809372	2019 GU_{86}	—	April 3, 2019	Haleakala	Pan-STARRS 1	·	1.7 km	MPC · JPL
809373	2019 GP_{98}	—	April 2, 2019	Cerro Tololo	DECam	·	1.6 km	MPC · JPL
809374	2019 GW_{98}	—	February 3, 2013	Haleakala	Pan-STARRS 1	·	1.7 km	MPC · JPL
809375	2019 GL_{100}	—	April 3, 2019	Haleakala	Pan-STARRS 1	·	2.2 km	MPC · JPL
809376	2019 GG_{101}	—	April 5, 2019	Haleakala	Pan-STARRS 1	THB	2.3 km	MPC · JPL
809377	2019 GV_{104}	—	April 8, 2019	Haleakala	Pan-STARRS 1	·	1.8 km	MPC · JPL
809378	2019 GQ_{110}	—	April 8, 2019	Haleakala	Pan-STARRS 1	·	2.2 km	MPC · JPL
809379	2019 GP_{112}	—	April 3, 2019	Haleakala	Pan-STARRS 1	·	1.9 km	MPC · JPL
809380	2019 GJ_{113}	—	April 5, 2019	Haleakala	Pan-STARRS 1	·	1.0 km	MPC · JPL
809381	2019 GK_{114}	—	April 2, 2019	Haleakala	Pan-STARRS 1	·	2.2 km	MPC · JPL
809382	2019 GQ_{114}	—	April 4, 2019	Haleakala	Pan-STARRS 1	·	2.0 km	MPC · JPL
809383	2019 GQ_{117}	—	March 20, 1999	Sacramento Peak	SDSS	·	1.5 km	MPC · JPL
809384	2019 GT_{117}	—	September 9, 2015	Haleakala	Pan-STARRS 1	·	2.2 km	MPC · JPL
809385	2019 GD_{118}	—	October 25, 2016	Haleakala	Pan-STARRS 1	VER	1.7 km	MPC · JPL
809386	2019 GH_{120}	—	April 28, 2014	Cerro Tololo	DECam	·	1.7 km	MPC · JPL
809387	2019 GL_{122}	—	April 5, 2019	Haleakala	Pan-STARRS 1	·	2.2 km	MPC · JPL
809388	2019 GA_{124}	—	April 2, 2019	Haleakala	Pan-STARRS 1	T_{j} (2.77)	3.9 km	MPC · JPL
809389	2019 GS_{124}	—	April 3, 2019	Haleakala	Pan-STARRS 1	·	2.1 km	MPC · JPL
809390	2019 GC_{125}	—	May 21, 2015	Haleakala	Pan-STARRS 1	·	1.0 km	MPC · JPL
809391	2019 GG_{126}	—	April 5, 2019	Haleakala	Pan-STARRS 1	EUN	810 m	MPC · JPL
809392	2019 GP_{126}	—	April 3, 2019	Mount Lemmon	Mount Lemmon Survey	·	2.7 km	MPC · JPL
809393	2019 GR_{126}	—	April 4, 2019	Haleakala	Pan-STARRS 1	ELF	2.2 km	MPC · JPL
809394	2019 GV_{127}	—	May 20, 2015	Cerro Tololo	DECam	·	1.2 km	MPC · JPL
809395	2019 GW_{127}	—	April 7, 2019	Haleakala	Pan-STARRS 1	·	1.3 km	MPC · JPL
809396	2019 GO_{128}	—	April 7, 2019	Haleakala	Pan-STARRS 1	·	1.2 km	MPC · JPL
809397	2019 GU_{129}	—	April 3, 2019	Haleakala	Pan-STARRS 1	·	2.2 km	MPC · JPL
809398	2019 GG_{132}	—	April 7, 2019	Haleakala	Pan-STARRS 1	·	2.0 km	MPC · JPL
809399	2019 GD_{133}	—	April 3, 2019	Haleakala	Pan-STARRS 1	·	2.2 km	MPC · JPL
809400	2019 GU_{151}	—	April 5, 2019	Haleakala	Pan-STARRS 1	·	2.4 km	MPC · JPL

== 809401–809500 ==
back to top

Designation			Discovery			Properties		Ref
Permanent	Provisional	Named after	Date	Site	Discoverer(s)	Category	Diam.	Ref
809401	2019 GD_{153}	—	April 6, 2019	Haleakala	Pan-STARRS 1	·	1.9 km	MPC · JPL
809402	2019 GE_{156}	—	April 3, 2019	Haleakala	Pan-STARRS 1	·	1.1 km	MPC · JPL
809403	2019 GU_{157}	—	April 3, 2019	Haleakala	Pan-STARRS 1	VER	1.9 km	MPC · JPL
809404	2019 GB_{160}	—	April 3, 2019	Haleakala	Pan-STARRS 1	·	860 m	MPC · JPL
809405	2019 GW_{174}	—	March 16, 2015	Mount Lemmon	Mount Lemmon Survey	·	700 m	MPC · JPL
809406	2019 GE_{176}	—	May 25, 2003	Kitt Peak	Spacewatch	·	850 m	MPC · JPL
809407	2019 GA_{177}	—	April 2, 2019	Haleakala	Pan-STARRS 1	(895)	2.0 km	MPC · JPL
809408	2019 GG_{187}	—	April 3, 2019	Haleakala	Pan-STARRS 1	·	1.9 km	MPC · JPL
809409	2019 GB_{196}	—	May 21, 2015	Haleakala	Pan-STARRS 1	·	870 m	MPC · JPL
809410	2019 GQ_{197}	—	April 3, 2019	Haleakala	Pan-STARRS 1	L5	5.1 km	MPC · JPL
809411	2019 HB_{1}	—	March 8, 2011	Catalina	CSS	H	500 m	MPC · JPL
809412	2019 HZ_{7}	—	September 10, 2015	Haleakala	Pan-STARRS 1	THM	1.4 km	MPC · JPL
809413	2019 HP_{8}	—	April 26, 2019	Mount Lemmon	Mount Lemmon Survey	·	1.1 km	MPC · JPL
809414	2019 HV_{8}	—	April 26, 2019	Mount Lemmon	Mount Lemmon Survey	·	420 m	MPC · JPL
809415	2019 HC_{9}	—	April 26, 2019	Mount Lemmon	Mount Lemmon Survey	·	1.1 km	MPC · JPL
809416	2019 HR_{11}	—	April 24, 2019	Haleakala	Pan-STARRS 1	·	2.2 km	MPC · JPL
809417	2019 HK_{12}	—	April 26, 2019	Mount Lemmon	Mount Lemmon Survey	·	2.2 km	MPC · JPL
809418	2019 HV_{13}	—	April 24, 2019	Haleakala	Pan-STARRS 1	(260)	2.1 km	MPC · JPL
809419	2019 HQ_{14}	—	May 18, 2015	Mount Lemmon	Mount Lemmon Survey	·	1.1 km	MPC · JPL
809420	2019 JL_{8}	—	May 10, 2014	Haleakala	Pan-STARRS 1	T_{j} (2.98)	2.2 km	MPC · JPL
809421	2019 JC_{14}	—	April 2, 2019	Haleakala	Pan-STARRS 1	·	500 m	MPC · JPL
809422	2019 JP_{14}	—	July 24, 2015	Haleakala	Pan-STARRS 1	·	1.3 km	MPC · JPL
809423	2019 JE_{25}	—	March 13, 2010	Mount Lemmon	Mount Lemmon Survey	·	950 m	MPC · JPL
809424	2019 JO_{30}	—	March 13, 2013	Haleakala	Pan-STARRS 1	HYG	2.1 km	MPC · JPL
809425	2019 JA_{35}	—	May 8, 2019	Haleakala	Pan-STARRS 1	·	990 m	MPC · JPL
809426	2019 JN_{39}	—	September 12, 2015	Haleakala	Pan-STARRS 1	URS	2.0 km	MPC · JPL
809427	2019 JS_{40}	—	December 2, 2010	Mount Lemmon	Mount Lemmon Survey	EUP	2.4 km	MPC · JPL
809428	2019 JH_{48}	—	May 3, 1998	Kitt Peak	Spacewatch	·	1.1 km	MPC · JPL
809429	2019 JM_{48}	—	May 1, 2019	Haleakala	Pan-STARRS 1	·	2.7 km	MPC · JPL
809430	2019 JX_{54}	—	April 24, 2014	Mount Lemmon	Mount Lemmon Survey	·	1.1 km	MPC · JPL
809431	2019 JE_{63}	—	May 9, 2019	Haleakala	Pan-STARRS 1	·	1.1 km	MPC · JPL
809432	2019 JF_{63}	—	May 1, 2019	Haleakala	Pan-STARRS 1	·	1.3 km	MPC · JPL
809433	2019 JH_{64}	—	May 8, 2019	Haleakala	Pan-STARRS 1	·	1.1 km	MPC · JPL
809434	2019 JO_{66}	—	May 1, 2019	Haleakala	Pan-STARRS 1	·	2.7 km	MPC · JPL
809435	2019 JC_{67}	—	May 2, 2019	Haleakala	Pan-STARRS 1	·	3.4 km	MPC · JPL
809436	2019 JH_{76}	—	May 7, 2019	Haleakala	Pan-STARRS 1	AGN	830 m	MPC · JPL
809437	2019 JY_{76}	—	April 23, 2014	Cerro Tololo	DECam	·	1.3 km	MPC · JPL
809438	2019 JQ_{81}	—	May 1, 2019	Haleakala	Pan-STARRS 1	·	870 m	MPC · JPL
809439	2019 JU_{81}	—	May 2, 2019	Haleakala	Pan-STARRS 1	·	1.2 km	MPC · JPL
809440	2019 JZ_{82}	—	May 1, 2019	Haleakala	Pan-STARRS 1	·	890 m	MPC · JPL
809441	2019 JL_{85}	—	May 1, 2019	Haleakala	Pan-STARRS 1	·	1.2 km	MPC · JPL
809442	2019 JF_{87}	—	May 8, 2019	Haleakala	Pan-STARRS 1	EOS	1.4 km	MPC · JPL
809443	2019 JN_{100}	—	February 12, 2018	Haleakala	Pan-STARRS 1	·	1.8 km	MPC · JPL
809444	2019 JP_{100}	—	May 1, 2019	Haleakala	Pan-STARRS 1	HOF	1.7 km	MPC · JPL
809445	2019 JB_{104}	—	May 11, 2019	Haleakala	Pan-STARRS 1	·	1.3 km	MPC · JPL
809446	2019 JF_{104}	—	May 14, 2019	Mount Lemmon	Mount Lemmon Survey	·	1.2 km	MPC · JPL
809447	2019 JP_{107}	—	December 29, 2017	Haleakala	Pan-STARRS 1	·	2.6 km	MPC · JPL
809448	2019 JT_{107}	—	May 7, 2019	Haleakala	Pan-STARRS 1	EOS	1.1 km	MPC · JPL
809449	2019 JB_{108}	—	May 9, 2019	Haleakala	Pan-STARRS 1	·	1.2 km	MPC · JPL
809450	2019 JO_{109}	—	May 7, 2019	Haleakala	Pan-STARRS 1	EOS	1.3 km	MPC · JPL
809451	2019 JR_{109}	—	May 20, 2015	Cerro Tololo	DECam	(5)	840 m	MPC · JPL
809452	2019 JT_{112}	—	May 1, 2019	Haleakala	Pan-STARRS 1	·	1.2 km	MPC · JPL
809453	2019 JQ_{113}	—	November 18, 2007	Kitt Peak	Spacewatch	HOF	1.8 km	MPC · JPL
809454	2019 JA_{124}	—	May 7, 2019	Haleakala	Pan-STARRS 1	·	1.8 km	MPC · JPL
809455	2019 JH_{126}	—	May 7, 2019	Haleakala	Pan-STARRS 1	EUN	790 m	MPC · JPL
809456	2019 JL_{131}	—	May 8, 2019	Haleakala	Pan-STARRS 1	·	2.3 km	MPC · JPL
809457	2019 JA_{136}	—	March 17, 2012	Mount Lemmon	Mount Lemmon Survey	·	2.4 km	MPC · JPL
809458	2019 JG_{142}	—	May 8, 2019	Haleakala	Pan-STARRS 1	·	2.3 km	MPC · JPL
809459	2019 KH_{6}	—	April 9, 2016	Haleakala	Pan-STARRS 1	L4	7.9 km	MPC · JPL
809460	2019 KB_{20}	—	May 27, 2019	Haleakala	Pan-STARRS 1	KOR	1 km	MPC · JPL
809461	2019 KU_{22}	—	May 29, 2019	Haleakala	Pan-STARRS 1	·	1.3 km	MPC · JPL
809462	2019 KP_{27}	—	May 25, 2019	Haleakala	Pan-STARRS 1	HOF	2.0 km	MPC · JPL
809463	2019 KP_{28}	—	May 29, 2019	Haleakala	Pan-STARRS 2	·	1.6 km	MPC · JPL
809464	2019 KD_{31}	—	October 10, 2007	Mount Lemmon	Mount Lemmon Survey	·	1.3 km	MPC · JPL
809465	2019 KZ_{34}	—	May 29, 2019	Haleakala	Pan-STARRS 2	·	990 m	MPC · JPL
809466	2019 KL_{47}	—	February 21, 2018	Haleakala	Pan-STARRS 1	EOS	1.4 km	MPC · JPL
809467	2019 KT_{47}	—	May 25, 2019	Haleakala	Pan-STARRS 1	·	1.3 km	MPC · JPL
809468	2019 KU_{47}	—	May 25, 2019	Haleakala	Pan-STARRS 1	MAR	690 m	MPC · JPL
809469	2019 KA_{48}	—	November 7, 2008	Mount Lemmon	Mount Lemmon Survey	HNS	790 m	MPC · JPL
809470	2019 KR_{49}	—	July 4, 2014	Haleakala	Pan-STARRS 1	·	2.7 km	MPC · JPL
809471	2019 KB_{52}	—	May 29, 2019	Haleakala	Pan-STARRS 1	·	1.5 km	MPC · JPL
809472	2019 KJ_{54}	—	March 15, 2010	Mount Lemmon	Mount Lemmon Survey	ADE	1.4 km	MPC · JPL
809473	2019 LJ_{15}	—	June 9, 2019	Haleakala	Pan-STARRS 1	·	1.3 km	MPC · JPL
809474	2019 LM_{17}	—	June 2, 2019	Haleakala	Pan-STARRS 1	·	2.6 km	MPC · JPL
809475	2019 LS_{17}	—	June 1, 2019	Haleakala	Pan-STARRS 1	SYL	2.6 km	MPC · JPL
809476	2019 LU_{17}	—	June 2, 2019	Haleakala	Pan-STARRS 1	·	1.7 km	MPC · JPL
809477	2019 LF_{18}	—	June 2, 2019	Haleakala	Pan-STARRS 1	·	1.2 km	MPC · JPL
809478	2019 LS_{21}	—	June 7, 2019	Palomar Mountain	Zwicky Transient Facility	MAR	740 m	MPC · JPL
809479	2019 LW_{24}	—	June 9, 2019	Haleakala	Pan-STARRS 1	·	2.5 km	MPC · JPL
809480	2019 LW_{27}	—	June 15, 2019	Haleakala	Pan-STARRS 1	·	1.5 km	MPC · JPL
809481	2019 LE_{28}	—	June 8, 2019	Haleakala	Pan-STARRS 1	·	770 m	MPC · JPL
809482	2019 LA_{30}	—	February 28, 2014	Haleakala	Pan-STARRS 1	·	1.3 km	MPC · JPL
809483	2019 LE_{34}	—	June 1, 2019	Haleakala	Pan-STARRS 1	·	2.0 km	MPC · JPL
809484	2019 MM	—	May 12, 2019	Haleakala	Pan-STARRS 1	·	1.1 km	MPC · JPL
809485	2019 MT_{11}	—	June 30, 2019	Haleakala	Pan-STARRS 1	KOR	920 m	MPC · JPL
809486	2019 MU_{11}	—	June 28, 2019	Haleakala	Pan-STARRS 1	·	2.1 km	MPC · JPL
809487	2019 MZ_{11}	—	June 28, 2019	Haleakala	Pan-STARRS 1	EOS	1.3 km	MPC · JPL
809488	2019 MK_{27}	—	November 25, 2016	Mount Lemmon	Mount Lemmon Survey	·	1.3 km	MPC · JPL
809489	2019 MV_{29}	—	June 28, 2019	Haleakala	Pan-STARRS 1	·	1.3 km	MPC · JPL
809490	2019 NK_{9}	—	March 24, 2015	Haleakala	Pan-STARRS 1	L4	5.4 km	MPC · JPL
809491	2019 NP_{9}	—	April 18, 2015	Cerro Tololo	DECam	L4	5.5 km	MPC · JPL
809492	2019 ND_{37}	—	July 10, 2019	Haleakala	Pan-STARRS 1	AGN	810 m	MPC · JPL
809493	2019 NK_{37}	—	July 1, 2019	Haleakala	Pan-STARRS 1	·	1.2 km	MPC · JPL
809494	2019 NF_{38}	—	July 4, 2019	Haleakala	Pan-STARRS 1	·	1.1 km	MPC · JPL
809495	2019 NA_{39}	—	July 2, 2019	Haleakala	Pan-STARRS 1	·	1.9 km	MPC · JPL
809496	2019 NU_{39}	—	July 4, 2019	Haleakala	Pan-STARRS 1	KOR	990 m	MPC · JPL
809497	2019 NH_{41}	—	July 1, 2019	Haleakala	Pan-STARRS 1	V	550 m	MPC · JPL
809498	2019 NZ_{47}	—	July 4, 2019	Mount Lemmon	Mount Lemmon Survey	·	2.2 km	MPC · JPL
809499	2019 NB_{48}	—	July 6, 2019	Haleakala	Pan-STARRS 1	L4	6.0 km	MPC · JPL
809500	2019 NX_{48}	—	July 1, 2019	Haleakala	Pan-STARRS 1	L4	6.4 km	MPC · JPL

== 809501–809600 ==
back to top

Designation			Discovery			Properties		Ref
Permanent	Provisional	Named after	Date	Site	Discoverer(s)	Category	Diam.	Ref
809501	2019 NB_{54}	—	July 1, 2019	Haleakala	Pan-STARRS 1	·	1.4 km	MPC · JPL
809502	2019 NA_{59}	—	July 1, 2019	Haleakala	Pan-STARRS 1	L4	7.4 km	MPC · JPL
809503	2019 NM_{60}	—	July 1, 2019	Haleakala	Pan-STARRS 1	·	1.3 km	MPC · JPL
809504	2019 NP_{61}	—	July 3, 2019	Haleakala	Pan-STARRS 1	·	1.5 km	MPC · JPL
809505	2019 NX_{65}	—	July 1, 2019	Haleakala	Pan-STARRS 1	NEM	1.5 km	MPC · JPL
809506	2019 NK_{72}	—	July 4, 2019	Haleakala	Pan-STARRS 1	L4 · ERY	5.7 km	MPC · JPL
809507	2019 ND_{73}	—	July 5, 2019	Haleakala	Pan-STARRS 2	·	1.2 km	MPC · JPL
809508	2019 NM_{74}	—	April 18, 2015	Cerro Tololo	DECam	L4	5.7 km	MPC · JPL
809509	2019 NW_{77}	—	July 1, 2019	Haleakala	Pan-STARRS 1	·	1.1 km	MPC · JPL
809510	2019 NQ_{78}	—	December 23, 2012	Haleakala	Pan-STARRS 1	L4	5.8 km	MPC · JPL
809511	2019 NN_{79}	—	July 1, 2019	Haleakala	Pan-STARRS 1	·	750 m	MPC · JPL
809512	2019 NR_{79}	—	July 10, 2019	Haleakala	Pan-STARRS 1	L4	6.4 km	MPC · JPL
809513	2019 NV_{81}	—	July 1, 2019	Haleakala	Pan-STARRS 1	VER	2.1 km	MPC · JPL
809514	2019 NO_{83}	—	March 5, 2013	Mount Lemmon	Mount Lemmon Survey	·	1.4 km	MPC · JPL
809515	2019 NP_{83}	—	July 1, 2019	Haleakala	Pan-STARRS 1	·	730 m	MPC · JPL
809516	2019 NF_{115}	—	July 2, 2019	Haleakala	Pan-STARRS 1	·	1.5 km	MPC · JPL
809517	2019 NK_{120}	—	July 1, 2019	Haleakala	Pan-STARRS 1	L4	5.3 km	MPC · JPL
809518	2019 OR_{9}	—	September 3, 2008	Kitt Peak	Spacewatch	NYS	800 m	MPC · JPL
809519	2019 OR_{20}	—	September 11, 2002	Palomar Mountain	NEAT	·	2.8 km	MPC · JPL
809520	2019 OH_{27}	—	July 28, 2019	Haleakala	Pan-STARRS 2	L4 · ERY	5.9 km	MPC · JPL
809521	2019 ON_{28}	—	July 26, 2019	Haleakala	Pan-STARRS 1	·	2.2 km	MPC · JPL
809522	2019 OD_{29}	—	April 18, 2015	Cerro Tololo	DECam	L4	5.6 km	MPC · JPL
809523	2019 OD_{32}	—	August 19, 2020	Haleakala	Pan-STARRS 1	L4	6.0 km	MPC · JPL
809524	2019 OQ_{33}	—	July 26, 2019	Haleakala	Pan-STARRS 1	EOS	1.2 km	MPC · JPL
809525	2019 OV_{36}	—	July 25, 2019	Haleakala	Pan-STARRS 1	·	1.1 km	MPC · JPL
809526	2019 OB_{41}	—	April 5, 2014	Haleakala	Pan-STARRS 1	·	1.3 km	MPC · JPL
809527	2019 OT_{44}	—	July 25, 2019	Haleakala	Pan-STARRS 1	KOR	940 m	MPC · JPL
809528	2019 OJ_{50}	—	July 25, 2019	Haleakala	Pan-STARRS 1	·	1.6 km	MPC · JPL
809529	2019 ON_{50}	—	August 31, 2011	Piszkés-tető	K. Sárneczky, S. Kürti	MAR	720 m	MPC · JPL
809530	2019 OV_{53}	—	January 28, 2011	Mount Lemmon	Mount Lemmon Survey	EOS	1.5 km	MPC · JPL
809531	2019 OM_{59}	—	July 26, 2019	Haleakala	Pan-STARRS 1	·	1.4 km	MPC · JPL
809532	2019 PH_{19}	—	August 5, 2019	Haleakala	Pan-STARRS 1	EUN	850 m	MPC · JPL
809533	2019 PS_{19}	—	August 11, 2019	Haleakala	Pan-STARRS 1	KON	1.7 km	MPC · JPL
809534	2019 PZ_{19}	—	August 1, 2019	Palomar Mountain	Zwicky Transient Facility	·	1.1 km	MPC · JPL
809535	2019 PY_{32}	—	August 5, 2019	Haleakala	Pan-STARRS 1	HOF	1.8 km	MPC · JPL
809536	2019 PN_{33}	—	August 7, 2019	Haleakala	Pan-STARRS 2	·	2.0 km	MPC · JPL
809537	2019 PP_{33}	—	August 8, 2019	Haleakala	Pan-STARRS 1	·	740 m	MPC · JPL
809538	2019 PR_{33}	—	August 8, 2019	Haleakala	Pan-STARRS 2	·	1.9 km	MPC · JPL
809539	2019 PA_{34}	—	August 8, 2019	Haleakala	Pan-STARRS 1	EOS	1.5 km	MPC · JPL
809540	2019 PJ_{34}	—	August 5, 2019	Haleakala	Pan-STARRS 1	L4	6.1 km	MPC · JPL
809541	2019 PT_{41}	—	August 5, 2019	Haleakala	Pan-STARRS 1	L4	5.6 km	MPC · JPL
809542	2019 PH_{45}	—	August 8, 2019	Haleakala	Pan-STARRS 1	L4	6.4 km	MPC · JPL
809543	2019 PB_{46}	—	August 4, 2019	Haleakala	Pan-STARRS 1	·	2.5 km	MPC · JPL
809544	2019 PD_{51}	—	August 4, 2019	Haleakala	Pan-STARRS 1	·	1.4 km	MPC · JPL
809545	2019 PN_{56}	—	August 5, 2019	Haleakala	Pan-STARRS 1	·	2.8 km	MPC · JPL
809546	2019 PV_{63}	—	August 8, 2019	Haleakala	Pan-STARRS 2	·	1.5 km	MPC · JPL
809547	2019 PL_{64}	—	August 8, 2019	Haleakala	Pan-STARRS 1	EOS	1.3 km	MPC · JPL
809548	2019 PK_{65}	—	August 4, 2019	Haleakala	Pan-STARRS 1	L4	6.0 km	MPC · JPL
809549	2019 PN_{65}	—	August 5, 2019	Haleakala	Pan-STARRS 1	L4	5.7 km	MPC · JPL
809550	2019 PQ_{67}	—	November 20, 2014	Haleakala	Pan-STARRS 1	·	2.0 km	MPC · JPL
809551	2019 PC_{68}	—	August 9, 2019	Haleakala	Pan-STARRS 2	·	1.2 km	MPC · JPL
809552	2019 PM_{68}	—	August 8, 2019	Haleakala	Pan-STARRS 2	L4	5.9 km	MPC · JPL
809553	2019 PQ_{71}	—	August 9, 2019	Haleakala	Pan-STARRS 2	EOS	1.4 km	MPC · JPL
809554	2019 PZ_{78}	—	August 5, 2019	Haleakala	Pan-STARRS 1	·	1.4 km	MPC · JPL
809555	2019 PC_{79}	—	August 8, 2019	Haleakala	Pan-STARRS 1	·	2.3 km	MPC · JPL
809556	2019 PG_{79}	—	August 9, 2019	Haleakala	Pan-STARRS 1	·	1.3 km	MPC · JPL
809557	2019 PN_{83}	—	August 8, 2019	Haleakala	Pan-STARRS 1	·	1.4 km	MPC · JPL
809558	2019 PP_{83}	—	August 4, 2019	Haleakala	Pan-STARRS 1	·	2.2 km	MPC · JPL
809559	2019 PL_{85}	—	August 8, 2019	Haleakala	Pan-STARRS 1	·	810 m	MPC · JPL
809560	2019 PA_{89}	—	February 24, 2017	Haleakala	Pan-STARRS 1	·	2.0 km	MPC · JPL
809561	2019 QE_{6}	—	August 28, 2019	Mount Lemmon	Mount Lemmon Survey	APO	200 m	MPC · JPL
809562	2019 QP_{10}	—	October 20, 2003	Kitt Peak	Spacewatch	·	580 m	MPC · JPL
809563	2019 QN_{12}	—	August 27, 2019	Mount Lemmon	Mount Lemmon Survey	·	1.4 km	MPC · JPL
809564	2019 QM_{30}	—	August 31, 2019	Haleakala	Pan-STARRS 1	·	1.5 km	MPC · JPL
809565	2019 QG_{31}	—	August 21, 2019	Haleakala	Pan-STARRS 1	·	870 m	MPC · JPL
809566	2019 QN_{34}	—	August 31, 2019	Haleakala	Pan-STARRS 1	·	1.2 km	MPC · JPL
809567	2019 QH_{37}	—	January 6, 2010	Mount Lemmon	Mount Lemmon Survey	·	820 m	MPC · JPL
809568	2019 QP_{54}	—	August 31, 2019	Haleakala	Pan-STARRS 1	EOS	1.4 km	MPC · JPL
809569	2019 QQ_{68}	—	August 31, 2019	Haleakala	Pan-STARRS 1	·	1.1 km	MPC · JPL
809570	2019 QK_{72}	—	August 25, 2019	Haleakala	Pan-STARRS 2	EOS	1.3 km	MPC · JPL
809571	2019 QA_{74}	—	August 23, 2019	Haleakala	Pan-STARRS 2	KON	1.5 km	MPC · JPL
809572	2019 QR_{77}	—	August 28, 2019	Cerro Tololo-DECam	DECam	·	1.3 km	MPC · JPL
809573	2019 QZ_{77}	—	January 16, 2013	Haleakala	Pan-STARRS 1	L4 · ERY	4.9 km	MPC · JPL
809574	2019 QL_{79}	—	May 6, 2014	Haleakala	Pan-STARRS 1	·	1.1 km	MPC · JPL
809575	2019 QF_{82}	—	August 28, 2019	Haleakala	Pan-STARRS 1	·	1.3 km	MPC · JPL
809576	2019 QG_{93}	—	August 24, 2019	Haleakala	Pan-STARRS 2	·	1.2 km	MPC · JPL
809577	2019 QY_{96}	—	January 10, 2013	Haleakala	Pan-STARRS 1	L4	6.0 km	MPC · JPL
809578	2019 QF_{109}	—	August 28, 2019	Cerro Tololo-DECam	DECam	·	700 m	MPC · JPL
809579	2019 RJ_{3}	—	September 1, 2006	Siding Spring	SSS	·	1.3 km	MPC · JPL
809580	2019 RY_{5}	—	January 21, 2012	Haleakala	Pan-STARRS 1	·	1.2 km	MPC · JPL
809581	2019 RR_{8}	—	September 6, 2019	Haleakala	Pan-STARRS 1	EUN	850 m	MPC · JPL
809582	2019 RW_{9}	—	September 4, 2019	Mount Lemmon	Mount Lemmon Survey	·	1.8 km	MPC · JPL
809583	2019 RT_{15}	—	September 24, 2012	Kitt Peak	Spacewatch	·	840 m	MPC · JPL
809584	2019 RQ_{28}	—	September 6, 2019	Haleakala	Pan-STARRS 1	KOR	910 m	MPC · JPL
809585	2019 RS_{28}	—	September 4, 2019	Mount Lemmon	Mount Lemmon Survey	·	2.2 km	MPC · JPL
809586	2019 RO_{30}	—	September 1, 2019	Mount Lemmon	Mount Lemmon Survey	·	830 m	MPC · JPL
809587	2019 RB_{34}	—	September 5, 2019	Mount Lemmon	Mount Lemmon Survey	VER	2.0 km	MPC · JPL
809588	2019 RL_{36}	—	September 4, 2019	Mount Lemmon	Mount Lemmon Survey	·	2.2 km	MPC · JPL
809589	2019 RW_{38}	—	September 6, 2019	Haleakala	Pan-STARRS 1	·	1.1 km	MPC · JPL
809590	2019 RQ_{48}	—	September 1, 2019	Cerro Tololo-DECam	DECam	NYS	850 m	MPC · JPL
809591	2019 RH_{49}	—	September 3, 2019	Mount Lemmon	Mount Lemmon Survey	·	720 m	MPC · JPL
809592	2019 RX_{54}	—	September 5, 2019	Mount Lemmon	Mount Lemmon Survey	·	1.0 km	MPC · JPL
809593	2019 RO_{55}	—	June 2, 2019	Haleakala	Pan-STARRS 1	·	1.9 km	MPC · JPL
809594	2019 RH_{58}	—	September 6, 2019	Haleakala	Pan-STARRS 1	·	2.1 km	MPC · JPL
809595	2019 RC_{59}	—	September 6, 2019	Haleakala	Pan-STARRS 1	·	850 m	MPC · JPL
809596	2019 RQ_{65}	—	February 21, 2017	Haleakala	Pan-STARRS 1	·	1.9 km	MPC · JPL
809597	2019 RH_{68}	—	September 5, 2019	Mount Lemmon	Mount Lemmon Survey	·	1.1 km	MPC · JPL
809598	2019 RC_{72}	—	September 7, 2019	Mount Lemmon	Mount Lemmon Survey	L4 · ERY	5.4 km	MPC · JPL
809599	2019 RP_{72}	—	September 5, 2019	Mount Lemmon	Mount Lemmon Survey	·	2.4 km	MPC · JPL
809600	2019 RL_{74}	—	September 4, 2019	Mount Lemmon	Mount Lemmon Survey	VER	1.8 km	MPC · JPL

== 809601–809700 ==
back to top

Designation			Discovery			Properties		Ref
Permanent	Provisional	Named after	Date	Site	Discoverer(s)	Category	Diam.	Ref
809601	2019 RS_{76}	—	September 5, 2019	Mount Lemmon	Mount Lemmon Survey	HNS	600 m	MPC · JPL
809602	2019 RR_{85}	—	October 26, 2014	Mount Lemmon	Mount Lemmon Survey	·	1.4 km	MPC · JPL
809603	2019 RY_{92}	—	September 6, 2019	Haleakala	Pan-STARRS 1	L4	6.3 km	MPC · JPL
809604	2019 SF_{12}	—	July 10, 2019	Mount Lemmon	Mount Lemmon Survey	PHO	770 m	MPC · JPL
809605	2019 SH_{12}	—	October 25, 2008	Mount Lemmon	Mount Lemmon Survey	·	1.1 km	MPC · JPL
809606	2019 SL_{12}	—	September 26, 2019	Haleakala	Pan-STARRS 1	·	1.4 km	MPC · JPL
809607	2019 SL_{15}	—	October 27, 2005	Anderson Mesa	LONEOS	·	770 m	MPC · JPL
809608	2019 SQ_{15}	—	September 24, 2019	Haleakala	Pan-STARRS 1	(1547)	880 m	MPC · JPL
809609	2019 SY_{15}	—	November 20, 2015	Mount Lemmon	Mount Lemmon Survey	·	790 m	MPC · JPL
809610	2019 SM_{20}	—	September 26, 2019	Haleakala	Pan-STARRS 1	·	980 m	MPC · JPL
809611	2019 SO_{26}	—	August 17, 2009	Catalina	CSS	·	620 m	MPC · JPL
809612	2019 SQ_{31}	—	September 30, 2019	Mount Lemmon	Mount Lemmon Survey	·	520 m	MPC · JPL
809613	2019 SF_{40}	—	September 27, 2019	Haleakala	Pan-STARRS 1	MAR	570 m	MPC · JPL
809614	2019 SN_{41}	—	July 29, 2005	Palomar Mountain	NEAT	·	700 m	MPC · JPL
809615	2019 SG_{44}	—	September 15, 2007	Kitt Peak	Spacewatch	·	2.3 km	MPC · JPL
809616	2019 SS_{48}	—	September 26, 2019	Haleakala	Pan-STARRS 1	·	1.4 km	MPC · JPL
809617	2019 SP_{56}	—	September 14, 2006	Kitt Peak	Spacewatch	·	1.0 km	MPC · JPL
809618	2019 SC_{58}	—	September 1, 2013	Mount Lemmon	Mount Lemmon Survey	THM	1.7 km	MPC · JPL
809619	2019 SG_{61}	—	September 27, 2019	Haleakala	Pan-STARRS 1	·	1.2 km	MPC · JPL
809620	2019 SO_{62}	—	August 12, 2013	Haleakala	Pan-STARRS 1	VER	1.9 km	MPC · JPL
809621	2019 SD_{68}	—	August 29, 2014	Kitt Peak	Spacewatch	·	1.4 km	MPC · JPL
809622	2019 SK_{70}	—	September 24, 2019	Haleakala	Pan-STARRS 1	·	1.9 km	MPC · JPL
809623	2019 SH_{82}	—	September 30, 2019	Mount Lemmon	Mount Lemmon Survey	·	1.9 km	MPC · JPL
809624	2019 SM_{82}	—	September 25, 2019	Haleakala	Pan-STARRS 1	·	980 m	MPC · JPL
809625	2019 SO_{82}	—	September 27, 2019	Haleakala	Pan-STARRS 1	·	2.1 km	MPC · JPL
809626	2019 ST_{82}	—	September 30, 2019	Mount Lemmon	Mount Lemmon Survey	·	960 m	MPC · JPL
809627	2019 SY_{82}	—	September 22, 2019	Mount Lemmon	Mount Lemmon Survey	·	2.4 km	MPC · JPL
809628	2019 SA_{84}	—	September 24, 2019	Haleakala	Pan-STARRS 1	·	2.1 km	MPC · JPL
809629	2019 SF_{84}	—	September 29, 2019	Haleakala	Pan-STARRS 1	ADE	1.4 km	MPC · JPL
809630	2019 SE_{85}	—	September 24, 2019	Haleakala	Pan-STARRS 1	·	1.9 km	MPC · JPL
809631	2019 SM_{85}	—	September 25, 2019	Haleakala	Pan-STARRS 1	·	1.9 km	MPC · JPL
809632	2019 SS_{85}	—	September 20, 2019	Mount Lemmon	Mount Lemmon Survey	·	1.2 km	MPC · JPL
809633	2019 ST_{85}	—	September 26, 2019	Haleakala	Pan-STARRS 1	·	1.2 km	MPC · JPL
809634	2019 SX_{85}	—	September 27, 2019	Haleakala	Pan-STARRS 1	·	1.3 km	MPC · JPL
809635	2019 SA_{86}	—	September 25, 2019	Haleakala	Pan-STARRS 1	EOS	1.3 km	MPC · JPL
809636	2019 SJ_{86}	—	September 24, 2019	Haleakala	Pan-STARRS 1	·	2.5 km	MPC · JPL
809637	2019 SG_{87}	—	September 24, 2019	Haleakala	Pan-STARRS 1	·	840 m	MPC · JPL
809638	2019 SD_{92}	—	September 26, 2019	Haleakala	Pan-STARRS 1	THM	1.4 km	MPC · JPL
809639	2019 SG_{92}	—	September 27, 2019	Haleakala	Pan-STARRS 1	·	2.5 km	MPC · JPL
809640	2019 SR_{92}	—	November 1, 2015	Mount Lemmon	Mount Lemmon Survey	·	830 m	MPC · JPL
809641	2019 SB_{103}	—	August 20, 2014	Haleakala	Pan-STARRS 1	·	1.1 km	MPC · JPL
809642	2019 SA_{107}	—	May 20, 2015	Cerro Tololo	DECam	L4	5.3 km	MPC · JPL
809643	2019 SO_{108}	—	December 14, 2015	Haleakala	Pan-STARRS 1	·	880 m	MPC · JPL
809644	2019 SQ_{108}	—	September 30, 2019	Haleakala	Pan-STARRS 1	·	1.0 km	MPC · JPL
809645	2019 SR_{108}	—	September 29, 2019	Haleakala	Pan-STARRS 1	EOS	1.2 km	MPC · JPL
809646	2019 SX_{116}	—	December 30, 2015	Haleakala	Pan-STARRS 1	·	1.1 km	MPC · JPL
809647	2019 SN_{120}	—	September 30, 2019	Mount Lemmon	Mount Lemmon Survey	·	840 m	MPC · JPL
809648	2019 SX_{135}	—	September 30, 2019	Haleakala	Pan-STARRS 1	JUN	960 m	MPC · JPL
809649	2019 SL_{144}	—	September 29, 2019	Mount Lemmon	Mount Lemmon Survey	·	2.0 km	MPC · JPL
809650	2019 SJ_{150}	—	September 25, 2019	Haleakala	Pan-STARRS 1	·	860 m	MPC · JPL
809651	2019 SK_{166}	—	September 25, 2019	Haleakala	Pan-STARRS 1	·	2.0 km	MPC · JPL
809652	2019 SM_{179}	—	September 29, 2019	Haleakala	Pan-STARRS 1	·	2.3 km	MPC · JPL
809653	2019 SE_{184}	—	October 23, 2011	Haleakala	Pan-STARRS 1	·	860 m	MPC · JPL
809654	2019 SR_{184}	—	September 24, 2019	Haleakala	Pan-STARRS 1	·	1.1 km	MPC · JPL
809655	2019 SG_{187}	—	September 26, 2019	Haleakala	Pan-STARRS 1	L4	5.7 km	MPC · JPL
809656	2019 ST_{187}	—	September 29, 2019	Cerro Tololo-DECam	DECam	·	2.1 km	MPC · JPL
809657	2019 SG_{194}	—	October 10, 2015	Haleakala	Pan-STARRS 1	·	1.0 km	MPC · JPL
809658	2019 SA_{196}	—	September 27, 2019	Haleakala	Pan-STARRS 1	BRG	1.1 km	MPC · JPL
809659	2019 SF_{196}	—	September 27, 2019	Haleakala	Pan-STARRS 1	·	1.0 km	MPC · JPL
809660	2019 SM_{198}	—	November 20, 2014	Haleakala	Pan-STARRS 1	·	1.7 km	MPC · JPL
809661	2019 SW_{198}	—	September 24, 2019	Haleakala	Pan-STARRS 1	·	1.0 km	MPC · JPL
809662	2019 SQ_{204}	—	September 24, 2019	Haleakala	Pan-STARRS 1	·	1.3 km	MPC · JPL
809663	2019 SL_{205}	—	September 9, 2015	Haleakala	Pan-STARRS 1	·	890 m	MPC · JPL
809664	2019 SC_{221}	—	September 30, 2019	Mount Lemmon	Mount Lemmon Survey	·	1.2 km	MPC · JPL
809665	2019 SJ_{231}	—	September 29, 2019	Mount Lemmon	Mount Lemmon Survey	·	680 m	MPC · JPL
809666	2019 SS_{235}	—	September 27, 2019	Haleakala	Pan-STARRS 1	AST	1.0 km	MPC · JPL
809667	2019 SW_{267}	—	September 20, 2019	Mount Lemmon	Mount Lemmon Survey	·	1.3 km	MPC · JPL
809668	2019 SK_{271}	—	September 25, 2019	Haleakala	Pan-STARRS 1	·	1.3 km	MPC · JPL
809669	2019 SU_{272}	—	March 11, 2008	Mount Lemmon	Mount Lemmon Survey	·	1.1 km	MPC · JPL
809670	2019 TT_{10}	—	December 8, 2015	Mount Lemmon	Mount Lemmon Survey	EUN	890 m	MPC · JPL
809671	2019 TD_{12}	—	December 4, 2015	Haleakala	Pan-STARRS 1	·	980 m	MPC · JPL
809672	2019 TY_{12}	—	December 8, 1996	Kitt Peak	Spacewatch	·	2.4 km	MPC · JPL
809673	2019 TE_{15}	—	October 8, 2019	Mount Lemmon	Mount Lemmon Survey	EUN	810 m	MPC · JPL
809674	2019 TC_{18}	—	October 8, 2019	Mount Lemmon	Mount Lemmon Survey	EUN	800 m	MPC · JPL
809675	2019 TH_{18}	—	October 8, 2019	Mount Lemmon	Mount Lemmon Survey	EUN	730 m	MPC · JPL
809676	2019 TX_{19}	—	October 8, 2019	Mount Lemmon	Mount Lemmon Survey	·	1.2 km	MPC · JPL
809677	2019 TG_{22}	—	October 8, 2019	Mount Lemmon	Mount Lemmon Survey	HNS	800 m	MPC · JPL
809678	2019 TZ_{22}	—	May 19, 2010	WISE	WISE	EUN	800 m	MPC · JPL
809679	2019 TG_{35}	—	October 3, 2019	Mount Lemmon	Mount Lemmon Survey	·	2.3 km	MPC · JPL
809680	2019 TQ_{35}	—	October 3, 2019	Mount Lemmon	Mount Lemmon Survey	·	2.3 km	MPC · JPL
809681	2019 TR_{35}	—	October 11, 2019	Mount Lemmon	Mount Lemmon Survey	·	2.1 km	MPC · JPL
809682	2019 TE_{36}	—	October 8, 2019	Mount Lemmon	Mount Lemmon Survey	(5)	860 m	MPC · JPL
809683	2019 TA_{38}	—	October 7, 2019	Haleakala	Pan-STARRS 1	·	2.5 km	MPC · JPL
809684	2019 TA_{39}	—	October 7, 2019	Haleakala	Pan-STARRS 1	EOS	1.2 km	MPC · JPL
809685	2019 TH_{40}	—	October 5, 2019	Haleakala	Pan-STARRS 2	·	690 m	MPC · JPL
809686	2019 TD_{45}	—	October 7, 2019	Mount Lemmon	Mount Lemmon Survey	PHO	1.1 km	MPC · JPL
809687	2019 TK_{46}	—	January 11, 2016	Haleakala	Pan-STARRS 1	·	930 m	MPC · JPL
809688	2019 TM_{48}	—	November 30, 2011	Mount Lemmon	Mount Lemmon Survey	MAR	630 m	MPC · JPL
809689	2019 TT_{48}	—	April 13, 2018	Haleakala	Pan-STARRS 1	·	1.8 km	MPC · JPL
809690	2019 TQ_{52}	—	October 5, 2019	Haleakala	Pan-STARRS 1	L4	6.4 km	MPC · JPL
809691	2019 TX_{52}	—	October 5, 2019	Haleakala	Pan-STARRS 1	EOS	1.2 km	MPC · JPL
809692	2019 TK_{56}	—	October 8, 2019	Haleakala	Pan-STARRS 1	MAR	680 m	MPC · JPL
809693	2019 TD_{58}	—	October 9, 2019	Haleakala	Pan-STARRS 1	MAR	750 m	MPC · JPL
809694	2019 TE_{76}	—	October 7, 2019	Haleakala	Pan-STARRS 1	·	1.0 km	MPC · JPL
809695	2019 TF_{76}	—	October 5, 2019	Haleakala	Pan-STARRS 1	MAR	680 m	MPC · JPL
809696	2019 TE_{83}	—	October 5, 2019	Haleakala	Pan-STARRS 1	·	980 m	MPC · JPL
809697	2019 TW_{84}	—	October 3, 2019	Mount Lemmon	Mount Lemmon Survey	EOS	1.5 km	MPC · JPL
809698	2019 TH_{88}	—	March 19, 2017	Haleakala	Pan-STARRS 1	·	1.3 km	MPC · JPL
809699	2019 UH_{4}	—	June 7, 2019	Haleakala	Pan-STARRS 1	AMO	470 m	MPC · JPL
809700	2019 UF_{10}	—	August 8, 2019	Haleakala	Pan-STARRS 1	·	420 m	MPC · JPL

== 809701–809800 ==
back to top

Designation			Discovery			Properties		Ref
Permanent	Provisional	Named after	Date	Site	Discoverer(s)	Category	Diam.	Ref
809701	2019 UF_{15}	—	October 27, 2019	Mount Lemmon	Mount Lemmon Survey	·	1.9 km	MPC · JPL
809702	2019 UM_{19}	—	July 27, 2014	Haleakala	Pan-STARRS 1	EUN	760 m	MPC · JPL
809703	2019 UX_{20}	—	September 11, 2007	Mount Lemmon	Mount Lemmon Survey	THM	1.7 km	MPC · JPL
809704	2019 UQ_{28}	—	October 23, 2019	Haleakala	Pan-STARRS 1	HNS	770 m	MPC · JPL
809705	2019 UF_{30}	—	February 27, 2012	Haleakala	Pan-STARRS 1	·	880 m	MPC · JPL
809706	2019 UQ_{31}	—	October 22, 2019	Mount Lemmon	Mount Lemmon Survey	·	1.1 km	MPC · JPL
809707	2019 UR_{34}	—	October 23, 2019	Mount Lemmon	Mount Lemmon Survey	(5)	750 m	MPC · JPL
809708	2019 UY_{34}	—	October 25, 2019	Haleakala	Pan-STARRS 1	·	2.3 km	MPC · JPL
809709	2019 UQ_{35}	—	October 25, 2019	Mount Lemmon	Mount Lemmon Survey	·	940 m	MPC · JPL
809710	2019 UT_{35}	—	October 24, 2019	Mount Lemmon	Mount Lemmon Survey	·	1.9 km	MPC · JPL
809711	2019 UV_{36}	—	May 16, 2010	WISE	WISE	·	2.1 km	MPC · JPL
809712	2019 UZ_{36}	—	October 25, 2019	Haleakala	Pan-STARRS 2	·	1.3 km	MPC · JPL
809713	2019 UX_{37}	—	February 11, 2008	Mauna Kea	P. A. Wiegert	·	1.2 km	MPC · JPL
809714	2019 UV_{39}	—	October 8, 2015	Haleakala	Pan-STARRS 1	·	960 m	MPC · JPL
809715	2019 UP_{43}	—	June 1, 2012	Mount Lemmon	Mount Lemmon Survey	·	1.9 km	MPC · JPL
809716	2019 UT_{48}	—	October 31, 2019	Haleakala	Pan-STARRS 1	KON	1.7 km	MPC · JPL
809717	2019 UZ_{53}	—	October 26, 2019	Haleakala	Pan-STARRS 1	·	860 m	MPC · JPL
809718	2019 UO_{54}	—	November 18, 2014	Mount Lemmon	Mount Lemmon Survey	·	1.3 km	MPC · JPL
809719	2019 UY_{61}	—	December 29, 2014	Mount Lemmon	Mount Lemmon Survey	·	1.8 km	MPC · JPL
809720	2019 UA_{79}	—	October 28, 2019	Haleakala	Pan-STARRS 1	HNS	680 m	MPC · JPL
809721	2019 UG_{81}	—	October 23, 2019	Mount Lemmon	Mount Lemmon Survey	·	1.3 km	MPC · JPL
809722	2019 UF_{91}	—	October 23, 2019	Mount Lemmon	Mount Lemmon Survey	·	1.2 km	MPC · JPL
809723	2019 UR_{103}	—	October 28, 2019	Haleakala	Pan-STARRS 1	·	1.0 km	MPC · JPL
809724	2019 UW_{103}	—	October 23, 2019	Haleakala	Pan-STARRS 2	·	1.9 km	MPC · JPL
809725	2019 UY_{103}	—	January 15, 2015	Mount Lemmon	Mount Lemmon Survey	·	2.0 km	MPC · JPL
809726	2019 UC_{104}	—	October 24, 2019	Haleakala	Pan-STARRS 1	·	2.0 km	MPC · JPL
809727	2019 UX_{104}	—	November 21, 2008	Mount Lemmon	Mount Lemmon Survey	·	1.9 km	MPC · JPL
809728	2019 UM_{105}	—	October 28, 2019	Haleakala	Pan-STARRS 1	MAR	650 m	MPC · JPL
809729	2019 UK_{107}	—	October 31, 2019	Haleakala	Pan-STARRS 1	·	1.0 km	MPC · JPL
809730	2019 UO_{109}	—	October 23, 2019	Haleakala	Pan-STARRS 2	GAL	1.1 km	MPC · JPL
809731	2019 UZ_{111}	—	March 18, 2017	Haleakala	Pan-STARRS 1	·	1.3 km	MPC · JPL
809732	2019 UU_{115}	—	October 25, 2019	Haleakala	Pan-STARRS 1	·	870 m	MPC · JPL
809733	2019 UB_{116}	—	October 27, 2019	Haleakala	Pan-STARRS 1	·	1.2 km	MPC · JPL
809734	2019 UJ_{116}	—	October 27, 2019	Haleakala	Pan-STARRS 2	·	700 m	MPC · JPL
809735	2019 UQ_{116}	—	October 27, 2019	Haleakala	Pan-STARRS 2	·	800 m	MPC · JPL
809736	2019 UW_{116}	—	October 23, 2019	Haleakala	Pan-STARRS 1	·	690 m	MPC · JPL
809737	2019 UL_{119}	—	January 4, 2012	Kitt Peak	Spacewatch	·	870 m	MPC · JPL
809738	2019 UO_{122}	—	December 6, 2007	Mount Lemmon	Mount Lemmon Survey	·	1.4 km	MPC · JPL
809739	2019 UH_{123}	—	October 24, 2019	Haleakala	Pan-STARRS 1	·	840 m	MPC · JPL
809740	2019 UL_{124}	—	September 19, 2014	Haleakala	Pan-STARRS 1	PAD	1.1 km	MPC · JPL
809741	2019 UP_{125}	—	October 31, 2019	Mount Lemmon	Mount Lemmon Survey	·	870 m	MPC · JPL
809742	2019 UA_{126}	—	January 16, 2015	Haleakala	Pan-STARRS 1	·	2.7 km	MPC · JPL
809743	2019 UQ_{126}	—	October 22, 2019	Mount Lemmon	Mount Lemmon Survey	·	840 m	MPC · JPL
809744	2019 UQ_{128}	—	October 31, 2019	Haleakala	Pan-STARRS 2	·	1.3 km	MPC · JPL
809745	2019 UL_{143}	—	October 24, 2019	Haleakala	Pan-STARRS 1	·	2.0 km	MPC · JPL
809746	2019 UV_{144}	—	October 25, 2019	Mount Lemmon	Mount Lemmon Survey	·	1.8 km	MPC · JPL
809747	2019 UC_{166}	—	October 21, 2019	Mount Lemmon	Mount Lemmon Survey	·	1.0 km	MPC · JPL
809748	2019 UL_{166}	—	October 28, 2019	Haleakala	Pan-STARRS 1	·	660 m	MPC · JPL
809749	2019 UG_{181}	—	October 31, 2019	Haleakala	Pan-STARRS 2	·	1.7 km	MPC · JPL
809750	2019 UK_{184}	—	September 19, 2014	Haleakala	Pan-STARRS 1	·	1.1 km	MPC · JPL
809751	2019 UU_{190}	—	November 27, 2014	Haleakala	Pan-STARRS 1	·	1.9 km	MPC · JPL
809752	2019 UV_{194}	—	October 31, 2019	Haleakala	Pan-STARRS 1	·	1.7 km	MPC · JPL
809753	2019 UH_{195}	—	February 9, 2016	Haleakala	Pan-STARRS 1	·	2.0 km	MPC · JPL
809754	2019 UY_{199}	—	October 25, 2015	Haleakala	Pan-STARRS 1	·	930 m	MPC · JPL
809755	2019 UL_{200}	—	October 28, 2019	Haleakala	Pan-STARRS 1	·	1.5 km	MPC · JPL
809756	2019 VA_{5}	—	January 18, 2016	Mount Lemmon	Mount Lemmon Survey	·	1.1 km	MPC · JPL
809757	2019 VN_{6}	—	January 31, 2017	Mount Lemmon	Mount Lemmon Survey	APO +1km	840 m	MPC · JPL
809758	2019 VD_{7}	—	March 11, 2016	Kitt Peak	Spacewatch	·	2.3 km	MPC · JPL
809759	2019 VA_{8}	—	November 2, 2019	Haleakala	Pan-STARRS 1	·	2.3 km	MPC · JPL
809760	2019 VA_{9}	—	May 1, 2016	Cerro Tololo	DECam	LIX	2.1 km	MPC · JPL
809761	2019 VH_{9}	—	November 5, 2019	Mount Lemmon	Mount Lemmon Survey	·	1.3 km	MPC · JPL
809762	2019 VA_{10}	—	November 2, 2019	Haleakala	Pan-STARRS 1	·	1.8 km	MPC · JPL
809763	2019 VQ_{10}	—	November 2, 2019	Haleakala	Pan-STARRS 1	·	730 m	MPC · JPL
809764	2019 VR_{11}	—	November 3, 2019	Haleakala	Pan-STARRS 1	HNS	910 m	MPC · JPL
809765	2019 VF_{13}	—	April 26, 2017	Haleakala	Pan-STARRS 1	BAR	950 m	MPC · JPL
809766	2019 VG_{13}	—	November 8, 2019	Mount Lemmon	Mount Lemmon Survey	EUN	810 m	MPC · JPL
809767	2019 VV_{13}	—	January 27, 2012	Kitt Peak	Spacewatch	·	1.0 km	MPC · JPL
809768	2019 VL_{14}	—	November 5, 2019	Mount Lemmon	Mount Lemmon Survey	·	870 m	MPC · JPL
809769	2019 VQ_{19}	—	November 2, 2019	Haleakala	Pan-STARRS 1	·	2.2 km	MPC · JPL
809770	2019 VJ_{22}	—	November 5, 2019	Mount Lemmon	Mount Lemmon Survey	·	900 m	MPC · JPL
809771	2019 VN_{22}	—	November 5, 2019	Mount Lemmon	Mount Lemmon Survey	·	960 m	MPC · JPL
809772	2019 VM_{23}	—	November 5, 2019	Haleakala	Pan-STARRS 2	WAT	910 m	MPC · JPL
809773	2019 VO_{29}	—	November 2, 2019	Haleakala	Pan-STARRS 1	·	830 m	MPC · JPL
809774	2019 VP_{29}	—	November 3, 2019	Haleakala	Pan-STARRS 1	HNS	640 m	MPC · JPL
809775	2019 VH_{30}	—	November 5, 2019	Mount Lemmon	Mount Lemmon Survey	·	870 m	MPC · JPL
809776	2019 VN_{30}	—	August 13, 2018	Haleakala	Pan-STARRS 1	·	2.0 km	MPC · JPL
809777	2019 VW_{30}	—	November 5, 2019	Mount Lemmon	Mount Lemmon Survey	·	910 m	MPC · JPL
809778	2019 VK_{31}	—	November 8, 2019	Mount Lemmon	Mount Lemmon Survey	·	790 m	MPC · JPL
809779	2019 VM_{33}	—	November 2, 2019	Haleakala	Pan-STARRS 1	EUN	690 m	MPC · JPL
809780	2019 VR_{33}	—	November 2, 2019	Haleakala	Pan-STARRS 1	RAF	610 m	MPC · JPL
809781	2019 VX_{60}	—	November 2, 2019	Haleakala	Pan-STARRS 1	·	2.1 km	MPC · JPL
809782	2019 VY_{62}	—	November 29, 2014	Mount Lemmon	Mount Lemmon Survey	·	1.8 km	MPC · JPL
809783	2019 VG_{63}	—	December 21, 2014	Haleakala	Pan-STARRS 1	·	1.4 km	MPC · JPL
809784	2019 WJ_{7}	—	November 28, 2019	Haleakala	Pan-STARRS 1	H	380 m	MPC · JPL
809785	2019 WS_{7}	—	November 24, 2019	Mount Lemmon	Mount Lemmon Survey	EUN	810 m	MPC · JPL
809786	2019 WB_{9}	—	November 26, 2019	Haleakala	Pan-STARRS 1	EUN	920 m	MPC · JPL
809787	2019 WU_{9}	—	November 27, 2019	Haleakala	Pan-STARRS 1	·	1.7 km	MPC · JPL
809788	2019 WR_{10}	—	December 6, 2015	Mount Lemmon	Mount Lemmon Survey	·	1.0 km	MPC · JPL
809789	2019 WD_{15}	—	November 24, 2019	Mount Lemmon	Mount Lemmon Survey	·	730 m	MPC · JPL
809790	2019 WM_{15}	—	November 26, 2019	Haleakala	Pan-STARRS 1	·	950 m	MPC · JPL
809791	2019 WH_{16}	—	November 26, 2019	Haleakala	Pan-STARRS 1	·	2.1 km	MPC · JPL
809792	2019 WJ_{16}	—	November 26, 2019	Haleakala	Pan-STARRS 1	EUN	790 m	MPC · JPL
809793	2019 WE_{18}	—	November 19, 2019	Mount Lemmon	Mount Lemmon Survey	·	780 m	MPC · JPL
809794	2019 WP_{18}	—	November 28, 2019	Haleakala	Pan-STARRS 2	·	2.0 km	MPC · JPL
809795	2019 WR_{19}	—	November 19, 2019	Mount Lemmon	Mount Lemmon Survey	JUN	710 m	MPC · JPL
809796	2019 WX_{19}	—	November 26, 2019	Haleakala	Pan-STARRS 1	EUN	750 m	MPC · JPL
809797	2019 WJ_{21}	—	November 26, 2019	Haleakala	Pan-STARRS 1	·	1.1 km	MPC · JPL
809798	2019 WN_{21}	—	November 28, 2019	Haleakala	Pan-STARRS 2	·	1.6 km	MPC · JPL
809799	2019 WV_{21}	—	November 26, 2019	Haleakala	Pan-STARRS 1	·	1.1 km	MPC · JPL
809800	2019 WT_{27}	—	September 29, 2019	Haleakala	Pan-STARRS 1	·	660 m	MPC · JPL

== 809801–809900 ==
back to top

Designation			Discovery			Properties		Ref
Permanent	Provisional	Named after	Date	Site	Discoverer(s)	Category	Diam.	Ref
809801	2019 WQ_{41}	—	January 20, 2015	Haleakala	Pan-STARRS 1	·	2.2 km	MPC · JPL
809802	2019 XV_{2}	—	December 4, 2019	Haleakala	Pan-STARRS 1	·	1.2 km	MPC · JPL
809803	2019 XB_{6}	—	December 3, 2019	Haleakala	Pan-STARRS 1	HNS	690 m	MPC · JPL
809804	2019 XD_{11}	—	December 3, 2019	Haleakala	Pan-STARRS 1	HNS	810 m	MPC · JPL
809805	2019 XZ_{11}	—	May 3, 2016	Cerro Tololo	DECam	·	1.4 km	MPC · JPL
809806	2019 XQ_{12}	—	December 2, 2019	Mount Lemmon	Mount Lemmon Survey	EUN	680 m	MPC · JPL
809807	2019 XW_{12}	—	December 3, 2019	Haleakala	Pan-STARRS 1	·	1.1 km	MPC · JPL
809808	2019 XL_{13}	—	December 6, 2019	Mount Lemmon	Mount Lemmon Survey	·	740 m	MPC · JPL
809809	2019 XT_{14}	—	February 5, 2016	Haleakala	Pan-STARRS 1	·	1.3 km	MPC · JPL
809810	2019 XP_{16}	—	December 3, 2019	Haleakala	Pan-STARRS 1	·	2.2 km	MPC · JPL
809811	2019 XH_{17}	—	March 24, 2022	Mount Lemmon	Mount Lemmon Survey	·	1.3 km	MPC · JPL
809812	2019 XS_{17}	—	December 6, 2019	Mount Lemmon	Mount Lemmon Survey	·	910 m	MPC · JPL
809813	2019 XS_{18}	—	December 2, 2019	Mount Lemmon	Mount Lemmon Survey	MAR	740 m	MPC · JPL
809814	2019 XC_{19}	—	December 7, 2019	Mount Lemmon	Mount Lemmon Survey	·	1.3 km	MPC · JPL
809815	2019 YZ_{6}	—	December 30, 2019	Kitt Peak	Bok NEO Survey	·	1.0 km	MPC · JPL
809816	2019 YW_{7}	—	May 1, 2016	Cerro Tololo	DECam	·	1.4 km	MPC · JPL
809817	2019 YA_{8}	—	December 28, 2019	Haleakala	Pan-STARRS 1	·	2.0 km	MPC · JPL
809818	2019 YT_{8}	—	April 3, 2016	Haleakala	Pan-STARRS 1	·	1.2 km	MPC · JPL
809819	2019 YS_{9}	—	December 28, 2019	Haleakala	Pan-STARRS 1	·	1.1 km	MPC · JPL
809820	2019 YB_{10}	—	April 3, 2016	Haleakala	Pan-STARRS 1	·	1.4 km	MPC · JPL
809821	2019 YZ_{10}	—	April 26, 2016	Mount Lemmon	Mount Lemmon Survey	·	1.2 km	MPC · JPL
809822	2019 YF_{11}	—	December 24, 2019	Haleakala	Pan-STARRS 1	·	1.3 km	MPC · JPL
809823	2019 YJ_{11}	—	December 19, 2019	Haleakala	Pan-STARRS 2	·	960 m	MPC · JPL
809824	2019 YB_{12}	—	April 24, 2011	Catalina	CSS	·	1.4 km	MPC · JPL
809825	2019 YW_{12}	—	December 24, 2019	Haleakala	Pan-STARRS 1	·	1.1 km	MPC · JPL
809826	2019 YG_{16}	—	December 28, 2019	Haleakala	Pan-STARRS 1	·	1.3 km	MPC · JPL
809827	2019 YZ_{19}	—	December 30, 2019	Haleakala	Pan-STARRS 1	·	910 m	MPC · JPL
809828	2019 YS_{20}	—	January 14, 2016	Haleakala	Pan-STARRS 1	·	1.4 km	MPC · JPL
809829	2019 YV_{20}	—	April 3, 2016	Haleakala	Pan-STARRS 1	·	1.4 km	MPC · JPL
809830	2019 YR_{22}	—	December 28, 2019	Haleakala	Pan-STARRS 1	·	1.7 km	MPC · JPL
809831	2019 YS_{22}	—	December 28, 2019	Haleakala	Pan-STARRS 1	EOS	1.4 km	MPC · JPL
809832	2019 YT_{22}	—	December 28, 2019	Haleakala	Pan-STARRS 1	·	1.0 km	MPC · JPL
809833	2019 YU_{22}	—	December 30, 2019	Kitt Peak	Bok NEO Survey	·	1.3 km	MPC · JPL
809834	2019 YU_{27}	—	October 30, 2019	Mount Lemmon	Mount Lemmon Survey	H	350 m	MPC · JPL
809835	2019 YS_{30}	—	December 28, 2019	Haleakala	Pan-STARRS 1	·	1.3 km	MPC · JPL
809836	2019 YN_{33}	—	December 24, 2019	Haleakala	Pan-STARRS 1	3:2	4.4 km	MPC · JPL
809837	2019 YY_{33}	—	April 12, 2016	Haleakala	Pan-STARRS 1	·	1.7 km	MPC · JPL
809838	2019 YA_{36}	—	December 30, 2019	Haleakala	Pan-STARRS 1	·	1.9 km	MPC · JPL
809839	2019 YX_{36}	—	January 17, 2015	Haleakala	Pan-STARRS 1	·	1.6 km	MPC · JPL
809840	2019 YB_{37}	—	December 20, 2019	Mount Lemmon	Mount Lemmon Survey	HNS	770 m	MPC · JPL
809841	2019 YM_{37}	—	December 28, 2019	Haleakala	Pan-STARRS 1	·	1.2 km	MPC · JPL
809842	2019 YO_{37}	—	December 17, 2019	Mount Lemmon	Mount Lemmon Survey	·	850 m	MPC · JPL
809843	2019 YR_{37}	—	December 20, 2019	Mount Lemmon	Mount Lemmon Survey	·	1.3 km	MPC · JPL
809844	2019 YS_{37}	—	January 24, 2015	Haleakala	Pan-STARRS 1	·	1.3 km	MPC · JPL
809845	2019 YV_{38}	—	December 30, 2019	Haleakala	Pan-STARRS 1	MAR	670 m	MPC · JPL
809846	2019 YA_{39}	—	December 30, 2019	Haleakala	Pan-STARRS 1	HNS	670 m	MPC · JPL
809847	2019 YL_{39}	—	December 30, 2019	Haleakala	Pan-STARRS 1	EOS	1.4 km	MPC · JPL
809848	2019 YH_{41}	—	May 3, 2016	Cerro Tololo	DECam	·	1.5 km	MPC · JPL
809849	2019 YM_{43}	—	December 31, 2019	Haleakala	Pan-STARRS 1	·	880 m	MPC · JPL
809850	2019 YR_{44}	—	December 30, 2019	Haleakala	Pan-STARRS 1	·	1.6 km	MPC · JPL
809851	2019 YR_{45}	—	December 30, 2019	Haleakala	Pan-STARRS 1	·	1.4 km	MPC · JPL
809852	2020 AN_{4}	—	January 5, 2020	Mount Lemmon	Mount Lemmon Survey	·	1.8 km	MPC · JPL
809853	2020 AO_{4}	—	January 5, 2020	Mount Lemmon	Mount Lemmon Survey	H	570 m	MPC · JPL
809854	2020 AP_{4}	—	January 1, 2020	Haleakala	Pan-STARRS 1	·	1.1 km	MPC · JPL
809855	2020 AA_{5}	—	February 10, 2016	Haleakala	Pan-STARRS 1	·	1.3 km	MPC · JPL
809856	2020 AO_{5}	—	January 3, 2020	Mount Lemmon	Mount Lemmon Survey	·	1.1 km	MPC · JPL
809857	2020 AM_{6}	—	January 1, 2020	Haleakala	Pan-STARRS 1	·	2.3 km	MPC · JPL
809858	2020 AO_{6}	—	January 4, 2020	Mount Lemmon	Mount Lemmon Survey	PAD	1.1 km	MPC · JPL
809859	2020 AW_{8}	—	December 10, 2014	Haleakala	Pan-STARRS 1	·	1.4 km	MPC · JPL
809860	2020 AK_{9}	—	November 27, 2014	Haleakala	Pan-STARRS 1	EUN	860 m	MPC · JPL
809861	2020 AN_{9}	—	December 29, 2014	Mount Lemmon	Mount Lemmon Survey	·	1.4 km	MPC · JPL
809862	2020 AD_{11}	—	January 3, 2016	Haleakala	Pan-STARRS 1	·	1.0 km	MPC · JPL
809863	2020 AY_{11}	—	November 20, 2014	Haleakala	Pan-STARRS 1	·	1.4 km	MPC · JPL
809864	2020 AJ_{12}	—	January 4, 2020	Mount Lemmon	Mount Lemmon Survey	·	1.9 km	MPC · JPL
809865	2020 AE_{15}	—	January 4, 2020	Mount Lemmon	Mount Lemmon Survey	·	1.4 km	MPC · JPL
809866	2020 AE_{21}	—	January 1, 2020	Haleakala	Pan-STARRS 1	ELF	2.3 km	MPC · JPL
809867	2020 AZ_{21}	—	January 1, 2020	Haleakala	Pan-STARRS 1	·	1.4 km	MPC · JPL
809868	2020 AL_{22}	—	January 1, 2020	Haleakala	Pan-STARRS 1	·	790 m	MPC · JPL
809869	2020 AE_{23}	—	September 7, 2018	Mount Lemmon	Mount Lemmon Survey	·	2.3 km	MPC · JPL
809870	2020 AV_{23}	—	January 2, 2020	Haleakala	Pan-STARRS 1	·	1.6 km	MPC · JPL
809871	2020 AH_{28}	—	December 11, 2014	Haleakala	Pan-STARRS 1	·	1.6 km	MPC · JPL
809872	2020 AO_{28}	—	January 3, 2020	Mount Lemmon	Mount Lemmon Survey	EUN	650 m	MPC · JPL
809873	2020 AT_{31}	—	January 3, 2020	Mount Lemmon	Mount Lemmon Survey	·	2.1 km	MPC · JPL
809874	2020 BA	—	December 26, 2014	Haleakala	Pan-STARRS 1	H	420 m	MPC · JPL
809875	2020 BX_{12}	—	January 27, 2020	Mauna Loa	ATLAS	APO · PHA · moon	270 m	MPC · JPL
809876	2020 BS_{15}	—	January 31, 2020	Mount Lemmon	Mount Lemmon Survey	T_{j} (2.9)	1.7 km	MPC · JPL
809877	2020 BZ_{15}	—	January 24, 2020	Mount Lemmon	Mount Lemmon Survey	·	1.1 km	MPC · JPL
809878	2020 BD_{17}	—	January 15, 2011	Mount Lemmon	Mount Lemmon Survey	·	1.3 km	MPC · JPL
809879	2020 BZ_{17}	—	January 24, 2020	Mount Lemmon	Mount Lemmon Survey	·	1.3 km	MPC · JPL
809880	2020 BE_{18}	—	January 19, 2020	Haleakala	Pan-STARRS 1	·	960 m	MPC · JPL
809881	2020 BY_{18}	—	January 22, 2020	Haleakala	Pan-STARRS 1	·	2.2 km	MPC · JPL
809882	2020 BZ_{18}	—	January 23, 2020	Haleakala	Pan-STARRS 1	·	1.0 km	MPC · JPL
809883	2020 BS_{19}	—	January 20, 2020	Haleakala	Pan-STARRS 1	·	1.4 km	MPC · JPL
809884	2020 BT_{19}	—	January 23, 2020	Haleakala	Pan-STARRS 2	DOR	1.6 km	MPC · JPL
809885	2020 BW_{19}	—	April 18, 2015	Cerro Tololo	DECam	·	1.9 km	MPC · JPL
809886	2020 BQ_{20}	—	January 21, 2020	Haleakala	Pan-STARRS 1	GEF	790 m	MPC · JPL
809887	2020 BD_{21}	—	January 22, 2020	Haleakala	Pan-STARRS 1	HNS	760 m	MPC · JPL
809888	2020 BM_{22}	—	May 1, 2016	Haleakala	Pan-STARRS 1	·	1.0 km	MPC · JPL
809889	2020 BD_{24}	—	December 24, 2014	Mount Lemmon	Mount Lemmon Survey	·	1.2 km	MPC · JPL
809890	2020 BG_{24}	—	May 1, 2016	Cerro Tololo	DECam	·	1.4 km	MPC · JPL
809891	2020 BM_{25}	—	January 21, 2015	Haleakala	Pan-STARRS 1	EOS	1.5 km	MPC · JPL
809892	2020 BZ_{32}	—	January 23, 2020	Haleakala	Pan-STARRS 2	JUN	600 m	MPC · JPL
809893	2020 BA_{35}	—	March 22, 2009	Catalina	CSS	·	1.8 km	MPC · JPL
809894	2020 BR_{35}	—	November 29, 2014	Haleakala	Pan-STARRS 1	·	1.2 km	MPC · JPL
809895	2020 BG_{36}	—	January 26, 2015	Haleakala	Pan-STARRS 1	·	1.3 km	MPC · JPL
809896	2020 BW_{38}	—	January 28, 2015	Haleakala	Pan-STARRS 1	EOS	1.3 km	MPC · JPL
809897	2020 BV_{46}	—	April 2, 2016	Haleakala	Pan-STARRS 1	·	1.3 km	MPC · JPL
809898	2020 BQ_{49}	—	March 21, 2015	Haleakala	Pan-STARRS 1	VER	1.8 km	MPC · JPL
809899	2020 BB_{53}	—	December 10, 2005	Kitt Peak	Spacewatch	·	960 m	MPC · JPL
809900	2020 BR_{53}	—	January 19, 2020	Haleakala	Pan-STARRS 1	·	970 m	MPC · JPL

== 809901–810000 ==
back to top

Designation			Discovery			Properties		Ref
Permanent	Provisional	Named after	Date	Site	Discoverer(s)	Category	Diam.	Ref
809901	2020 BC_{54}	—	May 21, 2017	Haleakala	Pan-STARRS 1	·	1.0 km	MPC · JPL
809902	2020 BP_{58}	—	January 22, 2020	Haleakala	Pan-STARRS 1	·	1.0 km	MPC · JPL
809903	2020 BO_{61}	—	January 23, 2020	Haleakala	Pan-STARRS 1	·	2.1 km	MPC · JPL
809904	2020 BU_{62}	—	January 21, 2020	Haleakala	Pan-STARRS 1	·	1.2 km	MPC · JPL
809905	2020 BT_{65}	—	January 25, 2020	Haleakala	Pan-STARRS 1	·	1.4 km	MPC · JPL
809906	2020 BG_{68}	—	August 19, 2018	Haleakala	Pan-STARRS 1	·	1.7 km	MPC · JPL
809907	2020 BF_{72}	—	March 28, 2016	Cerro Tololo	DECam	·	1.2 km	MPC · JPL
809908	2020 BF_{74}	—	January 22, 2020	Haleakala	Pan-STARRS 2	·	1.2 km	MPC · JPL
809909	2020 BM_{76}	—	January 24, 2020	Mount Lemmon	Mount Lemmon Survey	BRG	1.0 km	MPC · JPL
809910	2020 BO_{77}	—	January 19, 2020	Haleakala	Pan-STARRS 1	BRA	950 m	MPC · JPL
809911	2020 BW_{77}	—	January 23, 2020	Haleakala	Pan-STARRS 2	·	2.1 km	MPC · JPL
809912	2020 BK_{78}	—	April 1, 2016	Haleakala	Pan-STARRS 1	·	1.2 km	MPC · JPL
809913	2020 BU_{78}	—	January 26, 2020	Haleakala	Pan-STARRS 2	·	1.7 km	MPC · JPL
809914	2020 BM_{79}	—	April 2, 2016	Haleakala	Pan-STARRS 1	WIT	680 m	MPC · JPL
809915	2020 BO_{79}	—	January 23, 2020	Mount Lemmon	Mount Lemmon Survey	·	2.1 km	MPC · JPL
809916	2020 BV_{79}	—	January 24, 2020	Mount Lemmon	Mount Lemmon Survey	HOF	1.8 km	MPC · JPL
809917	2020 BE_{80}	—	January 24, 2020	Mount Lemmon	Mount Lemmon Survey	·	1.2 km	MPC · JPL
809918	2020 BJ_{80}	—	January 22, 2020	Haleakala	Pan-STARRS 1	HOF	1.6 km	MPC · JPL
809919	2020 BY_{80}	—	January 25, 2020	Mount Lemmon	Mount Lemmon Survey	·	940 m	MPC · JPL
809920	2020 BC_{81}	—	January 25, 2020	Mount Lemmon	Mount Lemmon Survey	·	1.2 km	MPC · JPL
809921	2020 BF_{81}	—	January 28, 2020	Mount Lemmon	Mount Lemmon Survey	BRA	930 m	MPC · JPL
809922	2020 BW_{81}	—	January 21, 2020	Haleakala	Pan-STARRS 2	MAR	680 m	MPC · JPL
809923	2020 BJ_{82}	—	January 25, 2020	Mount Lemmon	Mount Lemmon Survey	·	1.2 km	MPC · JPL
809924	2020 BY_{82}	—	January 24, 2020	Haleakala	Pan-STARRS 1	·	1.8 km	MPC · JPL
809925	2020 BA_{83}	—	January 21, 2020	Haleakala	Pan-STARRS 1	EOS	1.1 km	MPC · JPL
809926	2020 BN_{83}	—	January 26, 2020	Haleakala	Pan-STARRS 1	·	1.3 km	MPC · JPL
809927	2020 BW_{83}	—	January 22, 2020	Haleakala	Pan-STARRS 1	·	950 m	MPC · JPL
809928	2020 BX_{83}	—	January 21, 2020	Haleakala	Pan-STARRS 2	·	1.3 km	MPC · JPL
809929	2020 BU_{84}	—	January 25, 2020	Mount Lemmon	Mount Lemmon Survey	AGN	750 m	MPC · JPL
809930	2020 BF_{86}	—	August 1, 2000	Cerro Tololo	Deep Ecliptic Survey	·	940 m	MPC · JPL
809931	2020 BF_{87}	—	January 24, 2020	Haleakala	Pan-STARRS 1	·	860 m	MPC · JPL
809932	2020 BJ_{87}	—	January 22, 2020	Haleakala	Pan-STARRS 1	·	1.2 km	MPC · JPL
809933	2020 BA_{88}	—	January 22, 2020	Haleakala	Pan-STARRS 1	·	1.1 km	MPC · JPL
809934	2020 BB_{88}	—	January 21, 2020	Haleakala	Pan-STARRS 1	·	1.2 km	MPC · JPL
809935	2020 BK_{88}	—	April 11, 2016	Haleakala	Pan-STARRS 1	·	1.4 km	MPC · JPL
809936	2020 BM_{88}	—	January 22, 2020	Haleakala	Pan-STARRS 2	·	1.1 km	MPC · JPL
809937	2020 BY_{88}	—	January 25, 2020	Mount Lemmon	Mount Lemmon Survey	·	1.1 km	MPC · JPL
809938	2020 BU_{90}	—	January 24, 2020	Mount Lemmon	Mount Lemmon Survey	EUN	740 m	MPC · JPL
809939	2020 BQ_{91}	—	January 19, 2020	Haleakala	Pan-STARRS 1	·	1.6 km	MPC · JPL
809940	2020 BF_{92}	—	October 17, 2018	Haleakala	Pan-STARRS 2	EOS	1.3 km	MPC · JPL
809941	2020 BT_{93}	—	October 20, 2012	Haleakala	Pan-STARRS 1	·	2.3 km	MPC · JPL
809942	2020 BC_{94}	—	January 26, 2020	Haleakala	Pan-STARRS 1	·	1.4 km	MPC · JPL
809943	2020 BF_{95}	—	September 24, 2008	Kitt Peak	Spacewatch	·	1.4 km	MPC · JPL
809944	2020 BC_{97}	—	March 28, 2015	Haleakala	Pan-STARRS 1	·	2.0 km	MPC · JPL
809945	2020 BO_{99}	—	December 5, 2008	Kitt Peak	Spacewatch	·	1.3 km	MPC · JPL
809946	2020 BQ_{100}	—	January 24, 2020	Mount Lemmon	Mount Lemmon Survey	·	1.2 km	MPC · JPL
809947	2020 BS_{100}	—	September 4, 2008	Kitt Peak	Spacewatch	·	1.2 km	MPC · JPL
809948	2020 BV_{100}	—	November 18, 2007	Mount Lemmon	Mount Lemmon Survey	·	2.1 km	MPC · JPL
809949	2020 BA_{101}	—	January 23, 2020	Haleakala	Pan-STARRS 1	·	1.2 km	MPC · JPL
809950	2020 BE_{101}	—	January 19, 2020	Haleakala	Pan-STARRS 1	·	2.1 km	MPC · JPL
809951	2020 BG_{101}	—	March 10, 2016	Haleakala	Pan-STARRS 1	·	1.3 km	MPC · JPL
809952	2020 BD_{102}	—	January 20, 2015	Haleakala	Pan-STARRS 1	·	1.4 km	MPC · JPL
809953	2020 BU_{105}	—	August 12, 2013	Kitt Peak	Spacewatch	WIT	670 m	MPC · JPL
809954	2020 BT_{107}	—	July 29, 2017	Haleakala	Pan-STARRS 1	·	1.3 km	MPC · JPL
809955	2020 BQ_{111}	—	January 26, 2011	Mount Lemmon	Mount Lemmon Survey	AGN	740 m	MPC · JPL
809956	2020 BV_{116}	—	May 1, 2016	Cerro Tololo	DECam	·	1.3 km	MPC · JPL
809957	2020 BE_{117}	—	January 19, 2020	Haleakala	Pan-STARRS 1	·	1.3 km	MPC · JPL
809958	2020 BF_{118}	—	January 24, 2020	Mount Lemmon	Mount Lemmon Survey	·	1.3 km	MPC · JPL
809959	2020 BS_{118}	—	January 24, 2020	Mount Lemmon	Mount Lemmon Survey	·	890 m	MPC · JPL
809960	2020 BY_{118}	—	December 26, 2014	Haleakala	Pan-STARRS 1	·	1.4 km	MPC · JPL
809961	2020 BD_{119}	—	January 21, 2020	Haleakala	Pan-STARRS 1	·	1.3 km	MPC · JPL
809962	2020 BK_{119}	—	January 21, 2020	Haleakala	Pan-STARRS 1	·	1.1 km	MPC · JPL
809963	2020 BN_{119}	—	January 27, 2020	Haleakala	Pan-STARRS 1	·	1.3 km	MPC · JPL
809964	2020 BN_{122}	—	January 25, 2020	Haleakala	Pan-STARRS 1	·	1.7 km	MPC · JPL
809965	2020 BG_{124}	—	May 12, 2012	Mount Lemmon	Mount Lemmon Survey	·	1.0 km	MPC · JPL
809966	2020 BQ_{124}	—	January 23, 2020	Haleakala	Pan-STARRS 1	·	2.0 km	MPC · JPL
809967	2020 BR_{124}	—	November 26, 2014	Haleakala	Pan-STARRS 1	·	1.3 km	MPC · JPL
809968	2020 BH_{139}	—	December 1, 2014	Haleakala	Pan-STARRS 1	·	1.2 km	MPC · JPL
809969	2020 BD_{140}	—	January 26, 2020	Haleakala	Pan-STARRS 1	·	1.8 km	MPC · JPL
809970	2020 BR_{140}	—	January 22, 2020	Haleakala	Pan-STARRS 1	·	1.2 km	MPC · JPL
809971	2020 BV_{140}	—	January 25, 2020	Mount Lemmon	Mount Lemmon Survey	·	1.7 km	MPC · JPL
809972	2020 BG_{143}	—	November 5, 2018	Haleakala	Pan-STARRS 2	·	1.5 km	MPC · JPL
809973	2020 BY_{143}	—	December 21, 2014	Haleakala	Pan-STARRS 1	KOR	880 m	MPC · JPL
809974	2020 BH_{144}	—	January 19, 2020	Mount Lemmon	Mount Lemmon Survey	·	1.4 km	MPC · JPL
809975	2020 BB_{150}	—	October 25, 2014	Mount Lemmon	Mount Lemmon Survey	·	980 m	MPC · JPL
809976	2020 BA_{151}	—	January 19, 2020	Mount Lemmon	Mount Lemmon Survey	HNS	690 m	MPC · JPL
809977	2020 BE_{163}	—	October 9, 2012	Haleakala	Pan-STARRS 1	·	1.9 km	MPC · JPL
809978	2020 BL_{174}	—	January 21, 2020	Haleakala	Pan-STARRS 1	·	1.3 km	MPC · JPL
809979	2020 BT_{174}	—	November 17, 2014	Haleakala	Pan-STARRS 1	·	1.1 km	MPC · JPL
809980	2020 CK_{3}	—	January 2, 2020	Haleakala	Pan-STARRS 1	·	950 m	MPC · JPL
809981	2020 CO_{3}	—	February 4, 2020	Haleakala	Pan-STARRS 2	·	1.8 km	MPC · JPL
809982	2020 CG_{4}	—	January 28, 2014	Mayhill-ISON	L. Elenin	·	2.5 km	MPC · JPL
809983	2020 CT_{6}	—	October 28, 2017	Haleakala	Pan-STARRS 1	T_{j} (2.99) · 3:2	4.3 km	MPC · JPL
809984	2020 CX_{6}	—	January 27, 2015	Haleakala	Pan-STARRS 1	·	1.7 km	MPC · JPL
809985	2020 CH_{7}	—	February 5, 2020	Haleakala	Pan-STARRS 1	·	2.5 km	MPC · JPL
809986	2020 CQ_{8}	—	February 2, 2020	Mount Lemmon	Mount Lemmon Survey	·	1.6 km	MPC · JPL
809987	2020 CF_{9}	—	February 1, 2020	Mount Lemmon	Mount Lemmon Survey	·	1.5 km	MPC · JPL
809988	2020 DK_{3}	—	September 3, 2016	Mount Lemmon	Mount Lemmon Survey	H	390 m	MPC · JPL
809989	2020 DT_{5}	—	October 10, 2018	Mount Lemmon	Mount Lemmon Survey	·	1.2 km	MPC · JPL
809990	2020 DC_{6}	—	February 29, 2020	Kitt Peak	Bok NEO Survey	·	2.4 km	MPC · JPL
809991	2020 DT_{7}	—	August 7, 2016	Haleakala	Pan-STARRS 1	EOS	1.2 km	MPC · JPL
809992	2020 DJ_{8}	—	November 19, 2009	Mount Lemmon	Mount Lemmon Survey	·	1.2 km	MPC · JPL
809993	2020 DC_{10}	—	May 20, 2015	Cerro Tololo	DECam	THM	1.7 km	MPC · JPL
809994	2020 DW_{10}	—	February 21, 2020	Cerro Paranal	Gaia Ground Based Optical Tracking	·	940 m	MPC · JPL
809995	2020 DR_{12}	—	July 30, 2009	Kitt Peak	Spacewatch	·	920 m	MPC · JPL
809996	2020 DT_{14}	—	February 29, 2020	Kitt Peak	Bok NEO Survey	·	1.8 km	MPC · JPL
809997	2020 DC_{15}	—	November 28, 2018	Mount Lemmon	Mount Lemmon Survey	·	1.5 km	MPC · JPL
809998	2020 DS_{15}	—	January 13, 2015	Haleakala	Pan-STARRS 1	·	1.3 km	MPC · JPL
809999	2020 DW_{16}	—	July 7, 2016	Haleakala	Pan-STARRS 1	·	2.4 km	MPC · JPL
810000	2020 DP_{18}	—	February 16, 2020	Mount Lemmon	Mount Lemmon Survey	EOS	1.0 km	MPC · JPL

back to top
