= C/1998 J1 (SOHO) =

Hyperbolic comet

Discovery
- Discovered by: SOHO; S. Stezelberger
- Discovery date: 3 May 1998

Designations
- Alternative designations: SOHO-49

Orbital characteristics
- Epoch: 9 June 1998 (JD 2450973.5)
- Observation arc: 94 days
- Number of observations: 318
- Perihelion: 0.153 AU
- Eccentricity: 1.00017
- Inclination: 62.932°
- Longitude of ascending node: 351.65°
- Argument of periapsis: 110.56°
- Mean anomaly: 0.0012°
- Last perihelion: 8 May 1998
- Earth MOID: 0.316 AU
- Jupiter MOID: 3.143 AU

Physical characteristics
- Comet total magnitude (M1): 6.5
- Comet nuclear magnitude (M2): 10.0
- Apparent magnitude: 0.0 (1998 apparition)

C/1998 J1 (SOHO) is a hyperbolic comet discovered from the edge of SOHO's LASCO-C3 field-of-view on 3 May 1998. It is one of the few small comets observed by SOHO that has survived its close encounter with the Sun.

== Observational history ==
S. Stezelberger first spotted the comet from a series of photographs taken by the LASCO-C3 instrument of the Solar and Heliospheric Observatory on 3 May 1998, making it the spacecraft's 49th comet discovery since January 1996.

Nicolas Biver and H. Dahle made the first ground observations of the comet from Oahu, Hawaii on 11 May 1998. They reported that the comet was an extremely condensed object around magnitude 0.5 in brightness. At the time, the comet was positioned near the Pleiades cluster, allowing Jost Jahn to perform astrometry measurements. Earlier, on 9 May 1998, Alan Hale, Gary W. Kronk and Mauro V. Zanotta also attempted ground observations but failed to find the comet.
