= List of minor planets: 615001–616000 =

The following is a partial list of minor planets, running from minor-planet number 615001 through 616000, inclusive. The primary data for this and other partial lists is based on JPL's "Small-Body Orbital Elements" and data available from the Minor Planet Center. Critical list information is also provided by the MPC, unless otherwise specified from Lowell Observatory. A detailed description of the table's columns and additional sources are given on the main page including a complete list of every page in this series, and a statistical break-up on the dynamical classification of minor planets.

Also see the summary list of all named bodies in numerical and alphabetical order, and the corresponding naming citations for the number range of this particular list. New namings may only be added to this list after official publication, as the preannouncement of names is condemned by the Working Group for Small Bodies Nomenclature of the International Astronomical Union.

Near-Earth obj.	MBA (inner)	MBA (outer)	Centaur
Mars-crosser	MBA (middle)	Jupiter trojan	Trans-Neptunian obj.
Unclassified

== 615001–615100 ==
Designation			Discovery			Properties		Ref
Permanent	Provisional	Named after	Date	Site	Discoverer(s)	Category	Diam.	Ref
615001	2001 TO_{262}	—	January 7, 2010	Kitt Peak	Spacewatch	·	1.2 km	MPC · JPL
615002	2001 TZ_{262}	—	September 25, 2006	Mount Lemmon	Mount Lemmon Survey	·	2.3 km	MPC · JPL
615003	2001 TN_{268}	—	October 14, 2001	Apache Point	SDSS Collaboration	AEO	760 m	MPC · JPL
615004	2001 TC_{269}	—	September 17, 2010	Kitt Peak	Spacewatch	·	1.2 km	MPC · JPL
615005	2001 UM_{11}	—	October 18, 2001	Palomar	NEAT	·	1.6 km	MPC · JPL
615006	2001 UE_{32}	—	October 16, 2001	Kitt Peak	Spacewatch	·	1.1 km	MPC · JPL
615007	2001 UV_{60}	—	October 17, 2001	Socorro	LINEAR	·	890 m	MPC · JPL
615008	2001 UW_{67}	—	October 20, 2001	Socorro	LINEAR	MAS	650 m	MPC · JPL
615009	2001 UL_{87}	—	October 18, 2001	Kitt Peak	Spacewatch	·	1.5 km	MPC · JPL
615010	2001 UV_{89}	—	October 20, 2001	Kitt Peak	Spacewatch	H	350 m	MPC · JPL
615011	2001 UN_{95}	—	October 23, 2001	Palomar	NEAT	PHO	820 m	MPC · JPL
615012	2001 UU_{101}	—	October 18, 2001	Palomar	NEAT	·	1.6 km	MPC · JPL
615013	2001 UQ_{102}	—	October 20, 2001	Socorro	LINEAR	·	1.2 km	MPC · JPL
615014	2001 UT_{110}	—	October 21, 2001	Socorro	LINEAR	ADE	1.6 km	MPC · JPL
615015	2001 UH_{139}	—	October 18, 2001	Palomar	NEAT	NYS	1.0 km	MPC · JPL
615016	2001 UP_{215}	—	October 23, 2001	Socorro	LINEAR	·	670 m	MPC · JPL
615017	2001 UO_{226}	—	October 16, 2001	Palomar	NEAT	·	2.2 km	MPC · JPL
615018	2001 UY_{228}	—	July 29, 2008	Mount Lemmon	Mount Lemmon Survey	V	640 m	MPC · JPL
615019	2001 UO_{231}	—	September 18, 2001	Apache Point	SDSS Collaboration	·	2.7 km	MPC · JPL
615020	2001 UP_{232}	—	September 3, 2008	Kitt Peak	Spacewatch	·	760 m	MPC · JPL
615021	2001 UL_{233}	—	November 4, 2012	Kitt Peak	Spacewatch	EOS	1.7 km	MPC · JPL
615022	2001 UW_{233}	—	October 26, 2001	Kitt Peak	Spacewatch	·	2.6 km	MPC · JPL
615023	2001 UC_{234}	—	March 12, 2008	Mount Lemmon	Mount Lemmon Survey	·	1.6 km	MPC · JPL
615024	2001 UH_{234}	—	January 15, 2015	Haleakala	Pan-STARRS 1	·	2.9 km	MPC · JPL
615025	2001 UQ_{235}	—	January 30, 2009	Mount Lemmon	Mount Lemmon Survey	·	710 m	MPC · JPL
615026	2001 UH_{236}	—	October 21, 2001	Kitt Peak	Spacewatch	·	810 m	MPC · JPL
615027	2001 UO_{236}	—	January 11, 2011	Kitt Peak	Spacewatch	3:2	3.6 km	MPC · JPL
615028	2001 UM_{239}	—	April 3, 2011	Haleakala	Pan-STARRS 1	NYS	760 m	MPC · JPL
615029	2001 UA_{240}	—	November 26, 2009	Mount Lemmon	Mount Lemmon Survey	NYS	920 m	MPC · JPL
615030	2001 UB_{240}	—	September 18, 2001	Apache Point	SDSS	EOS	1.4 km	MPC · JPL
615031	2001 UC_{241}	—	October 25, 2001	Apache Point	SDSS Collaboration	AGN	990 m	MPC · JPL
615032	2001 VG_{6}	—	November 9, 2001	Socorro	LINEAR	NYS	950 m	MPC · JPL
615033	2001 VD_{73}	—	November 12, 2001	Kitt Peak	Spacewatch	MAS	630 m	MPC · JPL
615034	2001 VT_{76}	—	November 12, 2001	Socorro	LINEAR	H	500 m	MPC · JPL
615035	2001 VB_{78}	—	November 11, 2001	Kitt Peak	Spacewatch	AGN	940 m	MPC · JPL
615036	2001 VX_{84}	—	November 12, 2001	Socorro	LINEAR	H	630 m	MPC · JPL
615037	2001 VS_{135}	—	March 11, 2014	Mount Lemmon	Mount Lemmon Survey	·	900 m	MPC · JPL
615038	2001 VF_{136}	—	September 25, 2009	Mount Lemmon	Mount Lemmon Survey	MIS	2.2 km	MPC · JPL
615039	2001 VB_{139}	—	November 12, 2001	Apache Point	SDSS Collaboration	·	490 m	MPC · JPL
615040	2001 WU	—	November 16, 2001	Kitt Peak	Spacewatch	NYS	720 m	MPC · JPL
615041	2001 WB_{5}	—	November 20, 2001	Socorro	LINEAR	H	610 m	MPC · JPL
615042	2001 WY_{20}	—	September 20, 2001	Socorro	LINEAR	·	1.7 km	MPC · JPL
615043	2001 WH_{43}	—	October 10, 2001	Kitt Peak	Spacewatch	·	1.1 km	MPC · JPL
615044	2001 WB_{54}	—	October 18, 2001	Kitt Peak	Spacewatch	·	1.3 km	MPC · JPL
615045	2001 WL_{65}	—	October 11, 2001	Palomar	NEAT	·	1.1 km	MPC · JPL
615046	2001 WA_{105}	—	August 12, 2012	Siding Spring	SSS	·	910 m	MPC · JPL
615047	2001 WG_{105}	—	November 26, 2005	Mount Lemmon	Mount Lemmon Survey	MAS	560 m	MPC · JPL
615048	2001 WJ_{105}	—	March 24, 2012	Catalina	CSS	·	2.2 km	MPC · JPL
615049	2001 WN_{105}	—	October 1, 2005	Mount Lemmon	Mount Lemmon Survey	·	1.1 km	MPC · JPL
615050	2001 WT_{105}	—	November 17, 2001	Kitt Peak	Spacewatch	NYS	690 m	MPC · JPL
615051	2001 WA_{107}	—	October 16, 2012	Kitt Peak	Spacewatch	MAS	660 m	MPC · JPL
615052	2001 WG_{107}	—	September 3, 2013	Kitt Peak	Spacewatch	L5	9.8 km	MPC · JPL
615053	2001 XZ_{31}	—	December 11, 2001	Socorro	LINEAR	·	1.1 km	MPC · JPL
615054	2001 XZ_{78}	—	December 11, 2001	Socorro	LINEAR	·	3.1 km	MPC · JPL
615055	2001 XQ_{103}	—	December 14, 2001	Socorro	LINEAR	H	420 m	MPC · JPL
615056	2001 XG_{232}	—	December 15, 2001	Socorro	LINEAR	H	490 m	MPC · JPL
615057	2001 XN_{268}	—	September 24, 2012	Kitt Peak	Spacewatch	·	1.3 km	MPC · JPL
615058	2001 XB_{269}	—	March 20, 2017	Haleakala	Pan-STARRS 1	·	1.7 km	MPC · JPL
615059	2001 XJ_{269}	—	December 13, 2013	Mount Lemmon	Mount Lemmon Survey	·	2.6 km	MPC · JPL
615060	2001 YH	—	December 17, 2001	Socorro	LINEAR	H	590 m	MPC · JPL
615061	2001 YM_{125}	—	December 17, 2001	Socorro	LINEAR	·	1 km	MPC · JPL
615062	2001 YA_{148}	—	December 18, 2001	Socorro	LINEAR	·	1.8 km	MPC · JPL
615063	2001 YW_{162}	—	December 19, 2001	Kitt Peak	Spacewatch	·	590 m	MPC · JPL
615064	2002 AX_{19}	—	January 9, 2002	Socorro	LINEAR	H	660 m	MPC · JPL
615065	2002 AA_{140}	—	January 13, 2002	Socorro	LINEAR	PHO	1.1 km	MPC · JPL
615066	2002 AK_{169}	—	January 14, 2002	Socorro	LINEAR	·	1.1 km	MPC · JPL
615067	2002 AN_{211}	—	March 3, 2013	Mount Lemmon	Mount Lemmon Survey	·	670 m	MPC · JPL
615068	2002 AA_{214}	—	October 25, 2009	Mount Lemmon	Mount Lemmon Survey	·	1.6 km	MPC · JPL
615069	2002 AH_{214}	—	July 23, 2009	Siding Spring	SSS	·	2.0 km	MPC · JPL
615070	2002 BM_{33}	—	January 22, 2002	Kitt Peak	Spacewatch	·	1.5 km	MPC · JPL
615071	2002 CP_{185}	—	February 10, 2002	Socorro	LINEAR	·	1.0 km	MPC · JPL
615072	2002 CV_{204}	—	February 10, 2002	Kitt Peak	Spacewatch	·	1.3 km	MPC · JPL
615073	2002 CA_{222}	—	February 11, 2002	Socorro	LINEAR	MAS	660 m	MPC · JPL
615074	2002 CR_{264}	—	February 9, 2002	Kitt Peak	Spacewatch	·	1.5 km	MPC · JPL
615075	2002 CM_{318}	—	April 21, 2013	Haleakala	Pan-STARRS 1	·	2.6 km	MPC · JPL
615076	2002 CY_{319}	—	March 7, 1995	Kitt Peak	Spacewatch	·	590 m	MPC · JPL
615077	2002 CA_{320}	—	November 2, 2007	Mount Lemmon	Mount Lemmon Survey	·	640 m	MPC · JPL
615078	2002 CN_{320}	—	October 31, 2013	Kitt Peak	Spacewatch	·	490 m	MPC · JPL
615079	2002 CA_{321}	—	February 13, 2002	Kitt Peak	Spacewatch	·	1.5 km	MPC · JPL
615080	2002 CV_{321}	—	August 13, 2012	Haleakala	Pan-STARRS 1	·	900 m	MPC · JPL
615081	2002 CX_{325}	—	September 6, 2016	Mount Lemmon	Mount Lemmon Survey	·	500 m	MPC · JPL
615082	2002 DW_{4}	—	February 17, 2002	Cerro Tololo	Deep Lens Survey	·	700 m	MPC · JPL
615083	2002 DX_{16}	—	February 20, 2002	Anderson Mesa	LONEOS	·	2.8 km	MPC · JPL
615084	2002 EL_{37}	—	March 9, 2002	Kitt Peak	Spacewatch	·	1.5 km	MPC · JPL
615085	2002 EW_{76}	—	March 11, 2002	Kitt Peak	Spacewatch	KOR	1.3 km	MPC · JPL
615086	2002 EK_{165}	—	January 19, 2013	Mount Lemmon	Mount Lemmon Survey	ERI	1.4 km	MPC · JPL
615087	2002 EX_{165}	—	March 9, 2002	Palomar	NEAT	·	560 m	MPC · JPL
615088	2002 EC_{166}	—	December 4, 2012	Mount Lemmon	Mount Lemmon Survey	·	1.2 km	MPC · JPL
615089	2002 EC_{167}	—	September 21, 2003	Kitt Peak	Spacewatch	·	550 m	MPC · JPL
615090	2002 ET_{169}	—	August 25, 2014	Haleakala	Pan-STARRS 1	·	1.5 km	MPC · JPL
615091	2002 GM_{192}	—	September 24, 2011	Haleakala	Pan-STARRS 1	T_{j} (2.99)	3.0 km	MPC · JPL
615092	2002 GK_{193}	—	January 13, 2008	Kitt Peak	Spacewatch	·	580 m	MPC · JPL
615093	2002 GR_{193}	—	September 29, 1994	Kitt Peak	Spacewatch	·	2.0 km	MPC · JPL
615094	2002 GB_{195}	—	February 21, 2009	Catalina	CSS	·	900 m	MPC · JPL
615095	2002 GK_{195}	—	March 6, 2011	Mount Lemmon	Mount Lemmon Survey	·	1.4 km	MPC · JPL
615096	2002 GD_{197}	—	May 6, 2006	Mount Lemmon	Mount Lemmon Survey	·	1.0 km	MPC · JPL
615097	2002 HD_{19}	—	April 8, 2010	Kitt Peak	Spacewatch	·	850 m	MPC · JPL
615098	2002 JN_{3}	—	May 4, 2002	Kitt Peak	Spacewatch	·	880 m	MPC · JPL
615099	2002 JQ_{152}	—	October 16, 2003	Kitt Peak	Spacewatch	·	2.7 km	MPC · JPL
615100	2002 KL_{17}	—	February 5, 2009	Kitt Peak	Spacewatch	·	900 m	MPC · JPL

== 615101–615200 ==
back to top

Designation			Discovery			Properties		Ref
Permanent	Provisional	Named after	Date	Site	Discoverer(s)	Category	Diam.	Ref
615101	2002 LD_{3}	—	June 5, 2002	Kitt Peak	Spacewatch	·	1.0 km	MPC · JPL
615102	2002 LM_{56}	—	May 12, 2002	Palomar	NEAT	·	880 m	MPC · JPL
615103	2002 LA_{64}	—	June 13, 2002	Kitt Peak	Spacewatch	·	1.2 km	MPC · JPL
615104	2002 LM_{64}	—	June 15, 2002	Palomar	NEAT	·	1.1 km	MPC · JPL
615105	2002 LR_{64}	—	August 13, 2002	Palomar	NEAT	·	1.2 km	MPC · JPL
615106	2002 LW_{64}	—	February 3, 2009	Mount Lemmon	Mount Lemmon Survey	·	1.8 km	MPC · JPL
615107	2002 LO_{65}	—	April 4, 2005	Mount Lemmon	Mount Lemmon Survey	·	550 m	MPC · JPL
615108	2002 LL_{66}	—	June 2, 2002	Palomar	NEAT	·	3.0 km	MPC · JPL
615109	2002 MX_{5}	—	June 26, 2002	Palomar	NEAT	·	2.2 km	MPC · JPL
615110	2002 MR_{7}	—	August 5, 2002	Palomar	NEAT	·	790 m	MPC · JPL
615111	2002 MA_{8}	—	January 21, 2015	Haleakala	Pan-STARRS 1	·	630 m	MPC · JPL
615112	2002 NA_{42}	—	July 14, 2002	Palomar	NEAT	·	530 m	MPC · JPL
615113	2002 NG_{48}	—	July 14, 2002	Palomar	NEAT	EUN	1.5 km	MPC · JPL
615114	2002 NE_{67}	—	July 5, 2002	Kitt Peak	Spacewatch	(5)	1.2 km	MPC · JPL
615115	2002 NU_{70}	—	July 9, 2002	Palomar	NEAT	·	2.7 km	MPC · JPL
615116	2002 ND_{71}	—	July 8, 2002	Palomar	NEAT	·	2.4 km	MPC · JPL
615117	2002 NG_{71}	—	July 8, 2002	Palomar	NEAT	EOS	1.9 km	MPC · JPL
615118	2002 NQ_{73}	—	July 12, 2002	Palomar	NEAT	·	3.3 km	MPC · JPL
615119	2002 NA_{74}	—	August 24, 2002	Palomar	NEAT	·	2.9 km	MPC · JPL
615120	2002 NP_{75}	—	June 18, 2002	Campo Imperatore	CINEOS	·	1.1 km	MPC · JPL
615121	2002 NY_{75}	—	September 23, 2008	Kitt Peak	Spacewatch	·	2.1 km	MPC · JPL
615122	2002 NO_{77}	—	August 27, 2009	Kitt Peak	Spacewatch	·	550 m	MPC · JPL
615123	2002 NU_{78}	—	February 8, 2011	Mount Lemmon	Mount Lemmon Survey	·	710 m	MPC · JPL
615124	2002 NZ_{79}	—	December 16, 2007	Kitt Peak	Spacewatch	(5)	1.2 km	MPC · JPL
615125	2002 NE_{81}	—	February 2, 2009	Kitt Peak	Spacewatch	·	1.4 km	MPC · JPL
615126	2002 NO_{83}	—	October 18, 2009	Mount Lemmon	Mount Lemmon Survey	·	550 m	MPC · JPL
615127	2002 NZ_{83}	—	September 9, 2013	Haleakala	Pan-STARRS 1	·	1.7 km	MPC · JPL
615128	2002 OH_{28}	—	July 14, 2002	Palomar	NEAT	(5)	1.1 km	MPC · JPL
615129	2002 OO_{29}	—	July 17, 2002	Palomar	NEAT	·	1.3 km	MPC · JPL
615130	2002 OP_{33}	—	July 21, 2002	Palomar	NEAT	EUN	1.1 km	MPC · JPL
615131	2002 OT_{35}	—	September 10, 2007	Mount Lemmon	Mount Lemmon Survey	·	1.2 km	MPC · JPL
615132	2002 OW_{36}	—	December 18, 2007	Mount Lemmon	Mount Lemmon Survey	·	1.2 km	MPC · JPL
615133	2002 OH_{37}	—	July 22, 2002	Palomar	NEAT	EUN	1.0 km	MPC · JPL
615134	2002 OP_{37}	—	October 26, 2008	Mount Lemmon	Mount Lemmon Survey	·	2.1 km	MPC · JPL
615135	2002 OA_{38}	—	August 24, 2002	Palomar	NEAT	·	1.5 km	MPC · JPL
615136	2002 OD_{38}	—	July 21, 2002	Palomar	NEAT	(5)	1.3 km	MPC · JPL
615137	2002 OO_{38}	—	October 28, 2008	Kitt Peak	Spacewatch	·	1.6 km	MPC · JPL
615138	2002 PW	—	July 8, 2002	Palomar	NEAT	·	3.7 km	MPC · JPL
615139	2002 PN_{3}	—	August 3, 2002	Palomar	NEAT	·	1.2 km	MPC · JPL
615140	2002 PM_{14}	—	June 24, 2002	Palomar	NEAT	·	1.4 km	MPC · JPL
615141	2002 PH_{19}	—	August 6, 2002	Palomar	NEAT	·	630 m	MPC · JPL
615142	2002 PC_{20}	—	August 6, 2002	Palomar	NEAT	MAR	850 m	MPC · JPL
615143	2002 PJ_{40}	—	June 18, 2002	Kitt Peak	Spacewatch	·	890 m	MPC · JPL
615144	2002 PR_{64}	—	July 17, 2002	Palomar	NEAT	·	960 m	MPC · JPL
615145	2002 PP_{70}	—	July 21, 2002	Palomar	NEAT	·	1.5 km	MPC · JPL
615146	2002 PZ_{86}	—	July 20, 2002	Palomar	NEAT	·	1.2 km	MPC · JPL
615147	2002 PX_{110}	—	August 13, 2002	Socorro	LINEAR	·	690 m	MPC · JPL
615148	2002 PK_{150}	—	August 6, 2002	Palomar	NEAT	·	1.3 km	MPC · JPL
615149	2002 PG_{155}	—	August 8, 2002	Palomar	NEAT	EUN	1.2 km	MPC · JPL
615150	2002 PV_{156}	—	August 8, 2002	Palomar	NEAT	·	2.1 km	MPC · JPL
615151	2002 PL_{157}	—	August 8, 2002	Palomar	NEAT	·	1.5 km	MPC · JPL
615152	2002 PQ_{162}	—	August 8, 2002	Powell	Powell	·	510 m	MPC · JPL
615153	2002 PJ_{164}	—	August 8, 2002	Palomar	NEAT	·	2.5 km	MPC · JPL
615154	2002 PH_{168}	—	August 19, 2002	Palomar	NEAT	·	2.5 km	MPC · JPL
615155	2002 PE_{181}	—	August 15, 2002	Palomar	NEAT	·	990 m	MPC · JPL
615156	2002 PC_{182}	—	August 15, 2002	Palomar	NEAT	·	560 m	MPC · JPL
615157	2002 PW_{186}	—	August 11, 2002	Palomar	NEAT	·	1.2 km	MPC · JPL
615158	2002 PW_{189}	—	August 7, 2002	Palomar	NEAT	·	980 m	MPC · JPL
615159	2002 PU_{191}	—	February 20, 2009	Kitt Peak	Spacewatch	·	1.2 km	MPC · JPL
615160	2002 PR_{192}	—	August 8, 2002	Palomar	NEAT	·	2.4 km	MPC · JPL
615161	2002 PT_{193}	—	August 11, 2002	Haleakala	NEAT	·	1.9 km	MPC · JPL
615162	2002 PW_{193}	—	December 13, 2006	Mount Lemmon	Mount Lemmon Survey	·	650 m	MPC · JPL
615163	2002 PZ_{193}	—	October 11, 2002	Apache Point	SDSS Collaboration	·	870 m	MPC · JPL
615164	2002 PX_{194}	—	January 8, 2010	Kitt Peak	Spacewatch	·	2.3 km	MPC · JPL
615165	2002 PN_{195}	—	August 12, 2002	Anderson Mesa	LONEOS	BRG	1.9 km	MPC · JPL
615166	2002 PQ_{195}	—	August 11, 2002	Palomar	NEAT	(5)	780 m	MPC · JPL
615167	2002 PZ_{195}	—	August 20, 2009	Kitt Peak	Spacewatch	·	680 m	MPC · JPL
615168	2002 PV_{196}	—	March 3, 2006	Kitt Peak	Spacewatch	·	2.6 km	MPC · JPL
615169	2002 PH_{197}	—	November 22, 2009	Catalina	CSS	·	570 m	MPC · JPL
615170	2002 PW_{198}	—	January 18, 2009	Kitt Peak	Spacewatch	·	1.2 km	MPC · JPL
615171	2002 PK_{199}	—	August 8, 2002	Palomar	NEAT	·	700 m	MPC · JPL
615172	2002 PA_{200}	—	November 26, 2011	Mount Lemmon	Mount Lemmon Survey	·	990 m	MPC · JPL
615173	2002 PE_{200}	—	November 17, 2009	Mount Lemmon	Mount Lemmon Survey	·	460 m	MPC · JPL
615174	2002 PW_{202}	—	September 1, 2002	Palomar	NEAT	·	2.2 km	MPC · JPL
615175	2002 PY_{202}	—	September 3, 2002	Palomar	NEAT	·	1.6 km	MPC · JPL
615176	2002 PL_{203}	—	July 25, 2015	Haleakala	Pan-STARRS 1	·	1.1 km	MPC · JPL
615177	2002 PG_{204}	—	August 3, 2002	Palomar	NEAT	·	520 m	MPC · JPL
615178	2002 PT_{204}	—	September 14, 2002	Anderson Mesa	LONEOS	BAR	1.1 km	MPC · JPL
615179	2002 PY_{204}	—	January 19, 2015	Haleakala	Pan-STARRS 1	·	670 m	MPC · JPL
615180	2002 PE_{205}	—	July 1, 2011	Mount Lemmon	Mount Lemmon Survey	·	1.8 km	MPC · JPL
615181	2002 QD	—	August 16, 2002	Palomar	NEAT	·	1.6 km	MPC · JPL
615182	2002 QN_{27}	—	August 28, 2002	Palomar	NEAT	·	1.4 km	MPC · JPL
615183	2002 QY_{36}	—	August 30, 2002	Kitt Peak	Spacewatch	·	630 m	MPC · JPL
615184	2002 QM_{46}	—	August 11, 2002	Palomar	NEAT	·	1.3 km	MPC · JPL
615185	2002 QE_{50}	—	August 29, 2002	Palomar	R. Matson	·	2.8 km	MPC · JPL
615186	2002 QO_{51}	—	August 29, 2002	Palomar	NEAT	·	630 m	MPC · JPL
615187	2002 QO_{56}	—	August 29, 2002	Palomar	NEAT	·	950 m	MPC · JPL
615188	2002 QU_{56}	—	August 29, 2002	Palomar	NEAT	·	870 m	MPC · JPL
615189	2002 QT_{58}	—	August 8, 2002	Palomar	NEAT	·	2.4 km	MPC · JPL
615190	2002 QF_{59}	—	August 16, 2002	Palomar	NEAT	EOS	1.8 km	MPC · JPL
615191	2002 QV_{60}	—	August 28, 2002	Palomar	NEAT	(5)	1.3 km	MPC · JPL
615192	2002 QJ_{63}	—	August 28, 2002	Palomar	NEAT	·	630 m	MPC · JPL
615193	2002 QR_{63}	—	August 28, 2002	Palomar	NEAT	H	330 m	MPC · JPL
615194	2002 QW_{72}	—	August 30, 2002	Palomar	NEAT	·	690 m	MPC · JPL
615195	2002 QZ_{72}	—	August 28, 2002	Palomar	NEAT	·	1.4 km	MPC · JPL
615196	2002 QP_{82}	—	August 30, 2002	Palomar	NEAT	·	1.6 km	MPC · JPL
615197	2002 QT_{82}	—	August 30, 2002	Palomar	NEAT	·	430 m	MPC · JPL
615198	2002 QG_{83}	—	August 27, 2002	Palomar	NEAT	·	640 m	MPC · JPL
615199	2002 QS_{83}	—	August 17, 2002	Palomar	NEAT	·	2.4 km	MPC · JPL
615200	2002 QY_{86}	—	August 29, 2002	Palomar	NEAT	·	690 m	MPC · JPL

== 615201–615300 ==
back to top

Designation			Discovery			Properties		Ref
Permanent	Provisional	Named after	Date	Site	Discoverer(s)	Category	Diam.	Ref
615201	2002 QK_{91}	—	August 19, 2002	Palomar	NEAT	fast	720 m	MPC · JPL
615202	2002 QS_{91}	—	August 30, 2002	Palomar	NEAT	·	930 m	MPC · JPL
615203	2002 QS_{94}	—	August 27, 2002	Palomar	NEAT	·	1.5 km	MPC · JPL
615204	2002 QM_{95}	—	August 29, 2002	Palomar	NEAT	·	1.3 km	MPC · JPL
615205	2002 QF_{96}	—	August 12, 2002	Cerro Tololo	Deep Ecliptic Survey	·	1.0 km	MPC · JPL
615206	2002 QY_{100}	—	August 19, 2002	Palomar	NEAT	·	1.1 km	MPC · JPL
615207	2002 QZ_{106}	—	August 6, 2002	Palomar	NEAT	(5)	1.3 km	MPC · JPL
615208	2002 QV_{109}	—	August 17, 2002	Palomar	NEAT	·	660 m	MPC · JPL
615209	2002 QG_{116}	—	June 19, 2006	Mount Lemmon	Mount Lemmon Survey	EUN	1.1 km	MPC · JPL
615210	2002 QG_{117}	—	August 16, 2002	Palomar	NEAT	·	1.4 km	MPC · JPL
615211	2002 QH_{118}	—	August 30, 2002	Palomar	NEAT	·	1.0 km	MPC · JPL
615212	2002 QR_{120}	—	August 30, 2002	Palomar	NEAT	V	460 m	MPC · JPL
615213	2002 QM_{124}	—	August 16, 2002	Palomar	NEAT	·	2.6 km	MPC · JPL
615214 Molnárkristian	2002 QY_{132}	Molnárkristian	August 17, 2002	Palomar	NEAT	·	790 m	MPC · JPL
615215	2002 QD_{134}	—	August 30, 2002	Palomar	NEAT	·	520 m	MPC · JPL
615216	2002 QO_{134}	—	August 30, 2002	Palomar	NEAT	·	2.4 km	MPC · JPL
615217	2002 QA_{137}	—	August 28, 2002	Palomar	NEAT	EOS	1.7 km	MPC · JPL
615218	2002 QH_{138}	—	March 3, 2005	Catalina	CSS	·	1.4 km	MPC · JPL
615219	2002 QP_{140}	—	April 26, 2006	Kitt Peak	Spacewatch	EOS	1.6 km	MPC · JPL
615220	2002 QP_{143}	—	August 27, 2002	Palomar	NEAT	·	1.2 km	MPC · JPL
615221	2002 QZ_{143}	—	August 20, 2009	La Sagra	OAM	·	630 m	MPC · JPL
615222	2002 QQ_{148}	—	November 8, 2008	Mount Lemmon	Mount Lemmon Survey	·	1.8 km	MPC · JPL
615223	2002 QM_{149}	—	August 16, 2002	Palomar	NEAT	·	1.1 km	MPC · JPL
615224	2002 QE_{156}	—	September 5, 2013	Catalina	CSS	·	2.5 km	MPC · JPL
615225	2002 QS_{157}	—	August 17, 2009	Kitt Peak	Spacewatch	·	1.0 km	MPC · JPL
615226	2002 QZ_{157}	—	November 22, 2006	Catalina	CSS	V	660 m	MPC · JPL
615227	2002 QX_{158}	—	August 30, 2002	Kitt Peak	Spacewatch	·	500 m	MPC · JPL
615228	2002 QJ_{159}	—	October 25, 2008	Kitt Peak	Spacewatch	·	1.9 km	MPC · JPL
615229	2002 QR_{159}	—	August 18, 2002	Palomar	NEAT	·	990 m	MPC · JPL
615230	2002 RD_{3}	—	September 4, 2002	Anderson Mesa	LONEOS	·	860 m	MPC · JPL
615231	2002 RQ_{5}	—	September 3, 2002	Palomar	NEAT	EUN	1.1 km	MPC · JPL
615232	2002 RJ_{67}	—	September 3, 2002	Palomar	NEAT	·	2.1 km	MPC · JPL
615233	2002 RW_{114}	—	July 22, 2002	Palomar	NEAT	·	1.0 km	MPC · JPL
615234	2002 RJ_{167}	—	October 3, 1997	Kitt Peak	Spacewatch	·	1.8 km	MPC · JPL
615235	2002 RD_{181}	—	September 5, 2002	Socorro	LINEAR	·	1.0 km	MPC · JPL
615236	2002 RY_{190}	—	September 13, 2002	Socorro	LINEAR	PHO	860 m	MPC · JPL
615237	2002 RF_{191}	—	September 5, 2002	Socorro	LINEAR	·	1.0 km	MPC · JPL
615238	2002 RT_{191}	—	September 12, 2002	Palomar	NEAT	·	2.3 km	MPC · JPL
615239	2002 RC_{205}	—	September 14, 2002	Palomar	NEAT	·	2.1 km	MPC · JPL
615240	2002 RH_{206}	—	September 14, 2002	Palomar	NEAT	·	1.2 km	MPC · JPL
615241	2002 RX_{209}	—	September 15, 2002	Kitt Peak	Spacewatch	·	2.1 km	MPC · JPL
615242	2002 RH_{215}	—	September 13, 2002	Socorro	LINEAR	·	930 m	MPC · JPL
615243	2002 RM_{219}	—	September 5, 2002	Socorro	LINEAR	·	890 m	MPC · JPL
615244	2002 RZ_{221}	—	February 14, 2000	Kitt Peak	Spacewatch	·	1.1 km	MPC · JPL
615245	2002 RU_{224}	—	September 13, 2002	Palomar	NEAT	·	2.7 km	MPC · JPL
615246	2002 RB_{231}	—	September 15, 2002	Haleakala	NEAT	·	740 m	MPC · JPL
615247	2002 RW_{236}	—	September 14, 2002	Palomar	R. Matson	(2076)	590 m	MPC · JPL
615248	2002 RC_{241}	—	September 14, 2002	Palomar	NEAT	·	1.9 km	MPC · JPL
615249	2002 RM_{241}	—	September 6, 2002	Socorro	LINEAR	·	2.3 km	MPC · JPL
615250	2002 RA_{248}	—	September 9, 2002	Haleakala	NEAT	·	830 m	MPC · JPL
615251	2002 RE_{251}	—	September 1, 2002	Palomar	NEAT	·	2.0 km	MPC · JPL
615252	2002 RB_{256}	—	September 12, 2002	Palomar	NEAT	·	2.6 km	MPC · JPL
615253	2002 RY_{257}	—	September 14, 2002	Palomar	NEAT	·	2.5 km	MPC · JPL
615254	2002 RM_{258}	—	September 14, 2002	Palomar	NEAT	·	1.9 km	MPC · JPL
615255	2002 RR_{262}	—	September 13, 2002	Palomar	NEAT	·	1.3 km	MPC · JPL
615256	2002 RG_{274}	—	September 4, 2002	Palomar	NEAT	·	1.1 km	MPC · JPL
615257	2002 RG_{275}	—	September 4, 2002	Palomar	NEAT	·	1.4 km	MPC · JPL
615258	2002 RE_{283}	—	October 27, 2008	Kitt Peak	Spacewatch	·	2.3 km	MPC · JPL
615259	2002 RR_{286}	—	October 5, 2002	Apache Point	SDSS Collaboration	·	1.1 km	MPC · JPL
615260	2002 RX_{286}	—	August 20, 2009	Kitt Peak	Spacewatch	·	600 m	MPC · JPL
615261	2002 RV_{288}	—	November 15, 2006	Catalina	CSS	·	1.0 km	MPC · JPL
615262	2002 RD_{289}	—	March 3, 2005	Catalina	CSS	·	3.5 km	MPC · JPL
615263	2002 RS_{291}	—	September 9, 2002	Palomar	NEAT	·	1.5 km	MPC · JPL
615264	2002 RO_{292}	—	October 22, 2008	Kitt Peak	Spacewatch	EOS	2.5 km	MPC · JPL
615265	2002 RP_{293}	—	September 3, 2002	Palomar	NEAT	·	2.4 km	MPC · JPL
615266	2002 RJ_{295}	—	October 5, 2013	Mount Lemmon	Mount Lemmon Survey	·	2.7 km	MPC · JPL
615267	2002 RB_{296}	—	March 29, 2004	Socorro	LINEAR	H	570 m	MPC · JPL
615268	2002 RX_{296}	—	September 13, 2002	Palomar	NEAT	·	1.1 km	MPC · JPL
615269	2002 RD_{297}	—	August 10, 2007	Kitt Peak	Spacewatch	·	3.0 km	MPC · JPL
615270	2002 RK_{297}	—	September 17, 2009	Catalina	CSS	·	600 m	MPC · JPL
615271	2002 RD_{299}	—	September 28, 2002	Haleakala	NEAT	·	710 m	MPC · JPL
615272	2002 RF_{299}	—	March 8, 2013	Haleakala	Pan-STARRS 1	·	1.3 km	MPC · JPL
615273	2002 SM_{3}	—	September 26, 2002	Palomar	NEAT	NYS	1.0 km	MPC · JPL
615274	2002 SR_{7}	—	September 27, 2002	Palomar	NEAT	·	720 m	MPC · JPL
615275	2002 SN_{9}	—	September 27, 2002	Palomar	NEAT	EOS	2.1 km	MPC · JPL
615276	2002 SB_{17}	—	September 17, 2002	Haleakala	NEAT	EUN	1.4 km	MPC · JPL
615277	2002 SJ_{32}	—	September 28, 2002	Haleakala	NEAT	·	1.6 km	MPC · JPL
615278	2002 SD_{42}	—	September 28, 2002	Palomar	NEAT	JUN	740 m	MPC · JPL
615279	2002 SE_{64}	—	September 27, 2002	Palomar	NEAT	HNS	1.2 km	MPC · JPL
615280	2002 SN_{66}	—	August 15, 2002	Anderson Mesa	LONEOS	·	1.5 km	MPC · JPL
615281	2002 SV_{68}	—	August 29, 2006	Kitt Peak	Spacewatch	·	1.1 km	MPC · JPL
615282	2002 SB_{69}	—	December 13, 2006	Kitt Peak	Spacewatch	·	660 m	MPC · JPL
615283	2002 SC_{71}	—	September 16, 2002	Palomar	NEAT	·	650 m	MPC · JPL
615284	2002 SS_{72}	—	September 16, 2002	Palomar	NEAT	·	610 m	MPC · JPL
615285	2002 SE_{74}	—	October 24, 2008	Kitt Peak	Spacewatch	·	2.1 km	MPC · JPL
615286	2002 SQ_{74}	—	November 22, 2006	Mount Lemmon	Mount Lemmon Survey	·	720 m	MPC · JPL
615287	2002 SY_{74}	—	August 19, 2009	La Sagra	OAM	·	800 m	MPC · JPL
615288	2002 SO_{75}	—	November 20, 2008	Mount Lemmon	Mount Lemmon Survey	EMA	2.7 km	MPC · JPL
615289	2002 TS_{80}	—	October 1, 2002	Anderson Mesa	LONEOS	·	940 m	MPC · JPL
615290	2002 TT_{81}	—	October 1, 2002	Haleakala	NEAT	·	1.8 km	MPC · JPL
615291	2002 TZ_{81}	—	October 1, 2002	Haleakala	NEAT	·	1.8 km	MPC · JPL
615292	2002 TW_{101}	—	October 4, 2002	Socorro	LINEAR	·	1.6 km	MPC · JPL
615293	2002 TF_{106}	—	October 4, 2002	Kitt Peak	Spacewatch	·	1.9 km	MPC · JPL
615294	2002 TV_{115}	—	October 3, 2002	Palomar	NEAT	·	740 m	MPC · JPL
615295	2002 TZ_{134}	—	September 28, 2002	Haleakala	NEAT	(32418)	1.6 km	MPC · JPL
615296	2002 TL_{140}	—	October 5, 2002	Palomar	NEAT	·	2.7 km	MPC · JPL
615297	2002 TG_{149}	—	October 4, 2002	Socorro	LINEAR	·	1.8 km	MPC · JPL
615298	2002 TK_{151}	—	October 5, 2002	Palomar	NEAT	·	590 m	MPC · JPL
615299	2002 TS_{152}	—	October 5, 2002	Palomar	NEAT	·	1.2 km	MPC · JPL
615300	2002 TP_{171}	—	August 16, 2002	Socorro	LINEAR	·	2.4 km	MPC · JPL

== 615301–615400 ==
back to top

Designation			Discovery			Properties		Ref
Permanent	Provisional	Named after	Date	Site	Discoverer(s)	Category	Diam.	Ref
615301	2002 TO_{173}	—	September 28, 2002	Haleakala	NEAT	·	850 m	MPC · JPL
615302	2002 TZ_{209}	—	October 7, 2002	Palomar	NEAT	·	680 m	MPC · JPL
615303	2002 TF_{215}	—	October 4, 2002	Socorro	LINEAR	·	1.5 km	MPC · JPL
615304	2002 TZ_{215}	—	July 22, 1995	Kitt Peak	Spacewatch	·	520 m	MPC · JPL
615305	2002 TK_{253}	—	October 3, 2002	Socorro	LINEAR	·	820 m	MPC · JPL
615306	2002 TA_{269}	—	October 4, 2002	Palomar	NEAT	·	1.4 km	MPC · JPL
615307	2002 TM_{269}	—	September 7, 2002	Socorro	LINEAR	JUN	1.0 km	MPC · JPL
615308	2002 TC_{271}	—	October 9, 2002	Socorro	LINEAR	·	3.3 km	MPC · JPL
615309	2002 TP_{382}	—	October 11, 2002	Palomar	NEAT	·	470 m	MPC · JPL
615310	2002 TM_{385}	—	October 15, 2002	Palomar	NEAT	·	1.4 km	MPC · JPL
615311	2002 TY_{386}	—	December 21, 2008	Kitt Peak	Spacewatch	·	1.7 km	MPC · JPL
615312	2002 TK_{389}	—	October 15, 2009	Mount Lemmon	Mount Lemmon Survey	·	860 m	MPC · JPL
615313	2002 TO_{389}	—	July 18, 2012	Catalina	CSS	·	870 m	MPC · JPL
615314	2002 TX_{389}	—	October 13, 2013	Kitt Peak	Spacewatch	·	2.1 km	MPC · JPL
615315	2002 TD_{390}	—	November 7, 2007	Kitt Peak	Spacewatch	AGN	860 m	MPC · JPL
615316	2002 TO_{391}	—	October 10, 2002	Palomar	NEAT	THB	2.5 km	MPC · JPL
615317	2002 TA_{393}	—	August 15, 2006	Siding Spring	SSS	·	1.4 km	MPC · JPL
615318	2002 TX_{393}	—	October 15, 2002	Palomar	NEAT	(5)	1 km	MPC · JPL
615319	2002 TV_{394}	—	October 5, 2002	Palomar	NEAT	EUP	3.0 km	MPC · JPL
615320	2002 UA_{4}	—	October 28, 2002	Nogales	P. R. Holvorcem, M. Schwartz	·	1.4 km	MPC · JPL
615321	2002 UY_{7}	—	October 28, 2002	Palomar	NEAT	·	2.6 km	MPC · JPL
615322	2002 UR_{12}	—	October 30, 2002	Haleakala	NEAT	T_{j} (2.68)	2.7 km	MPC · JPL
615323	2002 UG_{16}	—	October 30, 2002	Palomar	NEAT	·	3.5 km	MPC · JPL
615324	2002 UG_{26}	—	October 15, 2002	Palomar	NEAT	EOS	3.0 km	MPC · JPL
615325	2002 UY_{78}	—	July 21, 2006	Catalina	CSS	·	1.2 km	MPC · JPL
615326	2002 UK_{79}	—	October 18, 2002	Palomar	NEAT	TIR	3.0 km	MPC · JPL
615327	2002 UY_{79}	—	November 21, 2014	Haleakala	Pan-STARRS 1	·	3.3 km	MPC · JPL
615328	2002 UG_{81}	—	April 6, 2011	Mount Lemmon	Mount Lemmon Survey	·	2.4 km	MPC · JPL
615329	2002 UL_{81}	—	April 22, 2009	Mount Lemmon	Mount Lemmon Survey	H	400 m	MPC · JPL
615330	2002 UE_{82}	—	August 28, 2006	Catalina	CSS	·	840 m	MPC · JPL
615331	2002 VP_{4}	—	November 4, 2002	Palomar	NEAT	·	2.9 km	MPC · JPL
615332	2002 VC_{16}	—	October 16, 2002	Palomar	NEAT	·	930 m	MPC · JPL
615333	2002 VO_{46}	—	November 7, 2002	Socorro	LINEAR	·	1 km	MPC · JPL
615334	2002 VL_{74}	—	October 30, 2002	Palomar	NEAT	·	3.3 km	MPC · JPL
615335	2002 VP_{95}	—	October 30, 2002	Palomar	NEAT	URS	3.9 km	MPC · JPL
615336	2002 VF_{99}	—	November 13, 2002	Kitt Peak	Spacewatch	·	3.9 km	MPC · JPL
615337	2002 VG_{99}	—	November 13, 2002	Kitt Peak	Spacewatch	·	810 m	MPC · JPL
615338	2002 VC_{101}	—	October 15, 2002	Palomar	NEAT	·	1.5 km	MPC · JPL
615339	2002 VS_{114}	—	November 13, 2002	Palomar	NEAT	·	1.7 km	MPC · JPL
615340	2002 VW_{116}	—	November 6, 2002	Socorro	LINEAR	ADE	1.8 km	MPC · JPL
615341	2002 VV_{128}	—	November 4, 2002	Kitt Peak	Spacewatch	·	2.5 km	MPC · JPL
615342	2002 VW_{137}	—	November 13, 2002	Palomar	NEAT	·	700 m	MPC · JPL
615343	2002 VJ_{143}	—	November 5, 2002	Palomar	NEAT	·	920 m	MPC · JPL
615344	2002 VQ_{144}	—	November 4, 2002	Palomar	NEAT	·	1.0 km	MPC · JPL
615345	2002 VY_{146}	—	November 20, 2008	Kitt Peak	Spacewatch	·	2.0 km	MPC · JPL
615346	2002 VG_{148}	—	September 20, 2009	Mount Lemmon	Mount Lemmon Survey	ERI	1.3 km	MPC · JPL
615347	2002 VE_{149}	—	November 27, 2013	Haleakala	Pan-STARRS 1	·	2.2 km	MPC · JPL
615348	2002 VG_{149}	—	September 26, 2006	Catalina	CSS	·	1.6 km	MPC · JPL
615349	2002 VP_{150}	—	November 13, 2002	Palomar	NEAT	·	860 m	MPC · JPL
615350	2002 VS_{151}	—	April 13, 2011	Kitt Peak	Spacewatch	·	3.0 km	MPC · JPL
615351	2002 VU_{151}	—	November 15, 2002	Palomar	NEAT	VER	2.4 km	MPC · JPL
615352	2002 VT_{154}	—	January 12, 2008	Kitt Peak	Spacewatch	·	1.1 km	MPC · JPL
615353	2002 WL_{22}	—	November 24, 2002	Palomar	NEAT	·	520 m	MPC · JPL
615354	2002 WM_{25}	—	November 24, 2002	Palomar	NEAT	·	740 m	MPC · JPL
615355 Jacobkuiper	2002 WW_{29}	Jacobkuiper	November 22, 2002	Palomar	NEAT	·	1.4 km	MPC · JPL
615356	2002 WZ_{29}	—	July 29, 2005	Siding Spring	SSS	·	2.3 km	MPC · JPL
615357	2002 WY_{30}	—	November 24, 2002	Palomar	NEAT	·	860 m	MPC · JPL
615358	2002 WC_{32}	—	December 28, 2013	Kitt Peak	Spacewatch	·	850 m	MPC · JPL
615359	2002 WZ_{32}	—	May 27, 2014	Mount Lemmon	Mount Lemmon Survey	·	1.3 km	MPC · JPL
615360	2002 WA_{33}	—	August 27, 2013	Haleakala	Pan-STARRS 1	·	3.2 km	MPC · JPL
615361	2002 XN_{6}	—	December 1, 2002	Haleakala	NEAT	·	840 m	MPC · JPL
615362	2002 XX_{8}	—	December 2, 2002	Socorro	LINEAR	·	1.2 km	MPC · JPL
615363	2002 XW_{19}	—	December 2, 2002	Socorro	LINEAR	·	590 m	MPC · JPL
615364	2002 XJ_{23}	—	December 5, 2002	Socorro	LINEAR	526	2.3 km	MPC · JPL
615365	2002 XL_{39}	—	November 24, 2002	Palomar	NEAT	·	980 m	MPC · JPL
615366	2002 XD_{65}	—	December 12, 2002	Socorro	LINEAR	H	590 m	MPC · JPL
615367	2002 XE_{68}	—	December 11, 2002	Palomar	NEAT	·	920 m	MPC · JPL
615368	2002 XV_{68}	—	December 12, 2002	Socorro	LINEAR	PHO	760 m	MPC · JPL
615369	2002 XG_{121}	—	July 30, 2005	Campo Imperatore	CINEOS	V	710 m	MPC · JPL
615370	2002 XT_{121}	—	December 3, 2008	Kitt Peak	Spacewatch	·	3.9 km	MPC · JPL
615371	2002 XC_{122}	—	January 7, 2014	Mount Lemmon	Mount Lemmon Survey	·	860 m	MPC · JPL
615372	2002 XK_{122}	—	July 12, 2005	Mount Lemmon	Mount Lemmon Survey	·	770 m	MPC · JPL
615373	2002 XP_{124}	—	April 3, 2016	Haleakala	Pan-STARRS 1	·	2.6 km	MPC · JPL
615374	2002 YW_{36}	—	December 28, 2002	Kitt Peak	Spacewatch	V	660 m	MPC · JPL
615375	2002 YC_{37}	—	December 26, 2009	Kitt Peak	Spacewatch	V	550 m	MPC · JPL
615376	2003 AQ_{8}	—	December 31, 2002	Socorro	LINEAR	·	990 m	MPC · JPL
615377	2003 AE_{79}	—	January 10, 2003	Kitt Peak	Spacewatch	EUN	1.2 km	MPC · JPL
615378	2003 AK_{95}	—	February 11, 2008	Mount Lemmon	Mount Lemmon Survey	·	1.5 km	MPC · JPL
615379	2003 AQ_{95}	—	October 26, 2009	Kitt Peak	Spacewatch	·	880 m	MPC · JPL
615380	2003 BM_{3}	—	January 24, 2003	La Silla	A. Boattini, Hainaut, O.	·	1.3 km	MPC · JPL
615381	2003 BH_{5}	—	January 24, 2003	La Silla	A. Boattini, Hainaut, O.	·	1.6 km	MPC · JPL
615382	2003 BS_{9}	—	January 26, 2003	Palomar	NEAT	·	2.1 km	MPC · JPL
615383	2003 BD_{34}	—	January 27, 2003	Socorro	LINEAR	·	3.3 km	MPC · JPL
615384	2003 BK_{41}	—	January 29, 2003	Kitt Peak	Spacewatch	·	1.5 km	MPC · JPL
615385	2003 BQ_{41}	—	January 28, 2003	Socorro	LINEAR	·	1.1 km	MPC · JPL
615386	2003 BJ_{94}	—	January 28, 2003	Palomar	NEAT	H	540 m	MPC · JPL
615387	2003 BS_{94}	—	September 23, 2005	Kitt Peak	Spacewatch	V	650 m	MPC · JPL
615388	2003 BC_{95}	—	January 28, 2003	Apache Point	SDSS Collaboration	·	2.9 km	MPC · JPL
615389	2003 BT_{95}	—	February 18, 2014	Mount Lemmon	Mount Lemmon Survey	V	640 m	MPC · JPL
615390	2003 BJ_{97}	—	January 13, 2003	Kitt Peak	Spacewatch	MRX	840 m	MPC · JPL
615391	2003 BK_{97}	—	March 5, 2008	Mount Lemmon	Mount Lemmon Survey	·	1.4 km	MPC · JPL
615392	2003 BZ_{101}	—	March 26, 2007	Mount Lemmon	Mount Lemmon Survey	·	900 m	MPC · JPL
615393	2003 CX_{16}	—	February 3, 2003	Socorro	LINEAR	·	2.0 km	MPC · JPL
615394	2003 DJ_{5}	—	February 9, 2003	Haleakala	NEAT	·	1.1 km	MPC · JPL
615395	2003 DJ_{25}	—	November 2, 2010	Mount Lemmon	Mount Lemmon Survey	·	990 m	MPC · JPL
615396	2003 EW_{56}	—	March 10, 2003	Anderson Mesa	LONEOS	·	630 m	MPC · JPL
615397	2003 FB_{4}	—	March 26, 2003	Palomar	NEAT	PHO	780 m	MPC · JPL
615398	2003 FX_{124}	—	May 24, 2011	Haleakala	Pan-STARRS 1	NYS	730 m	MPC · JPL
615399	2003 FB_{135}	—	February 13, 2011	Mount Lemmon	Mount Lemmon Survey	·	730 m	MPC · JPL
615400	2003 FF_{135}	—	March 24, 2003	Kitt Peak	Spacewatch	·	930 m	MPC · JPL

== 615401–615500 ==
back to top

Designation			Discovery			Properties		Ref
Permanent	Provisional	Named after	Date	Site	Discoverer(s)	Category	Diam.	Ref
615401	2003 FJ_{135}	—	April 6, 2008	Mount Lemmon	Mount Lemmon Survey	AGN	980 m	MPC · JPL
615402	2003 FY_{135}	—	March 26, 2007	Mount Lemmon	Mount Lemmon Survey	·	830 m	MPC · JPL
615403	2003 FZ_{137}	—	October 11, 2012	Haleakala	Pan-STARRS 1	NYS	860 m	MPC · JPL
615404	2003 FM_{139}	—	May 24, 2011	Nogales	M. Schwartz, P. R. Holvorcem	·	1.1 km	MPC · JPL
615405	2003 FP_{139}	—	January 3, 2014	Kitt Peak	Spacewatch	·	900 m	MPC · JPL
615406	2003 FD_{140}	—	May 16, 2013	Mount Lemmon	Mount Lemmon Survey	·	540 m	MPC · JPL
615407	2003 FV_{141}	—	March 23, 2003	Apache Point	SDSS Collaboration	·	950 m	MPC · JPL
615408	2003 GB_{2}	—	April 1, 2003	Socorro	LINEAR	PHO	700 m	MPC · JPL
615409	2003 GQ_{61}	—	April 4, 2003	Kitt Peak	Spacewatch	·	1.1 km	MPC · JPL
615410	2003 GE_{62}	—	March 29, 2008	Kitt Peak	Spacewatch	·	1.8 km	MPC · JPL
615411	2003 GO_{62}	—	July 14, 2015	Haleakala	Pan-STARRS 1	MAS	610 m	MPC · JPL
615412	2003 GW_{62}	—	August 14, 2012	Haleakala	Pan-STARRS 1	·	970 m	MPC · JPL
615413	2003 GD_{64}	—	May 25, 2007	Mount Lemmon	Mount Lemmon Survey	·	1.2 km	MPC · JPL
615414	2003 GH_{64}	—	November 27, 2010	Mount Lemmon	Mount Lemmon Survey	·	1.8 km	MPC · JPL
615415	2003 GB_{65}	—	January 29, 2017	Haleakala	Pan-STARRS 1	·	880 m	MPC · JPL
615416	2003 GD_{65}	—	April 24, 2008	Kitt Peak	Spacewatch	·	2.1 km	MPC · JPL
615417	2003 GA_{66}	—	April 8, 2003	Kitt Peak	Spacewatch	·	960 m	MPC · JPL
615418	2003 HS_{59}	—	October 3, 2013	Haleakala	Pan-STARRS 1	·	590 m	MPC · JPL
615419	2003 HP_{60}	—	March 27, 2011	Mount Lemmon	Mount Lemmon Survey	H	370 m	MPC · JPL
615420	2003 HL_{61}	—	August 25, 2014	Haleakala	Pan-STARRS 1	AGN	990 m	MPC · JPL
615421	2003 HF_{62}	—	January 10, 2006	Mount Lemmon	Mount Lemmon Survey	MAR	890 m	MPC · JPL
615422	2003 HN_{63}	—	June 8, 2011	Mount Lemmon	Mount Lemmon Survey	·	830 m	MPC · JPL
615423	2003 HM_{64}	—	February 25, 2007	Kitt Peak	Spacewatch	·	1.8 km	MPC · JPL
615424	2003 HX_{64}	—	April 25, 2003	Kitt Peak	Spacewatch	·	890 m	MPC · JPL
615425	2003 HC_{65}	—	December 25, 2009	Kitt Peak	Spacewatch	·	860 m	MPC · JPL
615426	2003 HD_{66}	—	April 26, 2003	Kitt Peak	Spacewatch	·	490 m	MPC · JPL
615427	2003 JQ_{18}	—	January 24, 2006	Mount Lemmon	Mount Lemmon Survey	·	1.2 km	MPC · JPL
615428	2003 JV_{20}	—	May 1, 2003	Kitt Peak	Spacewatch	·	920 m	MPC · JPL
615429	2003 LS_{1}	—	May 26, 2003	Kitt Peak	Spacewatch	H	340 m	MPC · JPL
615430	2003 LM_{2}	—	June 2, 2003	Kitt Peak	Spacewatch	·	1.0 km	MPC · JPL
615431	2003 LL_{10}	—	August 31, 2011	Siding Spring	SSS	·	920 m	MPC · JPL
615432	2003 LN_{11}	—	March 23, 2012	Mount Lemmon	Mount Lemmon Survey	KOR	1.0 km	MPC · JPL
615433	2003 LO_{11}	—	September 30, 2005	Mount Lemmon	Mount Lemmon Survey	THB	1.8 km	MPC · JPL
615434	2003 NO_{13}	—	April 27, 2012	Haleakala	Pan-STARRS 1	·	1.7 km	MPC · JPL
615435	2003 NQ_{13}	—	January 1, 2008	Kitt Peak	Spacewatch	3:2	5.5 km	MPC · JPL
615436	2003 NT_{13}	—	June 20, 2013	Haleakala	Pan-STARRS 1	·	2.3 km	MPC · JPL
615437	2003 OB_{35}	—	October 24, 2013	Kitt Peak	Spacewatch	·	560 m	MPC · JPL
615438	2003 QC_{4}	—	August 18, 2003	Campo Imperatore	CINEOS	·	1.3 km	MPC · JPL
615439	2003 QN_{19}	—	August 22, 2003	Haleakala	NEAT	·	1.1 km	MPC · JPL
615440	2003 QG_{69}	—	August 23, 2003	Palomar	NEAT	·	1.7 km	MPC · JPL
615441	2003 QM_{71}	—	August 25, 2003	Palomar	NEAT	·	1.4 km	MPC · JPL
615442	2003 QM_{110}	—	August 31, 2003	Kitt Peak	Spacewatch	·	500 m	MPC · JPL
615443	2003 QJ_{112}	—	August 29, 2003	Haleakala	NEAT	·	1.3 km	MPC · JPL
615444	2003 QB_{115}	—	August 23, 2003	Palomar	NEAT	·	830 m	MPC · JPL
615445	2003 QF_{115}	—	August 27, 2003	Palomar	NEAT	JUN · fast	770 m	MPC · JPL
615446	2003 QC_{121}	—	November 3, 2010	Kitt Peak	Spacewatch	·	580 m	MPC · JPL
615447	2003 QA_{122}	—	September 12, 2007	Mount Lemmon	Mount Lemmon Survey	·	900 m	MPC · JPL
615448	2003 QX_{122}	—	October 13, 2010	Mount Lemmon	Mount Lemmon Survey	·	590 m	MPC · JPL
615449	2003 RJ_{15}	—	September 15, 2003	Haleakala	NEAT	·	1.3 km	MPC · JPL
615450	2003 SH_{9}	—	September 17, 2003	Palomar	NEAT	·	660 m	MPC · JPL
615451	2003 SS_{14}	—	August 25, 2003	Cerro Tololo	Deep Ecliptic Survey	·	520 m	MPC · JPL
615452	2003 SO_{16}	—	September 17, 2003	Kitt Peak	Spacewatch	·	840 m	MPC · JPL
615453	2003 SZ_{20}	—	September 16, 2003	Kitt Peak	Spacewatch	·	920 m	MPC · JPL
615454	2003 SA_{23}	—	September 16, 2003	Palomar	NEAT	·	1.5 km	MPC · JPL
615455	2003 SE_{44}	—	August 25, 2003	Palomar	NEAT	·	1.4 km	MPC · JPL
615456	2003 SH_{62}	—	August 31, 2003	Haleakala	NEAT	·	590 m	MPC · JPL
615457	2003 SF_{77}	—	September 18, 2003	Palomar	NEAT	·	1.3 km	MPC · JPL
615458	2003 SB_{96}	—	September 19, 2003	Palomar	NEAT	·	1.3 km	MPC · JPL
615459	2003 SD_{120}	—	September 17, 2003	Kitt Peak	Spacewatch	·	620 m	MPC · JPL
615460	2003 SC_{127}	—	September 19, 2003	Piszkéstető	K. Sárneczky, B. Sipőcz	·	3.0 km	MPC · JPL
615461	2003 SQ_{128}	—	September 20, 2003	Mount Graham	Ryan, W.	(5)	1.0 km	MPC · JPL
615462	2003 SS_{134}	—	September 18, 2003	Kitt Peak	Spacewatch	(5)	1.2 km	MPC · JPL
615463	2003 SW_{140}	—	September 19, 2003	Palomar	NEAT	·	1.4 km	MPC · JPL
615464	2003 SF_{150}	—	September 17, 2003	Socorro	LINEAR	·	1.2 km	MPC · JPL
615465	2003 SS_{150}	—	August 31, 2003	Haleakala	NEAT	·	1.7 km	MPC · JPL
615466	2003 SL_{158}	—	August 29, 2003	Haleakala	NEAT	·	1.8 km	MPC · JPL
615467	2003 SD_{161}	—	September 20, 2003	Anderson Mesa	LONEOS	·	1.3 km	MPC · JPL
615468	2003 SW_{165}	—	September 20, 2003	Palomar	NEAT	EOS	2.0 km	MPC · JPL
615469	2003 SS_{167}	—	September 22, 2003	Kitt Peak	Spacewatch	·	2.0 km	MPC · JPL
615470	2003 SL_{175}	—	September 18, 2003	Kitt Peak	Spacewatch	·	1.2 km	MPC · JPL
615471	2003 SA_{206}	—	August 22, 2003	Palomar	NEAT	·	1.1 km	MPC · JPL
615472	2003 SV_{229}	—	September 27, 2003	Kitt Peak	Spacewatch	·	1.6 km	MPC · JPL
615473	2003 SH_{234}	—	September 25, 2003	Palomar	NEAT	·	700 m	MPC · JPL
615474	2003 SK_{238}	—	September 17, 2003	Kitt Peak	Spacewatch	·	2.3 km	MPC · JPL
615475	2003 SG_{256}	—	September 28, 2003	Kitt Peak	Spacewatch	·	1.5 km	MPC · JPL
615476	2003 SQ_{274}	—	September 28, 2003	Kitt Peak	Spacewatch	·	2.6 km	MPC · JPL
615477	2003 SO_{277}	—	September 25, 2003	Palomar	NEAT	·	710 m	MPC · JPL
615478	2003 SF_{292}	—	September 30, 2003	Junk Bond	D. Healy	·	680 m	MPC · JPL
615479	2003 SD_{313}	—	September 17, 2003	Socorro	LINEAR	·	850 m	MPC · JPL
615480	2003 SV_{324}	—	September 17, 2003	Kitt Peak	Spacewatch	·	480 m	MPC · JPL
615481	2003 SC_{327}	—	September 18, 2003	Kitt Peak	Spacewatch	·	520 m	MPC · JPL
615482	2003 SX_{331}	—	October 16, 2003	Palomar	NEAT	EOS	1.9 km	MPC · JPL
615483	2003 ST_{332}	—	October 17, 2003	Kitt Peak	Spacewatch	·	1.0 km	MPC · JPL
615484	2003 SV_{354}	—	September 22, 2003	Palomar	NEAT	·	1.4 km	MPC · JPL
615485	2003 SO_{357}	—	September 20, 2003	Kitt Peak	Spacewatch	·	1.9 km	MPC · JPL
615486	2003 SO_{359}	—	September 21, 2003	Kitt Peak	Spacewatch	·	1.8 km	MPC · JPL
615487	2003 SW_{359}	—	September 21, 2003	Kitt Peak	Spacewatch	·	1.4 km	MPC · JPL
615488	2003 SF_{370}	—	September 26, 2003	Apache Point	SDSS	·	1.0 km	MPC · JPL
615489	2003 SU_{373}	—	September 26, 2003	Apache Point	SDSS Collaboration	MAS	540 m	MPC · JPL
615490	2003 SF_{376}	—	September 26, 2003	Apache Point	SDSS Collaboration	·	1.5 km	MPC · JPL
615491	2003 SU_{376}	—	October 22, 2003	Kitt Peak	Deep Ecliptic Survey	EOS	1.4 km	MPC · JPL
615492	2003 SH_{380}	—	September 26, 2003	Apache Point	SDSS Collaboration	·	890 m	MPC · JPL
615493	2003 SP_{387}	—	September 26, 2003	Apache Point	SDSS Collaboration	·	1.9 km	MPC · JPL
615494	2003 SX_{389}	—	September 26, 2003	Apache Point	SDSS	·	620 m	MPC · JPL
615495	2003 SO_{392}	—	September 26, 2003	Apache Point	SDSS Collaboration	·	3.2 km	MPC · JPL
615496	2003 SZ_{397}	—	September 26, 2003	Apache Point	SDSS	EOS	1.8 km	MPC · JPL
615497	2003 SP_{401}	—	September 26, 2003	Apache Point	SDSS Collaboration	EUN	780 m	MPC · JPL
615498	2003 SQ_{404}	—	September 27, 2003	Apache Point	SDSS Collaboration	EOS	1.7 km	MPC · JPL
615499	2003 SB_{405}	—	September 27, 2003	Apache Point	SDSS Collaboration	KON	1.9 km	MPC · JPL
615500	2003 SK_{406}	—	September 27, 2003	Apache Point	SDSS Collaboration	·	2.0 km	MPC · JPL

== 615501–615600 ==
back to top

Designation			Discovery			Properties		Ref
Permanent	Provisional	Named after	Date	Site	Discoverer(s)	Category	Diam.	Ref
615501	2003 SJ_{408}	—	September 27, 2003	Apache Point	SDSS Collaboration	·	1.6 km	MPC · JPL
615502	2003 SZ_{414}	—	September 28, 2003	Apache Point	SDSS Collaboration	·	1.5 km	MPC · JPL
615503	2003 SZ_{418}	—	September 28, 2003	Apache Point	SDSS	·	2.0 km	MPC · JPL
615504	2003 SL_{419}	—	December 20, 2004	Mount Lemmon	Mount Lemmon Survey	·	2.4 km	MPC · JPL
615505	2003 SQ_{419}	—	September 28, 2003	Apache Point	SDSS Collaboration	·	1.6 km	MPC · JPL
615506	2003 SL_{422}	—	September 26, 2003	Apache Point	SDSS Collaboration	·	870 m	MPC · JPL
615507	2003 SF_{428}	—	September 17, 2003	Anderson Mesa	LONEOS	·	1.0 km	MPC · JPL
615508	2003 SG_{433}	—	September 27, 2003	Kitt Peak	Spacewatch	·	1.8 km	MPC · JPL
615509	2003 SR_{433}	—	September 30, 2003	Kitt Peak	Spacewatch	EOS	1.7 km	MPC · JPL
615510	2003 SK_{435}	—	September 18, 2003	Palomar	NEAT	DOR	2.4 km	MPC · JPL
615511	2003 SL_{435}	—	September 19, 2003	Palomar	NEAT	·	690 m	MPC · JPL
615512	2003 SP_{435}	—	September 21, 2003	Palomar	NEAT	·	2.2 km	MPC · JPL
615513	2003 SR_{435}	—	September 22, 2003	Anderson Mesa	LONEOS	·	480 m	MPC · JPL
615514	2003 SZ_{435}	—	September 28, 2003	Anderson Mesa	LONEOS	·	600 m	MPC · JPL
615515	2003 SZ_{436}	—	September 21, 2003	Palomar	NEAT	·	2.1 km	MPC · JPL
615516	2003 SQ_{438}	—	September 21, 2009	Kitt Peak	Spacewatch	·	2.6 km	MPC · JPL
615517	2003 SW_{438}	—	October 20, 2003	Kitt Peak	Spacewatch	·	1.0 km	MPC · JPL
615518	2003 SO_{440}	—	March 24, 2012	Kitt Peak	Spacewatch	·	2.1 km	MPC · JPL
615519	2003 ST_{441}	—	March 9, 2005	Mount Lemmon	Mount Lemmon Survey	·	520 m	MPC · JPL
615520	2003 SN_{443}	—	November 11, 2013	Kitt Peak	Spacewatch	·	580 m	MPC · JPL
615521	2003 SU_{443}	—	October 7, 2013	Kitt Peak	Spacewatch	·	510 m	MPC · JPL
615522	2003 SA_{445}	—	May 4, 2009	Mount Lemmon	Mount Lemmon Survey	·	490 m	MPC · JPL
615523	2003 SR_{448}	—	February 9, 2005	Kitt Peak	Spacewatch	HNS	840 m	MPC · JPL
615524	2003 SV_{448}	—	September 19, 2003	Kitt Peak	Spacewatch	·	1.9 km	MPC · JPL
615525	2003 SF_{449}	—	September 20, 2003	Kitt Peak	Spacewatch	·	940 m	MPC · JPL
615526	2003 SX_{449}	—	November 3, 2016	Haleakala	Pan-STARRS 1	·	540 m	MPC · JPL
615527	2003 SC_{450}	—	February 24, 2015	Haleakala	Pan-STARRS 1	·	680 m	MPC · JPL
615528	2003 SL_{450}	—	July 13, 2013	Mount Lemmon	Mount Lemmon Survey	EOS	1.3 km	MPC · JPL
615529	2003 SC_{451}	—	February 3, 2016	Haleakala	Pan-STARRS 1	·	2.0 km	MPC · JPL
615530	2003 SE_{452}	—	August 9, 2013	Kitt Peak	Spacewatch	·	1.4 km	MPC · JPL
615531	2003 SZ_{452}	—	July 12, 2015	Haleakala	Pan-STARRS 1	·	1.0 km	MPC · JPL
615532	2003 SQ_{453}	—	September 18, 2003	Kitt Peak	Spacewatch	·	520 m	MPC · JPL
615533	2003 SW_{453}	—	September 28, 2003	Kitt Peak	Spacewatch	·	1.2 km	MPC · JPL
615534	2003 SG_{455}	—	April 30, 2014	Haleakala	Pan-STARRS 1	·	1.1 km	MPC · JPL
615535	2003 SP_{455}	—	March 20, 2007	Catalina	CSS	·	3.0 km	MPC · JPL
615536	2003 SR_{457}	—	September 20, 1998	Kitt Peak	Spacewatch	·	1.9 km	MPC · JPL
615537	2003 SC_{459}	—	April 27, 2012	Haleakala	Pan-STARRS 1	·	1.8 km	MPC · JPL
615538	2003 SQ_{461}	—	September 28, 2003	Kitt Peak	Spacewatch	·	350 m	MPC · JPL
615539	2003 SR_{464}	—	September 29, 2003	Kitt Peak	Spacewatch	·	1.6 km	MPC · JPL
615540	2003 SL_{465}	—	September 30, 2003	Kitt Peak	Spacewatch	·	650 m	MPC · JPL
615541	2003 SO_{465}	—	September 27, 2003	Kitt Peak	Spacewatch	·	1.4 km	MPC · JPL
615542	2003 SM_{470}	—	September 22, 2003	Kitt Peak	Spacewatch	(5)	980 m	MPC · JPL
615543	2003 TE_{3}	—	October 1, 2003	Kitt Peak	Spacewatch	·	620 m	MPC · JPL
615544	2003 TG_{12}	—	September 23, 2003	Palomar	NEAT	·	2.4 km	MPC · JPL
615545	2003 TB_{23}	—	October 1, 2003	Kitt Peak	Spacewatch	·	980 m	MPC · JPL
615546	2003 TY_{25}	—	October 1, 2003	Kitt Peak	Spacewatch	EOS	1.5 km	MPC · JPL
615547	2003 TF_{34}	—	October 1, 2003	Kitt Peak	Spacewatch	·	2.3 km	MPC · JPL
615548	2003 TD_{40}	—	October 2, 2003	Kitt Peak	Spacewatch	·	2.4 km	MPC · JPL
615549	2003 TK_{48}	—	October 3, 2003	Kitt Peak	Spacewatch	·	1.9 km	MPC · JPL
615550	2003 TC_{50}	—	October 3, 2003	Haleakala	NEAT	·	2.1 km	MPC · JPL
615551	2003 TG_{55}	—	October 5, 2003	Kitt Peak	Spacewatch	(5)	1.0 km	MPC · JPL
615552	2003 TO_{55}	—	October 5, 2003	Kitt Peak	Spacewatch	·	3.7 km	MPC · JPL
615553	2003 TJ_{56}	—	October 5, 2003	Kitt Peak	Spacewatch	·	900 m	MPC · JPL
615554	2003 TM_{60}	—	October 2, 2003	Kitt Peak	Spacewatch	DOR	2.4 km	MPC · JPL
615555	2003 TU_{60}	—	October 2, 2003	Kitt Peak	Spacewatch	·	1 km	MPC · JPL
615556	2003 TY_{61}	—	November 11, 2009	Mount Lemmon	Mount Lemmon Survey	·	2.3 km	MPC · JPL
615557	2003 TZ_{62}	—	October 2, 2003	Kitt Peak	Spacewatch	EOS	1.4 km	MPC · JPL
615558	2003 TL_{63}	—	May 14, 2009	Kitt Peak	Spacewatch	·	530 m	MPC · JPL
615559	2003 TR_{63}	—	March 30, 2015	Haleakala	Pan-STARRS 1	·	610 m	MPC · JPL
615560	2003 TT_{63}	—	October 5, 2003	Kitt Peak	Spacewatch	·	950 m	MPC · JPL
615561	2003 TW_{63}	—	February 5, 2013	Mount Lemmon	Mount Lemmon Survey	(5)	840 m	MPC · JPL
615562	2003 TW_{64}	—	October 3, 2003	Kitt Peak	Spacewatch	EOS	1.6 km	MPC · JPL
615563	2003 UR_{20}	—	July 28, 2003	Palomar	NEAT	TIN	1.1 km	MPC · JPL
615564	2003 UU_{24}	—	October 16, 2003	Kitt Peak	Spacewatch	(2076)	550 m	MPC · JPL
615565	2003 UN_{32}	—	September 19, 2003	Kitt Peak	Spacewatch	3:2 · SHU	3.6 km	MPC · JPL
615566	2003 UA_{34}	—	October 17, 2003	Kitt Peak	Spacewatch	KON	2.1 km	MPC · JPL
615567	2003 UZ_{47}	—	October 1, 2003	Kitt Peak	Spacewatch	(5)	1.4 km	MPC · JPL
615568	2003 UM_{51}	—	September 17, 2003	Palomar	NEAT	·	1.6 km	MPC · JPL
615569	2003 UM_{69}	—	September 16, 2003	Kitt Peak	Spacewatch	EOS	1.4 km	MPC · JPL
615570	2003 UR_{71}	—	October 19, 2003	Kitt Peak	Spacewatch	·	890 m	MPC · JPL
615571	2003 UK_{87}	—	October 19, 2003	Anderson Mesa	LONEOS	·	3.4 km	MPC · JPL
615572	2003 UB_{90}	—	October 20, 2003	Kitt Peak	Spacewatch	LEO	1.7 km	MPC · JPL
615573	2003 UD_{96}	—	October 18, 2003	Kitt Peak	Spacewatch	·	1.1 km	MPC · JPL
615574	2003 UV_{106}	—	October 18, 2003	Palomar	NEAT	·	640 m	MPC · JPL
615575	2003 UR_{117}	—	October 21, 2003	Kitt Peak	Spacewatch	·	1.0 km	MPC · JPL
615576	2003 UW_{123}	—	September 18, 2003	Kitt Peak	Spacewatch	·	440 m	MPC · JPL
615577	2003 UR_{130}	—	September 19, 2003	Palomar	NEAT	·	1.4 km	MPC · JPL
615578	2003 UQ_{140}	—	October 16, 2003	Palomar	NEAT	·	2.5 km	MPC · JPL
615579	2003 UP_{153}	—	October 19, 2003	Kitt Peak	Spacewatch	EOS	1.7 km	MPC · JPL
615580	2003 UH_{154}	—	October 20, 2003	Kitt Peak	Spacewatch	·	1.2 km	MPC · JPL
615581	2003 UQ_{166}	—	October 21, 2003	Kitt Peak	Spacewatch	·	640 m	MPC · JPL
615582	2003 UM_{182}	—	October 21, 2003	Kitt Peak	Spacewatch	EUN	1.0 km	MPC · JPL
615583	2003 US_{209}	—	September 28, 2003	Kitt Peak	Spacewatch	(5)	820 m	MPC · JPL
615584	2003 UT_{242}	—	October 24, 2003	Socorro	LINEAR	·	2.5 km	MPC · JPL
615585	2003 UX_{282}	—	October 21, 2003	Palomar	NEAT	·	2.8 km	MPC · JPL
615586	2003 UQ_{286}	—	September 28, 2003	Kitt Peak	Spacewatch	·	1.3 km	MPC · JPL
615587	2003 UM_{291}	—	October 27, 2003	Kitt Peak	Spacewatch	·	2.0 km	MPC · JPL
615588	2003 UN_{300}	—	October 16, 2003	Kitt Peak	Spacewatch	·	830 m	MPC · JPL
615589	2003 UE_{310}	—	September 20, 2003	Palomar	NEAT	EOS	2.1 km	MPC · JPL
615590	2003 UD_{317}	—	September 18, 2003	Kitt Peak	Spacewatch	·	850 m	MPC · JPL
615591	2003 UB_{321}	—	October 16, 2003	Kitt Peak	Spacewatch	·	1.8 km	MPC · JPL
615592	2003 UN_{326}	—	October 2, 2003	Kitt Peak	Spacewatch	·	480 m	MPC · JPL
615593	2003 UA_{327}	—	September 30, 2003	Kitt Peak	Spacewatch	·	990 m	MPC · JPL
615594	2003 UX_{337}	—	October 18, 2003	Kitt Peak	Spacewatch	·	1.7 km	MPC · JPL
615595	2003 UZ_{339}	—	October 18, 2003	Kitt Peak	Spacewatch	·	1.6 km	MPC · JPL
615596	2003 UJ_{340}	—	September 18, 2003	Kitt Peak	Spacewatch	·	1.0 km	MPC · JPL
615597	2003 UV_{340}	—	July 20, 2003	Palomar	NEAT	·	2.3 km	MPC · JPL
615598	2003 UN_{346}	—	September 29, 2003	Kitt Peak	Spacewatch	·	520 m	MPC · JPL
615599	2003 UD_{352}	—	October 19, 2003	Apache Point	SDSS Collaboration	·	2.0 km	MPC · JPL
615600	2003 UC_{357}	—	October 19, 2003	Kitt Peak	Spacewatch	·	990 m	MPC · JPL

== 615601–615700 ==
back to top

Designation			Discovery			Properties		Ref
Permanent	Provisional	Named after	Date	Site	Discoverer(s)	Category	Diam.	Ref
615601	2003 UF_{369}	—	October 21, 2003	Kitt Peak	Spacewatch	·	930 m	MPC · JPL
615602	2003 UT_{370}	—	October 21, 2003	Kitt Peak	Spacewatch	·	600 m	MPC · JPL
615603	2003 US_{375}	—	October 3, 2003	Kitt Peak	Spacewatch	·	1.3 km	MPC · JPL
615604	2003 UN_{376}	—	September 29, 2003	Kitt Peak	Spacewatch	·	980 m	MPC · JPL
615605	2003 UX_{383}	—	October 22, 2003	Apache Point	SDSS	·	1.8 km	MPC · JPL
615606	2003 UF_{386}	—	September 28, 2003	Kitt Peak	Spacewatch	H	390 m	MPC · JPL
615607	2003 UV_{389}	—	October 22, 2003	Apache Point	SDSS Collaboration	(16286)	1.4 km	MPC · JPL
615608	2003 UQ_{390}	—	October 22, 2003	Apache Point	SDSS Collaboration	·	1.4 km	MPC · JPL
615609	2003 UO_{392}	—	October 22, 2003	Apache Point	SDSS Collaboration	EOS	1.4 km	MPC · JPL
615610	2003 UA_{393}	—	October 22, 2003	Apache Point	SDSS Collaboration	EOS	1.4 km	MPC · JPL
615611	2003 UN_{398}	—	October 22, 2003	Apache Point	SDSS Collaboration	·	960 m	MPC · JPL
615612	2003 UJ_{419}	—	October 19, 2003	Anderson Mesa	LONEOS	·	620 m	MPC · JPL
615613	2003 UU_{419}	—	January 27, 2012	Mount Lemmon	Mount Lemmon Survey	·	740 m	MPC · JPL
615614	2003 UW_{420}	—	October 27, 2003	Kitt Peak	Spacewatch	EOS	2.1 km	MPC · JPL
615615	2003 UZ_{420}	—	August 29, 2006	Catalina	CSS	·	590 m	MPC · JPL
615616	2003 US_{422}	—	February 3, 2008	Kitt Peak	Spacewatch	·	600 m	MPC · JPL
615617	2003 UX_{422}	—	October 19, 2003	Kitt Peak	Spacewatch	·	590 m	MPC · JPL
615618	2003 UY_{422}	—	October 19, 2003	Apache Point	SDSS Collaboration	·	510 m	MPC · JPL
615619	2003 UE_{423}	—	September 14, 2007	Mount Lemmon	Mount Lemmon Survey	·	1.2 km	MPC · JPL
615620	2003 UK_{423}	—	May 21, 2006	Kitt Peak	Spacewatch	HNS	870 m	MPC · JPL
615621	2003 UM_{423}	—	May 15, 2012	Haleakala	Pan-STARRS 1	EOS	1.6 km	MPC · JPL
615622	2003 UQ_{423}	—	October 26, 2009	Mount Lemmon	Mount Lemmon Survey	·	3.0 km	MPC · JPL
615623	2003 UT_{423}	—	February 7, 2008	Kitt Peak	Spacewatch	·	610 m	MPC · JPL
615624	2003 UV_{423}	—	August 29, 2006	Kitt Peak	Spacewatch	·	500 m	MPC · JPL
615625	2003 UZ_{423}	—	November 8, 2010	Mount Lemmon	Mount Lemmon Survey	·	3.3 km	MPC · JPL
615626	2003 UW_{424}	—	January 15, 2009	Kitt Peak	Spacewatch	·	1.1 km	MPC · JPL
615627	2003 UD_{425}	—	November 19, 2003	Kitt Peak	Spacewatch	·	1.1 km	MPC · JPL
615628	2003 UA_{426}	—	October 9, 2007	Mount Lemmon	Mount Lemmon Survey	(5)	910 m	MPC · JPL
615629	2003 UB_{426}	—	November 24, 2003	Kitt Peak	Spacewatch	·	500 m	MPC · JPL
615630	2003 UO_{428}	—	October 25, 2003	Kitt Peak	Spacewatch	(5)	850 m	MPC · JPL
615631	2003 UQ_{428}	—	September 10, 2007	Kitt Peak	Spacewatch	·	740 m	MPC · JPL
615632	2003 UF_{429}	—	October 5, 2014	Mount Lemmon	Mount Lemmon Survey	·	2.1 km	MPC · JPL
615633	2003 UV_{429}	—	February 10, 2016	Haleakala	Pan-STARRS 1	·	2.2 km	MPC · JPL
615634	2003 UM_{432}	—	August 19, 2006	Kitt Peak	Spacewatch	·	590 m	MPC · JPL
615635	2003 UW_{432}	—	March 27, 2011	Mount Lemmon	Mount Lemmon Survey	·	2.0 km	MPC · JPL
615636	2003 UE_{433}	—	November 15, 1998	Kitt Peak	Spacewatch	·	1.8 km	MPC · JPL
615637	2003 UZ_{434}	—	September 22, 2016	Mount Lemmon	Mount Lemmon Survey	·	490 m	MPC · JPL
615638	2003 UC_{438}	—	August 19, 2006	Kitt Peak	Spacewatch	·	500 m	MPC · JPL
615639	2003 UW_{440}	—	November 18, 2003	Kitt Peak	Spacewatch	·	1.9 km	MPC · JPL
615640	2003 UG_{441}	—	November 29, 2014	Mount Lemmon	Mount Lemmon Survey	·	1.8 km	MPC · JPL
615641	2003 UL_{441}	—	February 8, 2011	Mount Lemmon	Mount Lemmon Survey	·	450 m	MPC · JPL
615642	2003 UC_{444}	—	October 17, 2003	Kitt Peak	Spacewatch	EOS	1.6 km	MPC · JPL
615643	2003 UL_{444}	—	October 27, 2003	Kitt Peak	Spacewatch	MIS	1.8 km	MPC · JPL
615644	2003 UH_{447}	—	October 29, 2003	Kitt Peak	Spacewatch	·	1.1 km	MPC · JPL
615645	2003 VB_{9}	—	October 28, 2003	Socorro	LINEAR	·	1.7 km	MPC · JPL
615646	2003 WC_{3}	—	October 22, 2003	Socorro	LINEAR	PHO	860 m	MPC · JPL
615647	2003 WG_{4}	—	November 16, 2003	Kitt Peak	Spacewatch	·	1.2 km	MPC · JPL
615648	2003 WF_{7}	—	November 18, 2003	Kitt Peak	Spacewatch	H	520 m	MPC · JPL
615649	2003 WY_{11}	—	November 18, 2003	Palomar	NEAT	·	1.4 km	MPC · JPL
615650	2003 WG_{14}	—	October 19, 2003	Kitt Peak	Spacewatch	·	540 m	MPC · JPL
615651	2003 WG_{18}	—	November 19, 2003	Palomar	NEAT	·	1.9 km	MPC · JPL
615652	2003 WG_{24}	—	January 9, 2000	Socorro	LINEAR	·	1.7 km	MPC · JPL
615653	2003 WW_{35}	—	October 17, 2003	Kitt Peak	Spacewatch	·	1.2 km	MPC · JPL
615654	2003 WC_{51}	—	November 19, 2003	Kitt Peak	Spacewatch	·	2.4 km	MPC · JPL
615655	2003 WA_{53}	—	October 20, 2003	Kitt Peak	Spacewatch	THM	2.3 km	MPC · JPL
615656	2003 WC_{53}	—	October 16, 2003	Kitt Peak	Spacewatch	EOS	1.5 km	MPC · JPL
615657	2003 WG_{65}	—	November 19, 2003	Kitt Peak	Spacewatch	·	3.2 km	MPC · JPL
615658	2003 WM_{85}	—	November 20, 2003	Kitt Peak	Spacewatch	·	2.3 km	MPC · JPL
615659	2003 WU_{90}	—	November 18, 2003	Kitt Peak	Spacewatch	·	440 m	MPC · JPL
615660	2003 WH_{105}	—	November 21, 2003	Kitt Peak	Spacewatch	·	2.2 km	MPC · JPL
615661	2003 WU_{106}	—	October 17, 2003	Kitt Peak	Spacewatch	·	2.1 km	MPC · JPL
615662	2003 WW_{143}	—	October 18, 2003	Kitt Peak	Spacewatch	·	660 m	MPC · JPL
615663	2003 WH_{152}	—	November 28, 2003	Kitt Peak	Spacewatch	·	1.3 km	MPC · JPL
615664	2003 WQ_{180}	—	November 20, 2003	Kitt Peak	Deep Ecliptic Survey	·	1.5 km	MPC · JPL
615665	2003 WX_{186}	—	October 17, 2003	Kitt Peak	Spacewatch	·	630 m	MPC · JPL
615666	2003 WH_{187}	—	November 23, 2003	Kitt Peak	Deep Ecliptic Survey	EOS	1.4 km	MPC · JPL
615667	2003 WJ_{194}	—	November 19, 2003	Kitt Peak	Spacewatch	·	590 m	MPC · JPL
615668	2003 WE_{197}	—	March 29, 2012	Kitt Peak	Spacewatch	·	600 m	MPC · JPL
615669	2003 WH_{197}	—	December 13, 2010	Kitt Peak	Spacewatch	·	650 m	MPC · JPL
615670	2003 WC_{198}	—	November 26, 2003	Kitt Peak	Spacewatch	·	2.7 km	MPC · JPL
615671	2003 WJ_{198}	—	January 12, 2011	Kitt Peak	Spacewatch	·	660 m	MPC · JPL
615672	2003 WX_{198}	—	September 24, 2008	Kitt Peak	Spacewatch	·	1.8 km	MPC · JPL
615673	2003 WG_{200}	—	May 5, 2005	Palomar	NEAT	·	1.2 km	MPC · JPL
615674	2003 WL_{200}	—	January 8, 2011	Mount Lemmon	Mount Lemmon Survey	·	700 m	MPC · JPL
615675	2003 WR_{200}	—	March 4, 2008	Mount Lemmon	Mount Lemmon Survey	·	560 m	MPC · JPL
615676	2003 WX_{200}	—	September 29, 2008	Mount Lemmon	Mount Lemmon Survey	·	3.5 km	MPC · JPL
615677	2003 WB_{202}	—	February 24, 2008	Kitt Peak	Spacewatch	·	540 m	MPC · JPL
615678	2003 WX_{202}	—	November 16, 2003	Kitt Peak	Spacewatch	·	1.2 km	MPC · JPL
615679	2003 WF_{203}	—	August 30, 2006	Anderson Mesa	LONEOS	·	490 m	MPC · JPL
615680	2003 WQ_{203}	—	October 26, 2011	Haleakala	Pan-STARRS 1	·	1.1 km	MPC · JPL
615681	2003 WU_{203}	—	February 22, 2009	Kitt Peak	Spacewatch	·	1.0 km	MPC · JPL
615682	2003 WW_{204}	—	October 1, 2008	Mount Lemmon	Mount Lemmon Survey	·	1.9 km	MPC · JPL
615683	2003 WC_{205}	—	November 29, 2014	Mount Lemmon	Mount Lemmon Survey	·	2.0 km	MPC · JPL
615684	2003 WK_{205}	—	October 27, 2008	Mount Lemmon	Mount Lemmon Survey	·	2.3 km	MPC · JPL
615685	2003 WL_{205}	—	July 14, 2013	Haleakala	Pan-STARRS 1	HYG	2.2 km	MPC · JPL
615686	2003 WS_{205}	—	September 23, 2008	Kitt Peak	Spacewatch	·	2.1 km	MPC · JPL
615687	2003 WU_{205}	—	November 20, 2003	Kitt Peak	Spacewatch	·	2.5 km	MPC · JPL
615688	2003 WN_{206}	—	December 13, 2015	Haleakala	Pan-STARRS 1	·	2.1 km	MPC · JPL
615689	2003 WW_{207}	—	October 31, 2007	Mount Lemmon	Mount Lemmon Survey	·	1.0 km	MPC · JPL
615690	2003 WX_{208}	—	January 13, 2008	Mount Lemmon	Mount Lemmon Survey	·	860 m	MPC · JPL
615691	2003 WG_{211}	—	June 19, 2014	Haleakala	Pan-STARRS 1	·	840 m	MPC · JPL
615692	2003 WW_{211}	—	January 23, 2015	Haleakala	Pan-STARRS 1	·	620 m	MPC · JPL
615693	2003 WL_{212}	—	September 17, 2013	Mount Lemmon	Mount Lemmon Survey	·	570 m	MPC · JPL
615694	2003 WA_{213}	—	October 8, 2007	Kitt Peak	Spacewatch	·	1.1 km	MPC · JPL
615695	2003 WJ_{213}	—	September 13, 2013	Mount Lemmon	Mount Lemmon Survey	·	2.1 km	MPC · JPL
615696	2003 WL_{213}	—	March 3, 2016	Mount Lemmon	Mount Lemmon Survey	·	1.7 km	MPC · JPL
615697	2003 WG_{215}	—	November 18, 2003	Kitt Peak	Spacewatch	·	560 m	MPC · JPL
615698	2003 XA_{30}	—	November 19, 2003	Kitt Peak	Spacewatch	·	2.6 km	MPC · JPL
615699	2003 XE_{44}	—	August 29, 2014	Kitt Peak	Spacewatch	EOS	2.3 km	MPC · JPL
615700	2003 XG_{44}	—	December 14, 2003	Kitt Peak	Spacewatch	·	560 m	MPC · JPL

== 615701–615800 ==
back to top

Designation			Discovery			Properties		Ref
Permanent	Provisional	Named after	Date	Site	Discoverer(s)	Category	Diam.	Ref
615701	2003 XH_{44}	—	February 17, 2013	Kitt Peak	Spacewatch	(5)	860 m	MPC · JPL
615702	2003 XR_{44}	—	July 19, 2015	Haleakala	Pan-STARRS 1	·	1.4 km	MPC · JPL
615703	2003 XW_{44}	—	November 2, 2011	Kitt Peak	Spacewatch	·	840 m	MPC · JPL
615704	2003 XS_{45}	—	October 10, 2008	Mount Lemmon	Mount Lemmon Survey	·	2.3 km	MPC · JPL
615705	2003 YJ_{6}	—	December 3, 2003	Socorro	LINEAR	·	1.5 km	MPC · JPL
615706	2003 YH_{19}	—	November 26, 2003	Kitt Peak	Spacewatch	EOS	2.2 km	MPC · JPL
615707	2003 YR_{20}	—	December 17, 2003	Kitt Peak	Spacewatch	·	1.3 km	MPC · JPL
615708	2003 YG_{38}	—	November 19, 2003	Catalina	CSS	(1547)	1.3 km	MPC · JPL
615709	2003 YL_{44}	—	December 19, 2003	Kitt Peak	Spacewatch	·	1.4 km	MPC · JPL
615710	2003 YB_{166}	—	December 17, 2003	Kitt Peak	Spacewatch	·	2.3 km	MPC · JPL
615711	2003 YU_{177}	—	December 19, 2003	Kitt Peak	Spacewatch	EUN	950 m	MPC · JPL
615712	2003 YG_{184}	—	October 6, 2008	Mount Lemmon	Mount Lemmon Survey	·	2.6 km	MPC · JPL
615713	2003 YO_{184}	—	October 24, 2014	Mount Lemmon	Mount Lemmon Survey	EOS	1.8 km	MPC · JPL
615714	2003 YQ_{184}	—	January 21, 2015	Haleakala	Pan-STARRS 1	·	670 m	MPC · JPL
615715	2003 YJ_{185}	—	November 18, 2014	Mount Lemmon	Mount Lemmon Survey	(31811)	2.1 km	MPC · JPL
615716	2003 YU_{185}	—	December 10, 2010	Kitt Peak	Spacewatch	·	520 m	MPC · JPL
615717	2003 YA_{186}	—	December 17, 2003	Kitt Peak	Spacewatch	·	1.2 km	MPC · JPL
615718	2003 YE_{186}	—	January 4, 2013	Cerro Tololo-DECam	DECam	·	1.1 km	MPC · JPL
615719	2003 YM_{187}	—	January 13, 2004	Kitt Peak	Spacewatch	THM	2.0 km	MPC · JPL
615720	2003 YA_{190}	—	September 12, 2007	Mount Lemmon	Mount Lemmon Survey	·	1.1 km	MPC · JPL
615721	2003 YD_{190}	—	December 21, 2003	Kitt Peak	Spacewatch	·	1.3 km	MPC · JPL
615722	2003 YE_{190}	—	December 29, 2003	Kitt Peak	Spacewatch	·	1.3 km	MPC · JPL
615723	2004 AV_{14}	—	January 15, 2004	Kitt Peak	Spacewatch	·	690 m	MPC · JPL
615724	2004 AZ_{22}	—	January 15, 2004	Kitt Peak	Spacewatch	HNS	900 m	MPC · JPL
615725	2004 AB_{27}	—	March 21, 2009	Mount Lemmon	Mount Lemmon Survey	·	1.1 km	MPC · JPL
615726	2004 BF_{1}	—	January 16, 2004	Kitt Peak	Spacewatch	·	490 m	MPC · JPL
615727	2004 BJ_{17}	—	January 17, 2004	Palomar	NEAT	H	590 m	MPC · JPL
615728	2004 BH_{32}	—	December 29, 2003	Kitt Peak	Spacewatch	·	650 m	MPC · JPL
615729	2004 BM_{64}	—	January 22, 2004	Socorro	LINEAR	·	2.7 km	MPC · JPL
615730	2004 BP_{75}	—	January 23, 2004	Anderson Mesa	LONEOS	HNS	1.5 km	MPC · JPL
615731	2004 BW_{94}	—	January 17, 2004	Haleakala	NEAT	·	3.0 km	MPC · JPL
615732	2004 BF_{100}	—	January 28, 2004	Kitt Peak	Spacewatch	URS	2.9 km	MPC · JPL
615733	2004 BC_{106}	—	January 16, 2004	Palomar	NEAT	·	1.7 km	MPC · JPL
615734	2004 BM_{121}	—	January 22, 2004	Socorro	LINEAR	·	2.1 km	MPC · JPL
615735	2004 BD_{127}	—	January 16, 2004	Kitt Peak	Spacewatch	MRX	730 m	MPC · JPL
615736	2004 BE_{129}	—	January 16, 2004	Kitt Peak	Spacewatch	·	1.5 km	MPC · JPL
615737	2004 BM_{129}	—	December 17, 2003	Kitt Peak	Spacewatch	(159)	3.4 km	MPC · JPL
615738	2004 BZ_{129}	—	January 16, 2004	Kitt Peak	Spacewatch	·	2.7 km	MPC · JPL
615739	2004 BC_{130}	—	January 16, 2004	Kitt Peak	Spacewatch	HNS	940 m	MPC · JPL
615740	2004 BJ_{130}	—	August 29, 2002	Kitt Peak	Spacewatch	·	1.4 km	MPC · JPL
615741	2004 BB_{131}	—	January 16, 2004	Kitt Peak	Spacewatch	V	500 m	MPC · JPL
615742	2004 BQ_{134}	—	January 18, 2004	Palomar	NEAT	HNS	1.2 km	MPC · JPL
615743	2004 BT_{135}	—	December 29, 2003	Kitt Peak	Spacewatch	MIS	2.0 km	MPC · JPL
615744	2004 BP_{137}	—	January 19, 2004	Kitt Peak	Spacewatch	THM	2.3 km	MPC · JPL
615745	2004 BF_{142}	—	January 19, 2004	Kitt Peak	Spacewatch	·	2.7 km	MPC · JPL
615746	2004 BA_{144}	—	January 19, 2004	Kitt Peak	Spacewatch	ELF	2.8 km	MPC · JPL
615747	2004 BG_{154}	—	January 28, 2004	Kitt Peak	Spacewatch	·	1.7 km	MPC · JPL
615748	2004 BQ_{165}	—	May 1, 2013	Nogales	M. Schwartz, P. R. Holvorcem	·	1.2 km	MPC · JPL
615749	2004 BS_{165}	—	October 4, 2016	Mount Lemmon	Mount Lemmon Survey	·	690 m	MPC · JPL
615750	2004 BT_{165}	—	January 28, 2004	Kitt Peak	Spacewatch	·	2.9 km	MPC · JPL
615751	2004 BY_{165}	—	October 30, 2008	Kitt Peak	Spacewatch	·	2.7 km	MPC · JPL
615752	2004 BF_{166}	—	January 27, 2004	Kitt Peak	Spacewatch	·	720 m	MPC · JPL
615753	2004 BT_{166}	—	October 27, 2017	Mount Lemmon	Mount Lemmon Survey	V	520 m	MPC · JPL
615754	2004 BX_{166}	—	September 29, 2013	Kitt Peak	Spacewatch	·	650 m	MPC · JPL
615755	2004 BU_{168}	—	January 30, 2004	Kitt Peak	Spacewatch	·	1.4 km	MPC · JPL
615756	2004 BG_{169}	—	November 20, 2008	Kitt Peak	Spacewatch	·	2.6 km	MPC · JPL
615757	2004 BM_{169}	—	January 16, 2015	Haleakala	Pan-STARRS 1	·	2.7 km	MPC · JPL
615758	2004 BU_{169}	—	November 26, 2014	Haleakala	Pan-STARRS 1	·	3.1 km	MPC · JPL
615759	2004 BB_{172}	—	May 1, 2011	Haleakala	Pan-STARRS 1	EOS	1.9 km	MPC · JPL
615760	2004 BE_{172}	—	November 19, 2008	Mount Lemmon	Mount Lemmon Survey	·	2.5 km	MPC · JPL
615761	2004 BL_{172}	—	June 20, 2015	Haleakala	Pan-STARRS 1	·	1.1 km	MPC · JPL
615762	2004 BR_{172}	—	February 8, 2015	Kitt Peak	Spacewatch	·	2.4 km	MPC · JPL
615763	2004 BN_{173}	—	January 19, 2004	Kitt Peak	Spacewatch	·	1.1 km	MPC · JPL
615764	2004 BB_{174}	—	January 30, 2004	Kitt Peak	Spacewatch	·	1.6 km	MPC · JPL
615765	2004 CC_{8}	—	February 10, 2004	Nogales	P. R. Holvorcem, M. Schwartz	·	770 m	MPC · JPL
615766	2004 CG_{16}	—	February 11, 2004	Kitt Peak	Spacewatch	·	2.7 km	MPC · JPL
615767	2004 CX_{19}	—	January 28, 2004	Kitt Peak	Spacewatch	T_{j} (2.93)	3.5 km	MPC · JPL
615768	2004 CC_{24}	—	February 12, 2004	Kitt Peak	Spacewatch	·	1.5 km	MPC · JPL
615769	2004 CC_{34}	—	February 12, 2004	Kitt Peak	Spacewatch	·	850 m	MPC · JPL
615770	2004 CE_{82}	—	February 12, 2004	Kitt Peak	Spacewatch	(1547)	1.6 km	MPC · JPL
615771	2004 CS_{125}	—	February 12, 2004	Kitt Peak	Spacewatch	·	630 m	MPC · JPL
615772	2004 CM_{126}	—	February 12, 2004	Kitt Peak	Spacewatch	·	1.6 km	MPC · JPL
615773	2004 CX_{131}	—	August 29, 2006	Kitt Peak	Spacewatch	·	1.4 km	MPC · JPL
615774	2004 CV_{132}	—	January 14, 2008	Kitt Peak	Spacewatch	·	1.4 km	MPC · JPL
615775	2004 CD_{134}	—	December 21, 2014	Haleakala	Pan-STARRS 1	VER	2.2 km	MPC · JPL
615776	2004 CQ_{134}	—	January 14, 2011	Kitt Peak	Spacewatch	·	580 m	MPC · JPL
615777	2004 CT_{135}	—	November 23, 2013	Haleakala	Pan-STARRS 1	·	2.6 km	MPC · JPL
615778	2004 CU_{135}	—	October 14, 2015	Kitt Peak	Spacewatch	·	1.2 km	MPC · JPL
615779	2004 DZ_{7}	—	February 17, 2004	Kitt Peak	Spacewatch	·	1.0 km	MPC · JPL
615780	2004 DX_{69}	—	January 31, 2004	Kitt Peak	Spacewatch	3:2 · (6124)	3.7 km	MPC · JPL
615781	2004 DC_{79}	—	February 17, 2004	Calar Alto	J. L. Ortiz, Santos-Sanz, P.	·	3.7 km	MPC · JPL
615782	2004 DC_{83}	—	March 27, 2011	Mount Lemmon	Mount Lemmon Survey	·	570 m	MPC · JPL
615783	2004 DJ_{83}	—	June 21, 2014	Mount Lemmon	Mount Lemmon Survey	·	1.5 km	MPC · JPL
615784	2004 DO_{84}	—	December 11, 2013	Mount Lemmon	Mount Lemmon Survey	·	1.8 km	MPC · JPL
615785	2004 DC_{85}	—	November 1, 2008	Kitt Peak	Spacewatch	·	2.4 km	MPC · JPL
615786	2004 DG_{86}	—	November 20, 2017	Haleakala	Pan-STARRS 1	·	630 m	MPC · JPL
615787	2004 DH_{86}	—	October 1, 1995	Kitt Peak	Spacewatch	·	2.8 km	MPC · JPL
615788	2004 DT_{86}	—	January 20, 2015	Haleakala	Pan-STARRS 1	·	1.9 km	MPC · JPL
615789	2004 DZ_{86}	—	July 10, 2018	Haleakala	Pan-STARRS 1	T_{j} (2.93)	3.0 km	MPC · JPL
615790	2004 DC_{87}	—	February 26, 2004	Kitt Peak	Deep Ecliptic Survey	·	1.2 km	MPC · JPL
615791	2004 DF_{87}	—	August 30, 2005	Kitt Peak	Spacewatch	·	740 m	MPC · JPL
615792	2004 DO_{87}	—	December 4, 2008	Kitt Peak	Spacewatch	·	2.2 km	MPC · JPL
615793	2004 DF_{88}	—	September 29, 2008	Mount Lemmon	Mount Lemmon Survey	·	2.6 km	MPC · JPL
615794	2004 DZ_{88}	—	October 26, 2013	Catalina	CSS	·	1.7 km	MPC · JPL
615795	2004 EE_{11}	—	March 15, 2004	Nogales	P. R. Holvorcem, M. Schwartz	·	1 km	MPC · JPL
615796	2004 EY_{20}	—	February 17, 2004	Socorro	LINEAR	·	1.6 km	MPC · JPL
615797	2004 EZ_{60}	—	February 19, 2004	Haleakala	NEAT	ERI	1.5 km	MPC · JPL
615798	2004 ED_{89}	—	March 14, 2004	Kitt Peak	Spacewatch	·	700 m	MPC · JPL
615799	2004 EC_{104}	—	March 15, 2004	Kitt Peak	Spacewatch	·	1.1 km	MPC · JPL
615800	2004 EH_{107}	—	March 15, 2004	Kitt Peak	Spacewatch	·	800 m	MPC · JPL

== 615801–615900 ==
back to top

Designation			Discovery			Properties		Ref
Permanent	Provisional	Named after	Date	Site	Discoverer(s)	Category	Diam.	Ref
615801	2004 EF_{109}	—	March 15, 2004	Kitt Peak	Spacewatch	·	1.2 km	MPC · JPL
615802	2004 EQ_{117}	—	March 15, 2004	Kitt Peak	Spacewatch	·	680 m	MPC · JPL
615803	2004 ET_{117}	—	February 11, 2016	Haleakala	Pan-STARRS 1	·	2.5 km	MPC · JPL
615804	2004 FJ_{5}	—	March 19, 2004	Mount Graham	Ryan, W., Martinez, C.	·	800 m	MPC · JPL
615805	2004 FY_{10}	—	March 17, 2004	Kitt Peak	Spacewatch	·	580 m	MPC · JPL
615806	2004 FJ_{16}	—	March 26, 2004	Socorro	LINEAR	·	1.3 km	MPC · JPL
615807	2004 FC_{25}	—	March 17, 2004	Kitt Peak	Spacewatch	·	670 m	MPC · JPL
615808	2004 FA_{30}	—	March 17, 2004	Palomar	NEAT	PHO	1.1 km	MPC · JPL
615809	2004 FQ_{72}	—	March 17, 2004	Kitt Peak	Spacewatch	EUN	1.1 km	MPC · JPL
615810	2004 FJ_{84}	—	December 11, 2013	Haleakala	Pan-STARRS 1	·	990 m	MPC · JPL
615811	2004 FL_{84}	—	March 18, 2004	Kitt Peak	Spacewatch	·	1.1 km	MPC · JPL
615812	2004 FQ_{89}	—	April 25, 2000	Anderson Mesa	LONEOS	·	1.4 km	MPC · JPL
615813	2004 FG_{103}	—	March 15, 2004	Kitt Peak	Spacewatch	·	2.7 km	MPC · JPL
615814	2004 FM_{120}	—	March 23, 2004	Kitt Peak	Spacewatch	·	830 m	MPC · JPL
615815	2004 FA_{123}	—	March 26, 2004	Socorro	LINEAR	·	910 m	MPC · JPL
615816	2004 FU_{123}	—	March 26, 2004	Kitt Peak	Deep Lens Survey	MRX	810 m	MPC · JPL
615817	2004 FE_{153}	—	March 17, 2004	Kitt Peak	Spacewatch	·	1.5 km	MPC · JPL
615818	2004 FF_{153}	—	March 17, 2004	Kitt Peak	Spacewatch	·	1.4 km	MPC · JPL
615819	2004 FP_{167}	—	April 18, 2007	Mount Lemmon	Mount Lemmon Survey	H	460 m	MPC · JPL
615820	2004 FS_{167}	—	September 26, 2006	Mount Lemmon	Mount Lemmon Survey	·	1.5 km	MPC · JPL
615821	2004 FT_{167}	—	March 29, 2004	Kitt Peak	Spacewatch	·	630 m	MPC · JPL
615822	2004 FT_{169}	—	February 13, 2011	Mount Lemmon	Mount Lemmon Survey	·	700 m	MPC · JPL
615823	2004 FG_{171}	—	February 26, 2011	Mount Lemmon	Mount Lemmon Survey	·	710 m	MPC · JPL
615824	2004 FY_{173}	—	September 18, 1995	Kitt Peak	Spacewatch	·	710 m	MPC · JPL
615825	2004 FD_{174}	—	November 29, 2013	Mount Lemmon	Mount Lemmon Survey	·	730 m	MPC · JPL
615826	2004 FL_{175}	—	March 27, 2004	Kitt Peak	Spacewatch	·	830 m	MPC · JPL
615827	2004 FU_{176}	—	March 7, 2016	Haleakala	Pan-STARRS 1	·	2.4 km	MPC · JPL
615828	2004 FD_{177}	—	November 21, 2008	Kitt Peak	Spacewatch	·	3.0 km	MPC · JPL
615829	2004 FP_{177}	—	January 19, 2017	Mount Lemmon	Mount Lemmon Survey	·	1.3 km	MPC · JPL
615830	2004 GD_{7}	—	April 12, 2004	Kitt Peak	Spacewatch	·	1.0 km	MPC · JPL
615831	2004 GN_{9}	—	April 12, 2004	Kitt Peak	Spacewatch	·	1.5 km	MPC · JPL
615832	2004 GF_{19}	—	April 13, 2004	Kitt Peak	Spacewatch	H	440 m	MPC · JPL
615833	2004 GE_{35}	—	April 13, 2004	Kitt Peak	Spacewatch	·	1.4 km	MPC · JPL
615834	2004 GB_{52}	—	April 13, 2004	Kitt Peak	Spacewatch	·	620 m	MPC · JPL
615835	2004 GD_{65}	—	April 13, 2004	Kitt Peak	Spacewatch	·	2.0 km	MPC · JPL
615836	2004 GO_{68}	—	April 13, 2004	Kitt Peak	Spacewatch	·	840 m	MPC · JPL
615837	2004 GL_{88}	—	October 5, 2002	Palomar	NEAT	·	1.1 km	MPC · JPL
615838	2004 GK_{90}	—	January 4, 2014	Mount Lemmon	Mount Lemmon Survey	·	2.9 km	MPC · JPL
615839	2004 GM_{90}	—	April 13, 2004	Kitt Peak	Spacewatch	·	700 m	MPC · JPL
615840	2004 GC_{91}	—	May 21, 2015	Haleakala	Pan-STARRS 1	·	760 m	MPC · JPL
615841	2004 HY_{12}	—	April 16, 2004	Kitt Peak	Spacewatch	·	1.4 km	MPC · JPL
615842	2004 HC_{66}	—	April 20, 2004	Kitt Peak	Spacewatch	·	780 m	MPC · JPL
615843	2004 HF_{81}	—	April 22, 2004	Kitt Peak	Spacewatch	·	580 m	MPC · JPL
615844	2004 HP_{81}	—	December 3, 2013	Haleakala	Pan-STARRS 1	PHO	740 m	MPC · JPL
615845	2004 JE_{10}	—	May 10, 2004	Palomar	NEAT	·	2.3 km	MPC · JPL
615846	2004 JX_{22}	—	May 11, 2004	Anderson Mesa	LONEOS	·	2.1 km	MPC · JPL
615847	2004 JW_{39}	—	May 14, 2004	Kitt Peak	Spacewatch	PHO	960 m	MPC · JPL
615848	2004 JG_{58}	—	February 25, 2011	Mount Lemmon	Mount Lemmon Survey	·	1.0 km	MPC · JPL
615849	2004 KH_{1}	—	May 19, 2004	Wrightwood	J. W. Young	·	1.3 km	MPC · JPL
615850	2004 KU_{19}	—	November 23, 2006	Mount Lemmon	Mount Lemmon Survey	(5)	1.2 km	MPC · JPL
615851	2004 KO_{20}	—	May 17, 2004	Bergisch Gladbach	W. Bickel	·	1.8 km	MPC · JPL
615852	2004 LN_{27}	—	June 13, 2004	Kitt Peak	Spacewatch	·	2.3 km	MPC · JPL
615853	2004 LY_{31}	—	June 12, 2004	Kitt Peak	Spacewatch	·	1.4 km	MPC · JPL
615854	2004 MX_{8}	—	October 19, 2010	Mount Lemmon	Mount Lemmon Survey	H	480 m	MPC · JPL
615855	2004 MF_{10}	—	August 18, 2009	Kitt Peak	Spacewatch	·	1.5 km	MPC · JPL
615856	2004 NU_{13}	—	July 11, 2004	Socorro	LINEAR	·	1.1 km	MPC · JPL
615857	2004 ON_{6}	—	July 16, 2004	Socorro	LINEAR	·	1.4 km	MPC · JPL
615858	2004 OV_{16}	—	July 25, 2004	Anderson Mesa	LONEOS	·	1.3 km	MPC · JPL
615859	2004 PQ	—	August 5, 2004	Palomar	NEAT	·	1.3 km	MPC · JPL
615860	2004 PK_{15}	—	August 7, 2004	Palomar	NEAT	·	2.7 km	MPC · JPL
615861	2004 PM_{15}	—	August 7, 2004	Palomar	NEAT	·	1.7 km	MPC · JPL
615862	2004 PX_{59}	—	August 9, 2004	Anderson Mesa	LONEOS	·	2.5 km	MPC · JPL
615863	2004 PV_{87}	—	August 11, 2004	Socorro	LINEAR	·	2.0 km	MPC · JPL
615864	2004 PD_{95}	—	August 12, 2004	Socorro	LINEAR	·	980 m	MPC · JPL
615865	2004 PU_{118}	—	April 14, 2008	Mount Lemmon	Mount Lemmon Survey	AEO	880 m	MPC · JPL
615866	2004 PP_{119}	—	September 9, 2008	Mount Lemmon	Mount Lemmon Survey	PHO	720 m	MPC · JPL
615867	2004 PW_{119}	—	October 25, 2008	Catalina	CSS	·	990 m	MPC · JPL
615868	2004 PX_{119}	—	October 31, 2005	Kitt Peak	Spacewatch	·	1.9 km	MPC · JPL
615869	2004 PF_{120}	—	October 28, 2014	Haleakala	Pan-STARRS 1	·	1.8 km	MPC · JPL
615870	2004 PH_{121}	—	July 16, 2004	Cerro Tololo	Deep Ecliptic Survey	MAS	570 m	MPC · JPL
615871	2004 QS_{8}	—	April 28, 2003	Kitt Peak	Spacewatch	·	3.5 km	MPC · JPL
615872	2004 QP_{20}	—	August 20, 2004	Kitt Peak	Spacewatch	AGN	1.3 km	MPC · JPL
615873	2004 QE_{32}	—	August 21, 2008	Kitt Peak	Spacewatch	·	1.0 km	MPC · JPL
615874	2004 QR_{32}	—	July 16, 2004	Siding Spring	SSS	PHO	1.0 km	MPC · JPL
615875	2004 QR_{33}	—	August 22, 2004	Kitt Peak	Spacewatch	·	1.8 km	MPC · JPL
615876	2004 QZ_{34}	—	September 8, 2016	Haleakala	Pan-STARRS 1	·	4.0 km	MPC · JPL
615877	2004 RF_{31}	—	September 7, 2004	Socorro	LINEAR	·	1.6 km	MPC · JPL
615878	2004 RV_{46}	—	September 8, 2004	Socorro	LINEAR	MAS	690 m	MPC · JPL
615879	2004 RN_{61}	—	September 8, 2004	Socorro	LINEAR	·	1.0 km	MPC · JPL
615880	2004 RP_{85}	—	September 7, 2004	Kitt Peak	Spacewatch	KOR	1.2 km	MPC · JPL
615881	2004 RR_{96}	—	August 22, 2004	Kitt Peak	Spacewatch	·	1.1 km	MPC · JPL
615882	2004 RQ_{98}	—	August 16, 2004	Stony Ridge	S. Singer-Brewster	PHO	900 m	MPC · JPL
615883	2004 RR_{124}	—	September 7, 2004	Kitt Peak	Spacewatch	·	870 m	MPC · JPL
615884	2004 RC_{134}	—	September 7, 2004	Kitt Peak	Spacewatch	KOR	1.3 km	MPC · JPL
615885	2004 RJ_{202}	—	September 28, 2001	Palomar	NEAT	·	740 m	MPC · JPL
615886	2004 RH_{212}	—	September 11, 2004	Socorro	LINEAR	·	1.5 km	MPC · JPL
615887	2004 RF_{241}	—	September 10, 2004	Kitt Peak	Spacewatch	MAS	720 m	MPC · JPL
615888	2004 RS_{242}	—	September 10, 2004	Kitt Peak	Spacewatch	MAS	560 m	MPC · JPL
615889	2004 RH_{256}	—	September 7, 2004	Kitt Peak	Spacewatch	·	820 m	MPC · JPL
615890	2004 RB_{258}	—	September 10, 2004	Socorro	LINEAR	·	1.1 km	MPC · JPL
615891	2004 RW_{258}	—	September 10, 2004	Kitt Peak	Spacewatch	NYS	780 m	MPC · JPL
615892	2004 RB_{261}	—	September 10, 2004	Kitt Peak	Spacewatch	KOR	1.2 km	MPC · JPL
615893	2004 RC_{262}	—	September 10, 2004	Kitt Peak	Spacewatch	KOR	1.1 km	MPC · JPL
615894	2004 RQ_{268}	—	September 11, 2004	Kitt Peak	Spacewatch	KOR	1.0 km	MPC · JPL
615895	2004 RR_{269}	—	September 11, 2004	Kitt Peak	Spacewatch	KOR	1.1 km	MPC · JPL
615896	2004 RW_{269}	—	September 11, 2004	Kitt Peak	Spacewatch	MAS	650 m	MPC · JPL
615897	2004 RZ_{280}	—	September 15, 2004	Kitt Peak	Spacewatch	KOR	1.1 km	MPC · JPL
615898	2004 RW_{283}	—	September 15, 2004	Kitt Peak	Spacewatch	EOS	1.9 km	MPC · JPL
615899	2004 RS_{288}	—	March 20, 2002	Kitt Peak	Deep Ecliptic Survey	KOR	1.2 km	MPC · JPL
615900	2004 RG_{299}	—	September 11, 2004	Kitt Peak	Spacewatch	·	1.9 km	MPC · JPL

== 615901–616000 ==
back to top

Designation			Discovery			Properties		Ref
Permanent	Provisional	Named after	Date	Site	Discoverer(s)	Category	Diam.	Ref
615901	2004 RM_{302}	—	September 11, 2004	Kitt Peak	Spacewatch	CLA	1.3 km	MPC · JPL
615902	2004 RU_{329}	—	September 15, 2004	Siding Spring	SSS	H	570 m	MPC · JPL
615903	2004 RD_{340}	—	September 12, 2004	Kitt Peak	Spacewatch	DOR	2.0 km	MPC · JPL
615904	2004 RR_{342}	—	August 20, 2004	Catalina	CSS	·	1.2 km	MPC · JPL
615905	2004 RY_{357}	—	September 15, 2012	Kitt Peak	Spacewatch	·	1.3 km	MPC · JPL
615906	2004 RH_{358}	—	August 3, 2000	Kitt Peak	Spacewatch	MAS	830 m	MPC · JPL
615907	2004 RV_{358}	—	March 16, 2012	Haleakala	Pan-STARRS 1	·	2.4 km	MPC · JPL
615908	2004 RY_{358}	—	September 20, 2008	Kitt Peak	Spacewatch	·	1.2 km	MPC · JPL
615909	2004 RW_{359}	—	October 6, 2008	Mount Lemmon	Mount Lemmon Survey	·	950 m	MPC · JPL
615910	2004 RK_{361}	—	September 20, 2009	Kitt Peak	Spacewatch	·	1.6 km	MPC · JPL
615911	2004 RN_{361}	—	August 17, 2009	Kitt Peak	Spacewatch	·	1.6 km	MPC · JPL
615912	2004 RF_{362}	—	June 25, 2015	Haleakala	Pan-STARRS 1	·	1.1 km	MPC · JPL
615913	2004 RJ_{362}	—	April 27, 2011	Kitt Peak	Spacewatch	·	980 m	MPC · JPL
615914 Sziszferenc	2004 SZ_{2}	Sziszferenc	September 17, 2004	Piszkéstető	K. Sárneczky	H	560 m	MPC · JPL
615915	2004 SX_{4}	—	September 4, 2004	Palomar	NEAT	H	710 m	MPC · JPL
615916	2004 SY_{6}	—	September 17, 2004	Kitt Peak	Spacewatch	MAS	570 m	MPC · JPL
615917	2004 SA_{11}	—	August 21, 2004	Siding Spring	SSS	·	2.0 km	MPC · JPL
615918	2004 SM_{16}	—	September 17, 2004	Anderson Mesa	LONEOS	·	1.0 km	MPC · JPL
615919	2004 SA_{24}	—	September 17, 2004	Kitt Peak	Spacewatch	·	560 m	MPC · JPL
615920	2004 SX_{24}	—	September 21, 2004	Kitt Peak	Spacewatch	NYS	960 m	MPC · JPL
615921	2004 SG_{27}	—	September 16, 2004	Kitt Peak	Spacewatch	MAS	540 m	MPC · JPL
615922	2004 SH_{27}	—	September 16, 2004	Kitt Peak	Spacewatch	·	1.0 km	MPC · JPL
615923	2004 SZ_{29}	—	September 9, 2004	Socorro	LINEAR	·	1.5 km	MPC · JPL
615924	2004 SS_{43}	—	September 18, 2004	Socorro	LINEAR	·	1.0 km	MPC · JPL
615925	2004 SS_{64}	—	September 6, 2008	Mount Lemmon	Mount Lemmon Survey	·	1.1 km	MPC · JPL
615926	2004 TK_{15}	—	October 4, 2004	Kitt Peak	Spacewatch	·	2.1 km	MPC · JPL
615927	2004 TF_{84}	—	October 5, 2004	Kitt Peak	Spacewatch	·	1.8 km	MPC · JPL
615928	2004 TE_{89}	—	October 5, 2004	Kitt Peak	Spacewatch	·	1.0 km	MPC · JPL
615929	2004 TS_{104}	—	October 7, 2004	Kitt Peak	Spacewatch	·	1.3 km	MPC · JPL
615930	2004 TC_{129}	—	October 23, 1997	Kitt Peak	Spacewatch	·	890 m	MPC · JPL
615931	2004 TX_{139}	—	October 5, 2004	Kitt Peak	Spacewatch	MAS	630 m	MPC · JPL
615932	2004 TM_{152}	—	September 22, 2004	Kitt Peak	Spacewatch	KOR	1.3 km	MPC · JPL
615933	2004 TA_{155}	—	October 6, 2004	Kitt Peak	Spacewatch	·	810 m	MPC · JPL
615934	2004 TB_{155}	—	October 6, 2004	Kitt Peak	Spacewatch	·	1.0 km	MPC · JPL
615935	2004 TC_{163}	—	October 6, 2004	Kitt Peak	Spacewatch	MAS	590 m	MPC · JPL
615936	2004 TT_{165}	—	October 7, 2004	Kitt Peak	Spacewatch	·	800 m	MPC · JPL
615937	2004 TR_{174}	—	October 9, 2004	Socorro	LINEAR	PHO	880 m	MPC · JPL
615938	2004 TS_{184}	—	November 18, 2001	Kitt Peak	Spacewatch	·	470 m	MPC · JPL
615939	2004 TB_{215}	—	October 9, 2004	Kitt Peak	Spacewatch	·	700 m	MPC · JPL
615940	2004 TA_{225}	—	October 8, 2004	Kitt Peak	Spacewatch	NYS	890 m	MPC · JPL
615941	2004 TR_{225}	—	October 8, 2004	Kitt Peak	Spacewatch	·	790 m	MPC · JPL
615942	2004 TU_{226}	—	October 8, 2004	Kitt Peak	Spacewatch	H	410 m	MPC · JPL
615943	2004 TY_{232}	—	October 8, 2004	Kitt Peak	Spacewatch	·	890 m	MPC · JPL
615944	2004 TW_{244}	—	October 7, 2004	Kitt Peak	Spacewatch	·	1.2 km	MPC · JPL
615945	2004 TN_{269}	—	October 9, 2004	Kitt Peak	Spacewatch	·	1.7 km	MPC · JPL
615946	2004 TZ_{278}	—	October 9, 2004	Kitt Peak	Spacewatch	·	1.2 km	MPC · JPL
615947	2004 TU_{281}	—	October 11, 2004	Kitt Peak	Spacewatch	·	620 m	MPC · JPL
615948	2004 TX_{290}	—	October 10, 2004	Kitt Peak	Spacewatch	KOR	1.3 km	MPC · JPL
615949	2004 TY_{300}	—	October 8, 2004	Kitt Peak	Spacewatch	·	1.4 km	MPC · JPL
615950	2004 TA_{309}	—	October 10, 2004	Kitt Peak	Spacewatch	·	820 m	MPC · JPL
615951	2004 TA_{327}	—	October 14, 2004	Palomar	NEAT	PHO	1.2 km	MPC · JPL
615952	2004 TH_{333}	—	October 9, 2004	Kitt Peak	Spacewatch	NYS	830 m	MPC · JPL
615953	2004 TT_{354}	—	October 15, 2004	Mount Lemmon	Mount Lemmon Survey	·	2.2 km	MPC · JPL
615954	2004 TH_{372}	—	December 31, 2005	Kitt Peak	Spacewatch	·	1.1 km	MPC · JPL
615955	2004 TO_{376}	—	October 7, 2004	Kitt Peak	Spacewatch	·	460 m	MPC · JPL
615956	2004 TS_{376}	—	October 23, 2008	Mount Lemmon	Mount Lemmon Survey	NYS	890 m	MPC · JPL
615957	2004 TA_{379}	—	January 23, 2006	Kitt Peak	Spacewatch	·	960 m	MPC · JPL
615958	2004 TT_{379}	—	September 12, 2009	Kitt Peak	Spacewatch	·	1.8 km	MPC · JPL
615959	2004 TN_{383}	—	March 13, 2013	Mount Lemmon	Mount Lemmon Survey	·	670 m	MPC · JPL
615960	2004 TE_{384}	—	October 17, 2014	Kitt Peak	Spacewatch	·	1.5 km	MPC · JPL
615961	2004 VS_{31}	—	November 3, 2004	Kitt Peak	Spacewatch	·	2.1 km	MPC · JPL
615962	2004 VV_{36}	—	November 4, 2004	Kitt Peak	Spacewatch	H	350 m	MPC · JPL
615963	2004 VS_{49}	—	November 4, 2004	Kitt Peak	Spacewatch	·	660 m	MPC · JPL
615964	2004 VJ_{67}	—	November 10, 2004	Kitt Peak	Spacewatch	·	1.6 km	MPC · JPL
615965	2004 VO_{83}	—	November 10, 2004	Kitt Peak	Spacewatch	PAD	1.1 km	MPC · JPL
615966	2004 VQ_{89}	—	November 11, 2004	Kitt Peak	Spacewatch	·	950 m	MPC · JPL
615967	2004 VM_{110}	—	November 9, 2004	Mauna Kea	Veillet, C.	·	870 m	MPC · JPL
615968	2004 VS_{132}	—	September 22, 2008	Kitt Peak	Spacewatch	·	630 m	MPC · JPL
615969	2004 VW_{133}	—	October 21, 2008	Mount Lemmon	Mount Lemmon Survey	·	1.2 km	MPC · JPL
615970	2004 VD_{134}	—	September 17, 2013	Mount Lemmon	Mount Lemmon Survey	·	1.6 km	MPC · JPL
615971	2004 WW_{5}	—	October 15, 2004	Mount Lemmon	Mount Lemmon Survey	·	1.4 km	MPC · JPL
615972	2004 XB_{14}	—	December 9, 2004	Kitt Peak	Spacewatch	·	1.4 km	MPC · JPL
615973	2004 XC_{48}	—	December 9, 2004	Kitt Peak	Spacewatch	·	1.3 km	MPC · JPL
615974	2004 XX_{51}	—	December 12, 2004	Campo Imperatore	CINEOS	·	820 m	MPC · JPL
615975	2004 XL_{125}	—	December 11, 2004	Catalina	CSS	·	2.4 km	MPC · JPL
615976	2004 XZ_{125}	—	December 11, 2004	Catalina	CSS	EUN	1.4 km	MPC · JPL
615977	2004 XV_{139}	—	December 13, 2004	Kitt Peak	Spacewatch	·	1.4 km	MPC · JPL
615978	2004 XL_{153}	—	December 15, 2004	Kitt Peak	Spacewatch	AEO	820 m	MPC · JPL
615979	2004 XW_{194}	—	February 21, 2012	Mount Lemmon	Mount Lemmon Survey	·	580 m	MPC · JPL
615980	2004 XD_{196}	—	December 3, 2004	Kitt Peak	Spacewatch	·	770 m	MPC · JPL
615981	2004 XO_{196}	—	October 29, 2017	Haleakala	Pan-STARRS 1	H	550 m	MPC · JPL
615982	2004 XU_{196}	—	January 16, 2009	Mount Lemmon	Mount Lemmon Survey	·	1.2 km	MPC · JPL
615983	2004 XQ_{197}	—	October 20, 2012	Mount Lemmon	Mount Lemmon Survey	·	570 m	MPC · JPL
615984	2004 XA_{198}	—	December 2, 2008	Kitt Peak	Spacewatch	·	870 m	MPC · JPL
615985	2004 XR_{198}	—	December 11, 2004	Kitt Peak	Spacewatch	·	1.1 km	MPC · JPL
615986	2004 YA_{7}	—	November 4, 2004	Kitt Peak	Spacewatch	·	550 m	MPC · JPL
615987	2004 YL_{28}	—	November 11, 2004	Kitt Peak	Spacewatch	·	550 m	MPC · JPL
615988	2004 YV_{39}	—	December 18, 2004	Mount Lemmon	Mount Lemmon Survey	T_{j} (2.99) · 3:2	4.4 km	MPC · JPL
615989	2004 YK_{40}	—	November 18, 2014	Mount Lemmon	Mount Lemmon Survey	·	570 m	MPC · JPL
615990	2004 YT_{41}	—	December 20, 2004	Mount Lemmon	Mount Lemmon Survey	·	1 km	MPC · JPL
615991	2005 AT_{21}	—	January 6, 2005	Catalina	CSS	·	1.4 km	MPC · JPL
615992	2005 AP_{44}	—	January 15, 2005	Kitt Peak	Spacewatch	·	540 m	MPC · JPL
615993	2005 AA_{49}	—	January 13, 2005	Kitt Peak	Spacewatch	EOS	1.7 km	MPC · JPL
615994	2005 AN_{59}	—	January 15, 2005	Kitt Peak	Spacewatch	·	2.0 km	MPC · JPL
615995	2005 AL_{63}	—	January 13, 2005	Kitt Peak	Spacewatch	·	1.6 km	MPC · JPL
615996	2005 AN_{80}	—	January 15, 2005	Kitt Peak	Spacewatch	·	2.6 km	MPC · JPL
615997	2005 AW_{83}	—	October 31, 2013	Mount Lemmon	Mount Lemmon Survey	·	670 m	MPC · JPL
615998	2005 AD_{84}	—	April 28, 2011	Haleakala	Pan-STARRS 1	·	2.1 km	MPC · JPL
615999	2005 AN_{84}	—	December 22, 2008	Kitt Peak	Spacewatch	·	1 km	MPC · JPL
616000	2005 BO_{8}	—	January 7, 2005	Socorro	LINEAR	·	1.2 km	MPC · JPL

back to top

== Meaning of names ==
As minor planet discoveries are confirmed, they are given a permanent number by the IAU's Minor Planet Center (MPC), and the discoverers can then submit names for them, following the IAU's naming conventions. The list below concerns those minor planets in the specified number-range that have received names, and explains the meanings of those names.

Official naming citations of newly named small Solar System bodies are approved and published in a bulletin by IAU's Working Group for Small Bodies Nomenclature (WGSBN). Before May 2021, citations were published in MPC's Minor Planet Circulars for many decades. Recent citations can also be found on the JPL Small-Body Database (SBDB). Until his death in 2016, German astronomer Lutz D. Schmadel compiled these citations into the Dictionary of Minor Planet Names (DMP) and regularly updated the collection.

Based on Paul Herget's The Names of the Minor Planets, Schmadel also researched the unclear origin of numerous asteroids, most of which had been named prior to World War II. This article incorporates text from this source, which is in the public domain: SBDB New namings may only be added to this list below after official publication as the preannouncement of names is condemned. The WGSBN publishes a comprehensive guideline for the naming rules of non-cometary small Solar System bodies.

Named minor planet	Provisional	This minor planet was named for...	Ref · Catalog
615214 Molnárkristian	2002 QY_{132}	Kristian Molnár (b. 1976), a Slovak amateur astronomer.	IAU · 615214
615355 Jacobkuiper	2002 WW_{29}	Jacob Kuiper (b. 1956), a Dutch meteorologist.	IAU · 615355
615914 Sziszferenc	2004 SZ_{2}	Ferenc Szisz, Hungarian-born French mechanical engineer, inventor, and the winner of the first Grand Prix motor racing event on 1906 June 26.	IAU · 615914
