= 104P/Kowal =

Jupiter-family comet

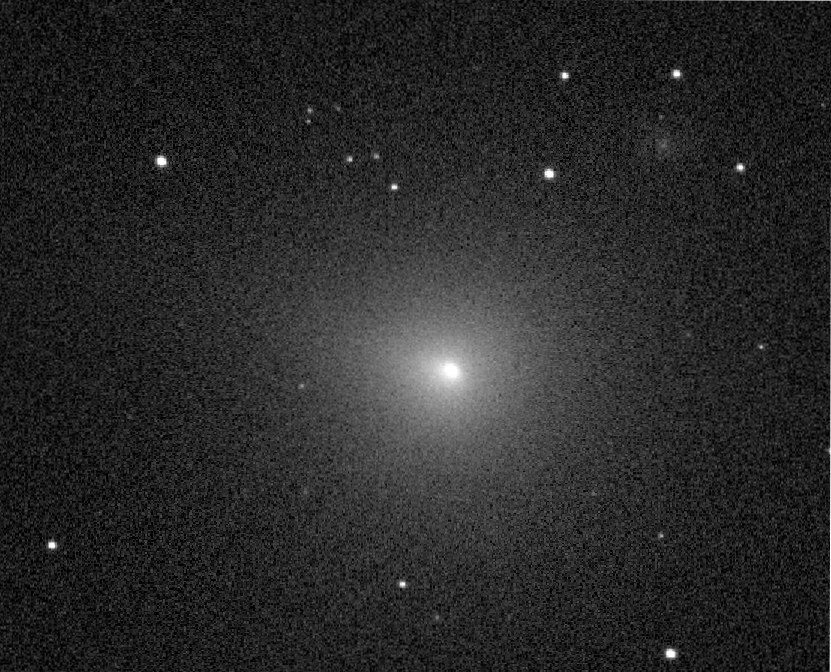
- Comet Kowal 2 photographed from the Zwicky Transient Facility on 12 February 2022

Discovery
- Discovered by: Charles T. Kowal
- Discovery date: 13 January 1979

Designations
- MPC designation: P/1979 B1, P/1991 X1
- Alternative designations: Kowal 2; 1979 II, 1991 XX; 1979a, 1991f1

Orbital characteristics
- Epoch: November 21, 2025
- Observation arc: 49.42 years (Note: Observation arc from the Minor Planet Center database only covered dates from 27 January 1979 until 12 June 2022 (43.37 years). This figure included its entire arc up to 11 January 1973.)
- Earliest precovery date: 11 January 1973
- Number of observations: 2,241
- Aphelion: 5.345 AU
- Perihelion: 1.072 AU
- Semi-major axis: 3.209 AU
- Eccentricity: 0.6659
- Orbital period: 5.75 yr
- Inclination: 5.70°
- Longitude of ascending node: 207.2°
- Argument of periapsis: 227.3°
- Mean anomaly: 241.5
- Last perihelion: 11 January 2022
- Next perihelion: 12 October 2027
- T_{Jupiter}: 2.789
- Earth MOID: 0.111 AU (16.6 million km)
- Jupiter MOID: 0.288 AU (43.1 million km)

Physical characteristics
- Dimensions: 2.0±1.0 km
- Comet total magnitude (M1): 10.5

104P/Kowal, also known as Kowal 2, is a periodic Jupiter-family comet discovered by Charles T. Kowal in 1979. The orbit was confirmed after new sightings in 1991 and 1998.

By July 2027, the comet should be around apparent magnitude 14. At the perihelion passage on 12 October 2027 the solar elongation will be 66 degrees at a magnitude of approximately 11, The comet should be observable with small telescopes.

== Observational history ==
In 2003, Gary Kronk and Brian Marsden noticed that an object observed by Leo Boethin in 1973 was actually 104P/Kowal. From Boethin's report, it was apparent that comet Kowal 2 had been in a short, major outburst to apparent magnitude 9.5 in 1973.

During the 1997–98 apparition, the comet was brighter than expected, reaching an apparent magnitude of 13 in mid January. The comet wasn't observed during the 2010 apparition. During the 2022 apparition, it brightened to a magnitude of 9.2 according to Chris Wyatt.

== Orbit ==
104P/Kowal closest Jupiter approach around 1924-May-04
Date of closest approach	Jupiter distance (AU)	Sun distance (AU)	Velocity wrt Jupiter (km/s)	Velocity wrt Sun (km/s)	Uncertainty region (3-sigma)	Reference
1924-May-04 ± 3 days	0.005 AU (750 thousand km; 460 thousand mi)	5.32 AU (796 million km; 495 million mi)	19.6	21.9	± 800000 km	Horizons

The comet was in an orbit with a perihelion distance of 1.50 AU and an orbital period of 6.38 years until an approach to Jupiter on 15 January 1996 reduced both to 1.40 AU and 6.18 years respectively. A further encounter with Jupiter on 4 July 2007 at a distance of 0.300 AU reduced the perihelion distance to 1.18 AU and the orbital period to 5.90 years. One more close approach to Jupiter on 30 May 2019 reduced the perihelion distance to 1.07 AU and orbital period to 5.74 years.

== Notes ==
Numbered comets
Previous; 103P/Hartley	104P/Kowal	Next; 105P/Singer Brewster
