= (15700) 1987 QD =

Mars-crossing asteroid

Discovery
- Discovered by: S. Singer-Brewster
- Discovery site: Palomar Obs.
- Discovery date: 24 August 1987

Designations
- Alternative designations: 2000 JD_{1}
- Minor planet category: Mars-crosser binary

Orbital characteristics
- Epoch 23 March 2018 (JD 2458200.5)
- Uncertainty parameter 0
- Observation arc: 63.65 yr (23,249 d)
- Aphelion: 2.9047 AU
- Perihelion: 1.5136 AU
- Semi-major axis: 2.2092 AU
- Eccentricity: 0.3148
- Orbital period (sidereal): 3.28 yr (1,199 d)
- Mean anomaly: 132.51°
- Mean motion: 0° 18^{m} 0.72^{s} / day
- Inclination: 26.788°
- Longitude of ascending node: 175.47°
- Argument of perihelion: 119.47°
- Known satellites: 1 (strong candidate)
- Earth MOID: 0.6219 AU (242 LD)

Physical characteristics
- Mean diameter: 2.95±0.29 km 3.04 km (derived)
- Synodic rotation period: 3.0586±0.0001 h (Note: Lightcurve plot of (15700) 1987 QD from Ondrejov data obtained by the NEO Photometric Program and collaborating projects. Period 3.0586±0.0001 hours with a brightness amplitude of 0.07±0.01 mag. Quality code is 3. Summary figures at the LCDB and Pravec, P.; Wolf, M.; Sarounova, L. (2010) (data sheet).)
- Geometric albedo: 0.20 (assumed); 0.268±0.054
- Spectral type: X (Pan-STARRS); X (SDSS-MOC); S
- Absolute magnitude (H): 14.50±0.07 (R); 14.70; 14.99±0.086

(15700) 1987 QD is a Mars-crossing asteroid and a binary candidate from inside the innermost region of the asteroid belt, approximately 3 kilometers (1.9 miles) in diameter. It was discovered on 24 August 1987, by American astronomer Stephen Singer-Brewster at the Palomar Observatory in California. The likely spherical X-type asteroid has a rotation period of 3.1 hours. The suspected presence of a kilometer-sized minor-planet moon was announced in November 2000.

== Orbit and classification ==
1987 QD is a Mars-crossing asteroid, a member of the dynamically unstable group, located between the main belt and near-Earth populations, and crossing the orbit of Mars at 1.666 AU. It orbits the Sun inside the innermost region of the asteroid belt at a distance 1.5–2.9 AU once every 3 years and 3 months (1,199 days; semi-major axis of 2.21 AU). Its orbit has an eccentricity of 0.31 and an inclination of 27° with respect to the ecliptic.

The body's observation arc begins with a precovery published by the Digitized Sky Survey and taken at Palomar in May 1954, more than 33 years prior to its official discovery observation. It will pass 6,352,000 km (0.04246 AU) from the main-belt asteroid 7 Iris on 3 September 2173.

== Numbering and naming ==
This minor planet was numbered by the Minor Planet Center on 26 July 2000 (M.P.C. 40991). As of 2018, it has not been named.

== Physical characteristics ==
In the SDSS-based taxonomy and according to the survey conducted by Pan-STARRS, 1987 QD is an X-type asteroid. It has also been classified as a common, stony S-type asteroid.

=== Rotation period ===
In September 2010, a first rotational lightcurve of 1987 QD was obtained from photometric observations by Brian Skiff. Lightcurve analysis gave a rotation period of 3.068 hours and a brightness variation of 0.07 magnitude (U=3-). (Note: Skiff (2011) web: rotation period 3.068±0.003 hours with a brightness amplitude of mag. Quality code is 3-. Summary figures at the LCDB) Within less than two weeks, follow-up observations by a large international collaboration of astronomers determined a refined period of 3.0586±0.0001 hours with a low amplitude of 0.07 magnitude, indicating that the body has a spherical shape (U=3). An alternative observation that gave a tentative period 9.709 hours received a poor quality rating (U=1).

=== Strong binary candidate ===
The photometric observations during September and October 2010 revealed that 1987 QD is a candidate for a synchronous binary asteroid with a minor-planet moon orbiting it every 50.3±0.5 hours at an estimated average distance of 14 km. The findings were announced on 6 November 2009. The lightcurve indicated mutual occultation events, however, a conclusive solution for the orbit period was not obtained. (Note: There are two possible orbital periods for the secondary: 50.3 and 62.9 hours. Neither could be conclusively established. LCDB) The Johnston's archive estimates a diameter of 1.23 kilometer for the satellite, or 31% the size of its primary.

The international collaboration included Richard Durkee at the Shed of Science Observatory (H39), Petr Pravec, Kamil Hornoch and Peter Kušnirák at Ondřejov Observatory, Donald Pray at Carbuncle Hill Observatory (912), David Higgins at Canberra (E14), Jozef Világi and Štefan Gajdoš at Modra Observatory, Judit Györgyey Ries at McDonald Observatory and Julian Oey at Leura Observatory (E17), as well as astronomers at the Kharkiv Kharkov (101), Simeiz and Skalnate Pleso observatories.

=== Diameter and albedo ===
According to the survey carried out by the NEOWISE mission of NASA's Wide-field Infrared Survey Explorer, 1987 QD measures 2.95 kilometers in diameter and its surface has an albedo of 0.268, while the Collaborative Asteroid Lightcurve Link assumes a standard albedo for a stony asteroid of 0.20 and derives a diameter of 3.04 kilometers based on an absolute magnitude of 14.99.
