= 105P/Singer Brewster =

Jupiter-family comet

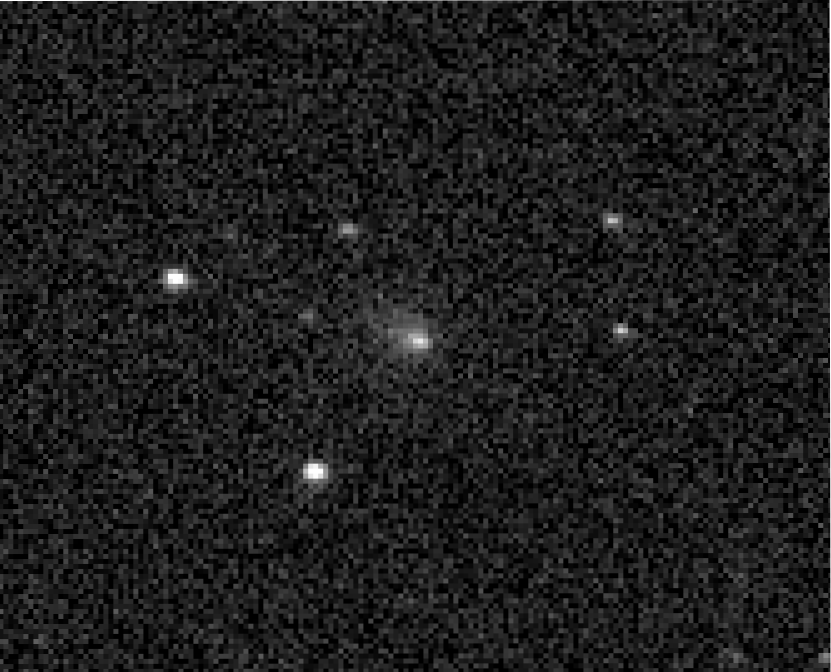
- Comet Singer Brewster imaged from the Zwicky Transient Facility on May 19, 2018

Discovery
- Discovered by: Stephen Singer-Brewster
- Discovery site: Palomar Observatory; 0.46-m Schmidt telescope
- Discovery date: May 3, 1986

Designations
- MPC designation: P/1986 J1, P/1992 G1
- Alternative designations: 1986 XI, 1992 XXVI; 1986d, 1992e

Orbital characteristics
- Epoch: 21 November 2025 (JD 2461000.5)
- Observation arc: 39.39 years (Note: Observation arc from the Minor Planet Center database covering dates from May 3, 1986 until September 24, 2025.)
- Number of observations: 947
- Aphelion: 4.894 AU
- Perihelion: 2.052 AU
- Semi-major axis: 3.473 AU
- Eccentricity: 0.40916
- Orbital period: 6.472 years
- Inclination: 9.168°
- Longitude of ascending node: 192.39°
- Argument of periapsis: 46.318°
- Mean anomaly: 46.037°
- Last perihelion: January 22, 2025
- Next perihelion: July 11, 2031
- T_{Jupiter}: 2.971
- Earth MOID: 1.052 AU
- Jupiter MOID: 0.369 AU

Physical characteristics
- Mean radius: 1.0 km (0.62 mi)
- Comet total magnitude (M1): 13.7

105P/Singer Brewster is a Jupiter-family comet with a 6.5-year orbit around the Sun. It was discovered in 1986, and received the name of 1986d under the old naming system.

Because 105P/Singer Brewster only comes within 2.0 AU (300 million km) of the Sun, during the 2012 perihelion passage it is only expected to brighten to about apparent magnitude 17.

== Name ==
The single discoverer bears a hyphenated surname (Singer-Brewster), but co-discovered comets bear the names of the co-discoverers linked by hyphens, e.g. Shoemaker–Levy 9, Swift–Tuttle, etc. In these cases, the IAU either removes one of the parts of the name or replaces the hyphen by a space.

== Observational history ==
Stephen Singer-Brewster discovered this comet from two plates that he and his two other colleagues taken from the Palomar Observatory's 0.46-m Schmidt telescope on May 3, 1986. Carolyn and Eugene M. Shoemaker later found the comet's tail using the same telescope the following night. Numerous additional astrometric observations were conducted by Brian G. Marsden and Shuichi Nakano by May 6, 1986, later determining that Comet Singer Brewster as periodic.

It was later recovered by James V. Scotti on its next apparition on 1 April 1992. It was recovered again on its 1999 apparition by Stephen M. Larson and Carl W. Hergenrother. The comet is successfully observed on its every apparition since discovery, the most recent one was conducted on September 24, 2025.

== Orbit ==
The orbit of Comet Singer Brewster was altered significantly in August 1976 when it passed within 0.376 AU (56.2 million km) of Jupiter, and will be altered again in August 2059.

== Physical characteristics ==
The nucleus of Comet Singer Brewster is estimated to be about 2.0 km (1.2 mi) in diameter.

== Notes ==
Numbered comets
Previous; 104P/Kowal	105P/Singer Brewster	Next; 106P/Schuster
