= Gary W. Kronk =

American astronomer and writer

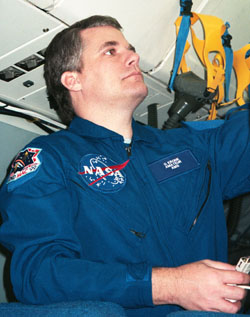
Gary W. Kronk during Leonid MAC 99

Gary W. Kronk (born 1956) is an American amateur astronomer and writer.

== Biography ==
Kronk was born in Granite City, Illinois, United States, on March 23, 1956. He developed an interest in space at an early age, during the time of the first crewed space flights of project Mercury; however, it was Mariner 4's close-up images of Mars that appeared on television the night of July 14, 1965 that focused his interest to astronomy. This interest was focused even more by Comet Kohoutek (C/1973 E1). Kronk first observed this comet on November 30, 1973, when he was a senior in high school. This observation provided the encouragement to research and write a paper about this comet and other great comets of the past for school. The teacher liked the paper so much, she submitted it to the local paper. He has been observing, researching, and writing about comets ever since.

Kronk received a bachelor of science degree in journalism from Southern Illinois University Edwardsville in 1981. He was then just shy of spending seven years in college as he struggled to find a major. In the end, he had a minor in English and extended studies in mathematics, physics, and psychology.

Kronk is known as a comet observer, researcher, and writer. His latest book project is Cometography, which is a six-volume series being published by Cambridge University Press. His knowledge of the history of comets has led to the linking of several comets to older apparitions. This includes linking periodic comet 109P/Swift-Tuttle to Chinese comets seen in 69 BC and AD 188, which helped confirm that the comet's motion was not greatly influenced by nongravitational effects, and linking periodic comet 104P/Kowal to a comet reported by the Reverend Leo Boethin (Philippines) in 1973, which helped confirm that its motion was greatly influenced by nongravitational effects.

Kronk's comet research is also strongly aligned to meteor shower research, because of the relationship between the two fields. He wrote the book Meteor Showers in 1988 and his expertise in the field drew an invitation to become part of the historic NASA/US Air Force Leonid MAC 99 which studied a meteor storm from the Leonid meteor shower while flying over the Mediterranean Sea.

== Awards ==
Charles P. Olivier Award, American Meteor Society, 1999.

The asteroid 48300 Kronk was named in his honor.

== Publications ==
Comets: A Descriptive Catalog, Enslow Publishers, Inc. (1984)

Meteor Showers, Enslow Publishers, Inc. (1988)

Cometography, volume 1, Cambridge University Press (1999)

Cometography, volume 2, Cambridge University Press (2004)

Cometography, volume 3, Cambridge University Press (2007)

Cometography, volume 4, Cambridge University Press (2008)

Cometography, volume 5, Cambridge University Press (2010)

Cometography, volume 6, Cambridge University Press (2017)

Meteor Showers, 2nd edition, Springer. (2013)

Lewis Swift: Celebrated Comet Hunter and the People's Astronomer, Springer. (2017)

Catalog of Unconfirmed Comets, volume 1, Springer. (2023)

Catalog of Unconfirmed Comets, volume 2, Springer. (2024)

== Personal Web Sites ==
https://web.archive.org/web/20230726005021/https://meteorshowersonline.com/
