= Stephen Singer-Brewster =

American astronomer

Asteroids discovered: 6
4555 Josefapérez	August 24, 1987
5253 Fredclifford	December 15, 1985
(15700) 1987 QD	August 24, 1987
(24655) 1987 QH	August 25, 1987
(26817) 1987 QB	August 25, 1987
(26818) 1987 QM	August 25, 1987

Stephen C. Singer-Brewster (born 1945) also known as Stephen C. Brewster is an American astronomer.

He is a member of the American Association of Variable Star Observers. He participated in the Palomar Planet Crossing Asteroid Survey (PCAS) as an observer and astrometrist under the direction of American astronomer Eleanor Helin (JPL/Caltech) from 1985 to 1988. During this period, Stephen Brewster was credited with the discovery of 105P/Singer Brewster, a Jupiter-family comet. He also discovered six asteroids including the named main-belt asteroid 4555 Josefapérez and 5253 Fredclifford, a Mars-crosser.

Singer-Brewster has been an active member of Stony Ridge Observatory, Inc. since 1983 and has served on its board of directors. He formed the Faint Object Follow Up (FOFU) project at Stony Ridge in 2000 to encourage observations of faint asteroids and comets.

Eleanor Helin honored him with the naming of the asteroid 10315 Brewster, to acknowledge his work for PCAS, Stony Ridge Observatory, and the Jet Propulsion Laboratory (JPL). Singer-Brewster is currently a retired member of the staff at JPL. At JPL, he worked on a number of spacecraft missions such as the Pluto Fast Flyby, the Outer Planets/Solar Probe Mission and the Europa Orbiter mission. At the time of his retirement in 2003 he was working in the Mars Advanced Studies Program and the Europa Orbiter/X2000 avionics development project at JPL.
