= List of minor planets: 422001–423000 =

The following is a partial list of minor planets, running from minor-planet number 422001 through 423000, inclusive. The primary data for this and other partial lists is based on JPL's "Small-Body Orbital Elements" and data available from the Minor Planet Center. Critical list information is also provided by the MPC, unless otherwise specified from Lowell Observatory. A detailed description of the table's columns and additional sources are given on the main page including a complete list of every page in this series, and a statistical break-up on the dynamical classification of minor planets.

Also see the summary list of all named bodies in numerical and alphabetical order, and the corresponding naming citations for the number range of this particular list. New namings may only be added to this list after official publication, as the preannouncement of names is condemned by the Working Group for Small Bodies Nomenclature of the International Astronomical Union.

Near-Earth obj.	MBA (inner)	MBA (outer)	Centaur
Mars-crosser	MBA (middle)	Jupiter trojan	Trans-Neptunian obj.
Unclassified

== 422001–422100 ==
Designation			Discovery			Properties		Ref
Permanent	Provisional	Named after	Date	Site	Discoverer(s)	Category	Diam.	Ref
422001	2014 QD_{315}	—	October 29, 2008	Kitt Peak	Spacewatch	·	620 m	MPC · JPL
422002	2014 QB_{321}	—	October 22, 2009	Mount Lemmon	Mount Lemmon Survey	·	3.0 km	MPC · JPL
422003	2014 QE_{321}	—	October 27, 2009	Mount Lemmon	Mount Lemmon Survey	EOS	1.7 km	MPC · JPL
422004	2014 QM_{322}	—	April 13, 2004	Kitt Peak	Spacewatch	·	1.2 km	MPC · JPL
422005	2014 QD_{323}	—	February 2, 2008	Kitt Peak	Spacewatch	·	1.6 km	MPC · JPL
422006	2014 QL_{325}	—	October 22, 2003	Apache Point	SDSS	·	2.9 km	MPC · JPL
422007	2014 QX_{326}	—	September 28, 2001	Palomar	NEAT	H	400 m	MPC · JPL
422008	2014 QM_{327}	—	November 19, 2000	Socorro	LINEAR	·	2.8 km	MPC · JPL
422009	2014 QP_{328}	—	August 19, 2006	Palomar	NEAT	·	1.5 km	MPC · JPL
422010	2014 QW_{328}	—	October 25, 2005	Kitt Peak	Spacewatch	·	2.1 km	MPC · JPL
422011	2014 QH_{329}	—	December 18, 2003	Socorro	LINEAR	·	1.4 km	MPC · JPL
422012	2014 QL_{329}	—	November 22, 2006	Mount Lemmon	Mount Lemmon Survey	·	1.9 km	MPC · JPL
422013	2014 QD_{333}	—	June 11, 2005	Kitt Peak	Spacewatch	·	1.3 km	MPC · JPL
422014	2014 QH_{333}	—	August 1, 2001	Palomar	NEAT	·	1.6 km	MPC · JPL
422015	2014 QO_{333}	—	March 1, 2009	Kitt Peak	Spacewatch	·	1.1 km	MPC · JPL
422016	2014 QZ_{333}	—	September 25, 2009	Kitt Peak	Spacewatch	·	1.6 km	MPC · JPL
422017	2014 QN_{334}	—	November 21, 2008	Mount Lemmon	Mount Lemmon Survey	·	560 m	MPC · JPL
422018	2014 QN_{335}	—	February 6, 2002	Kitt Peak	Deep Ecliptic Survey	·	2.1 km	MPC · JPL
422019	2014 QX_{335}	—	August 21, 2008	Kitt Peak	Spacewatch	·	2.9 km	MPC · JPL
422020	2014 QJ_{336}	—	August 12, 2001	Haleakala	NEAT	·	2.2 km	MPC · JPL
422021	2014 QL_{336}	—	January 8, 2007	Mount Lemmon	Mount Lemmon Survey	·	2.0 km	MPC · JPL
422022	2014 QL_{337}	—	December 27, 2003	Kitt Peak	Spacewatch	·	1.1 km	MPC · JPL
422023	2014 QW_{340}	—	March 11, 2008	Mount Lemmon	Mount Lemmon Survey	EUN	1.3 km	MPC · JPL
422024	2014 QT_{341}	—	September 16, 2003	Kitt Peak	Spacewatch	·	2.2 km	MPC · JPL
422025	2014 QW_{341}	—	January 19, 2004	Kitt Peak	Spacewatch	·	1.2 km	MPC · JPL
422026	2014 QE_{342}	—	August 18, 2009	Kitt Peak	Spacewatch	EOS	2.0 km	MPC · JPL
422027	2014 QF_{342}	—	July 22, 2006	Mount Lemmon	Mount Lemmon Survey	·	1.1 km	MPC · JPL
422028	2014 QJ_{343}	—	July 31, 2009	Kitt Peak	Spacewatch	·	2.5 km	MPC · JPL
422029	2014 QF_{347}	—	August 1, 2003	Haleakala	NEAT	·	3.6 km	MPC · JPL
422030	2014 QS_{347}	—	October 5, 2002	Palomar	NEAT	·	1.1 km	MPC · JPL
422031	2014 QX_{347}	—	September 10, 2007	Mount Lemmon	Mount Lemmon Survey	NYS	1.1 km	MPC · JPL
422032	2014 QY_{347}	—	October 2, 2006	Mount Lemmon	Mount Lemmon Survey	·	1.1 km	MPC · JPL
422033	2014 QU_{348}	—	April 1, 2005	Kitt Peak	Spacewatch	·	1.5 km	MPC · JPL
422034	2014 QA_{350}	—	January 28, 2007	Mount Lemmon	Mount Lemmon Survey	·	1.9 km	MPC · JPL
422035	2014 QM_{350}	—	August 18, 2006	Kitt Peak	Spacewatch	·	1.0 km	MPC · JPL
422036	2014 QA_{351}	—	December 26, 2006	Kitt Peak	Spacewatch	·	1.5 km	MPC · JPL
422037	2014 QN_{351}	—	September 25, 2009	Kitt Peak	Spacewatch	·	2.1 km	MPC · JPL
422038	2014 QT_{354}	—	August 26, 2005	Palomar	NEAT	·	1.4 km	MPC · JPL
422039	2014 QJ_{355}	—	August 30, 1998	Kitt Peak	Spacewatch	EOS	1.9 km	MPC · JPL
422040	2014 QR_{355}	—	July 23, 2003	Palomar	NEAT	·	2.8 km	MPC · JPL
422041	2014 QV_{355}	—	November 30, 2003	Kitt Peak	Spacewatch	THM	2.4 km	MPC · JPL
422042	2014 QY_{355}	—	November 22, 2006	Kitt Peak	Spacewatch	·	1.4 km	MPC · JPL
422043	2014 QO_{357}	—	September 4, 2008	Kitt Peak	Spacewatch	·	2.8 km	MPC · JPL
422044	2014 QY_{357}	—	January 26, 2006	Kitt Peak	Spacewatch	·	690 m	MPC · JPL
422045	2014 QZ_{357}	—	September 12, 2007	Mount Lemmon	Mount Lemmon Survey	·	760 m	MPC · JPL
422046	2014 QG_{358}	—	September 30, 2003	Kitt Peak	Spacewatch	·	1.3 km	MPC · JPL
422047	2014 QN_{358}	—	November 29, 2005	Kitt Peak	Spacewatch	KOR	1.5 km	MPC · JPL
422048	2014 QW_{358}	—	September 15, 2004	Kitt Peak	Spacewatch	·	580 m	MPC · JPL
422049	2014 QE_{359}	—	March 10, 2005	Mount Lemmon	Mount Lemmon Survey	·	1.2 km	MPC · JPL
422050	2014 QR_{360}	—	July 6, 2003	Kitt Peak	Spacewatch	EOS	1.8 km	MPC · JPL
422051	2014 QZ_{360}	—	November 24, 2003	Kitt Peak	Spacewatch	MAS	530 m	MPC · JPL
422052	2014 QT_{365}	—	September 27, 2003	Kitt Peak	Spacewatch	·	2.7 km	MPC · JPL
422053	2014 QA_{366}	—	February 25, 2007	Kitt Peak	Spacewatch	THM	2.2 km	MPC · JPL
422054	2014 QE_{366}	—	January 16, 2005	Mauna Kea	P. A. Wiegert	NYS	1.3 km	MPC · JPL
422055	2014 QQ_{366}	—	September 25, 2003	Palomar	NEAT	·	3.3 km	MPC · JPL
422056	2014 QO_{367}	—	February 12, 2004	Kitt Peak	Spacewatch	·	1.3 km	MPC · JPL
422057	2014 QT_{367}	—	October 30, 2002	Haleakala	NEAT	·	970 m	MPC · JPL
422058	2014 QH_{370}	—	March 7, 2008	Kitt Peak	Spacewatch	(11882)	1.7 km	MPC · JPL
422059	2014 QN_{373}	—	March 13, 2007	Mount Lemmon	Mount Lemmon Survey	·	3.3 km	MPC · JPL
422060	2014 QW_{373}	—	January 27, 2007	Kitt Peak	Spacewatch	HOF	2.6 km	MPC · JPL
422061	2014 QK_{375}	—	October 4, 2007	Mount Lemmon	Mount Lemmon Survey	·	620 m	MPC · JPL
422062	2014 QV_{375}	—	October 23, 2006	Mount Lemmon	Mount Lemmon Survey	·	1.5 km	MPC · JPL
422063	2014 QK_{377}	—	March 19, 2009	Kitt Peak	Spacewatch	·	1.5 km	MPC · JPL
422064	2014 QQ_{378}	—	September 18, 2003	Kitt Peak	Spacewatch	·	2.6 km	MPC · JPL
422065	2014 QV_{378}	—	April 24, 2008	Mount Lemmon	Mount Lemmon Survey	·	1.8 km	MPC · JPL
422066	2014 QD_{379}	—	October 11, 2009	Mount Lemmon	Mount Lemmon Survey	·	1.9 km	MPC · JPL
422067	2014 QM_{379}	—	October 17, 2003	Kitt Peak	Spacewatch	HYG	2.4 km	MPC · JPL
422068	2014 QG_{380}	—	February 10, 2002	Socorro	LINEAR	·	2.0 km	MPC · JPL
422069	2014 QK_{380}	—	September 22, 2003	Kitt Peak	Spacewatch	·	1.1 km	MPC · JPL
422070	2014 QP_{380}	—	August 19, 2009	Kitt Peak	Spacewatch	·	2.4 km	MPC · JPL
422071	2014 QV_{380}	—	October 14, 1998	Kitt Peak	Spacewatch	EOS	3.9 km	MPC · JPL
422072	2014 QW_{380}	—	February 2, 2006	Kitt Peak	Spacewatch	·	790 m	MPC · JPL
422073	2014 QL_{381}	—	September 26, 2005	Kitt Peak	Spacewatch	HOF	2.5 km	MPC · JPL
422074	2014 QQ_{381}	—	October 6, 1999	Kitt Peak	Spacewatch	·	1.0 km	MPC · JPL
422075	2014 QY_{381}	—	March 6, 2008	Kitt Peak	Spacewatch	·	1.4 km	MPC · JPL
422076	2014 QT_{382}	—	October 31, 2006	Mount Lemmon	Mount Lemmon Survey	(5)	1.1 km	MPC · JPL
422077	2014 QK_{383}	—	April 30, 2005	Kitt Peak	Spacewatch	·	1.5 km	MPC · JPL
422078	2014 QP_{383}	—	September 20, 2003	Kitt Peak	Spacewatch	·	4.8 km	MPC · JPL
422079	2014 QB_{385}	—	October 19, 2003	Kitt Peak	Spacewatch	MAS	900 m	MPC · JPL
422080	2014 QR_{386}	—	January 8, 2000	Kitt Peak	Spacewatch	EOS	1.8 km	MPC · JPL
422081	2014 QL_{387}	—	February 5, 2009	Mount Lemmon	Mount Lemmon Survey	JUN	1.3 km	MPC · JPL
422082	2014 QW_{388}	—	July 25, 2001	Kitt Peak	Spacewatch	EUN	1.3 km	MPC · JPL
422083	2014 QP_{389}	—	March 5, 2006	Kitt Peak	Spacewatch	·	5.6 km	MPC · JPL
422084	2014 QW_{389}	—	October 23, 2003	Kitt Peak	Spacewatch	·	1.8 km	MPC · JPL
422085	2014 QC_{390}	—	December 16, 2007	Mount Lemmon	Mount Lemmon Survey	·	1.6 km	MPC · JPL
422086	2014 QG_{390}	—	March 1, 1998	Kitt Peak	Spacewatch	H	490 m	MPC · JPL
422087	2014 QT_{392}	—	February 29, 2000	Socorro	LINEAR	·	2.0 km	MPC · JPL
422088	2014 QE_{394}	—	April 9, 2003	Palomar	NEAT	·	1.8 km	MPC · JPL
422089	2014 QK_{394}	—	December 26, 2005	Kitt Peak	Spacewatch	KOR	1.6 km	MPC · JPL
422090	2014 QK_{396}	—	November 18, 2010	Kitt Peak	Spacewatch	·	1.6 km	MPC · JPL
422091	2014 QS_{396}	—	February 24, 2008	Mount Lemmon	Mount Lemmon Survey	·	1.1 km	MPC · JPL
422092	2014 QW_{397}	—	September 29, 2003	Kitt Peak	Spacewatch	·	2.3 km	MPC · JPL
422093	2014 QE_{398}	—	September 6, 2008	Mount Lemmon	Mount Lemmon Survey	·	2.9 km	MPC · JPL
422094	2014 QS_{398}	—	October 27, 2005	Palomar	NEAT	·	1.8 km	MPC · JPL
422095	2014 QM_{399}	—	July 12, 2005	Kitt Peak	Spacewatch	·	1.9 km	MPC · JPL
422096	2014 QM_{400}	—	August 22, 2004	Kitt Peak	Spacewatch	·	2.3 km	MPC · JPL
422097	2014 QH_{401}	—	December 4, 2005	Mount Lemmon	Mount Lemmon Survey	·	2.0 km	MPC · JPL
422098	2014 QC_{402}	—	January 12, 2010	WISE	WISE	·	4.3 km	MPC · JPL
422099	2014 QL_{402}	—	October 1, 2003	Kitt Peak	Spacewatch	V	600 m	MPC · JPL
422100	2014 QE_{404}	—	October 23, 2003	Kitt Peak	Spacewatch	·	3.0 km	MPC · JPL

== 422101–422200 ==
back to top

Designation			Discovery			Properties		Ref
Permanent	Provisional	Named after	Date	Site	Discoverer(s)	Category	Diam.	Ref
422101	2014 QD_{405}	—	February 1, 2001	Kitt Peak	Spacewatch	TIR	3.4 km	MPC · JPL
422102	2014 QU_{406}	—	January 31, 2010	WISE	WISE	·	4.9 km	MPC · JPL
422103	2014 QZ_{406}	—	February 25, 2006	Kitt Peak	Spacewatch	·	2.9 km	MPC · JPL
422104	2014 QO_{407}	—	October 12, 2005	Kitt Peak	Spacewatch	AGN	1.1 km	MPC · JPL
422105	2014 QL_{408}	—	October 7, 2005	Kitt Peak	Spacewatch	·	1.8 km	MPC · JPL
422106	2014 QQ_{408}	—	July 28, 2003	Palomar	NEAT	·	5.1 km	MPC · JPL
422107	2014 QT_{408}	—	October 27, 2005	Kitt Peak	Spacewatch	·	2.2 km	MPC · JPL
422108	2014 QV_{408}	—	March 5, 2008	Kitt Peak	Spacewatch	·	1.3 km	MPC · JPL
422109	2014 QE_{409}	—	March 27, 2008	Mount Lemmon	Mount Lemmon Survey	(5)	1.7 km	MPC · JPL
422110	2014 QD_{410}	—	March 6, 2003	Anderson Mesa	LONEOS	BRA	2.2 km	MPC · JPL
422111	2014 QQ_{410}	—	September 14, 2002	Palomar	NEAT	·	750 m	MPC · JPL
422112	2014 QP_{411}	—	September 17, 2010	Mount Lemmon	Mount Lemmon Survey	(12739)	1.6 km	MPC · JPL
422113	2014 QK_{413}	—	August 27, 2001	Kitt Peak	Spacewatch	·	1.3 km	MPC · JPL
422114	2014 QP_{413}	—	November 1, 2005	Mount Lemmon	Mount Lemmon Survey	KOR	1.5 km	MPC · JPL
422115	2014 QY_{413}	—	January 13, 2005	Kitt Peak	Spacewatch	NYS	840 m	MPC · JPL
422116	2014 QG_{414}	—	January 9, 2007	Mount Lemmon	Mount Lemmon Survey	·	2.0 km	MPC · JPL
422117	2014 QU_{414}	—	October 14, 2010	Mount Lemmon	Mount Lemmon Survey	KOR	1.2 km	MPC · JPL
422118	2014 QB_{415}	—	October 9, 2007	Kitt Peak	Spacewatch	·	1.1 km	MPC · JPL
422119	2014 QY_{416}	—	September 15, 2009	Kitt Peak	Spacewatch	EOS	1.6 km	MPC · JPL
422120	2014 QJ_{417}	—	January 9, 2006	Kitt Peak	Spacewatch	·	2.1 km	MPC · JPL
422121	2014 QH_{418}	—	November 14, 2007	Kitt Peak	Spacewatch	·	1.2 km	MPC · JPL
422122	2014 QJ_{418}	—	January 15, 2005	Kitt Peak	Spacewatch	·	3.6 km	MPC · JPL
422123	2014 QL_{418}	—	October 3, 2003	Kitt Peak	Spacewatch	·	900 m	MPC · JPL
422124	2014 QY_{418}	—	August 29, 2005	Kitt Peak	Spacewatch	·	1.9 km	MPC · JPL
422125	2014 QB_{419}	—	August 18, 2009	Kitt Peak	Spacewatch	·	1.7 km	MPC · JPL
422126	2014 QT_{419}	—	October 25, 2005	Kitt Peak	Spacewatch	HOF	2.4 km	MPC · JPL
422127	2014 QA_{420}	—	September 4, 2003	Kitt Peak	Spacewatch	·	2.9 km	MPC · JPL
422128	2014 QG_{421}	—	November 28, 2005	Kitt Peak	Spacewatch	GEF	1.4 km	MPC · JPL
422129	2014 QT_{421}	—	October 27, 2008	Mount Lemmon	Mount Lemmon Survey	SYL · CYB	4.6 km	MPC · JPL
422130	2014 QA_{423}	—	September 3, 1999	Kitt Peak	Spacewatch	·	700 m	MPC · JPL
422131	2014 QD_{423}	—	February 21, 2007	Kitt Peak	Spacewatch	·	1.8 km	MPC · JPL
422132	2014 QM_{423}	—	April 22, 2009	Mount Lemmon	Mount Lemmon Survey	·	1.1 km	MPC · JPL
422133	2014 QX_{423}	—	October 30, 2005	Kitt Peak	Spacewatch	·	2.6 km	MPC · JPL
422134	2014 QY_{423}	—	November 18, 2009	Mount Lemmon	Mount Lemmon Survey	·	3.0 km	MPC · JPL
422135	2014 QF_{425}	—	November 24, 2006	Kitt Peak	Spacewatch	MIS	2.3 km	MPC · JPL
422136	2014 QQ_{425}	—	September 12, 2007	Catalina	CSS	·	990 m	MPC · JPL
422137	2014 QO_{426}	—	August 29, 2006	Catalina	CSS	·	1.3 km	MPC · JPL
422138	2014 QH_{428}	—	October 5, 2004	Kitt Peak	Spacewatch	·	630 m	MPC · JPL
422139	2014 QO_{430}	—	October 15, 2009	Mount Lemmon	Mount Lemmon Survey	·	2.2 km	MPC · JPL
422140	2014 QY_{430}	—	September 27, 2009	Mount Lemmon	Mount Lemmon Survey	·	2.3 km	MPC · JPL
422141	2014 QL_{432}	—	November 12, 2001	Socorro	LINEAR	·	2.1 km	MPC · JPL
422142	2014 QS_{432}	—	January 30, 2008	Kitt Peak	Spacewatch	·	1.5 km	MPC · JPL
422143	2014 QU_{434}	—	December 13, 1999	Kitt Peak	Spacewatch	3:2	5.7 km	MPC · JPL
422144	2014 QV_{434}	—	October 27, 2005	Kitt Peak	Spacewatch	AGN	1.1 km	MPC · JPL
422145	2014 QT_{437}	—	July 5, 2005	Siding Spring	SSS	·	2.0 km	MPC · JPL
422146	2014 QV_{437}	—	March 10, 2005	Mount Lemmon	Mount Lemmon Survey	·	1.9 km	MPC · JPL
422147	2014 QK_{438}	—	November 16, 2009	Mount Lemmon	Mount Lemmon Survey	·	2.4 km	MPC · JPL
422148	2014 QS_{438}	—	January 10, 2007	Kitt Peak	Spacewatch	·	1.4 km	MPC · JPL
422149	2014 QV_{438}	—	March 11, 2010	WISE	WISE	·	2.1 km	MPC · JPL
422150	2014 QE_{439}	—	May 31, 2006	Mount Lemmon	Mount Lemmon Survey	·	1.2 km	MPC · JPL
422151	2014 QJ_{441}	—	October 2, 2008	Catalina	CSS	T_{j} (2.97)	4.0 km	MPC · JPL
422152	2014 RD	—	April 5, 2008	Mount Lemmon	Mount Lemmon Survey	·	1.4 km	MPC · JPL
422153	2014 RW_{1}	—	January 1, 2009	Mount Lemmon	Mount Lemmon Survey	·	2.0 km	MPC · JPL
422154	2014 RA_{2}	—	September 27, 2003	Kitt Peak	Spacewatch	·	1.3 km	MPC · JPL
422155	2014 RS_{2}	—	November 1, 2005	Kitt Peak	Spacewatch	KOR	1.4 km	MPC · JPL
422156	2014 RY_{2}	—	October 30, 2005	Kitt Peak	Spacewatch	KOR	1.3 km	MPC · JPL
422157	2014 RF_{3}	—	January 6, 2005	Catalina	CSS	·	1.1 km	MPC · JPL
422158	2014 RY_{4}	—	December 30, 2005	Kitt Peak	Spacewatch	EOS	1.9 km	MPC · JPL
422159	2014 RK_{6}	—	January 31, 2006	Kitt Peak	Spacewatch	·	2.7 km	MPC · JPL
422160	2014 RP_{6}	—	November 30, 2010	Mount Lemmon	Mount Lemmon Survey	·	1.5 km	MPC · JPL
422161	2014 RW_{6}	—	February 9, 2008	Kitt Peak	Spacewatch	·	1.2 km	MPC · JPL
422162	2014 RX_{6}	—	September 3, 2007	Catalina	CSS	·	730 m	MPC · JPL
422163	2014 RB_{7}	—	November 9, 1999	Socorro	LINEAR	MAS	910 m	MPC · JPL
422164	2014 RO_{7}	—	March 12, 2005	Kitt Peak	Spacewatch	·	980 m	MPC · JPL
422165	2014 RM_{8}	—	March 24, 2012	Mount Lemmon	Mount Lemmon Survey	·	1.9 km	MPC · JPL
422166	2014 RB_{9}	—	October 28, 2005	Kitt Peak	Spacewatch	·	640 m	MPC · JPL
422167	2014 RU_{15}	—	April 2, 2009	Kitt Peak	Spacewatch	·	1.2 km	MPC · JPL
422168	2014 RN_{16}	—	October 30, 2010	Kitt Peak	Spacewatch	·	1.7 km	MPC · JPL
422169	2014 RT_{16}	—	March 16, 2007	Kitt Peak	Spacewatch	·	2.7 km	MPC · JPL
422170	2014 RZ_{16}	—	February 12, 2010	WISE	WISE	·	4.0 km	MPC · JPL
422171	2014 RZ_{18}	—	September 20, 1995	Kitt Peak	Spacewatch	MAS	740 m	MPC · JPL
422172	2014 RA_{19}	—	September 14, 2005	Kitt Peak	Spacewatch	EUN	1.3 km	MPC · JPL
422173	2014 RC_{19}	—	November 28, 2005	Mount Lemmon	Mount Lemmon Survey	·	2.6 km	MPC · JPL
422174	2014 RG_{19}	—	November 4, 2004	Catalina	CSS	·	840 m	MPC · JPL
422175	2014 RJ_{19}	—	July 23, 2010	WISE	WISE	·	2.0 km	MPC · JPL
422176	2014 RK_{20}	—	October 2, 2003	Kitt Peak	Spacewatch	·	1.1 km	MPC · JPL
422177	2014 RS_{20}	—	November 28, 2003	Kitt Peak	Spacewatch	·	1.2 km	MPC · JPL
422178	2014 RM_{21}	—	August 27, 2001	Kitt Peak	Spacewatch	·	1.8 km	MPC · JPL
422179	2014 RZ_{21}	—	December 2, 2004	Kitt Peak	Spacewatch	·	4.0 km	MPC · JPL
422180	2014 RA_{22}	—	December 27, 2005	Kitt Peak	Spacewatch	·	3.7 km	MPC · JPL
422181	2014 RF_{22}	—	December 29, 2011	Mount Lemmon	Mount Lemmon Survey	V	650 m	MPC · JPL
422182	2014 RH_{22}	—	May 24, 2006	Kitt Peak	Spacewatch	·	850 m	MPC · JPL
422183	2014 RY_{24}	—	March 16, 2004	Kitt Peak	Spacewatch	·	2.3 km	MPC · JPL
422184	2014 RX_{26}	—	September 19, 2003	Palomar	NEAT	·	5.1 km	MPC · JPL
422185	2014 RY_{26}	—	October 27, 2009	Mount Lemmon	Mount Lemmon Survey	·	4.8 km	MPC · JPL
422186	2014 RR_{29}	—	October 23, 2003	Anderson Mesa	LONEOS	·	1.1 km	MPC · JPL
422187	2014 RT_{30}	—	October 27, 2009	Catalina	CSS	·	3.7 km	MPC · JPL
422188	2014 RB_{31}	—	August 29, 2006	Catalina	CSS	T_{j} (2.91) · 3:2	6.8 km	MPC · JPL
422189	2014 RE_{33}	—	January 31, 2006	Kitt Peak	Spacewatch	·	3.0 km	MPC · JPL
422190	2014 RA_{34}	—	August 26, 1998	Kitt Peak	Spacewatch	·	2.6 km	MPC · JPL
422191	2014 RB_{35}	—	December 27, 2005	Kitt Peak	Spacewatch	·	2.5 km	MPC · JPL
422192	2014 RN_{38}	—	November 4, 2005	Mount Lemmon	Mount Lemmon Survey	·	1.8 km	MPC · JPL
422193	2014 RS_{41}	—	October 19, 1995	Kitt Peak	Spacewatch	MAS	920 m	MPC · JPL
422194	2014 RB_{42}	—	September 7, 2004	Kitt Peak	Spacewatch	·	700 m	MPC · JPL
422195	2014 RK_{42}	—	September 28, 2003	Kitt Peak	Spacewatch	·	1.0 km	MPC · JPL
422196	2014 RZ_{42}	—	March 12, 2002	Kitt Peak	Spacewatch	·	2.0 km	MPC · JPL
422197	2014 RT_{43}	—	June 20, 2002	La Palma	Collander-Brown, S., A. Fitzsimmons	·	4.2 km	MPC · JPL
422198	2014 RG_{44}	—	November 11, 2004	Kitt Peak	Spacewatch	·	950 m	MPC · JPL
422199	2014 RX_{44}	—	December 11, 2004	Kitt Peak	Spacewatch	·	480 m	MPC · JPL
422200	2014 RC_{45}	—	October 5, 2004	Kitt Peak	Spacewatch	·	1.7 km	MPC · JPL

== 422201–422300 ==
back to top

Designation			Discovery			Properties		Ref
Permanent	Provisional	Named after	Date	Site	Discoverer(s)	Category	Diam.	Ref
422201	2014 RD_{45}	—	May 12, 2007	Mount Lemmon	Mount Lemmon Survey	·	3.0 km	MPC · JPL
422202	2014 RE_{45}	—	September 19, 2003	Kitt Peak	Spacewatch	·	3.0 km	MPC · JPL
422203	2014 RG_{45}	—	December 19, 2004	Mount Lemmon	Mount Lemmon Survey	·	2.3 km	MPC · JPL
422204	2014 RP_{46}	—	February 14, 2005	Kitt Peak	Spacewatch	·	1.0 km	MPC · JPL
422205	2014 RH_{48}	—	October 2, 2003	Kitt Peak	Spacewatch	·	3.2 km	MPC · JPL
422206	2014 RR_{49}	—	September 21, 2003	Kitt Peak	Spacewatch	·	3.2 km	MPC · JPL
422207	2014 RD_{50}	—	April 4, 2005	Mount Lemmon	Mount Lemmon Survey	·	1.5 km	MPC · JPL
422208	2014 RJ_{50}	—	March 5, 2006	Kitt Peak	Spacewatch	·	3.1 km	MPC · JPL
422209	2014 RR_{50}	—	October 14, 2001	Kitt Peak	Spacewatch	·	1.3 km	MPC · JPL
422210	2014 RD_{53}	—	December 17, 2001	Socorro	LINEAR	·	3.2 km	MPC · JPL
422211	2014 RR_{55}	—	April 8, 2006	Kitt Peak	Spacewatch	·	760 m	MPC · JPL
422212	2014 RX_{55}	—	April 27, 2001	Kitt Peak	Spacewatch	VER	2.6 km	MPC · JPL
422213	2014 RG_{56}	—	October 30, 2006	Catalina	CSS	·	1.1 km	MPC · JPL
422214	2014 RJ_{56}	—	April 25, 2007	Kitt Peak	Spacewatch	EOS	2.2 km	MPC · JPL
422215	2014 RH_{60}	—	September 29, 2003	Kitt Peak	Spacewatch	·	1.1 km	MPC · JPL
422216	2014 RY_{60}	—	October 4, 2006	Mount Lemmon	Mount Lemmon Survey	·	1.7 km	MPC · JPL
422217	2014 RZ_{60}	—	January 13, 2002	Kitt Peak	Spacewatch	·	800 m	MPC · JPL
422218	2014 RE_{61}	—	August 27, 2003	Palomar	NEAT	·	2.9 km	MPC · JPL
422219	2014 RH_{61}	—	July 6, 2000	Anderson Mesa	LONEOS	·	890 m	MPC · JPL
422220	2014 RJ_{61}	—	October 27, 2009	Mount Lemmon	Mount Lemmon Survey	·	4.1 km	MPC · JPL
422221	2014 RL_{61}	—	November 30, 2008	Kitt Peak	Spacewatch	·	1.1 km	MPC · JPL
422222	2014 RV_{61}	—	October 5, 2004	Palomar	NEAT	·	1.0 km	MPC · JPL
422223	2014 RA_{62}	—	March 23, 2003	Apache Point	SDSS	·	2.0 km	MPC · JPL
422224	2014 RJ_{62}	—	July 20, 2003	Palomar	NEAT	·	2.5 km	MPC · JPL
422225	2014 RL_{62}	—	September 7, 1999	Socorro	LINEAR	PHO	1.1 km	MPC · JPL
422226	2014 RM_{62}	—	September 17, 2001	Anderson Mesa	LONEOS	·	1.9 km	MPC · JPL
422227	2014 RO_{62}	—	April 9, 2010	Mount Lemmon	Mount Lemmon Survey	·	800 m	MPC · JPL
422228	2014 RP_{62}	—	January 28, 2004	Kitt Peak	Spacewatch	·	1.8 km	MPC · JPL
422229	2014 RR_{62}	—	November 14, 2007	Kitt Peak	Spacewatch	V	820 m	MPC · JPL
422230	2014 RT_{62}	—	December 14, 2007	Mount Lemmon	Mount Lemmon Survey	NYS	1.3 km	MPC · JPL
422231	2014 RD_{63}	—	October 21, 2001	Socorro	LINEAR	·	2.1 km	MPC · JPL
422232	2014 RL_{63}	—	July 17, 2010	Siding Spring	SSS	·	1.8 km	MPC · JPL
422233	2014 SA_{2}	—	October 12, 2009	Mount Lemmon	Mount Lemmon Survey	HYG	2.3 km	MPC · JPL
422234	2014 SP_{9}	—	March 11, 2007	Mount Lemmon	Mount Lemmon Survey	·	1.7 km	MPC · JPL
422235	2014 SW_{9}	—	October 7, 2005	Kitt Peak	Spacewatch	PAD	1.5 km	MPC · JPL
422236	2014 SD_{19}	—	July 7, 2005	Kitt Peak	Spacewatch	·	1.5 km	MPC · JPL
422237	2014 SZ_{20}	—	September 24, 1960	Palomar	C. J. van Houten, I. van Houten-Groeneveld, T. Gehrels	·	2.7 km	MPC · JPL
422238	2014 SN_{23}	—	February 7, 2007	Mount Lemmon	Mount Lemmon Survey	AGN	1.3 km	MPC · JPL
422239	2014 SS_{30}	—	March 24, 2009	Mount Lemmon	Mount Lemmon Survey	·	1.3 km	MPC · JPL
422240	2014 SR_{41}	—	March 17, 2010	Kitt Peak	Spacewatch	·	900 m	MPC · JPL
422241	2014 SZ_{45}	—	November 20, 2007	Kitt Peak	Spacewatch	·	1.3 km	MPC · JPL
422242	2014 SH_{46}	—	October 16, 2009	Mount Lemmon	Mount Lemmon Survey	·	2.6 km	MPC · JPL
422243	2014 SW_{46}	—	August 29, 2006	Kitt Peak	Spacewatch	·	1.4 km	MPC · JPL
422244	2014 SX_{55}	—	February 10, 2002	Socorro	LINEAR	·	980 m	MPC · JPL
422245	2014 SM_{59}	—	October 13, 2004	Kitt Peak	Spacewatch	·	850 m	MPC · JPL
422246	2014 SC_{64}	—	March 13, 1999	Kitt Peak	Spacewatch	·	2.4 km	MPC · JPL
422247	2014 SF_{68}	—	August 7, 2000	Haleakala	NEAT	·	910 m	MPC · JPL
422248	2014 SC_{76}	—	October 24, 2003	Kitt Peak	Spacewatch	·	1.4 km	MPC · JPL
422249	2014 SC_{82}	—	February 25, 2006	Mount Lemmon	Mount Lemmon Survey	VER	3.5 km	MPC · JPL
422250	2014 SX_{87}	—	October 9, 2005	Kitt Peak	Spacewatch	·	2.1 km	MPC · JPL
422251	2014 SU_{102}	—	July 7, 2010	WISE	WISE	·	1.7 km	MPC · JPL
422252	2014 SK_{115}	—	October 13, 2005	Kitt Peak	Spacewatch	DOR	2.2 km	MPC · JPL
422253	2014 SN_{125}	—	September 14, 2007	Kitt Peak	Spacewatch	·	470 m	MPC · JPL
422254	2014 SU_{125}	—	October 20, 2006	Kitt Peak	Spacewatch	·	970 m	MPC · JPL
422255	2014 SY_{131}	—	March 9, 2007	Mount Lemmon	Mount Lemmon Survey	KOR	1.3 km	MPC · JPL
422256	2014 SD_{134}	—	October 3, 2006	Mount Lemmon	Mount Lemmon Survey	·	1.3 km	MPC · JPL
422257	2014 SJ_{135}	—	November 1, 2006	Mount Lemmon	Mount Lemmon Survey	·	1.4 km	MPC · JPL
422258	2014 SK_{135}	—	June 23, 1995	Kitt Peak	Spacewatch	·	2.0 km	MPC · JPL
422259	2014 SQ_{135}	—	February 10, 2002	Socorro	LINEAR	·	2.4 km	MPC · JPL
422260	2014 ST_{135}	—	August 28, 2005	Anderson Mesa	LONEOS	·	2.1 km	MPC · JPL
422261	2014 SJ_{141}	—	November 17, 2006	Mount Lemmon	Mount Lemmon Survey	·	1.4 km	MPC · JPL
422262	2014 SO_{141}	—	September 3, 2008	Kitt Peak	Spacewatch	·	3.5 km	MPC · JPL
422263	2014 SJ_{144}	—	October 16, 1977	Palomar	C. J. van Houten, I. van Houten-Groeneveld, T. Gehrels	·	1.3 km	MPC · JPL
422264	2014 SC_{147}	—	October 21, 2001	Socorro	LINEAR	·	1.6 km	MPC · JPL
422265	2014 SS_{147}	—	September 24, 1960	Palomar	C. J. van Houten, I. van Houten-Groeneveld, T. Gehrels	·	1.9 km	MPC · JPL
422266	2014 SL_{148}	—	September 16, 2004	Kitt Peak	Spacewatch	·	2.0 km	MPC · JPL
422267	2014 ST_{148}	—	June 16, 2005	Kitt Peak	Spacewatch	·	1.6 km	MPC · JPL
422268	2014 SG_{150}	—	October 15, 2001	Palomar	NEAT	·	2.0 km	MPC · JPL
422269	2014 SM_{150}	—	October 23, 2005	Catalina	CSS	DOR	2.1 km	MPC · JPL
422270	2014 SH_{151}	—	December 14, 2001	Socorro	LINEAR	·	1.9 km	MPC · JPL
422271	2014 SQ_{151}	—	September 17, 2003	Palomar	NEAT	EOS	2.1 km	MPC · JPL
422272	2014 SB_{152}	—	November 9, 2007	Kitt Peak	Spacewatch	·	1.2 km	MPC · JPL
422273	2014 SJ_{152}	—	September 14, 2005	Kitt Peak	Spacewatch	·	1.9 km	MPC · JPL
422274	2014 SO_{152}	—	September 11, 2010	Mount Lemmon	Mount Lemmon Survey	·	1.3 km	MPC · JPL
422275	2014 SP_{152}	—	February 10, 2008	Kitt Peak	Spacewatch	MIS	2.7 km	MPC · JPL
422276	2014 SQ_{152}	—	October 11, 2001	Palomar	NEAT	EUN	1.3 km	MPC · JPL
422277	2014 SW_{152}	—	October 20, 2003	Kitt Peak	Spacewatch	·	1.3 km	MPC · JPL
422278	2014 SC_{153}	—	July 25, 2003	Palomar	NEAT	·	3.2 km	MPC · JPL
422279	2014 SJ_{153}	—	October 2, 2008	Mount Lemmon	Mount Lemmon Survey	·	4.5 km	MPC · JPL
422280	2014 SL_{153}	—	September 19, 2003	Kitt Peak	Spacewatch	·	940 m	MPC · JPL
422281	2014 SP_{154}	—	October 11, 1999	Kitt Peak	Spacewatch	NYS	1.4 km	MPC · JPL
422282	2014 SC_{155}	—	November 10, 2004	Kitt Peak	Spacewatch	·	3.0 km	MPC · JPL
422283	2014 SF_{155}	—	April 6, 2000	Socorro	LINEAR	MAR	1.1 km	MPC · JPL
422284	2014 SH_{155}	—	March 25, 2006	Mount Lemmon	Mount Lemmon Survey	·	780 m	MPC · JPL
422285	2014 SJ_{155}	—	October 19, 2003	Kitt Peak	Spacewatch	NYS	1.1 km	MPC · JPL
422286	2014 ST_{155}	—	September 18, 2003	Kitt Peak	Spacewatch	·	1.2 km	MPC · JPL
422287	2014 SV_{155}	—	October 22, 2006	Catalina	CSS	·	1.7 km	MPC · JPL
422288	2014 SE_{156}	—	October 1, 2003	Kitt Peak	Spacewatch	·	2.6 km	MPC · JPL
422289	2014 SO_{156}	—	March 31, 2009	Mount Lemmon	Mount Lemmon Survey	V	590 m	MPC · JPL
422290	2014 SR_{156}	—	April 5, 2000	Socorro	LINEAR	·	4.8 km	MPC · JPL
422291	2014 SV_{157}	—	October 19, 2010	Mount Lemmon	Mount Lemmon Survey	·	1.4 km	MPC · JPL
422292	2014 SW_{157}	—	September 22, 2003	Kitt Peak	Spacewatch	·	3.2 km	MPC · JPL
422293	2014 SF_{158}	—	October 27, 2003	Kitt Peak	Spacewatch	·	3.3 km	MPC · JPL
422294	2014 SO_{158}	—	September 4, 2003	Kitt Peak	Spacewatch	·	1.9 km	MPC · JPL
422295	2014 SQ_{158}	—	September 30, 2006	Mount Lemmon	Mount Lemmon Survey	·	1.7 km	MPC · JPL
422296	2014 SX_{158}	—	October 1, 2005	Mount Lemmon	Mount Lemmon Survey	·	1.6 km	MPC · JPL
422297	2014 SB_{159}	—	September 20, 2008	Mount Lemmon	Mount Lemmon Survey	·	2.8 km	MPC · JPL
422298	2014 SH_{159}	—	August 10, 2007	Kitt Peak	Spacewatch	·	720 m	MPC · JPL
422299	2014 SJ_{159}	—	November 1, 2000	Kitt Peak	Spacewatch	·	1.9 km	MPC · JPL
422300	2014 SX_{159}	—	September 19, 2003	Campo Imperatore	CINEOS	·	2.0 km	MPC · JPL

== 422301–422400 ==
back to top

Designation			Discovery			Properties		Ref
Permanent	Provisional	Named after	Date	Site	Discoverer(s)	Category	Diam.	Ref
422301	2014 SY_{159}	—	March 13, 2007	Kitt Peak	Spacewatch	BRA	1.5 km	MPC · JPL
422302	2014 SB_{160}	—	August 31, 2005	Kitt Peak	Spacewatch	·	1.7 km	MPC · JPL
422303	2014 SC_{160}	—	September 28, 2003	Socorro	LINEAR	EOS	2.0 km	MPC · JPL
422304	2014 SD_{160}	—	October 9, 2004	Socorro	LINEAR	·	650 m	MPC · JPL
422305	2014 SK_{160}	—	October 25, 2005	Kitt Peak	Spacewatch	·	2.1 km	MPC · JPL
422306	2014 SM_{160}	—	March 27, 2008	Kitt Peak	Spacewatch	(5)	1.3 km	MPC · JPL
422307	2014 SD_{161}	—	September 7, 1999	Kitt Peak	Spacewatch	NYS	1.2 km	MPC · JPL
422308	2014 SO_{161}	—	February 24, 2012	Kitt Peak	Spacewatch	·	2.2 km	MPC · JPL
422309	2014 SH_{164}	—	September 24, 2008	Mount Lemmon	Mount Lemmon Survey	·	3.2 km	MPC · JPL
422310	2014 SJ_{164}	—	October 2, 1997	Caussols	ODAS	·	1.2 km	MPC · JPL
422311	2014 SW_{164}	—	September 19, 2001	Socorro	LINEAR	·	570 m	MPC · JPL
422312	2014 SE_{172}	—	March 26, 2008	Mount Lemmon	Mount Lemmon Survey	·	1.3 km	MPC · JPL
422313	2014 SF_{177}	—	May 21, 2010	WISE	WISE	PHO	2.9 km	MPC · JPL
422314	2014 SD_{179}	—	January 13, 2008	Mount Lemmon	Mount Lemmon Survey	·	900 m	MPC · JPL
422315	2014 SG_{183}	—	June 19, 2006	Mount Lemmon	Mount Lemmon Survey	V	820 m	MPC · JPL
422316	2014 SS_{183}	—	April 7, 2008	Mount Lemmon	Mount Lemmon Survey	WIT	1.2 km	MPC · JPL
422317	2014 SQ_{185}	—	April 19, 1998	Kitt Peak	Spacewatch	·	1.4 km	MPC · JPL
422318	2014 SC_{189}	—	December 21, 2001	Kitt Peak	Spacewatch	AGN	1.3 km	MPC · JPL
422319	2014 SK_{189}	—	October 1, 2003	Kitt Peak	Spacewatch	·	3.4 km	MPC · JPL
422320	2014 SW_{191}	—	March 23, 2006	Kitt Peak	Spacewatch	·	840 m	MPC · JPL
422321	2014 SJ_{195}	—	September 19, 2007	Kitt Peak	Spacewatch	·	740 m	MPC · JPL
422322	2014 SL_{198}	—	December 18, 2001	Socorro	LINEAR	·	660 m	MPC · JPL
422323	2014 SV_{199}	—	October 10, 2004	Kitt Peak	Spacewatch	·	900 m	MPC · JPL
422324	2014 SM_{201}	—	December 29, 2008	Mount Lemmon	Mount Lemmon Survey	·	690 m	MPC · JPL
422325	2014 SA_{204}	—	October 9, 2007	Mount Lemmon	Mount Lemmon Survey	·	1.4 km	MPC · JPL
422326	2014 SJ_{205}	—	November 23, 2006	Kitt Peak	Spacewatch	·	1.4 km	MPC · JPL
422327	2014 SG_{207}	—	April 29, 2000	Kitt Peak	Spacewatch	·	1.8 km	MPC · JPL
422328	2014 SB_{208}	—	August 23, 2003	Palomar	NEAT	·	2.8 km	MPC · JPL
422329	2014 SK_{209}	—	January 8, 2010	Kitt Peak	Spacewatch	CYB	4.4 km	MPC · JPL
422330	2014 SG_{211}	—	December 10, 1998	Kitt Peak	Spacewatch	·	2.9 km	MPC · JPL
422331	2014 SY_{214}	—	October 20, 2003	Kitt Peak	Spacewatch	·	2.2 km	MPC · JPL
422332	2014 SA_{215}	—	September 29, 2003	Socorro	LINEAR	·	2.9 km	MPC · JPL
422333	2014 SQ_{215}	—	August 16, 2006	Siding Spring	SSS	V	740 m	MPC · JPL
422334	2014 SS_{215}	—	November 24, 2003	Anderson Mesa	LONEOS	·	3.0 km	MPC · JPL
422335	2014 SA_{216}	—	April 4, 2010	WISE	WISE	·	4.9 km	MPC · JPL
422336	2014 SX_{220}	—	June 30, 2008	Kitt Peak	Spacewatch	·	4.0 km	MPC · JPL
422337	2014 SL_{221}	—	September 20, 2003	Kitt Peak	Spacewatch	·	2.7 km	MPC · JPL
422338	2014 SM_{221}	—	April 11, 2013	Mount Lemmon	Mount Lemmon Survey	EUN	1.2 km	MPC · JPL
422339	2014 SG_{222}	—	September 15, 2004	Kitt Peak	Spacewatch	KOR	1.7 km	MPC · JPL
422340	2014 SR_{222}	—	October 19, 2003	Kitt Peak	Spacewatch	V	830 m	MPC · JPL
422341	2014 SW_{222}	—	October 9, 2008	Mount Lemmon	Mount Lemmon Survey	·	830 m	MPC · JPL
422342	2014 SO_{223}	—	October 26, 2009	Kitt Peak	Spacewatch	·	2.9 km	MPC · JPL
422343	2014 SY_{224}	—	January 10, 2007	Kitt Peak	Spacewatch	·	1.4 km	MPC · JPL
422344	2014 SJ_{227}	—	January 8, 2002	Socorro	LINEAR	·	1.1 km	MPC · JPL
422345	2014 SY_{227}	—	September 22, 2003	Kitt Peak	Spacewatch	·	1.2 km	MPC · JPL
422346	2014 SB_{228}	—	October 21, 2003	Kitt Peak	Spacewatch	·	1.1 km	MPC · JPL
422347	2014 SK_{228}	—	March 8, 2005	Mount Lemmon	Mount Lemmon Survey	·	830 m	MPC · JPL
422348	2014 SM_{228}	—	October 9, 2004	Kitt Peak	Spacewatch	·	830 m	MPC · JPL
422349	2014 SN_{228}	—	September 19, 2001	Kitt Peak	Spacewatch	EUN	1.1 km	MPC · JPL
422350	2014 SY_{228}	—	October 22, 2003	Kitt Peak	Spacewatch	·	3.3 km	MPC · JPL
422351	2014 SF_{229}	—	November 19, 2009	Kitt Peak	Spacewatch	·	3.0 km	MPC · JPL
422352	2014 SG_{229}	—	January 28, 2000	Kitt Peak	Spacewatch	·	1.0 km	MPC · JPL
422353	2014 SH_{229}	—	October 8, 2008	Mount Lemmon	Mount Lemmon Survey	·	3.2 km	MPC · JPL
422354	2014 SK_{229}	—	October 12, 2009	Mount Lemmon	Mount Lemmon Survey	EOS	2.0 km	MPC · JPL
422355	2014 SN_{229}	—	October 9, 1999	Kitt Peak	Spacewatch	·	2.3 km	MPC · JPL
422356	2014 SQ_{229}	—	September 26, 2008	Mount Lemmon	Mount Lemmon Survey	·	5.1 km	MPC · JPL
422357	2014 SS_{229}	—	August 26, 2000	Socorro	LINEAR	·	2.3 km	MPC · JPL
422358	2014 SW_{229}	—	September 21, 2003	Kitt Peak	Spacewatch	·	3.3 km	MPC · JPL
422359	2014 SB_{230}	—	March 9, 2002	Kitt Peak	Spacewatch	KOR	1.4 km	MPC · JPL
422360	2014 SU_{230}	—	April 9, 2002	Kitt Peak	Spacewatch	·	1.1 km	MPC · JPL
422361	2014 SX_{232}	—	January 16, 2005	Kitt Peak	Spacewatch	·	580 m	MPC · JPL
422362	2014 SY_{232}	—	April 6, 2003	Kitt Peak	Spacewatch	·	2.1 km	MPC · JPL
422363	2014 SB_{233}	—	October 19, 2003	Kitt Peak	Spacewatch	·	2.8 km	MPC · JPL
422364	2014 SM_{240}	—	September 28, 2003	Anderson Mesa	LONEOS	LIX	3.3 km	MPC · JPL
422365	2014 SX_{241}	—	October 9, 2004	Socorro	LINEAR	·	780 m	MPC · JPL
422366	2014 SX_{242}	—	January 21, 2012	Kitt Peak	Spacewatch	·	2.3 km	MPC · JPL
422367	2014 SK_{245}	—	October 23, 2003	Kitt Peak	Spacewatch	LIX	3.1 km	MPC · JPL
422368	2014 SP_{249}	—	August 22, 2004	Siding Spring	SSS	·	2.9 km	MPC · JPL
422369	2014 SG_{250}	—	October 25, 2003	Socorro	LINEAR	·	1.2 km	MPC · JPL
422370	2014 SN_{250}	—	September 17, 2004	Kitt Peak	Spacewatch	·	1.0 km	MPC · JPL
422371	2014 SC_{251}	—	January 12, 2011	Mount Lemmon	Mount Lemmon Survey	·	2.4 km	MPC · JPL
422372	2014 SP_{256}	—	November 6, 2005	Kitt Peak	Spacewatch	HOF	2.3 km	MPC · JPL
422373	2014 SW_{256}	—	September 16, 2009	Kitt Peak	Spacewatch	EOS	1.8 km	MPC · JPL
422374	2014 SB_{257}	—	September 29, 2000	Kitt Peak	Spacewatch	·	2.3 km	MPC · JPL
422375	2014 SB_{258}	—	May 13, 1996	Kitt Peak	Spacewatch	·	3.2 km	MPC · JPL
422376	2014 SE_{258}	—	September 20, 2003	Anderson Mesa	LONEOS	·	1.1 km	MPC · JPL
422377	2014 SF_{258}	—	October 20, 2003	Kitt Peak	Spacewatch	VER	3.4 km	MPC · JPL
422378	2014 SF_{262}	—	October 12, 2006	Siding Spring	SSS	H	500 m	MPC · JPL
422379	2014 SZ_{262}	—	April 3, 2008	Kitt Peak	Spacewatch	·	2.1 km	MPC · JPL
422380	2014 SB_{263}	—	August 5, 2003	Kitt Peak	Spacewatch	·	5.0 km	MPC · JPL
422381	2014 SO_{263}	—	September 3, 2010	Mount Lemmon	Mount Lemmon Survey	MAR	1.5 km	MPC · JPL
422382	2014 SZ_{263}	—	October 28, 2001	Palomar	NEAT	·	2.4 km	MPC · JPL
422383	2014 SH_{264}	—	August 28, 2006	Catalina	CSS	·	1.4 km	MPC · JPL
422384	2014 SJ_{264}	—	January 13, 2005	Kitt Peak	Spacewatch	·	1.1 km	MPC · JPL
422385	2014 SL_{264}	—	May 7, 2006	Mount Lemmon	Mount Lemmon Survey	·	1.9 km	MPC · JPL
422386	2014 SN_{265}	—	November 27, 1995	Kitt Peak	Spacewatch	·	1.5 km	MPC · JPL
422387	2014 SQ_{265}	—	September 29, 2003	Socorro	LINEAR	·	4.1 km	MPC · JPL
422388	2014 SJ_{266}	—	December 27, 2006	Mount Lemmon	Mount Lemmon Survey	·	2.2 km	MPC · JPL
422389	2014 SC_{267}	—	March 15, 2007	Mount Lemmon	Mount Lemmon Survey	·	3.2 km	MPC · JPL
422390	2014 SR_{276}	—	April 30, 2009	Kitt Peak	Spacewatch	MAR	920 m	MPC · JPL
422391	2014 SD_{278}	—	October 26, 2005	Kitt Peak	Spacewatch	·	2.2 km	MPC · JPL
422392	2014 SH_{278}	—	November 19, 2007	Mount Lemmon	Mount Lemmon Survey	·	1.1 km	MPC · JPL
422393	2014 SJ_{278}	—	September 10, 1998	Caussols	ODAS	·	1 km	MPC · JPL
422394	2014 SV_{278}	—	August 21, 2001	Kitt Peak	Spacewatch	·	1.5 km	MPC · JPL
422395	2014 SC_{279}	—	December 9, 2006	Palomar	NEAT	·	1.4 km	MPC · JPL
422396	2014 SD_{279}	—	October 25, 2005	Kitt Peak	Spacewatch	·	2.1 km	MPC · JPL
422397	2014 SE_{279}	—	October 21, 2003	Kitt Peak	Spacewatch	·	3.4 km	MPC · JPL
422398	2014 SF_{279}	—	October 4, 2007	Catalina	CSS	·	810 m	MPC · JPL
422399	2014 SG_{279}	—	November 25, 2005	Kitt Peak	Spacewatch	KOR	1.5 km	MPC · JPL
422400	2014 SU_{279}	—	August 9, 2010	XuYi	PMO NEO Survey Program	NYS	1.2 km	MPC · JPL

== 422401–422500 ==
back to top

Designation			Discovery			Properties		Ref
Permanent	Provisional	Named after	Date	Site	Discoverer(s)	Category	Diam.	Ref
422401	2014 SV_{279}	—	August 15, 2002	Anderson Mesa	LONEOS	·	4.6 km	MPC · JPL
422402	2014 SC_{280}	—	January 20, 2002	Kitt Peak	Spacewatch	·	1.5 km	MPC · JPL
422403	2014 SH_{280}	—	September 27, 2009	Mount Lemmon	Mount Lemmon Survey	·	2.4 km	MPC · JPL
422404	2014 SL_{280}	—	May 20, 2006	Kitt Peak	Spacewatch	·	3.7 km	MPC · JPL
422405	2014 SP_{280}	—	October 22, 2003	Socorro	LINEAR	·	1.2 km	MPC · JPL
422406	2014 SS_{280}	—	October 22, 2005	Kitt Peak	Spacewatch	AGN	1.2 km	MPC · JPL
422407	2014 SV_{280}	—	November 17, 2007	Kitt Peak	Spacewatch	NYS	860 m	MPC · JPL
422408	2014 SX_{280}	—	October 6, 2005	Anderson Mesa	LONEOS	·	2.0 km	MPC · JPL
422409	2014 SC_{281}	—	October 25, 1995	Kitt Peak	Spacewatch	NYS	1.3 km	MPC · JPL
422410	2014 SM_{281}	—	December 1, 2005	Mount Lemmon	Mount Lemmon Survey	·	2.1 km	MPC · JPL
422411	2014 ST_{281}	—	September 10, 2007	Mount Lemmon	Mount Lemmon Survey	·	660 m	MPC · JPL
422412	2014 SE_{282}	—	October 24, 2007	Mount Lemmon	Mount Lemmon Survey	NYS	880 m	MPC · JPL
422413	2014 SJ_{282}	—	September 17, 2010	Catalina	CSS	·	1.3 km	MPC · JPL
422414	2014 SL_{282}	—	August 9, 2002	Cerro Tololo	Deep Ecliptic Survey	HYG	2.6 km	MPC · JPL
422415	2014 SR_{282}	—	May 28, 2008	Mount Lemmon	Mount Lemmon Survey	·	1.9 km	MPC · JPL
422416	2014 SV_{282}	—	December 21, 2006	Kitt Peak	L. H. Wasserman, M. W. Buie	·	1.9 km	MPC · JPL
422417	2014 SA_{283}	—	November 25, 2005	Mount Lemmon	Mount Lemmon Survey	·	1.9 km	MPC · JPL
422418	2014 SC_{283}	—	November 8, 2010	Kitt Peak	Spacewatch	·	1.5 km	MPC · JPL
422419	2014 SN_{283}	—	August 24, 2003	Cerro Tololo	Deep Ecliptic Survey	·	970 m	MPC · JPL
422420	2014 SU_{284}	—	July 25, 2008	Mount Lemmon	Mount Lemmon Survey	·	2.9 km	MPC · JPL
422421	2014 SZ_{285}	—	January 8, 2011	Mount Lemmon	Mount Lemmon Survey	·	2.3 km	MPC · JPL
422422	2014 SJ_{286}	—	March 26, 1995	Kitt Peak	Spacewatch	·	3.7 km	MPC · JPL
422423	2014 SN_{286}	—	August 29, 2005	Palomar	NEAT	JUN	910 m	MPC · JPL
422424	2014 SU_{286}	—	January 31, 2009	Kitt Peak	Spacewatch	·	1.4 km	MPC · JPL
422425	2014 SZ_{286}	—	February 22, 2006	Anderson Mesa	LONEOS	·	3.0 km	MPC · JPL
422426	2014 SF_{287}	—	October 19, 2003	Apache Point	SDSS	EOS	1.8 km	MPC · JPL
422427	2014 SM_{287}	—	October 31, 2000	Socorro	LINEAR	·	2.1 km	MPC · JPL
422428	2014 SU_{287}	—	November 19, 2003	Socorro	LINEAR	LIX	3.7 km	MPC · JPL
422429	2014 SC_{288}	—	March 3, 2000	Kitt Peak	Spacewatch	·	1.5 km	MPC · JPL
422430	2014 SH_{288}	—	October 9, 2004	Kitt Peak	Spacewatch	·	720 m	MPC · JPL
422431	2014 SJ_{289}	—	October 3, 2003	Kitt Peak	Spacewatch	·	3.6 km	MPC · JPL
422432	2014 SY_{290}	—	March 2, 2006	Mount Lemmon	Mount Lemmon Survey	·	3.9 km	MPC · JPL
422433	2014 SF_{292}	—	October 7, 2000	Kitt Peak	Spacewatch	GEF	1.3 km	MPC · JPL
422434	2014 SP_{296}	—	January 10, 2003	Socorro	LINEAR	EUN	1.6 km	MPC · JPL
422435	2014 SQ_{299}	—	September 19, 2001	Socorro	LINEAR	·	1.1 km	MPC · JPL
422436	2014 SF_{300}	—	February 24, 2006	Kitt Peak	Spacewatch	·	790 m	MPC · JPL
422437	2014 SM_{300}	—	March 3, 2005	Kitt Peak	Spacewatch	·	1.1 km	MPC · JPL
422438	2014 SW_{300}	—	September 18, 2006	Catalina	CSS	PHO	1.2 km	MPC · JPL
422439	2014 SA_{301}	—	October 29, 2005	Kitt Peak	Spacewatch	AGN	1.2 km	MPC · JPL
422440	2014 SN_{301}	—	September 26, 2005	Kitt Peak	Spacewatch	·	2.4 km	MPC · JPL
422441	2014 SU_{301}	—	April 9, 2003	Kitt Peak	Spacewatch	·	980 m	MPC · JPL
422442	2014 SV_{301}	—	August 20, 2003	Palomar	NEAT	·	1.1 km	MPC · JPL
422443	2014 SL_{304}	—	October 1, 2003	Kitt Peak	Spacewatch	·	3.6 km	MPC · JPL
422444	2014 SM_{304}	—	May 10, 2008	Siding Spring	SSS	·	3.4 km	MPC · JPL
422445	2014 SQ_{305}	—	November 1, 2005	Mount Lemmon	Mount Lemmon Survey	·	1.8 km	MPC · JPL
422446	2014 SR_{305}	—	October 10, 2007	Kitt Peak	Spacewatch	·	1.0 km	MPC · JPL
422447	2014 SY_{305}	—	September 18, 2010	Mount Lemmon	Mount Lemmon Survey	·	1.4 km	MPC · JPL
422448	2014 SF_{306}	—	October 14, 2007	Mount Lemmon	Mount Lemmon Survey	·	980 m	MPC · JPL
422449	2014 ST_{306}	—	October 21, 2001	Socorro	LINEAR	·	1.9 km	MPC · JPL
422450	2014 SM_{307}	—	February 4, 2006	Kitt Peak	Spacewatch	·	4.4 km	MPC · JPL
422451	2014 SG_{309}	—	October 24, 2005	Kitt Peak	Spacewatch	MRX	1.1 km	MPC · JPL
422452	2014 SM_{309}	—	October 16, 2003	Kitt Peak	Spacewatch	·	3.5 km	MPC · JPL
422453	2014 SQ_{309}	—	October 18, 1998	Kitt Peak	Spacewatch	·	2.9 km	MPC · JPL
422454	2014 SD_{311}	—	May 17, 2005	Mount Lemmon	Mount Lemmon Survey	·	1.4 km	MPC · JPL
422455	2014 SF_{312}	—	October 2, 1999	Kitt Peak	Spacewatch	·	1.1 km	MPC · JPL
422456	2014 SS_{312}	—	September 30, 2006	Mount Lemmon	Mount Lemmon Survey	·	860 m	MPC · JPL
422457	2014 SH_{313}	—	September 14, 2006	Kitt Peak	Spacewatch	3:2 · SHU	5.4 km	MPC · JPL
422458	2014 SJ_{313}	—	June 15, 2005	Mount Lemmon	Mount Lemmon Survey	·	1.2 km	MPC · JPL
422459	2014 SL_{313}	—	December 21, 2003	Kitt Peak	Spacewatch	·	1.1 km	MPC · JPL
422460	2014 SO_{313}	—	September 30, 2003	Kitt Peak	Spacewatch	·	2.3 km	MPC · JPL
422461	2014 SV_{313}	—	May 7, 2006	Mount Lemmon	Mount Lemmon Survey	V	640 m	MPC · JPL
422462	2014 SW_{313}	—	December 19, 2004	Kitt Peak	Spacewatch	·	2.6 km	MPC · JPL
422463	2014 SA_{315}	—	June 21, 2010	Mount Lemmon	Mount Lemmon Survey	·	1.2 km	MPC · JPL
422464	2014 SK_{315}	—	January 15, 2004	Kitt Peak	Spacewatch	NYS	1.1 km	MPC · JPL
422465	2014 SL_{316}	—	November 17, 2009	Kitt Peak	Spacewatch	EOS	2.4 km	MPC · JPL
422466	2014 SB_{317}	—	April 19, 2007	Kitt Peak	Spacewatch	·	4.5 km	MPC · JPL
422467	2014 SS_{317}	—	September 29, 1997	Kitt Peak	Spacewatch	ADE	2.2 km	MPC · JPL
422468	2014 SB_{318}	—	May 2, 2006	Mount Lemmon	Mount Lemmon Survey	HYG	2.9 km	MPC · JPL
422469	2014 ST_{318}	—	February 27, 2006	Mount Lemmon	Mount Lemmon Survey	·	1.4 km	MPC · JPL
422470	2014 SA_{319}	—	September 23, 2008	Mount Lemmon	Mount Lemmon Survey	·	3.9 km	MPC · JPL
422471	2014 SR_{319}	—	September 2, 2010	Mount Lemmon	Mount Lemmon Survey	MAS	650 m	MPC · JPL
422472	2014 SZ_{319}	—	March 23, 2001	Kitt Peak	SKADS	·	1.1 km	MPC · JPL
422473	2014 SP_{320}	—	August 27, 2005	Kitt Peak	Spacewatch	·	1.3 km	MPC · JPL
422474	2014 SR_{325}	—	October 20, 2003	Palomar	NEAT	·	5.4 km	MPC · JPL
422475	2014 ST_{325}	—	September 20, 2008	Catalina	CSS	slow	5.1 km	MPC · JPL
422476	2014 SE_{326}	—	November 18, 2003	Kitt Peak	Spacewatch	·	2.6 km	MPC · JPL
422477	2014 SG_{326}	—	September 19, 2009	Mount Lemmon	Mount Lemmon Survey	AGN	1.1 km	MPC · JPL
422478	2014 SE_{328}	—	October 12, 2007	Mount Lemmon	Mount Lemmon Survey	·	860 m	MPC · JPL
422479	2014 SC_{329}	—	September 23, 2008	Mount Lemmon	Mount Lemmon Survey	·	3.6 km	MPC · JPL
422480	2014 SR_{329}	—	November 20, 2003	Socorro	LINEAR	·	1.6 km	MPC · JPL
422481	2014 SE_{330}	—	October 27, 2005	Kitt Peak	Spacewatch	·	2.6 km	MPC · JPL
422482	2014 SH_{330}	—	March 3, 2006	Mount Lemmon	Mount Lemmon Survey	EOS	2.0 km	MPC · JPL
422483	2014 SW_{330}	—	December 9, 2004	Kitt Peak	Spacewatch	·	680 m	MPC · JPL
422484	2014 SN_{332}	—	August 26, 2005	Palomar	NEAT	·	1.8 km	MPC · JPL
422485	2014 SB_{336}	—	March 26, 2008	Mount Lemmon	Mount Lemmon Survey	·	1.4 km	MPC · JPL
422486	2014 SF_{336}	—	May 1, 2003	Kitt Peak	Spacewatch	526	2.3 km	MPC · JPL
422487	2014 SJ_{337}	—	November 6, 2005	Kitt Peak	Spacewatch	AGN	1.3 km	MPC · JPL
422488	2014 SR_{337}	—	October 20, 2003	Kitt Peak	Spacewatch	NYS	1.0 km	MPC · JPL
422489	2014 SW_{337}	—	October 25, 2005	Mount Lemmon	Mount Lemmon Survey	·	2.0 km	MPC · JPL
422490	2014 SM_{338}	—	November 4, 1999	Kitt Peak	Spacewatch	NYS	1.3 km	MPC · JPL
422491	2014 SA_{339}	—	March 6, 2006	Kitt Peak	Spacewatch	·	2.0 km	MPC · JPL
422492	2014 SR_{341}	—	September 22, 2003	Kitt Peak	Spacewatch	·	3.9 km	MPC · JPL
422493	2014 SO_{342}	—	August 31, 2005	Kitt Peak	Spacewatch	·	2.0 km	MPC · JPL
422494	2014 SV_{342}	—	October 9, 2004	Kitt Peak	Spacewatch	·	610 m	MPC · JPL
422495	2014 SB_{345}	—	November 12, 2001	Socorro	LINEAR	·	1.9 km	MPC · JPL
422496	2014 SZ_{345}	—	October 21, 2006	Mount Lemmon	Mount Lemmon Survey	MAR	1.0 km	MPC · JPL
422497	2014 TJ	—	December 13, 2006	Mount Lemmon	Mount Lemmon Survey	·	1.6 km	MPC · JPL
422498	2014 TY	—	October 1, 2009	Mount Lemmon	Mount Lemmon Survey	H	610 m	MPC · JPL
422499	2014 TF_{1}	—	October 30, 2005	Catalina	CSS	·	2.6 km	MPC · JPL
422500	2014 TH_{2}	—	October 19, 2003	Kitt Peak	Spacewatch	·	4.4 km	MPC · JPL

== 422501–422600 ==
back to top

Designation			Discovery			Properties		Ref
Permanent	Provisional	Named after	Date	Site	Discoverer(s)	Category	Diam.	Ref
422501	2014 TJ_{2}	—	February 9, 2005	Mount Lemmon	Mount Lemmon Survey	·	2.4 km	MPC · JPL
422502	2014 TK_{3}	—	August 4, 2010	WISE	WISE	·	1.5 km	MPC · JPL
422503	2014 TP_{3}	—	December 18, 2007	Mount Lemmon	Mount Lemmon Survey	NYS	1.1 km	MPC · JPL
422504	2014 TR_{3}	—	November 18, 2003	Kitt Peak	Spacewatch	·	3.8 km	MPC · JPL
422505	2014 TX_{3}	—	September 16, 2003	Kitt Peak	Spacewatch	·	840 m	MPC · JPL
422506	2014 TY_{3}	—	September 7, 2004	Kitt Peak	Spacewatch	·	510 m	MPC · JPL
422507	2014 TD_{4}	—	October 29, 2003	Kitt Peak	Spacewatch	·	1.5 km	MPC · JPL
422508	2014 TK_{5}	—	September 18, 2003	Kitt Peak	Spacewatch	·	790 m	MPC · JPL
422509	2014 TP_{5}	—	October 15, 2004	Kitt Peak	Spacewatch	KOR	1.3 km	MPC · JPL
422510	2014 TQ_{5}	—	November 20, 2009	Kitt Peak	Spacewatch	·	2.2 km	MPC · JPL
422511	2014 TT_{5}	—	December 24, 2006	Mount Lemmon	Mount Lemmon Survey	(5)	1.4 km	MPC · JPL
422512	2014 TA_{6}	—	October 9, 2001	Kitt Peak	Spacewatch	·	1.6 km	MPC · JPL
422513	2014 TO_{6}	—	October 24, 2003	Socorro	LINEAR	·	3.5 km	MPC · JPL
422514	2014 TP_{6}	—	November 3, 2007	Mount Lemmon	Mount Lemmon Survey	·	750 m	MPC · JPL
422515	2014 TM_{7}	—	August 30, 2005	Kitt Peak	Spacewatch	·	1.4 km	MPC · JPL
422516	2014 TX_{7}	—	April 9, 2002	Palomar	NEAT	·	1.0 km	MPC · JPL
422517	2014 TD_{8}	—	November 10, 2009	Kitt Peak	Spacewatch	·	2.0 km	MPC · JPL
422518	2014 TK_{8}	—	December 16, 2007	Mount Lemmon	Mount Lemmon Survey	·	1.2 km	MPC · JPL
422519	2014 TN_{8}	—	September 28, 2008	Catalina	CSS	·	3.2 km	MPC · JPL
422520	2014 TG_{9}	—	October 4, 2004	Kitt Peak	Spacewatch	·	2.2 km	MPC · JPL
422521	2014 TN_{9}	—	September 25, 2009	Mount Lemmon	Mount Lemmon Survey	·	2.9 km	MPC · JPL
422522	2014 TP_{9}	—	August 28, 2006	Catalina	CSS	·	1.1 km	MPC · JPL
422523	2014 TW_{10}	—	December 13, 2004	Campo Imperatore	CINEOS	·	2.7 km	MPC · JPL
422524	2014 TZ_{10}	—	December 29, 2008	Kitt Peak	Spacewatch	·	1.0 km	MPC · JPL
422525	2014 TL_{11}	—	October 29, 2005	Catalina	CSS	·	2.4 km	MPC · JPL
422526	2014 TE_{12}	—	October 26, 2009	Mount Lemmon	Mount Lemmon Survey	·	2.7 km	MPC · JPL
422527	2014 TB_{13}	—	December 11, 2004	Kitt Peak	Spacewatch	·	3.5 km	MPC · JPL
422528	2014 TX_{18}	—	November 4, 2005	Kitt Peak	Spacewatch	AGN	1.2 km	MPC · JPL
422529	2014 TY_{18}	—	December 27, 2006	Mount Lemmon	Mount Lemmon Survey	·	1.6 km	MPC · JPL
422530	2014 TO_{19}	—	September 16, 2003	Kitt Peak	Spacewatch	·	4.2 km	MPC · JPL
422531	2014 TS_{19}	—	September 28, 2003	Kitt Peak	Spacewatch	·	2.6 km	MPC · JPL
422532	2014 TV_{19}	—	October 1, 2003	Kitt Peak	Spacewatch	EOS	2.0 km	MPC · JPL
422533	2014 TF_{20}	—	November 5, 2005	Mount Lemmon	Mount Lemmon Survey	AGN	1.0 km	MPC · JPL
422534	2014 TM_{20}	—	November 14, 1998	Kitt Peak	Spacewatch	THM	2.7 km	MPC · JPL
422535	2014 TT_{20}	—	September 7, 1999	Socorro	LINEAR	MAS	780 m	MPC · JPL
422536	2014 TG_{21}	—	October 2, 2003	Kitt Peak	Spacewatch	THM	2.4 km	MPC · JPL
422537	2014 TH_{23}	—	October 23, 1997	Kitt Peak	Spacewatch	·	2.2 km	MPC · JPL
422538	2014 TU_{23}	—	September 17, 2003	Kitt Peak	Spacewatch	·	810 m	MPC · JPL
422539	2014 TC_{24}	—	November 19, 2003	Kitt Peak	Spacewatch	NYS	950 m	MPC · JPL
422540	2014 TK_{26}	—	September 15, 1996	Kitt Peak	Spacewatch	·	670 m	MPC · JPL
422541	2014 TR_{26}	—	May 5, 2006	Kitt Peak	Spacewatch	NYS	820 m	MPC · JPL
422542	2014 TZ_{26}	—	December 19, 2004	Mount Lemmon	Mount Lemmon Survey	·	2.5 km	MPC · JPL
422543	2014 TM_{27}	—	October 14, 2010	Mount Lemmon	Mount Lemmon Survey	·	1.3 km	MPC · JPL
422544	2014 TL_{28}	—	March 26, 2006	Kitt Peak	Spacewatch	·	4.0 km	MPC · JPL
422545	2014 TM_{29}	—	February 27, 2006	Kitt Peak	Spacewatch	·	3.5 km	MPC · JPL
422546	2014 TP_{29}	—	November 10, 2004	Kitt Peak	Spacewatch	·	2.1 km	MPC · JPL
422547	2014 TY_{29}	—	November 25, 2006	Kitt Peak	Spacewatch	·	1.6 km	MPC · JPL
422548	2014 TA_{30}	—	October 24, 2000	Socorro	LINEAR	GEF	1.6 km	MPC · JPL
422549	2014 TG_{30}	—	November 10, 2004	Kitt Peak	Deep Ecliptic Survey	·	2.5 km	MPC · JPL
422550	2014 TH_{32}	—	October 12, 1993	Kitt Peak	Spacewatch	·	1.4 km	MPC · JPL
422551	2014 TC_{33}	—	September 28, 2006	Kitt Peak	Spacewatch	·	2.3 km	MPC · JPL
422552	2014 TX_{33}	—	December 18, 2003	Socorro	LINEAR	·	3.8 km	MPC · JPL
422553	2014 TY_{35}	—	January 9, 2000	Kitt Peak	Spacewatch	·	1.6 km	MPC · JPL
422554	2014 TV_{36}	—	November 6, 2010	Mount Lemmon	Mount Lemmon Survey	(5)	1.4 km	MPC · JPL
422555	2014 TX_{36}	—	April 12, 2002	Palomar	NEAT	H	640 m	MPC · JPL
422556	2014 TY_{36}	—	May 14, 2012	Mount Lemmon	Mount Lemmon Survey	·	3.2 km	MPC · JPL
422557	2014 TZ_{36}	—	April 13, 2010	WISE	WISE	LIX	3.3 km	MPC · JPL
422558	2014 TB_{37}	—	October 21, 2003	Socorro	LINEAR	·	1.5 km	MPC · JPL
422559	2014 TZ_{37}	—	October 17, 2001	Socorro	LINEAR	·	2.1 km	MPC · JPL
422560	2014 TY_{38}	—	August 16, 2006	Siding Spring	SSS	·	1.2 km	MPC · JPL
422561	2014 TH_{39}	—	November 19, 2003	Socorro	LINEAR	LIX	3.6 km	MPC · JPL
422562	2014 TD_{40}	—	November 25, 2000	Kitt Peak	Spacewatch	HOF	2.6 km	MPC · JPL
422563	2014 TK_{40}	—	October 24, 2003	Kitt Peak	Spacewatch	·	3.7 km	MPC · JPL
422564	2014 TR_{40}	—	November 4, 2007	Mount Lemmon	Mount Lemmon Survey	NYS	1.8 km	MPC · JPL
422565	2014 TU_{40}	—	April 8, 1997	Kitt Peak	Spacewatch	615	2.0 km	MPC · JPL
422566	2014 TB_{43}	—	November 30, 2003	Kitt Peak	Spacewatch	THM	1.9 km	MPC · JPL
422567	2014 TE_{45}	—	September 25, 2003	Palomar	NEAT	·	2.8 km	MPC · JPL
422568	2014 TT_{47}	—	March 19, 1999	Kitt Peak	Spacewatch	·	780 m	MPC · JPL
422569	2014 TV_{47}	—	April 11, 1996	Kitt Peak	Spacewatch	·	1.6 km	MPC · JPL
422570	2014 TA_{49}	—	December 30, 2008	Kitt Peak	Spacewatch	·	1.8 km	MPC · JPL
422571	2014 TB_{49}	—	September 26, 2003	Socorro	LINEAR	·	1.3 km	MPC · JPL
422572	2014 TC_{49}	—	December 16, 1995	Kitt Peak	Spacewatch	·	1.3 km	MPC · JPL
422573	2014 TT_{53}	—	October 19, 2003	Kitt Peak	Spacewatch	EOS	1.8 km	MPC · JPL
422574	2014 TX_{53}	—	September 19, 1998	Caussols	ODAS	·	2.3 km	MPC · JPL
422575	2014 TC_{54}	—	March 5, 2006	Kitt Peak	Spacewatch	L5	8.5 km	MPC · JPL
422576	2014 TL_{54}	—	February 24, 2006	Kitt Peak	Spacewatch	·	1.9 km	MPC · JPL
422577	2014 TM_{54}	—	July 3, 2005	Mount Lemmon	Mount Lemmon Survey	·	1.2 km	MPC · JPL
422578	2014 TE_{56}	—	February 18, 2005	La Silla	A. Boattini, H. Scholl	·	3.1 km	MPC · JPL
422579	2014 TQ_{56}	—	November 22, 2005	Kitt Peak	Spacewatch	·	2.0 km	MPC · JPL
422580	2014 TB_{57}	—	August 21, 2004	Siding Spring	SSS	AGN	1.3 km	MPC · JPL
422581	2014 TC_{57}	—	October 10, 2007	Mount Lemmon	Mount Lemmon Survey	·	840 m	MPC · JPL
422582	2014 TH_{57}	—	September 19, 2003	Kitt Peak	Spacewatch	EOS	1.9 km	MPC · JPL
422583	2014 TK_{58}	—	March 29, 2000	Kitt Peak	Spacewatch	EUN	1.2 km	MPC · JPL
422584	2014 TY_{58}	—	September 17, 2003	Kitt Peak	Spacewatch	·	2.1 km	MPC · JPL
422585	2014 TL_{59}	—	August 11, 2001	Palomar	NEAT	·	1.9 km	MPC · JPL
422586	2014 TN_{59}	—	August 14, 2001	Haleakala	NEAT	·	1.7 km	MPC · JPL
422587	2014 TG_{62}	—	August 13, 2010	Kitt Peak	Spacewatch	·	1.0 km	MPC · JPL
422588	2014 TY_{62}	—	February 10, 2010	WISE	WISE	EMA	3.9 km	MPC · JPL
422589	2014 TZ_{62}	—	September 16, 2004	Kitt Peak	Spacewatch	·	630 m	MPC · JPL
422590	2014 TF_{65}	—	October 20, 2003	Socorro	LINEAR	·	3.2 km	MPC · JPL
422591	2014 TS_{65}	—	September 26, 2003	Apache Point	SDSS	EOS	2.2 km	MPC · JPL
422592	2014 TH_{67}	—	August 5, 2002	Palomar	NEAT	(1298)	3.3 km	MPC · JPL
422593	2014 TG_{68}	—	November 6, 2010	Kitt Peak	Spacewatch	·	1.2 km	MPC · JPL
422594	2014 TM_{68}	—	March 28, 2001	Kitt Peak	Spacewatch	·	1.5 km	MPC · JPL
422595	2014 TT_{68}	—	May 10, 2003	Kitt Peak	Spacewatch	·	2.8 km	MPC · JPL
422596	2014 TS_{69}	—	November 15, 2006	Mount Lemmon	Mount Lemmon Survey	(5)	1.6 km	MPC · JPL
422597	2014 TT_{69}	—	December 12, 2006	Mount Lemmon	Mount Lemmon Survey	·	1.3 km	MPC · JPL
422598	2014 TY_{69}	—	July 9, 2010	WISE	WISE	SUL	2.2 km	MPC · JPL
422599	2014 TZ_{69}	—	September 16, 1998	Kitt Peak	Spacewatch	·	1.8 km	MPC · JPL
422600	2014 TA_{70}	—	October 29, 2003	Kitt Peak	Spacewatch	·	2.8 km	MPC · JPL

== 422601–422700 ==
back to top

Designation			Discovery			Properties		Ref
Permanent	Provisional	Named after	Date	Site	Discoverer(s)	Category	Diam.	Ref
422601	2014 TF_{70}	—	March 5, 2006	Kitt Peak	Spacewatch	TEL	1.7 km	MPC · JPL
422602	2014 TK_{70}	—	December 13, 1999	Kitt Peak	Spacewatch	·	2.6 km	MPC · JPL
422603	2014 TJ_{71}	—	January 1, 2001	Kitt Peak	Spacewatch	NYS	930 m	MPC · JPL
422604	2014 TQ_{71}	—	October 19, 2003	Apache Point	SDSS	·	1.1 km	MPC · JPL
422605	2014 TX_{71}	—	February 1, 2005	Kitt Peak	Spacewatch	HYG	2.6 km	MPC · JPL
422606	2014 TY_{71}	—	November 27, 2009	Mount Lemmon	Mount Lemmon Survey	·	1.9 km	MPC · JPL
422607	2014 TG_{74}	—	January 22, 1998	Kitt Peak	Spacewatch	·	800 m	MPC · JPL
422608	2014 TL_{74}	—	August 15, 2009	Kitt Peak	Spacewatch	PAD	1.6 km	MPC · JPL
422609	2014 TR_{74}	—	December 21, 2004	Catalina	CSS	·	720 m	MPC · JPL
422610	2014 TY_{74}	—	January 1, 2008	Kitt Peak	Spacewatch	·	910 m	MPC · JPL
422611	2014 TB_{82}	—	September 28, 2003	Kitt Peak	Spacewatch	·	1.9 km	MPC · JPL
422612	2014 TS_{82}	—	November 9, 2009	Mount Lemmon	Mount Lemmon Survey	EOS	5.0 km	MPC · JPL
422613	2014 UA_{2}	—	April 23, 2007	Kitt Peak	Spacewatch	·	3.1 km	MPC · JPL
422614	2014 UZ_{2}	—	November 24, 2011	Mount Lemmon	Mount Lemmon Survey	·	880 m	MPC · JPL
422615	2014 UK_{4}	—	September 16, 2003	Kitt Peak	Spacewatch	·	3.5 km	MPC · JPL
422616	2014 UN_{6}	—	November 1, 2005	Mount Lemmon	Mount Lemmon Survey	·	2.1 km	MPC · JPL
422617	2014 UH_{10}	—	September 29, 2008	Kitt Peak	Spacewatch	·	2.6 km	MPC · JPL
422618	2014 UJ_{10}	—	October 23, 2006	Mount Lemmon	Mount Lemmon Survey	·	1.1 km	MPC · JPL
422619	2014 UW_{10}	—	February 7, 1999	Kitt Peak	Spacewatch	·	4.2 km	MPC · JPL
422620	2014 UV_{12}	—	June 21, 2007	Mount Lemmon	Mount Lemmon Survey	·	3.8 km	MPC · JPL
422621	2014 UE_{13}	—	November 8, 2010	Mount Lemmon	Mount Lemmon Survey	·	1.2 km	MPC · JPL
422622	2014 UD_{15}	—	November 11, 2009	Kitt Peak	Spacewatch	·	2.6 km	MPC · JPL
422623	2014 UR_{19}	—	March 30, 2008	Kitt Peak	Spacewatch	MAR	1.1 km	MPC · JPL
422624	2014 UY_{20}	—	October 14, 2009	Mount Lemmon	Mount Lemmon Survey	·	2.0 km	MPC · JPL
422625	2014 UZ_{24}	—	March 10, 2005	Catalina	CSS	·	1.5 km	MPC · JPL
422626	2014 UD_{28}	—	March 28, 2011	Mount Lemmon	Mount Lemmon Survey	·	1.8 km	MPC · JPL
422627	2014 UD_{40}	—	January 17, 2007	Kitt Peak	Spacewatch	·	1.6 km	MPC · JPL
422628	2014 UV_{102}	—	August 28, 2005	Kitt Peak	Spacewatch	·	1.6 km	MPC · JPL
422629	2014 UK_{116}	—	November 6, 2002	Socorro	LINEAR	·	4.9 km	MPC · JPL
422630	2036 P-L	—	September 24, 1960	Palomar	C. J. van Houten, I. van Houten-Groeneveld, T. Gehrels	(5)	1.6 km	MPC · JPL
422631	4165 P-L	—	September 24, 1960	Palomar	C. J. van Houten, I. van Houten-Groeneveld, T. Gehrels	·	640 m	MPC · JPL
422632	6510 P-L	—	September 24, 1960	Palomar	C. J. van Houten, I. van Houten-Groeneveld, T. Gehrels	·	2.5 km	MPC · JPL
422633	1349 T-2	—	September 29, 1973	Palomar	C. J. van Houten, I. van Houten-Groeneveld, T. Gehrels	·	1.2 km	MPC · JPL
422634	2401 T-3	—	October 16, 1977	Palomar	C. J. van Houten, I. van Houten-Groeneveld, T. Gehrels	·	1.3 km	MPC · JPL
422635	2604 T-3	—	October 16, 1977	Palomar	C. J. van Houten, I. van Houten-Groeneveld, T. Gehrels	·	1.2 km	MPC · JPL
422636	3375 T-3	—	October 16, 1977	Palomar	C. J. van Houten, I. van Houten-Groeneveld, T. Gehrels	·	650 m	MPC · JPL
422637	1985 WA	—	November 16, 1985	Palomar	C. S. Shoemaker	T_{j} (2.99) · AMO +1km · critical	840 m	MPC · JPL
422638	1994 CB	—	February 3, 1994	Kitt Peak	Spacewatch	APO	190 m	MPC · JPL
422639	1995 SQ_{9}	—	September 17, 1995	Kitt Peak	Spacewatch	·	920 m	MPC · JPL
422640	1995 SF_{14}	—	September 18, 1995	Kitt Peak	Spacewatch	·	3.7 km	MPC · JPL
422641	1995 SC_{15}	—	September 18, 1995	Kitt Peak	Spacewatch	·	1.0 km	MPC · JPL
422642	1995 SG_{29}	—	September 20, 1995	Kitt Peak	Spacewatch	NYS	1.0 km	MPC · JPL
422643	1995 SA_{31}	—	September 20, 1995	Kitt Peak	Spacewatch	MAS	660 m	MPC · JPL
422644	1995 SK_{59}	—	September 19, 1995	Kitt Peak	Spacewatch	·	1.7 km	MPC · JPL
422645	1995 UB_{56}	—	October 23, 1995	Kitt Peak	Spacewatch	·	1.4 km	MPC · JPL
422646	1996 RW_{13}	—	September 8, 1996	Kitt Peak	Spacewatch	·	600 m	MPC · JPL
422647	1996 RC_{15}	—	September 6, 1996	Kitt Peak	Spacewatch	EUN	1.3 km	MPC · JPL
422648	1996 VW_{6}	—	November 11, 1996	Kitt Peak	Spacewatch	·	2.0 km	MPC · JPL
422649	1996 VS_{22}	—	November 9, 1996	Kitt Peak	Spacewatch	·	2.9 km	MPC · JPL
422650	1996 VC_{32}	—	November 4, 1996	Kitt Peak	Spacewatch	·	620 m	MPC · JPL
422651	1997 CR_{3}	—	February 2, 1997	Kitt Peak	Spacewatch	·	1.4 km	MPC · JPL
422652	1997 CB_{25}	—	February 3, 1997	Kitt Peak	Spacewatch	·	1.1 km	MPC · JPL
422653	1997 PO	—	August 1, 1997	Haleakala	NEAT	T_{j} (2.97)	3.5 km	MPC · JPL
422654	1997 WS_{29}	—	November 22, 1997	Kitt Peak	Spacewatch	·	4.0 km	MPC · JPL
422655	1997 YW_{12}	—	December 27, 1997	Kitt Peak	Spacewatch	·	580 m	MPC · JPL
422656	1998 DL	—	February 18, 1998	Modra	A. Galád, Pravda, A.	·	4.0 km	MPC · JPL
422657	1998 HN	—	April 17, 1998	Kitt Peak	Spacewatch	·	610 m	MPC · JPL
422658	1998 KC_{11}	—	May 22, 1998	Kitt Peak	Spacewatch	·	870 m	MPC · JPL
422659	1998 LD	—	June 3, 1998	Socorro	LINEAR	AMO	360 m	MPC · JPL
422660	1998 TM_{22}	—	October 13, 1998	Kitt Peak	Spacewatch	·	1.2 km	MPC · JPL
422661	1998 VA_{41}	—	November 14, 1998	Kitt Peak	Spacewatch	KOR	1.3 km	MPC · JPL
422662	1999 JZ_{107}	—	May 13, 1999	Socorro	LINEAR	·	970 m	MPC · JPL
422663	1999 RQ_{220}	—	September 5, 1999	Catalina	CSS	·	1.2 km	MPC · JPL
422664	1999 TP_{14}	—	October 4, 1999	Ondřejov	L. Kotková	·	1.2 km	MPC · JPL
422665	1999 TT_{39}	—	October 3, 1999	Catalina	CSS	·	1.2 km	MPC · JPL
422666	1999 TK_{233}	—	October 3, 1999	Socorro	LINEAR	·	890 m	MPC · JPL
422667	1999 TB_{289}	—	October 10, 1999	Socorro	LINEAR	·	1.2 km	MPC · JPL
422668	1999 UM_{28}	—	October 31, 1999	Kitt Peak	Spacewatch	·	770 m	MPC · JPL
422669	1999 UF_{43}	—	October 28, 1999	Catalina	CSS	·	990 m	MPC · JPL
422670	1999 UF_{60}	—	October 19, 1999	Kitt Peak	Spacewatch	·	710 m	MPC · JPL
422671	1999 VA_{77}	—	November 5, 1999	Kitt Peak	Spacewatch	V	620 m	MPC · JPL
422672	1999 VZ_{99}	—	November 9, 1999	Socorro	LINEAR	·	2.4 km	MPC · JPL
422673	1999 VF_{117}	—	October 21, 1999	Socorro	LINEAR	DOR	2.6 km	MPC · JPL
422674	1999 VQ_{119}	—	October 13, 1999	Socorro	LINEAR	AGN	1.1 km	MPC · JPL
422675	1999 VS_{130}	—	November 9, 1999	Kitt Peak	Spacewatch	·	1.9 km	MPC · JPL
422676	1999 VC_{136}	—	November 9, 1999	Socorro	LINEAR	NYS	1.1 km	MPC · JPL
422677	1999 VW_{181}	—	November 9, 1999	Socorro	LINEAR	MAS	730 m	MPC · JPL
422678	1999 VP_{215}	—	November 3, 1999	Kitt Peak	Spacewatch	·	2.0 km	MPC · JPL
422679	1999 VU_{225}	—	November 5, 1999	Socorro	LINEAR	·	1.5 km	MPC · JPL
422680	1999 WG_{16}	—	November 9, 1999	Kitt Peak	Spacewatch	·	1.4 km	MPC · JPL
422681	1999 WP_{17}	—	November 30, 1999	Kitt Peak	Spacewatch	·	1.3 km	MPC · JPL
422682	1999 WM_{25}	—	November 29, 1999	Kitt Peak	Spacewatch	·	770 m	MPC · JPL
422683	1999 XB_{15}	—	December 6, 1999	Socorro	LINEAR	·	1.7 km	MPC · JPL
422684	1999 XB_{146}	—	December 7, 1999	Kitt Peak	Spacewatch	KOR	1.3 km	MPC · JPL
422685	1999 XK_{148}	—	December 7, 1999	Kitt Peak	Spacewatch	NYS	1.1 km	MPC · JPL
422686	2000 AC_{6}	—	January 4, 2000	Socorro	LINEAR	ATE · PHA	180 m	MPC · JPL
422687	2000 AR_{252}	—	January 7, 2000	Kitt Peak	Spacewatch	·	1.1 km	MPC · JPL
422688	2000 BC_{20}	—	January 26, 2000	Kitt Peak	Spacewatch	·	1.2 km	MPC · JPL
422689	2000 CK_{68}	—	February 1, 2000	Kitt Peak	Spacewatch	MAS	630 m	MPC · JPL
422690	2000 FS_{51}	—	March 29, 2000	Kitt Peak	Spacewatch	·	3.2 km	MPC · JPL
422691	2000 GA	—	April 1, 2000	Kitt Peak	Spacewatch	·	1.7 km	MPC · JPL
422692	2000 GW_{51}	—	April 5, 2000	Socorro	LINEAR	·	1.1 km	MPC · JPL
422693	2000 GP_{144}	—	April 7, 2000	Kitt Peak	Spacewatch	·	2.4 km	MPC · JPL
422694	2000 HD_{94}	—	April 29, 2000	Socorro	LINEAR	·	2.6 km	MPC · JPL
422695	2000 JZ_{82}	—	May 7, 2000	Socorro	LINEAR	·	3.4 km	MPC · JPL
422696	2000 KB_{40}	—	May 25, 2000	Kitt Peak	Spacewatch	·	660 m	MPC · JPL
422697	2000 OG_{9}	—	August 31, 2000	Kitt Peak	Spacewatch	·	1.5 km	MPC · JPL
422698	2000 OW_{56}	—	August 1, 2000	Socorro	LINEAR	·	2.0 km	MPC · JPL
422699	2000 PD_{3}	—	August 1, 2000	Socorro	LINEAR	APO +1km · PHA	620 m	MPC · JPL
422700	2000 QB_{35}	—	August 27, 2000	Ondřejov	P. Kušnirák, P. Pravec	·	1.7 km	MPC · JPL

== 422701–422800 ==
back to top

Designation			Discovery			Properties		Ref
Permanent	Provisional	Named after	Date	Site	Discoverer(s)	Category	Diam.	Ref
422701	2000 QJ_{87}	—	August 25, 2000	Socorro	LINEAR	ADE	2.4 km	MPC · JPL
422702	2000 SN_{9}	—	September 23, 2000	Socorro	LINEAR	H	790 m	MPC · JPL
422703	2000 SG_{24}	—	September 24, 2000	Socorro	LINEAR	·	3.4 km	MPC · JPL
422704	2000 SH_{42}	—	September 24, 2000	Socorro	LINEAR	EUN	1.3 km	MPC · JPL
422705	2000 SQ_{52}	—	September 24, 2000	Socorro	LINEAR	·	950 m	MPC · JPL
422706	2000 SP_{105}	—	September 24, 2000	Socorro	LINEAR	·	1.8 km	MPC · JPL
422707	2000 SX_{128}	—	September 25, 2000	Socorro	LINEAR	·	1.5 km	MPC · JPL
422708	2000 SS_{132}	—	September 23, 2000	Socorro	LINEAR	EUN	1.4 km	MPC · JPL
422709	2000 SK_{207}	—	September 24, 2000	Socorro	LINEAR	·	2.3 km	MPC · JPL
422710	2000 SX_{240}	—	September 27, 2000	Socorro	LINEAR	H	690 m	MPC · JPL
422711	2000 SR_{325}	—	September 24, 2000	Socorro	LINEAR	T_{j} (2.99) · CYB	3.9 km	MPC · JPL
422712	2000 SY_{332}	—	September 26, 2000	Socorro	LINEAR	·	2.1 km	MPC · JPL
422713	2000 TO_{13}	—	October 1, 2000	Socorro	LINEAR	·	690 m	MPC · JPL
422714	2000 UB_{13}	—	October 25, 2000	Socorro	LINEAR	·	840 m	MPC · JPL
422715	2000 WE_{6}	—	November 16, 2000	Kitt Peak	Spacewatch	·	1.7 km	MPC · JPL
422716	2000 WA_{106}	—	November 29, 2000	Kitt Peak	Spacewatch	·	820 m	MPC · JPL
422717	2000 YA_{28}	—	December 28, 2000	Socorro	LINEAR	·	590 m	MPC · JPL
422718	2000 YG_{122}	—	December 28, 2000	Kitt Peak	Spacewatch	·	3.1 km	MPC · JPL
422719	2001 AU_{1}	—	January 2, 2001	Socorro	LINEAR	·	960 m	MPC · JPL
422720	2001 BG_{42}	—	January 21, 2001	Socorro	LINEAR	·	2.2 km	MPC · JPL
422721	2001 DC_{3}	—	February 16, 2001	Socorro	LINEAR	H	560 m	MPC · JPL
422722	2001 DP_{35}	—	February 19, 2001	Socorro	LINEAR	·	2.2 km	MPC · JPL
422723	2001 ER_{9}	—	March 2, 2001	Anderson Mesa	LONEOS	·	2.4 km	MPC · JPL
422724	2001 FK_{58}	—	March 23, 2001	Anderson Mesa	LONEOS	·	1.0 km	MPC · JPL
422725	2001 FM_{89}	—	March 27, 2001	Kitt Peak	Spacewatch	NYS	910 m	MPC · JPL
422726	2001 FX_{140}	—	March 22, 2001	Kitt Peak	Spacewatch	·	980 m	MPC · JPL
422727	2001 FN_{147}	—	March 24, 2001	Anderson Mesa	LONEOS	·	3.3 km	MPC · JPL
422728	2001 FD_{168}	—	March 20, 2001	Haleakala	NEAT	·	760 m	MPC · JPL
422729	2001 NC_{15}	—	July 13, 2001	Palomar	NEAT	·	1.3 km	MPC · JPL
422730	2001 QL_{53}	—	August 16, 2001	Socorro	LINEAR	PHO	2.4 km	MPC · JPL
422731	2001 QH_{100}	—	August 18, 2001	Palomar	NEAT	·	1.6 km	MPC · JPL
422732	2001 QC_{210}	—	August 23, 2001	Anderson Mesa	LONEOS	·	1.3 km	MPC · JPL
422733	2001 QU_{229}	—	August 24, 2001	Anderson Mesa	LONEOS	·	1.8 km	MPC · JPL
422734	2001 RY_{7}	—	September 8, 2001	Socorro	LINEAR	·	1.0 km	MPC · JPL
422735	2001 RN_{88}	—	September 11, 2001	Anderson Mesa	LONEOS	·	1.6 km	MPC · JPL
422736	2001 RP_{118}	—	September 12, 2001	Socorro	LINEAR	·	970 m	MPC · JPL
422737	2001 RF_{136}	—	September 12, 2001	Socorro	LINEAR	·	1.5 km	MPC · JPL
422738	2001 SO_{39}	—	September 16, 2001	Socorro	LINEAR	EUN	1.2 km	MPC · JPL
422739	2001 SP_{49}	—	September 16, 2001	Socorro	LINEAR	(5)	1.2 km	MPC · JPL
422740	2001 SV_{89}	—	September 20, 2001	Socorro	LINEAR	·	3.3 km	MPC · JPL
422741	2001 SS_{98}	—	September 20, 2001	Socorro	LINEAR	·	690 m	MPC · JPL
422742	2001 SO_{103}	—	September 20, 2001	Socorro	LINEAR	·	2.8 km	MPC · JPL
422743	2001 SU_{111}	—	September 20, 2001	Socorro	LINEAR	·	1.4 km	MPC · JPL
422744	2001 SZ_{174}	—	September 16, 2001	Socorro	LINEAR	(5)	980 m	MPC · JPL
422745	2001 SV_{193}	—	September 19, 2001	Socorro	LINEAR	·	1.4 km	MPC · JPL
422746	2001 SA_{194}	—	August 25, 2001	Kitt Peak	Spacewatch	·	2.8 km	MPC · JPL
422747	2001 SJ_{203}	—	September 19, 2001	Socorro	LINEAR	·	940 m	MPC · JPL
422748	2001 SN_{204}	—	September 19, 2001	Socorro	LINEAR	·	650 m	MPC · JPL
422749	2001 SY_{222}	—	September 11, 2001	Kitt Peak	Spacewatch	·	3.6 km	MPC · JPL
422750	2001 SP_{257}	—	September 17, 2001	Anderson Mesa	LONEOS	·	1.3 km	MPC · JPL
422751	2001 SU_{267}	—	September 25, 2001	Desert Eagle	W. K. Y. Yeung	·	1.4 km	MPC · JPL
422752	2001 SD_{277}	—	September 26, 2001	Socorro	LINEAR	·	3.0 km	MPC · JPL
422753	2001 SA_{290}	—	September 29, 2001	Palomar	NEAT	·	1.6 km	MPC · JPL
422754	2001 SY_{308}	—	September 22, 2001	Socorro	LINEAR	(5)	940 m	MPC · JPL
422755	2001 ST_{318}	—	September 21, 2001	Socorro	LINEAR	·	1.4 km	MPC · JPL
422756	2001 SP_{322}	—	September 25, 2001	Socorro	LINEAR	EUN	1.1 km	MPC · JPL
422757	2001 TL_{7}	—	October 15, 2001	Haleakala	NEAT	·	1.3 km	MPC · JPL
422758	2001 TU_{116}	—	October 14, 2001	Socorro	LINEAR	ADE	2.7 km	MPC · JPL
422759	2001 TR_{154}	—	October 15, 2001	Palomar	NEAT	·	1.2 km	MPC · JPL
422760	2001 TC_{159}	—	October 11, 2001	Palomar	NEAT	·	1.0 km	MPC · JPL
422761	2001 TP_{183}	—	October 14, 2001	Socorro	LINEAR	·	830 m	MPC · JPL
422762	2001 TG_{246}	—	October 14, 2001	Apache Point	SDSS	·	850 m	MPC · JPL
422763	2001 TX_{255}	—	October 14, 2001	Apache Point	SDSS	KON	2.5 km	MPC · JPL
422764	2001 UD_{9}	—	October 17, 2001	Socorro	LINEAR	·	970 m	MPC · JPL
422765	2001 UP_{22}	—	October 17, 2001	Socorro	LINEAR	·	1.4 km	MPC · JPL
422766	2001 UJ_{37}	—	October 17, 2001	Socorro	LINEAR	·	950 m	MPC · JPL
422767	2001 UO_{58}	—	October 17, 2001	Socorro	LINEAR	·	1.2 km	MPC · JPL
422768	2001 UB_{94}	—	October 19, 2001	Haleakala	NEAT	·	1.1 km	MPC · JPL
422769	2001 UZ_{112}	—	October 21, 2001	Socorro	LINEAR	·	1.8 km	MPC · JPL
422770	2001 UW_{115}	—	October 13, 2001	Kitt Peak	Spacewatch	·	3.0 km	MPC · JPL
422771	2001 UZ_{124}	—	October 22, 2001	Palomar	NEAT	·	1.8 km	MPC · JPL
422772	2001 UA_{183}	—	October 16, 2001	Socorro	LINEAR	·	1.3 km	MPC · JPL
422773	2001 UZ_{186}	—	October 17, 2001	Socorro	LINEAR	·	3.4 km	MPC · JPL
422774	2001 UB_{193}	—	October 18, 2001	Anderson Mesa	LONEOS	·	1.3 km	MPC · JPL
422775	2001 UK_{200}	—	October 19, 2001	Palomar	NEAT	·	840 m	MPC · JPL
422776	2001 UC_{205}	—	October 19, 2001	Palomar	NEAT	·	1.5 km	MPC · JPL
422777	2001 UU_{227}	—	October 19, 2001	Palomar	NEAT	·	870 m	MPC · JPL
422778	2001 VU_{23}	—	October 21, 2001	Socorro	LINEAR	·	840 m	MPC · JPL
422779	2001 VX_{55}	—	November 10, 2001	Socorro	LINEAR	·	1.6 km	MPC · JPL
422780	2001 VQ_{70}	—	November 11, 2001	Socorro	LINEAR	·	1.7 km	MPC · JPL
422781	2001 VU_{82}	—	November 10, 2001	Socorro	LINEAR	·	1.6 km	MPC · JPL
422782	2001 VL_{84}	—	November 12, 2001	Socorro	LINEAR	·	1.5 km	MPC · JPL
422783	2001 VP_{104}	—	November 12, 2001	Socorro	LINEAR	(5)	1.1 km	MPC · JPL
422784	2001 VG_{119}	—	November 12, 2001	Socorro	LINEAR	·	1.6 km	MPC · JPL
422785	2001 VW_{124}	—	November 10, 2001	Socorro	LINEAR	·	1.7 km	MPC · JPL
422786	2001 VH_{132}	—	November 12, 2001	Apache Point	SDSS	L5	10 km	MPC · JPL
422787	2001 WS_{1}	—	November 17, 2001	Socorro	LINEAR	APO +1km · PHA	1.4 km	MPC · JPL
422788	2001 WA_{17}	—	November 17, 2001	Socorro	LINEAR	EUN	1.1 km	MPC · JPL
422789	2001 WC_{17}	—	October 13, 2001	Kitt Peak	Spacewatch	·	1.3 km	MPC · JPL
422790	2001 WG_{26}	—	November 17, 2001	Socorro	LINEAR	·	1.5 km	MPC · JPL
422791	2001 WR_{42}	—	November 18, 2001	Socorro	LINEAR	·	810 m	MPC · JPL
422792	2001 WM_{43}	—	October 24, 2001	Socorro	LINEAR	EOS	2.4 km	MPC · JPL
422793	2001 WW_{59}	—	November 19, 2001	Socorro	LINEAR	·	950 m	MPC · JPL
422794	2001 XH_{7}	—	October 17, 2001	Socorro	LINEAR	JUN	970 m	MPC · JPL
422795	2001 XM_{8}	—	December 9, 2001	Socorro	LINEAR	·	1.5 km	MPC · JPL
422796	2001 XL_{54}	—	November 17, 2001	Socorro	LINEAR	·	1.8 km	MPC · JPL
422797	2001 XX_{75}	—	November 19, 2001	Anderson Mesa	LONEOS	·	970 m	MPC · JPL
422798	2001 XT_{125}	—	December 14, 2001	Socorro	LINEAR	EUN	1.3 km	MPC · JPL
422799	2001 XA_{127}	—	November 20, 2001	Socorro	LINEAR	·	2.1 km	MPC · JPL
422800	2001 XT_{191}	—	December 14, 2001	Socorro	LINEAR	·	2.7 km	MPC · JPL

== 422801–422900 ==
back to top

Designation			Discovery			Properties		Ref
Permanent	Provisional	Named after	Date	Site	Discoverer(s)	Category	Diam.	Ref
422801	2001 XH_{207}	—	December 11, 2001	Socorro	LINEAR	·	1.4 km	MPC · JPL
422802	2001 XM_{222}	—	December 15, 2001	Socorro	LINEAR	·	1.9 km	MPC · JPL
422803	2001 XF_{242}	—	December 14, 2001	Socorro	LINEAR	NEM	2.9 km	MPC · JPL
422804	2001 XF_{266}	—	December 9, 2001	Socorro	LINEAR	·	2.0 km	MPC · JPL
422805	2001 YY_{12}	—	December 17, 2001	Socorro	LINEAR	·	1.9 km	MPC · JPL
422806	2001 YV_{13}	—	December 17, 2001	Socorro	LINEAR	·	1.1 km	MPC · JPL
422807	2001 YF_{37}	—	December 18, 2001	Socorro	LINEAR	(5)	1.1 km	MPC · JPL
422808	2001 YP_{58}	—	December 18, 2001	Socorro	LINEAR	·	1.5 km	MPC · JPL
422809	2001 YF_{88}	—	December 18, 2001	Socorro	LINEAR	H	590 m	MPC · JPL
422810	2001 YZ_{115}	—	December 17, 2001	Socorro	LINEAR	·	1.4 km	MPC · JPL
422811	2001 YQ_{137}	—	December 9, 2001	Socorro	LINEAR	·	1.7 km	MPC · JPL
422812	2002 AB_{33}	—	January 6, 2002	Kitt Peak	Spacewatch	(883)	610 m	MPC · JPL
422813	2002 AT_{94}	—	January 8, 2002	Socorro	LINEAR	·	1.4 km	MPC · JPL
422814	2002 AA_{138}	—	December 14, 2001	Socorro	LINEAR	·	750 m	MPC · JPL
422815	2002 AD_{141}	—	January 13, 2002	Socorro	LINEAR	·	1.2 km	MPC · JPL
422816	2002 AS_{184}	—	January 7, 2002	Anderson Mesa	LONEOS	H	710 m	MPC · JPL
422817	2002 AY_{189}	—	January 11, 2002	Kitt Peak	Spacewatch	·	1.6 km	MPC · JPL
422818	2002 AG_{202}	—	January 12, 2002	Palomar	NEAT	·	2.0 km	MPC · JPL
422819	2002 BH_{20}	—	January 21, 2002	Socorro	LINEAR	H	610 m	MPC · JPL
422820	2002 CP	—	February 2, 2002	Cima Ekar	ADAS	CYB	3.7 km	MPC · JPL
422821	2002 CT_{9}	—	February 6, 2002	Socorro	LINEAR	H	610 m	MPC · JPL
422822	2002 CG_{21}	—	January 13, 2002	Socorro	LINEAR	(5)	1.2 km	MPC · JPL
422823	2002 CN_{30}	—	February 6, 2002	Socorro	LINEAR	JUN · slow	1.1 km	MPC · JPL
422824	2002 CH_{58}	—	February 9, 2002	Kitt Peak	Spacewatch	EUN	1.6 km	MPC · JPL
422825	2002 CR_{96}	—	February 7, 2002	Socorro	LINEAR	ADE	2.8 km	MPC · JPL
422826	2002 CA_{112}	—	February 7, 2002	Socorro	LINEAR	H	760 m	MPC · JPL
422827	2002 CE_{127}	—	February 7, 2002	Socorro	LINEAR	·	2.2 km	MPC · JPL
422828	2002 CL_{136}	—	February 8, 2002	Socorro	LINEAR	H	610 m	MPC · JPL
422829	2002 CT_{150}	—	February 10, 2002	Socorro	LINEAR	·	1.6 km	MPC · JPL
422830	2002 CH_{191}	—	February 10, 2002	Socorro	LINEAR	·	980 m	MPC · JPL
422831	2002 CZ_{237}	—	February 11, 2002	Socorro	LINEAR	·	2.1 km	MPC · JPL
422832	2002 CP_{263}	—	February 7, 2002	Palomar	NEAT	·	2.2 km	MPC · JPL
422833	2002 CB_{281}	—	February 8, 2002	Kitt Peak	M. W. Buie	·	1.7 km	MPC · JPL
422834	2002 CJ_{295}	—	February 10, 2002	Socorro	LINEAR	·	940 m	MPC · JPL
422835	2002 CY_{300}	—	February 11, 2002	Socorro	LINEAR	·	2.0 km	MPC · JPL
422836	2002 DL_{15}	—	February 16, 2002	Palomar	NEAT	·	2.2 km	MPC · JPL
422837	2002 DB_{21}	—	February 20, 2002	Kitt Peak	Spacewatch	·	1.6 km	MPC · JPL
422838	2002 EL_{2}	—	March 9, 2002	Palomar	NEAT	·	5.3 km	MPC · JPL
422839	2002 ET_{48}	—	March 12, 2002	Palomar	NEAT	·	1.8 km	MPC · JPL
422840	2002 EC_{56}	—	March 13, 2002	Socorro	LINEAR	·	2.1 km	MPC · JPL
422841	2002 EG_{86}	—	March 9, 2002	Socorro	LINEAR	·	1.6 km	MPC · JPL
422842	2002 EH_{125}	—	February 11, 2002	Socorro	LINEAR	H	550 m	MPC · JPL
422843	2002 EZ_{143}	—	March 13, 2002	Socorro	LINEAR	·	1.7 km	MPC · JPL
422844	2002 EZ_{145}	—	February 9, 2002	Kitt Peak	Spacewatch	·	2.1 km	MPC · JPL
422845	2002 GX_{23}	—	April 9, 2002	Socorro	LINEAR	·	770 m	MPC · JPL
422846	2002 GL_{72}	—	April 9, 2002	Anderson Mesa	LONEOS	ADE	2.5 km	MPC · JPL
422847	2002 GK_{111}	—	April 10, 2002	Socorro	LINEAR	·	550 m	MPC · JPL
422848	2002 GU_{143}	—	April 9, 2002	Socorro	LINEAR	·	700 m	MPC · JPL
422849	2002 GO_{182}	—	April 15, 2002	Palomar	NEAT	·	1.3 km	MPC · JPL
422850	2002 GQ_{184}	—	April 8, 2002	Kitt Peak	Spacewatch	·	1.4 km	MPC · JPL
422851	2002 GO_{186}	—	April 4, 2002	Palomar	NEAT	·	2.0 km	MPC · JPL
422852	2002 JC_{14}	—	May 7, 2002	Palomar	NEAT	PHO	840 m	MPC · JPL
422853	2002 JU_{44}	—	May 9, 2002	Socorro	LINEAR	PHO	1.1 km	MPC · JPL
422854	2002 JO_{121}	—	May 5, 2002	Palomar	NEAT	PHO	950 m	MPC · JPL
422855	2002 JO_{137}	—	May 9, 2002	Palomar	NEAT	·	670 m	MPC · JPL
422856	2002 LX_{10}	—	June 5, 2002	Socorro	LINEAR	·	760 m	MPC · JPL
422857	2002 LW_{30}	—	June 3, 2002	Socorro	LINEAR	·	840 m	MPC · JPL
422858	2002 NJ_{32}	—	July 13, 2002	Socorro	LINEAR	T_{j} (2.98)	3.2 km	MPC · JPL
422859	2002 NU_{68}	—	July 14, 2002	Palomar	NEAT	GEF	1.5 km	MPC · JPL
422860	2002 OT_{33}	—	July 21, 2002	Palomar	NEAT	·	880 m	MPC · JPL
422861	2002 PC_{30}	—	August 6, 2002	Palomar	NEAT	MAS	630 m	MPC · JPL
422862	2002 PE_{35}	—	August 6, 2002	Palomar	NEAT	·	1.6 km	MPC · JPL
422863	2002 PE_{77}	—	August 11, 2002	Palomar	NEAT	EOS	2.0 km	MPC · JPL
422864	2002 PZ_{89}	—	August 11, 2002	Socorro	LINEAR	·	2.1 km	MPC · JPL
422865	2002 PY_{105}	—	August 12, 2002	Socorro	LINEAR	V · fast	600 m	MPC · JPL
422866	2002 PG_{130}	—	August 14, 2002	Socorro	LINEAR	PHO	1.2 km	MPC · JPL
422867	2002 PX_{139}	—	August 13, 2002	Socorro	LINEAR	·	2.4 km	MPC · JPL
422868	2002 PC_{160}	—	August 8, 2002	Palomar	S. F. Hönig	·	700 m	MPC · JPL
422869	2002 PW_{161}	—	August 8, 2002	Palomar	S. F. Hönig	NYS	1.3 km	MPC · JPL
422870	2002 PQ_{168}	—	August 8, 2002	Palomar	NEAT	NYS	840 m	MPC · JPL
422871	2002 PY_{169}	—	August 7, 2002	Palomar	NEAT	·	1.5 km	MPC · JPL
422872	2002 PF_{181}	—	August 15, 2002	Palomar	NEAT	·	1.4 km	MPC · JPL
422873	2002 PU_{186}	—	August 11, 2002	Palomar	NEAT	·	1 km	MPC · JPL
422874	2002 QL_{13}	—	August 26, 2002	Palomar	NEAT	·	2.1 km	MPC · JPL
422875	2002 QU_{17}	—	August 14, 2002	Kitt Peak	Spacewatch	·	1.8 km	MPC · JPL
422876	2002 QJ_{20}	—	August 16, 2002	Socorro	LINEAR	·	2.3 km	MPC · JPL
422877	2002 QL_{24}	—	August 29, 2002	Palomar	NEAT	·	1.6 km	MPC · JPL
422878	2002 QP_{30}	—	August 29, 2002	Palomar	NEAT	MAS	670 m	MPC · JPL
422879	2002 QN_{31}	—	August 29, 2002	Palomar	NEAT	NYS	1.0 km	MPC · JPL
422880	2002 QH_{39}	—	August 30, 2002	Kitt Peak	Spacewatch	MAS	660 m	MPC · JPL
422881	2002 QX_{52}	—	August 29, 2002	Palomar	S. F. Hönig	NYS	1.1 km	MPC · JPL
422882	2002 QF_{54}	—	August 17, 2002	Palomar	Lowe, A.	NYS	1.1 km	MPC · JPL
422883	2002 QA_{62}	—	August 17, 2002	Palomar	NEAT	H	590 m	MPC · JPL
422884	2002 QJ_{71}	—	August 17, 2002	Palomar	NEAT	·	1.9 km	MPC · JPL
422885	2002 QW_{76}	—	August 19, 2002	Palomar	NEAT	·	1.2 km	MPC · JPL
422886	2002 QR_{83}	—	August 18, 2002	Palomar	NEAT	·	1.1 km	MPC · JPL
422887	2002 QS_{86}	—	August 17, 2002	Palomar	NEAT	·	1.7 km	MPC · JPL
422888	2002 QA_{98}	—	August 18, 2002	Palomar	NEAT	NYS	900 m	MPC · JPL
422889	2002 QT_{101}	—	August 12, 2002	Anderson Mesa	LONEOS	·	3.3 km	MPC · JPL
422890	2002 QD_{111}	—	August 17, 2002	Palomar	NEAT	·	1.8 km	MPC · JPL
422891	2002 QO_{120}	—	August 30, 2002	Palomar	NEAT	EOS	1.9 km	MPC · JPL
422892	2002 QO_{145}	—	January 29, 2000	Kitt Peak	Spacewatch	·	2.6 km	MPC · JPL
422893	2002 RH_{10}	—	September 4, 2002	Palomar	NEAT	GEF	1.6 km	MPC · JPL
422894	2002 RW_{35}	—	August 12, 2002	Socorro	LINEAR	·	3.3 km	MPC · JPL
422895	2002 RK_{36}	—	September 5, 2002	Anderson Mesa	LONEOS	·	3.1 km	MPC · JPL
422896	2002 RJ_{50}	—	September 5, 2002	Socorro	LINEAR	·	3.6 km	MPC · JPL
422897	2002 RZ_{70}	—	September 4, 2002	Palomar	NEAT	·	1.4 km	MPC · JPL
422898	2002 RX_{113}	—	September 5, 2002	Socorro	LINEAR	·	1.3 km	MPC · JPL
422899	2002 RD_{119}	—	September 5, 2002	Haleakala	NEAT	PHO	920 m	MPC · JPL
422900	2002 RY_{141}	—	September 11, 2002	Palomar	NEAT	·	2.3 km	MPC · JPL

== 422901–423000 ==
back to top

Designation			Discovery			Properties		Ref
Permanent	Provisional	Named after	Date	Site	Discoverer(s)	Category	Diam.	Ref
422901	2002 RY_{145}	—	September 11, 2002	Palomar	NEAT	·	1.1 km	MPC · JPL
422902	2002 RH_{155}	—	September 11, 2002	Palomar	NEAT	·	2.6 km	MPC · JPL
422903	2002 RF_{157}	—	September 11, 2002	Palomar	NEAT	·	2.1 km	MPC · JPL
422904	2002 RW_{163}	—	September 12, 2002	Palomar	NEAT	·	1.2 km	MPC · JPL
422905	2002 RN_{185}	—	September 12, 2002	Palomar	NEAT	·	2.8 km	MPC · JPL
422906	2002 RH_{189}	—	September 13, 2002	Socorro	LINEAR	·	3.4 km	MPC · JPL
422907	2002 RZ_{191}	—	September 12, 2002	Palomar	NEAT	THM	2.2 km	MPC · JPL
422908	2002 RQ_{204}	—	September 14, 2002	Palomar	NEAT	·	1.2 km	MPC · JPL
422909	2002 RV_{213}	—	September 13, 2002	Anderson Mesa	LONEOS	·	1.2 km	MPC · JPL
422910	2002 RR_{239}	—	September 14, 2002	Palomar	R. Matson	·	1.1 km	MPC · JPL
422911	2002 RC_{244}	—	September 13, 2002	Palomar	NEAT	·	2.1 km	MPC · JPL
422912	2002 RE_{248}	—	September 12, 2002	Palomar	NEAT	·	2.9 km	MPC · JPL
422913	2002 RE_{260}	—	September 15, 2002	Palomar	NEAT	·	1.1 km	MPC · JPL
422914	2002 RJ_{273}	—	September 4, 2002	Palomar	NEAT	·	1.8 km	MPC · JPL
422915	2002 RO_{274}	—	September 4, 2002	Palomar	NEAT	·	960 m	MPC · JPL
422916	2002 RT_{275}	—	September 14, 2002	Palomar	NEAT	·	890 m	MPC · JPL
422917	2002 ST_{5}	—	September 27, 2002	Palomar	NEAT	·	2.6 km	MPC · JPL
422918	2002 SC_{16}	—	September 27, 2002	Palomar	NEAT	·	3.8 km	MPC · JPL
422919	2002 SD_{22}	—	September 26, 2002	Palomar	NEAT	NYS	1.2 km	MPC · JPL
422920	2002 SF_{65}	—	September 17, 2002	Palomar	NEAT	·	880 m	MPC · JPL
422921	2002 TA_{107}	—	October 3, 2002	Socorro	LINEAR	·	1.8 km	MPC · JPL
422922	2002 TS_{123}	—	October 4, 2002	Palomar	NEAT	·	2.6 km	MPC · JPL
422923	2002 TZ_{128}	—	October 4, 2002	Palomar	NEAT	·	1.9 km	MPC · JPL
422924	2002 TU_{144}	—	October 2, 2002	Socorro	LINEAR	MAS	800 m	MPC · JPL
422925	2002 TM_{165}	—	October 2, 2002	Haleakala	NEAT	·	1.5 km	MPC · JPL
422926	2002 TP_{173}	—	October 4, 2002	Socorro	LINEAR	·	2.3 km	MPC · JPL
422927	2002 TF_{191}	—	October 3, 2002	Palomar	NEAT	·	2.5 km	MPC · JPL
422928	2002 TA_{229}	—	October 7, 2002	Haleakala	NEAT	·	1.4 km	MPC · JPL
422929	2002 TA_{230}	—	October 9, 2002	Kitt Peak	Spacewatch	THM	2.3 km	MPC · JPL
422930	2002 TQ_{243}	—	October 9, 2002	Kitt Peak	Spacewatch	·	2.1 km	MPC · JPL
422931	2002 TP_{244}	—	October 4, 2002	Campo Imperatore	CINEOS	·	2.4 km	MPC · JPL
422932	2002 TU_{267}	—	October 4, 2002	Socorro	LINEAR	·	3.0 km	MPC · JPL
422933	2002 TB_{273}	—	October 4, 2002	Socorro	LINEAR	·	2.2 km	MPC · JPL
422934	2002 TQ_{306}	—	October 4, 2002	Apache Point	SDSS	·	2.4 km	MPC · JPL
422935	2002 TS_{309}	—	October 4, 2002	Apache Point	SDSS	·	2.7 km	MPC · JPL
422936	2002 TW_{310}	—	October 4, 2002	Apache Point	SDSS	·	2.2 km	MPC · JPL
422937	2002 TG_{311}	—	October 4, 2002	Apache Point	SDSS	·	3.1 km	MPC · JPL
422938	2002 TB_{312}	—	October 4, 2002	Apache Point	SDSS	LIX	3.5 km	MPC · JPL
422939	2002 TL_{315}	—	January 22, 1998	Kitt Peak	Spacewatch	·	4.1 km	MPC · JPL
422940	2002 TJ_{346}	—	October 5, 2002	Apache Point	SDSS	EOS	1.7 km	MPC · JPL
422941	2002 TL_{347}	—	October 5, 2002	Apache Point	SDSS	·	1.2 km	MPC · JPL
422942	2002 TM_{359}	—	October 10, 2002	Apache Point	SDSS	NYS	900 m	MPC · JPL
422943	2002 TO_{363}	—	October 10, 2002	Apache Point	SDSS	·	1.6 km	MPC · JPL
422944	2002 TA_{371}	—	October 10, 2002	Apache Point	SDSS	EOS	2.3 km	MPC · JPL
422945	2002 TO_{371}	—	October 10, 2002	Apache Point	SDSS	·	2.6 km	MPC · JPL
422946	2002 TQ_{378}	—	October 5, 2002	Palomar	NEAT	PHO	1.0 km	MPC · JPL
422947	2002 UC_{58}	—	October 29, 2002	Apache Point	SDSS	·	2.6 km	MPC · JPL
422948	2002 UA_{61}	—	October 29, 2002	Apache Point	SDSS	·	2.4 km	MPC · JPL
422949	2002 UL_{77}	—	October 31, 2002	Palomar	NEAT	·	3.3 km	MPC · JPL
422950	2002 VS_{15}	—	October 13, 2002	Kitt Peak	Spacewatch	·	3.1 km	MPC · JPL
422951	2002 VA_{58}	—	November 6, 2002	Haleakala	NEAT	NYS	1.3 km	MPC · JPL
422952	2002 VO_{121}	—	November 13, 2002	Socorro	LINEAR	NYS	1.1 km	MPC · JPL
422953	2002 VY_{137}	—	November 1, 2002	Palomar	NEAT	·	1.3 km	MPC · JPL
422954	2002 WA_{3}	—	November 24, 2002	Palomar	NEAT	·	2.7 km	MPC · JPL
422955	2002 WZ_{4}	—	November 24, 2002	Palomar	NEAT	·	1.6 km	MPC · JPL
422956	2002 WT_{7}	—	November 24, 2002	Palomar	NEAT	·	1.3 km	MPC · JPL
422957	2002 WZ_{20}	—	November 24, 2002	Palomar	NEAT	·	730 m	MPC · JPL
422958	2002 WW_{25}	—	November 16, 2002	Palomar	NEAT	·	1.5 km	MPC · JPL
422959	2003 AY_{49}	—	January 5, 2003	Socorro	LINEAR	·	1.9 km	MPC · JPL
422960	2003 BP_{9}	—	January 26, 2003	Palomar	NEAT	·	5.1 km	MPC · JPL
422961	2003 BN_{38}	—	January 27, 2003	Anderson Mesa	LONEOS	·	1.7 km	MPC · JPL
422962	2003 BB_{77}	—	January 29, 2003	Kvistaberg	Uppsala-DLR Asteroid Survey	·	2.5 km	MPC · JPL
422963	2003 CW_{5}	—	February 1, 2003	Socorro	LINEAR	·	1.5 km	MPC · JPL
422964	2003 CJ_{14}	—	February 3, 2003	Socorro	LINEAR	·	1.3 km	MPC · JPL
422965	2003 EK_{56}	—	March 9, 2003	Socorro	LINEAR	·	1.3 km	MPC · JPL
422966	2003 EL_{57}	—	March 9, 2003	Anderson Mesa	LONEOS	·	1.4 km	MPC · JPL
422967	2003 FN_{49}	—	March 24, 2003	Haleakala	NEAT	·	1.4 km	MPC · JPL
422968	2003 FN_{110}	—	March 24, 2003	Kitt Peak	Spacewatch	·	1.4 km	MPC · JPL
422969	2003 FF_{132}	—	March 24, 2003	Kitt Peak	Spacewatch	·	920 m	MPC · JPL
422970	2003 GM_{18}	—	April 4, 2003	Kitt Peak	Spacewatch	·	1.1 km	MPC · JPL
422971	2003 GH_{39}	—	April 9, 2003	Kitt Peak	Spacewatch	·	1.4 km	MPC · JPL
422972	2003 GY_{47}	—	April 8, 2003	Socorro	LINEAR	·	1.2 km	MPC · JPL
422973	2003 GQ_{56}	—	April 11, 2003	Kitt Peak	Spacewatch	·	2.8 km	MPC · JPL
422974	2003 HT_{49}	—	April 29, 2003	Anderson Mesa	LONEOS	·	1.9 km	MPC · JPL
422975	2003 HF_{58}	—	April 29, 2003	Kitt Peak	Spacewatch	·	1.0 km	MPC · JPL
422976	2003 KQ_{6}	—	May 25, 2003	Kitt Peak	Spacewatch	KON	2.8 km	MPC · JPL
422977	2003 MV_{7}	—	June 29, 2003	Socorro	LINEAR	AMO	340 m	MPC · JPL
422978	2003 OR_{23}	—	July 22, 2003	Campo Imperatore	CINEOS	·	730 m	MPC · JPL
422979	2003 PX_{10}	—	August 4, 2003	Lake Tekapo	A. C. Gilmore, P. M. Kilmartin	(32418)	2.5 km	MPC · JPL
422980	2003 QB_{29}	—	August 23, 2003	Palomar	NEAT	H	540 m	MPC · JPL
422981	2003 QN_{81}	—	August 23, 2003	Cerro Tololo	M. W. Buie	·	3.4 km	MPC · JPL
422982	2003 QE_{102}	—	August 31, 2003	Kitt Peak	Spacewatch	·	690 m	MPC · JPL
422983	2003 RC_{1}	—	September 2, 2003	Socorro	LINEAR	·	3.0 km	MPC · JPL
422984	2003 RU_{16}	—	September 15, 2003	Palomar	NEAT	JUN	1.2 km	MPC · JPL
422985	2003 RG_{25}	—	September 15, 2003	Palomar	NEAT	·	2.3 km	MPC · JPL
422986	2003 SV_{3}	—	September 16, 2003	Kitt Peak	Spacewatch	·	630 m	MPC · JPL
422987	2003 SJ_{29}	—	September 18, 2003	Socorro	LINEAR	·	750 m	MPC · JPL
422988	2003 SE_{41}	—	September 17, 2003	Palomar	NEAT	·	950 m	MPC · JPL
422989	2003 SK_{50}	—	September 18, 2003	Palomar	NEAT	RAF	980 m	MPC · JPL
422990	2003 SS_{86}	—	September 17, 2003	Anderson Mesa	LONEOS	·	1.4 km	MPC · JPL
422991	2003 SO_{92}	—	September 18, 2003	Kitt Peak	Spacewatch	·	590 m	MPC · JPL
422992	2003 SF_{105}	—	September 20, 2003	Kitt Peak	Spacewatch	TEL	1.2 km	MPC · JPL
422993	2003 SN_{105}	—	September 20, 2003	Kitt Peak	Spacewatch	·	630 m	MPC · JPL
422994	2003 SB_{122}	—	September 17, 2003	Campo Imperatore	CINEOS	·	810 m	MPC · JPL
422995	2003 SQ_{137}	—	September 21, 2003	Campo Imperatore	CINEOS	·	670 m	MPC · JPL
422996	2003 SS_{177}	—	September 18, 2003	Campo Imperatore	CINEOS	·	1.1 km	MPC · JPL
422997	2003 SH_{188}	—	September 22, 2003	Anderson Mesa	LONEOS	·	820 m	MPC · JPL
422998	2003 SG_{211}	—	September 18, 2003	Anderson Mesa	LONEOS	·	2.7 km	MPC · JPL
422999	2003 SB_{243}	—	September 28, 2003	Socorro	LINEAR	·	760 m	MPC · JPL
423000	2003 SC_{243}	—	September 28, 2003	Kitt Peak	Spacewatch	·	480 m	MPC · JPL

back to top
