= 2537 Gilmore =

Main-belt asteroid

Discovery
- Discovered by: K. Reinmuth
- Discovery site: Heidelberg Obs.
- Discovery date: 4 September 1951

Designations
- Named after: Alan C. Gilmore; Pamela M. Kilmartin (New Zealand astronomers)
- Alternative designations: 1951 RL · 1977 QP_{2}
- Minor planet category: main-belt · Eunomia

Orbital characteristics
- Epoch 4 September 2017 (JD 2458000.5)
- Uncertainty parameter 0
- Observation arc: 65.47 yr (23,912 days)
- Aphelion: 3.1130 AU
- Perihelion: 2.1988 AU
- Semi-major axis: 2.6559 AU
- Eccentricity: 0.1721
- Orbital period (sidereal): 4.33 yr (1,581 days)
- Mean anomaly: 81.217°
- Mean motion: 0° 13^{m} 39.72^{s} / day
- Inclination: 12.937°
- Longitude of ascending node: 334.99°
- Argument of perihelion: 18.786°

Physical characteristics
- Dimensions: 6.68 km (calculated); 7.221±0.118 km
- Synodic rotation period: 4.230±0.020 h 4.2302±0.0399 h
- Geometric albedo: 0.21 (assumed); 0.309±0.055
- Spectral type: S
- Absolute magnitude (H): 12.6 · 12.650±0.120 (R) · 12.7 · 12.737±0.002 (R) · 13.19

2537 Gilmore, provisional designation 1951 RL, is a Eunomia asteroid from the middle region of the asteroid belt, approximately 7 kilometers in diameter. It was discovered on 4 September 1951, by German astronomer Karl Reinmuth at Heidelberg Observatory in southern Germany. It was named after New Zealand astronomer couple Alan C. Gilmore and Pamela M. Kilmartin.

== Orbit and classification ==
Gilmore is a member of the Eunomia family, a large group of S-type asteroids and the most prominent family in the intermediate main-belt. It orbits the Sun in the central main-belt at a distance of 2.2–3.1 AU once every 4 years and 4 months (1,581 days). Its orbit has an eccentricity of 0.17 and an inclination of 13° with respect to the ecliptic. As no precoveries were taken, the body's observation arc begins with its official discovery observation at Heidelberg in 1951.

== Physical characteristics ==
=== Diameter and albedo ===
According to the survey carried out by the NEOWISE mission of NASA's Wide-field Infrared Survey Explorer, Gilmore measures 7.2 kilometers in diameter and its surface has an albedo of 0.309, while the Collaborative Asteroid Lightcurve Link assumes an albedo of 0.21 and calculates a diameter of 6.7 kilometers with an absolute magnitude of 13.19.

=== Rotation period ===
From January to February 2014, two rotational lightcurves of Gilmore were obtained from photometric observations at the Palomar Transient Factory, California. The lightcurves gave a rotation period of 4.230 and 4.2302 hours with a brightness variation of 0.34 and 0.35 in magnitude, respectively (U=2/2).

== Naming ==
This minor planet was named in honor of New Zealand astronomer couple Alan C. Gilmore and his wife, Pamela (née Kilmartin), two very productive observers of comets and minor planet in the Southern Hemisphere. They research at the Mount John University Observatory since 1980, and are members of the Royal Astronomical Society of New Zealand.

The official naming citation was published by the Minor Planet Center on 24 July 1983 (M.P.C. 8064), based on a proposal by Conrad Bardwell (see 1615 Bardwell) and Brian G. Marsden. Pamela Gilmore is also honored by the minor planet 3907 Kilmartin.
