= Pamela M. Kilmartin =

New Zealand astronomer

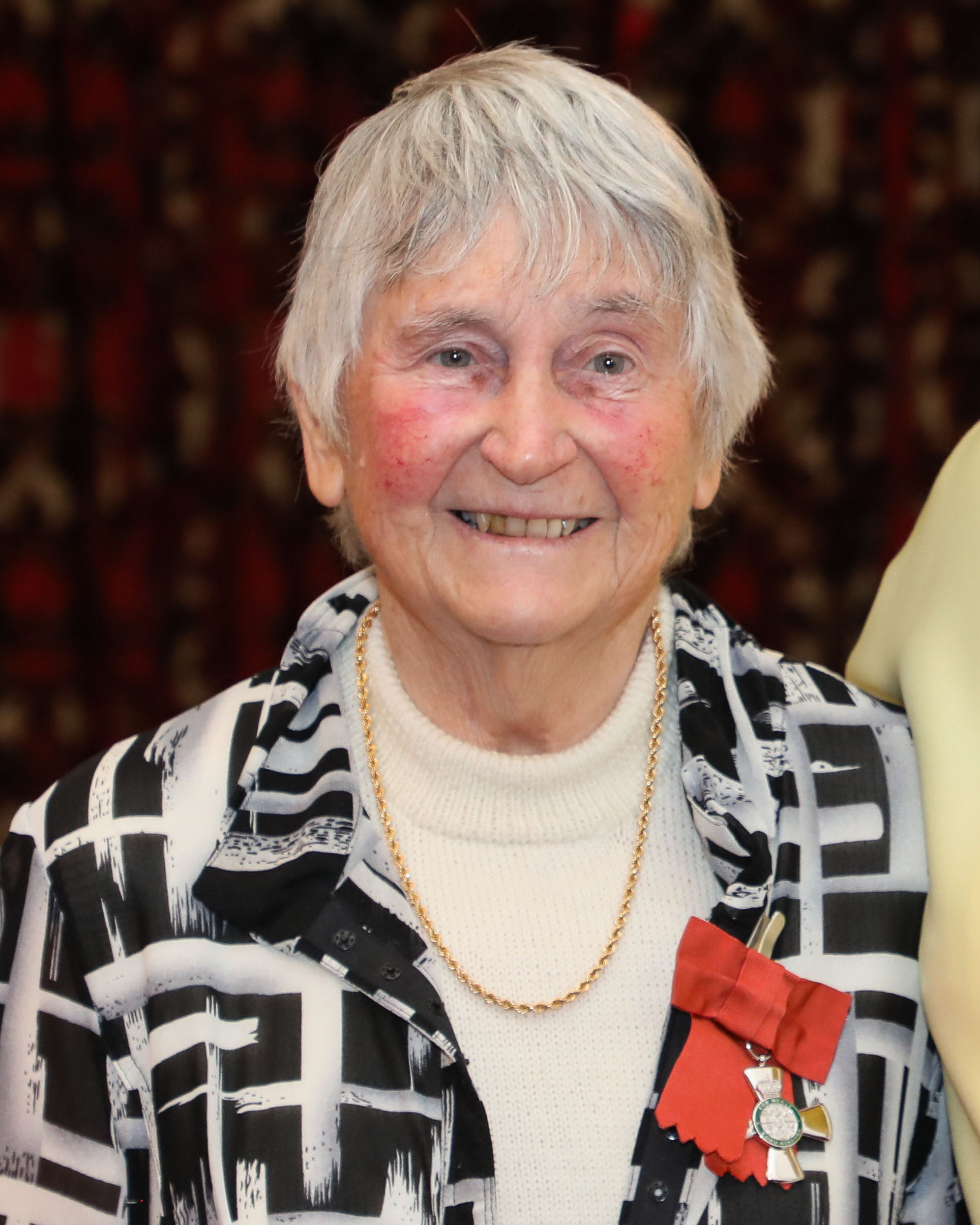
Kilmartin in 2025

Minor planets discovered: 41
see § List of discovered minor planets

Pamela Margaret Kilmartin MNZM is a New Zealand astronomer and a co-discoverer of minor planets and comets.

== Career ==
Kilmartin is credited by the Minor Planet Center with the discovery of 41 asteroids, all in collaboration with her husband, the astronomer Alan C. Gilmore. Both astronomers are also active comet-hunters. She is a Fellow of the Royal Astronomical Society of New Zealand (RASNZ) and co-director of its "Comets and Minor Planets" section. Kilmartin is one of eleven voting members of the International Astronomical Union's working group on Small Bodies Nomenclature, which is responsible for naming asteroids.

The minor planet 3907 Kilmartin, discovered by Max Wolf in 1904, was named in her honour. Naming citation was published on 21 April 1989 (M.P.C. 14482). In 1983, the Eunomia asteroid 2537 Gilmore was already named after both, Alan and Pamela Gilmore.

In May 2019, Kilmartin and her husband were honoured by New Zealand Post with a stamp in its New Zealand Space Pioneers series.

In the 2025 King’s Birthday Honours, Kilmartin was appointed a Member of the New Zealand Order of Merit, for services to astronomy.

== List of discovered minor planets ==
2434 Bateson ^{[A]}	27 May 1981
3087 Beatrice Tinsley ^{[A]}	30 August 1981
3152 Jones ^{[A]}	7 June 1983
3305 Ceadams ^{[A]}	21 May 1985
3400 Aotearoa ^{[A]}	2 April 1981
3521 Comrie ^{[A]}	26 June 1982
3563 Canterbury ^{[A]}	23 March 1985
3810 Aoraki ^{[A]}	20 February 1985
4154 Rumsey ^{[A]}	10 July 1985
4243 Nankivell ^{[A]}	4 April 1981
4248 Ranald ^{[A]}	23 April 1984
4409 Kissling ^{[A]}	30 June 1989
4819 Gifford ^{[A]}	24 May 1985
4837 Bickerton ^{[A]}	30 June 1989
5207 Hearnshaw ^{[A]}	15 April 1988

5251 Bradwood ^{[A]}	18 May 1985
5311 Rutherford ^{[A]}	3 April 1981
5718 Roykerr ^{[A]}	4 August 1983
5763 Williamtobin ^{[A]}	23 June 1982
(5818) 1989 RC_{1} ^{[A]}	5 September 1989
(5898) 1985 KE ^{[A]}	23 May 1985
(5906) 1989 SN_{5} ^{[A]}	24 September 1989
(6034) 1987 JA ^{[A]}	5 May 1987
6142 Tantawi ^{[A]}	23 March 1993
(7432) 1993 HL_{5} ^{[A]}	23 April 1993
(8481) 1988 LH ^{[A]}	14 June 1988
(8884) 1994 CM_{2} ^{[A]}	12 February 1994
9018 Galache ^{[A]}	5 May 1987
(9750) 1989 NE_{1} ^{[A]}	8 July 1989
(11080) 1993 FO ^{[A]}	23 March 1993

(13510) 1989 OL ^{[A]}	29 July 1989
13511) 1989 RD_{1} ^{[A]}	5 September 1989
(13552) 1992 GA ^{[A]}	4 April 1992
(15712) 1989 RN_{2} ^{[A]}	1 September 1989
(18340) 1989 OM ^{[A]}	29 July 1989
(21130) 1993 FN ^{[A]}	23 March 1993
(30945) 1994 GW_{9} ^{[A]}	14 April 1994
(48501) 1993 FM ^{[A]}	23 March 1993
(58158) 1989 RA ^{[A]}	1 September 1989
(65718) 1993 FL ^{[A]}	23 March 1993
(422979) 2003 PX_{10} ^{[A]}	4 August 2003
^{A} co-discovered with Alan C. Gilmore
