= 3563 Canterbury =

Main-belt asteroid

Discovery
- Discovered by: A. Gilmore; P. Kilmartin
- Discovery site: Mount John University Obs.
- Discovery date: 23 March 1985

Designations
- Named after: Canterbury Province (province of New Zealand )
- Alternative designations: 1985 FE · 1978 VL_{6}
- Minor planet category: main-belt · (middle); Dora

Orbital characteristics
- Epoch 4 September 2017 (JD 2458000.5)
- Uncertainty parameter 0
- Observation arc: 38.40 yr (14,024 days)
- Aphelion: 3.2954 AU
- Perihelion: 2.2853 AU
- Semi-major axis: 2.7904 AU
- Eccentricity: 0.1810
- Orbital period (sidereal): 4.66 yr (1,703 days)
- Mean anomaly: 283.52°
- Mean motion: 0° 12^{m} 41.4^{s} / day
- Inclination: 6.9555°
- Longitude of ascending node: 267.78°
- Argument of perihelion: 346.06°

Physical characteristics
- Dimensions: 13.72 km (calculated); 15.26±3.43 km 16.924±0.125 km 21.08±8.45 km
- Synodic rotation period: 15.553±0.0118 h
- Geometric albedo: 0.040±0.055; 0.050±0.013; 0.057 (assumed); 0.06±0.04
- Spectral type: SMASS = Ch · C
- Absolute magnitude (H): 12.4 · 12.50 · 12.591±0.002 (R) · 12.60 · 12.7 · 12.79±0.36; 13.04

3563 Canterbury, provisional designation 1985 FE, is a dark Dorian asteroid from the middle regions of the asteroid belt, approximately 16 kilometers in diameter. It was discovered on 23 March 1985, by astronomer couple Alan Gilmore and Pamela Kilmartin at Mount John University Observatory near Lake Tekapo, New Zealand. The asteroid was named after New Zealand's Canterbury Province.

== Classification and orbit ==
=== Dora family ===
Canterbury is a member of the Dora family, a large asteroid family of more than 1,200 carbonaceous asteroids, named after 668 Dora. It is also known as the "Zhongolovich family", named after its presumably largest member 1734 Zhongolovich. The Dora family may also contain a subfamily.

=== Orbit and observation arc ===
Canterbury orbits the Sun in the central main-belt at a distance of 2.3–3.3 AU once every 4 years and 8 months (1,703 days). Its orbit has an eccentricity of 0.18 and an inclination of 7° with respect to the ecliptic. The asteroid was first identified as 1978 VL_{6} at Palomar Observatory, extending the body's observation arc by 7 years prior to its official discovery observation.

== Physical characteristics ==
Canterbury has been characterized as a dark C-type asteroid by Pan-STARRS photometric survey. It is also classified as a hydrated Ch-subtype in the SMASS taxonomy.

=== Rotation period ===
In October 2010, a rotational lightcurve of Canterbury was obtained from photometric observations by astronomers at the Palomar Transient Factory in California. Lightcurve analysis gave a rotation period of 15.553 hours with a brightness variation of 0.61 magnitude (U=2).

=== Diameter and albedo ===
According to the survey carried out by the NEOWISE mission of NASA's Wide-field Infrared Survey Explorer, Canterbury measures between 15.26 and 21.08 kilometers in diameter and its surface has an albedo between 0.040 and 0.060. The Collaborative Asteroid Lightcurve Link assumes a standard albedo for carbonaceous asteroids of 0.057 and calculates a diameter of 13.72 kilometers based on an absolute magnitude of 13.04.

== Naming ==
This minor planet was named after New Zealand's Canterbury Province, on the eastern side of the South Island. It is also named for the University of Canterbury in Christchurch, New Zealand. The approved naming citation was published by the Minor Planet Center on 28 May 1991 (M.P.C. 18306).
