= Alan C. Gilmore =

New Zealand astronomer

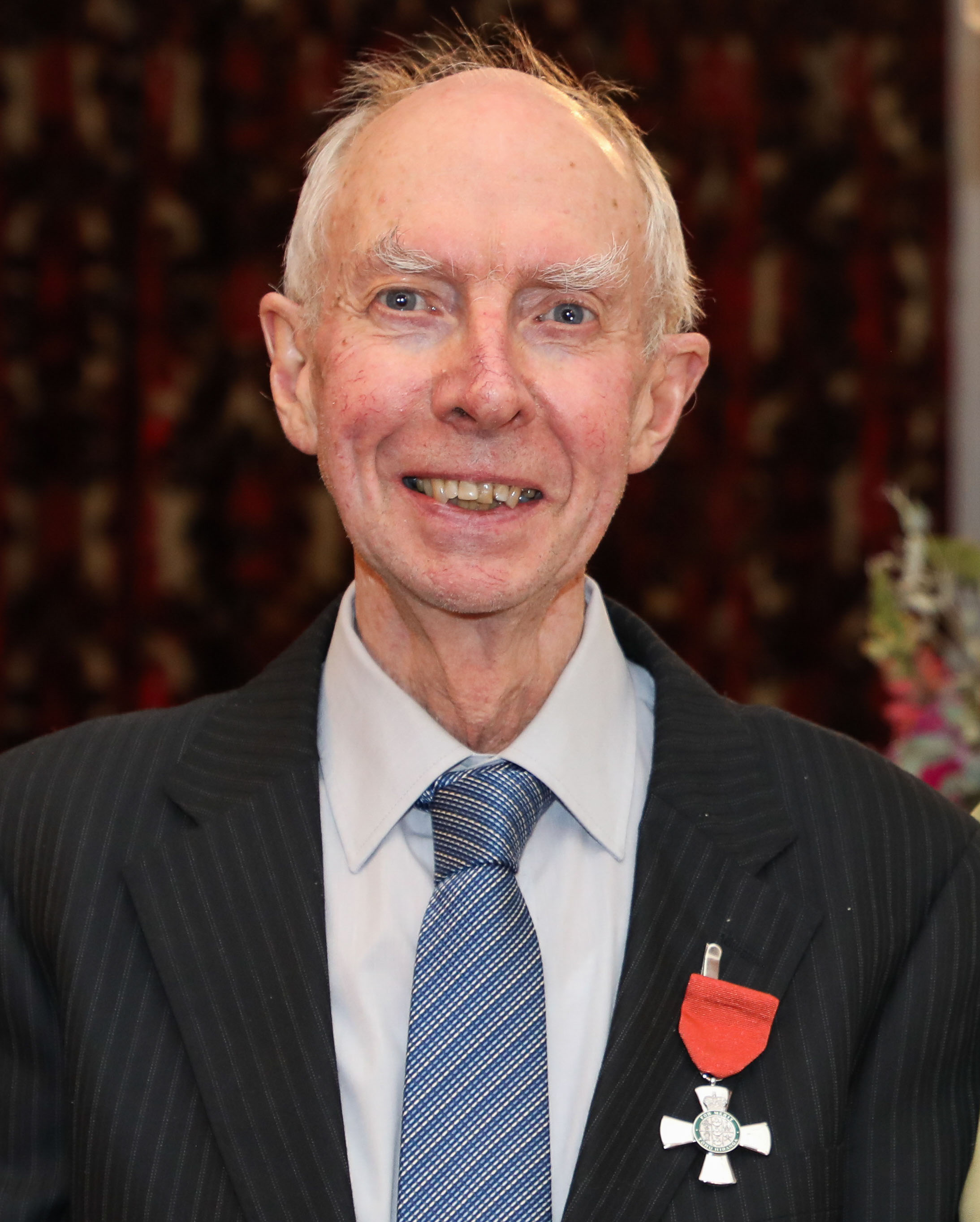
Gilmore in 2025

Asteroids discovered: 42
see § List of discovered minor planets

Alan Charles Gilmore MNZM (born 1944 in Greymouth, New Zealand) is a New Zealand astronomer and a discoverer of minor planets and other astronomical objects.

== Career ==
Gilmore is credited by the Minor Planet Center with the discovery of 41 minor planets, all but one in collaboration with his wife Pamela M. Kilmartin. Both astronomers are also active nova- and comet-hunters.

Until their retirement in 2014, Gilmore and Kilmartin worked at Mount John University Observatory (Department of Physics and Astronomy, University of Canterbury), where they continue to receive observing time. He is also a member of the Organizing Committee of IAU Commission 6, which oversees the dissemination of information and the assignment of credit for astronomical discoveries. The Commission still bears the name "Astronomical Telegrams", even though telegrams are no longer used.

On 20 August 2007, Gilmore discovered his first periodic comet, P/2007 Q2.

The Eunomia asteroid 2537 Gilmore was named in his honour, while his wife is honuored with the outer main-belt asteroid 3907 Kilmartin.

Gilmore talks on astronomy on the Radio New Zealand programme Nights' Science. In May 2019, he and his wife were honoured by New Zealand Post with a stamp in its New Zealand Space Pioneers series.

In the 2025 King’s Birthday Honours, Gilmore was appointed a Member of the New Zealand Order of Merit, for services to astronomy.

== List of discovered minor planets ==
2434 Bateson	27 May 981
3087 Beatrice Tinsley	30 August 1981
3152 Jones	7 June 1983
3305 Ceadams	21 May 1985
3400 Aotearoa	2 April 1981
3521 Comrie	26 June 1982
3563 Canterbury	23 March 1985
3810 Aoraki	20 February1985
4154 Rumsey	10 July 1985
4243 Nankivell	4 April 1981
4248 Ranald	23 April 1984
4409 Kissling	30 June 1989
4819 Gifford	24 May 1985
4837 Bickerton	30 June 1989
5207 Hearnshaw	15 April 1988

5251 Bradwood	18 May 1985
5311 Rutherford	3 April 1981
5718 Roykerr	4 August 1983
5763 Williamtobin	23 June 1982
(5818) 1989 RC1	5 September 1989
(5898) 1985 KE	23 May 1985
(5906) 1989 SN5	24 September 1989
(6034) 1987 JA	5 May 1987
(6142) 1993 FP	23 March 1993
(7432) 1993 HL_{5}	23 April 1993
(8481) 1988 LH	14 June 1988
(8884) 1994 CM_{2}	12 February 1994
(9018) 1987 JG	5 May 1987
(9750) 1989 NE_{1}	8 July 1989
(11080) 1993 FO	23 March 1993

(13510) 1989 OL	29 July 1989
(13511) 1989 RD_{1}	5 September 1989
(13552) 1992 GA	4 April 1992
(15712) 1989 RN_{2}	1 September 1989
(18340) 1989 OM	29 July 1989
(21130) 1993 FN	23 March 1993
(30945) 1994 GW_{9}	14 April 1994
(48501) 1993 FM	23 March 1993
(58158) 1989 RA	1 September 1989
(65718) 1993 FL	23 March 1993
(214416) 2005 PK ^{[Z]}	2 August 2005
(422979) 2003 PX_{10}	4 August 2003
^{z} not co-discovered with P. M. Kilmartin

== See also ==
- Gary Hug
- Miguel Itzigsohn
