= List of minor planets: 15001–16000 =

The following is a partial list of minor planets, running from minor-planet number 15001 through 16000, inclusive. The primary data for this and other partial lists is based on JPL's "Small-Body Orbital Elements" and data available from the Minor Planet Center. Critical list information is also provided by the MPC, unless otherwise specified from Lowell Observatory. A detailed description of the table's columns and additional sources are given on the main page including a complete list of every page in this series, and a statistical break-up on the dynamical classification of minor planets.

Also see the summary list of all named bodies in numerical and alphabetical order, and the corresponding naming citations for the number range of this particular list. New namings may only be added to this list after official publication, as the preannouncement of names is condemned by the Working Group for Small Bodies Nomenclature of the International Astronomical Union.

Near-Earth obj.	MBA (inner)	MBA (outer)	Centaur
Mars-crosser	MBA (middle)	Jupiter trojan	Trans-Neptunian obj.
Unclassified

== 15001–15100 ==
Designation			Discovery			Properties		Ref
Permanent	Provisional	Named after	Date	Site	Discoverer(s)	Category	Diam.	Ref
15001 Fuzhou	1997 WD_{30}	Fuzhou	November 21, 1997	Xinglong	SCAP	EOS · slow	7.6 km	MPC; JPL
15002 Shahriarbayegan	1997 WN_{38}	Shahriarbayegan	November 29, 1997	Socorro	LINEAR	THM	7.7 km	MPC; JPL
15003 Midori	1997 XC_{10}	Midori	December 5, 1997	Oizumi	T. Kobayashi	EOS	9.7 km	MPC; JPL
15004 Vallerani	1997 XL_{10}	Vallerani	December 7, 1997	Asiago	M. Tombelli, G. Forti	EOS	9.6 km	MPC; JPL
15005 Guerriero	1997 XY_{10}	Guerriero	December 7, 1997	Cima Ekar	M. Tombelli, U. Munari	HYG	8.5 km	MPC; JPL
15006 Samcristoforetti	1998 DZ_{32}	Samcristoforetti	February 27, 1998	Cima Ekar	G. Forti, M. Tombelli	·	5.3 km	MPC; JPL
15007 Edoardopozio	1998 NA	Edoardopozio	July 5, 1998	Colleverde	V. S. Casulli	·	5.6 km	MPC; JPL
15008 Delahodde	1998 QO_{6}	Delahodde	August 24, 1998	Caussols	ODAS	·	2.7 km	MPC; JPL
15009 Johnwheeler	1998 QF_{27}	Johnwheeler	August 24, 1998	Socorro	LINEAR	H	1.2 km	MPC; JPL
15010 Storrie-Lombardi	1998 QL_{92}	Storrie-Lombardi	August 28, 1998	Socorro	LINEAR	NYS	4.6 km	MPC; JPL
15011 Castro-Tirado	1998 QM_{92}	Castro-Tirado	August 28, 1998	Socorro	LINEAR	(5)	3.9 km	MPC; JPL
15012	1998 QS_{92}	—	August 28, 1998	Socorro	LINEAR	·	4.3 km	MPC; JPL
15013	1998 QH_{93}	—	August 28, 1998	Socorro	LINEAR	·	11 km	MPC; JPL
15014 Annagekker	1998 RO_{74}	Annagekker	September 14, 1998	Socorro	LINEAR	·	4.9 km	MPC; JPL
15015	1998 RG_{75}	—	September 14, 1998	Socorro	LINEAR	EUN	3.9 km	MPC; JPL
15016	1998 SO_{1}	—	September 16, 1998	Caussols	ODAS	MAS	2.7 km	MPC; JPL
15017 Cuppy	1998 SS_{25}	Cuppy	September 22, 1998	Anderson Mesa	LONEOS	·	1.8 km	MPC; JPL
15018	1998 SM_{34}	—	September 26, 1998	Socorro	LINEAR	·	6.8 km	MPC; JPL
15019 Gingold	1998 SW_{75}	Gingold	September 29, 1998	Socorro	LINEAR	·	2.2 km	MPC; JPL
15020 Brandonimber	1998 SV_{105}	Brandonimber	September 26, 1998	Socorro	LINEAR	MAS	2.9 km	MPC; JPL
15021 Alexkardon	1998 SX_{123}	Alexkardon	September 26, 1998	Socorro	LINEAR	NYS	2.4 km	MPC; JPL
15022 Francinejackson	1998 SM_{144}	Francinejackson	September 20, 1998	La Silla	E. W. Elst	·	3.2 km	MPC; JPL
15023 Ketover	1998 SP_{156}	Ketover	September 26, 1998	Socorro	LINEAR	NYS	2.4 km	MPC; JPL
15024	1998 TB	—	October 2, 1998	Gekko	T. Kagawa	·	6.0 km	MPC; JPL
15025 Uwontario	1998 TX_{28}	Uwontario	October 15, 1998	Kitt Peak	Spacewatch	(1298)	9.4 km	MPC; JPL
15026 Davidscott	1998 TR_{34}	Davidscott	October 14, 1998	Anderson Mesa	LONEOS	(5)	5.2 km	MPC; JPL
15027	1998 UF_{8}	—	October 23, 1998	Višnjan Observatory	K. Korlević	·	4.4 km	MPC; JPL
15028 Soushiyou	1998 UL_{23}	Soushiyou	October 26, 1998	Nanyo	T. Okuni	NYS	5.2 km	MPC; JPL
15029	1998 VC_{5}	—	November 11, 1998	Višnjan Observatory	K. Korlević	·	2.9 km	MPC; JPL
15030 Matthewkroll	1998 VA_{15}	Matthewkroll	November 10, 1998	Socorro	LINEAR	·	6.7 km	MPC; JPL
15031 Lemus	1998 VN_{28}	Lemus	November 10, 1998	Socorro	LINEAR	·	3.2 km	MPC; JPL
15032 Alexlevin	1998 VV_{28}	Alexlevin	November 10, 1998	Socorro	LINEAR	V	3.6 km	MPC; JPL
15033	1998 VY_{29}	—	November 10, 1998	Socorro	LINEAR	L4	33 km	MPC; JPL
15034 Décines	1998 WH	Décines	November 16, 1998	San Marcello	M. Tombelli, L. Tesi	·	5.1 km	MPC; JPL
15035	1998 WS_{3}	—	November 18, 1998	Kushiro	S. Ueda, H. Kaneda	·	4.0 km	MPC; JPL
15036 Giovannianselmi	1998 WO_{5}	Giovannianselmi	November 18, 1998	Dossobuono	Madonna di Dossobuono	V	2.9 km	MPC; JPL
15037 Chassagne	1998 WN_{6}	Chassagne	November 22, 1998	Village-Neuf	Village-Neuf	EOS	8.4 km	MPC; JPL
15038	1998 WQ_{6}	—	November 23, 1998	Oizumi	T. Kobayashi	NYS ·	3.2 km	MPC; JPL
15039	1998 WN_{16}	—	November 21, 1998	Socorro	LINEAR	NYS ·	3.9 km	MPC; JPL
15040 Zhangchao	1998 XC	Zhangchao	December 1, 1998	Xinglong	SCAP	·	5.0 km	MPC; JPL
15041 Paperetti	1998 XB_{5}	Paperetti	December 8, 1998	San Marcello	L. Tesi, A. Boattini	·	2.5 km	MPC; JPL
15042 Anndavgui	1998 XZ_{8}	Anndavgui	December 14, 1998	Le Creusot	J.-C. Merlin	·	5.1 km	MPC; JPL
15043	1998 XW_{9}	—	December 11, 1998	Woomera	F. B. Zoltowski	KOR	6.2 km	MPC; JPL
15044	1998 XY_{16}	—	December 15, 1998	Višnjan Observatory	K. Korlević	·	7.1 km	MPC; JPL
15045 Walesdymond	1998 XY_{21}	Walesdymond	December 10, 1998	Kitt Peak	Spacewatch	AST	6.4 km	MPC; JPL
15046	1998 XY_{41}	—	December 14, 1998	Socorro	LINEAR	NYS	5.0 km	MPC; JPL
15047	1998 XG_{49}	—	December 14, 1998	Socorro	LINEAR	·	5.7 km	MPC; JPL
15048	1998 XQ_{63}	—	December 14, 1998	Socorro	LINEAR	·	4.5 km	MPC; JPL
15049	1998 XA_{90}	—	December 15, 1998	Socorro	LINEAR	EUN	5.1 km	MPC; JPL
15050 Heddal	1998 XC_{96}	Heddal	December 12, 1998	Mérida	Naranjo, O. A.	HYG	13 km	MPC; JPL
15051	1998 YK_{1}	—	December 17, 1998	Kleť	Kleť	·	4.0 km	MPC; JPL
15052 Emileschweitzer	1998 YD_{2}	Emileschweitzer	December 17, 1998	Caussols	ODAS	HYG	9.6 km	MPC; JPL
15053 Bochníček	1998 YY_{2}	Bochníček	December 17, 1998	Ondřejov	P. Pravec, U. Babiaková	·	3.2 km	MPC; JPL
15054	1998 YS_{5}	—	December 21, 1998	Oizumi	T. Kobayashi	EOS	9.6 km	MPC; JPL
15055	1998 YS_{9}	—	December 25, 1998	Višnjan Observatory	K. Korlević, M. Jurić	THM	8.4 km	MPC; JPL
15056 Barbaradixon	1998 YP_{12}	Barbaradixon	December 28, 1998	Jornada	Dixon, D. S.	·	15 km	MPC; JPL
15057 Whitson	1998 YY_{15}	Whitson	December 22, 1998	Kitt Peak	Spacewatch	THM	7.7 km	MPC; JPL
15058 Billcooke	1998 YL_{16}	Billcooke	December 22, 1998	Kitt Peak	Spacewatch	HYG	9.3 km	MPC; JPL
15059	1998 YL_{27}	—	December 25, 1998	Višnjan Observatory	K. Korlević	·	5.9 km	MPC; JPL
15060	1999 AD	—	January 5, 1999	Višnjan Observatory	K. Korlević	·	3.2 km	MPC; JPL
15061	1999 AL	—	January 6, 1999	Višnjan Observatory	K. Korlević	·	12 km	MPC; JPL
15062	1999 AL_{2}	—	January 9, 1999	Oizumi	T. Kobayashi	EOS	7.6 km	MPC; JPL
15063	1999 AQ_{3}	—	January 10, 1999	Oizumi	T. Kobayashi	KOR	5.3 km	MPC; JPL
15064	1999 AC_{4}	—	January 10, 1999	High Point	D. K. Chesney	·	9.1 km	MPC; JPL
15065	1999 AJ_{4}	—	January 9, 1999	Višnjan Observatory	K. Korlević	NYS · fast	2.3 km	MPC; JPL
15066	1999 AX_{7}	—	January 13, 1999	Oizumi	T. Kobayashi	VER	22 km	MPC; JPL
15067 Zhuangtianshan	1999 AM_{9}	Zhuangtianshan	January 10, 1999	Xinglong	SCAP	GEF	4.7 km	MPC; JPL
15068 Wiegert	1999 AJ_{20}	Wiegert	January 13, 1999	Kitt Peak	Spacewatch	3:2	10 km	MPC; JPL
15069	1999 AU_{21}	—	January 15, 1999	Višnjan Observatory	K. Korlević	·	6.1 km	MPC; JPL
15070	1999 BK_{8}	—	January 20, 1999	Nachi-Katsuura	Y. Shimizu, T. Urata	·	3.7 km	MPC; JPL
15071 Hallerstein	1999 BN_{12}	Hallerstein	January 24, 1999	Črni Vrh	Črni Vrh	·	7.8 km	MPC; JPL
15072 Landolt	1999 BS_{12}	Landolt	January 25, 1999	Baton Rouge	W. R. Cooney Jr., P. M. Motl	·	3.6 km	MPC; JPL
15073	1999 BK_{13}	—	January 25, 1999	Višnjan Observatory	K. Korlević	·	15 km	MPC; JPL
15074	1999 BN_{14}	—	January 25, 1999	High Point	D. K. Chesney	THM	11 km	MPC; JPL
15075	1999 BF_{15}	—	January 24, 1999	Višnjan Observatory	K. Korlević	NYS	4.1 km	MPC; JPL
15076 Joellewis	1999 BL_{25}	Joellewis	January 18, 1999	Socorro	LINEAR	·	3.9 km	MPC; JPL
15077 Edyalge	1999 CA	Edyalge	February 2, 1999	Gnosca	S. Sposetti	KOR	7.3 km	MPC; JPL
15078	1999 CW	—	February 5, 1999	Oizumi	T. Kobayashi	(1298)	8.8 km	MPC; JPL
15079	1999 CO_{16}	—	February 15, 1999	Višnjan Observatory	K. Korlević	·	5.1 km	MPC; JPL
15080	1999 CR_{20}	—	February 10, 1999	Socorro	LINEAR	·	6.9 km	MPC; JPL
15081	1999 CU_{25}	—	February 10, 1999	Socorro	LINEAR	KOR	6.7 km	MPC; JPL
15082	1999 CT_{30}	—	February 10, 1999	Socorro	LINEAR	·	18 km	MPC; JPL
15083 Tianhuili	1999 CJ_{34}	Tianhuili	February 10, 1999	Socorro	LINEAR	·	5.0 km	MPC; JPL
15084	1999 CH_{38}	—	February 10, 1999	Socorro	LINEAR	THM	8.6 km	MPC; JPL
15085	1999 CB_{43}	—	February 10, 1999	Socorro	LINEAR	THM	14 km	MPC; JPL
15086	1999 CH_{60}	—	February 12, 1999	Socorro	LINEAR	THM	7.1 km	MPC; JPL
15087	1999 CZ_{61}	—	February 12, 1999	Socorro	LINEAR	·	9.9 km	MPC; JPL
15088 Licitra	1999 CK_{82}	Licitra	February 10, 1999	Socorro	LINEAR	V	2.2 km	MPC; JPL
15089	1999 CQ_{82}	—	February 10, 1999	Socorro	LINEAR	·	8.0 km	MPC; JPL
15090	1999 CA_{97}	—	February 10, 1999	Socorro	LINEAR	KOR	6.7 km	MPC; JPL
15091 Howell	1999 CM_{136}	Howell	February 9, 1999	Kitt Peak	Spacewatch	·	8.8 km	MPC; JPL
15092 Beegees	1999 EH_{5}	Beegees	March 15, 1999	Reedy Creek	J. Broughton	EOS	12 km	MPC; JPL
15093 Lestermackey	1999 TA_{31}	Lestermackey	October 4, 1999	Socorro	LINEAR	·	3.8 km	MPC; JPL
15094 Polymele	1999 WB_{2}	Polymele	November 17, 1999	Catalina	CSS	L4	21 km	MPC; JPL
15095	1999 WO_{3}	—	November 28, 1999	Oizumi	T. Kobayashi	·	3.6 km	MPC; JPL
15096	1999 XH_{12}	—	December 5, 1999	Socorro	LINEAR	·	8.6 km	MPC; JPL
15097	1999 XP_{38}	—	December 8, 1999	Socorro	LINEAR	·	10 km	MPC; JPL
15098	2000 AY_{2}	—	January 1, 2000	San Marcello	G. Forti, A. Boattini	·	2.4 km	MPC; JPL
15099 Janestrohm	2000 AE_{92}	Janestrohm	January 5, 2000	Socorro	LINEAR	·	4.8 km	MPC; JPL
15100	2000 AP_{144}	—	January 5, 2000	Socorro	LINEAR	·	6.0 km	MPC; JPL

== 15101–15200 ==
back to top

Designation			Discovery			Properties		Ref
Permanent	Provisional	Named after	Date	Site	Discoverer(s)	Category	Diam.	Ref
15101	2000 AY_{150}	—	January 8, 2000	Socorro	LINEAR	·	14 km	MPC; JPL
15102	2000 AA_{202}	—	January 9, 2000	Socorro	LINEAR	(10654)	23 km	MPC; JPL
15103	2000 AN_{204}	—	January 8, 2000	Socorro	LINEAR	EUN	4.8 km	MPC; JPL
15104	2000 BV_{3}	—	January 27, 2000	Oizumi	T. Kobayashi	·	16 km	MPC; JPL
15105	2000 BJ_{4}	—	January 21, 2000	Socorro	LINEAR	URS	20 km	MPC; JPL
15106 Swanson	2000 CA_{45}	Swanson	February 2, 2000	Socorro	LINEAR	(5)	4.2 km	MPC; JPL
15107 Toepperwein	2000 CR_{49}	Toepperwein	February 2, 2000	Socorro	LINEAR	moon	2.9 km	MPC; JPL
15108	2000 CT_{61}	—	February 2, 2000	Socorro	LINEAR	·	14 km	MPC; JPL
15109 Wilber	2000 CW_{61}	Wilber	February 2, 2000	Socorro	LINEAR	V	2.5 km	MPC; JPL
15110	2000 CE_{62}	—	February 2, 2000	Socorro	LINEAR	EOS	10 km	MPC; JPL
15111 Winters	2000 CY_{92}	Winters	February 6, 2000	Socorro	LINEAR	·	2.8 km	MPC; JPL
15112 Arlenewolfe	2000 CY_{94}	Arlenewolfe	February 8, 2000	Socorro	LINEAR	slow	7.1 km	MPC; JPL
15113	2000 CO_{96}	—	February 5, 2000	Socorro	LINEAR	·	7.0 km	MPC; JPL
15114	2000 CY_{101}	—	February 12, 2000	Bergisch Gladbach	W. Bickel	·	14 km	MPC; JPL
15115 Yvonneroe	2000 DA_{7}	Yvonneroe	February 29, 2000	Oaxaca	Roe, J. M.	MAS	4.1 km	MPC; JPL
15116 Jaytate	2000 DZ_{12}	Jaytate	February 27, 2000	Kitt Peak	Spacewatch	·	3.9 km	MPC; JPL
15117	2000 DA_{79}	—	February 29, 2000	Socorro	LINEAR	·	8.0 km	MPC; JPL
15118 Elizabethsears	2000 DP_{82}	Elizabethsears	February 28, 2000	Socorro	LINEAR	·	3.7 km	MPC; JPL
15119	2000 DU_{97}	—	February 29, 2000	Socorro	LINEAR	URS	11 km	MPC; JPL
15120 Mariafélix	2000 ES	Mariafélix	March 4, 2000	Marxuquera	Gomez, J. J.	·	2.5 km	MPC; JPL
15121	2000 EN_{14}	—	March 5, 2000	Višnjan Observatory	K. Korlević	·	3.5 km	MPC; JPL
15122	2000 EE_{17}	—	March 3, 2000	Socorro	LINEAR	THM	7.7 km	MPC; JPL
15123	2000 EP_{36}	—	March 8, 2000	Socorro	LINEAR	THM	12 km	MPC; JPL
15124	2000 EZ_{39}	—	March 8, 2000	Socorro	LINEAR	MIS	9.5 km	MPC; JPL
15125	2000 EZ_{41}	—	March 8, 2000	Socorro	LINEAR	THM	9.4 km	MPC; JPL
15126 Brittanyanderson	2000 EA_{44}	Brittanyanderson	March 8, 2000	Socorro	LINEAR	·	2.0 km	MPC; JPL
15127	2000 EN_{45}	—	March 9, 2000	Socorro	LINEAR	·	19 km	MPC; JPL
15128 Patrickjones	2000 EG_{46}	Patrickjones	March 9, 2000	Socorro	LINEAR	·	4.2 km	MPC; JPL
15129 Sparks	2000 ET_{47}	Sparks	March 9, 2000	Socorro	LINEAR	·	2.2 km	MPC; JPL
15130	2000 EU_{49}	—	March 9, 2000	Socorro	LINEAR	·	7.7 km	MPC; JPL
15131 Alanalda	2000 ET_{54}	Alanalda	March 10, 2000	Kitt Peak	Spacewatch	·	6.9 km	MPC; JPL
15132 Steigmeyer	2000 EZ_{69}	Steigmeyer	March 10, 2000	Socorro	LINEAR	slow?	1.8 km	MPC; JPL
15133 Sullivan	2000 EB_{91}	Sullivan	March 9, 2000	Socorro	LINEAR	·	3.9 km	MPC; JPL
15134	2000 ED_{92}	—	March 9, 2000	Socorro	LINEAR	HYG · fast	11 km	MPC; JPL
15135	2000 EG_{92}	—	March 9, 2000	Socorro	LINEAR	EUN · slow	5.9 km	MPC; JPL
15136	2000 EE_{93}	—	March 9, 2000	Socorro	LINEAR	(1118)	22 km	MPC; JPL
15137	2000 EL_{93}	—	March 9, 2000	Socorro	LINEAR	MAR	6.3 km	MPC; JPL
15138	2000 EQ_{93}	—	March 9, 2000	Socorro	LINEAR	EUN	6.6 km	MPC; JPL
15139 Connormcarty	2000 EY_{93}	Connormcarty	March 9, 2000	Socorro	LINEAR	ADE	6.1 km	MPC; JPL
15140	2000 EB_{97}	—	March 10, 2000	Socorro	LINEAR	·	3.7 km	MPC; JPL
15141	2000 EP_{106}	—	March 11, 2000	Kvistaberg	Uppsala-DLR Asteroid Survey	EUN	4.6 km	MPC; JPL
15142	2000 EF_{108}	—	March 8, 2000	Socorro	LINEAR	GEF	5.5 km	MPC; JPL
15143	2000 EX_{108}	—	March 8, 2000	Socorro	LINEAR	EOS · slow	8.2 km	MPC; JPL
15144 Araas	2000 EK_{114}	Araas	March 9, 2000	Socorro	LINEAR	·	3.6 km	MPC; JPL
15145 Ritageorge	2000 EF_{117}	Ritageorge	March 10, 2000	Socorro	LINEAR	·	2.8 km	MPC; JPL
15146 Halpov	2000 EQ_{130}	Halpov	March 11, 2000	Anderson Mesa	LONEOS	KOR	3.9 km	MPC; JPL
15147 Siegfried	2000 EJ_{134}	Siegfried	March 11, 2000	Anderson Mesa	LONEOS	·	18 km	MPC; JPL
15148 Michaelmaryott	2000 EM_{141}	Michaelmaryott	March 2, 2000	Catalina	CSS	·	3.8 km	MPC; JPL
15149 Loufaix	2000 EZ_{141}	Loufaix	March 2, 2000	Catalina	CSS	EUN	5.8 km	MPC; JPL
15150 Salsa	2000 EO_{148}	Salsa	March 4, 2000	Catalina	CSS	·	3.0 km	MPC; JPL
15151 Wilmacherup	2000 EU_{148}	Wilmacherup	March 4, 2000	Catalina	CSS	NYS	3.6 km	MPC; JPL
15152	2000 FJ_{5}	—	March 29, 2000	Oizumi	T. Kobayashi	·	7.8 km	MPC; JPL
15153	2000 FD_{17}	—	March 28, 2000	Socorro	LINEAR	·	20 km	MPC; JPL
15154	2000 FW_{30}	—	March 27, 2000	Kushiro	S. Ueda, H. Kaneda	·	5.5 km	MPC; JPL
15155 Ahn	2000 FB_{37}	Ahn	March 29, 2000	Socorro	LINEAR	·	2.7 km	MPC; JPL
15156	2000 FK_{38}	—	March 29, 2000	Socorro	LINEAR	·	10 km	MPC; JPL
15157	2000 FV_{39}	—	March 29, 2000	Socorro	LINEAR	MAR	4.2 km	MPC; JPL
15158	2000 FH_{40}	—	March 29, 2000	Socorro	LINEAR	·	5.0 km	MPC; JPL
15159	2000 FN_{41}	—	March 29, 2000	Socorro	LINEAR	·	4.8 km	MPC; JPL
15160 Wygoda	2000 FK_{44}	Wygoda	March 29, 2000	Socorro	LINEAR	·	3.7 km	MPC; JPL
15161	2000 FQ_{48}	—	March 30, 2000	Socorro	LINEAR	·	36 km	MPC; JPL
15162	2000 GN_{2}	—	April 5, 2000	Zeno	T. Stafford	V	3.1 km	MPC; JPL
15163	2000 GB_{4}	—	April 2, 2000	Kushiro	S. Ueda, H. Kaneda	ADE	10 km	MPC; JPL
15164	2000 GA_{89}	—	April 4, 2000	Socorro	LINEAR	V	3.7 km	MPC; JPL
15165	2000 GR_{89}	—	April 4, 2000	Socorro	LINEAR	EUN	7.5 km	MPC; JPL
15166	2000 GX_{90}	—	April 4, 2000	Socorro	LINEAR	EUN	8.4 km	MPC; JPL
15167	2000 GS_{135}	—	April 8, 2000	Socorro	LINEAR	·	6.9 km	MPC; JPL
15168 Marijnfranx	2022 P-L	Marijnfranx	September 24, 1960	Palomar	C. J. van Houten, I. van Houten-Groeneveld, T. Gehrels	PAD	8.4 km	MPC; JPL
15169 Wilfriedboland	2629 P-L	Wilfriedboland	September 24, 1960	Palomar	C. J. van Houten, I. van Houten-Groeneveld, T. Gehrels	·	4.9 km	MPC; JPL
15170 Erikdeul	2648 P-L	Erikdeul	September 24, 1960	Palomar	C. J. van Houten, I. van Houten-Groeneveld, T. Gehrels	·	3.3 km	MPC; JPL
15171 Xandertielens	2772 P-L	Xandertielens	September 24, 1960	Palomar	C. J. van Houten, I. van Houten-Groeneveld, T. Gehrels	·	2.1 km	MPC; JPL
15172	3086 P-L	—	September 24, 1960	Palomar	C. J. van Houten, I. van Houten-Groeneveld, T. Gehrels	EOS · slow	10 km	MPC; JPL
15173	3520 P-L	—	October 17, 1960	Palomar	C. J. van Houten, I. van Houten-Groeneveld, T. Gehrels	EOS	7.3 km	MPC; JPL
15174	4649 P-L	—	September 24, 1960	Palomar	C. J. van Houten, I. van Houten-Groeneveld, T. Gehrels	·	7.7 km	MPC; JPL
15175	6113 P-L	—	September 24, 1960	Palomar	C. J. van Houten, I. van Houten-Groeneveld, T. Gehrels	·	3.8 km	MPC; JPL
15176	6299 P-L	—	September 24, 1960	Palomar	C. J. van Houten, I. van Houten-Groeneveld, T. Gehrels	·	6.0 km	MPC; JPL
15177	6599 P-L	—	September 24, 1960	Palomar	C. J. van Houten, I. van Houten-Groeneveld, T. Gehrels	·	4.4 km	MPC; JPL
15178	7075 P-L	—	October 17, 1960	Palomar	C. J. van Houten, I. van Houten-Groeneveld, T. Gehrels	·	7.3 km	MPC; JPL
15179	9062 P-L	—	October 17, 1960	Palomar	C. J. van Houten, I. van Houten-Groeneveld, T. Gehrels	(5)	4.9 km	MPC; JPL
15180	9094 P-L	—	October 17, 1960	Palomar	C. J. van Houten, I. van Houten-Groeneveld, T. Gehrels	·	4.0 km	MPC; JPL
15181	9525 P-L	—	October 17, 1960	Palomar	C. J. van Houten, I. van Houten-Groeneveld, T. Gehrels	·	2.9 km	MPC; JPL
15182	9538 P-L	—	October 17, 1960	Palomar	C. J. van Houten, I. van Houten-Groeneveld, T. Gehrels	·	2.1 km	MPC; JPL
15183	3074 T-1	—	March 26, 1971	Palomar	C. J. van Houten, I. van Houten-Groeneveld, T. Gehrels	·	5.5 km	MPC; JPL
15184	3232 T-1	—	March 26, 1971	Palomar	C. J. van Houten, I. van Houten-Groeneveld, T. Gehrels	EOS	6.0 km	MPC; JPL
15185	4104 T-1	—	March 26, 1971	Palomar	C. J. van Houten, I. van Houten-Groeneveld, T. Gehrels	slow	14 km	MPC; JPL
15186	2058 T-2	—	September 29, 1973	Palomar	C. J. van Houten, I. van Houten-Groeneveld, T. Gehrels	·	2.0 km	MPC; JPL
15187	2112 T-2	—	September 29, 1973	Palomar	C. J. van Houten, I. van Houten-Groeneveld, T. Gehrels	THM	7.8 km	MPC; JPL
15188	3044 T-2	—	September 30, 1973	Palomar	C. J. van Houten, I. van Houten-Groeneveld, T. Gehrels	·	11 km	MPC; JPL
15189	3071 T-2	—	September 30, 1973	Palomar	C. J. van Houten, I. van Houten-Groeneveld, T. Gehrels	·	3.7 km	MPC; JPL
15190	3353 T-2	—	September 25, 1973	Palomar	C. J. van Houten, I. van Houten-Groeneveld, T. Gehrels	·	11 km	MPC; JPL
15191	4234 T-2	—	September 29, 1973	Palomar	C. J. van Houten, I. van Houten-Groeneveld, T. Gehrels	HYG	13 km	MPC; JPL
15192	5049 T-2	—	September 25, 1973	Palomar	C. J. van Houten, I. van Houten-Groeneveld, T. Gehrels	·	2.6 km	MPC; JPL
15193	5148 T-2	—	September 25, 1973	Palomar	C. J. van Houten, I. van Houten-Groeneveld, T. Gehrels	·	3.4 km	MPC; JPL
15194	2272 T-3	—	October 16, 1977	Palomar	C. J. van Houten, I. van Houten-Groeneveld, T. Gehrels	·	2.4 km	MPC; JPL
15195	2407 T-3	—	October 16, 1977	Palomar	C. J. van Houten, I. van Houten-Groeneveld, T. Gehrels	KOR	3.7 km	MPC; JPL
15196	3178 T-3	—	October 16, 1977	Palomar	C. J. van Houten, I. van Houten-Groeneveld, T. Gehrels	·	4.0 km	MPC; JPL
15197	4203 T-3	—	October 16, 1977	Palomar	C. J. van Houten, I. van Houten-Groeneveld, T. Gehrels	EUN	3.6 km	MPC; JPL
15198	1940 GJ	—	April 5, 1940	Turku	L. Oterma	PHO	4.3 km	MPC; JPL
15199 Rodnyanskaya	1974 SE	Rodnyanskaya	September 19, 1974	Nauchnij	L. I. Chernykh	·	3.9 km	MPC; JPL
15200	1975 SU	—	September 30, 1975	Palomar	S. J. Bus	·	20 km	MPC; JPL

== 15201–15300 ==
back to top

Designation			Discovery			Properties		Ref
Permanent	Provisional	Named after	Date	Site	Discoverer(s)	Category	Diam.	Ref
15201	1976 UY	—	October 31, 1976	La Silla	R. M. West	·	4.0 km	MPC; JPL
15202 Yamada-Houkoku	1977 EM_{5}	Yamada-Houkoku	March 12, 1977	Kiso	H. Kosai, K. Furukawa	·	8.1 km	MPC; JPL
15203 Grishanin	1978 SS_{6}	Grishanin	September 26, 1978	Nauchnij	L. V. Zhuravleva	·	9.6 km	MPC; JPL
15204	1978 UG	—	October 28, 1978	Anderson Mesa	H. L. Giclas	NYS	3.1 km	MPC; JPL
15205	1978 VC_{4}	—	November 7, 1978	Palomar	E. F. Helin, S. J. Bus	KOR	3.6 km	MPC; JPL
15206	1978 VJ_{6}	—	November 6, 1978	Palomar	E. F. Helin, S. J. Bus	·	4.7 km	MPC; JPL
15207	1979 KD	—	May 19, 1979	La Silla	R. M. West	slow	9.1 km	MPC; JPL
15208	1979 MW_{1}	—	June 25, 1979	Siding Spring	E. F. Helin, S. J. Bus	·	6.8 km	MPC; JPL
15209	1979 ML_{2}	—	June 25, 1979	Siding Spring	E. F. Helin, S. J. Bus	·	7.0 km	MPC; JPL
15210	1979 MU_{2}	—	June 25, 1979	Siding Spring	E. F. Helin, S. J. Bus	·	6.7 km	MPC; JPL
15211	1979 MW_{3}	—	June 25, 1979	Siding Spring	E. F. Helin, S. J. Bus	·	2.6 km	MPC; JPL
15212 Yaroslavlʹ	1979 WY_{3}	Yaroslavlʹ	November 17, 1979	Nauchnij	L. I. Chernykh	GEF	6.3 km	MPC; JPL
15213	1980 UO_{1}	—	October 31, 1980	Palomar	S. J. Bus	·	16 km	MPC; JPL
15214 Duart	1981 DY	Duart	February 28, 1981	Siding Spring	S. J. Bus	·	8.6 km	MPC; JPL
15215 Lachlanmaclean	1981 EH_{13}	Lachlanmaclean	March 1, 1981	Siding Spring	S. J. Bus	·	3.8 km	MPC; JPL
15216	1981 EX_{14}	—	March 1, 1981	Siding Spring	S. J. Bus	GEF	2.6 km	MPC; JPL
15217	1981 ET_{19}	—	March 2, 1981	Siding Spring	S. J. Bus	MAS	1.5 km	MPC; JPL
15218	1981 EO_{41}	—	March 2, 1981	Siding Spring	S. J. Bus	·	6.3 km	MPC; JPL
15219	1981 EY_{42}	—	March 2, 1981	Siding Spring	S. J. Bus	MAS	1.7 km	MPC; JPL
15220 Sumerkin	1981 SC_{7}	Sumerkin	September 28, 1981	Nauchnij	L. V. Zhuravleva	·	5.5 km	MPC; JPL
15221	1981 UA_{23}	—	October 24, 1981	Palomar	S. J. Bus	·	2.4 km	MPC; JPL
15222	1982 FL_{1}	—	March 24, 1982	Kleť	A. Mrkos	THM	15 km	MPC; JPL
15223	1984 SN_{4}	—	September 21, 1984	La Silla	H. Debehogne	·	3.8 km	MPC; JPL
15224 Penttilä	1985 JG	Penttilä	May 15, 1985	Anderson Mesa	E. Bowell	PHO	7.9 km	MPC; JPL
15225	1985 RJ_{4}	—	September 11, 1985	La Silla	H. Debehogne	·	10 km	MPC; JPL
15226	1986 UP	—	October 28, 1986	Kleť	Z. Vávrová	PHO · fast	4.2 km	MPC; JPL
15227	1986 VA	—	November 4, 1986	Siding Spring	R. H. McNaught	EOS	8.5 km	MPC; JPL
15228 Ronmiller	1987 DG	Ronmiller	February 23, 1987	Palomar	C. S. Shoemaker, E. M. Shoemaker	·	2.4 km	MPC; JPL
15229	1987 QZ_{6}	—	August 22, 1987	La Silla	E. W. Elst	·	3.6 km	MPC; JPL
15230 Alona	1987 RF_{1}	Alona	September 13, 1987	La Silla	H. Debehogne	·	3.4 km	MPC; JPL
15231 Ehdita	1987 RO_{5}	Ehdita	September 4, 1987	Nauchnij	L. V. Zhuravleva	T_{j} (2.97) · 3:2	23 km	MPC; JPL
15232	1987 SD_{13}	—	September 24, 1987	La Silla	H. Debehogne	·	6.8 km	MPC; JPL
15233	1987 WU_{4}	—	November 26, 1987	Kleť	A. Mrkos	(5)	3.8 km	MPC; JPL
15234	1988 BJ_{5}	—	January 28, 1988	Siding Spring	R. H. McNaught	·	4.7 km	MPC; JPL
15235	1988 DA_{5}	—	February 25, 1988	Siding Spring	R. H. McNaught	·	13 km	MPC; JPL
15236	1988 RJ_{4}	—	September 1, 1988	La Silla	H. Debehogne	·	3.5 km	MPC; JPL
15237	1988 RL_{6}	—	September 6, 1988	La Silla	H. Debehogne	slow	2.6 km	MPC; JPL
15238 Hisaohori	1989 CQ	Hisaohori	February 2, 1989	Geisei	T. Seki	·	2.7 km	MPC; JPL
15239 Stenhammar	1989 CR_{2}	Stenhammar	February 4, 1989	La Silla	E. W. Elst	EOS	7.1 km	MPC; JPL
15240	1989 GF_{3}	—	April 3, 1989	La Silla	E. W. Elst	slow	3.1 km	MPC; JPL
15241	1989 ST_{3}	—	September 26, 1989	La Silla	E. W. Elst	slow?	2.8 km	MPC; JPL
15242	1989 SX_{5}	—	September 26, 1989	La Silla	E. W. Elst	·	4.4 km	MPC; JPL
15243	1989 TU_{1}	—	October 9, 1989	Gekko	Y. Oshima	slow	9.7 km	MPC; JPL
15244	1989 TY_{2}	—	October 7, 1989	La Silla	E. W. Elst	·	4.4 km	MPC; JPL
15245	1989 TP_{16}	—	October 4, 1989	La Silla	H. Debehogne	THM	11 km	MPC; JPL
15246 Kumeta	1989 VS_{1}	Kumeta	November 2, 1989	Kitami	K. Endate, K. Watanabe	·	8.0 km	MPC; JPL
15247	1989 WS	—	November 20, 1989	Kushiro	S. Ueda, H. Kaneda	·	4.4 km	MPC; JPL
15248 Hidekazu	1989 WH_{3}	Hidekazu	November 29, 1989	Kitami	K. Endate, K. Watanabe	·	5.0 km	MPC; JPL
15249 Capodimonte	1989 YB_{5}	Capodimonte	December 28, 1989	Haute Provence	E. W. Elst	·	21 km	MPC; JPL
15250 Nishiyamahiro	1990 DZ	Nishiyamahiro	February 28, 1990	Kitami	K. Endate, K. Watanabe	·	4.9 km	MPC; JPL
15251	1990 EF_{2}	—	March 2, 1990	La Silla	E. W. Elst	·	2.1 km	MPC; JPL
15252 Yoshiken	1990 OD_{1}	Yoshiken	July 20, 1990	Geisei	T. Seki	V	3.4 km	MPC; JPL
15253	1990 QA_{4}	—	August 23, 1990	Palomar	H. E. Holt	·	7.1 km	MPC; JPL
15254	1990 QM_{4}	—	August 23, 1990	Palomar	H. E. Holt	·	4.0 km	MPC; JPL
15255	1990 QQ_{8}	—	August 16, 1990	La Silla	E. W. Elst	THM	9.5 km	MPC; JPL
15256	1990 RD_{1}	—	September 14, 1990	Palomar	H. E. Holt	VER	15 km	MPC; JPL
15257	1990 RQ_{8}	—	September 15, 1990	La Silla	H. Debehogne	THM	8.4 km	MPC; JPL
15258 Alfilipenko	1990 RN_{17}	Alfilipenko	September 15, 1990	Nauchnij	L. V. Zhuravleva	·	12 km	MPC; JPL
15259	1990 SL_{7}	—	September 22, 1990	La Silla	E. W. Elst	NYS	2.4 km	MPC; JPL
15260	1990 SY_{8}	—	September 22, 1990	La Silla	E. W. Elst	·	2.4 km	MPC; JPL
15261	1990 SV_{12}	—	September 21, 1990	La Silla	H. Debehogne	THM	11 km	MPC; JPL
15262 Abderhalden	1990 TG_{4}	Abderhalden	October 12, 1990	Tautenburg Observatory	F. Börngen, L. D. Schmadel	THM	12 km	MPC; JPL
15263 Erwingroten	1990 TY_{7}	Erwingroten	October 13, 1990	Tautenburg Observatory	L. D. Schmadel, F. Börngen	NYS	3.2 km	MPC; JPL
15264 Delbrück	1990 TU_{11}	Delbrück	October 11, 1990	Tautenburg Observatory	F. Börngen, L. D. Schmadel	NYS ·	5.8 km	MPC; JPL
15265 Ernsting	1990 TG_{13}	Ernsting	October 12, 1990	Tautenburg Observatory	L. D. Schmadel, F. Börngen	·	6.3 km	MPC; JPL
15266	1990 UQ_{3}	—	October 16, 1990	La Silla	E. W. Elst	·	3.0 km	MPC; JPL
15267 Kolyma	1990 VX_{4}	Kolyma	November 15, 1990	La Silla	E. W. Elst	PHO	7.4 km	MPC; JPL
15268 Wendelinefroger	1990 WF_{3}	Wendelinefroger	November 18, 1990	La Silla	E. W. Elst	NYS · moon	4.5 km	MPC; JPL
15269	1990 XF	—	December 8, 1990	Yatsugatake	Y. Kushida, O. Muramatsu	·	11 km	MPC; JPL
15270	1991 AE_{2}	—	January 7, 1991	Siding Spring	R. H. McNaught	EUN	4.6 km	MPC; JPL
15271	1991 DE	—	February 19, 1991	Oohira	T. Urata	·	6.7 km	MPC; JPL
15272	1991 GH	—	April 3, 1991	Dynic	A. Sugie	EUN	7.0 km	MPC; JPL
15273 Ruhmkorff	1991 GQ_{3}	Ruhmkorff	April 8, 1991	La Silla	E. W. Elst	EUN	5.5 km	MPC; JPL
15274	1991 GO_{6}	—	April 8, 1991	La Silla	E. W. Elst	MAR · slow	5.1 km	MPC; JPL
15275	1991 GV_{6}	—	April 8, 1991	La Silla	E. W. Elst	·	5.2 km	MPC; JPL
15276 Diebel	1991 GA_{10}	Diebel	April 14, 1991	Palomar	C. S. Shoemaker, D. H. Levy	·	7.4 km	MPC; JPL
15277	1991 PC_{7}	—	August 6, 1991	La Silla	E. W. Elst	KOR	5.6 km	MPC; JPL
15278 Pâquet	1991 PG_{7}	Pâquet	August 6, 1991	La Silla	E. W. Elst	T_{j} (2.99) · 3:2	25 km	MPC; JPL
15279	1991 PY_{7}	—	August 6, 1991	La Silla	E. W. Elst	·	2.3 km	MPC; JPL
15280	1991 PW_{11}	—	August 7, 1991	Palomar	H. E. Holt	·	3.6 km	MPC; JPL
15281	1991 PT_{16}	—	August 7, 1991	Palomar	H. E. Holt	KOR	7.4 km	MPC; JPL
15282 Franzmarc	1991 RX_{4}	Franzmarc	September 13, 1991	Tautenburg Observatory	F. Börngen, L. D. Schmadel	·	6.8 km	MPC; JPL
15283	1991 RB_{8}	—	September 12, 1991	Palomar	H. E. Holt	·	3.5 km	MPC; JPL
15284	1991 RZ_{16}	—	September 15, 1991	Palomar	H. E. Holt	·	2.5 km	MPC; JPL
15285	1991 RW_{18}	—	September 14, 1991	Palomar	H. E. Holt	·	10 km	MPC; JPL
15286	1991 RJ_{22}	—	September 15, 1991	Palomar	H. E. Holt	·	3.2 km	MPC; JPL
15287	1991 RX_{25}	—	September 12, 1991	Palomar	H. E. Holt	·	2.8 km	MPC; JPL
15288	1991 RN_{27}	—	September 11, 1991	Palomar	H. E. Holt	MAR	8.4 km	MPC; JPL
15289	1991 TL	—	October 1, 1991	Siding Spring	R. H. McNaught	·	2.5 km	MPC; JPL
15290	1991 TF_{1}	—	October 12, 1991	Siding Spring	R. H. McNaught	·	13 km	MPC; JPL
15291	1991 VO_{1}	—	November 4, 1991	Kushiro	S. Ueda, H. Kaneda	·	3.2 km	MPC; JPL
15292	1991 VD_{2}	—	November 9, 1991	Kushiro	S. Ueda, H. Kaneda	THM	12 km	MPC; JPL
15293	1991 VO_{3}	—	November 4, 1991	Kushiro	S. Ueda, H. Kaneda	·	6.8 km	MPC; JPL
15294 Underwood	1991 VD_{5}	Underwood	November 7, 1991	Palomar	C. S. Shoemaker, D. H. Levy	·	3.2 km	MPC; JPL
15295 Tante Riek	1991 VA_{9}	Tante Riek	November 4, 1991	Kitt Peak	Spacewatch	V	3.0 km	MPC; JPL
15296 Tantetruus	1992 AS_{2}	Tantetruus	January 2, 1992	Kitt Peak	Spacewatch	MAS	2.1 km	MPC; JPL
15297	1992 CF	—	February 8, 1992	Kiyosato	S. Otomo	·	4.8 km	MPC; JPL
15298 Minde	1992 EB_{13}	Minde	March 2, 1992	La Silla	UESAC	·	4.1 km	MPC; JPL
15299 Rådbo	1992 ER_{17}	Rådbo	March 1, 1992	La Silla	UESAC	NYS	3.6 km	MPC; JPL
15300	1992 RV_{2}	—	September 2, 1992	La Silla	E. W. Elst	·	7.5 km	MPC; JPL

== 15301–15400 ==
back to top

Designation			Discovery			Properties		Ref
Permanent	Provisional	Named after	Date	Site	Discoverer(s)	Category	Diam.	Ref
15301 Marutesser	1992 SC_{2}	Marutesser	September 21, 1992	Tautenburg Observatory	L. D. Schmadel, F. Börngen	KOR	4.1 km	MPC; JPL
15302	1992 TJ_{1}	—	October 2, 1992	Palomar	H. E. Holt	EUN	7.7 km	MPC; JPL
15303 Hatoyamamachi	1992 UJ_{2}	Hatoyamamachi	October 19, 1992	Kitami	K. Endate, K. Watanabe	EOS	8.5 km	MPC; JPL
15304 Wikberg	1992 UX_{4}	Wikberg	October 21, 1992	Palomar	C. S. Shoemaker, E. M. Shoemaker	·	9.0 km	MPC; JPL
15305	1992 WT_{1}	—	November 18, 1992	Dynic	A. Sugie	·	13 km	MPC; JPL
15306	1992 WK_{2}	—	November 18, 1992	Kushiro	S. Ueda, H. Kaneda	·	3.6 km	MPC; JPL
15307	1992 XK	—	December 15, 1992	Kiyosato	S. Otomo	NYS	5.4 km	MPC; JPL
15308 Ulfdanielsson	1993 FR_{4}	Ulfdanielsson	March 17, 1993	La Silla	UESAC	·	3.2 km	MPC; JPL
15309 Bragée	1993 FZ_{7}	Bragée	March 17, 1993	La Silla	UESAC	·	1.8 km	MPC; JPL
15310 Meir	1993 FT_{19}	Meir	March 17, 1993	La Silla	UESAC	·	4.7 km	MPC; JPL
15311 Västerberg	1993 FZ_{22}	Västerberg	March 21, 1993	La Silla	UESAC	·	2.4 km	MPC; JPL
15312 Wandt	1993 FH_{27}	Wandt	March 21, 1993	La Silla	UESAC	slow	8.8 km	MPC; JPL
15313 Ynnerman	1993 FM_{28}	Ynnerman	March 21, 1993	La Silla	UESAC	NYS	3.1 km	MPC; JPL
15314 Stenbergwieser	1993 FL_{34}	Stenbergwieser	March 17, 1993	La Silla	UESAC	CYB	13 km	MPC; JPL
15315 Sundin	1993 FX_{35}	Sundin	March 19, 1993	La Silla	UESAC	PHO	3.9 km	MPC; JPL
15316 Okagakimachi	1993 HH_{1}	Okagakimachi	April 20, 1993	Kitami	K. Endate, K. Watanabe	·	3.3 km	MPC; JPL
15317	1993 HW_{1}	—	April 23, 1993	Palomar	E. F. Helin	PHO	5.1 km	MPC; JPL
15318 Innsbruck	1993 KX_{1}	Innsbruck	May 24, 1993	Palomar	C. S. Shoemaker	PHO	6.1 km	MPC; JPL
15319	1993 NU_{1}	—	July 12, 1993	La Silla	E. W. Elst	NYS	4.4 km	MPC; JPL
15320	1993 OQ_{8}	—	July 20, 1993	La Silla	E. W. Elst	MAS	2.2 km	MPC; JPL
15321 Donnadean	1993 PE_{8}	Donnadean	August 13, 1993	Palomar	C. S. Shoemaker, D. H. Levy	·	4.9 km	MPC; JPL
15322	1993 QY	—	August 16, 1993	Caussols	E. W. Elst	·	5.1 km	MPC; JPL
15323	1993 QH_{4}	—	August 18, 1993	Caussols	E. W. Elst	THM	8.2 km	MPC; JPL
15324	1993 QO_{4}	—	August 18, 1993	Caussols	E. W. Elst	THM	7.4 km	MPC; JPL
15325	1993 QN_{7}	—	August 20, 1993	La Silla	E. W. Elst	·	3.2 km	MPC; JPL
15326	1993 QA_{9}	—	August 20, 1993	La Silla	E. W. Elst	NYS	3.2 km	MPC; JPL
15327	1993 RA_{3}	—	September 14, 1993	Palomar	E. F. Helin	EUN	5.1 km	MPC; JPL
15328	1993 RJ_{9}	—	September 14, 1993	La Silla	H. Debehogne, E. W. Elst	NYS	4.0 km	MPC; JPL
15329 Sabena	1993 SN_{7}	Sabena	September 17, 1993	La Silla	E. W. Elst	·	7.1 km	MPC; JPL
15330 de Almeida	1993 TO	de Almeida	October 8, 1993	Kitami	K. Endate, K. Watanabe	·	8.9 km	MPC; JPL
15331	1993 TO_{24}	—	October 9, 1993	La Silla	E. W. Elst	·	6.9 km	MPC; JPL
15332 CERN	1993 TU_{24}	CERN	October 9, 1993	La Silla	E. W. Elst	·	7.1 km	MPC; JPL
15333	1993 TS_{36}	—	October 13, 1993	Palomar	H. E. Holt	slow	9.3 km	MPC; JPL
15334	1993 UE	—	October 20, 1993	Siding Spring	R. H. McNaught	PHO	4.6 km	MPC; JPL
15335 Satoyukie	1993 UV	Satoyukie	October 23, 1993	Oizumi	T. Kobayashi	JUN	3.6 km	MPC; JPL
15336	1993 UC_{3}	—	October 22, 1993	Nyukasa	M. Hirasawa, S. Suzuki	·	6.8 km	MPC; JPL
15337	1993 VT_{2}	—	November 7, 1993	Siding Spring	R. H. McNaught	·	5.2 km	MPC; JPL
15338 Dufault	1994 AZ_{4}	Dufault	January 5, 1994	Kitt Peak	Spacewatch	·	3.9 km	MPC; JPL
15339 Pierazzo	1994 AA_{9}	Pierazzo	January 8, 1994	Kitt Peak	Spacewatch	KOR	5.0 km	MPC; JPL
15340	1994 CE_{14}	—	February 8, 1994	La Silla	E. W. Elst	EOS	5.5 km	MPC; JPL
15341	1994 CV_{16}	—	February 8, 1994	La Silla	E. W. Elst	KOR	5.2 km	MPC; JPL
15342 Assisi	1994 GD_{10}	Assisi	April 3, 1994	Tautenburg Observatory	F. Börngen	THM	8.6 km	MPC; JPL
15343 Von Wohlgemuth	1994 PB_{1}	Von Wohlgemuth	August 15, 1994	Farra d'Isonzo	Farra d'Isonzo	·	2.1 km	MPC; JPL
15344	1994 PA_{2}	—	August 9, 1994	Palomar	PCAS	·	2.9 km	MPC; JPL
15345	1994 PK_{11}	—	August 10, 1994	La Silla	E. W. Elst	·	8.1 km	MPC; JPL
15346 Bonifatius	1994 RT_{11}	Bonifatius	September 2, 1994	Tautenburg Observatory	F. Börngen	V	2.1 km	MPC; JPL
15347 Colinstuart	1994 UD	Colinstuart	October 26, 1994	Stakenbridge	B. G. W. Manning	·	4.4 km	MPC; JPL
15348	1994 UJ	—	October 31, 1994	Oizumi	T. Kobayashi	·	2.6 km	MPC; JPL
15349	1994 UX_{1}	—	October 31, 1994	Kushiro	S. Ueda, H. Kaneda	NYS	3.4 km	MPC; JPL
15350 Naganuma	1994 VB_{2}	Naganuma	November 3, 1994	Yatsugatake	Y. Kushida, O. Muramatsu	·	4.4 km	MPC; JPL
15351 Yamaguchimamoru	1994 VO_{6}	Yamaguchimamoru	November 4, 1994	Kitami	K. Endate, K. Watanabe	·	3.8 km	MPC; JPL
15352	1994 VB_{7}	—	November 11, 1994	Nyukasa	M. Hirasawa, S. Suzuki	·	2.9 km	MPC; JPL
15353 Meucci	1994 WA	Meucci	November 22, 1994	Colleverde	V. S. Casulli	·	3.5 km	MPC; JPL
15354	1994 YN_{1}	—	December 31, 1994	Oizumi	T. Kobayashi	NYS ·	5.6 km	MPC; JPL
15355 Maupassant	1995 AZ_{3}	Maupassant	January 2, 1995	Caussols	E. W. Elst	·	5.0 km	MPC; JPL
15356	1995 DE	—	February 20, 1995	Oizumi	T. Kobayashi	MAR	5.0 km	MPC; JPL
15357	1995 FM	—	March 26, 1995	Nachi-Katsuura	Y. Shimizu, T. Urata	·	6.9 km	MPC; JPL
15358 Kintner	1995 FM_{8}	Kintner	March 26, 1995	Kitt Peak	Spacewatch	·	8.5 km	MPC; JPL
15359 Dressler	1995 GV_{2}	Dressler	April 2, 1995	Kitt Peak	Spacewatch	·	7.0 km	MPC; JPL
15360 Moncalvo	1996 CY_{7}	Moncalvo	February 14, 1996	Cima Ekar	M. Tombelli, G. Forti	·	2.9 km	MPC; JPL
15361	1996 DK_{2}	—	February 23, 1996	Oizumi	T. Kobayashi	·	3.8 km	MPC; JPL
15362	1996 ED	—	March 9, 1996	Oizumi	T. Kobayashi	·	4.5 km	MPC; JPL
15363 Ysaÿe	1996 FT_{6}	Ysaÿe	March 18, 1996	Kitt Peak	Spacewatch	·	2.5 km	MPC; JPL
15364 Kenglover	1996 HT_{2}	Kenglover	April 17, 1996	Kitt Peak	Spacewatch	PHO	3.5 km	MPC; JPL
15365	1996 HQ_{9}	—	April 17, 1996	La Silla	E. W. Elst	·	7.8 km	MPC; JPL
15366	1996 HR_{16}	—	April 18, 1996	La Silla	E. W. Elst	EUN	3.6 km	MPC; JPL
15367	1996 HP_{23}	—	April 20, 1996	La Silla	E. W. Elst	·	3.0 km	MPC; JPL
15368 Katsuji	1996 JZ	Katsuji	May 14, 1996	Moriyama	R. H. McNaught, Ikari, Y.	·	6.2 km	MPC; JPL
15369	1996 KB	—	May 16, 1996	Haleakala	NEAT	·	5.8 km	MPC; JPL
15370 Kanchi	1996 NW	Kanchi	July 15, 1996	Kuma Kogen	A. Nakamura	·	4.3 km	MPC; JPL
15371 Steward	1996 RZ_{18}	Steward	September 15, 1996	Kitt Peak	Spacewatch	·	4.8 km	MPC; JPL
15372 Agrigento	1996 TK_{41}	Agrigento	October 8, 1996	La Silla	E. W. Elst	CYB	10 km	MPC; JPL
15373	1996 WV_{1}	—	November 20, 1996	Xinglong	SCAP	HIL · 3:2	13 km	MPC; JPL
15374 Teta	1997 BG	Teta	January 16, 1997	Kleť	M. Tichý, Z. Moravec	H	2.7 km	MPC; JPL
15375 Laetitiafoglia	1997 BO_{9}	Laetitiafoglia	January 30, 1997	Cima Ekar	U. Munari, M. Tombelli	·	2.4 km	MPC; JPL
15376 Marták	1997 CT_{1}	Marták	February 1, 1997	Modra	L. Kornoš, P. Kolény	T_{j} (2.97)	18 km	MPC; JPL
15377	1997 KW	—	May 31, 1997	Xinglong	SCAP	·	2.3 km	MPC; JPL
15378 Artin	1997 PJ_{2}	Artin	August 7, 1997	Prescott	P. G. Comba	·	2.3 km	MPC; JPL
15379 Alefranz	1997 QG_{1}	Alefranz	August 29, 1997	Sormano	P. Sicoli, P. Chiavenna	·	5.7 km	MPC; JPL
15380	1997 QQ_{4}	—	August 30, 1997	Caussols	ODAS	·	3.1 km	MPC; JPL
15381 Spadolini	1997 RB_{1}	Spadolini	September 1, 1997	Pianoro	V. Goretti	·	3.0 km	MPC; JPL
15382 Vian	1997 SN	Vian	September 20, 1997	Ondřejov	L. Kotková	·	2.1 km	MPC; JPL
15383	1997 SE_{3}	—	September 21, 1997	Woomera	F. B. Zoltowski	EUN	4.2 km	MPC; JPL
15384 Samková	1997 SC_{4}	Samková	September 26, 1997	Ondřejov	P. Pravec	KOR	3.6 km	MPC; JPL
15385 Dallolmo	1997 SP_{4}	Dallolmo	September 25, 1997	Bologna	San Vittore	EOS	5.2 km	MPC; JPL
15386 Nicolini	1997 ST_{4}	Nicolini	September 25, 1997	Dossobuono	Madonna di Dossobuono	V	1.8 km	MPC; JPL
15387 Hanazukayama	1997 SQ_{17}	Hanazukayama	September 30, 1997	Nanyo	T. Okuni	PHO	6.1 km	MPC; JPL
15388 Coelum	1997 ST_{17}	Coelum	September 27, 1997	Bologna	San Vittore	NYS	3.5 km	MPC; JPL
15389 Geflorsch	1997 TL_{6}	Geflorsch	October 2, 1997	Caussols	ODAS	NYS	3.3 km	MPC; JPL
15390 Znojil	1997 TJ_{10}	Znojil	October 6, 1997	Ondřejov	P. Pravec	·	3.8 km	MPC; JPL
15391 Steliomancinelli	1997 TS_{16}	Steliomancinelli	October 3, 1997	Stroncone	A. Vagnozzi	·	3.0 km	MPC; JPL
15392 Budějický	1997 TO_{19}	Budějický	October 11, 1997	Ondřejov	L. Kotková	·	2.7 km	MPC; JPL
15393	1997 TR_{24}	—	October 9, 1997	Xinglong	SCAP	·	13 km	MPC; JPL
15394	1997 TQ_{25}	—	October 12, 1997	Xinglong	SCAP	·	5.6 km	MPC; JPL
15395 Rükl	1997 UV	Rükl	October 21, 1997	Ondřejov	P. Pravec	·	7.3 km	MPC; JPL
15396 Howardmoore	1997 UG_{2}	Howardmoore	October 24, 1997	Prescott	P. G. Comba	·	4.8 km	MPC; JPL
15397 Ksoari	1997 UK_{7}	Ksoari	October 27, 1997	Heppenheim	Starkenburg	·	3.2 km	MPC; JPL
15398	1997 UZ_{23}	—	October 30, 1997	Anderson Mesa	B. A. Skiff	L4	36 km	MPC; JPL
15399 Hudec	1997 VE	Hudec	November 2, 1997	Kleť	J. Tichá, M. Tichý	·	4.4 km	MPC; JPL
15400	1997 VZ	—	November 1, 1997	Oizumi	T. Kobayashi	·	9.5 km	MPC; JPL

== 15401–15500 ==
back to top

Designation			Discovery			Properties		Ref
Permanent	Provisional	Named after	Date	Site	Discoverer(s)	Category	Diam.	Ref
15401	1997 VE_{4}	—	November 4, 1997	Gekko	T. Kagawa, T. Urata	·	9.8 km	MPC; JPL
15402 Suzaku	1997 VY_{5}	Suzaku	November 9, 1997	Moriyama	Ikari, Y.	MAS	2.8 km	MPC; JPL
15403 Mérignac	1997 VH_{6}	Mérignac	November 9, 1997	Ondřejov	L. Kotková	·	4.8 km	MPC; JPL
15404	1997 VE_{8}	—	November 6, 1997	Xinglong	SCAP	slow	6.2 km	MPC; JPL
15405	1997 WJ_{7}	—	November 19, 1997	Nachi-Katsuura	Y. Shimizu, T. Urata	·	4.8 km	MPC; JPL
15406 Bleibtreu	1997 WV_{12}	Bleibtreu	November 23, 1997	Kitt Peak	Spacewatch	·	5.2 km	MPC; JPL
15407 Udakiyoo	1997 WM_{16}	Udakiyoo	November 24, 1997	Moriyama	Ikari, Y.	·	4.6 km	MPC; JPL
15408	1997 WU_{21}	—	November 30, 1997	Oizumi	T. Kobayashi	·	8.5 km	MPC; JPL
15409	1997 WQ_{31}	—	November 29, 1997	Socorro	LINEAR	KOR	6.7 km	MPC; JPL
15410	1997 YZ	—	December 19, 1997	Woomera	F. B. Zoltowski	·	23 km	MPC; JPL
15411	1997 YL_{1}	—	December 18, 1997	Xinglong	SCAP	V	3.4 km	MPC; JPL
15412 Schaefer	1998 AU_{3}	Schaefer	January 2, 1998	Kitt Peak	Spacewatch	THM	11 km	MPC; JPL
15413 Beaglehole	1998 BX_{9}	Beaglehole	January 22, 1998	Kitt Peak	Spacewatch	·	6.2 km	MPC; JPL
15414 Pettirossi	1998 BC_{35}	Pettirossi	January 26, 1998	Kitt Peak	Spacewatch	KOR	4.2 km	MPC; JPL
15415 Rika	1998 CA_{1}	Rika	February 4, 1998	Kuma Kogen	A. Nakamura	·	2.8 km	MPC; JPL
15416	1998 DZ_{2}	—	February 21, 1998	Xinglong	SCAP	MAR	8.6 km	MPC; JPL
15417 Babylon	1998 DH_{34}	Babylon	February 27, 1998	La Silla	E. W. Elst	3:2	30 km	MPC; JPL
15418 Sergiospinelli	1998 DU_{35}	Sergiospinelli	February 27, 1998	Cima Ekar	G. Forti, M. Tombelli	·	14 km	MPC; JPL
15419	1998 FZ_{62}	—	March 20, 1998	Socorro	LINEAR	EUN	6.0 km	MPC; JPL
15420 Aedouglass	1998 HQ_{31}	Aedouglass	April 28, 1998	Kitt Peak	Spacewatch	·	3.8 km	MPC; JPL
15421 Adammalin	1998 HM_{81}	Adammalin	April 21, 1998	Socorro	LINEAR	KOR	4.4 km	MPC; JPL
15422	1998 QP_{45}	—	August 17, 1998	Socorro	LINEAR	·	12 km	MPC; JPL
15423	1998 QR_{91}	—	August 28, 1998	Socorro	LINEAR	·	2.3 km	MPC; JPL
15424	1998 QE_{100}	—	August 26, 1998	La Silla	E. W. Elst	NYS	6.0 km	MPC; JPL
15425 Welzl	1998 SV_{26}	Welzl	September 24, 1998	Ondřejov	P. Pravec	EUN	7.2 km	MPC; JPL
15426	1998 SW_{43}	—	September 26, 1998	Xinglong	SCAP	3:2	14 km	MPC; JPL
15427 Shabas	1998 SP_{61}	Shabas	September 17, 1998	Anderson Mesa	LONEOS	·	10 km	MPC; JPL
15428	1998 SV_{128}	—	September 26, 1998	Socorro	LINEAR	·	16 km	MPC; JPL
15429	1998 UA_{23}	—	October 30, 1998	Višnjan Observatory	K. Korlević	NYS	2.9 km	MPC; JPL
15430	1998 UR_{31}	—	October 22, 1998	Xinglong	SCAP	moon	3.7 km	MPC; JPL
15431	1998 UQ_{32}	—	October 30, 1998	Xinglong	SCAP	·	3.3 km	MPC; JPL
15432	1998 VA_{5}	—	November 11, 1998	Višnjan Observatory	K. Korlević	·	4.8 km	MPC; JPL
15433	1998 VQ_{7}	—	November 10, 1998	Socorro	LINEAR	V	3.5 km	MPC; JPL
15434 Mittal	1998 VM_{25}	Mittal	November 10, 1998	Socorro	LINEAR	·	2.6 km	MPC; JPL
15435	1998 VS_{28}	—	November 10, 1998	Socorro	LINEAR	·	2.6 km	MPC; JPL
15436 Dexius	1998 VU_{30}	Dexius	November 10, 1998	Socorro	LINEAR	L4	88 km	MPC; JPL
15437	1998 VS_{35}	—	November 9, 1998	Xinglong	SCAP	NYS	4.3 km	MPC; JPL
15438 Joegotobed	1998 WF_{1}	Joegotobed	November 17, 1998	Catalina	CSS	BAR	5.3 km	MPC; JPL
15439	1998 WV_{1}	—	November 18, 1998	Oizumi	T. Kobayashi	·	2.9 km	MPC; JPL
15440 Eioneus	1998 WX_{4}	Eioneus	November 19, 1998	Catalina	CSS	L4	63 km	MPC; JPL
15441	1998 WJ_{9}	—	November 27, 1998	Višnjan Observatory	K. Korlević	·	7.3 km	MPC; JPL
15442	1998 WN_{11}	—	November 21, 1998	Socorro	LINEAR	L4	20 km	MPC; JPL
15443	1998 WM_{19}	—	November 23, 1998	Socorro	LINEAR	(5)	2.9 km	MPC; JPL
15444	1998 WT_{23}	—	November 25, 1998	Socorro	LINEAR	·	8.9 km	MPC; JPL
15445	1998 XE	—	December 1, 1998	Xinglong	SCAP	ADE	12 km	MPC; JPL
15446	1998 XQ_{4}	—	December 12, 1998	Oizumi	T. Kobayashi	·	4.8 km	MPC; JPL
15447	1998 XV_{4}	—	December 12, 1998	Oizumi	T. Kobayashi	·	4.4 km	MPC; JPL
15448 Siegwarth	1998 XT_{21}	Siegwarth	December 10, 1998	Kitt Peak	Spacewatch	·	7.6 km	MPC; JPL
15449	1998 XS_{30}	—	December 14, 1998	Socorro	LINEAR	EUN	4.8 km	MPC; JPL
15450	1998 XV_{40}	—	December 14, 1998	Socorro	LINEAR	·	12 km	MPC; JPL
15451	1998 XK_{42}	—	December 14, 1998	Socorro	LINEAR	EOS	11 km	MPC; JPL
15452 Ibramohammed	1998 XL_{52}	Ibramohammed	December 14, 1998	Socorro	LINEAR	·	4.9 km	MPC; JPL
15453 Brasileirinhos	1998 XD_{96}	Brasileirinhos	December 12, 1998	Mérida	Naranjo, O. A.	KOR	4.1 km	MPC; JPL
15454	1998 YB_{3}	—	December 17, 1998	Oizumi	T. Kobayashi	·	16 km	MPC; JPL
15455	1998 YJ_{3}	—	December 17, 1998	Oizumi	T. Kobayashi	·	2.4 km	MPC; JPL
15456	1998 YP_{3}	—	December 18, 1998	Kleť	Kleť	V	2.0 km	MPC; JPL
15457	1998 YN_{6}	—	December 18, 1998	Caussols	ODAS	·	19 km	MPC; JPL
15458	1998 YW_{9}	—	December 25, 1998	Višnjan Observatory	K. Korlević, M. Jurić	·	3.5 km	MPC; JPL
15459	1998 YY_{9}	—	December 25, 1998	Višnjan Observatory	K. Korlević, M. Jurić	·	4.5 km	MPC; JPL
15460 Manca	1998 YD_{10}	Manca	December 25, 1998	San Marcello	A. Boattini, L. Tesi	KOR	5.4 km	MPC; JPL
15461 Johnbird	1998 YT_{29}	Johnbird	December 27, 1998	Anderson Mesa	LONEOS	·	6.7 km	MPC; JPL
15462 Stumegan	1999 AV_{1}	Stumegan	January 8, 1999	Kitt Peak	Spacewatch	KOR	5.6 km	MPC; JPL
15463	1999 AT_{2}	—	January 9, 1999	Oizumi	T. Kobayashi	·	10 km	MPC; JPL
15464	1999 AN_{5}	—	January 12, 1999	Oizumi	T. Kobayashi	·	3.4 km	MPC; JPL
15465 Buchroeder	1999 AZ_{5}	Buchroeder	January 15, 1999	Kitt Peak	Spacewatch	·	7.3 km	MPC; JPL
15466 Barlow	1999 AR_{23}	Barlow	January 14, 1999	Anderson Mesa	LONEOS	EUN	5.6 km	MPC; JPL
15467 Aflorsch	1999 AN_{24}	Aflorsch	January 15, 1999	Caussols	ODAS	KOR	5.4 km	MPC; JPL
15468 Mondriaan	1999 AT_{31}	Mondriaan	January 14, 1999	Kitt Peak	Spacewatch	KOR	5.3 km	MPC; JPL
15469 Ohmura	1999 BC	Ohmura	January 16, 1999	Oizumi	T. Kobayashi	KOR	5.5 km	MPC; JPL
15470	1999 BS	—	January 16, 1999	Višnjan Observatory	K. Korlević	NYS ·	4.7 km	MPC; JPL
15471	1999 BE_{5}	—	January 19, 1999	High Point	D. K. Chesney	slow	5.9 km	MPC; JPL
15472	1999 BR_{5}	—	January 20, 1999	Višnjan Observatory	K. Korlević	THM	8.0 km	MPC; JPL
15473	1999 BL_{9}	—	January 23, 1999	Višnjan Observatory	K. Korlević	·	7.0 km	MPC; JPL
15474	1999 BG_{11}	—	January 20, 1999	Caussols	ODAS	·	5.9 km	MPC; JPL
15475	1999 BQ_{14}	—	January 24, 1999	Woomera	F. B. Zoltowski	·	3.0 km	MPC; JPL
15476 Narendra	1999 BW_{24}	Narendra	January 18, 1999	Socorro	LINEAR	V	2.5 km	MPC; JPL
15477	1999 CG_{1}	—	February 6, 1999	Oizumi	T. Kobayashi	·	8.5 km	MPC; JPL
15478	1999 CZ_{2}	—	February 7, 1999	San Marcello	L. Tesi, A. Boattini	·	11 km	MPC; JPL
15479	1999 CH_{9}	—	February 8, 1999	Uenohara	N. Kawasato	·	6.4 km	MPC; JPL
15480	1999 CB_{14}	—	February 12, 1999	Uenohara	N. Kawasato	EOS	8.7 km	MPC; JPL
15481	1999 CK_{19}	—	February 10, 1999	Socorro	LINEAR	·	4.7 km	MPC; JPL
15482	1999 CB_{21}	—	February 10, 1999	Socorro	LINEAR	THM	11 km	MPC; JPL
15483	1999 CW_{25}	—	February 10, 1999	Socorro	LINEAR	·	10 km	MPC; JPL
15484	1999 CU_{46}	—	February 10, 1999	Socorro	LINEAR	·	9.0 km	MPC; JPL
15485	1999 CY_{53}	—	February 10, 1999	Socorro	LINEAR	THM	10 km	MPC; JPL
15486	1999 CP_{62}	—	February 12, 1999	Socorro	LINEAR	·	4.7 km	MPC; JPL
15487	1999 CC_{63}	—	February 12, 1999	Socorro	LINEAR	HYG	11 km	MPC; JPL
15488	1999 CB_{75}	—	February 12, 1999	Socorro	LINEAR	·	18 km	MPC; JPL
15489	1999 CJ_{78}	—	February 12, 1999	Socorro	LINEAR	·	15 km	MPC; JPL
15490	1999 CJ_{81}	—	February 12, 1999	Socorro	LINEAR	(5)	4.0 km	MPC; JPL
15491	1999 CW_{85}	—	February 10, 1999	Socorro	LINEAR	·	4.9 km	MPC; JPL
15492 Nyberg	1999 CG_{89}	Nyberg	February 10, 1999	Socorro	LINEAR	NYS ·	7.3 km	MPC; JPL
15493	1999 CS_{105}	—	February 12, 1999	Socorro	LINEAR	·	9.8 km	MPC; JPL
15494 Lucylake	1999 CX_{123}	Lucylake	February 11, 1999	Socorro	LINEAR	·	11 km	MPC; JPL
15495 Bogie	1999 DF_{2}	Bogie	February 17, 1999	Reedy Creek	J. Broughton	·	6.2 km	MPC; JPL
15496	1999 DQ_{3}	—	February 20, 1999	Nachi-Katsuura	Y. Shimizu, T. Urata	EUN	6.2 km	MPC; JPL
15497 Lucca	1999 DE_{7}	Lucca	February 23, 1999	Monte Agliale	S. Donati	THM	7.4 km	MPC; JPL
15498	1999 EQ_{4}	—	March 13, 1999	Višnjan Observatory	K. Korlević	EOS	11 km	MPC; JPL
15499 Cloyd	1999 FY_{8}	Cloyd	March 19, 1999	Anderson Mesa	LONEOS	EOS	9.0 km	MPC; JPL
15500 Anantpatel	1999 FO_{26}	Anantpatel	March 19, 1999	Socorro	LINEAR	·	3.3 km	MPC; JPL

== 15501–15600 ==
back to top

Designation			Discovery			Properties		Ref
Permanent	Provisional	Named after	Date	Site	Discoverer(s)	Category	Diam.	Ref
15501 Pepawlowski	1999 NK_{10}	Pepawlowski	July 13, 1999	Socorro	LINEAR	KOR	4.2 km	MPC; JPL
15502 Hypeirochus	1999 NV_{27}	Hypeirochus	July 14, 1999	Socorro	LINEAR	L5	53 km	MPC; JPL
15503 Estradioto	1999 RD_{25}	Estradioto	September 7, 1999	Socorro	LINEAR	·	9.6 km	MPC; JPL
15504	1999 RG_{33}	—	September 4, 1999	Catalina	CSS	T_{j} (1.95) · damocloid · unusual	20 km	MPC; JPL
15505	1999 RF_{56}	—	September 7, 1999	Socorro	LINEAR	HIL · 3:2	25 km	MPC; JPL
15506 Preygel	1999 RX_{132}	Preygel	September 9, 1999	Socorro	LINEAR	·	2.3 km	MPC; JPL
15507 Rengarajan	1999 RC_{166}	Rengarajan	September 9, 1999	Socorro	LINEAR	slow	7.8 km	MPC; JPL
15508	1999 TE_{38}	—	October 1, 1999	Catalina	CSS	·	3.1 km	MPC; JPL
15509 Annejing	1999 TX_{113}	Annejing	October 4, 1999	Socorro	LINEAR	·	4.6 km	MPC; JPL
15510 Phoeberounds	1999 TF_{127}	Phoeberounds	October 4, 1999	Socorro	LINEAR	·	5.2 km	MPC; JPL
15511	1999 TD_{185}	—	October 12, 1999	Socorro	LINEAR	slow	5.8 km	MPC; JPL
15512 Snyder	1999 UK_{1}	Snyder	October 18, 1999	Junk Bond	J. Medkeff, D. Healy	·	20 km	MPC; JPL
15513 Emmermann	1999 UV_{38}	Emmermann	October 29, 1999	Anderson Mesa	LONEOS	·	3.3 km	MPC; JPL
15514	1999 VW_{24}	—	November 13, 1999	Oizumi	T. Kobayashi	·	25 km	MPC; JPL
15515	1999 VN_{80}	—	November 4, 1999	Socorro	LINEAR	·	10 km	MPC; JPL
15516 Langleben	1999 VN_{86}	Langleben	November 5, 1999	Socorro	LINEAR	EUN	5.0 km	MPC; JPL
15517	1999 VS_{113}	—	November 4, 1999	Catalina	CSS	DOR	9.4 km	MPC; JPL
15518	1999 VY_{153}	—	November 10, 1999	Catalina	CSS	DOR	11 km	MPC; JPL
15519	1999 XW	—	December 2, 1999	Oizumi	T. Kobayashi	·	16 km	MPC; JPL
15520	1999 XK_{98}	—	December 7, 1999	Socorro	LINEAR	EUN	8.6 km	MPC; JPL
15521	1999 XH_{133}	—	December 12, 1999	Socorro	LINEAR	L4	28 km	MPC; JPL
15522 Trueblood	1999 XX_{136}	Trueblood	December 14, 1999	Fountain Hills	C. W. Juels	·	4.1 km	MPC; JPL
15523 Grenville	1999 XE_{151}	Grenville	December 9, 1999	Anderson Mesa	LONEOS	GEF	4.9 km	MPC; JPL
15524	1999 XO_{175}	—	December 10, 1999	Socorro	LINEAR	·	7.6 km	MPC; JPL
15525	1999 XH_{176}	—	December 10, 1999	Socorro	LINEAR	·	6.8 km	MPC; JPL
15526 Kokura	1999 XH_{229}	Kokura	December 8, 1999	Anderson Mesa	LONEOS	·	6.0 km	MPC; JPL
15527	1999 YY_{2}	—	December 16, 1999	Socorro	LINEAR	L4	36 km	MPC; JPL
15528 Martinsmedina	2000 AJ_{10}	Martinsmedina	January 3, 2000	Socorro	LINEAR	·	2.3 km	MPC; JPL
15529	2000 AA_{80}	—	January 5, 2000	Socorro	LINEAR	L4 · slow	16 km	MPC; JPL
15530 Kuber	2000 AV_{98}	Kuber	January 5, 2000	Socorro	LINEAR	·	2.7 km	MPC; JPL
15531 Matusch	2000 AV_{99}	Matusch	January 5, 2000	Socorro	LINEAR	·	2.2 km	MPC; JPL
15532	2000 AP_{126}	—	January 5, 2000	Socorro	LINEAR	·	19 km	MPC; JPL
15533 Saturnino	2000 AP_{138}	Saturnino	January 5, 2000	Socorro	LINEAR	slow	3.9 km	MPC; JPL
15534	2000 AQ_{164}	—	January 5, 2000	Socorro	LINEAR	·	13 km	MPC; JPL
15535	2000 AT_{177}	—	January 7, 2000	Socorro	LINEAR	L4	40 km	MPC; JPL
15536	2000 AG_{191}	—	January 8, 2000	Socorro	LINEAR	L4	29 km	MPC; JPL
15537	2000 AM_{199}	—	January 9, 2000	Socorro	LINEAR	EOS	10 km	MPC; JPL
15538	2000 BW_{14}	—	January 31, 2000	Oizumi	T. Kobayashi	EOS	7.6 km	MPC; JPL
15539	2000 CN_{3}	—	February 2, 2000	Socorro	LINEAR	L4	42 km	MPC; JPL
15540	2000 CF_{18}	—	February 2, 2000	Socorro	LINEAR	T_{j} (2.97) · 3:2	20 km	MPC; JPL
15541	2000 CN_{63}	—	February 2, 2000	Socorro	LINEAR	·	13 km	MPC; JPL
15542	2000 DN_{3}	—	February 28, 2000	Višnjan Observatory	K. Korlević, M. Jurić	GEF	4.7 km	MPC; JPL
15543 Elizateel	2000 DD_{96}	Elizateel	February 29, 2000	Socorro	LINEAR	·	2.9 km	MPC; JPL
15544 Hushicheng	2000 EG_{17}	Hushicheng	March 3, 2000	Socorro	LINEAR	KOR	4.0 km	MPC; JPL
15545	2000 EK_{46}	—	March 9, 2000	Socorro	LINEAR	3:2 · SHU	16 km	MPC; JPL
15546 Sunyufeng	2000 EZ_{75}	Sunyufeng	March 5, 2000	Socorro	LINEAR	·	3.9 km	MPC; JPL
15547 Xujiping	2000 ET_{91}	Xujiping	March 9, 2000	Socorro	LINEAR	·	2.2 km	MPC; JPL
15548 Kalinowski	2000 EJ_{147}	Kalinowski	March 4, 2000	Catalina	CSS	·	2.6 km	MPC; JPL
15549	2000 FN	—	March 25, 2000	Oizumi	T. Kobayashi	·	4.5 km	MPC; JPL
15550 Sydney	2000 FR_{10}	Sydney	March 31, 2000	Reedy Creek	J. Broughton	EOS	7.7 km	MPC; JPL
15551 Paddock	2000 FQ_{25}	Paddock	March 27, 2000	Anderson Mesa	LONEOS	·	6.9 km	MPC; JPL
15552 Sandashounkan	2000 FO_{26}	Sandashounkan	March 27, 2000	Anderson Mesa	LONEOS	TIR	7.6 km	MPC; JPL
15553 Carachang	2000 FG_{45}	Carachang	March 29, 2000	Socorro	LINEAR	·	2.4 km	MPC; JPL
15554 Chenhuaipu	2000 FH_{46}	Chenhuaipu	March 29, 2000	Socorro	LINEAR	V	3.9 km	MPC; JPL
15555 Luochihi	2000 FD_{49}	Luochihi	March 30, 2000	Socorro	LINEAR	EOS	6.2 km	MPC; JPL
15556 Hanafy	2000 FW_{49}	Hanafy	March 30, 2000	Socorro	LINEAR	V	3.4 km	MPC; JPL
15557 Kimcochran	2000 GV	Kimcochran	April 2, 2000	Kitt Peak	Spacewatch	·	5.0 km	MPC; JPL
15558	2000 GR_{2}	—	April 3, 2000	Socorro	LINEAR	EUN	6.3 km	MPC; JPL
15559 Abigailhines	2000 GR_{23}	Abigailhines	April 5, 2000	Socorro	LINEAR	·	4.0 km	MPC; JPL
15560	2000 GR_{24}	—	April 5, 2000	Socorro	LINEAR	·	7.0 km	MPC; JPL
15561	2000 GU_{36}	—	April 5, 2000	Socorro	LINEAR	·	8.2 km	MPC; JPL
15562	2000 GF_{48}	—	April 5, 2000	Socorro	LINEAR	slow	30 km	MPC; JPL
15563 Remsberg	2000 GG_{48}	Remsberg	April 5, 2000	Socorro	LINEAR	NYS	3.7 km	MPC; JPL
15564 Lateef	2000 GU_{48}	Lateef	April 5, 2000	Socorro	LINEAR	KOR	5.3 km	MPC; JPL
15565 Benjaminsteele	2000 GM_{49}	Benjaminsteele	April 5, 2000	Socorro	LINEAR	·	3.7 km	MPC; JPL
15566 Elizabethbaker	2000 GD_{50}	Elizabethbaker	April 5, 2000	Socorro	LINEAR	·	2.0 km	MPC; JPL
15567 Giacomelli	2000 GF_{53}	Giacomelli	April 5, 2000	Socorro	LINEAR	·	6.2 km	MPC; JPL
15568 Jathe	2000 GP_{54}	Jathe	April 5, 2000	Socorro	LINEAR	KOR	5.4 km	MPC; JPL
15569 Feinberg	2000 GC_{60}	Feinberg	April 5, 2000	Socorro	LINEAR	·	2.4 km	MPC; JPL
15570 von Wolff	2000 GT_{60}	von Wolff	April 5, 2000	Socorro	LINEAR	·	8.2 km	MPC; JPL
15571	2000 GM_{61}	—	April 5, 2000	Socorro	LINEAR	·	7.8 km	MPC; JPL
15572	2000 GH_{65}	—	April 5, 2000	Socorro	LINEAR	THM	8.1 km	MPC; JPL
15573 Richardjoseph	2000 GX_{65}	Richardjoseph	April 5, 2000	Socorro	LINEAR	KOR	4.3 km	MPC; JPL
15574 Stephaniehass	2000 GF_{66}	Stephaniehass	April 5, 2000	Socorro	LINEAR	·	2.5 km	MPC; JPL
15575 Manyakumar	2000 GC_{68}	Manyakumar	April 5, 2000	Socorro	LINEAR	MRX	4.7 km	MPC; JPL
15576 Munday	2000 GK_{68}	Munday	April 5, 2000	Socorro	LINEAR	KOR	3.1 km	MPC; JPL
15577 Gywilliams	2000 GN_{68}	Gywilliams	April 5, 2000	Socorro	LINEAR	·	1.8 km	MPC; JPL
15578 Bagnall	2000 GW_{69}	Bagnall	April 5, 2000	Socorro	LINEAR	KOR	5.8 km	MPC; JPL
15579 Richardbeattie	2000 GP_{70}	Richardbeattie	April 5, 2000	Socorro	LINEAR	·	6.3 km	MPC; JPL
15580	2000 GE_{71}	—	April 5, 2000	Socorro	LINEAR	·	11 km	MPC; JPL
15581 Adamkelly	2000 GV_{72}	Adamkelly	April 5, 2000	Socorro	LINEAR	·	4.3 km	MPC; JPL
15582 Russellburrows	2000 GZ_{73}	Russellburrows	April 5, 2000	Socorro	LINEAR	·	4.6 km	MPC; JPL
15583 Hanick	2000 GM_{74}	Hanick	April 5, 2000	Socorro	LINEAR	·	4.2 km	MPC; JPL
15584 Yumaokamoto	2000 GO_{74}	Yumaokamoto	April 5, 2000	Socorro	LINEAR	·	7.1 km	MPC; JPL
15585	2000 GR_{74}	—	April 5, 2000	Socorro	LINEAR	·	3.8 km	MPC; JPL
15586	2000 GV_{75}	—	April 5, 2000	Socorro	LINEAR	·	6.7 km	MPC; JPL
15587 Sotsukamoto	2000 GK_{76}	Sotsukamoto	April 5, 2000	Socorro	LINEAR	·	3.6 km	MPC; JPL
15588	2000 GO_{79}	—	April 5, 2000	Socorro	LINEAR	THM	8.4 km	MPC; JPL
15589	2000 GB_{80}	—	April 6, 2000	Socorro	LINEAR	EOS	9.1 km	MPC; JPL
15590	2000 GH_{82}	—	April 7, 2000	Višnjan Observatory	K. Korlević	EUN	7.3 km	MPC; JPL
15591	2000 GP_{89}	—	April 4, 2000	Socorro	LINEAR	·	7.7 km	MPC; JPL
15592	2000 GJ_{91}	—	April 4, 2000	Socorro	LINEAR	·	6.7 km	MPC; JPL
15593	2000 GR_{93}	—	April 5, 2000	Socorro	LINEAR	·	8.7 km	MPC; JPL
15594 Castillo	2000 GG_{95}	Castillo	April 6, 2000	Socorro	LINEAR	·	4.0 km	MPC; JPL
15595 Melwincheng	2000 GX_{95}	Melwincheng	April 6, 2000	Socorro	LINEAR	·	5.0 km	MPC; JPL
15596 Yongshiangtham	2000 GZ_{95}	Yongshiangtham	April 6, 2000	Socorro	LINEAR	NYS	5.0 km	MPC; JPL
15597 Piotrlazarek	2000 GM_{96}	Piotrlazarek	April 6, 2000	Socorro	LINEAR	KOR	5.4 km	MPC; JPL
15598 Kazantsev	2000 GP_{96}	Kazantsev	April 6, 2000	Socorro	LINEAR	·	7.5 km	MPC; JPL
15599 Richardlarson	2000 GF_{99}	Richardlarson	April 7, 2000	Socorro	LINEAR	·	4.4 km	MPC; JPL
15600	2000 GY_{103}	—	April 7, 2000	Socorro	LINEAR	EOS	8.3 km	MPC; JPL

== 15601–15700 ==
back to top

Designation			Discovery			Properties		Ref
Permanent	Provisional	Named after	Date	Site	Discoverer(s)	Category	Diam.	Ref
15601	2000 GZ_{106}	—	April 7, 2000	Socorro	LINEAR	·	12 km	MPC; JPL
15602	2000 GA_{108}	—	April 7, 2000	Socorro	LINEAR	HOF	13 km	MPC; JPL
15603 Kimyoonji	2000 GG_{108}	Kimyoonji	April 7, 2000	Socorro	LINEAR	fast	6.4 km	MPC; JPL
15604 Fruits	2000 GT_{108}	Fruits	April 7, 2000	Socorro	LINEAR	·	3.3 km	MPC; JPL
15605	2000 GY_{114}	—	April 7, 2000	Socorro	LINEAR	EUN	7.1 km	MPC; JPL
15606 Winer	2000 GU_{122}	Winer	April 11, 2000	Fountain Hills	C. W. Juels	·	3.8 km	MPC; JPL
15607	2000 GA_{124}	—	April 7, 2000	Socorro	LINEAR	·	8.7 km	MPC; JPL
15608 Owens	2000 GK_{124}	Owens	April 7, 2000	Socorro	LINEAR	V	2.7 km	MPC; JPL
15609 Kosmaczewski	2000 GP_{124}	Kosmaczewski	April 7, 2000	Socorro	LINEAR	·	4.7 km	MPC; JPL
15610	2000 GY_{126}	—	April 7, 2000	Socorro	LINEAR	·	5.8 km	MPC; JPL
15611 Leejoonyoung	2000 GD_{127}	Leejoonyoung	April 7, 2000	Socorro	LINEAR	·	11 km	MPC; JPL
15612 Parkmincheol	2000 GV_{133}	Parkmincheol	April 7, 2000	Socorro	LINEAR	EOS	5.3 km	MPC; JPL
15613 Rajihyun	2000 GH_{136}	Rajihyun	April 12, 2000	Socorro	LINEAR	EUN	6.0 km	MPC; JPL
15614 Pillinger	2000 GA_{143}	Pillinger	April 7, 2000	Anderson Mesa	LONEOS	EOS	7.0 km	MPC; JPL
15615	2000 HU_{1}	—	April 25, 2000	Višnjan Observatory	K. Korlević	3:2 · SHU	22 km	MPC; JPL
15616	2000 HG_{10}	—	April 27, 2000	Socorro	LINEAR	THM	10 km	MPC; JPL
15617 Fallowfield	2000 HK_{10}	Fallowfield	April 27, 2000	Socorro	LINEAR	·	2.8 km	MPC; JPL
15618 Lorifritz	2000 HF_{11}	Lorifritz	April 27, 2000	Socorro	LINEAR	·	1.6 km	MPC; JPL
15619 Albertwu	2000 HE_{13}	Albertwu	April 28, 2000	Socorro	LINEAR	·	4.8 km	MPC; JPL
15620 Beltrami	2000 HQ_{14}	Beltrami	April 29, 2000	Prescott	P. G. Comba	NYS	3.6 km	MPC; JPL
15621 Erikhovland	2000 HO_{20}	Erikhovland	April 29, 2000	Haleakala	NEAT	·	10 km	MPC; JPL
15622 Westrich	2000 HY_{20}	Westrich	April 27, 2000	Socorro	LINEAR	·	2.4 km	MPC; JPL
15623 Maitaneam	2000 HU_{30}	Maitaneam	April 28, 2000	Socorro	LINEAR	·	3.4 km	MPC; JPL
15624 Lamberton	2000 HB_{31}	Lamberton	April 28, 2000	Socorro	LINEAR	·	3.6 km	MPC; JPL
15625 Agrawal	2000 HB_{35}	Agrawal	April 27, 2000	Socorro	LINEAR	MAR	3.7 km	MPC; JPL
15626	2000 HR_{50}	—	April 29, 2000	Socorro	LINEAR	3:2	19 km	MPC; JPL
15627 Hong	2000 HW_{52}	Hong	April 29, 2000	Socorro	LINEAR	·	4.8 km	MPC; JPL
15628 Gonzales	2000 HA_{53}	Gonzales	April 29, 2000	Socorro	LINEAR	·	2.3 km	MPC; JPL
15629 Sriner	2000 HK_{53}	Sriner	April 29, 2000	Socorro	LINEAR	·	6.0 km	MPC; JPL
15630 Disanti	2000 HT_{56}	Disanti	April 24, 2000	Anderson Mesa	LONEOS	·	3.5 km	MPC; JPL
15631 Dellorusso	2000 HT_{57}	Dellorusso	April 24, 2000	Anderson Mesa	LONEOS	EOS	9.3 km	MPC; JPL
15632 Magee-Sauer	2000 HU_{70}	Magee-Sauer	April 26, 2000	Anderson Mesa	LONEOS	·	2.8 km	MPC; JPL
15633	2000 JZ_{1}	—	May 2, 2000	Socorro	LINEAR	PHO	4.5 km	MPC; JPL
15634 Ahluwalia	2000 JD_{15}	Ahluwalia	May 6, 2000	Socorro	LINEAR	V	4.5 km	MPC; JPL
15635 Andrewhager	2000 JV_{27}	Andrewhager	May 7, 2000	Socorro	LINEAR	·	8.1 km	MPC; JPL
15636	2000 JD_{31}	—	May 7, 2000	Socorro	LINEAR	·	15 km	MPC; JPL
15637	2000 JY_{53}	—	May 6, 2000	Socorro	LINEAR	URS	18 km	MPC; JPL
15638	2000 JA_{65}	—	May 5, 2000	Socorro	LINEAR	HIL · 3:2	32 km	MPC; JPL
15639	2074 P-L	—	September 24, 1960	Palomar	C. J. van Houten, I. van Houten-Groeneveld, T. Gehrels	·	2.4 km	MPC; JPL
15640	2632 P-L	—	September 24, 1960	Palomar	C. J. van Houten, I. van Houten-Groeneveld, T. Gehrels	·	6.9 km	MPC; JPL
15641	2668 P-L	—	September 24, 1960	Palomar	C. J. van Houten, I. van Houten-Groeneveld, T. Gehrels	·	2.9 km	MPC; JPL
15642	2679 P-L	—	September 24, 1960	Palomar	C. J. van Houten, I. van Houten-Groeneveld, T. Gehrels	·	1.7 km	MPC; JPL
15643	3540 P-L	—	October 17, 1960	Palomar	C. J. van Houten, I. van Houten-Groeneveld, T. Gehrels	GEF	5.5 km	MPC; JPL
15644	4157 P-L	—	September 24, 1960	Palomar	C. J. van Houten, I. van Houten-Groeneveld, T. Gehrels	·	5.4 km	MPC; JPL
15645	4163 P-L	—	September 24, 1960	Palomar	C. J. van Houten, I. van Houten-Groeneveld, T. Gehrels	·	4.0 km	MPC; JPL
15646	4555 P-L	—	September 24, 1960	Palomar	C. J. van Houten, I. van Houten-Groeneveld, T. Gehrels	NYS	3.6 km	MPC; JPL
15647	4556 P-L	—	September 24, 1960	Palomar	C. J. van Houten, I. van Houten-Groeneveld, T. Gehrels	·	4.8 km	MPC; JPL
15648	6115 P-L	—	September 24, 1960	Palomar	C. J. van Houten, I. van Houten-Groeneveld, T. Gehrels	·	2.2 km	MPC; JPL
15649	6317 P-L	—	September 24, 1960	Palomar	C. J. van Houten, I. van Houten-Groeneveld, T. Gehrels	KOR	3.9 km	MPC; JPL
15650	6725 P-L	—	September 24, 1960	Palomar	C. J. van Houten, I. van Houten-Groeneveld, T. Gehrels	·	7.5 km	MPC; JPL
15651 Tlepolemos	9612 P-L	Tlepolemos	October 22, 1960	Palomar	C. J. van Houten, I. van Houten-Groeneveld, T. Gehrels	L4	24 km	MPC; JPL
15652	1048 T-1	—	March 25, 1971	Palomar	C. J. van Houten, I. van Houten-Groeneveld, T. Gehrels	·	16 km	MPC; JPL
15653	1080 T-1	—	March 25, 1971	Palomar	C. J. van Houten, I. van Houten-Groeneveld, T. Gehrels	·	3.5 km	MPC; JPL
15654	1176 T-1	—	March 25, 1971	Palomar	C. J. van Houten, I. van Houten-Groeneveld, T. Gehrels	·	13 km	MPC; JPL
15655	2209 T-1	—	March 25, 1971	Palomar	C. J. van Houten, I. van Houten-Groeneveld, T. Gehrels	THM	9.9 km	MPC; JPL
15656	3277 T-1	—	March 26, 1971	Palomar	C. J. van Houten, I. van Houten-Groeneveld, T. Gehrels	THM	10 km	MPC; JPL
15657	1125 T-2	—	September 29, 1973	Palomar	C. J. van Houten, I. van Houten-Groeneveld, T. Gehrels	THM	5.6 km	MPC; JPL
15658	1265 T-2	—	September 29, 1973	Palomar	C. J. van Houten, I. van Houten-Groeneveld, T. Gehrels	slow	3.2 km	MPC; JPL
15659	2141 T-2	—	September 29, 1973	Palomar	C. J. van Houten, I. van Houten-Groeneveld, T. Gehrels	slow	13 km	MPC; JPL
15660	3025 T-2	—	September 30, 1973	Palomar	C. J. van Houten, I. van Houten-Groeneveld, T. Gehrels	·	2.4 km	MPC; JPL
15661	3281 T-2	—	September 30, 1973	Palomar	C. J. van Houten, I. van Houten-Groeneveld, T. Gehrels	·	2.3 km	MPC; JPL
15662	4064 T-2	—	September 29, 1973	Palomar	C. J. van Houten, I. van Houten-Groeneveld, T. Gehrels	·	2.4 km	MPC; JPL
15663 Periphas	4168 T-2	Periphas	September 29, 1973	Palomar	C. J. van Houten, I. van Houten-Groeneveld, T. Gehrels	L4	36 km	MPC; JPL
15664	4050 T-3	—	October 16, 1977	Palomar	C. J. van Houten, I. van Houten-Groeneveld, T. Gehrels	(5)	3.9 km	MPC; JPL
15665	4094 T-3	—	October 16, 1977	Palomar	C. J. van Houten, I. van Houten-Groeneveld, T. Gehrels	·	3.3 km	MPC; JPL
15666	5021 T-3	—	October 16, 1977	Palomar	C. J. van Houten, I. van Houten-Groeneveld, T. Gehrels	KON	4.9 km	MPC; JPL
15667	5046 T-3	—	October 16, 1977	Palomar	C. J. van Houten, I. van Houten-Groeneveld, T. Gehrels	·	2.2 km	MPC; JPL
15668	5138 T-3	—	October 16, 1977	Palomar	C. J. van Houten, I. van Houten-Groeneveld, T. Gehrels	·	3.8 km	MPC; JPL
15669 Pshenichner	1974 ST_{1}	Pshenichner	September 19, 1974	Nauchnij	L. I. Chernykh	·	3.3 km	MPC; JPL
15670	1975 SO_{1}	—	September 30, 1975	Palomar	S. J. Bus	·	7.1 km	MPC; JPL
15671 Suzannedébarbat	1977 EP_{6}	Suzannedébarbat	March 12, 1977	Kiso	H. Kosai, K. Furukawa	3:2	17 km	MPC; JPL
15672 Sato-Norio	1977 EX_{7}	Sato-Norio	March 12, 1977	Kiso	H. Kosai, K. Furukawa	NYS	4.2 km	MPC; JPL
15673 Chetaev	1978 PV_{2}	Chetaev	August 8, 1978	Nauchnij	N. S. Chernykh	slow	3.0 km	MPC; JPL
15674 Elfving	1978 RR_{7}	Elfving	September 2, 1978	La Silla	C.-I. Lagerkvist	V	2.5 km	MPC; JPL
15675 Goloseevo	1978 SP_{5}	Goloseevo	September 27, 1978	Nauchnij	L. I. Chernykh	AGN ·	12 km	MPC; JPL
15676 Almoisheev	1978 TQ_{5}	Almoisheev	October 8, 1978	Nauchnij	L. I. Chernykh	·	10 km	MPC; JPL
15677	1980 TZ_{5}	—	October 14, 1980	Nanking	Purple Mountain	·	10 km	MPC; JPL
15678	1981 DM	—	February 28, 1981	Siding Spring	S. J. Bus	·	4.2 km	MPC; JPL
15679	1981 DA_{1}	—	February 28, 1981	Siding Spring	S. J. Bus	·	8.1 km	MPC; JPL
15680	1981 EV_{7}	—	March 1, 1981	Siding Spring	S. J. Bus	PAD	6.5 km	MPC; JPL
15681	1981 ES_{17}	—	March 2, 1981	Siding Spring	S. J. Bus	·	5.7 km	MPC; JPL
15682	1981 EB_{25}	—	March 2, 1981	Siding Spring	S. J. Bus	·	6.6 km	MPC; JPL
15683	1981 EX_{25}	—	March 2, 1981	Siding Spring	S. J. Bus	·	3.0 km	MPC; JPL
15684	1981 ED_{28}	—	March 2, 1981	Siding Spring	S. J. Bus	·	5.9 km	MPC; JPL
15685	1981 EU_{33}	—	March 1, 1981	Siding Spring	S. J. Bus	V	2.0 km	MPC; JPL
15686	1981 EW_{33}	—	March 1, 1981	Siding Spring	S. J. Bus	·	4.5 km	MPC; JPL
15687	1981 ES_{38}	—	March 1, 1981	Siding Spring	S. J. Bus	·	4.3 km	MPC; JPL
15688	1981 UW_{23}	—	October 24, 1981	Palomar	S. J. Bus	EUN	7.5 km	MPC; JPL
15689	1981 UP_{25}	—	October 25, 1981	Palomar	S. J. Bus	·	7.2 km	MPC; JPL
15690	1982 JD_{3}	—	May 15, 1982	Palomar	Palomar	V	3.0 km	MPC; JPL
15691 Maslov	1982 TF_{1}	Maslov	October 14, 1982	Nauchnij	L. G. Karachkina	·	3.8 km	MPC; JPL
15692	1984 RA	—	September 1, 1984	Palomar	M. A. Barucci	H	1.7 km	MPC; JPL
15693	1984 SN_{6}	—	September 23, 1984	La Silla	H. Debehogne	·	7.7 km	MPC; JPL
15694	1985 RR_{3}	—	September 7, 1985	La Silla	H. Debehogne	EOS · slow	8.0 km	MPC; JPL
15695 Fedorshpig	1985 RJ_{5}	Fedorshpig	September 11, 1985	Nauchnij	N. S. Chernykh	·	3.8 km	MPC; JPL
15696	1986 QG_{1}	—	August 26, 1986	La Silla	H. Debehogne	·	3.0 km	MPC; JPL
15697	1986 QO_{1}	—	August 27, 1986	La Silla	H. Debehogne	·	4.9 km	MPC; JPL
15698	1986 QO_{2}	—	August 28, 1986	La Silla	H. Debehogne	THM	11 km	MPC; JPL
15699 Lyytinen	1986 VM_{6}	Lyytinen	November 6, 1986	Anderson Mesa	E. Bowell	·	2.8 km	MPC; JPL
15700	1987 QD	—	August 24, 1987	Palomar	S. Singer-Brewster	moon	3.0 km	MPC; JPL

== 15701–15800 ==
back to top

Designation			Discovery			Properties		Ref
Permanent	Provisional	Named after	Date	Site	Discoverer(s)	Category	Diam.	Ref
15701	1987 RG_{1}	—	September 13, 1987	La Silla	H. Debehogne	slow	8.0 km	MPC; JPL
15702 Olegkotov	1987 RN_{3}	Olegkotov	September 2, 1987	Nauchnij	L. I. Chernykh	·	7.6 km	MPC; JPL
15703 Yrjölä	1987 SU_{1}	Yrjölä	September 21, 1987	Anderson Mesa	E. Bowell	·	2.8 km	MPC; JPL
15704	1987 SE_{7}	—	September 20, 1987	Palomar	J. Alu, E. F. Helin	slow	3.0 km	MPC; JPL
15705 Hautot	1988 AH_{5}	Hautot	January 14, 1988	La Silla	H. Debehogne	·	4.8 km	MPC; JPL
15706	1988 CE_{2}	—	February 11, 1988	La Silla	E. W. Elst	·	3.1 km	MPC; JPL
15707	1988 RN_{4}	—	September 1, 1988	La Silla	H. Debehogne	·	11 km	MPC; JPL
15708 Metsoc	1988 RB_{12}	Metsoc	September 14, 1988	Cerro Tololo	S. J. Bus	·	5.1 km	MPC; JPL
15709	1988 XH_{1}	—	December 7, 1988	Kushiro	S. Ueda, H. Kaneda	EUN	8.2 km	MPC; JPL
15710 Böcklin	1989 AV_{6}	Böcklin	January 11, 1989	Tautenburg Observatory	F. Börngen	·	4.8 km	MPC; JPL
15711	1989 GZ_{1}	—	April 3, 1989	La Silla	E. W. Elst	·	2.5 km	MPC; JPL
15712	1989 RN_{2}	—	September 1, 1989	Lake Tekapo	A. C. Gilmore, P. M. Kilmartin	·	17 km	MPC; JPL
15713	1989 SM_{4}	—	September 26, 1989	La Silla	E. W. Elst	·	8.1 km	MPC; JPL
15714	1989 TL_{15}	—	October 3, 1989	La Silla	H. Debehogne	·	4.1 km	MPC; JPL
15715 Osuginaoki	1989 UN_{1}	Osuginaoki	October 28, 1989	Kani	Y. Mizuno, T. Furuta	·	3.6 km	MPC; JPL
15716 Narahara	1989 WY_{1}	Narahara	November 29, 1989	Kitami	A. Takahashi, K. Watanabe	·	5.7 km	MPC; JPL
15717	1990 BL_{1}	—	January 21, 1990	Palomar	E. F. Helin	EUN	7.0 km	MPC; JPL
15718 Imokawa	1990 BB_{2}	Imokawa	January 30, 1990	Kushiro	Matsuyama, M., K. Watanabe	·	5.5 km	MPC; JPL
15719	1990 CF	—	February 1, 1990	Dynic	A. Sugie	EUN	6.4 km	MPC; JPL
15720	1990 EN_{1}	—	March 2, 1990	La Silla	E. W. Elst	DOR · fast	11 km	MPC; JPL
15721	1990 OV	—	July 19, 1990	Palomar	E. F. Helin	·	2.7 km	MPC; JPL
15722	1990 QV_{2}	—	August 24, 1990	Palomar	H. E. Holt	EOS	7.9 km	MPC; JPL
15723 Girraween	1990 SA_{2}	Girraween	September 20, 1990	Geisei	T. Seki	·	4.1 km	MPC; JPL
15724 Zille	1990 TW_{3}	Zille	October 12, 1990	Tautenburg Observatory	F. Börngen, L. D. Schmadel	·	3.7 km	MPC; JPL
15725	1990 TX_{4}	—	October 9, 1990	Siding Spring	R. H. McNaught	·	12 km	MPC; JPL
15726	1990 TG_{5}	—	October 9, 1990	Siding Spring	R. H. McNaught	·	3.2 km	MPC; JPL
15727 Ianmorison	1990 TO_{9}	Ianmorison	October 10, 1990	Tautenburg Observatory	L. D. Schmadel, F. Börngen	·	2.4 km	MPC; JPL
15728 Karlmay	1990 TG_{11}	Karlmay	October 11, 1990	Tautenburg Observatory	F. Börngen, L. D. Schmadel	·	2.1 km	MPC; JPL
15729 Yumikoitahana	1990 UB	Yumikoitahana	October 16, 1990	Kitami	A. Takahashi, K. Watanabe	·	6.2 km	MPC; JPL
15730	1990 UA_{1}	—	October 20, 1990	Dynic	A. Sugie	EUN	8.4 km	MPC; JPL
15731	1990 UW_{2}	—	October 16, 1990	Harvard Observatory	Oak Ridge Observatory	HYG	12 km	MPC; JPL
15732 Vitusbering	1990 VZ_{5}	Vitusbering	November 15, 1990	La Silla	E. W. Elst	VER	15 km	MPC; JPL
15733	1990 VB_{6}	—	November 15, 1990	La Silla	E. W. Elst	V	3.6 km	MPC; JPL
15734	1990 WV_{1}	—	November 18, 1990	La Silla	E. W. Elst	·	2.4 km	MPC; JPL
15735 Andakerkhoven	1990 WF_{2}	Andakerkhoven	November 18, 1990	La Silla	E. W. Elst	VER	12 km	MPC; JPL
15736 Hamanasu	1990 XN	Hamanasu	December 8, 1990	Kitami	K. Endate, K. Watanabe	·	7.8 km	MPC; JPL
15737	1991 CL	—	February 5, 1991	Yorii	M. Arai, H. Mori	·	7.9 km	MPC; JPL
15738	1991 DP	—	February 21, 1991	Karasuyama	S. Inoda, T. Urata	EOS	8.8 km	MPC; JPL
15739 Matsukuma	1991 ER	Matsukuma	March 9, 1991	Geisei	T. Seki	·	5.1 km	MPC; JPL
15740 Hyakumangoku	1991 EG_{1}	Hyakumangoku	March 15, 1991	Kitami	K. Endate, K. Watanabe	·	7.4 km	MPC; JPL
15741	1991 GZ_{6}	—	April 8, 1991	La Silla	E. W. Elst	·	2.5 km	MPC; JPL
15742 Laurabassi	1991 LB_{4}	Laurabassi	June 6, 1991	La Silla	E. W. Elst	·	4.9 km	MPC; JPL
15743	1991 ND_{7}	—	July 12, 1991	La Silla	H. Debehogne	·	6.7 km	MPC; JPL
15744	1991 PU	—	August 5, 1991	Palomar	H. E. Holt	·	9.9 km	MPC; JPL
15745 Yuliya	1991 PM_{5}	Yuliya	August 3, 1991	La Silla	E. W. Elst	AMO +1km · moon	1.2 km	MPC; JPL
15746	1991 PN_{8}	—	August 5, 1991	Palomar	H. E. Holt	·	6.5 km	MPC; JPL
15747	1991 RW_{23}	—	September 11, 1991	Palomar	H. E. Holt	HOF	12 km	MPC; JPL
15748	1991 RG_{25}	—	September 11, 1991	Palomar	H. E. Holt	DOR	15 km	MPC; JPL
15749	1991 VT_{1}	—	November 5, 1991	Ojima	Natori, A., T. Urata	·	4.4 km	MPC; JPL
15750	1991 VJ_{4}	—	November 9, 1991	Dynic	A. Sugie	V	6.2 km	MPC; JPL
15751	1991 VN_{4}	—	November 10, 1991	Kiyosato	S. Otomo	EOS	13 km	MPC; JPL
15752 Eluard	1992 BD_{2}	Eluard	January 30, 1992	La Silla	E. W. Elst	LIX	15 km	MPC; JPL
15753 Rathsman	1992 DD_{10}	Rathsman	February 29, 1992	La Silla	UESAC	HYG	10 km	MPC; JPL
15754	1992 EP	—	March 7, 1992	Kushiro	S. Ueda, H. Kaneda	ERI	9.2 km	MPC; JPL
15755	1992 ET_{5}	—	March 2, 1992	La Silla	UESAC	HYG	8.4 km	MPC; JPL
15756	1992 ET_{9}	—	March 2, 1992	La Silla	UESAC	·	3.2 km	MPC; JPL
15757	1992 EJ_{13}	—	March 2, 1992	La Silla	UESAC	·	3.1 km	MPC; JPL
15758	1992 FT_{1}	—	March 30, 1992	Kiyosato	S. Otomo	ERI	9.4 km	MPC; JPL
15759	1992 GM_{4}	—	April 4, 1992	La Silla	E. W. Elst	V	3.6 km	MPC; JPL
15760 Albion	1992 QB_{1}	Albion	August 30, 1992	Mauna Kea	D. C. Jewitt, J. X. Luu	cubewano (cold)	125 km	MPC; JPL
15761 Schumi	1992 SM_{16}	Schumi	September 24, 1992	Tautenburg Observatory	L. D. Schmadel, F. Börngen	·	8.7 km	MPC; JPL
15762 Rühmann	1992 SR_{24}	Rühmann	September 21, 1992	Tautenburg Observatory	F. Börngen	(5)	4.1 km	MPC; JPL
15763 Nagakubo	1992 UO_{5}	Nagakubo	October 26, 1992	Kitami	K. Endate, K. Watanabe	·	12 km	MPC; JPL
15764	1992 UL_{8}	—	October 31, 1992	Yatsugatake	Y. Kushida, O. Muramatsu	·	5.7 km	MPC; JPL
15765	1992 WU_{1}	—	November 18, 1992	Dynic	A. Sugie	·	4.2 km	MPC; JPL
15766 Strahlenberg	1993 BD_{13}	Strahlenberg	January 22, 1993	La Silla	E. W. Elst	·	14 km	MPC; JPL
15767	1993 FN_{7}	—	March 17, 1993	La Silla	UESAC	·	12 km	MPC; JPL
15768	1993 FW_{11}	—	March 17, 1993	La Silla	UESAC	·	3.9 km	MPC; JPL
15769	1993 FP_{23}	—	March 21, 1993	La Silla	UESAC	NYS	5.7 km	MPC; JPL
15770	1993 FL_{29}	—	March 21, 1993	La Silla	UESAC	HYG	8.7 km	MPC; JPL
15771	1993 FS_{34}	—	March 19, 1993	La Silla	UESAC	THM	10 km	MPC; JPL
15772	1993 FW_{34}	—	March 19, 1993	La Silla	UESAC	THM	8.8 km	MPC; JPL
15773	1993 FO_{37}	—	March 19, 1993	La Silla	UESAC	·	6.3 km	MPC; JPL
15774	1993 FK_{38}	—	March 19, 1993	La Silla	UESAC	·	7.2 km	MPC; JPL
15775	1993 FA_{49}	—	March 19, 1993	La Silla	UESAC	·	2.8 km	MPC; JPL
15776	1993 KO	—	May 20, 1993	Kiyosato	S. Otomo	·	4.5 km	MPC; JPL
15777	1993 LF	—	June 14, 1993	Palomar	H. E. Holt	MAR	9.9 km	MPC; JPL
15778	1993 NH	—	July 15, 1993	Palomar	E. F. Helin	slow	2.9 km	MPC; JPL
15779 Scottroberts	1993 OA_{3}	Scottroberts	July 26, 1993	Palomar	C. S. Shoemaker, D. H. Levy	PHO	5.7 km	MPC; JPL
15780	1993 OO_{3}	—	July 20, 1993	La Silla	E. W. Elst	NYS	3.4 km	MPC; JPL
15781	1993 OJ_{7}	—	July 20, 1993	La Silla	E. W. Elst	V	3.1 km	MPC; JPL
15782	1993 ON_{8}	—	July 20, 1993	La Silla	E. W. Elst	·	2.5 km	MPC; JPL
15783 Briancox	1993 PZ_{2}	Briancox	August 14, 1993	Caussols	E. W. Elst	3:2	20 km	MPC; JPL
15784	1993 QZ	—	August 20, 1993	Palomar	E. F. Helin	PHO	4.2 km	MPC; JPL
15785 de Villegas	1993 QO_{3}	de Villegas	August 18, 1993	Caussols	E. W. Elst	·	13 km	MPC; JPL
15786 Hoshioka	1993 RS	Hoshioka	September 15, 1993	Kitami	K. Endate, K. Watanabe	H	3.8 km	MPC; JPL
15787	1993 RY_{7}	—	September 15, 1993	La Silla	E. W. Elst	·	3.7 km	MPC; JPL
15788	1993 SB	—	September 16, 1993	La Palma	Williams, I. P., A. Fitzsimmons, O'Ceallaigh, D.	plutino	125 km	MPC; JPL
15789	1993 SC	—	September 17, 1993	La Palma	Williams, I. P., A. Fitzsimmons, O'Ceallaigh, D.	plutino	328 km	MPC; JPL
15790 Keizan	1993 TC	Keizan	October 8, 1993	Kagoshima	M. Mukai, Takeishi, M.	·	5.6 km	MPC; JPL
15791 Yoshiewatanabe	1993 TM_{1}	Yoshiewatanabe	October 15, 1993	Kitami	K. Endate, K. Watanabe	NYS	3.3 km	MPC; JPL
15792	1993 TS_{15}	—	October 9, 1993	La Silla	E. W. Elst	·	4.8 km	MPC; JPL
15793	1993 TG_{19}	—	October 9, 1993	La Silla	E. W. Elst	·	3.5 km	MPC; JPL
15794	1993 TG_{31}	—	October 9, 1993	La Silla	E. W. Elst	NYS ·	6.9 km	MPC; JPL
15795	1993 TY_{38}	—	October 9, 1993	La Silla	E. W. Elst	·	7.5 km	MPC; JPL
15796	1993 TZ_{38}	—	October 9, 1993	La Silla	E. W. Elst	V	4.3 km	MPC; JPL
15797 Tachikoutenkibu	1993 UD_{3}	Tachikoutenkibu	October 22, 1993	Nyukasa	M. Hirasawa, S. Suzuki	V	4.1 km	MPC; JPL
15798	1993 VZ_{4}	—	November 14, 1993	Nyukasa	M. Hirasawa, S. Suzuki	MAS	3.6 km	MPC; JPL
15799	1993 XN	—	December 8, 1993	Oizumi	T. Kobayashi	EUN	8.1 km	MPC; JPL
15800	1993 XP	—	December 8, 1993	Oizumi	T. Kobayashi	EUN	5.9 km	MPC; JPL

== 15801–15900 ==
back to top

Designation			Discovery			Properties		Ref
Permanent	Provisional	Named after	Date	Site	Discoverer(s)	Category	Diam.	Ref
15801	1994 AF	—	January 2, 1994	Oizumi	T. Kobayashi	·	3.1 km	MPC; JPL
15802	1994 AT_{2}	—	January 14, 1994	Oizumi	T. Kobayashi	·	3.9 km	MPC; JPL
15803 Parisi	1994 CW	Parisi	February 7, 1994	Farra d'Isonzo	Farra d'Isonzo	EUN	5.8 km	MPC; JPL
15804 Yenisei	1994 EY_{5}	Yenisei	March 9, 1994	Caussols	E. W. Elst	PAD	10 km	MPC; JPL
15805 Murakamitakehiko	1994 GB_{1}	Murakamitakehiko	April 8, 1994	Kitami	K. Endate, K. Watanabe	·	5.0 km	MPC; JPL
15806 Kohei	1994 GN_{1}	Kohei	April 15, 1994	Kitami	K. Endate, K. Watanabe	slow	9.7 km	MPC; JPL
15807	1994 GV_{9}	—	April 15, 1994	Mauna Kea	D. C. Jewitt, J. Chen	cubewano (cold)	117 km	MPC; JPL
15808 Zelter	1994 GF_{10}	Zelter	April 3, 1994	Tautenburg Observatory	F. Börngen	·	5.5 km	MPC; JPL
15809	1994 JS	—	May 11, 1994	Cerro Tololo	D. C. Jewitt, J. X. Luu	res · 3:5	111 km	MPC; JPL
15810 Arawn	1994 JR_{1}	Arawn	May 12, 1994	La Palma	M. J. Irwin, A. Żytkow	plutino	142 km	MPC; JPL
15811 Nüsslein-Volhard	1994 ND_{1}	Nüsslein-Volhard	July 10, 1994	Tautenburg Observatory	F. Börngen	·	16 km	MPC; JPL
15812	1994 PZ	—	August 14, 1994	Oizumi	T. Kobayashi	·	4.3 km	MPC; JPL
15813	1994 PL_{12}	—	August 10, 1994	La Silla	E. W. Elst	NYS	4.5 km	MPC; JPL
15814	1994 PX_{12}	—	August 10, 1994	La Silla	E. W. Elst	·	2.7 km	MPC; JPL
15815	1994 PY_{18}	—	August 12, 1994	La Silla	E. W. Elst	·	4.8 km	MPC; JPL
15816	1994 PV_{39}	—	August 10, 1994	La Silla	E. W. Elst	NYS	4.2 km	MPC; JPL
15817 Lucianotesi	1994 QC	Lucianotesi	August 28, 1994	San Marcello	A. Boattini, M. Tombelli	AMO	720 m	MPC; JPL
15818 DeVeny	1994 RO_{7}	DeVeny	September 12, 1994	Kitt Peak	Spacewatch	·	2.9 km	MPC; JPL
15819 Alisterling	1994 SN_{9}	Alisterling	September 28, 1994	Kitt Peak	Spacewatch	·	3.1 km	MPC; JPL
15820	1994 TB	—	October 2, 1994	Mauna Kea	D. C. Jewitt, J. Chen	plutino	85 km	MPC; JPL
15821 Iijimatatsushi	1994 TM_{2}	Iijimatatsushi	October 2, 1994	Kitami	K. Endate, K. Watanabe	·	5.4 km	MPC; JPL
15822 Genefahnestock	1994 TV_{15}	Genefahnestock	October 8, 1994	Palomar	E. F. Helin	H · moon	1.7 km	MPC; JPL
15823	1994 UO_{1}	—	October 25, 1994	Kushiro	S. Ueda, H. Kaneda	·	1.9 km	MPC; JPL
15824	1994 WM_{1}	—	November 27, 1994	Oizumi	T. Kobayashi	PHO	7.1 km	MPC; JPL
15825 Capecchi	1994 WX_{1}	Capecchi	November 30, 1994	Farra d'Isonzo	Farra d'Isonzo	·	3.4 km	MPC; JPL
15826	1994 YO	—	December 28, 1994	Oizumi	T. Kobayashi	·	2.4 km	MPC; JPL
15827	1995 AO_{1}	—	January 10, 1995	Oizumi	T. Kobayashi	·	6.1 km	MPC; JPL
15828 Sincheskul	1995 BS	Sincheskul	January 23, 1995	Oizumi	T. Kobayashi	V	2.6 km	MPC; JPL
15829	1995 BA_{1}	—	January 25, 1995	Oizumi	T. Kobayashi	EUN	4.6 km	MPC; JPL
15830	1995 BW_{1}	—	January 27, 1995	Oizumi	T. Kobayashi	·	2.9 km	MPC; JPL
15831	1995 BG_{3}	—	January 29, 1995	Nachi-Katsuura	Y. Shimizu, T. Urata	·	9.0 km	MPC; JPL
15832	1995 CB_{1}	—	February 7, 1995	Chiyoda	T. Kojima	·	2.9 km	MPC; JPL
15833	1995 CL_{1}	—	February 3, 1995	Nyukasa	M. Hirasawa, S. Suzuki	slow	9.0 km	MPC; JPL
15834 McBride	1995 CT_{1}	McBride	February 4, 1995	Siding Spring	D. J. Asher	PAL	8.0 km	MPC; JPL
15835	1995 DY	—	February 21, 1995	Oizumi	T. Kobayashi	·	3.7 km	MPC; JPL
15836	1995 DA_{2}	—	February 24, 1995	Mauna Kea	J. X. Luu, D. C. Jewitt	res · 3:4	90 km	MPC; JPL
15837 Mariovalori	1995 DG_{13}	Mariovalori	February 25, 1995	Cima Ekar	M. Tombelli	THM	7.3 km	MPC; JPL
15838 Auclair	1995 FU_{12}	Auclair	March 27, 1995	Kitt Peak	Spacewatch	·	5.7 km	MPC; JPL
15839	1995 JH_{1}	—	May 5, 1995	Caussols	E. W. Elst	THM	8.8 km	MPC; JPL
15840 Hiroshiendou	1995 KH_{1}	Hiroshiendou	May 31, 1995	Nanyo	T. Okuni	GEF	5.9 km	MPC; JPL
15841 Yamaguchi	1995 OX	Yamaguchi	July 27, 1995	Kuma Kogen	A. Nakamura	·	7.6 km	MPC; JPL
15842	1995 SX_{2}	—	September 20, 1995	Kushiro	S. Ueda, H. Kaneda	NYS	8.2 km	MPC; JPL
15843 Comcom	1995 SO_{3}	Comcom	September 20, 1995	Kitami	K. Endate, K. Watanabe	·	5.7 km	MPC; JPL
15844	1995 UQ_{5}	—	October 20, 1995	Nachi-Katsuura	Y. Shimizu, T. Urata	·	13 km	MPC; JPL
15845 Bambi	1995 UC_{17}	Bambi	October 17, 1995	Kitt Peak	Spacewatch	V	2.5 km	MPC; JPL
15846 Billfyfe	1995 UK_{28}	Billfyfe	October 20, 1995	Kitt Peak	Spacewatch	·	3.0 km	MPC; JPL
15847	1995 WA_{2}	—	November 18, 1995	Oizumi	T. Kobayashi	·	3.3 km	MPC; JPL
15848	1995 YJ_{4}	—	December 28, 1995	Siding Spring	R. H. McNaught	T_{j} (2.99)	18 km	MPC; JPL
15849 Billharper	1995 YM_{10}	Billharper	December 18, 1995	Kitt Peak	Spacewatch	KOR	4.4 km	MPC; JPL
15850	1996 AE_{1}	—	January 12, 1996	Oizumi	T. Kobayashi	·	11 km	MPC; JPL
15851 Chrisfleming	1996 AD_{10}	Chrisfleming	January 13, 1996	Kitt Peak	Spacewatch	EUN	6.6 km	MPC; JPL
15852	1996 BR_{1}	—	January 23, 1996	Oizumi	T. Kobayashi	·	3.5 km	MPC; JPL
15853 Benedettafoglia	1996 BB_{13}	Benedettafoglia	January 16, 1996	Cima Ekar	U. Munari, M. Tombelli	·	3.9 km	MPC; JPL
15854 Numa	1996 CX_{2}	Numa	February 15, 1996	Colleverde	V. S. Casulli	·	2.5 km	MPC; JPL
15855 Mariasalvatore	1996 CP_{7}	Mariasalvatore	February 14, 1996	Cima Ekar	M. Tombelli, U. Munari	·	2.7 km	MPC; JPL
15856 Yanokoji	1996 EL	Yanokoji	March 10, 1996	Kitami	K. Endate, K. Watanabe	·	6.1 km	MPC; JPL
15857 Touji	1996 EK_{1}	Touji	March 10, 1996	Kitami	K. Endate, K. Watanabe	·	3.3 km	MPC; JPL
15858 Davidwoods	1996 EK_{15}	Davidwoods	March 12, 1996	Kitt Peak	Spacewatch	·	1.7 km	MPC; JPL
15859	1996 GO_{18}	—	April 15, 1996	La Silla	E. W. Elst	·	2.7 km	MPC; JPL
15860 Siráň	1996 HO	Siráň	April 20, 1996	Modra	A. Galád, D. Kalmančok	·	2.4 km	MPC; JPL
15861 Ispahan	1996 HB_{12}	Ispahan	April 17, 1996	La Silla	E. W. Elst	slow	8.8 km	MPC; JPL
15862	1996 HJ_{15}	—	April 17, 1996	La Silla	E. W. Elst	·	3.8 km	MPC; JPL
15863	1996 HT_{15}	—	April 18, 1996	La Silla	E. W. Elst	KOR	5.2 km	MPC; JPL
15864	1996 HQ_{23}	—	April 20, 1996	La Silla	E. W. Elst	·	2.6 km	MPC; JPL
15865	1996 HW_{25}	—	April 20, 1996	La Silla	E. W. Elst	·	4.0 km	MPC; JPL
15866	1996 KG	—	May 16, 1996	Višnjan Observatory	Višnjan	·	3.8 km	MPC; JPL
15867	1996 NK_{5}	—	July 14, 1996	La Silla	E. W. Elst	THM	9.2 km	MPC; JPL
15868 Akiyoshidai	1996 OL	Akiyoshidai	July 16, 1996	Kuma Kogen	A. Nakamura	·	5.6 km	MPC; JPL
15869 Tullius	1996 PL	Tullius	August 8, 1996	Colleverde	V. S. Casulli	·	3.9 km	MPC; JPL
15870 Obůrka	1996 QD	Obůrka	August 16, 1996	Ondřejov	P. Pravec	·	5.0 km	MPC; JPL
15871	1996 QX_{1}	—	August 24, 1996	Kushiro	S. Ueda, H. Kaneda	EUN	7.2 km	MPC; JPL
15872	1996 RJ_{4}	—	September 11, 1996	Haleakala	NEAT	·	6.2 km	MPC; JPL
15873	1996 TH_{7}	—	October 5, 1996	Nachi-Katsuura	Y. Shimizu, T. Urata	·	7.0 km	MPC; JPL
15874	1996 TL_{66}	—	October 9, 1996	Mauna Kea	C. A. Trujillo, D. C. Jewitt, J. X. Luu, J. Chen	SDO	339 km	MPC; JPL
15875	1996 TP_{66}	—	October 11, 1996	Mauna Kea	J. X. Luu, D. C. Jewitt, C. A. Trujillo	plutino	350 km	MPC; JPL
15876	1996 VO_{38}	—	November 12, 1996	Kushiro	S. Ueda, H. Kaneda	KOR	4.7 km	MPC; JPL
15877	1996 WZ_{1}	—	November 24, 1996	Xinglong	SCAP	·	11 km	MPC; JPL
15878	1996 XC_{3}	—	December 3, 1996	Oizumi	T. Kobayashi	·	15 km	MPC; JPL
15879	1996 XH_{6}	—	December 3, 1996	Nachi-Katsuura	Y. Shimizu, T. Urata	KOR	4.3 km	MPC; JPL
15880	1997 AM_{7}	—	January 9, 1997	Oizumi	T. Kobayashi	·	4.2 km	MPC; JPL
15881	1997 CU	—	February 1, 1997	Oizumi	T. Kobayashi	·	4.6 km	MPC; JPL
15882 Dingzhong	1997 CF_{29}	Dingzhong	February 7, 1997	Xinglong	SCAP	·	3.8 km	MPC; JPL
15883	1997 CR_{29}	—	February 3, 1997	Mauna Kea	C. A. Trujillo, J. Chen, D. C. Jewitt	cubewano (hot)	182 km	MPC; JPL
15884 Maspalomas	1997 DJ	Maspalomas	February 27, 1997	Chichibu	N. Satō	V	2.9 km	MPC; JPL
15885	1997 EE	—	March 1, 1997	Oizumi	T. Kobayashi	·	2.2 km	MPC; JPL
15886	1997 EB_{6}	—	March 7, 1997	Oizumi	T. Kobayashi	NYS	2.6 km	MPC; JPL
15887 Daveclark	1997 ER_{26}	Daveclark	March 4, 1997	Kitt Peak	Spacewatch	·	7.7 km	MPC; JPL
15888	1997 EE_{29}	—	March 13, 1997	Višnjan Observatory	Višnjan	MAS	2.4 km	MPC; JPL
15889 Xiaoyuhe	1997 FD_{4}	Xiaoyuhe	March 31, 1997	Socorro	LINEAR	·	1.9 km	MPC; JPL
15890 Prachatice	1997 GY	Prachatice	April 3, 1997	Kleť	M. Tichý, Z. Moravec	·	2.5 km	MPC; JPL
15891 Alissazhang	1997 GG_{7}	Alissazhang	April 2, 1997	Socorro	LINEAR	·	3.3 km	MPC; JPL
15892	1997 GB_{14}	—	April 3, 1997	Socorro	LINEAR	·	2.6 km	MPC; JPL
15893	1997 GV_{20}	—	April 6, 1997	Socorro	LINEAR	·	3.3 km	MPC; JPL
15894	1997 JA_{13}	—	May 3, 1997	La Silla	E. W. Elst	·	3.5 km	MPC; JPL
15895	1997 JJ_{15}	—	May 3, 1997	La Silla	E. W. Elst	·	2.8 km	MPC; JPL
15896 Birkhoff	1997 LX_{5}	Birkhoff	June 13, 1997	Prescott	P. G. Comba	MAS	2.1 km	MPC; JPL
15897 Beňačková	1997 PD_{3}	Beňačková	August 10, 1997	Ondřejov	P. Pravec	·	2.7 km	MPC; JPL
15898 Kharasterteam	1997 QP	Kharasterteam	August 26, 1997	Ondřejov	P. Pravec, L. Kotková	MAR	6.1 km	MPC; JPL
15899 Silvain	1997 RR_{1}	Silvain	September 3, 1997	Bédoin	P. Antonini	·	2.5 km	MPC; JPL
15900	1997 RK_{3}	—	September 3, 1997	Xinglong	SCAP	V	3.2 km	MPC; JPL

== 15901–16000 ==
back to top

Designation			Discovery			Properties		Ref
Permanent	Provisional	Named after	Date	Site	Discoverer(s)	Category	Diam.	Ref
15901	1997 RY_{8}	—	September 12, 1997	Xinglong	SCAP	·	7.0 km	MPC; JPL
15902 Dostál	1997 RA_{9}	Dostál	September 13, 1997	Ondřejov	L. Kotková	·	2.8 km	MPC; JPL
15903 Rolandflorrie	1997 RP_{10}	Rolandflorrie	September 5, 1997	Burlington	Handley, T.	EUN	4.2 km	MPC; JPL
15904 Halstead	1997 SD_{11}	Halstead	September 29, 1997	Zeno	T. Stafford	·	3.8 km	MPC; JPL
15905 Berthier	1997 SV_{15}	Berthier	September 27, 1997	Caussols	ODAS	·	4.1 km	MPC; JPL
15906 Yoshikaneda	1997 SX_{21}	Yoshikaneda	September 30, 1997	Nanyo	T. Okuni	·	2.5 km	MPC; JPL
15907 Robot	1997 TG_{10}	Robot	October 6, 1997	Ondřejov	P. Pravec	·	2.0 km	MPC; JPL
15908 Bertoni	1997 TE_{12}	Bertoni	October 2, 1997	Kitt Peak	Spacewatch	·	7.9 km	MPC; JPL
15909	1997 TM_{17}	—	October 8, 1997	Oizumi	T. Kobayashi	·	4.3 km	MPC; JPL
15910 Shinkamigoto	1997 TU_{17}	Shinkamigoto	October 6, 1997	Kitami	K. Endate, K. Watanabe	·	3.5 km	MPC; JPL
15911 Davidgauthier	1997 TL_{21}	Davidgauthier	October 4, 1997	Kitt Peak	Spacewatch	NYS	1.9 km	MPC; JPL
15912	1997 TR_{26}	—	October 13, 1997	Xinglong	SCAP	NYS ·	7.0 km	MPC; JPL
15913 Telemachus	1997 TZ_{27}	Telemachus	October 1, 1997	La Silla	Uppsala-DLR Trojan Survey	L4	17 km	MPC; JPL
15914	1997 UM_{3}	—	October 26, 1997	Oizumi	T. Kobayashi	NYS	4.6 km	MPC; JPL
15915	1997 UR_{3}	—	October 26, 1997	Oizumi	T. Kobayashi	·	4.1 km	MPC; JPL
15916 Shigeoyamada	1997 UL_{7}	Shigeoyamada	October 25, 1997	Chichibu	N. Satō	·	4.5 km	MPC; JPL
15917 Rosahavel	1997 UX_{7}	Rosahavel	October 28, 1997	Ondřejov	L. Kotková	DOR	11 km	MPC; JPL
15918 Thereluzia	1997 UE_{9}	Thereluzia	October 27, 1997	Bornheim	Ehring, N.	·	2.7 km	MPC; JPL
15919	1997 UA_{22}	—	October 25, 1997	Nyukasa	M. Hirasawa, S. Suzuki	·	2.7 km	MPC; JPL
15920	1997 UB_{25}	—	October 29, 1997	Socorro	LINEAR	·	3.4 km	MPC; JPL
15921 Kintaikyo	1997 VP	Kintaikyo	November 1, 1997	Kuma Kogen	A. Nakamura	V	1.6 km	MPC; JPL
15922 Masajisaito	1997 VR	Masajisaito	November 1, 1997	Kitami	K. Endate, K. Watanabe	·	3.3 km	MPC; JPL
15923	1997 VN_{3}	—	November 6, 1997	Oizumi	T. Kobayashi	·	14 km	MPC; JPL
15924 Axelmartin	1997 VE_{5}	Axelmartin	November 7, 1997	Solingen	Koch, B.	NYS	4.1 km	MPC; JPL
15925 Rokycany	1997 VM_{6}	Rokycany	November 10, 1997	Ondřejov	L. Kotková	EUN	6.4 km	MPC; JPL
15926	1997 VP_{6}	—	November 5, 1997	Nachi-Katsuura	Y. Shimizu, T. Urata	·	3.8 km	MPC; JPL
15927	1997 WV_{2}	—	November 23, 1997	Oizumi	T. Kobayashi	·	5.0 km	MPC; JPL
15928	1997 WC_{3}	—	November 23, 1997	Oizumi	T. Kobayashi	·	6.2 km	MPC; JPL
15929 Ericlinton	1997 WQ_{11}	Ericlinton	November 22, 1997	Kitt Peak	Spacewatch	THM	11 km	MPC; JPL
15930	1997 WT_{37}	—	November 29, 1997	Socorro	LINEAR	·	2.8 km	MPC; JPL
15931	1997 WK_{45}	—	November 29, 1997	Socorro	LINEAR	THM	10 km	MPC; JPL
15932	1997 XL_{5}	—	December 2, 1997	Nachi-Katsuura	Y. Shimizu, T. Urata	·	6.6 km	MPC; JPL
15933	1997 YD	—	December 18, 1997	Oizumi	T. Kobayashi	·	4.3 km	MPC; JPL
15934	1997 YQ	—	December 20, 1997	Oizumi	T. Kobayashi	·	4.3 km	MPC; JPL
15935	1997 YT	—	December 20, 1997	Oizumi	T. Kobayashi	·	5.7 km	MPC; JPL
15936	1997 YM_{4}	—	December 22, 1997	Woomera	F. B. Zoltowski	EUN	4.8 km	MPC; JPL
15937	1997 YP_{5}	—	December 25, 1997	Oizumi	T. Kobayashi	·	4.9 km	MPC; JPL
15938 Bohnenblust	1997 YA_{8}	Bohnenblust	December 27, 1997	Prescott	P. G. Comba	·	4.8 km	MPC; JPL
15939 Fessenden	1997 YP_{8}	Fessenden	December 28, 1997	Kitt Peak	Spacewatch	·	12 km	MPC; JPL
15940	1997 YU_{13}	—	December 31, 1997	Oizumi	T. Kobayashi	KOR	5.9 km	MPC; JPL
15941 Stevegauthier	1997 YX_{15}	Stevegauthier	December 29, 1997	Kitt Peak	Spacewatch	·	15 km	MPC; JPL
15942	1997 YZ_{16}	—	December 23, 1997	Kushiro	S. Ueda, H. Kaneda	·	2.8 km	MPC; JPL
15943	1998 AZ	—	January 5, 1998	Oizumi	T. Kobayashi	EOS	8.3 km	MPC; JPL
15944	1998 AH_{5}	—	January 8, 1998	Caussols	ODAS	THM	9.8 km	MPC; JPL
15945 Raymondavid	1998 AZ_{5}	Raymondavid	January 8, 1998	Caussols	ODAS	HYG	10 km	MPC; JPL
15946 Satinský	1998 AP_{7}	Satinský	January 8, 1998	Modra	A. Galád, Pravda, A.	·	4.7 km	MPC; JPL
15947 Milligan	1998 AL_{10}	Milligan	January 2, 1998	Reedy Creek	J. Broughton	·	4.5 km	MPC; JPL
15948	1998 BE	—	January 16, 1998	Oizumi	T. Kobayashi	·	12 km	MPC; JPL
15949 Rhaeticus	1998 BQ	Rhaeticus	January 17, 1998	Davidschlag	E. Meyer, E. Obermair	·	3.6 km	MPC; JPL
15950 Dallago	1998 BA_{2}	Dallago	January 17, 1998	Dossobuono	Madonna di Dossobuono	(5)	3.3 km	MPC; JPL
15951	1998 BB_{2}	—	January 17, 1998	Dossobuono	Lai, L.	·	16 km	MPC; JPL
15952	1998 BM_{7}	—	January 24, 1998	Haleakala	NEAT	·	12 km	MPC; JPL
15953	1998 BD_{8}	—	January 25, 1998	Oizumi	T. Kobayashi	EUN	6.7 km	MPC; JPL
15954 Divjotbedi	1998 BG_{11}	Divjotbedi	January 23, 1998	Socorro	LINEAR	PAD	12 km	MPC; JPL
15955 Johannesgmunden	1998 BS_{13}	Johannesgmunden	January 26, 1998	Davidschlag	E. Meyer	AGN	5.9 km	MPC; JPL
15956	1998 BY_{24}	—	January 28, 1998	Oizumi	T. Kobayashi	KOR	4.7 km	MPC; JPL
15957 Gemoore	1998 BB_{27}	Gemoore	January 22, 1998	Kitt Peak	Spacewatch	KOR	5.3 km	MPC; JPL
15958	1998 BE_{33}	—	January 30, 1998	Caussols	ODAS	·	9.2 km	MPC; JPL
15959	1998 BQ_{40}	—	January 24, 1998	Haleakala	NEAT	·	5.8 km	MPC; JPL
15960 Hluboká	1998 CH	Hluboká	February 2, 1998	Kleť	M. Tichý, Z. Moravec	HNS	7.9 km	MPC; JPL
15961	1998 CC_{1}	—	February 4, 1998	Xinglong	SCAP	GEF	6.1 km	MPC; JPL
15962	1998 CM_{2}	—	February 15, 1998	Xinglong	SCAP	NYS ·	7.4 km	MPC; JPL
15963 Koeberl	1998 CY_{3}	Koeberl	February 6, 1998	La Silla	E. W. Elst	EUN	8.6 km	MPC; JPL
15964 Billgray	1998 DU	Billgray	February 19, 1998	Oaxaca	Roe, J. M.	H	2.2 km	MPC; JPL
15965 Robertcox	1998 DU_{7}	Robertcox	February 23, 1998	Oaxaca	Roe, J. M.	EOS	10 km	MPC; JPL
15966	1998 DL_{13}	—	February 25, 1998	Haleakala	NEAT	(1298)	14 km	MPC; JPL
15967 Clairearmstrong	1998 DN_{20}	Clairearmstrong	February 24, 1998	Rolvenden	M. Armstrong	·	14 km	MPC; JPL
15968 Waltercugno	1998 DX_{35}	Waltercugno	February 27, 1998	Cima Ekar	M. Tombelli, C. Casacci	THM	10 km	MPC; JPL
15969 Charlesgreen	1998 EW_{11}	Charlesgreen	March 1, 1998	La Silla	E. W. Elst	·	20 km	MPC; JPL
15970 Robertbrownlee	1998 FA_{9}	Robertbrownlee	March 22, 1998	Kitt Peak	Spacewatch	·	2.2 km	MPC; JPL
15971 Hestroffer	1998 FA_{11}	Hestroffer	March 25, 1998	Caussols	ODAS	·	3.2 km	MPC; JPL
15972	1998 FM_{27}	—	March 20, 1998	Socorro	LINEAR	·	10 km	MPC; JPL
15973	1998 FM_{85}	—	March 24, 1998	Socorro	LINEAR	EOS	7.3 km	MPC; JPL
15974	1998 FL_{103}	—	March 31, 1998	Socorro	LINEAR	EMA	16 km	MPC; JPL
15975	1998 FW_{108}	—	March 31, 1998	Socorro	LINEAR	(1298)	10 km	MPC; JPL
15976 Bhansali	1998 FY_{119}	Bhansali	March 20, 1998	Socorro	LINEAR	EOS	7.6 km	MPC; JPL
15977 Pyraechmes	1998 MA_{11}	Pyraechmes	June 19, 1998	Socorro	LINEAR	L5 · slow	44 km	MPC; JPL
15978	1998 QL_{1}	—	August 17, 1998	Višnjan Observatory	Višnjan	·	3.8 km	MPC; JPL
15979	1998 QW_{34}	—	August 17, 1998	Socorro	LINEAR	·	11 km	MPC; JPL
15980	1998 RC_{19}	—	September 14, 1998	Socorro	LINEAR	·	7.3 km	MPC; JPL
15981	1998 UP_{6}	—	October 18, 1998	Nachi-Katsuura	Y. Shimizu, T. Urata	(194)	7.5 km	MPC; JPL
15982	1998 VA_{4}	—	November 11, 1998	Caussols	ODAS	PHO	3.2 km	MPC; JPL
15983	1998 WM_{1}	—	November 18, 1998	Oizumi	T. Kobayashi	·	5.5 km	MPC; JPL
15984	1998 WM_{7}	—	November 24, 1998	Socorro	LINEAR	fast	6.8 km	MPC; JPL
15985 Bhatnagar	1998 WU_{20}	Bhatnagar	November 18, 1998	Socorro	LINEAR	·	6.3 km	MPC; JPL
15986 Fienga	1998 XU_{1}	Fienga	December 7, 1998	Caussols	ODAS	·	7.3 km	MPC; JPL
15987	1998 XV_{10}	—	December 15, 1998	Caussols	ODAS	·	3.2 km	MPC; JPL
15988 Parini	1998 XD_{24}	Parini	December 11, 1998	Kitt Peak	Spacewatch	·	3.4 km	MPC; JPL
15989 Anusha	1998 XK_{39}	Anusha	December 14, 1998	Socorro	LINEAR	·	3.7 km	MPC; JPL
15990	1998 YT_{1}	—	December 17, 1998	Višnjan Observatory	K. Korlević	NYS	2.9 km	MPC; JPL
15991	1998 YH_{3}	—	December 17, 1998	Oizumi	T. Kobayashi	·	4.4 km	MPC; JPL
15992 Cynthia	1998 YL_{4}	Cynthia	December 18, 1998	Farpoint	G. Hug	V	3.7 km	MPC; JPL
15993	1998 YH_{8}	—	December 24, 1998	Oizumi	T. Kobayashi	(5)	4.8 km	MPC; JPL
15994	1998 YO_{8}	—	December 23, 1998	Višnjan Observatory	K. Korlević	·	3.9 km	MPC; JPL
15995	1998 YQ_{9}	—	December 25, 1998	Višnjan Observatory	K. Korlević, M. Jurić	·	3.6 km	MPC; JPL
15996	1998 YC_{12}	—	December 27, 1998	Oizumi	T. Kobayashi	·	5.1 km	MPC; JPL
15997	1999 AX	—	January 7, 1999	Oizumi	T. Kobayashi	EUN	5.7 km	MPC; JPL
15998	1999 AG_{2}	—	January 9, 1999	Oizumi	T. Kobayashi	·	7.0 km	MPC; JPL
15999	1999 AG_{7}	—	January 9, 1999	Višnjan Observatory	K. Korlević	·	3.5 km	MPC; JPL
16000 Neilgehrels	1999 AW_{16}	Neilgehrels	January 10, 1999	Kitt Peak	Spacewatch	NYS	2.7 km	MPC; JPL

back to top

== See also ==
- Meanings of minor-planet names: 15001–16000
