= Giuseppe Forti =

Italian astronomer

Minor planets discovered: 49
see § List of discovered minor planets

Giuseppe Forti (December 21, 1939 – July 2, 2007) was an Italian astronomer and a discoverer of asteroids.

Forti was a trained solar physicist, and worked at Harvard's Radio Meteor Project and later at the Arcetri Observatory, in Florence, Italy. He was a member of the third IAU Division: Planetary Systems Sciences. The Minor Planet Center credits him with the discovery of 49 numbered minor planets during 1977–2001.

He died at the age of 67 on July 2, 2007. The main-belt asteroid 6876 Beppeforti, discovered by his colleges Andrea Boattini and Maura Tombelli at the Asiago Astrophysical Observatory in 1994, was named in his honor. Naming citation was published on 3 May 1996 (M.P.C. 27129).

== List of discovered minor planets ==
10591 Caverni ^{[A]}	August 13, 1996
10928 Caprara ^{[A]}	January 25, 1998
11337 Sandro ^{[A]}	August 10, 1996
11621 Duccio ^{[A]}	August 15, 1996
12044 Fabbri ^{[A]}	March 29, 1997
12928 Nicolapozio ^{[B]}	September 30, 1999
14659 Gregoriana ^{[A]}	January 15, 1999
14953 Bevilacqua ^{[A]}	February 13, 1996
15004 Vallerani ^{[A]}	December 7, 1997
15006 Samcristoforetti ^{[A]}	February 27, 1998
(15098) 2000 AY_{2} ^{[B]}	January 1, 2000
15360 Moncalvo ^{[A]}	February 14, 1996
15418 Sergiospinelli ^{[A]}	February 27, 1998
17019 Aldo ^{[A]}	February 23, 1999
18628 Taniasagrati ^{[A]}	February 27, 1998
20200 Donbacky ^{[A]}	February 28, 1997
(22517) 1998 DX_{32} ^{[A]}	February 26, 1998

(26497) 2000 CS_{1} ^{[B]}	February 3, 2000
27005 Dariaguidetti ^{[A]}	February 27, 1998
(27364) 2000 EJ_{14} ^{[B]}	March 3, 2000
(29550) 1998 BE_{44} ^{[A]}	January 25, 1998
(31153) 1997 UP_{22} ^{[A]}	October 26, 1997
33162 Sofiarandich ^{[A]}	February 27, 1998
35464 Elisaconsigli ^{[A]}	February 27, 1998
39871 Lucagrazzini ^{[A]}	February 27, 1998
39875 Matteolombardo ^{[A]}	February 27, 1998
42929 Francini ^{[C]}	October 8, 1999
46701 Interrante ^{[A]}	February 7, 1997
46702 Linapucci ^{[A]}	February 28, 1997
(48381) 1977 SU_{3} ^{[B]}	September 17, 1977
48842 Alexmazzanti ^{[A]}	January 25, 1998
49987 Bonata ^{[C]}	January 3, 2000
(53053) 1998 XH_{9} ^{[A]}	December 12, 1998
58572 Romanella ^{[A]}	September 7, 1997

58702 Tizianabitossi ^{[A]}	January 25, 1998
58709 Zenocolò ^{[C]}	February 14, 1998
70744 Maffucci^{[C]}	November 9, 1999
82463 Mluigiaborsi^{[C]}	July 21, 2001
(82657) 2001 PA_{14} ^{[B]}	August 14, 2001
86195 Cireglio ^{[C]}	September 30, 1999
(108702) 2001 OX_{16} ^{[A]}	July 21, 2001
(103249) 2000 AA_{5} ^{[B]}	January 3, 2000
103421 Laurmatt ^{[C]}	January 6, 2000
108205 Baccipaolo ^{[C]}	April 26, 2001
(121770) 2000 AV_{2} ^{[B]}	January 1, 2000
137082 Maurobachini ^{[C]}	December 12, 1998
(153468) 2001 RO_{16} ^{[B]}	September 9, 2001
(192927) 2000 AH_{6} ^{[B]}	January 3, 2000
193818 Polidoro ^{[C]}	August 16, 2001
(347537) 1999 YY_{13} ^{[C]}	December 31, 1999
^{A} with M. Tombelli^{B} with A. Boattini^{C} with L. Tesi
