= Meanings of minor-planet names: 15001–16000 =

As minor planet discoveries are confirmed, they are given a permanent number by the IAU's Minor Planet Center (MPC), and the discoverers can then submit names for them, following the IAU's naming conventions. The list below concerns those minor planets in the specified number-range that have received names, and explains the meanings of those names.

Official naming citations of newly named small Solar System bodies are approved and published in a bulletin by IAU's Working Group for Small Bodies Nomenclature (WGSBN). Before May 2021, citations were published in MPC's Minor Planet Circulars for many decades. Recent citations can also be found on the JPL Small-Body Database (SBDB). Until his death in 2016, German astronomer Lutz D. Schmadel compiled these citations into the Dictionary of Minor Planet Names (DMP) and regularly updated the collection.

Based on Paul Herget's The Names of the Minor Planets, Schmadel also researched the unclear origin of numerous asteroids, most of which had been named prior to World War II. This article incorporates text from this source, which is in the public domain: SBDB New namings may only be added to this list below after official publication as the preannouncement of names is condemned. The WGSBN publishes a comprehensive guideline for the naming rules of non-cometary small Solar System bodies.

== 15001–15100 ==
Named minor planet	Provisional	This minor planet was named for...	Ref; Catalog
15001 Fuzhou	1997 WD_{30}	Fuzhou, the capital of Fujian Province, P.R. China.	JPL · 15001
15002 Shahriarbayegan	1997 WN_{38}	Shahriar Bayegan (1951–2021), Iranian physicist and member of the faculty at the Physics Department at Tehran University.	JPL · 15002
15003 Midori	1997 XC_{10}	Midori Gotō (born 1971), an extremely talented violinist, and she has also contributed much to musical education for children.	JPL · 15003
15004 Vallerani	1997 XL_{10}	Ernesto Vallerani (born 1936) has participated in numerous important European and international scientific programs, notably playing a key role in space activities in Italy's Piedmont region.	JPL · 15004
15005 Guerriero	1997 XY_{10}	Luciano Guerriero (born 1930) played a key role in the development of the first Italian National Space Program and the promotion of important international space research missions in astronomy.	JPL · 15005
15006 Samcristoforetti	1998 DZ_{32}	Samantha Cristoforetti (born 1977), the first Italian female astronaut.	JPL · 15006
15007 Edoardopozio	1998 NA	Edoardo Pozio (born 1952), Italian biologist and researcher in the field of zoonotic parasitic diseases at the Istituto Superiore di Sanità in Rome. He serves as director of the European Commission's Community Reference Laboratory of Parasites.	JPL · 15007
15008 Delahodde	1998 QO_{6}	Catherine E. Delahodde (born 1974), French astronomer and recoverer of several comets at ESO's La Silla Observatory	JPL · 15008
15009 Johnwheeler	1998 QF_{27}	John Craig Wheeler (born 1943), American astrophysicist.	JPL · 15009
15014 Annagekker	1998 RO_{74}	Anna Gekker (born 1985), 2003 Intel STS finalist. She attended the Brooklyn Technical High School, Brooklyn, New York.	JPL · 15014
15017 Cuppy	1998 SS_{25}	Will Cuppy (1884–1949), American humorist and journalist. A gentle satirist, he is well known for his books The Decline and Fall of Practically Everybody, How to Attract the Wombat, How to Become Extinct and How to Tell Your Friends from the Apes. The name was suggested by M. Walter.	JPL · 15017
15019 Gingold	1998 SW_{75}	Julian A. Gingold (born 1985), 2003 Intel STS finalist. He attended the New Rochelle High School, New Rochelle, New York.	JPL · 15019
15020 Brandonimber	1998 SV_{105}	Brandon Stuart Imber (born 1985), 2003 Intel STS finalist. He attended the Commack High School, Commack, New York.	JPL · 15020
15021 Alexkardon	1998 SX_{123}	Alex Kardon (born 1985), 2003 Intel STS finalist. He attended the South Side High School, Rockville Centre, New York.	JPL · 15021
15022 Francinejackson	1998 SM_{144}	Francine Jackson (born 1949), American astronomer.	JPL · 15022
15023 Ketover	1998 SP_{156}	Daniel Jacob Ketover (born 1985), 2003 Intel STS finalist. He attended the Syosset High School, Syosset, New York.	JPL · 15023
15025 Uwontario	1998 TX_{28}	University of Western Ontario is located in London, Canada, and was founded in 1878. The Hume Cronyn Memorial Observatory was built on campus in 1940, and the university has a 1.2-m telescope at the Elginfield Observatory. The name was suggested by R. Jedicke and P. Jedicke.	JPL · 15025
15026 Davidscott	1998 TR_{34}	David Holcomb Scott (1916–2000) was a member of the USGS lunar geologic mapping team during the Apollo program, the senior author of the USGS geologic map of Mars based on the Mariner 9 data, and the coordinator for the preparation of the Mars Geologic Atlas.	JPL · 15026
15028 Soushiyou	1998 UL_{23}	Soushiyoukouen is a park on a hill located in the northern part of Nanyo-city, Yamagata prefecture in Japan. This park is known for pine wood, cherry trees, roses, chrysanthemums and the Nanyo Citizen Observatory	JPL · 15028
15030 Matthewkroll	1998 VA_{15}	Matthew Jay Kroll (born 1985), 2003 Intel STS finalist. He attended the Byram Hills High School, Armonk, New York.	JPL · 15030
15031 Lemus	1998 VN_{28}	Bryan A. Lemus (born 1985), 2003 Intel STS finalist. He attended the Dr. Michael M. Krop High School, Miami, Florida.	JPL · 15031
15032 Alexlevin	1998 VV_{28}	Alex Levin (born 1985), 2003 Intel STS finalist. He attended the Stuyvesant High School, New York, New York.	JPL · 15032
15034 Décines	1998 WH	The French town of Décines-Charpieu, west of Lione. The town is twinned with Monsummano Terme, Italy, the birthplace of Luciano Tesi, the co-discoverer of this minor planet.	JPL · 15034
15036 Giovannianselmi	1998 WO_{5}	Giovanni Anselmi, editor of the Italian astronomy journal Coelum	JPL · 15036
15037 Chassagne	1998 WN_{6}	Robin Chassagne (born 1962), a discoverer of minor planets and supernovae	JPL · 15037
15040 Zhangchao	1998 XC	Zhang Chao, Chinese astronomy communicator, astrophotographer and microphotographer.	IAU · 15040
15041 Paperetti	1998 XB_{5}	Emiliano Paperetti (born 1951), Italian amateur astronomer from Pistoia, Tuscany	JPL · 15041
15042 Anndavgui	1998 XZ_{8}	Annick Merlin (born 1953), David Merlin (born 1985), and Guillaume Merlin (born 1989), wife and sons of the discoverer Jean-Claude Merlin, respectively	JPL · 15042
15045 Walesdymond	1998 XY_{21}	William Wales (1734–1798) and his assistant Joseph Dymond (1746–1796), British astronomers sent to the shores of Hudson Bay by the Royal Society of London to observe the transit of Venus in 1769 Src	JPL · 15045
15050 Heddal	1998 XC_{96}	Heddal, a small school located in and named after the a small village of Heddal in southern Norway.	JPL · 15050
15052 Emileschweitzer	1998 YD_{2}	Emile Schweitzer (born 1923) was for 25 years president of the Association Françoise des Etoiles Variables.	JPL · 15052
15053 Bochníček	1998 YY_{2}	Záviš Bochníček (1920–2002), Czech astronomer who worked at the Comenius University in Bratislava, Slovakia	JPL · 15053
15056 Barbaradixon	1998 YP_{12}	Barbara Dixon, software developer and engineer. This minor planet was discovered by David S. Dixon.	JPL · 15056
15057 Whitson	1998 YY_{15}	Peggy Whitson (born 1960), American astronaut and biochemist	JPL · 15057
15058 Billcooke	1998 YL_{16}	Bill Cooke (born 1958), American space weather scientist who generates custom meteor activity forecasts	JPL · 15058
15067 Zhuangtianshan	1999 AM_{9}	Zhuang Tianshan, Chinese historian of astronomy renowned for his research on ancient astronomical records in China.	IAU · 15067
15068 Wiegert	1999 AJ_{20}	Paul Wiegert (born 1967), Canadian astrodynamicist and discoverer of minor planets. He studied at Simon Fraser University, University of Toronto, York University and Queen's University. Wiegert helped identify 3753 Cruithne as the first minor planet known to be co-orbital with the Earth. The name was suggested by R. Jedicke and P. Jedicke.	JPL · 15068
15071 Hallerstein	1999 BN_{12}	Ferdinand Augustin Hallerstein (1703–1774), Slovenian Jesuit missionary to China, mathematician, astronomer, cartograph, and diplomat	JPL · 15071
15072 Landolt	1999 BS_{12}	Arlo U. Landolt (born 1935), a secretary of the American Astronomical Society and Professor at Louisiana State University. He has established the widely used Landolt Photometric Standard Stars through four decades of meticulous observations.	JPL · 15072
15076 Joellewis	1999 BL_{25}	Joel Brewster Lewis (born 1984), 2003 Intel STS finalist. He attended the Stuyvesant High School, New York, New York.	JPL · 15076
15077 Edyalge	1999 CA	Edy Alge (born 1934), a Swiss amateur astronomer from Widnau who has built many homemade telescopes of various sizes and spent most of his time expressing enthusiasm for the science of astronomy.	JPL · 15077
15083 Tianhuili	1999 CJ_{34}	Tianhui Michael Li (born 1985), 2003 Intel STS finalist. He attended the Oregon Episcopal School, Portland, Oregon.	JPL · 15083
15088 Licitra	1999 CK_{82}	Jeffrey Lawrence Licitra (born 1985), 2003 Intel STS finalist. He attended the Blind Brook High School, Rye Brook, New York.	JPL · 15088
15091 Howell	1999 CM_{136}	Steve B. Howell (born 1955), a student of cataclysmic variable stars, master of high-precision photometry and explorer of TOADs (tremendous outburst amplitude dwarf novae). He is equally at home developing theoretical stellar models, working with the latest instrumentation or mentoring students in esoteric astrophysics.	JPL · 15091
15092 Beegees	1999 EH_{5}	The Bee Gees' UK-born recording artists Barry, Robin, Maurice, and Andy Gibb were raised in Australia only 100 km from the discovery site.	JPL · 15092
15093 Lestermackey	1999 TA_{31}	Lester Wayne Mackey (born 1985), 2003 Intel STS finalist. He attended the Half Hollow Hills High School West, Dix Hills, New York.	JPL · 15093
15094 Polymele	1999 WB_{2}	Polymele from Greek mythology; wife of Menoetius and the mother of Patroclus	JPL · 15094
15099 Janestrohm	2000 AE_{92}	Jane Strohm, 2001 DYSC mentor. Strohm is a teacher at the Pistor Middle School, Tucson, Arizona.	JPL · 15099

== 15101–15200 ==
back to top

Named minor planet	Provisional	This minor planet was named for...	Ref; Catalog
15106 Swanson	2000 CA_{45}	Marie Swanson, 2001 DYSC mentor. Strohm is a teacher at the Pistor Middle School, Tucson, Arizona.	JPL · 15106
15107 Toepperwein	2000 CR_{49}	Mary Anne J. Toepperwein, 2001 DYSC mentor. Toepperwein is a teacher at the William P. Hobby Middle School, San Antonio, Texas.	JPL · 15107
15109 Wilber	2000 CW_{61}	Harold T. Wilber, 2001 DYSC mentor. Wilber is a teacher at the Franklin Middle School, Springfield, Illinois.	JPL · 15109
15111 Winters	2000 CY_{92}	Marlene K. Winters, 2001 DYSC mentor. Winters is a teacher at the International Montessori School, Venice, Florida.	JPL · 15111
15112 Arlenewolfe	2000 CY_{94}	Arlene E. Wolfe, 2001 DYSC mentor. Wolfe is a teacher at the Venerini Academy, Worcester, Massachusetts.	JPL · 15112
15115 Yvonneroe	2000 DA_{7}	Yvonne Roe (born 1935), wife of discoverer James M. Roe	JPL · 15115
15116 Jaytate	2000 DZ_{12}	Jonathan Tate (born 1955), an enthusiastic advocate of the search for hazardous near-Earth objects (NEOs) and founder of Spaceguard-UK and the Spaceguard Centre in Wales, UK.	JPL · 15116
15118 Elizabethsears	2000 DP_{82}	Elizabeth R. Sears, 2001 DYSC finalist. Elizabeth was a student at the All Saints Episcopal School, Lubbock, Texas.	JPL · 15118
15120 Mariafélix	2000 ES	Maria Jesús Albors Félix (born 1965) is the wife of the discoverer J. J. Gómez. This naming is in acknowledgment of her support, patience and understanding in accommodating the discoverer's work in observing minor planets.	JPL · 15120
15126 Brittanyanderson	2000 EA_{44}	Brittany L. Anderson, 2001 DYSC finalist. Brittany was a student at the House Junior High School, House, New Mexico.	JPL · 15126
15128 Patrickjones	2000 EG_{46}	Patrick K. Jones, 2001 DYSC finalist. Patrick was a student at the St. Michael Parish School, Wheeling, West Virginia.	JPL · 15128
15129 Sparks	2000 ET_{47}	Branson Sparks, 2001 DYSC finalist and named 2001 Nation's Top Young Scientist. Branson was a student at the Alexandria Country Day School, Alexandria, Louisiana.	MPC · 15129
15131 Alanalda	2000 ET_{54}	Alan Alda (born 1936) is an American actor, director, screenwriter and author. Best known as Benjamin Franklin "Hawkeye" Pierce in the TV series M.A.S.H. Alda has won numerous awards for his work including 6 Emmys and 6 Golden Globes. Alda hosted the acclaimed PBS series Scientific American Frontiers from 1993 to 2005	JPL · 15131
15132 Steigmeyer	2000 EZ_{69}	August J. Steigmeyer, 2001 DYSC finalist. August was a student at the Canterbury School, Ft. Wayne, Indiana.	JPL · 15132
15133 Sullivan	2000 EB_{91}	Cole J. Sullivan, 2001 DYSC finalist. Cole was a student at the Oslo Middle School, Vero Beach, Florida.	JPL · 15133
15139 Connormcarty	2000 EY_{93}	Connor W. McCarty, 2001 DYSC finalist. Connor was a student at the Mesa Union Junior High School, Somis, California.	JPL · 15139
15144 Araas	2000 EK_{114}	Michael J. Araas, 2001 DYSC finalist. Michael was a student at the Holy Name School, Sheridan, Wyoming.	JPL · 15144
15145 Ritageorge	2000 EF_{117}	Rita M. George, 2001 DYSC finalist. Rita was a student at the Manhattan Beach Middle School, Manhattan Beach, California.	JPL · 15145
15146 Halpov	2000 EQ_{130}	Harold R. Povenmire (born 1939), American amateur astronomer and meteor observer has extensively searched the Georgia strewn field in an effort to find tektites and understand their complicated geology. He recently published the book Tektites: A Cosmic Enigma. He has also been an avid observer of grazing lunar occultations and of occultations by minor planets.	JPL · 15146
15147 Siegfried	2000 EJ_{134}	Ray M. Siegfried (born 1943) is active in numerous civic, business, cultural and community associations.	JPL · 15147
15148 Michaelmaryott	2000 EM_{141}	Michael Maryott (1936–2009) was the owner of a company that maintains research microscopes for laboratories at the University of Arizona, especially the Lunar and Planetary Laboratory. He was a prospector, silversmith, photographer, craftsman, musician, scientist, educator and Arizona historian	JPL · 15148
15149 Loufaix	2000 EZ_{141}	Louis Faix (1933–2011), an amateur astronomer originally from the Detroit area in Michigan, retired to Saddlebrooke, Arizona.	JPL · 15149
15150 Salsa	2000 EO_{148}	The San Antonio League of Sidewalk Astronomers, is an astronomy club whose passionate members are dedicated to sharing the night sky with everyone in a fun and friendly environment	JPL · 15150
15151 Wilmacherup	2000 EU_{148}	Wilma Cherup (1915–2010), of the Amateur Astronomers' Association of Pittsburgh, became The Astronomical League's Executive Secretary in 1954.	JPL · 15151
15155 Ahn	2000 FB_{37}	Ryan J. Ahn, 2001 DYSC finalist. Ryan was a student at the Landisville Middle School, Landisville, Pennsylvania.	JPL · 15155
15160 Wygoda	2000 FK_{44}	Jennifer A. Wygoda, 2001 DYSC finalist. Jennifer was a student at the F. K. White Middle School, Lake Charles, Louisiana.	JPL · 15160
15168 Marijnfranx	2022 P-L	Marijn Franx (born 1960), Dutch astronomer at Leiden. His research interests are very-high-redshift galaxies, which he observed with the Hubble Space Telescope. In 2010 he received the Dutch Spinoza Prize.	JPL · 15168
15169 Wilfriedboland	2629 P-L	Wilfried Boland (born 1953), a Dutch astronomer at Leiden. Having studied in Utrecht, he obtained his PhD on molecular clouds in Amsterdam. After working in the Astron directorate (Dutch radio astronomy), he later became the executive director of the Dutch Research School for Astronomy.	JPL · 15169
15170 Erikdeul	2648 P-L	Erik Deul (born 1958), Dutch astronomer, who, after a career in IT support, returned to Leiden to become Scientific Head of the Informations and Communications Technologies development group.	JPL · 15170
15171 Xandertielens	2772 P-L	Alexander Tielens (born 1953), Dutch astronomer at Leiden who after his PhD went to the US to become Project Scientist for the airborne observatory, SOFIA. Back in the Netherlands he continues his work on dust and the chemistry of interstellar matter.	JPL · 15171
15199 Rodnyanskaya	1974 SE	Larisa Zinov'evna Rodnyanskaya (1938–2004) was secretary of the board of the Ukrainian Filmmakers Union. In 1987 she founded the first independent documentary studio "Contact" and was its permanent director and producer	JPL · 15199

== 15201–15300 ==
back to top

Named minor planet	Provisional	This minor planet was named for...	Ref; Catalog
15202 Yamada-Houkoku	1977 EM_{5}	Yamada-Houkoku (1805–1877) was a Confucian and Japanese scholar of the late Edo period, born in Okayama prefecture	JPL · 15202
15203 Grishanin	1978 SS_{6}	Kirill Vladimirovich Grishanin (1909–2002), an eminent Russian specialist in the field of hydrometeorology, delivered lectures at the St. Petersburg State University for Water Communications for nearly 50 years. He is author of numerous scientific works and some textbooks, one of which was reprinted three times	JPL · 15203
15212 Yaroslavlʹ	1979 WY_{3}	Founded in 1010, Yaroslavlʹ was the capital of an independent principality, incorporated into the Moscow principality in 1463. During the Polish occupation of Moscow in 1612 it was Russia's de facto capital. The historical center of Yaroslavlʹ has been included in the UNESCO list of World Heritage Sites	JPL · 15212
15214 Duart	1981 DY	Duart Castle (Caisteal Dhubhairt), a 13th century castle located on the Isle of Mull in Scotland	JPL · 15214
15215 Lachlanmaclean	1981 EH_{13}	Sir Lachlan Maclean, 12th Baronet (born 1942), 28th Chief of Clan Maclean and veteran of the Scots Guard and the British Army's Special Air Service.	JPL · 15215
15220 Sumerkin	1981 SC_{7}	Yurij Vasil'evich Sumerkin (born 1935) is a Russian scientist in the field of ship mechanical engineering, ship building and ship repair. He is an author of more than 100 scientific and educational works, including eight textbooks on the technology of ship mechanical engineering.	JPL · 15220
15224 Penttilä	1985 JG	Antti Penttilä (born 1977), a postdoctoral researcher at the University of Helsinki. He is a specialist on the scattering and absorption of light by cosmic dust in cometary comae as well as on the surfaces of asteroids and cometary nuclei.	JPL · 15224
15228 Ronmiller	1987 DG	Ron Miller (born 1955), a forester for the Bureau of Indian Affairs.	JPL · 15228
15230 Alona	1987 RF_{1}	Alona (born 1997) is a daughter of Valentina Arkadievna Andreichenko, who performed the reductions for astrometric measurements by the discoverer and served as translator for the Tomsk-Uccle Observational Program.	JPL · 15230
15231 Ehdita	1987 RO_{5}	Edita Stanislavovna Piekha (born 1937), a Russian singer of Polish descent.	JPL · 15231
15238 Hisaohori	1989 CQ	Hisao Hori (born 1968) was born in Niihama City, Ehime prefecture, He is an amateur astronomer and member of Shikoku Astronomical Society. He works for Anan Science Center and observes with its 1.13-meter reflector	JPL · 15238
15239 Stenhammar	1989 CR_{2}	Wilhelm Stenhammar (1871–1927) was a Swedish composer, conductor and pianist. His work includes two piano concertos, two symphonies and several quartets. His Sensommarnätter ("Late Summer Nights", 1900–1904) includes beautiful episodes of quiet gestures that are sprinkled throughout the piece.	JPL · 15239
15246 Kumeta	1989 VS_{1}	Yasutaka Kumeta (born 1965) is a well known Japanese amateur astronomer and keen observer and photographer of comets, nebulae, star clusters and lunar eclipses. He has been a member of the Kuroishi Subaru Association since 1992	JPL · 15246
15248 Hidekazu	1989 WH_{3}	Hidekazu Yamato (born 1956), became interested in astronomy through an event in which he participated at the age of 26. Star-field photography is his personal favorite activity	JPL · 15248
15249 Capodimonte	1989 YB_{5}	Capodimonte is the name of the astronomical observatory near Naples that was inaugurated in early November 1819.	JPL · 15249
15250 Nishiyamahiro	1990 DZ	Hiroshi Nishiyama (born 1962) has been a director of the Baienno Sato Observatory since 1998. He was previously a teacher of earth sciences in a high school. His interests include observations of various galaxies, searching for supernovae and astronomical teaching	JPL · 15250
15252 Yoshiken	1990 OD_{1}	Kenichi Yoshioka (born 1948), a primary school principal. He joined the staff of Geisei Observatory in 2008 and is involved in astronomy education for children.	JPL · 15252
15258 Alfilipenko	1990 RN_{17}	Aleksandr Vasil'evich Filipenko (born 1950), a civil engineer at Khanty-Mansijsk in Siberia.	JPL · 15258
15262 Abderhalden	1990 TG_{4}	Emil Abderhalden (1877–1950), was a Swiss physiologist who lectured at the University of Halle during 1911–1945. He contributed more than 1000 articles to the physiologic chemistry of metabolism, created the basis of modern dietetics, discovered the defensive enzymes against exogenous proteins and promoted social welfare.	JPL · 15262
15263 Erwingroten	1990 TY_{7}	Erwin Groten (born 1935), a pioneer in modern geodesy. For three decades until his retirement in 2003 he served as director of the Institute of Physical Geodesy at the Technical University in Darmstadt. He contributed significantly to the definition of fundamental astronomical and geodetic reference frames.	JPL · 15263
15264 Delbrück	1990 TU_{11}	Max Delbrück (1906–1981), German biologist, joint winner with Salvador Luria and Alfred Hershey of the Nobel Prize for Physiology in 1969.	JPL · 15264
15265 Ernsting	1990 TG_{13}	Walter Ernsting (1920–2005; pen name Clark Darlton), was a German science fiction writer who founded the German Science Fiction Club in 1955. His novels are characterized by his desire for humanity and peace.	JPL · 15265
15267 Kolyma	1990 VX_{4}	The Kolyma, a river in northeastern Siberia, has a total length of 2129 km. It rises in the mountains north of the coast of Okhotsk and the Magadan area. Each winter the river is frozen to a depth of several meters	JPL · 15267
15268 Wendelinefroger	1990 WF_{3}	Wendeline Froger (born 1948) has a beautiful soprano voice and a preference for singing Schubert's Lieder. Educated as a professional singer, she performs regularly at church celebrations, weddings and for select audiences at her residence	JPL · 15268
15273 Ruhmkorff	1991 GQ_{3}	Heinrich Daniel Ruhmkorff (1803–1877) was a German instrument maker and researcher who invented the Ruhmkorff coil, used in many physical experiments where high voltages are needed. The coil was applied for energizing discharge tubes, notably for generating x-rays.	JPL · 15273
15276 Diebel	1991 GA_{10}	John Diebel (born 1943), a lifelong amateur astronomer and telescope enthusiast.	JPL · 15276
15278 Pâquet	1991 PG_{7}	Paul Pâquet (born 1937) has contributed to earth-rotation studies and interpretation of the earth rotation variations in relation to the atmosphere and solar activity. As director of the Royal Observatory of Belgium from 1990 to 2002, he increased the number of scientists and renovated and enlarged the center.	JPL · 15278
15282 Franzmarc	1991 RX_{4}	Franz Marc (1880–1916), a German expressionist painter and graphic artist who created an individual style, especially with animal representations. He invented geometrized and rhythmically arranged image composition. He co-founded the group Der Blaue Reiter in Munich in 1911. The name was suggested by the first discoverer.	JPL · 15282
15294 Underwood	1991 VD_{5}	Lynn Underwood (born 1949), an American building plans examiner of Vail, Arizona, has completed successful and innovative designs of two major extensions to the Jarnac Observatory, thus enabling it to redouble its observations and join in an expanded public observing program with Dean Koenig and "Starizona".	JPL · 15294
15295 Tante Riek	1991 VA_{9}	Helena T. Kuipers-Rietberg ("Tante Riek", 1893–1944) was one of the founders of the Dutch resistance organization "Landelijke organisatie voor hulp aan Onderduikers", which helped to hide Jews and escaped prisoners of war during World War II. She was betrayed and died in the concentration camp Ravensbrück	JPL · 15295
15296 Tantetruus	1992 AS_{2}	Geertruida ("Truus") Wijsmuller-Meijer (1896–1978) was a member of the Dutch resistance who rescued some ten thousand Jewish children before and during WWII and smuggled them to safety. In 1966 she was named Righteous Among the Nations. Name suggested by W. A. Fröger	JPL · 15296
15298 Minde	1992 EB_{13}	Odd Minde, Swedish retired teacher who specialized in chemistry and mathematics.	IAU · 15298
15299 Rådbo	1992 ER_{17}	Marie Rådbo, Swedish astronomer.	IAU · 15299

== 15301–15400 ==
back to top

Named minor planet	Provisional	This minor planet was named for...	Ref; Catalog
15301 Marutesser	1992 SC_{2}	Marianne Ute Esser, a member of the scientific staff of the Astronomisches Rechen-Institut in Heidelberg for more than 30 years.	MPC · 15301
15303 Hatoyamamachi	1992 UJ_{2}	Hatoyamamachi, a town in Saitama within the Tokyo metropolitan area.	JPL · 15303
15304 Wikberg	1992 UX_{4}	Leonard Wikberg III (born 1959), a well-known planetary animator and the creator of extraordinary space images.	JPL · 15304
15308 Ulfdanielsson	1993 FR_{4}	Ulf Danielsson, Swedish professor of theoretical physics at Uppsala University.	IAU · 15308
15309 Bragée	1993 FZ_{7}	Petter Bragée, Swedish film and television director, producer, and screenwriter.	IAU · 15309
15310 Meir	1993 FT_{19}	Jessica Meir, Swedish-American astronaut, marine biologist, and physiologist.	IAU · 15310
15311 Västerberg	1993 FZ_{22}	Anders Västerberg, Swedish retired high-school teacher who specialized in physics and astronomy.	IAU · 15311
15312 Wandt	1993 FH_{27}	Marcus Wandt, Swedish astronaut.	IAU · 15312
15313 Ynnerman	1993 FM_{28}	Anders Ynnerman, Swedish professor of scientific visualization at Linköping University and founder of the Norrköping Visualization Center C.	IAU · 15313
15314 Stenbergwieser	1993 FL_{34}	Gabriella Stenberg Wieser, a Swedish space physicist and Martin Wieser, a Swiss-Swedish instrument scientist, both at the Swedish Institute of Space Physics (IRF).	IAU · 15314
15315 Sundin	1993 FX_{35}	Maria Sundin, Swedish astronomer.	IAU · 15315
15316 Okagakimachi	1993 HH_{1}	Okagakimachi is a small town in Fukuoka Prefecture, west Japan, where the Hokuto Sichisei (the Big Dipper) appears to dip into the Sea of Genkai at lower culmination in the early morning during the summer and autumn.	JPL · 15316
15318 Innsbruck	1993 KX_{1}	Innsbruck, capital of Tyrol in the heart of the Alps on the great route from Italy.	JPL · 15318
15321 Donnadean	1993 PE_{8}	With his wife Donna, Dean Koenig (born 1956) has devoted years to inspiring people to become interested in the night sky. Through observing sessions and other facilities of his store "Starizona", located in Tucson, Arizona, Koenig has a fine record of restoring and repairing telescopes.	JPL · 15321
15329 Sabena	1993 SN_{7}	Sabena, defunct Belgian airline	JPL · 15329
15330 de Almeida	1993 TO	Amaury Augusto de Almeida (born 1946) is a Brazilian astronomer with expertise in cometary science and astrochemistry. His major contributions include studies of gas and dust production in comets and theoretical determination of basic molecular data for simple radicals and ions of astrophysical importance.	JPL · 15330
15332 CERN	1993 TU_{24}	CERN (originally the Conseil européen pour la recherche nucléaire; now the Organisation européenne pour la recherche nucléaire, European Organization for Nuclear Physics), Geneva, Switzerland, the world's largest subatomic particle laboratory.	JPL · 15332
15335 Satoyukie	1993 UV	Yukie Sato (born 1962) is an expert on astronomical photography and one of the most active members of the Ota Astronomical Club.	JPL · 15335
15338 Dufault	1994 AZ_{4}	Michele Dufault (1988–2011), an outstanding astronomy and physics student at Yale College who died in an accident just weeks before graduation.	JPL · 15338
15339 Pierazzo	1994 AA_{9}	Elisabetta Pierazzo (1963–2011) was an expert in impact modeling, in particular of the Chicxulub impact, as well as in modeling the effects of impacts on Earth and Mars.	JPL · 15339
15342 Assisi	1994 GD_{10}	Saint Francis of Assisi	JPL · 15342
15343 Von Wohlgemuth	1994 PB_{1}	Emil Edler Von Wohlgemuth (1843–1896), a leader of the Austro-Hungarian polar expedition of 1882.	IAU · 15343
15346 Bonifatius	1994 RT_{11}	Saint Boniface	JPL · 15346
15347 Colinstuart	1994 UD	Colin Stuart (born 1986) is a British astronomy writer and presenter. He has given public astronomy talks to over 250,000 people in schools and at the Royal Observatory Greenwich, written many popular astronomy articles and space books. In 2014 he was runner up in the European Astronomy Journalism Prize.	JPL · 15347
15350 Naganuma	1994 VB_{2}	Naganuma, Hokkaido.	JPL · 15350
15351 Yamaguchimamoru	1994 VO_{6}	Mamoru Yamaguchi (born 1965), an amateur astronomer in Isahaya City, Nagasaki Prefecture, Japan.	JPL · 15351
15353 Meucci	1994 WA	Antonio Meucci (1808–1889), an inventor of the telephone.	JPL · 15353
15355 Maupassant	1995 AZ_{3}	Guy de Maupassant (1850–1893), a French writer	JPL · 15355
15358 Kintner	1995 FM_{8}	Paul Kintner (1946–2010), professor of electrical and computer engineering at Cornell University.	JPL · 15358
15359 Dressler	1995 GV_{2}	Burkhard Dressler (born 1939), a Canadian geologist.	JPL · 15359
15360 Moncalvo	1996 CY_{7}	Moncalvo is a small town in the Monferrato Hills region of Piedmont, a land of ancient and noble traditions. In addition to its renowned gastronomical specialties, Moncalvo has been a sponsor of cultural-scientific initiatives in astronomy and space exploration	JPL · 15360
15363 Ysaÿe	1996 FT_{6}	Eugène Ysaÿe (1858–1931), a violinist and composer.	JPL · 15363
15364 Kenglover	1996 HT_{2}	Ken Glover (born 1964), a Canadian space historian.	JPL · 15364
15368 Katsuji	1996 JZ	Katsuji Koyama (born 1945), a professor emeritus of Kyoto University, works in x-ray astronomy and cosmic ray physics. In particular, he has investigated the x-ray emission mechanisms and structures of supernova remnants. He was a vice-president of the Astronomical Society of Japan during 1999–2000	JPL · 15368
15370 Kanchi	1996 NW	Kanji Nagao, whose nickname is Kanchi, is the hero in Tokyo Love Story, originally a cartoon written by Fumi Saimon, and broadcast as a TV drama in 1991.	JPL · 15370
15371 Steward	1996 RZ_{18}	Steward Observatory	MPC · 15371
15372 Agrigento	1996 TK_{41}	The Italian city of Agrigento in Sicily. It was founded by the Greeks in 582 B.C. (Akragas) One of the leading cities of the Mediterranean world, it demonstrates still its pride by preserving the remains of several Doric temples. In 490 B.C. the great philosopher Empedocles was born there.	JPL · 15372
15374 Teta	1997 BG	Teta, mythical fortune-teller and heathen priestess, second daughter of Bohemian prince Krok	MPC · 15374
15375 Laetitiafoglia	1997 BO_{9}	Laetitia Foglia (born 2003), the elder daughter of Sergio and Paola Diomede, friends of the discoverers.	JPL · 15375
15376 Marták	1997 CT_{1}	Ján Marták, Slovak musician	MPC · 15376
15378 Artin	1997 PJ_{2}	Emil Artin, an Austrian-German mathematician.	JPL · 15378
15379 Alefranz	1997 QG_{1}	Alessandro Besentini and Francesco Villa, Italian comedian duo, friends of the second discoverer	JPL · 15379
15381 Spadolini	1997 RB_{1}	Mauro (1941) and Barbara (1944) Spadolini, dedicated Italian secondary-school teachers who believe in cross-curricular work.	MPC · 15381
15382 Vian	1997 SN	Boris Vian (1920–1959), French writer (L´ecume des jours, L´arrache-coeur), singer (Le déserteur) and jazz musician.	JPL · 15382
15384 Samková	1997 SC_{4}	Filomena Samková, Czech	MPC · 15384
15385 Dallolmo	1997 SP_{4}	Umberto Dall'Olmo (1925–1980) was an Italian amateur astronomer with degrees in both law and physics, who principally observed Jupiter and studied flare stars with Rosino. He was also interested in the history of astronomy and worked as a technician at the University of Bologna's Institute of Astronomy.	JPL · 15385
15386 Nicolini	1997 ST_{4}	Martino Nicolini, a nuclear engineer, is very active in amateur astronomy.	JPL · 15386
15387 Hanazukayama	1997 SQ_{17}	Hanazukayama is a 918-m mountain situated along the border between Kawamata town and Iitate village in Fukushima prefecture. It is officially recognized as the most northerly mountain from which Mt. Fuji is visible: 308 km away.	JPL · 15387
15388 Coelum	1997 ST_{17}	Coelum, the Italian astronomy journal. Established in 1931 by Guido Horn d´Arturo, it was edited by the department of astronomy of the University of Bologna and had more than 4000 subscribers. The magazine ceased publications in 1986. The citation was prepared by F. Bonoli.	JPL · 15388
15389 Geflorsch	1997 TL_{6}	Gérard Florsch, one of the founders of the Groupe de Lorraine of the Société Astronomique de France and of the public observatory of Sarreguemines.	MPC · 15389
15390 Znojil	1997 TJ_{10}	Vladimír Znojil, Czech astronomer	MPC · 15390
15391 Steliomancinelli	1997 TS_{16}	Stelio Mancinelli Degli Esposti (1931–2017) was a professor of chemistry in Terni. Deeply keen on mathematics, physics and astronomy, he designed and implemented large sundials in various Italian cities. He was well known for giving lectures about the history of astronomy and for training courses for teachers.	JPL · 15391
15392 Budějický	1997 TO_{19}	Jaromír Budějický, Czech radio-astronomer	MPC · 15392
15395 Rükl	1997 UV	Antonín Rükl, Czech astronomer	MPC · 15395
15396 Howardmoore	1997 UG_{2}	Howard Moore (born 1943) of Chino Valley, Arizona, is an amateur astronomer and accomplished optician who made the 0.25-m telescope with which this minor planet was discovered.	JPL · 15396
15397 Ksoari	1997 UK_{7}	KSO-ARI Minor Planet Surveys (†) were conducted by Freimut Börngen (Karl Schwarzschild Observatory, Tautenburg) and Lutz D. Schmadel (Astronomisches Rechen-Institut, Heidelberg) with the Tautenburg Schmidt Telescope between 1990 and 1993. The surveys resulted in the discovery of 501 minor planets.	MPC · 15397
15399 Hudec	1997 VE	René Hudec, Czech astronomer	MPC · 15399

== 15401–15500 ==
back to top

Named minor planet	Provisional	This minor planet was named for...	Ref; Catalog
15402 Suzaku	1997 VY_{5}	Suzaku, an imaginary vermilion bird that guards the south of Kyoto.	JPL · 15402
15403 Mérignac	1997 VH_{6}	Merignac, the city in southwestern France.	JPL · 15403
15406 Bleibtreu	1997 WV_{12}	Hermann Karl Bleibtreu (born 1933), professor emeritus of anthropology at the University of Arizona.	JPL · 15406
15407 Udakiyoo	1997 WM_{16}	Kiyoo Uda (1959–2009) was a potter at Shigaraki-ware and an amateur astronomer. He observed meteors, variable stars and occultations enthusiastically and made great contributions to astronomical popularization in Shiga prefecture	JPL · 15407
15412 Schaefer	1998 AU_{3}	John P. Schaefer (born 1934), founder, in association with Ansel Adams, of the Center for Creative Photography of the University of Arizona.	JPL · 15412
15413 Beaglehole	1998 BX_{9}	J.C. Beaglehole (1901–1971), a New Zealand historian and authority on the European exploration of the Pacific.	JPL · 15413
15414 Pettirossi	1998 BC_{35}	Silvio Pettirossi (1887–1917), a Paraguayan aviation pioneer and first president of the Aeroclub del Paraguay.	JPL · 15414
15415 Rika	1998 CA_{1}	Rika Akana, girlfriend of Kanchi, is the heroine in Tokyo Love Story. Some stories of the TV drama were filmed on location in Kuma Town, where this minor planet was discovered.	JPL · 15415
15417 Babylon	1998 DH_{34}	Babylon, one of the most famous cities of antiquity, was the capital of southern Mesopotamia, the region between the Tigris and Euphrates rivers.	JPL · 15417
15418 Sergiospinelli	1998 DU_{35}	Sergio Spinelli (born 1939), a very active volunteer promoting both music and astronomy in Italy.	JPL · 15418
15420 Aedouglass	1998 HQ_{31}	A. E. Douglass (1867–1962) was an American astronomer and developer of dendochronology. For Percival Lowell, he sited Lowell Observatory. Later he directed the Steward Observatory at the University of Arizona and in 1923 dedicated the 0.9-m telescope, which became the Spacewatch telescope in 1983.	JPL · 15420
15421 Adammalin	1998 HM_{81}	Adam Mikah Malin, 2003 Intel STS finalist.	MPC · 15421
15425 Welzl	1998 SV_{26}	Jan Welzl, Czech arctic explorer	MPC · 15425
15427 Shabas	1998 SP_{61}	Natalia Leonydivna Shabas (1969–2003), a Ukrainian astronomer at Kyiv Shevchenko National University.	JPL · 15427
15434 Mittal	1998 VM_{25}	Alexander Chow Mittal, 2003 Intel STS finalist.	MPC · 15434
15436 Dexius	1998 VU_{30}	Dexius was the father of Iphinous.	IAU · 15436
15438 Joegotobed	1998 WF_{1}	Joseph Gotobed, network operations manager for the Lunar and Planetary Lab at the University of Arizona.	JPL · 15438
15440 Eioneus	1998 WX_{4}	Eioneus, from Greek mythology. He was killed by a spear from Hector.	IAU · 15440
15448 Siegwarth	1998 XT_{21}	James David Siegwarth (born 1934), a physicist at the National Institute of Standards and Technology in Boulder.	JPL · 15448
15452 Ibramohammed	1998 XL_{52}	Ibraheem Maqsood Mohammed, 2003 Intel STS finalist.	MPC · 15452
15453 Brasileirinhos	1998 XD_{96}	Brasileirinhos ("Young Brazilians") was chosen by the winners of the third Grande Desafío organized by the Museu Exploratorio de Ciencias of the Universidade Estadual de Campinas to encourage all Brazilian students in their efforts to achieve the necessary goals in their studies	JPL · 15453
15460 Manca	1998 YD_{10}	Francesco Manca, Italian amateur astronomer	MPC · 15460
15461 Johnbird	1998 YT_{29}	John M. Bird (born 1931) is a professor of geology at Cornell University. He is a pioneer in the geological interpretation of plate-tectonic motions and of deep-earth mineralogy. The name was suggested by P. C. Thomas.	JPL · 15461
15462 Stumegan	1999 AV_{1}	Stewart A. Megan (born 1952) discovered the Near Earth Object 2004 BV18 in conjunction with the Spacewatch Fast-Moving-Object Project. This find, made using real-time images transferred to volunteers over the Internet, encouraged others to join the online search.	JPL · 15462
15465 Buchroeder	1999 AZ_{5}	Richard Alfred Buchroeder (born 1941) is an American designer of decentered and other innovative optical systems, including those for astronomical telescopes. Three wide-field correctors used on the Spacewatch telescopes are of his design.†	JPL · 15465
15466 Barlow	1999 AR_{23}	Nadine G. Barlow (born 1958), a planetary geoscientist at Northern Arizona University, studies planetary surface feature geology.	JPL · 15466
15467 Aflorsch	1999 AN_{24}	Alphonse Florsch (1930–2015) a French astronomer who was the director of the Observatoire de Strasbourg for many years. A specialist in radial velocities in the Small Magellanic Cloud, he was also secretary of the Groupe d´Alsace of the Société Astronomique de France for 20 years. Now retired, he still continues to teach astronomy in schools (Src).	JPL · 15467
15468 Mondriaan	1999 AT_{31}	Pieter C. Mondriaan (1872–1944), a Dutch Neo-plasticist painter	JPL · 15468
15469 Ohmura	1999 BC	Tsutomu Ohmura (born 1965), a computer engineer and amateur astronomer.	JPL · 15469
15476 Narendra	1999 BW_{24}	Varun Kumar Narendra, 2003 Intel STS finalist.	MPC · 15476
15492 Nyberg	1999 CG_{89}	Michael Herbert Nyberg, 2003 Intel STS finalist.	MPC · 15492
15494 Lucylake	1999 CX_{123}	Lucy Annabelle Lake (b. 2000) was awarded second place in the 2019 Intel International Science and Engineering Fair for her engineering mechanics project. She attended the Barker College, Sydney, New South Wales, Australia.	IAU · 15494
15495 Bogie	1999 DF_{2}	Humphrey Bogart (1899–1957), an American actor who appeared on Broadway and was the star of many a Hollywood film. Often cast in the tough-guy role, Bogart won the Academy Award for best actor in 1951 and was voted male star of the twentieth century by the American Film Institute in 1999	JPL · 15495
15497 Lucca	1999 DE_{7}	Lucca, the ancient city on the banks of the river Serchio, in Tuscany.	JPL · 15497
15499 Cloyd	1999 FY_{8}	Marshall P. Cloyd (born 1939), a businessman and philanthropist, has provided assistance to organizations in the U.S. and U.K. to preserve historical items and artifacts, and he has encouraged public exhibitions for naval, aeronautic and space programs. The name was suggested by E. K. Gibson and F. Vilas.	JPL · 15499
15500 Anantpatel	1999 FO_{26}	Anant Ramesh Patel, 2003 Intel STS finalist.	MPC · 15500

== 15501–15600 ==
back to top

Named minor planet	Provisional	This minor planet was named for...	Ref; Catalog
15501 Pepawlowski	1999 NK_{10}	Peter Michal Pawlowski, 2003 Intel STS finalist.	MPC · 15501
15502 Hypeirochus	1999 NV_{27}	Hypeirochus, son of King Priam, and killed by Odysseus.	IAU · 15502
15503 Estradioto	1999 RD_{25}	Juliana Davoglio Estradioto (b. 2000) was awarded first place in the 2019 Intel International Science and Engineering Fair for her materials science project. She attended the IFRS Ciencia e Tecnologia, Osorio, Rio Grande do Sul, Brazil.	IAU · 15503
15506 Preygel	1999 RX_{132}	Anatoly Preygel, 2003 Intel STS finalist.	MPC · 15506
15507 Rengarajan	1999 RC_{166}	Michelle Rengarajan, 2003 Intel STS finalist.	MPC · 15507
15509 Annejing	1999 TX_{113}	Anne Jing (b. 2001) was awarded first place in the 2019 Intel International Science and Engineering Fair for her biomedical engineering project. She attended the Assumption College School, Brantford, Canada.	IAU · 15509
15510 Phoeberounds	1999 TF_{127}	Phoebe Robeson Rounds, 2003 Intel STS finalist.	MPC · 15510
15512 Snyder	1999 UK_{1}	Doug Snyder, an American amateur astronomer whose untiring work has reduced or prevented much light pollution in southern Arizona, and his educational efforts have introduced many to astronomy. He co-discovered Comet C/2002 E2 (Snyder-Murakami).	JPL · 15512
15513 Emmermann	1999 UV_{38}	Axel Emmermann (born 1953), a Belgian amateur geologist who was the only person to alert U.S. authorities of an international e-mail sale offering of lunar material. His actions resulted in the recovery of stolen Apollo lunar rock samples and the arrest and conviction of four individuals for the theft (see Sex on the Moon). The name was suggested by E. K. Gibson.	JPL · 15513
15516 Langleben	1999 VN_{86}	Ian Langleben (b. 2000) was awarded second place in the 2019 Intel International Science and Engineering Fair for his systems software team project. He attended the Dawson College, Westmount, Quebec, Canada.	IAU · 15516
15522 Trueblood	1999 XX_{136}	Mark Trueblood, American engineer and amateur astronomer.	JPL · 15522
15523 Grenville	1999 XE_{151}	Grenville Turner, a geochronologist and meteoriticist.	JPL · 15523
15526 Kokura	1999 XH_{229}	Kokura high school is in Kitakyushu City, Fukuoka Prefecture, Japan.	JPL · 15526
15528 Martinsmedina	2000 AJ_{10}	Liana Martins-Medina (b. 2000) was awarded second place in the 2019 Intel International Science and Engineering Fair for her systems software team project. She attended the Marianopolis College, Westmount, Quebec, Canada.	IAU · 15528
15530 Kuber	2000 AV_{98}	Catharine M. Kuber, 2001 DYSC finalist.	JPL · 15530
15531 Matusch	2000 AV_{99}	Brendon Franz Matusch (b. 2003) was awarded second place in the 2019 Intel International Science and Engineering Fair for his physics and astronomy project. He attended the Lo-Ellen Park Secondary School, Sudbury, Ontario, Canada.	IAU · 15531
15533 Saturnino	2000 AP_{138}	Joseph Carmelo Saturnino (b. 2003) was awarded second place in the 2019 Intel International Science and Engineering Fair for his robotics and intelligent machines project. He attended the Bishop Ryan Catholic Secondary School, Hannon, Ontario, Canada.	IAU · 15533
15543 Elizateel	2000 DD_{96}	Elizabeth A. Teel, 2001 DYSC finalist.	JPL · 15543
15544 Hushicheng	2000 EG_{17}	Hu Shicheng (b. 2001) was awarded best of category and first place in the 2019 Intel ISEF for her energy project. She also received the Dudley R. Herschbach SIYSS Award. She attended the Shanghai Foreign Language School Affiliated to SISU, Shanghai, China.	IAU · 15544
15546 Sunyufeng	2000 EZ_{75}	Sun Yufeng (b. 2002) was awarded second place in the 2019 Intel International Science and Engineering Fair for his systems software project. He attended the Experimental High School Attached to Beijing Normal University, Beijing, China.	IAU · 15546
15547 Xujiping	2000 ET_{91}	Xu Jiping Bradley (b. 2002) was awarded second place in the 2019 Intel International Science and Engineering Fair for his robotics and intelligent machines project. He attended the Shanghai American School - Pudong Campus, Shanghai, China.	IAU · 15547
15548 Kalinowski	2000 EJ_{147}	Larry Kalinowski (1930–2007), a long time amateur astronomer with the Warren Astronomical Society of Detroit, Michigan, United States.	JPL · 15548
15550 Sydney	2000 FR_{10}	Australia's largest city, Sydney is also the birthplace of the discoverer of this minor planet.	JPL · 15550
15551 Paddock	2000 FQ_{25}	George (born 1918) and Courtney (born 1914) Paddock have retained a decades-long, educated interest in astronomy, planetary sciences and both human and robotic exploration of space.	JPL · 15551
15552 Sandashounkan	2000 FO_{26}	Sandashounkan high school is in Sanda City, Hyoko Prefecture, Japan.	JPL · 15552
15553 Carachang	2000 FG_{45}	Cara A. Chang, 2001 DYSC finalist.	JPL · 15553
15554 Chenhuaipu	2000 FH_{46}	Chen Huai-Pu (b. 2002) was awarded second place in the 2019 Intel International Science and Engineering Fair for his engineering mechanics project. He attended the Keelung Municipal Anle Senior High School, Keelung City, Chinese Taipei.	IAU · 15554
15555 Luochihi	2000 FD_{49}	Luo Chih-I (b. 2001) was awarded second place in the 2019 Intel International Science and Engineering Fair for his energy project. He attended the Taipei Fuhsing Private School, Taipei, Chinese Taipei.	IAU · 15555
15556 Hanafy	2000 FW_{49}	Abdel Rahman Mohamed Hanafy (b. 2001) was awarded second place in the 2019 Intel International Science and Engineering Fair for his environmental engineering team project. He attended the STEM School of Alexandria, Alexandria, Egypt.	IAU · 15556
15557 Kimcochran	2000 GV	While working for the Spacewatch Project, Kim Cochran (born 1977) showed exceptional talent and creativity at applying new computer technologies during the design and construction of upgraded cameras for the Spacewatch 0.9-m and 1.8-m telescopes.	JPL · 15557
15559 Abigailhines	2000 GR_{23}	Abigail M. Hines, 2001 DYSC finalist.	JPL · 15559
15563 Remsberg	2000 GG_{48}	Jarrett R. Remsberg, 2001 DYSC finalist.	JPL · 15563
15564 Lateef	2000 GU_{48}	Salma Fawzy Lateef (b. 2000) was awarded second place in the 2019 Intel International Science and Engineering Fair for her environmental engineering team project. She attended the STEM School of Alexandria, Alexandria, Egypt.	IAU · 15564
15565 Benjaminsteele	2000 GM_{49}	Benjamin C. Steele, 2001 DYSC finalist.	JPL · 15565
15566 Elizabethbaker	2000 GD_{50}	Elizabeth A. Baker, 2001 DYSC finalist.	JPL · 15566
15567 Giacomelli	2000 GF_{53}	Hillary N. Giacomelli, 2001 DYSC finalist.	JPL · 15567
15568 Jathe	2000 GP_{54}	Adrien Chen-Wei Jathe (b. 2001) was awarded best of category, first place, and the Dudley R. Herschbach SIYSS Award in the 2019 Intel ISEF for his materials science project. He attended the Metropolitan School Frankfurt, Germany.	IAU · 15568
15569 Feinberg	2000 GC_{60}	Rebecca M. Feinberg, 2001 DYSC finalist.	JPL · 15569
15570 von Wolff	2000 GT_{60}	Max von Wolff (b. 1999) was awarded best of category and first place in the 2019 Intel International Science and Engineering Fair for his embedded systems project. He attended the Megina Gymnasium Mayen, Mayen, Germany	IAU · 15570
15573 Richardjoseph	2000 GX_{65}	Richard Joseph (b. 2002) was awarded second place in the 2019 Intel International Science and Engineering Fair for his plant sciences team project. He attended the Kendriya Vidyalaya No.1 Naval Base Kochi, Kerala, India.	IAU · 15573
15574 Stephaniehass	2000 GF_{66}	Stephanie A. Hass, 2001 DYSC finalist.	JPL · 15574
15575 Manyakumar	2000 GC_{68}	Manya M. Kumar (b. 2001) was awarded second place in the 2019 Intel International Science and Engineering Fair for her plant sciences team project. She attended the Kendriya Vidyalaya No.1 Naval Base Kochi, Kerala, India.	IAU · 15575
15576 Munday	2000 GK_{68}	Emily S. Munday, 2001 DYSC finalist.	JPL · 15576
15577 Gywilliams	2000 GN_{68}	Genevieve Y. Williams, 2001 DYSC finalist.	JPL · 15577
15578 Bagnall	2000 GW_{69}	Dylan Andrew Bagnall (b. 2001) was awarded best of category and first place in the 2019 Intel International Science and Engineering Fair for his animal sciences team project. He attended the King's Hospital School, Dublin, Leinster, Ireland.	IAU · 15578
15579 Richardbeattie	2000 GP_{70}	Richard Douglas Beattie (b. 2001) was awarded best of category and first place in the 2019 Intel International Science and Engineering Fair for his animal sciences team project. He attended the King's Hospital School, Dublin, Leinster, Ireland.	IAU · 15579
15581 Adamkelly	2000 GV_{72}	Adam Kelly (b. 2001) was awarded best of category and first place in the 2019 Intel ISEF for his systems software project. He also received the Dudley R.Herschbach SIYSS Award. He attended the Skerries Community College, Dublin, Ireland.	IAU · 15581
15582 Russellburrows	2000 GZ_{73}	Russell T. Burrows, 2001 DYSC finalist.	JPL · 15582
15583 Hanick	2000 GM_{74}	Andrea L. Hanick, 2001 DYSC finalist.	JPL · 15583
15584 Yumaokamoto	2000 GO_{74}	Yuma Okamoto (b. 2001) was awarded second place in the 2019 Intel International Science and Engineering Fair for his animal sciences team project. He attended the Shizuoka Prefectural Kakegawa-Nishi High School, Kakegawa City, Shizuoka Prefecture, Japan.	IAU · 15584
15587 Sotsukamoto	2000 GK_{76}	So Tsukamoto (b. 2002) was awarded second place in the 2019 Intel International Science and Engineering Fair for his animal sciences team project. He attended the Shizuoka Prefectural Kakegawa-Nishi High School, Kakegawa city, Shizuoka Prefecture, Japan.	IAU · 15587
15594 Castillo	2000 GG_{95}	Jesse L. Castillo, 2001 DYSC finalist.	JPL · 15594
15595 Melwincheng	2000 GX_{95}	Melwin Choon Lei Cheng (b. 2003) was awarded first place in the 2019 Intel International Science and Engineering Fair for his chemistry team project. He attended the Chung Ling High School Penang, Georgetown, Malaysia.	IAU · 15595
15596 Yongshiangtham	2000 GZ_{95}	Yong Shiang Tham (b. 2003) was awarded first place in the 2019 Intel International Science and Engineering Fair for his chemistry team project. He attended the Chung Ling High School Penang, Georgetown, Malaysia.	IAU · 15596
15597 Piotrlazarek	2000 GM_{96}	Piotr Lazarek (b. 2001) was awarded first place in the 2019 Intel International Science and Engineering Fair for his environmental engineering project. He attended the Zespol Szkol Filomata, Gliwice, Slask, Poland.	IAU · 15597
15598 Kazantsev	2000 GP_{96}	Daniil Kazantsev (b. 2002) was awarded second place in the 2019 Intel International Science and Engineering Fair for his systems software project. He attended the Municipal Lyceum #12, Ekaterinburg, Russia.	IAU · 15598
15599 Richardlarson	2000 GF_{99}	Richard W. Larson, 2001 DYSC finalist.	JPL · 15599

== 15601–15700 ==
back to top

Named minor planet	Provisional	This minor planet was named for...	Ref; Catalog
15603 Kimyoonji	2000 GG_{108}	Kim Yoonji (b. 2001) was awarded second place in the 2019 Intel International Science and Engineering Fair for her plant sciences team project. She attended the Kangwon Science High School, Wonju, South Korea.	IAU · 15603
15604 Fruits	2000 GT_{108}	Benjamin R. Fruits, 2001 DYSC finalist.	JPL · 15604
15606 Winer	2000 GU_{122}	Irvin M. Winer (1935–1982), a physicist, teacher and mentor.	JPL · 15606
15608 Owens	2000 GK_{124}	Alexander C. Owens, 2001 DYSC finalist.	JPL · 15608
15609 Kosmaczewski	2000 GP_{124}	Named in 2002 after Sara Kosmaczewski, a Hamden student, after she won the third annual Discovery Young Scientist Challenge, a national science contest.	MPC · 15609
15611 Leejoonyoung	2000 GD_{127}	Lee Joonyoung (b. 2001) was awarded best of category and first place in the 2019 Intel International Science and Engineering Fair for his energy team project. He attended the Korea Science Academy of KAIST, Busan, South Korea.	IAU · 15611
15612 Parkmincheol	2000 GV_{133}	Park Mincheol (b. 2001) was awarded best of category and first place in the 2019 Intel International Science and Engineering Fair for his energy team project. He attended the Korea Science Academy of KAIST, Busan, South Korea.	IAU · 15612
15613 Rajihyun	2000 GH_{136}	Ra Jihyun (b. 2001) was awarded second place in the 2019 Intel International Science and Engineering Fair for her plant sciences team project. She attended the Kangwon Science High School, Wonju, South Korea.	IAU · 15613
15614 Pillinger	2000 GA_{143}	Colin T. Pillinger (born 1943), a planetary geochemist.	JPL · 15614
15617 Fallowfield	2000 HK_{10}	Heather L. Fallowfield, 2001 DYSC finalist.	JPL · 15617
15618 Lorifritz	2000 HF_{11}	Lori A. Fritz, 2001 DYSC finalist.	JPL · 15618
15619 Albertwu	2000 HE_{13}	Albert Y. Wu, 2001 DYSC finalist.	JPL · 15619
15620 Beltrami	2000 HQ_{14}	Eugenio Beltrami (1835–1900), an Italian mathematician.	JPL · 15620
15621 Erikhovland	2000 HO_{20}	Erik Hovland (born 1970), a computer programmer at the Jet Propulsion Laboratory.	JPL · 15621
15622 Westrich	2000 HY_{20}	Bradford J. Westrich, 2001 DYSC finalist.	JPL · 15622
15623 Maitaneam	2000 HU_{30}	Maitane Alonso Monasterio (b. 2001) was awarded second place in the 2019 Intel International Science and Engineering Fair for her microbiology project. She attended the Avellaneda Ikastetxea, Sodupe, Spain.	IAU · 15623
15624 Lamberton	2000 HB_{31}	Melissa L. Lamberton, 2001 DYSC finalist.	JPL · 15624
15625 Agrawal	2000 HB_{35}	Malhaar Agrawal (b. 2002) was awarded first place in the 2019 Intel International Science and Engineering Fair for his biomedical and health sciences project. He attended the Horace Mann School, Bronx, New York, U.S.A.	IAU · 15625
15627 Hong	2000 HW_{52}	Danny Hong, 2001 DYSC finalist.	JPL · 15627
15628 Gonzales	2000 HA_{53}	Eric A. Gonzales, 2001 DYSC finalist.	JPL · 15628
15629 Sriner	2000 HK_{53}	Kimberly A. Sriner, 2001 DYSC finalist.	JPL · 15629
15630 Disanti	2000 HT_{56}	Michael A. DiSanti (born 1954) has advanced the understanding of molecular processing and chemistry in comets, in particular of carbon monoxide and oxygen-processing mechanisms, through his studies at the Goddard Space Flight Center.	JPL · 15630
15631 Dellorusso	2000 HT_{57}	Neil Dello Russo (born 1966) has advanced the understanding of molecular processing and chemistry in comets, in particular of ethane and water, through his studies at the Catholic University of America and Goddard Space Flight Center.	JPL · 15631
15632 Magee-Sauer	2000 HU_{70}	Karen P. Magee-Sauer (born 1961), an American astronomer who has advanced the understanding of the chemistry of HCN and acetylene in comets through her studies at Rowan University.	JPL · 15632
15634 Ahluwalia	2000 JD_{15}	Rohan Ahluwalia (b. 2002) was awarded second place in the 2019 Intel International Science and Engineering Fair for his biomedical engineering project. He attended the Westview High School, Portland, Oregon, U.S.A.	IAU · 15634
15635 Andrewhager	2000 JV_{27}	Andrew T. Hager, 2001 DYSC finalist.	JPL · 15635
15651 Tlepolemos	9612 P-L	Tlepolemos, king of Rhodes, son of Heracles and was one of the first kings to join the army against Troy.	JPL · 15651
15663 Periphas	4168 T-2	The Greek hero Periphas from Aetolia was killed by the god Ares. Ares tried to get the armor of Periphas, but Diomedes wounded Ares, with the help of Pallas Athene.	JPL · 15663
15669 Pshenichner	1974 ST_{1}	Boris Grigor'evich Pshenichner (born 1933) dealt with space education for 50 years. Since 1958 he worked in the Moscow planetarium, and since 1962 in the Moscow palace for children's creativity. A member of the Russian space academy, he is head of the Moscow scientific-educational program "Experiment in Space"	JPL · 15669
15671 Suzannedébarbat	1977 EP_{6}	Suzanne Débarbat (1928-2024), an astronomer of the Observatory of the Paris. She contributed to the development of the Danjon-Astrolabe and wrote La méthode des hauteurs égales en astronomie. She was the president of IAU Commission 41 from 1991 to 1994 (IAU).	JPL · 15671
15672 Sato-Norio	1977 EX_{7}	Sato-Norio (Norio Sato, 1865–1942), a Japanese educator in the Meiji period, was born in Okayama prefecture.	JPL · 15672
15673 Chetaev	1978 PV_{2}	Nikolaj Gur'evich Chetaev (1902–1959), a Soviet mathematician and mechanician and a professor at the universities in Kazan and Moscow.	JPL · 15673
15674 Elfving	1978 RR_{7}	Ulf Elfving (born 1942), a Swedish journalist and broadcaster who received the Stora Journalistpriset (Swedish Grand Prize for Journalism) in 1989.	IAU · 15674
15675 Goloseevo	1978 SP_{5}	The Goloseevo district in Kiev where the Main Astronomical Observatory of the Ukrainian National Academy of Sciences is located.	JPL · 15675
15676 Almoisheev	1978 TQ_{5}	Alexandr Alexandrovich Moisheev (born 1943) was a designer of the space observatory ASTRON that successfully operated during 1983–1989. As deputy designer general of the Lavochkin Association he significantly contributed to the implementation of a series of Soviet and Russian space missions to Mars and Venus	JPL · 15676
15691 Maslov	1982 TF_{1}	Vladimir Anatol'evich Maslov (born 1965), an engineer in Simferopol and an inventor in the area of storage and transport of oil, is a friend of the discoverer's family.	JPL · 15691
15695 Fedorshpig	1985 RJ_{5}	Fedor Ivanovich Shpig (born 1955), a qualified specialist in economical sciences, is the president of the amateur football association in Ukraine. He promotes the development of sport and a healthy life-style among teenagers in Ukraine.	JPL · 15695
15699 Lyytinen	1986 VM_{6}	Esko Lyytinen (born 1942), a Finnish amateur astronomer.	JPL · 15699

== 15701–15800 ==
back to top

Named minor planet	Provisional	This minor planet was named for...	Ref; Catalog
15702 Olegkotov	1987 RN_{3}	Oleg Kotov (born 1965), a Russian cosmonaut and physician. He took part in training the crews for the space station Mir.	JPL · 15702
15703 Yrjölä	1987 SU_{1}	Ilkka Yrjölä (born 1959), a long-term dedicated amateur astronomer in Kuusankoski, Finland	JPL · 15703
15705 Hautot	1988 AH_{5}	Antoine Hautot (1909–1998) was the discoverer's physics professor at the University of Liège. He did seminal work on the study of the photographic process and on the foundations of subatomic physics. The name was suggested by C. Sterken	JPL · 15705
15708 Metsoc	1988 RB_{12}	Since its establishment in 1933, the Meteoritical Society has united meteorite scientists from around the world.	IAU · 15708
15710 Böcklin	1989 AV_{6}	Arnold Böcklin (1827–1901), a Swiss painter	JPL · 15710
15715 Osuginaoki	1989 UN_{1}	Osugi Naoki, Japanese amateur astronomer.	IAU · 15715
15716 Narahara	1989 WY_{1}	Hiroshi Narahara, Japanese coach for the Chunichi Dragons baseball team, and a friend of the first discoverer.	JPL · 15716
15718 Imokawa	1990 BB_{2}	Satoshi Imokawa (born 1965) is an astronomy instructor at the public astronomical observatory Hoshino Bunkakan in Yame city, Fukuoka prefecture. His main interests are observing comets, nebulae, star clusters and solar eclipse.	JPL · 15718
15723 Girraween	1990 SA_{2}	Girraween National Park, Queensland, Australia.	JPL · 15723
15724 Zille	1990 TW_{3}	Heinrich Zille (1858–1929), graphic artist and photographer.	JPL · 15724
15727 Ianmorison	1990 TO_{9}	Ian Morison (1943–2024), a radio astronomer at the University of Manchester's Jodrell Bank Observatory.	JPL · 15727
15728 Karlmay	1990 TG_{11}	Karl May (1842–1912), Saxonian author of splendid fantasies.	JPL · 15728
15729 Yumikoitahana	1990 UB	Yumiko Itahana (born 1965), who worked together with Japanese astronomer Atsushi Takahashi (first discoverer), and greatly influenced his astronomical career.	JPL · 15729
15732 Vitusbering	1990 VZ_{5}	Vitus Bering, Danish-born Russian navigator and explorer	JPL · 15732
15735 Andakerkhoven	1990 WF_{2}	Melisande Kerkhoven (1919–1945), a Dutch medical student at Groningen University, active in the Dutch Resistance during World War II	JPL · 15735
15736 Hamanasu	1990 XN	Hamanasu, the name of a Japanese rose, is also the name of a sleeper train that connects Aomori and Sapporo (a 480-km distance) in 7.5 hours. Hamanasu is the only sleeper express train that passes through Seikan, the longest tunnel in the world. The train will be retired in the spring of 2016.	JPL · 15736
15739 Matsukuma	1991 ER	Takehiko Matsukuma (1890–1950), an astronomer.	JPL · 15739
15740 Hyakumangoku	1991 EG_{1}	Japanese for the « one million koku domain », the nickname of the wealthy Kaga han (Kaga Province) in the Edo period	JPL · 15740
15742 Laurabassi	1991 LB_{4}	Laura Bassi (1711–1778) was the first woman to receive a philosophical degree in physics at a European university (Bologna). Not allowed to teach, she gave lectures on physics and performed experimental demonstrations, based on Newton's Principia, at her home. Name suggested by K. Leterme.	JPL · 15742
15745 Yuliya	1991 PM_{5}	Yuliya Germanova (born 1986), studied English and Chinese at the Ural University in Chelyabinsk. During the 2013 "First International Conference on the Chelyabinsk/Chebarkul Meteor/Meteorite", she did live Russian translations of the discoverer's talk, as well as live English translations of Russian talks.	JPL · 15745
15752 Eluard	1992 BD_{2}	Paul Éluard, 20th-century French surrealist poet.	JPL · 15752
15753 Rathsman	1992 DD_{10}	Anna Rathsman (b. 1960) and Peter Rathsman (b. 1957) are Swedish engineers in the space industry, primarily at the Swedish Space Corporation.	IAU · 15753
15760 Albion	1992 QB_{1}	Albion is the island-dwelling primordial man who divided himself into the Four Zoas (Urthona, Urizen, Luvah and Tharmas), in the creation mythology of William Blake (1757–1827). Each Zoa represents important aspects of human character.	JPL · 15760
15761 Schumi	1992 SM_{16}	Seven-time Formula One World Champion Michael Schumacher.	JPL · 15761
15762 Rühmann	1992 SR_{24}	Heinz Rühmann, German actor.	JPL · 15762
15763 Nagakubo	1992 UO_{5}	Nagakubo Sekisui (1717–1801), a Japanese geographer and Confucian scholar.	JPL · 15763
15766 Strahlenberg	1993 BD_{13}	Philip Johan von Strahlenberg, Swedish officer and geographer	JPL · 15766
15779 Scottroberts	1993 OA_{3}	Scott Roberts (born 1959) for many years has encouraged amateur astronomers to pursue their love of the night sky, spending much time teaching people how to use and enjoy their telescopes.	JPL · 15779
15783 Briancox	1993 PZ_{2}	Brian Edward Cox (born 1968), an English particle physicist.	JPL · 15783
15785 de Villegas	1993 QO_{3}	Esteban Manuel de Villegas (1585–1669), a Spanish poet, became famous for his lyrical work Las Eréoticas (1618), setting with its purely formal poetry a precedent for neoclassism. The naming honors also Jean-Baptiste de Villegas (1721–1806), a member of the Gezelschap van den Heiligen Bloede in Bruges	JPL · 15785
15786 Hoshioka	1993 RS	Hoshioka is a kindergarten founded in 1978 by the Matsuyama Gakuen Educational Corporation in Matsuyama City, Ehime Prefecture. || IAU · 15786	
15790 Keizan	1993 TC	Keizan Zenji (1268–1325), a Japanese priest who practiced asceticism at the Eiheiji Temple in Fukui prefecture. He contributed to the spread of Zen Buddhism by founding several temples including the Sojiji Temple in 1321.	JPL · 15790
15791 Yoshiewatanabe	1993 TM_{1}	Yoshie Watanabe (born 1963) is a Japanese writer for popular Japanese astronomy magazines. She has published, with her husband Junichi, several popular books on astronomy and general science.	JPL · 15791
15797 Tachikoutenkibu	1993 UD_{3}	Tachikoutenkibu is the commonly-used Japanese name for the Astronomy and Meteorology Club of Tachikawa High School, Tokyo, established in 1943.	IAU · 15797

== 15801–15900 ==
back to top

Named minor planet	Provisional	This minor planet was named for...	Ref; Catalog
15803 Parisi	1994 CW	Giorgio Parisi (born 1948), an Italian theoretical physicist, who was awareded with the 2021 Nobel Prize in Physics "for the discovery of the interplay of disorder and fluctuations in physical systems from atomic to planetary scales".	IAU · 15803
15804 Yenisei	1994 EY_{5}	Yenisei river, flowing from near the Mongolian border to eventually join the Kara Sea	JPL · 15804
15805 Murakamitakehiko	1994 GB_{1}	Takehiko Murakami (born 1956) is a well-known amateur astronomer in Kanagawa Prefecture.	JPL · 15805
15806 Kohei	1994 GN_{1}	Kohei Mori (born 1956), an amateur astronomer and junior high school teacher.	JPL · 15806
15808 Zelter	1994 GF_{10}	Composer Carl Friedrich Zelter (1758–1834) set Goethe's poems to music and wrote songs for male choirs. As director of the Berliner "Singakademie" beginning in 1800, he performed in particular the music of Bach. He founded in Berlin the first "Liedertafel", the prototype for choral societies in cities and towns around the world.	JPL · 15808
15810 Arawn	1994 JR_{1}	The Middle Welsh Pedair Cainc Y Mabinogi (Four Branches of the Mabinogi) describes Arawn as the ruler of the Celtic otherworld, Annwn.	JPL · 15810
15811 Nüsslein-Volhard	1994 ND_{1}	Christiane Nüsslein-Volhard (born 1942), a German biologist who intensely studied the development stages of the fly Drosophila melanogaster and shared the 1995 Nobel prize for medicine for her epoch-making discoveries of the fundamental genetic steering mechanisms of embryogeny.	JPL · 15811
15817 Lucianotesi	1994 QC	Luciano Tesi, Italian amateur astronomer	MPC · 15817
15818 DeVeny	1994 RO_{7}	James B. ("Jim") DeVeny (1943–2004), born in Alliance, Ohio, joined the staff of Kitt Peak National Observatory in 1967 and became leader of the Instrument Support Group, playing a major role in the success and development of the observatory for more than 30 years.	JPL · 15818
15819 Alisterling	1994 SN_{9}	Alister Ling (born 1962) is a meteorologist with Environment Canada.	JPL · 15819
15821 Iijimatatsushi	1994 TM_{2}	Tatsushi Iijima (1963–2015) was a journalist who worked at Kyodo News for about 28 years. He was a professional photographer who loved motorbikes. He supported the Japanese space missions Hayabusa and Hayabusa2.	JPL · 15821
15822 Genefahnestock	1994 TV_{15}	Eugene G. Fahnestock (born 1980) has made seminal contributions to the dynamical study of binary asteroids. He was the first to investigate the fully coupled dynamics of a detailed binary asteroid system model using the radar-based shape models of 1999 KW4.	JPL · 15822
15825 Capecchi	1994 WX_{1}	Mario Capecchi (born 1937), an Italian-born molecular geneticist, who was awareded with the 2007 Nobel Prize in Medicine for the discovery of "principles for introducing specific gene modifications in mice by the use of embryonic stem cells".	IAU · 15825
15828 Sincheskul	1995 BS	Boris Fillipovich Sincheskul (born 1936), Ukrainian astronomer, has worked at the Poltava Gravimetric Observatory since 1962. He has observed lunar occultations for over 46 years and he was a pioneer in occultation astronomy in Ukraine.	JPL · 15828
15834 McBride	1995 CT_{1}	Neil McBride (born 1966) British astronomer who has worked on many aspects of solar system dynamics, including meteor stream formation, interrelations between minor planets, comets and meteors, as well as the structure of the trans-Neptunian region.	JPL · 15834
15837 Mariovalori	1995 DG_{13}	Mario Valori (1930–2000) was an amateur astronomer in the Montelupo Group.	JPL · 15837
15838 Auclair	1995 FU_{12}	Raymond Auclair, Canadian amateur astronomer †	MPC · 15838
15840 Hiroshiendou	1995 KH_{1}	Hiroshi Endou (born 1939) is a confectionery manufacturer and amateur astronomer, active in the Nanyo Astronomy Lovers Club since 1983	JPL · 15840
15841 Yamaguchi	1995 OX	Yamaguchi prefecture, where the discoverer was born.	JPL · 15841
15843 Comcom	1995 SO_{3}	Com Com is the science museum in Fukushima, Japan.	JPL · 15843
15845 Bambi	1995 UC_{17}	Bambi, fictional young deer in Walt Disney's 1942 animated eponymous film	JPL · 15845
15846 Billfyfe	1995 UK_{28}	William Fyfe (1927–2013), was a New Zealand-born Canadian geochemist at the University of Western Ontario, known for his research on the environmental implications of human energy consumption (Src).	MPC · 15846
15849 Billharper	1995 YM_{10}	William Leonard Harper (born 1943) specializes in the philosophy of science. He earned a Ph.D. at the University of Rochester and has been in the department of philosophy at the University of Western Ontario since 1970. The name was suggested by R. Jedicke and P. Jedicke.	JPL · 15849
15851 Chrisfleming	1996 AD_{10}	Christopher Edward John Fleming (born 1956) is a dedicated amateur astronomer, active in the Royal Astronomical Society of Canada, London Centre. As chair of the society's national observing committee, he has encouraged many new observers. The name was suggested by R. Jedicke and P. Jedicke.	JPL · 15851
15853 Benedettafoglia	1996 BB_{13}	Benedetta Foglia (born 2006) is the second daughter of Sergio and Paola Diomede, friends of the discoverers. Benedetta is an amateur astronomer.	JPL · 15853
15854 Numa	1996 CX_{2}	Numa Pompilius, second king of Rome, reigned from 715 to 672 B.C.	JPL · 15854
15855 Mariasalvatore	1996 CP_{7}	Maria Salvatore (born 1963) is an enthusiast of small Solar System bodies, who has played a major role in promoting astronomy to the public. She has organized astronomical and scientific events, especially conferences and seminars for the study of asteroids. Name suggested by Claudio Casacci.	JPL · 15855
15856 Yanokoji	1996 EL	Koji Yano (born 1964) is a Japanese amateur astronomer in Ehime Prefecture. A skilled photographer of nebula and star clusters, he is highly regarded for the superior technique. He is a member of the Oriental Astronomical Association.	JPL · 15856
15857 Touji	1996 EK_{1}	Yasuo Touji (born 1949) is a Japanese amateur astronomer in Ishigakijima, Okinawa Prefecture, Japan. He is now the Chief director of a local astronomy club, "Yaeyama Hoshinokai", and contributes to the popularization of astronomy.	JPL · 15857
15858 Davidwoods	1996 EK_{15}	David Woods (born 1959), a Scottish space historian.	JPL · 15858
15860 Siráň	1996 HO	Gustáv Siráň (1934–2000), a Slovak geophysicist and former professor at Comenius University, Bratislava. From 1981 to 1989 he was head of the department of astronomy, geophysics and meteorology, and during this time the Astronomical and Geophysical Observatory in Modra was built.	MPC · 15860
15861 Ispahan	1996 HB_{12}	Ispahan, Iran	JPL · 15861
15868 Akiyoshidai	1996 OL	Akiyoshidai, located at the center of Yamaguchi prefecture, is the biggest karst plateau in Japan.	JPL · 15868
15869 Tullius	1996 PL	Tullus Hostilius (reigned 673–642 BC), third king of Rome. He was a warrior king, and during the war against the city of Alba Longa there was a famous fight between Oratii and Curiatii.	JPL · 15869
15870 Obůrka	1996 QD	Oto Obůrka (1909–1982), Czech astronomer and professor at Brno University of Technology, who founded the Nicholas Copernicus Observatory there and led it for 20 years. He established a program, aimed at young amateurs, for monitoring short-period variable stars. He was an honorary president of the International Union of Amateur Astronomers.	JPL · 15870
15882 Dingzhong	1997 CF_{29}	Founded in 1902, Dingzhou High School, known by the abbreviation Dingzhong, is a high school in Hebei Province.	IAU · 15882
15884 Maspalomas	1997 DJ	Maspalomas is a town in Gran Canaria Island, Spain. The Maspalomas Tracking Station of the Japan Aerospace Exploration Agency is located there to conduct command operations and receive telemetry from satellites that observe the earth and the moon	JPL · 15884
15887 Daveclark	1997 ER_{26}	David Leslie Clark (born 1956) is an amateur astronomer active in the Royal Astronomical Society of Canada, London Centre, particularly in educational activities. He created ClearSky, a planetarium software package. The name was suggested by R. Jedicke and P. Jedicke.	JPL · 15887
15889 Xiaoyuhe	1997 FD_{4}	Xiaoyu He (born 1994), 2012 Intel STS finalist.	JPL · 15889
15890 Prachatice	1997 GY	Prachatice is a southern Bohemian town that began as a small settlement on the Golden Trail that had the rights to sell salt from Passau. The Prachatice of today, founded in the 14th century, is dominated by the Gothic Church of St. James.	JPL · 15890
15891 Alissazhang	1997 GG_{7}	Alissa Yuan Zhang (born 1994), 2012 Intel STS finalist.	JPL · 15891
15896 Birkhoff	1997 LX_{5}	George David Birkhoff (1884–1944) was one of the foremost American mathematicians of the early twentieth century. He made important contributions to ergodic theory, the topological theory of dynamical systems, ordinary differential equations and difference equations.	JPL · 15896
15897 Beňačková	1997 PD_{3}	Gabriela Beňačková, Slovak soprano	MPC · 15897
15898 Kharasterteam	1997 QP	The asteroid group at the Astronomical Observatory of Kharkiv National University has made important contributions to studies of the physical properties of minor planets. The group's photometric and polarimetric techniques, as well as its numerical and laboratory modeling, are known worldwide.	JPL · 15898
15899 Silvain	1997 RR_{1}	Jacques Silvain (1926–1987) was an enthusiastic amateur astronomer.	JPL · 15899

== 15901–16000 ==
back to top

Named minor planet	Provisional	This minor planet was named for...	Ref; Catalog
15902 Dostál	1997 RA_{9}	Víťa Dostál (born 1959), a Czech globetrotter who became a legend as the first person in his country to cycle alone 60~000 km around the world. He described the 1994–1997 adventure in Lucky Planet. A professional farmer, during 2006–2007 he made the Panamericana solo bike tour from Anchorage to Ushuaia in 223 days.	JPL · 15902
15903 Rolandflorrie	1997 RP_{10}	Roland (1914–1999) and Florrie (1912–2000) Handley were the parents of the discoverer.	JPL · 15903
15904 Halstead	1997 SD_{11}	Susan Ruth Halstead (born 1959) is the sister of the discoverer.	JPL · 15904
15905 Berthier	1997 SV_{15}	Jérôme Berthier (born 1968) works on minor planets at the Institut de Mécanique Céleste in Paris. His main goal is to develop both accurate ephemerides and the reduction package PRIAM to predict stellar occultations by minor planets.	JPL · 15905
15906 Yoshikaneda	1997 SX_{21}	Yosibumi Kaneda (born 1937), a retired teacher of high school, is an amateur astronomer, active in the Nanyo Astronomy Lovers Club since 1983	JPL · 15906
15907 Robot	1997 TG_{10}	Robot, word coined by Josef Čapek	MPC · 15907
15908 Bertoni	1997 TE_{12}	Mosé Giacomo Bertoni (1857–1929), a Swiss-Paraguayan botanist, anthropologist and writer.	JPL · 15908
15910 Shinkamigoto	1997 TU_{17}	Shinkamigoto is a town located in the north of the Goto Islands, a group of 140 islands located in the west of Nagasaki prefecture in southwest Japan	JPL · 15910
15911 Davidgauthier	1997 TL_{21}	David Gauthier, philosopher.	JPL · 15911
15913 Telemachus	1997 TZ_{27}	Telemachus, Greek mythological figure.	JPL · 15913
15916 Shigeoyamada	1997 UL_{7}	Shigeo Yamada (1942–2002), an aerospace engineer at the National Space Development Agency of Japan, managed the lunar explorer KAGUYA and the engineering test satellites ETS-VII. Generous and thoughtful, he devoted himself to working on NASDA projects until the "fuel" of his life was finally exhausted	JPL · 15916
15917 Rosahavel	1997 UX_{7}	Josef Havel (1930–2008) was a significant personality in Czech rose breeding. A diligent and modest man, he detected and preserved several color mutations and obtained numerous awards in international rose contests, including the gold medal in Rome for Nette Ingeborg	JPL · 15917
15918 Thereluzia	1997 UE_{9}	Theresia Luzia Ehring (born 1949) is the wife of the discoverer.	JPL · 15918
15921 Kintaikyo	1997 VP	Kintaikyo is one of the three most famous bridges in Japan, known collectively as Sanmeikyo.	JPL · 15921
15922 Masajisaito	1997 VR	Masaji Saito, Japanese architectural restorer, free-lance photographer and amateur astronomer	JPL · 15922
15924 Axelmartin	1997 VE_{5}	Axel Martin (born 1968) is a longtime German amateur astronomer and co-founder of the Turtle Star Observatory. As a member of the VdS Fachgruppe "Kleine Planeten" he works on the astrometry and photometry of minor planets	JPL · 15924
15925 Rokycany	1997 VM_{6}	Rokycany is a town in West Bohemia about which the first written evidence dates from 1110. In 1947 a public observatory was founded there, concentrating on occultation observations, work with youth, teachers and amateur telescope making	JPL · 15925
15929 Ericlinton	1997 WQ_{11}	Eric John Clinton (born 1955), an amateur astronomer active in the Royal Astronomical Society of Canada, London Centre.	JPL · 15929
15938 Bohnenblust	1997 YA_{8}	de:Frederic Bohnenblust (Henri Frederic Bohnenblust) (1906–2000), Swiss-born American mathematician.	JPL · 15938
15939 Fessenden	1997 YP_{8}	Reginald Aubrey Fessenden (1866–1932) invented amplitude modulation as a means of transmitting sounds by radio. He was a professor at Purdue University and the University of Pittsburgh.	JPL · 15939
15941 Stevegauthier	1997 YX_{15}	Steven Maurice Gauthier (born 1957), a Canadian amateur astronomer.	JPL · 15941
15945 Raymondavid	1998 AZ_{5}	Raymond David (born 1941), ski teacher by vocation and electronics specialist and amateur astronomer by avocation.	JPL · 15945
15946 Satinský	1998 AP_{7}	Július Satinský, Slovak comedian †	MPC · 15946
15947 Milligan	1998 AL_{10}	Spike Milligan (born 1918) is best known for his off-the-planet sense of humor in the groundbreaking BBC radio comedy series The Goon Show.	JPL · 15947
15949 Rhaeticus	1998 BQ	Georg Joachim Rheticus (1514–1574) was an Austrian humanist, physician, mathematician and astronomer at the universities of Vienna, Leipzig and Wittenberg. He summarized and popularized the work of his teacher Copernicus, initiating the first printing of De Revolutionibus.	JPL · 15949
15950 Dallago	1998 BA_{2}	Giovanni Dal Lago (born 1964), Vicenza amateur astronomer.	JPL · 15950
15954 Divjotbedi	1998 BG_{11}	Divjot Singh Bedi (b. 2002) was awarded second place in the 2019 Intel International Science and Engineering Fair for his embedded systems team project. He attended the Thomas Jefferson High School for Science and Technology, Alexandria, Virginia, U.S.A.	IAU · 15954
15955 Johannesgmunden	1998 BS_{13}	Johannes von Gmunden, Austrian priest, humanist, mathematician and astronomer †	MPC · 15955
15957 Gemoore	1998 BB_{27}	George Edward Moore, English philosopher.	JPL · 15957
15960 Hluboká	1998 CH	Hluboká nad Vltavou, château in South Bohemia †	MPC · 15960
15963 Koeberl	1998 CY_{3}	Christian Koeberl, Austrian professor of geochemistry and cosmochemistry	JPL · 15963
15964 Billgray	1998 DU	Bill Gray (born 1965) has made several contributions to astrometry, in particular with his Guide series of starcharting software, his Charon astrometry program and his reduction of the GSC 1.1 star catalog to the ACT frame (GSC-ACT).	JPL · 15964
15965 Robertcox	1998 DU_{7}	Robert E. Cox, American long time editor of Gleanings for ATMs (Amateur Telescope Makers) in Sky & Telescope magazine.	JPL · 15965
15967 Clairearmstrong	1998 DN_{20}	Claire Armstrong, collaborator and wife of the discoverer, supernova hunter M. Armstrong	JPL · 15967
15968 Waltercugno	1998 DX_{35}	Walter Cugno (born 1950) works in the Italian space industry. During his career, he developed projects for the International Space Station and space exploration. He supported satellite projects including Sax, Hipparcos and ExoMars. Name suggested by Ilaria Locantore.	JPL · 15968
15969 Charlesgreen	1998 EW_{11}	Charles Green (1735–1771), British astronomer who was the official astronomer on Cook's expedition aboard the Endeavour to Tahiti to observe the 1769 transit of Venus. After the successful observation of the event, the expedition left Tahiti and sailed for Australia and Jakarta. In Batavia Green caught malaria and was buried at sea.	JPL · 15969
15970 Robertbrownlee	1998 FA_{9}	Robert Brownlee (born 1924), an American astronomer.	JPL · 15970
15971 Hestroffer	1998 FA_{11}	Daniel Hestroffer (born 1965), a French astronomer who works at the Institut de Mécanique Céleste in Paris on the determination of an inertial frame from the Hipparcos observations of minor planets. He has also worked on the determination of the shapes of minor planets.	JPL · 15971
15976 Bhansali	1998 FY_{119}	Rinni Bhansali (b. 2001) was awarded second place in the 2019 Intel International Science and Engineering Fair for her mathematics project. She attended the Half Hollow Hills High School East, Dix Hills, New York, U.S.A	IAU · 15976
15977 Pyraechmes	1998 MA_{11}	Pyraechmes, leader of the Paeonian horsemen from Amydon, who was killed by Patroclus.	IAU · 15977
15985 Bhatnagar	1998 WU_{20}	Amogh Bhatnagar (b. 2001) was awarded second place in the 2019 Intel International Science and Engineering Fair for his biochemistry project. He attended the University School of Milwaukee, Milwaukee, Wisconsin, U.S.A.	IAU · 15985
15986 Fienga	1998 XU_{1}	Agnes Fienga (born 1973), French astronomer who works at the Institut de Mécanique Céleste in Paris on the global adjustment of analytical theories of planetary motion to observations. She also worked on space navigation at CNES and JPL.	JPL · 15986
15988 Parini	1998 XD_{24}	Eduardo Parini (born 1926), a Paraguayan amateur astronomer.	JPL · 15988
15989 Anusha	1998 XK_{39}	Anusha Bhattacharyya (b. 2001) was awarded second place in the 2019 Intel International Science and Engineering Fair for her materials science project. She attended the Little Rock Central High School, Little Rock, Arkansas, U.S.A.	IAU · 15989
15992 Cynthia	1998 YL_{4}	Cynthia Hug, the discoverer's wife; Cynthia is also an alternate name for the Moon goddess Artemis (from her birthplace, Mount Cynthus on Delos), and this minor planet was imaged many times with the Moon above the horizon	JPL · 15992
16000 Neilgehrels	1999 AW_{16}	Neil Gehrels (1952–2017), was an American astrophysicist who has worked to develop gamma-ray astronomy into a full astronomical discipline. He is the Principal Investigator for the Swift Gamma-Ray Burst Mission (launched Nov. 2004) and was Project Scientist for the Compton Gamma Ray Observatory (1991–2000). His father was astronomer Tom Gehrels.	JPL · 16000

back to top

Preceded by 14,001–15,000	Meanings of minor-planet names List of minor planets: 15,001–16,000	Succeeded by 16,001–17,000
