= Guerriero =

Guerriero (Italian, 'warrior') is a surname. Notable people with the surname include:

- Aristide Guerriero (1986), Italian shot putter
- Jason Guerriero (1981), American ice hockey coach
- Leila Guerriero (1967), Argentine journalist and writer
- Luciano Guerriero, Italian physicist
- Ludovic Guerriero (1985), French footballer
- Patrick Guerriero (1968), American politician from Massachusetts
- Roger Guerriero (1982), Polish footballer
