= NGC 6627 =

Galaxy in the constellation Hercules

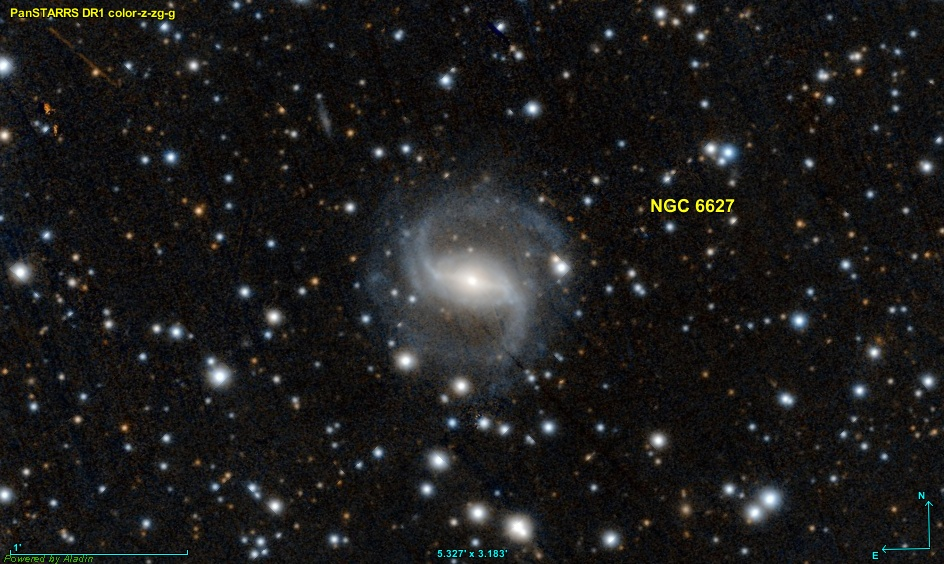
- NGC 6627 imaged by Pan-STARRS

Observation data (J2000 epoch)
- Constellation: Hercules
- Right ascension: 18^{h} 22^{m} 38.9181^{s}
- Declination: +15° 41′ 52.810″
- Redshift: 0.017565±0.000005
- Heliocentric radial velocity: 5,266±1 km/s
- Distance: 197.10 ± 15.05 Mly (60.432 ± 4.615 Mpc)
- Apparent magnitude (V): 14.3

Characteristics
- Type: (R')SB(s)b
- Size: ~93,000 ly (28.51 kpc) (estimated)
- Apparent size (V): 1.3′ × 1.1′

Other designations
- IRAS 18203+1540, UGC 11212, MCG +03-47-001, PGC 61792, CGCG 114-004

NGC 6627 is a barred spiral galaxy in the constellation of Hercules. Its velocity with respect to the cosmic microwave background is 5,146±9 km/s, which corresponds to a Hubble distance of 247.6 ± 17.3 Mly (75.90 ± 5.31 Mpc). However, 25 non-redshift measurements give a much closer mean distance of 197.10 ± 15.05 Mly (60.432 ± 4.615 Mpc). It was discovered by German astronomer Albert Marth on 13 July 1863.

NGC 6627 is an active galaxy nucleus candidate, i.e. it has a compact region at the center of a galaxy that emits a significant amount of energy across the electromagnetic spectrum, with characteristics indicating that this luminosity is not produced by the stars.

== Supernovae ==
Three supernovae have been observed in NGC 6627:

- SN 1998V (Type Ia, mag. 16) was discovered by British amateur astronomer Mark Armstrong on 10 March 1998.
- SN 2018evy (Type II, mag. 17.503) was discovered by ATLAS on 11 August 2018.
- SN 2021abkm (Type II, mag. 18.151) was discovered by ATLAS on 14 October 2021.

== See also ==
- List of NGC objects (6001–7000)
