= Penttilä =

Surname list

Penttilä is the surname of the following people

- Eero Akaan-Penttilä (born 1943), Finnish politician
- Eino Penttilä (1906–1982), Finnish javelin thrower
- Erkki Penttilä (1932–2005), Finnish wrestler
- Johan Penttilä (1891–1967), Finnish wrestler
- Risto E. J. Penttilä (born 1959), Finnish politician
- Sinikka Luja-Penttilä (1924–2023), Finnish politician and writer
- Timo Penttilä (1931–2011), Finnish architect

== See also ==
- 15224 Penttilä, asteroid
