= NGC 3995 =

Galaxy in the constellation Ursa Major

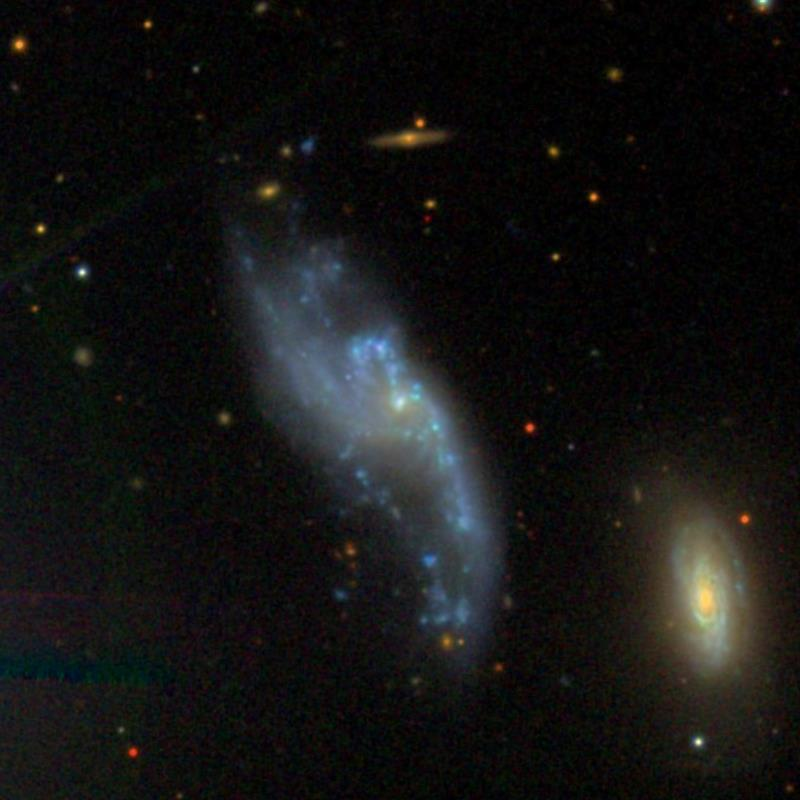
- NGC 3995 by Sloan Digital Sky Survey

Observation data (J2000 epoch)
- Constellation: Ursa Major
- Right ascension: 11^{h} 57^{m} 44.1^{s}
- Declination: +32° 17′ 39″
- Redshift: 0.010938 ± 0.000002
- Heliocentric radial velocity: 3,279 ± 1 km/s
- Distance: 102 Mly (31.2 Mpc)
- Apparent magnitude (V): 12.1

Characteristics
- Type: SAm pec
- Apparent size (V): 1.89′ × 0.78′
- Notable features: Interacting galaxy

Other designations
- HOLM 309A, Arp 313, UGC 6944, MCG +06-26-061, PGC 37624, CGCG 186-075, VV 249a

NGC 3995 is a Magellanic spiral galaxy in the constellation Ursa Major. The galaxy lies about 100 million light years away from Earth based on the Tully–Fisher relation, which means, given its apparent dimensions, that NGC 3995 is approximately 80,000 light years across, while based on redshift it lies 170 million light years away. It was discovered by Heinrich d'Arrest on February 5, 1864.

NGC 3995 forms a triplet of galaxies with NGC 3994, which lies 1.9 arcminutes, and NGC 3991, which lies 3.7 arcminutes away. The triplet has been included in Halton Arp's Atlas of Peculiar Galaxies as Arp 313. Both NGC 3995 and NGC 3991 have disturbed appearances while NGC 3994 does not. The triplet is part of the NGC 3966 Group or LGG 259. Other members include NGC 3966, NGC 3935, NGC 3986, IC 2973, UGC 6892, IC 2978, and IC 2979.

The star formation rate of NGC 3995 is estimated to be 4.2±0.9 M_{☉} per year, with higher rates observed near the centre of the galaxy. The nucleus of the galaxy has emission that resembles an HII region. The spectrum of the galaxy has Wolf-Rayet features, indicative of recent star formation. Hubble Space Telescope detected 46 star formation knots in the galaxy, most of them having ages less than 20 million years.

== Supernovae ==
Two supernovae have been observed in NGC 3995:

- SN 1988ac (type unknown, mag. 16.5) was discovered by Michael Richmond on 30 December 1988.
- SN 2000ez (Type II, mag. 16.8) was discovered by British amateur astronomer Mark Armstrong on 24 November 2000.

== See also ==
- List of NGC objects (3001–4000)
