= NGC 5980 =

Galaxy in the constellation Serpens

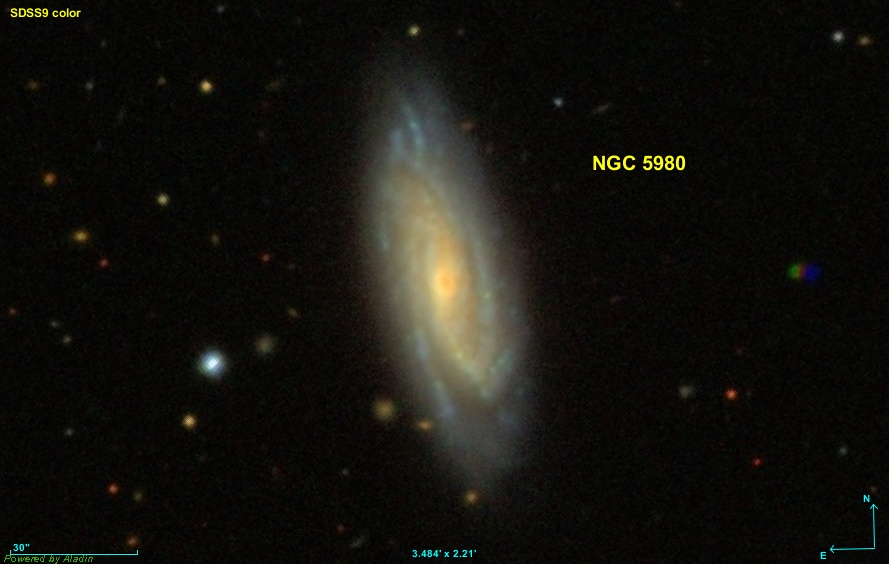
- NGC 5980 imaged by SDSS

Observation data (J2000 epoch)
- Constellation: Serpens
- Right ascension: 15^{h} 41^{m} 30.4158^{s}
- Declination: +15° 47′ 15.738″
- Redshift: 0.013649±0.0000170
- Heliocentric radial velocity: 4,092±5 km/s
- Distance: 155.90 ± 2.21 Mly (47.800 ± 0.677 Mpc)
- Apparent magnitude (B): 12.3

Characteristics
- Type: S
- Size: ~86,400 ly (26.49 kpc) (estimated)
- Apparent size (V): 1.9′ × 0.7′

Other designations
- HOLM 720A, IRAS 15391+1556, UGC 9974, MCG +03-40-026, PGC 55800, CGCG 107-025

NGC 5980 is a spiral galaxy in the constellation of Serpens. Its velocity with respect to the cosmic microwave background is 4,216±10 km/s, which corresponds to a Hubble distance of 202.8 ± 14.2 Mly (62.18 ± 4.36 Mpc). However, five non-redshift measurements give a closer mean distance of 155.90 ± 2.21 Mly (47.800 ± 0.677 Mpc). It was discovered by German-British astronomer William Herschel on 19 March 1787.

== Supernovae ==
Two supernovae have been observed in NGC 5980:

- SN 2004ci (Type II, mag. 17.5) was discovered by the Lick Observatory Supernova Search (LOSS) on 15 June 2004, and independently by Mark Armstrong on 16 June 2004.
- SN 2019pqo (Type IIb, mag. 18.6697) was discovered by the Automatic Learning for the Rapid Classification of Events (ALeRCE) on 7 September 2019.

== See also ==
- List of NGC objects (5001–6000)
