= NGC 3323 =

Galaxy in the constellation Leo Minor

- NGC 3323 imaged by SDSS

Observation data (J2000 epoch)
- Constellation: Leo Minor
- Right ascension: 10^{h} 39^{m} 39.0224^{s}
- Declination: +25° 19′ 21.838″
- Redshift: 0.017334±0.00000884
- Heliocentric radial velocity: 5,197±3 km/s
- Distance: 264.9 ± 18.6 Mly (81.22 ± 5.69 Mpc)
- Group or cluster: Coma Cluster
- Apparent magnitude (V): 14.0g

Characteristics
- Type: SB?
- Size: ~110,600 ly (33.90 kpc) (estimated)
- Apparent size (V): 1.29′ × 0.59′

Other designations
- IRAS 10368+2535, 2MASX J10393902+2519214, UGC 5800, MCG +04-25-036, PGC 31712, CGCG 124-049

NGC 3323 is a barred spiral galaxy in the constellation of Leo Minor. Its velocity with respect to the cosmic microwave background is 5,507±22 km/s, which corresponds to a Hubble distance of 264.9 ± 18.6 Mly (81.22 ± 5.69 Mpc). It was discovered by French astronomer Édouard Stephan on 15 March 1877.

NGC 3323 is a radio galaxy, i.e. it has giant regions of radio emission extending well beyond its visible structure. The galaxy also has a possible active galactic nucleus, i.e. it has a compact region at the center of a galaxy that emits a significant amount of energy across the electromagnetic spectrum, with characteristics indicating that this luminosity is not produced by the stars.

NGC 3323 is a member of the Coma Cluster.

== Supernovae ==
Three supernovae have been observed in NGC 3323:

- SN 2004bs (Type Ib, mag. 17.0) was discovered by Mark Armstrong on 16 May 2004.
- SN 2005kk (Type II, mag. 17.7) was discovered by the Lick Observatory Supernova Search (LOSS) on 17 November 2005.
- SN 2026akbo (Type Ia, mag. 18.76) was discovered by GOTO on 17 November 2026.

== See also ==
- List of NGC objects (3001–4000)
