= NGC 3994 =

Galaxy in the constellation Ursa Major

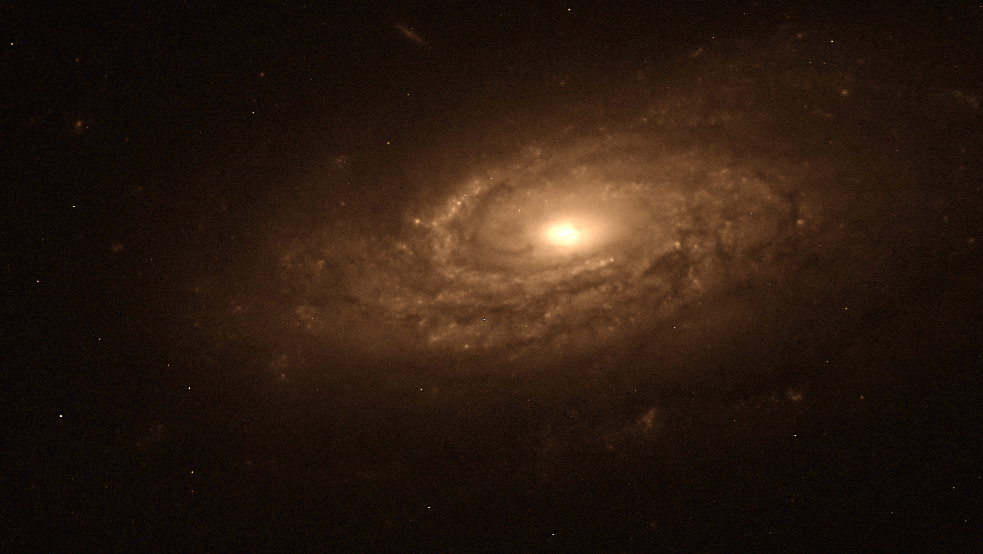
- NGC 3994 by Hubble Space Telescope

Observation data (J2000 epoch)
- Constellation: Ursa Major
- Right ascension: 11^{h} 57^{m} 36.9^{s}
- Declination: +32° 16′ 40″
- Redshift: 0.010279 ± 0.000009
- Heliocentric radial velocity: 3,082 ± 3 km/s
- Distance: 161 ± 11.4 Mly (49.4 ± 3.5 Mpc)
- Apparent magnitude (V): 12.7

Characteristics
- Type: SA(r)c pec
- Apparent size (V): 1.30′ × 0.64′
- Notable features: Interacting galaxy

Other designations
- UGC 6936, Arp 313, VV 249b, MCG +06-26-059, PGC 37616, HOLM 309B

NGC 3994 is an unbarred spiral galaxy in the constellation Ursa Major. The galaxy lies about 160 million light years away from Earth, which means, given its apparent dimensions, that NGC 3994 is approximately 70,000 light years across. It was discovered by Heinrich d'Arrest on April 6, 1864.

NGC 3994 forms a triplet of galaxies with NGC 3995, which lies 1.9 arcminutes, and NGC 3991, which lies 3.7 arcminutes away. The triplet has been included in Halton Arp's Atlas of Peculiar Galaxies as Arp 313. Both NGC 3995 and NGC 3991 have a disturbed appearance while NGC 3994 does not. The triplet is part of the NGC 3966 Group or LGG 259. Other members include NGC 3966, NGC 3935, NGC 3986, IC 2973, UGC 6892, IC 2978, and IC 2979.

The nucleus of the galaxy has been found to be active, and based on its spectral lines it is a composite object with LINER and HII region characteristics. The nucleus lacks central ultraviolet emission when observed by the Hubble Space Telescope. Star formation knots are visible along the spiral arms, most of them with ages less than 20 million years, with no correlation between location and age. The star formation rate of NGC 3995 is estimated to be 2.9±0.6 M_{☉} per year, with higher rates observed near the centre of the galaxy.
