= 15224 Penttilä =

Main-belt asteroid

Discovery
- Discovered by: E. Bowell
- Discovery site: Anderson Mesa Stn.
- Discovery date: 15 May 1985

Designations
- Named after: Antti Penttilä (Finnish astronomer)
- Alternative designations: 1985 JG · 1970 HB; 2000 HR_{19}
- Minor planet category: main-belt · (inner) background

Orbital characteristics
- Epoch 27 April 2019 (JD 2458600.5)
- Uncertainty parameter 0
- Observation arc: 48.02 yr (17,539 d)
- Aphelion: 3.0019 AU
- Perihelion: 1.8313 AU
- Semi-major axis: 2.4166 AU
- Eccentricity: 0.2422
- Orbital period (sidereal): 3.76 yr (1,372 d)
- Mean anomaly: 356.13°
- Mean motion: 0° 15^{m} 44.64^{s} / day
- Inclination: 12.350°
- Longitude of ascending node: 70.116°
- Argument of perihelion: 196.23°

Physical characteristics
- Mean diameter: 7.924±0.119 km 8.79±3.79 km 9.60±2.05 km
- Synodic rotation period: 4.377±0.001 h
- Geometric albedo: 0.04–0.085
- Absolute magnitude (H): 13.80; 13.9; 14.13

15224 Penttilä (provisional designation 1985 JG) is a dark background asteroid from the inner regions of the asteroid belt, approximately 8 kilometers (5 miles) in diameter. It was discovered on 15 May 1985, by American astronomer Edward Bowell at Lowell's Anderson Mesa Station in Arizona, United States. The likely elongated asteroid has a rotation period of 4.4 hours. It was named after planetary scientist Antti Penttilä at the University of Helsinki.

== Orbit and classification ==
Penttilä is a non-family asteroid from the main belt's background population. It orbits the Sun in the inner asteroid belt at a distance of 1.8–3.0 AU once every 3 years and 9 months (1,372 days; semi-major axis of 2.42 AU). Its orbit has an eccentricity of 0.24 and an inclination of 12° with respect to the ecliptic.

The body's observation arc begins with its first observation, a precovery taken at the Crimean Astrophysical Observatory in April 1970, or 15 years prior to its official discovery observation at Anderson Mesa Station.

== Naming ==
This minor planet was named for Finnish postdoctoral researcher Antti Penttilä (born 1977) at the University of Helsinki, an expert on light reflection and absorption on the surface of small Solar System bodies such as asteroids and cometary nuclei, as well as of the cosmic dust released by cometary comae. The official naming citation was published on 12 July 2014 (M.P.C. 89081).

== Physical characteristics ==
The asteroid's spectral type has not been determined. Due to its low geometric albedo, it likely a carbonaceous C-type asteroid (see below).

=== Rotation period ===
In June 2015, a rotational lightcurve was obtained for this asteroid from photometric observations by astronomer Daniel Klinglesmith at Etscorn Campus Observatory (719), New Mexico. Lightcurve analysis gave a rotation period of 4.377±0.001 hours with a brightness variation of 0.55 in magnitude (U=3-), indicative of a non-spherical, elongated shape. Previously, in August 2012, a concurring period of 4.3771±0.0064 hours with an amplitude of 0.46 was determined from observations in the R-band by astronomers at the Palomar Transient Factory, California (U=2).

=== Diameter and albedo ===
According to the survey carried out by the NEOWISE mission of NASA's Wide-field Infrared Survey Explorer, Penttilä measures between 7.9 and 9.6 kilometers in diameter and its surface has an albedo between 0.04 and 0.085. The Collaborative Asteroid Lightcurve Link assumes a standard albedo for stony asteroids of 0.20, and hence calculates a smaller diameter of 4.9 kilometers.
