= Luciano Guerriero =

Italian physicist

Luciano Guerriero is an Italian physicist. He earned his degree in physics at University of Padua in 1952 and is now based in Bari University. Between 1988 and 1992 He headed the Italian Space Agency and has set up programs of collaboration with NASA such as the Cassini–Huygens mission to Saturn.

There's an asteroid (15005 Guerriero) named after Luciano Guerriero.

Luciano Guerriero has been P.I for the European project LEWIS for a landslide early warning system based on space data from SAR satellites.
