= Mark Armstrong (astronomer) =

British astronomer

Asteroids discovered: 2
15967 Clairearmstrong	24 February 1998
44016 Jimmypage ^{[1]}	30 November 1997
^{1} with C. Armstrong

Mark Armstrong (born 1958) is a British amateur astronomer, a member of the British Astronomical Association. With his wife Claire Armstrong, he works from Rolvenden, Kent, England (obs. code 960). As of 2006, has 58 supernova discoveries (and 12 co-discoveries) to his credit in addition to two asteroids.
